= Nightmare (2000 film) =

- Theatrical poster
- Hangul: 가위
- RR: Gawi
- MR: Kawi
- Directed by: Ahn Byeong-ki
- Written by: Ahn Byeong-ki
- Produced by: Goh Hyeong-wook; Stanley Kim; Lee Min-ho
- Starring: Kim Gyu-ri; Choi Jung-yoon; Ha Ji-won; Yoo Ji-tae
- Cinematography: Lee Seok-hyeon
- Edited by: Park Soon-deok
- Music by: Lee Tae-beom
- Distributed by: Tube Entertainment
- Release date: 29 July 2000
- Running time: 97 minutes
- Country: South Korea
- Language: Korean

Nightmare (Korean: 가위; RR: Gawi; lit. 'Scissors', also known as Horror Game Movie; released in the Philippines as Gawi: The Nightmare) is a 2000 South Korean horror film. It stars Kim Gyu-ri, Ha Ji-won and Choi Jung-yoon, and was directed and written by Ahn Byeong-ki, who later directed Phone (2002), Bunshinsaba (2004) and APT (2006). The film was the 6th best-selling film of 2000 with 322,000 admissions in Seoul after 5 weeks of screening.

== Plot ==
After their college graduation, a clique of six friends went separate ways. Sun-ae moves to the United States. Hye-jin pursues her tertiary education in psychology. Hyun-jun, due to an injury to his knee, is unable to keep playing sports and is stuck working in a scrapyard. Se-hoon opens an art studio. Jung-wook works as a lawyer and is married, but has an affair with Mi-ryeong, who is now an actress.

After a few years, Sun-ae returns home and tells Hye-jin she was being pursued by the supposedly deceased Kyung-ah. Hye-jin visits Se-hoon, who is haunted by dreams of a woman whose face he can't remember. Hye-jin herself begins having visions of Kyung-ah.

Back when they were in college, Hye-jin befriended a girl named Eun-ju. Members of the clique began experiencing strange accidents. Sun-ae exposed Eun-ju's true identity as Kyung-ah, a girl from Sun-ae and Hye-jin's past. Kyung-ah was rumoured to be a "possessed" child who spread deaths and misfortune. One of the casualties was Hye-jin's father. Hye-jin told Eun-ju to stay away from her. That night, Hye-jin witnessed Eun-ju committing suicide.

Kyung-ah kills Se-hoon. Hye-jin calls the rest of the group and Jung-wook claims Sun-ae blamed herself for causing Kyung-ah's death, and reveals she went to the U.S. to seek mental treatment, not education. Desperate to escape his job, Hyun-jun blackmails Jung-wook into becoming his lawyer. He hands over a tape showing Jung-wook and Mi-ryeong having sex, recorded by Se-hoon, who had a habit of recording people. Se-hoon also recorded Kyung-ah's death. Hyun-jun is killed next. Hye-jin angrily asks Sun-ae her why Kyung-ah is going after them. Kyung-ah appears, visible only to Sun-ae, who runs away.

After almost being drowned by Kyung-ah, Mi-ryeong begs Jung-wook to stay with her, but he refuses. She breaks up with Jung-wook and is found dead in her bathroom. Hye-jin finds Se-hoon's video tape and learns what happened the night Kyung-ah died. After Hye-jin left, an altercation ensued, triggered by Kyung-ah's cat attacking Jung-wook and him trying to kill it. In the confusion, Hyun-jun fell and broke his leg, and Kyung-ah also fell and passed out from a head injury. To protect themselves, the five decided to fake Kyung-ah's suicide and push her body off a building. Kyung-ah woke up but Jung-wook killed her anyway.

Jung-wook breaks into Hye-jin's apartment to find the video tape, but Sun-ae attacks him. He chases her to the same building Kyung-ah died. Fixated on protecting his career, he attempts to kill Hye-jin and Sun-ae to cover up the truth. Sun-ae impales him with a metal rod, killing him.

Some time later, Sun-ae and Hye-jin meet. Kyung-ah appears, this time visible to Hye-jin as well, and kills Sun-ae so that the two of them can finally be together.

== Cast ==
- Kim Gyu-ri as Lee Hye-jin
- Choi Jung-yoon as Seon-ae
- Ha Ji-won as Lee Eun-ju/Kyung-ah
- Yoo Ji-tae as Kim Hyun-jun
- Yoo Jun-sang as Choi Jung-wook
- Jung Joon as Park Se-hun
- Jo Hye-yeong as Jung Mi-ryeong

== Production ==
=== Incidences ===
The actors had injuries and incidents while making this film, and also mentioned ghost sightings in the toilet.

== Release ==
Nightmare was released in South Korea on July 29, 2000. In the Philippines, the film was released as Gawi: The Nightmare on March 3, 2004.

=== Home media ===
Tartan Video's Region 1 release of the film has a vertically stretched image, (the 1.85:1 film is presented in 1.74:1) which causes noticeable distortion of angles, as well as making everything appear thinner than it should.

== Remake ==
A Chinese remake of the film, titled Bunshinsaba 2 (筆仙II, Bǐxiān II), also directed by Ahn Byeong-ki, was released on July 16, 2013, as part of a trilogy of the Mandarin-language films directed by Ahn. The title refers to the director's 2004 Korean film, Bunshinsaba, though none of the films in the trilogy bear any resemblance to it. It starred Xin Zhilei, Park Han-byul, Zhang Haoran, Sienna Li, Sun Shaolong, Yang Fan, and Zhang Tingting. It is almost a shot-for-shot remake, aside from the setting, language, and actor changes, a few details (Hyun-jun previously played baseball, whereas his Chinese counterpart, Hongrui, played tennis), and an additional scene that pays homage to the 2004 film Bunshinsaba.
