= Choi Jung-yoon =

South Korean actress (born 1977)

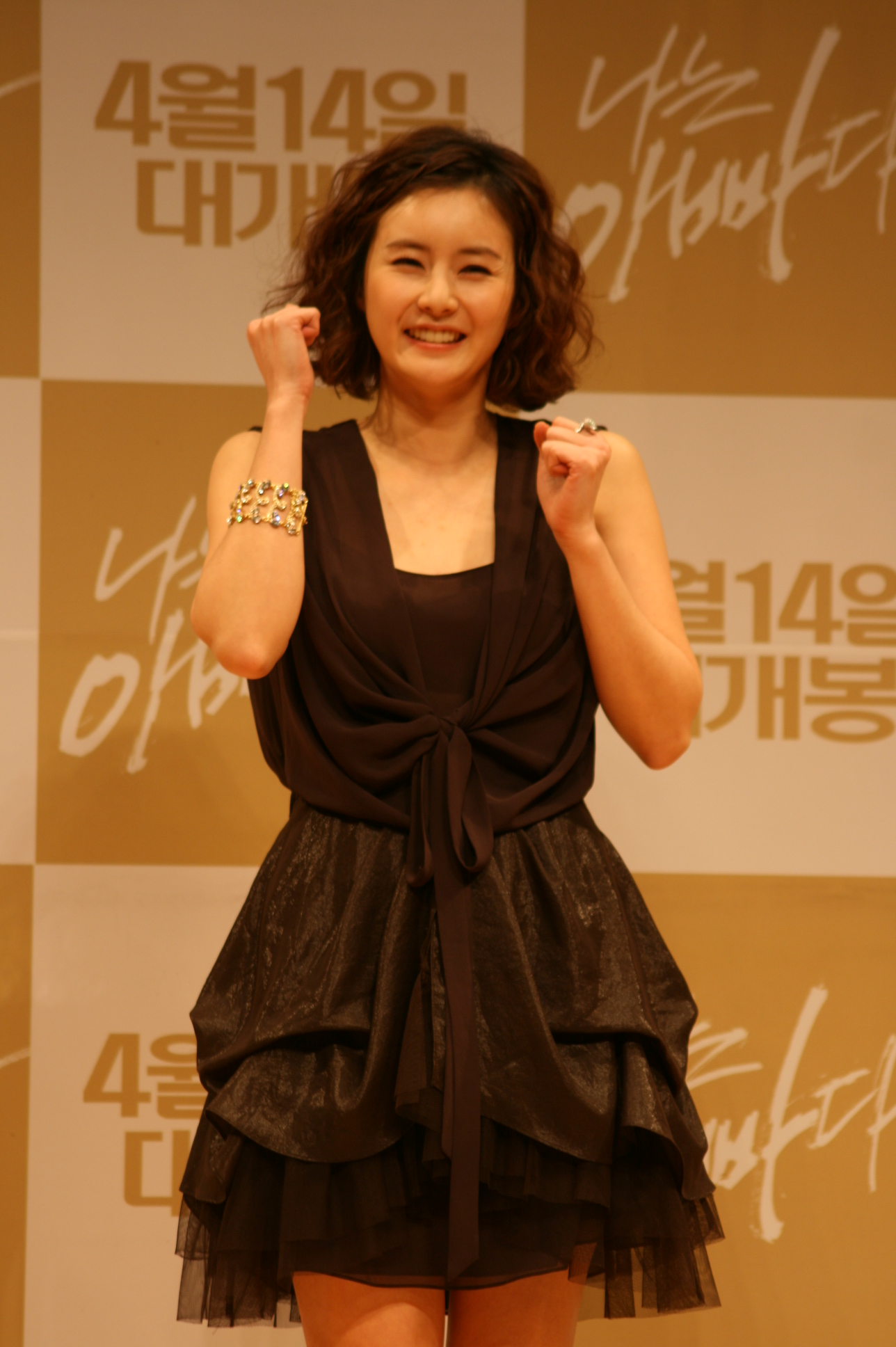
- Choi in March 2011
- Born: 9 May 1977 (age 49); Seoul, South Korea
- Education: Chung-Ang University – Bachelor's degree in Theater and Film; Chung-Ang University Graduate School – Master's degree in Visual Arts
- Occupation: Actress
- Years active: 1996–present
- Agent: Park Plus Entertainment
- Spouse: Yoon Tae-jun (m. 2011; div. 2021)
- Children: 1

Korean name
- Hangul: 최정윤
- Hanja: 崔貞允
- RR: Choe Jeongyun
- MR: Ch'oe Chŏngyun

Choi Jung-yoon (Korean: 최정윤; born 9 May 1977) is a South Korean actress. She is best known for starring in television dramas, with leading roles in Romance Hunter (2007), Manny (2011), Ojakgyo Family (2011), Angel's Choice (2012), and Cheer Up, Mr. Kim! (2012). Choi has also appeared in supporting roles on the big screen, notably in Ahn Byeong-ki's horror movies and Lee Joon-ik's dramedy Radio Star (2006).

== Personal life ==
Choi married Yoon Tae-jun on 3 December 2011. Yoon is the eldest son of Park Sung-gyung, vice chairwoman of retail conglomerate E-Land Group; currently a businessman, Yoon was also a member of the short-lived '90s boy band Eagle Five. They welcomed a daughter in November 2016. On 6 October 2021, Choi's agency confirmed that she had divorced her husband.

== Filmography ==
=== Television series ===
Year	Title	Role
1996	Three Guys and Three Girls	Choi Jung-yoon
1997	Beautiful My Lady	Daughter of boxing gym owner
1997	Miari No. 1	
1998	Love	Sung-nan
1998	Mister Q	Jung Na-rae
1998	Song of the Wind	
1999	Someone's House	Kim Nam-ok
2000	Mr. Duke	Joo Eun-ha
2000	Roll of Thunder	Sung-ok
2001	Stock Flower	Shin-hee
2001	Orient Theatre	Moon Jung-hyun
2002	Honest Living	Noh Jung-yoon
2003	Cats on the Roof	Na Hye-ryun
2004	Forgiveness	Jung Soo-min
2005	Taereung National Village (MBC Best Theater)	Bang Soo-ah
2006	Love Can't Wait	Seo Eun-joo
2007	Romance Hunter	Hong Young-joo
2007	Bad Couple	Han Young
2007	That Woman Is Scary	Baek Eun-ae
2008	Last Scandal	Kim Min-hee (cameo, episode 16)
2009	Smile, You	Seo Jung-kyung
2011	Manny	Seo Do-young
2011	Ojakgyo Family	Cha Soo-young
2012	Angel's Choice	Choi Eun-seol
2012	Cheer Up, Mr. Kim!	Chun Ji-young
2013	Drama Festival "Boy Meets Girl"	Jung Shin-na
2014	Can We Fall in Love, Again?	Kwon Ji-hyun
2014	Cheongdam-dong Scandal	Eun Hyun-soo
2021	Amor Fati	Do Yeon-hee
2024	Desperate Mrs. Seonju	Jin Sang-Ah

=== Film ===
Year	Title	Role
1997	Father	
2000	Nightmare	Seon-ae
2000	Pisces	Thin girl
2002	Phone	Min Ja-young
2003	The Circle	Son Mi-hyung/San-hong
2004	Bunshinsaba	Ho-kyung
2006	Radio Star	Kang Seok-young
2007	Voice of a Murderer	Anchorwoman Ha Joo-won
2011	I Am a Dad	Soo-kyung

=== Television show ===
Year	Title
2009–2010	Gold Miss Is Coming
2012	Hometown Variety Dreams and Fields
2015–2016	Shaolin Clenched Fists
2021	I Need Women
2022	Queen of Ssireum

== Theater ==
Year	Title	Role
2009	My First Time	

== Awards and nominations ==
Year	Award	Category	Nominated work	Result
2000	21st Blue Dragon Film Awards	Best Supporting Actress	Nightmare	Nominated
2006	27th Blue Dragon Film Awards	Best New Actress	Radio Star	Nominated
2007	43rd Baeksang Arts Awards	Best New Actress	Radio Star	Nominated
2011	KBS Drama Awards	Best Couple Award (with Ryu Soo-young)	Ojakgyo Family	Won
2011	KBS Drama Awards	Excellence Award, Actress in a Serial Drama	Ojakgyo Family	Nominated
2012	MBC Drama Awards	Excellence Award, Actress in a Serial Drama	Angel's Choice	Nominated
2012	KBS Drama Awards	Excellence Award, Actress in a Daily Drama	Cheer Up, Mr. Kim!	Nominated
2014	SBS Drama Awards	Excellence Award, Actress in a Serial Drama	Cheongdam-dong Scandal	Won
