= Amor Fati (TV series) =

South Korean television romantic drama series

- Promotional poster
- Hangul: 아모르 파티
- Lit.: Love of Fate
- RR: Amoreu pati
- MR: Amorŭ p'at'i
- Genre: Romance; Melodrama
- Created by: SBS Drama Headquarters
- Written by: Nam Sun-hye
- Directed by: Bae Tae-seop
- Starring: Choi Jung-yoon; Ahn Jae-mo; Bae Seul-ki; Yoon Mi-ra
- Country of origin: South Korea
- Original language: Korean
- No. of episodes: 120

Production
- Executive producer: Yang Seung-eun
- Producers: Lee Sang-soo; Yang Mi-young
- Running time: 35 minutes
- Production companies: YCONE Entertainment Co., Ltd.

Original release
- Network: SBS TV
- Release: August 9, 2021 – April 1, 2022

Amor Fati (Korean: 아모르 파티) is a South Korean drama directed by Bae Tae-seop for SBS. Starring Choi Jung-yoon, Ahn Jae-mo and Bae Seul-ki it is a healing drama about two women. For them, "family" is everything, while the others view it as "success". It premiered on SBS TV on April 12, 2021, and aired on weekday at 08:35 (KST) for 120 episodes.

Incidentally Amor Fati was the last morning soap opera aired on South Korean television. After three years of being unable to rate above 10%, SBS announced on September 14, 2021, that it would abolish the 30-year old time-slot and expand its daytime news and lifestyle programming in its place. KBS1, TVN, KBS2 and MBC had abolished the daytime drama time-slot in 2015, 2019, and Bad Love, respectively.

== Synopsis ==
Amor Fati is a healing drama that depicts the resetting of lives of its characters who rise up from despair. A woman to whom her family is everything, gets the shock of her life when she learns about the affair of her husband to a woman to whom success is everything. The story of the series tells their battle and how her spirits rise from despair with the help of another man going through a similar situation.

== Cast ==
=== Main ===
- Choi Jung-yoon as Do Yeon-hee, Jun-ho's wife and Seo-woo's 45-year-old mother who works as a housewife, as well as Lara Group's only daughter-in-law.
- Ahn Jae-mo as Han Jae-kyung, Yoo-na's 40-year-old husband. A former pro-golfer, Jae-kyung is a golf teacher in the present time.
- Bae Seul-ki as Kang Yoo-na, a 35-year-old stylist assistant-director of Lara Fashion. She is Jae-kyung's wife, Ha-neul's mother, Joon-ho's girlfriend.
- Park Hyung-joon as Jang Joon-ho, the 48-year-old old CEO of Lara Fashion. He is Do Yeon-hee's husband and Lara Group's only son.

=== Supporting ===
Lara Group

- Kim Jong-goo as Jang Cheol-yong, the 70-year-old chairman of Lara Group who is Joon-ho and Joon-hee's father.
- Yoon Mi-ra as Go Sang-hye, Yeon-hee's 68-year-old mother-in-law.
- Kim Yeo-jin as Jang Joon-hee, the 35-year-old manager of Lara Fashion Planning Team.
- Park Sun-Jun as Hwang Cheol-oh, Chairman Jang's driver in his late 30s.

Shopping mall

- Jung Ae-yun as Jo Min-jeong, Yeon-hee's best friend from high school who is 45 years old. She serves as president of a chicken restaurant.
- Kim Hong-pyo as Park Yoon-cheol, Jae-kyung's 45-year-old senior who runs a medical store in Min-jeong's building
- Jung Ji-hoon as Han Ha-neul, Jae-kyung and Yoo-na's ten-year-old son.
- Koo Bon-jun as Hwang Woo-joo, the 10-year-old surrogate son of Min-jeong's second husband.

Do Yeon-hee's family

- Lee Kyung-jin as Seo Soon-boon, Yeon-hee's 63-year-old mother who serves as president of a Korean restaurant.
- Jang Yoo-bin as Jang Seo-woo, Seo-woo is a 25-year-old YouTuber who is Yeon-hee and Joon-ho's daughter.

Others

- Kwon Jae-hwan as Seo Min-gu, the 52-year-old CEO of Lara Fashion.
- Eun Hee-soo as Jin Hye-jin, the 49-year-old Belle president.
- Hong Jun-ki as Seo Hyeong-jin, a 28-year-old man who majored Internal Medicine.
- Lee Hwa-young as Sin Hyeong-ja, Yoo-na's 60-year-old mother who works as chairman's house assistant.

== Production ==
Park Hyung-joon appeared in the SBS morning drama after seven years, having last appeared in You're Only Mine in 2014. Bae Seul-ki last appeared in a daily drama four years ago in The Shining Eun-soo in 2016 on KBS1. Yoon Mi-ra appeared in the SBS 2018 morning drama I Am the Mother Too. Choi Jung-yoon came back to television drama after six years, having last appeared in Cheongdam-dong Scandal that aired between 2014 and 2015. On 26 March 2021, stills from script reading site were released by the production crew.

== Original soundtrack ==
Amor Fati

Soundtrack album by Various
- Released: 2021
- Genre: Soundtrack
- Languages: Korean; English
- Label: SBS Contents Hub/Dreamus

=== Part 1 ===
Released on April 21, 2021
No.	Title	Lyrics	Music	Artist	Length
1.	"Dash"	Lee Byeong-wook	Lee Byeong-wook	Lee Yoon-jong	3:38
2.	"Dash" (Inst.)				3:38

=== Part 2 ===
Released on April 28, 2021
No.	Title	Lyrics	Music	Artist	Length
1.	"Memories Are Scattered"	Choi Jeong-joo	Victory and Defeat	Park Ye-seul
2.	"Memories Are Scattered" (Inst.)

=== Part 3 ===
Released on May 24, 2021
No.	Title	Lyrics	Music	Artist	Length
1.	"Far Away"	Win-win-win-and-win	Win-win-and-win	The Daisy	3:49
2.	"Far Away" (Inst.)				3:49

=== Part 4 ===
Released on June 22, 2021
No.	Title	Lyrics	Music	Artist	Length
1.	"Courtship" (구애)	Park Jun-su and Sang-wook	Park Jun-su and Sang-wook	Kim Ro-min	4:11
2.	"Courtship" (Inst.)				4:11

=== Part 5 ===
Released on July 23, 2021
No.	Title	Lyrics	Music	Artist	Length
1.	"More Than Me" (나보다 그대를 더)	Choi Jeong-Joo	Park Ye-ji	Coda Bridge	3:43
2.	"More Than Me" (Inst.)				3:43

=== Part 6 ===
Released on October 1, 2021
No.	Title	Lyrics	Music	Artist	Length
1.	"I Can Only See You" (그대만 보여요)	ID and Park Jun-su	ID and Park Jun-su	Kim Ji-woong	3:12
2.	"I Can Only See You" (Inst.)				3:12

== Viewership ==
Amor Fati : South Korea viewers per episode (thousands)

Episodes	Episode number																			
Episodes	1	2	3	4	5	6	7	8	9	10	11	12	13	14	15	16	17	18	19	20
Ep.01-20	N/A	N/A	N/A	N/A	N/A	N/A	N/A	N/A	N/A	N/A	N/A	N/A	N/A	N/A	N/A	N/A	799	N/A	753	N/A
Ep.21-40	N/A	N/A	N/A	777	756	N/A	N/A	N/A	838	N/A	N/A	763	N/A	815	N/A	782	N/A	773	N/A	752
Ep.41-60	N/A	N/A	756	765	832	818	N/A	811	803	813	N/A	848	766	834	792	895	922	824	971	798
Ep.61-80	924	935	855	941	935	874	951	974	858	907	809	880	909	941	895	909	912	942	952	887
Ep.81-100	861	954	886	1048	824	1014	1006	957	1010	992	1046	1049	1083	968	956	969	1001	1093	1044	1016
Ep.101-120	986	1142	1165	1134	1013	996	1069	1005	1049	1077	TBD	693	855	1048	1012	1028	958	1000	995	970

Source: Audience measurement performed nationwide by Nielsen Korea.

Ep.	Original broadcast date	Average audience share		
Ep.	Original broadcast date	Nielsen Korea		TNmS
Ep.	Original broadcast date	Nationwide	Seoul	Nationwide
1	April 12, 2021	3.7%	—N/a	—N/a
2	April 13, 2021	4.5%	—N/a	—N/a
3	April 14, 2021	3.9%	—N/a	—N/a
4	April 15, 2021	4.4%	4.4%	4.4%
5	April 16, 2021	3.7%	—N/a	—N/a
6	April 19, 2021	4.9%	—N/a	—N/a
7	April 20, 2021	4.2%	—N/a	—N/a
8	April 21, 2021	4.3%	4.2%	—N/a
9	April 22, 2021	4.5%	4.5%	4.6%
10	April 23, 2021	3.8%	—N/a	—N/a
11	April 26, 2021	4.7%	—N/a	—N/a
12	April 27, 2021	4.6%	—N/a	—N/a
13	April 28, 2021	4.2%	—N/a	4.2%
14	April 29, 2021	4.6%	—N/a	4.4%
15	April 30, 2021	4.5%	4.5%	4.8%
16	May 3, 2021	4.8%	—N/a	5.3%
17	May 4, 2021	5.3%	5.3%	4.9%
18	May 5, 2021	4.5%	4.6%	5.8%
19	May 6, 2021	4.7%	4.4%	4.5%
20	May 7, 2021	4.2%	—N/a	4.4%
21	May 10, 2021	4.8%	—N/a	5.9%
22	May 11, 2021	4.8%	—N/a	4.9%
23	May 12, 2021	4.3%	4.2%	4.4%
24	May 13, 2021	5.1%	4.7%	5.3%
25	May 14, 2021	5.1%	4.9%	4.3%
26	May 17, 2021	5.1%	—N/a	—N/a
27	May 18, 2021	4.7%	—N/a	4.8%
28	May 19, 2021	4.5%	4.6%	5.6%
29	May 20, 2021	5.4%	4.8%	5.2%
30	May 21, 2021	4.9%	4.9%	5.6%
31	May 24, 2021	5.4%	5.3%	—N/a
32	May 25, 2021	5.3%	5.2%	5.1%
33	May 26, 2021	4.5%	—N/a	5.0%
34	May 27, 2021	5.4%	5.4%	5.4%
35	May 28, 2021	4.8%	4.7%	5.4%
36	May 31, 2021	5.3%	—N/a	5.8%
37	June 1, 2021	4.9%	—N/a	5.9%
38	June 2, 2021	5.3%	5.1%	4.7%
39	June 3, 2021	5.3%	5.1%	4.9%
40	June 4, 2021	4.8%	4.5%	5.3%
41	June 7, 2021	4.8%	—N/a	5.5%
42	June 8, 2021	5.5%	5.5%	5.0%
43	June 9, 2021	4.9%	4.4%	4.6%
44	June 10, 2021	4.9%	4.8%	5.1%
45	June 11, 2021	5.5%	5.4%	5.5%
46	June 14, 2021	5.1%	—N/a	5.0%
47	June 15, 2021	5.2%	5.1%	5.7%
48	June 16, 2021	5.2%	5.3%	4.9%
49	June 17, 2021	5.1%	4.8%	4.7%
50	June 18, 2021	5.3%	—N/a	5.2%
51	June 21, 2021	4.6%	—N/a	5.4%
52	June 22, 2021	5.6%	5.6%	5.2%
53	June 23, 2021	5.0%	4.7%	5.3%
54	June 24, 2021	5.4%	5.2%	4.8%
55	June 25, 2021	5.3%	5.2%	5.3%
56	June 28, 2021	5.9%	5.6%	5.7%
57	June 29, 2021	5.8%	5.3%	5.7%
58	June 30, 2021	5.2%	4.8%	6.0%
59	July 1, 2021	6.2%	6.0%	5.6%
60	July 2, 2021	5.3%	5.1%	5.3%
61	July 5, 2021	6.1%	6.1%	5.8%
62	July 6, 2021	6.3%	5.7%	6.1%
63	July 7, 2021	5.8%	5.2%	5.6%
64	July 8, 2021	6.0%	5.2%	5.8%
65	July 9, 2021	6.2%	5.9%	6.0%
66	July 12, 2021	5.7%	5.2%	5.6%
67	July 13, 2021	6.0%	6.1%	6.0%
68	July 14, 2021	6.0%	6.1%	5.7%
69	July 15, 2021	5.6%	5.3%	5.5%
70	July 16, 2021	5.8%	5.6%	6.3%
71	July 19, 2021	5.3%	5.0%	5.8%
72	July 20, 2021	5.8%	5.6%	5.9%
73	July 21, 2021	6.1%	6.1%	5.6%
74	July 22, 2021	6.1%	6.2%	6.2%
75	July 23, 2021	5.8%	5.4%	6.3%
76	July 26, 2021	5.7%	5.2%	6.0%
77	July 27, 2021	5.8%	5.7%	—N/a
78	July 28, 2021	5.9%	5.7%	—N/a
79	July 29, 2021	5.7%	5.4%	5.9%
80	July 30, 2021	5.8%	5.7%	6.1%
81	August 9, 2021	5.5%	4.9%	—N/a
82	August 10, 2021	5.6%	5.3%	—N/a
83	August 11, 2021	6.0%	5.8%	—N/a
84	August 12, 2021	6.5%	6.4%	—N/a
85	August 13, 2021	5.0%	4.7%	5.3%
86	August 16, 2021	6.3%	6.0%	6.2%
87	August 17, 2021	6.3%	6.2%	6.6%
88	August 18, 2021	6.3%	6.3%	6.5%
89	August 19, 2021	6.3%	6.0%	6.8%
90	August 20, 2021	6.4%	6.0%	6.6%
91	August 23, 2021	6.5%	6.1%	6.8%
92	August 24, 2021	6.9%	6.7%	6.9%
93	August 25, 2021	6.8%	6.7%	7.1%
94	August 26, 2021	6.3%	5.9%	7.0%
95	August 27, 2021	5.9%	5.3%	7.2%
96	August 30, 2021	6.1%	5.9%	6.3%
97	August 31, 2021	6.2%	6.0%	7.0%
98	September 1, 2021	6.3%	6.3%	6.4%
99	September 2, 2021	6.4%	6.1%	6.9%
100	September 3, 2021	6.6%	6.3%	6.6%
101	September 6, 2021	6.4%	6.2%	6.2%
102	September 7, 2021	7.0%	7.0%	7.3%
103	September 8, 2021	7.0%	6.7%	6.9%
104	September 9, 2021	6.9%	7.0%	6.9%
105	September 10, 2021	6.2%	5.8%	—N/a
106	September 13, 2021	6.1%	5.6%	6.7%
107	September 14, 2021	6.5%	6.2%	6.7%
108	September 15, 2021	6.1%	5.8%	5.8%
109	September 16, 2021	6.3%	5.8%	6.1%
110	September 17, 2021	6.4%	5.6%	7.3%
111	September 20, 2021	4.2%	4.8%	—N/a
112	September 21, 2021	3.1%	—N/a	—N/a
113	September 22, 2021	5.5%	5.5%	5.3%
114	September 23, 2021	6.4%	6.3%	6.6%
115	September 24, 2021	6.6%	6.2%	6.2%
116	September 27, 2021	5.8%	5.4%	6.5%
117	September 28, 2021	6.1%	5.6%	6.5%
118	September 29, 2021	6.1%	5.9%	7.4%
119	September 30, 2021	6.2%	5.9%	6.4%
120	October 1, 2021	5.7%	5.6%	6.2%
Average		_	—	—
In this table, the blue numbers represent the lowest ratings and the red numbers represent the highest ratings.; N/A denotes that the rating is unknown.
