= Kim Gyu-ri =

Kim Gyu-ri may refer to:

- Kim Gyu-ri (actress, born June 1979)
- Kim Gyu-ri (actress, born August 1979)
