= Kim Ji-hyun (singer) =

South Korean singer and actress

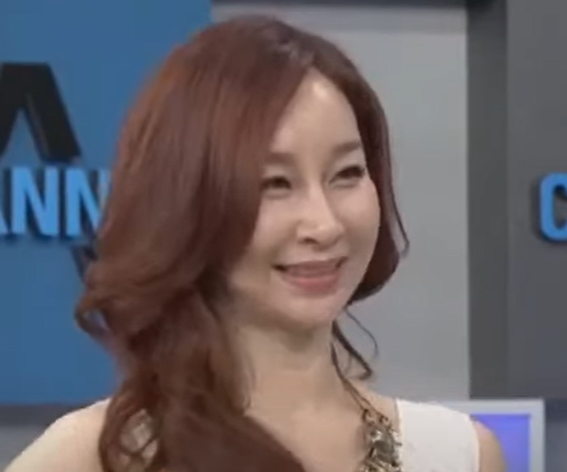
- Kim in 2013
- Born: August 16, 1972 (age 54); South Korea
- Occupations: Singer; actress
- Years active: 1994–present
- Musical career
- Genres: Hip hop; dance-pop; reggae
- Instrument: Vocals
- Years active: 1994–2001; 2003; 2009

Korean name
- Hangul: 김지현
- RR: Gim Jihyeon
- MR: Kim Chihyŏn

Kim Ji-hyun (Korean: 김지현; born August 16, 1972) is a South Korean singer and actress. She debuted in 1994 as a member of the best-selling pop group, Roo'ra, which she left in 1997 to release her first solo album, "Cat's Eye." Kim rejoined Roo'ra in 1999, and remained a member until the group disbanded in 2001. She released her second solo album, Second Time, in 2003, and participated in Roo'ra's reunion in 2009.

== Discography ==
Title	Album details	Peak chart positions	Sales
Title	Album details	KOR	Sales
Cat's Eye	Released: January 1997; Label: Interpark; Format: CD, cassette	—N/a	—N/a
Second Time	Released: February 24, 2003; Label: Sangmind; Format: CD, cassette	33	KOR: 9,949

== Filmography ==
- Summertime (2001)
