= Jung Woong-in =

South Korean actor (born 1971)

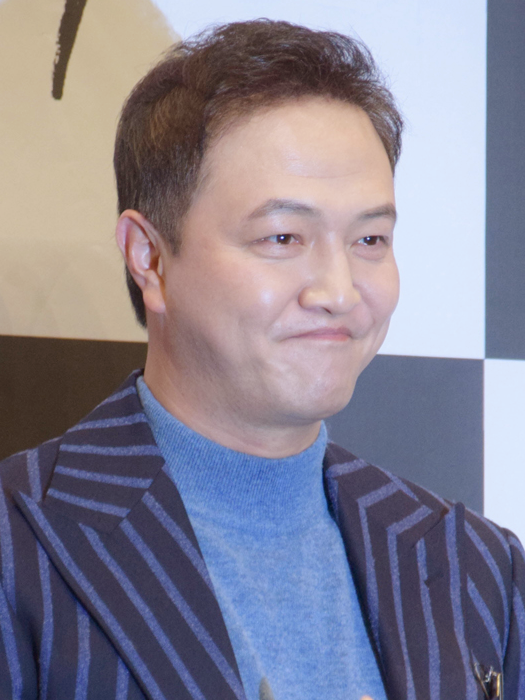
- Jung in December 2019
- Born: January 20, 1971 (age 55); Jecheon, South Korea
- Education: Seoul Institute of the Arts
- Occupation: Actor
- Years active: 1995–present
- Agent: Just Entertainment
- Spouse: Lee Ji-in (m. 2006)
- Children: 3

Korean name
- Hangul: 정웅인
- Hanja: 鄭雄仁
- RR: Jeong Ungin
- MR: Chŏng Ungin
- Website: justent.co.kr/artist

Jung Woong-in (Korean: 정웅인; born January 20, 1971) is a South Korean actor. He is known for his television series Ojakgyo Family, I Can Hear Your Voice and Netflix film Seoul Vibe.

== Early life ==
Jung Woong-in was born on January 20, 1971, in Jecheon-eup, Jecheon-gun, North Chungcheong Province as the eldest of two sons. Jung completed his primary education at Seoul Gongneung Elementary School in 1983 and later graduated from Wongok Middle School in 1986. He then attended Yangmyeong High School, where he accidentally discovered his passion for acting while attending a theater class. After graduating in 1989, he pursued his studies in Theater and completed his Bachelor of Arts degree at Seoul Institute of the Arts in 1994.

Jung was also known as a strict senior who enforced discipline on new juniors. He worked on the theater stage for a long time but decided to pursue a career in broadcasting due to difficult family circumstances. He entered the film industry with "Rehearsal" and made his official debut in 1996 with the drama "Thousand and One Nights".

== Career ==
Since his debut, Jung Woong-in has played minor roles in several works before gaining attention for his role as loyal gangster Chun-sik in "Eunsil" in 1998, which recorded a high audience rating of 38.5%. He also received recognition for his performance in "Kook-hee" in 1999, which recorded a high audience rating of 53.1%, and won the Rookie of the Year award for his role as capitalist Kim Sang-hoon.

In 2000, Jung Woong-in gained popularity as a comical character in the MBC adult sitcom "Three Friends" alongside Yoon Da-hoon and Park Sang-myeon, which recorded a high viewership rating of 30%.

He continued to build his filmography with various genres, including historical dramas and modern plays, such as "Foul King" (2000), "Dust Master" (2001), "Don't Tell Papa" (2004), "Death Master," "Wizards" (2006), "Unfortunate The City" (2009), "Hong Guk-young" (2001), "Cheersy Women" (2005), "The Last Scandal in My Life" (2007), "Queen Seondeok" (2008), "Coffee House" (2010), and "Ojakgyo Family" (2011).

In 2007, Jung appeared in family weekend drama Last Scandal. In 2008 he acted as Lady Mishil's brother Misaeng in historical drama Queen Seondeok.

In 2011, Jung starred in family drama Ojakgyo Family as Hwang Tae-shik, the oldest son of the family. He won best supporting actor award in KBS Drama Awards for the role.

In 2013, Jung starred in Fists of Legend.

Jung played villain character Min Joon-gook in SBS drama I Can Hear Your Voice. His character is extremely popular. He became known for his lines such as "I will kill you if you talk" and "I will kill the person who listens to you," which were parodied on the Internet and entertainment shows, and established himself as a representative buzzword that reminds people of him.

"Director Jo Soo-won, who directed I Can Hear Your Voice, said that the first movie he saw after directing Cheongdam-dong Alice was Fists of Legend. They said they cast me after seeing me in that movie. However, the reason the director had no choice but to think was because the viewers formed a consensus when I played the villain. After thinking about it, the director made a bold decision and called me. I was really grateful."

He was titled as the best villain of 2013.

He then acted as a terrifying villain in Empress Ki.

In 2014, Jung appeared in MBC Family Entertainment's Dad! Where Are We Going? Season 2 alongside his eldest daughter Jeong Se-yoon.

He also starred in the film Veteran in 2015.

== Personal life ==
While attending a college classmate's wedding in March 2005, Jung met Lee Ji-in, who was a college student at the time and was 12 years younger than him. They got married on June 3, 2006.

The two currently have three daughters: eldest daughter Jeong Se-yoon (born 2007), second daughter Jeong So-yoon (born 2009), and third daughter Jeong Da-yun (born 2012).

== Filmography ==
=== Film ===
Film performances
Year	Title		Role	Notes	Ref.
Year	English	Korean	Role	Notes	Ref.
1995	Rehearsal	리허설 (1995년 영화)			
1996	Boss	보스 (영화)			
1996	Unknown King	미지왕			
1996	Seven Rascals	7악동			
1998	The Quiet Family	조용한 가족			
1999	A Great Chinese Restaurant	북경반점 (영화)	Ramen		
2000	The Foul King	반칙왕			
2001	My Boss, My Hero	두사부일체	Kim Sang-du		
2002	2424	2424	Choi Doo-chil		
2003	The Circle	써클	Jo Myung-gu/Kim Gwang-lim		
2004	Don't Tell Papa	돈 텔 파파	Kim Cheol-soo		
2006	My Boss, My Teacher	투사부일체	Kim Sang-du		
2006	The Magicians	마법사들	Jae-seong		
2006	Mr. Wacky			cameo	
2006	Flushed Away		Whitey	animated, 2006 (Korean dubbing)	
2007	Are You Crazy?	미친거 아니야	Na Dae-beom		
2008	Santamaria	잘못된 만남	Il-do		
2009	City of Damnation	유감스러운 도시	Lee Joong-dae		
2010	Meet the In-Laws	위험한 상견례	man on blind date	cameo	
2011	Marrying the Mafia 4: Unstoppable Family	가문의 영광 (영화 시리즈)	Kim Hyeon-joon		
2013	Fists of Legend	전설의 주먹	Son Jin-ho		
2015	Veteran	베테랑	Driver Bae		
2016	Time Renegades	시간이탈자	Kang Hyung-chul		
2017	The Prison	프리즌	Government Kang		
2020	Shooting girls	슈팅걸스	Director Kim Soo-cheol		
2022	Seoul Vibe	서울대작전	Chief Prosecutor	Netflix Film	
2022	Child for Children	아이를 위한 아이	Seung-won		
TBA	Drive		Na Jin-soo		

=== Television series ===
Year	Title		Role	Note	Ref.
Year	English	Korean	Role	Note	Ref.
1997	One Thousand and One Night	천일야화			
1997	Miss & Mr.	미스 & 미스터			
1997	Yesterday	예스터데이			
1998	Soonpoong Clinic	순풍산부인과	CATV PD, Dae-yeol		
1998	White Nights 3.98	백야 3.98	Baek Seung-je	Signalman of Jang Baek-ho unit	
1998	Eun-shil	은실이	Hwang Chun-shik		
1999	Wave	파도	Ma Nam-su		
1999	Kuk-hee	국희	Kim Sang-hoon		
2000	Three Friends	세 친구	Jung Woong-in		
2000	Because of You	당신 때문에	Ahn Soo-chang		
2001	Hong Guk-young	홍국영	Jung Hoo-gyeom		
2006	Rude Women	발칙한 여자들	Jeong-Seok		
2007	Moon Hee	문희	Ha Moon-ho	Moon Hyung-cheol's first son, Ha Moon-hee's half-brother	
2008	Last Scandal	내생애 마지막 스캔들	Jang Dong-hwa		
2009	Queen Seondeok	선덕여왕	Mi-saeng		
2009	Three Men	세남자	Jung Wong-in		
2009–2010	High Kick Through the Roof	지붕 뚫고 하이킥	bank robber	Cameo, Eps. 103	
2010	Coffee House	커피하우스	Han Ji-won		
2010–2011	The King of Legend	근초고왕	Wi Bi-rang		
2011–2012	Ojakgyo Family	오작교 형제들	Hwang Tae-sik		
2012	Drama Special Series: Amore Mio	드라마 스페셜 연작시리즈: 아모레미오	Kang Hae-chang		
2012	Drama Special Series: SOS – Save Our School	드라마 스페셜 연작시리즈: SOS - 우리 학교를 구해줘	Kim Eun-sub		
2013	I Can Hear Your Voice	너의 목소리가 들려	Min Joon-kook		
2013	KBS Drama Special: Happy! Rose Day	KBS 드라마 스페셜: Happy! 로즈데이			
2013	Empress Ki	기황후	Yeom Byung-soo		
2013	Potato Star 2013QR3	감자별 2013QR3	dog's voice	Cameo, Eps. 15	
2014	Pinocchio	피노키오	Min Joon-gook	Cameo	
2015	Splendid Politics	화정	Lee Yi-cheom		
2015	Yong-pal	용팔이	Lee Ho-joon		
2015	Sweet, Savage Family	달콤살벌 패밀리	Baek Gi-bum		
2016	Monster	몬스터	Moon Tae-gwang		
2017	My Sassy Girl	엽기적인 그녀	Jung Ki-joon		
2017	Prison Playbook	슬기로운 감빵생활	Paeng Se-yoon	Assistant Chief	
2018	Switch	스위치 - 세상을 바꿔라	Geum Tae-woong		
2018	Goodbye to Goodbye	이별이 떠났다	Jung Soo-chul		
2018	Ms. Ma, Nemesis	미스 마, 복수의 여신	Han Tae-kyu		
2019	Chief of Staff	보좌관 - 세상을 움직이는 사람들	Oh Won-sik		
2019	Woman of 9.9 Billion	99억의 여자	Hong In-pyo		
2020	Delayed Justice	날아라 개천용	Jang Yoon-suk		
2021	Idol: The Coup	아이돌 : The Coup	Ma Jin-woo		
2022	Insider	인사이더	chaebol man	Cameo, Eps. 1	
2023	Our Blooming Youth	청춘월담	Jo Won-bo		
2023	The Good Bad Mother	나쁜엄마	Oh Tae-soo		
2023	Moon in the Day	낮에 뜨는 달	Seok Chul-hwan		
2023	The Killing Vote	국민사형투표	Kang Seok-ju	Cameo, Eps 12	
2024	Nothing Uncovered	멱살 한번 잡힙시다	Seol Pan-ho		
2026	Sword & Silence	문무	Kim Jin-ju		

=== Web series ===
List of Web Series
Year	Title		Role	Note	Ref.
Year	English	Korean	Role	Note	Ref.
2014	SNS mobile drama: Love in Memory 2 - Dad's Notes	SNS 모바일 드라마: 러브 인 메모리 2 - 아빠의 노트	Oh Hyun-soo	Broadcast on mobile content distribution platform Storyball	
2022	Pachinko		Koh Jong-yul	Apple TV+ Original Series	
2022	Big Bet	카지노	Cameo	Disney+ Original Series	
2022	Rose Mansion	장미맨션	Jang Won-seok	TVING Original Series	
2022	People in the Blue House	People in the Blue House	Mayor of Seoul	Main Role (Wavve Original Series)	
2025	Confidence Queen	컨피던스 맨 KR	Special appearance Jeon Tae-soo	On Prime Video, September 6	

=== Television show ===
Year	Title	Role	Notes/Ref.
1999	Good Friends - Introduction to Psychology Black and White	Cast Members	
2011–2012	Saturday Night Live Korea	Cast Members	
2013–2014	Dad! Where Are We Going? Season 1	Cast Members	With his daughters

== Stage ==
Theater play performances of Jung Woong-in
Year	Title		Role	Venue	Date	Ref.
Year	English	Korean	Role	Venue	Date	Ref.
2009	Dandelions in the Wind	민들레 바람 되어	Ahn Joong-ki	Daehak-ro Free Theatre	February 13 to June 14	
2009	Dandelions in the Wind	민들레 바람 되어	Ahn Joong-ki	CMB Expo Art Hall Daejeon	June 26 to 28	
2009	Dandelions in the Wind	민들레 바람 되어	Ahn Joong-ki	Daegu Bongsan Cultural Centre	September 3 to 13	
2009	Dandelions in the Wind	민들레 바람 되어	Ahn Joong-ki	Shinsegae Centum City Cultural Hall (9th floor) - Busan	September 17 to 27	
2009	Dandelions in the Wind	민들레 바람 되어	Ahn Joong-ki	Gyeonggi Art Centre Small Theatre - Suwon	October 10 to 11	
2009–2010	University of Laughs	웃음의 대학	Geom Yeol-gwan	Art One Theatre 2	November 26 to July 25	
2010	University of Laughs	웃음의 대학	Geom Yeol-gwan	COEX Art Hall	March 13 to 27	
2010–2011	University of Laughs	웃음의 대학	Geom Yeol-gwan	Wonder Space Circle Theater (Art Center K Circle Theater)	December 3 to February 14	
2011	University of Laughs	웃음의 대학	Geom Yeol-gwan	Dongsoong Art Center Small Theater	June 24 to September 18	
2011	University of Laughs	웃음의 대학	Geom Yeol-gwan	NH Art Hall Fantastic Hall	October 1 to 2	
2011	University of Laughs	웃음의 대학	Geom Yeol-gwan	Dongtan Complex Culture Center Banseok Art Hall	October 15 to 16	
2011	University of Laughs	웃음의 대학	Geom Yeol-gwan	Bosakol Cultural Center	October 21 to 22	
2012	Clumsy People	서툰 사람들	Jang Deok-bae	Seoul Dongsoong Art Center small theater	January 11 to May 28	
2012–2013	Thursday Romance	그와 그녀의 목요일	Historian Professor, Jeong-Min	Seoul Arts Center Jayu Theater	December 3 to 30	
2012–2013	Thursday Romance	그와 그녀의 목요일	Historian Professor, Jeong-Min	Suhyunjae Theater (DCF Daemyung Cultural Factory 3rd floor)	March 1 to May 11	
2015	Alcohol, Tears and Jekyll & Hyde	술과 눈물과 지킬앤하이드	Dr. Jekyll	Dongsoong Art Center Dongsoong Hall	March 1 to July 8	
2018	Richard III	리차드 3세	Richard III	Seoul Arts Centre CJ Towol Theatre	February 6 to March 4	
2021	Ice	얼음	Detective 1 (Cho Doo-man)	Sejong Center S Theater	January 8 to March 21, 2021	
2021	Ice	얼음	Detective 1 (Cho Doo-man)	Seongnam Arts Center	May 14 to 16, 2021	

== Awards and nominations ==
Awards and nominations
Year	Award	Category	Recipient	Result	Ref.
1999	SBS Drama Awards	Best New Actor	Eun-sil	Won	
2000	MBC Comedy Awards	Best Performance in a Sitcom	Three Friends	Nominated	
2010	17th SBS Drama Awards	Best Supporting Actor (Special Planning Drama)	Coffee House	Nominated	
2011	2011 KBS Drama Awards	Best Supporting Actor	Ojakgyo Family	Won	
2012	KBS Drama Awards	Men's series, one-act drama	Drama Special Series - Amore Mio	Nominated	
2013	Korea Drama Awards	Top Excellence Award, Actor	I Can Hear Your Voice	Won	
2013	2nd APAN Star Awards APAN Star Awards	Acting Award, Actor	I Can Hear Your Voice	Won	
2013	20th SBS Drama Awards	Special Award, Actor in a Miniseries	I Can Hear Your Voice	Won	
2013	KBS Drama Awards	Men's series, one-act drama	Drama Special - Happy! rose day	Nominated	
2014	MBC Entertainment Awards	PD Award	Dad! Where Are We Going?	Won	
2014	2014 SBS Drama Awards	Special Award, Actor in a Serial Drama	Endless Love	Won	
2015	34th MBC Drama Awards	Best Supporting Actor in a Special Project Drama	Splendid Politics	Nominated	
2015	34th MBC Drama Awards	Male Excellence Award for Miniseries	Sweet, Savage Family	Nominated	
2015	23rd SBS Drama Awards	Special Award, Actor in a Miniseries	Yong-pal	Nominated	
2017	25th SBS Drama Awards	Excellence Award, Actor in a Monday–Tuesday Drama	My Sassy Girl	Nominated	
2018	2018 MBC Drama Awards	Excellence Award, Actor in a Weekend Special Project	Goodbye to Goodbye	Nominated	
2018	6th APAN Star Awards	Top Excellence Award, Actor in a Serial Drama	Goodbye to Goodbye	Nominated	
2018	26th SBS Drama Awards	Excellence Award, Actor in a Daily and Weekend Drama	Ms. Ma, Nemesis	Won	
2019	KBS Drama Awards	Best Supporting Actor in a Miniseries	Woman of 9.9 Billion	Won	
