= Bunshinsaba 2 =

- Film poster
- Directed by: Ahn Byeong-ki
- Written by: Han Jinglong; Ham Joong-min
- Produced by: Pei Lin
- Starring: Xin Zhilei; Park Han-byul; Zhang Haoran; Sienna Li; Sun Shaolong; Yang Fan; Zhang Tingting
- Cinematography: Choi Sang-mok
- Edited by: Hahm Sung-won
- Production company: China Film Co-Production Corporation
- Release date: 16 July 2013 (China)
- Running time: 94 minutes
- Country: China
- Language: Mandarin
- Box office: CN¥80 million (US$13 million)

Bunshinsaba 2 (simplified Chinese: 笔仙II; traditional Chinese: 筆仙II; pinyin: Bǐxiān II) is a 2013 Chinese horror film directed by Ahn Byeong-ki.

== Plot ==
A group of six: Song Qian, Nana, You Feng, Yufei, Yang Zheng, and Hongrui have gone their separate ways after attaining their bachelor's degree, with Song Qian pursuing her master's degree, Nana going to the United States, You Feng working as a business executive, Yufei becoming an actress, Yang Zheng opening an art gallery while waiting his chance to become a director, and Hongrui struggling on odd jobs while staying at Yang Zheng's house. Nana returns home and inquires to Song Qian and Yang Zheng about the deceased Xiao Ai haunting her. Ten years ago, the six friends had included Xiao Ai in their clique, with Hongrui, who played tennis before he got his leg cast, falling in love with her, much to the chagrin of Nana, who was in love with Hongrui. She blamed Xiao Ai on the misfortunes that the six experienced lately and, following a reading using a ouija board, singled her out as Yuki, a girl from Nana and Song Qian's past who was regarded as a freak for apparently causing misfortunes around her, including the death of Song Qian's father. Xiao Ai committed suicide by jumping from a building after Song Qian declared her refusal to talk to her again.

While having sex with a prostitute, Yang Zheng is killed when a machinery crushes him. Hongrui, who is struggling to make a living, blackmails You Feng into giving him money in exchange for not revealing a secret video that could potentially scandalize him and Yufei, with whom You Feng is maintaining relationship with, despite him having married his boss' daughter. Hongrui is then killed through multiple cuts by an unknown figure. Seconds later, You Feng and Yufei sneak into Yang Zheng's residence to get the flash containing the video, but Nana has already got it.

Yufei is the next to be killed when she gets stabbed inside her house. Song Qian learns from You Feng that Nana came to the United States not to pursue her studies, but to attend a mental facility. Nana visits Song Qian several times afterward, restless because of Xiao Ai's terrors. Song Qian takes Hongrui's flash from Nana's grasp while she is sleeping and watches the video, learning that Xiao Ai died not because of suicide but because she accidentally fell while attempting to strangle Nana for making Song Qian reject her. The five then dispose of Xiao Ai by making it look like she had committed suicide.

You Feng chases Nana to the building where Xiao Ai was disposed years ago. He reveals to Song Qian that he is the one who murdered their friends, not Xiao Ai, as he fears that they will stream the video and scandalize him, since he suggested the method of Xiao Ai's disposal. However, Nana manages to kill him by impaling him with a metal rod.

Several months later, Song Qian meets Nana and tells her that everything is over. The camera turns to reveal that Xiao Ai is grasping Nana and about to slash her neck, saying that "once Nana is killed, they (Xiao Ai and Song Qian) can be together". Song Qian is shocked, but slowly gives a smile.

After the after-credit, there is a flashback replaying all characters, including their conclusions and opinions when they were still alive in the past.

== Cast ==
- Xin Zhilei as Nana
- Park Han-byul as Song Qian
- Zhang Haoran as You Feng
- Sienna Li as Yu-fei
- Sun Shaolong as Yang Zheng
- Yang Fan as Hongrui
- Zhang Tingting as Xiao Ai

== Reception ==
The film grossed CN¥80 million (US$13 million) at the Chinese box office. Film Business Asia's Derek Elley gave the film a rating of 6 out of 10.

== Plot Source ==
Bunshinsaba 2 is a remake of the 2000 South Korean film Nightmare a.k.a. Horror Game Movie by the same director.
