= Park Han-byul =

South Korean actress and model (born 1984)

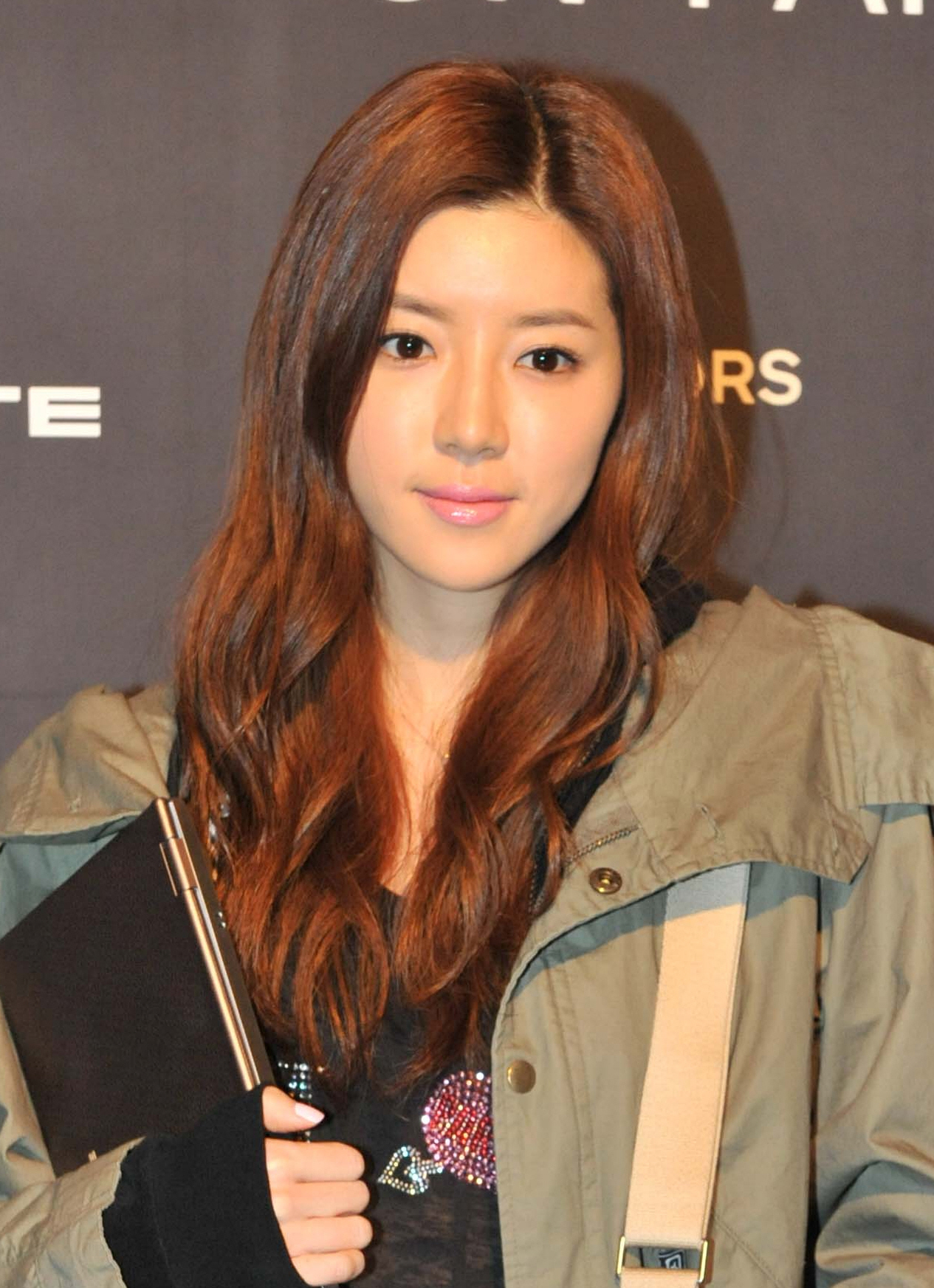
- Park in 2010
- Born: November 17, 1984 (age 41); Seoul, South Korea
- Education: Konkuk University
- Occupations: Actress; model
- Years active: 2001–2019
- Agent: Chan Entertainment
- Spouse: Yoo In-suk (m. 2017)
- Children: 2

Korean name
- Hangul: 박한별
- Hanja: 朴韓별
- RR: Bak Hanbyeol
- MR: Pak Hanbyŏl

Park Han-byul (Korean: 박한별; born November 17, 1984) is a South Korean actress and model.

== Career ==
As a student at Anyang Art High School, Park posted photographs of herself on the internet, becoming an online celebrity due to her close physical resemblance to actress Jun Ji-hyun. After being signed by an entertainment agency, she made her acting debut in the 2003 horror film Wishing Stairs, her part requiring her to learn ballet over a two-month period of rigorous training.

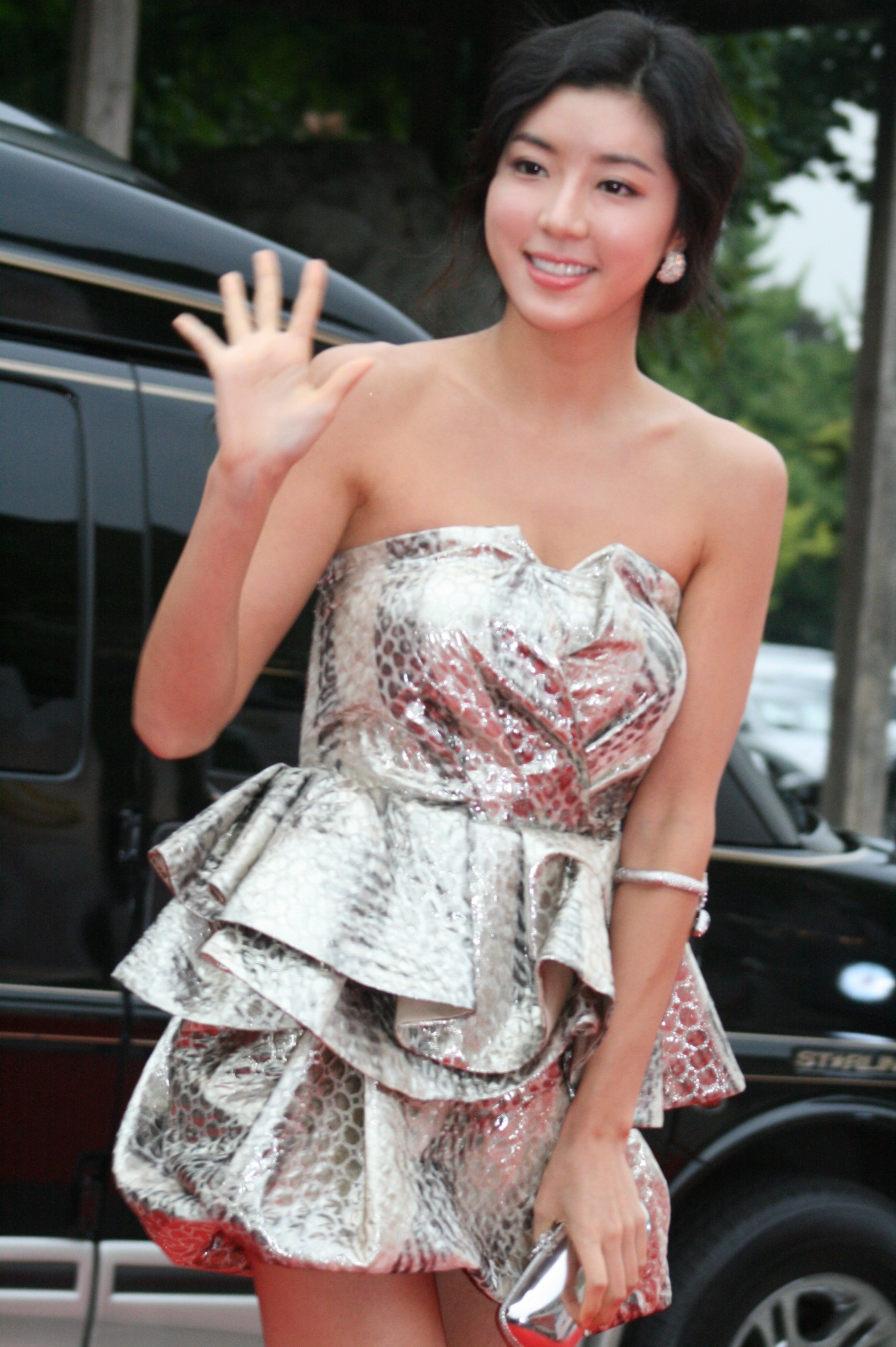
Park at the 2009 Seoul International Drama Awards

Having since appeared in a succession of television drama series, Park returned to the big screen with a role in the 2008 film Fate. She then went on to star in the horror film Yoga later the same year. In 2010, Park starred in the coming-of-age film My Black Mini Dress, based on the same titled chick lit novel by Kim Min-seo.

In July 2012, Park co-starred with Kim Ji-seok in horror film Two Moons, playing the role of So-hee, a horror fiction novelist with a hidden secret. Park then starred in another horror film Bunshinsaba 2 directed by Ahn Byeong-ki, marking her acting debut in China.

Park returned to TV, starring in the daily drama One Well-Raised Daughter. In 2015, she starred in the melodrama I Have a Lover, where she attracted attention with her portrayal of a morally ambiguous woman. In 2017, she took on the titular role in MBC's variety drama Borg Mom.

In 2019, Park is set to star in the romance melodrama Love in Sadness, a remake of the 1999 TBS drama Beautiful Person.

== Personal life ==
=== Relationships ===
In June 2009, K-pop singer Seven acknowledged on his website that he and Park had been in a relationship for seven years, with the couple having first met when they were seniors in high school. Seven had previously denied rumors that they were a couple in order to protect Park's privacy and let the relationship grow naturally. On December 23, 2014, a statement was released by Park's agency stating that she and Seven had ended their 12-year relationship earlier on in the year.

On November 24, 2017, it was announced that Park had married a non-celebrity earlier that year, and that they planned to have the ceremony in 2018 with family and friends. The couple had met three years prior and entered into a relationship sometime in the beginning of 2017. It was also announced that Park was 15 weeks pregnant. On April 30, 2018, it was reported that Park had given birth to a son. On May 31, 2022, the agency announced that Park is pregnant with a second child. On August 17, 2022, it was announced that Park had given birth to a second child.

== Filmography ==
=== Film ===
Year	Title	Role	Ref.
2003	Wishing Stairs	Kim So-hee	
2008	Fate	Jung Eun-young	
2009	Yoga	Sung Yeon-joo	
2011	My Black Mini Dress	Yoon Hye-ji	
2012	Two Moons	So-hee	
2013	Bunshinsaba 2	Song Qian	

=== Television series ===
Year	Title	Role	Ref.
2003	My Fair Lady	Choi Soo-yeon	
2004	Han River Ballad	Mi-ae	
2006	Couple or Trouble	Oh Yoo-kyung	
2006	Freeze	Kim Ji-woo	
2007	Blue Fish	Kang Yoon-jung	
2007	Couple Breaking	Han Yeo-kyung	
2009	Jolly Widows	Han Jin-kyung	
2010	Oh! My Lady	Hong Yoo-ra	
2011	Bolder By the Day	Lee Han-byul	
2013	One Well-Raised Daughter	Jang Ha-na / Jang Eun-sung	
2015	A Girl Who Sees Smells	Joo Ma-ri (ep.2)	
2015	I Have a Lover	Kang Seol-ri	
2016	Entourage	Herself (ep.3)	
2017	Borg Mom	Borg Mom	
2019	Love in Sadness	Yoon Ma-ri	

=== Television shows ===
Year	Title	Notes	Ref.
2003–2004	Inkigayo	Host	

== Awards and nominations ==
Year	Award	Category	Nominated work	Result	Ref.
2003	11th SBS Drama Awards	New Star Award	My Fair Lady	Won	
2009	23rd KBS Drama Awards	Best New Actress	Jolly Widows	Nominated	
2010	5th Asia Model Festival Awards	Fashionista Award	—N/a	Won	
2014	7th Korea Drama Awards	Excellence Award, Actress	One Well-Raised Daughter	Nominated	
2014	22nd SBS Drama Awards	Excellence Award, Actress in a Serial Drama	One Well-Raised Daughter	Nominated	
2015	8th SBS Entertainment Awards	Best Entertainer Award	Law of the Jungle	Won	
2015	23rd SBS Drama Awards	Special Acting Award, Actress in a Serial Drama	I Have a Lover	Won	
2017	MBC Entertainment Awards	Excellent Award, in Show/Sitcom Category	Borg Mom	Won	
