= Lee Kyung-jin =

South Korean actress (born 1956)

- Portrait of Lee
- Born: 2 October 1956 (age 70); Seoul, South Korea
- Other name: Lee Kyeong-jin
- Education: Hoseo University
- Occupation: Actress
- Years active: 1974–present
- Agent: Dahong Entertainment
- Known for: Joseon Survival Period; Amor Fati; Three Bold Siblings

Lee Kyung-jin is a South Korean actress. She is known for her roles in dramas such as Working Mom Parenting Daddy, Joseon Survival Period, Through the Waves, Amor Fati and Three Bold Siblings. She also appeared in movies Love in Magic, Almost Love, 26 Years Diary, Love Forecast and Ayla: The Daughter of War.

== Filmography ==
=== Television series ===
Year	Title	Role	Ref.
1981	Great Vocation	Okhawa	
1991	Mirror of Eastern Medicine	Da-hee	
1992	Enchantment	Hye-ki	
1993	The Third Republic	Park Young-ok	
1996	Dad is the Boss	Mayor's wife	
1998	Three Kim Generation	Park Young-ok	
1999	Wave	Lee Kyung-jin	
2000	All About Eve	Hyong-chul's mother	
2001	Beautiful Days	Jung Myung-ja	
2003	Forever Love	Ms. Cho	
2003	Scent of a Man	Eun-hae's mother	
2003	Swan Lake	Oh Hye-ya	
2004	Father of the Sea	Je Chun-daek	
2004	Phoenix	Jo Hyun-sook	
2005	Spring Day	Eun-ho's mother	
2005	Women Above Flowers	Dong-ji's mother	
2005	Rules of Love	Geun-young's	
2007	Capital Scandal	Yeo-kyung's mother	
2007	Mackerel Run	Lee Geum-ja	
2007	Crazy For You	Yoo Sook-ja	
2007	Dal-ja's Spring	Jung Jung-ae	
2008	Powerful Opponents	First Lady Shin Ok-hee	
2008	Cooking up Romance	Kang Ok-ja	
2008	Gourment	Jin-soo's mother	
2009	Cinderella Man	Yoo-jin's mother	
2010	You Don't Know Women	Han Pyung-ja	
2011	If Tomorrow Comes	Yoon Won-ja	
2011	Drama Special Series: "Special Task Force MSS"	Kang Kyung-hee	
2011	Lie to Me	Shim Ae-kyung	
2013	Pots of Gold	Jin-sook	
2014	My Dear Cat	Han Young-sook	
2015	All is Well	Kim Soon-im	
2015	D-Day	Park Yoon-sook	
2016	Working Mom Parenting Daddy	Ok Soo-ran	
2017	Saimdang, Memoir of Colors	Lady Hee	
2018	Through the Waves	Lee Ok-boon	
2018	Love to the End	Lee Jung-in	
2019	Joseon Survival Period	Queen Munjeong	
2021	Amor Fati	Seo Soon-boon	
2022	Doctor Lawyer	Jayden's mother	
2022	Three Bold Siblings	Yoo Jung-suk	

=== Film ===
Year	Title	Role
1995	The Eternal Empire	Warrior
2005	Tale of Cinema	Sang-won's mother
2005	Love in Magic	Koo Hee-won's mother
2006	Almost Love	Jin Dal-rae's mother
2007	26 Years Diary	Lee Soo-geon
2012	Like Rain Like Music	Mrs. Jung
2013	It's Time to Love	On-yoo's mother
2015	Love Forecast	Joon-soo's mother
2015	Circle of Atonement	Yoo-shin's mother
2017	Ayla: The Daughter of War	Ayla
2023	Sleep	Soo-jin's mother

== Awards and nominations ==
Name of the award ceremony, year presented, category, nominee of the award, and the result of the nomination
Year	Award	Category	Nominee / Work	Result	Ref.
1981	8th Korea Broadcasting Awards	Best Acting Award	Evada	Won	
1981	17th Baeksang Arts Awards	Best New Actress in TV	Evada	Won	
1983	19th Baeksang Arts Awards	Best Actress Award in TV	Evada	Won	
1985	1st KBS Self-Evaluation Awards	Best Acting Award	Equatorial Front	Won	
1998	Ministry of Oceans and Fisheries	Honorary Seafarer Certificate	Herself	Won	
