= 2014 SBS Drama Awards =

22nd edition of award ceremony

- Date: December 31, 2014
- Site: COEX Hall D in Samseong-dong, Seoul
- Hosted by: Lee Hwi-jae; Park Seo-joon; Park Shin-hye

Television coverage
- Network: SBS

The 2014 SBS Drama Awards is a ceremony honoring the best performances in television on the SBS network for the year 2014. It was held at the COEX Hall D in Samseong-dong, Seoul on December 31, 2014, and hosted by Lee Hwi-jae, Park Seo-joon, and Park Shin-hye.

== Nominations and winners ==
Complete list of nominees and winners:

(Winners denoted in bold)

Grand Prize (Daesang)	SBS Special Award
**Jun Ji-hyun** - **My Love from the Star as Cheon Song-yi**	**Lee Jong-suk** - **Pinocchio as Choi Dal-po/Ki Ha-myung** / **Doctor Stranger as Park Hoon**
Top Excellence Award, Actor in a Miniseries	Top Excellence Award, Actress in a Miniseries
**Park Yoochun** - **Three Days as Han Tae-kyung**; Jo In-sung - It's Okay, That's Love as Jang Jae-yeol; Cho Seung-woo - God's Gift: 14 Days as Ki Dong-chan; Jung Ji-hoon (Rain) - My Lovely Girl as Lee Hyun-wook	**Gong Hyo-jin** - **It's Okay, That's Love as Ji Hae-soo**; Lee Bo-young - God's Gift: 14 Days as Kim Soo-hyun; Park Ha-sun - Three Days as Yoon Bo-won
Top Excellence Award, Actor in a Mid-length Drama	Top Excellence Award, Actress in a Mid-length Drama
**Kim Soo-hyun** - **My Love from the Star as Do Min-joon**; Cha Seung-won - You're All Surrounded as Seo Pan-seok; Kwon Sang-woo - Temptation as Cha Seok-hoon; Lee Jong-suk - Pinocchio as Choi Dal-po/Ki Ha-myung; Lee Seung-gi - You're All Surrounded as Eun Dae-gu/Kim Ji-yong	**Park Shin-hye** - **Pinocchio as Choi In-ha**; Choi Ji-woo - Temptation as Yoo Se-young; Han Hye-jin - One Warm Word as Na Eun-jin; Jun Ji-hyun - My Love from the Star as Cheon Song-yi; Kim Ji-soo - One Warm Word as Song Mi-kyung
Top Excellence Award, Actor in a Serial Drama	Top Excellence Award, Actress in a Serial Drama
**Lee Je-hoon** - **Secret Door as Yi Sun**; Han Suk-kyu - Secret Door as King Yeongjo; Lee Sang-woo - Glorious Day as Seo Jae-woo; Ryu Soo-young - Endless Love as Han Gwang-hoon	**Hwang Jung-eum** - **Endless Love as Seo In-ae**; Lee Ji-ah - Thrice Married Woman as Oh Eun-soo; Park Se-young - Glorious Day as Jung Da-jung; Uhm Ji-won - Thrice Married Woman as Oh Hyun-soo
Excellence Award, Actor in a Miniseries	Excellence Award, Actress in a Miniseries
**Sung Dong-il** - **It's Okay, That's Love as Jo Dong-min**; Jung Gyu-woon - God's Gift: 14 Days as Hyun Woo-jin; Kim Tae-woo - God's Gift: 14 Days as Han Ji-hoon; Son Hyun-joo - Three Days as Lee Dong-hwi	**So Yi-hyun** - **Three Days as Lee Cha-young**; Cha Ye-ryun - My Lovely Girl as Shin Hae-yoon; Krystal Jung - My Lovely Girl as Yoon Se-na
Excellence Award, Actor in a Mid-length Drama	Excellence Award, Actress in a Mid-length Drama
**Shin Sung-rok** - **My Love from the Star as Lee Jae-kyung**; Ji Jin-hee - One Warm Word as Yoo Jae-hak; Joo Sang-wook - Birth of a Beauty as Han Tae-hee; Lee Jung-jin - Temptation as Kang Min-woo; Lee Sang-yoon - Angel Eyes as Park Dong-joo; Park Hae-jin - My Love from the Star as Lee Hwi-kyung	**Han Ye-seul** - **Birth of a Beauty as Sa Geum-ran/Sara**; Go Ara - You're All Surrounded as Eo Soo-sun; Jin Se-yeon - Doctor Stranger as Song Jae-hee/Han Seung-hee; Kang So-ra - Doctor Stranger as Oh Soo-hyun; Ku Hye-sun - Angel Eyes as Yoon Soo-wan; Lee Ha-nui - Modern Farmer as Kang Yoon-hee
Excellence Award, Actor in a Serial Drama	Excellence Award, Actress in a Serial Drama
**Song Chang-eui** - **Thrice Married Woman as Jung Tae-won**; Ha Seok-jin - Thrice Married Woman as Kim Joon-goo; Jung Kyung-ho - Endless Love as Han Gwang-cheol; Kang Seong-min - Cheongdam-dong Scandal as Bok Soo-ho; Lee Tae-gon - One Well-Raised Daughter as Han Yoon-chan	**Choi Jung-yoon** - **Cheongdam-dong Scandal as Eun Hyun-soo**; Lee Min-young - You're Only Mine as Go Eun-jung; Lim Seong-eon - Cheongdam-dong Scandal as Lee Jae-ni; Park Han-byul - One Well-Raised Daughter as Jang Ha-na/Jang Eun-seong; Seo Hyo-rim - Endless Love as Cheon Hye-jin
Special Award, Actor in a Miniseries	Special Award, Actress in a Miniseries
**Lee Kwang-soo** - **It's Okay, That's Love as Park Soo-kwang**; Jang Hyun-sung - Three Days as Ham Bong-su; Park Yeong-gyu - My Lovely Girl as Lee Jong-ho; Shin Goo - God's Gift: 14 Days as Choo Byeong-woo	**Jin Kyung** - **It's Okay, That's Love as Lee Young-jin** / **Pinocchio as Song Cha-ok**; Cha Hwa-yeon - It's Okay, That's Love as Ok-ja; Kim Hye-eun - My Lovely Girl as Oh Hee-seon; Jung Hye-sun - God's Gift: 14 Days as Lee Soon-nyeo
Special Award, Actor in a Mid-length Drama	Special Award, Actress in a Mid-length Drama
**Kim Chang-wan** - **My Love from the Star as Jang Young-mok**; Han Sang-jin - Birth of a Beauty as Han Min-hyeok; Kim Ji-seok - Angel Eyes as Kang Ji-woon; Sung Ji-ru - You're All Surrounded as Lee Eung-do	**Go Doo-shim** - **One Warm Word as Kim Na-ra**; Lee Il-hwa - Modern Farmer as Yoon Hye-jung; Na Young-hee - My Love from the Star as Yang Mi-yeon; Oh Yoon-ah - You're All Surrounded as Kim Sa-kyung
Special Award, Actor in a Serial Drama	Special Award, Actress in a Serial Drama
**Jung Woong-in** - **Endless Love as Park Young-tae**; Cha In-pyo - Endless Love as Cheon Tae-woong; Choi Won-young - Secret Door as Chae Je-gong; Kang Seok-woo - Glorious Day as Seo Min-sik	**Kim Hye-sun** - **Cheongdam-dong Scandal as Kang Bok-hee**; Kim Mi-sook - Glorious Day as Han Song-jung; Shim Hye-jin - Endless Love as Min Hye-rin; Yoon Yoo-sun - One Well-Raised Daughter as Joo Hyo-sun
Special Award, Actor in a Drama Short	Special Award, Actress in a Drama Short
**Lee Deok-hwa** - **Wonderful Day in October as Lee Shin-jae**	**Oh Hyun-kyung** - **A Mother's Choice as Jin So-young**
Netizen Popularity Award	Best Couple
**Kim Soo-hyun** - **My Love from the Star**; Cha Seung-won - You're All Surrounded; Cho Seung-woo - God's Gift: 14 Days; Choi Ji-woo - Temptation; Go Ara - You're All Surrounded; Gong Hyo-jin - It's Okay, That's Love; Han Ye-seul - Birth of a Beauty; Hwang Jung-eum - Endless Love; Jung Ji-hoon (Rain) - My Lovely Girl; Park Yoochun - Three Days; Jo In-sung - It's Okay, That's Love; Joo Sang-wook - Birth of a Beauty; Jun Ji-hyun - My Love from the Star; Kwon Sang-woo - Temptation; Lee Bo-young - God's Gift: 14 Days; Lee Je-hoon - Secret Door; Lee Jong-suk - Pinocchio, Doctor Stranger; Lee Seung-gi - You're All Surrounded; Park Hae-jin - My Love from the Star, Doctor Stranger; Park Shin-hye - Pinocchio; Park Yoochun - Three Days	**Jo In-sung** and **Gong Hyo-jin** - **It's Okay, That's Love**; **Joo Sang-wook** and **Han Ye-seul** - **Birth of a Beauty**; **Kim Soo-hyun** and **Jun Ji-hyun** - **My Love from the Star**; **Lee Jong-suk** and **Park Shin-hye** - **Pinocchio**; Cho Seung-woo and Lee Bo-young - God's Gift: 14 Days; Jung Ji-hoon (Rain) and Krystal Jung - My Lovely Girl; Kwon Sang-woo and Choi Ji-woo - Temptation; Lee Je-hoon and Park Eun-bin - Secret Door; Lee Sang-yoon and Ku Hye-sun - Angel Eyes; Lee Seung-gi and Go Ara - You're All Surrounded; Park Seo-joon and Han Groo - One Warm Word; Park Yoochun and Park Ha-sun - Three Days
Producer's Award	Lifetime Achievement Award
**Jun Ji-hyun** - **My Love from the Star**	**Kim Ja-ok** (posthumously accepted by her son)

=== Top 10 Stars ===
- Han Ye-seul - Birth of a Beauty
- Hwang Jung-eum - Endless Love
- Park Yoochun - Three Days
- Jo In-sung - It's Okay, That's Love
- Joo Sang-wook - Birth of a Beauty
- Jun Ji-hyun - My Love from the Star
- Kim Soo-hyun - My Love from the Star
- Lee Je-hoon - Secret Door
- Lee Jong-suk - Pinocchio, Doctor Stranger
- Park Shin-hye - Pinocchio

=== New Star Award ===
- Ahn Jae-hyun - My Love from the Star
- Han Groo - One Warm Word
- Han Sun-hwa - God's Gift: 14 Days
- Kang Ha-neul - Angel Eyes
- Kim Yoo-jung - Secret Door
- Kim Young-kwang - Pinocchio
- Lee Yu-bi - Pinocchio
- Nam Bo-ra - Only Love
- Park Seo-joon - One Warm Word
- Seo Ha-joon - Only Love
