= Angel's Choice =

South Korean television series

- Also known as: An Angel's Choice
- Hangul: 천사의 선택
- RR: Cheonsaui seontaek
- MR: Ch'ŏnsaŭi sŏnt'aek
- Genre: Melodrama; Romance; Family
- Written by: Seo Hyun-joo
- Directed by: Son Hyung-suk; Jang Ui-soon
- Starring: Choi Jung-yoon; Yoon Hee-seok; Jung Sung-woon; Go Na-eun
- Country of origin: South Korea
- Original language: Korean
- No. of episodes: 140

Production
- Producer: Choi Chang-wook
- Running time: 40 minutes
- Production company: MBC C&I

Original release
- Network: MBC TV
- Release: April 2 – October 12, 2012

Angel's Choice (Korean: 천사의 선택; RR: Cheonsaui seontaek) is a 2012 South Korean television series starring Choi Jung-yoon, Yoon Hee-seok, Jung Sung-woon and Go Na-eun. The morning soap opera aired on MBC from April 2 to October 12, 2012, on Mondays to Fridays at 07:50 (KST) for 140 episodes. The series ended its run with a 15,3% nationwide viewership rating.

== Plot ==
Choi Eun-seol, who lost her parents in an unfortunate accident as a child, grows up in an orphanage and dreams of becoming a doctor. She had a friend, Kang Yu-rang, who always believed in and supported her. Eun-seol tries to achieve her dream even in a difficult environment, and eventually becomes a doctor and starts helping people.

However, Eun-seol's life becomes more complicated when she becomes entangled with her half-sister, Choi Eun-soo. Eun-soo is raised in a wealthy family and leads a different life, unlike Eun-seol. Their relationship greatly affects each other's lives and goes through a process of conflict and reconciliation.

Meanwhile, Kang Yu-rang retains her unwavering love for Eun-seol, but her relationship with Eun-seol is shaken by the emergence of Shin Hyun-seo. Hyun-seo loves wandering, but she suffers when she finds it difficult to achieve it.

== Cast ==
=== Main ===
- Choi Jung-yoon as Choi Eun-seol
- Yoon Hee-seok as Park Sang-ho
- Jung Sung-woon as Wang Min-jae / Kang Min-jae
- Go Na-eun as Kang Yoo-ran / Kang Min-soo

=== Supporting ===
==== Choi Eun-seol's family ====
- Choi Il-hwa as Choi Ji-hak
- Jang Hee-soo as Jang Soon-ok
- Chu Hun-yub as Choi Eun-suk

==== Wang Min-jae's family ====
- Lee Jung-gil as Wang Gook-hyun
- Oh Mi-yeon as Han Pil-nyeo

==== Park Sang-ho's family ====
- Heo Yoon-jung as Heo Young-ja
- Kang Ye-seo as Yoo-ran and Sang-ho's daughter

==== Kang Yoo-ran's family ====
- Kim Dong-joo as Yang Mal-soon
- Jung Soo-young as Kang Yoo-mi

==== Extended cast ====
- Kim Min-jwa as Oh Soo-jung
- Seo Bum-suk as Bae Dal-bong
- Yang Jae-sung as Chairman Oh
- Choi Jung-hwa as Lee Jung-ah
- Kwon Sung-hyun as Lee Myung-jin, an attorney
- Kang Chul-sung as Secretary Kim
