= Ryu Soo-young =

South Korean actor (born 1979)

Ryu Su-young
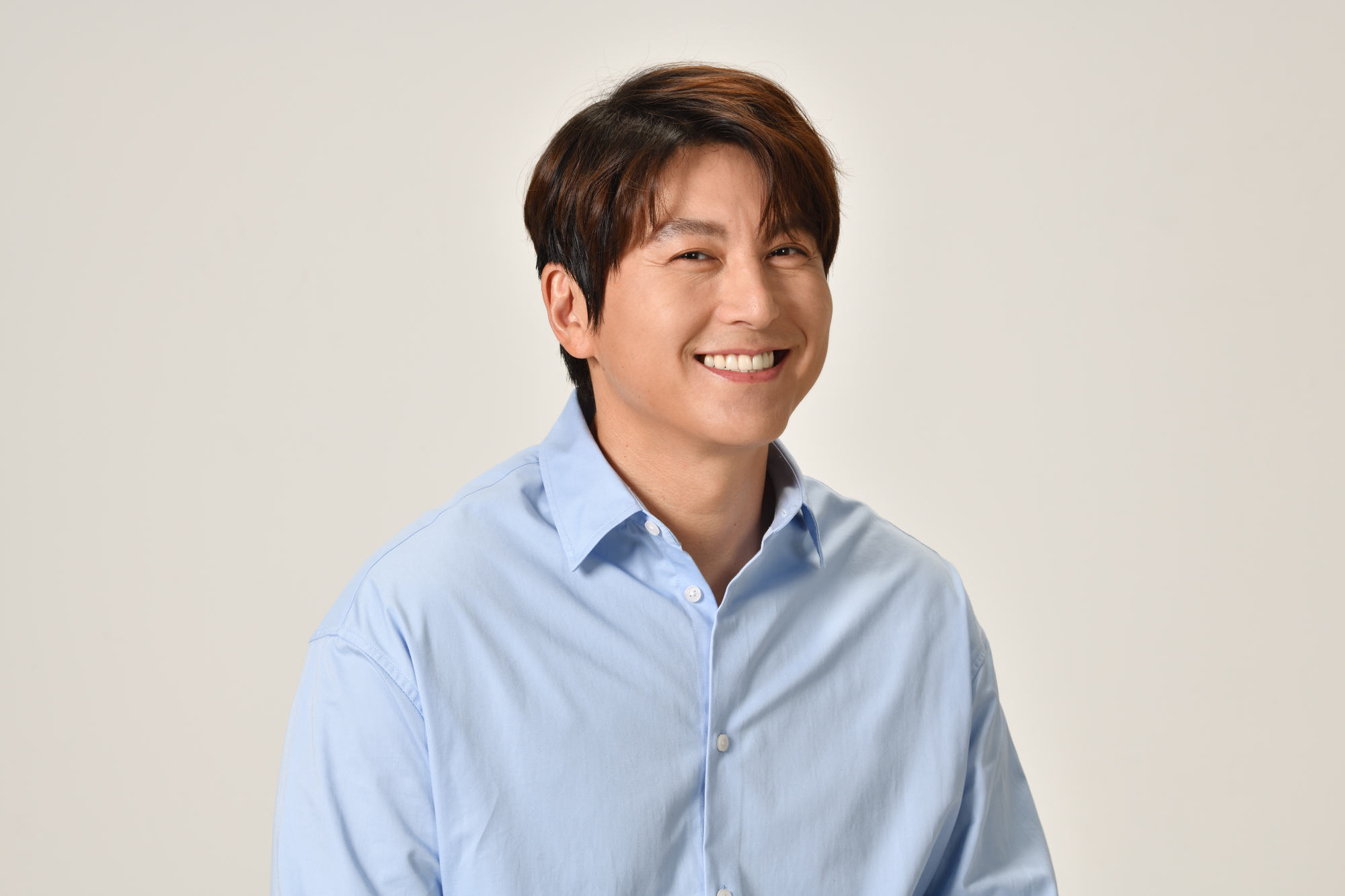
- Ryu in 2019
- Born: Eo Nam-sun; September 5, 1979 (age 47); Seoul, South Korea
- Education: Myongji University - Business Administration
- Occupations: Actor; chef
- Years active: 1998–present
- Agent: ELRIS
- Spouse: Park Ha-sun (m. 2017)
- Children: 1

Korean name
- Hangul: 어남선
- RR: Eo Namseon
- MR: Ŏ Namsŏn

Stage name
- Hangul: 류수영
- RR: Ryu Suyeong
- MR: Ryu Suyŏng

Ryu Su-young (Korean: 류수영; born September 5, 1979), birth name Eo Nam-seon (어남선) is a South Korean actor and chef. He made his first appearance on television as a college student on a cooking show in 1998, then starred in the controversial film Summertime (2001). This was followed by supporting roles in TV dramas such as Successful Story of a Bright Girl (2002), Save the Last Dance for Me (2004), and Lawyers of the Great Republic Korea (2008), as well as leading roles in 18 vs. 29 (2005), Seoul 1945 (2006), and Bad Couple (2007).

For his mandatory military service, Ryu was a member of the Seoul Metropolitan Police Agency from 2008 to 2010. After his discharge, Ryu returned to television in 2011 in the romantic comedy My Princess, and the popular family drama Ojakgyo Family. In 2013, he joined the reality/variety show Real Men, in which male celebrities visit army bases and experience daily life there. He also played a detective chasing a fugitive in Two Weeks (2013).

== Personal life ==
=== Marriage and family ===
Ryu Soo-young married his fellow actress, Park Ha-sun, in a private ceremony at the Mayfield Hotel in Seoul on January 22, 2017. Their romantic relationship started in 2014. They also worked together in the television drama Two Weeks (2013).

They welcomed their first child, a daughter, in August 2017.

=== Philanthropy ===
On March 15, 2022, Ryu made a donation ₩100 million to the Hope Bridge Disaster Relief Association along with Park Ha-sun to help those who have been damaged by the massive wildfire that started in Uljin, Gyeongbuk and has continued to spread. Samcheok, Gangwon.

== Filmography ==
=== Film ===
Year	Title	Role	Notes	Ref.
2001	Summertime	Jin-woo/Sang-ho		
2002	Mirror		short film	
2003	Blue	Sergeant Lee Kyeong-il		
2013	The Attorney	Lee Chang-joon	Cameo	
2019	Chateau Monte	Jeong-hyun		
2020	Steel Rain 2: Summit	Captain Baek Doo-ho		
2023	My Heart Puppy	a father	Cameo	

=== Television series ===
Year	Title	Role	Notes	Ref.
2000	Gibbs' Family	resident 2		
2000	Love and Farewell			
2001	Open Drama Man and Woman – "An Ecstatic Outing"	Jung-woo		
2001	Good Friends 2	radio AD		
2001	Navy	Jung Hyun-soo		
2002	Open Drama Man and Woman – "Green Card"			
2002	Successful Story of a Bright Girl	Oh Joon-tae		
2002	Affection	Jae-man		
2002	Open Drama Man and Woman: "Accident"			
2002	The Maengs' Golden Era	Yoo Jung-jae		
2003	First Love	Hwang Hyung-joon		
2003	Merry Go Round	Jeon Soo-hyung		
2003	New Gyun-woo and Jik-nyeo	Shin Tae-young		
2004	Jang Gil-san	Lee Ji-yong		
2004	MBC Best Theater – "Butterfly"	Yoo Hyun-soo	one act-drama	
2004	Save the Last Dance for Me	Jung Tae-min		
2005	Eighteen, Twenty-Nine	Kang Sang-young		
2005	Rebirth - Next	Min Ki-beom		
2006	Seoul 1945	Choi Woon-hyuk		
2007	Bad Couple	Choi Gi-chan		
2008	Lawyers of the Great Republic of Korea	Byun Hyuk		
2011	My Princess	Nam Jung-woo		
2011	Ojakgyo Family	Hwang Tae-beom		
2012	The Sons	Yoo Min-ki		
2013	KBS Drama Special: "The Memory in My Old Wallet"	Lee Young-jae	one act-drama	
2013	Two Weeks	Im Seung-woo		
2014	Endless Love	Han Gwang-hoon		
2015	Blood	Park Hyun-seo		
2015	The Virtual Bride	Cha Myeong-seok		
2016	My Lawyer, Mr. Jo	Shin Ji-wook		
2017	My Father Is Strange	Cha Jung-Hwan		
2018	Nice Witch	Song Woo-jin		
2019	Love in Sadness	Kang In-wook		
2021	Here's My Plan	Lee Jae-young	Shorts drama	
2023	Twinkling Watermelon	adult Lee Si-guk (2023)	Cameo (episode 16)	

=== Web series ===
Year	Title	Role	Ref.
2023	Queenmaker	Baek Jae-min	
2023–2026	Bloodhounds	Doo-young	

=== Television shows ===
Year	Title	Role	Notes	Ref.
2001	Hey! At Midnight	MC		
2013–2014	Real Men	Cast Member		
2018	Big Picture Family	Cast Member		
2018	Let's Go, Let's Go	Cast Member		
2020	Perfect Life	MC		
2020–present	Stars' Top Recipe at Fun-Staurant	Cast Member		
2021	Fantasy House	MC		
2021	Ryu Soo-young's Animal TV	MC		
2021	Warning of the Earth - Carbon 2 Trilogy	Narrator	The End of Carbon Civilization	
2022	Deokjeok High School Baseball Club	Narrator	Documentary Insight	
2023	Green Father	Cast Member		
2025	Foreign Student Ryu Nam-saeng	Cast Member		

=== Web shows ===
Year	Title	Role	Notes	Ref.
2022	K Food Show	Cast Member	with Huh Young-man and Ham Yeon-ji	

=== Radio shows ===
Year	Title	Role	Notes	Ref.
2021	Park Ha-sun's Cinetown	Special DJ	October 19, October 25–26	
2022	Park Ha-sun's Cinetown	Special DJ	July 26 – August 5	

=== Music video appearances ===
Year	Song title	Artist
2001	"Sorrow"	NRG

== Stage ==
=== Concert ===
Musical play performances
Year	Title		Role	Theater	Date	Ref.
Year	English	Korean	Role	Theater	Date	Ref.
2022	Masterpiece with 4 organs	4대의 오르간으로 만나는 명작	MC	IBK Chamber Hall, Sejong Center for the Performing Arts	October 18, 2018	

=== Musical ===
Musical play performances
Year	Title		Role	Theater	Date	Ref.
Year	English	Korean	Role	Theater	Date	Ref.
2013–2014	The Lady and the Hooligans	아가씨와 건달들	Sky	Kwanglim Art Center BBCH Hall	November 1, 2013 – January 5, 2014	
2014	The Lady and the Hooligans	아가씨와 건달들	Sky	GS Caltex Yeoulmaru Main Theater	February 14–16, 2014	
2014	The Lady and the Hooligans	아가씨와 건달들	Sky	Busan City Hall Main Theater	February 21–23, 2014	
2014	The Lady and the Hooligans	아가씨와 건달들	Sky	Namhansanseong Art Hall Main Theater	March 21–22, 2014	

== Accolades ==
=== Awards and nominations ===
Name of the award ceremony, year presented, category, nominee of the award, and the result of the nomination
Award ceremony	Year	Category	Nominee / Work	Result	Ref.
Baeksang Arts Awards	2007	Best Actor – Television	Seoul 1945	Nominated	
Baeksang Arts Awards	2021	Best New Actor – Film	Steel Rain 2: Summit	Nominated	
Chunsa Film Art Awards	2021	Best Supporting Actor	Steel Rain 2: Summit	Nominated	
KBS Drama Awards	2006	Top Excellence Award, Actor	Seoul 1945	Won	
KBS Drama Awards	2011	Best Couple Award with Choi Jung-yoon	Ojakgyo Family	Won	
KBS Drama Awards	2011	Excellence Award, Actor in a Serial Drama	Ojakgyo Family	Nominated	
KBS Drama Awards	2013	Excellence Award, Actor in a One-Act/Special/Short Drama	The Memory in My Old Wallet	Nominated	
KBS Drama Awards	2017	Best Couple Award with Lee Yoo-ri	Father is Strange	Won	
KBS Drama Awards	2017	Excellence Award, Actor in a Serial Drama	Father is Strange	Nominated	
KBS Entertainment Awards	2020	Best Entertainer Award in Reality Category	Stars' Top Recipe at Fun-Staurant	Won	
KBS Entertainment Awards	2020	Rookie Award in Reality Category	Stars' Top Recipe at Fun-Staurant	Nominated	
KBS Entertainment Awards	2021	Popularity Award	Stars' Top Recipe at Fun-Staurant	Won	
KBS Entertainment Awards	2021	Top Excellence Award in Reality Category	Stars' Top Recipe at Fun-Staurant	Nominated	
KBS Entertainment Awards	2022	Top Excellence Award in Show and Variety Category	Stars' Top Recipe at Fun-Staurant	Won	
KBS Entertainment Awards	2023	Entertainer of the Year	Stars' Top Recipe at Fun-Staurant	Won	
KBS Entertainment Awards	2023	Grand Prize	Stars' Top Recipe at Fun-Staurant	Nominated	
Korea Drama Awards	2018	Excellence Award, Actor	Nice Witch	Nominated	
MBC Drama Awards	2005	Excellence Award, Actor	Rebirth - Next	Nominated	
MBC Drama Awards	2012	Excellence Award, Actor in a Serial Drama	The Sons	Nominated	
MBC Drama Awards	2019	Excellence Award, Actor in a Weekend/Daily Drama	Love in Sadness	Won	
MBC Entertainment Awards	2013	Star of the Year	Real Men	Won	
SBS Drama Awards	2002	New Star Award	Successful Story of a Bright Girl	Won	
SBS Drama Awards	2004	Best Supporting Actor	Save the Last Dance for Me	Won	
SBS Drama Awards	2007	Excellence Award, Actor in a Miniseries	Bad Couple	Nominated	
SBS Drama Awards	2014	Top Excellence Award, Actor in a Serial Drama	Endless Love	Nominated	
SBS Drama Awards	2018	Top Excellence Award, Actor in a Daily and Weekend Drama	Nice Witch	Nominated	
SBS Entertainment Awards	2024	Top Excellence Award, Male	Jungle Bob	Won	

=== State honors ===
Name of country, year given, and name of honor
Country or Organization	Year	Honor or Award	Ref.
South Korea (Note: Honors are given at the Korean Popular Culture and Arts Awards, arranged by the Korea Creative Content Agency and hosted by the Ministry of Culture, Sports and Tourism. They are awarded to those who have contributed to the arts and South Korea's pop culture.)	2020	Minister of Culture, Sports and Tourism Commendation	
