= Scandal Maker =

- Poster
- Chinese: 外公芳齡 38
- Directed by: Ahn Byeong-ki
- Screenplay by: Tristan Jian
- Based on: Scandal Makers
- Produced by: Liu Wenpu; Jie Chen; Rong Rong; Eline Zhu; Gary Cheng; Wayne Wei Jiang; Li Jing; Li Liangwen; Zhang Li; Wu Doinel; Xiang Yue
- Starring: Tong Dawei; Michelle Chen
- Cinematography: Lee Sung-jae
- Edited by: Wang Gang
- Music by: Ji Yuan; Nana Wang
- Distributed by: Wuzhou Film Distribution; Gravity Pictures Investment; Meiya Great Wall Media (Beijing); Huaxia Film Distribution; Wanda Pictures (Qingdao)
- Release date: 11 November 2016
- Running time: 103 minutes
- Country: Taiwan
- Language: Mandarin
- Box office: CN¥44.6 million

Scandal Maker is a 2016 Taiwanese comedy-drama film directed by Ahn Byeong-ki, starring Tong Dawei and Michelle Chen and a remake of the 2008 South Korean film Scandal Makers. It was released in China on November 11, 2016.

== Cast ==
- Tong Dawei
- Michelle Chen
- Lü Yuncong
- Liu Ruilin
- Wen Xin
- Pan Bin-long
- Li Xiaochuan
- Zhao Longhao
- Peng Ziheng
- Zhang Youhao
- Li Weijian
- Li Yu
- Li Jing
- Teng Fei
- Xu Jingying

== Reception ==
The film grossed US$5.2 million on its opening weekend in China.
