= Kim Hye-sun =

South Korean actress (born 1969)

- Born: September 28, 1969 (age 57); Jung District, Seoul, South Korea
- Other name: Shirakawa Shoko
- Education: Dankook University (Cheonan) - Theater and film
- Occupation: Actress
- Years active: 1986–present
- Agent: Run Entertainment

Korean name
- Hangul: 김혜선
- Hanja: 金惠仙
- RR: Gim Hyeseon
- MR: Kim Hyesŏn

Kim Hye-sun (Korean: 김혜선; born September 28, 1969) is a South Korean actress. She is best known for her leading role in the television drama First Wives' Club (2007–2008).

== Career ==
Kim Hye-sun began modeling when she was in middle school. While attending Anyang High School of the Arts, Kim appeared in commercials for Orion, Lotte Samkang and Korea Cosmetics, and subsequently made her acting debut in 1986. She quickly gained popularity as a teen star with an innocent and bright image. Kim also became active in Japanese entertainment in 1988, where she was known under the name Shirakawa Shoko (白川翔子) and released two photo books titled Temptation of the White Wind and Like It!. In 1993, she won Best Supporting Actress at the Blue Dragon Film Awards for her performance in Love Is Oh Yeah!.

After getting married in 1995, Kim retired from show business and immigrated to the United States. But she returned to acting two years later in the television drama The River of Maternal Love (1997). As she grew older, she began playing ajummas (middle-aged wives and mothers), notably in Famous Princesses (2006), First Wives' Club (2007) and What's for Dinner? (2009). Then in 2011, Kim was cast in her first big-screen leading role in 17 years. In My Secret Partner, she played a famous chef in her 40s who becomes involved in a passionate romance with a younger man in his 20s, and the film became controversial due to its explicit content, which featured Kim in a number of nude scenes.

== Personal life ==
Kim married her first husband in 1995, but after eight years of marriage, they divorced in September 2003. She remarried in July 2004, but she and her second husband, a businessman, divorced in 2009. Kim has two children, a son and a daughter.

== Filmography ==
=== Film ===
Year	Title	Role	Notes/Ref.
1986	Dancing Daughter		
1987	A Woman Beating the Drum		
1988	If You Want	Ki-yeon	
1989	Memories of Balbari	Mi-na	
1991	The Submarine with a Rabbit Aboard	Kim Mi-ah	
1992	A Bloody Battle for Revenge	In-hye	
1992	Sons and Lovers	Ga-hee	
1993	Hwa-Om-Kyung	I-ryeon	
1993	Love Is Oh Yeah!	Teacher Choi	
1994	The Man Who Cannot Kiss	Do Do-hye	
1996	Piano Man	—N/a	Producer
2006	Dark Forest	Kim Sun-a	Cameo
2011	My Secret Partner	Hee-sook	
2022	Jajangmyeon Thank you		Shorts Film; special appearance
TBA	My Girl's Choice		American Film

=== Television series ===
Year	Title	Role
1987	Blue Classroom	
1987	A Tree Blooming with Love	
1988	500 Years of Joseon: The Memoirs of Lady Hyegyŏng	Moon Suk-ui
1989	A Happy Woman	Yeo-kyung
1990	Pacheonmu	Seol-ri, Kim Jong-seo's concubine
1991	Autumn Flowers in Winter Trees	
1991	Another's Happiness	Cha Moon-hee
1991	Mudong's House	Chae-kyung
1991	Asphalt My Hometown	Ki-joo
1992	Rose Garden	Hye-ran
1992	Gwanchon Essay	
1993	Walking All the Way to Heaven	Im Ji-sook
1993	To the Lovely Others	Ha Soon-nam, tearoom madam
1993	To Live	Sook-pyo
1994	The Land of People	Jang Ji-ae
1994	I Want to Be Happy	Cha Eun-hee
1995	What Happened At Sunrise	Mi-ran
1997	The River of Maternal Love	Seo Myung-joo
1997	Three Kim Generation	Yoon Hye-ra
1998	A Whistling Sound	Twin sisters
1998	MBC Best Theater "Searching for the Hidden Face"	
1998	Sunday Best "Short Memories of Love"	
1998	I Hate You, But It's Fine	Ha-na
1998	For Love	Kang Sun-kyung
1999	MBC Best Theater "The Technicalities of Divorce"	Sook-mi
1999	You	Yoo Soon-ye
1999	MBC Best Theater "My First Boyfriend, Mom's Last Lover"	Eun-ji's mother
1999	Michiko	
1999	Woman on Top	Soon-nam
1999	Hur Jun	Jan Geum-yi's mother
2000	Foolish Princes	Joo Sun-mi
2001	Empress Myeongseong	Chuseon
2001	Father and Son	
2002	Ruler of Your Own World	Jeon Kang's wife
2002	Remember	Choi Mi-ran
2002	The Maengs' Golden Era	Yoo Jung-hwa
2002	Girl's High School	Seo Min-jung
2003	Ang-sook	Yeon-hee
2003	Jewel in the Palace	Park Myeong-yi
2004	Match Made in Heaven	Kim Seok-gu's older sister
2004	Terms of Endearment	Mi-seon, Kang Geum-pa's friend
2004	Lotus Flower Fairy	Bu Yong-hwa
2004	Toji, the Land	Gong Wol-seon
2005	Tears of Diamond	Eun Ae-ryung
2006	Famous Princesses	Na Deok-chil
2007	First Wives' Club	Han Bok-soo
2008	My Pitiful Sister	Song Jae-jeong
2009	What's for Dinner?	Jo Young-shim
2010	Dong Yi	Court lady Jung
2010	Master of Prescriptions	
2011	New Tales of Gisaeng	Han Soon-deok
2011	Gyebaek	Eul-nyeo (cameo)
2011	The Great Gift	Hyeong-soo
2011	If Tomorrow Comes	Kim Soon-jung
2012	The King's Doctor	Queen Inseon
2012	Cheer Up, Mr. Kim!	Hong Hae-sook
2013	Eunhui	Han Jung-ok
2013	Love in Her Bag	Woo Do-young
2013	Melody of Love	Yoon Ji-young
2014	Cheongdam-dong Scandal	Kang Bok-hee
2015	My Unfortunate Boyfriend	Yoo Ji-na's mother
2016–2017	Our Gap-soon	Yeo Shi-nae
2021	Revolutionary Sisters	Oh Taeng-ja
2024	Beauty and Mr. Romantic	Hong Ae-kyo

== Awards and nominations ==
Year	Award	Category	Nominated work	Result
1990	MBC Drama Awards	Best New Actress		Won
1993	14th Blue Dragon Film Awards	Best Supporting Actress	Love Is Oh Yeah!	Won
1993	SBS Drama Awards	Excellence Award, Actress		Won
1999	KBS Drama Awards	Excellence Award, Actress		Won
2008	9th Korea Visual Arts Festival	Photogenic Award, TV Actress category	First Wives' Club	Won
2008	SBS Drama Awards	Excellence Award, Actress in a Serial Drama	First Wives' Club	Won
2011	SBS Drama Awards	Special Award, Actress in a Weekend/Daily Drama	New Tales of Gisaeng	Nominated
2012	MBC Drama Awards	Excellence Award, Actress in a Special Project Drama	The King's Doctor	Nominated
2013	21st Korean Culture and Entertainment Awards	Excellence Award, Actress (TV)	Melody of Love	Won
2013	KBS Drama Awards	Excellence Award, Actress in a Daily Drama	Eunhui, Melody of Love	Nominated
2014	SBS Drama Awards	Special Award, Actress in a Serial Drama	Cheongdam-dong Scandal	Won
2018	MBC Drama Awards	Excellence Award, Actress in a Soap Opera	Secrets and Lies	Nominated
