= Summertime (2001 film) =

2001 film by Park Jae-ho

- Film poster
- Hangul: 썸머타임
- RR: Sseommeotaim
- MR: Ssŏmmŏt'aim
- Directed by: Park Jae-ho
- Written by: Yu Gap-yeol
- Based on: Scorpio Nights by Peque Gallaga
- Produced by: Cha Seung-jae
- Starring: Ryu Soo-young; Kim Ji-hyun
- Cinematography: Shin Hyun-joong
- Edited by: Park Soon-duk
- Music by: Um In-ho
- Production companies: Barunson E&A; Sidus Pictures
- Distributed by: Cinema Service
- Release date: May 26, 2001
- Running time: 103 minutes
- Country: South Korea
- Language: Korean

Summertime (Korean: 썸머타임; RR: Sseommeotaim) is a 2001 South Korean drama film directed by Park Jae-ho and starring Ryu Soo-young and Kim Ji-hyun. A remake of the controversial Philippine film Scorpio Nights (1985), the film was also inspired by the Gwangju massacre.

== Plot ==
Set in the 1980s, Sang-ho is a student activist hiding out in a small rural village. He accidentally witnesses, through a hole on the floor of his second story room, a married couple having sex. He discovers he is a voyeur at heart and becomes bolder and bolder in his actions. One day, he gets an opportunity to play out his fantasies. When the husband is not home, Sang-ho goes downstairs. Imitating the husband's manner of foreplay even down to the sequence, the young man has sex with the wife. She, like Sang-ho, is a prisoner of the house. The second time he comes to her, he touches her in a different way which makes her turn around and discover that there is a stranger in her bed. But this does not deter her as she reaches out to him for an intense embrace. The husband, Tae-yeol, is an ex-policeman fired for alleged corruption, and his wife Hee-ran, who was raped by him as a young girl, for the sake of status quo has ended up as his wife and prisoner.

== Cast ==
- Ryu Soo-young as Sang-ho
- Kim Ji-hyun as Hee-ran
- Choi Cheol-ho as Tae-yeol
- Song Ok-sook as Gi-ok
- Bae Jeong-yun as Young-mi
- Choi Seong-min
- Yun Yeong-keol
- Jang Seong-won
- Kim Seon-hwa
- Lee Seung-hun
- Ahn Byeong-kyeong
- Park Hoon-jung as child in the playground

== Casting and production ==
Initially, an audition was held to cast the female lead, and a friend of Kim Ji-hyun's brother heard about it. The friend recommended Kim for the role over the phone, and she was given the script for the movie. Receiving the script, Kim was resistant to its explicit content, but she was touched by the storyline and accepted the role. In preparation for the role, she viewed erotic films such as Last Tango in Paris and In the Realm of the Senses, and read news articles and books from and depicting the 1980s, the time period the film was set in. Ryu Soo-young, the film's male lead, was also a first-time movie actor, though he had experience appearing in TV dramas. He chose to star in Summertime because his manager was close with the film's producer, and at the time staff needed more male actors. Ryu was also reluctant to appear in the film, but he accepted after the director urged him it was not just "people taking off their clothes". For the movie, he took on a strenuous diet consisting of only one meal a day.

Filming took place inside sets in Yangsu-ri, Gyeonggi Province, in November 2000. The actors filmed the majority of erotic scenes without covering their genitals or employing substitute actors. According to Ryu Soo-young in a 2012 episode of Radio Star, the movie's script was substantially cut to fit its run time.
