= Endless Love (2014 TV series) =

2014 South Korean television series

- Genre: Period drama Romance; Melodrama; Crime; Action
- Written by: Na Yeon-sook
- Directed by: Lee Hyun-jik
- Starring: Hwang Jung-eum; Ryu Soo-young; Jung Kyung-ho
- Composer: SBS Content Hub
- Country of origin: South Korea
- Original language: Korean
- No. of episodes: 37

Production
- Executive producer: Kim Young-sub
- Producer: Lee Sang-min
- Production location: Korea
- Running time: 60 minutes
- Production company: Story TV

Original release
- Network: SBS TV
- Release: June 21 – October 26, 2014

Endless Love (Korean: 끝없는 사랑; RR: Kkeudeomneun sarang) is a 2014 South Korean television series directed by Lee Hyun-jik and written by Na Yeon-sook, with an ensemble cast starring Hwang Jung-eum, Ryu Soo-young, and Jung Kyung-ho. It aired on SBS from June 21 to October 26, 2014 on Saturdays and Sundays at 22:00 for 37 episodes.

== Plot ==
A period drama that tells the story of the loves, dreams, and ambitions of a woman who lived from the 1970s to the 1990s, an era of great political and economic upheaval in South Korea.

Seo In-ae is determined to do whatever it takes to avenge her murdered mother. She also faces many trials and tribulations while upholding justice and the law in her profession, where she meets important government and military figures. Brothers Han Gwang-hoon and Han Gwang-cheol were her childhood friends. In-ae and Gwang-hoon loved each other, but their ambitions and conflict of interests marred their relationship. On the other hand, Gwang-cheol has always loved In-ae passionately.

== Cast ==
=== Main characters ===
- Hwang Jung-eum as Seo In-ae
  - Bang Yoo-sul as young In-ae

She witnessed the murder of her mother as a child. She grows up as a smart, beautiful, and ambitious woman who wants to help people seeking justice, while hoping that someday she can avenge her mother. She knows how to persuade people. After a stint in juvenile detention she is discovered by a famous film director and becomes an actress for a brief period. She is later imprisoned and tortured, then passes the bar exam to become a human rights lawyer.

- Ryu Soo-young as Han Gwang-hoon
  - Choi Ha-ho as young Gwang-hoon

Eldest son of a poor fisherman's family. He and Seo In-ae have loved each other since childhood. Cool-headed, charismatic and sometimes shrewd, he is a genius who strives to become a powerful and successful person. Conscripted into the army, he becomes the assisting officer to General Cheon Tae-woong who serves as a father figure and mentor. Gwang-hoon is sent abroad to study in the United States and continues as aide-de-camp to General Cheon who leaves the army to head the National Security department, and later runs for political office.

- Jung Kyung-ho as Han Gwang-cheol
  - Jo Yong-jin as young Gwang-cheol

Han Gwang-hoon's hot-blooded brother. He has one-sided love towards Seo In-ae. She has always been his main driving force in life, to the point that he is determined to be with her until he dies. He likes to fight. In Japan he meets businessman Chairman Son who is the brother of the Prime Minister; subsequently Gwang-cheol becomes manager of Son's hotel in Seoul, and also president of Hanseo Construction which was formed as the family business moved on from fishing to construction.

=== Supporting characters ===
- Cha In-pyo as Cheon Tae-woong, a 3-star General in the Republic of Korea Army
- Jung Woong-in as Park Young-tae, intelligence official and main antagonist, secret lover of Min Hye-rin
- Jung Dong-hwan as Kim Geon-pyo, Prime Minister of South Korea
- Shim Hye-jin as Min Hye-rin, spouse of Kim Geon-pyo, nicknamed the "Iron Butterfly"
- Choi Ji-na as Jin Yang-ja, spouse of Cheon Tae-woong
- Seo Hyo-rim as Cheon Hye-jin, daughter of Cheon Tae-woong, becomes wife of Han Gwang-hoon through an arranged marriage
- Kim Joon as Kim Tae-gyeong, son of Kim Geon-pyo
- Jeon So-min as Kim Sae-gyeong, daughter of Min Hye-rin, has crush on Han Gwang-chul
- Kim Min-young as Hwa-ja
- Shin Eun-jung as Gyeong-ja, Seo In-ae's aunt
- Lee Chung-mi as Hyo-ri
- Choi Sung-kook as Jo Won-gyu, looks after day-to-day operations of Hanseo family business
- Lee Won-jae as Yang San-bak
- Hahm Eun-jung as Tae Cho-ae, heir apparent to a chaebol, proposed arranged marriage spouse for Kim Tae-gyeong
- Shin Rin-ah as Esther
- Lee Yong-yi as Mrs. Ahn

== Awards and nominations ==
| Year | Award | Category | Recipient | Result |
|---|---|---|---|---|
| 2014 | 7th Korea Drama Awards | Top Excellence Award, Actress | Hwang Jung-eum | Nominated |
| 2014 | SBS Drama Awards | Top Excellence Award, Actor in a Serial Drama | Ryu Soo-young | Nominated |
| 2014 | SBS Drama Awards | Top Excellence Award, Actress in a Serial Drama | Hwang Jung-eum | Won |
| 2014 | SBS Drama Awards | Excellence Award, Actor in a Serial Drama | Jung Kyung-ho | Nominated |
| 2014 | SBS Drama Awards | Excellence Award, Actress in a Serial Drama | Seo Hyo-rim | Nominated |
| 2014 | SBS Drama Awards | Special Award, Actor in a Serial Drama | Cha In-pyo | Nominated |
| 2014 | SBS Drama Awards | Special Award, Actor in a Serial Drama | Jung Woong-in | Won |
| 2014 | SBS Drama Awards | Special Award, Actress in a Serial Drama | Shim Hye-jin | Nominated |
| 2014 | SBS Drama Awards | Top 10 Stars | Hwang Jung-eum | Won |
| 2014 | SBS Drama Awards | Netizen Popularity Award | Hwang Jung-eum | Nominated |
