= One Well-Raised Daughter =

- Promotional poster
- Also known as: A Well Grown Daughter; Well Brought-up Daughter, Ha-na; Good Daughter, Hana
- Genre: Romance; Family; Melodrama
- Written by: Yoon Young-mi
- Directed by: Jo Young-kwang
- Starring: Park Han-byul; Lee Tae-gon; Jung Eun-woo; Yoon Se-in
- Country of origin: South Korea
- Original language: Korean
- No. of episodes: 122

Production
- Executive producer: Jo Nam-kook
- Producer: Lee Sang-hoon
- Production location: South Korea
- Running time: Mondays to Fridays at 19:20 (KST)
- Production companies: M&CL

Original release
- Network: Seoul Broadcasting System
- Release: December 2, 2013 – May 30, 2014

One Well-Raised Daughter (Korean: 잘키운 딸 하나; RR: Jalkiun ttal hana) is a 2013 South Korean daily drama starring Park Han-byul, Lee Tae-gon, Jung Eun-woo and Yoon Se-in. It aired on SBS from December 2, 2013 to May 30, 2014 on Mondays to Fridays at 19:20 for 122 episodes.

== Plot ==
The Jang family owns the Hwangso Soy Sauce Factory, which has been making soy sauce for two centuries. When the patriarch's son dies in a train crash, Jang Ha-na, the family's fourth daughter, is chosen to be its next successor. However, because of the tradition of passing the ownership of the company only to a male heir, Ha-na is raised as a boy and must disguise herself as the family son called "Jang Eun-sung" in order to inherit and prevent the factory from being taken over by her mother's scheming rival and her two children as well as a rival competitor.

== Cast ==
=== Main ===
- Park Han-byul as Jang Ha-na/Jang Eun-seong
- Lee Tae-gon as Han Yoon-chan
- Jung Eun-woo as Seol Do-hyun
- Yoon Se-in as Jang Ra-hee

=== Supporting ===
- Yoon Yoo-sun as Joo Hyo-sun
- Ha Jae-sook as Jang Ha-myung
- Park In-hwan as Jang Pan-ro
- Kim Ji-young as Byun Jong-soon
- Lee Hye-sook as Im Chung-ran
- Kim Min-young as Ha-myung
- Kim Joo-young as Jang Ra-kong
- Choi Jae-sung as Seol Jin-mook
- Han Yoo-yi as Seol Do-eun
- Choi Hyo-eun as Shin-hee
- Jo Woo-jin

== Awards and nominations ==
Year	Award	Category	Recipient	Result
2014	7th Korea Drama Awards	Excellence Award, Actress	Park Han-byul	Nominated
2014	22nd SBS Drama Awards	Excellence Award, Actor in a Serial Drama	Lee Tae-gon	Nominated
2014	22nd SBS Drama Awards	Excellence Award, Actress in a Serial Drama	Park Han-byul	Nominated
2014	22nd SBS Drama Awards	Special Award, Actress in a Serial Drama	Yoon Yoo-sun	Nominated
