= Ojakgyo Family =

South Korean television series

- Also known as: Ojakgyo Brothers
- Hangul: 오작교 형제들
- Hanja: 烏鵲橋 兄弟들
- RR: Ojakgyo hyeongjedeul
- MR: Ojakkyo hyŏngjedŭl
- Genre: Comedy; Romance; Family; Drama
- Written by: Lee Jung-sun
- Directed by: Ki Min-soo
- Starring: Uee; Joo Won; Ryu Soo-young; Choi Jung-yoon
- Country of origin: South Korea
- Original language: Korean
- No. of episodes: 58

Production
- Executive producer: Jung Sung-hyo
- Producer: Noh Sang-hoon
- Running time: Saturdays and Sundays at 19:55 (KST)
- Production company: Chorokbaem Media

Original release
- Network: KBS2
- Release: August 6, 2011 – February 19, 2012

Ojakgyo Family (Korean: 오작교 형제들; RR: Ojakgyo hyeongjedeul; lit. 'Ojakgyo Brothers') is a South Korean television series starring Uee, Joo Won, Ryu Soo-young, Choi Jung-yoon, Jung Woong-in, Yeon Woo-jin, Baek Il-seob, and Kim Ja-ok. The family drama aired on KBS2 from August 6, 2011, to February 19, 2012, on Saturdays and Sundays at 19:55 for 58 episodes.

== Plot ==
It is a story about a family consisting of a grandmother, father, mother, and four sons who live in Ojakgyo farm. The father is Hwang Chang-shik and the mother is Park Bok-ja. The oldest son, Hwang Tae-shik, is an almost-40-year-old physical therapist who has a son named Guk-su from a Filipina. At first, Tae-shik is embarrassed to admit Guk-su as his son and tries to hide Guk-su from his family. The second son, Hwang Tae-beom, is a reporter who marries his colleague, the rich Cha Su-yeong after getting her pregnant. Tae-beom has loved another girl, Han Hye-ryeong, but as Hye-ryeong leaves him, Tae-beom marries Su-yeong. His married life is often filled with trivial arguments and problems. The third son, Hwang Tae-hee, is a quiet detective. He is not Chang-shik's real son but he is Chang-shik's nephew. Sometimes, Tae-hee feels left out from his brothers. However, Chang-shik and Bok-ja really love him as a son that Tae-hee also regards them and their real sons as family. The youngest, Hwang Tae-pil, lately works to Su-yeong's aunt in her clothing store.

Then, a rich girl named Baek Ja-eun comes to the Ojakgyo farm and changes the Hwang family's lives. Her father is lost in the sea and her selfish stepmother leaves her after her father is bankrupt. Ja-eun's father is also accused of bribing the university to admit Ja-eun. Discouraged by the situation, Ja-eun finds her father's contract. Actually, Baek In-ho, her father, owns the Ojakgyo farm but he lends the farm to his friend Chang-shik for 10 years. Now after 10 years, Ja-eun determines to regain her rightful land and sell it to get money. Everyone in the Hwang family is unhappy with the news that even Bok-ja stole Ja-eun's contract and throws Ja-eun out of the house. Tae-hee who defends the right thing thinks that his family should get out of the farm and returns the farm to Ja-eun. Furthermore, he advises Ja-eun to be kind so that maybe Bok-ja will be willing to return the farm to her. Following his advice, Ja-eun buys a tent, lives outside the house, and helps on the farm. Later, it was that revealed Tae-hee's father, who is Chang-sik's brother, was hit and run by Baek In-ho's friend who framed him for 26 years ago.

== Cast ==
=== Main characters ===
- Uee as Baek Ja-eun

Ja-eun is a 25-year-old college student majoring in animation who comes to live with the Hwang family. She has an evil stepmother, Jung Yoon-sook, whom her father later divorced. Her father, Baek In-ho, lends the Ojakgyo farm to Hwang Chang-shik. At first, Ja-eun is self-absorbed and childish but soon she learns to be a better girl and helpful to Bok-ja. Lonely Ja-eun misses her real mother; that's why she comes to like Bok-ja's motherly care.

- Joo Won as Hwang Tae-hee

A smart 30 year old detective who does not talk much, Tae-hee is raised by his uncle and aunt, who regard him as their own son. Tae-hee's father died long ago while his mother remarried and died after Tae-hee grew up. However, he never met his mother. Tae-hee has an older stepbrother named Kim Je-ha whom he dislikes. They both have a special bond with Ja-eun. Later he learns that Ja-eun's father Baek In-ho supposedly killed his birth father Hwang Chang-hun in a hit-and-run. Although his parents and grandmother don't want him to marry Ja-eun, Tae-hee works hard to reveal who is the true murderer so that he can marry Ja-eun.

- Ryu Soo-young as Hwang Tae-beom

Tae-beom is the second son of the family who becomes a reporter at IBC. He marries rich Su-yeong after his first love leaves him. He often argues with Su-yeong. His mother-in-law insults him because he is poor. Tae-beom learns to love Su-yeong and in the end, he also learns to understand his mother-in-law and become father of he and Su-yeong's daughter Cha Gom.

- Choi Jung-yoon as Cha Su-yeong

Su-yeong is the daughter of wealthy Hyun-jae and Yeo-gyeong. She is also a reporter like her husband Tae-beom. She is emotional and ambitious. Even later her career position is higher than Tae-beom's.

- Jung Woong-in as Hwang Tae-sik

Tae-sik, the oldest son and a physical therapist. He feels that he never makes his parents happy. And as a man in late 30, he is not married yet, so he is very excited when he becomes pretty Ye-jin' boyfriend. Unfortunately, he finds out that he has a son, Guk-su, from a Philippine woman. He dislikes Guk-su although finally he wants to admit Guk-su as his son. Eventually, he asks his friend Kim Mi-suk to married her and lives happily with her, her adopted daughter Ha-na, and Guk-su.

- Yeon Woo-jin as Hwang Tae-pil

Tae-pil, the youngest of four, is a loser, playboy, seasonal model. He seems to have a smooth tongue and keen eyes for rich ladies. He is not good at school that Tae-hee has to keep an eye on him so he can graduate from school. He often fights with Tae-hee for most of their youth. Later, Tae-pil works in Su-yeong's aunt's shop and flirts with her who is much older than he is and a divorcee. His parents and Nam Yeo-eul's sister don't agree with their relationship and in the end, they break up.

- Baek Il-seob as Hwang Chang-shik, the father

Chang-shik lives happily with his wife, mother, and four sons which one of them is actually his nephew. Chang-shik's friend Baek In-ho lends him a farm to live for 10 years. Since Bok-ja is extremely happy when she gets the farm, Chang-shik does not dare to admit to her that the farm does not belong to them but In-ho. Soon, Chang-shik feels that he must be responsible for In-ho's daughter, Ja-eun. Previously, Chang-shik has been in debt, that his second son Tae-beom has to give him the money which Tae-beom has saved for his own wedding.

- Kim Ja-ok as Park Bok-ja, the mother

Diligent Bok-ja loves farming so much that she works hard to make the barren Ojakgyo farm fruitful. When she discovers that the farm actually does not belong to her, she is brokenhearted. She steals Ja-eun's contract and hides it. She also hates Ja-eun. However, when Ja-eun learns to be more understanding, Bok-ja loves her and acts as she is Ja-eun's mother. Bok-ja owns pear trees, chilies, ducks, and many more in her farm.

- Kim Yong-rim as Ship Kap-nyeon, the grandmother

She is Chang-sik's and Chang-hun's mother and grandmother of Hwang brothers. Her favorite grandchild is Tae-hee that she always defend Tae-hee because his father is already died.

- Kim Yong-gun as Cha Hyun-jae, Su-yeong's father

Hyun-jae was a transportation minister.

- Park Joon-geum as Nam Yeo-gyeong, Su-yeong's mother

Yeo-gyeong is a protective mother who spoils her only daughter Su-yeong. She cooks for her, organizes her clothes, wakes her up, and does many things for her precious Su-yeong, She even take all the wedding plans, the house, everything for her, later on Tae-beom gets irritated since she comes to their house without informing first.

=== Supporting characters ===
- Lee Young-ha as Baek In-ho, Ja-eun's father who marries three times
- Jo Mi-ryung as Jung Yoon-sook, Ja-eun's stepmother who betrayed her husband by playing with his subordinate
- Lee Dong-heon as Seo Dong-min, Tae-hee's trusted colleague
- Song Seon-mi as Nam Yeo-eul, Su-yeong's aunt who comes back from the United States before graduating and later becomes Tae-pil's love interest
- Jeon Mi-seon as Kim Mi-sook, Tae-sik's old school friend who raises her sister's daughter as her own daughter
- Park Hee-gun as Hwang Guk-su, Tae-sik's son
- Heo Tae-hee as Choi Hyun-wook, IBC reporter
- Yoon Joo-hee as Sung Ye-jin, Tae-sik's love who knows Tae-sik from her teacher, Cha Hyun-jae.
- Gong Jeong-hwan as Gong Jae-hwan, IBC Social Affairs News director, Tae-beom's and Su-yeong's boss
- Jung Suk-won as Kim Je-ha, Tae-hee's stepbrother
- Kim Hae-in as Han Hye-ryeong, Tae-boem's first love

=== Guests ===
- Jang Gwang as Retired officer Bong

== Ratings ==
In the table below, the blue numbers represent the lowest ratings and the red numbers represent the highest ratings.

=== 2011 ===
Episode #	Broadcast Date	TNmS Ratings		AGB Nielsen Ratings	
Episode #	Broadcast Date	Nationwide	Seoul National Capital Area	Nationwide	Seoul National Capital Area
1	6 August 2011	18.7%	19.9%	17.2%	17.9%
2	7 August 2011	21.2%	21.8%	20.5%	21.2%
3	13 August 2011	16.7%	17.2%	16.3%	16.2%
4	14 August 2011	22.1%	23.7%	19.7%	19.9%
5	20 August 2011	20.4%	20.8%	19.4%	18.3%
6	21 August 2011	25.0%	25.3%	24.0%	23.6%
7	27 August 2011	20.3%	21.3%	19.8%	19.9%
8	28 August 2011	21.7%	23.3%	21.1%	21.1%
9	3 September 2011	17.7%	19.1%	16.5%	16.5%
10	4 September 2011	22.0%	22.2%	22.8%	24.4%
11	10 September 2011	19.4%	19.1%	19.8%	19.6%
12	11 September 2011	20.5%	20.3%	19.4%	19.8%
13	17 September 2011	23.8%	23.9%	21.6%	22.2%
14	18 September 2011	29.1%	30.3%	26.8%	28.0%
15	24 September 2011	23.2%	24.1%	21.9%	22.7%
16	25 September 2011	27.7%	30.9%	27.8%	29.2%
17	1 October 2011	25.5%	26.0%	23.3%	24.1%
18	2 October 2011	28.1%	29.9%	26.5%	26.8%
19	8 October 2011	25.1%	25.5%	23.8%	23.7%
20	9 October 2011	29.9%	29.7%	29.2%	29.7%
21	15 October 2011	26.8%	26.0%	24.6%	24.4%
22	16 October 2011	30.3%	31.9%	28.9%	29.3%
23	22 October 2011	26.1%	25.9%	25.2%	25.3%
24	23 October 2011	30.5%	32.1%	29.4%	30.4%
25	29 October 2011	25.4%	27.4%	24.6%	25.7%
26	30 October 2011	29.9%	30.3%	28.3%	28.7%
27	5 November 2011	27.1%	29.5%	24.6%	25.0%
28	6 November 2011	30.4%	31.9%	30.7%	30.8%
29	12 November 2011	26.2%	26.7%	23.9%	24.5%
30	13 November 2011	32.0%	31.5%	30.2%	30.5%
31	19 November 2011	28.3%	28.5%	25.9%	25.8%
32	20 November 2011	34.1%	32.7%	30.3%	31.4%
33	26 November 2011	27.9%	28.6%	26.5%	26.8%
34	27 November 2011	32.7%	32.5%	32.6%	32.4%
35	3 December 2011	28.2%	28.9%	24.6%	24.5%
36	4 December 2011	32.8%	32.6%	30.8%	31.6%
37	10 December 2011	25.4%	29.0%	26.0%	26.9%
38	11 December 2011	33.7%	34.6%	32.0%	32.6%
39	17 December 2011	29.5%	29.5%	25.8%	25.6%
40	18 December 2011	33.6%	33.8%	33.3%	33.3%
41	24 December 2011	26.3%	27.9%	24.8%	24.7%
42	25 December 2011	31.4%	31.9%	31.7%	32.7%
43	31 December 2011	26.0%	26.9%	25.7%	25.7%
2012
44	1 January 2012	33.0%	34.0%	32.7%	32.7%
45	7 January 2012	28.8%	29.3%	27.5%	27.7%
46	8 January 2012	32.9%	34.7%	33.3%	33.7%
47	14 January 2012	29.1%	30.2%	28.1%	28.1%
48	15 January 2012	33.3%	35.2%	33.6%	33.9%
49	21 January 2012	25.2%	26.1%	27.0%	26.1%
50	22 January 2012	22.9%	22.1%	25.7%	25.9%
51	28 January 2012	27.8%	26.2%	28.1%	29.5%
52	29 January 2012	29.4%	28.3%	33.0%	34.1%
53	4 February 2012	28.3%	27.6%	29.0%	29.6%
54	5 February 2012	33.9%	31.9%	32.6%	32.8%
55	11 February 2012	31.6%	32.5%	29.4%	29.2%
56	12 February 2012	37.5%	39.6%	34.9%	35.9%
57	18 February 2012	32.7%	31.9%	29.8%	30.0%
58	19 February 2012	37.7%	36.4%	36.3%	36.4%
Average ratings		27.53%	28.12%	26.53%	26.88%

== Awards and nominations ==
Year	Award	Category	Recipient	Result
2011	KBS Drama Awards	Excellence Award, Actor in a Serial Drama	Ryu Soo-young	Nominated
2011	KBS Drama Awards	Excellence Award, Actress in Serial Drama	Choi Jung-yoon	Nominated
2011	KBS Drama Awards	Excellence Award, Actress in Serial Drama	Kim Ja-ok	Won
2011	KBS Drama Awards	Best Supporting Actor	Jung Woong-in	Won
2011	KBS Drama Awards	Best New Actor	Joo Won	Won
2011	KBS Drama Awards	Best New Actress	Uee	Won
2011	KBS Drama Awards	Best Young Actor	Park Hee-gun	Won
2011	KBS Drama Awards	Best Writer	Lee Jung-sun	Won
2011	KBS Drama Awards	Best Couple Award	Ryu Soo-young and Choi Jung-yoon	Won
2012	48th Baeksang Arts Awards	Best New Actor (TV)	Joo Won	Won
2012	48th Baeksang Arts Awards	Best New Actress (TV)	Uee	Won
