= Bunshinsaba (2004 film) =

- Poster for Bunshinsaba (2004)
- Hangul: 분신사바
- RR: Bunsinsaba
- MR: Punsinsaba
- Directed by: Ahn Byeong-ki
- Written by: Ahn Byeong-ki
- Produced by: Kim Yong-dae
- Starring: Kim Gyu-ri; Lee Se-eun; Lee Yu-ri; Choi Seong-min; Choi Jung-yoon
- Cinematography: Kim Dong-cheon
- Edited by: Park Sun-deok
- Music by: Lee Sang-ho
- Production companies: A-Post Pictures; Toilet Pictures
- Distributed by: Buena Vista International Korea
- Release date: 30 July 2004
- Running time: 92 minutes
- Country: South Korea
- Language: Korean

Bunshinsaba (Korean: 분신사바) is a 2004 South Korean supernatural horror film directed by Ahn Byeong-ki.

In 2004, it screened at the 8th annual Bucheon International Fantastic Film Festival. The film had its American premiere at the 2005 New York Korean Film Festival, and was shown later that year at the 5th annual Screamfest Horror Film Festival.

== Plot ==
Lee Yoo-jin is a transfer student from Seoul who is usually bullied and picked on by her classmates, except for two girls, who become her friends and are often bullied as well as a result. One night, Yoo-jin and her friends decide to place a curse on their bullies by creating a Ouija board on which they write the names of the female bullies. With the board, the girls decide to use the Bunshinsaba curse, and as they use the board to cast the curse, one of Yoo-jin's friends warns the others not to open their eyes until the spell is finished. The girls close their eyes, but soon enough, Yoo-jin, somewhat curious, opens her eyes. To her shock and horror, she sees an image of a pale ghost girl with long hair beside her.

The next morning, when Yoo-jin enters the classroom, she discovers the corpse of one of the bullies on top of the desk, with a burned face. Meanwhile, the school hires a volunteer teacher, Lee Eun-Ju, as the new art instructor. She starts to call the roll in her class and stumbles on seat number 29 as she mentions the name of the dead bully, Kim In-sook. The students are terrified when they hear the name, and rush out of the classroom when they see her talking to thin air and believing that In-sook is still there speaking to her. Yoo-jin tries to convince Eun-ju that In-sook is not real, but Eun-ju does not listen. Investigations soon rise as the other three bullies die in the same manner, with their corpses all being left at Yoo-jin's desk. Yoo-jin and her friends wonder if the curse is the reason why their bullies have died, but as time goes on, Yoo-jin discovers that the ghost of In-sook is possessing her and that she killed the other bullies while under In-sook's spiteful control.

Eun-ju, who remains a part of the staff, senses a terrible force and unearthly presence surrounding Yoo-jin. Mr. Han, Yoo-jin's class adviser, decides to help out by consulting his friend on what is causing her to act strangely. Through hypnotism, they are able to see a vision of the past showing how In-sook and her mother Chun-hee were brutally killed by a group of villagers, and before dying, they placed a curse that for generations to come, whoever left the village would die, and that In-sook planned to humiliate and get Yoon-jin in trouble by murdering and using her body, and Chun-hee's spirit senses her daughter is active and decides to get revenge. As Chun-hee takes possession of Eun-ju's body, she exacts punishment on the people who wronged them, slaying the school's principal but sparing Mr. Han's life.

Not long after, Eun-ju gives birth to a girl, and within that girl's body is the spirit of Kim In-sook.

== Cast ==
- Kim Gyu-ri as Lee Eun-ju
- Lee Yu-ri as Kim In-sook
- Lee Se-eun as Lee Yoo-jin
- Choi Seong-min as Han Jae-hoon/Mr. Han
- Choi Jung-yoon as Ho-kyung
- Lee Ji-hyun as Teacher

== Release ==
Bunshinsaba was released by Buena Vista International Korea in South Korea on 30 July 2004.

== See also ==
- List of ghost films
