= Cheongdam-dong Scandal =

- Promotional poster
- Also known as: Scandal
- Genre: Melodrama; Romance; Family; Mystery
- Written by: Kim Ji-eun
- Directed by: Jung Hyo
- Starring: Choi Jung-yoon; Lee Joong-moon; Kang Seong-min; Seo Eun-chae; Lim Seong-eon
- Music by: Park Se-joon
- Country of origin: South Korea
- Original language: Korean
- No. of episodes: 119

Production
- Executive producer: Han Jung-hwan
- Producer: Jo Eun-jung
- Production location: Korea
- Running time: 40 minutes Mondays to Fridays at 08:30 (KST)
- Production company: Hwa&Dam Pictures

Original release
- Network: SBS TV
- Release: July 21, 2014 – January 2, 2015

Cheongdam-dong Scandal (Korean: 청담동 스캔들) is a 2014 South Korean morning soap opera starring Choi Jung-yoon, Lee Joong-moon, Kang Seong-min, Seo Eun-chae and Lim Seong-eon. It aired on SBSTV from July 21, 2014 to January 2, 2015 on Mondays to Fridays at 8:30 a.m. for 119 episodes.

Despite airing in a morning time slot, Cheongdam-dong Scandal hit a peak rating of 22.1% during its 112th episode on December 24, 2014, and had average ratings of 14.8%.

== Plot ==
Cheongdam-dong is the seat of wealth and prestige in Korean high society, but an ugly, deeply rooted scandal shakes it to its core when a woman who is determined to get pregnant learns that she is being deceived by the family (her mother-in-law, sister-in-law, and her husband) she was married into, and discovering that the building designer (whose mother supposedly had died) that she just befriended was a person she saved when she was a young girl. She is unaware that she is being sought after by her birth mother (after a woman kidnapped her when she was a baby), who is now married to a businessman and now has a daughter who happens to be jealous of her because she sees her as a rival for the love of her life.

== Cast ==
- Choi Jung-yoon as Eun Hyun-soo
- Lee Joong-moon as Jang Seo-joon
  - Jeon Jin-seo as young Jang Seo-joon
- Kang Seong-min as Bok Soo-ho
- Seo Eun-chae as Nam Joo-na
- Lim Seong-eon as Lee Jae-ni
- Ban Hyo-jung as Jang Hye-im
- Lee Hye-eun as So-jung
- Kim Seung-hwan as Joon-gyu
- Uhm Bo-yong as Cho-won
- Kim Hye-sun as Kang Bok-hee
- Kim Jung-woon as Bok Kyung-ho / Kim Young-gyu
- Yu Ji-in as Choi Se-ran
- Im Ha-ryong as Nam Jae-bok
- Lee Sang-sook as Woo Soon-jung / Lee Do-hwa
- Yang Hae-rim as Park Hye-jung
- Kim Sung-kyung as Dr. Yoon
- Seo Yi as Yoon-joo
- Kim Sa-hee as Joo Young-in
- Lee Jung-gil
- Jang Mi-hee
- Choi Hyun-soo
- Ahn So-mi

== Original soundtrack ==
Cheongdam-dong Scandal OST

Soundtrack album by Various artists
- Recorded: 2014
- Genre: Soundtrack
- Languages: Korean; English
- Labels: Danal Entertainment, Deohagi Media

=== Part 1 ===
Released on September 2, 2014
No.	Title	Artist	Length
1.	"You Give Me Happiness" (행복을 주는 사람)	Song Ha-ye	3:15
2.	"You Give Me Happiness" (CMR)
3.	"You Give Me Happiness" (F.G. Version)

=== Part 2 ===
Released on September 11, 2014
No.	Title	Artist	Length
1.	"That Place" (그 곳)	Hazel	3:20
2.	"That Place" (MR)

=== Part 3 ===
Released on September 19, 2014
No.	Title	Artist	Length
1.	"Breakups are All the Same" (이별이 다 그런 거지)	Bubble Sisters	4:48
2.	"Breakups are All the Same" (Inst.)		4:48
Total length:			9:36

=== Part 4 ===
Released on September 23, 2014
No.	Title	Artist	Length
1.	"Only Think of You" (너만 생각나)	Ji Hoon	4:05
2.	"Only Think of You" (Inst.)		4:05
Total length:			8:10

=== Part 5 ===
Released on October 2, 2014
No.	Title	Artist	Length
1.	"You Give Me Happiness" (행복을 주는 사람)	J2M	3:50
2.	"You Give Me Happiness" (Inst.)		3:50
Total length:			7:40

=== Part 6 ===
Released on October 23, 2014
No.	Title	Artist	Length
1.	"What Do I Do?" (어떡하죠)	The Daisy	3:30
2.	"What Do I Do?" (Inst.)		3:30
Total length:			7:00

=== Part 7 ===
Released on November 7, 2014
No.	Title	Artist	Length
1.	"End of Hurting Time" (아팠던 시간의 끝)	Soul Cry	3:36
2.	"End of Hurting Time" (Inst.)		3:36
Total length:			7:12

=== Part 8 ===
Released on December 10, 2014
No.	Title	Artist	Length
1.	"Although It's Hurt, I Don't Hate You" (아픈데 밉지가 않아)	DK Soul	3:44
2.	"Although It's Hurt, I Don't Hate You" (Guitar Version)
3.	"Although It's Hurt, I Don't Hate You" (Inst.)		3:44

=== Part 9 ===
Released on December 17, 2014
No.	Title	Artist	Length
1.	"Farewell" (이별인가요)	BB Ahn	3:49
2.	"Farewell" (Inst.)		3:49
Total length:			7:38

=== Part 10 ===
Released on December 22, 2014
No.	Title	Artist	Length
1.	"Love Doesn't Stop" (사랑은 멈추지 않는다)	Heo Gong	3:38
2.	"Love Doesn't Stop" (Agtr.)
3.	"Love Doesn't Stop" (Inst.)		3:38

=== Part 11 ===
Released on December 26, 2014
No.	Title	Artist	Length
1.	"If we Broke Up" (우리 헤어진다면)	BadBosS (with Club Soul)	3:16
2.	"If we Broke Up" (Inst.)		3:16
Total length:			6:32

=== Part 12 ===
Released on December 30, 2014
No.	Title	Artist	Length
1.	"Someone that Makes Me Happy" (행복을 주는 사람 (feat. AM))	Melody Factory	2:50
2.	"Someone that Makes Me Happy" (Inst.)		2:50
Total length:			5:40

== Awards and nominations ==
Year	Award	Category	Recipient	Result
2014	SBS Drama Awards	Excellence Award, Actor in a Serial Drama	Kang Seong-min	Nominated
2014	SBS Drama Awards	Excellence Award, Actress in a Serial Drama	Choi Jung-yoon	Won
2014	SBS Drama Awards	Excellence Award, Actress in a Serial Drama	Lim Seong-eon	Nominated
2014	SBS Drama Awards	Special Award, Actress in a Serial Drama	Kim Hye-sun	Won
