= Kim Gyu-ri (actress, born June 1979) =

South Korean actress (born 1979)

- Born: Kim Moon-sun; 27 June 1979 (age 47); Seoul, South Korea
- Education: Chung-Ang University - Theatre and Film
- Occupation: Actress
- Years active: 1994–present
- Agent: Vista Entertainment

Korean name
- Hangul: 김규리
- Hanja: 金奎里
- RR: Gim Gyuri
- MR: Kim Kyuri

Birth name
- Hangul: 김문선
- Hanja: 金門宣
- RR: Gim Munseon
- MR: Kim Munsŏn

Kim Gyu-ri (Korean: 김규리; born 27 June 1979), birth name Kim Moon-sun (김문선), is a South Korean actress.

== Filmography ==
=== Film ===
- Where Are To Go? (2013)
- My Darling FBI (2008)
- Tarzan Park Heung-sook (2005)
- Bunshinsaba (2004)
- Libera Me (2000)
- Nightmare (2000)
- Weathering the Storms (1999)
- Whispering Corridors (1998)

=== Television series ===
- Lights and Shadows (MBC, 2011–2012)
- Can't Stop Now (MBC, 2009)
- Lovers (SBS, 2006)
- Immortal Admiral Yi Sun-sin (KBS1, 2004)
- Children of Heaven (KBS2, 2002)
- Sun-hee and Jin-hee (MBC, 2001)
- Medical Center (SBS, 2000)
- Popcorn (SBS, 2000)
- Roses and Bean Sprouts (MBC, 1999)
- Because I Love You (SBS, 1997)
- Spin (KBS2, 1997)
- One Fine Spring Day (KBS2, 1997)
- Hometown of Legends - 90s Series (KBS2, 1996)
- LA Arirang (SBS, 1995)
- Reporting for Duty (KBS2, 1994)

=== Music video appearances ===
- Choi Jin-young - "영원" (1999)
- Kim Min-jong - "Pure" (1999)

== Awards ==
- 1999 22nd Golden Cinematography Awards: Best New Actress (Whispering Corridors)
- 1999 7th Chunsa Film Art Awards: Best New Actress (Whispering Corridors)
