= Phone (film) =

2002 South Korean supernatural horror film

- Theatrical poster
- Hangul: 폰
- Lit.: Phone
- RR: Pon
- MR: P'on
- Directed by: Ahn Byeong-ki
- Written by: Ahn Byeong-ki; Lee Yu-jin
- Produced by: Ahn Byeong-ki
- Starring: Ha Ji-won; Kim Yoo-mi
- Cinematography: Mun Yong-sik
- Edited by: Park Soon-duk
- Music by: Lee Sang-ho
- Production company: Toilet Pictures
- Distributed by: Buena Vista International Korea
- Release date: 26 July 2002
- Running time: 103 minutes
- Country: South Korea
- Language: Korean
- Box office: US$21.7 million

Phone (Korean: 폰; RR: Pon), released in the Philippines as The Phone, is a 2002 South Korean supernatural horror film written and directed by Ahn Byeong-ki and starring Ha Ji-won and Kim Yoo-mi.

== Plot ==
After writing a series of articles about a pedophilia scandal, the journalist Ji-won often receives threatening calls on her cell phone. Hence she changes her number and moves to an empty house which is owned by her sister Ho-jung and Ho-jung's husband Chang-hoon. One day, Ho-jung's daughter Young-ju answers an anonymous phone call to Ji-won's new number, then screams and passes out. Days after, Young-ju begins to show a disturbing attraction for her father and jealous rejection towards her mother. Meanwhile, Ji-won gets more anonymous calls and sees a long-haired ghost playing Beethoven's "Moonlight Sonata" on the piano. She finds out that her number originally belonged to a missing teenager, Jin-hee, and that its two subsequent owners had died mysteriously in unusual circumstances.

Ji-won visits Jin-hee's mother at their home and finds a diary and a picture of Jin-hee and Jin-hee's best friend, Sang-mi. Ji-won goes to Sang-mi who is now blind and deaf. Since Sang-mi was haunted by Jin-hee's spirit, she decides to stab her own eyes and ears to make it leave her. She says that before she went missing, Jin-hee was obsessively in love with an older man whom she tried hard to impress by practicing "Moonlight Sonata". However they broke up even though she was pregnant with his child. Ji-won explains to Young-ju's parents that Young-ju could be in danger, but Chang-hoon's refusal to accept it upsets Ji-won. In Ji-won's flashback, it is shown that Ho-jung had been infertile, so Ji-won gave Ho-jung her egg for in vitro fertilisation in order to conceive Young-ju. In this sense, Young-ju is not Ji-won's niece but her biological daughter, whom she loves and cares deeply for.

Ji-won continues her investigation into Jin-hee's diary. In surprise and shock, she learns that Jin-hee's lover was indeed Chang-hoon. He used to cheat on his wife by bringing Jin-hee to the house Ji-won is staying at, but soon after Jin-hee became overly attached, he, despite her pleas, broke it off, as he never wanted to leave his family. Jin-hee found out she was pregnant and called Chang-hoon repeatedly but he ignored her. Believing that Chang-hoon has something to do with Jin-hee's disappearance (more likely death), Ji-won threatens to tell his wife if he does not cooperate. Young-ju, who is possessed by Jin-hee's ghost, goes to Ji-won's house, in Bang Bae, jumps down the stairs and is hospitalized. Ji-won searches the entire house and finds Jin-hee's dead body hidden inside one of the walls. At this point, Chang-hoon arrives and sees everything. They run away before getting knocked unconscious by Ho-jung.

Ho-jung confesses that she discovered the affair years ago and confronted Jin-hee. In her denial, Jin-hee fooled herself that Chang-hoon truly loved her, and mocked Ho-jung's infertility. Ho-jung told Jin-hee to abort, which made her mad, resulting in a fight. By accident, Ho-jung pushed Jin-hee down the stairs and killed her. Ho-jung hid Jin-hee's body inside the wall and plastered cement over it. With no regret, Ho-jung claims that aside from being jealous of Jin-hee, she is also jealous of Ji-won, who secretly shares with Ho-jung the motherhood of her daughter. Ho-jung then stages a suicide for Chang-hoon, who has died, making it seem that he was guilty for both Jin-hee and Ji-won's deaths before killing himself in the bathtub.

Ho-jung plans to burn the house down with gasoline. However, Jin-hee's spirit awakens and, in revenge, strangles Ho-jung to death, thus saving Ji-won. The film ends with Ji-won dropping the cursed cell phone into the ocean. After it enters the water, it rings.

== Cast ==
- Ha Ji-won as Ji-won, a young journalist
- Kim Yoo-mi as Ho-jung
- Choi Woo-jae as Chang-hoon
- Choi Ji-yeon as Jin-hee
- Eun Seo-woo as Young-ju
- Jung Woon-sun as High School Student
- Choi Jung-yoon as Min Ja-young

== Release ==
Produced by Toilet Pictures, Phone was released by Buena Vista International Korea in South Korea on 26 July 2002. Phone was among the highest grossing domestic productions in South Korea in 2002, having 2,182,915 tickets sold making the eighth highest grossing domestic production that year in South Korea. In the Philippines, the film was released as The Phone by Buena Vista International on October 29, 2003. Phone received theatrical distribution in multiplex cinemas in the United Kingdom in August 2004.

Imprint Entertainment bought the rights for an American remake in 2009.

== Reception ==
Jason Gibner of AllMovie commented on Phone, stating that despite the film "having many good scares", if the viewer was familiar with Ring, The Eye or Ju-on they would not find much fresh in the film as Phone "relies far too heavily on visual frights that have been executed many times in the past."

== See also ==
- Korean horror
