= Ahn Byeong-ki =

South Korean director and producer

- Born: November 5, 1966 (age 60); South Korea
- Occupations: director, screenwriter
- Years active: 1992-present

Korean name
- Hangul: 안병기
- RR: An Byeonggi
- MR: An Pyŏnggi

Ahn Byeong-ki (born November 5, 1966, or 1967) is a South Korean film director, producer, and screenwriter specializing in horror films. His representative horror works are Phone and Bunshinsaba, while his non-horror produced movies include Scandal Makers and Sunny.

== Filmography ==
Feature films of Ahn Byeong-ki
Year	Title		Credited as			Ref.
Year	English	Korean	director	Screenplay	Producer	Ref.
1992	White Badge	하얀전쟁	Assistant director	No	No	
1994	Life and Death of the Hollywood Kid	헐리우드 키드의 생애	Assistant director	No	No	
1996	Ivan the Mercenary	용병 이반	Assistant director	No	No	
1997	Blackjack	블랙잭	Assistant director	No	No	
1998	Naked Being	까	Assistant director	No	No	
2000	Nightmare	가위	Yes	Yes	No	
2002	Phone	폰	Yes	Yes	No	
2004	Bunshinsaba	분신사바	Yes	Yes	No	
2006	Dark Forest - 4 Horror Tales	죽음의 숲 – 어느 날 갑자기 네번째 이야기	No	No	Yes	
2006	Roommates - 4 Horror Tales	D-day – 어느 날 갑자기 세번째 이야기	No	No	Yes	
2006	Forbidden Floor - 4 Horror Tales	네번째 층 – 어느 날 갑자기 두번째 이야기	No	No	Yes	
2006	February 29 - 4 Horror Tales	2월 29일 – 어느날 갑자기 첫번째 이야기	No	No	Yes	
2006	Apt.	아파트	Yes	Yes	Yes	
2008	Scandal Makers	과속스캔들	No	No	Yes	
2010	Death Bell 2: Bloody Camp	두번째 이야기 : 교생실습	No	No	No	Production department
2011	Sunny	써니	No	No	Yes	production department
2012	Bunshinsaba		Yes	No	No	
2013	Bunshinsaba 2		Yes	No	No	
2014	Bunshinsaba 3		Yes	No	No	
2016	Scandal Maker		Yes	No	No	
