= List of programs broadcast by Seoul Broadcasting System =

This is a list of programs currently, formerly or soon to be broadcast nationally (Note: Based on the data which presented from Seoul, the capital city of South Korea, where its headquarters has been located since its creation of the national broadcasting network across the nation.) on SBS Television.

== Dramas ==
SBS primetime flagship dramas are broadcast at 22:00, with each series airing on two consecutive nights: Mondays and Tuesdays Wednesdays and Thursdays, and Fridays and Saturdays.

=== Monday–Tuesday ===
==== 1990s ====
Year	English title	Korean title
1991–1992	Women 45	여자 마흔다섯
1992	Bun-rye's Story	분례기
1992	Small City	작은 도시
1992	Calendula	금잔화
1992	Morning Thaw	해빙기의 아침
1992	Rose Garden	장미정원
1992	Tragic Grass	비련초; 1992
1992	The Woman Who Walked on Water	물 위를 걷는 여자
1992	To Give Over Campfire	모닥불에 바친다
1992–1993	Gwanchon Essay	관촌 수필
1992–1993	Reunion	재회
1993	How Is Your Husband?	댁의 남편은 어떠십니까?
1993	Our Hot Song	우리들 뜨거운 노래
1993	World Is Mine	세상은 내게
1993	Love and Friendship	사랑과 우정
1993	Theme Series	테마 시리즈
1993–1994	Marriage	결혼
1993–1994	Faraway Songbagang	머나먼 쏭바강
1994	Three Men, Three Women	세 남자 세 여자
1994	Goblin Is Coming	도깨비가 간다
1994	Farewell	작별
1994	Hero's Diary	영웅일기
1994–1995	What Have You Done Yet	여태 뭘 했수
1995	Confession	고백
1995	Sandglass	모래시계; 1995
1995	Jang Hee-bin	장희빈
1995–1996	Flames of Ambition	야망의 불꽃
1996	Full Heart	만강
1996–1997	When Salmon Returns	연어가 돌아올 때
1997	Women	여자
1997–1998	Because I Love You	사랑하니까
1998	Song of the Wind	바람의 노래
1998	White Nights 3.98	백야 3.98
1998–1999	Eun Shil	은실이
1999	Ghost	고스트
1999	Woman on Top	맛을 보여드립니다

==== 2000s ====
Year	English title	Korean title
2000	Legends of Love	사랑의 전설
2000	The Thief's Daughter	도둑의 딸
2000	Wrath of an Angel	천사의 분노
2000–2001	Rookie	루키
2001–2002	Ladies in the Palace	여인천하
2002–2003	Rustic Period	야인시대
2003–2004	The King's Woman	왕의 여자
2004	2004 Human Market	2004 인간시장
2004	Jang Gil-san	장길산
2004–2005	Love Story in Harvard	러브스토리 인 하버드
2005	Three Leaf Clover (TV series)	세잎클로버
2005	Bad Housewife	불량 주부
2005	Fashion 70s	패션 70's
2005–2006	Ballad of Seodong	서동요
2006	Alone in Love	연애시대
2006	The 101st Proposal	101번째 프러포즈
2006	Stranger than Paradise	천국보다 낯선
2006	Common Single	독신천하
2006–2007	Snow Flower	눈꽃
2007	The Person I Love	사랑하는 사람아
2007	My Husband's Woman	내 남자의 여자
2007	Catching Up with Gangnam Moms	강남엄마 따라잡기
2007–2008	The King and I	왕과 나
2008	I Love You	사랑해
2008	Tokyo Sun Shower	도쿄 여우비
2008	Gourmet	식객
2008	Tazza	타짜
2008–2009	Terroir	떼루아
2009	Ja Myung Go	자명고
2009	Dream	드림
2009	Temptation of an Angel	천사의 유혹

==== 2010s ====
Year	English title	Korean title
2010	Stars Falling from the Sky	별을 따다줘
2010	Jejungwon	제중원
2010	Oh! My Lady	오! 마이 레이디
2010	Giant	자이언트
2010	Coffee House	커피하우스
2010	I Am Legend	나는 전설이다
2010	Dr. Champ	닥터 챔프
2010–2011	It's Okay, Daddy's Girl	괜찮아, 아빠딸
2010–2011	Athena: Goddess of War	아테나: 전쟁의 여신
2011	Paradise Ranch	파라다이스 목장
2011	Midas	마이더스
2011	Lie to Me	내게 거짓말을 해봐
2011	Warrior Baek Dong-soo	무사 백동수
2011	A Thousand Days' Promise	천일의 약속
2012	History of a Salaryman	샐러리맨 초한지
2012	Fashion King	패션왕
2012	The Chaser	추적자
2012	Faith	신의
2012–2013	The King of Dramas	드라마의 제왕
2013	King of Ambition	야왕
2013	Jang Ok-jung, Living by Love	장옥정, 사랑에 살다
2013	Empire of Gold	황금의 제국
2013	The Suspicious Housekeeper	수상한 가정부
2013–2014	One Warm Word	따뜻한 말 한마디
2014	God's Gift: 14 Days	신의 선물 – 14일
2014	Doctor Stranger	닥터 이방인
2014	Temptation	유혹
2014	Secret Door	비밀의 문
2014	Punch	펀치
2015	Heard It Through the Grapevine	풍문으로 들었소
2015	High Society	상류사회
2015	Mrs. Cop	미세스 캅
2015–2016	Six Flying Dragons	육룡이 나르샤
2016	The Royal Gambler	대박
2016	The Doctors	닥터스
2016	Moon Lovers: Scarlet Heart Ryeo	달의 연인 – 보보경심 려
2016	Dr. Romantic	낭만닥터 김사부
2017	Innocent Defendant	피고인
2017	Whisper	귓속말
2017	My Sassy Girl	엽기적인 그녀
2017	Distorted	조작
2017	Temperature of Love	사랑의 온도
2017–2018	Oh, the Mysterious	의문의 일승
2018	Should We Kiss First?	키스 먼저 할까요?
2018	Exit	엑시트
2018	Wok of Love	기름진 멜로
2018	Still 17	서른이지만 열일곱입니다
2018	Where Stars Land	여우각시별
2018	The Hymn of Death	사의 찬미
2018–2019	My Strange Hero	복수가 돌아왔다
2019	Haechi	해치
2019	The Secret Life of My Secretary	초면에 사랑합니다
2019	Everything and Nothing	17세의 조건
2019	VIP	VIP

==== 2020s ====
Year	English title	Korean title	Ref.
2020	Dr. Romantic 2	낭만닥터 김사부 2	
2020	Nobody Knows	아무도 모른다	
2020	Good Casting	굿캐스팅	
2020	Do You Like Brahms?	브람스를 좋아하세요	
2020–2021	Penthouse	펜트하우스	
2021	Joseon Exorcist	조선구마사	
2021	Racket Boys	라켓소년단	
2021	Lovers of the Red Sky	홍천기	
2021–2022	Our Beloved Summer	그 해 우리는	
2022	Business Proposal	사내 맞선	
2022	Woori the Virgin	오늘부터 우리는	
2022	Cheer Up	치얼업	
2022–2023	Trolley	트롤리	
2023	The Secret Romantic Guesthouse	꽃선비 열애사	
2025	The Haunted Palace	귀궁	

=== Wednesday–Thursday ===
Off-Air On-Air Upcoming

==== 1990s ====
Year	English title	Korean title
1992	The Chemistry Is Right	궁합이 맞습니다
1992–1993	Beloved Darling (TV series)	사랑하는 당신
1993	Han River Cuckoo	한강 뻐꾸기
1993–1994	To the Lovely Others	친애하는 기타 여러분
1994	How This Señor Lives	이 남자가 사는 법
1994	What a Good Stuff	좋은걸 어떡해
1994	There Is No Love	사랑은 없다
1995	Seoul Nocturne	서울 야상곡
1995	Love Is Blue	사랑은 블루
1995	Sandglass	모래시계
1995	Until We Meet Again	다시 만날 때까지
1995	Asphalt Man	아스팔트 사나이
1995	Inside the Mysterious Mirror	신비의 거울속으로
1995	Jazz	째즈
1995–1996	Thaw	해빙
1996	In The Name of Love	사랑의 이름으로
1996	Thief	도둑
1996	Expedition of Men	남자 대탐험
1996	August Bride	8월의 신부
1996–1997	The Brothers' River	형제의 강
1997	Model	모델
1997	Tears of Roses	장미의 눈물
1997	Snail	달팽이
1997–1998	White Christmas	화이트 크리스마스
1998	Shadows of an Old Love	옛사랑의 그림자
1998	Steal My Heart	내 마음을 뺏어봐
1998	Mister Q	미스터Q
1998	Hong Gil-dong	홍길동
1998	Winners	승부사
1998	The Solid Man	단단한 놈
1999	House Above the Waves	파도위의 집
1999	Trap of Youth	청춘의 덫
1999	Tomato	토마토
1999	Happy Together	해피 투게더
1999	Queen	퀸
1999	Crystal	크리스탈
1999–2000	TV movie Love Story	TV영화 러브스토리

==== 2000s ====
Year	English title	Korean title
2000	Fireworks	불꽃
2000	Popcorn	팝콘
2000	SWAT Police	경찰특공대
2000	Juliet's Man	줄리엣의 남자
2000–2001	Cheers for Women	여자만세
2001	Soon Ja	순자
2001	Beautiful Days	아름다운 날들
2001	Law Firm	로펌
2001	Guardian Angel	수호천사
2001	Legend	신화
2001–2002	Piano	피아노
2002	We Are Dating Now	지금은 연애중
2002	Successful Story of a Bright Girl	명랑소녀 성공기
2002	Bad Girls	나쁜 여자들
2002	Age of Innocence	순수의 시대
2002	How Should I Be	정
2002–2003	Shoot for the Star	별을 쏘다
2003	All In	올인
2003	Land of Wine	술의 나라
2003	Fairy and Swindler	선녀와 사기꾼
2003	My Fair Lady	요조숙녀
2003	Strike	때려
2003–2004	Stairway to Heaven	천국의 계단
2004	Sunlight Pours Down	햇빛 쏟아지다
2004	Miss Kim's Adventures in Making a Million	파란만장 미스김 10억 만들기
2004	Island Village Teacher	섬마을 선생님
2004	My 19 Year Old Sister-in-Law	형수님은 열아홉
2004	When a Man Is in Love	남자가 사랑할 때
2004–2005	Stained Glass	유리화
2005	Hong Kong Express	홍콩 익스프레스
2005	Hello My Teacher	건빵선생과 별사탕
2005	Single Again	돌아온 싱글
2005	Princess Lulu	루루공주
2005	Love Needs a Miracle	사랑은 기적이 필요해
2005–2006	My Girl	마이걸
2006	Tree of Heaven	천국의 나무
2006	Bad Family	불량가족
2006	Smile Again	스마일 어게인
2006	Please Come Back, Soon-ae	돌아와요 순애씨
2006	Invincible Parachute Agent	무적의 낙하산 요원
2006–2007	Lovers	연인
2007	Surgeon Bong Dal-hee	외과의사 봉달희
2007	Witch Yoo-hee	마녀유희
2007	War of Money	쩐의 전쟁
2007	How to Meet a Perfect Neighbor	완벽한 이웃을 만나는 법
2007	Lobbyist	로비스트
2008	Robber	불한당
2008	On Air	온에어
2008	Iljimae	일지매
2008	Working Mom	워킹맘
2008	Painter of the Wind	바람의 화원
2008–2009	Star's Lover	스타의 연인
2009	Cain and Abel	카인과 아벨
2009	City Hall	시티홀
2009	Swallow the Sun	태양을 삼켜라
2009	You're Beautiful	미남이시네요
2009–2010	Will It Snow for Christmas?	크리스마스에 눈이 올까요?

==== 2010s ====
Year	English title	Korean title
2010	OB & GY	산부인과
2010	Prosecutor Princess	검사 프린세스
2010	Bad Guy	나쁜 남자
2010	My Girlfriend Is a Gumiho	내 여자친구는 구미호
2010	Big Thing	대물
2011	Sign	싸인
2011	49 Days	49일
2011	City Hunter	시티헌터
2011	Protect the Boss	보스를 지켜라
2011	Deep Rooted Tree	뿌리깊은 나무
2012	Take Care of Us, Captain	부탁해요 캡틴
2012	Rooftop Prince	옥탑방 왕세자
2012	Phantom	유령
2012	To the Beautiful You	아름다운 그대에게
2012–2013	The Great Seer	대풍수
2013	That Winter, the Wind Blows	그 겨울, 바람이 분다
2013	All About My Romance	내 연애의 모든 것
2013	I Can Hear Your Voice	너의 목소리가 들려
2013	Master's Sun	주군의 태양
2013	The Heirs	왕관을 쓰려는자, 그 무게를 견뎌라 – 상속자들
2013–2014	My Love from the Star	별에서 온 그대
2014	Three Days	쓰리 데이즈
2014	You're All Surrounded	너희들은 포위됐다
2014	It's Okay, That's Love	괜찮아, 사랑이야
2014	My Lovely Girl	내겐 너무 사랑스러운 그녀
2014–2015	Pinocchio	피노키오
2015	Hyde Jekyll, Me	하이드 지킬, 나
2015	A Girl Who Sees Smells	냄새를 보는 소녀
2015	Mask	가면
2015	Yong-pal	용팔이
2015	The Village: Achiara's Secret	마을 : 아치아라의 비밀
2015	Remember	리멤버 – 아들의 전쟁
2016	Come Back Mister	돌아와요 아저씨
2016	Entertainer	딴따라
2016	Wanted	원티드
2016	Don't Dare to Dream	질투의
2016	The Legend of the Blue Sea	푸른 바다의 전설
2017	Saimdang, Memoir of Colors	사임당, 빛의 일기
2017	Suspicious Partner	수상한 파트너
2017	Reunited Worlds	다시 만난 세계
2017	While You Were Sleeping	당신이 잠든 사이에
2017–2018	Judge vs. Judge	이판사판
2018	Return	리턴
2018	Switch	스위치 – 세상을 바꿔라
2018	The Undateables	훈남정음
2018	Your Honor	친애하는 판사님께
2018	Heart Surgeons	흉부외과
2018	The Last Empress	황후의 품격
2019	Big Issue	빅이슈
2019	My Absolute Boyfriend	절대 그이
2019	Doctor Detective	닥터 탐정
2019	Secret Boutique	시크릿 부티크

==== 2020s ====
Year	English title	Korean title
2025	Dynamite Kiss	키스는 괜히 해서!
2026	Sold Out on You	오늘도 매진했습니다
2026	Nine to Six	나인 투 식스

==== Thursday (21:00) ====
- The Killing Vote (국민사형투표; 2023)

=== Friday–Saturday ===
Off-Air On-Air Upcoming

Year	English title	Korean title	Ref.
2019	The Fiery Priest	열혈사제	
2019	Nokdu Flower	녹두꽃	
2019	Doctor John	의사요한	
2019	Vagabond	배가본드	
2019–2020	Hot Stove League	스토브리그	
2020	Hyena	하이에나	
2020	The King: Eternal Monarch	더 킹: 영원의 군주	
2020	Backstreet Rookie	편의점 샛별이	
2020	Alice	앨리스	
2020–2021	Delayed Justice	날아라 개천용	
2021	Penthouse 2	펜트하우스 2	
2021	Taxi Driver	모범택시	
2021	One the Woman	원 더 우먼	
2021–2022	Now, We Are Breaking Up	지금, 헤어지는 중입니다	
2022	Through the Darkness	악의 마음을 읽는 자들	
2022	Again My Life	어게인 마이 라이프	
2022	Why Her	왜 오수재인가	
2022	Today's Webtoon	오늘의 웹툰	
2022	One Dollar Lawyer	천원짜리 변호사	
2022	The First Responders	소방서 옆 경찰서	
2023	Payback: Money and Power	법쩐	
2023	Taxi Driver 2	모범택시 2	
2023	Dr. Romantic 3	낭만닥터 김사부 3	
2023	Revenant	악귀	
2023	The First Responders 2	소방서 옆 경찰서 2	
2023	The Escape of the Seven	7인의 탈출	
2023–2024	My Demon	마이데몬	
2024	Flex X Cop	재벌X형사	
2024	The Escape of the Seven: Resurrection	7인의 탈출 2	
2024	Connection	커넥션	
2024	Good Partner	굿파트너	
2024	The Judge from Hell	지옥에서 온 판사	
2024	The Fiery Priest 2	열혈사제2	
2025	Love Scout	나의 완벽한 비서	
2025	Buried Hearts	보물섬	
2025	Our Movie	우리 영화	
2025	The Winning Try	트라이:우리는 기적이 된다	
2025	Queen Mantis	사마귀	
2025	Would You Marry Me?	우주메리미	
2025–2026	Taxi Driver 3	모범택시 3	
2026	No Tail to Tell	오늘부터 인간입니다만	
2026	Phantom Lawyer	신이랑 법률사무소	
2026	My Royal Nemesis	멋진 신세계	
2026	Agent Kim Reactivated	김부장	
2026	Flex X Cop 2	재벌X형사 2	
2026	Doctor X: Mafia in White	닥터X: 하얀 마피아의 시대	
2026	Good Partner 2	굿파트너 2	

==== Friday ====
Year	English title	Korean title
2004–2005	Wives on Strike	아내의 반란
2005	Love and Sympathy	사랑공감
2005	Woman Above Flower	꽃보다 여자
2005	I Love You, My Enemy	사랑한다 웬수야
2005	Diamond Tears	다이아몬드의 눈물
2005–2006	That Woman	그 여자
2006	One Day Suddenly	어느 날 갑자기
2006	I'll Go With You	나도야 간다
2006	My Lovely Fool	내 사랑 못난이
2006–2007	My Love	마이 러브
2007	Salt Doll	소금인형
2007	Oh Lovers	연인이여
2007	Snow in August	8월에 내리는 눈
2007	Fly High	날아오르다
2007–2008	Thirty Thousand Miles in Search of My Son	아들 찾아 삼만리
2008	Bicheonmu	비천무
2008	Why Did You Come to My House	우리집에 왜 왔니
2008	My Sweet Seoul	달콤한 나의 도시
2008	The Scale of Providence	신의 저울
2011	The Musical	더 뮤지컬
2021	Penthouse 3	펜트하우스 3

=== Saturday–Sunday ===
==== Weekend Drama Theater ====
Year	English title	Korean title
1991–1992	Do You Know Eun Ha-su	은하수를 아시나요
1992	A Love Without Fear	두려움 없는 사랑
1992–1993	Ambitions on Sand	모래위의 욕망
1993	To Live	산다는 것은
1993–1994	Love and Work	일과 사랑
1994	Scent of Love	사랑의 향기
1994–1995	How This Woman Lives	이 여자가 사는 법
1995	Aunt Ock	옥이 이모
1996	Wealthy Yu-chun	부자유친
1996	Beginning of Happiness	행복의 시작
1997	Palace of Dreams	꿈의 궁전
1997	Woman Next Door	이웃집 여자
1997	Young	새끼
1997–1998	Beautiful Crime	아름다운 죄
1998	I Love You, I Love You	사랑해 사랑해
1998	Romance	로맨스
1998–1999	Letters Written on a Cloudy Day	흐린날에 쓴 편지
1999	Young Sun	젊은 태양
1999	Wave	파도
2000	Wang-rung's Land	왕룽의 대지
2000	Virtue	덕이
2001	I Still Love You	그래도 사랑해
2001	Father and Son	아버지와 아들
2001–2002	Splendid Days	화려한 시절
2002	That Woman Catches People	그 여자 사람잡네
2002–2003	Like a Flowing River	흐르는 강물처럼
2003	Escape From Unemployment	백수탈출
2003	South of the Sun	태양의 남쪽
2003–2004	Long Live Love	애정만세
2004	Little Women	작은 아씨들
2004–2005	Toji, the Land	토지
2005	That Summer's Typhoon	그 여름의 태풍
2005–2006	Dear Heaven	하늘이시여
2006–2007	Yeon Gaesomun	연개소문
2007–2008	Golden Bride	황금신부
2008	I Am Happy	행복합니다
2008–2009	Glass Castle	유리의 성
2009	Can Anyone Love	사랑은 아무나 하나
2009–2010	Loving You a Thousand Times	천만번 사랑해
2010	Definitely Neighbors	이웃집 웬수
2010–2011	Smile, Mom	웃어요, 엄마
2011	My Love By My Side	내사랑 내곁에
2011–2012	If Tomorrow Comes	내일이 오면
2012	Tasty Life	맛있는 인생
2012–2013	My Lover, Madame Butterfly	내 사랑 나비부인
2013	Wonderful Mama	원더풀 마마
2013–2014	Passionate Love	열애
2014	Glorious Day	기분 좋은 날
2014–2015	Modern Farmer	모던파머
2015	The Family is Coming	떴다! 패밀리

==== Weekend dramas ====
- Yeah, That's How It Is (그래, 그런거야; 2016)
- Our Gap-soon (우리 갑순이; 2016–2017)

==== Weekend special project dramas ====
Year	English title	Korean title
1995	Korea Gate	코리아게이트
1996	Im Kkeokjeong	임꺽정
1997	Beautiful Her	아름다운 그녀
1998	Three Kim Generation	삼김시대
2002	Glass Slippers	유리구두
2002	Rival	라이벌
2002–2003	Great Ambition	대망
2003	Into the Sun	태양속으로
2003	Thousand Years of Love	천년지애
2003	Screen	스크린
2003	First Love	첫사랑
2003	Perfect Love	완전한 사랑
2004	Something Happened in Bali	발리에서 생긴 일
2004	Into The Storm	폭풍 속으로
2004	Lovers in Paris	파리의 연인
2004	Magic	매직
2004–2005	Save the Last Dance for Me	마지막 춤은 나와 함께
2005	Spring Day	봄날
2005	Green Rose	그린 로즈
2005	Only You	온리 유
2005	Let's Go to the Beach	해변으로 가요
2005	Lovers in Prague	프라하의 연인
2005–2006	Marrying a Millionaire	백만장자와 결혼하기
2006	Love and Ambition	사랑과 야망
2006–2007	Queen of Games	게임의 여왕
2007	Crazy in Love	사랑에 미치다
2007	Blue Fish	푸른 물고기
2007	Flawed Couple	불량 커플
2007	Get Karl! Oh Soo-jung	칼잡이 오수정
2007–2008	First Wives' Club	조강지처 클럽
2008–2009	Family's Honor	가문의 영광
2009	Brilliant Legacy	찬란한 유산
2009	Style	스타일
2009–2010	Smile, You	그대, 웃어요
2010	Life Is Beautiful	인생은 아름다워
2010–2011	Secret Garden	시크릿 가든
2011	New Tales of Gisaeng	신기생뎐
2011	Scent of a Woman	여인의 향기
2011–2012	Living in Style	폼나게 살거야
2012	Dummy Mommy	바보엄마
2012	A Gentleman's Dignity	신사의 품격
2012	Five Fingers	다섯손가락
2012–2013	Cheongdam-dong Alice	청담동 앨리스
2013	Incarnation of Money	돈의 화신
2013	The Secret of Birth	출생의 비밀
2013	Goddess of Marriage	결혼의 여신
2013–2014	Thrice Married Woman	세번 결혼하는 여자
2014	Angel Eyes	엔젤아이즈
2014	Endless Love	끝없는 사랑
2014–2015	Birth of a Beauty	미녀의 탄생
2015	My Heart Twinkle Twinkle	내 마음 반짝반짝
2015	Divorce Lawyer in Love	이혼변호사는 연애 중
2015	The Time We Were Not in Love	너를 사랑한 시간
2015–2016	I Have a Lover	애인 있어요
2016	Mrs. Cop 2	미세스 캅 2
2016	Beautiful Gong Shim	미녀 공심이
2016	Second to Last Love	끝에서 두번째 사랑
2016	Gogh, The Starry Night	고호의 별이 빛나는 밤에
2017	Band of Sisters	언니는 살아있다
2017–2018	Bravo My Life	브라보 마이 라이프
2018	Nice Witch	착한마녀전
2018	Secret Mother	시크릿 마더
2018	Let Me Introduce Her	그녀로 말할 것 같으면
2018	Ms. Ma, Nemesis	미스 마, 복수의 여신
2018–2019	Fates & Furies	운명과 분노

==== Saturday night drama ====
- Late Night Restaurant (심야식당; 2015)

==== Sunday night drama ====
- Let Me Be Your Knight (너의 밤이 되어줄게; 2021)

=== Monday–Friday ===
==== Morning soap opera ====
Year	English title	Korean title
1991–1992	Door of Solitude	고독의 문
1992	Winter Bird	겨울새
1992–1993	Autumn Woman	가을 여자
1993	Conditions of Love	사랑의 조건
1993–1994	Woman's Mirror (TV series)	여자의 거울
1994	I Want to Be Happy	행복하고 싶어요
1994	The Woman in the Matchbox	성냥갑 속의 여자
1994–1995	That Window	그대의 창
1995	Your Voice (TV series)	그대 목소리
1995–1996	Elegy	엘레지
1996	Encounter	만남
1996–1997	Sometimes Like Strangers	때로는 타인처럼
1997	Song Just Once	단 한번의 노래
1997–1998	Only You	당신 뿐인데
1998	Spring After Winter	겨울 지나고 봄
1998	Mom's Daughter	엄마의 딸
1998	Hug	포옹
1999	Now Is the Time to Love	지금은 사랑할 때
1999	Her Choice	그녀의 선택
1999–2000	Cello	첼로
2000	Nice Man	착한 남자
2000	Love and Farewell	사랑과 이별
2000–2001	Pardon	용서
2001	Morning Without Parting	이별 없는 아침
2001–2002	Outing	외출
2002	Mom's Song	엄마의 노래
2002–2003	Ice Flower (TV series)	얼음꽃
2003	Near to You	당신 곁으로
2003–2004	Garden of Eve	이브의 화원
2004	Proposal	청혼
2004–2005	Choice	선택
2005	Pearl Earring	진주 귀걸이
2005	Queen's Conditions	여왕의 조건
2005–2006	Wild Flower	들꽃
2006	I Want to Love	사랑하고 싶다
2006	Barefoot Love	맨발의 사랑
2006–2007	Love and Hate	사랑도 미움도
2007	Good Day to Love	사랑하기 좋은 날
2007–2008	Cannot Hate You	미워도 좋아
2008	Aquarius	물병자리
2008	Daughter in Law	며느리와 며느님
2008–2009	Innocent You	순결한 당신
2009	Green Coach	녹색마차
2009–2010	Don't Hesitate	망설이지마
2010	Daring Women	당돌한 여자
2010	You Don't Know Women	여자를 몰라
2011	War of the Roses	장미의 전쟁
2011	Miss Ajumma	미쓰 아줌마
2011–2012	Bride of the Sun	태양의 신부
2012	Welcome Rain to My Life	내 인생의 단비
2012–2013	Only Because It's You	너라서 좋아
2013	Your Lady	당신의 여자
2013–2014	Two Women's Room	두 여자의 방
2014	You're Only Mine	나만의 당신
2014–2015	Cheongdam-dong Scandal	청담동 스캔들
2015	Enchanting Neighbor	황홀한 이웃
2015	My Mother Is a Daughter-in-law	어머님은 내 며느리
2016	Marrying My Daughter Twice	내 사위의 여자
2016	The Love Is Coming	사랑이 오네요
2016–2017	I'm Sorry, But I Love You	아임쏘리 강남구
2017	Sweet Enemy	달콤한 원수
2017–2018	Happy Sisters	해피 시스터즈
2018	I Am the Mother Too	나도 엄마야
2018–2019	Gangnam Scandal	강남 스캔들
2019	Shady Mom-in-Law	수상한 장모
2019–2020	Want a Taste?	맛 좀 보실래요
2020	Mom Has an Affair	엄마가 바람났다
2020–2021	Phoenix 2020	불새 2020
2021	Amor Fati	아모르파티

==== Evening daily dramas ====
Year	English title	Korean title
1991–1992	Yusimcho	유심초
1991–1992	Love Anthem	사랑의 찬가
1996	The Bicycle Riding Woman	자전거를 타는 여자
1996–1997	Mom's Flag	엄마의 깃발
1997	Happiness in Our Heart	행복은 우리 가슴에
1997	Miari No. 1	미아리 일번지
1997–1998	Over the Horizon (TV series)	지평선 너머
1998	Seoul Tango	서울 탱고
1998	Seven Brides	7인의 신부
1998–1999	I Hate You, But It's Fine	미우나 고우나
1999	Promise	약속
1999–2000	Who Are You	당신은 누구시길래
2000–2001	I Want to Keep Seeing You	자꾸만 보고싶네
2001	Well Known Woman	소문난 여자
2001–2002	How This Couple Lives	이 부부가 사는 법
2002	Five Brothers and Sisters	오남매
2002–2003	Sunrise House	해 뜨는 집
2003	Lovers	연인
2003–2004	A Problem at My Younger Brother's House	흥부네 박터졌네
2004	Traveling Women	소풍가는 여자
2007–2008	That Woman Is Scary	그 여자가 무서워
2008	Aeja's Older Sister, Minja	애자 언니 민자
2008–2009	Temptation of Wife	아내의 유혹
2009	Two Wives	두 아내
2009–2010	Wife Returns	아내가 돌아왔다
2010	Three Sisters	세 자매
2010–2011	Pure Pumpkin Flower	호박꽃 순정
2011	While You Were Sleeping	당신이 잠든 사이
2011–2012	My Daughter the Flower	내 딸 꽃님이
2012	Still You	그래도 당신
2012–2013	The Birth of a Family	가족의 탄생
2013	Ugly Alert	못난이 주의보
2013–2014	One Well-Raised Daughter	잘키운 딸 하나
2014	Only Love	사랑만 할래
2015	Run, Jang-mi	달려라 장미
2015	The Return of Hwang Geum-bok	돌아온 황금복
2015–2016	The Three Witches	마녀의 성
2016	You Are a Gift	당신은 선물c
2016–2017	Bubbly Lovely	사랑은 방울방울

== Sitcoms ==
=== Youth sitcom ===
- How Do I Look? (나 어때; 1998–1999)
- March (행진; 1999–2000)
- Golbangi (골뱅이; 2000–2001)
- That's Perfect! (딱좋아!; 2001–2002)
- Let's Go (레츠고; 2002)
- Orange (오렌지; 2002)

=== Daily sitcom ===
- LA Arirang (LA아리랑; 1995–1996)
- Dad Is the Boss (아빠는 시장님; 1996–1997)
- OK Ranch (OK목장; 1997)
- Miss & Mister (미스 & 미스터; 1997)
- Soonpoong Clinic (순풍산부인과; 1998–2000)
- Why Can't We Stop Them (웬만해선 그들을 막을 수 없다; 2000–2002)
- Dae Bak Family (대박가족; 2002–2003)
- Honest Living (똑바로 살아라; 2002–2003)
- Apgujeong House (압구정 종갓집; 2003–2004)

=== Monday sitcom ===
- Super Family 2017 (초인가족 2017; 2017)
- Big Difference Korea
- Big Difference Korea #TheBeatFoesDown
- Current Time: The Spoof

=== Saturday sitcom ===
- Love is Live (사랑은 생방송; 1993–1994)
- New York Story (뉴욕스토리; 1997–1998)
- Money.com (돈.com; 2000)

=== Sunday sitcom ===
- Sergeant Oh (오경장; 1993–1994)
- Girls' High School Days (2001–2002; 여고시절)

=== Couple sitcom ===
- Honey Honey (허니허니; 2001–2002)

=== Weekly sitcom ===
- Detective (형사; 2003–2004)
- You're Not Alone (혼자가 아니야; 2004–2005)
- Cute or Crazy (귀엽거나 미치거나; 2005)
- Mackerel Run (달려라 고등어; 2007)
- Welcome to the Show (웰컴 투 더 SHOW; 2011)
- Salamander Guru and The Shadows (도롱뇽도사와 그림자 조작단; 2012)

=== Weekend sitcom ===
- Professor Oh's Family (오박사네 사람들; 1993)

== Animation and movies ==
- Movie Express (영화특급; 1991–2011)
- SBS Cine Club (SBS 시네클럽)
- SBS Anigallery (SBS 애니갤러리; 2007–2015)
- Animaniacs (애니매니악스)
- Animaniacs: Wakko's Wish (애니매니악스 : Wakko의 소원) (subtitled)
- Access! Ani-world (접속! 애니월드; 2015–present)
- Carrusel (천사들의 합창)
- Sonic the Hedgehog (고슴도치 소닉)
- Demetan Croaker, The Boy Frog (개구리 왕눈이)
- Martian Successor Nadesico (기동전함 나데카)
- Teenage Mutant Ninja Turtles (거북이 특공대)
- Teenage Mutant Ninja Turtles 2 (거북이 특공대 Z)
- The Irresponsible Captain Tylor (캡틴 테일러)
- Tank Knights Fortress (포트리스)
- The Raspberry Times (라즈베리 타임즈)
- Science Ninja Team Gatchaman (독수리 오형제)
- Mirmo! (미르모 퐁퐁퐁)
- Bananas in Pyjamas (내 친구 바나바나)
- Futari wa Pretty Cure (빛의 전사 프리큐어)
- Origami Warriors (접지전사)
- Duel Masters (듀얼 마스터즈)
- Crayon Shin-chan (짱구는 못말려)
- Olympus Guardian (올림포스 가디언)
- W.I.T.C.H. (마법소녀 위치)
- Tom and Jerry (톰과 제리)
- Teen Titans (틴 타이탄)
- Top Blade (탑블레이드)
- Top Blade V (탑블레이드V)
- Super Korean (슈퍼 코리언)
- Speed Racer (달려라 번개호)
- Pocket Monsters (포켓몬스터)
- Tokyo Mew Mew (베리베리 뮤우뮤우, Berry Berry Mew Mew)
- Aqua Kids (아쿠아 키즈)
- Yu-Gi-Oh! (유희왕)
- Dragon Ball (드래곤볼)
- Mashin Hero Wataru (미래전사 드래곤 파이터)
- Ragnarok the Animation (마법신화 라그나로크)
- Giga Tribe (기가 트라이브)
- White Mind Dog (하얀마음 백구)
- Astro Boy (우주소년 아톰)
- Cybertron (은하영웅 사이버트론)
- Banga Banga Hamtori (방가방가 햄토리)
- Cardcaptor Cherry (카드캡터 체리)
- Animal Yokochō (두근두근 비밀친구)
- The Prince of Tennis (테니스의 왕자)
- Winx Friends (윙스 프렌즈)
- MapleStory (메이플스토리)
- Dooly the Little Dinosaur (아기공룡 둘리)
- My Friend Haechi (내 친구 해치)
- Zoobles (쥬블스)
- Scan2Go (스캔2고)
- Magi-Nation (마법의 별, 매지네이션)
- Hello Jadoo (안녕 자두야)
- Daily Mom (매일엄마)
- Pretty Rhythm: Dear My Future (꿈의 보석 프리즘스톤)
- Top Plate (최강! 탑플레이트)
- Dodgeball King Tonki (피구왕 통키)
- Victory's 20,000 Leagues in the Space (빛돌이 우주 2만리)
- The Powerpuff Girls (파워퍼프걸)
- Robot Trains (로봇트레인)
- Green Saver (그린세이버)

== Music, entertainment and variety shows ==
=== Current programs ===
Year	English title	Korean title
1993–present	Inkigayo	인기가요
1996–present	Good Morning	좋은 아침
1998–present	SBS Gayo Daejeon	SBS 가요대전
1999–present	Access! Movie World	접속! 무비월드
2010–present	Running Man	런닝맨
2016–present	My Little Old Boy	미운 우리 새끼
2017–present	Same Bed, Different Dreams 2: You Are My Destiny	동상이몽 2 - 너는 내 운명
2021–present	Dolsing Fourmen	신발 벗고 돌싱포맨

=== Former programs ===
==== 1990s ====
Former programs in 1990s
- Live TV songs 20 (생방송 TV 가요 20; 1993–1998)
- Ju Byung-jin Show (주병진쇼; 1993)
- Our Happy Saturday (기쁜 우리 토요일; 1994–2001)
- Good Friends (좋은 친구들; 1994–2003)
- Tonight's TV Entertainment (한밤의 TV연예; 1995–2016)
- Lee Hong-ryul Show (이홍렬 쇼; 1996–2001)
- Saturday Mystery Theater (토요미스테리 극장; 1997–1999)
- Lee Seung-yeon's Say Say Say (이승연의 세이세이세이; 1998)
- Kim Hye-soo Plus You (김혜수 플러스 유; 1998–2000)

==== 2000s ====
Former programs in 2000s
- Truth Game (진실게임; 1999–2008)
- 1000 Song Challenge (도전 1000곡; 2000–2014)
- Good Hunch Fun TV (좋은 예감 즐거운 TV; 2000–2001)
- Two Men Show (두 남자 쇼; 2000–2001)
- Nam Hee-suk's Unusual Night (남희석의 색다른 밤; 2000–2001)
- Music Enter (뮤직엔터; 2000–2001)
- Curiosity Paradise (호기심 천국; 2000–2002)
- Name of the Rose (장미의 이름; 2000–2002)
- Good Feeling Night (기분 좋은 밤; 2001)
- Park Su-hong & Park Kyung-lim's Beautiful Night (박수홍 박경림의 아름다운 밤; 2001–2002)
- Saturday is Fun (토요일은 즐거워; 2001–2002)
- Ultra Sunday Hurray (초특급 일요일 만세; 2001–2002)
- Game Show Fun World (게임쇼 즐거운 세상; 2001–2012)
- Countdown (카운트 다운; 2002)
- Shin Dong-yup & Nam Hee-suk's Man To Man (신동엽 남희석의 맨∥맨; 2002–2003)
- Shin Dong-yup & Kim Won-hee's Hey! Hey! Hey! (신동엽 김원희의 헤이!헤이!헤이!; 2002–2003)
- Comedy Town (코미디 타운; 2002–2003)
- Fun TV Heaven (재미있는 TV천국; 2002–2007)
- Beautiful Sunday (뷰티풀 선데이; 2002–2004)
- Open Your Heart (가슴을 열어라; 2003)
- Fort Boyard (보야르 원정대; 2003)
- TV Scholarship Committee (TV 장학회; 2003–2004)
- Ya Sim Man Man (야심만만; 2003–2008)
- Decision Taste vs. Taste (결정 맛대맛; 2003–2007)
- Survival Lance and Shield (서바이벌 창과 방패; 2003–2004)
- SBS Gayo Show (SBS 가요쇼; 2003–2004)
- Choi Su-jong Show (최수종 쇼; 2003–2004)
- People Looking For Laughter (웃음을 찾는 사람들; 2003–2010, 2013–2017)
- Real Situation Saturday (실제상황 토요일; 2003–2007)
- Lee Kyung-kyu's Good Time (이경규의 굿타임; 2004)
- Romance Concert (낭만 콘서트; 2004–2005)
- I Am (아이엠; 2004–2005)
- Cultwo's Star Coach (컬투의 스타 코치; 2004–2005)
- Kim Yong-man & Shin Dong-yup's Favorites (김용만 신동엽의 즐겨찾기; 2004–2005)
- Good Sunday (일요일이 좋다; 2004–2017)
- Quiz Show Best Men and Women (퀴즈쇼 최강남녀; 2005)
- Challenge! High & Low (도전! 하이&로; 2005)
- Cheerful Brain Search (유쾌한 두뇌검색; 2005)
- Know How (비법 대공개; 2005–2006)
- Yes! No? (있다! 없다?; 2005–2009)
- Challenge Success Generation (도전 성공시대; 2005–2006)
- Kim Yoon-ah's Music Wave (김윤아의 뮤직웨이브; 2005–2006)
- Gag 1 (개그1; 2006)
- Music Space (음악공간; 2006–2008)
- Hey Hey Hey Season 2 (헤이헤이헤이 시즌2; 2006–2007)
- Super! Viking (슈퍼! 바이킹; 2006–2007)
- Discover! TV Big Dictionary (발굴! TV대사전; 2007–2008)
- Burst! Mental Concentration (작렬! 정신통일; 2007)
- Lee Kyung-kyu & Kim Yong-man's Line Up (이경규 김용만의 라인업; 2007–2008)
- Quiz! Hexagon (퀴즈! 육감대결; 2007–2010)
- Star King (놀라운 대회 스타킹; 2007–2016)
- Battle 8 vs. 1 (대결 8대1; 2008)
- Mystery Hunters (미스터리 특공대; 2008)
- TV Oasis (TV오아시스; 2008)
- The Star Show (더 스타쇼; 2008)
- Ya Sim Man Man 2 (야심만만 2; 2008–2009)
- Intimate Note (절친 노트; 2008–2010)
- Kim Jung-eun's Chocolate (김정은의 초콜릿; 2008–2011)
- Identity (공통점을 찾아라; 2008)
- Because I Like You (좋아서; 2008–2009)
- Love Generation (연애시대; 2008–2009)
- Show! Korea Sings (쇼! 노래하는 대한민국; 2009)
- Battle! Star Chef (대결! 스타셰프; 2009)
- Star Junior Show (스타 주니어쇼 붕어빵; 2009–2015)
- Honey: The Lifetime Companion (자기야; 2009–2018)
- Strong Heart (강심장; 2009–2013)
- It's Okay You (괜찮아 유; 2009–2010)

==== 2010s ====
Former programs in 2010s
- Ha-ha Mong Show (하하몽쇼; 2010)
- Tasty Invitation (맛있는 초대; 2010)
- Night After Night (밤이면 밤마다; 2010–2011)
- Real Korean Taste (진한맛; 2010–2011)
- Fun Quiz Club (재미있는 퀴즈클럽; 2011)
- Miracle Audition (기적의 오디션; 2011)
- Healing Camp (힐링캠프; 2011–2016)
- Quiz Show Multiply 9 (퀴즈쇼 곱하기 9; 2011–2012)
- Law of the Jungle (정글의 법칙; 2011–2021)
- Gag Tonight (개그 투나잇; 2011–2013)
- K-pop Star (K팝 스타; 2011–2017)
- 100 Million Quiz Show (세대공감 1억 퀴즈쇼; 2012)
- Jung Jae-hyung & Lee Hyori's You and I (정재형 이효리의 유&아이; 2012)
- Go Show (고쇼; 2012)
- SBS Knowledge Sharing Concert – I Love People (SBS 지식나눔 콘서트 – 아이러브 인; 2012–2014)
- E-King (전파왕; 2012–2013)
- Hwasin: Controller of the Heart (화신 – 마음을 지배하는 자; 2013)
- Barefooted Friends (맨발의 친구들; 2013)
- Thank You (땡큐; 2013)
- Friday is Chatter (금요일엔 수다다; 2013–2014)
- Survival Audition I'm Super Model (서바이벌 오디션 아임 슈퍼모델; 2013)
- World Challenge – We Are Coming (월드 챌린지 – 우리가 간다; 2013–2014)
- Heart Beats (심장이 뛴다; 2013–2014)
- Fashion King Korea (패션왕 코리아; 2013–2014)
- Oh! My Baby (오! 마이 베이비; 2014–2016)
- The Law of the City (도시의 법칙; 2014)
- Magic Eye (매직아이; 2014)
- Roommate (룸메이트; 2014–2015)
- Cook King Korea (쿡킹 코리아; 2014–2015)
- Eco Village – Happy Family! (에코빌리지 즐거운 家!; 2014–2015)
- Take Care of My Dad (아빠를 부탁해; 2015)
- Happy Today (해피 투데이; 2015)
- Some Guys, Some Girls (썸남썸녀; 2015)
- The Fab Singles (불타는 청춘; 2015–2021)
- Same Bed, Different Dreams (동상이몽 괜찮아 괜찮아; 2015–2016)
- The People's Dining Court (백종원의 3대 천왕; 2015–2017)
- The Fist of Fighting Spirit (주먹쥐고 소림사; 2015)
- New Star King (New 스타킹; 2015–2016)
- Baek Jong-won's Top 3 Chef King (2015–2017)
- Vocal wars: Voice of God (보컬 전쟁 : 신의 목소리; 2016)
- Fantastic Duo (판타스틱 듀오; 2016)
- Flower Crew (꽃놀이패; 2016–2017)
- Scene Stealer: Script Scholarship (씬스틸러 – 드라마 전쟁; 2016–2017)
- E-News Exclusive (본격 연예 한밤; 2016–2020)
- Game Show Yoo Hee Nak Rak (게임쇼 유희낙락; 2016–2018)
- Fantastic Duo #2 (판타스틱 듀오 시즌2; 2017)
- Paik Jong-won's Food Truck (백종원의 푸드트럭; 2017)
- Style Follow (스타일 팔로우; 2017)
- Master in the House (집사부일체; 2017–2023)
- Baek Jong-won's Alley Restaurant (백종원의 골목식당; 2018–2021)
- Romance Package (2018)
- Have a good meal (폼나게 먹자; 2018)
- Reckless but Happy (2018)
- Little Forest (리틀포레스트; 2019)
- Wook Talk (이동욱은 토크가 하고싶어서; 2019–2020)
- Delicious Rendezvous (맛남의 광장; 2019–2021)

==== 2020s ====
Former programs in 2020s
- K-Trot in Town (트롯신이 떴다; 2020)
- Tiki-taCAR (티키타카; 2021)
- Loud (라우드; 2021)
- Golf Battle: Birdie Buddies (편먹고 공치리; 2021)
- The Soldiers (더솔져스; 2021)
- Fantastic Family-DNA Singer (판타스틱 팸일리; 2022)
- Circle House (써클 하우스; 2022)
- Universe Ticket (유니버스 티켓; 2024)

== News and current affairs ==
- Morning Wide (모닝와이드, breakfast news & talk show; 10 December 1991 – present)
- SBS News at 10.10 (SBS 뉴스 (1010), late morning news; 1 December 2008 – present)
- Current Time Korea (1 November 2021, an adaptation of the Current Time TV franchise)
- SBS Economy and Life (SBS 생활경제; lifestyle & financial news; 5 October 2009 – 2014)
- SBS 12 News (SBS 12 뉴스, midday news; 5 October 2009 – present)
- News Briefing (주영진의 뉴스브리핑, daytime recent issue talk, 2 Jan 2017 – present)
- SBS O News (SBS 오 뉴스, early evening news; 2 January 2017 – present)
- SBS Eight O'Clock News (SBS 8 뉴스, main news; 9 December 1991 – present)
- SBS Sports News (SBS 스포츠뉴스, sports news; 9 December 1991 – present)
- SBS Nightline (SBS 나이트라인, late night news; 24 October 1994 – present)

== Society, culture and education ==
=== Current programs ===
Year	English title	Korean title
1992–present	Unanswered Questions	그것이 알고 싶다 (1992–1995, 1996–present)
1993–present	Open TV The Viewers' World	열린 TV 시청자 세상
1998–present	What on Earth!	순간포착 세상에 이런일이
2001–present	TV Animal Farm	TV 동물농장
2001–present	Water is Life	물은 생명이다
2003–present	The World's Most Beautiful Trip	세상에서 가장 아름다운 여행
2003–present	Live Today	생방송 투데이
2004–present	Culture Weekly	문화가중계
2005–present	Little Big Masters	생활의 달인
2005–present	SBS Special	SBS 스페셜
2008–present	Network Scene	네트워크 현장! 고향이 보인다
2009–present	Y-Story	궁금한 이야기 Y
2009–present	Sunday Special Documentary	일요 특선 다큐멘터리
2010–present	Childhood Inquiry Life	꾸러기 탐구생활
2012–present	Network Choice	네트워크 특선
2014–present	SBS Newstory	SBS 뉴스토리
2015–present	Finding Genius	영재발굴단
2016–present	Men in Black Box	맨 인 블랙박스
2017–present	Worldwide Tasty Lesson	요리조리 맛있는 수업

=== Former programs ===
==== 2000s ====
Former programs in 2000s
- How To Eat and Live Well (잘먹고 잘사는 법; 2002–2016)
- SBS Current Affairs Debate (SBS 토론공감; 2004–2013)
- SOS 24 (긴급출동 SOS 24; 2005–2011)
- Our Children Have Changed (우리 아이가 달라졌어요; 2005–2015)
- Hundred-Year-Old Health Generation (백세 건강시대; 2007–2014)
- Crayon of My Heart (내 마음의 크레파스; 2008–2016)

==== 2010s ====
Former programs in 2010s
- SBS Culture Club (SBS 컬처클럽; 2010–2017)
- In Depth 21 (현장 21; 2011–2014)
- Partner (짝; 2011–2014)
- Skills of Travel (여행의 기술; 2012)
- Human Documentary into Persons (휴먼다큐 사람속으로; 2012–2013)
- SBS Debates Empathy (SBS 토론 공감; 2013)
- Discovery of Travel (여행의 발견; 2013)
- Issue Inside (SBS 이슈 인사이드; 2013–2015)
- My Sweet Town (달콤한 나의 도시; 2014)
- 3PM, News Briefing (3시, 뉴스브리핑; 2015–2016)
- Founding Star (창업스타; 2015)

== Sports ==
- FIFA World Cup

== See also ==
- List of programs broadcast by Arirang TV
- List of programs broadcast by the Korean Broadcasting System
- List of programs broadcast by MBC TV
- List of programs broadcast by tvN (South Korean TV channel)
- List of programs broadcast by JTBC
