= Ben Wells =

Ben Wells or Benjamin Wells may refer to:

- Ben Wells (actor) (born 1980), American actor
- Ben Wells (cricketer)
- Ben Wells (gridiron football) (born 1989), American gridiron football player
- Ben Wells (footballer, born 1988), English footballer
- Ben Wells (footballer, born 2000), English footballer
- Ben Wells (musician), guitarist for American Southern-rock band Black Stone Cherry
- Ben Wells (swimmer) from Papua New Guinea, who swam at the 2003 South Pacific Games
- Benjamin W. Wells (1856–1923), American literary scholar
- Benjamin W. Wells (fire commissioner) (1860–1912), American government official and political activist
- Benjamin Wells, a U.S. tax collector who was a target of violence in the Whiskey Rebellion in 1793

== See also ==
- Bertram Whittier Wells aka B.W. Wells (1884–1978), American botanist and ecologist
