= Logos Film =

Korean film company

Logos Film Co., Ltd.
- Logos Film's logo
- Native name: (주) 로고스 필름
- Industry: Entertainment and media production
- Founded: November 29, 2000
- Founder: Lee Jang-soo
- Headquarters: 652, Sinsa-dong, Gangnam District, Seoul, South Korea
- Area served: South Korea
- Key people: Lee Jang-soo (CEO and TV series director)
- Products: Korean dramas
- Services: Production
- Parent: Kakao Entertainment (2020-present)
- Website: http://www.logosfilm.co.kr/

Logos Film Co., Ltd. (Korean: 로고스 필름) is a Korean drama production company, which operates as a subsidiary of Kakao Entertainment since it was acquired in July 2020. It was established on November 29, 2000, by Lee Jang-soo.

== List of works ==
=== TV series ===
Year	Title		Network	Ref.
Year	English	Original	Network	Ref.
2003	Screen	스크린	SBS TV	
2003	Stairway to Heaven	천국의 계단	SBS TV	
2004	Save Your Last Dance For Me	마지막 춤을 나와 함께	SBS TV	
2004	Love Story in Harvard	러브스토리 인 하버드	SBS TV	
2005	Summer Beach	해변으로 가요	SBS TV	
2005	Miracle of Love	사랑은 기적이 필요해	SBS TV	
2006	Tree of Heaven	천국의 나무	SBS TV	
2006	The Daring Sisters	발칙한 여자들	MBC TV	
2008	Little Mom Scandal	리틀맘 스캔들	Channel CGV	
2008	Last Scandal	내 생애 마지막 스캔들	MBC TV	
2009	Smile, You	그대, 웃어요	SBS TV	
2010	Road No. 1	로드 넘버원	MBC TV	
2011	Listen to My Heart	내 마음이 들리니?	MBC TV	
2011	Come, Come, Absolutely Come	왔어 왔어 제대로 왔어	MBN	
2011	Color of Woman	컬러 오브 우먼	Channel A	
2011	Heavenly Garden 'Gombaeryoung'	천상의 화원 곰배령	Channel A	
2012	Happy Ending	해피 엔딩	JTBC	
2012	My Husband Got a Family	넝쿨째 굴러온 당신	KBS2	
2013	Her Legend	그녀의 신화	JTBC	
2013	Good Doctor	굿 닥터	KBS2	
2014	Glorious Day	기분 좋은날	SBS TV	
2015	Remember	리멤버 – 아들의 전쟁	SBS TV	
2016	My Fair Lady	오 마이 금비	KBS2	
2017	Good Manager	김과장	KBS2	
2018	Cross	크로스	tvN	
2018	Lawless Lawyer	무법 변호사	tvN	
2019	Miss Lee	청일전자 미쓰리	tvN	
2019	Catch the Ghost	유령을 잡아라	tvN	
2021	Vincenzo	빈센조	tvN	
2021	Police University	경찰수업	KBS2	
2022	Military Prosecutor Doberman	군검사 도베르만	tvN	
2025	You and Everything Else	은중과 상연	Netflix	

=== Theater plays ===
Year	Title	
Year	English	Original
2013	Urgent Sale! Happy Apartment No. 1004	급매! 행복아파트 1004호

== Managed people ==
=== Actors ===
- Yoo Tae-woong (a/k/a Mark Yuu)
- Kim Tae-hoon
- Woo Jiwoo
- Bae Sang kyu

=== Writers ===
- Yoon Hyun-ho
- Yoo Yeong-joo
- Kim Myo-jin
- Shim Nam-seon
- Jeong Da-yeon
- Lee Myeong-jin
- Moon Su-jeong
- Jo Seung-beom, Han Ji-hye
- Lee Eun-yeong
- Kim Geun-ra, Yoon Yeong-ho
- Taesani
- Choi Chang-yeol

=== Directors ===
- Cho Kyu-Jang
- Ko Bong-su
- Na Su-ji
- Jin Chang-gyu
