= List of programs broadcast by Arirang TV =

The following is a list of television programs formerly or currently broadcast by Arirang TV.

== # ==
- #KOREA 4.0 - past
- #Stylecast - past
- #Stylecast 2017 - past
- 100 Icons of Korean Culture - past
- 21st Century - past
- 1DAY 1KOREA - current
- 1DAY 1FILM K-CINEFLEX - past
- The 3S - past
- 4 Angles - past

== A ==
- A Plus - past
- Aerial Korea - past
- Affairs of the Heart - past
- After 10 - past
- After School Club - current
- Ancestral Legacies - past
- Apple Tree - past
- Architecture 101 - past
- Arirang Arabic News - past
- Arirang Bulletin - past
- Arirang Cafe - past
- Arirang News - current
- Arirang News Break - past
- Arirang Odyssey: The Music - past
- Arirang Odyssey: The Story - past
- Arirang Prime - past
- Arirang Special - current
- Arirang Sports - past
- Arirang Sports M - past
- Arirang Today - past
- Arirang Today World Edition - past
- ArTravel - past
- ArTravel 2 - past
- Arts Avenue - past
- Asia and the Cities - past
- Asian Cuisine Tour - past

== B ==
- B CRUZE - past
- B CRUZE (Season 2) - past
- Battle Shinwa - past
- BBC WORLD HOUR - past
- Better together - past
- BEYOND - past
- Beyond Borders - past
- BizTech KOREA - past
- Biz Today - past
- Bizline - past
- BizSmart - past
- BizSmart With SMEs - past
- Bon Voyage - past
- Bravo! K-Scientist - current
- Bring It On - past
- Business Daily - past
- Buzz in Business - past

== C ==
- Cartoon Time - past
- Catchy Korea - past
- The Chamber - past
- Chef's Foodcation - past
- Celebrity Style Trip - past
- Cine-Lab - past
- City DNA - past
- Click! Digital Korea - past
- CODENAME BUSAN - past
- Company Close-Up - past
- Cooking Possible - past
- Coree Arirang - past
- CrossWorld People - past
- Cuisine Korea - past
- Cuisine Tour - past
- Culture Trove - past

== D ==
- Day Break - past
- DanstarGram On The Road - current
- Destination Korea - past
- Diplomacy Lounge - past
- DIPLOMAT TALKS - current
- The Diplomat - past
- Discover World - current
- Documentary World - past
- Dokdo - past
- Drama Platinum - past
- Drama Theater - past
- Dream It - past
- DW Hour - past
- Dynamic Korea - past

== E ==
- Early Edition 18:00 - past
- Economix Korea - past
- Edventure In Asia - past
- Edward's Live Kitchen - past
- Electropia - past
- Encore Documentary - past
- Encountering Tomorrow - past
- Embracing The World - past
- Emerging Innovators - past
- eSports - past
- Extreme Job - past
- Extraordinary You - past

== F ==
- Face to Face - past
- Fareway to Refreshing - past
- Festive Journey - past
- FDI Focus - past
- The Five Keys - past
- FOODelicious - past
- Foreign Correspondents - past
- Franceska - past

== G ==
- G-Korea 2011 - past
- G-Lounge - past
- Gangnam Insider's Picks - past
- GEO Korea - past
- Glimpse of Korea - past
- Global Business Report - past
- Global Families - past
- Global Football - past
- Global Tech - past
- Globetrotters - past
- Going Global - past
- The Grand Heritage - past
- The Great Aspiration - past
- Great Pathfinders - past
- GREEN ENERGY BIGBANG - past
- Guys & Girls - past

== H ==
- Hand in Hand - past
- Happy Station - past
- Hansik of the Day - past
- Health Finder - past
- Health For All - past
- Heart to Heart - past
- Hello My Teacher - past
- Hidden Attractions of Korea - past
- A History of East Asian Culinary Exchange - past
- History Trivia - past
- Homey Korean - past
- Host Family - past
- Hot Guy Police - past

== I ==
- I Love Korea - past
- I Love MMCA - past
- IDCF Special Cartoons - past
- I'm Live - current
- In Focus - past
- In Frame - past
- In Law's War - past
- In The Newsroom - past
- In Style - past
- In Style Plus - past
- In Your Eyes - past
- InfoScope - past
- The Innerview - past
- Innovation Korea - past
- InsideBiz - past
- Insight - past
- InStyle - past
- InStyle Plus - past
- Intelligence-High School Debate - past
- Invest Korea - past
- Islands to Love - current
- It City - past

== J ==
- Join Us Korea - past

== K ==
- K-BIZ - current
- K-Chat : Conversing in Korean - current
- K-Culture Elite - past
- K-OCEAN MARVELS - current
- K-Phile - past
- K-Populous - past
- K-stage 'PAN' - current
- Kidsland Wowow - past
- Kitchen Road - past
- Korea 101 - past
- Korea Confidential with Paul Schenk - past
- Korea in the Sky - past
- Korea in the Sky 2 - past
- Korea Now - past
- Korea on the Move - past
- Korea, on the New Horizon - past
- Korea on the Rise - past
- Korea Our Stories - past
- Korea This Week - past
- Korea Travelogue - past
- Korea Today - past
- Korea Top 10 - past
- Korea Wide - past
- Korea World Class - past
- Korea, The World's Best - past
- Korean Freakonomists - past
- Korean Inside - past
- Korean National Parks - past
- Korean News Update - past
- Korean Odyssey - past
- Koreans On The World Stage - past

== L ==
- Latin America's Wish - past
- The Legacy of Historical Architecture - past
- Legend Of Doctors - past
- Leisure All Out - past
- Let's Speak Korean - past
- Life Between Games - past
- Live. ON K-pop - past
- Live. ON(Indie-Trot) - past
- Live Music Concert Nanjang - past
- Love - past
- Love is Bambi - past
- Love or Nothing - past
- Lovers - past
- Love's Pinwheel - past
- Lush Life - past

== M ==
- Made in Korea - past
- Masterpiece of Generations - past
- Masterpieces of All Time - past
- Mechanics of Life - past
- Medical Center - past
- Medical Story - past
- Michel - past
- Midnight Cafe - past
- Money Matters - past
- Money Monster - past
- More Than Kimchi - past
- Movie World - past
- Museum Circuit - past
- Music Video - past
- My Funky Family - past
- My Little Kitchen - past
- My Love Bambi - past
- MYSTERY TRAVELERS - past

== N ==
- National Treasures - past
- Nature's Symphony - past
- Never a Dull Moment - current
- News Inside - past
- NEWS IN-DEPTH - current
- NEWSCENTER - renamed Arirang News Center - current
- NEWSMAKERS - current
- Newsline At Noon - past
- Newstellers - past
- The Next Korea Generation Y - past
- Nonstop - past
- Now In North Korea - past

== O ==
- Old Police Agency - past
- On the Agenda - past
- On the Road - past
- ONSTAGE K - past
- Open Arms - past
- OURS - past

== P ==
- A Path To Remember - past
- Peace Insight - current
- Peace & Prosperity - current
- Peninsula 24 - past
- Peninsula Inside - past
- Peninsula Scope - past
- People & People - past
- Perform Arts - past
- Perform Arts M - past
- PerformArts Reload - current
- Photo Essay - past
- PLAY11ST UP: FEEL LIKE 11 - current
- Poetic Korea - past
- Pops in Seoul - past
- Power Market - past
- Power Product - past
- Premium Collection - current
- Prime Time News - past
- A Prism - past
- Project-K - past
- Project K-Culture Elite - renamed K-Culture Elite
- promiSINGER - past
- Prosumer LAB 101 - past

== Q ==
- Quilt Your Korean Map - past
- Quiz Champion - past
- Quiz Show the Contenders - past
- Quiz Whiz Junior - past

== R ==
- RADIO' CLOCK - current
- Rank Korea - past
- Real Express - past
- Real Talk - past
- A Road to Peace - past
- The Road to Seoul - past
- The Roundtable - current
- Rock On Korea - past
- Rolling in K-Pop - past

== S ==
- The S.O.S. (The Standard of Survival) - past
- Scenery of Korea - past
- Screen Flash - past
- SECRET TOUR - current
- See What I See 3 - past
- Seeking Korean Treasures - past
- Semipermanent - past
- The Sensation - past
- Seoulscape - past
- Shaping the Economy - past
- Shooters - past
- Show Music Tank - past
- Showbiz Extra - renamed Showbiz Korea - past
- Showbiz World - past
- Showking M - past
- Simply K-Pop - current
- Sitcom - past
- Some Like it Hot - past
- Soul of an Artisan - past
- Sound & Motion - past
- Special Arirang - past
- Spirit of Korea - past
- Sports Express - past
- Spring Day - past
- SmartBiz Accelerators - current
- SMEs on the rise 2022 - past
- Star Lounge - current
- Star N The City - past
- STAR Real Story, "I Am" - past
- Starlit Promenade - past
- Stars' Road - past
- The Style Scout - past
- Superkids - past (archived on YouTUbe)
- Swap Asia - past
- Swap World - past

== T ==
- Tales of Hansik - past
- Talk Around - past
- Taste of Wisdom - past
- Taste Your Life - past
- Tasty Trail with Benjamin - past
- Technolyze - past
- That Day - past
- THE GLOBALISTS - current
- The Grand Heritage - current
- The Roundtable - current
- The Point - current
- This is the Wild - past
- Thumb Bear Kkomzi - past
- Timepriceless - past
- Touch Q - past
- Tour Avatar - past
- Tour vs Tour - past
- Trading Post - past
- Traditional Symbols - past
- TRAILS IN KOREA - past
- TRANSFORMATION IN ARCHITECTURE - past
- Travel Agency - past
- Travel Agency 2 - past
- Travel Space - past
- Travel Story - past
- Travel Track(Travel-Busking) - past
- Traveler's Korean - past
- Travelog - past
- Travelogue - past
- TripstarGram - current
- Two Chefs - past

== U ==
- Understanding Asia - past
- Uniquely Korean - past
- Upfront - past

== V ==
- Veiled Truth - past
- Viewfinder - past

== W ==
- W 24/7 - past
- The Water Bloom - past
- Wave K - past
- Wave Markers - past
- Way Station - past
- WEG Programs - past
- What's Coming - past
- What's On - past
- What's is - current
- Win Win - past
- Wind Up Korea - past
- Winning Choice - past
- The Wish Of The Earth - past
- Wiz & Biz Korea - past
- Woman Vs. Woman - past
- Working It - past
- World Best Restaurant - past
- World Experience - ATLAS - past
- World Sports - past
- World Tour in Korea - current
- World Wonders - past

== X ==
- X-Files - past

== Y ==
- Ya Tribe - past
- Youth Calls - past
- Yo! Welcome to Korea - past
