= Once Upon a Time in Seoul =

- South Korean poster
- Hangul: 소년은 울지 않는다
- RR: Sonyeoneun ulji anneunda
- MR: Sonyŏnŭn ulji annŭnda
- Directed by: Bae Hyoung-jun
- Written by: Han Ji-hoon; Kim Sang-don
- Produced by: Lee Eun; Son Seong-moon
- Starring: Lee Wan; Song Chang-eui
- Cinematography: Hwang Ki-seok
- Edited by: Park Kwang-il
- Music by: Lee Byung-hoon
- Production companies: MK Pictures; KD Media; Pancinema
- Distributed by: Studio 2.0
- Release date: November 6, 2008
- Running time: 98 minutes
- Country: South Korea
- Language: Korean
- Budget: US$4 million
- Box office: US$419,587

Once Upon a Time in Seoul (Korean: 소년은 울지 않는다; RR: Sonyeoneun ulji anneunda; lit. 'Boys Don't Cry') is a 2008 South Korean drama film starring Lee Wan and Song Chang-eui.

== Plot ==
1953, the Korean War has ended, but the fight for survival has just begun. Two 18-year-old boys, Tae-ho and Jong-du, live in a camp for orphaned boys, which is more of a concentration camp where everyone suffers from hunger, inhumane treatment and unbearable work conditions. But these two have a dream of a better tomorrow. Tae-ho is the one with wits and brains and Jong-du is the tough street fighter. Together they scheme to steal US Army supplies and recruit other boys to grow their business. But when they start to take business away from the local gangsters, their fight for survival turns into a war.

== Cast ==
- Lee Wan as Jong-du
- Song Chang-eui as Tae-ho
- Greena Park as Soon-nam
- Lee Ki-young as Do-cheol
- Ahn Gil-kang as Myeong-soo
- Jung Kyung-ho as Mouse
- Park Yeong-seo as Deok-bae
- Kang Yi-seok as Wonder child
- Cha Seung-yeol as Jae-gook
- Han Seong-jin as Sang-gook
- Joo Min-soo as Yeong-nam
- Eom Min-hyeok as Woo-sik
- Im Yeong-sik as Sang-il
- Lee Geon-moon as Yong-goo
- Kim Geon-ho as Mr. Jang
- Song Young-chang as Man-gi (cameo)
