= Lee Jung-gil =

South Korean actor

- Born: October 1, 1944 (age 82); Hwanghae, South Korea
- Other names: Lee Jung-kil; Lee Jeong-kil
- Education: Seorabol Art College - Theater and Film
- Occupation: Actor
- Years active: 1967–present

Korean name
- Hangul: 이정길
- Hanja: 李正吉
- RR: I Jeonggil
- MR: I Chŏnggil

Lee Jung-gil (born October 1, 1944) is a South Korean actor. After making his acting debut in 1967 in the stage play Sakhalinsk's The Sky and the Earth, Lee has had a prolific career in Korean television and film.

== Filmography ==
=== Television series ===
Television series
Year	Title	Role	Notes
2018	Switch	Choi Jung-pil	
2016	Memory		
2015	My Daughter, Geum Sa-wol		
2014	The Greatest Marriage		
2014	Cunning Single Lady		
2013	My Love from the Star	Lee Beom-joong	
2013	Melody of Love		
2013	Don't Look Back: The Legend of Orpheus		
2013	Iris II: New Generation		
2012	Cheer Up, Mr. Kim!		
2012	The Chaser		Cameo
2012	Angel's Choice		
2012	How Long I've Kissed		
2011	Scent of a Woman		
2011	Romance Town		
2011	Pit-a-pat, My Love		
2010	Athena: Goddess of War		
2010	You Don't Know Women		
2010	Dong Yi		
2009	Don't Hesitate		
2009	Iris		
2009	My Fair Lady		
2009	Partner		
2009	Boys Over Flowers		
2008	My Life's Golden Age		
2008	My Sweet Seoul		
2008	You Stole My Heart		
2007	Likeable or Not	Bong Man-soo	
2007	Flowers for My Life		
2007	Moon Hee		
2007	Behind the White Tower		
2006	Yeon Gaesomun		
2006	A Woman's Choice		
2006	Tree of Heaven		
2005	Jikji		
2005	Resurrection		
2005	The Secret Lovers		
2005	Pharmacist Kim's Daughters		
2005	5th Republic		
2005	Lovers in Prague		
2004	Human Market		
2004	April Kiss		
2004	Oh Feel Young		
2004	Toji, the Land		
2003	Desert Spring		
2003	One Million Roses		
2003	Pearl Necklace		
2003	Escape From Unemployment		
2003	Lovers		
2003	Land of Wine		
2002	Girl's High School Days		
2002	Rival		
2002	Man of the Sun, Lee Je-ma		
2002	Who's My Love		
2002	Sidestreet People		
2001	Man of Autumn		
2001	Purity		
2001	Four Sisters		
2001	Beautiful Days		
2001	Tender Hearts		
2000	The Full Sun		
2000	Juliet's Man		
2000	RNA		
2000	Say It with Your Eyes		
2000	Nice Man		
1999	I'm Still Loving You		
1999	Wave		
1998	The King and the Queen		
1998	Song of the Wind		
1998	Fascinate My Heart		
1998	Spring After Winter		
1998	The Era of the Three Kims		
1997	Passionate Love		
1997	Happy Morning		
1997	The Reason I Live		
1996	Landscaping with My Wife		
1996	Beginning of Happiness		
1996	Wealthy Yu-chun		
1996	Im Kkeok-jung		
1995	Korea Gate		
1995	Dazzling Dawn		
1995	Asphalt Man		
1994	What Have You Done Yet		
1994	Woman Burning Rice		
1994	Scent of Love		
1994	Goblin is Coming		
1993	3rd Republic		
1993	Happiness Without You		
1992	The Kingdom of Anger		
1992	Three Families Under One Roof		
1991	Happiness Dictionary		
1991	Eyes of Dawn		
1990	Betrayal of the Rose		
1989	2nd Republic		
1989	Happy Woman		
1989	For the Emperor		
1988	Our Town		
1988	The Last Icon		
1988	Three Ladies		
1987	Temptation		
1987	Last Train Guest		
1987	Roll of Thunder		
1987	Tomorrow and Tomorrow		
1987	The Face of a City		
1986	500 Years of Joseon - The Hoechun Gate		
1985	500 Years of Joseon - The Wind Orchid		
1984	You		
1984	I Miss You		
1983	Sunflower in Winter		
1983	The King of Chudong Palace		
1983	Women's History - Hwang Jin-yi		
1982	Naraya		
1982	Linger		
1981	Nocturne		
1981	Embrace		
1981	Annyeong haseyo		
1981	Royal Emissary		Ran from 1981 to 1984.
1981	1st Republic	Chang Taek-sang	
1981	New Mistress		
1980	Hongsa Lantern		
1980	Endpoint		
1980	Gan Yang Rok		
1980	Baebijangjeon		
1979	Spring Rain		
1979	Who Are You		
1979	Hope		
1979	Mom and Dad, I Like You		
1978	Blowing of the Wind		
1978	Hot Hand		
1978	Yeon-jae		
1978	Trap of Youth		
1978	Lady Jeong		
1976	Yearning for a Beauty		
1976	Tomorrow		
1975	By Ear		
1975	Class 3		
1974	Narcissus		

=== Film ===
Film
Year	Title	Role	Notes
2001	I Love You		
1989	Today's Woman		
1987	Affection		
1985	Madame Aema 3		
1977	The Popular Student		
1977	Towards the High Place		
1977	Good Bye, Sir!		
1977	Two Dreamers		
1977	The Youth		
1976	Prayer of a Girl		
1976	Farewell		
1976	I Must Live		
1975	Black Night		
1975	A Promise		
1975	Graduating School Girls		
1975	Anna's Will		
1975	Promise of the Flesh		

== Awards ==
- 1996 SBS Drama Awards: Top Excellence Award, Actor (Beginning of Happiness)
- 1989 16th Korea Broadcasting Awards: Best Actor (Our Town)
- 1982 18th Baeksang Arts Awards: Best TV Actor (Nocturne)
- 1979 15th Baeksang Arts Awards: Best TV Actor (Hot Hand)
- 1978 MBC Drama Awards: Outstanding Lead Actor, TV category (Hot Hand)
- 1976 MBC Drama Awards: Excellence Award, Actor
