= Catch the Ghost =

2019 South Korean television series

- Promotional poster
- Hangul: 유령을 잡아라
- Lit.: Catch Yuryeong (Note: The Korean word yuryeong (유령) serves a double meaning, simultaneously referring to "ghost" (the "Subway Ghost" killer) and the protagonist's name, Yoo Ryeong (유령).)
- RR: Yuryeongeul jabara
- MR: Yuryŏngŭl chabara
- Genre: Crime drama, Comedy
- Created by: Studio Dragon
- Written by: So Won; Lee Young-joo
- Directed by: Sin Yoon-seob
- Starring: Moon Geun-young; Kim Seon-ho
- Country of origin: South Korea
- Original language: Korean
- No. of episodes: 16

Production
- Producers: Lee Jang-soo; Choi Tae-young
- Camera setup: Single-camera
- Running time: 70 minutes
- Production company: Logos Film

Original release
- Network: tvN
- Release: October 21 – December 10, 2019

Catch the Ghost (Korean: 유령을 잡아라) is a 2019 South Korean television series starring Moon Geun-young and Kim Seon-ho. It aired on tvN from October 21 to December 10, 2019. It's the first korean drama that has Seoul Metropolitan Subway and Seoul Subway Police Department as central theme.

== Synopsis ==
Yoo Ryeong became a police investigator in order to find her missing twin sister. She was disappointed because the report of losing her sister was ignored by Ha Ma-ri, the police officer at that time. She thinks her sister was a victim of a serial murder by the Subway Ghost, and she does not always follow the rules as she strongly believes in justice. She partners with Go Ji-seok. On the night of her shift, with the help of Kim Woo-hyuk (a police officer at metro who is interested in her perseverance), she searches for her sister in a tunnel without her boss knowing.

Meanwhile, Go Ji-seok became famous because of his looks, and for being the best police officer in his class. He gets a promotion to be a metro police officer with his then girlfriend Ha Ma-ri, but circumstances force him to be a police officer at the subway, and that leads to his breakup with her. Unlike Yoo Ryeong, he strictly follows the rules and doesn't like trouble. His partnership with her thus leads to many problems for him. However, due to Yoo Ryeong's sincerity for every case, he begins to think about his past.

Later, Yoo Ryeong wants to separate from her partner because she doesn't want to always depend on him. Ji-seok is devastated, but he understands his partner's decision. Inspector Gong, Yoo Ryeong's new partner, is frustrated with her antics. Yoo Ryeong and Ji-seok work together to solve a kidnapping incident at the subway. After their collaboration, the two realize they miss each other. Knowing that Inspector Gong can no longer handle Yoo Ryeong, Ji-seok makes a deal to take back Yoo Ryeong as his partner without her knowing. They become partners again, to catch the Subway Ghost together with their team, and to search for Yoo Ryeong's sister.

== Cast ==
=== Main ===
- Moon Geun-young as twin sisters Yoo Ryeong and Yoo Jin (29 years old).

1. Yoo Ryeong: A passionate, impulsive rookie detective in Investigation Team 1 at the Wangsuri Subway Police Unit and Go Ji-seok's junior partner. Driven by a strong sense of justice, she frequently bends rules to catch criminals, leaving Ji-seok to handle the fallout. She joined the subway police to search for her missing twin sister, having memorized the exact spatial layouts of all 351 Seoul subway stations.
2. Yoo Jin: Yoo Ryeong's younger fraternal twin sister, who has autism and went missing in the subway two years ago. Her body was never found. Her case is related to a serial killer known as the "Subway Ghost."

- Kim Seon-ho as Go Ji-seok or Go Banjang (33 years old):

The head of Investigation Team 1 and a second-year detective at the Wangsuri Subway Police Unit. A top police academy graduate and former violent crimes detective with several martial arts skills, he transferred to the subway division and strictly follows procedure to maintain job stability while acting as the sole caregiver and financial provider for his mother, who suffers from dementia. He is paired as the senior partner to rookie detective Yoo Ryeong.

=== Supporting ===
Police officers

- Jo Jae-yoon as Lee Man-jin, as detective with 17-years experience at the Wangsuri Subway Police Unit.
- Ahn Seung-gyun as Kang Soo-ho, as detective with 1-year experience at the Wangsuri Subway Police Unit.
- Jung Yoo-jin as Ha Ma-ri, Regional Investigation Unit chief. The only daughter of Kim Hyeong-ja and Ji-seok ex girlfriend.
- Ki Do-hoon as Kim Woo-hyeok, detective of Team 1 Regional Investigation Unit.
- Lee Jun-hyeok as Chief Gong, head of Investigation Team 3 and detective with 13-years experience at the Dangsan Subway Police Unit.
- Song Ok-sook as Kim Hyeong-ja, Seoun Regional Police Chief. Ha Ma-ri's mother.
- Lee Jae-woo as Kim Hyung-soo, public relation officer of Seoun Regional Police Chief.

==== Hospital ====
- Nam Gi-ae as Han Ae-sim, Go Ji-seok's mother who suffers dementia.
- Kim Jung-young as Choi Kyung-hee, Ae-sim's caregiver.
- Song Sang-eun as Park Mi-hyun, Yoo Ryeong's friend who worked as a nurse at Dementia Hospital.

==== Others ====
- Lee Hong-nae as Goo Dong-man
- Kim Gun-woo as Kim Hee-Joon
- Lee Jae-woo as Hyung-soo
- Park Han-sol as Park Yoo-mi
- Lee Se-hee as "Madonna"
- Woo Jung-won as flyer lady.
- Baek Seo-yi as Ma Hye-jin (eps. 4-5)
- Oh Hee-joon as serial pervert

=== Special appearance ===
- Park Ho-san as Choi Do-chul (eps. 3-4)
- Han Ji-sang as Ko Do-nam
- Oh Dae-hwan as Kim Won-tae

== Production ==
=== Development ===
The series was produced by Logos Film and planned by Studio Dragon. The production team consist of director Shin Yun-seop, scripwiters So Won and Lee Young-ju, as well as art director Lee Kang-hyun. It's the first korean drama that has Seoul Metropolitan Subway and Seoul Subway Police Department (Note: The Jihacheolgyeongchaldae (지하철경찰대; 'Seoul Subway Police Department'), often shorten as Jigyeongdae (지경대) is headquartered at Wangshimi Station, Seoul.) as central theme. It follows Yoo Ryeong and Go Ji-seok, both police officer at Wangsuri Station as they catch serial killer "subway ghost". First revealed on February 27, 2019, the official Korean title Yuryeongeul Jabara (유령을 잡아라; 'Catch the Ghost') is a homophonic pun.

The drama's production team revealed that they spent a total of two years conducting research with the cooperation of the South Korean police Special Investigation Unit and consulted with a profiler for one year. The art direction team, led by Lee Kang-hyun, sought to recreate the scale of the subway system and subway polices' workplace environment. Constructed in Anseong, Gyeonggi Province, using actual blueprints and under the supervision of the Seoul Metropolitan Subway Corporation, the set featured a subway station, the office of Subway Police Department and a subway carriage identical with the one in operation, equipped with headlights, emergency exit doors, destination indicators, train number displays, and route maps. Rather than replicating the actual Seoul Metropolitan Subway map, the production used a simplified version showing only nine lines and transfer stations so viewers could easily follow it. A set at Wonbang in Paju, Gyeonggi Province, was used for the Regional Investigation Unit, where Ha Ma-ri and Kim Woo-hyuk work.

=== Casting ===
In February, it was reported that Moon Geun-young would return to television after a four-year hiatus as the female lead in Catch the Ghost. Her representatives said she was positively considering the offer. In April, Kim Seon-ho was reported to be taking the male lead role. In March, Moon and Kim were confirmed as subway police officers Yoo Ryeong and Go Ji-seok, respectively.

Moon opened up about the reason for choosing this project as her comeback work by saying, "I think I chose it without hesitation because it involves playing two roles and being a police officer." Kim said that he accepted the role because the genre was interesting, the romantic comedy forms the basis of the drama however it was mixed with other genres. He also intrigued by the playful title.

The remaining cast members were confirmed in July, alongside the release of photos from the first script reading. Present at the reading alongside the director, screenwriters, and main cast were Song Ok-sook (playing Kim Hyung-ja), Jo Jae-yoon (playing Lee Man-jin), Nam Ki-ae (playing Han Ae-shim), Ahn Seung-yoon (playing Kang Soo-ho), Song Sang-eun (playing Park Mi-hyun), Park Ho-san, and Han Ji-sang.

=== Filming ===
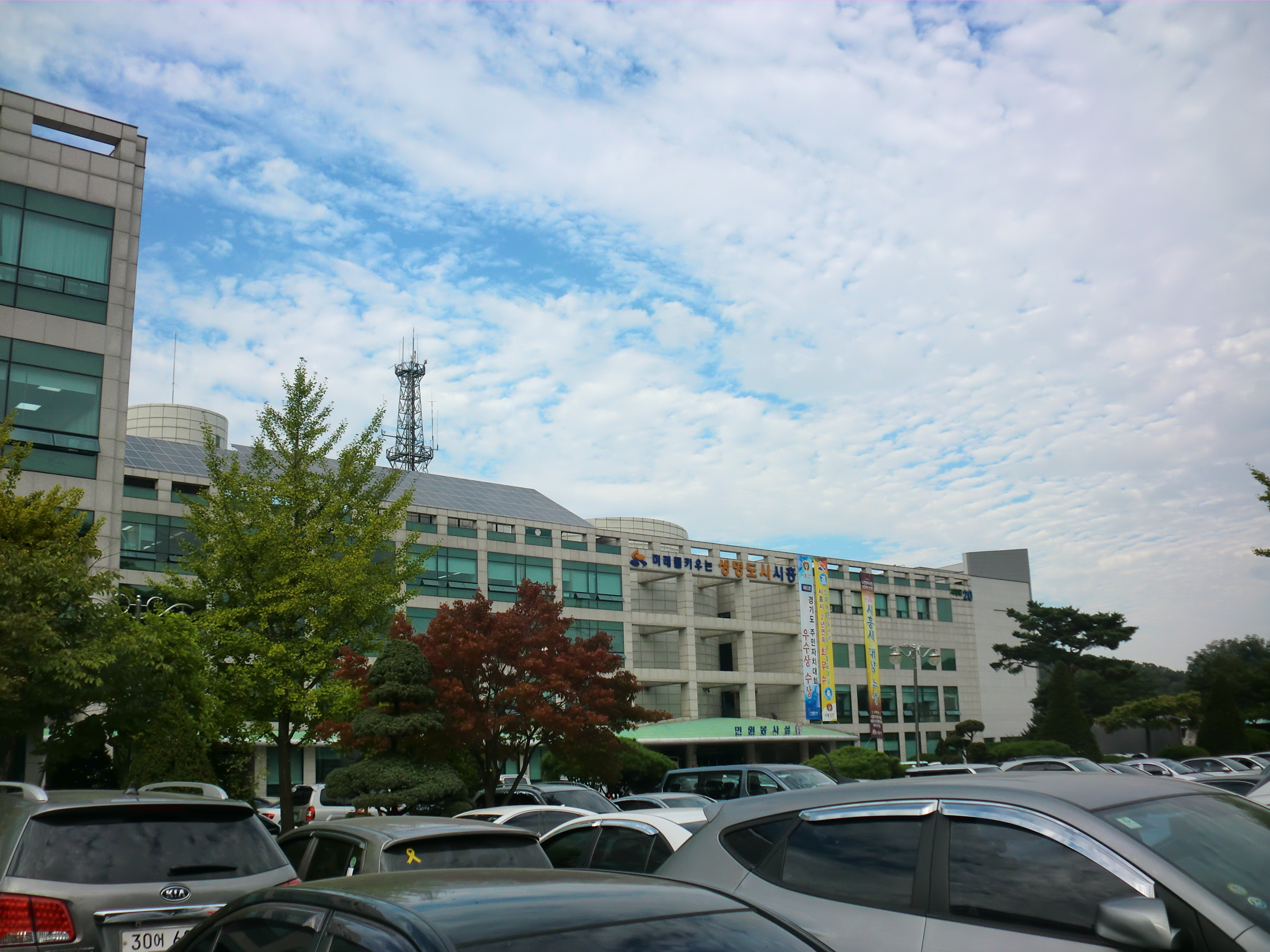
Siheung City Hall

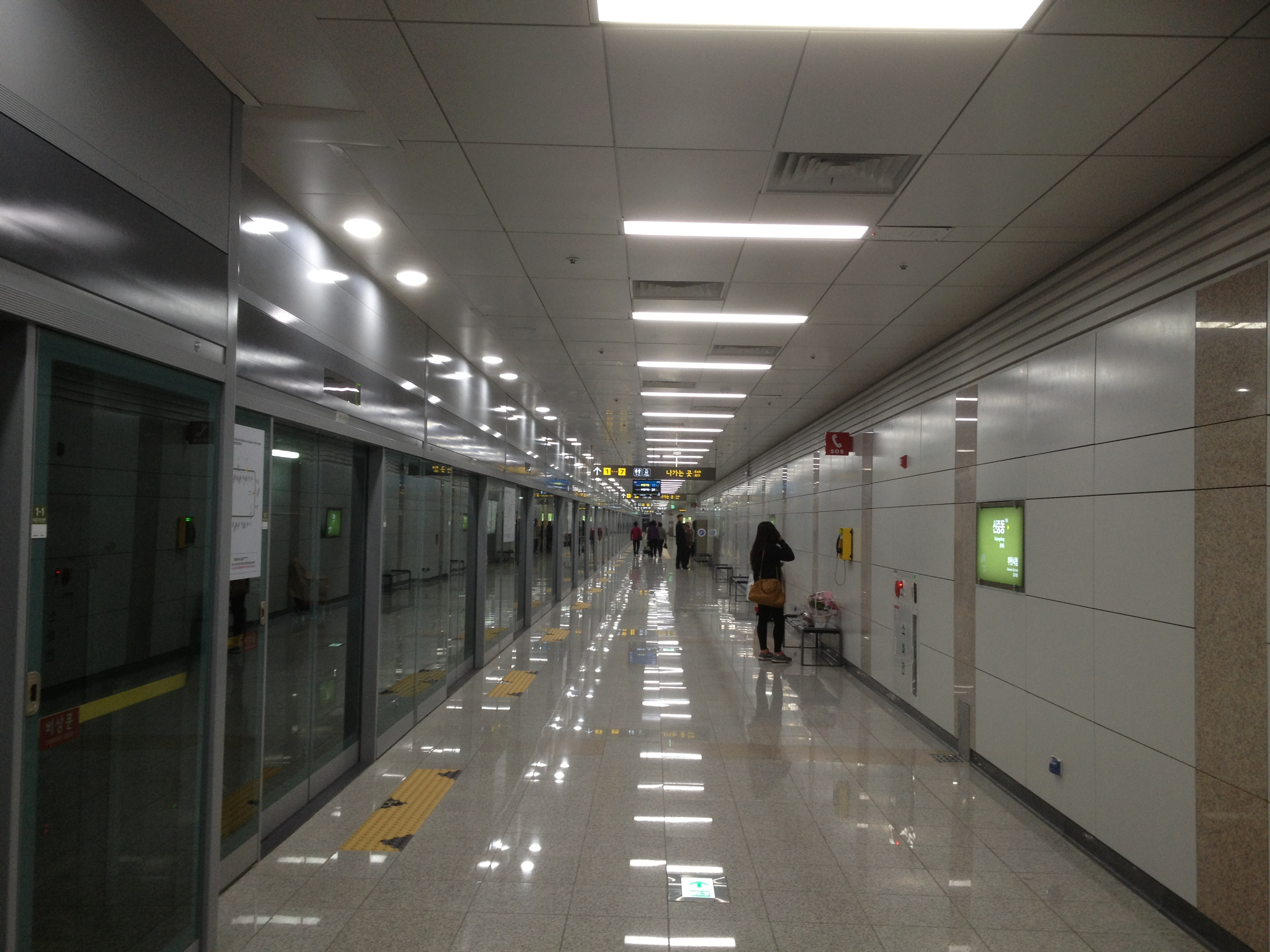
Sinjung-dong Station platform

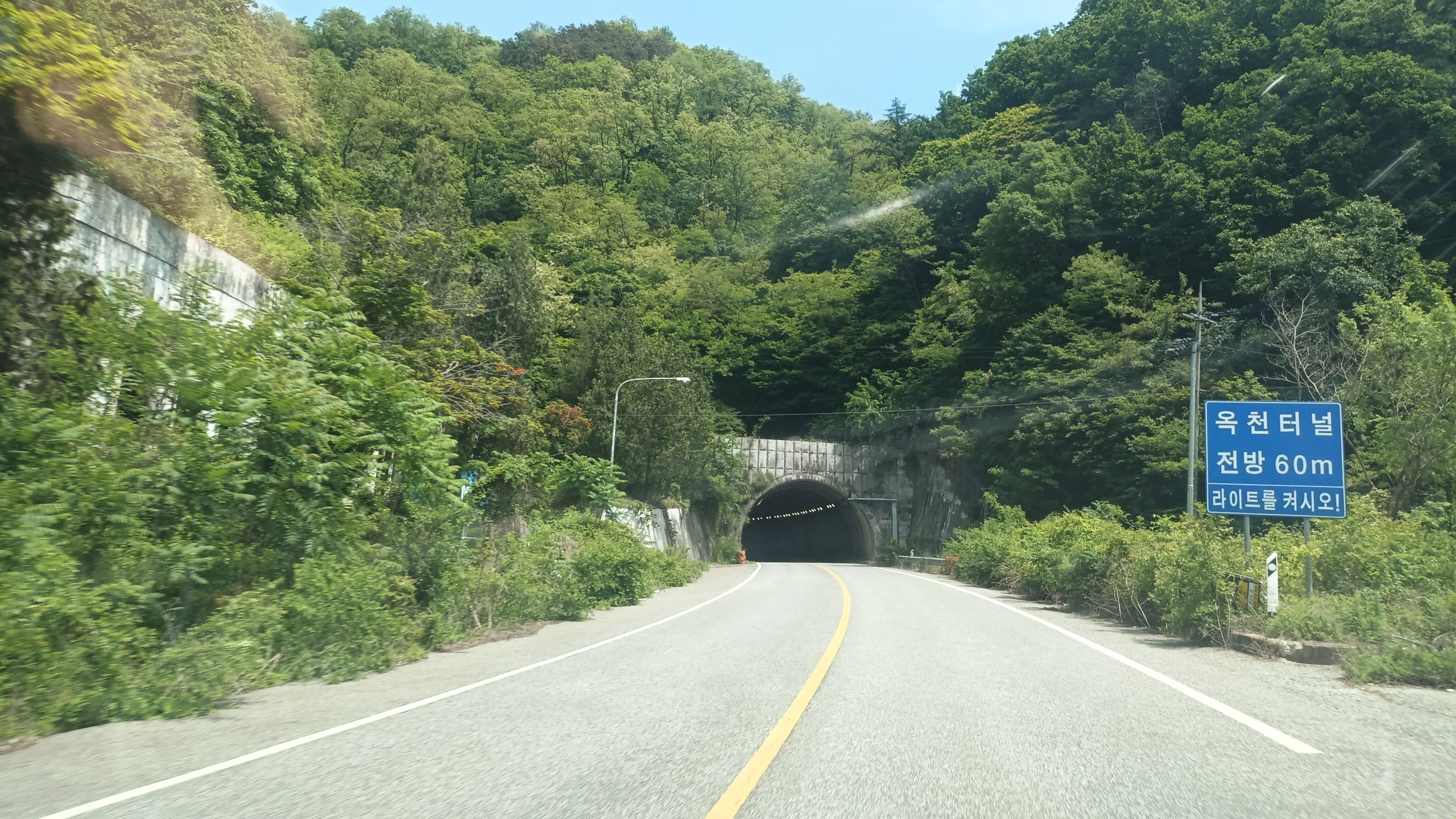
Okcheon Tunnel

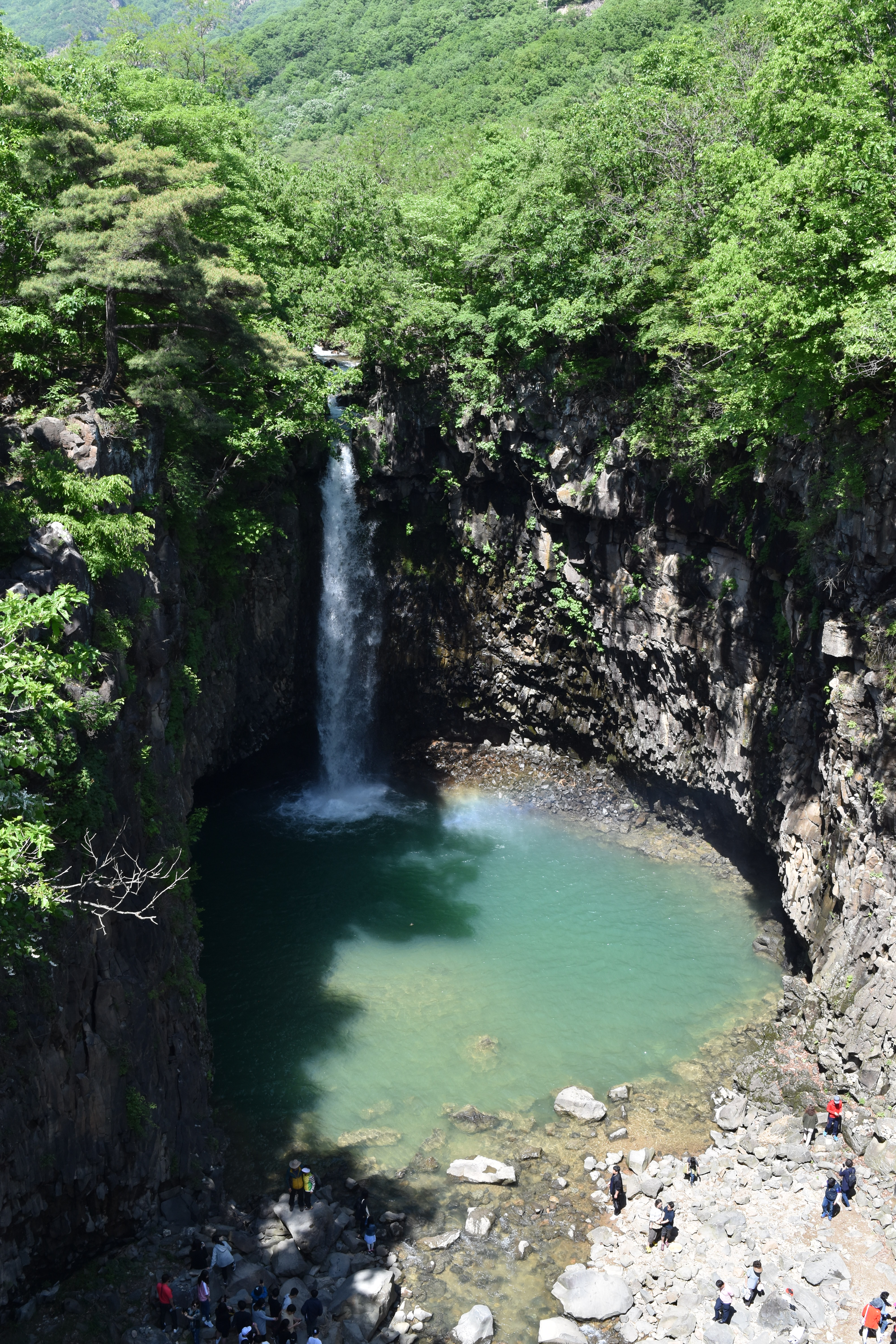
Jaein Fall

Principal photography started on June 8, 2019, and ended on October 23, 2024. Filming took place at a set in Anseong, Gyeonggi Province, a set at Wonbang in Paju, Gyeonggi Province, and several other locations. Siheung City Hall was used as the Seoul Regional Police Agency. Station scenes were filmed at 15 stations in Seoul and Gyeonggi Province, including Digital Media City station, Yangjae Citizen's Forest station, Jeongok station (Gyeongwon Line), Bucheon Stadium station, and Sinjung-dong station. The hideout of the Subway Ghost, a serial killer in the drama, was filmed at a closed platform in Sinseol-dong station and Okcheon Tunnel in Okcheon, North Chungcheong Province. Filming also took place at Jaein Falls, part of the Hantan River UNESCO Global Geopark.

The broadcast schedule for the series was changed because of production difficulties. It was supposed to premiere on August 26, 2019, but was pushed back to October. Director Shin Yun-seop said that filming in subway stations was challenging because the locations remained in use by the public. He added that unexpected issues with preparation, post-production, and computer-generated imagery led the production team to revise the schedule and allow more time to complete the work.

== Release ==
Catch the Ghost was originally scheduled to premiere on August 26, 2019, but its premiere was postponed until October. tvN scheduled The Great Show in its place, as that series had completed production. On October 19, the production team released a group poster featuring Moon Geun-young, Kim Seon-ho, Jung Yoo-jin, Ki Do-hoon, Jo Jae-yoon, and Ahn Seung-kyun on stakeout in a subway station. The press conference of the series was on October 21, 2019, at the Ramada Hotel in Sindorim, Guro-gu, Seoul. It was attended by Director Shin Yoon-seop and the four lead actors: Moon Geun-young, Kim Seon-ho, Jung Yoo-jin, and Jo Jae-yoon. The series aired every Monday and Tuesday from October 21 to December 10, 2019.

In Japan, BS12 Television began airing the series on April 17, 2021, with two consecutive episodes. Fuji TV's streaming service FOD offered the series exclusively on a transactional video-on-demand basis, with episodes 1–16 available from May 3 and episodes 17–32 from June 3. The series was also released on DVD.

== Original soundtrack ==
Catch the Ghost OST

Soundtrack album by Various Artists
- Released: 2019
- Genre: Soundtrack
- Languages: Korean; English
- Label: Stone Music Entertainment
- Producer: Choi Seong-kwon

Music director Choi Seong-kwon oversaw the score production for the series alongside a team of composers. During the drama's broadcast run, Stone Music Entertainment issued six digital singles on a weekly basis before compiling them into a complete soundtrack album in late 2019. The soundtrack rollout began on October 22 with "Feel My Heart" by Kim Woo-sung of the South Korean band The Rose. It was followed a week later by Juniel's "The Star." In November, the label released "Highlight" by Roh Tae-hyun on November 5, "Wanted" by the vocal group ABRY on November 12, and "My Hero" by Ahn Ji-yeon on November 19. The final single "I'm with You" sung by Park Ji-min was released on December.

=== Part 1 ===
Released on October 22, 2019
No.	Title	Lyrics	Music	Artist	Length
1.	"Feel My Heart"	Y.nik, MADEBY	Y.nik, MADEBY	Woosung (The Rose)	3:13
2.	"Feel My Heart" (Inst.)		Y.nik, MADEBY		3:13
Total length:					6:26

=== Part 2 ===
Released on October 29, 2019
No.	Title	Lyrics	Music	Artist	Length
1.	"The Star" (그 별)	Athena, e.Na	Athena, e.Na	Juniel	4:16
2.	"The Star" (Inst.)		Athena, e.Na		4:16
Total length:					8:32

=== Part 3 ===
Released on November 5, 2019
No.	Title	Lyrics	Music	Artist	Length
1.	"Highlight"	Y.nik, MADEBY	Y.nik, MADEBY	Roh Tae-hyun	3:22
2.	"Highlight" (Inst.)		Y.nik, MADEBY		3:22
Total length:					6:44

=== Part 4 ===
Released on November 12, 2019
No.	Title	Lyrics	Music	Artist	Length
1.	"Wanted"	Park Geun-cheol, DANI	RUNY, Juno	ABRY	3:01
2.	"Wanted" (Inst.)		RUNY, Juno		3:01
Total length:					6:02

=== Part 5 ===
Released on November 19, 2019
No.	Title	Lyrics	Music	Artist	Length
1.	"My Hero"	minGtion	Kim Yeon-seo, minGtion	Ahn Ji-yeon	3:40
2.	"My Hero" (Inst.)		Kim Yeon-seo, minGtion		3:40
Total length:					7:20

=== Part 6 ===
Released on November 25, 2019
No.	Title	Lyrics	Music	Artist	Length
1.	"I'm with You" (내가 있다는 걸)	Jayins, Lundi Blues	Jayins, Lundi Blues, Han Jae-wan	Park Ji-min	4:15
2.	"I'm with You" (Inst.)		Jayins, Lundi Blues, Han Jae-wan		4:15
Total length:					8:30

=== Original Soundtrack Album ===
Original score

No.	Title	Lyrics	Music	Artist	Length
1.	"Feel My Heart"	Y.nik, MADEBY	Y.nik, MADEBY	Woosung (The Rose)	3:13
2.	"That Star" (그 별)	Athena, e.Na	Athena, e.Na	Juniel	4:16
3.	"Highlight"	Y.nik, MADEBY	Y.nik, MADEBY	Roh Tae-hyun	3:22
4.	"Wanted"	Park Geun-cheol, DANI	RUNY, Juno	ABRY	3:01
5.	"My Hero"	minGtion	Kim Yeon-seo, minGtion	Ahn Ji-yeon	3:40
6.	"That I'm Here" (내가 있다는 걸)	Jayins, Lundi Blues	Jayins, Lundi Blues, Han Jae-wan	Park Ji-min	4:15
7.	"3D Highlight"		Park Young-ik, Lee Ji-woo, Yang Young-jin		2:15
8.	"Rhythm Tension Bridge"		Kim Min-joo		1:27
9.	"Hustlers"		Heo Sang-eun		2:06
10.	"Leviata"		Choi Sung-kwon		3:24
11.	"Deep Blue"		Choi Sung-kwon		1:48
12.	"Endless Tension"		Lee Ji-woo, Yang Young-jin		1:57
13.	"Lost"		Park Young-ik		1:49
14.	"Get Ready"		Lee Isaac		1:30
15.	"Perfect Run"		Park Young-ik, Lee Ji-woo, Yang Young-jin		2:16
16.	"Catch Me"		Heo Sang-eun		1:31
17.	"CCTV"		Lee Isaac		1:37
18.	"Double Cop"		Choi Sung-kwon		1:48
19.	"Shadow In A Tunnel"		Son Joo-kwang		2:21
20.	"Golden Pipe"		Kim Min-joo		2:22
21.	"The Burning Heart"		Lee Ji-woo, Yang Young-jin		2:06
22.	"Mistery Criminal"		Lee Ji-woo, Yang Young-jin		2:38
23.	"Underworld"		Park Min-ji, Choi Jung-seok		2:28
24.	"A Wild Imagination"		Park Min-ji, Choi Jung-seok		2:43
25.	"Lunatic"		Park Young-ik, Lee Isaac		1:17
26.	"A Heart of Affection"		Park Min-ji		2:44
27.	"Dreamland"		Heo Sang-eun		1:33
28.	"Rainbow"		Heo Sang-eun		2:12
Total length:					67:20

== Viewership ==
Catch the Ghost : South Korea viewers per episode (thousands)

Season	Episode number																Average
Season	1	2	3	4	5	6	7	8	9	10	11	12	13	14	15	16	Average
1	916	884	734	879	719	654	684	747	683	705	604	676	782	759	668	661	735

Source: Audience measurement performed nationwide by Nielsen Media Research.

Average TV viewership ratings
Ep.	Original broadcast date	Title	Average audience share (AGB Nielsen)	
Ep.	Original broadcast date	Title	Nationwide	Seoul
1	October 21, 2019	Subways Transporting Ghosts...	4.148%	4.801%
2	October 22, 2019	Knowing you have a family who will return if you wait...	3.694%	3.918%
3	October 28, 2019	Disciplinary Hearing	3.000%	3.077%
4	October 29, 2019	Tracking Down the Grasshoppers	3.362%	3.817%
5	November 4, 2019	Club Day	3.001%	3.225%
6	November 5, 2019	A Petty Thief?	2.438%	2.582%
7	November 11, 2019	Jealousy & Confusion	2.712%	3.161%
8	November 12, 2019	Facing the Harsh Truth	2.942%	3.109%
9	November 18, 2019	Getting Closer to the Subway Ghost	2.424%	2.617%
10	November 19, 2019	The Hideout	2.431%	2.388%
11	November 25, 2019	Going After the Grasshoppers	2.240%	2.610%
12	November 26, 2019	The One That Got Away	2.755%	3.279%
13	December 2, 2019	The Grasshoppers Are Behind Bars	2.790%	3.262%
14	December 3, 2019	The Subway Ghost Reveals Himself	2.935%	2.767%
15	December 9, 2019	The Subway Ghost's Method	2.598%	2.775%
16	December 10, 2019	Finally Catching The Subway Ghost	2.671%	2.893%
Average			2.884%	3.143%
In the table above, the blue numbers represent the lowest ratings and the red numbers represent the highest ratings.; This drama aired on a cable channel/pay TV which normally has a relatively smaller audience compared to free-to-air TV/public broadcasters (KBS, SBS, MBC and EBS).

== Reception ==
According to RACOI, Catch the Ghost drew substantial pre-broadcast attenion as Moon's television comeback, with news coverage jumping from 611 to 2,405 articles and video clips increasing from 19 to 185 between weeks three and four. The series also maintained a steady presence on Good Data Corporation's Top 10 Television Drama Buzzworthiness chart throughout its run. After debuting at sixth in the fourth week of October, and dipping to ninth the following week, the drama climbed to eighth in early November, and reached fifth the next week following a 1.63% bump in its buzz score. Its ranks fluctuated over the next month, slipping to seventh in the third week of November before rebounding to fifth and settling at sixth. By its finale in the third week of December, the series held sixth place as its popularity score surged by roughly 25% over the prior week, driven by positive viewer response to its happy ending.

Critics gived the series overall positive reviews. Cine21 columnist Yoo Seon-ju highlighted the series focus on space and its musical choice. Writing for Hankyoreh, critic Hwang Jin-mi praised the series' "humanism." Palat from Gulf News called the show underrated gem. Kim Ju-hee from Seoul Economic Daily between the two leads as "unique" and "near perfect" and highlighted their individual performances. She described Moon an "acting queen" for her performance in differentiating the twin sisters through contrasting gazes, gestures, and vocal tones, noting that viewers questioned whether the same actress played both roles. She also described Kim as a "new rom-com king," attributing his appeal to his "unrivaled acting skills" and willingness to perform slapstick comedy, which she felt enhanced Go Ji-seok's charm and resonated with audiences.

== Accolades ==
=== Listicles ===
Name of publisher, year listed, name of listicle, and placement
Publisher	Year	Listicle	Placement	Ref.
Gulf News	2026	5 K-Drama gems that are good to stay underrated and remain hidden: From Catch the Ghost to Rain or Shine	Shortlisted	
KOFICE	2024	Monthly Hallyu Report - September 2024 Issue; Top 50 K-content in Malaysia	17th	
KOFICE	2026	Monthly Hallyu Report - May 2026 Issue; Top 100 K-content in Indonesia	72th	
