= Lee Charm =

South Korean actor and entrepreneur

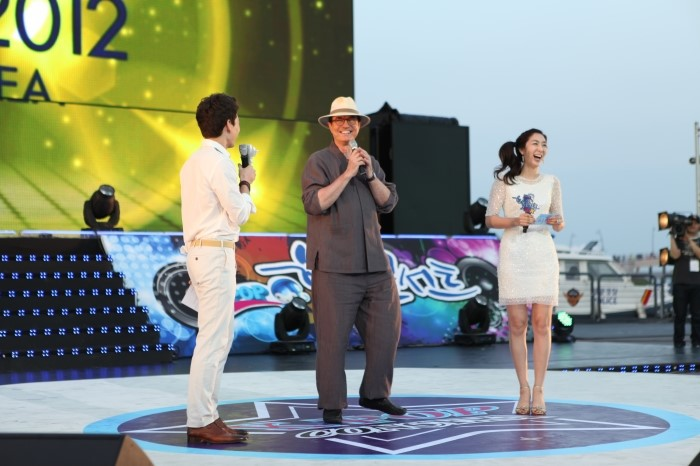
- Lee (center) in 2012
- Born: Bernhard Quandt; 3 April 1954 (age 72); Bad Kreuznach, Rhineland-Palatinate, West Germany
- Occupations: Actor; entrepreneur

Korean name
- Hangul: 이참
- Hanja: 李參
- RR: I Cham
- MR: I Ch'am

Former name
- Hangul: 이한우
- Hanja: 李韓祐
- RR: I Hanu
- MR: I Hanu

Lee Charm (이참; born 3 April 1954 as Bernhard Quandt), formerly known as Lee Han-woo (이한우), is a German-born South Korean actor and entrepreneur.

He moved to South Korea in the 1980s and worked as an actor and broadcaster. He was originally a member of the Unification Church, but converted to Protestantism after moving to Korea. He had a personal friendship with former President Lee Myung-bak, and participated in his presidential election campaign in 2007. He authored several books discussing his own perspectives on Korean culture.

He was the CEO of the Korea Tourism Organization from July 2009 to November 2013. He stepped down from the position due to a sex scandal during his visit to Japan.

== Filmography ==
=== Film ===
- Hanbando (2006)

=== Television ===
- Amnok River Flows (SBS, 2008)
- East of Eden (MBC, 2008)
- New Heart (MBC, 2007)
- Lobbyist (SBS, 2007)
- Seoul 1945 (KBS, 2006)
- 5th Republic (MBC, 2005)
- The Age of Heroes (MBC, 2004)
- Love Story in Harvard (SBS, 2004)
- Stairway to Heaven (SBS, 2003)
- Empress Myeongseong (KBS, 2001)
- 4th Republic (MBC, 1995)
- Dazzling Dawn (KBS1, 1995)
- Daughters of a Rich Family (KBS2, 1994)

== Publications ==
- 나는 독일제 순 한국인 (1997) ISBN 9788970122809
- 툭 터놓고 씹는 이야기 (2000) ISBN 9788953295209
- 무한한 가능성을 가진 답답한 나라 한국 (2007) ISBN 9788987355214
