= Lee Wan =

South Korean actor (born 1984)

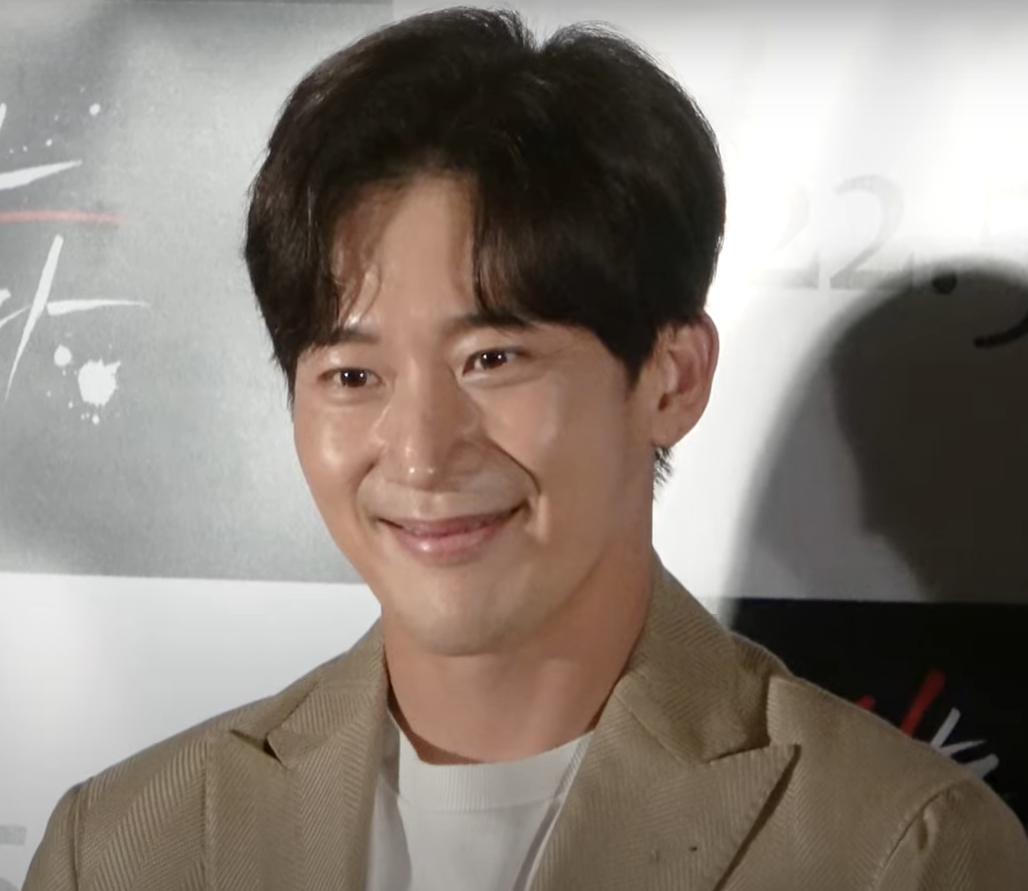
- Lee in May 2022
- Born: Kim Hyung-soo; January 3, 1984 (age 42); Nam District, Ulsan, South Korea
- Education: Kookmin University - Physical Education; Kookmin University Graduate School - Sports Management
- Occupation: Actor
- Years active: 2003–present
- Agent: Story J Company
- Height: 1.76 m (5 ft 9 1/2 in)
- Spouse: Lee Bo-mee (m. 2019)
- Relatives: Kim Tae-hee (sister); Rain (brother-in-law)

Korean name
- Hangul: 김형수
- Hanja: 金亨洙
- RR: Gim Hyeongsu
- MR: Kim Hyŏngsu

Stage name
- Hangul: 이완
- Hanja: 李完
- RR: I Wan
- MR: I Wan
- Website: lee-wan.com

Lee Wan (Korean: 이완; born January 3, 1984), born Kim Hyung-soo (김형수), is a South Korean actor.

== Career ==
Born as Kim Hyung-soo, he began his career in entertainment after starring in a music video alongside older sister, actress Kim Tae-hee. Using the stage name Lee Wan, he made his acting debut in 2003. He first drew notice in a supporting role in the television drama Stairway to Heaven, followed by leading roles in romantic comedies Snow White: Taste Sweet Love and Let's Go to the Beach. He reunited with Stairway to Heaven costar Park Shin-hye in 2006 in the melodrama Tree of Heaven which was a joint Korean-Japanese production. Lee also contributed the song "Where Farewells Don't Exist" to the drama's soundtrack.

Lee's increased Korean Wave popularity led to him being cast in as the leading man in the Japanese film Veronika Decides to Die (based on the same-titled novel by Paulo Coelho), which screened at the 2005 Tokyo International Film Festival. He also played the leading role opposite Ami Suzuki in the 2007 Japanese television drama Magnolia no Hana no Shita de ("Under the Magnolia"), which portrayed a romance between a Korean man and a Japanese woman who meet while studying in New York City. Afterwards, he returned to Korean television with a supporting role in In-soon Is Pretty, as the protagonist's younger brother.

In 2008, Lee starred in the Korean War film Once Upon a Time in Seoul. He next played a villain in the gambling-themed series Swallow the Sun in 2009.

Lee enlisted for mandatory military service on 12 July 2010, and was part of the entertainment soldiers unit of the Defense Media Agency under the Ministry of National Defense. He was discharged on 23 April 2012.

As his first post-army project, Lee appeared in the 2013 online drama It's Not Over Yet; it aired in 6-part 10-minute installments on social networking sites. In 2015, he starred in Northern Limit Line, a naval thriller about the Second Battle of Yeonpyeong.

== Personal life ==
On 27 November 2018 his agency confirmed he is dating pro-golfer Lee Bo-mee. The couple officially tied the knot at a Catholic church with their family and friends in a private wedding on 28 December 2019.

== Filmography ==
=== Television series ===
- My Fair Lady (SBS, 2003)
- Nursery Story (MBC, 2003)
- Stairway to Heaven (SBS, 2003)
- Snow White: Taste Sweet Love (KBS2, 2004)
- Little Women (SBS, 2004)
- Let's Go to the Beach (SBS, 2005)
- Tree of Heaven (SBS, 2006)
- Magnolia no Hana no Shita de (Fuji TV, 2007)
- In-soon Is Pretty (KBS2, 2007)
- Ryokiteki na Kanojo (TBS, 2008) (cameo)
- Swallow the Sun (SBS, 2009)
- It's Not Over Yet (SNS, 2013)
- Our Gap-soon (SBS, 2016–2017)

=== Film ===
- Veronika Decides to Die (2005)
- Once Upon a Time in Seoul (2008)
- Northern Limit Line (2015)
- Cinema Street (2021) – Cha Do-young
- Blood is thicker than water (2022) – Young Min

=== Variety shows ===
- Cool Kiz on the Block (KBS2, 2014)
- Match Made in Heaven Return (2015)
- Law of the Jungle (2017)

=== Music video appearances ===
- Vibe – "While Looking at the Picture"
- Vintage Blue – "Love Is"
- Position – "You Just Being in This World"
- Tei – "Same Pillow"
- Tei – "Locked Up in Tears"

== Awards ==
- 2004 SBS Drama Awards: New Star Award (Little Women)
- 2004 KBS Drama Awards: Best New Actor (Snow White: Taste Sweet Love)
