= Lee Jang-soo (television director) =

South Korean television director and producer

- Born: 5 April 1960 (age 66); South Korea
- Other name: Lee Jang-su
- Education: Inha University – Bachelor of Civil Engineering (grad. 1982); Torch Trinity Graduate School of Theology – General Theology (grad. 2009)
- Occupations: Director, producer, businessperson
- Years active: 1991–present
- Agent: Logos Film
- Known for: Heaven Trilogy (Beautiful Days, Stairway to Heaven, Tree of Heaven)

Korean name
- Hangul: 이장수
- Hanja: 李章洙
- RR: I Jangsu
- MR: I Changsu

Lee Jang-soo (Korean: 이장수; born 5 April 1960) is a South Korean television director and producer. He is the founder of the production company Logos Film.

== Experience ==
- Drama director for SBS and MBC
- Freelance Director for TV Series and Film
- Director and Producer of Logos Film

== Personal life ==
Lee is a practicing Christian. As seen in Logos Film's SaraminHR profile, the reason of its foundation in 2000 was to produce just Christianity-related content.

== Awards ==
- 2017 10th Korea Drama Awards, Best Producer「Good Manager」
- 2017 Broadcast Promotion Merit Award, Presidential Citation
- 2014 50th Baeksang Arts Awards, Best TV Drama Series「Good Doctor」
- 2012 5th Korea Drama Awards, Best TV Drama Series「My Husband got a Family」
- 2011 Commendation from the minister of Culture, Sports and Tourism
- 2004 2nd Andre Kim Best Star Awards「Stairway to Heaven」
- 2002 SBS Evaluation Award (The Second Half of the Year), Best TV Show「Shooting a Star」
- 2001 SBS Evaluation Award (The First Half of the Year), Best TV Show「Beautiful Days」
- 1998 34th Baeksang Arts Awards, Best Director for TV Series「Sae Ki」
- 1998 34th Baeksang Arts Awards, Grand Prix for TV Series「Sae Ki」
- 1997 30th World Fest Houston Gold Award for「Beef Soup」
- 1996 The New York Festival Finalist Award for「Beef Soup」
- 1995 28th World Fest Houston Merit-Finalist for 「Light the Candles」
- 1993 SBS Evaluation Award (The Fourth Quarter), Best Director「Light the Candles」
- 1992 SBS Evaluation Award (Second quarter), Best Director「Marigold Flower」
- 1990 MBC Evaluation Award (The Third Quarter), Best TV Show「The Woman」
- 1988 Korean Lyric Awards, Beautiful Lyric Award for 「The Child」

== Works ==
=== As director ===
==== Television ====
- Love Windmill (SBS, 1991)
- Blue Thread, Red Thread (SBS, 1992)
- Marigold Flower (SBS, 1992)
- Desire on the Sand (SBS, 1992)
- The Thing Called Love (SBS, 1993)
- Light the Candles (SBS, 1993)
- There Goes the Tokebi (SBS, 1994)
- Asphalt Man (SBS, 1995)
- Beef Soup (SBS, 1996)
- Beautiful Lady (SBS, 1997)
- Longing (SBS, 1997)
- Sae Ki (SBS, 1997)
- Love You, Love you (SBS, 1998)
- Beautiful Days (SBS, 2001)
- Shooting a Star (SBS, 2002)
- Stairway to Heaven (SBS, 2003)
- Love Story in Harvard (SBS, 2004)
- Tree of Heaven (SBS, 2006)
- The Relation of Face, Mind and Love (SBS/TV Asahi, 2010)
- Paradise (SBS, 2009)
- Road No. 1 (MBC, 2010)

==== Film ====
- Love (1999)
- Paradise (2009)

=== As writer ===
==== Book ====
- I Want to Live for 20 Years (with Kim Chang-wan) (1990)
- If You Hated Someone, You Actually Loved the One (2014)

=== As producer ===
- Screen (SBS, 2003)
- Stairway to Heaven (SBS, 2003)
- Save Your Last Dance For Me (SBS, 2004)
- Love Story in Harvard (SBS, 2004)
- Summer Beach (SBS, 2005)
- Miracle of Love (SBS, 2005)
- Heaven's Tree (SBS, 2006)
- The Daring Sisters (MBC, 2006)
- Last Scandal (MBC, 2008)
- Little Mom Scandal (Channel CGV, 2008)
- Smile, Dearies! (SBS, 2009)
- Road No. 1 (MBC, 2010)
- Listen to My Heart (MBC, 2011)
- Heavenly Garden 'Gombaeryoung' (Channel A)
- Color of Woman (Channel A)
- Come, Come, Absolutely Come (MBN, 2011)
- My Husband Got a Family (KBS, 2012)
- Happy Ending (JTBC, 2012)
- Good Doctor (KBS, 2013)
- Her Legend (JTBC, 2013)
- Feel-Good Day (SBS, 2014)
- Remember – War of the Son (SBS, 2015)
- My Fair Lady (KBS, 2016)
- Good Manager (KBS, 2017)
- Cross (tvN, 2018)
- Lawless Lawyer (tvN, 2018)
- Catch the Ghost (tvN, 2019)
- Vincenzo
