= Love Story in Harvard =

- Promotional poster
- Genre: Romance; Drama
- Written by: Choi Wan-kyu; Son Eun-hye
- Directed by: Lee Jang-soo; Lee Jin-suk
- Starring: Kim Rae-won; Kim Tae-hee
- Country of origin: South Korea
- Original languages: Korean; English
- No. of episodes: 16

Production
- Producers: Kim Young-sup; Jo Soo-won; Lee Jin-suk
- Production locations: Korea; Boston
- Running time: 60 minutes
- Production companies: JS Pictures; Logos Film

Original release
- Network: SBS
- Release: November 22, 2004 – January 11, 2005

Love Story in Harvard (Korean: 러브스토리 인 하버드; RR: Reobeuseutori in Habeodeu) is a 2004 South Korean television series starring Kim Rae-won and Kim Tae-hee. It aired on SBS from November 22, 2004 to January 11, 2005 on Mondays and Tuesdays at 21:55 for 16 episodes.

== Synopsis ==
The first half of the series is set at Harvard University and is mainly concerned with the burgeoning relationship between a Harvard Law School student, Kim Hyun-woo (Kim Rae-won), and a Harvard Medical School student, Lee Soo-in (Kim Tae-hee).

Kim Hyun-woo and Alex Hong (Lee Jung-jin) are two first-year students at Harvard Law School, both from South Korea. Alex applies himself more and as such is the favorite of Professor John H. Keynes (Frank Gorshin). Hyun-woo, who initially has a hard time adjusting to the workload, falls into the bad graces of the professor, who repeatedly humiliates or ignores him. However, Hyun-woo perseveres and eventually wins the respect of Professor Keynes and his classmates. Both men meet and fall for Lee Soo-in, a third-year Korean student at Harvard Medical School. This intensifies the rivalry between them.

Hyun-woo and Soo-in grow closer and eventually start dating. However, their relationship is short-lived as Soo-in's application to join OEP, an organization that provides medical care to patients in Third World countries, is accepted. After spending a night together, Soo-in breaks off all contact with Hyun-woo and leaves to work in South America, leaving him devastated.

The second half of the story takes place mainly in Seoul, after Hyun-woo and Alex have graduated from Harvard Law School. Hyun-woo is now an idealistic lawyer, refusing to take on lucrative corporate cases and only defending people he feels have no voice in the legal system. Alex, who remained in the US after graduation, returns to Korea to take on a case for an international chemicals company, which is being accused of dumping toxic substances. Hyun-woo becomes involved in the same case, although on the side of the victims demanding compensation. In addition, Soo-in also returns to Korea at around the same time to conduct some medical research. Unknown to her at first, the research is related to the chemicals case that Alex and Hyun-woo are both working on, and predictably the three meet up again.

Although Hyun-woo is still angry at Soo-in for leaving him so abruptly, he still has feelings for her, so does Alex.

== Cast ==
=== Main ===
- Kim Rae-won as Kim Hyun-woo - 1st year law student
- Kim Tae-hee as Lee Soo-in - 3rd year medical student
- Lee Jung-jin as Hong Jung-min / Alex Hong
- Kim Min as Yoo Jin-ah

=== Supporting ===
- Kang Nam-gil as Oh Young-jae (law professor)
- Jung Sol-hee as Han Seul-gi
- Frank Gorshin as Professor John H. Keynes
- Seo Ji-hee as Chun Da-woon
- Lee Charm as Jason Walker
- Ben Wells as Ricky Don (Jung-min's friend)
- Joo Hyun as Lee Yong-goo (Soo-in's father)
- Kim Chang-wan as Soo-in's doctor
- Lee Seung-hyung as Jason Walker's lawyer

== Production ==
Although the drama is set at Harvard University, it was filmed at the University of Southern California and UCLA.

== Ratings ==
Date	Episode	Nationwide	Seoul area
2004-11-22	1	13.2%	15.1%
2004-11-23	2	14.2%	15.6%
2004-11-29	3	17.2%	18.8%
2004-11-30	4	16.4%	17.6%
2004-12-06	5	19.7%	22.1%
2004-12-07	6	17.5%	19.7%
2004-12-13	7	17.6%	19.6%
2004-12-14	8	16.5%	18.1%
2004-12-20	9	17.2%	18.6%
2004-12-21	10	17.7%	18.8%
2004-12-27	11	16.9%	19.4%
2004-12-28	12	13.1%	14.5%
2005-01-03	13	21.1%	23.2%
2005-01-04	14	19.3%	20.7%
2005-01-10	15	18.9%	20.4%
2005-01-11	16	20.0%	22.3%
Average		17.3%	19.0%

Source: TNS Media Korea
