= My Fair Lady (2003 TV series) =

South Korean television drama

- Official poster
- Also known as: Yojo Lady; The Perfect Girl
- Hangul: 요조숙녀
- Hanja: 窈窕淑女
- RR: Yojosungnyeo
- MR: Yojosungnyŏ
- Genre: Romance, Drama
- Starring: Kim Hee-sun; Go Soo; Park Han-byul; Son Chang-min
- Country of origin: South Korea
- Original language: Korean
- No. of episodes: 16

Production
- Running time: 60 minutes
- Production company: Chorokbaem Media

Original release
- Network: Seoul Broadcasting System
- Release: August 13 – October 12, 2003

My Fair Lady (Korean: 요조숙녀) is a 2003 South Korean television drama produced and first broadcast by SBS. It has a total of 16 episodes, and is a remake of the 2000 Japanese drama Yamatonadeshiko (やまとなでしこ), which aired on Fuji Television.

== Plot ==
Min-kyung, is a fresh high school graduate. She has worked in a liquor restaurant to pay off her father's gambling debt. However, Min-kyung borrowed some money and ran away, hoping to find a rich man as her spouse. Meanwhile, Young Ho is the son of a poor rice cake house owner, and works to pay off his dead father's debt. He falls in love with Min-kyung, because she looks exactly like his dead girlfriend. When Min Kyung finds out that Young Ho is not rich, she dumps him, and goes back to a rich man (Son Chang Min) who proposed to Min Kyung once before. However, Min Kyung wakes up to true love and realizes that happiness does not necessarily come in money.

Young-ho's father Moon Dae-cha (Lee Soon-jae) observed his diligence and decided to give Young-ho a chance to prove his worth in comparison with Dong-kyu (There is no scene that Young-ho realized that Moon Dae-cha is his illegitimate biological father, and his dead father who left debt is not his birth father, but a stepfather). Young-ho's father announced that there would be a fair competition from the two men to prove their worth and decide the heir to the company.

That same night, Young-ho's father met Min-kyung's father. Dong-kyu's father, who was drunk, knocked down the duo as they were talking to each other and crossing the road. Dong-kyu was seen rushing and persuaded his father to escape while he called for an ambulance.

Dong-kyu used this opportunity to gain advantage over Young-ho in the competition to become the heir, with his father's help. Young-ho, on the other hand, was having a hard time struggling to compete against Dong-kyu and his acts of sabotage.

Young-ho was shocked when he saw his father at the meeting. Young-ho was declared to be the heir of the company and both Dong-kyu and his father announced their resignations.

Young-ho instead wished to fulfill his long-time dream of becoming an astronomer and announced his intention of resigning as boss in order to become a full-time astronomer, after working for a few months. With the consent of his father, Young-ho took up astronomy at a space observation centre in Australia. He later married Min-kyung, and was seen swearing their wedding vows in front of a Christian priest.

== Cast ==
- Kim Hee-sun as Ha Min-kyung
- Go Soo as Shin Young-ho
- Park Han-byul as Choi Su-yeon
- Son Chang-min as Moon Dong-kyu (Young-ho's cousin)
- Kwon Hae-hyo as Go Hyun-tak
- Shin Jung-hwan as Joo Tae-seong
- Lee Wan as Nam Kyung-suk
- Park Joo-mi
- Kim Jung-nan as Yoon Jung-hee
- Jo Yi-jin as Yoo Ji-in
- Lee Yoon-sung as Myeong Hye-jin
- Lee Young-eun as Cha Joo-mi
- Lee Soon-jae as Moon Dae-cha (Young-ho's illegitimate biological father)
- Sunwoo Eun-sook as Oh Nam-sook (Young-ho's mother)
- Im Hyun-sik as Ha Yeon-ku (Min-kyung's father)
- Jung Wook as Moon Dae-pyeong (Dong-kyu's father, Dae-cha's brother, & Young-ho's illegitimate uncle)
- Jung Jae-soon as Baek Seol-hwa (Dong-kyu's mother)
- Seo Jin-wook as President of Electronics Company
- Hwang Hyeon-jun as Security Guard
