= Tree of Heaven (TV series) =

South Korean-Japanese television series

- Also known as: Heaven's Tree; Trees in Heaven
- Genre: Romance; Melodrama
- Written by: Moon Hee-jung; Kim Nam-hee
- Directed by: Lee Jang-soo
- Starring: Lee Wan; Park Shin-hye
- Country of origin: South Korea
- Original languages: Korean; Japanese
- No. of episodes: 10

Production
- Executive producer: Huh Woong
- Producer: Ko Kyung-hee
- Production location: Japan
- Production companies: Logos Film Co. Kadokawa Pictures

Original release
- Network: SBS TV
- Release: 8 February – 9 March 2006

Tree of Heaven (Korean: 천국의 나무; RR: Cheongugui namu) is a 2006 South Korean-Japanese series starring Lee Wan and Park Shin-hye . It aired on SBS from February 8 to March 9, 2006 on Wednesdays and Thursdays at 21:55 for 10 episodes.

The drama is also the final entry in director Lee Jang-soo's Heaven Trilogy which included Beautiful Days in 2001 and Stairway to Heaven in 2003. Also known as Tengoku no ki (天国の樹), the series was filmed completely in Japan and featured a cast of both Korean and Japanese actors.

== Synopsis ==
Bright and optimistic Korean Japanese teenager Hana (Park Shin-hye) lives at a small hot springs inn owned by her mother. When her mother decides to marry a Korean man, she tries her best to reach out to her odd, introverted stepbrother-to-be Yoon Seo (Lee Wan), who likes to walk barefoot in the snow. He rebuffs her initial efforts, but her cheer eventually wins him over. With their parents on honeymoon, together Hana and Yoon Seo stand up to Hana's spiteful aunt Yoko (Kim Chung) and cousin Maya (Asami Reina), and the two develop an increasingly close relationship over time. Yoon Seo is forward in his love for Hana, but despite feeling the same way, she is unwilling to break the taboo of a romance between step-siblings. After graduating from high school, she leaves for Tokyo with her admirer Fujiwara Ryu (Asahi Uchida), and loses contact with Yoon Seo. 2 years later, Hana, Yoon Seo, and Maya meet again. Time has led them down very different roads, but the love and the rivalry remain the same. At the end both meet up during Hana's marriage but unfortunately they both get hit by an accident. Because of the accident, Hana is in need of a heart transplant which is done by Yoon Seo. Later she finds out that Yoon Seo is no longer alive and listens to his message to live well so that they can reunite in heaven where there would be no separation. The tree of heaven is still there to protect Hana.

== Cast ==
- Lee Wan as Yoon Seo
- Park Shin-hye as Hana
- Reina Asami as Maya
- Asahi Uchida as Fujiwara Ryu
- Jung Dong-hwan as Yoon Soo-ha, Yoon Seo's father
- Kim Chung as Yoko, Maya's mother
- Aika Mire as Michiko, Hana's mother
- Takasugi Ko as Iwa, Yoon Seo's driver/bodyguard
- Lee Jung-gil as Boss
- Sonim as Mika, Hana's friend
- Kobayashi Kinako

== International broadcast ==
In Japan, an abridged version of the series dubbed in Japanese aired on terrestrial network Fuji TV on late-night Thursdays beginning April 13, 2006, and on Fuji TV's satellite channel BS Fuji on Thursdays at 9:00 p.m. beginning April 6, 2006. The original version (with Korean audio and Japanese subtitles) aired on Fuji TV's cable channel CS Fuji in July 2006.

It aired in Thailand on Channel 7 beginning July 25, 2012, under the title "สุดปลายฟ้าสัญญารักนิรันดร์" (read as "Sud Plai Fha Sunya Rak Nirandon", literally: Eternal Love at Horizon).
