= Ben Wells (actor) =

American television and movie actor (born 1982)

Ben Wells (born April 14, 1982, in Springfield, Illinois) is an American television and movie actor. He made his debut on the feature film RiffRaff with co-star Robert Belushi.

== Biography ==
Wells grew up in Springfield, IL and graduated in June 2005 from the University of California in Los Angeles, majoring in theater. His great-grandfather Maurice Carter Tull was an award-winning playwright with his 1920's Broadway theater play Treason in which his great-grandmother played the walk on part of the nurse.

== Television ==
- 2004: Love Story in Harvard

== Film ==
- 2005: Annihilation (Short)
- 2006: Riffraff
