= Asphalt Man =

South Korean television series

- Also known as: The Man on the Asphalt; The Man from the Asphalt Street; Dream Racers
- Hangul: 아스팔트 사나이
- RR: Aseupalteu sanai
- MR: Asŭp'alt'ŭ sanai
- Based on: Asphalt Man by Huh Young-man
- Written by: Park Hyun-joo
- Directed by: Lee Jang-soo
- Starring: Lee Byung-hun; Jung Woo-sung; Choi Jin-sil; Lee Young-ae
- Composer: Choi Kyung-shik
- Country of origin: South Korea
- Original language: Korean
- No. of episodes: 16

Production
- Production locations: Korea; United States
- Running time: Wednesdays and Thursdays at 21:55 (KST)

Original release
- Network: SBS TV
- Release: May 17 – July 6, 1995

Asphalt Man (Korean: 아스팔트 사나이; RR: Aseupalteu sanai) is a 1995 South Korean television series starring Lee Byung-hun, Jung Woo-sung, Choi Jin-sil, and Lee Young-ae. Based on the 1991 comic of the same title by manhwa artist Huh Young-man, it aired on SBS TV from May 17 to July 6, 1995, on Wednesdays and Thursdays at 21:55 for 16 episodes.

== Plot ==
Kang Dong-joon (Lee Byung-hun) is a young car designer who dreams of starting his own car company in Korea. He tries to get assistance from his father (Park In-hwan), but the family is in financial trouble. His younger brother Dong-seok (Jung Woo-sung) hates their father, and leaves the country to become a car racer in the United States. Meanwhile, his sister Dong-hee (Lee Young-ae) also flees to the U.S. after conceiving a child with a U.S. army soldier.

== Cast ==
=== Kang family ===
- Lee Byung-hun as Kang Dong-joon
- Jung Woo-sung as Kang Dong-seok (brother)
- Lee Young-ae as Kang Dong-hee (sister)
- Park In-hwan as Mr. Kang (father)
- Choi Jin-sil as Oh Hwa-ryun (Dong-joon's wife)

=== Other people ===
- Huh Joon-ho as Han Ki-soo
- Kim Soo-mi as Natasha
- Jo Min-su as Bae Jong-ok
- Kim Soo-ji as Song-yi (Natasha's daughter)
- Lee Jung-gil as Son Ki Joon
- Byun Hee-bong
- Song Jae-ho
- Daniel Beauchamp as Tom (American Soldier)

== Production ==
Asphalt Man began shooting in late 1994 with an estimated production budget of ₩1 billion per episode. Filming took 5 months, at the Hyundai auto factory plant in Ulsan and in Dongducheon, including 45 days of overseas location shoots in the United States, which was rare at that time for a Korean drama. The U.S. scenes were filmed in Death Valley and Silver Peak, Alpine County in California. The snow rally in the drama's climax was shot in Utah, though several cast and crew members reportedly suffered from oxygen deficiency.

As the drama's official sponsor, Hyundai Motor Company contributed more than ₩1.2 billion. Various models of Hyundai Motors were featured in the drama as concept cars, production models and Rally vehicles, such as the Accent and the Elantra/Avante. In particular, the Tiburon was first introduced in the scene of Dong-joon's Death Valley Rally.
