= Beautiful Days (TV series) =

- Promotional poster
- Genre: Romance; Drama
- Written by: Yoon Sung-hee
- Directed by: Lee Jang-soo
- Starring: Lee Byung-hun; Choi Ji-woo; Ryu Si-won; Lee Jung-hyun
- Country of origin: South Korea
- Original language: Korean
- No. of episodes: 24

Production
- Running time: 60 minutes
- Production company: Kim Jong-hak Production

Original release
- Network: Seoul Broadcasting System
- Release: March 14 – May 31, 2001

Beautiful Days (Korean: 아름다운 날들; RR: Areumdaun naldeul) is a 2001 South Korean television drama series starring Lee Byung-hun, Choi Ji-woo, Ryu Si-won and Lee Jung-hyun. The drama is the first entry in director Lee Jang-soo's Heaven Trilogy which includes Stairways to Heaven in 2003 and Tree of Heaven in 2006. It aired on SBS from March 14 to May 31, 2001, on Wednesdays and Thursdays at 21:55 for 24 episodes.

== Synopsis ==
Similar to its drama contemporaries, Beautiful Days involves conflicts in family relationships, as well as a love triangle.

Lee Min-chul (Lee Byung-hun) returns from studying in the US, to take an active role in his father's prospering music business, Victory Records. It turns out that his father (Lee Jung-gil) was involved in unethical practices in the past, as well as in the murder of the father of Min-chul's stepbrother, Sun-jae (Ryu Si-won).

Into the scene comes two girls from an orphanage, Yeon-soo (Choi Ji-woo) and Se-na (Lee Jung-hyun), who share a sisterly bond. Se-na gets inspired to become a pop star after a visit by the Victory Records boss on a charity event.

Years pass, and both girls arrive in Seoul to start their adult lives. However, they get separated. Yeon-soo finds a job working at Victory Records in hopes of one day meeting Se-na again and becomes involved in the lives of the stepbrothers, Min-chul and Sun-jae. Yeon-soo and Min-chul make a deal that they will help each other's siblings. Yeon-soo moves into Min-chul's family home as a tutor for his younger sister Min-ji (Shin Min-a), and Min-chul will help Se-na achieve her dream of becoming a singer. A complex drama unfolds when Min-chul and Sun-jae both fall for Yeon-soo. Yeon-soo chooses Min-chul, but their love is threatened by a terminal illness.

== Cast ==
=== Main ===
- Lee Byung-hun as Lee Min-chul
  - Baek Sung-hyun as young Lee Min-chul
- Choi Ji-woo as Kim Yeon-soo
- Ryu Si-won as Lee Sun-jae - Min-chul's stepbrother
- Lee Jung-hyun as Kim Se-na - Yeon-soo's sister

=== Supporting ===
- Shin Min-a as Lee Min-ji - Min-chul's sister
- Lee Yoo-jin as Kang Na-rae - Yeon-soo's roommate and co-worker
- Lee Jung-gil as Lee Sung-chun - Min-chul's father
- Lee Kyung-jin as Jung Myung-ja - Sun-jae's mother
- Ha Jae-young as Lee Young-jun - Sun-jae's father
- Lee Sang-woo as Oh Jung-hun - composer and Sun-jae's high school upperclassman
- Kim Dong-hyun as Min Kyu-suk - bodyguard/chauffeur
- Lee Hwi-hyang as Yang Mi-mi / Yang Kyung-hee - singer
- Lee Ae-jung as Shin Jae-eun
- Kim Chung
- Kil Yong-woo
- Yoon Gi-won
- Oh Seung-eun
- Kim Min-sang
- Psy as himself (cameo, ep. 15)

== Production ==
=== Filming locations ===
Many of the scenes were filmed on location in Seoul:

- The streets and area around Sinchon-dong and Ewha Womans University.
- Synnara Record (formerly Tower Records) in Changcheon-dong, near Sinchon Station, was used as "Victory Records."
- Café Pascucci in Apgujeong-dong was used as the office of "Muse Records" and venue where characters meet and talk.

=== Ending ===
The original script had intended that the character of Yeon-soo would die, but in response to a flood of protest letters from anguished viewers, the drama lets her live. Sena went on to succeed as a singer.

== Soundtrack ==
1. 그때까지 안녕 - Zero
2. 약속 - Zero
3. Heaven - Lee Jung-hyun
4. 약속 - Ryu Si-won
5. 그대뒤에서 - Zero
6. For You - Zero
7. 그때까지 안녕 - Ryu Si-won
8. 언제나 오늘 처럼 - Various Artists
9. 꿈 - Lee Jung-hyun
10. Missing You - Ryu Si-won
11. Please
12. 상처 - Ryu Si-won
13. 너만을 위해
14. 부탁 - Zero
15. Heaven (Music Video) - Lee Jung-hyun

== International broadcast ==
The series aired in Japan on NHK in October 2004; it was popular and well received by Japanese viewers. In Thailand first aired on Channel 3 every Fridays and Saturdays at 10:30 p.m., starting from January 6 to March 30, 2007. In Vietnam, the series aired on the channel VTV3 in November 2003.

== Remake ==
An Indonesian remake was titled Cincin.
