= Stairway to Heaven (South Korean TV series) =

- Promotional poster
- Hangul: 천국의 계단
- Hanja: 天國의 階段
- RR: Cheongugui gyedan
- MR: Ch'ŏn'gugŭi kyedan
- Genre: Romance; Melodrama; Tragedy
- Written by: Park Hye-kyung
- Directed by: Lee Jang-soo
- Starring: Choi Ji-woo; Kwon Sang-woo; Shin Hyun-joon; Kim Tae-hee
- Music by: Choi Kyung-sik
- Country of origin: South Korea
- Original language: Korean
- No. of episodes: 20

Production
- Producer: Lee Jang-soo
- Running time: 60 minutes
- Production company: Logos Film

Original release
- Network: SBS TV
- Release: 3 December 2003 – 5 February 2004

Related
- Stairway to Heaven (Philippines); Sky and Earth Has Affection (Taiwan)

Stairway to Heaven (Korean: 천국의 계단; RR: Cheongugui gyedan) is a 2003 South Korean television series starring Choi Ji-woo, Kwon Sang-woo, Shin Hyun-joon, and Kim Tae-hee. It aired on SBS from 3 December 2003 to 5 February 2004 on Wednesdays and Thursdays at 21:55 for 20 episodes. The title of the show comes from the Led Zeppelin song of the same name, which is frequently used in the soundtrack.

The drama is the second entry in director Lee Jang-soo's Heaven Trilogy which included Beautiful Days in 2001 and Tree of Heaven in 2006. The drama was a hit and received an average viewership rating of 38.8%, and 45.3% for the finale.

== Synopsis ==
Han Jung-suh (Choi Ji-woo) and Cha Song-joo (Kwon Sang-woo) are childhood friends and have a special bond that blossoms into love. They both share the pain of losing a loved one: Song-joo's father died in a traffic accident and Jung-suh's mother died of eye cancer. Jung-suh's father (Ha Jae-young) marries an actress named Tae Mi-ra (Lee Hui-hyang), who brings her real daughter, Han Yoo-ri (Park Ji-Mi), and son, Han Tae-hwa (Lee Wan) into the household. Yoo-ri is jealous of Jung-suh, making her look terrible in front of her mother, who begins to turn on Jung-suh. When Jung-suh's father leaves for work, her stepmother assaults her. She thwarts Jung-suh's attempts to study abroad with Song-joo, who then leaves for America alone. Mi-ra plots for Yoo-ri to win the affections of Song-joo who is the heir of his family fortune. All the while, Jung-suh tries to be nice to Tae-hwa, but he mistakes her friendship for something more, and falls in love with her.

Three years later, Song-joo (Kwon Sang-woo) comes back from America, and Jung-suh (Choi Ji-woo) rushes to greet him. A jealous Yoo-ri (Kim Tae-hee) tries to stop them from reuniting. As they race to the airport, Yoo-ri intentionally hits Jung-suh with her car. Jung-suh is then rushed to the hospital, where a group of people had just died in a fire. Yoo-ri swaps Jung-suh's ID with one of the fire victims to fake her death. She then takes the real Jung-suh to her biological father's home. Tae-hwa (Shin Hyun-joon), still in love with Jung-suh, finds out what Yoo-ri has done, but seizes the opportunity to run away with Jung-suh. Jung-suh loses her memory, and Tae-hwa moves her away and changes both their names.

Five years later, Yoo-ri is soon to be engaged to Song-joo. Song-joo decides that he needs to let go of Jung-suh and goes to the carousel they used to ride as children. He wishes to see Jung-suh just once more, looks up, and sees her on the carousel. Jung-suh, now named Kim Ji-soo, works at a small clothing shop while living with Tae-hwa (now Chul-soo). Song-joo rushes to Ji-soo and tells her that she is Jung-suh, but she doesn't believe him. Song-joo is determined to make her remember her past, and through a series of events, he and Jung-suh become close.

Jung-suh regains her memory when Yoo-ri nearly hits her with her car again and rushes to tell Song-joo. She forgives Tae-hwa as she knew he did it out of love. Jung-suh and Song-joo are happy together, until she discovers she has eye cancer. She asks Tae-hwa to take her away from Song-joo, since she can't bear to see him in pain. Gradually, Jung-suh's vision deteriorates into blindness. Tae-hwa tells Song-joo and his family the truth starting from the accident. Yoo-ri is arrested, and her mother, who goes insane, is admitted to a mental hospital.

Song-joo marries Jung-suh, who is now blind, with the blessing of his mother and her father. Jung-suh tells Tae-hwa that her one wish is to see Song-joo's face one last time. Both Song-joo and Tae-hwa ask a doctor to let them give Jung-suh one of their corneas, but the doctor tells them that they can't take corneas from live donors. Tae-hwa, wanting to grant her wish at all costs, commits suicide to donate his cornea to her. After his death, Jung-suh has the operation and is able to see again. However, Song-joo finds out about Tae-hwa's death and later on tells Jung-suh. She starts to feel sick again, and the doctor states that the tumor has spread to her brain and is inoperable; the same incurable illness that killed her mother. Jung-suh, realizing this, forgives Tae Mi-ra and Yoo-ri because of Tae-hwa. Both Yoo-ri and Tae Mi-ra feel remorse for their wrongdoings against Jung-suh, and apologize to her. Jung-suh dies a few days later at the seaside near her childhood home, in the arms of Song-joo. The ending scene reverts to the beginning scene where Song-joo is playing his piano by the ocean of the memorable beach house. He says, "Perhaps, that person (Tae-hwa) might have loved that girl (Jung-suh) more than I. But even though I say this, that doesn't mean that I loved her any less."

== Cast ==
=== Main ===
- Choi Ji-woo as Han Jung-suh / Kim Ji-soo
  - Park Shin-hye as young Jung-suh
- Kwon Sang-woo as Cha Song-joo
  - Baek Sung-hyun as young Song-joo
- Shin Hyun-joon as Han Tae-hwa / Han Chul-soo
  - Lee Wan as young Tae-hwa
- Kim Tae-hee as Han Yoo-ri
  - Park Ji-mi as young Yoo-ri

=== Supporting ===
- Ha Jae-young as Han Su-ha (Jung-suh's father)
- Lee Hwi-hyang as Tae Mi-ra (Tae-hwa and Yoo-ri's mother)
- Jung Han-yong as Han Pil-su (Tae-hwa and Yoo-ri's father)
- Lee Charm (Bernhard Quandt) as Director Jang
- Kim Ji-sook as Min Seo-hyun (Song-joo's mother)
- Park Young-ji
- Jung Ha-na
- Lee Tae-sung

== Production ==
Recreation complex Lotte World in Seoul was used as a filming location, namely the carousel, ice rink and as the seat of Cha Song-joo's family business.

== Soundtrack ==
1. Chopin's Piano Concerto No. 1 Op.11 E Minor 2nd Mvt : Romanza
2. Memories of Heaven (천국의 기억; Cheongugui gieok) – Jang Jung-woo
3. Lethe (레떼; Rette) – Kang Woo-jin
4. Ave Maria – Rebecca Luker
5. That's the Only One (그것만은; Geugeonmaneun) – Jang Jung-woo
6. Forever (언제까지나; Eonjekkajina)
7. Only Me For You (나만의 너; Namanui neo) – Kim Hyun-ah
8. Remember
9. Sad Love (슬픈 사랑; Seulpeun sarang)
10. To the Beautiful You (아름다운 너에게; Areumdaun neoege) – Moon Ji-hwan
11. I Will Protect You (너를 지킬께; Neoreul jikilkke)
12. I Miss You (보고싶다; Bogosipda) – Kim Bum-soo
13. This is Not the End (끝이 아님을; Kkeuchi animeul)
14. Memories of Heaven (천국의 기억; Cheongugui gieok) – Park Mook-hwan
15. Though I Am at the End of the World (세상 끝에 서 있어도; Sesang kkeute seo isseodo)
16. Promise (약속; Yaksok)
17. That's the Only One (그것만은; Geugeonmaneun) – Park Mook-hwan
18. Stairway to Heaven
19. Bania u cygana – Zero

== International broadcast ==
In 2004, the broadcast rights were sold to Japan for appropriately ₩1.2 billion, at the time a record price for a Korean drama export. It aired as part of Fuji TV's "Saturday Hallyu Wide Hour" programming block. The first episode received a viewership rating of 6% to 8% and went on to receive ratings as high at 12%. It also aired on cable channel KNTV from 4 June to 29 October 2005. According to a poll conducted by TV Asahi variety show SMAP Station in May 2007, Stairway to Heaven ranked as the third most popular Korean drama in Japan.

It aired in Vietnam on HTV9 from May 2 to June 27, 2004. It also aired in Hanoi Radio Television from 1 November to 27 December 2004.

It aired in the Philippines on GMA Network from January 17 to April 8, 2005, during which it received a peak viewership rating of 41.5% and an average viewership rating of 36.1%, making it one of the highest rated programs of all time in the country. The series became a rerun after 10 years from 28 September to 27 November 2015 which transferred to morning from primetime on the same network. The series was rebroadcast on GMA News TV from November 23, 2020 to January 1, 2021 and was re-aired on Heart of Asia, starting mid-week of September 2021 until October.

In 2005, broadcasting rights to the drama were sold to eight countries across Latin America including Mexico, Peru and Costa Rica.

It aired in Thailand on Channel 3 in 2006.

It was aired in Indonesia on Indosiar in 2004 and became one of the most popular Korean drama at the time.

== In North Korea ==
The show was popular among North Koreans. Allegedly, the show was seen by North Koreans via smuggling, as they wanted an alternative to watching North Korean state propaganda.

== See also ==
- Stairway to Heaven, a 2009 Philippine remake
- Cinta Sejati, a 2011 Indonesian remake
- Лестница в небеса, a 2016 Russian remake
- ឋានសួគ៌ស្នេហ៍, a 2016 Cambodian remake
