= Showbiz Extra =

South Korean television news show

Showbiz Korea is a daily television entertainment news show that covers the South Korean entertainment industry broadcast in South Korea and throughout Asia on Arirang TV, which premiered on April 10, 2002. The show is produced in Korea, but broadcast in the English language. It's also available on Viki with subtitles in multiple languages.

The show features segments that include "Showbiz Today" about the latest issues facing the Korean entertainment industry; "K-Chitchat" that features a panel of experts discussing the latest Korean entertainment issues; "Stars' Big Match" that highlights stars gaining worldwide fame; "Fashion 101" that explores fashion and beauty trends of Korean celebrities' "Issue Makers" that spotlights stars in the news this week; "Film Digest" that features the latest movie releases; and "On Scene" that takes you on filming sets, press conferences and showcases.

== Hosts ==
Lina Kwon, Brian Joo, Austin Kang, Adrien Lee, Jasper Cho
