= Filipino Korean =

Filipino Korean or Korean Filipino may refer to:

- State-to-state relations between the Philippines and North or South Korea; see:
  - Foreign relations of North Korea
  - Foreign relations of South Korea
  - Foreign relations of the Philippines
- Koreans in the Philippines
- Filipinos in South Korea
- Multiracial people of mixed Filipino and Korean descent:
  - Kopino
  - Kosian, a more general term covering people of Korean and other Asian descent
