= Filipino South Korean =

Filipino South Korean or South Korean Filipino may refer to:

- Philippines–South Korea relations
- Filipinos in South Korea
- South Koreans in the Philippines
- Mixed race people of Filipino and South Korean descent
