= Philippines–South Korea relations =

- South Korea: Philippines

Diplomatic mission
- Embassy of the Philippines, Seoul: Embassy of South Korea, Manila

Envoy
- Ambassador Maria Theresa Dizon-De Vega: Ambassador Lee Sang-hwa

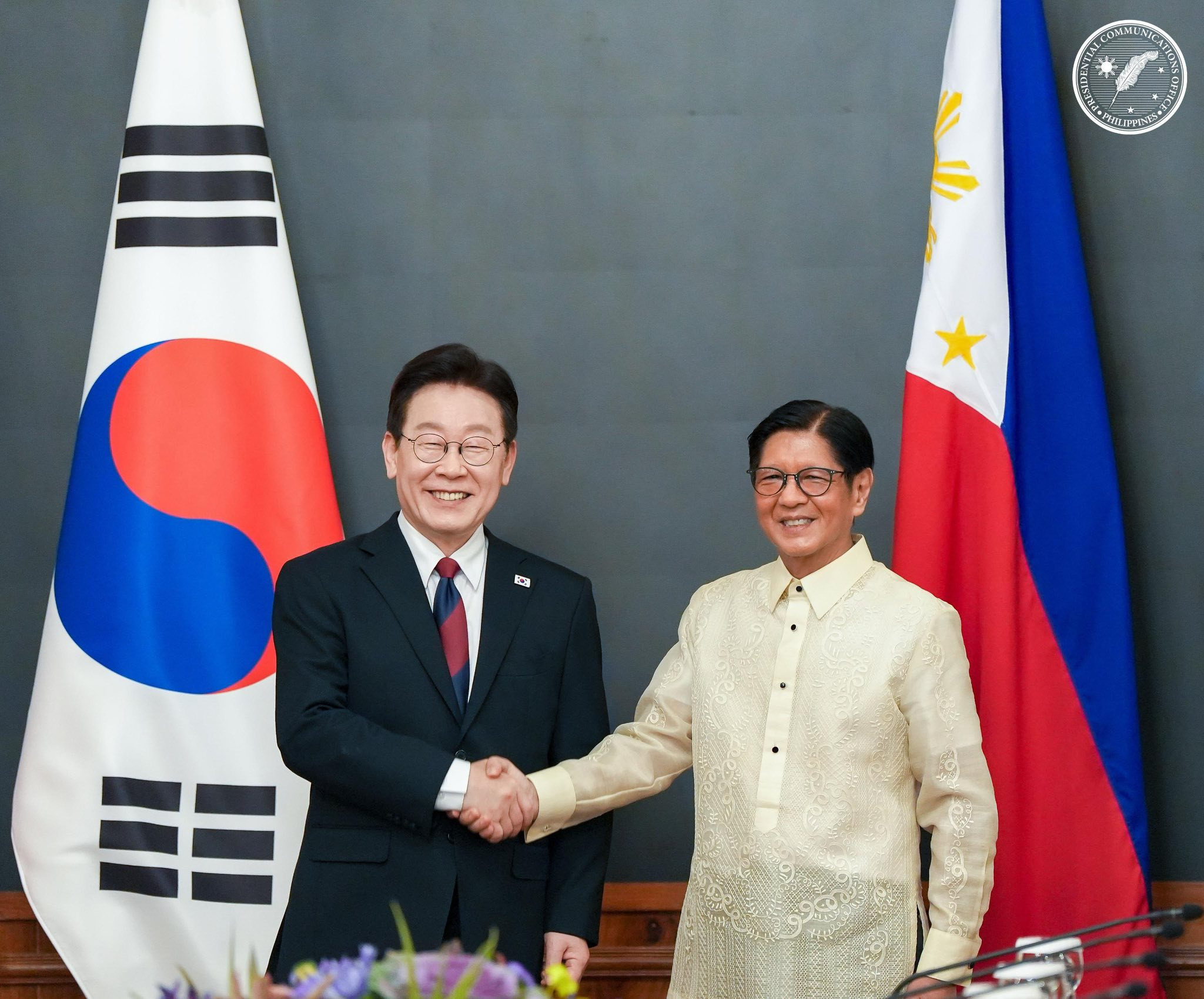
President Lee Jae Myung shaking hands with President Bongbong Marcos in 2026

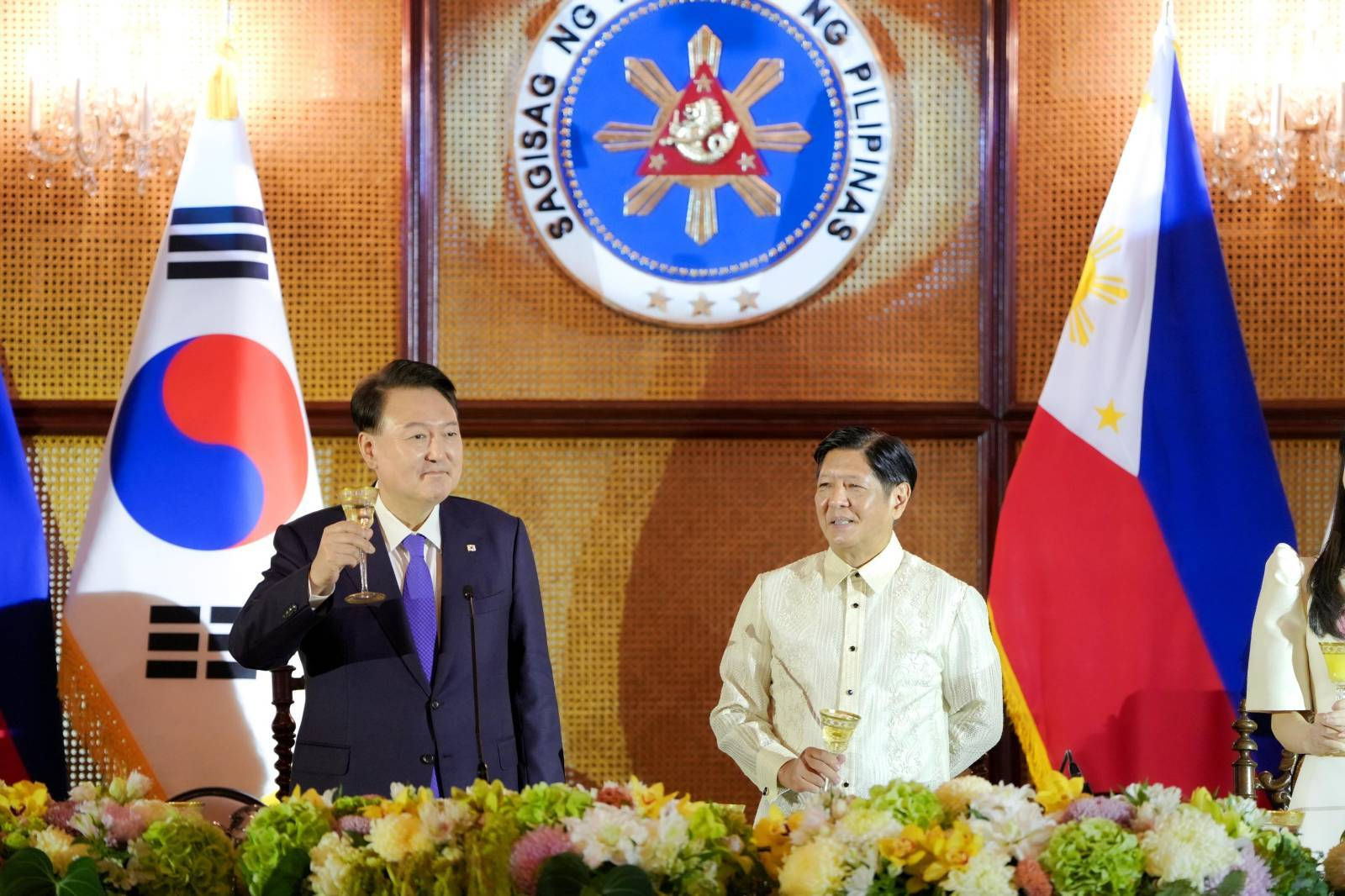
President Yoon Suk Yeol offering a toast to President Marcos in 2024

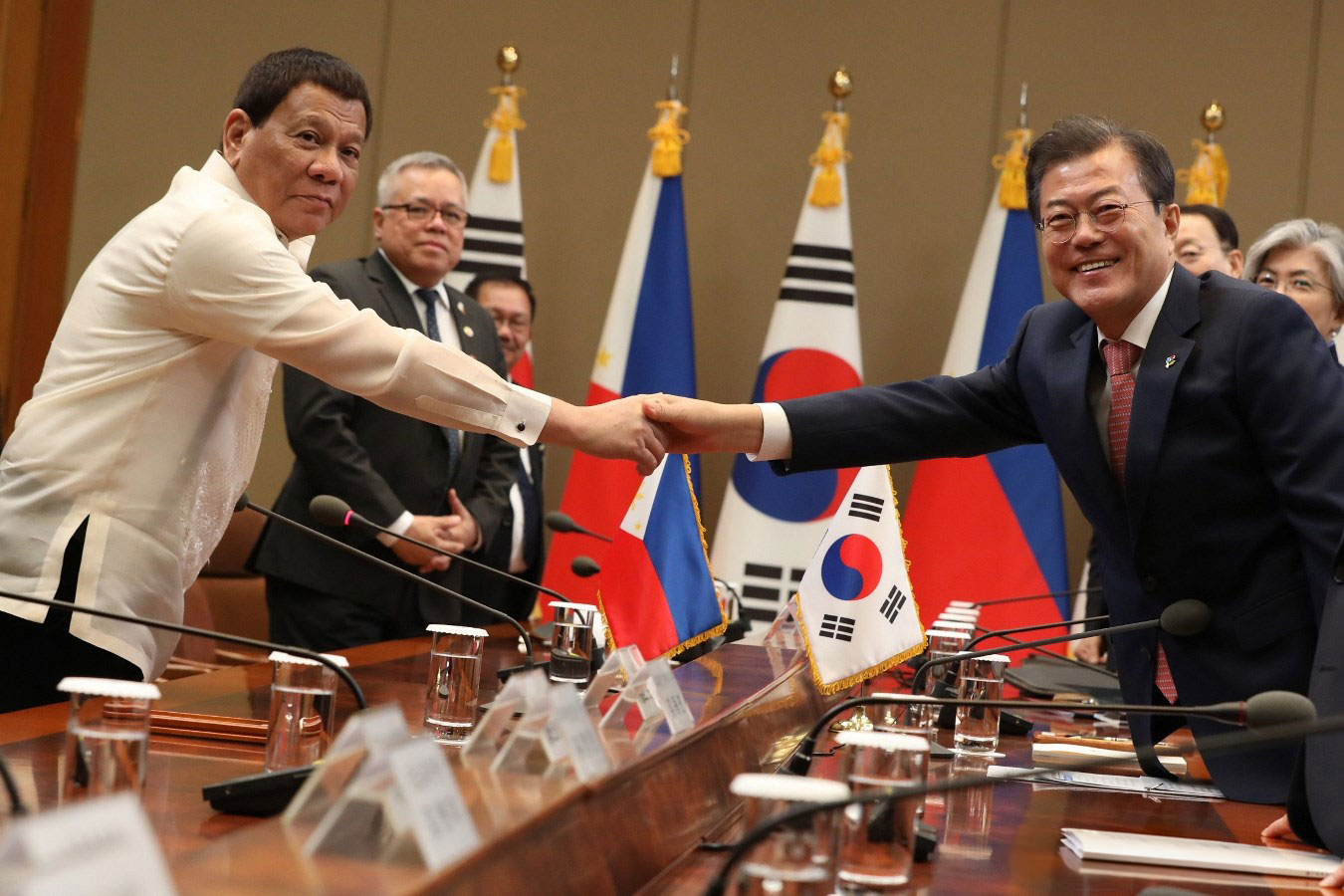
President Rodrigo Duterte shaking hands with President Moon Jae-in in 2018

The Philippines–South Korea relations (Korean: 대한민국-필리핀 공화국 관계; Hanja: 大韓民國-필리핀 共和國 關係; RR: Daehanminguk–Pillipin Gonghwaguk Gwangye; Filipino: Ugnayang Pilipinas at Timog Korea) are the bilateral relations between the Republic of the Philippines and the Republic of Korea. The Philippines has an embassy in Seoul, while South Korea has an embassy in Taguig. The relationship between the Philippines and South Korea can be classified as strong as the two countries have historically been and continue to be close diplomatic and military allies. They are also significant economic partners in terms of trade, immigration, and tourism. They are both close allies of the United States.

== History ==
Moon Soon-deuk, considered as Korea's first person to learn a Philippine language (i.e. the Ilocano language), was able to use his interpretation skills conversing with the five Filipinos who were shipwrecked off Jeju Island in 1801 and were able to return home after nine years. He was the first recorded Filipino interpreter in Joseon dynasty.
Moon, a survivor of shipwreck himself, was a ray merchant who lived on Ui Island, drifted to Japan's Okinawa Island with his uncle and four other colleagues, and then ended up seeing the Philippines, Macao and China. They were hit by the typhoon while on their way home from another island nearby after purchasing some fish known as "hongeo". Moon had a flair with foreign languages as he acquired the language in Yeosong (Luzon) - possibly Ilocano language, and had a sharp eye for the way the people lived. He was able to describe the towns, churches, houses, and how people prepared food in the northern Luzon region.

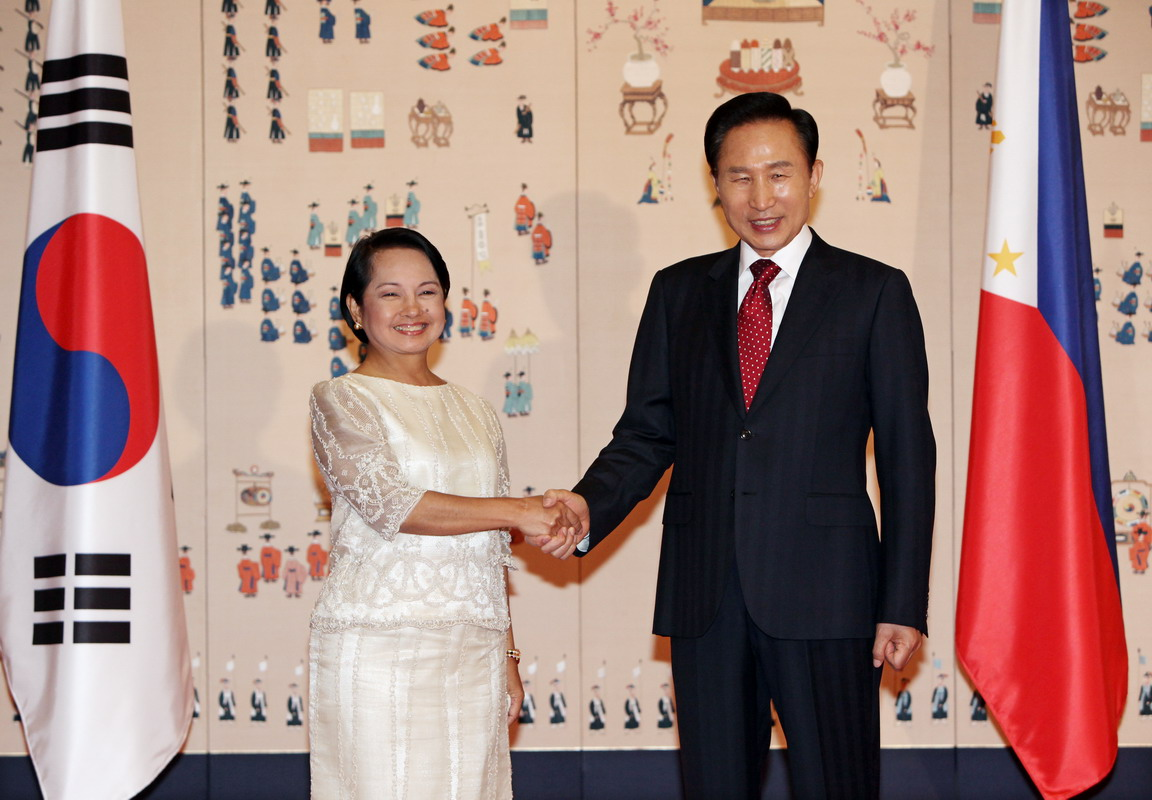
President Gloria Macapagal Arroyo shaking hands with President Lee Myung-bak in 2009

During World War II, the Japanese forcefully imported Korean soldiers to the Philippines to serve Japan's occupation from 1944 until the end of the war. During this time, Koreans were branded as "more cruel than the Japanese", however, a study published in 2012 found these rumors to be baseless. Only 2 Korean soldiers were ever convicted of war crimes in the Philippines. The study notes that the rumors may have likely been spread by the Japanese throughout the islands to incur hate against ethnic Koreans during and after the war. Bilateral relations between South Korea and the Philippines were established on March 3, 1949, upon the recognition of Republic of Korea as a sovereign state by the Philippines. The Philippines was the fifth state to recognize the Republic of Korea and the first ASEAN country to establish relations with the new nation. During the Korean War (1950–1953), the Philippines sent its forces to aid South Korea. It was the first Asian country to respond to the call of the United Nations (UN) to help South Korea when it was invaded by Chinese and North Korean communist forces.

As of 2009, there were 45,000 Filipinos residing in South Korea. In 2011, the South Korean Ministry of Foreign Affairs and Trade conducted a census and found that there were more than 90,000 South Koreans living in the Philippines, a fall of 16% from 2009 after a period of rapid growth in the population in the preceding decade. In 2017, civilian groups in the Philippines and South Korea joined forces to push for the inscription of Voices of the ”Comfort Women” in the UNESCO Memory of the World Programme. The inscription, however, was blocked by Japan.

The Republic of Korea Air Force Black Eagles aerobatic team led by 8 T-50B jets and Philippine Air Force’s 4 FA-50H light combat fighters per Gilbert Teodoro flew together on March 3, 2024 to hold a free 3-day Clark Air Base “Black Eagles Airshow and Friendship Flight” for the 75th anniversary of the diplomatic relations between the Philippines and South Korea.

== Economic relations ==
South Korea is the sixth biggest trading partner of the Philippines, while the Philippines is the third most attractive Southeast Asian country for South Korean investors in 2011. South Korea also provides the biggest tourist market for the Philippines. In 2011, Koreans topped the list of tourists in the Philippines, followed by Japanese and Americans. In October 2024, President Ferdinand "Bongbong" Marcos Jr. acknowledged the importance of Korean culture to the Filipinos: "with Korean restaurants sprouting out around the Philippines, Filipinos have shared stories and have laughed over some kimchi, some samgyeopsal with friends and family, and of course, the countless hours we have spent binge-watching our favorite Korean dramas and listening to K-pop. This highlights how the Filipinos love Koreans."

On the last day of 2024, a free trade agreement between the two states which was signed by their respective leaders on September 7, 2023 took effect, after it was ratified by the Senate of the Philippines three months earlier.

On 10 September 2025, Lee ordered the suspension of a development loan for bridge construction in the Philippines after reports showed it had been revived under political pressure despite earlier rejection over corruption risks. The Philippines had originally requested a ₩586 billion (US$439 million) loan from the Economic Development Cooperation Fund in 2023 to finance the project, which aimed to build 350 bridges by 2028. The Ministry of Economy and Finance rejected the loan in February 2024, citing graft concerns and low chances of success, but the plan was later revived after lobbying by lawmaker Kweon Seong-dong, who later faced arrest in a political funds scandal, leading Lee to halt the project and commend the media for exposing irregularities. In response, the Philippine Department of Finance said that no such loan with South Korea existed.

== Military relations ==
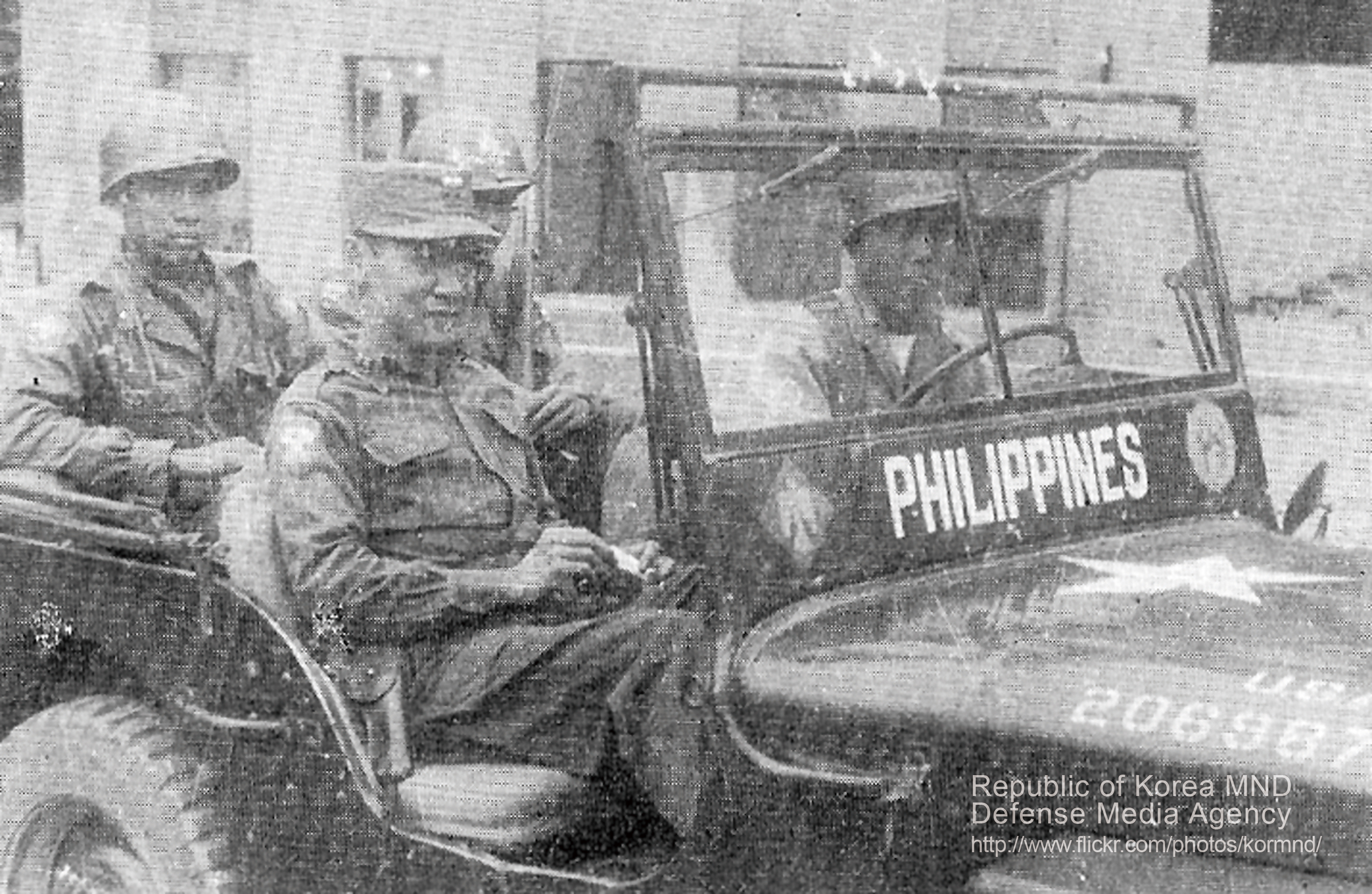
Filipino troops arriving at Busan during the Korean War

Military relations between the two countries started during the Korean War when the Philippine government sent troops to enforce the United Nations campaign against the communist coalition of North Korea and China.

South Korea is an active arms donor and supplier for the Armed Forces of the Philippines.

They have donated numerous military hardware to the Philippines in the past, such as a number of F-5A/B fighter jets for the Philippine Air Force. These planes have since been decommissioned, but not before seeing ample use in the latter's domestic military operations against communist and Muslim separatist insurgents. In addition to this, South Korea had also donated a number of T-41 trainer planes.

In 2014, South Korea donated the ROKS Chungju, a Pohang-class corvette, to the Philippine Navy. She was handed over, refitted, and commissioned as the BRP Conrado Yap (PS-39) on August 5, 2019.

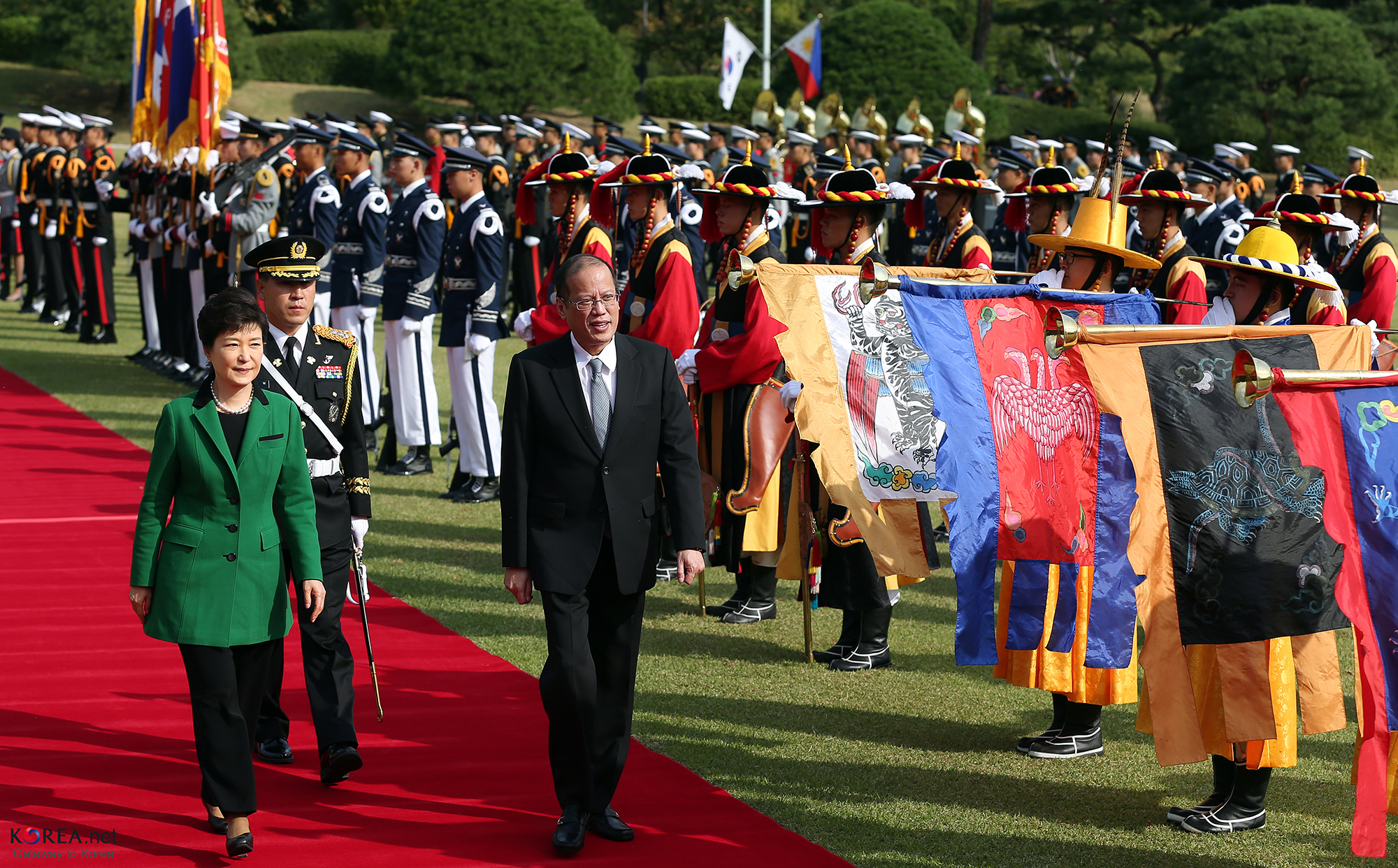
President Park Geun-hye and President Benigno Aquino III in Blue House

The South Korean government also actively fulfills contracts for the Philippines for a variety of military hardware. These range from small arms, armored tactical vehicles, missile frigates, to multirole fighters.

In 2017, South Korea delivered the last batch of the 12 FA-50 Fighting Eagle light fighter jets ordered by the Philippines.

On October 16, 2018, Hyundai Heavy Industries laid down and began construction on BRP Jose Rizal (FF-150), the first missile frigate of her class and one of two that had been placed on order by the Philippine government. She was launched on May 23, 2019, and commissioned in May of the following year. Laying down and construction of the next missile frigate, BRP Antonio Luna (FF-151), also began on May 23, 2019. She was launched on November 8, 2019, and commissioned on March 19, 2021.

== Controversies ==
In 2012, the first naturalized Korean lawmaker with Filipino descent received backlash from racist and xenophobic Korean netizens. The attacks were focused on the lawmaker's Filipino ethnic background. In 2016, a South Korean businessman was kidnapped and killed by rogue cops in the Philippines who accused him of being involved in the illegal drug trade. The Philippine government has apologized for the incident. In July 2020, a Philippine envoy resigned after allegedly sexually harassing a Korean woman in 2019. In September 2020, online conflict sparked between the two nations over Korean racism against Filipinos. A Filipino wore clothing which looked like the Japanese rising sun. This angered many Koreans due to South Korea's history with Japan. Korean users spouted racist remarks over the skin color and other physical attributes of indigenous Filipinos.

== Gallery ==
=== Notable Places ===
South Korean Embassy in Taguig

Shrine of Saint Andrew Kim in Bocaue, Bulacan

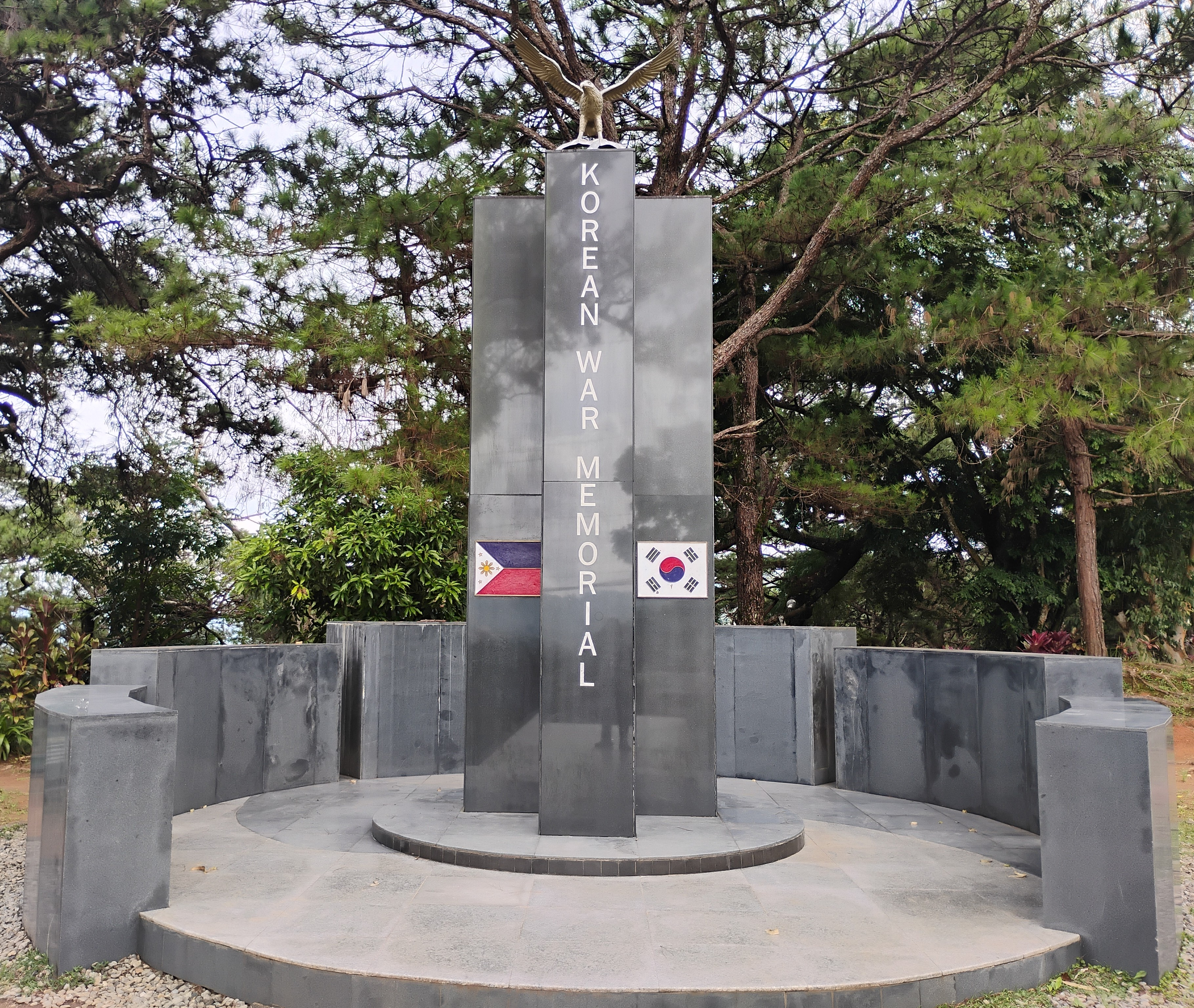
Korean War Memorial at the Philippine Military Academy in Baguio

=== Yoon's visit to the Philippines (2024) ===
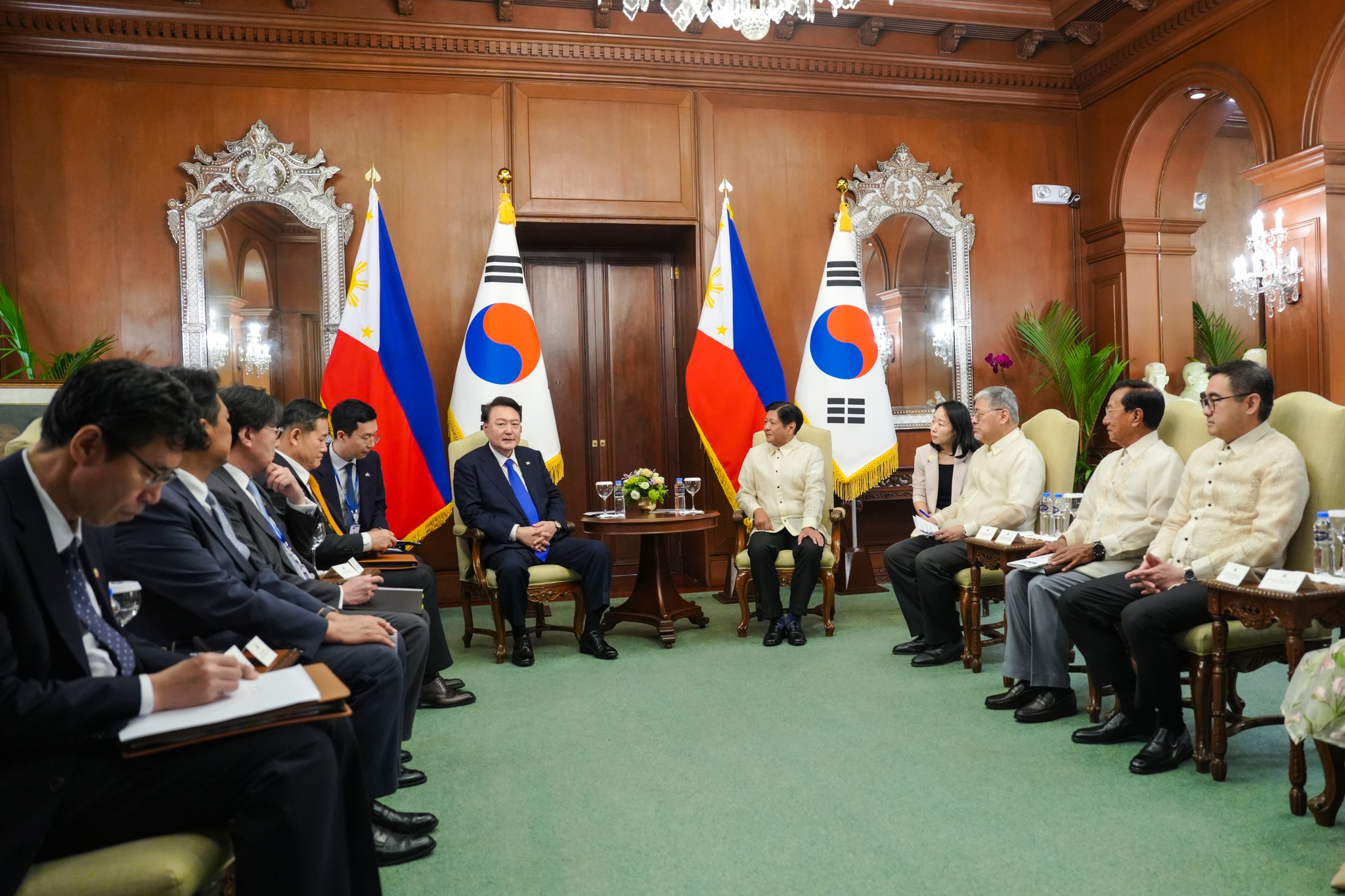

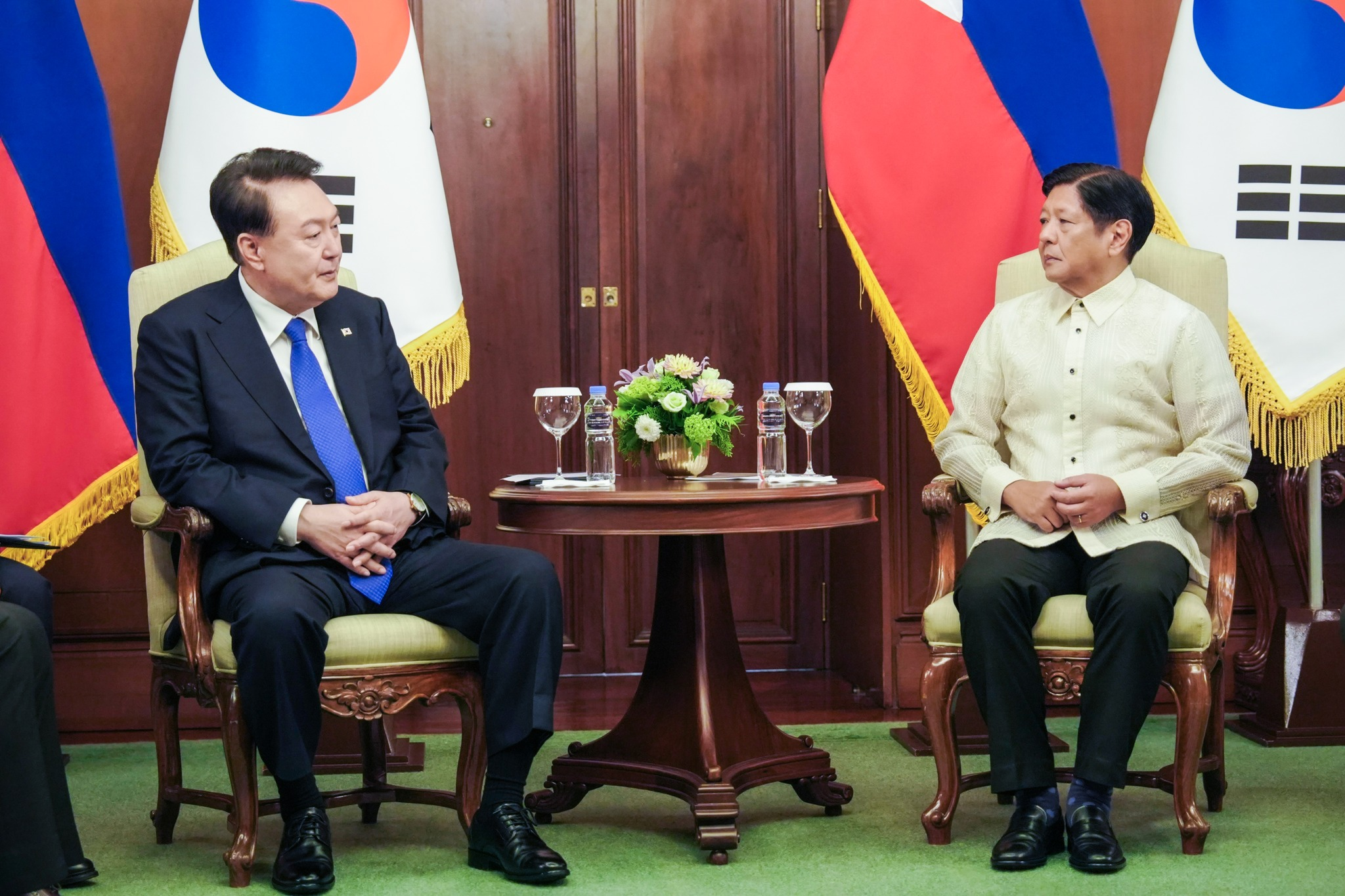

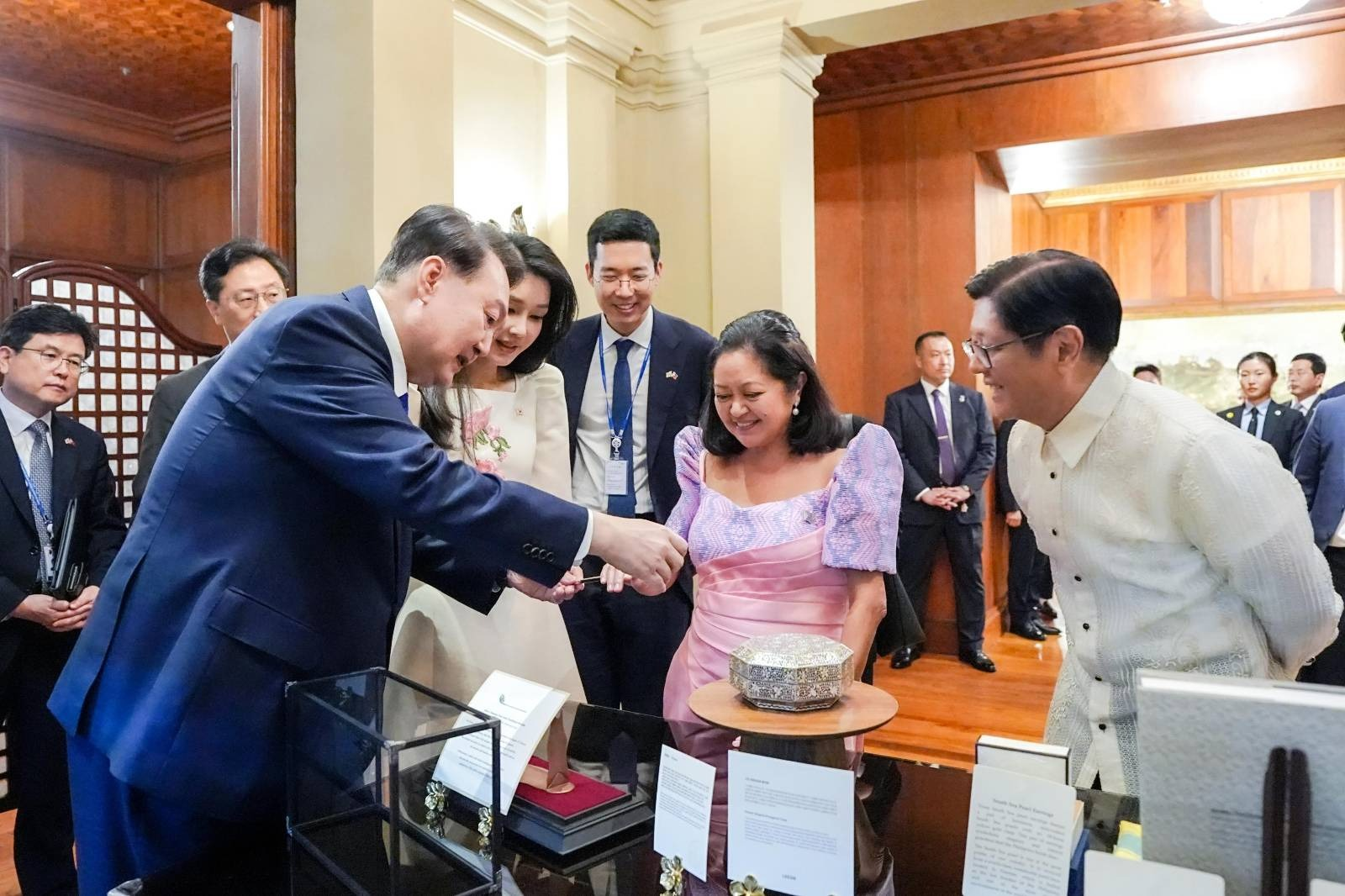

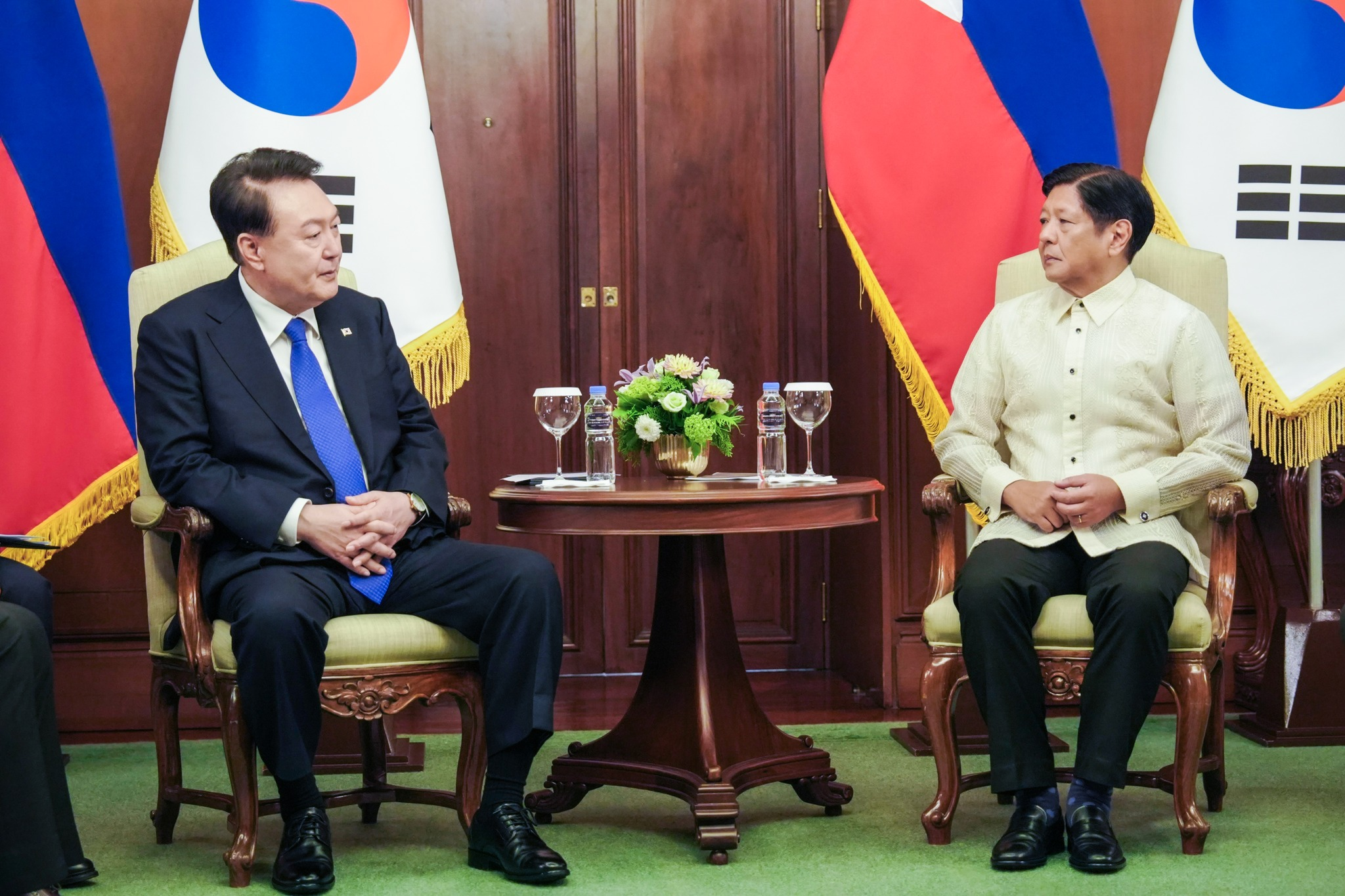

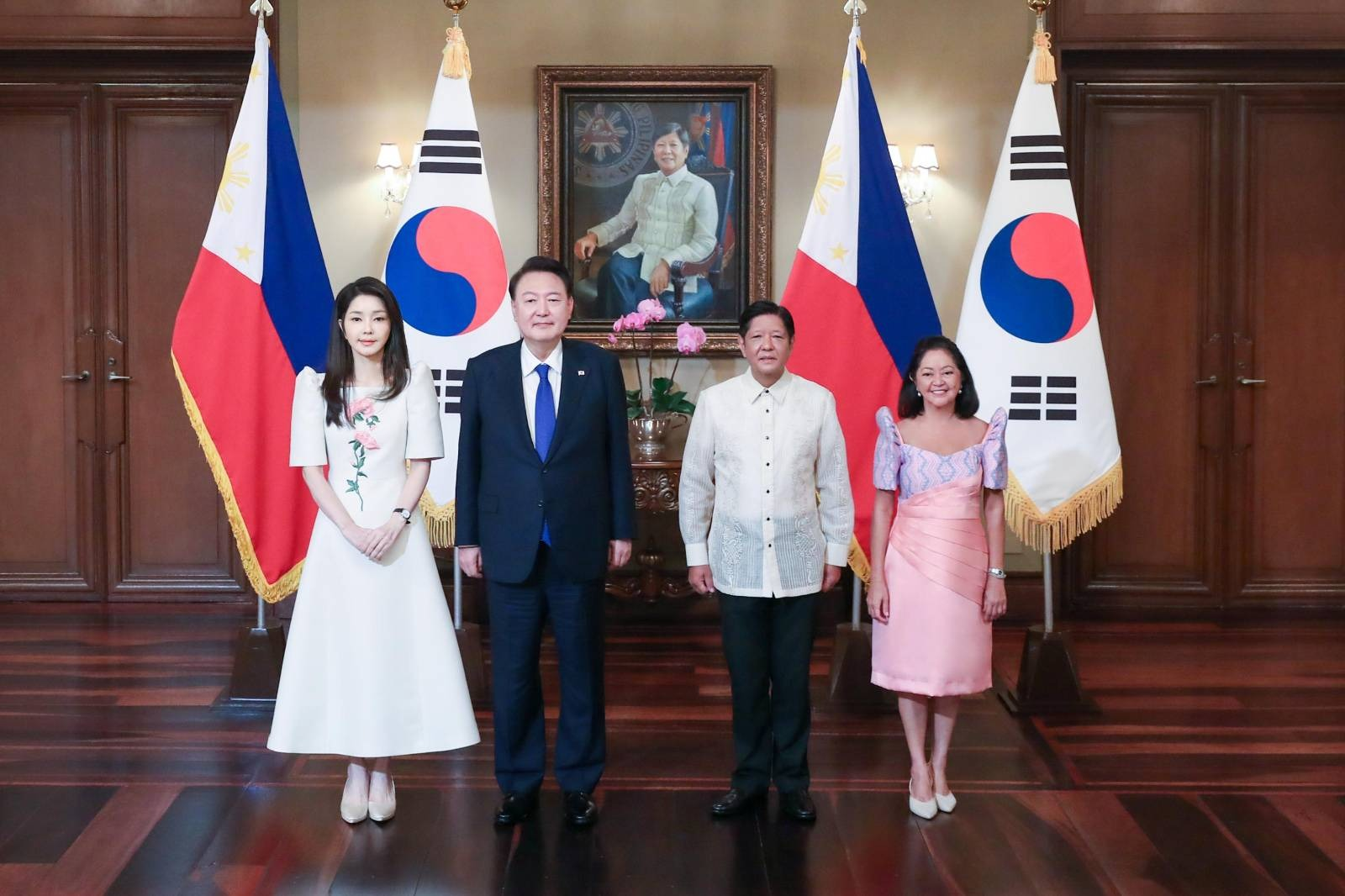

== See also ==
- Philippine Expeditionary Forces to Korea
- Filipinos in Korea
- Koreans in the Philippines
- South Korean television dramas in the Philippines
- Taft–Katsura Agreement
- Root–Takahira Agreement
- North Korea–Philippines relations
