= Filipinos in South Korea =

Ethnic group

- (Philippines) (South Korea)

Total population
- 63,000 (2015) (0.1% of South Korea's population); 41,000 (2004)

Regions with significant populations
- Seoul, Busan

Languages
- Filipino, English, Korean

Religion
- Roman Catholicism · Protestantism

Related ethnic groups
- Overseas Filipinos

Filipinos in South Korea have a history dating back to the establishment of South Korea. Many live in Seoul, where they gather in the Hyehwa-dong and Dongsung-dong areas of Jongno-gu.

Filipinos are living all over South Korea, but specific neighborhoods have become their main community centers and gathering spots.

Within Busan, although Filipinos live across different parts of the city, specific areas have formed community concentrations. In industrial complexes within Gangseo-gu, Sasang-gu, and Saha-gu, many migrant workers live near manufacturing and shipping-related factories, while others work in maritime and trade sectors in Yeongdo-gu and Jung-gu. On weekends, these dispersed populations tend to gather at specific hubs, such as the Foreigner Street in Choryang-dong near Busan Station, which features Filipino grocery stores and restaurants. Additionally, many gather at local churches like Choryang Church and Sasang Church to attend Tagalog masses.

In southern Gyeongsang Province, Gimhae serves as another significant residential and gathering hub for the Filipino community. Within the city, the Dongsang-dong and Seosang-dong areas, particularly the alleys around Dongsang Market near the Royal Tomb of King Suro, have formed a district known as the "Dongsang-dong and Seosang-dong Foreigner Street." On weekends, Filipino workers employed in nearby industrial complexes tend to gather in Dongsang-dong to visit local Filipino restaurants, purchase goods, and attend community meetings.

== Migration history ==
7,500 Philippine soldiers fought in the Korean War on the side of the United Nations. Among them was Fidel V. Ramos, future chief of staff of the Philippine military and later President of the Philippines. After the war, Filipino engineers and technicians workers were instrumental in South Korean reconstruction efforts. Filipino engineers built the Ministry of Culture office and the United States Embassy in Seoul. Filipinos also helped to introduce American computing technology to South Korea; the second president of IBM Korea appointed in 1968 was a Filipino named Mr. Reyes.

By the beginning of the 1990s, the rising economy of South Korea made the country a very attractive destination for Filipino workers looking for overseas labor opportunities. As South Korea transitioned to a developed country, many workers from developing countries with challenging economic circumstances sought migration as a way of “moving up to a higher social rank.” Whereas during the 1980s, South Korea could sustain its development without foreign laborers due to its cheap native labor force, by the 1990s, decreasing birth rates and the growing cost of labor forced South Korea to supplement labor shortages by bringing in foreign workers. Rural-urban migration also created a demand for cheap foreign laborers, as young Korean-native people moved to the city in search of better jobs and living conditions, creating labor shortages in 3D (Dirty, Dangerous and Difficult) jobs, especially in rural areas.

By 2004, the Philippines' Department of Foreign Affairs estimated the number of Filipinos in South Korea at 41,000, of whom 9,000 were undocumented. In 2006, the Philippines' Department of Labor and Employment signed an agreement with South Korea regarding Filipino migrant workers; the Korean side offered a minimum US$700 per month salary, which could rise as high as US$1,000 with overtime pay, would permit workers to remain in South Korea for up to three years, and offered preference to workers who had illegally worked in South Korea previously but departed the country voluntarily by the February 2004 amnesty deadline. Applicants would be pre-screened based on previous employment as well as educational and health certifications; those given preliminary approval would go on to take the Korean Language Proficiency Test administered by the South Korean government. The Philippine Overseas Employment Administration, which handled the pre-screening, was soon swamped with more than 200,000 applicants. By 2007, the Commission on Filipinos Overseas estimated that the number of Filipinos in South Korea had grown by more than 70% to 70,000; 6,000 held permanent residency, while another 14,000 - 15,000 were undocumented. In July 2007, the South Korean embassy, under pressure from Korean businessmen in the Philippines complaining of "harassment and extortion" by Philippine immigration officials, stopped issuing visas to Filipinos headed to South Korea for work.

== Marriage immigrants ==
=== Background ===
Along with migrant laborers seeking job opportunities in a richer country, socio-cultural contexts prompted international marriage migration from the Philippines to South Korea. Several push and pull factors fostered marriage migration between countries: push factors included “economic difficulty, poverty, unemployment, and political confusion in a migrant’s country of origin,” while pull factors included “greater opportunities, higher income levels, and political freedom.”

In the wake of urbanization and industrialization in South Korea, increased rates of rural-urban migration contributed to a demographic transition. These trends led to low birth rates (the lowest in the world at 1.15) and increased life expectancy (79.6), creating an ‘aging society’. The number of farm households decreased from 2,483,000 in 1970 to 1,194,000 in 2009 (51.9 percent decrease), while the overall farming population decreased from 14,422,000 in 1970 to 3,118,000 in 2009 (78.4 percent decrease). “The massive exodus of young rural people to the cities and industrial zones” resulted in a critical shortage of marriageable women in farming and fishing villages. At the same time, deeply rooted traditions of agrarian and Confucian Korean society forced the eldest sons to stay in the countryside to take care of their elderly parents. As a result, men outnumbered women in more rural regions, “especially among those of marriageable age, twenty-five to thirty-nine.” This growing imbalance of the sexes and the skewed population of young adults in rural South Korea lured foreign brides to the area.

To compensate for the paucity of female partners in rural areas, the Korean government spearheaded campaigns to recruit foreign brides, “relying heavily on international marriage brokers.” The governmental intervention of promoting international marriage to solve the demographic problem started with the 1970s ‘New Village Movement.’ In the 1980s, the Korean government implemented a ‘rural bachelors get married’ movement to lure foreign brides into South Korea, and the campaign was continued in the 1990s under the active supervision of the Ministry of Gender Equality and Family. Most brides came from China (approximately 60%), followed by Vietnam. Others came from East Asian countries including Japan, Mongolia. Also Philippines, Pakistan, and Bangladesh.

== Problems ==
=== Gender inequality ===
Due to the traditions of agrarian and Confucian social norms, eldest sons were pressured to stay in rural areas to take care of their elderly parents, while urbanization led young people to move to the cities for jobs. The exodus had “led to an imbalance of the sexes in the farming population,” necessitating the need of foreign brides from other, less developed, countries who were willing to marry these men.

With the rapid increase of Filipino female immigrants to South Korea, Minister Kim Kum Lae of the Ministry of Gender Equality and Family joined forces with the Commission on Filipinos Overseas to ameliorate the living conditions of these women in South Korea. Recently, they signed a “Memorandum of Understanding on Cooperation in Developing Capacities for the Resettlement and Adaptation of Filipino Marriage Immigrants and Promoting the Empowerment of Marriage Immigrants.” This memorandum emphasized the significance of empowering female marriage migrants, who are often the targets of social discrimination and marginalization. The conference held a seminar to help “Filipino spouses, mostly women, from 18-25 years old, married to Korean men, mostly 35 and up” successfully establish new roles as wives, in-laws, mothers and migrants in a new country. This intervention sought to empower Filipino women by addressing the inherent problems of differences in age, culture, and language.

The gender inequality and paternalism harbored in Korean society can be attributed to Confucianism, which is deeply rooted in traditional ideas about the Korean family. Koreans have long recognized the family as a pillar of society and “under the strong influence of Confucianism, Koreans also came to consider the harmony and continuity of the family as the basis for upholding the human community.” Such beliefs have led Koreans to harbor a “family-first” ideology, prioritizing the family over individual members, who are expected to make sacrifices for the sake of the whole family. This belief led Koreans to “espouse a form of collectivism” that requires the sacrifice of each individual. However, “the most essential component of the Confucian family ideology is the inequality of interpersonal relations based on gender and generation. It emphasizes and justifies the need to give the most decision-making authority to male elders and grant the least power to young female family members. Though this trend is rapidly changing due to various external forces working to change the ideology, most of the important decisions are still made by male members of the community, and the distribution of authority is still unequal between men and women.

=== Domestic violence ===
Pyong Gap Min extends the discussion of social tensions in Korean-Filipino marriages immigrants in his journal article, “Changes in Korean Immigrants’ Gender Roles and Social Status, and their Marital Conflicts.” He explicitly describes how “the participation of married women in the labor force increases the likelihood of marital conflict and marital instability. The wife’s long hours of paid work and her great contribution to the family economy increase the likelihood of marital conflict without the division of housework. New gender roles put pressure on her husband to spend more time on housework. This role reversal usually hurts the husband’s ego, which may lead to marital tensions and domestic violence, particularly when the husband maintains traditional [Confucian] gender beliefs.”

He also argues that the Confucian patriarchal system, in combination with other structural forces in the Korean community, helps to perpetuate the patriarchal ideology. This persistence of traditional gender norms in an era, in which gender roles are drastically transforming, leads to domestic violence within multi-cultural families. The tension between different genders is more drastic and paternalistic in multi-cultural immigrant families, because of cultural differences and pursuant conflict. As competing notions of gender roles increase rates of domestic violence, marriage migrants’ satisfaction with life in South Korea is greatly impacted.

== Quality of life ==
=== National survey data ===
This survey was conducted in order to compare how multi-cultural families living in South Korea perceive and adapt to their new circumstances. The survey covered diverse topics, including, objective measures of quality of life such as marital status, income, and governmental support, as well as subjective measures of their quality of life such as a measure of personal satisfaction from 2009 to 2012. The Korean Women’s Development Institute was in charge of analyzing and developing the data, while the minister of the Ministry of Gender Equality and Family announced the results of the survey in 2012.

=== Objective indicators of quality of life ===
==== Family size and initial adaptation ====
During these years, the definition and range of what constitutes a multi-cultural family has changed. Since 2011, not only marriage immigrants, but also naturalized citizens were accepted as multi-cultural families eligible for governmental support. Between 2009 and 2012, the number of marriage immigrants and naturalized citizens who have been living in South Korea for 5 years has increased from 41.0% to 72.5%, while those who have lived less than 5 years decreased from 59.0% to 27.5%. In terms of marriage migrants’ initial adaptation during the first 5 years in South Korea, the percentage of couples getting divorced or separated within these first 5 years decreased from 53.1% to 37.8%. People getting divorced due to domestic violence significantly decreased from 12.9% in 2009 to 5.1% in 2012 as well.

==== Language proficiency ====
Korean language proficiency of marriage immigrants improved during the three years. The percentage of people reporting their improvement in speaking Korean increased by 20.1%, for reading 17.6%, and for writing 15.4%.

==== Employment and poverty reduction ====
The percentage of marriage immigrants who were employed increased 16.1% overall, with a 16.1% increase for women and a 6.0% increase for men. Moreover, in 2012, the percentage of female immigrants working as daily workers was 18.9%, while that of Korean women was only 7.0%. The poverty rate has decreased for multi-cultural families living in Korea for the last three years. While the percentage of families with a monthly income of 2000 dollars or less constituted 59.7% of the population in 2009, the percentage decreased to 41.9% in 2012.

However, while the employment rate has increased, the quality of jobs available did not increase. The national survey indicates that while the employment rate increased 4.5%, the percentage of female immigrants working as factory workers increased 8.3%, suggesting the need to focus on addressing the quality of work as well as the employment rate. Because the quality of work affects a marriage immigrant’s quality of life, it should be recognized that the rate of employment, by itself, does not fully explain women’s perception of changing gender norms in society. As such, a higher rate of employment among immigrant women, unlike other Korean women, does not directly reflect higher satisfaction with life, nor improved gender norms in South Korea. Most immigrants were working out of necessity, mostly for financial reasons, while their quality of work did not improve their quality of life.

==== Government policy ====
Among the population of marriage migrants and naturalized citizens, 71.4% knew or heard of multi-cultural family support centers and 46.2% got practical help, such as education or support from the centers. As the percentage of people using immigrant support centers has increased, the government has assumed that the roles of these centers and government supports were significant in bringing about positive changes. Whereas this study focused on government policy and legal aid as a main indicator of satisfaction on life, the national survey indicated that other objective indicators, such as education, language proficiency, and the employment rate all increased. During the 3 years in which government policies were actively implemented (2009 - 2012), domestic violence decreased 7.8%, language proficiency improved 20.1%, and the rate of poverty decreased 17.8%. In other words, objective indicators of the quality of life of these women definitely show improvement and advancement with higher satisfaction rates.

=== Subjective perceptions of quality of life ===
Social discrimination increased 4.9% between the three years. Work places were where female immigrants felt most discriminated against, followed by restaurants, banks, streets, neighborhoods, public institutions, and schools. There was also a 4.6% increase of marriage immigrants who said they felt lonelier. While in 2009 9.6% of these people felt lonely, in 2012, the rate increased to 14.2%. Social networking decreased as well. The percentage of marriage migrants who said they “don’t have a person to talk to when they are having a hard time” increased by 6.2%, from 15.5% in 2009 to 21.7% in 2012. Also, the percentage of migrants who have never participated in a local neighborhood meeting (which is very frequent in South Korea) increased by 14.5%, from 72.2% in 2009 to 86.7% in 2012. Despite increased Korean language proficiency, and an increased employment rate, social interaction decreased during the three years.

==== Causes of racial/social discrimination ====
Throughout Korean history, the degree of exclusionism against other ethnicities was summarized in the maxim “one blood, one nation.” ”The notion of an ethnically homogeneous and a racially distinctive unitary nation was developed and purposefully spread as Korea faced imperialist encroachments, in particular, in the early 20th century by the Japanese empire.” Even after the colonization, the notion was used politically by Korean President Park Chung-Hee to provoke and enable rapid economic development through strong social cohesion among people. However, national jingoism often allowed ethnic Koreans to become antagonistic to foreign immigrants. Such exclusionism is “often experienced by foreign-born Koreans, who report that they are mistreated or undertreated because of their accent or lack of Korean language proficiency.”

Sung argues that previous research has been biased in that it has been interested in and focused on studying difficulties in adjustment within a narrow scope, and with an increase of language proficiency and longer years of living in Korea, “migrant wives realize the gap between these expectations and their actual living conditions,” further leading to their disappointment and lowered expectations of life. Choi agrees, saying, “as for migrant wives in Korea, studies have documented that [those with a] higher level of education were more likely to perceive discrimination, resulting in a lower quality of life.” While government policies and support centers have mainly focused on teaching Korean to the immigrants, learning Korean could have exposed these immigrants to further discrimination, as they could finally start to understand what people said and wrote in Korean. Higher education and language proficiency are explained as factors that could affect the subjective perception of a higher discrimination rate. First of all, as women are more exposed to Korean society through their employment opportunities, they are more exposed to social discrimination. As supported by the data, social discrimination is the highest in working places (2.50), followed by restaurants (1.74), public places (1.53), and school (1.50).

While there is still a lot of debate on the cause of social discrimination, the discrepancy can also be due to government policies that are one-sided in their implementation, only focusing on making changes in the immigrants’ lives, without focusing on changing the perception of larger Korean society. While government support centers offer language classes for female immigrants, assist them with domestic violence, and fund them financially to improve the quality of lives, the larger Korean society remains unchanged in their perception of these women.

== Community and media ==
Filipino migrants in South Korea have established various cultural, academic, and media networks to support resettlement and community cohesion.

Faith-based groups serve as significant social hubs, most notably the Hyehwa-dong Filipino Catholic Community (HFCC), which hosts a weekly gathering and street market in Jongno-gu, Seoul. For academic and student networks, the Pinoy Iskolars sa Korea (PIKO) was established in 2006 as the official association for Filipino students in the country.

To address language barriers and provide centralized information, the diaspora has utilized community-run media platforms. These include historical websites like Sulyapinoy, managed by the Filipino EPS Workers Association (FEWA), as well as Pinoy Seoul (established in 2017), which provides community news, Korean language exam resources, and a 24-hour online broadcasting service, Pinoy Seoul Radio. Additionally, cultural representation is supported by events such as the Korea Pinoy International Film Festival to showcase migration narratives.

== Notable people ==
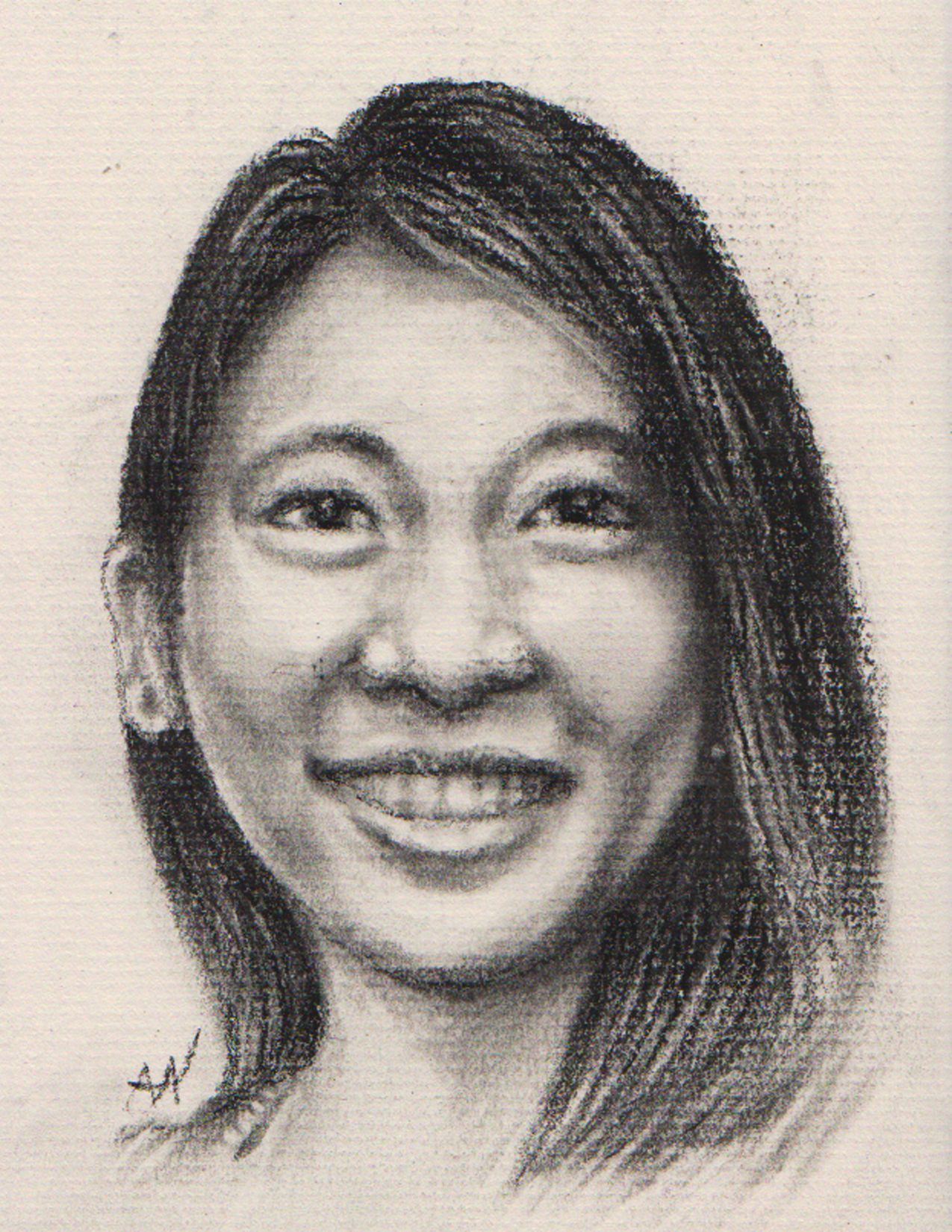
Jasmine Lee

=== Politics ===
- Jasmine Lee, South Korea's first naturalized politician

=== K-Pop Industry ===
- Kriesha Chu (크리샤 츄), K-pop idol and contestant of Kpop Star 6
- Chanty (born Chantal Videla), Filipino-Argentine actress, singer, dancer and member of Lapillus
- Hori7on, a South Korea-based All-Filipino Global Pop group. Composed of 7 members, namely: Vinci, Kim, Kyler, Reyster, Winston, Jeromy & Marcus
- Gehlee Dangca, Filipino model, beauty queen, singer, dancer and member of girl group, UNIS
- Elisia Parmisano, Filipino actress, singer, dancer and member of girl group, UNIS

=== Films ===
- Nash Ang, Filmmaker, actor

== See also ==
- Koreans in the Philippines
- Philippines–South Korea relations
