= Korea Pinoy International Film Festival =

2019 film festival in South Korea

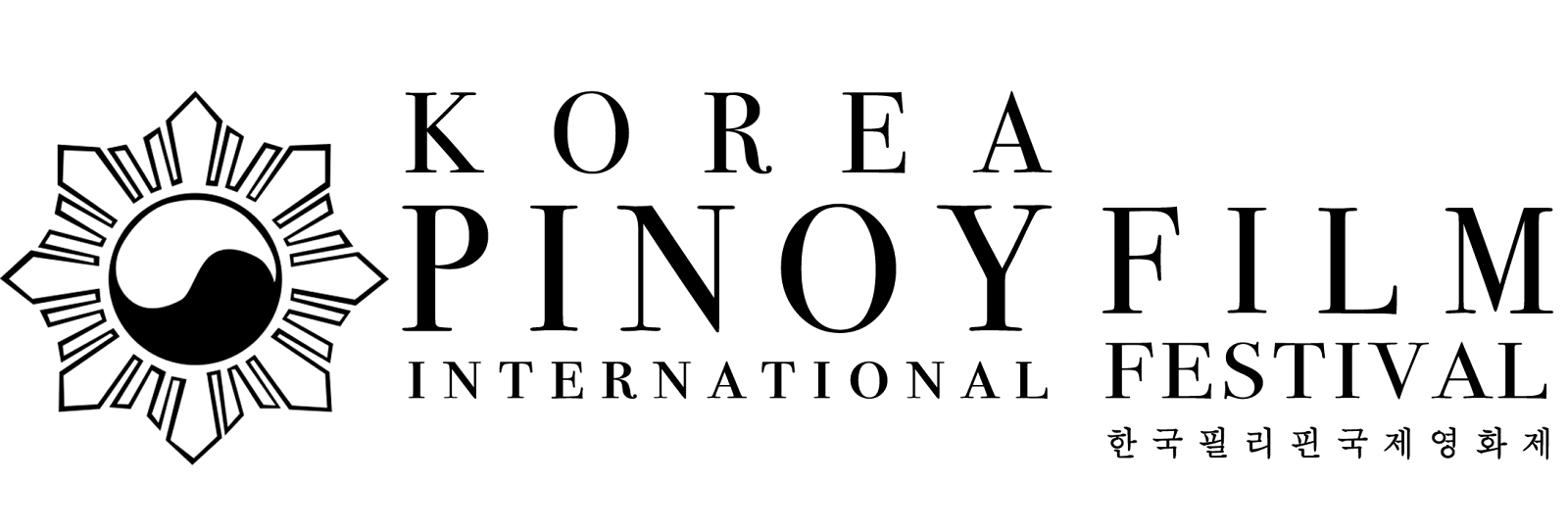
- Also known as: 한국필리핀국제영화제
- Theme: Migration
- Organized by: Pinoy Seoul, Pinoy Iskolars sa Korea, Pinoy Artists in Korea, Tanghalang Banyuhay, Seongbuk Multicultural Foundation

The Korea Pinoy International Film Festival (KPIFF) was a film festival held in Seoul, South Korea, from September 27 to 29, 2019. It was the first Filipino international film festival to be hosted in South Korea. The festival screened 28 short and feature films at the Arirang Cine Center in Seongbuk-gu, under the theme of migration.

The KPIFF was organized to celebrate the centennial of Philippine cinema and the 70th anniversary of diplomatic relations between the Philippines and South Korea.

== Background ==
The festival was conceived by Filipino filmmaker Nash Ang, who had been living in Seoul since 2012 as a scholarship student at the Korea National University of Arts (K-Arts). The Korea Herald had profiled Ang in 2012 as a filmmaker with "a cinematic eye for presenting heart-wrenching poverty with disarming frankness," noting his documentary work screened at the DMZ Korean International Documentary Film Festival and the Pyongyang International Film Festival. A two-time Ani ng Dangal awardee and director of the Filipino-Korean co-produced feature film Seoul Mates (2014), Ang served as festival director.

Planning for the festival began in early 2019. The Korea Times reported in April 2019 that Ang had secured partnership agreements with the Philippine Embassy in Seoul and the Seongbuk-gu district government, which made available the Arirang Cine Center's independent cinema hall for the event. Philippine Ambassador Raul Hernandez wrote to the venue's program director Boo Sung-iel requesting the use of the independent screening hall free of charge, and Boo agreed, noting the venue's previous success hosting a Bangladesh film festival.

The organizing committee included representatives from OBRA Incorporated's Pinoy Seoul, Pinoy Artists in Korea, FilAm Creative of Los Angeles, Tanghalang Banyuhay in the Philippines, and Pinoy Iskolars sa Korea (PIKO).

== Program ==
=== Feature films ===
The festival's opening film was The Secret of Philippine Peso by Perry Escano, starring Gelli de Belen and Ariel Rivera. Other feature films included You With Me, directed by Rommel Ricafort and filmed on location in Seoul, and Hello, Love, Goodbye, the top-grossing Filipino film of 2019 starring Kathryn Bernardo and Alden Richards, which received a special screening as the South Korea premiere. The closing film was The Bus, a Korean documentary drama about a Korean doctor who spends his remaining life treating children in the Philippines.

=== Short films and showcases ===
The program was divided into four categories: feature films, a short film selection, a directors' showcase, and a student films section branded "Best of Mapua."

The short film selection included works by Filipino and Korean filmmakers: Pas-an by Geraldo Jumawan and Sherwin Compendio, Whipped Cream Cake by Minju Hong, Ang Pagiging Babae by Nicole Rey, Safety by Stephanie Metcalf, How Beasts Got Hyped by Elvin Jay Macanlalay, You by Frances Irish Villaflor, A Blind, Mute and Deaf Family by Mark Justine Aguillon, Portal by Hadrein Damalerio, Pitaka by Chris Cahilig, Between Worlds: Filipino / Australian by Matthew Victor Pastor, and Ana Bikhayr by Hannah Ragudos.

The "Best of Mapua" section featured six student films from Mapua University's School of Media Studies.

== Reception ==
The festival attracted both Filipino residents and Korean attendees interested in Philippine culture and arts. The Korea Times described the event as significant for raising awareness of Philippine-Korean bilateral relations, noting that public commemoration of the 70th diplomatic anniversary had been "quiet in Korea" until Ang's initiative.

Festival director Ang told GMA News Online after the event: "I'm glad it turned out very well even with its shortcomings. With the theme of 'migration,' we aimed to achieve social inclusion of overseas Filipinos through cultural awareness of Philippine cinema across borders."

The event received coverage from South Korean English-language dailies The Korea Times and the Korea JoongAng Daily, as well as Philippine outlets GMA News Online and Radyo Inquirer.

== Partners and supporters ==
The KPIFF was held in cooperation with the Philippine Embassy in Korea and the Seongbuk-gu Government. Supporting organizations included the Seongbuk Multicultural Foundation, Pinoy Iskolars sa Korea, Tanghalang Banyuhay, Koreigners, Mapua University, Rotary Club of Dong Pocheon, Filam Creative Inc., Salad Multicultural Theater Company, and Pinoy Seoul Media Enterprise.

== See also ==
- Cinema of the Philippines
- Philippines–South Korea relations
- Hello, Love, Goodbye
