= Kidnapping and killing of Jee Ick-Joo =

2016 murder in the Philippines

- Part of the Philippine drug war
- Jee Ick-Joo
- Location: Kidnapping: Angeles City; Body discovered: Camp Crame, Quezon City
- Date: October 18, 2016
- Attack type: Kidnapping, extortion, homicide
- Deaths: Jee Ick-Joo
- Perpetrator: ca. 8
- Motive: extortion, robbery
- Accused: Ricky Santa Isabel, et al.

- Jee Ick-Joo
- Hangul: 지익주
- Hanja: 池益周
- RR: Ji Ikju
- MR: Chi Ikchu

Jee Ick-Joo (Korean: 지익주) was a South Korean businessman kidnapped by two policemen and later found dead on October 18, 2016, within the grounds of Camp Crame, the national headquarters of the Philippine National Police (PNP). A funeral parlor cremated his remains and flushed his ashes down a toilet. The policemen who kidnapped him were charged with kidnapping, carnapping, and homicide, while the officer who planned the attack was initially acquitted, but this decision was overturned on appeal in 2024 and he was convicted of kidnapping and homicide.

The chief of police, Ronald dela Rosa, offered to resign after the incident, but the president did not accept his resignation because he did not feel Rosa was responsible. Officials in the Philippines and South Korea cooperated in the investigation. The president of South Korea accepted an apology from the president of the Philippines.

== Killing ==
South Korean Jee Ick-Joo, a businessman, along with his house helper, was reportedly kidnapped by two unidentified men from Jee's residence in Friendship Plaza Subdivision, Angeles City, on October 18, 2016. After their arrest, the kidnappers—who turned out to be members of the Philippine National Police (PNP)—accused Jee of being involved in the illegal drug trade. Jee's wife, Choi Kyung-jin, made the statement that the kidnapper demanded a ransom of ₱8 million, and she reportedly paid ₱5 million on October 30, 2016. She said she did not give the kidnappers the remaining ₱3 million when they failed to present proof that Jee was still alive. The house helper was released the day after she and Jee were kidnapped.

Philippine authorities held an investigation into Jee's death, the result of which was relayed to South Korean authorities. The result of the investigation stated that Jee died due to strangulation, on the same day he was kidnapped, within the grounds of Camp Crame of the PNP. On January 17, 2017, the National Bureau of Investigation (NBI) went to a funeral parlor in Bagbaguin, Caloocan where the body of Jee Ick-Joo was believed to have been brought. His remains were cremated and his ashes were flushed down the toilet.

Jee Ick-Joo's wife said that eight armed men, including SPO3 Ricky Santa Isabel, who is linked to the PNP Anti-Illegal Drugs Group, were involved in the kidnapping. She alleged that the group took their personal property, including jewelry and passports. Jee's househelper was also named as a suspect by the Angeles city police after she was found to have used a false name and been working at Jee's household for only two days. The house helper is the main witness in the case.

On February 3, according to PNP Chief Ronald Dela Rosa, unscrupulous members of the PNP and NBI could be behind the killing of Jee. Dela Rosa told the reporters at Camp Crame that "the picture is getting clearer and hopefully, the truth will soon come out".

The suspects of the kidnapping and killing, including Supt. Rafael Dumlao III, SPO4 Roy Villegas, Jerry Omlang, Gerardo Santiago, and SPO3 Ricky Sta. Isabel, were arrested in 2017. In a January 29, 2017, late evening press conference, Dumlao was named by Rodrigo Duterte to be the mastermind in the abduction and murder and was given 24 hours to surrender. Four of them, except Sta. Isabel, entered not guilty pleas to the charges filed before Judge Irineo Pangilinan Jr. at the Regional Trial Court Branch 58 here on May 31, 2019. Judge Pangilinan ordered a plea of not guilty be entered into the court record for Sta. Isabel. Being detained in 2018 inside the jail facility of the National Bureau of Investigation (NBI) in Manila (Sta. Isabel and Omlang) and Camp Crame (Dumlao), the suspects requested to be transferred to the facility of the Bureau of Jail Management and Penology (BJMP) in Angeles City on the grounds of threats to their safety. In May 2019, the Angeles City Regional Trial Court (RTC) amended the hold departure order (HDO) it issued against the alleged mastermind Dumlao to cover all airports and seaports.

== Verdict ==
On June 6, 2023, Angeles City Regional Trial Court Branch 60 convicted SPO3 Ricky Sta. Isabel and former National Bureau of Investigation agent Jerry Omlang of the following:

- Kidnapping with homicide (death of Jee) and kidnapping with serious illegal detention (abduction of Jee's helper) with the sentence of reclusión perpetua or imprisonment of maximum of 40 years;
- Carnapping (using Jee's SUV to take the victim from his house in Angeles City to Camp Crame in Quezon City) with additional prison sentence of 22–25 years.

Meanwhile, the court acquitted the mastermind, Supt. Rafael Dumlao, of all aforementioned charges as the prosecution failed to prove his guilt. However, the prosecutors later sought the reversal of the decision through a petition for certiorari, which was granted by the Court of Appeals in July 2024. This gave Dumlao the same prison sentence for the kidnapping, yet ineligible of parole for homicide; as well as heavier one—30–35 years—for carnapping.

=== Interpol notice ===
On May 11, 2026, the Department of the Interior and Local Government announced that a Red Notice from the International Criminal Police Organization (Interpol) had been issued against Dumlao.

=== Arrest of Dumlao ===
Dumlao was arrested by the Criminal Investigation and Detection Group in a house at Pasong Tamo, Quezon City at around 5 a.m. on June 9, 2026 after a tipoff.

== Reaction ==
=== Philippines ===
PNP Chief Ronald dela Rosa offered to resign following the incident, but President Rodrigo Duterte did not accept the offer. Presidential spokesperson Ernesto Abella stated that Duterte did not accept the offer of resignation because he believed that dela Rosa could not be faulted for the killing since the suspected perpetrators were not part of his team, this while acknowledging that there is indeed corruption in the institution. At the time of the kidnapping, dela Rosa was in Beijing with the President for a state visit.

House Speaker Pantaleon Alvarez called for the resignation of dela Rosa over the incident to spare the Duterte administration from further embarrassment but revoked the call after Duterte said dela Rosa did not need to resign.

President Duterte apologized to South Korea for the incident, saying those responsible would be held accountable, additionally remarking that if imprisoned it would be best for them to escape, implying that he would have their heads sent to South Korea after being killed in prison.

Members of the South Korean community and sympathizers offered flowers and candles inside Camp Crame.

=== South Korea ===
The South Korean Ministry of Foreign Affairs summoned officials of the Philippine Embassy in South Korea to convey their deep concern over the killing of Jee Ick-Joo; no diplomatic protest was filed, however. The South Korean government, through its ministry, also called for the quick resolution of the case so that the perpetrators can be held accountable and to increase measures to ensure the safety of South Korean nationals in the Philippines. The Philippine Department of Foreign Affairs is cooperating with its South Korean counterparts over the case.

South Korea, through its ambassador to the Philippines Jae-Shin Kim, accepted an apology by President Duterte on January 26, 2017, but reiterated calls for the quick resolution of the case. The South Korean government expressed that they are making efforts to "control the damage" and "calm down the feeling of the people" following the incident. Acting South Korean President Hwang Kyo-ahn also accepted an apology conveyed by Chief Presidential Legal Counsel Salvador Panelo, who traveled to Seoul to meet with Hwang and personally convey the apology to him.

== See also ==
- Death of Rolando Espinosa
- Illegal drug trade in the Philippines
- List of kidnappings (2010–2019)
- Philippines–South Korea relations
