= Pinoy Seoul =

Media portal for Filipinos in South Korea

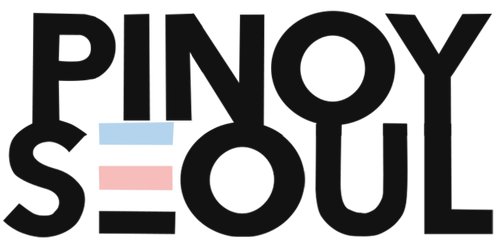
- Website type: Media portal and cultural platform
- Owner: OBRA Incorporated
- Founder: Nash Ang
- Website: www.pinoyseoul.com
- Launched: 2017

Pinoy Seoul (stylized as PinoySeoul) is an online media portal and cultural platform serving the Filipino migrant community in South Korea. Operated by OBRA Incorporated, the platform was established in 2017 to provide useful facts and information about life in Korea. In December 2019, the Commission on Filipinos Overseas (CFO) awarded the portal the Interactive Media Award for Best Website on Migration, recognizing its service to the Filipino diaspora.

== History ==
The platform was established in 2017 by filmmaker Nash Ang to provide a dedicated news outlet for South Korea's Filipino migrants. Within its first few months, the site registered 5,000 Facebook interactions and 10,000 Twitter followers. An online commercial platform, Pinoy Store, was integrated into the website in 2019 to offer Philippine products, with proceeds supporting community welfare initiatives.

=== Korea Pinoy International Film Festival ===
PinoySeoul organized the Korea Pinoy International Film Festival (KPIFF) in September 2019 at the Arirang Cine Center in Seongbuk-gu, Seoul. The program focused on the theme of migration, with 28 films screened during the event, including student works from Mapua University and Victor Villanueva's Saranghe my Tutor. The Philippine Embassy and the Seongbuk District Office co-hosted the festival, which commemorated both the centennial of Philippine cinema and the 70th anniversary of diplomatic relations between the Philippines and South Korea. The event was the first international Filipino film festival organized in South Korea, serving as a platform to highlight migration stories and cultural heritage.

=== EPS TOPIK Online ===
In 2018, the website introduced EPS TOPIK Online, a digital educational initiative and community designed to assist Filipino workers preparing for the Employment Permit System Test of Proficiency in Korean (EPS-TOPIK) examination. The program provides free online language review courses (known as the EPS-TOPIK Master Class), study guides, and digital tools such as salary calculators. As of 2026, the associated online community has grown to over 200,000 members, serving as a primary digital network for prospective overseas Filipino workers (OFWs) studying Korean.

=== Pinoy Seoul Radio ===
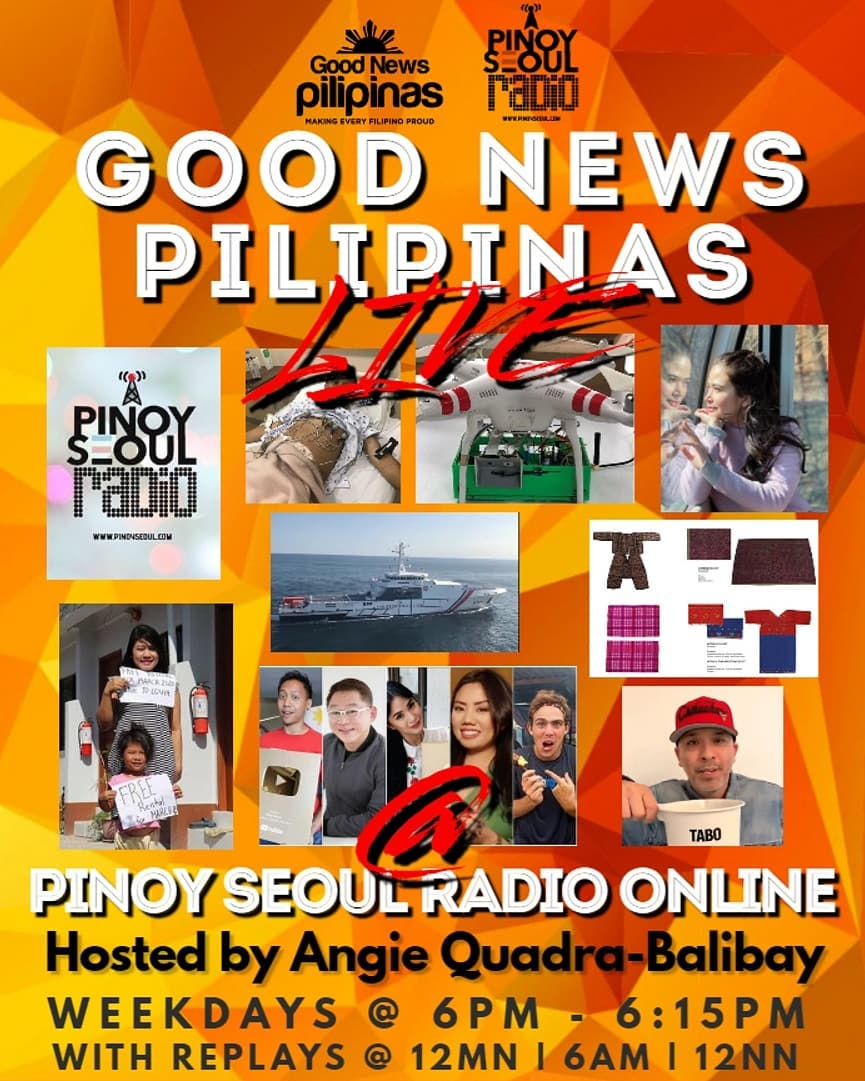
Good News Pilipinas Live at Pinoy Seoul Radio

During the COVID-19 pandemic, the platform introduced remote services to help the Filipino community cope with regional restrictions. On March 15, 2020, they established Pinoy Seoul Radio. This 24-hour online broadcasting service functioned as a critical communication channel, wherein listeners could avail of public health announcements, quarantine rules, and music. The station subsequently partnered with Good News Pilipinas to simulcast coverage of community relief efforts.

== Recognition ==
Following the 2019 Interactive Media Award, the Commission on Filipinos Overseas presented its founder with the 2022 Migration and Media Advocate Award, recognizing media work and advocacy initiatives supporting the Filipino community in South Korea.
