= Kosian =

A Kosian or Onurian (Korean: 코시안 or 온누리안; MR: K'osian or Onurian) is a person of mixed Korean parent and other Asian parent, or a family which mixes Korean and other Asian cultures. The term was first coined in 1997 by intercultural families to refer to themselves. The term is most commonly applied to children of a South Korean father and a Southeast Asian mother; its use spread in the early 2000s as international marriages became more common in rural areas. It is also used to refer to children of South Asian male laborers and South Korean women. The term is considered offensive by some who prefer to identify themselves or their children as Korean. Moreover, the Korean office of Amnesty International says that the word Kosian represents racial discrimination. Thus, The Korean Language Refinement Organization managed by National Institute of Korean Language suggest Onurian instead because of its negative effect on Korean society.

According to Pearl S. Buck International, there are approximately 30,000 Kosians in South Korea. Kosian children, like those of other mixed-race backgrounds in Korea, often face discrimination.

== Notable Kosians ==
- Dok2, rapper
- Wonho Chung, television personality and comedians
- Hwang Min-woo, child actor, dancer, and singer

== See also ==
- Demographics of South Korea
- Contemporary culture of South Korea
- Immigration in South Korea
