= South Korean television dramas in the Philippines =

In 2003, South Korean dramas began broadcasting in the Philippines. Successful Story of a Bright Girl was the first Korean drama aired in Philippine television. For more than two decades, GMA Network has aired a significant number of Filipino-dubbed Korean dramas broadcast in the Philippines.

== History ==
Since the 2000s, Korean television dramas are a regular source of entertainment in the Philippines. Huge demands from Filipino viewers prompted Philippine television stations to import South Korean programs. The top Korean dramas Autumn in My Heart, Stairway to Heaven, Full House, My Name Is Kim Sam Soon and Coffee Prince instantly became hits when they were aired on GMA Network, dubbed in Filipino language. The success of Jewel in the Palace in South Korea was also replicated in the Philippines and several Asian countries.

ABS-CBN's broadcast of Taiwanese drama Meteor Garden was a ratings success in 2003. Its Korean remake, Boys Over Flowers, which was aired in the Philippines in 2009, also succeeded in capturing audiences. Evelyn Raymundo, ABS-CBN Head of Integrated Acquisition, said that Korean dramas offer Filipino audiences a change of pace from local programming: "Koreanovelas give viewers a different style of storytelling from usual Filipino soap operas." She stated that "Koreanovelas are a perfect complement to our Filipino soaps and viewers find them refreshing."

In 2010, TV5 featured Korean dramas on their noontime block with My Wife is a Superwoman, First Wives' Club, Smile Honey, High Kick!, and Don't Cry My Love. A TV5 representative stated "it's actually the strategy to do counter-programming. When everyone else is going high-energy with noontime shows, here we are offering the best titles of Koreanovelas on noontime. It's like this will be our primetime. We want to provide an alternative."

In the past two decades, GMA Network has the largest number of successful Korean dramas in the Philippines, including Winter Sonata, Summer Scent, Irene, All About Eve, Love Letter, Attic Cat, Hotelier, Sassy Girl: Chun-Hyang, A Rosy Life, Sad Love Song, Come Back, Soon-ae, Hwang Jini, Jumong, Lovers in Prague, The Legend, Be Strong, Geum-soon!, Love Story in Harvard, East of Eden, Queen Seon Deok, Shining Inheritance, Temptation of Wife, The Baker King, Dong Yi, Secret Garden, Moon Embracing the Sun, The Princess' Man, Smile, Dong Hae, Empress Ki, Master's Sun, My Love from the Star, Reply 1997, Descendants of the Sun, Strong Girl, Bong-soon, The Romantic Doctor, Emperor: Ruler of the Mask, Sky Castle, The Penthouse, Poong, the Joseon Psychiatrist, and Queen of Masks.

ABS-CBN, for its part, has aired Lovers in Paris, Memories of Bali, Green Rose, My Girl, Princess Hours, Cinderella's Sister, My Girlfriend is a Gumiho, Pure Love, City Hunter, Dream High, Two Wives, To the Beautiful You, Rooftop Prince, Missing You, The Love Story of Kang Chi, Crazy Love, The Heirs, My Love Donna, Love in the Moonlight, Legend of the Blue Sea, Goblin, Hwarang, Hwayugi, I Have a Lover, and Hotel del Luna. Meanwhile, TV5 has also aired Hero, Glass Castle, Time Between Dog and Wolf, Flames of Desire, Pink Lipstick, You Are My Destiny, Bride of the Century, Cool Guys, Hot Ramen, Reply 1988, Wok of Love, The Beauty Inside, The Secret Life of My Secretary, Welcome to Waikiki, True Beauty, Remember: War of the Son, More Than Friends, Revolutionary Love, Diary of a Prosecutor, and Catch the Ghost.

Net 25, the official broadcaster of Iglesia ni Cristo (INC) religious programs, has aired a number of Korean dramas such as The Snow Queen, Class 7 Civil Servant, Never Twice, A Place in the Sun, Fatal Promise, Mysterious Personal Shopper, Unwanted Family, House of Bluebird, and Gracious Revenge. In 2022, River Where the Moon Rises, Again My Life and From Now On, Showtime! were the first three Korean dramas that aired on ALLTV.

=== Reactions ===
Jose Mari Abacan, GMA Head of Acquisition Department, tells that "Filipinos love Korean dramas because they can relate to the stories." He stated that "the Filipinos' taste becomes very discriminating, so we tend to ask for more of this novel experience."

Several politicians have noted the popularity of Korean dramas in the country. President Ferdinand "Bongbong" Marcos, Jr. acknowledged the importance of Korean dramas and culture to the Filipinos: "with Korean restaurants sprouting out around the Philippines, Filipinos have shared stories and have laughed over some kimchi, some samgyeopsal with friends and family, and of course, the countless hours we have spent binge-watching our favorite Korean dramas and listening to K-pop. This highlights how the Filipinos love Koreans." Filipino politician Rodante Marcoleta complimented that Korean dramas have better stories and has a lot of choices: "they may not be so good at acting, but the flow of the story, especially their society is different so it will attract your interest, you get something to learn. They are able to show their culture, we see it ourselves and we say, we should adopt that too."

== List of Korean dramas aired in the Philippines ==
The following is a list of Korean dramas originally aired first on each channel or platform. Reruns are excluded in this section.

=== GMA Network, Inc. ===
GMA (2003–present)

- Bright Girl (2003)
- Endless Love: Autumn In My Heart (2003)
- My Love, Cindy (2003)
- Beautiful Days (2003)
- Funny Wild Girl (2003)
- Endless Love II: Winter Sonata (2003)
- Loving You (2004)
- Irene (2004)
- Love Letter (2004)
- Guardian Angel (2004)
- Endless Love III: Summer Scent (2004)
- Stairway To Heaven (2005)
- Glass Shoes (2005)
- Full House (2005)
- All About Eve (2005)
- Sweet 18 (2005)
- All For Love (2005)
- Hotelier (2005)
- Sassy Girl: Chun-Hyang (2005)
- My 19 Year Old Sister-in-Law (2005)
- Romance (2005)
- Jewel in the Palace (2005)
- Date With Tiffany (2005)
- 18 VS. 29 (2005)
- First Love of a Royal Prince (2005)
- Sad Love Song (2006)
- My Name Is Kim Sam Soon (2006)
- Snow White, Sweet Love (2006)
- House Husband (2006)
- A Second Proposal (2006)
- Yellow Handkerchief (2006)
- Love Story in Harvard (2006)
- Ms. Kim's Million Dollar Quest (2006)
- A Rosy Life (2006)
- Into the Sun (2006)
- Jumong (2007)
- One Million Roses (2007)
- My Strange Family (2007)
- Love Truly (2007)
- Love in Heaven (2007)
- Foxy Lady (2007)
- Lovers in Prague (2007)
- Couple or Trouble (2007)
- Hwang Jini (2007)
- Come Back Soon-Ae (2007)
- Coffee Prince (2008)
- Dating Now (2008)
- The Legend (2008)
- Witch Yoo Hee (2008)
- Dalja's Spring (2008)
- Hello My Lady (2008)
- Sweet Spy (2008)
- My Husband's Woman (2008)
- Be Strong, Geum-soon! (2008)
- Money War (2008)
- Wanted Perfect Family (2008)
- Chil Princesses (2009)
- Cruel Love (2009)
- Shining Inheritance (2009)
- Last Romance (2009)
- On Air (2009)
- Queen Seondeok (2010)
- East of Eden (2010)
- Temptation of Wife (2010)
- The Baker King (2011)
- Secret Garden (2011)
- Playful Kiss (2011)
- Gourmet (2011)
- Big Thing (2011)
- Cinderella Man (2011)
- Dong Yi (2011)
- Iris (2012)
- Chuno: The Slave Hunter (2012)
- Lie to Me (2012)
- Lee San: The Wind Of The Palace (2012)
- Moon Embracing the Sun (2012)
- Smile, Dong Hae (2012)
- Angel's Temptation (2012)
- The Princess' Man (2012)
- The Greatest Love (2013)
- Big (2013)
- Unexpected You (2013)
- Queen And I (2013)
- I Do, I Do (2013)
- Padam Padam (2013)
- My Daughter, Seoyoung (2013)
- The Innocent Man (2013)
- A 100-Year Legacy (2013)
- Tale of Arang: A Tale Without End (2014)
- My Love from the Star (2014)
- The Master's Sun (2014)
- Return of the Wife (2014)
- Secret Love (2014)
- I Hear Your Voice (2014)
- May Queen (2014)
- Prime Minister and I (2014)
- Empress Ki (2014)
- Women in the Sun (2015)
- Future's Choice (2015)
- Two Mothers (2015)
- King of Ambition (2015)
- The Mermaid (2015)
- Birth of a Beauty (2015)
- The King's Doctor (2015)
- Pinocchio (2015)
- Reply 1997 (2015)
- Legendary Women (2015)
- Ice Adonis (2015)
- The Producers (2015)
- Temptation (2016)
- Carmina (2016)
- You're The Best! (2016)
- Hi School Love On (2016)
- Love Me, Heal Me (2016)
- Secret Hotel (2016)
- I Heart You Doc (2016)
- Mamaw-in-Law (2016)
- Oh My Venus (2016)
- Descendants of the Sun (2016)
- The Healer (2016)
- Angel's Revenge (2016)
- Oh My Ghost (2016)
- Codename: Yong Pal (2016)
- The Big One (2017)
- Pretty Woman (2017)
- Scarlet Heart (2017)
- Innocent Defendant (2017)
- All About My Mom (2017)
- Mirror of the Witch (2017)
- Saimdang: Soulmates Across Time (2017)
- Let's Fight Ghost! (2017)
- My Daughter, Geum Sa-weol (2017)
- Strong Girl Bong-soon (2017)
- My Secret Romance (2017)
- The Romantic Doctor (2017)
- The Maid (2018)
- Fight for My Way (2018)
- Bride of the Water God (2018)
- Cinderella and the Four Knights (2018)
- While You Were Sleeping (2018)
- Marriage Contract (2018)
- Woman of Dignity (2018)
- Don't Dare to Dream (2018)
- Something About 1% (2018)
- My Golden Life (2018)
- Whisper (2019)
- Cheese in the Trap (2019)
- My Sassy Girl (2019)
- Love in Trouble (2019)
- Are You Human? (2019)
- Queen of Mystery (2019)
- Emperor: Ruler of the Mask (2019)
- Mr. Sunshine (2019)
- Sky Castle (2019)
- Love Alert (2019)
- Angel's Last Mission (2020)
- The Last Empress (2020)
- Misty (2020)
- VIP (2020)
- Fates & Furies (2021)
- The Romantic Doctor 2 (2021)
- The Penthouse (2021)
- Her Private Life (2021)
- Lie After Lie (2021)
- Oh My Baby (2021)
- The Penthouse 2 (2021)
- Mr. Queen (2021)
- When the Weather Is Fine (2021)
- Tale of the Nine Tailed (2021)
- Scripting Your Destiny (2021)
- The Penthouse 3 (2022)
- Backstreet Rookie (2022)
- One the Woman (2022)
- The Witch's Diner (2022)
- Show Window: The Queen's House (2022)
- The Red Sleeve (2022)
- About Time (2022)
- Ghost Doctor (2022)
- My Shy Boss (2022)
- Another Miss Oh (2022)
- Poong, the Joseon Psychiatrist (2023)
- Her Bucket List (2023)
- Eve (2023)
- Now, We Are Breaking Up (2023)
- Revenge Note (2023)
- My Roommate is a Gumiho (2023)
- Jirisan (2023)
- Poong, the Joseon Psychiatrist 2 (2023)
- Queen of Masks (2023)
- Jinxed at First (2024)
- Secret Affair (2024)
- Yumi's Cells (2024)
- Kokdu: Season of Deity (2024)
- Queen of the Ring (2024)
- Shooting Stars (2024)
- Curtain Call (2024)
- The Heavenly Idol (2024)
- Stealer: The Treasure Keeper (2024)
- Agency (2025)
- Perfect Marriage Revenge (2025)
- Red Balloon (2025)
- Bossam: Steal the Fate (2025)
- The Lovely Runner (2025)
- One Ordinary Day (2025)
- Delightfully Deceitful (2026)

GTV (formerly GMA News TV) (2016–present)

- Heart of Asia Presents: Girl Detective (2017)
- Marrying My Daughter Twice (2019)
- The Liar and His Lover (2019)
- The Good Manager (2019)
- Into the World Again (2019)
- Hit the Top (2020)
- Man X Man (2020)
- My Absolute Boyfriend (2020)
- Extraordinary You (2020)
- Where Stars Land (2020)
- Doctor John (2022)
- Delayed Justice (2022)
- The Merciless Judge (2022)
- Hogu's Love (2022)
- Room No. 9 (2023)
- Tomorrow's Cantabile (2023)
- Kingmaker: The Change of Destiny (2023)
- In Need of Romance (2023)

Heart of Asia Channel (2020–present)

- Witch's Love (2023)

QTV/Q (2005–2010)

- All In (2005)
- Wish Upon a Star (2005)
- Super Rookie (2006)
- Sorry, I Love You (2006)
- Over the Green Fields (2006)
- Phoenix (2006)
- Emperor of the Sea (2007)
- Hello, God! (2007)
- April Kisses (2007)
- The Snow Queen (2007)
- Typhoon in That Summer (2007)
- Golden Apple (2007)
- Farewell to Sorrow (2007)
- Tree of Heaven (2007)
- Hong Kong Express (2007)
- Fashion 70s (2007)
- Summer Beach (2008)
- Single Again (2008)
- Secret Lovers (2008)
- Hearts of 19 (2009)
- Song of the Prince (2009)
- Alone in Love (2009)
- One Fine Day (2009)
- Beethoven Virus (2010)
- I Love You (2010)
- Night After Night (2010)
- Formidable Rivals (2010)
- Celebrity Sweetheart (2010)
- Land of Wind (2010)
- Worlds Within (2010)

Hallypop (2022–2024)

- Touching You (2022)
- Monkey and Dog Romance (2022)
- Bubble Up (2022)
- Banana Actually (2024)
- The Ordinary Life of Ms. O (2024)
- Deux Yeoza (2024)
- The Sensible Life of Director Shin (2024)
- Yeojeong's Journey (2024)
- 72 Seconds (2024)
- Man in the Shower (2024)
- Mr. Hashtag (2024)
- Innerview (2024)

=== ABS-CBN Corporation ===
ABS-CBN (2003–2020)

- The Truth (2004)
- Four Sisters (2004)
- Sunshine of Love (2004)
- First Love (2004)
- Lovers in Paris (2004)
- Save the Last Dance for Me (2005)
- Memories of Bali (2005)
- Stained Glass (2005)
- Oh Feel Young (2005)
- Green Rose (2005)
- Only You (2005)
- Forbidden Love (2006)
- Spring Day (2006)
- Princess Lulu (2006)
- Wedding (2006)
- Wonderful Life (2006)
- My Girl (2006)
- A Love to Kill (2006)
- Princess Hours (2006)
- Something About 1% (2007)
- Which Star Are You From (2007)
- Spring Waltz (2007)
- Marrying a Millionaire (2008)
- Lovers (2008)
- Three Dads with One Mommy (2008)
- Boys Over Flowers (2009)
- He's Beautiful (2010)
- Perfect Match (2010)
- Cinderella's Sister (2011)
- My Princess (2011)
- I Am Legend (2011)
- My Girlfriend is a Gumiho (2011)
- Marry Me, Mary! (2011)
- Pure Love (2011)
- My Fair Lady (2011)
- Three Brothers (2011)
- Helena's Promise (2011)
- Heartstrings (2012)
- City Hunter (2012)
- Dream High (2012)
- Two Wives (2012)
- Equator Man (2012)
- Secret Love: Sungkyunkwan Scandal (2012)
- A Gentleman's Dignity (2012)
- Rooftop Prince (2013)
- You're Still the One (2013)
- Ohlala Couple (2013)
- Glory Jane (2013)
- To the Beautiful You (2013)
- Missing You (2013)
- A Promise of a Thousand Days (2013)
- Love Rain (2013)
- That Winter, the Wind Blows (2013)
- The Love Story of Kang Chi (2013)
- Wish Upon a Star (2013)
- Crazy Love (2013)
- When a Man Falls in Love (2013)
- The Heirs (2014)
- Pretty Man (2014)
- Miss Ripley (2014)
- Angel Eyes (2014)
- Fated to Love You (2015)
- My Lovely Girl (2015)
- Let's Get Married (2015)
- My Love Donna (2016; cancelled)
- Love in the Moonlight (2017)
- Goblin (2017)
- Legend of the Blue Sea (2017)
- Weightlifting Fairy (2017)
- Hwarang (2017)
- Black (2018)
- The King Is in Love (2018)
- I am Not a Robot (2018)
- W (2018)
- Doctor Crush (2018)
- Go Back Couple (2018)
- Hwayugi: A Korean Odyssey (2018)
- My Time with You (2018)
- What's Wrong with Secretary Kim (2018)
- Encounter (2019)
- Gangnam Beauty (2019)
- Code Name: Terrius (2019)
- 100 Days My Prince (2019)
- I Have a Lover (2019)
- Hotel del Luna (2019)
- Touch Your Heart (2019)
- Flower Crew: Dating Agency (2020)
- The Tale of Nokdu (2020)
- Love in Sadness (2020; cancelled)

ABS-CBN Mobile (2014)

- Faith (2014)

Asianovela Channel (2018–2020)

- Bubble Gum (2018)
- High Society (2018)
- On the Way to the Airport (2018)
- Uncontrollably Fond (2018)
- Woman with a Suitcase (2018)
- Because This Is My First Life (2019)
- Cheongdam-dong Scandal (2019)
- Goodbye Mr. Black (2019)
- Mama Fairy and the Woodcutter (2019)
- Mother (2019)
- Something in the Rain (2019)
- That Man Oh Soo (2019)
- The Good Wife (2019)
- Tomorrow, With You (2019)
- Two Cops (2019)
- Live Up to Your Name (2019)

CineMo! (2016–2017)

- Blade Man (2016)
- Blood (2016)
- Orange Marmalade (2016)
- You're All Surrounded (2016)
- Doctor Stranger (2017)
- Hyde Jekyll, Me (2017)
- Sensory Couple (2017)
- Signal (2017)
- The K2 (2017)

iWantTFC (2023–2024)

- Semantic Error (2023)
- Our Dating Sim (2023)
- Love Mate (2024)

Jeepney TV (2014–2018)

- Protect the Boss (2014)
- The Thorn Birds (2015)
- Winter Sonata (2015)
- Good Doctor (2016)
- Cheongdam-dong Alice (2017)
- Cunning Single Lady (2017)
- Emergency Couple (2017)
- It's Okay, That's Love (2017)
- Twenty Again (2017)
- Heard It Through The Grapevine (2018)
- Mask (2018)
- Oh! My Lady (2018)
- Warm and Cozy (2018)

Kapamilya Channel (2020–present)

- Familiar Wife (2020)
- The World of a Married Couple (2020)
- Suits (2021)
- Meow, The Secret Boy (2021)
- Criminal Minds (2021)
- Melting Me Softly (2021)
- Come and Hug Me (2021)
- The Great Show (2023)
- Taxi Driver (2024)
- Happiness (2025)
- Love Scout (2026)
- Queen Mantis (2026)
- Love Your Enemy (2026)

Studio 23 (2009–2011)

- Fireworks (2009)
- Smile Again (2009)
- Prince Hours (2010)
- Dream (2011)

=== TV5 Network, Inc. ===
TV5 (2008–present)

- Golden Bride (2008)
- Oh Su Jung vs. Karl (2008)
- My Wife is a Superwoman (2010)
- First Wives' Club (2010)
- Smile Honey (2010)
- High Kick! (2010)
- Don't Cry My Love (2010)
- Hero (2010)
- Glass Castle (2010)
- Time Between Dog and Wolf (2010)
- What's For Dinner? (2011)
- Good Wife, Bad Wife (2011)
- Cheer Up on Love (2011)
- Flames of Desire (2011)
- White Lies (2012)
- Love You a Thousand Times (2012)
- Pink Lipstick (2012)
- Runaway (2012)
- Giant (2012)
- You Are My Destiny (2013)
- Likeable or Not (2013)
- Bride of the Century (2014)
- Cool Guys, Hot Ramen (2014)
- The Accidental Couple (2016)
- Reply 1988 (2020)
- Wok of Love (2020)
- The Beauty Inside (2021)
- The Secret Life of My Secretary (2021)
- Welcome to Waikiki (2021)
- True Beauty (2021)
- Remember: War of the Son (2022)
- More Than Friends (2023)
- Revolutionary Love (2023)
- Diary of a Prosecutor (2024)
- Catch the Ghost (2024)
- Secret Royal Inspector & Joy (2025)

=== Eagle Broadcasting Corporation (EBC) ===
Net 25 (2013–present)

- The Snow Queen (2013)
- Class 7 Civil Servant (2014)
- Flower I Am (2014)
- Never Twice (2022)
- A Place in the Sun (2022)
- Fatal Promise (2022)
- Mysterious Personal Shopper (2023)
- Unwanted Family (2023)
- House of Bluebird (2023)
- Gracious Revenge (2024)
- Kimchi Family (2025)
- Syndrome (2025)
- Love in Her Bag (2025)
- Happy Ending (2025)

=== Advanced Media Broadcasting System (AMBS) ===
ALLTV (2022–2023)

- River Where the Moon Rises (2022)
- Again My Life (2022)
- From Now On, Showtime! (2022)
- Woori the Virgin (2023)
- Why Her (2023)
- Miracle (2023)
- If You Wish Upon Me (2023)

=== Others ===
PTV 4 (People's Television Network)

- Here Comes Mr. Oh (2014)
- The Legendary Doctor (2017)

== Philippine adaptations ==
The success of Korean dramas prompted Philippine television networks to do local adaptations or remakes.

=== GMA Network ===
- Ako si Kim Samsoon (2008)
- All About Eve (2009)
- Stairway to Heaven (2009)
- Full House (2009)
- Endless Love (based on Autumn in My Heart) (2010)
- Coffee Prince (2012)
- Temptation of Wife (2012)
- My Love From the Star (2017)
- Descendants of the Sun: The Philippine Adaptation (2020)
- Start-Up PH (2022)
- Shining Inheritance (2024)

=== ABS-CBN ===
- My Girl (2008)
- Only You (2009)
- Lovers in Paris (2009)
- Green Rose (2011)
- Pure Love (based on 49 Days) (2014)
- Two Wives (2014)
- Flower of Evil (2022)
- What's Wrong with Secretary Kim (2024)
- It's Okay to Not Be Okay (2025)

=== TV5 ===
- Baker King (2015)
- My Fair Lady (2015)
- Encounter (2021)

== See also ==
- Korean Wave
