= Koreans in the Philippines =

Total population
- 33,032 (2021)

Regions with significant populations
- Luzon: Metro Manila, Baguio, Angeles City; Visayas: Metro Cebu, Negros Island Region, Metro Iloilo–Guimaras; Mindanao: Metro Davao, Cagayan de Oro

Languages
- Korean, English, Filipino and various Philippine languages

Religion
- Mainly Protestantism, Roman Catholicism, Buddhism

Related ethnic groups
- Korean diaspora

Koreans in the Philippines, largely consisting of expatriates from South Korea and people born in the Philippines with Korean ancestry, form the second largest Korean diaspora community in Southeast Asia and the 14th-largest in the world, after Koreans in Kazakhstan and after Koreans in Vietnam. As of 2013, statistics of South Korea's Ministry of Foreign Affairs and Trade recorded their population at 88,102 people, a fall of 31% since 2009 after a period of rapid growth in the population in the preceding decade.

Many South Koreans living in the Philippines are attracted to the low cost of English-language education and housing, both significantly cheaper than those offered in their native South Korea. The warmer climate is yet another motivating factor for the recent surge in migration. The Philippines is also a popular destination for retired South Koreans on fixed pensions; the Filipino government actively promotes the settlement of South Korean retirees in the country because of the potential lucrative opportunities for the local economy. There are also known cases of North Koreans having been admitted to the Philippines as migrant workers.

== Migration history ==
The history of Korean settlement in the Philippines can be divided into five phases. The first, lasting until the end of World War II, consisted of just a few disconnected individuals. Chang Pogo of Unified Silla was said to have visited the country as early as the 8th century. However, there was sparse contact or information of contact over the centuries later. There is brief mention of a Korean noblewoman, Doña Maria Park, who lived around 1572-1636 as a Catholic nun serving with other local Japanese exiled Christian (Kirishitan) nuns under the Jesuit-chaplained Beatas de Meaco (Kyoto) or Miyako no Bikuni (Nuns of Kyoto, 1615–1656) in Manila. Moon Sun-Deuk, a native of Ui Island who survived a shipwreck in the Philippines, was a ray merchant who sailed and drifted to Japan's Okinawa Island with his uncle and four other colleagues, then ended up seeing northern Philippines and lived there for 9 months. Moon had a flair with foreign languages as he acquired the language in Yeosong (Luzon) - possibly Ilocano language, and had a sharp eye for the way the people lived. Considered as Korea's first person to learn a Philippine language, he was able to use his interpretation skills conversing with the five Filipinos who were shipwrecked off Jeju Island in 1801 and were able to return home after nine years. He was the first recorded Filipino interpreter in Joseon dynasty. In 1837, Andrew Kim Taegon and two other Korean Catholics took refuge in the Philippines after fleeing a riot in Macau, where they had been studying. They lived in a monastery near Lolomboy, Bocaue, Bulacan. Around 1935, a few itinerant ginseng peddlers from Uiju, North Pyongan (in present-day North Korea) arrived in the country via Vietnam. Some Korean soldiers came with the Imperial Japanese Army when it occupied the Philippines during World War II; three of these, from Uiju, are known to have married local women and to have chosen remain in the country permanently. One of them, Pak Yun-hwa, went on to establish the Korean Association Philippines Inc. in 1969, which would grow to become the country's largest Korean organization.

The second phase of Korean settlement in the Philippines consisted of the war brides of Filipino soldiers who fought on the side of the UN Forces in the Korean War. About 30 moved to the Philippines with their husbands in the 1960s; in 1975, they formed the Mothers' Association.

Beginning with the third phase, migration began to take on a more economic character. With the growth of the South Korean economy, companies in labour-intensive manufacturing industries responded to increasing wages by relocating their operations to other countries, including the Philippines, beginning in the 1980s. As a result, managers of enterprises both big and small, along with their families, began to increase. The fourth phase, in the 1990s. saw an expansion in the variety of Korean businesses in the Philippines; South Korean businesspeople not from just manufacturing companies, but import-export businesses, restaurants, and construction companies, all founded ethnic-specific business associations in this era.

The fifth phase of migration history, beginning in the late 1990s and 2000s, saw the number of students increase. The influx of students coincided with a more relaxed visa policy of the Bureau of Immigration (BI) aimed at attracting foreign students. It was also marked by growing influence and engagement by the various Korean associations with mainstream Philippine society. For example, the Merchant Association, formed in July 2001 and renamed as the Financial Expert Union Association in 2002, helped to regularise the status of South Korean entrepreneurs who had been working without a proper visa, while the South Korean Used Automobile Import Association fought against a newly introduced prohibition on the importation of used cars, and the Travel Company Association worked with the Philippine Department of Tourism to resolve visa and licensing issues for South Korean tour guides who hoped to work in the Philippines.

This case of migration can be seen in a unique standpoint. Rather than arriving for purposes such as political safety or financial stability, they are rather coming to the Philippines for vacation, leisurely activities, business ventures, or for schooling. In the past, when we look at global migration patterns, people typically leave their countries for safety or financial purposes. This is one of the rare cases in history where a migration pattern so large is coming from a place of stability.

=== North Koreans ===
In the early 2000s, the Philippines also began to become a transit point for North Korean refugees leaving China en route to South Korea, similar to the manner in which the country turned into way-station for Vietnamese boat people in earlier decades. The Philippines is one of just three Southeast Asian signatories to the 1951 United Nations Convention Relating to the Status of Refugees (the other two being Cambodia and East Timor). Hwang Jang-yop passed through the Philippines after he defected in 1997. In 2001, seven members of a North Korean family transited through Manila. A group of 25 North Korean refugees used the Philippines as a transit point in 2002. According to a U.S. diplomatic cable leaked by WikiLeaks, the number would grow to more than 500 annually by 2005; the Philippine government continued to cooperate quietly with the South Korean government to permit transit of refugees, but reacted coolly to suggestions of admitting North Korean refugees for settlement. Bureau of Immigration records do not show any North Koreans residing legally in the country; however, unnamed BI sources quoted by the media claimed that some North Korean defectors had blended into the much larger South Korean community in the country and settled down there.

== Geographical distribution ==
=== Luzon ===
==== Metro Manila ====
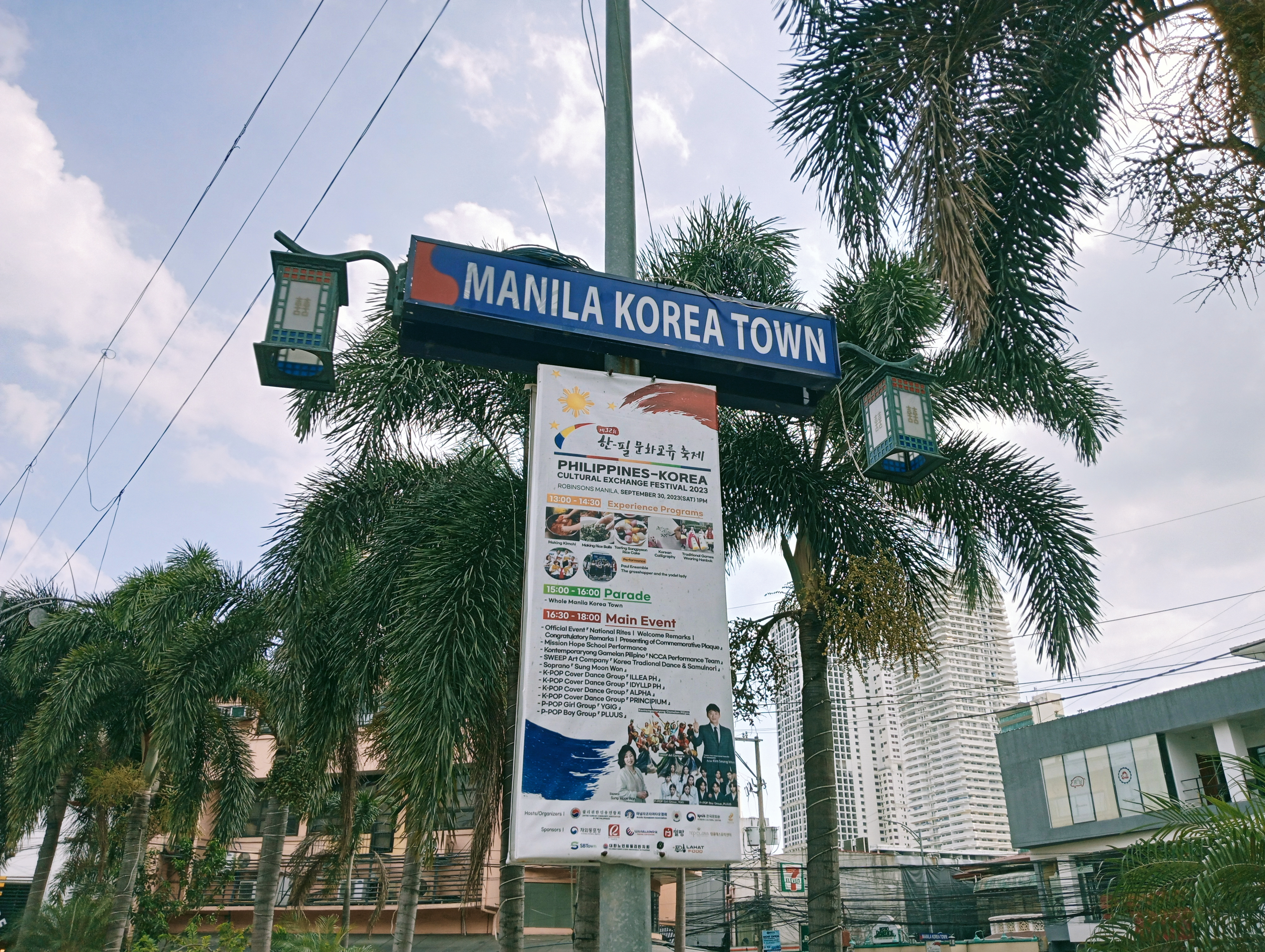
Manila Korea Town in Malate, Manila

According to MOFAT statistics, the Metro Manila area has the largest Korean population in the Philippines, with 33,267 people. The areas of highest concentration are Quezon City (6,655 people), Manila proper (6,104 people) and Makati (5,643 people). As early as 2002, BF Homes in Parañaque had been noted for its high concentration of Koreans, with local residents saying that every fifth or sixth door had a Korean business behind it such as a restaurant, travel agency, taekwondo gym, or used appliance seller. The most well-known Koreatown in the Metro Manila area is located in Makati's Barangay Poblacion. Most of the Korean businesses can be found in the area bounded north–south by JP Rizal Avenue and Jupiter, and east–west by Makati Avenue and Rockwell Drive, with P. Burgos running roughly through the middle of the area. In Quezon City, the Kalayaan Plaza Building has various Korean businesses, apartments, and a church (one of seven or eight Korean churches in QC that existed in 2005). Increasingly, students are billeted in rented houses in expensive gated communities such as Barangay Ayala Alabang, Muntinlupa City.

A Korea Town was also established in the district of Malate in Manila.

==== Baguio ====
MOFAT statistics showed 4,212 Koreans in Baguio as of 2013. Koreans come to Baguio due to its reputation as the northern Philippines' education capital with good local standard of spoken English, and also its cool climate due to high elevation. The weather and low cost of living is a particular attraction to Korean retirees; the latter factor is disappearing recently but the former remains. In the late 1990s, there was only one Korean restaurant in the city, along with a Korean-owned beauty parlor. The population expansion was led by Korean students who came for English courses during their school breaks. Some enrolled as regular students in local universities. Others brought their families. However, in 2008, it was reported that thousands of Koreans had left Baguio since their businesses went bankrupt in the face of the global economic crisis' effects on the Philippines, dropping the local Korean population from 10,000 to 4,000. A plan for Korean investors to redevelop the Baguio Athletic Bowl in Burnham Park fell apart in early 2010 due to the city government's opposition to the facility's privatization.

The number of language schools aimed at Koreans has expanded rapidly. By 2006, the city officially already had twelve tutorial schools aimed at Koreans. In addition to the tutorial schools, roughly two to four thousand Korean schoolchildren enrolled in local grade schools by 2007. Baguio is also a popular destination not just for youths, but also for Korean nurses who aim to improve their English skills before working in the United States or United Kingdom. However, in 2007, it was estimated that, out of 55 Korean-run language schools in Baguio, 18 lacked the proper permits from the Technical Education and Skills Development Authority (TESDA). Problems with school accreditation continued, and by 2011, Koreans in the city agreed to a moratorium on the opening of further English schools, to allow the by-then 115 schools to be audited.

Aside from students, Korean Christians from Busan and Incheon have come to plant churches. South Korean fashion and entertainment have also become trendy in Baguio, affording entrepreneurial Koreans the chance to do good business as importers of cultural products. Koreans participate in local events such as the Panagbenga Festival (Baguio Flower Festival). However, their integration is not entirely without problems: in particular despite estimates that the city had the country's second-largest Korean population following Manila, the municipal records showed only ten Koreans who had permits to operate businesses in the city. It was widely known that many were actually working illegally. Residents complained of illegal businesses which violated foreign ownership limits and underpaid wages, and of loud parties held by Koreans in their apartments. Furthermore, they gained a reputation of being tax-dodgers and corrupt as the Korean businesses contributed little tax revenue to city coffers.

==== Angeles ====
Angeles City is home of the biggest korea town in the Philippines located at Brgy. Anunas in Angeles

According to MOFAT statistics, there are 30,394 Koreans living in other parts of Luzon, primarily Angeles City, (24,652 people) and Cavite (5,000 people). Koreans also have a presence near the economic freezones like Clark and Subic. Between Porac and Angeles City (where Clark is located) numerous residential subdivisions have come to be dominated by Korean nationals. In 2011, Koreans in Angeles held a Kor-Phil Cultural Exchange Hanmadang Festival at Bayanihan Park. The Hanjin Group has a US$1 billion shipbuilding project at Subic, estimated to comprise almost a third of total South Korean FDI in the Philippines in 2007 and was then the world's fourth largest shipyard. Hanjin was lauded by the government for their generation of employment. In 2012 and 2013 they are expected to add another 5,000 jobs to their workforce. However, their investments have provoked environmental controversy, especially with their building of a US$20 million condominium complex for their managers in the Subic Watershed Forest Reserve, the home of the Aeta peoples. Korean investors are also building a $20 million industrial and tourism complex in Pangasinan comprising a fish farm, solar and wind power generation facilities, seaplane berths, and a monorail.

There is also minor Korean activity on the northern Luzon coast. As early as 2005, a group of South Korean investors began setting up a golf academy at Suba, Paoay, Ilocos Norte. In 2007, the Real Enterprise Group, a South Korean hotel and casino operator, were reportedly interested in investing in tourism facilities in the province, especially beach resorts at Pagudpud and Paoay. The Korean investors are interested in support facilities such as spas, night clubs, and golf courses. The Laoag government also aimed to get direct flights between Korea and Laoag, so that tourists would not have to waste time flying south to Manila and then catch a connecting flight back north. There had been plans for the Korea Overseas Grain Investment and Development Company (Kogid) to invest $12 million in a 10,000-hectare (39 sq mi) maize plantation in Mallig, Isabela, but the plans were put on hold over a dispute on value added tax exemption. On Angeles, Pampanga. Anunas is the barangay that houses the city's Koreatown, a chain of Korean establishments along the Fil-Am Friendship Highway. Anunas is also identified as one of the growth centers of the city, focusing on light industries such as woodcarving and rattan craft.

There are also known to be some North Korean migrant workers who have been admitted to the Philippines as laborers in the area. A public controversy around this erupted in January 2010, when a North Korean ship carrying 2,800 metric tons of magnetite ran aground near Claveria, Cagayan on New Year's Day. There were claims that the magnetite had been illegally mined in violation of a provincial ban, but others claimed that the quantity in question was just a "sample" and came from a pre-existing stockpile. Some reports claimed that the ship also carried marijuana and shabu, but an immigration officer was quoted as stating the materials in question were just butter and tea.

=== Visayas ===
==== Cebu ====
Cebu is a popular tourist draw for Koreans, and some settled down to make the province their home. In Cebu City, as early as 2005 Korean investors were renting old buildings in the city center, helping to revive the area in the same way that they revived Avenida or Escolta districts in Manila. Even high bureaucratic fees (such as a P50,000 levy on foreigners running short-term language schools) did little to slow the influx. By 2007 there were estimated to be 13,000 Korean residents and 200 Korean-owned businesses in various cities across Cebu. Koreans make up the vast majority of foreign students in Cebu; they are far and away the largest group of special study permit holders there, holding 4,473 of the outstanding 5,065 permits in mid 2010, nearly twenty times the second largest group, Japanese. The population continued to grow, to 32,000 by 2013, according to MOFAT statistics, even while Korean populations in other areas of the Philippines were shrinking.

The 200,000 tourist arrivals from South Korea to Cebu as of 2009 prompted a Korean development company to plan a P4.5 billion resort investment to get in on the action. In 2011 Koreans were also reported to be interested in building a 400 MW coal power plant at Naga. Local residents have also seen business benefit from the Korean influx, for example in the organic farming sector due to the demand for organic produce by local Korean groceries as well as in the hospitality sector. In 2011 it was announced that the Cebu City government planned to declare a Korean Day in October each year to celebrate contributions of Korean immigrants and tourists to the cities, and promote cultural exchange between Filipinos and Koreans.

==== Negros Island Region ====
Bacolod is the main draw for Koreans in Negros Island Region, where they formed the largest group among the 21,741 tourist arrivals in the city between 2008 and 2009. However, 2013 MOFAT statistics showed only 700 actually living there. The city is a sister city of Andong and Daegu's Seo District, and holds a Phil-Korea Day festival each year with a beauty pageant among the city's residents. It is a joint program of the city tourism office and the Bacolod Korean Association. The city mayor Evelio "Bing" R. Leonardia hopes that the Korean community in Bacolod can contribute to the further development of Korean tourism in the city and plans to provide them with marketing incentives to that end. Local Koreans have suggested providing Korean-language signs at Bacolod-Silay International Airport, hoping that the city government could look into direct flights between the airport and South Korea's major international airports. However Korean students in the city are concerned over the "public safety" situation there due to what newspapers described as "rampant crimes" against them, and the Bacolod Language Center Association has requested increased police presence around the schools, especially at La Salle Avenue and Gallardo Street. A Korean company is also reported to be investing in a 40 megawatt solar power plant on a 71-hectare (180-acre) site at Barangay Santo Niño of E. B. Magalona, which will operate for 12 hours a day and charge a P12/kilowatt hour tariff after accounting for the feed-in tariff incentive.

Smaller numbers of Koreans are also found in Negros Oriental. Dumaguete has a small Korean community, according to 2004 statistics having about 50 students at Silliman University and other schools in the city, five Korean-run churches, and two Korean-run religious schools. Korean-owned Bio Green Manufacture and Processing have also invested in a cassava and jatropha oil plantations in the Tamlang Valley, aimed at the production of biofuels. However, they have faced opposition from local residents due to the potential impact on food security, and have even had their tractors burned by the Negrense squad of the New People's Army at the towns of Santa Catalina and Siaton.

==== Iloilo ====
The Korean population in Iloilo City has also been growing. There were 1,500 Koreans living there in 2013, according to MOFAT statistics. Koreans are attracted to the relative peace and order in the city, according to then-mayor Jerry Treñas. There were estimated to be about 2,000 Koreans settled in the city, and 10,000 visitors from South Korea. In 2008, TESDA forced the closure of twelve ESL schools aimed at Korean students. Korean investors were reportedly interested in a waste-to-energy project, which could almost four megawatts from the 170 tons of garbage the city generated each day. The Seoul-based Full Gospel Nowon Church sent a medical mission to Iloilo City in September 2010. In 2011 Koreans settled in Iloilo City began to press for direct flights between there and Incheon in 2011. Moon Dae Jin, president of the Iloilo Korean Association, stated that most South Koreans residing in the city are students enrolled in various universities, while others were engaged in business.

In August 2022, K-Town opened at Festive Walk Parade in Iloilo Business Park. It features a lineup of Korean stores and restaurants, including those specializing in samgyeopsal. Since then, it has become the primary venue for most Korean-related activities in the city. K-Town is also home to a commemorative historical marker celebrating the friendship between the Ilonggo and Korean people.

==== Elsewhere in Visayas ====
The Korean firm KI Bio 2007 has invested $5 million in the jatropha business in Northern Samar province. The Philippine National Police have urged the Koreans there to set up community organization in order to liaise with them on security issues.

=== Mindanao ===
==== Davao ====
There were 3,734 Koreans living in the Davao Region in 2013, according to MOFAT statistics. The Korean presence there began expanding in the mid-2000s. In 2001, Koreans were only the 10th-most common foreigners in Southern Mindanao, but by 2006 they had grown to third place. In 2007 South Korean investments in Davao were reported to be expanding. Some of the then-800 Korean residents of Davao City formed a chamber of commerce that year. Korean restaurants were sprouting up to serve the Korean students studying abroad there, and Korean property developers aimed to construct hundreds of millions of pesos of projects including golf courses, English language schools for foreigners, and export-oriented industrial parks to entice Japanese and South Korean firms to set up shop. Businesspeople feel the city's potential is relatively "untapped" compared to other markets in the Philippines such as Cebu or Baguio. About 2,647 Korean tourists visited Davao in 2006, up slightly from 2,622 in 2005.

There are a number of Korean investment projects in the region. As early as 2002, two consortiums of Korean and Japanese investors were in the process of setting up used-car refurbishment plants in Davao City. SK Chemicals, part of the SK Group, looked into the possibility of setting up a coconut-processing plant there in 2004, which would process one billion coconuts per year. Korean and Japanese investors have set up retirement communities in Davao City for their respective nationals, and in 2008 looked into expanding their sites. The Korea International Cooperation Agency is also working with the local government of Davao del Sur on a P193.36 rice-processing plant designed to cut postharvest losses from 25% to 5%. A Korean investment group which has already opened one vegetable farm in Luzon is also reportedly interested in building another farm near Davao City.

However, there were also some cultural conflicts in the integration of Koreans there, with the Davao City mayor especially complaining about their habit of smoking in public places. Furthermore, some Davao City councilors have received reports of Koreans illegally doing business, behaving arrogantly, and underpaying employees.

==== Cagayan de Oro ====
In Northern Mindanao, Koreans have come to Cagayan de Oro as ESL students, businesspeople, and missionaries. 2013 MOFAT statistics showed 1,000 living there. Korean investment group I. F. Koresco opened a 74-room hotel there in 2006, the Hotel Koresco, and the city government asked for their assistance in negotiating with South Korea's POSCO about the possibility of opening a steel plant there as well. In 2008 announced plans to build a casino and hotel complex there, though there was local opposition from community leaders in religious and civic groups over the casino aspect, and in fact the city council had an ordinance prohibiting casino operation. Korean and Turkish investors are also reported to be interested in a power plant project in nearby Iligan. Misamis Oriental is also making efforts to lure Korean investors to invest in agricultural processing enterprises in the Phidivec Industrial Estate, a special zone under the Philippine Economic Zone Authority.

== Education ==
=== Universities ===
2011 statistics of the Philippine Bureau of Immigration showed that more than 6,000 Koreans held 9(f) visas enabling them to enroll in tertiary education, roughly twice as many as the next two most frequent nationalities (Chinese and Iranians). The cost of university tuition in the Philippines is roughly one-fourth that in South Korea. According to 2007 statistics, the Philippines had 6.6% of all Korean students enrolled in universities abroad. The trend of South Korean students going to the Philippines to pursue university education began in the 1960s, when South Korea was still a poor country and the Philippines ranked as the region's second-most developed behind Japan. Philippine universities still have a reputation among older South Koreans for offering quality education, which is believed to have contributed to the boom in the numbers of South Korean international students coming to the country to learn English or even to enroll in degree courses. Since the 2001–02 academic year, South Korean international students have also been the largest group of foreigners studying at Philippine tertiary institutions, edging out Americans; in the 2002–03 academic year, they totalled 1,069 individuals, or 24.6% of the total 4,363 foreign students in the country, while in the following year, they numbered 726, or 34.6% of the total 2,161 foreign students. They are attracted to such universities by the opportunity to use English in a real-live setting rather than as a classroom exercise; however, they face several difficulties in this regard, including the use of Taglish, and more generally the prevalence of code switching between English and Tagalog by both lecturers and peers. They also find it difficult to adapt to the student-centered teaching style of Philippine universities, which demands active class participation.

=== English and Spanish as second languages ===
Compared to other countries in East and Southeast Asia, the Philippines boasts high English proficiency. This is due to their history of American occupation from 1898-1946. When the Americans initially arrived, the natives living on the island were mostly illiterate and lacked a unifying language. Though the Spanish had colonized them for over 300 years, little to no effort was made to enforce Spanish as a nationwide written and spoken language. The Spaniards were mostly uninterested in administering or providing public education. Because of this, the Americans felt the need to educate and take the Philippines under their wing. One of their main goals was to provide public and private education. Through this, English became a dominant language and the tongue of education.

The majority of Korean students in the Philippines study in short-term courses in English language schools to cope with South Korea's growing demand for English proficiency. As of March 2011, 26,823 Korean students held special study permits to enroll in short term courses. South Korea's economic growth is reflected in this trend. For example, middle class families are now beginning to send their children to the Philippines to learn English. In the past, Korean middle class families were unable to pay for ravel and boarding expenses, so studying abroad was off the table. However, because of how South Korea's economy is strengthening, it is becoming more feasible to send their children abroad. Their numbers include a large proportion of young people; according to Son Jung-Son of the Philippine-Korean Cultural Center in Seoul, over 1,500 Koreans under 20 years old arrive in the Philippines every month to study English. From November 2008 to April 2010, 128 Koreans took advantage of the Special Visa for Employment Generation, which grants indefinite stay to foreigners and their dependents who create 10 full-time jobs for Filipino workers. Most of them have qualified by starting ESL schools in Metro Manila, Baguio, Cebu City, and Davao City. However Koreans have a more negative view of the Philippine English accent, as compared to their more positive attitudes towards American English. This point was brought to wide public attention when a video of actress Lee Da-hae mocked the Filipino accent on a KBS television show "went viral" among internet users in the Philippines. Lee, who herself had previously taken classes with a Filipino English teacher, quickly apologized and denied that any insult was intended. Some Koreans are also attracted to the chance to learn Spanish, taking advantage of the country's historic ties to Spain; seven thousand South Korean students are reported to study at the Instituto Cervantes in Manila.

Illegal ESL tutorial schools have been a persistent problem, and eventually provoked government crackdown. In early January 2011, Bureau of Immigration (BI) officers raided the Korean-owned Fantasy World resort in Lemery, Batangas on reports from anti-gambling advocate and competing school operator Sandra Cam that an ESL school was operating illegally there, and arrested six operators. Newspaper reports claimed that the BI was quite reluctant to carry out the raid and were only forced into it by Cam's threat to publicly denounce the BI, since protection money had been paid to some immigration officers. The seventy students of the school were found to have no special study permits (SSPs) allowing them to enroll in schools in the Philippines, and the owners of the school were found to have no business permits. The BI ordered that everyone involved be deported. The case attracted a number of negative reports in the South Korean media as well, complaining that the Philippines were "ungrateful" and "racist". In the coming weeks a total of 154 Korean minors would be detained in relation to raids on schools. However, the Department of Foreign Affairs emphasized that it saw the students as victims of deception by the managers, not criminals. They would not be charged with a crime. As the scandal progressed, applications for special study permits to the BI jumped. In just the first three weeks of January the BI received 1,480 applications and fees amounting to P7.02 million. Both in number and in money these figures exceeded the totals for the entire previous three months. A BI spokesman stated that this showed the crackdown was a success.

=== Korean schools ===
South Koreans living in the Philippines have a Korean-medium day school for their community's children, the Korean International School Philippines at McKinley Hill in the Bonifacio Global City in Taguig, Metro Manila; it was opened in January 2009 in a cooperative venture between South Korea's Ministry of Education and several South Korean nationals living in the Philippines, who jointly invested more than US$1 million. Korean children are also served by seven weekend Korean-language schools recognised by the South Korean government, the earliest being the ones in Cebu and Antipolo, both founded in 1994. Between 1997 and 2000, five more schools were founded in Davao City, Angeles City, Pasay, Baguio, and Cainta. In total, the seven schools enroll 383 students.

== Religion ==
Korean Christian churches in Metro Manila and other large cities in the Philippines serve as centers of religious and social activity within the Korean community. There is a Korean Buddhist Temple called "Korean Temple Silang" in Cavite, Philippines. The earliest Korean church, Manila's Korean Union Church, opened its doors in 1974. The churches are largely Protestant, especially Presbyterian; However, some Korean Catholic churches also exist, such as the St. Andrew Kim Dae Gun Parish Church, which grew out of a 1986 commemorative ceremony for the 150th anniversary of the martyrdom of the eponymous saint; as of 2003, the church had roughly 500 members. Young South Korean pastors are attracted to the Philippines because of the difficulty they find in starting their own church in their home country; they thus start mission-focused churches in the Philippines.

Filipinos are often baffled by and even suspicious of the presence of Korean ethnic-specific churches in their country, assuming that they have come in an attempt to evangelise Catholics; however, though the churches sometimes conduct charity outreach work in the local communities, their activities are mainly targeted towards Koreans. The few native members the churches attract tend to be those from lower socioeconomic brackets. Mass weddings conducted by the Unification Church in the 1980s caused particular controversy and had a negative effect on Philippine-South Korean diplomatic relations. The churches are often quite separated from those of the local culture, but highly dependent on the sending churches in South Korea. Relatively wealthy evangelists who continue to maintain a South Korean standard of consumption while living in the Philippines may also inadvertently evoke negative feelings from Filipinos, who expect a Christian pastor to be poor and sacrificing.

== Influence on Philippine society ==
Korean expatriates provide a significant stimulus to the local economy; they are estimated to spend between US$800 and $1000 per month, making an aggregate contribution of over $1 billion per year in consumer spending. The Korean community in the Philippines had little influence on Philippine society until the late 1980s, when the Korean Wave (한류) (the increasing popularity of South Korean television and pop music) started. Koreans' sense of fashion has also begun to influence Filipinos. However, they continue to be seen as a closed group by Filipinos. Stereotypes abound on both sides: Koreans are the target of snide remarks by Filipinos for their poor English, and Filipino workers complain of Korean managers' pushiness and short tempers, while Koreans complain of Filipinos' lack of punctuality, as well as corruption and abuse in government agencies. Furthermore, Filipinos in general perceive South Korean migration to their country as something of an oddity, as it goes against the pattern more familiar to their own experience, that of people from poorer countries migrating to more developed ones. However, the popularity of Korean television shows has served to create something of a new understanding of Koreans for Filipinos.

The increasing prevalence of South Korean men in sex tourism to the Philippines has resulted in the birth of an estimated 10,000 children of mixed Korean and Filipino descent to unwed Filipina mothers. According to the Cebu-based Kopino Foundation, a charitable organisation started by a local Korean businessman, the largest concentration can be found in Quezon City in Metro Manila. 85 to 90% of the mothers work as bar girls or in brothels with foreign clients. As their fathers are not married to their mothers, they are unable to obtain South Korean citizenship, similar to the situation of the 50,000 Amerasians (children of Filipina women and American soldiers) as well the numerous children of Japanese sex tourists. Colloquially referred to as Kopinos, or Korinoy in Filipino slang, as recently as 2003 they were believed to number fewer than 1,000; another 9,000 were born from 2003 to 2008. As a result, Filipinos' perception of Korean men has become negative. In response, South Korean NGOs such as the Daejeon Migrant Workers Support Center, as well as locally established NGOs like the Kopino Children Center, have begun to establish branch offices in the Philippines to provide social services to the children and their mothers.

In the first half of 2010, South Koreans accounted for 25% of all foreign visitors to the Philippines, ahead of the second-place Americans at 19%. As recently as 1992, the annual number of South Korean visitors arriving in the Philippines was a mere 26,000; however, that expanded over seven times to roughly 180,000 by 1997, and then to 303,867 by 2003. Tourism arrivals continued to grow rapidly, to 570,000 in 2006, meaning that South Korean tourists formed a larger group than American tourists for the first time, and then to 650,000 by 2008. Since 2006, the number of South Koreans as foreign tourists in the Philippines outranked visitors from countries such as the USA, Japan, China, Australia, and others. By 2011, their numbers had risen to over 925,000, and there were expectations that the figure would break one million for the first time in 2012. The rise in the number of tourists was reflected in the increasing number of flights between the two countries. In 2007, Korean Air, Asiana Airlines, and Philippine Airlines each offered one daily flight between Manila and Seoul. By 2012, there were an average of twenty-three daily flights between various destinations in the two countries.

Because of this, there has been a sharp increase in Korean businesses. For example, KTV Bars, grocery stores, barbershops, internet cafes, and tourist companies. These establishments were created in response to an influx of Korean migrants and visitors. Not only does this help foster community amongst Korean migrants, it also helps to provide a place of comfort and familiarity for tourists, students, businessmen, and visitors.

This has had negative impacts on Philippine society, however. Many Filipinos have expressed anger due to an unprecedented increase in rent. Not only that, but because of an increase in Korean owned businesses, several local businesses were driven out. This has caused some animosity on the Filipino side.

== Notable people ==
- Sandara Park, former movie and television actress, now residing in South Korea and former member of girl group 2NE1.
- Ryan Bang, comedian, TV host and contestant from Pinoy Big Brother: Teen Clash 2010.
- Hong Sung-chon, vice-president of the Philippine Taekwondo Association; see Taekwondo in the Philippines.
- Shine Kuk, actress and TV host.
- Dasuri Choi, dancer and TV host of Tahanang Pinakamasaya.
- Jinho Bae, singer, vlogger and TV host.
- Yohan Hwang, Korean singer based in the Philippines and winner of I Love OPM.
- Sunny Kim, former MYX VJ.
- Jang Jae-jung, former president of the Korean Association of the Philippines
- Chunsa Jung, Filipino-Korean former child actress and commercial model, former cast member of Goin' Bulilit.
- Sam Oh, TV host, radio jock and lifestyle columnist.
- Park Sang-hyun, member of Korean boy band MBLAQ and is known by his stage name of "Thunder" or "Cheondung". He is Sandara Park's younger brother.
- Grace Lee, TV host and radio jock.
- Jin Hyeon-ju (Belle), Korean singer and member of Korean girl group cignature and UNIS, also former member of Good Day as Lucky.
- Yoon Dong-yeon, Korean singer and member of Korean male group POW.
- Jung Joon-young, Korean rock singer, songwriter, model and radio jock. Stayed in the Philippines for a couple of years to do missionary work, teaching Taekwondo and music to the local children.
- Son Dong-woon, member of Korean male idol group Highlight (formerly known as BEAST), studied at Santa Rosa, Laguna.
- Yook Sungjae, member of Korean male idol group BtoB, studied at Cebu City.
- Jinri Park, model, DJ and entertainment columnist.
- Lee Dong-ho, a mariner in Davao del Norte and late husband of Jasmine B. Lee, a Filipino television personality, actress and civil servant currently based in South Korea.
- Jee Ick-Joo, businessman who was abducted in Angeles, Pampanga and allegedly killed inside Camp Crame when Gen. Ronald dela Rosa was in Beijing in October 2016.
- Kim Jinhwan (Jay), Korean singer and member of Korean male idol group iKON, used to live in Davao City.
- Park Yi-young, Korean former student turned football player, started his football career in UFL then transferred to Germany.
- Kino, Korean singer and member of Korean male idol group Pentagon, used to live in the Philippines for three months.
- Alexander Lee, actor and former member of boy band U-KISS.
- Angeli Khang, actress, known for her performances in VMX
- Cha Eun-woo, Korean singer, actor and member of boy group Astro, used to study in the Philippines during his elementary days.
- Hwang In-yeop, Korean actor and model. Aside from spending his high school, he actually pursued his tertiary studies in Philippine Women's College, Davao – Helena Z Benitez School of Fine Arts and Design. He is an alumnus from batch 2012.
- Ji Soo, Korean actor, residing in the Philippines and portrayed different roles in Black Rider (TV series) and Abot Kamay Na Pangarap.

== See also ==
- Korean Wave
- Korean drama (a.k.a. Koreanovela)
- K-pop
- South Korean television dramas in the Philippines
- Filipinos in South Korea
