= Park Shin-hye filmography =

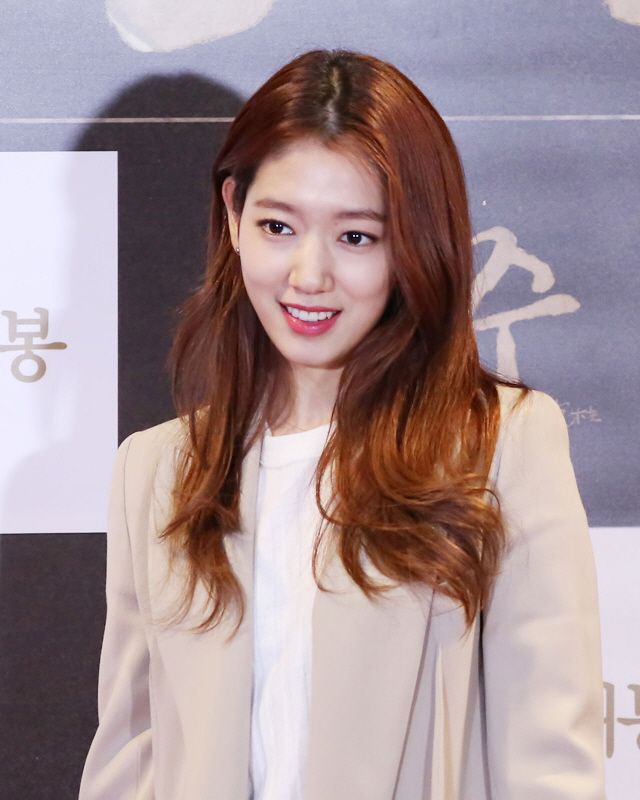
- Park in 2016
- Film: 13
- Television series: 33
- Television show: 2
- Documentary: 5
- Hosting: 7

Park Shin-hye (born February 18, 1990) is a South Korean actress and singer.

== Film ==
Year	Title	Role	Notes	Ref.
2006	Love Phobia	Byeon-ja		
2007	Evil Twin	So-yeon / Hyo-jin		
2010	Cyrano Agency	Min-yeong		
2010	Green Days: Dinosaur and I	Oh Yi-rang (voice)		
2012	Waiting for Jang Joon-hwan	Shin-hye	Short film	
2013	Miracle in Cell No. 7	Ye-seung (adult)		
2013	One Perfect Day	Eun-hee	Short film	
2014	The Royal Tailor	Queen		
2015	The Beauty Inside	Woo-jin		
2016	My Annoying Brother	Lee Soo-hyun		
2017	Heart Blackened	Choi Hee-jung		
2020	#Alive	Kim Yoo-bin		
2020	The Call	Kim Seo-yeon	Netflix film	

== Television series ==
Year	Title	Role	Notes	Ref.
2003	Stairway to Heaven	Han Jung-suh (young)		
2004	Nonstop 4	Shin-hye	Cameo (episode 73)	
2004	If Wait for the Next Train Again	Ran-ui (young)	Drama City	
2004	Not Alone	Ahn Shin-hye		
2004	Very Merry Christmas	Si-eun	Drama Special	
2005	The New Dad is Twenty-Nine	Song Dae-in	Drama Special	
2005	Cute or Crazy	Park Shin-hye		
2005	One Fine Day	Hee-kyung	Drama Special	
2005	Daddy Long Legs	Seo-kyung	Drama Special	
2006	Seoul 1945	Choi Geum-hee	Cameo (episodes 2–4)	
2006	Tree of Heaven	Hana		
2006	Rainbow Romance	Shin-hye	Cameo, episode 117	
2007	Prince Hours	Shin Sae-ryung		
2007	Several Questions That Make Us Happy	Hyun-ji	Segment: Family	
2007	Kimcheed Radish Cubes	Jang Sa-ya		
2008	Bicheonmu	A Li Shui (Arisu)		
2009	You're Beautiful	Go Mi-nam / Go Mi-nyeo		
2010	My Girlfriend Is a Gumiho	Go Mi-nyeo	Cameo (episode 6)	
2010	High Kick Through the Roof	future Hae-ri	Cameo (episode 119)	
2011	Heartstrings	Lee Gyu-won		
2011	Hayate the Combat Butler	Xiao Zhi / Sanqianyuan Zhi	Taiwanese drama	
2012	Don't Worry, I'm a Ghost	Yeon-hwa	Drama Special	
2012	The King of Dramas	Lead Actress of Graceful Revenge	Cameo (episode 1)	
2013	Flower Boys Next Door	Go Dok-mi		
2013	Fabulous Boys	Go Mi-nyeo	Cameo (episode 1)	
2013	The Heirs	Cha Eun-sang		
2014–2015	Pinocchio	Choi In-ha		
2016	Entertainer	Assistant Manager Park	Cameo (episode 3)	
2016	Gogh, The Starry Night	Convenience store cashier	Cameo (episode 8)	
2016	The Doctors	Dr. Yoo Hye-jung		
2017	Temperature of Love	Yoo Hye-jung	Cameo (episode 21)	
2018–2019	Memories of the Alhambra	Jung Hee-joo / Emma		
2021	Sisyphus: The Myth	Kang Seo-hae		
2024	Doctor Slump	Nam Ha-neul		
2024	The Judge from Hell	Kang Bit-na		
2026	Undercover Miss Hong	Hong Geum-bo		

== Television show ==
Year	Title	Role	Notes	Ref.
2012	Music and Lyrics	Cast member	with Yoo Gun	
2018	Little Cabin in the Woods	Cast member	with So Ji-sub	

== Documentary ==
Year	Title	Notes	Ref.
2009	It City Park Shin Hye in New Caledonia: Take It Paradise		
2011	STOP HUNGER	Charity in Ghana	
2012	It City Park Shin Hye Healing Trip to Hong Kong		
2013	Photo Camping Log	with Park Se-young	
2020	Humanimal		

== Hosting ==
Year	Title	Notes	Ref.
2007–2008	Fantastic Partner		
2009	Melon Music Awards	with Jang Keun-suk	
2009	SBS Gayo Daejeon	with Jung Yong-hwa & Kim Heechul	
2011	Hallyu Dream Concert	with Ok Taecyeon & Choi Minho	
2011	Melon Music Awards	with Leeteuk & Yoon Doo-joon	
2012	Kpop Collection Okinawa	with Lee Seung-gi	
2014	2014 SBS Drama Awards	with Lee Hwi-jae and Park Seo-joon	

== Music video appearances ==
Year	Song title	Artist	Notes	Ref.
2001	"...Do You Love Me!"	Lee Seung-hwan	Earliest on-screen appearance	
2003	"Flower"	Lee Seung-hwan		
2004	"I Ask Myself"	Lee Seung-hwan		
2004	"Fake Love Song"	Lee Seung-hwan		
2006	"Letter"	Kim Jong-kook		
2008	"Saechimtteki"	45 rpm		
2009	"Call Me"	Taegoon		
2009	"Super Star"	Taegoon		
2012	"Alone in Love"	Lee Seung-gi		
2012	"Aren't We Friends"	Lee Seung-gi		
2013	"Eraser"	So Ji-sub		
2014	"My Dear"	Herself		
2014	"You Are So Beautiful"	Herself with Super Junior, EXO, Etc.		
2015	"Insensible"	Lee Hong-gi		
2017	"Wish"	Jung Joon-il		
2021	"Free Flight"	Dvwn		
