= List of awards and nominations received by Park Shin-hye =

Park Shin-hye awards and nominations
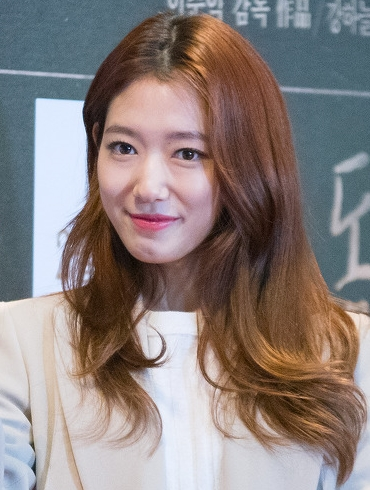
- Park in 2016
Awards and nominations
Award	Wins	Nominations
APAN Star Awards	1	3
Asia Artist Awards	2	0
Asia Rainbow TV Awards	1	0
Baeksang Arts Awards	6	4
Bucheon International Fantastic Film Festival	1	0
China TV Drama Awards	1	0
KBS Drama Awards	1	0
Korea Drama Awards	0	3
Korean Association of Film Critics Awards	1	0
Korean Film Awards	0	1
LeTV Movie and Drama Awards	1	0
MBC Drama Awards	0	1
MBC Entertainment Awards	1	0
SBS Drama Awards	10	2
Seoul International Drama Awards	0	2
Seoul International Youth Film Festival	0	1
tvN10 Awards	0	1
Other awards	4	4

Totals (Note: Certain award groups do not simply award one winner. They acknowledge several different recipients, have runners-up, and have third place. Since this is a specific recognition and is different from losing an award, runner-up mentions are considered wins in this award tally. For simplification and to avoid errors, each award in this list has been presumed to have had a prior nomination.)
- Wins: 30
- Nominations: 51

This is a list of awards and nominations received by South Korean model, singer, and actress Park Shin-hye.

== Awards and nominations ==
Name of the award ceremony, year presented, category, nominee of the award, and the result of the nomination
Award ceremony	Year	Category	Nominee / Work	Result	Ref.
APAN Star Awards	2013	Acting Award	Flower Boys Next Door	Nominated	
APAN Star Awards	2014	Excellence Award, Actress in a Miniseries	The Heirs	Won	
APAN Star Awards	2015	Top Excellence Award, Actress in a Miniseries	Pinocchio	Nominated	
APAN Star Awards	2016	Top Excellence Award, Actress in a Miniseries	Doctors	Nominated	
Asia Artist Awards	2016	Best Artist Award, Actress	Doctors	Won	
Asia Artist Awards	2017	Asia Icon	Park Shin-hye	Won	
Asia Philanthropy Awards	2019	Special Award: Philanthropic Celebrity of the year	Park Shin-hye	Won	
Asia Rainbow TV Awards	2014	Outstanding Leading Actress	The Heirs	Won	
Baeksang Arts Awards	2008	Best New Actress – Television	Kimcheed Radish Cubes	Nominated	
Baeksang Arts Awards	2011	Most Popular Actress (Film)	Cyrano Agency	Won	
Baeksang Arts Awards	2012	Most Popular Actress (TV)	Heartstrings	Won	
Baeksang Arts Awards	2013	Best Supporting Actress – Film	Miracle in Cell No. 7	Nominated	
Baeksang Arts Awards	2013	Most Popular Actress (Film)	Miracle in Cell No. 7	Won	
Baeksang Arts Awards	2014	Most Popular Actress (TV)	The Heirs	Won	
Baeksang Arts Awards	2015	Most Popular Actress (Film)	The Royal Tailor	Won	
Baeksang Arts Awards	2015	Best Actress – Television	Pinocchio	Nominated	
Baeksang Arts Awards	2015	iQiyi Star Award	Park Shin-hye	Won	
Baeksang Arts Awards	2017	Best Actress – Television	Doctors	Nominated	
Bucheon International Fantastic Film Festival	2013	Fantasia Award	Miracle in Cell No. 7	Won	
Busan International Advertising Festival	2016	Best Korean spokesmodel in China	Park Shin-hye	Won	
China TV Drama Awards	2013	Popular Foreign Actress	The Heirs	Won	
KBS Drama Awards	2012	Best Actress in a One-Act Special	Don't Worry, I'm a Ghost	Won	
Korean Association of Film Critics Awards	2013	Best Supporting Actress	Miracle in Cell No. 7	Won	
Korea Drama Awards	2015	Top Excellence Award, Actress	Pinocchio	Nominated	
Korea Drama Awards	2016	Top Excellence Award, Actress	Doctors	Nominated	
Korea Drama Awards	2019	Top Excellence Award, Actress	Memories of the Alhambra	Nominated	
Korean Film Awards	2010	Best Supporting Actress	Cyrano Agency	Nominated	
K-Star Magazine Star Awards Ceremony	2014	Popularity Award	The Heirs	Won	
LeTV Movie and Drama Awards	2011	Popular Asian Star	Park Shin-hye	Won	
MBC Drama Awards	2007	Best New Actress	Kimcheed Radish Cubes	Nominated	
MBC Entertainment Awards	2007	Best Newcomer in a Variety Show	Fantastic Partner	Won	
Mnet 20's Choice Awards	2011	Hot Campus Goddess	Park Shin-hye	Nominated	
Mnet 20's Choice Awards	2013	20's Movie Star	Miracle in Cell No. 7	Nominated	
SBS Drama Awards	2003	Best Young Actress	Stairway to Heaven	Won	
SBS Drama Awards	2009	Excellence Award, Actress in a Drama Special	You're Beautiful	Nominated	
SBS Drama Awards	2009	New Star Award	You're Beautiful	Won	
SBS Drama Awards	2013	Excellence Award, Actress in Drama Special	The Heirs	Won	
SBS Drama Awards	2013	Top 10 Stars	The Heirs	Won	
SBS Drama Awards	2013	Best Couple Award (with Lee Min-ho)	The Heirs	Won	
SBS Drama Awards	2014	Top Excellence Award, Actress in a Drama Special	Pinocchio	Won	
SBS Drama Awards	2014	Top 10 Stars	Pinocchio	Won	
SBS Drama Awards	2014	Best Couple Award (with Lee Jong-suk)	Pinocchio	Won	
SBS Drama Awards	2016	Grand Prize (Daesang)	Doctors	Nominated	
SBS Drama Awards	2016	Top Excellence Award, Actress in a Fantasy & Genre Drama	Doctors	Won	
SBS Drama Awards	2016	Top 10 Stars	Doctors	Won	
SBS Drama Awards	2024	Director's Award	The Judge from Hell	Won	
SBS Drama Awards	2024	Best Couple Award (with Kim Jae-young)	The Judge from Hell	Won	
Seoul International Drama Awards	2014	Outstanding Korean Actress	The Heirs	Nominated	
Seoul International Drama Awards	2014	People's Choice Actress	The Heirs	Nominated	
Seoul International Youth Film Festival	2014	Best Young Actress	The Heirs	Nominated	
Style Icon Awards	2013	The Natural-Born Beauty	Park Shin-hye	Nominated	
Style Icon Awards	2014	Top 10 Style Icons	Park Shin-hye	Nominated	
tvN10 Awards	2016	Romantic-Comedy Queen	Flower Boys Next Door	Nominated	

== Other accolades ==
=== State honors ===
Name of country, year given, and name of honor
Country or Organization	Year	Honor or Award	Ref.
South Korea (Note: Honors are given at the Korean Popular Culture and Arts Awards, arranged by the Korea Creative Content Agency and hosted by the Ministry of Culture, Sports and Tourism. They are awarded to those who have contributed to the arts and South Korea's pop culture.)	2015	Prime Minister's Commendation	

=== Listicles ===
Name of publisher, year listed, name of listicle, and placement
Publisher	Year	List	Placement	Ref.
Forbes	2015	Korea Power Celebrity 40	33rd	
Forbes	2017	Korea Power Celebrity 40	12th	
Forbes	2021	Korea Power Celebrity 40	40th	
Forbes	2022	Korea Power Celebrity 40	33rd	
