= Desperate Mrs. Seonju =

2024 South Korean television series

- Promotional poster
- Hangul: 친절한 선주씨
- Lit.: The Kind Miss Seon-ju
- RR: Chinjeolhan Seonjussi
- MR: Ch'injŏrhan Sŏnjussi
- Genre: Melodrama; Romance; Revenge
- Written by: Seo Jung
- Directed by: Kim Heung-do; Kang Tae-heum
- Starring: Shim Yi-young; Song Chang-eui; Choi Jung-yoon; Jung Young-seop
- Music by: Jeong Seung-hyeon; Seo Seong-won; Lee Jeong-soo; (Songs)
- Country of origin: South Korea
- Original language: Korean
- No. of episodes: 126

Production
- Producer: Lee Hyeong-seon
- Running time: 30 minutes
- Production company: MBC C&I

Original release
- Network: MBC TV
- Release: November 18, 2024 – June 2, 2025

Desperate Mrs. Seonju (Korean: 친절한 선주씨) is a 2024–2025 South Korean television series starring Shim Yi-young in the title role, along with Song Chang-eui, Choi Jung-yoon, and Jung Young-seop. It aired on MBC TV from November 18, 2024, to June 2, 2025, every Monday to Friday at 19:05 (KST).

== Synopsis ==
Pi Seon-ju desperately tries to protect her broken marriage, which was destroyed by the mistress, Jin Sang-ah. However, she ultimately fails as her shameless husband, Jeon Nam-jin, chooses the mistress over his family. As Seon-ju becomes desperate to rebuild her life, she ends up getting entangled with Sang-ah's husband, Kim So-woo, and they develop a romantic relationship after multiple encounters.

== Cast ==
=== Main ===
- Shim Yi-young as Pi Seon-ju

A neighborhood interior designer with a strong will to survive.

- Song Chang-eui as Kim So-woo

The team leader of Jin Architecture.

- Choi Jung-yoon as Jin Sang-ah
- Jung Young-seop as Jeon Nam-jin

=== Supporting ===
==== People around Seon-ju ====
- Lee Hyo-chun as Han Man-eun

Seon-ju's mother.

- Kim Rosa as Pi Jin-ju

Seon-ju's eldest sister.

- Cheon Ye-ju as Pi Mi-ju

Seon-ju's youngest sister.

- Kim Min-chae as Jeon Ji-hyun

Seon-ju's daughter.

- Kang Ji-yong as Kang Dong-won

Jin-ju's son.

==== People around So-woo ====
- Yang Woo-hyuk as Kim Tae-ri

So-woo's son.

==== People around Sang-ah ====
- Kim Hye-jeong as Sim Sun-ae

Sang-ah's mother.

- Kim Myung-soo as Jin Joong-bae

Sang-ah's father.

- Lim Sa-rang as Jin Chu-ah

Sang-ah's sister.

==== People around Nam-jin ====
- Wang Hye-jin as Wang Yeon-ae

Nam-jin's mother.

==== Others ====
- Kang Woo-yeon as Jeong Woo-sang
- Kim Jun-hyun as Jeong Tae-sang
- Lee Chae-kyung as Oh Hye-ran

Woo-sang and Tae-sang's mother.

- Kim Hye-young as Regular client in the beauty salon

== Production ==
=== Development ===
The working title of Desperate Mrs. Seonju was The Kind Miss Seon-ju. Jang Jae-hoon conceived the series, Seo Jung wrote the script, and Kim Heung-dong, who previously directed Everybody Say Kimchi (2014), and Kang Tae-heum, who previously directed The Third Marriage (2023–2024), co-directed it. It is produced by MBC C&I.

=== Casting ===
Shim Yi-young was reportedly cast as the lead on June 28, 2024, and had confirmed her appearance on August 8. In September 2024, Song Chang-eui and Choi Jung-yoon were reportedly cast and confirmed their appearances, respectively. On October 8, the casting lineup, which includes Shim, Song, Choi, and Jung Young-seop, was officially confirmed.

== Original soundtrack ==
=== Part 1 ===
Released on December 9, 2024
No.	Title	Lyrics	Music	Artist	Length
1.	"I've Got Me" (내가 있잖아)	Arie; Lee Jong-soo	Lee Jong-soo	Arie	3:11
2.	"I've Got Me" (내가 있잖아; Inst.)		Lee Jong-soo		3:11
Total length:					6:22

=== Part 2 ===
Released on December 25, 2024
No.	Title	Lyrics	Music	Artist	Length
1.	"I'll Take You In My Arms" (그대를 안아줄게요)	Lee Jong-soo; Landscape	Lee Jong-soo; Landscape	Son Tae-jin	3:40
2.	"I'll Take You In My Arms" (그대를 안아줄게요; Inst.)		Lee Jong-soo; Landscape		3:40
Total length:					7:22

=== Part 3 ===
Released on December 30, 2024
No.	Title	Lyrics	Music	Artist	Length
1.	"My Lips Are" (내 입술이)	Lee Jong-soo; Landscape	Lee Jong-soo; Landscape	Jo Jung-min	4:13
2.	"My Lips Are" (내 입술이; Inst.)		Lee Jong-soo; Landscape		4:13
Total length:					8:26

=== Part 4 ===
Released on January 13, 2025
No.	Title	Lyrics	Music	Artist	Length
1.	"Stay Here"	Seo Jeong; Landscape	Lee Jong-soo; Landscape	HAEY	4:11
2.	"Stay Here" (Inst.)		Lee Jong-soo; Landscape		4:11
Total length:					8:22

== Viewership ==
Desperate Mrs. Seonju : South Korea viewers per episode (thousands)

Episodes	Episode number																							
Episodes	1	2	3	4	5	6	7	8	9	10	11	12	13	14	15	16	17	18	19	20	21	22	23	24
1–24	778	816	825	876	752	831	817	695	728	726	867	723	740	605	709	651	689	717	679	734	647	775	808	757
25–48	821	946	998	980	935	925	1127	1050	1086	999	1061	1123	1148	1012	1068	1003	1098	1056	984	1069	1109	1097	1163	1051
49–72	1067	1089	979	1032	972	1011	1054	974	952	1022	991	1105	1102	1077	1031	1028	1118	1033	1022	897	1034	1081	1140	1007
73–96	901	1006	1068	1027	1011	1042	987	1024	924	1059	1008	970	1017	1033	1005	989	971	955	1025	956	1083	1105	983	951
97–120	781	930	1076	940	1057	939	1026	937	863	1052	955	926	1126	956	992	1025	911	907	1010	937	985	1073	1018	949
121–126	989	911	1064	1059	987	1010	–																	

Source: Audience measurement performed nationwide by Nielsen Korea.

Average TV viewership ratings
Ep.	Original broadcast date	Average audience share	
Ep.	Original broadcast date	Nielsen Korea	
Ep.	Original broadcast date	Nationwide	Seoul
1	November 18, 2024	4.8% (12th)	4.7% (9th)
2	November 19, 2024	5.1% (11th)	4.7% (10th)
3	November 20, 2024	4.8% (10th)	4.5% (11th)
4	November 21, 2024	5.1% (8th)	4.4% (8th)
5	November 22, 2024	4.5% (13th)	4.4% (13th)
6	November 25, 2024	4.9% (12th)	4.4% (13th)
7	November 26, 2024	5.2% (8th)	4.0% (11th)
8	November 27, 2024	4.5% (13th)	3.5% (16th)
9	November 28, 2024	4.8% (10th)	4.6% (10th)
10	November 29, 2024	4.5% (16th)	3.9% (17th)
11	December 2, 2024	5.5% (10th)	5.0% (9th)
12	December 3, 2024	4.5% (10th)	3.8% (14th)
13	December 5, 2024	4.1% (14th)	3.6% (14th)
14	December 9, 2024	3.8% (18th)	N/A
15	December 16, 2024	4.3% (12th)	3.8% (14th)
16	December 17, 2024	4.4% (8th)	4.1% (10th)
17	December 18, 2024	4.3% (11th)	3.8% (12th)
18	December 19, 2024	4.4% (9th)	3.8% (9th)
19	December 20, 2024	4.4% (11th)	4.1% (14th)
20	December 23, 2024	4.5% (12th)	3.6% (17th)
21	December 24, 2024	3.9% (13th)	3.3% (14th)
22	December 25, 2024	4.3% (13th)	3.7% (15th)
23	December 26, 2024	4.6% (9th)	3.8% (11th)
24	December 30, 2024	4.5% (8th)	3.9% (8th)
25	December 31, 2024	4.4% (9th)	3.9% (9th)
26	January 1, 2025	5.0% (11th)	4.5% (12th)
27	January 2, 2025	5.4% (9th)	4.8% (9th)
28	January 3, 2025	5.4% (9th)	4.9% (9th)
29	January 6, 2025	5.4% (9th)	5.0% (9th)
30	January 7, 2025	5.3% (8th)	4.6% (9th)
31	January 8, 2025	6.5% (8th)	6.0% (8th)
32	January 9, 2025	5.8% (8th)	5.5% (6th)
33	January 10, 2025	5.8% (10th)	5.3% (12th)
34	January 13, 2025	5.8% (9th)	5.4% (7th)
35	January 14, 2025	5.8% (8th)	5.4% (7th)
36	January 16, 2025	6.3% (8th)	6.0% (7th)
37	January 17, 2025	6.0% (10th)	6.2% (7th)
38	January 20, 2025	5.9% (8th)	5.3% (8th)
39	January 21, 2025	6.0% (8th)	5.5% (6th)
40	January 22, 2025	6.0% (8th)	5.4% (7th)
41	January 23, 2025	6.3% (7th)	5.6% (6th)
42	January 24, 2025	5.8% (10th)	5.2% (9th)
43	January 30, 2025	5.2% (13th)	4.7% (13th)
44	January 31, 2025	6.1% (9th)	6.3% (8th)
45	February 3, 2025	6.2% (9th)	5.7% (9th)
46	February 4, 2025	6.1% (8th)	5.7% (8th)
47	February 5, 2025	6.5% (8th)	6.0% (7th)
48	February 6, 2025	6.2% (8th)	5.5% (7th)
49	February 7, 2025	5.9% (10th)	5.5% (11th)
50	February 10, 2025	6.4% (8th)	5.9% (7th)
51	February 11, 2025	5.7% (7th)	5.2% (8th)
52	February 12, 2025	5.6% (8th)	4.8% (9th)
53	February 13, 2025	5.8% (8th)	5.4% (7th)
54	February 14, 2025	5.5% (10th)	4.8% (11th)
55	February 17, 2025	5.9% (9th)	5.5% (8th)
56	February 18, 2025	5.6% (8th)	5.0% (8th)
57	February 19, 2025	5.4% (8th)	4.9% (9th)
58	February 20, 2025	5.7% (8th)	5.0% (8th)
59	February 21, 2025	5.8% (11th)	5.5% (11th)
60	February 24, 2025	6.0% (8th)	5.4% (8th)
61	February 25, 2025	6.4% (7th)	5.5% (8th)
62	February 27, 2025	6.0% (8th)	5.6% (7th)
63	February 28, 2025	5.9% (10th)	5.3% (10th)
64	March 3, 2025	5.8% (12th)	5.2% (12th)
65	March 4, 2025	6.2% (7th)	5.7% (6th)
66	March 5, 2025	5.8% (8th)	5.2% (8th)
67	March 6, 2025	5.9% (7th)	5.5% (7th)
68	March 7, 2025	5.0% (10th)	4.6% (12th)
69	March 10, 2025	5.7% (8th)	5.3% (6th)
70	March 11, 2025	6.2% (7th)	5.7% (6th)
71	March 12, 2025	6.4% (7th)	6.2% (6th)
72	March 13, 2025	5.8% (8th)	5.7% (7th)
73	March 14, 2025	5.4% (10th)	5.0% (10th)
74	March 17, 2025	5.9% (8th)	5.4% (6th)
75	March 18, 2025	6.2% (4th)	5.6% (6th)
76	March 19, 2025	6.2% (7th)	5.2% (7th)
77	March 20, 2025	5.9% (7th)	5.2% (8th)
78	March 21, 2025	5.7% (10th)	5.2% (8th)
79	March 24, 2025	5.7% (7th)	5.0% (8th)
80	March 25, 2025	5.8% (7th)	5.5% (7th)
81	March 26, 2025	5.7% (7th)	5.3% (6th)
82	March 27, 2025	6.5% (5th)	5.7% (4th)
83	March 28, 2025	5.7% (10th)	5.3% (9th)
84	March 31, 2025	5.6% (8th)	5.1% (6th)
85	April 1, 2025	5.9% (6th)	4.9% (7th)
86	April 2, 2025	6.1% (7th)	5.6% (7th)
87	April 3, 2025	6.0% (6th)	5.2% (6th)
88	April 7, 2025	5.9% (6th)	5.3% (6th)
89	April 8, 2025	5.7% (7th)	5.3% (6th)
90	April 9, 2025	5.9% (7th)	5.5% (7th)
91	April 10, 2025	5.9% (5th)	5.4% (6th)
92	April 11, 2025	5.6% (7th)	5.4% (7th)
93	April 14, 2025	6.3% (6th)	5.9% (6th)
94	April 15, 2025	6.0% (6th)	5.8% (6th)
95	April 16, 2025	5.8% (7th)	5.5% (8th)
96	April 17, 2025	5.9% (6th)	6.0% (5th)
97	April 18, 2025	4.7% (11th)	4.8% (9th)
98	April 21, 2025	5.6% (8th)	5.4% (7th)
99	April 22, 2025	6.3% (7th)	6.1% (5th)
100	April 23, 2025	5.6% (7th)	5.6% (6th)
101	April 24, 2025	6.2% (6th)	5.9% (6th)
102	April 25, 2025	5.4% (8th)	5.1% (8th)
103	April 28, 2025	5.8% (6th)	5.9% (4th)
104	April 29, 2025	5.5% (7th)	5.3% (6th)
105	April 30, 2025	5.3% (7th)	5.4% (6th)
106	May 1, 2025	6.2% (6th)	5.5% (6th)
107	May 2, 2025	5.2% (8th)	5.4% (8th)
108	May 5, 2025	5.2% (6th)	5.5% (5th)
109	May 6, 2025	6.2% (7th)	5.7% (6th)
110	May 7, 2025	5.7% (7th)	5.5% (6th)
111	May 8, 2025	5.7% (6th)	5.5% (6th)
112	May 9, 2025	6.3% (7th)	6.3% (6th)
113	May 12, 2025	5.6% (6th)	
114	May 13, 2025	5.4% (6th)	5.2% (6th)
115	May 14, 2025	5.9% (7th)	6.2% (5th)
116	May 15, 2025	5.7% (7th)	5.8% (6th)
117	May 16, 2025	6.0% (7th)	
118	May 19, 2025	6.0% (6th)	
119	May 20, 2025	6.2% (7th)	6.4% (4th)
120	May 21, 2025	5.9% (7th)	5.7% (6th)
121	May 22, 2025	5.8% (6th)	5.7% (6th)
122	May 26, 2025	5.3% (6th)	4.9% (6th)
123	May 28, 2025	6.3% (6th)	6.2% (6th)
124	May 29, 2025	6.4% (7th)	6.4% (4th)
125	May 30, 2025	6.1% (7th)	5.9% (7th)
126	June 2, 2025	6.0% (6th)	6.1% (6th)
Average		—	—
In the table above, the blue numbers represent the lowest ratings and the red numbers represent the highest ratings.; N/A denotes ratings that were not published.

== Accolades ==
=== Awards and nominations ===
Name of the award ceremony, year presented, category, nominee of the award, and the result of the nomination
Award	Year	Category	Recipient(s)	Result	Ref.
APAN Star Awards	2025	Top Excellence Award, Actor in a Serial Drama	Song Chang-eui	Nominated	
APAN Star Awards	2025	Excellence Award, Actress in a Serial Drama	Shim Yi-young	Nominated	
MBC Drama Awards	2025	Top Excellence Award, Actor in a Daily Drama	Song Chang-eui	Won	
MBC Drama Awards	2025	Top Excellence Award, Actress in a Daily Drama	Choi Jung-yoon	Nominated	
MBC Drama Awards	2025	Top Excellence Award, Actress in a Daily Drama	Shim Yi-young	Nominated	
