= Kim Hye-young =

North Korean actress (born 1972)

- Born: Kim Hye-young; 24 July 1972 (age 54); Chongjin, North Hamgyong Province, North Korea
- Other name: Kim Hae-young
- Education: Pyongyang University
- Alma mater: Dongguk University
- Occupations: Actress; Singer; Comedian; Model
- Years active: 1990 – present
- Agent(s): C&O
- Spouses: Kim Sung-tae (m. 2009; div. 2013) Kim Tae-seop (m. 2015; div. 2019)
- Children: 2

Kim Hye-young (Korean: 김혜영; sometimes Romanized as Kim Hae-young) is a North Korean-born actress, singer, comedian, and model who is active in the South Korean entertainment industry. She defected to South Korea with her family in 1998. She was one of leading actress in North Korean films such as The Female Doctor, True Masters, and The Day I Entered College. She was a famous actress in North Korea during 1990s.

== Early life and education ==
Kim Hye-young was born in a rural area of North Korea to a father who worked in a mine and a mother who worked on a collective farm. She described her childhood as being defined by a scarcity of food.

She studied acting at the Pyongyang University of Theater and Cinema and became a well-known film star in North Korea before her defection. She starred in the North Korean film Female Doctor, a film she still regards highly. According to Kim, her family did not suffer from the extreme food shortages experienced by others as her father earned US dollars working for a state trading company, allowing them an above-average standard of living. Job prospects for her family were limited in Pyongyang because they had relatives living abroad.

In January 1999, reports surfaced that the 26-year-old actress had defected to South Korea, part of a string of defections by members of the North Korean elite.

After arriving in South Korea, she continued her education, enrolling as a junior at Dongguk University in 2001. In 2003, she graduated with a degree in theater and cinema, becoming the first person to earn acting degrees in both North and South Korea.

== Career in South Korea ==
After settling in South Korea, Kim Hye-young embarked on an active career spanning multiple entertainment fields, including acting, singing, modeling, and comedy.

=== Acting ===
Kim has appeared in various television dramas and comedy shows. Her acting credits include starring in the SBS drama Deogi and appearing on the popular KBS comedy show Gag Concert. She has also performed in stage musicals, such as a tour of Glad To See You.

=== Music ===
In addition to her acting work, Kim has pursued a career as a singer and, after graduating from university, expressed interest in debuting in Japan.

== Personal life ==
Kim married a South Korean actor, Kim Sung-tae, in November 2009. The couple met while performing in the same play the year prior. She was previously married in 2002, a marriage that ended in divorce in 2005.

== Filmography ==
=== Television series ===
Year	Title	Role	Ref.
1990	Love on a Jujube Tree	Ms. Young	
2000	Deogi	Mi-soo	
2024	Desperate Mrs. Seonju	Regular client in the beauty salon	

=== Film ===
Year	Title	Role	Ref.
1993	Female Doctor	Doctor	

== Ambassadorship ==
- In 2004, she was the National Youth Heads of Households Support Ambassador.

== Awards and nominations ==
- 2007 World Makeup Art Fair Best Makeup Award
