= Kim Ah-young =

South Korean actress (born 1994)

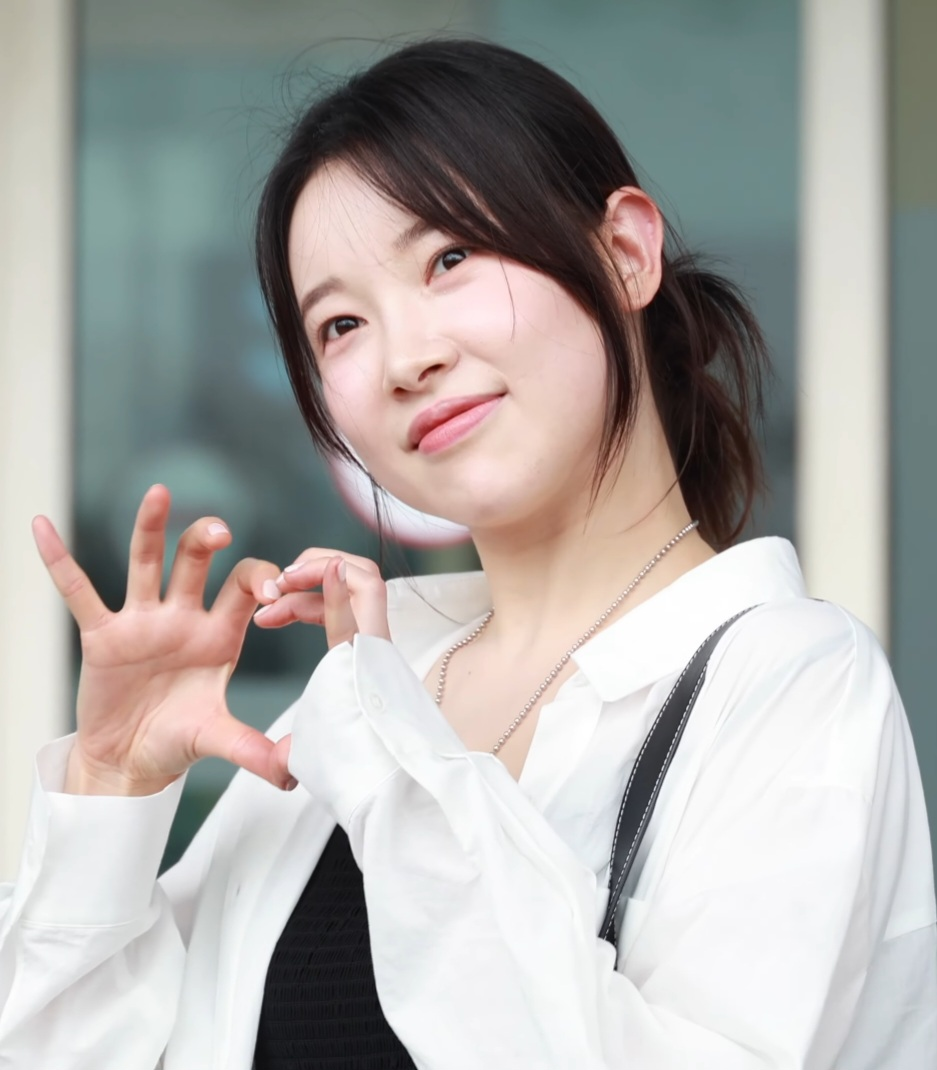
- Kim in 2024
- Born: October 31, 1994 (age 31); Bucheon, South Korea
- Education: Yong In University – Bachelor in Theater
- Occupation: Actress
- Agent: AIMC

Korean name
- Hangul: 김아영
- RR: Gim Ayeong
- MR: Kim Ayŏng

Kim Ah-young (Korean: 김아영; born October 31, 1994) is a South Korean actress.

== Personal life ==
Kim was born on October 31, 1994, in Bucheon, South Korea. Kim graduated from Yong In University with a bachelor's degree in theater.

== Career ==
Kim made her debut in August 2019 with the fourth season of Naver TV's web series Short Paper, playing the supporting role of Young-ah.

In September 2021, Kim made her television debut in EBS's The Moment the Heart Shines, portraying the supporting role of Park Ji-hye.

In November 2022, Kim appeared in the third season of Coupang Play's Saturday Night Live Korea as a regular cast member, for which she won the Best New Female Entertainer at the 2nd Blue Dragon Series Awards.

In February 2023, Kim starred in tvN's The Heavenly Idol, playing the cameo role of a staff at LLM Entertainment. A month later, she signed an exclusive contract with AIMC. In July 2023, she appeared on MBC's Midnight Horror Story as the show host. In the same month, she continued her role as a regular cast member in the fourth season of Coupang Play's Saturday Night Live Korea. In December 2023, she starred in JTBC's Welcome to Samdal-ri, playing the supporting role of Go Eun-bi.

In January 2024, Kim starred in MBC's A Good Day to Be a Dog, playing the cameo role of Do Min-kyung. Three months later, she continued her role as a regular cast member in the fifth season of Coupang Play's Saturday Night Live Korea. In June 2024, she starred in JTBC's Miss Night and Day, playing the supporting role of Do Ga-young. In September 2024, she starred in SBS's The Judge from Hell, playing the supporting role of Lee Ah-rong. In the same month, she starred in KBS' Dog Knows Everything, playing the cameo role of Jjumi.

== Endorsements ==
In February 2023, Kim was selected to endorse Donga Otsuka's Oronamin C multivitamin drink. A month later, she was selected to endorse Binggrae's banana-flavored milk. In September, she was selected to endorse Daewoong Pharmaceutical's Urusa. Three months later, she was selected to endorse Lotte Wellfood's chewing gum products.

In May 2024, Kim was selected to endorse Bausch + Lomb Korea's Ultra One Day contact lens.

== Filmography ==
Key
†	Denotes films that have not yet been released

=== Television series ===
Television series appearances
Year	Title	Role	Notes	Ref.
2021	The Moment the Heart Shines	Park Ji-hye		
2023	The Heavenly Idol	LLM Entertainment staff	Cameo	
2023	Welcome to Samdal-ri	Go Eun-bi		
2024	A Good Day to Be a Dog	Do Min-kyung	Cameo (Episode 14)	
2024	Miss Night and Day	Do Ga-young		
2024	The Judge from Hell	Lee Ah-rong		
2024	Dog Knows Everything	Jjumi	Cameo (Episode 1)	
2026	Boyfriend on Demand			

=== Web series ===
Web series appearances
Year	Title	Role	Notes	Ref.
2019	Short Paper	Young-ah	Season 4	

=== Television shows ===
Television shows appearances
Year	Title	Role	Notes	Ref.
2022–2024	Saturday Night Live Korea	Cast member	Season 3–5	
2023	Midnight Horror Story	Host	Season 3	

== Awards and nominations ==
Name of the award ceremony, year presented, category, nominee of the award, and the result of the nomination
Award ceremony	Year	Category	Nominee / Work	Result	Ref.
Blue Dragon Series Awards	2023	Best New Female Entertainer	Saturday Night Live Korea (Season 3)	Won	
KBS Drama Awards	2025	Best Actress in Drama Special/TV Cinema	Love Track: Love Hotel	Won	
Korea First Brand Awards	2024	Hot Icon Award	Kim Ah-young	Won	
SBS Drama Awards	2024	Excellence Award, Actress in a Miniseries	The Judge from Hell	Won	
