= Song Chang-eui =

South Korean actor

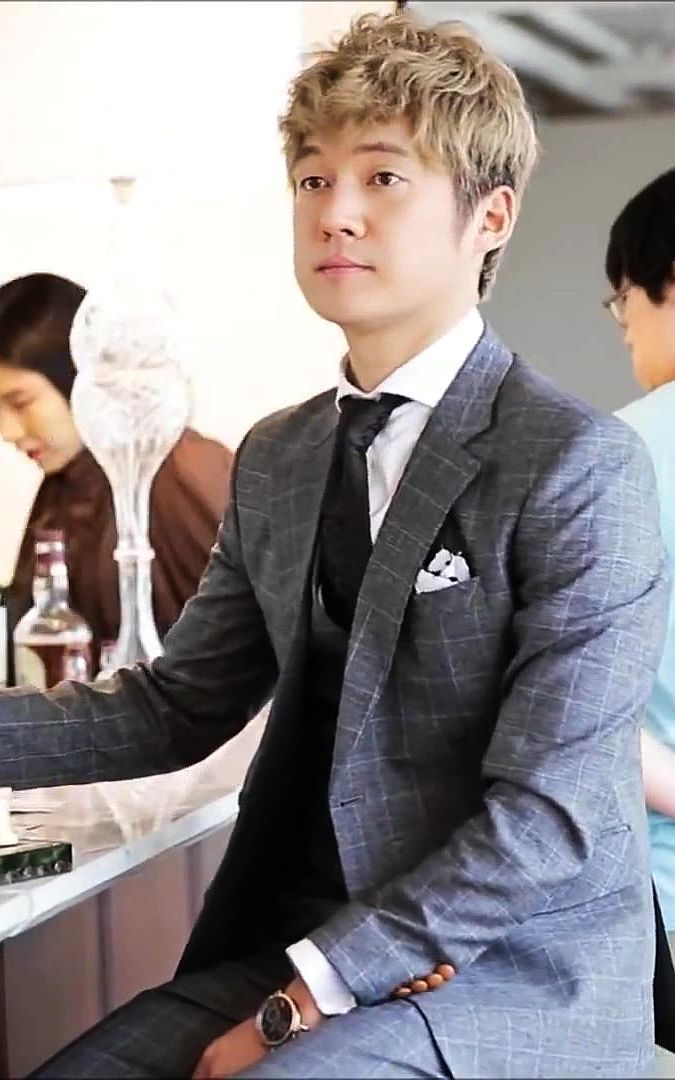
- Song in 2014
- Born: 24 January 1979 (age 47); Seoul, South Korea
- Education: Seoul Institute of the Arts – Theater
- Occupation: Actor
- Years active: 2002–present
- Agent: YK Media Plus
- Spouse: Oh Ji-young (m. 2016)
- Children: 1

Korean name
- Hangul: 송창의
- Hanja: 宋昶儀
- RR: Song Changui
- MR: Song Ch'angŭi
- Website: changeui.com

Song Chang-eui (born January 24, 1979) is a South Korean actor. Though better known as a musical theatre actor, notably in Hedwig and the Angry Inch and Gwanghwamun Love Song, Song has also starred in television dramas such as The Scales of Providence and Life Is Beautiful.

== Career ==
Song Chang-eui began his career in musical theatre in 2002's Blue Saigon. Most famous for playing a transgender rocker in Hedwig and the Angry Inch, he also starred in the stage adaptation of Hollywood film The Graduate, the musical adaptation of romantic comedy 200 Pounds Beauty with Bada, a musical based on The Sorrows of Young Werther, popular German musical Elisabeth with Ock Joo-hyun, and Korea's first jukebox musical Gwanghwamun Younga (younga is the Korean word for "love song" or "sonata") featuring the hit songs of the late composer Lee Young-hoon.

After doing small roles on television starting 2005, Song gained fame in 2007 when he starred in Golden Bride, a drama about an inter-cultural marriage between an elite Korean man (Song) and a young Vietnamese woman (played by Lee Young-ah). He followed that with leading roles in the revenge court thriller The Scales of Providence, and the post-war film Once Upon a Time in Seoul. The latter, titled Boys Don't Cry in Korean, is about two orphaned friends (played by Song and Lee Wan) who become involved in the black market to escape poverty. Song had to lose 7 kilograms (15.4 pounds) and shave his head for his role. In 2009 he was cast as the antagonist in the Kwon Sang-woo starrer Cinderella Man, a Prince and the Pauper tale set in the world of fashion merchandising, which drew lackluster ratings.

Penned by renowned drama writer Kim Soo-hyun, the 2010 weekend family drama Life Is Beautiful became memorable and somewhat controversial for its depiction of a loving, functional relationship between two homosexual men, the first Korean show to do so in the primetime slot of a public network. The drama was a hit with average ratings of 20%, and Song earned praise for his portrayal of a gentle, kind doctor of internal medicine, who happens to be openly gay and in love with Lee Sang-woo's divorcee character.

Song and Seo Ji-hye played a married couple in melodrama A Lone Tree (the Korean title Tree that Sleeps Standing speaks to the theme of a person's desire to stay next to and support a loved one), then he had a supporting role in A Reason to Live, a contemplative film on grief and forgiveness starring Song Hye-kyo.

He returned to television in the 2011 campus romance Heartstrings (also known as You've Fallen for Me). The drama was co-produced by the Seoul Institute of the Arts, which provided its campus for filming. Song, a graduate of the arts-specialized university, said the classrooms, library and the atmosphere made him feel nostalgic. He and co-star Park Shin-hye had previously worked together as voice actors for the local hand-drawn animated film Green Days: Dinosaur and I.

Song starred in two series in 2012: Syndrome, a medical drama on cable about neurosurgeons, and The Great Seer, a historical epic about the founding of the Joseon Dynasty. Kim Soo-hyun cast him again in her 2013 weekend drama Thrice Married Woman, in which his character has lingering feelings for his ex-wife.

In 2014, Song played the titular character in police procedural Dr. Frost, adapted from the webtoon of the same title. He was then cast as a widowed father with a troubled son in the Make a Woman Cry (2015).

== Filmography ==
=== Film ===
Year	Title	Role	Notes	Ref.
2002	Emergency Act 19	adviser 2		
2005	My Girl and I	Park Jong-goo		
2007	Pacchigi! Love & Peace	Jin-sung		
2008	Once Upon a Time in Seoul	Tae-ho		
2010	A Lone Tree	Jung Gu-sang		
2011	Green Days: Dinosaur and I	Kim Cheol-soo	animated, (voice)	
2011	A Reason to Live	Ji-suk		
2020	Beyond That Mountain	Kim Ik-hyun		
2021	The Recon	Kang Sung-gu		

=== Television series ===
Year	Title	Role	Notes	Ref.
2005	Rainy Day on the Tenth	Yoon-seok		
2005	Wedding	Yoon Hyung-chul		
2005	The Youth in Barefoot	Hwang Joon-hyuk		
2005	Drama City: "My Sweet Bloody Lover"	Jin-woo	one act-drama	
2006	The 101st Proposal	Seo Hyun-joon		
2007	Golden Bride	Kang Jun-woo		
2007	Lee San, Wind of the Palace	Jeong Yak-yong		
2008	On Air	Himself	Cameo (episode 11)	
2008	The Scales of Providence	Jang Joon-ha		
2009	Cinderella Man	Lee Jae-min		
2010	Life Is Beautiful	Yang Tae-sub		
2011	Heartstrings	Kim Suk-hyun		
2011	A Thousand Days' Promise	Noh Young-soo		
2012	Syndrome	Cha Yeo-wook		
2012	The Great Seer	Lee Jung-geun		
2013	Thrice Married Woman	Jung Tae-won		
2014	Dr. Frost	Baek Nam-bong		
2015	Make a Woman Cry	Kang Jin-woo		
2017	The Secret of My Love	Han Ji-seob / Kang Jae-wook		
2018	Hide and Seek	Cha Eun-hyuk		
2023	Twinkling Watermelon	adult Kang Hyeon-yul	Cameo (episode 16)	
2024–2025	Desperate Mrs. Seonju	Kim So-woo		

=== Television shows ===
Year	Title	Role	Notes	Ref.
2021	The Cultural History of Spoons and Pots	Narrator	documentary history	

=== Music video appearances ===
Year	Song title	Artist
2005	"What My Tears Are Saying"	Kyun-woo
2005	"Sad Diary"	Kyun-woo
2006	"Alcohol"	Vibe
2007	"Yesterday is Different From Today"	Kim Ji-eun
2007	"Your Love is Enough"	Baek Ji-young
2007	"Please Find Her"	The Name
2008	"It Was You"	Kyun-woo
2015	"She Has Come"	99 (NINTYNINE)

== Theater ==
Year	Title	Role
2002	Blue Saigon	
2002	The Play	
2003	Songsan Yahwa	Kim Hyun
2003	Jesus Christ Superstar	Jesus Christ
2004	The Play X	
2004	Singin' in the Rain	Don Lockwood
2004	Funky Funky	
2006	Hedwig and the Angry Inch	Hedwig
2007	The Graduate	Benjamin Braddock
2008	200 Pounds Beauty	Han Sang-jun
2009	Hedwig and the Angry Inch	Hedwig
2010	Turandot	
2010	The Sorrows of Young Werther	Werther
2011	Gwanghwamun Love Song	Sang-hoon
2012	Elisabeth	Death
2012	Gwanghwamun Love Song	Sang-hoon
2013	Joseph and the Amazing Technicolor Dreamcoat	Joseph
2013	Hedwig and the Angry Inch	Hedwig
2014	Blood Brothers	Mickey
2015	Rebecca	Maxim de Winter
2016	Mata Hari	Armand
2019	I Loved You	Lee Joon-hyuk

== Discography ==
Album information	Track listing
I Love You - Golden Bride OST: Single; Released: January 7, 2008	Track listing: 1. 사랑합니다 (I Love You) - Song Chang-eui; 2. 사랑합니다 (Instrumental); 3. 사랑합니다 - Kim Ji-hoon
Love 101: EP; Released: March 28, 2008	Track listing: 1. 사랑이라는 이유로 (Virtue of Love) - Song Chang-eui; 2. 4월이 왔어 (April Has Come) - Wax
우주에서: Track 15 from Green Days: Dinosaur and I OST; Released: June 3, 2011	Track listing: 15. 우주에서 (featuring 철수) - Song Chang-eui and Park Shin-hye

== Awards and nominations ==
Year	Award	Category	Nominated work	Result
2007	SBS Drama Awards	Top 10 Stars	Golden Bride	Won
2007	SBS Drama Awards	Excellence Award, Actor in a Serial Drama	Golden Bride	Nominated
2008	44th Baeksang Arts Awards	Best New Actor (TV)	Golden Bride	Won
2008	SBS Drama Awards	Excellence Award, Actor in a Drama Special	The Scales of Providence	Nominated
2009	45th Baeksang Arts Awards	Best New Actor (Film)	Once Upon a Time in Seoul	Nominated
2009	17th Chunsa Film Art Awards	Best New Actor	Once Upon a Time in Seoul	Won
2009	46th Grand Bell Awards	Best New Actor	Once Upon a Time in Seoul	Nominated
2009	30th Blue Dragon Film Awards	Best New Actor	Once Upon a Time in Seoul	Nominated
2010	26th Korea Best Dresser Swan Awards	Best Dressed, Culture/문화인 category	—N/a	Won
2010	SBS Drama Awards	Excellence Award, Actor in a Weekend/Daily Drama	Life Is Beautiful	Won
2011	6th Asia Model Festival Awards	BBF Popular Star Award	—N/a	Won
2012	SBS Drama Awards	Excellence Award, Actor in a Drama Special	The Great Seer	Nominated
2014	SBS Drama Awards	Excellence Award, Actor in a Serial Drama	Thrice Married Woman	Won
2015	4th APAN Star Awards	Excellence Award, Actor in a Serial Drama	Make a Woman Cry	Nominated
2015	MBC Drama Awards	Top Excellence Award, Actor in a Serial Drama	Make a Woman Cry	Won
2017	KBS Drama Awards	Excellence Award, Actor in a Serial Drama	The Secret of My Love	Won
2018	6th APAN Star Awards	Excellence Award, Actor in a Serial Drama	The Secret of My Love	Nominated
2018	MBC Drama Awards	Top Excellence Award, Actor in a Weekend Special Project	Hide and Seek	Nominated
2020	14th SBS Entertainment Awards	Best Teamwork Award	Same Bed, Different Dreams 2: You Are My Destiny	Won
2025	MBC Drama Awards	Top Excellence Award, Actor in a Daily/Short Drama	Desperate Mrs. Seonju	Won
