= Park Shin-hye =

South Korean actress (born 1990)

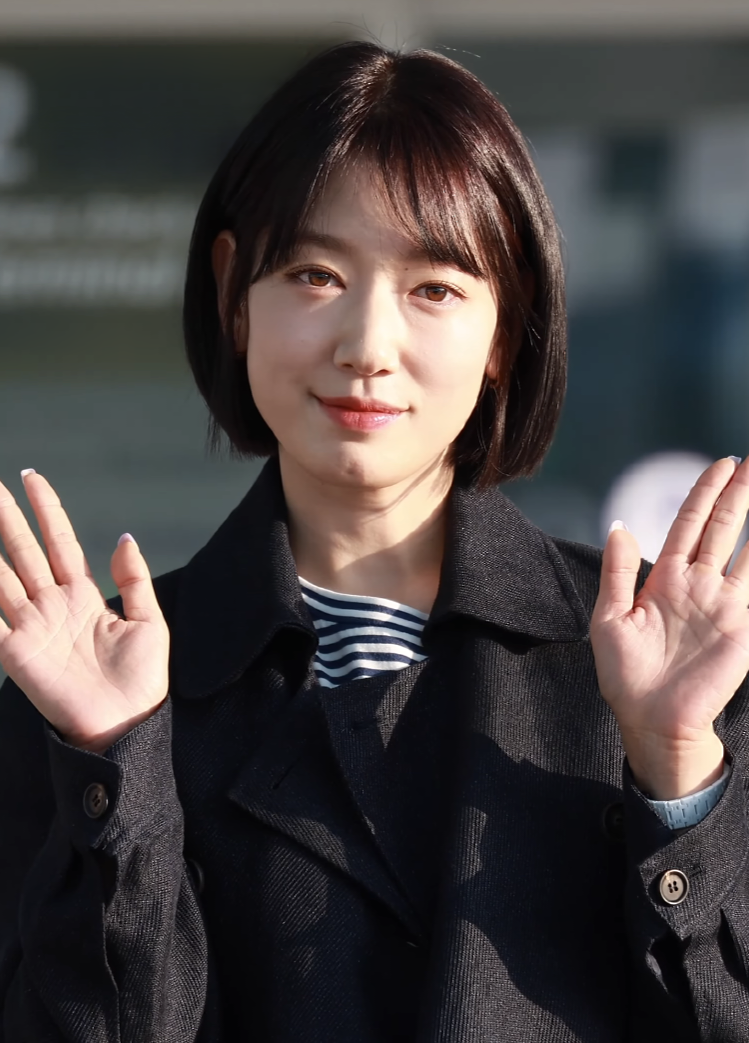
- Park in April 2025
- Born: February 18, 1990 (age 36); Gwangju, South Korea
- Education: Chung-Ang University
- Occupation: Actress
- Years active: 2001–present
- Agent: S.A.L.T Entertainment
- Works: Filmography; discography
- Spouse: Choi Tae-joon (m. 2022)
- Children: 2
- Family: Park Shin-won (brother)
- Awards: Full list

Korean name
- Hangul: 박신혜
- Hanja: 朴信惠
- RR: Bak Sinhye
- MR: Pak Sinhye
- Website: saltent.co.kr

Signature
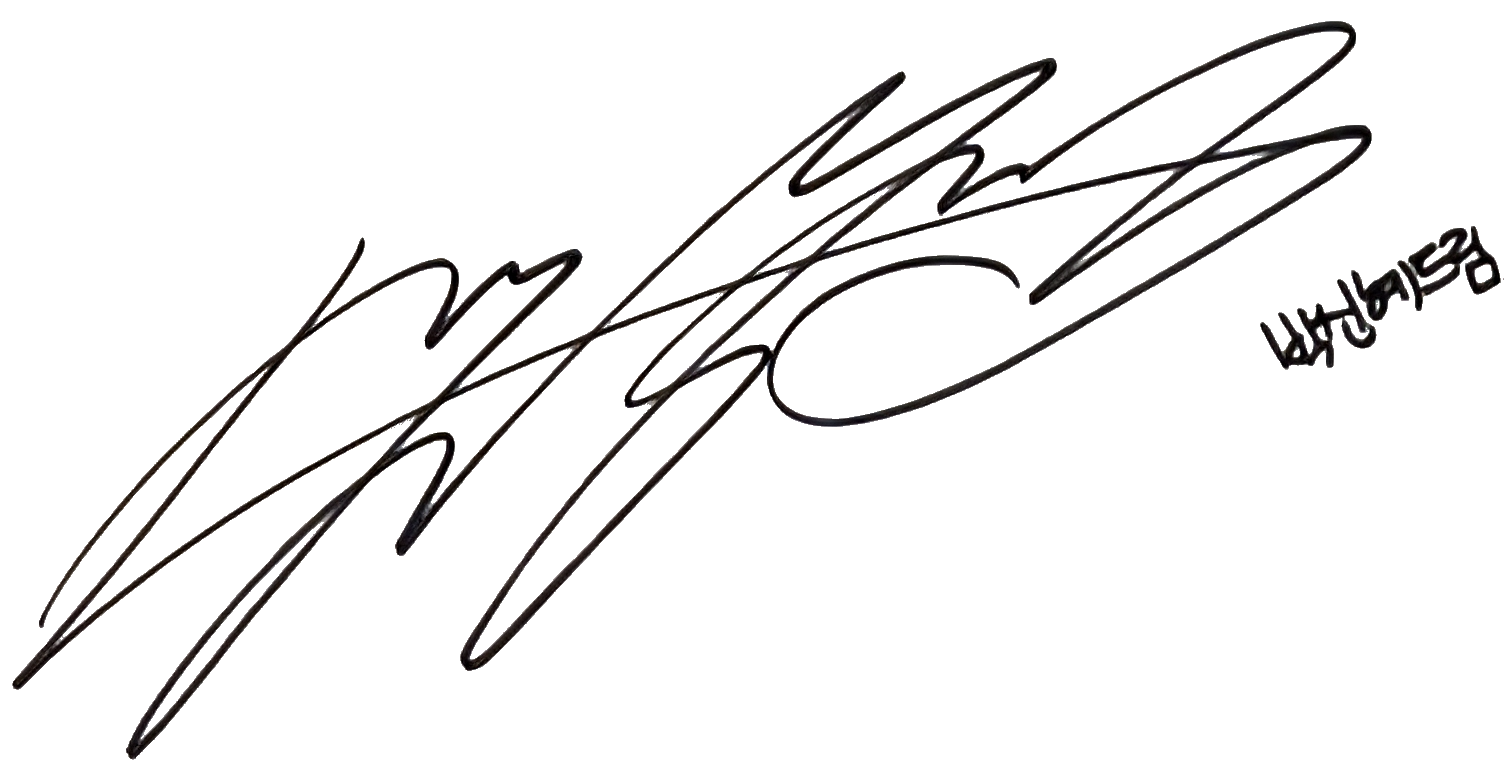

Park Shin-hye (Korean: 박신혜, born February 18, 1990) is a South Korean actress. She first gained recognition as a child actress in the television series Stairway to Heaven (2003) and Tree of Heaven (2006). In 2013, she starred in the film Miracle in Cell No. 7 which became one of the highest-grossing Korean films of all time. She then came to mainstream and international fame for television dramas You're Beautiful (2009), The Heirs (2013), Pinocchio (2014–2015), and Doctors (2016). This was followed with leading roles in Memories of the Alhambra (2018–2019), Doctor Slump (2024), The Judge from Hell (2024), and Undercover Miss Hong (2026).

Park has been included in the Forbes Korea Power Celebrity 40 list in 2015, 2017, 2021 and 2022. In addition to her acting career, Park is known for her philanthropy through her own charitable initiative, Starlight Angel Project.

== Early life and education ==
Park was born on February 18, 1990 in Gwangju, South Korea. She grew up in Songpa District, Seoul with an older brother. In 2001, Park auditioned for and later featured in singer Lee Seung-hwan music videos for "Do You Love Me!" and subsequently underwent formal training in singing, dancing, and acting at Lee’s agency, Dream Factory. While training, she featured in another of Lee's music videos, "Flower" (2003). (Note: Numerous sources conflict which year she was first active: most erroneously state 2003, whereas some correctly state 2001 (when she did appear in the music video for Lee Seung-hwan's single "...Do You Love Me!"). Also, another source (from JTBC Life) has a noticeable typo, '2013' instead of '2003'.)

After completing her education at Youngpa Girls' High School, Park studied at Chung-Ang University for eight years and received a degree in theater in February 2016. She was recognized with a service award for her accomplishments as a celebrity ambassador during the convocation ceremony.

== Career ==
=== 2003–2008: Beginnings ===
Park first gained recognition for her portrayal of the younger Choi Ji-woo's character in the popular Korean drama Stairway to Heaven in 2003. She continued to build her acting resume with supporting roles in various television series, most notably as a rebellious teenager in the 2004 drama special Very Merry Christmas.

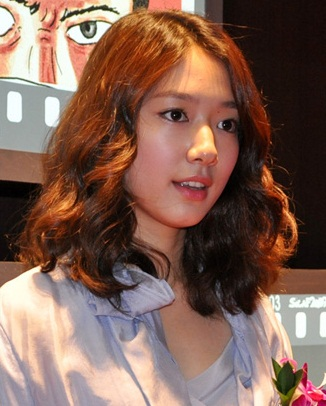
Park at Seoul International Cartoon and Animation Festival in 2008

In 2006, Park landed her first adult leading role in the South Korean-Japanese melodrama Tree of Heaven (2006). Her performance garnered critical acclaim and brought her wider recognition. The series was also aired in Japan, marking the beginning of her international recognition.

Park made her film debut in the 2007 horror film Evil Twin (2007), where she showcased her versatility by portraying dual roles: the protagonist and her deceased sister's ghost. She then ventured into antagonist territory with her role in the romantic comedy series Prince Hours, a spin-off of Princess Hours (2006). The same year, she appeared in the omnibus drama Several Questions That Make Us Happy. and the weekend drama Kimcheed Radish Cubes, where she played the role of Jang Sa-ya, a temple-raised character, for which she sacrificed her long locks.

Park's talents extend beyond acting. From 2006 to 2007, she co-hosted the variety program Fantastic Partner from, where she collaborated with singer Yoon Gun to compose a song titled "I Think of You". Her performance earned her the Best Newcomer in a Variety Show award at the MBC Entertainment Awards.

=== 2009–2012: Rising popularity ===
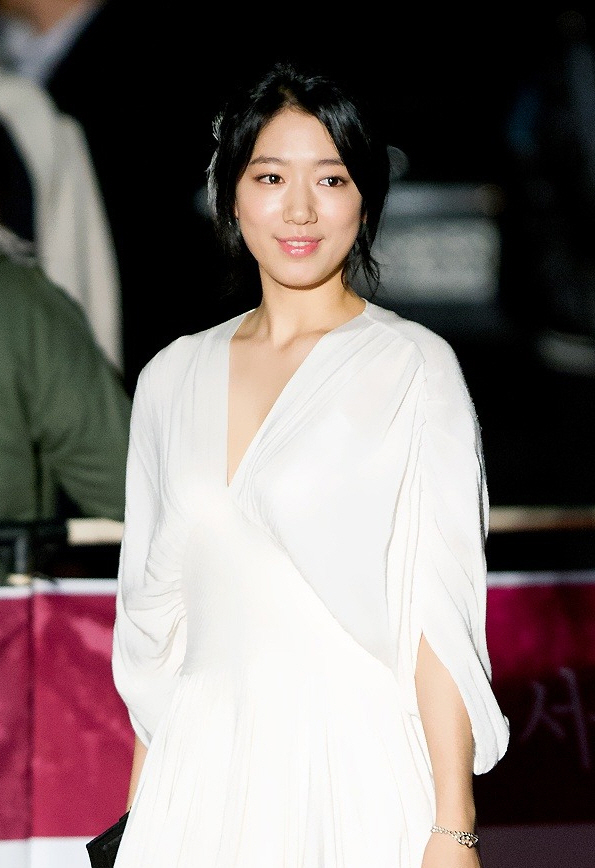
Park at the 2012 Seoul Music Awards

Park rose to fame after her portrayal as a cross-dressing heroine in the romance comedy music drama You're Beautiful (2009) alongside Jang Keun-suk. Despite average ratings in South Korea, the series gained a cult following and achieved high ratings in Japan. Park also contributed to the drama's original soundtrack with her songs "Lovely Day" and "Without Words".

In 2010, Park starred in the low-budget romantic comedy film Cyrano Agency, which centered around a dating agency helping clients win over their love interests. The sleeper hit proved to be both a critical and commercial success, attracting 2.7 million ticket sales nationwide and becoming the 8th best-selling film of the year. Park won the "Most Popular Actress" award in film category at the Baeksang Arts Awards. Park also voiced the main character of the animation film Green Days: Dinosaur and I, which premiered at the 15th Busan International Film Festival and received positive reviews.

Park then starred in MBC's youth melodrama Heartstrings (2011) opposite Jung Yong-hwa. The combined successes of You're Beautiful and Heartstrings raised Park's popularity in Japan, and in September 2011, she signed an exclusive contract with Japanese management agency IMX. The same year, Park starred in her first Taiwanese drama, Hayate The Combat Butler, which was based on the Japanese shōnen manga of the same name. In August 2011, she received the Popular Asian Star award at the LeTV Movie and Drama Awards.

In 2012, Park was cast in the third season of KBS Drama Special, Don't Worry, I'm a Ghost, which aired on July 15. Her performance in the drama won her the Best One-Act Special Actress Award at the 2012 KBS Drama Awards. Park was then cast in the third installment of tvN's "Flower Boy" series entitled My Cute Guys along with actor Yoon Shi-yoon, which premiered in January 2013. She played Go Dok-mi (in Korean, literally "lonely beauty"), a modern Rapunzel, who isolates herself in her "tower" to avoid the world. She also contributed to the drama's original soundtrack with her song "Pitch Black".

=== 2013–2022: Breakthrough and mainstream success ===
In 2013, Park appeared in the comedy-drama film Miracle in Cell No. 7, which became one of the highest-grossing films in Korea. She went on to win the Best Supporting Actress award at the 33rd Korean Association of Film Critics Awards. To celebrate her 10th anniversary as an actress, Park held the "2013 Park Shin Hye Asia Tour: Kiss Of Angel" in four Asian countries, becoming the first actress to hold a tour spanning Asia. She then starred in actor and singer So Ji-sub's music video "Eraser" for his album Two'clock... Playground, co-starring with former child actor Yoo Seung-ho.

The same year, Park co-starred with Lee Min-ho in The Heirs, a teen drama written by Kim Eun-sook. The Heirs enjoyed immense popularity both locally, with a peak rating of 28.6%, and internationally, having over one billion cumulative views on the Chinese streaming website iQiyi. Park experienced a surge in popularity domestically and internationally, and she became a Hallyu star. She was given the "Popular Foreign Actress" award at the 2013 Anhui TV Drama Awards.

In 2014, Park played the role of the Queen in the historical film The Royal Tailor. The same year, Park starred in Pinocchio opposite actor Lee Jong-suk. She portrayed the female lead, a reporter who suffers from a fictional medical condition called the "Pinocchio complex" which causes her to suffer from uncontrollable hiccups when she lies. Pinocchio became a hit, earning an estimated US$5.62 million for broadcasting rights in just one year. With The Heirs at the end of 2013 and Pinocchio in 2014, she was included in Forbes Korea's Korea Power Celebrity 40 list, where she placed 33rd. In the same year, MBC's Section TV Entertainment Relay dubbed her "Nation's Little Sister". Park also received the Prime Minister's Commendation at the Korea Popular Culture Awards for her contribution to the Korean Wave.

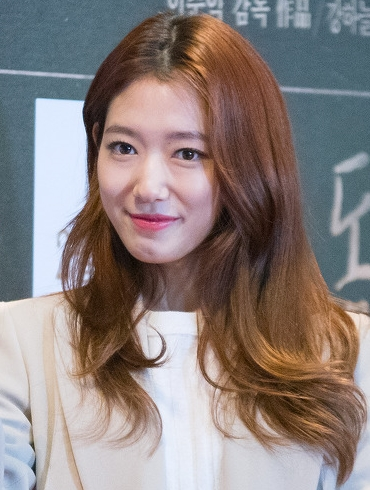
Park in 2016

In 2016, Park made her small-screen comeback in SBS's medical drama Doctors, where she played a troubled teenager who later becomes a successful doctor. The drama was a hit and topped viewership ratings and popularity charts during its 10-week broadcast. She then appeared in the comedy film My Annoying Brother as a judo coach alongside actor Jo Jung-suk and Do Kyung-soo of Exo. In the same year, Park was chosen as the Most Favored Korean Actress by fans of the Korean Wave in the United States.

Park next starred in the crime thriller film Heart Blackened, a Korean remake of the Hong Kong film Silent Witness, which was released in 2017. In 2018, Park became a cast member of the reality show Little Cabin in the Woods, produced by Na Young-seok, where she and fellow actor So Ji-sub documented their daily activities in a house located in Jeju Island. The same year, she starred in tvN's fantasy suspense drama Memories of the Alhambra, playing double roles as a hostel owner and a guitar-player NPC. The series was a commercial success and became one of the highest rated Korean dramas in cable television history.

In 2020, Park starred in the disaster film #Alive alongside Yoo Ah-in, which was based on a script written by Hollywood screenwriter Matt Naylor. The film was commercially successful, being the 7th highest grossing in South Korea for the year 2020. The same year, she starred in the Lee Chung-hyun-directed thriller film The Call which tells the story of two women living in different time periods but are connected through a mysterious phone call.

=== 2023–present: Established actress ===
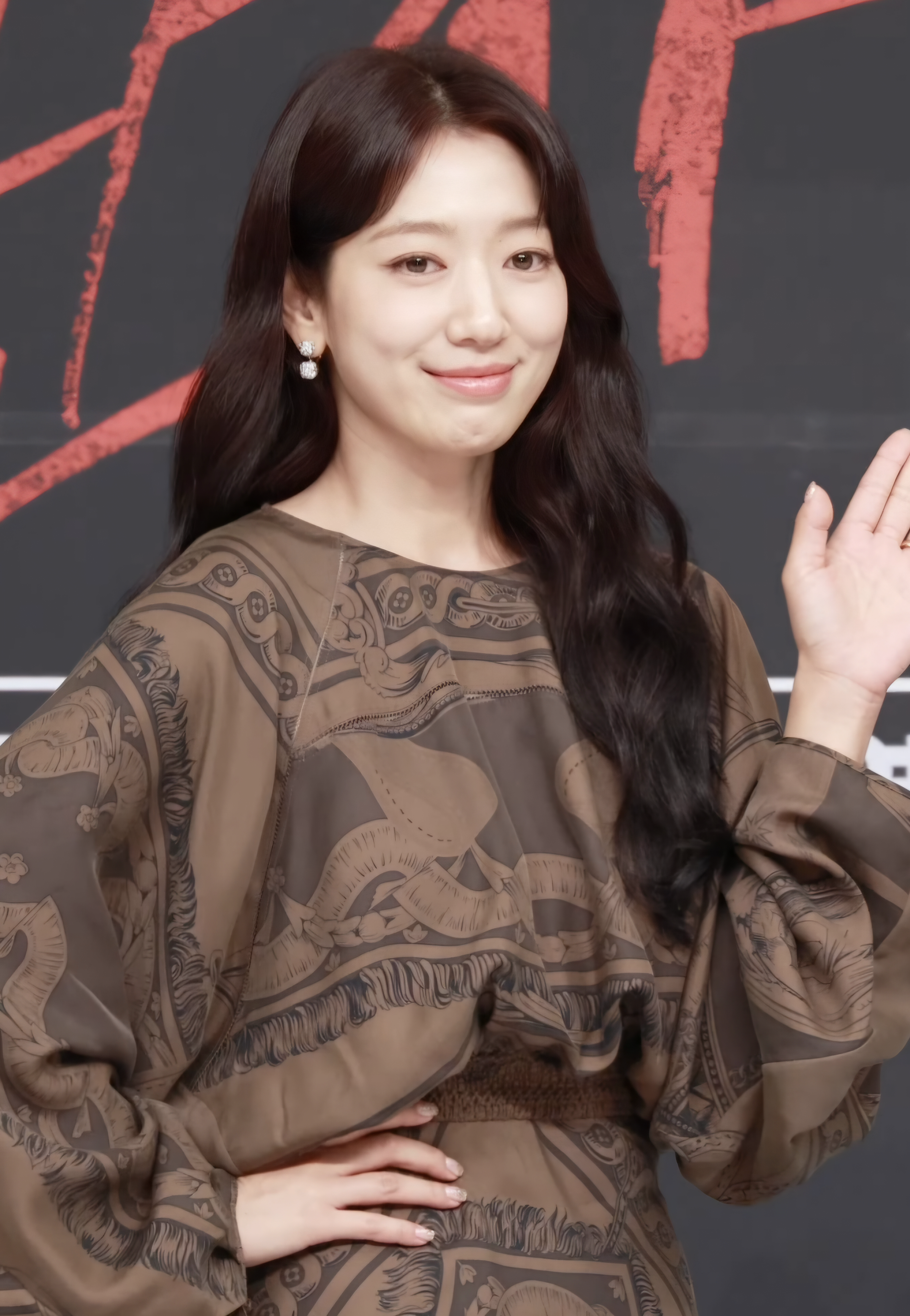
Park at The Judge from Hell press conference in 2024

In March 2023, Park along with Park Hyung-sik were confirmed as the main characters for the romantic-comedy medical drama Doctor Slump. This would be their first reunion since working together in The Heirs (2013). The drama is written by Baek Seon-woo and directed by Oh Hyun-jong, and revolves around once high school rivals who later meet again as doctors facing a slump. It aired on JTBC from January 27, to March 17, 2024, every Saturday and Sunday at 22:30 (KST). It is also available for streaming on TVING in South Korea, and on Netflix in selected regions.

In December 2023, Park and Kim Jae-young confirmed their appearances to lead the SBS TV drama The Judge from Hell directed by Park Jin-pyo. It premiered on September 21, 2024. The series is an action fantasy drama where the devil Justitia, who enters the body of a judge Kang Bit-na, meets the humane and passionate detective Han Da-on in a hellish reality and is reborn as a true judge by punishing criminals.

In July 2025, Park confirmed her appearance to play the lead role in the tvN drama Undercover Miss Hong helmed by Park Seon-ho and penned by Moon Hyun-kyung. She played Hong Geum-bo, a cold, career-focused elite inspector turned into a fresh-faced rookie to investigate suspicious fund movements at a securities firm. It premiered in January 2026.

== Other ventures ==
=== Ambassadorships ===
Year	Title	Organizer	Notes	Ref.
2009	PR Ambassador of Seoul International Cartoon and Animation Festival (SICAF)	Association Internationale du Film D' Animation (ASIFA) International	—N/a	
2010	PR Ambassador of 17th Jeonju Film Festival	Jeonju International Film Festival (JIFF)	with Song Joong-ki	
2011	PR Ambassador for 'Stop Hunger' campaign	Korea Food for the Hungry International (KFHI)	Year 2011–2014, with Yoon Shi-yoon, etc.	
2012	PR Ambassador of 49th Grand Bell Awards	Grand Bell Awards	with Joo Sang-wook	
2013	PR Ambassador for Anti-Counterfeit Good Campaign	Korea Intellectual Property Protection Association (KIPRA)	Year 2013–2014	
2014	Chung-Ang Ambassador	Chung-Ang University	with Kwon Yuri, Choi Sooyoung and Kim Soo-hyun	

=== Endorsements ===
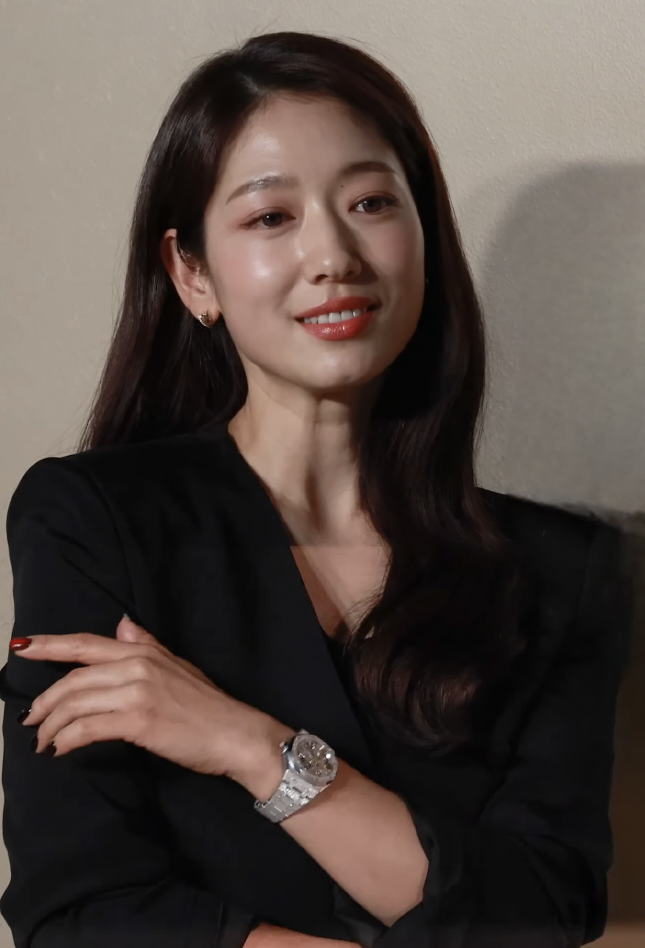
Park for Audemars Piguet in 2024

Park started her advertising career in 2004 as a model for the Pocari Sweat advertisement, known as the Gateway to Stardom. Subsequently, she appeared in campaigns for LG U+ "Aladdin Kids Phone Family Love Discount Plan," Hanbul cosmetics brand Sugar Ray, Ssamzie Korea's Ssamzie Sport, McDonald's China, and Case "Case Workbook" under a one-year contract.

In 2006, after gaining recognition for her acting in the drama Tree of Heaven, Park signed exclusive one-year model contracts with KTF's mobile communication service Bigi and Magic N Pym Multipack. She also appeared as a clothing model for Yeonsung Apparel's Clyde in 2006. In 2007, she signed a one-year contract with Nongshim's ramyeon Neoguri.

Her adorable depiction of sneaking a glance at her crush through donuts in SPC Group's Happy Point Card commercial went viral in 2008. In February 2009, Etude House announced their exclusive model contract with Park, which was signed in January. She worked as a model for Etude, featuring alongside her You're Beautiful co-star, Jang Keun-suk. Later, Etude paired her with Lee Min-ho. In the same year, she was paired with Kim Hyun-joong for a commercial for Coca-Cola's carbonated beverage Dynamic Kin. Additionally, she worked with CJ Foodville's VIPS and Korea Fujifilm's Instax Mini camera. In 2012, Park was chosen as the exclusive model for Gounsesang Cosmetics.

In 2013, following the success of Miracle in Cell No. 7 and tvN's My Cute Guys, Park became more popular. She appeared in Orion's Market O Valentine's Day commercial alongside Yoon Si-yoon, Kim Ji-hoon, and Ko Kyung-pyo from My Cute Guys. Park collaborated with various brands such as Sonobi, Jambaengi, Enprani Holika Holika, job search portal Job Sarangbang, The K Non-life Insurance Educar, and health drink Vegemil.

The success of the drama The Heirs further boosted Park's endorsement opportunities. In 2014, Park appeared in a commercial for local delivery app Yogiyo with her costar Kang Ha-neul. Park reunited with Jang Keun-suk in a Chinese beverage brand ad to celebrate the brand's 15th anniversary in 2014. She was the first Korean star to be selected as a model for Visa. Since the 2014 F/W season, Park served as the muse for the French jewellery brand Agatha Paris.

After her hit drama Pinocchio, Park endorsed several international brands including the Italian brand Bruno Magli and the French outdoor clothing brand Millet. After the success of the drama The Doctors, it has been reported that brands like Bruno Magli experienced a surge in sales as a result of Park's endorsements.

In 2017, Park made history as the first Korean to serve as a global ambassador of Swarovski. She was also selected as the Korean muse for Coach and Filipino clothing brand Bench. In 2018, Park was chosen as the exclusive model of bedding brand Allerman. In 2019, Park was chosen as first-ever brand ambassador for Korea by British jewellery brand Olivia Burton. Since 2019, she has been the muse for the clothing brand MOJO.S.PHINE. In 2021, she was chosen as the new model for the French original golf wear brand Castelbajac.

== Philanthropy ==
Park Shin-hye has been engaged in volunteering organized by the church with her family since she was a child, taking part in initiatives such as the "Babfor Sharing Movement" (Note: Babfor Sharing Movement (direct Korean translation is to scoop rice) started in 1988. In 1990 with the support of seven churches in the neighborhood, the Babsang Community came together and began to serve over 500 impoverished people per day. In 1994, the Dail Welfare Foundation was established.) and Habitat for Humanity. She expanded her philanthropic efforts after entering the entertainment industry through Starlight Angel Project.

In 2007, Park donated her talent for the omnibus drama Several Questions That Make Us Happy. The drama's proceeds, excluding production costs, were donated, including the fees of the writers, directors, and actors. The drama aimed to emphasize the significance of volunteering in a challenging social environment. It involved notable writers such as Noh Hee-kyung, Lee Sun-hee, and Seo Hee-jung, and was directed by Sung Joon-gi, with KBS producers Kim Yong-soo and Hong Seok-gu overseeing the project.

In late 2009, Park travelled to Tapatali village in Nepal, for a six-day visit. During her stay, Park distributed school supplies to children in need, helped break and carry stones for those working in the quarry, and dressed up as Santa Claus to give special Christmas gifts to the villagers. This volunteer experience was featured in the KBS Love Request year-end special broadcast 'Home Winter Love'.

In 2010, Park participated in CeCi magazine's "I Love Pet" campaign to celebrate the magazine's 16th anniversary. The campaign promoted adopting abandoned dogs through organizations like 'Animal Freedom Solidarity' and supported service animals through the 'Animal-assisted Therapy Welfare Association', which provides emotional therapy for disabled children with trained animals.

In 2011, Park became a public relations ambassador for "Korea Food for the Hungry International" (hereinafter referred to as KFHI). (Note: Korea Food for the Hungry International (KFHI) was established in 1989 as the first international relief and development non-governmental organization (NGO) registered in Korea, and the cumulative number of our sponsors is 606,485 (as of December 2020). With a Special Consultative Status of the United Nations Economic and Social Council (UN ECOSOC) KFHK trains and send more than 500 hope corps worldwide working as a change-agent to empower the most vulnerable and the hungry to be more resilient.) As part of her role, she volunteered in Ghana for 8 nights and 9 days in May. During her time there, Park delivered food kits to impoverished children, assisted children with malaria treatment, and spent quality time with a sponsored child named Avanna, taking care of her and sharing meals together. This KFHI's campaign was showcased in the television documentary "2011 MBC World Food Day Special - Stop the Hunger Sharing Campaign."

Park also participated in initiatives in response to the 2011 Tōhoku earthquake and tsunami. To celebrate the airing of the drama Heartstrings on Fuji TV Japan, Park and Jung Yong-hwa held a meet and greet event on July 15 and 16, 2012 at the Tokyo International Forum Hall. The event was attended by approximately 10,000 fans, and a portion of the proceeds was donated through KFHI for Tōhoku survivors. In August 2012, the non-profit organization "Good Friends Save Children" (GFSC) organized a fundraising event called "Hopes, Dreams, Happy Trip to Korea." The event invited 80 students and staff from Ogatsu Middle School in Ishinomaki, Miyagi Prefecture, representing the Tōhoku survivors. Park, Jung Yong-hwa and Lee Hong-gi appeared as surprise guests, providing words of encouragement and gifts.

In 2013, Park engaged in various initiatives. She donated rice wreaths received from fans to a charity organization during the Flower Boy Next Door production presentation. At the One Perfect Day film showcase event in April, She donated 520 kg of rice wreaths received from fans, which provided meals for 4,300 undernourished children. To create an inclusive version of the film for visually and hearing-impaired, Park also contributed her talents as a narrator in June.

Park marked her 10th-year debut anniversary by hosting "The 2013 Park Shin-hye Asia Tour: Kiss of Angel" in Philippines, Japan, and China. Funds raised from the events also went towards the Starlight Angel Village Project. The project established the first "Shin-hye's Center" in Ghana, comprising a school, library, and playground. It offered free kindergarten education and meals to local children. The initiative also involved building and repairing village wells, livestock donation, distributing mosquito nets, and providing prevention education. Completed in November 2013, the center benefited around 500 students.

After the final episode of The Heirs was filmed, Park and Lee Min-ho participated in a charity auction organized by Cheil on December 12. Park donated winter jackets and bags from the drama, while Lee donated three winter jackets. On December 18, Park visited Angels' Haven orphanage to give a lecture on intellectual property rights. She donated shoes and clothing from authentic brands, served a free lunch, and had a photo session with the children.

In response to the Sewol Ferry tragedy, Park made a secret donation of ₩50 million to the victims' families. The media later discovered this, and on April 25, S.A.L.T. Entertainment, donated ₩10 million. Both contributions were channeled through the Hope Bridge National Disaster Relief Association. Park also joined the Sewol Ferry tragedy's Yellow Ribbon Campaign.

This was followed by respective events in Osaka and Tokyo on July 19 and 20, featuring live performances and talk shows. Park visited five cities in China, starting from Shanghai on July 26, followed by Chongqing, Shenzhen, Changsha, and Beijing.

Park and S.A.L.T. Entertainment were also involved in charity initiatives, including the "Lovely Hands campaign" organized by Lotte Department Store to raise funds for children with rare diseases at Korea University Anam Hospital. Lotte Department Store donated ₩1,000 for each participant during the campaign, which took place from March 27 to April 12. In May, Park donated ₩30 million ($28,000) to support the victims of the April 2015 Nepal earthquake, while S.A.L.T. Entertainment also contributed ₩10 million. Both donations were made through KFHI.

In 2016, Park initiated the planning for the second Shin-hye's Centre in Sampaloc, Manila, Philippines. Like the first one in Ghana, the centre is designed to function as a cultural center for the local community, emphasizing educational and nutritional assistance for children. In March, Park with S.A.L.T. Entertainment employees, visited existing Sampaloc Children's Center. They formed personal connections with approximately 150 sponsored children with fun activities of dyeing white T-shirts, lunch gathering and home visits. In July 2016, Park initiated Shin-hye's Centre groundbreaking ceremony, with completion set for October the following year.

On November 24, 2016, Park Shin-hye and Lee Eun-young of S.A.L.T. Entertainment, were honored as the 36th and 37th members of the Philanthropic Club of KFHI. Membership in the club is granted to donors who have contributed a minimum of ₩100 million (US$85,000) or more to the organization. On November 30, Park donated ₩50 million (US$42,881) to the Hope Bridge National Disaster Relief Association (Note: Hope Bridge Korea Disaster Relief Association is a civil association established in 1961 by broadcasting companies,newspaper companies, and social organizations to help our neighbors who are suffering from unexpected disasters.) to support victims of the fire in District 4 of Seomun Market in Daegu. Park also donated ₩50 million to the association's Community Coal Bank, purchasing 83,340 "briquettes of love" that provided warmth to 556 families for a month.

In November 2017, Salt Entertainment announced the completion of two major projects: the "Philippine Shinhye Center" (constructed between July 2016 and September 2017) and the "Hwado Happy Home School Renovation Support Project" for a local children's center in Namyangju, Gyeonggi-do (initiated in March 2017).

In November, Park also donated ₩50 million through KFHI to assist victims of the 2017 Pohang earthquake. On December 10, Park Shin-hye organized a charity event in Seoul called "Park Shin-hye's Starlight Angel Project 2017: Kimchi Sharing of Love." Around 60 people attended, including KFHI representatives, employees, and members of her fan club, 'Starlight Angel.' Together, they prepared kimchi and distributed it to approximately 200 families with children affected by the Pohang earthquake.

Park joined the "Star Relay Heart Challenge" to help children from low-income families. She interacted with fans through live broadcasts on May 18, 2018, completing missions like making cards for children. Donations to KFHI were based on the number of "hearts" received, with a maximum contribution of three million won ($2,775). On December 20, 2018, Park donated 20 washing machines, valued at around ₩50 million, designed for fire-retardant clothing to show gratitude for firefighters' dedication. LG Electronics pledged to provide a dryer for each washing machine to match her donation.

On April 24, 2019, Park was honored with the Special Philanthropy Celebrity of the Year Award at the 5th Asia Philanthropy Awards (APA) ceremony. Though she was unable to attend the event due to prior overseas commitments, the award was accepted on her behalf by Kim Kyung-sook, director of the KFHI.

In April, Park donated ₩30 million to the Hope Bridge National Disaster Relief Association to help victims of forest fires in Goseong and Sokcho, Gangwon Province. Later in the year, in November, she contributed an additional ₩30 million to the organization's Community Coal Bank initiative.

In August 2019, Park visited Kenya and Botswana for 15 days, where she assisted activists of Elephants Without Borders (Note: Elephant Without Borders is a non-profit, tax-exempt, registered organization in the Republic of Botswana dedicated to conserving wildlife and natural resources. EWB is based in Kazungula, Botswana's border town where the boundaries of Botswana, Namibia, Zambia and Zimbabwe meet along the Zambezi River.) in caring for orphaned elephants and attaching GPS devices to wild elephants. Her experience was featured in the MBC documentary "Humanimal Part 1 - Killing an Elephant," which aired in January 2020. Park's appearance fee for the documentary was donated to the foundation.

In March 2020, Park donated ₩50 million to the Hope Bridge Korea Disaster Relief Association's fund for preventing the spread of COVID-19. In August, she donated ₩100 million to support the victims of heavy rains and landslides through the same organization. In October of that year, Park donated around ₩50 million to the Starlight School program, an initiative by KFHI to protect children at night. The program is part of the Happy Home School movement, which aims to ensure the safety and well-being of children in challenging environments. In December, Park donated approximately ₩20 million ($18,100) through KFHI on behalf of the Starlight Angel Project. The donation provided 90,000 sanitary pads to 500 children from low-income families in 62 regional centers in South Korea, ensuring a 5-month supply. Yuhan Kimberly, a brand endorsed by Park, also contributed an extra 57,000 sanitary pads.

In March 2022, Park donated ₩50 million to the Hope Bridge Disaster Relief Association to help those damaged by large forest fires in Uljin, North Gyeongsang Province and Samcheok, Gangwon.

In July 2023, Park donated ₩100 million worth of 2,000 summer blankets to the flood victims affected by torrential rain. The blankets were distributed through The Korean Red Cross branches in Sejong, North Chungcheong, South Chungcheong, and North Gyeongsang Province regions.

== Personal life ==
Park comes from a family with a Christian background. Her parents are devout Christians, and their faith has been passed down through five generations. She used her savings to open a barbecue restaurant for her parents. She has an older brother named Park Shin-won, who worked as a guitarist and composer.

On March 7, 2018, Park confirmed that she had been dating fellow actor Choi Tae-joon since late 2017. She announced their engagement on November 23, 2021, while also expecting a baby and planning their wedding. They married on January 22, 2022, in a church ceremony, followed by a reception in Seoul. Park and Choi welcomed their first child, a son, on May 31, 2022. In April 2026, it was announced that the couple was expecting their second child. Park gave birth to a daughter on September 22, 2026.

== Discography ==
=== Singles ===
Title	Year	Peak chart positions	Sales (Digital)	Album
Title	Year	KOR	Sales (Digital)	Album
"Arm Pillow" (팔베개)	2014	49	KOR: 33,918	Non-album singles
"My Dear" feat. Yong Jun-hyung	2014	—	KOR: 16,835	Non-album singles
"—" denotes release did not chart.

=== Soundtrack appearances ===
Title	Year	Peak chart positions	Sales (Digital)	Album
Title	Year	KOR	Sales (Digital)	Album
"Without a Word" (말도 없이)	2009	—		You're Beautiful OST
"Lovely Day"	2009	—		You're Beautiful OST
"It Was You" (당신이었군요) with Lee Min-jung	2010	—		Cyrano Agency OST
"In Space" (우주에서) with Song Chang-eui	2011	—		Green Days: Dinosaur and I OST
"The Day We Fall in Love" (사랑하게 되는 날)	2011	—		Heartstrings OST
"Memories Are Sadder Than Love" (기억이란 사랑보다)	2012	—		Don't Worry, I'm a Ghost OST
"Pitch Black" (새까맣게)	2013	75	KOR: 31,651	My Cute Guys OST
"Story"	2013	47	KOR: 101,041	The Heirs OST
"Love is Like Snow" (사랑은 눈처럼)	2014	—		Pinocchio OST
"Dreaming a Dream" (꿈을 꾸다)	2014	—		Pinocchio OST
"—" denotes release did not chart.
