= Green Days: Dinosaur and I =

- Theatrical poster
- Hangul: 소중한 날의 꿈
- RR: Sojunghan narui kkum
- MR: Sojunghan narŭi kkum
- Directed by: Ahn Jae-hoon; Han Hye-jin
- Written by: Song Hye-jin
- Produced by: Lee Byung-gyu; Lee Sang-wook
- Starring: Park Shin-hye; Song Chang-eui; Oh Yeon-seo
- Cinematography: Lee Young-woong
- Music by: Lee Ji-yeon
- Production company: Meditations with a Pencil
- Distributed by: A1 Entertainment
- Release date: June 23, 2011
- Running time: 98 minutes
- Country: South Korea
- Language: Korean

Green Days: Dinosaur and I (Korean: 소중한 날의 꿈; lit. 'Dream of a Precious Day') is a 2011 South Korean animated film. Without the high-tech computer graphics and three-dimensional techniques that dominate the animation industry, the film was hand-drawn in pencil, with 14 animators using 100,000-plus sheets over a period of 11 years. It premiered at the 15th Busan International Film Festival in 2010 and competed for the top prize at the 2011 Annecy International Animated Film Festival.

Set in a 1970s rural town, Green Days: Dinosaur and I is a nostalgic coming-of-age story about a high school girl who struggles to find meaning in her existence and learns to confront her biggest fears, while also falling in love for the first time. Yi-rang (voiced by Park Shin-hye) has all but given up on her athletic aspirations, when she meets Cheol-soo (Song Chang-eui), who dreams of becoming an astronaut, and Soo-min (Oh Yeon-seo), a transfer student from Seoul. The film follows the adolescents' budding romance, growing pains, hopes and dreams.

== Plot ==
Yi-rang is in a race and falls behind. To save herself from shame, she fakes a fall. After that competition, she resolves to never compete again. A new transfer student from Seoul comes to school. Her name is Soo-min and all the boys fall for her as she is very pretty.

Yi-rang exits the movie theater to the restroom after the movie is over. She sobs in front of the mirror and then wipes her tears as Soo-min comes out of a stall. Yi-rang meets Soo-min again at a record shop.

A former track teammate of Yi-rang tries to persuade her to return to the track team. Yi-rang refuses. Meanwhile, a boy, Cheol-soo, is in a makeshift hang glider and his friends tries to warn him against flying.

Yi-rang's radio breaks and she takes it to the repair shop. She meets a boy from her school. Yi-Rang mistakes his name for Charles, which is his nickname. His name is Cheol-soo and he hopes to become an astronaut. He has an uncle who owns the repair shop. Yi-rang's radio is fixed but it starts raining. She takes an umbrella and forgets her radio at the shop.

Cheol-soo and Yi-rang go on a trip to see a dinosaur footprint. Once back home, Yi-rang races in the marathon.

== Cast and characters ==
- Park Shin-hye as Oh Yi-rang - A girl who loves running. She quits the track team.
- Song Chang-eui as Kim Cheol-soo - A boy who dreams of becoming an astronaut. He is skilled with his hands.
- Oh Yeon-seo as Han Soo-min - A transfer student from Seoul. She becomes friends with Yi-rang.
- Uhm Sang-hyun as Uncle
- Jeon Hye-young as Min-jeong
- Seo Joo-ae as Go Kyeong-ah
- Kim Gook-bin
- Jeong Mi-suk as Pilot

== Reception ==
Despite positive reviews from critics and invitations to 10 film festivals all over the world, Green Days: Dinosaur and I was a box office failure domestically, with 51,879 admissions. Co-director Ahn Jae-hoon attributed this to the film's limited release, since bigger, commercial films monopolized theater screens.

Co-director Han Hye-jin won Best Director/Screenwriter at the 2011 Women in Film Korea Awards.
