= Heartstrings (South Korean TV series) =

2011 South Korean television series

- Promotional poster
- Genre: Romance; Melodrama; Musical
- Written by: Lee Myung-sook
- Directed by: Pyo Min-soo
- Starring: Park Shin-hye; Jung Yong-hwa
- Ending theme: "You've Fallen for Me" by Jung Yong-hwa
- Country of origin: South Korea
- Original language: Korean
- No. of episodes: 15 (+1 special)

Production
- Executive producer: Choi Hong-mi
- Producers: Lee Jin-seok; Kim Yang
- Running time: 70 minutes
- Production company: JS Pictures

Original release
- Network: MBC TV
- Release: June 29 – August 19, 2011

Heartstrings (Korean: 넌 내게 반했어; RR: Neon naege banhaesseo; lit. 'You've Fallen for Me') is a 2011 South Korean television series starring Park Shin-hye and Jung Yong-hwa. It aired on MBC from June 29 to August 19, 2011, on Wednesdays and Thursdays at 21:55 (KST) for 15 episodes.

Heartstrings is a youth melodrama about love, friendship and dreams, set against the backdrop of a performing arts college. The drama reunited Jung Yong-hwa and Park Shin-hye, who both starred in the TV series You're Beautiful (2009).

== Synopsis ==
A series of misunderstandings causes Lee Shin (Jung Yong-hwa), the cocky leader of "The Stupid" and Lee Gyu-won (Park Shin-hye), a college student majoring in Traditional Korean Music, to start on the wrong foot. Gyu-won does not understand why Lee Shin is so popular, until one day she is forced to go the band's concert with her friends, who are fans of The Stupid. There, she sees Lee Shin performing live, and is immediately captivated by him.

When Gyu-won decides to join the performance group for the upcoming 100th anniversary performance for the university, everyone sees her potential and talent, particularly Kim Suk-hyun (Song Chang-eui), a Broadway composer-turned-music director. She competes with Han Hee-joo (Kim Yoon-hye), the spoiled daughter of the university chairman, for the role of the leading actress (but loses to her, as Hee-joo had previously bribed the judges). Lee Shin also decides to join the musical due to his crush on the dance professor, Jung Yoon-soo (So Yi-hyun), who is also the choreographer and muse of the musical. As Gyu-won and Lee Shin spend more time together, they begin to fall for each other.

Fearing that Gyu-won might outshine her daughter, Hee-joo's mother schemes with Im Tae-joon (Lee Jung-heon), one of the school's administrators; they plot to destroy Gyu-won's image to force her to quit the performance. Lee Shin works with Suk-hyun in order to clear Gyu-won's name. Meanwhile, Joon-hee (Kang Min-hyuk) struggles between his ever-growing feelings for Hee-joo, and helping his friends as she threatens their university lives.

When Hee-joo is found to be suffering from a vocal chord infection, Gyu-won is given the chance to replace her and go on stage. However, the kind-hearted Gyu-won chooses to let Hee-joo stand on stage instead, while she sings for her backstage. When the media finds out that Gyu-won is the actual singer, she is offered a chance to go overseas to record an album. A new conflict occurs as Gyu-won is made to choose between her dreams and love. At the same time, Lee Shin is hurting from a broken wrist that was caused by a fall he suffered with Gyu-won. Worried that she might forfeit her dreams to stay with him, he lies to her and insists that he is fine, even after crouching in pain during a performance with The Stupid. Gyu-won eventually decides to go to the United Kingdom to fulfill her dreams, while Lee Shin undergoes surgery to fix his broken wrist.

== Cast ==
=== Main ===
- Park Shin-hye as Lee Gyu-won

A student majoring in Traditional Korean Music, born to a prestigious musical family. She later discovers her passion for musicals and fights to realize her dreams.

- Jung Yong-hwa as Lee Shin

Lead singer and guitarist of "The Stupid", known for his good looks and musical talent. Perceived as cold and distant, Lee Shin harbors a soft side within him. He initially has a crush on Yoon-soo, but later falls for Gyu-won.

- Song Chang-eui as Kim Suk-hyun

A famous theatre director who earned accolades for successfully producing original musicals on Broadway. He acts as a mentor to the aspiring students.

- So Yi-hyun as Jung Yoon-soo

A professional ballerina and choreographer. She was in a relationship with Suk-hyun, but broke up with him to further her studies at New York.

=== Supporting ===
==== Students ====
- Kang Min-hyuk as Yeo Joon-hee

Drummer of "The Stupid". A sexy but innocent man who is always hungry. He falls in love with Hee-joo at first sight, and calls her "Natasha".

- Kim Yoon-hye^{1} as Han Hee-joo

The chairman's daughter. An arrogant and spoiled woman who has a crush on Lee Shin. She sees Gyu-won as her rival, and attempts to sabotage her multiple times.

- Lee Hyun-jin as Hyun Ki-young

A talented singer who suffers from stage fright, but later overcomes it with encouragement from Suk-hyun.

- Im Se-mi as Cha Bo-woon

Gyu-won's close friend, and fellow member of "The Windflowers".

- Jang Seo-won as Lee Soo-myung
- Lim Do-yoon as Sa-rang
- Oh Won-bin as guitarist of "The Stupid"
- Song Se-hyun as bassist of "The Stupid"

==== Family members ====
- Shin Goo as Lee Dong-jin

Gyu-won's grandfather. A strict and traditional man. He is a famous pansori master, and one of the top 3 traditional musicians of his age. His biggest wish is to see his granddaughter become a traditional music prodigy.

- Seo Beom-seok as Lee Hyun-soo

Lee Shin's father. A famous guitarist who later dies from alcohol poisoning. He was Sun-ki's best friend, and stole Ji-young away from him.

- Lee Il-hwa as Song Ji-young

Lee Shin's mother. She was the singer of a band and first love of Lee Sun-ki, but their relationship was opposed by Lee Dong-jin.

- Sunwoo Jae-duk as Lee Sun-ki

Gyu-won's father, who was banished from the family by Lee Dong-jin due to his love of classical piano.

- Moon Ga-young as Lee Jung-hyun

Lee Shin's younger sister. A spoiled brat who often extorts money from Lee Shin and Gyu-won. She is later shown to develop an interest for pansori, which delights Lee Dong-jin.

==== Others ====
- Lee Jung-heon as Im Tae-joon

Department head. He has a crush on Yoon-soo, and favors Hee-joo due to her being the chairman's daughter.

- Jung Kyung-ho as Goo Jung-eun

The owner of Catharsis, also known as Madam Gu.

- Kim Sun-kyung as Professor Hong
- Gi Ju-bong as University chairman

== Title ==
The series initially had the working title Festival (페스티벌), until broadcaster MBC announced an online contest held from March 30 to April 10, 2011 to give it a new title. Among over 4,000 suggestions submitted to the MBC website, You've Fallen for Me (넌 내게 반했어) was chosen as the Korean title. A second online contest for the international English title was held on the digital American distribution platform DramaFever, and Heartstrings won the fan poll.

== Soundtrack ==
The Heartstrings soundtrack was released in four installments every week starting from June 29, 2011, and concluding on July 20, 2011.

Part 1
No.	Title	Artist	Length
1.	"넌 내게 반했어" (Neon Naege Banhaesseo (You've Fallen for Me))	Jung Yong-hwa	3:11
2.	"사랑하게 되는 날" (Saranghage Doeneun Nal (The Day We Fall in Love))	Park Shin-hye	3:22

Part 2
No.	Title	Artist	Length
1.	"별" (Byeol (Star))	Kang Min-hyuk	3:12

Part 3
No.	Title	Artist	Length
1.	"그리워서..." (Geuriwoseo... (Because I Miss You...))	Jung Yong-hwa	4:35
2.	"어떻게 하면 좋을까요" (Eotteohke Hamyeon Joheulkkayo (What Do You Want Me to Do))	Various Artists	2:20
3.	"그대를 만나러 갑니다" (Geudaereul Mannareo Gabnida (Going to Meet Me))	Various Artists	2:01
4.	"그리워서... (Inst.)" (Because I Miss You... (Inst.))	Various Artists	4:35
5.	"넌 내게 반했어 (Inst.)" (You've Fallen for Me (Inst.))	Various Artists	3:11
6.	"그리워서... (Guitar Ver.)" (Because I Miss You... (Guitar Ver.))	Various Artists	1:55
7.	"싸울 준비 되었나요" (Ssaul Junbi Doeeotnayo (Are You Ready to Fight?))	Various Artists	1:52

Part 4
No.	Title	Artist	Length
1.	"모르나봐" (Moreunabwa (I Don't Know))	M Signal	5:04
2.	"꼭은 아니더라도" (Kkogeun Anideorado (Even If It's Not Necessary))	F.T. Island	4:25

Special
No.	Title	Artist	Length
1.	"모르나봐" (Moreunabwa (I Don't Know))	M Signal	5:06
2.	"그래 웃어봐" (Geurae Useobwa (Give Me a Smile))	M Signal	3:38
3.	"친구로만 알았는데" (Chinguroman Ar-atneunde (Thought We Were Only Friends))	Oh Won-bin	3:57
4.	"꼭은 아니더라도" (Kkogeun Anideorado (Even If It's Not Necessary))	F.T. Island	4:25
5.	"그리워서... (Band Ver.)" (Because I Miss You... (Band Ver.))	Jung Yong-hwa	3:05
6.	"모르나봐 (Inst.)" (I Don't Know (Inst.))	M Signal	5:06
7.	"그래 웃어봐 (Fusion Ver.)" (Give Me a Smile (Fusion Ver.))	M Signal	3:42
8.	"The Battle of Life"	Various Artists	2:14
9.	"비제를 위하여" (Bijereul Wihayeo)	Various Artists	2:00
10.	"슬픈 사생결단" (Seulpeun Sasaeng-gyeoldan (Sorrowful Decision))	Various Artists	1:30

== Ratings ==
Date	Episode	Title	TNmS Nationwide	AGB Nationwide
2011-06-29	01	An Unexpected Meeting With You	6.7%	7.6%
2011-06-30	02	That Is My World	4.9%	6.8%
2011-07-06	03	Champion	5.3%	6.6%
2011-07-07	04	Towards Tomorrow	5.4%	6.6%
2011-07-13	05	Confession	5.4%	6.2%
2011-07-14	06	With The Thought That It Must Be Forgotten	4.5%	5.6%
2011-07-20	07	Like This... Will Be Forgotten	5.7%	5.7%
2011-07-21	Special	Accidentally Meeting You	4.1%	5.1%
2011-07-27	08	My Love, Cry Baby	5.9%	6.5%
2011-07-28	09	High Speed Romance	5.4%	5.0%
2011-08-03	10	Little By Little, Slowly Stepping Towards You	7.1%	7.3%
2011-08-04	11	That Place, That Time	6.7%	6.4%
2011-08-10	12	Don't Cry	5.4%	5.9%
2011-08-11	13	Emergency	6.2%	6.1%
2011-08-17	14	So Smile	5.3%	6.7%
2011-08-18	15	Let Your Dreams Soar	5.6%	6.0%
Average			5.7%	6.3%

== Awards and nominations ==
Year	Award	Category	Recipient	Result
2011	MBC Drama Awards	Best New Actor in a Miniseries	Jung Yong-hwa	Nominated
2012	Baeksang Arts Awards	Most Popular Actress (TV)	Park Shin-hye	Won
2012	K-Drama Star Awards	Hallyu Star Award	Jung Yong-hwa	Won
2013	Asian Television Awards	Best Single Drama	Heartstrings	Won

== Notes ==
- ^{1}Credited as Woori.
