= Evil Twin (film) =

- Theatrical poster
- Hangul: 전설의 고향
- Hanja: 傳說의 故鄕
- RR: Jeonseorui gohyang
- MR: Chŏnsŏrŭi kohyang
- Directed by: Kim Ji-hwan
- Written by: Ahn Min-jeong; Kim Ji-hwan
- Produced by: Lee Kang-min
- Starring: Park Shin-hye; Jae Hee
- Cinematography: Son Won-ho
- Edited by: Kim Hyung-joo; Kim Mi-young
- Music by: Kim Jun-seong
- Distributed by: Prime Entertainment
- Release date: May 23, 2007
- Running time: 95 minutes
- Country: South Korea
- Language: Korean
- Box office: $2,396,341

Evil Twin (Korean: 전설의 고향; RR: Jeonseorui gohyang) is a 2007 South Korean horror film. When an accident claims the life of a young girl, during the same incident her twin sister fell into a coma and awakens 10 years later. Many deaths follows her recovery, and she seemingly takes on her sister's personality traits.

== Plot ==
The movie begins with a young woman being strangled by a man. The man strangling her is accusing her of murder. A series of flashbacks show two little girls playing on a bridge and falling into the water.

Three men are sitting and drinking, asking each other what they would do if they saw a ghost. Two of the men make fun of the third about his stuttering and cowardice. The stutterer says that they would be scared too if they met dead Hyo-jin. The third man makes an excuse and leaves. While walking home, he glances nervously at a bridge and pretends not to see it. He then sees a woman with long hair covering her face. Frightened, he attempts to pretend he doesn't see her either but the woman appears in front of him.

A young woman, So-yeon, wakes up from a creepy dream in the hospital, finding her mother beside her. The doctor informs them that she has lost her memories. So-yeon is taken home and pampered, tended to by a servant who tells her that she has been in a coma for ten years. So-yeon has a vision of drowning and develops chest pains after overhearing of a man drowned in a ditch. She goes directly to where the body was, arousing the curiosity of her servants. Far in the distance, she sees the body being carried away: the stuttering man from earlier.

The servants in the kitchen talk about So-yeon's twin sister Hyo-jin. When they were young, both girls fell off a bridge into the water. Hyo-jin drowned, while So-yeon went into a coma. Hyo-jin, was said to be her father's favorite while their mother had always favored the eldest, So-yeon. So-yeon was said to have been a nasty child and often bullied Hyo-jin.

Hearing about So-yeon's recovery, Hyun Sik, So-yeon's fiancé, is ordered by his mother to visit her. He is reluctant to see her as he was in love with Hyo-jin and was devastated by her death. Hyun Sik meets So-yeon, and she mentions that she remembers playing with him when they were kids. Hyun Sik also remembers that day. He was happily playing with Hyo-jin but So-yeon found them, becomes jealous and hit Hyo-jin, resulting in a scar. Angry at the memory, Hyun Sik walks away.

After a series of mysterious killings, it is revealed that the one killed in the water ten years ago was not Hyo-jin but So-yeon: the living twin is actually Hyo-jin. The secret was hidden by her mother, who had been telling the villagers that Hyo-jin was dead and the one alive was So-yeon, since she was her favorite. But the dreadful spirit of the real So-Yeon came back to take revenge. Facing the spirit of the real So-yeon, Hyo-jin and their mother run to the bridge, and Hyo-jin falls into the lake. The mother tries to save her, but she grabs the hand of So-yeon, and, finally seeing Hyo-jin, also grabs Hyo-jin's. Both beg their mother to save them. Hyo-jin tells her mother that she is okay, and the mother lets go of Hyo-jin's hand. The mother then falls into the lake to embrace So-yeon's spirit who is finally comforted and persuaded to let go of her vengeance against Hyo-jin; the mother apologizes for being late as she and So-yeon sink to the bottom of the lake together. Hyun Sik runs to the bridge, presumably saving Hyo-jin. The film ends with Hyun Sik and Hyo-jin, probably married to each other, on the bridge.

== Cast ==
- Park Shin-hye as So-yeon/Hyo-jin
- Jae Hee as Hyun-sik
- Yang Geum-seok as So-yeon's mother
- Park Myeong-sin
- Yang Jin-woo
- Han Yeo-woon
- Bae Yoon-beom
- Jung Sang-hoon
- Bang Eun-mi
- Choi Soo-han
