= The Judge from Hell =

2024 South Korean television series

- Promotional poster
- Hangul: 지옥에서 온 판사
- Hanja: 地獄에서 온 判事
- RR: Jiogeseo on pansa
- MR: Chiogesŏ on p'ansa
- Genre: Dark fantasy; Action; Legal thriller
- Written by: Jo Yi-soo
- Directed by: Park Jin-pyo
- Starring: Park Shin-hye; Kim Jae-young
- Music by: Jeon Chang-yeop
- Opening theme: "Gehenna" by: Jeon Chang-yeop; Kim Hyun-joon
- Ending theme: "Boomerang" by Jessi
- Country of origin: South Korea
- Original language: Korean
- No. of episodes: 14

Production
- Executive producer: Lee Ok-gyu
- Producers: Yoon Yoon-sun; Kwon Ryeong-ah; Park Mi-kyung; Hong Sung-chang
- Cinematography: Park Sung-yong
- Editors: Kim Ha-na; Kim Woo-hyun
- Running time: 60–73 minutes
- Production company: Studio S

Original release
- Network: SBS TV
- Release: September 21, 2024 – present

The Judge from Hell (Korean: 지옥에서 온 판사) is a 2024 South Korean television series written by Jo Yi-soo, directed by Park Jin-pyo, and starring Park Shin-hye and Kim Jae-young. It aired on SBS TV from September 21, to November 2, 2024, every Friday and Saturday at 22:00 (KST). It is also available for streaming on Disney+ in selected regions. On June 1, 2026, the second season was announced.

== Synopsis ==
Justitia, a merciless demon judge from Hell, is exiled to Earth after wrongly condemning the innocent Judge Kang Bit-na to eternal punishment. As part of her penance, Justitia is placed in Bit-na's body, now tasked with living as a judge in the human world for a year while fulfilling a far darker mission: to track down and condemn ten ruthless individuals responsible for the deaths of others, all without a trace of remorse.

With no interest in the lives around her, Justitia's only focus is to carry out her mission and send these souls to Hell, knowing failure means her own demise.

Soon, she encounters Han Da-on, a sharp-witted detective of Violent Crimes Unit 2 at Nobong Police Station, who's known for his meticulous approach to justice. Unaware of Bit-na's true identity, he begins to investigate the strange cases connected to her judgments, and his own painful past gradually coming to light.

== Cast and characters ==
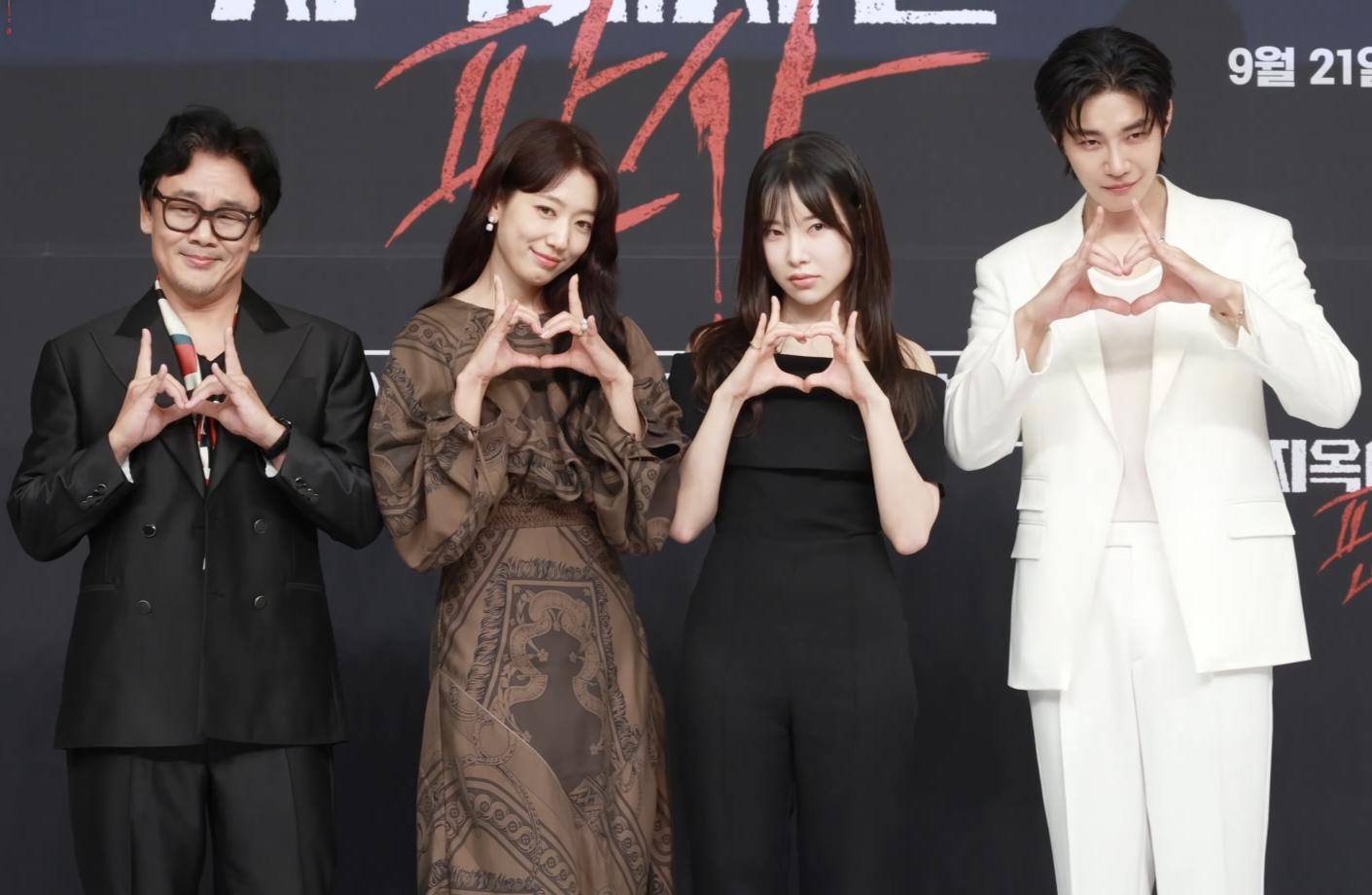
The Judge from Hell cast at the press conference on September 19, 2024

=== Main ===
- Park Shin-hye as Kang Bit-na

A judge of the 18th Criminal Division at Seoul Central District Court who was murdered. Her body is later possessed by a demon named Justitia, who came from Hell to complete her mission of killing and sending 10 criminals (now 20) to hell in a span of one year.

- Kim Jae-young as Han Da-on

A kindly detective of Violent Crimes Unit 2 at Nobong Police Station

=== Supporting ===
==== Bit-na's assistants ====
- Kim In-kwon as Gu Man-do

Bit-na's assistant who is a working-level official at Seoul Central District Court. He is possessed by a demon who is Justitia's assistant in Hell.

- Kim Ah-young as Lee A-rong

A shop worker. She is possessed by a demon who punishes demons who became humanized or have fallen in love with humans. She pretends to be Gremory to hide that she is actually Venato.

- Ha Kyung-min as Moon Dong-joo

A demon named Seire, who is a clean up demon, he entered a body soldier who was killed in a rollover of a military transport vehicle 10 years ago, and after being discharged from the military. He runs a cleaning company called Byeongjang Cleaning with Jae-hyun in the human world.

- Lee Joong-ok as Kim Jae-hyun

A demon named Dantalion, he entered a body soldier who was killed in a rollover of a military transport vehicle 10 years ago. He runs a cleaning company called Byeongjang Cleaning with Dong-joo in the human world.

==== People at Hwangcheon Villa ====
- Kim Jae-hwa as Jang Myeong-suk

Owner of Hwangcheon Villa where Bit-na lives and a devout believer who attends church every day without fail.

- Park Ji-yun as Yoo Jung-im

A tenant at Hwangcheon Villa who works from 9pm to 9am at a 24-hour noodle restaurant and raises Min-jun alone.

- Oh Han-kyul as Yoo Min-jun

Jung-im's son who is shy and gentle third-year middle school student.

- Kim Young-ok as Oh Mi-ja

An elderly tenant at Hwangcheon Villa who lives alone and collects waste paper for a living. She is a disguise of an angel named Gabriel, who vowed to protect Da-on after his family's death.

==== People at Nobong Police Station's Violent Crimes Unit 2 ====
- Kim Hye-hwa as Kim So-young

Hyung-seok's wife who is a team leader of Violent Crimes Unit at Nobong Police Station, who started her career as a police officer and rose to the position of inspector through her own abilities.

- Kim Ji-hoon as Park Dong-hoon

A veteran detective of Violent Crimes Unit 2 at Nobong Police Station.

- Park Ji-hoon as Ko Eun-seop

A third-year detective of Violent Crimes Unit 2 at Nobong Police Station.

==== People around Da-on ====
- Han Sang-jin as Joo Hyung-seok

So-young's husband and a detective at Nobong District Police Station. Unlike his blunt wife, he is infinitely affectionate and friend-like to his children, revealing his 'child-fool' side and warming them up.

- Lee Ga-yeon as Joo Da-hee

So-young and Hyung-seok's daughter who is a second-year middle school student.

==== Jung Jae-geol's family ====
- Kim Hong-pa as Jung Jae-geol

A five-term member of the National Assembly who started out as a self-made businessman.

- Lee Kyu-han as Jung Tae-gyu

Jae-geol's eldest son and the CEO of Taeok Construction. He has a handsome appearance with neat and well-mannered personality, and is a perfectionist who must do whatever he sets his mind to.

- Choi Dong-goo as Jung Seon-ho

Jae-geol's youngest son.

==== People at Seoul Central District Court ====
- Lee Gyu-hoe as Na Young-jin

Chief Judge of Seoul Central District Court. He appears to be noble on the outside, but he is actually a very vulgar person.

- Kim Kwang-kyu as Ahn Dae-young

A 22-year veteran judge of the 17th Criminal Division at Seoul Central District Court with a gentle and kind personality like a neighborhood uncle.

- Lee Mi-do as Seo Hwa-seon

A judge of the 16th Criminal Division at Seoul Central District Court. She is full of privilege and a sense of entitlement, and feels inferior to Bit-na, who is always ahead of her. She is also skilled in the art of subtly turning the tables on others by pretending to be worried about their mistakes.

- Do Eun-ha as Choi Won-kyung

An officer in the 18th criminal division of the Seoul Central District Court. She lives without much interest in others and often disrespects Bit-na.

==== Others ====
- Lee Kyu-han as Serial killer J

A killer who committed 5 crimes across Seoul and murdered 12 innocent civilians from the year 1998 to 1999.

- Kim Sang-woo

A young demon who is human despite being a devil due to the unclear distinction between good and evil since he was born not long ago.

- Park Jung-yeon as Cha Min-jeong

Jeong-jun's girlfriend and a dating violence victim.

- Jang Do-ha as Moon Jeong-jun

Min-jeong's boyfriend and a dating violence perpetrator.

- Choi Dae-hoon as Detective Jung Mun-jae

A detective possessed by demon, Paimon, his subordinate and Justitia's rival for 400 years.

- Kim Hyun-mok as Gabriel

An angel who appears in disguise.

=== Special appearances ===
- Yang Kyung-won as Yang Seung-bin
- Oh Na-ra as Justitia

A demon who enters the body of Bit-na.

- Shin Sung-rok

A demon of the highest rank, equivalent to the second-in-command of hell.

- Park Ho-san

A demon who escaped from Hell with Kylum but lost it while escaping on Earth and possessed the body of Jeong Jae-geol to stay hidden for 26 years.

== Production ==
=== Development ===
Produced by SBS' content production subsidiary Studio S, The Judge from Hell was written by Jo Yi-soo and directed by Park Jin-pyo.

In May 2025, Studio S confirmed a second season for the series.

=== Casting ===
Park Shin-hye and Kim Jae-young were reportedly cast as the lead actors of the series in September and December 2023, respectively.

On December 29, 2023, Park and Kim were confirmed to appear in the series.

=== Filming ===
Principal photography began in early 2024.

== Release ==
The Judge from Hell was confirmed to premiere on SBS TV on September 21, 2024, every Friday and Saturday at 22:00 (KST). The series is also available for streaming on Disney+ in selected regions.

== Reception ==
=== Viewership ===
The Judge from Hell : South Korea viewers per episode (millions)

Season	Episode number														Average
Season	1	2	3	4	5	6	7	8	9	10	11	12	13	14	Average
1	1.339	1.757	1.487	1.787	1.841	2.475	1.962	2.594	2.096	2.274	2.387	2.352	2.384	2.444	2.084

Source: Audience measurement performed nationwide by Nielsen Korea.

Average TV viewership ratings
Ep.	Original broadcast date	Average audience share	
Ep.	Original broadcast date	Nielsen Korea	
Ep.	Original broadcast date	Nationwide	Seoul
1	September 21, 2024	6.8% (6th)	7.2% (4th)
2	September 21, 2024	9.3% (2nd)	9.8% (2nd)
3	September 27, 2024	8.0% (4th)	8.5% (2nd)
4	September 28, 2024	9.7% (2nd)	9.8% (2nd)
5	October 4, 2024	9.3% (2nd)	9.2% (2nd)
6	October 5, 2024	13.1% (2nd)	13.5% (1st)
7	October 11, 2024	11.0% (1st)	11.1% (1st)
8	October 12, 2024	13.6% (2nd)	13.7% (1st)
9	October 18, 2024	11.5% (1st)	11.7% (1st)
10	October 19, 2024	11.4% (2nd)	10.9% (2nd)
11	October 25, 2024	12.6% (1st)	12.5% (1st)
12	October 26, 2024	11.7% (2nd)	11.5% (2nd)
13	November 1, 2024	11.9% (1st)	12.0% (1st)
14	November 2, 2024	11.9% (2nd)	11.3% (2nd)
Average		10.8%	10.9%
In the table above, the blue numbers represent the lowest ratings and the red numbers represent the highest ratings.

=== Accolades ===
==== Awards and nominations ====
Name of the award ceremony, year presented, category, nominee of the award, and the result of the nomination
Award ceremony	Year	Category	Nominee / Work	Result	Ref.
APAN Star Awards	2024	Excellence Award, Actress in a Miniseries	Park Shin-hye	Nominated	
APAN Star Awards	2024	Excellence Acting Award, Actor	Kim In-kwon	Nominated	
SBS Drama Awards	2024	Grand Prize (Daesang)	Park Shin-hye	Nominated	
SBS Drama Awards	2024	Director's Award	Park Shin-hye	Won	
SBS Drama Awards	2024	Top Excellence Award, Actor in a Miniseries	Kim Jae-young	Won	
SBS Drama Awards	2024	Lifetime Achievement Award	Kim Young-ok	Won	
SBS Drama Awards	2024	Excellence Award, Actor in a Miniseries	Kim Jae-young	Nominated	
SBS Drama Awards	2024	Excellence Award, Actor in a Miniseries	Lee Kyu-han	Nominated	
SBS Drama Awards	2024	Excellence Award, Actress in a Miniseries	Kim Ah-young	Won	
SBS Drama Awards	2024	Best Supporting Actor in a Miniseries	Kim In-kwon	Won	
SBS Drama Awards	2024	Best Supporting Actress in a Miniseries	Kim Jae-hwa	Won	
SBS Drama Awards	2024	Best Supporting Actress in a Miniseries	Kim Hye-hwa	Won	
SBS Drama Awards	2024	Best Performance	Lee Kyu-han	Won	
SBS Drama Awards	2024	Best Couple Award	Park Shin-hye and Kim Jae-young	Won	

==== Listicles ====
Name of publisher, year listed, name of listicle, and placement
Publisher	Year	Listicle	Placement	Ref.
Time Magazine	2024	The 10 Best K-Dramas of 2024	6th place	
