= Kimcheed Radish Cubes =

- Promotional poster
- Also known as: Just Love
- Written by: Lee Deok-jae
- Directed by: Kwon Seok-jang
- Starring: Kim Seung-soo; Yoo Ho-jeong; Park Shin-hye
- Country of origin: South Korea
- No. of episodes: 44

Production
- Producer: Lee Eun-kyu

Original release
- Network: Munhwa Broadcasting Corporation
- Release: August 18, 2007 – January 27, 2008

Kimcheed Radish Cubes (Korean: 깍두기; RR: Kkakdugi) is a South Korean television series. It aired on MBC from August 18, 2007 to January 27, 2008 on Saturdays and Sundays at 19:55 for 44 episodes.

The title is a reference to the kimchi side dish kkakdugi.

== Synopsis ==
Even though times change and our relationships with our family changes, our affection for them is timeless. The drama is about affection that is the foundation of family. Dong-jin is the eldest son in a family of 3 sons. He is dutiful and responsible but due to character clash, he has gone through divorce with his ex-wife, Ji-hye, whom he shares a child with. Dong-jin then starts a new romance with Eun-ho whom he works with. Jang Sa-ya is a girl that has grown up living in a secluded temple in the countryside. She meets and helps Park Jae-woo when he passes out in a forest nearby. He hangs her a card saying he would repay her if she ever goes to Seoul. As Sa-ya continues develops a curiosity of the world and wants to escape her "monk" life, her constant effort finally reaches an agreement with her guardian at the monastery. Her guardian tells her she has a father in Seoul, thus starting her venture to find her father. Along the way she meets some unfortunate events, and while searching for her father, Jae-woo soon falls for her.

== Cast ==
Jung family

- Kim Sung-kyum as Jung Gu-man
- Na Moon-hee as Na Dal-rae
- Kim Se-yoon as Jung Han-mo
- Go Doo-shim as Baek Geum-hee
- Kim Seung-soo as Jung Dong-jin
- Kim Heung-soo as Jung Dong-shik
- Seo Jun-young as Jung Dong-min
- Bang Joon-seo as Jung Ha-som

Lee family

- Seo In-seok as Lee Seung-yong
- Kim Ja-ok as Choi Ji-sook
- Yoo Ho-jeong as Yoo Eun-ho
- Kim Jung-hak as Lee Min-ki
- Park Jung-sook as Park Jae-young
- Lee Min-jung as Lee Min-do

Park family

- Choi Ran as Song Soo-nam
- Joo Sang-wook as Park Jae-woo

Extended cast

- Park Shin-hye as Jang Sa-ya
- Kim Bo-kyung as Seo Ji-hye
- Kil Yong-woo as Hwang Sang-beom
- Ahn Sun-young as Team Leader Yang
