= You're Beautiful (TV series) =

South Korean romance comedy television series

- Promotional poster for You're Beautiful
- Also known as: He's Beautiful
- Hangul: 미남이시네요
- Hanja: 美男이시네요
- Lit.: What a Handsome Man You Are
- RR: Minamisineyo
- MR: Minamisineyo
- Genre: Romance; Comedy; Musical; Drama
- Written by: Hong Jung-eun; Hong Mi-ran
- Directed by: Hong Sung-chang
- Starring: Park Shin-hye; Jang Keun-suk; Jung Yong-hwa; Lee Hong-gi
- Opening theme: "Still" by Lee Hong-gi
- Country of origin: South Korea
- Original language: Korean
- No. of episodes: 16

Production
- Executive producer: Jo Nam-guk
- Producers: Moon Seok-hwan; Park Ju-hee
- Production locations: South Korea; Japan
- Running time: 60 minutes Wednesdays and Thursdays at 21:55 (KST)
- Production companies: Bon Factory Worldwide; MI Inc. (formerly Market Insight Inc.)

Original release
- Network: SBS
- Release: October 7 – November 26, 2009

Related
- Ikemen desu ne (2011); Fabulous Boys (2013)

You're Beautiful (Korean: 미남이시네요) is a 2009 South Korean television series starring Jang Keun-suk, Park Shin-hye, Jung Yong-hwa of CNBLUE, and Lee Hong-gi of F. T. Island. The series follows a fictional musician band, A. N. JELL (Korean: 에이앤젤), and how the relationship between its members changes when a girl posing as her twin brother joins the band. It aired on SBS from October 7 to November 26, 2009, for 16 episodes.

== Synopsis ==
Ko Mi-nyeo (Park Shin-hye) has lived at an orphanage with her twin brother, Ko Mi-nam, since childhood after their father died. Years later, Mi-nam becomes a music idol, and Mi-nyeo lives in a junior nun dorm to fulfill her dream of becoming a nun. One day, Mi-nam successfully auditions for and wins the "A.N Entertainment" vocal auditions to join the musical band A.N.Jell. However, he must leave for the United States in order to correct his botched plastic surgery. Mi-nam's manager, Ma Hoon-yi (Kim In-kwon) approaches Mi-nyeo and requests her to pose as Mi-nam for a month until he recovers. Mi-nyeo is against it at first, but eventually agrees, as a path to fame would allow the twins to find their mother. Thus, Mi-nyeo poses as her brother and joins the band A.N.Jell, where she meets its members: the arrogant Hwang Tae-kyung (Jang Keun-suk), the gentle Kang Shin-woo (Jung Yong-hwa) and the bubbly Jeremy (Lee Hong-gi).

At first, Tae-kyung is against Mi-nyeo's addition and makes her life hard, while Shin-woo and Jeremy are friendly to her. Eventually, Tae-kyung discovers that Mi-nyeo is a girl and threatens to reveal it, but Mi-nyeo manages to win him over. Through their interactions, Tae-kyung begins to develop feelings for Mi-nyeo. Shin-woo and Jeremy also developed feelings for her, even though the latter thought that Mi-nyeo was a boy. As Mi-nyeo struggles to hide her secret from the media while performing with A.N.Jell, she discovers her mother's past, which is somehow connected with Tae-kyung.

== Cast ==
=== Main ===
- Jang Keun-suk as Hwang Tae-kyung

Lead vocalist and guitarist of A.N.JELL. Tae-kyung harbours a cold exterior but grows softer as he begins to fall for Mi-nyeo. He is troubled by his past and his distant relationship with his mother.

- Park Shin-hye as Ko Mi-nyeo / Gemma (female) and Ko Mi-nam (male; Oh Hee-joon plays Mi-nam's body double in Ep. 15)

A sweet and naive girl who aspires to become a nun. She is cajoled by her twin brother's manager to disguise herself as her twin in order to help keep his place in the band A.N.JELL, and to search for their mother. At first, the deception is to last for a day, but circumstances result in it being prolonged.

- Jung Yong-hwa as Kang Shin-woo

Bassist, rapper and keyboardist of A.N.JELL. Shin-woo is the first to discover Mi-nyeo's female identity, though he does not reveal this to anyone, including Mi-nyeo. Warm and gentle, he acts as Mi-nyeo's guardian but soon develops feelings for her.

- Lee Hong-gi as Jeremy

Vocalist and drummer of A.N.JELL. Bright and optimistic, Jeremy tends to be oblivious to things around him. He begins to develop feelings for Mi-nyeo and questions his sexuality because of it.

=== Supporting ===
- Uee as Yoo He-yi

A two-faced actress who later falls for Tae-kyung. She soon learns Mi-nyeo's secret and tries to use it against her.

- Kim In-kwon as Ma Hoon-yi

Mi-nam's manager.

- Kim Sung-ryung as Mo Hwa-ran

Famous actress and singer. She is Hwang Tae-kyung's "hidden" mother who abandoned him to be with her lover, also Mi-nyeo's father.

- Jung Chan as Ahn Seong-chang

President of talent agency A.N Entertainment.

- Choi Soo-eun as "Coordi" Wang

Stylist of A.N.JELL.

- Bae Geu-rin as Sa Yu-ri

A.N.JELL fan club president.

- Choi Ran as Go Mi-ja

Mi-nam and Mi-nyeo's aunt.

- Jang Won-young as Kim Young-ho

Photographer of Nara Daily News.

- Kim Dong-yeon as Kim Dong-jun

Mi-nam's high school friend who has a crush on Mi-nyeo, an extra in "Mi-nam"'s music video.

- Tae Hwang as assistant
- Kim Min-chan as backup dancer
- Seong Byeong-suk as head nun
- Jeon Hye-yeong A.N.JELL fanclub member
- Kim Min-young as A.N.JELL fanclub member
- Kim Young-hoon

=== Special appearances ===
- Lee Joo-yeon & Yoo So-young as girl group "Before School"
- Yoo Seung-ho as a convenience store customer (Ep. 9)
- Oh Hee-joon as Ko Mi-nam (Ep. 15)

== Soundtrack ==
미남이시네요 OST Part 1 / You're Beautiful Original Soundtrack

Soundtrack album by Various Artists
- Released: October 14, 2009
- Genre: Soundtrack
- Languages: Korean, English
- Labels: Sony; FNC

=== Part 1 ===
No.	Title	Music	Length
1.	"Still 여전히"	Lee Hong Ki	3:50
2.	"Descend from the Sky 하늘에서 내려와"	Miss S (Oh Yoo Mi (오유미), Jace (제이스), Kang Min Hee) feat. Oh Won Bin	3:06
3.	"Without Words 말도 없이"	9th STREET (나인 스트릿)	4:05
4.	"Lovely Day"	Park Shin-hye	2:04
5.	"Promise 약속"	Lee Hong Ki feat. Jung Yong Hwa	3:41
6.	"My heart Is Cursing 가슴이 욕해"	Kim Dong Wook	4:06
7.	"Without Words 말도 없이"	Park Shin-hye	4:07
8.	"Still 여전히"	A.N.JELL	3:50
9.	"Promise 약속"	A.N.JELL	3:42
10.	"Without Words (Piano Ver.) 말도 없이 (Piano Ver.)"	Various Artists	4:03
11.	"Still (Bossa Ver.) 여전히 (Bossa Ver.)"	Various Artists	2:08
Total length:			35:00

== Production ==
Jang Keun-suk and Park Shin-hye were both cast first, with director Hong Sung-chang stating that the two were well-suited to convey the "fresh" idol stars concept he wanted. Lee Hong-gi (a singer with the idol group F.T. Island) had been a child actor, and this was his acting comeback after a five-year break (his last acting project being Kkangsoon in 2005). Jung Yong-hwa made his acting debut with this role, which he auditioned for whilst preparing to debut with his band CNBLUE in Japan.

== Reception ==
=== Cultural impact ===
During its run, several car companies offered to have their cars be used in the drama for promotional purposes. The latest car from the German automaker Audi introduced their Audi S4 on the miniseries, with Jang Keun-suk driving it.

Although the drama achieved mediocre ratings for broadcast, it managed to gain a cult following, with many fans watching the drama online.

Due to the popularity of the show, the soundtrack album of the miniseries sold 20,000 copies within its first seven days of release. The album became a top seller on various music sites, such as MelOn, Dosirak, and Mnet. At the end of 2011, the album amassed a total of 57,000 copies in South Korea. The album was written and produced by Han Sung-ho, who also worked on the dramas Lovers, On Air, and Brilliant Legacy.

Because the drama features a concert footage of A.N.JELL in it, the cast members actually performed a mini-concert, where it was reported that as many 25,000 fans showed up. The group performed the songs "Promise" and "Still". Jang Keun-suk also sang "Good Bye" and "What Should I Do", the latter is the track Tae-kyung remakes for his mother in the drama. Park Shin-hye sang her character's theme song, "Lovely Day".

The series was also broadcast throughout Asia. It aired on channels such as Fuji TV in Japan, CCTV in China, BBTV in Thailand, 8TV in Malaysia on 2010, Channel U in Singapore, Indosiar in Indonesia, MBC 4 in UAE and ABS-CBN in Philippines When the series was broadcast in Japan on Fuji TV, it scored very high ratings beating out all of its competitors in its timeslot. The series became so popular in Japan that it is believed to have overtaken the popularity of Winter Sonata, another popular Korean drama in Japan.

=== Awards and nominations ===
Year	Award	Category	Recipient	Result
2009	SBS Drama Awards	Excellence Award, Actor in a Drama Special	Jang Keun-suk	Nominated
2009	SBS Drama Awards	Excellence Award, Actress in a Drama Special	Park Shin-hye	Nominated
2009	SBS Drama Awards	Best Supporting Actor in a Drama Special	Kim In-kwon	Nominated
2009	SBS Drama Awards	Best Supporting Actress in a Drama Special	Choi Ran	Nominated
2009	SBS Drama Awards	Top 10 Stars	Jang Keun-suk	Won
2009	SBS Drama Awards	New Star Award	Park Shin-hye	Won
2009	SBS Drama Awards	New Star Award	Lee Hong-gi	Won
2009	SBS Drama Awards	New Star Award	Jung Yong-hwa	Won
2009	SBS Drama Awards	Netizen Popularity Award	Jang Keun-suk	Won
2010	46th Baeksang Arts Awards	Best Director (TV)	Hong Sung-chang	Nominated
2010	3rd Korea Drama Awards	Most Popular Actor	Jung Yong-hwa	Won
2011	7th USTv Awards	Best Foreign Soap Opera	You're Beautiful	Won

=== Viewership ===
Ep.	Original broadcast date	Average audience share			
Ep.	Original broadcast date	TNmS		AGB Nielsen	
Ep.	Original broadcast date	Nationwide	Seoul	Nationwide	Seoul
1	7 October 2009	10.8%	11.6%	9.2%	9.7%
2	8 October 2009	9.6%	10.2%	7.6%	8.0%
3	14 October 2009	8.3%	8.5%	7.5%	8.1%
4	15 October 2009	8.9%	9.4%	7.7%	7.9%
5	21 October 2009	9.0%	9.2%	8.4%	8.5%
6	22 October 2009	10.0%	10.2%	8.9%	9.4%
7	28 October 2009	9.6%	10.2%	8.6%	8.8%
8	29 October 2009	9.8%	10.3%	9.0%	9.3%
9	4 November 2009	9.8%	10.3%	9.4%	9.6%
10	5 November 2009	10.0%	10.5%	10.8%	11.6%
11	11 November 2009	11.0%	11.3%	10.4%	10.5%
12	12 November 2009	11.1%	11.1%	10.9%	10.6%
13	18 November 2009	10.6%	11.1%	9.1%	8.8%
14	19 November 2009	10.1%	10.0%	9.4%	9.6%
15	25 November 2009	10.9%	11.7%	9.5%	9.6%
16	26 November 2009	11.9%	12.2%	10.3%	11.0%
Average		10.1%	10.5%	9.2%	9.4%

Source: TNmS Media Korea, AGB Nielsen Korea

== Remake ==
A Japanese remake of this drama aired in Japan in 2011 with the title He is Beautiful, and included a cameo appearance by Jang Keun-suk in episode 8 as himself. A Taiwanese remake, Fabulous Boys was broadcast in 2013, which included a cameo by Park Shin-hye in the first episode as Go Mi-nyeo.
