= Flower Boys Next Door =

2013 South Korean television series

- Promotional poster
- Genre: Romance, Comedy
- Created by: Choi Jin-hee, Park Ji-young
- Based on: I Steal Peeks At Him Every Day by Yoo Hyun-sook
- Written by: Kim Eun-jung
- Directed by: Jung Jung-hwa
- Starring: Park Shin-hye; Yoon Shi-yoon; Kim Ji-hoon
- Opening theme: "Flower Boy Next Door (Title)" by 이크거북
- Ending theme: "Ready-Merry-Go!" by Romantic Punch "I Wish It Was You" by Lee Jung
- Country of origin: South Korea
- Original language: Korean
- No. of episodes: 16

Production
- Executive producer: Jo Moon-joo
- Producer: Park Seong-hye
- Production location: South Korea
- Production companies: Oh! Boy Project, CJ E&M

Original release
- Network: tvN
- Release: 7 January – 25 February 2013

Related
- Cool Guys, Hot Ramen; Flower Band; Dating Agency: Cyrano

Flower Boys Next Door is a 2013 South Korean television series. It aired on tvN from January 7 to February 26, 2013, on Mondays and Tuesdays at 23:00 (KST) for 16 episodes. Directed by Jung Jung-hwa (who previously helmed Cool Guys, Hot Ramen) and written by movie screenwriter Kim Eun-jung (Gabi, Hwang Jin-yi), it is the third installment of cable channel tvN's "Oh! Boy" series of Flower Boy programming targeted at the teenage demographic.

== Synopsis ==
Go Dok-mi (played by Park Shin-hye) is a shy, frugal freelance copy editor who refuses to leave her apartment or interact with people as much as possible. Every day, using a pair of binoculars, she steals peeks at her neighbor across the street, Han Tae-joon, as he goes through his daily morning routine. She had fallen in love with Tae-joon at first sight, after witnessing him pick up a puppy in a box and taking it home. When she looked out her window and saw him living in the apartment opposite hers, she thought of it as fate.

Webtoon artist Oh Jin-rak (Kim Ji-hoon) lives in the same apartment building as Dok-mi. He has been in love with Dok-mi for ages, and anonymously leaves a carton of milk with a post-it attached by her door every day. He created a webtoon with his drawing partner Oh Dong-hoon (Go Kyung-pyo), titled "Flower Boy Next Door", based on Dok-mi's life as well as his desire to draw her out into the world.

Enrique Geum (Yoon Shi-yoon), a genius video game developer, arrives in Seoul from Spain. His reason for coming is "cupid's arrow". Though he's in love with his best friend Yoon Seo-young (Kim Yoon-hye), she has feelings instead for his older cousin, Han Tae-joon, so he intends to play cupid for the two. That same day, a new neighbor Watanabe Ryu moves into the apartment across to Dok-mi and Jin-rak.

When Enrique comes to stay at Tae-joon's apartment, he catches Dok-mi in the act. Naturally curious and inquisitive, Enrique decides to find out the reason why Dok-mi is living in recluse. Meanwhile, Jin-rak is threatened by Enrique's sudden intrusion into Dok-mi's life.

With all of these new men suddenly entering her life, Dok-mi's solitary and orderly world is turned upside down.

== Cast ==
=== Main ===
- Park Shin-hye as Go Dok-mi, a modern Rapunzel who has locked herself up in her "tower" to hide from the world.
- Yoon Shi-yoon as Enrique Geum, a fun-loving genius who developed a successful video game at 17 and is interested in soccer.
- Kim Ji-hoon as Oh Jin-rak/Oh Jae-won, an attractive, yet stubborn webtoon artist who is in love with Dok-mi.

=== Supporting ===
- Go Kyung-pyo as Oh Dong-hoon, Jin-rak's roommate and drawing partner who freeloads off him, and is known around the neighborhood for his chic looks and wiles.
- Park Soo-jin as Cha Do-hwi, a businesswoman who runs a shopping mall. She projects an elegant, easygoing image, but her friendliness doesn't extend to Dok-mi, whom she bullied in high school. She falls in love with Jin-rak and tries to win his heart. Her childhood best friend was Go Dok-mi while in elementary school.
- Kim Yoon-hye as Yoon Seo-young

Enrique's best friend and first love. She is a free spirit who throws herself wholeheartedly after something she wants.

- Kim Jung-san as Han Tae-joon

Enrique's older cousin. He has a complicated relationship with Seo-young, and is liked from afar by Dok-mi.

- Mizuta Kouki as Watanabe Ryu

The new Japanese neighbor who came to Korea to learn the cuisine.

- Kim Seul-gi as Kim Seul-gi

Jin-rak and Dong-hoon's webtoon editor and the deputy manager of the Contents Development team.

=== Special appearances ===
- Lee Jong-hyuk as Hongdae guru (ep. 1)
- Park Se-young as new artist who's similar to Dok-mi (ep. 16)

== Original soundtrack ==
1. Flower Boys Next Door (Title) - Leekeugeobook (이크거북)
2. Ready-Merry-Go! - Romantic Punch
3. Talkin' Bout Love - J Rabbit
4. I Wish It Was You - Lee Jung
5. Pitch Black - Park Shin-hye
6. I Want to Date You - Yoon Shi-yoon
7. Memories of That Day - Leekeugeobook (이크거북)
8. I Wake Up Because of You - Kim Seul-gi feat. Go Kyung-pyo
9. Look at Me - Son Ho-young
10. Pitch Black (Acoustic ver.) - Park Shin-hye
11. I Wish It Was You (Inst.)
12. Talkin' Bout Love (Inst.)
13. I Want to Date You (Inst.)
14. I Wake Up Because of You (Inst.)
15. Ready-Merry-Go! (Inst.)
16. About Her (That Woman's Story Theme) - Leekeugeobook (이크거북)

== Ratings ==
In this table, the blue numbers represent the lowest ratings and the red numbers represent the highest ratings.

Ep.	Original broadcast date	Title	Average audience share
Ep.	Original broadcast date	Title	AGB Nielsen
Ep.	Original broadcast date	Title	Nationwide
1	January 7, 2013	I steal peeks at him every day	0.552% (tvN only)
2	January 8, 2013	Just leave me alone, please!!	0.841% (tvN only)
3	January 14, 2013	First love hurts and unrequited love is sad	1.228% (tvN + OnStyle)
4	January 15, 2013	No such thing as kind lies or white lies?	1.504% (tvN + OnStyle)
5	January 21, 2013	I make up 1000 excuses to meet you by chance	1.309% (tvN + OnStyle)
6	January 22, 2013	The related keywords for 'meeting' are 'fate' and 'ill-fated'	1.690% (tvN + OnStyle)
7	January 28, 2013	Pride and prejudice and misunderstanding	1.445% (tvN + OnStyle)
8	January 29, 2013	There's a hazardous tunnel zone ahead	1.409% (tvN + OnStyle)
9	February 4, 2013	I love you as much as I know you, I know you as much as I love you	1.003% (tvN + OnStyle)
10	February 5, 2013	If you want to know about your enemy, see things from his eyes, not yours	1.390% (tvN + OnStyle)
11	February 11, 2013	Can I go back to being the old me?	1.356% (tvN only)
12	February 12, 2013	The wind is blowing. I like you	1.470% (tvN only)
13	February 18, 2013	Is it to dream a new dream?	1.302% (tvN only)
14	February 19, 2013	Love is to see different maps at times	1.121% (tvN only)
15	February 25, 2013	Love sometimes seeks a further path	1.190% (tvN only)
16	February 26, 2013	Love your neighbor	1.409% (tvN only)
Average			1.264%

- This drama airs on a cable channel/pay TV which normally has a relatively smaller audience compared to free-to-air TV/public broadcasters (KBS, SBS, MBC and EBS).

== Awards and nominations ==
Year	Award	Category	Recipient	Result
2016	tvN10 Awards	Romantic-Comedy Queen	Park Shin-hye	Nominated
