= Dead End =

Dead End or dead end may refer to:

- Dead end street, a street connected only at one end with other streets, called by many other official names, including cul-de-sac.

== Stage, film and television ==
- The Dead End (1914 film), directed by David Hartford
- Dead End (play), a 1935 play by Pulitzer prize winner Sidney Kingsley
- Dead End Kids, the actors who appeared in Dead End, the 1935 Broadway play and the 1937 film
- Dead End (1937 film), a crime drama film
- No Exit or Dead End, a 1944 play by Jean-Paul Sartre
- Dead End (1969 film), a Hong Kong film by Chang Cheh
- Dead End (1969 Italian film), an Italian film starring Andrea Giordana and Evelyn Stewart
- Dead End (1977 film), an Iranian film
- Dead End (1998 film), an American film starring Eric Roberts
- Dead End (1999 film), an Australian film by Iren Koster and starring William Snow
- Dead End (2003 film), a film by Jean-Baptiste Andrea and Fabrice Canepa
- Dead End (2006 film) or No Exit, a 2006 Israeli film
- Dead End (2013 film), a South Korean mystery thriller
- Batman: Dead End, a 2003 fan film by Sandy Collora
- The Dead End, a 2015 Chinese film
- "Dead End" (seaQuest DSV), a 1994 episode of seaQuest DSV
- "Dead End" (Angel), a 2001 episode of Angel
- Dead End (Transformers), several robot supervillain characters in the Transformers robot superhero franchise.
- Dead End: Paranormal Park, a 2022 animated web series on Netflix
- Dead End, a web show on Cartoon Hangover
- "Dead End", the sixth episode of the animated web series Murder Drones, 2023

== Music ==
- Dead End, a 1977 album by Japanese rock band Godiego
- Dead End (band), an influential Japanese metal-rock band formed in 1984
- Dead End (Turbo album), 1990
- Dead End EP, a 2003 EP by Kristofer Åström and Hidden Trucks
- Dead End, a 2003 album by Seventh Star
- Dead End, a 2001 album by The Newlydeads
- "Dead End" (song), a 2025 song by Gen Hoshino
- "Dead End", a 2002 song by Red Harvest from Sick Transit Gloria Mundi
- "Dead End", a 2003 song by Sam Roberts from We Were Born in a Flame
- "Dead End", a 2006 song by In Flames from Come Clarity
- "Dead Ends", a 2006 song by Chad VanGaalen from Skelliconnection
- "Dead End", a 2009 song by Master Shortie from A.D.H.D
- "Dead END", a 2012 song by Faylan, the second opening theme for Future Diary
- "Dead End", a 2014 song by Godflesh from A World Lit Only by Fire
- "Dead End", a 2021 song by Twelve Foot Ninja from Vengeance

== Literature ==
- Dead End (manga), a Japanese manga series by Shohei Manabe
- Dead End, an event in the manga series Future Diary where a player dies
- Death's End (死神永生), a 2010 novel by Liu Cixin, is sometimes translated as Dead End
- Deadenders, a science fiction comic book series by Ed Brubaker
- Dead Enders, a science fiction series by Mike Resnick

== See also ==
- Dead End Street, a 1982 film directed by Yaky Yosha
- "Dead End Street" (song), a 1966 song by The Kinks
- Cul-de-sac (disambiguation)
- Dead-end tower, a type of transmission tower
