= Wuri =

Wuri or WURI may refer to the following articles:

- Wuri, Taichung, a district in Taiwan
- Wuri's Family, a South Korean TV show
- WCPE, a radio station in North Carolina formerly known as WURI
