= Kim Dae-seung =

South Korean filmmaker (born 1967)

- Born: June 18, 1967 (age 59); South Korea
- Education: Chung-Ang University - Film Studies
- Occupations: Film director, screenwriter

Korean name
- Hangul: 김대승
- RR: Gim Daeseung
- MR: Kim Taesŭng

Kim Dae-seung (Korean: 김대승; born June 18, 1967) is a South Korean film director and screenwriter.

== Career ==
After graduating from Chung-Ang University with a degree in Film Studies, Kim Dae-seung first honed his filmmaking skills as a protege of legendary Korean director Im Kwon-taek, working for almost ten years as Im's assistant director on major films such as Seopyeonje (1993), The Taebaek Mountains (1994), and Chunhyang (2000).

Kim made his directorial debut with Bungee Jumping of Their Own (2001), a melodrama about homosexuality and reincarnation. Despite its taboo subject, the film was received well by audiences and critics due to Kim's sensitive direction and the acting by leads Lee Byung-hun and Lee Eun-ju.

He subsequently directed Blood Rain (2005), a mystery thriller set in the late Joseon Dynasty. The surprise casting of Cha Seung-won (then-known for comedic roles) and newcomer Park Yong-woo paid off, resulting in critical acclaim and an unexpectedly robust box office. Blood Rain received multiple acting and technical nominations from local award-giving bodies, and won Best Film at the Chunsa Film Art Awards, the Baeksang Arts Awards, and the Yubari International Fantastic Film Festival.

Kim's third film was based on the true story of the 1995 collapse of Sampoong Department Store which claimed 502 lives and wounded 937. Traces of Love (2006) explores the painful aftermath of trauma and loss, guilt and memory, against the backdrop of beautiful autumn scenery. The melodrama starred Yoo Ji-tae, Kim Ji-soo and Uhm Ji-won, and was the opening film of the 11th Pusan International Film Festival.

In 2011, Kim directed Q&A as part of If You Were Me 5, an omnibus commissioned by the National Human Rights Commission of Korea. Starring television star Kim Hyun-joo, the short film denounced the collection and control of personal information that leads to sexual harassment in the Korean male-dominated workplace.

Kim returned to feature filmmaking in 2012 with the erotic period drama The Concubine starring Jo Yeo-jeong, Kim Dong-wook and Kim Min-jun. The film, which delves into sexual politics and its role in a power struggle within the royal court, was a hit following its early summer release.

== Filmography ==
- The Magician (2015) - director, screenplay
- The Concubine (2012) - director, screenplay
- Q&A (short film from If You Were Me 5, 2011) - director, screenplay
- Traces of Love (2006) - director
- Blood Rain (2005) - director, script editor
- Low Life (2004) - special appearance
- Bungee Jumping of Their Own (2001) - director
- Chunhyang (1999) - supporting director
- Downfall (1997) - screenplay, assistant director
- Festival (1996) - assistant director
- The Real Man (1996) - assistant director
- The Taebaek Mountains (1994) - assistant director
- Seopyeonje (1993) - assistant director

== Awards ==
- 22nd Blue Dragon Film Awards - Best New Director
- 24th Golden Cinema Awards - Best New Director
- 13th Chunsa Film Art Awards - Best Director
