= Cho Yeo-jeong =

South Korean actress (born 1981)

- Cho in 2026
- Born: February 10, 1981 (age 45); Seoul, South Korea
- Other names: Jo Yeo-jeong; Cho Yeo-jung
- Education: Dongguk University
- Occupation: Actress
- Years active: 1997–present
- Agent: High Entertainment

Korean name
- Hangul: 조여정
- RR: Jo Yeojeong
- MR: Cho Yŏjŏng

Cho Yeo-jeong (Korean: 조여정; born February 10, 1981) is a South Korean actress. She is best known internationally for her role in the film Parasite (2019), which won four Academy Awards and became the first non-English language film to win Best Picture.

Cho is also known for her roles in the films The Servant (2010), The Concubine (2012), and Obsessed (2014), as well as the television series I Need Romance (2011), Lovers of Haeundae (2012), Divorce Lawyer in Love (2015), Woman of 9.9 Billion (2019–2020), and Cheat on Me If You Can (2020–2021).

== Life and career ==
Cho Yeo-jeong was born in Seoul, South Korea. She debuted as a CeCi Magazine cover girl at the age of 16 in 1997, and began actively acting in 1999. Despite appearing in drama series, music videos, and TV commercials afterwards, she remained obscure. During this period, she was also unhappy with the limited roles being offered to her.

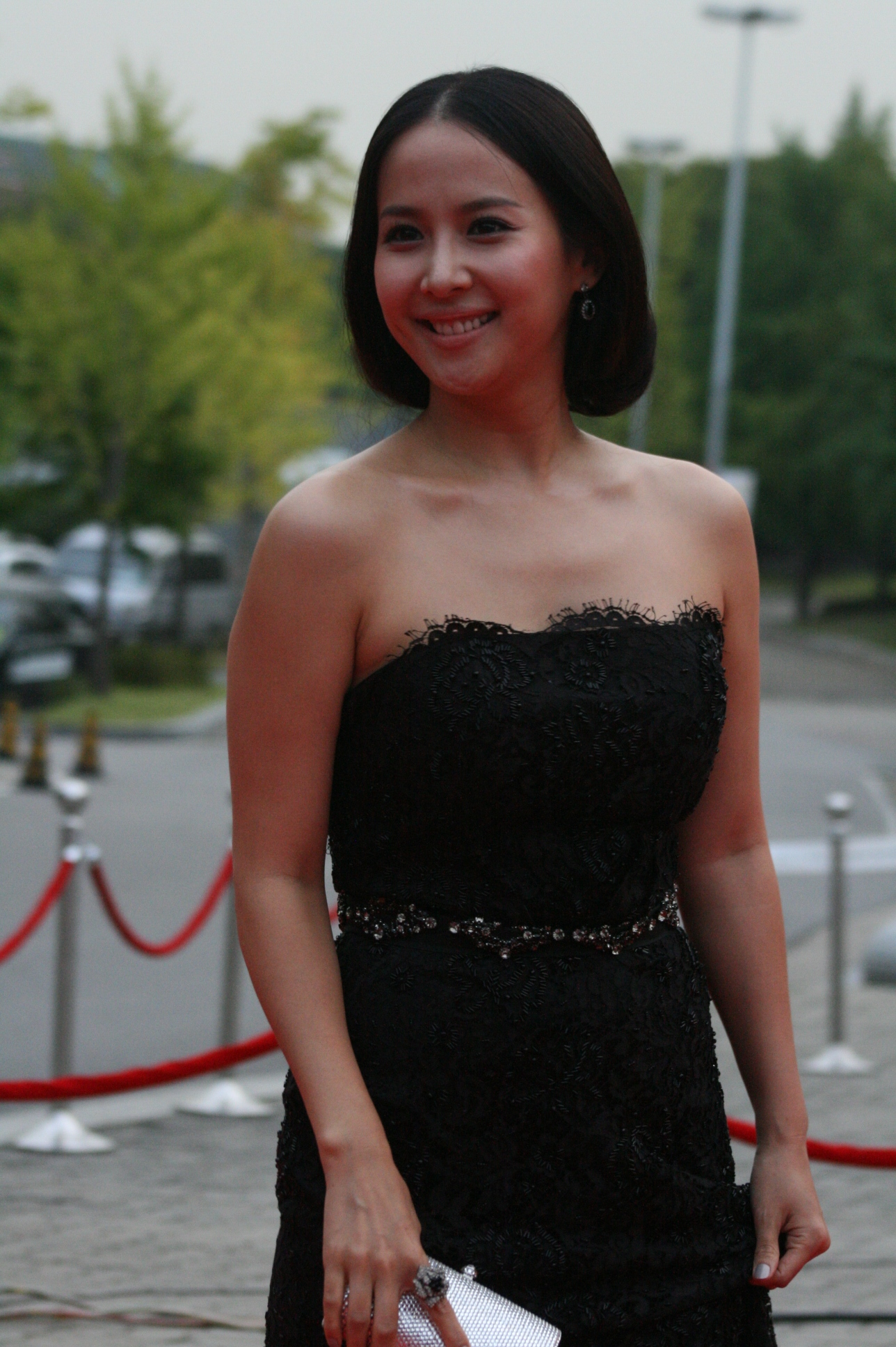
Cho in 2009

Then Cho rose to the spotlight in 2010 by starring as the ambitious Joseon period woman of lower class in the erotic period drama The Servant. The R-rated movie, which was a newly adapted and tragic version of Korea's famous folktale The Story of Chunhyang, had been turned down by a number of actresses because it contained too many sex scenes. Cho, however, took advantage of the opportunity and it turned out to be a huge stepping stone in her career. Upon the release of the film, Cho successfully escaped being "another pretty face" in Korea's entertainment scene.

In 2011, Cho starred in hit cable series I Need Romance, a sexually frank and funny comedy about a group of single thirty-something girlfriends navigating the dating scene in Seoul, which boasted stylish and slick production values.

Few would have expected her to star in another period drama that required full nudity, as doing so may have stigmatized her in Korea's film industry. Despite the collective concerns expressed by local media that she was "going nude too often," in 2012 the actress chose another period thriller with explicit sex scenes. She had admired the work of director Kim Dae-seung and wanted to work with him, so after reading his latest script, she pursued being cast as the complex titular character of The Concubine. Despite the hype, the film was critically praised. In an interview for the film, Cho said that most of all, she wants to be seen as an adventurous and intriguing actress.

In the 2012 romantic comedy series Lovers of Haeundae, Cho played the bright and cheerful daughter of a Busan gangster, who falls in love with the amnesiac undercover prosecutor living with them. A year later, Cho's book Healing Beauty was published, containing tips and advice on health and beauty, based on the know-how she's amassed as an actress over her 16-year career.

In 2013, Cho became involved in a publicized contract dispute when she signed a new contract with Bom Entertainment while her contract with Didim531 was still in effect. The Korea Entertainment Management Association suggested that Cho avoid working with both agencies, and she joined Neos Entertainment in 2014.

Cho starred in two movies in 2014. She reunited with director Kim Dae-woo (The Servant) in another erotic period film, this time set during the Vietnam War, titled Obsessed. She also played an abducted wife in The Target, a remake of French action-thriller Point Blank.

In 2015, Cho starred in the sex comedy Casa Amor: Exclusive for Ladies, which she said made her realize "how gratifying it is to see people laughing because of me." She said further, "Casa Amor: Exclusive for Ladies is the first film I've done in a long time whose story focuses on women. I hope that, building on the success of this film, more films featuring women's voices and experiences are made."

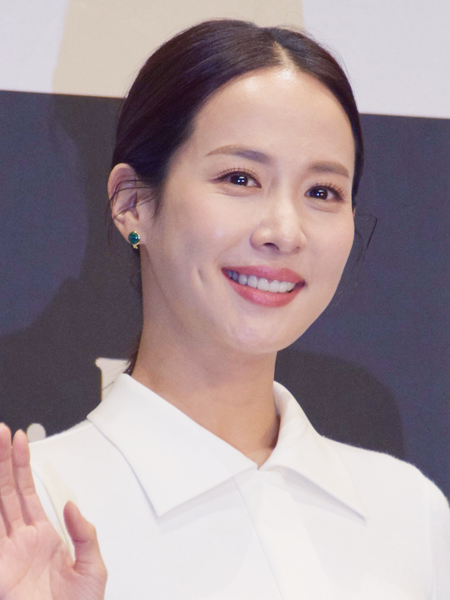
Cho in 2019

Cho starred in television series Woman of 9.9 Billion in 2019 and Cheat on Me If You Can in 2020.

== Filmography ==
=== Film ===
| Year | Title | Role | Notes | Ref. |
|---|---|---|---|---|
| 2002 | A Perfect Match | Min-ah | | |
| 2006 | Vampire Cop Ricky | Yeon-hee | | |
| 2010 | The Servant | Chun-hyang | | |
| 2012 | The Concubine | Shin Hwa-yeon | | |
| 2014 | The Target | Jung Hee-joo | | |
| 2014 | Obsessed | Lee Sook-jin | | |
| 2015 | Casa Amor: Exclusive for Ladies | Baek Bo-hee | | |
| 2019 | Parasite | Choi Yeon-gyo / Mrs. Park | | |
| 2024 | Hidden Face | Su-yeon | | |
| 2025 | My Daughter Is a Zombie | Shin Yeon-hwa | | |
| 2025 | Murderer Report | Baek Sun-ju | | |
| 2026 | Possible Love | Ye-ji | | |

=== Television series ===
| Year | Title | Role | Notes | Ref. |
|---|---|---|---|---|
| 1999 | How Am I? | | | |
| 1999 | Last War | | | |
| 1999 | You Don't Know My Mind | Yang Mi-ri | | |
| 2000 | Roll of Thunder | | | |
| 2002 | Rustic Period | Ae-ran | | |
| 2002 | Royal Story: Jang Hui-bin | Royal Consort 'Gwiin' Kim | | |
| 2003 | South of the Sun | Noh Hye-in | | |
| 2003 | A Problem at My Younger Brother's House | Oh Dan-bi | | |
| 2004 | Terms of Endearment | Na Ae-ri | | |
| 2004 | I'm From Chosun | Lee Han-sol | | |
| 2006 | So In Love | Lee Sun-joo | | |
| 2008 | War of Money: The Original | Choi Ji-in | | |
| 2009 | The Road Home | Jang Mi-ryung | | |
| 2009 | Hometown Legends: "Myo-jeong's Pearl" | So-won | | |
| 2011 | I Need Romance | Sunwoo In-young | | |
| 2012 | Lovers of Haeundae | Go So-ra | | |
| 2015 | Divorce Lawyer in Love | Go Cheok-hee | | |
| 2016 | Babysitter | Lee Sang-won's wife | | |
| 2016 | Love in the Moonlight | | Cameo (episode 1) | |
| 2017 | Ms. Perfect | Lee Eun-hee | | |
| 2019 | Beautiful World | Seo Eun-joo | | |
| 2019 | Woman of 9.9 Billion | Jeong Seo-yeon | | |
| 2020–2021 | Cheat on Me If You Can | Kang Yeo-ju novel writer | | |
| 2021 | High Class | Song Yeo-uol | | |
| 2022 | Behind Every Star | Herself | Cameo | |
| 2024 | Tarot | Ji-woo | Episode 1 | |
| 2025–2026 | Made in Korea | Bae Geum-ji | | |
| 2026 | The Affair Was Just the Beginning | Soo-jeong | | |

=== Variety show ===
| Year | Title | Role | Notes | Ref. |
|---|---|---|---|---|
| 1997 | Ppo Ppo Ppo (Kiss Kiss Kiss) | Host | | |
| 2001 | 21st Century Committee | Cast member | | |
| 2001 | Fairyland Ggumdongsan | Host | | |
| 2003 | Soulmates | Cast member | | |
| 2008 | We Got Married - Season 1 | Cast member | Paired with Lee Hwi-jae | |
| 2010 | Girls on Top - Season 2 | Host | | |
| 2010 | Fox's Butler | Cast member | | |
| 2011 | O'live Beauty On-Air | Host | | |
| 2012 | Saturday Night Live Korea | Host | | |
| 2013 | Law of the Jungle in Caribbean/Maya Jungle | Cast member | | |
| 2019 | Surfing House | Cast member | | |
| 2021 | Saturday Night Live Korea | Host | Episode 5 | |

=== Music video appearances ===
| Year | Title | Artist(s) | Ref. |
|---|---|---|---|
| 2011 | "Even Now" | Sung Si-kyung | |
| 2019 | "Fever" | J. Y. Park ft. Superbee & Bibi | |

== Ambassadorship ==
| Year | Title | Ref. |
|---|---|---|
| 2021 | Korean Seafood Export Ambassador | |

== Musical theatre ==
| Year | Title | Role |
|---|---|---|
| 2005 | Grease | Sandy |

== Discography ==
| Year | Song title | Artist | Notes |
|---|---|---|---|
| 2011 | "Aegyo (Charm)" | Jo Yeo-jeong and Kim Jeong-hoon | Track from I Need Romance OST |
| 2011 | "Winter Story" | Jo Yeo-jeong, Park Si-hoo, Park Si-yeon, Nam Gyu-ri, Jo Dal-hwan, Ryohei Otani, Choi Sung-joon and Jung Woo-jin | Eyagi Entertainment; Christmas 2011 single |

== Bibliography ==
| Year | Title | Publisher | ISBN |
|---|---|---|---|
| 2013 | Healing Beauty | Paper Book | ISBN 9788997148295 |

== Accolades ==
=== Awards and nominations ===
Name of the award ceremony, year presented, category, nominee of the award, and the result of the nomination
| Award ceremony | Year | Category | Nominee / Work | Result | Ref. |
|---|---|---|---|---|---|
| APAN Star Awards | 2021 | Top Excellence Award, Actress in a Miniseries | Woman of 9.9 Billion | Nominated | |
| Baeksang Arts Awards | 2011 | Best Actress – Film | The Servant | Nominated | |
| Baeksang Arts Awards | 2015 | Best Supporting Actress – Film | Obsessed | Nominated | |
| Baeksang Arts Awards | 2020 | Best Actress – Film | Parasite | Nominated | |
| Baeksang Arts Awards | 2025 | Best Actress – Film | Hidden Face | Nominated | |
| Blue Dragon Film Awards | 2010 | Popular Star Award | The Servant | Won | |
| Blue Dragon Film Awards | 2010 | Best New Actress | The Servant | Nominated | |
| Blue Dragon Film Awards | 2014 | Best Supporting Actress | Obsessed | Nominated | |
| Blue Dragon Film Awards | 2019 | Best Actress | Parasite | Won | |
| Blue Dragon Film Awards | 2026 | Best Supporting Actress | Possible Love | Pending | |
| Bucheon International Fantastic Film Festival | 2010 | Fantasia Award | Cho Yeo-jeong | Won | |
| Buil Film Awards | 2012 | Best Actress | The Concubine | Nominated | |
| Buil Film Awards | 2014 | Best Supporting Actress | Obsessed | Nominated | |
| Buil Film Awards | 2019 | Best Actress | Parasite | Nominated | |
| Chicago Film Critics Association Awards | 2019 | Best Supporting Actress | Parasite | Nominated | |
| Chunsa Film Art Awards | 2019 | Best Actress | Parasite | Won | |
| Critics' Choice Awards | 2020 | Parasite | Best Acting Ensemble | Nominated | |
| Grand Bell Awards | 2010 | Best Actress | The Servant | Nominated | |
| Grand Bell Awards | 2014 | Best Supporting Actress | Obsessed | Nominated | |
| IndieWire Critics Poll | 2019 | Best Supporting Actress | Parasite | 15th place | |
| KBS Drama Awards | 2012 | Best Couple Award | Cho Yeo-jeong (with Kim Kang-woo); Lovers of Haeundae | Nominated | |
| KBS Drama Awards | 2012 | Excellence Award, Actress in a Miniseries | Lovers of Haeundae | Nominated | |
| KBS Drama Awards | 2012 | Netizen Award, Actress | Lovers of Haeundae | Nominated | |
| KBS Drama Awards | 2016 | Best Actress in a One-Act/Special/Short Drama | Babysitter | Won | |
| KBS Drama Awards | 2017 | Excellence Award, Actress in a Mid-length Drama | Perfect Wife | Won | |
| KBS Drama Awards | 2017 | Netizen Award, Actress | Perfect Wife | Nominated | |
| KBS Drama Awards | 2019 | Top Excellence Award, Actress | Woman of 9.9 Billion | Won | |
| KBS Drama Awards | 2019 | Excellence Award, Actress in a Miniseries | Woman of 9.9 Billion | Nominated | |
| KBS Drama Awards | 2019 | Netizen Award, Actress | Woman of 9.9 Billion | Nominated | |
| KBS Drama Awards | 2020 | Best Couple Award | Cho Yeo-jeong (with Go Jun); Cheat on Me If You Can | Won | |
| KBS Drama Awards | 2020 | Excellence Award, Actress in a Miniseries | Cheat on Me If You Can | Won | |
| KBS Drama Awards | 2020 | Netizen Award, Actress | Cheat on Me If You Can | Nominated | |
| KBS Drama Awards | 2020 | Top Excellence Award, Actress | Cheat on Me If You Can | Nominated | |
| KOFRA Film Awards | 2015 | Best Supporting Actress | Obsessed | Won | |
| Korea Best Dresser Swan Awards | 2010 | Best Dressed, Movie Actress category | Cho Yeo-jeong | Won | |
| Korea Drama Awards | 2011 | Special Award for Cable TV | I Need Romance | Nominated | |
| Korean Association of Film Critics Awards | 2014 | Best Supporting Actress | Obsessed | Won | |
| New Mexico Film Critics | 2019 | Best Supporting Actress | Parasite | Won | |
| SBS Drama Awards | 2015 | Excellence Award, Actress in a Miniseries | Divorce Lawyer in Love | Nominated | |
| SBS Entertainment Awards | 2013 | Popularity Award | Law of the Jungle in Caribbean/Maya Jungle | Won | |
| Actor Awards | 2020 | Outstanding Performance by a Cast in a Motion Picture | Parasite | Won | |
| Style Icon Awards | 2011 | SIA's Discovery | Cho Yeo-jeong | Won | |

=== Listicles ===
Name of publisher, year listed, name of listicle, and placement
| Publisher | Year | Listicle | Placement | Ref. |
|---|---|---|---|---|
| Forbes | 2020 | Korea Power Celebrity 40 | 30th | |
| Korean Film Council | 2021 | Korean Actors 200 (Note: Introduces 200 actors that best represent the present and future of Korean cinema to the people in the film industry all over the world.) | Included | |
| The Screen | 2019 | 2009–2019 Top Box Office Powerhouse Actors in Korean Movies | 43rd | |
