= Babysitter (TV series) =

- Promotional poster
- Genre: Mystery; Thriller; Suspense
- Screenplay by: Choi Hyo-bi
- Directed by: Kim Yong-soo
- Starring: Cho Yeo-jeong; Kim Min-jun; Shin Yoon-joo; Lee Seung-joon
- Composer: Park Sung-jin
- Country of origin: South Korea
- Original language: Korean
- No. of episodes: 4

Production
- Executive producer: Hong Suk-goo
- Producers: Moon Joon-ha (KBS); Son Jae-yeon (L&Holdings); Lee Sung-jin (L&Holdings)
- Running time: 61-65 minutes
- Production company: L&Holdings

Original release
- Network: KBS2
- Release: March 14 – March 22, 2016

Babysitter (Korean: 베이비시터) is a four-episode Korean drama, airing on KBS2 from March 14, 2016, starring Cho Yeo-jeong, Kim Min-jun, Shin Yoon-joo, and Lee Seung-joon.

== Synopsis ==
Jang Suk-ryoo (Shin Yoon-joo) is a 24-year-old university graduate who majors in English literature. As she begins to work as a babysitter for a rich family with three children, strange events start happening, resulting in an ambiguous relationship with the father, Lee Sang-won (Kim Min-jun).

== Cast ==
- Cho Yeo-jeong as Chun Eun-joo
- Kim Min-jun as Yoo Sang-won
- Shin Yoon-joo as Jang Suk-ryoo
- Lee Seung-joon as Pyo Young-gyoon
- Gil Hae-yeon as Yoo Sang-won's mother
- Kim Mi-ra as Housework assistant
- Kim Ye-rang as Chun Eun-joo's friend
- Hwang Eun-soo as Yoo Sang-won's college friend
- Yoon Ji-min as Yoo Eun-byul
- Ri Min as Im Tae-young
- Kim Do-joon as Reporter
- Kim Hyun as Mi-yeong's friend
- Lee Won-jong as Yoo Sang-won's father
- Kim Sang-ho as Jo Sang-won

== Ratings ==
In this table, the blue numbers represent the lowest ratings and the red numbers represent the highest ratings.

Ep.	Original broadcast date	Average audience share	
Ep.	Original broadcast date	TNmS	AGB Nielsen
1	March 14, 2016	3.3%	3.1%
2	March 15, 2016	3.4%	3.1%
3	March 21, 2016	3.2%	3.2%
4	March 22, 2016	3.8%	3.5%
Average		3.4%	3.2%

== Awards and nominations ==
Year	Award	Category	Recipient	Result
2016	30th KBS Drama Awards	Excellence Award, Actress in a One-Act/Special/Short Drama	Cho Yeo-jeong	Won
