= I Need Romance 3 =

2014 South Korean television series

- Promotional poster
- Also known as: In Need of Romance 3
- Genre: Romance; Comedy; Drama
- Written by: Jung Hyun-jung
- Directed by: Jang Young-woo
- Starring: Kim So-yeon; Sung Joon; Namkoong Min; Wang Ji-won; Park Hyo-joo; Yoon Seung-ah; Park Yu-hwan
- Country of origin: South Korea
- Original language: Korean
- No. of episodes: 16

Production
- Executive producer: Kim Young-kyu
- Producers: Jo Moon-joo; Jung Se-ryung; Lee Esther
- Production company: JS Pictures

Original release
- Network: tvN
- Release: January 13 – March 4, 2014

Related
- I Need Romance; I Need Romance 2012

I Need Romance 3 (Korean: 로맨스가 필요해 3; RR: Romaenseuga piryohae 3) is a 2014 South Korean television series starring Kim So-yeon, Sung Joon, Namkoong Min, Wang Ji-won, Park Hyo-joo, Yoon Seung-ah and Park Yu-hwan. It aired on cable channel tvN from January 13 to March 4, 2014, on Mondays and Tuesdays at 22:00 (KST) for 16 episodes.

This is the third installment of tvN's romantic comedy franchise following the popularity of I Need Romance and I Need Romance 2012. Like its predecessors, the series realistically depicts the friendships, workplace rivalries, and love lives of three career women in their thirties, this time set at a home shopping channel company.

== Synopsis ==
Shin Joo-yeon is a 33-year-old fashion marketing director at a home shopping channel company. She's developed a tough prickly outer shell in order to succeed in the workplace, and has almost given up on the idea of true love after countless failures in the relationship department. She becomes involved in a love triangle with two very different men.

Joo Wan is a 26-year-old songwriter and carefree spirit who returns to Korea after seventeen years living abroad. Up until the age of 9, he was practically raised by his mom's friend and her daughter, Shin Joo-yeon. She only remembers him as a kid she was forced to play with when her mom was busy, while all his early memories from bath time, to play time, to learning how to tie his shoes, include her. Upon meeting again, he aims to heal Joo-yeon's jaded sense of romance.

Kang Tae-yoon is Joo-yeon's senior colleague and mentor, a workaholic perfectionist who does whatever it takes to meet his goals. He's smooth and refined, but inwardly he doesn't really believe in love after getting his heart broken by his last girlfriend.

Oh Se-ryung is a model-turned-stylist who is Joo-yeon's constant rival at work. She's uninhibited, honest, and always true to her emotions. Though Se-ryung has a line of guys waiting to date her since her school days, Tae-yoon is the only man she's genuinely fallen for, and she'll do anything to get him back.

Lee Min-jung, Jung Hee-jae and Lee Woo-young are Joo-yeon's best friends and office mates. Min-jung prefers casual, no-strings-attached hook-ups, so she's thrown for a loop when her usual sex partner Ahn Min-seok unknowingly moves into the apartment next door and she finds out that she's pregnant with his child. Hee-jae's longtime boyfriend is studying for the civil service exam, but her scrimping and saving for their future is beginning to take its toll on their relationship. Despite being the only male in their circle of friends, Woo-young is considered one of the girls since he was raised by a strong-willed mother and several older sisters; he's always there for Hee-jae and tries to get her to try new things and loosen up.

== Cast ==
- Kim So-yeon as Shin Joo-yeon
  - Chae Bin as teen Joo-yeon
  - Jung Da-bin as young Joo-yeon
- Sung Joon as Joo Wan
  - Jung Yoon-seok as young Joo Wan
- Namkoong Min as Kang Tae-yoon
- Wang Ji-won as Oh Se-ryung
- Park Hyo-joo as Lee Min-jung
- Yoon Seung-ah as Jung Hee-jae
- Park Yu-hwan as Lee Woo-young
- Yoo Ha-jun as Ahn Min-seok
- Jung Woo-shik as Han Ji-seung
- Im Soo-hyun as Se-ryung's assistant
- Alex Chu as PD Lee Jung-ho, Joo-yeon's boyfriend (cameo, ep. 1–3)
- John Park as Joo-yeon's 1st ex-boyfriend (cameo, ep. 1–2)
- Joo Sang-wook as Joo-yeon's 2nd ex-boyfriend (cameo, ep. 1)
- Jung Myung-hoon as Joo-yeon's 3rd ex-boyfriend (ep. 1)
- Kim Ji-seok as dog owner (cameo, ep. 3)
- Park Seung-gun as Joo-yeon and Se-ryung's business partner (ep. 5)
- Youngbin as himself (ep. 8 & 11)
- Han Hye-yeon as herself (ep. 10)
- Jang Min-young as himself (ep. 10)
- Kim Na-young as fashion designer (ep. 11)
- Kim Min-jae as idol trainee

== Awards and nominations ==
Year	Award	Category	Nominee	Result
2016	tvN10 Awards	Romantic-Comedy King	Sung Joon	Nominated
