= Left-Handed Wife =

2019 South Korean television series

- Promotional poster
- Also known as: Lefty Wife
- Hangul: 왼손잡이 아내
- RR: Oensonjabi anae
- MR: Oensonjabi anae
- Genre: Melodrama
- Written by: Moon Eun-ah
- Directed by: Kim Myeong-wook
- Starring: Lee Soo-kyung; Kim Jin-woo
- Country of origin: South Korea
- Original language: Korean
- No. of episodes: 103 (Note: Originally scheduled to air for 100 episodes, the series was extended by three episodes, as the series premiered on a Wednesday.)

Production
- Executive producer: Kim Hee-yeol
- Camera setup: Single camera
- Running time: 35 minutes
- Production company: Pan Entertainment
- Budget: ₩4 billion

Original release
- Network: KBS2
- Release: January 2 – May 31, 2019

Left-Handed Wife (Korean: 왼손잡이 아내; RR: Oensonjabi anae) is a 2019 South Korean television series starring Lee Soo-kyung and Kim Jin-woo. It aired from January 2 to May 31, 2019 on KBS2. It is also the first KBS daily drama not to premiere on a Monday.

== Cast ==
=== Main ===
- Lee Soo-kyung as Oh San-ha

An employee at the product development division of a cosmetics company.

- Kim Jin-woo as Park Do-kyung: Heir apparent of the Aura Group. Esther Jang's boyfriend.
- Song Won-seok as Lee Soo-ho: A doctor working as a resident in a hospital's emergency department. San-ha's husband.
- Jin Tae-hyun as Kim Nam-joon

An associate to Aura Group's chairman.

- Ha Yeon-joo as Esther Jang

A curator at the Aura Museum (a subsidiary of Aura Group).

=== Supporting ===
==== People around San-ha ====
- Kang Nam-gil as Oh Chang-soo, San-ha and Seul-ha's dad who went blind in the beginning of the series.
- Kim Seo-ra as Baek Geum-hee, San-ha and Seul-ha's mom.
- Park Yoo-na as Oh Seul-ha, Oh San-ha's younger sister.
- Lee Si-hoo as Bong Sun-dal

=== People around Do-kyung ===
- Kim Byung-ki as Park Sun-tae

Aura Group's chairman and Do-kyung's grandfather.

- Sunwoo Yong-nyeo as Cheon Sun-im

Do-kyung & Soo-ho's grandmother

- Jung Chan as Park Kang-chul

Aura's vice chairman and Do-kyung's father & Soo-ho's paternal uncle

- Lee Seung-yeon as Cho Ae-ra

Director of Aura Museum, Do-kyung and Nam-joon's mom, Kang-chul's wife whom he later divorced.

- Kim Joon-eui as Park Noah

Do-kyung and Esther's son out of wedlock.

== International broadcast ==
In Vietnam, the series was broadcast on VTV3 from January 7, 2020 under the title Hoán đổi số phận.

== Ratings ==
In this table, the blue numbers represent the lowest ratings and the red numbers represent the highest ratings.

Ep.	Original broadcast date	Average audience share		
Ep.	Original broadcast date	TNmS	AGB Nielsen	
Ep.	Original broadcast date	Nationwide	Nationwide	Seoul
1	January 2, 2019	15.7%	12.5% (3rd)	11.5% (5th)
2	January 3, 2019	16.9%	13.1% (4th)	11.4% (6th)
3	January 4, 2019	16.2%	13.0% (4th)	11.0% (9th)
4	January 7, 2019	16.8%	13.5% (2nd)	11.6% (3rd)
5	January 8, 2019	16.8%	13.5% (3rd)	12.0% (3rd)
6	January 9, 2019	16.7%	12.8% (5th)	11.0% (6th)
7	January 10, 2019	16.8%	13.7% (3rd)	12.4% (5th)
8	January 11, 2019	16.9%	13.1% (4th)	10.9% (6th)
9	January 14, 2019	16.3%	13.0% (3rd)	11.3% (3rd)
10	January 15, 2019	17.2%	13.7% (3rd)	11.5% (3rd)
11	January 16, 2019	16.1%	13.1% (2nd)	11.6% (3rd)
12	January 17, 2019	17.2%	13.4% (3rd)	11.6% (4th)
13	January 18, 2019	17.3%	12.9% (3rd)	11.2% (5th)
14	January 21, 2019	18.9%	13.8% (2nd)	12.2% (2nd)
15	January 22, 2019	18.1%	14.0% (3rd)	11.6% (3rd)
16	January 23, 2019	17.1%	13.2% (4th)	11.0% (5th)
17	January 24, 2019	16.6%	13.7% (3rd)	11.9% (4th)
18	January 25, 2019	16.8%	13.5% (3rd)	11.6% (4th)
19	January 28, 2019	18.5%	13.6% (3rd)	11.7% (3rd)
20	January 29, 2019	18.6%	14.3% (2nd)	12.8% (2nd)
21	January 30, 2019	17.6%	13.1% (4th)	11.2% (4th)
22	January 31, 2019	18.3%	13.3% (4th)	10.9% (5th)
23	February 1, 2019	16.7%	13.9% (3rd)	11.7% (4th)
24	February 6, 2019 (Note: No episodes were aired on February 4 due to the broadcast of the movie Captain America: Civil War, and on February 5 due to the broadcast of the movie Zootopia.)	14.0%	11.1% (5th)	9.9% (4th)
25	February 7, 2019	17.5%	14.3% (3rd)	12.6% (5th)
26	February 8, 2019	17.4%	13.3% (5th)	10.7% (8th)
27	February 11, 2019	16.9%	14.5% (2nd)	13.0% (2nd)
28	February 12, 2019	17.7%	14.8% (2nd)	13.1% (2nd)
29	February 13, 2019	18.6%	13.9% (2nd)	11.2% (4th)
30	February 14, 2019	17.5%	13.8% (4th)	11.9% (7th)
31	February 15, 2019	17.4%	11.6% (5th)	13.5% (7th)
32	February 18, 2019	18.8%	14.0% (2nd)	12.4% (2nd)
33	February 19, 2019	19.4%	14.8% (2nd)	12.9% (2nd)
34	February 20, 2019	20.4%	13.9% (2nd)	11.7% (4th)
35	February 21, 2019	18.0%	14.2% (4th)	12.3% (6th)
36	February 22, 2019	19.6%	14.9% (3rd)	13.1% (4th)
37	February 25, 2019	19.8%	14.8% (2nd)	12.9% (2nd)
38	February 26, 2019	18.2%	14.9% (2nd)	12.9% (3rd)
39	February 27, 2019	18.3%	14.3% (2nd)	12.4% (3rd)
40	March 1, 2019 (Note: No episode was aired on February 28 due to the broadcast of a special 100 Years of Spring.)	18.6%	14.1% (3rd)	12.6% (4th)
41	March 4, 2019	20.4%	15.9% (2nd)	14.0% (2nd)
42	March 5, 2019	21.0%	15.9% (2nd)	13.0% (2nd)
43	March 6, 2019	21.1%	15.6% (3rd)	14.0% (4th)
44	March 7, 2019	21.5%	15.9% (4th)	13.5% (4th)
45	March 8, 2019	21.2%	15.6% (3rd)	13.9% (5th)
46	March 11, 2019	20.8%	15.8% (2nd)	13.3% (3rd)
47	March 12, 2019	21.5%	16.3% (2nd)	13.6% (2nd)
48	March 13, 2019	21.6%	15.9% (4th)	13.5% (4th)
49	March 14, 2019	20.6%	15.7% (4th)	13.5% (4th)
50	March 15, 2019	21.1%	15.9% (3rd)	13.6% (4th)
51	March 18, 2019	20.6%	15.1% (2nd)	13.0% (2nd)
52	March 19, 2019	20.8%	15.9% (2nd)	14.0% (2nd)
53	March 20, 2019	20.2%	15.7% (2nd)	13.3% (2nd)
54	March 21, 2019	19.6%	15.5% (2nd)	13.3% (3rd)
55	March 25, 2019 (Note: No episode was aired on March 22 due to a football match between Bolivia and South Korea.)	20.7%	15.7% (2nd)	14.1% (2nd)
56	March 26, 2019	19.4%	14.3% (2nd)	11.9% (3rd)
57	March 27, 2019	19.7%	15.3% (2nd)	13.9% (3rd)
58	March 28, 2019	19.1%	15.6% (2nd)	14.3% (3rd)
59	March 29, 2019	18.8%	14.7% (4th)	12.6% (5th)
60	April 1, 2019	19.2%	15.9% (2nd)	13.6% (2nd)
61	April 2, 2019	19.6%	15.5% (2nd)	13.4% (2nd)
62	April 3, 2019	19.7%	15.4% (2nd)	13.6% (3rd)
63	April 4, 2019	19.2%	16.0% (2nd)	14.2% (4th)
64	April 5, 2019	18.8%	14.4% (4th)	12.5% (5th)
65	April 8, 2019	19.3%	15.2% (3rd)	13.1% (3rd)
66	April 9, 2019	20.1%	17.1% (2nd)	15.7% (2nd)
67	April 10, 2019	19.8%	15.5% (2nd)	13.3% (3rd)
68	April 11, 2019	16.7%	13.9% (3rd)	12.4% (4th)
69	April 12, 2019	18.7%	14.2% (4th)	12.8% (5th)
70	April 15, 2019	18.4%	14.5% (2nd)	12.9% (2nd)
71	April 16, 2019	19.8%	15.2% (2nd)	13.6% (2nd)
72	April 17, 2019	18.5%	15.0% (2nd)	12.8% (4th)
73	April 18, 2019	18.7%	14.1% (3rd)	12.0% (4th)
74	April 19, 2019	17.5%	13.0% (4th)	10.5% (7th)
75	April 22, 2019	18.9%	14.2% (2nd)	12.5% (2nd)
76	April 23, 2019	20.7%	16.7% (2nd)	14.6% (2nd)
77	April 24, 2019	19.9%	15.0% (2nd)	13.0% (4th)
78	April 25, 2019	22.5%	16.6% (2nd)	15.2% (2nd)
79	April 26, 2019	20.7%	15.8% (2nd)	13.9% (2nd)
80	April 29, 2019	21.1%	16.4% (2nd)	14.5% (2nd)
81	April 30, 2019	20.9%	15.5% (1st)	13.3% (2nd)
82	May 1, 2019	20.3%	14.8% (2nd)	12.6% (4th)
83	May 2, 2019	21.1%	15.3% (2nd)	13.9% (2nd)
84	May 3, 2019	18.5%	14.7% (2nd)	12.9% (2nd)
85	May 7, 2019 (Note: No episode was aired on May 6 due to the broadcast of Mr. House Husband.)	18.8%	14.9% (2nd)	13.1% (2nd)
86	May 8, 2019	17.0%	13.4% (3rd)	11.8% (3rd)
87	May 9, 2019	17.5%	13.0% (2nd)	11.2% (3rd)
88	May 10, 2019	18.8%	14.3% (2nd)	12.4% (2nd)
89	May 13, 2019	18.0%	15.6% (2nd)	14.3% (2nd)
90	May 14, 2019	20.1%	14.3% (2nd)	13.0% (2nd)
91	May 15, 2019	18.6%	14.0% (3rd)	11.7% (4th)
92	May 16, 2019	18.2%	14.7% (2nd)	13.2% (1st)
93	May 17, 2019	19.4%	15.3% (1st)	13.9% (1st)
94	May 20, 2019	20.1%	15.6% (1st)	13.8% (1st)
95	May 21, 2019	21.1%	13.9% (2nd)	12.5% (2nd)
96	May 22, 2019	18.6%	14.5% (2nd)	13.4% (1st)
97	May 23, 2019	18.9%	14.1% (2nd)	12.5% (2nd)
98	May 24, 2019	18.1%	14.0% (1st)	12.6% (1st)
99	May 27, 2019	20.9%	16.1% (2nd)	14.2% (2nd)
100	May 28, 2019	19.0%	15.2% (1st)	13.7% (1st)
101	May 29, 2019	19.5%	14.4% (2nd)	12.5% (2nd)
102	May 30, 2019	18.6%	15.1% (1st)	14.1% (1st)
103	May 31, 2019	19.4%	15.8% (1st)	13.5% (2nd)
Average		18.9%	14.6%	12.7%
