= Cul-de-sac (disambiguation) =

A cul-de-sac is a dead end street with only one and the same inlet and outlet.

Cul-de-sac or cul de sac or culdesac may also refer to:

== Places ==
- Culdesac, Idaho, a small city in the United States
- Cul-de-Sac, Saint Martin, a town on the Caribbean island of Saint Martin
- Culdesac Tempe, a planned community in Tempe, Arizona

== Arts, entertainment, and media ==
=== Films ===
- Cul-de-sac (1966 film), a British film directed by Roman Polanski
- Cul-de-sac (2004 film), a Hong Kong television film starring Steven Ma
- Cul-de-sac (2010 film), a British film directed by Ramin Goudarzinejad and Mahshad Torkan
- Cul-de-sac, a 2016 short film directed by Damon Russell

=== Literature ===
- Cul de Sac (comic strip), by Richard Thompson
- Cul-de-sac (play), a play by John Cariani
- Cul-de-Sac, Yves Thériault
- The Cul-de-Sac Kids, a series of children's books

=== Music ===
- Cul de Sac (band), a rock band from Boston, Massachusetts
- Cul de Sac (song), a 1974 song by Van Morrison
- Cul-De-Sac (album), a 2003 album by V Shape Mind
- "Cul-de-sac", a 1980 song by Genesis from the album Duke
- "Cul-de-sac", a 2024 song by Glass Beach from the album Plastic Death
- "Cul de sac", a 2001 song by Tomahawk from the album Tomahawk
- "Cul-de-Sac", a song by The Wonder Years from the album The Greatest Generation
- Culdesac (mixtape), a 2010 mixtape by Childish Gambino

== See also ==
- Dead end (disambiguation)
- Recto-uterine pouch, an anatomical location between the rectum and uterus, sometimes traditionally called the "cul-de-sac"
