= Jung Chan =

South Korean actor (born 1971)

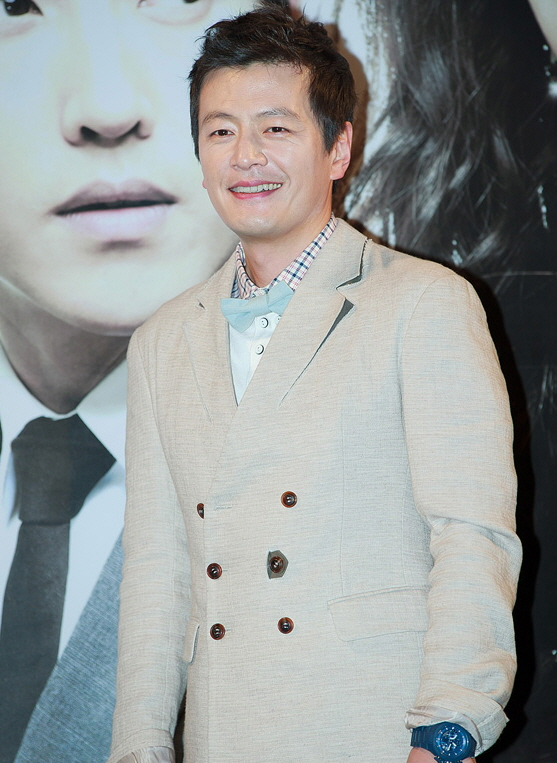
- Born: February 23, 1971 (age 55); South Korea
- Education: Kyungwoon University - Martial Arts
- Occupation: Actor
- Years active: 1994–present
- Spouse: Kim (m. 2012; div. 2015)

Korean name
- Hangul: 정찬
- Hanja: 鄭燦
- RR: Jeong Chan
- MR: Chŏng Ch'an

Jung Chan (Korean: 정찬; born February 23, 1971) is a South Korean actor.

== Filmography ==
=== Film ===
- The Young Man (1994)
- Extras (1998)
- Over the Rainbow (2002)
- Road Movie (2002)
- Invisible Light (2003)
- Spring Breeze (2003)
- How to Keep My Love (2004) (cameo)
- Possible Changes (2005)
- Woman on the Beach (2006) (cameo)
- The Cut (2007)
- My New Partner (2008) (cameo)
- Loveholic (2010)
- Bomini (short film, 2010)
- Link (2011)
- Wi-do (2011)
- The Concubine (2012)
- Superstar (2012)

=== Television series ===
- TV City (MBC, 1995)
- Woman (MBC, 1995)
- Papa (KBS2, 1996)
- August Bride (SBS, 1996)
- Halt (KBS2, 1996)
- The Angel Within (KBS2, 1997)
- Tears of Roses (SBS, 1997)
- New York Story (SBS, 1997)
- MBC Best Theater – "Love in May" (MBC, 1998)
- Partner (SBS, 1998)
- My Love By My Side (KBS1, 1998)
- Sunday Best – "Tollgate" (KBS1, 1999)
- Sunday Best – "The Wind Blows in Yeouido" (KBS1, 1999)
- Queen (SBS, 1999)
- MBC Best Theater – "A Day on Earth" (MBC, 1999)
- School 2 (KBS2, 1999) (guest, ep 20)
- Morning of the World (SBS, 2000)
- Feel So Good (MBC, 2000)
- Money.com (SBS, 2000)
- Soonja (SBS, 2001)
- Scent of Man (MBC, 2003)
- Long Live Love (SBS, 2003)
- A Saint and a Witch (MBC, 2003)
- Sweet Buns (MBC, 2004)
- Father of the Ocean (MBC, 2004)
- Toji, the Land (SBS, 2004)
- That Summer's Typhoon (SBS, 2005)
- Golden Apple (KBS2, 2005)
- HDTV Literature – "Saya Saya (Bird, Bird)" (KBS1, 2005)
- How Much Love (MBC, 2006)
- Lovers (2006)
- Auction House (MBC, 2007)
- New Heart (MBC, 2007) (guest, ep 12)
- Life Special Investigation Team (MBC, 2008) (guest, ep 11-12)
- Daughter-in-Law (SBS, 2008)
- East of Eden (MBC, 2008) (cameo)
- Family's Honor (SBS, 2008)
- The Sweet Thief (OBS, 2009)
- You're Beautiful (SBS, 2009)
- Blossom Sisters (MBC, 2010)
- My Sister's March (MBC, 2010)
- Personal Taste (MBC, 2010) (cameo, ep 2)
- Stormy Lovers (MBC, 2010)
- Smile, Mom (SBS, 2010)
- The Duo (MBC, 2011)
- Ice Adonis (tvN, 2012)
- The King of Dramas (SBS, 2012) (cameo, ep 15-16)
- Here Comes Mr. Oh (MBC, 2012)
- Blue Tower (tvN, 2013) (cameo)
- Master's Sun (SBS, 2013) (guest, ep 9)
- The King's Daughter, Soo Baek-hyang (MBC, 2013-2014)
- 12 Years Promise (jTBC, 2014)
- Pride and Prejudice (MBC, 2014)
- Lady of the Storm (MBC, 2014)
- Entertainer (SBS, 2016) (cameo, ep 17-18)
- Our Gap-soon (SBS, 2016–2017)
- My Contracted Husband, Mr. Oh (MBC, 2018)
- Left-Handed Wife (KBS2, 2019)
- The Two Sisters (2024)

=== Variety show ===
- Young Entrepreneur Audition – Brain Big Bang (EBS, 2011)
- Road Docu: Tasty Travels (MBN, 2012)
- Adrenaline: Burn Out (Insite TV, 2013)

== Awards ==
- 1996 SBS Drama Awards: Popularity Award
