= I Need Romance =

2011 South Korean television series

- Promotional poster
- Also known as: In Need of Romance
- Genre: Romance; Comedy; Drama
- Written by: Jung Hyun-jung
- Directed by: Lee Chang-han
- Starring: Cho Yeo-jeong; Kim Jeong-hoon; Choi Yeo-jin; Choi Song-hyun; Choi Jin-hyuk
- Country of origin: South Korea
- Original language: Korean
- No. of episodes: 16

Production
- Production company: JS Pictures

Original release
- Network: tvN
- Release: June 13 – August 2, 2011

Related
- I Need Romance 2012; I Need Romance 3

I Need Romance (Korean: 로맨스가 필요해; RR: Romaenseuga piryohae) is a 2011 South Korean romantic comedy series starring Cho Yeo-jeong, Kim Jeong-hoon, Choi Yeo-jin, Choi Song-hyun and Choi Jin-hyuk. It aired on tvN from June 13 to August 2, 2011, on Mondays and Tuesdays at 23:00 (KST) for 16 episodes.

The cable drama revolves around three thirty-something career women and their complicated love lives. It was popular with female viewers in their 20s and 30s for depicting contemporary women in a realistic way.

== Synopsis ==
Funny, romantic, and just a little racy, I Need Romance follows the Sex and the City-like adventures of three thirty-something best friends looking for love in modern-day Seoul.

== Cast ==
- Cho Yeo-jeong as Sunwoo In-young
- Kim Jeong-hoon as Kim Sung-soo
- Choi Yeo-jin as Park Seo-yeon
- Choi Song-hyun as Kang Hyun-joo
- Choi Jin-hyuk as Bae Sung-hyun
- Ha Yeon-joo as Yoon Kang-hee
- Kim Hyung-min as Kim Deok-soo
- Ricky Kim as Alex
- Lee Kwan-hoon as Seo Joon-yi
- Heo Tae-hee as Kim Tae-woo
- Jung Yoo-chan as Man at the airport (cameo, ep. 4)
- Lee Da-hee as Lee Min-jung (cameo, ep. 16)
- Park Woo-chun as Jung Hae-woon (cameo, ep. 16)
- Kim So-yeon as young Sung-soo's girlfriend (cameo, ep. 16)

== Spin-off ==
Currently, there are two spin-offs, I Need Romance 2012 (2012) and I Need Romance 3 (2014).
