= Goodbye Mr. Black =

2016 South Korean television series

- Promotional poster
- Genre: Thriller; Drama; Romance
- Based on: Goodbye Mr. Black by Hwang Mi-na
- Written by: Moon Hee-jung
- Directed by: Han Hee; Kim Seong-wook
- Starring: Lee Jin-wook; Moon Chae-won; Yoo In-young; Kim Kang-woo; Song Jae-rim
- Music by: Lee im-woo
- Country of origin: South Korea
- Original language: Korean
- No. of episodes: 20

Production
- Executive producer: Kim Do-hoon
- Producer: Cho Yoon-jung
- Running time: 70 minutes
- Production company: Victory Contents

Original release
- Network: MBCTV
- Release: March 16 – May 19, 2016

Goodbye Mr. Black (Korean: 굿바이 미스터 블랙; RR: Gutbai miseuteo beullaek) is a 2016 South Korean television series based on the manhwa of the same title, created with The Count of Monte Cristo motif, written by Hwang Mi-na and published in 1983. It aired on MBC on Wednesdays and Thursdays at 21:55 (KST) from March 16, 2016, to May 19, 2016, for 20 episodes.

== Plot ==
Cha Ji-won is a Navy SEAL demolitions officer, but he is betrayed by his best friend, then denounced as a traitor. Ji-won is sent to another country, but escapes and returns with a new identity, along with a "fake" wife, to take revenge.

== Cast ==
=== Main characters ===
- Lee Jin-wook as Cha Ji-won / Black
  - Lee Hee-seong as child Cha Ji-won
- Moon Chae-won as Kim Swan / Khaya / Baek Eun-young
  - Lee Chae-yoon as child Kim Swan (Baek Eun-young)
- Kim Kang-woo as Min Seon-jae
  - Jeong Jae-hyuk as child Min Seon-jae
- Song Jae-rim as Seo Woo-jin
- Yoo In-young as Yoon Ma-ri

=== Supporting characters ===
People around Cha Ji-won

- Lee Won-jong as Go Sung-min
- Im Se-mi as Cha Ji-soo
  - Kwon Ji-min as child Cha Ji-soo
- Ha Yeon-joo as Mei
- Bae Yoo-ram as Ahn Gye-dong

People around Kim Swan

- Kim Tae-woo as Kim Ji-ryoon
- Jung Hye-sun as Jeong Hyun-sook

People around Min Seon-jae

- Jeon Gook-hwan as Baek Eun-do (Jo Seong-bae)
- Choi Jung-woo as Seo Jin-tak
- Lee Dae-yeon as Min Yong-jae
- Kim Myung-gook as director Nam Seong-woo
- Seo Beom-sik as general manager Park Beom-sik (Baek Eun-do's secretary)

Extended cast

- Gil Hae-yeon as Hong In-ja
- Wi Ha-joon as Ha-joon
- Lee Jae-woo as Jae-woo
- Park Jeong-yoon as Se-yang
- In Seong-ho
- Choi Hyun as general manager Choi
- Kim Kwang-sik
- Ha Soo-ho
- Gong Jeong-hwan as inspector Kim Seong-min
- Go Seo-hee
- Wi Yang-ho
- Jung Dong-gyu
- Kim Kwang-hyun as Park Seok-min
- Ki Se-hyung as killer

=== Cameo appearances ===
- Jung Dong-hwan as Cha Jae-wan
- Lee Jae-yong as Yoon Jae-min
- Jo Yoon-ho
- Daniel Joey Albright as Top Investor Fred in episode 8

== Ratings ==
In the table below, the blue numbers represent the lowest ratings and the red numbers represent the highest ratings.

Episode #	Original broadcast date	Average audience share			
Episode #	Original broadcast date	TNmS Ratings		AGB Nielsen	
Episode #	Original broadcast date	Nationwide	Seoul National Capital Area	Nationwide	Seoul National Capital Area
1	March 16, 2016	3.6%	3.7%	3.9%	4.2%
2	March 17, 2016	4.2%	4.4%	3.9%	4.2%
3	March 23, 2016	4.2%	4.7%	3.6%	4.2%
4	March 24, 2016	4.4%	4.4%	4.5%	5.1%
5	March 30, 2016	5.4%	7.4%	5.1%	6.0%
6	March 31, 2016	4.6%	—	4.6%	5.4%
7	April 6, 2016	4.7%	5.4%	4.6%	5.4%
8	April 7, 2016	4.5%	4.5%	3.4%	4.2%
9	April 14, 2016	3.6%	—	3.5%	4.0%
10	April 14, 2016	3.2%	—	3.8%	4.4%
11	April 20, 2016	7.5%	8.3%	8.1%	9.0%
12	April 21, 2016	8.8%	9.2%	9.4%	10.5%
13	April 27, 2016	8.1%	8.9%	8.7%	10.2%
14	April 28, 2016	8.7%	9.1%	8.7%	9.6%
15	May 4, 2016	8.7%	8.9%	9.1%	9.8%
16	May 5, 2016	8.7%	9.3%	9.0%	9.5%
17	May 11, 2016	10.4%	10.9%	9.5%	10.8%
18	May 12, 2016	8.9%	9.7%	8.6%	9.7%
19	May 18, 2016	8.9%	9.4%	8.5%	8.3%
20	May 19, 2016	10.2%	11.1%	9.9%	10.7%
Average		6.6%	7.6%	6.5%	7.3%

== Original soundtrack ==
Goodbye Mr. Black : Original Soundtrack

Soundtrack album by Various Artists
- Released: May 19, 2016
- Genres: Pop, K-pop, soundtrack
- Label: LOEN Entertainment

No.	Title	Artist	Length
1.	"여명의 협주곡" (The Dawn Concerto)	Various Artists
2.	"그렇게 안녕" (Goodbye)	Baek Ji Young
3.	"제자리 걸음" (Standstill)	Bae Soo Jung (배수정)
4.	"아마도 이건" (Perhaps This is)	Song Yoo Bin (송유빈)
5.	"참아" (Bear)	2BiC
6.	"남자의 고독 – 지원 테마" (A Man Solitude – Cha Jiwon Theme)	Various Artists
7.	"선재 테마" (Min Seon Jae Theme)	Various Artists
8.	"Deep Breath"	Various Artists
9.	"사건의 시작" (Case Start)	Various Artists
10.	"Countdown"	Various Artists
11.	"Pressure"	Various Artists
