= Choi Song-hyun =

South Korean actress (born 1982)

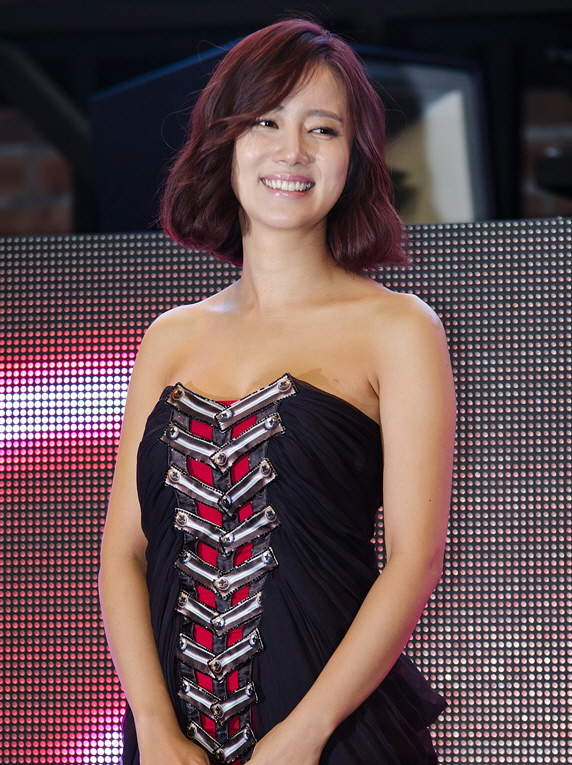
- Choi in 2011
- Born: April 11, 1982 (age 44); Seoul, South Korea
- Education: Yonsei University - Journalism; Korea University Graduate School of Mass Communication - Master's degree in Journalism
- Occupations: Actress; announcer
- Years active: 2006–present
- Agent(s): Signal Entertainment Group (2016–present)

Korean name
- Hangul: 최송현
- RR: Choe Songhyeon
- MR: Ch'oe Songhyŏn

Choi Song-hyun (Korean: 최송현; born April 11, 1982) is a South Korean actress. She began her television career as a KBS announcer in 2006, then she resigned from the network in 2008 to focus on acting. She has since starred in films and television dramas such as Insadong Scandal (2009), Mrs. Town (2009), Prosecutor Princess (2010), and I Need Romance (2011).

== Filmography ==
=== Film ===
Year	Title	Role	Notes	Ref.
2009	Insadong Scandal	Gong Soo-jung		
2009	Girlfriends	Soo-kyung	Cameo	
2010	Midnight FM	Radio scriptwriter Park Kyung-yang		
2012	Young Gun in the Time	Song-hyun		

=== Television series ===
Year	Title	Role	Notes	Ref.
2008	Gourmet	Cooking contest MC		
2009	Smile, You	Hong Sun-woo		
2009	Mrs. Town	Jackie Jung		
2010	Prosecutor Princess	Jin Jeong-seon		
2010	Becoming a Billionaire	Choi Seok-bong's mother	Cameo	
2010	The President	Na Joo-ri		
2011	I Need Romance	Kang Hyun-joo		
2012	Can't Live Without You	Kim Do-hee		
2012	I Need Romance 2012	Kang Hyun-joo	Cameo	
2013	Special Affairs Team TEN 2	Yoon Seo-hyun	Cameo (Episode 9)	
2013	Potato Star 2013QR3	Noh Bo-young		
2014	Mama	Na Se-na		
2016	The Vampire Detective	Seo Seung-hee	Cameo (Episode 2)	
2016	On the Way to the Airport	Han Ji-eun		
2016	The Gentlemen of Wolgyesu Tailor Shop	Lee Yeon-hee	Cameo	
2017	Chicago Typewriter	MC		

=== Television shows ===
Year	Title	Role	Ref.
2007	Science Cafe	Host	
2007	Sang Sang Plus	Host	
2007	Open and It Is the World of Nursery Rhyme	Host	
2008	Campaign for a Good Nation	Host	
2010	Weekend N Cinema	Host	
2012	Miracle on 7th Street	Host	
2012	Exploration of Genders	Host	
2013	Korean Case Files No. 5	Host	

== Musical theatre ==
Year	Title	Role	Ref.
2010	Fly Boy		

== Awards and nominations ==
Award ceremony	Year	Category	Nominee / Work	Result	Ref.
KBS Entertainment Awards	2007	Best Newcomer (Female MC) in a Variety Show	Sang Sang Plus	Won	
