= JS Pictures =

South Korean production company

- JS Pictures logo
- Native name: 제이에스픽쳐스
- Type: Joint-stock company
- Industry: Production company
- Genre: Korean drama
- Founded: 1999
- Founder: Lee Jin-seok; Jung Se-ho
- Headquarters: 121, Wausan-ro, Seogyo-dong, Mapo District, Seoul, South Korea
- Number of locations: South Korea
- Key people: Lee Jin-seok (CEO and TV series director)
- Products: TV series
- Services: TV series production; Actor management
- Owner: CJ ENM (70%)
- Parent: CJ ENM Entertainment Division
- Website: jspictures.tv/en

JS Pictures (Korean: 제이에스픽쳐스) is a South Korean actor management and Korean drama production company, founded in 1999 by television directors and producers Lee Jin-seok and Jung Se-ho. It currently operates as a subsidiary of CJ ENM.

== Works ==
Year	Title	Original title	Network	Notes
2000	Medical Center	메디컬 센터	SBS TV	
2001	Wuri's Family	우리집	MBC TV	
2001	Four Sisters	네 자매 이야기	MBC TV	
2001	Piano	피아노	SBS TV	
2002	Let's Get Married	결혼합시다	KBS2	
2002	Rival	라이벌	SBS TV	
2002	My Love Patzzi	내 사랑 팥쥐	MBC TV	
2003	Land of Wine	술의 나라	SBS TV	
2003	She is Cool	그녀는 짱	KBS2	
2004	Say You Love Me	사랑한다 말해줘	MBC TV	
2004	Into the Storm	폭풍 속으로	SBS TV	
2004	War of the Roses	장미의 전쟁	MBC TV	
2004	My 19 Year Old Sister-in-Law	형수님은 열아홉	SBS TV	
2004	Love Story in Harvard	러브스토리 인 하버드	SBS TV	Co-produced with Logos Film
2005	Wonderful Life	원더풀 라이프	MBC TV	
2005	Golden Apple	황금사과	KBS2	
2006	Love Can't Wait	사랑은 아무도 못말려	MBC TV	
2006	101st Marriage Proposal	101번째 프러포즈	SBS TV	Co-produced with KN Entertainment
2006	Love Me When You Can	있을때 잘해	MBC TV	
2006	Cloud Stairs	구름계단	KBS2	
2006	My Love	마이 러브	SBS TV	
2007	Catch a Kang Nam Mother	강남엄마 따라잡기	SBS TV	
2007	Capital Scandal	경성 스캔들	KBS2	
2007	She Scared	그 여자가 무서워	SBS TV	
2007	New Heart	뉴하트	MBC TV	
2008	I Love You	사랑해	SBS TV	
2008	Gourmet	식객	SBS TV	
2008	Working Mom	워킹맘	SBS TV	co-produced with Rainbow Pictures
2009	Tae Hee, Hye Kyo, Ji Hyun	태희혜교지현이	MBC TV	
2009	Three Brothers	수상한 삼형제	KBS2	
2010	Golden House	위기일발 풍년빌라	TVN	
2010	OB & GY	산부인과	SBS TV	
2010	Giant	자이언트	SBS TV	
2011	Midas	마이더스	SBS TV	
2011	I Need Romance	로맨스가 필요해	tvN	
2011	Heartstrings	넌 내게 반했어	MBC TV	
2012	History of a Salaryman	샐러리맨 초한지	SBS TV	
2012	21st Century Family	21세기 가족	tvN	
2012	Tasty Life	맛있는 인생	SBS TV	
2012	I Need Romance 2012	로맨스가 필요해 2012	tvN	
2013	Incarnation of Money	돈의 화신	SBS TV	
2013	The Virus	더 바이러스	OCN	
2013	Nine	나인: 아홉 번의 시간여행	tvN	
2013	Crazy Love	미친사랑	tvN	
2013	Can't Stand Anymore	더 이상은 못 참아	JTBC	
2013	Two Weeks	투윅스	MBC TV	
2014	I Need Romance 3	로맨스가 필요해 3	tvN	
2014	A New Leaf	개과천선	MBC TV	
2014	Lovers of Music	트로트의 연인	KBS2	
2014	The Three Musketeers	삼총사	tvN	Co-produced with Chorokbaem Media
2014	Discovery of Love	연애의 발견	KBS2	
2015	Second 20s	두번째 스무살	tvN	Co-produced with AStory
2015	Ex-Girlfriends' Club	구여친클럽	tvN	
2015	Enchanting Neighbor	황홀한 이웃	SBS TV	
2016	Moorim School: Saga of the Brave	무림학교	KBS2	
2017	Strong Girl Bong-soon	힘쎈여자 도봉순	jtbc	Co-produced with Drama House and J Content Hub
2017	Return of Fortunate Bok	돌아온 복단지	MBC TV	Co-produced with AYIN Holdings
2017	The Lady in Dignity	품위있는 그녀	jtbc	Co-produced with Drama House and J Content Hub
2017	Avengers Social Club	부암동 복수자들	tvN	Co-produced with Studio Dragon
2017	A Korean Odyssey	화유기	tvN	Co-produced with Studio Dragon
2018	Drama Stage: Our Place's Tasty Soybean Paste	우리 집은 맛나 된장 맛나	tvN	Co-produced with Studio Dragon
2018	Tale of Fairy	계룡선녀전	tvN	Co-produced with Studio Dragon
2019	Spring Turns to Spring	봄이 오나 봄	MBC TV	
2019	He Is Psychometric	사이코메트리 그녀석	tvN	Co-produced with Studio Dragon
2019	One Spring Night	봄밤	MBC TV	
2019	Class of Lies	미스터 기간제	OCN	Co-produced with Studio Dragon
2020	Money Game	머니게임	tvN	Co-produced with Studio Dragon
2021	Mine	마인	tvN	Co-produced with Studio Dragon
2021	Bossam: Steal the Fate	보쌈-운명을 훔치다	MBN	Co-produced with EL Rise
2021	Chimera	키마이라	OCN	
2024	The Midnight Romance in Hagwon	졸업	tvN	Co-produced with Studio Dragon
TBA	Fall from the Sky	하늘에서 떨어진 폴	tvN	Co-produced with Studio Dragon

== Managed people ==
=== Actors ===
- Geum Chae-Ahn
- Yoon Hyun-min
- Lee Da-hae
- Yoon So-yi
- Ahn Woo-yeon
- So Hee-jung
- Yoon Jin-seul (former member of Jewelry)
- Park Eun-suk
- Park Seo-yeon
- Jo Sung-yoon
- Kim Bitnari
- Park Shin-woo

== Production crew ==
=== Producers ===
- Kim Do-hoon
- Kim Sang-ho
- Kim Byung-soo
- Kwon Seok-jang
- Kim Yoon-cheol
- Ahn Pan-seok
- Lee Min-woo
- Lee Jong-jae
- Lee Chang-han
- Lee Tae-gon
- Lee Jin-seok

=== Screenwriters ===
- Kim Hyun-hee
- Kim Jung-eun
- Ma Joo-hee
- Baek Mi-kyung
- Yang Jin-ah
- Lee Ji-hyo
- Lee Jin-mae
- Go Jung-won
- Jung Ha-na

== See also ==
- Studio Dragon - another drama production subsidiary of CJ ENM
