= Ha Yeon-joo =

South Korean actress (born 1987)

Ha Yeon-Joo
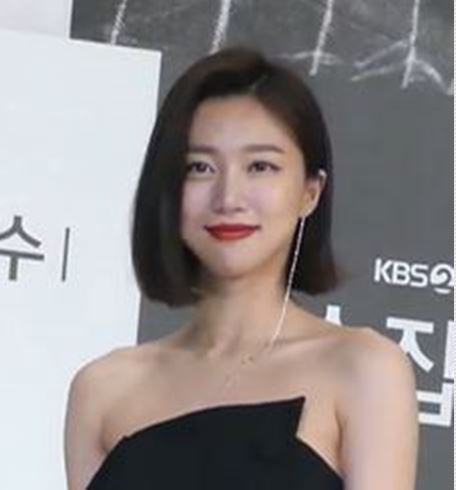
- Ha in 2018
- Born: August 6, 1987 (age 39); Seoul, South Korea
- Occupation: Actress
- Years active: 2008–present
- Agent: Huayi Brothers
- Spouse: Simon Seo-jun Kim (m. 2021)

Korean name
- Hangul: 하연주
- RR: Ha Yeonju
- MR: Ha Yŏnju

Ha Yeon-joo (Korean: 하연주; born August 6, 1987) is a South Korean actress. She is also a member of Mensa International.

== Personal life ==
Ha married a then-unnamed businessman on June 20, 2021.

On August 5, 2025, Ha revealed her husband's face in the photos posted on her social media account commemorating their marriage. It was eventually revealed that her husband is Simon Seo-jun Kim, the CEO of Hashed Ventures, a major South Korean blockchain and cryptocurrency investment company.

== Filmography ==
=== Film ===
Year	Title	Role	Ref.
2009	Me, Neither (short film)	Oh Eun-Seo	
2010	The Rhythm of Chopsticks	Ji-Sook	
2014	Miss Granny	Soo-Yeon	
2015	The File	Shin Mi-Soo	

=== Television series ===
Year	Title	Role	Ref.
2008	Here He Comes	Lee Jae-sook	
2010	Gloria	Yoo Mi-na	
2011	Royal Family	Ji-eun	
2011	I Need Romance	Yoon Kang-hee	
2012	Ugly Miss Young-ae 10	Ha Yeon-joo	
2012	I Need Romance 2012	Yoon Kang-Hee (cameo)	
2013	A Tale Of Two Sisters	Han Ki-eun	
2013	Dating Agency: Cyrano	Hye-ri	
2013–14	Miss Korea	Shin Sun-young	
2014	It's Okay, That's Love	Hyun-joo	
2014	My Secret Hotel	Jung Soo-ah	
2015	Iron Lady Cha	Lee Yoon-hee	
2015	Cheo Yong (Season 2)	Jung Ha-yoon	
2016	Goodbye Mr. Black	Mei	
2016	Entourage	Herself (ep.14)	
2016–17	Person Who Gives Happiness	Kim Ja-kyung	
2019	Left-Handed Wife	Esther Jang	
2024	The Two Sisters	Lee Hye-ji / Bae Do-eun	

=== Television shows ===
Year	Title	Role	Ref.
2009–10	Inkigayo	Host	
2009	Roller Coaster	Cast member	
2014	The Genius: Black Garnet	Cast member	
