= Woman of 9.9 Billion =

2019 South Korean television series

- Promotional poster
- Hangul: 99억의 여자
- Hanja: 99億의 女子
- RR: 99eogui yeoja
- MR: 99ŏgŭi yŏja
- Genre: Drama; Thriller
- Written by: Han Ji-hoon
- Directed by: Kim Yeong-jo
- Starring: Cho Yeo-jeong; Kim Kang-woo; Jung Woong-in; Oh Na-ra; Lee Ji-hoon
- Music by: Lee Chang-hee
- Country of origin: South Korea
- Original language: Korean
- No. of episodes: 32 (Note: In order to circumvent Korean laws that prevent commercial breaks in the middle of an episode, what would previously have been aired as single 70 minute episodes are now being repackaged as two 35 minute episodes, with two episodes being shown each night with a commercial break between the two.)

Production
- Producer: Cho Yoon-jung
- Camera setup: Single-camera
- Running time: 35 minutes
- Production company: Victory Contents

Original release
- Network: KBS2
- Release: December 4, 2019 – January 23, 2020

Woman of 9.9 Billion (Korean: 99억의 여자; RR: 99eogui yeoja) is a 2019 South Korean television series starring Cho Yeo-jeong, Kim Kang-woo, Jung Woong-in, Oh Na-ra and Lee Ji-hoon. It aired on KBS2's Wednesdays and Thursdays at 22:00 (KST) from December 4, 2019 to January 23, 2020.

== Synopsis ==
The story of an unfortunate woman named Jeong Seo-yeon who finds herself with 9.9 billion won.

== Cast ==
=== Main ===
- Cho Yeo-jeong as Jeong Seo-yeon
- Kim Kang-woo as Kang Tae-woo
- Jung Woong-in as Hong In-pyo
- Oh Na-ra as Yoon Hee-joo
- Lee Ji-hoon as Lee Jae-hoon

=== Supporting ===
- Seo Hyun-chul as Oh Dae-yong
- Kim Do-hyun as Seo Min-gyoo
- Goo Seong-hwan as Black Bear
- Gil Hae-yeon as Jang Geum-ja
- Yoo Young-jae as Kim Seok
- Shin Su-hyun as Ji Ha-na
- Hyun Woo as Kang Tae-hyun
- Ok Ye-rin as Lee Yoo-ri, Hee-joo and Jae-hoon's daughter

== Production ==
The first script reading took place in August 2019.

== Ratings ==
In this table, the blue numbers represent the lowest ratings and the red numbers represent the highest ratings.

Ep.	Original broadcast date	Average audience share		
Ep.	Original broadcast date	AGB Nielsen		TNmS
Ep.	Original broadcast date	Nationwide	Seoul	Nationwide
1	December 4, 2019	7.2% (11th)	7.5% (9th)	9.6% (8th)
2	December 4, 2019	8.7% (6th)	9.0% (5th)	10.8% (5th)
3	December 5, 2019	7.0% (12th)	7.1% (11th)	7.2% (13th)
4	December 5, 2019	8.5% (8th)	9.0% (7th)	8.0% (9th)
5	December 11, 2019	9.4% (7th)	10.0% (4th)	7.7% (10th)
6	December 11, 2019	11.3% (3rd)	12.0% (2nd)	9.5% (8th)
7	December 12, 2019	7.8% (10th)	7.5% (13th)	7.0% (14th)
8	December 12, 2019	9.3% (7th)	9.1% (6th)	8.7% (8th)
9	December 18, 2019	8.9% (8th)	8.5% (8th)	8.0% (13th)
10	December 18, 2019	9.9% (6th)	9.8% (4th)	9.7% (7th)
11	December 19, 2019	8.6% (9th)	8.4% (7th)	8.3% (12th)
12	December 19, 2019	10.0% (5th)	9.9% (3rd)	9.4% (8th)
13	December 25, 2019	9.9% (8th)	9.8% (7th)	9.0% (10th)
14	December 25, 2019	11.4% (4th)	11.4% (3rd)	10.1% (7th)
15	December 26, 2019	8.2% (10th)	8.3% (10th)	7.9% (11th)
16	December 26, 2019	9.7% (6th)	9.4% (4th)	9.0% (9th)
17	January 1, 2020	9.5% (9th)	10.0% (8th)	8.6% (13th)
18	January 1, 2020	11.6% (4th)	11.6% (4th)	10.3% (8th)
19	January 2, 2020	8.1% (11th)	7.8% (13th)	6.8% (17th)
20	January 2, 2020	9.1% (7th)	9.2% (5th)	7.7% (13th)
21	January 8, 2020	9.3% (8th)	9.5% (8th)	7.8% (12th)
22	January 8, 2020	10.8% (5th)	10.6% (5th)	9.0% (10th)
23	January 9, 2020	6.8% (12th)	6.7% (14th)	5.9% (18th)
24	January 9, 2020	8.3% (9th)	8.2% (7th)	7.0% (13th)
25	January 15, 2020	8.8% (8th)	9.0% (8th)	8.0% (10th)
26	January 15, 2020	10.1% (7th)	10.2% (5th)	9.1% (8th)
27	January 16, 2020	7.1% (12th)	7.6% (9th)	5.9% (16th)
28	January 16, 2020	8.1% (8th)	8.5% (6th)	7.0% (13th)
29	January 22, 2020	8.6% (9th)	9.2% (5th)	7.5% (12th)
30	January 22, 2020	9.2% (6th)	9.6% (4th)	8.7% (9th)
31	January 23, 2020	6.8% (13th)	6.7% (13th)	6.3% (17th)
32	January 23, 2020	8.5% (7th)	9.0% (5th)	7.6% (10th)
Average		9.0%	9.1%	8.2%
