= Kim Kang-woo =

South Korean actor (born 1978)

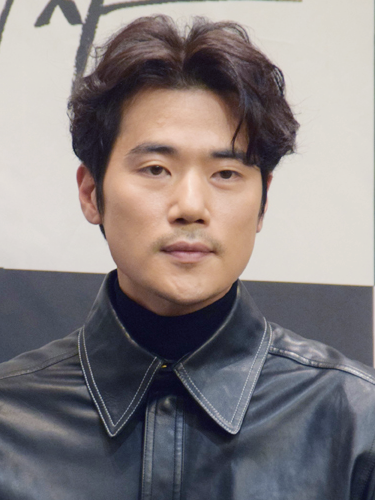
- Kim in 2019
- Born: 11 July 1978 (age 48); South Korea
- Education: Chung-Ang University - Theater and Film
- Occupation: Actor
- Years active: 1998–present
- Agent: NS ENM
- Spouse: Han Mu-young (m. 2010)
- Children: 2

Korean name
- Hangul: 김강우
- RR: Gim Gangu
- MR: Kim Kangu

Kim Kang-woo (Korean: 김강우; born 11 July 1978) is a South Korean actor who debuted in 2002. He is known for his work in various fields such as movies, dramas, and theater, and is a graduate of Chung-Ang University's Department of Theater and Film. He is best known from his roles in The Railroad, The Taste of Money, Le Grand Chef, and The Missing.

== Career ==
=== Beginning ===
Kim Kang-woo majored in Theater and Film at Chung-Ang University. He initially debuted in 1998 as a singer in the trio Guardian after 1.5 years of training, alongside Jo Hyun-jae. However, the group disbanded after a single broadcast appearance due to issues with their agency.

In 2001, Kim transitioned to acting, appearing in bit parts in the SBS TV Movie Series and MBC Series Wuri's Family. In the following Year, Kim make his first acting debut in film The Coast Guard, later commenting that the role of a soldier was the only one he could get without any prior experience. His subsequent performances in the drama series Breathless and Three Leafed Clover earned Kim the nickname "Mr. Right" as he became known for his portrayal of honest and diligent characters.

=== Transition to leading role ===
His first leading film role was in Jeong Jae-eun's 2005 sophomore feature The Aggressives, for which he and co-star Chun Jung-myung were the co-recipients of the Best New Actor Award at the 6th Busan Film Critics Awards.

In 2007, Kim starred in Park Heung-sik's film The Railroad, which told the story of two strangers who reveal their inner pain to each other when they are stranded at the last railway station before the Korean Demilitarized Zone. Kim was upset when the film was only released in ten theaters, and went to screenings by himself in an effort to promote the film, where he greeted and conversed with members of the audience. In spite of its poor box office performance, The Railroad found favour with critics, and Kim won the Best Actor Award at the 25th Torino Film Festival. Although happy to win the award, Kim found it more gratifying to observe Italian audiences responding to the film in the same way as Korean audiences, recognizing the power of film to transcend national borders. He also admitted to being anxious because of the increased expectations people would have over his future performances.

=== Breakthrough ===
Kim found commercial success with his next film, Le Grand Chef, which despite opening during a slow season sold more than three million tickets to become the fourth biggest selling South Korean film of 2007. Based on a popular manhwa, the film focused on the conflict between two rival chefs, played by Kim and Im Won-hee. To prepare for his role, Kim attended cooking classes for one and a half months, and for one crucial scene in particular he visited a slaughterhouse, receiving a big shock as he knew nothing about the slaughtering process. In addition, he was required to film a number of scenes with a cow, and spent some ten days acquainting himself with it—grooming it, feeding it and taking it for walks—remarking that it was "like working with a very sensitive actress". He next starred in the crime thriller Rainbow Eyes the same year, portraying a tough detective who is also a homosexual.

In 2008, Kim took on the lead role in Marine Boy, portraying a former professional swimmer who falls into a debt trap. The same year, he starred in the short film I'm Right Here as part of the omnibus Five Senses of Eros. Kim returned to the small screen in 2009, playing a psychopath in the action thriller The Slingshot.

Following a supporting role in Hong Sang-soo's comedy drama Hahaha, Kim starred in the remake of the 1986 Hong Kong film A Better Tomorrow. Kim was then cast in the Japanese film Black Dawn, playing a Korean agent. He then starred in the short film The Heavenly Creature as part of Kim Jee-woon's science-fiction anthology film Doomsday Book; and played the lead role in erotic thriller The Taste of Money by Im Sang-soo. Kim returned to the small screen in the romantic comedy action drama Lovers of Haeundae. The same year, Kim published a travel book titled Two Men's Unstoppable Thailand Trip, which recorded his Thailand experience with his close friend and filmmaker, Lee Jung-sub.

Making 2013 a busy year; Kim starred in three films: fantasy thriller The Gifted Hands, romantic comedy film Marriage Blue and 3D sports comedy film Mr. Go. Kim then starred in thriller Tabloid Truth as a talent manager, a film focusing on the tabloid culture of South Korea. He next featured in the ensemble drama Cart, a film depict a story about contract workers in a large discount store who are faced with wrongful dismissals. Meanwhile, on the small screen, Kim took on the lead role in the revenge thriller Golden Cross.

=== Return to theater and other works ===
In August 2014, Kim left his previous management agency Namoo Actors and signed with C-JeS Entertainment.In 2015, Kim starred in the period film The Treacherous, playing a tyrant king who exploits the populace for his own carnal pleasures. He then starred in his first cable television series, the mystery thriller The Missing; followed by another thriller, Goodbye Mr. Black, in which he took on a villainous role.

In 2016, Kim and Kim Dong-won were double cast as Hamlet in the 6th Best Theater Festival with a rewrite of Shakespeare's classic, Hamlet−The Play. It was directed by Kim Dong-yeon and was released to coincide with the 400th anniversary of Shakespeare's death. The play was based on the university performance Hamlet - The Storyof a Sad Clown, which Kim Dong-yeon adapted and directed in 2001. Writer Ji Seon joined the project and created the play anew after 15 years.

In 2017, Kim starred in the science fiction drama Circle alongside Yeo Jin-goo. In June 2017, Kim's contract with C-JeS Entertainment expired, and he subsequently signed with new management agency King Entertainment. In 2018, Kim starred in the psychological thriller The Vanished, a remake of the 2012 film The Body. The same year, he starred in the weekend drama My Contracted Husband, Mr. Oh, alongside Uee.

In 2019, Kim starred in the mystery fantasy drama drama Item as the antagonist. The series also starred Ju Ji-hoon, Jin Se-yeon, and Kim Yoo-ri. Kim played Jo Se-hwang, the vice chairman of the Hwawon Group, who is also a sociopath that collects items with supernatural powers by using his power and wealth, murdering anyone who tries to get in his way. It aired on MBC from February 11 to April 2, 2019.

In 2020, Kim starred as Kang Tae-woo, an ex-detective, in Woman of 9.9 Billion. The series also starred Cho Yeo-jeong, Jung Woong-in, Oh Na-ra, and Lee Ji-hoon. It aired on KBS2's Wednesdays and Thursdays from December 4, 2019, to January 23, 2020.

=== Recent projects ===
In 2021, Kim starred alongside Seo Yea-ji in the mystery-thriller film Recalled, directed by Seo Yoo-min. The film follows a woman who starts seeing her future after losing her memory, and was released on April 21, 2021. On September 1, 2021, IOK Company announced the acquisition of KING Entertainment, resulting in Kim's management being transferred to IOK Company from that point forward. Kim next appeared in Artificial City as Jung Joon-hyuk, the husband of Yoon Jae-hee (played by Soo Ae), the illegitimate son of Sungjin Group, and a popular JBC anchorman. It premiered on JTBC on December 8, 2021, and aired every Wednesday and Thursday.

On 19 November 2021, Kim Kang-woo, Kim Seon-ho, Go A-ra, and Kang Tae-joo were confirmed for Park Hoon-jung's noir film The Childe. Kim's role was Han Yi-sa, a second-generation conglomerate. The film was released theatrically on June 21, 2023. In December 2023, Kim renewed his contract with IOK Company.

In 2024, Kim was confirmed for the MBC drama Wonderful World with premiere scheduled for the first half of 2024. Kim acted as Kang Su-ho, a successful anchor and the husband of Eun Soo-hyun (played by Kim Nam-joo). Also in 2024, Kim starred in Park Hoon-jung's The Tyrant, which premiered on Disney+ on August 14, 2024. Originally developed as a film, it was reformatted into a four-part series, as announced by Disney+ on February 19, 2024. Promotional activities featuring Kim alongside co-stars Cha Seung-won, Kim Seon-ho, and Jo Yoon-su were held in July and August ahead of the release. In the series, he plays the character Paul, member of the US intelligence agency trying to dispose of the last sample of The Tyrant Project.

In 2025, Kim was back onstage to appear as Eric Moore in the theater production Red Leaves, running at the National Theater Daloreum Theater from January 8 to March 1, 2025. In 2026, Kim returned to variety television by becoming one of the celebrity chef of KBS2 Stars' Top Recipe at Fun-Staurant. That same year, he was cast in the KBS historical drama Munmu. Kim Kang-woo plays Kim Chun-chu, the first Jingol-born king of Silla and the father of Kim Beom-min.

== Personal life ==
On June 18, 2010, Kim married his longtime girlfriend, Han Mu-young, at Myeongdong Cathedral, following a seven-year relationship. Han is the elder sister of actress Han Hye-jin. Their first son was born in 2011, and a second son was born two years later.

== Filmography ==
=== Film ===
Film(s) acting credit of Kim
Year	Title	Role	Note	Ref.
2002	The Coast Guard	Private Jo		
2003	Silmido	Min-ho		
2004	Springtime	Ju-ho		
2005	The Aggressives	Mogi		
2005	The Beast and the Beauty	Tak Joon-ha		
2007	The Railroad	Kim Man-soo		
2007	Le Grand Chef	Seong-chan		
2007	Rainbow Eyes	Cho Kyung-yoon		
2008	Hello, Schoolgirl	Gyu-cheol	(cameo)	
2009	Marine Boy	Cheon-soo		
2009	Five Senses of Eros	Kang Hyeon-woo		
2010	Ha Ha Ha	Kang Jeong-ho		
2010	A Better Tomorrow	Kim Chul		
2012	Doomsday Book	Park Do-won		
2012	The Taste of Money	Joo Young-jak		
2012	Black Dawn	Yoo Dae-ha / An Min-cheol		
2013	The Gifted Hands	Yang Choon-dong		
2013	In My End Is My Beginning	Jung-ha's younger brother	cameo	
2013	Mr. Go	Doosan Bears general manager Kim		
2013	Marriage Blue	Tae-kyu		
2014	Tabloid Truth	Lee Woo-gon		
2014	Cart	Dong-joon		
2015	The Treacherous	Prince Yeonsan		
2016	Clocking Out	Kim Hyo-chan	Short film)	
2018	The Vanished	Park Jin-han		
2018	High Society	Baek Kwang-hyun		
2021	New Year Blues	Kang Ji-ho		
2021	Recalled	Ji-hoon		
2021	Guimoon: The Lightless Door	Do-jin		
2022	Far East	Ahn Tae-joon	sound film	
2022	Birth	Jeong Ha-sang	special appearance	
2023	The Childe	Han Yi-sa		
2025	Run to the West	Min Yeong		

=== Television drama ===
Television drama(s) acting credit of Kim
Year	Title	Role	Note	Ref.
2001	Wuri's Family	Private Security Company		
2001	You Say It's Love, I Think It's Desire		TV movie	
2003	Breathless	Shin Moo-chul		
2004	Letter		TV movie	
2005	Three Leafed Clover	Yoon Seong-woo		
2008	Bichunmoo	Shi Jun		
2009	The Slingshot	Chae Do-woo		
2012	Lovers of Haeundae	Lee Tae-sung / Nam Hae		
2014	Golden Cross	Kang Do-yoon		
2015	The Missing	Gil Soo-hyun		
2016	Goodbye Mr. Black	Min Seon-jae		
2017	Circle	Kim Joon-hyuk		
2018	My Contracted Husband, Mr. Oh	Oh Jak-doo / Oh-Hyuk		
2018	After the Rain	Bong-gil	One-act drama	
2019	Item	Cho Se-hwang		
2019–2020	Woman of 9.9 Billion	Kang Tae-woo		
2021–2022	Artificial City	Jeong Joon-hyeok		
2024	Wonderful World	Kang Soo-ho		
2024	The Tyrant	Paul	Disney+ original (Supporting role)	
2026	Sword & Silence	Kim Chun-chu		

=== Television show ===
Year	Title	Role	Notes	Ref.
2016	Suspicious Vacation	Cast member	with Im Hyung-joon	
2018	4 Wheeled Restaurant Season 2	Cast member	with Lee Yeon-bok, Seo Eun-soo, and Heo Kyung-hwan	
2020	Law of the Jungle – Hunter and Chef	Cast member	with Kim Byung-man, Im Ji-ho, Kim Gu-ra, Gong Seung-yeon, Lee Yong-jin	
2020	Law of the Jungle – Tribe Chief and Granny	Cast member	with Kim Byung-man, Kim Soo-mi, Park Mi-sun, Jessi, Kangnam, Yang Ji-il	

== Theater ==
List of stage play(s)
Year	Title		Role	Theater	Date	Ref.
Year	English	Korean	Role	Theater	Date	Ref.
2013	Youth Festival	2013 청춘 페스티벌				
2016	Theatrical Battle 6 - Hamlet the Play	연극열전6 - 세 번째 작품 "햄릿 - 더 플레이"	Hamlet	Chungmu Art Center Medium Theater Black	Aug 2–Oct 16	
2025	Red Leaves	붉은 낙엽	Eric Moore	National Theater Daloreum Theater	January 8 to March 1, 2025	

== Discography ==
Album information	Track listing
가디안 (Guardian): Album; Artist: Guardian (Jo Hyun-jae, Kim Kang-woo, 2 others); Released: May 1, 1998; Label:	Track listing: 1. Intro; 2. 슬픈 인연 (Sad Fate); 3. 아르바이트 (Part-time job); 4. 세상이 가르쳐준 이별; 5. 수호천사 (Guardian Angel); 6. 빨라 빨라 (Hurry, Hurry); 7. 애상 (Aesang); 8. 미스터 플라워 (Mister Flower); 9. 죄와 벌 (Crime and Punishment); 10. 일요일 아침같은 그대; 11. 혼돈 (Chaos); 12. Outro
괜찮아요 (I'm Okay): Track from Three Leaf Clover OST; Artist: Kim Kang-woo; Released: January 28, 2005; Label: DSP Entertainment	Track listing: 11. 괜찮아요 (I'm Okay)
한 사람 (One Person): Track from Love Tree Project: Namoo Actors Charity Project; Artist: Kim Kang-woo; Released: January 8, 2010; Label: Ode Music/KT Music	Track listing: 1. 한 사람 (One Person)
그게 맞다면: Single; Artist: Kim Kang-woo; Released: March 25, 2010; Label: Star East Entertainment/Digital Records	Track listing: 1. 그게 맞다면; 2. 그게 맞다면 (Inst.)
위험한 소문 (Dangerous Rumors): Single - Tabloid Truth OST; Artists: Skull, Haha, Kim Kang-woo and Ko Chang-seok; Released: February 11, 2014; Label: QUAN Entertainment/CJ E&M Music	Track listing: 1. 위험한 소문 (Dangerous Rumors); 2. 위험한 소문 (Dangerous Rumors) (Inst.)

== Ambassadorship ==
- Ambassador for Busan Contents Market (2022)

== Awards and nominations ==
Awards and nominations
Award	Year	Category	Nominee / Work	Result	Ref.
6th APAN Star Awards	2018	Excellence Award, Actor in a Serial Drama	My Contracted Husband, Mr. Oh	Nominated	
Buil Film Awards	2023	Popular Star Award	The Childe	Nominated	
6th Busan Film Critics Awards	2005	Best New Actor	The Aggressives	Won	
KBS Drama Awards	2009	Excellence Award, Actor in a Mid-length Drama	The Slingshot	Nominated	
KBS Drama Awards	2012	Excellence Award, Actor in a Miniseries	Haeundae Lovers	Nominated	
KBS Drama Awards	2012	Netizen Award, Actor	Haeundae Lovers	Nominated	
KBS Drama Awards	2012	Best Couple Awardwith Cho Yeo-jeong	Haeundae Lovers	Nominated	
KBS Drama Awards	2014	Excellence Award, Actor in a Mid-length Drama	Golden Cross	Nominated	
KBS Drama Awards	2014	Netizen Award, Actor	Golden Cross	Nominated	
KBS Drama Awards	2014	Best Couple Awardwith Lee Si-young	Golden Cross	Nominated	
KBS Drama Awards	2018	Best Actor in a One-Act/Special/Short Drama	After the Rain	Nominated	
KBS Drama Awards	2019	Excellence Award, Actor in a Miniseries	Woman of 9.9 Billion	Nominated	
KBS Drama Awards	2019	Netizen Award, Actor	Woman of 9.9 Billion	Nominated	
KBS Entertainment Awards	2025	Rookie Award (Reality)	Stars' Top Recipe at Fun-Staurant	Won	
3rd Korean Film Awards	2004	Best New Actor	Springtime	Nominated	
2nd Korea Jewelry Awards	2010	Sapphire Award	Kim Kang-woo	Won	
MBC Drama Awards	2004	Best New Actor	Breathless	Nominated	
MBC Drama Awards	2016	Top Excellence Award, Actor in a Miniseries	Goodbye Mr. Black	Nominated	
MBC Drama Awards	2018	Top Excellence Award, Actor in a Weekend Drama	My Contracted Husband, Mr. Oh	Won	
MBC Drama Awards	2018	Selfish Motive Award – Organic Parody Award with Uee	My Contracted Husband, Mr. Oh	Won	
MBC Drama Awards	2024	Excellence Award, Actor in a Miniseries	Wonderful World	Nominated	
25th Torino Film Festival	2007	Best Actor	The Railroad	Won	
