= My Contracted Husband, Mr. Oh =

2018 South Korean television series

- Promotional poster
- Also known as: My Husband, Mr.Oh!
- Hangul: 데릴남편 오작두
- Lit.: My Husband Oh Jak-doo
- RR: Derillampyeon O Jakdu
- MR: Terillamp'yŏn O Chaktu
- Genre: Melodrama
- Written by: Yoo Yoon-kyung
- Directed by: Baek Ho-min
- Starring: Uee; Kim Kang-woo; Jung Sang-hoon; Han Sun-hwa
- Country of origin: South Korea
- Original language: Korean
- No. of episodes: 24 (Note: This series is the final MBC series to air hour-length episodes, following a repacking of episodes in subsequent dramas and in accordance with the other drama time-slots.)

Production
- Executive producers: Kim Hee-yeol; Jun San
- Running time: 70 minutes
- Production company: Pan Entertainment

Original release
- Network: MBC TV
- Release: March 3 – May 19, 2018

My Contracted Husband, Mr. Oh (Korean: 데릴남편 오작두) is a 2018 South Korean television series starring Uee, Kim Kang-woo, Jung Sang-hoon, and Han Sun-hwa. It aired every Saturday from March 3, 2018 on MBC TV from 8:45 p.m. to 11:10 p.m. (KST), 2 episodes a day.

== Plot ==
Han Seung-Joo (Uee) is a single woman in her mid 30s who works as a producer at a broadcasting station. She does well at her job, but is not nearly as good when it comes to homemaking. Han Seung-Joo has a hard time dealing with social prejudices against single women. While filming a documentary in the mountains, she runs into Oh Jak-Doo (Kim Kang-Woo) whom she contractually marries to achieve the status of married women. Their marriage is not based on love, but their relationship unfolds romantically.

== Cast ==
=== Main ===
- Uee as Han Seung-joo
  - A pragmatic, strong-willed television producer who hires Jak-doo to be her husband solely to gain the social status of a married woman and cope with her safety anxieties.
- Kim Kang-woo as Oh Jak-doo / Oh-Hyuk
  - An optimistic, reclusive herbal collector living in the mountains who is secretly the grandson and prodigy of a legendary traditional instrument master. He enters a contract marriage to protect his mountain property.
- Jung Sang-hoon as Eric Cho / Cho Bong-Sik
  - A wealthy, charismatic traditional arts manager who seeks to find the legendary lost musical prodigy to elevate his own professional standing.
- Han Sun-hwa as Jang Eun-jo
  - A famous celebrity musician, traditional artist, and Oh Hyuk’s first love who returns to Korea to rebuild her career and struggles to let go of their past relationship.

=== Supporting ===
- Han Sang-jin as Bang Yong-min
- Park Jung-soo as Park Jung-ok
- Seol Jung-hwan as Han Seung-tae
- Park Min-ji as Kwon Se-mi
- Jung Chan as Hong In-pyo
- Jung Soo-young as Park Kyung-sook
- Kim Bo-mi as Bang Jung-mi
- Oh Mi-yeon as Kim Gan-nan
- Park Hye-jin as Na Joong-rye
- Bang Eun-hee as Bae Yi-bi
- Choi Sung-jae as Oh Byung-chul
- Seo Woo-jin as (Supporting)

== Production ==
- Kim Hyun-joo and then Lee Min-jung were offered the lead female role, but declined.
- The first script reading took place on January 21, 2018.

== Ratings ==
In the table below, the blue numbers represent the lowest ratings and the red numbers represent the highest ratings.

Ep.	Original broadcast date	Average audience share			
Ep.	Original broadcast date	TNmS		AGB Nielsen	
Ep.	Original broadcast date	Nationwide	Seoul	Nationwide	Seoul
1	March 3, 2018	9.1% (10th)	9.0%	7.9% (12th)	7.8% (13th)
2	March 3, 2018	11.4% (3rd)	10.9%	10.4% (7th)	10.0% (8th)
3	March 10, 2018	9.6% (10th)	9.2%	9.0% (6th)	9.3% (5th)
4	March 10, 2018	13.3% (2nd)	12.9%	13.0% (2nd)	13.4% (2nd)
5	March 17, 2018	9.1% (6th)	8.7%	9.4% (6th)	9.8% (6th)
6	March 17, 2018	12.4% (3rd)	11.8%	12.4% (3rd)	12.9% (3rd)
7	March 24, 2018	9.7% (7th)	9.6%	9.2% (6th)	9.2% (6th)
8	March 24, 2018	13.4% (3rd)	12.8%	12.9% (2nd)	13.4% (3rd)
9	March 31, 2018	8.2% (9th)	8.1%	8.4% (7th)	8.5% (6th)
10	March 31, 2018	11.5% (3rd)	11.2%	11.7% (2nd)	11.4% (2nd)
11	April 7, 2018	10.0% (4th)	9.3%	9.5% (4th)	12.7% (4th)
12	April 7, 2018	13.5% (2nd)	12.9%	10.2% (2nd)	13.3% (2nd)
13	April 14, 2018	9.2% (6th)	9.1%	9.3% (5th)	9.3% (5th)
14	April 14, 2018	12.7% (2nd)	9.6%	12.2% (2nd)	12.3% (2nd)
15	April 21, 2018	9.1% (10th)	9.4%	9.7% (5th)	10.0% (5th)
16	April 21, 2018	11.4% (3rd)	12.0%	12.7% (3rd)	12.9% (3rd)
17	April 28, 2018	8.3% (9th)	8.2%	7.9% (9th)	8.0% (9th)
18	April 28, 2018	11.6% (3rd)	11.4%	11.6% (3rd)	11.8% (3rd)
19	May 5, 2018	8.3% (12th)	8.2%	7.4% (10th)	7.4% (8th)
20	May 5, 2018	11.2% (3rd)	10.6%	11.2% (3rd)	11.7% (2nd)
21	May 12, 2018	9.1% (10th)	8.5%	9.1% (6th)	9.6% (6th)
22	May 12, 2018	11.6% (2nd)	10.7%	13.1% (2nd)	14.0% (2nd)
23	May 19, 2018	8.3% (8th)	-	7.7% (7th)	8.0% (5th)
24	May 19, 2018	13.4% (2nd)	-	11.7% (3rd)	11.9% (2nd)
Average		10.7%	-	10.4%	10.7%

== Awards and nominations ==
Year	Award	Category	Recipient	Result	Ref.
2018	11th Korea Drama Awards	Excellence Award, Actress	Uee	Nominated	
2018	11th Korea Drama Awards	Popular Character Award – Male	Jung Sang-hoon	Won	
2018	6th APAN Star Awards	Excellence Award, Actor in a Serial Drama	Kim Kang-woo	Nominated	
2018	6th APAN Star Awards	Excellence Award, Actress in a Serial Drama	Uee	Nominated	
2018	2018 MBC Drama Awards	Drama of the Year	My Contracted Husband, Mr. Oh	Nominated	
2018	2018 MBC Drama Awards	Top Excellence Award, Actor in a Weekend Drama	Kim Kang-woo	Won	
2018	2018 MBC Drama Awards	Top Excellence Award, Actress in a Weekend Special Project	Uee	Nominated	
2018	2018 MBC Drama Awards	Excellence Award, Actor in a Weekend Drama	Jung Sang-hoon	Won	
2018	2018 MBC Drama Awards	Excellence Award, Actress in a Weekend Special Project	Han Sun-hwa	Nominated	
2018	2018 MBC Drama Awards	Organic Parody Award	Kim Kang-woo and Uee	Won	
