= The Two Sisters (TV series) =

2024 South Korean television series

- Promotional poster
- Hangul: 피도 눈물도 없이
- Lit.: Without Blood or Tears
- RR: Pido nunmuldo eopsi
- MR: P'ido nunmuldo ŏpsi
- Genre: Family; Revenge; Suspense; Romance
- Written by: Kim Kyung-hee; Jin Yu-ri
- Directed by: Kim Shin-il; Choi Jeong-eun
- Starring: Lee So-yeon; Ha Yeon-joo; Oh Chang-seok; Jang Se-hyun; Park Shin-woo; Jung Chan
- Music by: Lee Chang-hee
- Country of origin: South Korea
- Original language: Korean
- No. of episodes: 104

Production
- Executive producers: Kim Sang-hee; Lee Ye-won
- Producers: Lee Eun-jin; Park Chun-ho; Lee Seung-beom; Ham Young-geol
- Editor: Lim Hyun-jin
- Running time: 40 minutes
- Production companies: Monster Union; My Nest Company

Original release
- Network: KBS2
- Release: January 22 – June 14, 2024

The Two Sisters (Korean: 피도 눈물도 없이) is a 2024 South Korean drama starring Lee So-yeon, Ha Yeon-joo, Oh Chang-seok, Jang Se-hyun, Park Shin-woo, and Jung Chan. It aired on KBS2 from January 22 to June 14, 2024, every Monday to Friday at 19:50 (KST).

== Synopsis ==
The Two Sisters tells the tragic story of Lee Hye-won and Lee Hye-ji, whom were separated when they were young due to their parents' divorce. 20 years later, they met each other leading to a tangled and evil relationship.

== Cast and characters ==
=== Main ===
- Lee So-yeon as Lee Hye-won

Hye-ji's older sister who works as general manager of the Judan Arts Foundation.

- Ha Yeon-joo as Lee Hye-ji / Bae Do-eun

Hye-won's younger sister, she started living as Bae Do-eun after meeting Yoon Lee-cheol.

- Oh Chang-seok as Baek Seong-yoon

A human rights lawyer with an ordinary personality and special ability.

- Jang Se-hyun as Yoon Ji-chang

Hye-won's husband as well as the son of Lee-cheol and Soo-hyang. He is also team leader of YJ Group's strategic planning.

- Park Shin-woo as Lee San-deul

Hye-won's younger stepbrother and Ji-chang's middle school friend who owns a tteokbokki restaurant.

- Jung Chan as Yoon Lee-cheol

Ji-chang's father who serves as CEO of YJ Group.

=== Supporting ===
==== Ji-chang's family ====
- Yang Hye-jin as Oh Soo-hyang

Ji-chang's mother and Hye-won's mother-in-law who serves as chairwoman of Judan Art Foundation.

- Jung Hye-sun as Kim Myeong-ae

Grandmother of Ji-chang. She is also honorary chairman of YJ Group.

- Jung Soo-young as Yoon Yi-ra

Ji-chang's aunt and Lee-cheol's younger sister who is the director of YJ Group.

- Im Soo-ha as Yoon Yong-ki

Ji-chang and Hye-won's son.

==== Hye-won and Do-eun's family ====
- Yoo Tae-woong as Lee Min-tae

The biological father of Hye-won and Do-eun as well as San-deul's adoptive father. He is also a real estate auction consultant.

- Kim Ye-ryeong as Lee Min-suk

Min-tae's older sister as well as Hye-won and Do-eun's aunt who is a former nurse.

- Yoo Ji-yeon as Kim Seon-kyung

Hye-won's stepmother who died ten years ago.

- Yoon Bok-in as Pi Young-ju

Hye-won and Do-eun's biological mother and Jang-gun's wife. She is a terrible gambling addict.

- Kang Sung-jin as Bae Jang-gun

Do-eun's stepfather and Young-ju's current husband. He is a former loan shark and currently unemployed.

==== People at YJ Group ====
- Jeon Yu-rim as Cha Ji-eun

Childhood friend of Ji-chang and leader of the TF Team.

- Seo Ha-joon as Lee Jun-mo

CEO of Vision Investment and investor of YJ Group.

==== Others ====
- Lee Ah-hyun as Son Yang-ah, Cha Ji-eun's mother.
- Shin Ha-rang as Jung Gyeong-ja, a girl who is ten years older than Do-eun and can do anything if he gives her money. They met in the United States.
- Hyeon Cheol-ho as Secretary Kim

Lee-cheol's secretary.

- Cha Gi-sa, Myeong-ae's driver.

== Original soundtrack ==
=== Part 1 ===
Released on January 25, 2024
No.	Title	Lyrics	Music	Artist	Length
1.	"Why Am I Crying" (왜 내가 울어)	Invincible W; Lydia	Invincible W; Lydia; Lee Han	Kim Hyun-jung	3:46
2.	"Why Am I Crying" (왜 내가 울어; Inst.)		Invincible W; Lydia; Lee Han		3:46
Total length:					7:32

=== Part 2 ===
Released on February 1, 2024
No.	Title	Lyrics	Music	Artist	Length
1.	"I Live Because I Can't Forget You" (너를 잊지 못해 살아가)	Invincible W; Heziin	Invincible W; Heziin; Jang Seok-won	Ran	3:20
2.	"I Live Because I Can't Forget You" (너를 잊지 못해 살아가; Inst.)		Invincible W; Heziin; Jang Seok-won		3:20
Total length:					6:40

=== Part 3 ===
Released on February 7, 2024
No.	Title	Lyrics	Music	Artist	Length
1.	"After You Leave" (니가 떠난 그 후로)	Invincible W; Hwang Byeong-hee	Invincible W; Hwang Byeong-hee; Lee Han	Joo Won-tak	3:52
2.	"After You Leave" (니가 떠난 그 후로; Inst.)		Invincible W; Hwang Byeong-hee; Lee Han		3:52
Total length:					7:44

=== Part 4 ===
Released on February 15, 2024
No.	Title	Lyrics	Music	Artist	Length
1.	"The Relationship Between Us Who Loves and Is Loved" (사랑하고 사랑받는 우리의 사이가)	Invincible W; Joo Hyun-min	Invincible W; Joo Hyun-min; Lee Han	The Daisy	3:44
2.	"The Relationship Between Us Who Loves and Is Loved" (사랑하고 사랑받는 우리의 사이가; Inst.)		Invincible W; Joo Hyun-min; Lee Han		3:44
Total length:					7:28

=== Part 5 ===
Released on February 22, 2024
No.	Title	Lyrics	Music	Artist	Length
1.	"Lachrymal Gland" (눈물샘)	Invincible W; Hwang Byeong-hee	Invincible W; Hwang Byeong-hee; Jimin (Jak); Ham Ha-bin	Han Kyung-il	3:16
2.	"Lachrymal Gland" (눈물샘; Inst.)		Invincible W; Hwang Byeong-hee; Jimin (Jak); Ham Ha-bin		3:16
Total length:					6:32

=== Part 6 ===
Released on February 29, 2024
No.	Title	Lyrics	Music	Artist	Length
1.	"No Matter How Much It Hurts" (아무리 아파도)	Invincible W; Ahn Sol-hee	Invincible W; Ahn Sol-hee; Jimin (Jak); Ham Ha-bin	Yeoeun	3:54
2.	"No Matter How Much It Hurts" (아무리 아파도; Inst.)		Invincible W; Ahn Sol-hee; Jimin (Jak); Ham Ha-bin		3:54
Total length:					7:48

=== Part 7 ===
Released on March 6, 2024
No.	Title	Lyrics	Music	Artist	Length
1.	"I'm Sorry For Loving You" (사랑해서 미안해)	Rhinoceros; Go Byeong-sik	Rhinoceros; Lee Hyeong-seong	Park Kwang-sun	4:16
2.	"I'm Sorry For Loving You" (사랑해서 미안해; Inst.)		Rhinoceros; Lee Hyeong-seong		4:16
Total length:					8:32

=== Part 8 ===
Released on March 14, 2024
No.	Title	Lyrics	Music	Artist	Length
1.	"When Spring Comes on the White Snow" (흰 눈 위에 봄이 찾아오면)	Invincible W; Jeon Geun-hwa (Weeky1)	Invincible W; Jeon Geun-hwa (Weeky1); Jang Seok-won	DK Soul	3:42
2.	"When Spring Comes on the White Snow" (흰 눈 위에 봄이 찾아오면; Inst.)		Invincible W; Jeon Geun-hwa (Weeky1); Jang Seok-won		3:42
Total length:					7:24

=== Part 9 ===
Released on March 21, 2024
No.	Title	Lyrics	Music	Artist	Length
1.	"Pledge" (서약)	Hong Jin-young	Hong Jin-young; Go Byeong-sik; Lee Hyeong-seong	J-Cera	3:44
2.	"Pledge" (서약; Inst.)		Hong Jin-young; Go Byeong-sik; Lee Hyeong-seong		3:44
Total length:					7:28

=== Part 10 ===
Released on March 28, 2024
No.	Title	Lyrics	Music	Artist	Length
1.	"I Believe In Destiny" (운명을 나는 믿어요)	Invincible W; Ahn Sol-hee	Invincible W; Ahn Sol-hee; Jang Seok-won; Han Sang-hyun	Suki	3:27
2.	"I Believe In Destiny" (운명을 나는 믿어요; Inst.)		Invincible W; Ahn Sol-hee; Jang Seok-won; Han Sang-hyun		3:27
Total length:					6:54

=== Part 11 ===
Released on April 4, 2024
No.	Title	Lyrics	Music	Artist	Length
1.	"After Love" (후애)	Jeong Seon-yeon; Choi Eun-jung	Jeong Seon-yeon; Jeong Su-won; Lee Sang-jun	Jeong Seon-yeon	4:51
2.	"After Love" (후애; Inst.)		Jeong Seon-yeon; Jeong Su-won; Lee Sang-jun		4:51
Total length:					9:42

=== Part 12 ===
Released on April 11, 2024
No.	Title	Lyrics	Music	Artist	Length
1.	"Say I Love You"	Go Byeong-sik	Go Byeong-sik; Jeong Mi-hyeon; Do Han-seok	Gilme	3:36
2.	"Say I Love You" (Inst.)		Go Byeong-sik; Jeong Mi-hyeon; Do Han-seok		3:36
Total length:					7:12

=== Part 13 ===
Released on April 18, 2024
No.	Title	Lyrics	Music	Artist	Length
1.	"Can I Tell You How I Feel?" (내 맘을 말해도 될까요)	Been; Ju Won	Been; Hyunki	Seungmin (HashTag)	3:52
2.	"Can I Tell You How I Feel?" (내 맘을 말해도 될까요; Inst.)		Been; Hyunki		3:52
Total length:					7:44

=== Part 14 ===
Released on April 25, 2024
No.	Title	Lyrics	Music	Artist	Length
1.	"To You" (너에게)	Invincible W; Morning Coffee	Invincible W; Morning Coffee; Dry Teeth; Kim Jun-seop	Morning Coffee	3:58
2.	"To You" (너에게; Inst.)		Invincible W; Morning Coffee; Dry Teeth; Kim Jun-seop		3:58
Total length:					7:56

=== Part 15 ===
Released on May 2, 2024
No.	Title	Lyrics	Music	Artist	Length
1.	"This Heart Is New To Me" (이런 맘은 처음이라서)	Go Byeong-sik	Go Byeong-sik; Lee Hyeong-seong	Kajin	3:42
2.	"This Heart Is New To Me" (이런 맘은 처음이라서; Inst.)		Go Byeong-sik; Lee Hyeong-seong		3:42
Total length:					7:24

=== Part 16 ===
Released on May 9, 2024
No.	Title	Lyrics	Music	Artist	Length
1.	"Hide and Seek" (숨바꼭질)	Invincible W; Lydia	Invincible W; Lydia; Jang Seok-won; Lee Yun-jae	Hwang Si-yeon	3:31
2.	"Hide and Seek" (이런 맘은 처음이라서; Inst.)		Invincible W; Lydia; Jang Seok-won; Lee Yun-jae		3:31
Total length:					7:02

=== Part 17 ===
Released on May 16, 2024
No.	Title	Lyrics	Music	Artist	Length
1.	"Each Other" (서로)	Invincible W; Yook Sang-hee	Invincible W; Yook Sang-hee; Jang Seok-won; Han Sang-hyun	Hangabin	3:41
2.	"Each Other" (서로; Inst.)		Invincible W; Yook Sang-hee; Jang Seok-won; Han Sang-hyun		3:41
Total length:					7:22

== Viewership ==
The Two Sisters : South Korea viewers per episode (thousands)

Episodes	Episode number																									
Episodes	1	2	3	4	5	6	7	8	9	10	11	12	13	14	15	16	17	18	19	20	21	22	23	24	25	26
1–26	1408	1466	1477	1273	1436	1435	1488	1383	1442	1391	1339	1380	1319	1163	1255	1336	1256	1314	1337	1308	1311	1206	1147	1217	1229	1355
27–52	1212	1295	1362	1231	1267	1239	1240	1227	1248	1366	1214	1293	1253	1227	1430	1252	1231	1373	1407	1368	1258	1378	1286	1270	1420	1278
53–78	1263	1233	1167	1248	1092	1104	1139	1269	1244	1261	1182	1199	1143	1343	1013	1109	1155	1189	1218	1198	1202	1138	1269	1370	1047	1252
79–104	1243	1303	1256	1372	1317	1211	1171	1258	1215	1253	1242	1291	1321	1181	1351	1229	1192	1230	1145	1156	1075	1260	1304	1301	1225	1349

Source: Audience measurement performed nationwide by Nielsen Korea.

Average TV viewership ratings
Ep.	Original broadcast date	Average audience share (Nielsen Korea)	
Ep.	Original broadcast date	Nationwide	Seoul
1	January 22, 2024	8.0% (3rd)	6.8% (3rd)
2	January 23, 2024	8.3% (2nd)	6.5% (4th)
3	January 24, 2024	8.7% (2nd)	7.0% (2nd)
4	January 25, 2024	7.9% (3rd)	6.7% (2nd)
5	January 26, 2024	8.6% (4th)	7.4% (4th)
6	January 29, 2024	8.3% (2nd)	7.0% (2nd)
7	January 30, 2024	8.4% (2nd)	6.7% (2nd)
8	January 31, 2024	8.0% (2nd)	6.7% (2nd)
9	February 1, 2024	8.4% (2nd)	7.3% (2nd)
10	February 2, 2024	8.6% (3rd)	7.4% (4th)
11	February 5, 2024	8.2% (2nd)	7.4% (2nd)
12	February 6, 2024	8.2% (2nd)	6.8% (2nd)
13	February 7, 2024	7.3% (4th)	6.0% (4th)
14	February 8, 2024	6.7% (4th)	5.6% (4th)
15	February 9, 2024	6.4% (4th)	5.5% (7th)
16	February 13, 2024	8.1% (2nd)	6.7% (2nd)
17	February 14, 2024	7.4% (3rd)	5.6% (6th)
18	February 15, 2024	7.5% (2nd)	6.1% (2nd)
19	February 16, 2024	7.6% (5th)	6.3% (6th)
20	February 19, 2024	7.7% (3rd)	6.8% (2nd)
21	February 20, 2024	7.5% (3rd)	6.3% (2nd)
22	February 21, 2024	7.2% (4th)	6.1% (4th)
23	February 22, 2024	6.7% (4th)	5.5% (6th)
24	February 23, 2024	6.8% (5th)	5.2% (8th)
25	February 26, 2024	7.3% (4th)	6.5% (2nd)
26	February 27, 2024	7.9% (2nd)	6.4% (2nd)
27	February 28, 2024	7.3% (4th)	6.1% (2nd)
28	February 29, 2024	7.7% (2nd)	6.4% (2nd)
29	March 1, 2024	7.4% (3rd)	6.0% (6th)
30	March 4, 2024	7.4% (4th)	6.1% (3rd)
31	March 5, 2024	7.3% (3rd)	5.2% (5th)
32	March 6, 2024	7.3% (3rd)	5.6% (5th)
33	March 7, 2024	6.9% (4th)	5.0% (5th)
34	March 8, 2024	7.4% (7th)	5.7% (7th)
35	March 11, 2024	7.4% (4th)	6.0% (3rd)
36	March 12, 2024	7.8% (2nd)	6.5% (2nd)
37	March 13, 2024	7.0% (5th)	5.6% (6th)
38	March 14, 2024	7.3% (2nd)	5.9% (2nd)
39	March 15, 2024	7.4% (6th)	5.9% (5th)
40	March 18, 2024	7.3% (4th)	5.9% (4th)
41	March 19, 2024	8.5% (2nd)	7.2% (2nd)
42	March 20, 2024	7.2% (5th)	5.6% (7th)
43	March 21, 2024	7.2% (3rd)	6.2% (2nd)
44	March 22, 2024	7.7% (5th)	5.9% (6th)
45	March 25, 2024	8.1% (2nd)	6.4% (4th)
46	March 26, 2024	7.9% (5th)	6.1% (4th)
47	March 27, 2024	7.1% (4th)	5.6% (6th)
48	March 28, 2024	7.7% (2nd)	6.2% (3rd)
49	March 29, 2024	7.3% (3rd)	5.6% (5th)
50	April 1, 2024	7.8% (2nd)	6.4% (3rd)
51	April 2, 2024	7.7% (2nd)	6.1% (3rd)
52	April 3, 2024	7.6% (3rd)	5.7% (5th)
53	April 4, 2024	7.6% (3rd)	6.6% (3rd)
54	April 5, 2024	7.2% (3rd)	5.7% (5th)
55	April 8, 2024	7.2% (3rd)	5.9% (5th)
56	April 9, 2024	7.1% (3rd)	6.0% (3rd)
57	April 10, 2024	5.8% (8th)	4.9% (12th)
58	April 11, 2024	7.3% (2nd)	6.1% (4th)
59	April 12, 2024	6.7% (5th)	5.2% (7th)
60	April 15, 2024	8.0% (2nd)	6.4% (5th)
61	April 16, 2024	7.4% (2nd)	6.0% (3rd)
62	April 17, 2024	7.4% (2nd)	6.1% (2nd)
63	April 18, 2024	7.0% (2nd)	5.7% (2nd)
64	April 19, 2024	6.9% (3rd)	5.4% (7th)
65	April 22, 2024	6.9% (4th)	5.5% (6th)
66	April 23, 2024	7.6% (2nd)	6.0% (3rd)
67	April 24, 2024	6.1% (6th)	4.6% (9th)
68	April 25, 2024	6.9% (4th)	5.7% (4th)
69	April 26, 2024	7.1% (4th)	5.5% (5th)
70	April 29, 2024	7.3% (3rd)	5.4% (6th)
71	April 30, 2024	7.2% (2nd)	5.4% (4th)
72	May 1, 2024	6.7% (4th)	4.8% (8th)
73	May 2, 2024	6.8% (3rd)	5.0% (5th)
74	May 3, 2024	6.8% (5th)	5.4% (5th)
75	May 6, 2024	7.7% (2nd)	6.2% (4th)
76	May 7, 2024	7.5% (2nd)	6.0% (3rd)
77	May 8, 2024	6.5% (5th)	5.0% (5th)
78	May 9, 2024	7.0% (3rd)	5.9% (3rd)
79	May 10, 2024	7.5% (3rd)	6.1% (4th)
80	May 13, 2024	7.4% (3rd)	6.1% (4th)
81	May 14, 2024	7.3% (2nd)	6.2% (3rd)
82	May 15, 2024	7.9% (2nd)	6.7% (3rd)
83	May 16, 2024	7.5% (4th)	6.5% (3rd)
84	May 17, 2024	7.0% (5th)	5.5% (6th)
85	May 20, 2024	7.1% (4th)	5.6% (3rd)
86	May 21, 2024	7.3% (2nd)	5.8% (4th)
87	May 22, 2024	7.0% (4th)	5.2% (4th)
88	May 23, 2024	7.2% (3rd)	6.2% (2nd)
89	May 24, 2024	6.8% (4th)	6.0% (4th)
90	May 27, 2024	7.6% (3rd)	6.4% (2nd)
91	May 28, 2024	7.5% (2nd)	5.9% (2nd)
92	May 29, 2024	7.0% (5th)	5.6% (6th)
93	May 30, 2024	7.9% (2nd)	6.5% (2nd)
94	May 31, 2024	7.4% (3rd)	6.1% (6th)
95	June 3, 2024	7.3% (4th)	6.4% (4th)
96	June 4, 2024	7.0% (2nd)	5.7% (2nd)
97	June 5, 2024	7.0% (3rd)	5.6% (5th)
98	June 6, 2024	7.0% (4th)	6.0% (4th)
99	June 7, 2024	6.7% (4th)	5.4% (6th)
100	June 10, 2024	7.7% (2nd)	6.6% (2nd)
101	June 11, 2024	7.6% (3rd)	6.1% (3rd)
102	June 12, 2024	7.9% (2nd)	6.9% (2nd)
103	June 13, 2024	7.8% (2nd)	6.3% (2nd)
104	June 14, 2024	7.6% (3rd)	6.3% (4th)
Average		7.3%	5.7%
In the table above, the blue numbers represent the lowest ratings and the red numbers represent the highest ratings.
