= Lovers of Haeundae =

2012 South Korean television series

- Promotional poster
- Also known as: Lovers in Haeundae
- Hangul: 해운대 연인들
- Hanja: 海雲臺戀人들
- RR: Haeundae yeonindeul
- MR: Haeundae yŏnindŭl
- Genre: Romance, Comedy, Action
- Written by: Hwang Eun-kyung
- Directed by: Song Hyun-wook; Park Jin-seok
- Starring: Kim Kang-woo; Cho Yeo-jeong; Jung Suk-won; Park Geon-il; Nam Gyu-ri
- Country of origin: South Korea
- Original language: Korean
- No. of episodes: 16

Production
- Executive producer: Lee Jae-young
- Producers: Kim Eui-joon; Lee So-yeon; Lee Sun-sang
- Production location: Korea
- Running time: Mondays and Tuesdays at 21:55 (KST)
- Production companies: SSD Co., Ltd. Timo E&M

Original release
- Network: KBS2
- Release: 12 August – 24 September 2012

Lovers of Haeundae (Korean: 해운대 연인들; RR: Haeundae yeonindeul) is a 2012 South Korean television series about a prosecutor who goes undercover to infiltrate a crime family in Haeundae, Busan, and after losing his memory, falls in love with the daughter of a mob boss.

== Plot ==
Newly wed public prosecutor, Lee Tae-sung, goes undercover in pursuit of a gangster in Haeundae, Busan, attacked by his quarry and thrown into the sea, he loses his memory of who he was. Homeless and alone in the world he is taken in by the family of a deposed crime boss, who believe him to be his cover, a body builder and performer in a night club revue, who came to Busan after falling in love with Go So-ra, the daughter of the crime boss. Despite misunderstandings and bickering, Lee and Go marry and the two fall in love for real. However, after he recovers his memory, he stands at a crossroad and has to decide which of his wives he will stay with; the one he married out of duty and who can help him in his career, or the one he loves.

== Cast ==
Actor	Role	Notes
Kim Kang-woo	Lee Tae-sung / Nam Hae / Yang Tae-sung	Public prosecutor who hates gangsters with a passion. Married Lee Se-na in an arranged marriage calculated to help further his career and advance the social position of his adopted parents. Long lost son of President Yang who took control of the Haeundae Hotel from Go Joong-shik. As an amnesiac took the name Nam Hae and believed himself to be a body builder and night club performer. In order to prevent Go Joong-shik from being committed into a mental hospital, married Go So-ra after the groom failed to show for the wedding, came to love So-ra so much that he would have been happy to live out the remainder of his life as Nam Hae
Cho Yeo-jeong	Go So-ra	Daughter of a deposed crime boss, makes a living delivering live fish to Busan eateries, and other odd jobs such as sushi chef and homestay rentals, dreams of regaining control of her childhood home, the Haeundae Hotel
Jung Suk-won	Choi Joon-hyuk	Korean American vice-President of the Haeundae Hotel, son of the owner of Prestige Hotels which is planning an hostile take-over of the Haeundae Hotel, step-brother of Go So-ra with whom he is infatuated and is a rival of Lee Tae-sung for her love, however in the end chooses to help her and Lee Tae-sung because of it
Nam Gyu-ri	Yun Se-na	Lee Tae-sung's wife, footwear designer, daughter of the Minister of Justice, in an unhappy marriage with Lee Tae-sung as she loves him and knows that this love is not returned, in the end learns to let go of Tae-sung, and seeks a happier relationship with Choi Joon-hyuk
Im Ha-ryong	Go Joong-shik	Father of So-ra, head of what remains of the White Sands Gang, deposed mob boss and kindergarten student, brain damaged in his last gang fight and now has the mental age of a six-year-old
Lee Jae-yong	Lee Soon-shin	ex-gangster and fisherman, one of the last of Go Joong-shik loyal followers, Lee Gwan-soon's father
Park Sang-myun	Boo Young-do	ex-gangster and fisherman, one of the last of Go Joong-shik loyal followers, has a liking for all things Kawaii
Park Geon-il	Lee Dong-baek	ex-gangster and fisherman, one of the last of Go Joong-shik loyal followers
Choi Sang-hoon	Lee Se-jo	Attorney at law, Lee Tae-sung's adoptive father
Kim Young-ok	Shim Mal-nyun	Yang Tae-sung's nanny as a child, President Yang's last hope in finding his son
Kim Hye-eun	Yook Tam-hee	Second wife of President Yang, and acting President, hates Go So-ra and rivals with both the White Sands Gang and Choi Joon-hyuk
Kang Min-kyung	Hwang Joo-hee	Senior secretary at Haeundae Hotel, So-ra's childhood friend, and Se-na's college classmate, keeps knowledge that Nam Hae is Lee Tae-sung with the thought of having him for herself though nothing comes of these plans
Park So-yeon	Lee Gwan-soon	Scatterbrained daughter of one of the White Sands Gang, as a sister to Sora
Kim Tae-hyun	Kang Min-goo	Fraudster, became engaged to So-ra to defraud her and her family, stood her up on their supposed wedding day

== Ratings ==
Episode #	Original broadcast date	Average audience share			
Episode #	Original broadcast date	TNmS Ratings		AGB Nielsen	
Episode #	Original broadcast date	Nationwide	Seoul National Capital Area	Nationwide	Seoul National Capital Area
1	6 August 2012	8.5%	7.5%	9.8% (15th)	9.3% (16th)
2	7 August 2012	11.5%	12.4%	12.1%	12.8%
3	13 August 2012	8.5%	8.2%	8.0%	8.4%
4	14 August 2012	9.9%	10.4%	8.2%	8.7%
5	20 August 2012	9.6%	9.0%	9.7%	9.9%
6	21 August 2012	10.5%	10.6%	9.3%	9.7%
7	27 August 2012	9.7%	9.2%	9.1%	9.8%
8	28 August 2012	11.2%	11.2%	9.8%	11.2%
9	3 September 2012	10.4%	11.5%	9.9%	10.5%
10	4 September 2012	10.3%	10.2%	9.3%	9.3%
11	10 September 2012	9.3%	9.0%	7.7%	8.6%
12	17 September 2012	9.9%	9.7%	9.0%	9.0%
13	18 September 2012	11.0%	10.6%	10.3%	10.9%
14	24 September 2012	10.4%	10.6%	9.2%	9.4%
15	24 September 2012	10.2%	10.6%	9.3%	9.6%
16	25 September 2012	11.5%	12.3%	11.3%	11.6%
Average		10.1%	-	9.5%	-

== Awards and nominations ==
Year	Award	Category	Recipient	Result	Ref.
2012	KBS Drama Awards	Excellence Award, Actor in a Miniseries	Kim Kang-woo	Nominated	
2012	KBS Drama Awards	Excellence Award, Actress in a Miniseries	Jo Yeo-jeong	Nominated	
2012	KBS Drama Awards	Best Couple Award	Jo Yeo-jeong, Kim Kang-woo	Nominated	
2012	DramaBeans Awards	Best Kiss	Kim Kang-woo & Jo Yeo-jeong	Nominated	
2013	DramaFever Awards	Most underrated Drama	Lovers of Haeundae	Nominated	
