= I Need Romance 2012 =

2012 South Korean television series

- Promotional poster
- Also known as: I Need Romance 2
- Genre: Romance, Comedy, Drama
- Written by: Jung Hyun-jung
- Directed by: Lee Jung-hyo; Jang Young-woo
- Starring: Jung Yu-mi; Lee Jin-wook; Kim Ji-seok
- Country of origin: South Korea
- Original language: Korean
- No. of episodes: 16

Production
- Producer: Lee Sang-baek
- Production company: JS Pictures

Original release
- Network: tvN
- Release: June 20 – August 9, 2012

Related
- I Need Romance; I Need Romance 3

I Need Romance 2012 (Korean: 로맨스가 필요해 2012; RR: Romaenseuga piryohae 2012) is a 2012 South Korean romantic comedy television drama, starring Jung Yu-mi, Lee Jin-wook and Kim Ji-seok. The series follows the everyday lives of work, love and friendship of thirty-something women and men in Seoul. It aired on cable channel tvN from June 20 to August 9, 2012 on Wednesdays and Thursdays at 23:00 for 16 episodes.

Following the success of tvN's I Need Romance in 2011, I Need Romance 2012 is a loose spin-off with new characters, but continues the first season's frank discussion of sex and realistic depiction of messy relationships.

== Plot ==
Joo Yeol-mae was in a 12 year on-and-off relationship with her boyfriend Yoon Seok-hyun, before they broke up for the fifth time 3 years ago. This is mainly because Seok-hyun keeps her at arm's length and does not want to get married. However, even after they break up, Yeol-mae and Seok-hyun remain friends and are present in each other's lives. Enter Shin Ji-hoon, an alluring new love interest who shakes up Yeol-mae's world and lands her in a love triangle. Torn between two men, can Yeol-mae find true romance, or will she lose it all?

== Cast ==
- Jung Yu-mi as Joo Yeol-mae
- Lee Jin-wook as Yoon Seok-hyun
- Kim Ji-seok as Shin Ji-hoon
- Kim Ji-woo as Seon Jae-kyung
- Kang Ye-sol as Woo Ji-hee
- Kim Ye-won as Kang Na-hyun
- In Gyo-jin as Han Jung-min
- Gong Jung-hwan as Lee Jang-woo
- Heo Tae-hee as Kim Tae-woo
- Jung Gyu-woon as blind date Kim Han-sub (cameo)
- Yoon Sung-ho as trench coat man (cameo)
- Choi Song-hyun as Kang Hyun-joo (cameo)
- Ha Yeon-joo as Yoon Kang-hee (cameo)
- Kim Hyung-min as Kim Deok-soo (cameo)
- Kim Sae-ron as Yoon Gi-hyun (cameo)

== Awards and nominations ==
Year	Award	Category	Nominee	Result
2016	tvN10 Awards	Romantic-Comedy Queen	Jung Yu-mi	Nominated
