= The Concubine (film) =

- Promotional poster for The Concubine
- Hangul: 후궁: 제왕의 첩
- Hanja: 後宮: 帝王의 妾
- RR: Hugung: jewangui cheop
- MR: Hugung: chewangŭi ch'ŏp
- Directed by: Kim Dae-seung
- Written by: Hwang Yoon-jeong; Kim Dae-seung; Kim Mee-jung
- Produced by: Hwang Yoon-jeong
- Starring: Jo Yeo-jeong; Kim Dong-wook; Kim Min-jun
- Cinematography: Hwang Ki-seok
- Edited by: Kim Sang-bum
- Music by: Jo Yeong-wook
- Distributed by: Lotte Entertainment
- Release date: 6 June 2012 (South Korea)
- Running time: 122 minutes
- Country: South Korea
- Language: Korean
- Box office: ₩19,330,302,500 $16,463,290

The Concubine (Korean: 후궁: 제왕의 첩; RR: Hugung: jewangui cheop; lit. 'Royal Concubine: Concubine to the King') is a 2012 South Korean historical erotic thriller film directed by Kim Dae-seung. Set in the Joseon period, it centers around Hwa-yeon (Jo Yeo-jeong), who becomes a royal concubine against her will, Kwon-yoo (Kim Min-jun), a man torn between love and revenge, and Prince Sung-won (Kim Dong-wook), who has his heart set on Hwa-yeon despite the countless women available to him. These three characters form a love triangle.

== Plot ==
The film begins with a concubine of the previous king (Park Ji-young) in a precarious position of having no blood ties to her step son, the current childless, widower king (Jung Chan). She schemes to replace him on the throne with her submissive young son Sung-won (Kim Dong-wook). Indifferent to his mother's plans, the timid prince falls in love at first sight with Hwa-yeon (Jo Yeo-jeong), an aristocrat's daughter, who has already found love with Kwon-yoo (Kim Min-jun), a low-born commoner. When her father (Ahn Suk-hwan) is obligated to send her into the royal palace as a concubine for the king, the two lovers try to elope but are caught after their first night together. Hwa-yeon agrees to enter the palace in exchange for saving Kwon-yoo's life.

Five years later, Hwa-yeon has become the Queen from giving birth to a son. Sung-won comes back from traveling to see the King upon hearing of his ill-health. In a private conversation, Sung-won gifts a hair stick to Hwa-yeon as a present and confession of his feelings.

The king dies of a mysterious illness, and the former concubine sits her son, Prince Sung-won, on the throne as a puppet king, naming herself Regent and Queen Mother and taking firm control over the royal court. Hwa-yeon is moved to a closely watched, humble residence, where she is under constant surveillance. When Hwa-yeon's father, a royal court minister, attempts to prove that the previous king died from poisonous assassination, he and all of the ministers disloyal to the queen mother are arrested for treason.

Hwa-yeon discovers her former lover, Kwon-yoo, working in the castle among the eunuchs. Initially glad to see him, she reaches out for comfort and assistance, hoping some of their original feelings remain. Though his life was spared, Kwon-yoo was castrated by Hwa-yeon's father for daring to elope with her and he is now resentful and embittered towards both of them. Kwon-yoo has aligned himself with Minister Yoon and the Queen Mother to find power in his new position and rebuffs Hwa-yeon. Hwa-yeon's efforts to free her father and rescue him from execution are sabotaged by Kwon-yoo, who directly undermines Sung-won's exoneration orders to ensure the man's death. Kwon-yoo agrees to assassinate Hwa-yeon and her child with a block of poisonous aconite received from Minister Yoon by the orders of the Queen Mother, who wishes to secure her position and remove Hwa-yeon from influencing Sung-won.

Sung-won is still very attracted to Hwa-yeon, bestowing favors and attention. In a fit of pique, he takes Geum-ok, Hwa-yeon's personal maid, as a minor concubine so he can inquire about Hwa-yeon's private habits. One night, Sung-won enters Geum-ok's room and is frothed into a rage when he sees her wearing the hair stick he had gifted to Hwa-yeon. To save her own life, Geum-ok reveals that Kwon-yoo had a relationship with Hwa-yeon, and that the young prince had been born prematurely, making his parentage suspect. Sung-won confronts Hwa-yeon, accusing her of hiding her lover as a fake eunuch, but dismisses the accusations after pulling down Kwon-yoo's pants to reveal his castration. Sung-won attempts to rape Hwa-yeon, but Hwa-yeon shoves him off and tells him to "come back when you become a true King."

After this incident, Kwon-yoo believes that he is the father of Hwa-yeon's child from the night they eloped together and has a change of heart about helping her, swearing to protect her and her son at any cost. In order to place his son on the throne and place a trap for the Queen Mother and King, Kwon-yoo turns on Minister Yoon by placing the poison in Sung-woo's medicinal drink. However, Kwon-yoo is left with no choice but to drink his own concoction to allay suspicion from Hwa-yeon and his child. After Kwon-yoo's violent reaction to the poisonous medicinal drink, the interrogated physician admits that Minister Yoon, who is directly beneath the Queen Mother, is head of medicine.

Hwa-yeon has sent her son away for his safety and been imprisoned by the Queen Mother, who charges Hwa-yeon with treason and orders Minister Yoon to end both the mother and son's life. Sung-won accuses his mother of trying to poison him, leading to her admission that she had poisoned the previous king to place Sung-won on the throne, which horrifies him since he had loved his brother and never desired to be king. Kwon-yoo and Minister Yoon are brought in to confirm or deny the plot to poison the current king. Keeping his promise to Hwa-yeon to protect her and her son, Kwon-yoo lies, saying the Queen Mother was behind Sung-woo's assassination attempt, with Minister Yoon providing the poison. Sung-woo orders the men's execution and for the Queen Mother to be permanently placed under house arrest in her chambers.

In a carriage heading towards his execution, Kwon-yoo says his goodbyes and asks Hwa-yeon to protect their son after he dies, but Hwa-yeon replies "Our son? The prince is no one's son. He is my son." Kwon-yoo is devastated he has sacrificed his life for Hwa-yeon's child, who may not be his own.

Sung-woo, now a true king, is greeted in his room by Hwa-yeon and the two engage in sexual intercourse before Hwa-yeon kills him. Queen Mother is quickly disposed of after him.

The last scene shows Hwa-yeon smiling at her son playing on the throne in the empty royal court, before her face turns when the door shuts and she realizes she can't go back.

== Cast ==
- Jo Yeo-jeong as Shin Hwa-yeon
- Kim Dong-wook as King / Grand Prince Sung-won
- Kim Min-joon as Kwon-Yoo / Choong-Young
- Park Ji-young as the Queen Mother (Daebi), Sung-won's mother
- Jo Eun-ji as Geum-ok, Hwa-yeon's maid
- Lee Geung-young as Chief eunuch Kim Gye-joo
- Park Chul-min as Pil-woon, a Pharmacy eunuch
- Ahn Suk-hwan as Officer Shin Ik-chul, Hwa-yeon's father
- Jo Gi-wang as Vice-Premier Yoon Jong-ho
- Oh Ji-hye as Court Lady Park
- Hong Kyung-yun as Court Lady Kim
- Park Chung-seon as Seung Jeon-saek
- Park Min-jung as the Queen Consort
- Kim Jwa-hyung as Geum-Goon
- Im Jong-yoon as the Left-State Councillor
- Lee Suk-gu as Go Won-ik
- Kwon Byung-gil as a servant
- Choi Woo-hyung as Sung-won's teacher
- Kim Soo-hyun as a palace maid
- Kim Woo-joo as Sang-Won
- Sa Gong-jin as Moo-Bong
- Moon Seung-hyuk as an eunuch
- Jang Ji-min as Palace woman 1
- Park Mi-ri as Palace woman 2
- Kim Hye-rim as settling palace woman 1
- Kim Sung-min as settling palace woman 2
- Hong Soo-ji as bathroom palace woman 1
- Lee Yoo-yi as bathroom palace woman 2
- Kang Hwa-sun as bathroom palace woman 3
- Yoo Jin-sun as bathroom palace woman 4
- Choi Jung-hyun as beaten eunuch 1
- Kim Hyo-min as beaten eunuch 2
- Do Mi-kyung as Shin Ik-chul's wife
- Jung Il-won as Mang Na-ni
- Kim Wang-geun as a butler
- Chae Dong-hyun as a Chief Military Eunuch
- No Ik-hyun as Lee Bong-soo
- Yang Hwan-oh
- Choi Eun
- Jung Joon-won as a Prince (just sound)

Special appearance

- Oh Hyun-kyung as Yoon Gi-hun
- Jung Chan as the former King
- Hong Yeo-jin as a Court Lady in Suragan
- Lee Yong-nyeo as an old woman
- Lee Yong-jik as an old woman

== Production ==
Asked about the most difficult scene in the movie, Jo Yeo-jeong said, "The last sex scene was really hard. I had to portray Hwa-yeon's desperate side because she's been waiting for that moment for so long. I discussed the scene with the director numerous times. The scene had to look tense and dramatic, so I even learned from a traditional Korean dancer how to move my body to add tense feelings to the scene."

== Critical reception ==
Reviews have been almost unanimously positive, with The Korea Times calling it "one of the best commercial films this year." Promotion and hype had singularly focused on the film's graphic portrayal of sex and Jo Yeo-jeong's nudity, which local critics found misguided and demeaning to a film that according to The Korea Herald "explores the theme of betrayal, revenge and obsessions, with much nuance and depth" and "offers substance and ample entertainment, as well as almost Shakespearean psychological intricacy." Despite "too many subplots which cause the narrative flow to be awkward at times," The Korea Times said it was an "intense, multi-textured journey that is certainly worth the effort", with "psychological depths that demand multiple viewings." Hwang Ki-seok's lush cinematography was praised, as were the costumes and the cast's excellent acting, particularly Kim Dong-wook's performance.

== Box office ==
Released on June 6, 2012, the film sold 1.4 million tickets in its first 10 days, and by the end of the month it had easily passed the 2 million admissions mark. The Korean Film Council reports that it sold more than 2.6 million tickets, making it the eleventh most watched Korean film of 2012.

Distribution rights have been signed with theaters in eight countries—New Zealand, Singapore, Hong Kong, Japan, Taiwan, Australia, Malaysia and Brunei.

== Awards and nominations ==
2012 21st Buil Film Awards

- Best Supporting Actress - Park Ji-young
- Nomination - Best Actress - Jo Yeo-jeong
- Nomination - Best Cinematography - Hwang Ki-seok
- Nomination - Best Art Direction - Cho Geun-hyun

2013 49th Baeksang Arts Awards

- Best Supporting Actress - Jo Eun-ji
