= Wuri's Family =

- Created by: Sin Hoo-geun
- Country of origin: South Korea
- Original language: Korean
- No. of episodes: 20

Production
- Running time: 55 minute

Original release
- Network: MBC TV
- Release: November 9, 2001 – March 29, 2002

Wuri's Family (aka My Home or Our House) was a popular South Korean household drama produced by JS Pictures for MBC. It aired from November 9, 2001, to March 29, 2002 for 20 episodes.

== Storyline ==
The story is mainly based on love triangle between Wuri (Kim Jae-won), Da-eun and Tae-hee. However it also covers the issue family and friendship.

Basically, the story is about two childhood best friends, Tae-hee and Wuri who have known each other since their childhood. Tae-hee secretly falls in love with Wuri. However, Wuri has always thought of her as his best friend and his love is only for a girl that he likes most as the first time he saw her namely Da-eun, a deaf and mute girl in university. Unfortunately, Tae-hee was upset and the mother of Wuri's family opposed their relationship.

== Cast ==
=== Wu-ri's house ===
- Kim Jaewon as Han Wu-ri (first son, 21)
- Park Sol-mi as Han Ha-na (oldest daughter, 28)
- Jae Hee as Han Gyo-rae (second son, 18)
- Joo Hyun as Han Man-su (father, 50)
- Park Won-sook as Han Eun-ja (mother, 50)
- Sa Mi-ja as Wu-ri's grandmother (70)

=== Neighbors ===
- Kim Hyo-jin as Kang Tae-hee (neighbor's daughter, 21)
- Kim Hyung-ja as Bae Dong-suk (neighbor, 50)

=== Other people ===
- Yuko Fueki as Do-yeon (21)
- Yoon Gi-won as Beom-Su (28)
- Kim Seung-min as Jae-Hwan (21)
- Kim Dong-hyun as Jong-In (21)
- Choi Joon-yong as Jo Sang-Ryong
- Kim Rae-won as Lee Young-hoon
- Kim Kang-woo

== See also ==
- List of Korean television shows
- Korean drama
- Contemporary culture of South Korea
