= Dead End (2013 film) =

- Korean: 데드엔드
- Directed by: Yoon Yeo-chang
- Release date: 14 November 2013 (South Korea)
- Running time: 96 minutes
- Country: South Korea
- Language: Korean

Dead End (Korean: 데드엔드) is a South Korean feature film. It was released on November 14, 2013. The director of this 96-minute mystery/thriller was Yoon Yeo-chang (윤여창). The lead is played by Kim Min-jun (김민준). Other cast members include Yoo Sang-jeon (우상전) and Choi Joon-yong (최준용).

== Plot ==
A movie producer has to leave the city because he had faked a documentary film. He winds up making a film the lives of ginseng harvesters, but even then problems ensue.

== Sources ==
- Dead End at HanCinema
