= Kim Min-jun (actor) =

South Korean actor (born 1976)

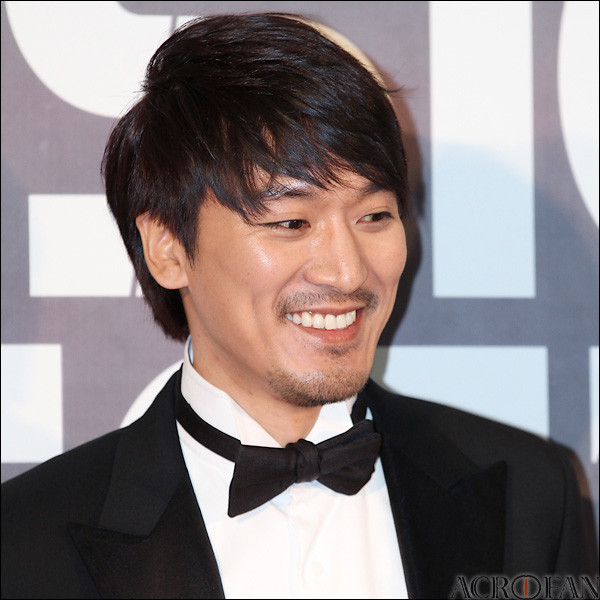
- Kim in February 2011
- Born: July 24, 1976 (age 50); South Korea
- Other name: Kim Min-joon
- Education: Dong-A University - Coaching Guidance
- Occupation: Actor
- Years active: 2003–present
- Agent: Family Ent.
- Spouse: Kwon Da-mi (m. 2019)
- Children: 2

Korean name
- Hangul: 김민준
- Hanja: 金敏俊
- RR: Gim Minjun
- MR: Kim Minjun

Kim Min-jun (Korean: 김민준; born July 24, 1976) is a South Korean actor.

== Career ==
Kim began his career as a model, then made a memorable acting debut as the rebel leader in Damo. He alternates playing romantic leads (In-soon is Pretty, Surgeon Bong Dal-hee, Romance Town, Beloved) with playing villains (A Love, Tazza, Hindsight).

Under the name "DJ Vesper MJ," Kim has also been active as a club DJ since 2009.

On December 20, 2012, Kim announced on his Twitter that he would be taking a temporary hiatus from acting. He returned to the entertainment scene three months later when actor Park Joong-hoon cast him in his directorial debut Top Star.

In late 2013, he joined the reality/variety show I Live Alone, as well as the multicultural children's travelogue Coo Coo Class.

== Personal life ==
Kim married on October 11, 2019 to designer Kwon Da-mi, who is the elder sister of G-Dragon. Their first child, a son, was born on 4 February 2022. He welcomed his second child in 2026.

== Filmography ==
=== Film ===
Year	Title	Role	Notes	Ref.
2003	A Man Who Went to Mars			
2004	Never to Lose			
2006	No Mercy for the Rude	"Ballet"		
2007	A Love	Chi-gwon		
2010	Camellia "Iron Pussy: A Kimchi Affair"		omnibus	
2011	Pained		Cameo	
2011	Hindsight	K		
2011	The Depths			
2012	Wedding Scandal			
2012	The Concubine	Kwon-Yoo / Choong-Young		
2013	Dead End			
2013	Top Star	Won-joon		
2015	Five Senses of Love			
2016	Musudan			
2017	Miss Butcher			
2020	Singer			
2024	Exhuma	Japanese ghost		

=== Television series ===
Year	Title	Role	Ref.
2003	Damo	Jang Jae-mo / Jang Sung-baek	
2004	Ireland	Lee Jae-bok	
2004	Into the Storm		
2005	Lovers in Prague	Ji Young-woo	
2006	Someday		
2007	In-soon Is Pretty		
2007	Surgeon Bong Dal-hee	Lee Geon-wook	
2007	Salt Doll		
2008	Tazza	Young-min	
2008	On Air	Himself (Cameo)	
2009	Friend, Our Legend	Lee Joon-seok	
2011	Romance Town	Kim Young-hee	
2012	To My Beloved	Choi Eun-hyuk	
2014	Schoolgirl Detectives	Ha Yeon-joon	
2015	Hidden Identity	Teacher Jeong	
2016	One More Happy Ending	Lee Wook	
2016	Babysitter	Lee Sang-won	
2017	My Sassy Girl	Prince Joo Sung	
2017	Hwarang: The Poet Warrior Youth	Wideok of Baekje	
2020	Was It Love?	Goo Pa-do	
2022	Island	groom (Cameo)	
2023	Durian's Affair	Dan Chi-gam	

=== Variety show ===
- 2 Days & 1 Night (KBS, 2015)
- Coo Coo Class (tvN, 2013–2014)
- I Live Alone (MBC, 2013–2014)
- Homme 4.0 (XTM, 2012)
- The Duet (MBN, 2012)
- Homme 3.0 (XTM, 2011)
- 2010 World Cup Special - Waving the Taegukgi (SBS, 2010)
- Family Outing (SBS, 2009)

=== Music video ===
Year	Title	Artist(s)	Ref.
2007	"But We Loved" Part 2	Lyn	
2011	"Walk to Heaven"	The One	
2014	"사과"	Bobby Kim	

== Awards ==
- 2011 5th Mnet 20's Choice Awards: Hot Trendy Guy
- 2008 17th Buil Film Awards: Best Supporting Actor (A Love)
- 2004 40th Baeksang Arts Awards: Best New Actor, TV (Damo)
- 2003 MBC Drama Awards: Best New Actor (Damo)
