= Yeo Jin-goo filmography =

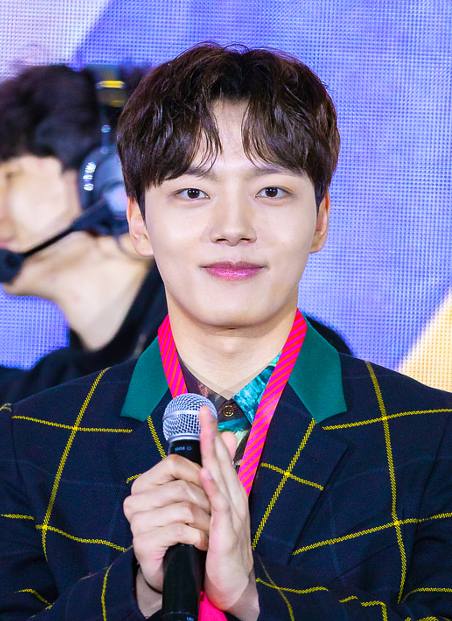
- Yeo in 2019
- Film: 15
- Television series: 25
- Television show: 5
- Web show: 1
- Music videos: 2
- Narrating: 10

Yeo Jin-goo is a South Korean actor. Yeo began his career as child actor, debuting in the film Sad Movie (2005). Nicknamed "Nation's Little Brother", he went on to play the younger version of the lead roles in movies and television dramas such as A Frozen Flower (2008), Giant (2010), Moon Embracing the Sun (2012), and Missing You (2012). He is known for playing the title character in action thriller Hwayi: A Monster Boy (2013), for which he won Best New Actor at the Blue Dragon Film Awards.

Since then, he has taken on lead roles in the films Shoot Me in the Heart (2015), The Long Way Home (2015), and Warriors of the Dawn (2017). He has also starred in the dramas Orange Marmalade (2015), The Royal Gambler (2016), Circle (2017), Reunited Worlds (2017), The Crowned Clown (2019), My Absolute Boyfriend (2019), Hotel Del Luna (2019), and Beyond Evil (2021).

== Film ==
Year	Title	Role	Notes	Ref.
2005	Sad Movie	Park Hwi-chan		
2006	Sa-kwa	young boy		
2006	No Mercy for the Rude	young killer		
2007	Dance of the Dragon	young Kwon Tae-san		
2008	Santamaria	Kang Da-seong		
2008	Antique	young Kim Jin-hyuk		
2008	A Frozen Flower	young Hong-rim		
2013	Sky Force 3D	Ace (voice)	Korean dub	
2013	Hwayi: A Monster Boy	Hwa-yi		
2014	Mr. Perfect	Lee Byung-joo		
2014	Tazza: The Hidden Card	Agui's pupil	Cameo	
2015	Shoot Me in the Heart	Lee Soo-myung		
2015	The Long Way Home	Kim Yeong-gwang		
2017	Warriors of the Dawn	Gwanghaegun		
2017	1987: When the Day Comes	Park Jong-chul	Cameo	
2022	Ajoomma	Yeo Jin-goo	Cameo	
2022	Ditto	Kim Yong		
2023	Noryang: Deadly Sea	Yi Myeon	Cameo	
2024	Hijack 1971	Yong Dae		

== Television series ==
Year	Title	Role	Notes	Ref.
2006	I Want to Love	Baek Min-hyung		
2006	Yeon Gaesomun	young Kim Heum-soon		
2007	Queen of the Game	young Lee Shin-jeon		
2008	Iljimae	young Lee Gyeom		
2008	Tazza	young Kim Gon		
2008	Gourmet	Hotae		
2009	Can Anyone Love?	Lee Poo-reum-chan		
2009	Ja Myung Go	young Hodong		
2009	Swallow the Sun	young Kim Jung-woo		
2010	The Reputable Family	young Choi Guk-seon		
2010	Giant	young Lee Kang-mo		
2011	Warrior Baek Dong-soo	young Baek Dong-soo		
2011	Deep Rooted Tree	teenage Ddol-bok		
2012	Moon Embracing the Sun	young Lee Hwon		
2012	Missing You	young Han Jung-woo		
2013	Potato Star 2013QR3	Hong Hye-sung / Noh Jun-hyuk		
2015	Orange Marmalade	Jung Jae-min		
2016	The Royal Gambler	Prince Yeon-ing		
2017	Circle	Kim Woo-jin		
2017	Reunited Worlds	Sung Hae-sung		
2019	The Crowned Clown	Lee Heon / Ha Seon		
2019	My Absolute Boyfriend	Young Goo		
2019	Hotel del Luna	Goo Chan-sung		
2020	Start-Up	Jang Young-shil (voice only) / Hong Ji-suk	Cameo (episode 16)	
2021	Beyond Evil	Han Joo-won		
2022	Link: Eat, Love, Kill	Eun Gye-hoon		

== Television shows ==
Year	Title	Role	Notes	Ref.
2012	I'm Real, Yeo Jingoo in Italy			
2016	Giving From Jingoo Oppa		A 2-episode documentary for TOMS Giving Project	
2018	4 Wheeled Restaurant	Cast member	Season 1	
2020	House on Wheels	Cast member	Season 1	
2021	Girls Planet 999	Host		
2023	Boys Planet	Star master	Episode 5	

== Web shows ==
Year	Title	Role	Notes	Ref.
2023	Bros On Foot	Cast Member	with Ju Ji-hoon, Ha Jung-woo, and Choi Min-ho	

== Narration ==
Year	Title	Notes	Ref.
2010	United Reporter! Goes to Unification of Germany	Presentation and narration	
2011	United Reporter! Goes to Transformation of Countries in Eastern Europe (Hungary portion)	Presentation and narration	
2012	New Life for Children	Narration	
2014	Help for the Children in Myanmar, Hand of Hope to Hold on	Narration	
2014	Uigwe, the 8-Day Festival in 3D; Theatrical version	Narration	
2015	Marine Documentary, Sharks	Narration	
2016	SBS Special: Graduation - The Youths Who Cannot Leave School	Narration	
2016	Miss Peregrine's Home for Peculiar Children (Korea Release Promotion)	Narration (Korean Novel)	
2017	Animal Farm	Narration (Episode 800)	
2021	Docu Insight: Red Earth	Narration	

== Music video appearances ==
Year	Title	Artist	Ref.
2012	"I Need You"	K.Will	
2014	"Still in Love"	Baek Ji-young	
