= Welcome Back to School =

- Genre: Variety
- Written by: Kang Young-mi; Kim Min-ju; Im Yun-jeong; Kim Yun-mi; Lee Joo-yeon; Kang Ji-na; Kim Hyo-seon; Jang So-young; Jo Eun-jeong
- Starring: Kang-nam, Kim Jeong-hoon
- Country of origin: South Korea
- Original language: Korean
- No. of episodes: 68

Production
- Producers: Kim No-eun; Choi Chang-soo; Jung Seung-il; Jung Jae-hoon; Moon Min-jeong; Ko Hye-jin
- Production location: South Korea
- Running time: approximately 70 minutes per episode

Original release
- Network: JTBC
- Release: July 12, 2014 – November 3, 2015

Welcome Back to School (Note: Also known as Off to School, I'm Going to School, Oh, I'll Go to School, and Going to School.) (Korean: 학교 다녀오겠습니다) was a 2014 South Korean variety program where celebrities attended a selected high school as students for 3 days. It starred M.I.B's Kang-nam and Kim Jeong-hoon as fixed members. Despite a few changes in its time slot over the show's history, it aired on JTBC on Tuesdays at 9:30 pm KST from July 12, 2014 to November 3, 2015.

== Episode summary ==
Episodes	Date	School	Cast members
1–5	July 12, 2014–August 9, 2014	Sunjung High School	Sung Dong-il, Yoon Do-hyun, Nam Joo-hyuk, Brian Joo, Hye-rim Park, Kim Jong-min, Heo Ga-yoon (4Minute), Kang-jun (C-Clown)
6–9	August 16, 2014–September 6, 2014	Shinjang High School	Sung Dong-il, Yoon Do-hyun, Nam Joo-hyuk, Brian Joo, Hye-rim Park, Kim Jong-min, Hong Eun-hee, Jo Kwon (2AM)
10–14	September 13, 2014–October 11, 2014	Incheon Foreign Language High School	Sung Dong-il, Yoon Do-hyun, Nam Joo-hyuk, Kang-nam (M.I.B), Oh Sang-jin, Heo Ji-woong
15–18	October 18, 2014–November 8, 2014	High School Attached to the Education College of Inha University	Sung Dong-il, Yoon Do-hyun, Nam Joo-hyuk, Kang-nam (M.I.B), Park Myeong-su, Enes Kaya, Julian Quintart
19–22	November 15, 2014–December 6, 2014	Ilsan Daejin High School	Sung Dong-il, Yoon Do-hyun, Nam Joo-hyuk, Kang-nam (M.I.B), Lee Jong-hyuk, Jang Ki-ha, Han Sang-jin
23–25	December 13, 2014–December 27, 2014	Korea University High School	Sung Dong-il, Yoon Do-hyun, Nam Joo-hyuk, Kang-nam (M.I.B), Lee Jong-hyuk, Bobby Kim, Jingo (Super Kidd)
26	January 3, 2015	Kang-nam & Joo-hyuk Couple Special	Nam Joo-hyuk, Kang-nam (M.I.B)
27–29	January 10, 2015–January 24, 2015	Hanyang Technical High School	Sung Dong-il, Yoon Do-hyun, Nam Joo-hyuk, Kang-nam (M.I.B), Jeong Jun-ha, Jo Dong-hyuk, Jang Ki-yong
30–33	February 3, 2015–February 24, 2015	Seogwipo Industry Science High School	Sung Dong-il, Nam Joo-hyuk, Kang-nam (M.I.B), Kim Hee-won, Lee Kyu-han, Lee Jung-shin (CNBLUE)
34–35	March 3, 2015–March 10, 2015	Hawaiian Mission Academy	Nam Joo-hyuk, Kang-nam (M.I.B)
36–39	March 17, 2015–April 7, 2015	Gwacheon Foreign Language High School	Nam Joo-hyuk, Kang-nam (M.I.B), Jun Hyun-moo, Ha-ni (EXID), Kang Yong-suk, Eun Ji-won, Kang Gyun-sung (Noel), Ji-min (AOA)
40–43	April 14, 2015–May 5, 2015	Gyeonggi Arts High School	Kang-nam (M.I.B), Eun Ji-won, Tae-min (SHINee), Yura (Girls' Day), Ga-in (Brown Eyed Girls), Lee Ah-hyun, Kang Seul-gi (Red Velvet), Huh Gak, Jo Young-nam
44–46	May 12, 2015–June 2, 2015	Han-min High School	Kang-nam (M.I.B), Kim Soo-ro, Kim Sung-joo (UNIQ), Hyo-sung (Secret), Yoon So-hee, San E, Hong Jin-kyung, Kim Bum-soo (announcer)
47–50	June 9, 2015–June 30, 2015	Goyang Global High School	Kang-nam (M.I.B), Lena Park, Son Ho-jun, Kim Jeong-hoon, Ahn Nae-sang, Oh Jung-yeon, Seung-hee (DIA)
51–52	July 7, 2015–July 14, 2015	Jeju Hanlim High School	Kang-nam (M.I.B), Kim Jeong-hoon, Kim Bum-soo (announcer), Jin-woon (2AM)
53–56	July 21, 2015–August 11, 2015	Hyundai Chungun High School	Kang-nam (M.I.B), Kim Jeong-hoon, N (VIXX), Jung Eun-ji (Apink), Go Joo-won, Ricky Kim, Kang Seung-hyun
57–58	August 18, 2015–August 25, 2015	Tokyo Korean School	Kang-nam (M.I.B), Kim Jeong-hoon, Jeong Jun-ha, Shim Hyung-tak
59–62	September 1, 2015–September 22, 2015	Seo Incheon High School	Kang-nam (M.I.B), Kim Jeong-hoon, Hong Jin-ho, Han Seung-yeon (KARA), Shin Soo-ji, Choo Sung-hoon, Shaquille O'Neal
63–65	September 29, 2015–October 13, 2015	Gimpo Jeil High School	Kang-nam (M.I.B), Kim Jeong-hoon, Pyo Chang-won, Kim Young-ho, Lee Ki-chan, Kim Yoo-mi, Kim Nam-joo (Apink)
66–68	October 20, 2015–November 3, 2015	Cheongshim International Academy	Kang-nam (M.I.B), Kim Jeong-hoon, Lee Jun-seok, Sam Hammington, Fujii Mina, Yenny (Wonder Girls), Heyne
