= Kwon Jong-gwan =

South Korean director, screenwriter and filmmaker

- Born: 1972 (age 53–54); South Korea
- Education: Kyung Hee University (Bachelor of Literature)
- Occupations: Film director; screenwriter
- Years active: 1997 to present

Korean name
- Hangul: 권종관
- RR: Gwon Jonggwan
- MR: Kwŏn Chonggwan

Kwon Jong-gwan (Korean: 권종관) is a South Korean filmmaker. He is known for directing the feature films S Diary (2004), Sad Movie (2005), and Proof of Innocence (2016).

== Career ==
Kwon Jong-gwan graduated from Kyung Hee University with a degree in Korean Language and Literature. He received recognition for his debut short films October 28, 1979 and A Sunny Sunday (1999), which were selected for various film festivals. The short film won the Best Film award in the Wide Angel section at the Busan International Film Festival and the 37th Grand Bell Award for Short Film.

In 2001, He achieved a milestone by winning the Grand Bell Award for Short Film for two consecutive years with his subsequent short film Uncle 'Bar' At Barbershop at the 38th Grand Bell Award. This short was also invited to the San Diego Asian Film Festival.

His feature-length debut was S Diary, starring Kim Sun-a and Kim Soo-ro. This was followed by another feature film, Sad Movie (2005), which tells the heartbreaking breakup stories of three couples who are in love but are forced to part ways. The film featured a star-studded cast including Jung Woo-sung, Im Soo-jung, Yum Jung-ah, Yeo Jin-goo, Cha Tae-hyun, Shin Min-a, and Lee Ki-woo.

In 2009, Kwon joined "Short! Short! Short!", a Korean short film production project that started in 2007. To celebrate its 10th anniversary, the Jeonju International Film Festival released an omnibus digital feature film comprising 10 short films, with the theme of "money,":each around 10 minutes in length. Titled Show Me the Money. Kwon's short film is called "Coin Boy."

In 2015, he returned with Proof of Innocence as both director and screenwriter. Originally titled Letter from Prison, the film featured a cast of seasoned actors such as Kim Myung-min, Kim Young-ae, Sung Dong-il, and Kim Sang-ho, along with Park Hyuk-kwon, Shin Goo, Lee Moon-sik, and Kim Roi-ha, known as the "Avengers of the Middle-Aged".

== Filmography ==
=== Film ===
Year	Title		Role	Note	Ref.
Year	English	Korean	Role	Note	Ref.
1997	Baby Sale	베이비 세일	Production team		
1998	Whispering Corridors	여고괴담	Production team		
1999	October 28, 1979, A Sunny Sunday	1979년 10월 28일 일요일 맑음	Director, Screenwriter	Short film, directorial debut	
2000	Uncle 'Bar' At Barbershop	이발소 이씨	Director, Screenwriter	Short film	
2004	S Diary	S 다이어리	Director, Screenwriter		
2005	Sad Movie	새드무비	Director, Screenwriter		
2009	Show Me the Money segment: Coin Boy	동전 모으는 소년 — 황금시대	Director, Screenwriter	Anthology of Short film from 10 Directors (Note: Kwon Jong-gwan, Kim Seong-ho, Kim Young-nam, Kim Eun-kyung, Nam Da-jeong, Yang Hae-hoon, Yoon Seong-ho, Lee Song-hee-il, Chae Gi, Choi Ik-hwan)	
2016	Proof of Innocence	특별수사: 사형수의 편지	Director		

=== Television ===
Key
†	Denotes television productions that have not yet been released

Year	Title		Role	Note	Ref.
Year	English	Korean	Role	Note	Ref.
2025	The Price of Confession	자백의 대가	Screenwriter	Netflix original series	
2027	My Ghostly Running Mate †	의원님이 보우하사	Screenwriter		

== Awards and nominations ==
Year presented, name of the award ceremony, category, nominated work, and the result of the nomination
Year	Award	Category	Nominated Work	Result	Ref.
Baeksang Arts Awards	2026	Best Screenplay – Television	The Price of Confession	Nominated	
Busan International Film Festival	1999	Wide Angle Category Best Film Award	October 28, 1979, A Sunny Sunday	Won	
Jeju Shinyoung Film Festival	1999	Excellence Award	October 28, 1979, A Sunny Sunday	Won	
Global OTT Awards	2026	Best Writer	The Price of Confession	Won	
Grand Bell Awards	2000	Best Short Film	October 28, 1979, A Sunny Sunday	Won	
Grand Bell Awards	2001	Best Short Film	Uncle 'Bar' At Barbershop	Won	
2nd Korea Film Festival	2001	Excellence Award	Uncle 'Bar' At Barbershop	Won	
