= Mun Che-yong =

South Korean filmmaker (born 1979)

- Born: 1979 (age 46–47); South Korea
- Occupations: Film director screenwriter

Korean name
- Hangul: 문제용
- RR: Mun Jeyong
- MR: Mun Cheyong

Mun Che-yong (Korean: 문제용; born 1979) is a South Korean film director and screenwriter. Mun was assistant director of the films All for Love (2005) and Tazza: The High Rollers (2006). His directorial debut Shoot Me in the Heart (2015), starring Lee Min-ki and Yeo Jin-goo, is based on the award-winning novelist Jeong Yu-jeong's bestselling novel of the same name. The film was invited to the 28th Tokyo International Film Festival in 2015. His short film Twins (2007) won the Best Film in A Short Film About Love at the 2007 Mise-en-scène Short Film Festival.

== Filmography ==
- Self Portrait (short film, 2002) – director
- Mother, Beauitiful May (2003) – actor
- Life goes (short film, 2003) – sound
- Please Stay with Me (short film, 2004) – director, screenwriter, music
- All for Love (2005) – assistant director
- The Art of Seduction (2005) – directing dept
- Tazza: The High Rollers (2006) – assistant director
- Twins (short film, 2007) – director, screenwriter, storyboard
- A Man Who Was Superman (2008) – directing dept, 2nd unit production
- The King of XXX-Kissing (2012) – scenario team
- Shoot Me in the Heart (2015) – director, screenwriter
