= Orange Marmalade (webtoon) =

2011–2013 South Korean webtoon

오렌지 마말레이드 RR: Orenji mamalleideu MR: Orenji mamalleidŭ
- Genre: Romance
- Author: Seok-woo
- Publisher: (South Korea) Semicolon
- English publisher: Webtoon
- Magazine: (South Korea) Naver Webtoon
- Original run: 2011–2013
- Collected volumes: 8

Orange Marmalade (TV series)

Orange Marmalade (Korean: 오렌지 마말레이드) is a South Korean manhwa written and illustrated by Seok-woo. It was adapted into a Korean drama of the same name in 2015.

== Plot ==
Vampires were once hunted to near extinction, but a peace treaty between humans and vampires has maintained peace for the past 200 years. Vampires now live among humans, concealing their identities and surviving on pig's blood. However, they retain their predatory instincts and continue to crave human blood.

Baek Ma-ri is a vampire who tries to conceal her identity from the world. Seeing vampires as monsters, the humans kept them away and wish that they would die out already. However, one day, Jae-min's sweet-smelling blood made Ma-ri lose control of herself, resulting in a new sweet beginning.

== Characters ==
- Baek Ma-ri

The female protagonist of the story, Ma-ri is a vampire trying to conceal her real identity from the world. In the beginning, Ma-ri was shown to be reserved and emotionless person.

- Jung Jae-min

The male protagonist of the story, Jae-min is a charming boy who is good at basketball. He is one of the most popular boys in school but cares the least. Jae-min is shown as a misogynist but the reason is not that he really hates women. In reality, he their touch as it reminds him of his stepmother who used to beat him up for everything.

- Jung Soo-ri

Soo-ri is Ma-ri's first friend. Initially not thinking much about Ma-ri, she became entranced by her guitar playing after witnessing it by chance, and persistently tries to get her to join the band club. Soo-ri was originally openly hostile about vampires, even trash-talking about them in front of Ma-ri while having no idea she was a vampire. After Ma-ri saves her life, getting injured in the process, Soo-ri's entire opinion of vampires is changed and she becomes protective of her.

- Do Woo-mi

Woo-mi is Ma-ri's second friend via Soo-ri. When she found out Ma-ri was a vampire, she accepted her without hesitation.

- Jo Ah-ra

The antagonist of the story, Ah-ra saw Ma-ri as her rival for Jae-min. She constantly tried to intimidate Ma-ri, but her attempts failed.

- Han Si-hoo

Si-hoo is Ma-ri's fiancé who was later introduced in the story. Due to the shortage of vampires, the two of them were arranged to be married since they were both juvenile. He is egoistic and does not trust humans at all, believing they are nothing more than food and that no human – not even Ma-ri's friends – will ever accept vampires or that that will ever change.

- Ha Na-bi

Na-bi is Ma-ri's aunt. She owns a cafe where Ma-ri sometimes sings and plays guitar. She is friends with Jae-min's mother.

== Development ==
Seok Woo launched his career with the webtoon Nostalgia in 2008, followed by the webtoons 17 Years Old, That Summer Day's Miracle, Days of Hana, and She's Hopeless. At the Popcon Asia festival in Jakarta, he staid: "I didn't know how to make friends so I spent most time alone. By drawing comics, I could pour my heart out." Seok continued creating webtoons despite his parents' disapproval, and went on to study animation in university.

=== Live-action drama ===
A 12-episode South Korean live-action drama based on the series began airing on KBS2 on May 15, 2015. The series is co-directed by Lee Hyung-min and Choi Sung-bum, and stars Yeo Jin-goo as Jae-min, Kim Seol-hyun as Ma-ri, and Lee Jong-hyun as Si-hoo.

== Reception ==
Soon after Webtoon was released in Indonesia in April 2015, Orange Marmalade became the most popular webtoon in the country.
