= The Price of Confession =

2025 South Korean television series

- Promotional poster
- Hangul: 자백의 대가
- RR: Jabaegui daega
- MR: Chabaegŭi taeka
- Genre: Mystery; Thriller
- Written by: Kwon Jong-gwan
- Directed by: Lee Jung-hyo
- Starring: Jeon Do-yeon; Kim Go-eun; Park Hae-soo; Jin Seon-kyu
- Music by: Nam Hye-seung
- Country of origin: South Korea
- Original language: Korean
- No. of episodes: 12

Production
- Running time: 46~60 minutes
- Production companies: Studio Dragon; Production H

Original release
- Network: Netflix
- Release: December 5, 2025

The Price of Confession (Korean: 자백의 대가) is a 2025 South Korean mystery thriller television series written by Kwon Jong-kwan, directed by Lee Jung-hyo, and starring Jeon Do-yeon, Kim Go-eun, Park Hae-soo, and Jin Seon-kyu. This drama tells the story of Yoon-soo, who is suspected of murdering her husband, and Mo-eun, a mysterious figure known as a witch, who become embroiled in a dangerous deal.

== Plot ==
An Yoon-soo, a high school art teacher, discovers her husband Ki-dae, a respected freelance painter, dead in his private studio. The crime scene shows signs of deliberate tampering, with key evidence destroyed. With no signs of forced entry and no clear suspects, investigators focus on Yoon-soo. Prosecutor Baek Dong-hun, a former detective who relies on behavioral analysis, forms an early suspicion that Yoon-soo is responsible and proceeds with indictment despite the absence of direct physical evidence.

Months later, a married dentist couple is found poisoned in their home. The suspect, Mo-eun, is arrested at the scene and immediately confesses without a remorse. She is imprisoned in the same facility as Yoon-soo and proposes a deal: she will confess to Ki-dae’s murder in exchange for Yoon-soo killing Se-hun, the dentists’ son, whom she claims she failed to eliminate.

Mo-eun’s confession in court includes detailed knowledge of Ki-dae’s death, weakening the prosecution’s case and leading to Yoon-soo’s release on bail under electronic monitoring. Prosecutors, however, remain doubtful and begins secretly investigating possible conspiracy between the two women.

Baek subsequently exposes Mo-eun’s true identity as Kang So-hae, a former medical doctor, who had assumed Mo-eun’s identity after her death while volunteering in Thailand.

Se-hun lives under the supervision of his grandfather, Ko Dong-uk. Under intense pressure from Mo-eun, Yoon-soo approaches Se-hun but ultimately warns him instead of killing him. To mislead Mo-eun, she stages photographic evidence suggesting Se-hun’s death. Mo-eun rejects the image, having already received separate proof of Se-hun’s death prior to Yoon-soo. Shortly afterward, Se-hun is found dead in his family home, a development that shocks both Yoon-soo and investigators.

Forensic evidence once again implicates Yoon-soo. Ko Dong-uk, devastated by his grandson’s death, abducts Yoon-soo’s daughter in an attempt to force a confession. Baek intensifies his investigation, maintaining his suspicion of Yoon-soo despite emerging irregularities in the case.

Further inquiry reveals that Mo-eun’s lawyer, Jin Yeong-in, and his wife Choi Su-yeon had been monitoring communications between Mo-eun and Yoon-soo by exploiting Jin’s access as legal counsel. After learning that Se-hun was kept alive by Yoon-soon, Jin and Choi kill him to ensure Yoon-soo would be implicated.

In flashbacks, Se-hun sexually assaulted So-hae’s younger sister years ago. When video evidence of the assault became public during legal proceedings, the resulting stigma led both her sister and father to die by suicide. So-hae’s actions are revealed to be part of a deliberate revenge plan.

Meanwhile, Yoon-soo identifies inconsistencies in Ki-dae’s death. At a university exhibition of his final artwork, she discovers a second fingerprint besides hers embedded in the paint. The evidence links Ki-dae’s murder to a plagiarism dispute involving Jin and Choi. Flashbacks show that Choi killed Ki-dae in anger over the accusation, with Jin assisting in concealing the crime.

Yoon-soo and So-hae confront Jin at Ki-dae’s studio to recover the original artwork containing the fingerprint evidence on main etching. Jin attempts to kill them to prevent exposure. During the ensuing struggle, So-hae is fatally wounded but kills Jin before dying.

Although Choi attributes the murders to her husband during proceedings, Baek continues to examine her role. Yoon-soo is ultimately cleared of the murder charges, while Choi’s final legal outcome remains unspecified. The series concludes with Yoon-soo traveling to Thailand with her daughter to visit a mountain location that was So-hae’s favorite place.

== Cast and characters ==
=== Main ===
- Jeon Do-yeon as Ahn Yoon-soo, a high school art teacher and wife of Ki-dae
- Kim Go-eun as Mo-eun / Kang So-hae / "the Witch", a former medical professional living under an assumed identity
- Park Hae-soo as Baek Dong-hun, a former detective turned prosecutor
- Jin Seon-kyu as Jang Jung-gu, Yoon-soo's defense attorney

=== Recurring ===
- Choi Young-joon as Jin Yeong-in, Mo-eun’s lawyer and a law professor
- Lee Sang-hee as Bae Sun-deok, a pregnant probation officer
- Lee Kyu-hoe as Ko Dong-uk, a retired colonel and Se-hun’s grandfather
- Jung Woon-sun as Choi Su-yeon, a cellist and Jin Yeong-in’s wife
- Kim Gook-hee as Um Ju-yeong, a correctional officer
- Lee Ha-yool as Lee Ki-dae, Yoon-soo’s deceased husband
- Lee Jae-in as Koo Hui-yeong, an inmate and acquaintance of Kang So-mang
- Lee Cho-hee as Ryu Ji-su, a violent crimes detective
- Seo Eun-young as Oh Seo-won, Ki-dae’s former student and mistress
- Hwang Hee as the prison doctor
- Lee Chae-yu as Lee Sop, the daughter of Ki-dae and Yoon-soo
- Kim Sun-young as Walsun, a fellow inmate of Yoon-soo and Mo-eun
- Nam Da-reum as Ko Se-hun, the teenage son of the murdered dentists
- Nam Jin-bok as Hong Se-yeong, a journalist
- Kim Joong-don as Detective Nam
- Kim Sang-ji as Mo-eun, So-hae’s deceased friend

== Production ==
=== Development ===
The Price of Confession was produced by Studio Dragon and written by Kwon Jong-kwan, who had also written Sad Movie (2005) and Proof of Innocence (2016). It was supposed to be directed by Lee Eung-bok, who helmed Mr. Sunshine (2018), Sweet Home (2020–2023), and Jirisan (2021).

In January 2023, Lee had withdrawn from the drama due to scheduling conflicts with the ongoing production of the second and final seasons of Sweet Home. Studio Dragon clarified that Lee was only being considered and had not been officially confirmed as director of the series. The next month, Shim Na-yeon was expected to take on the role of director but decided not to take part after discussions. In December 2023, Lee Jung-hyo had been confirmed to direct the series after production delays, marking his return to the thriller genre in six years since the 2018 OCN drama Life on Mars. Production H would also be producing the series.

In July 2024, Netflix announced that the production began and they would distribute the series globally on their platform.

=== Casting ===
In August 2022, Song Hye-kyo and Han So-hee were both in talks to star in the drama, and each of their respective agencies had confirmed that the project was under consideration. In May 2023, both actors decided to withdraw from the series due to creative differences with the production team.

In December 2023, Jeon Do-yeon was cast as the new lead actor. The next month, Kim Ji-won was reportedly in final talks but decided to not join. On January 17, it was reported that Kim Go-eun has been cast, marking Kim and Jeon's second collaboration since the 2015 film Memories of the Sword.

In April 2024, Park Hae-soo was reportedly cast as the male lead. Both Park and Jeon also collaborated in the play The Cherry Orchard at LG Art Center Seoul. In June 2024, both Jin Seon-kyu and Choi Young-joon joined the cast.

In January 2025, Nam Da-reum has been cast to appear.

== Release ==
In February 2025, Netflix revealed that The Price of Confession is part of the 2025 lineup of Korean films and television series, and was scheduled to be released at the fourth quarter of 2025. In November 2025, Netflix confirmed the release date of the series to be December 5, 2025.

== Reception ==
=== Critical response ===
On the review aggregator website Rotten Tomatoes, 80% of 5 critics' reviews are positive, with an average rating of 6.6/10.

=== Accolades ===
Award ceremony	Year	Category	Recipient(s)	Result	Ref.
Baeksang Arts Awards	2026	Best Screenplay	Kwon Jong-gwan	Nominated	
Chunsa Film Art Awards	2025	Best Acting in the OTT	Kim Go-eun	Won	
