= Gil Eun-hye =

South Korean actress (born 1988)

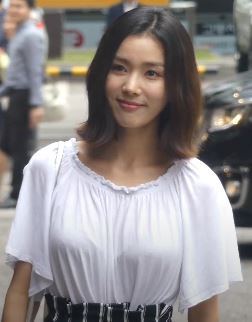
- Gil in 2019
- Born: October 5, 1988 (age 38); Busan, South Korea
- Education: Konkuk University – Arts and Film Major
- Occupation: Actress
- Years active: 1999–present
- Agent: Tan Entertainment

Korean name
- Hangul: 길은혜
- RR: Gil Eunhye
- MR: Kil Ŭnhye

Gil Eun-hye (Korean: 길은혜; born October 5, 1988) is a South Korean actress. She appeared in the 2015 television drama series Orange Marmalade.

== Filmography ==
=== Television ===
- School 2013 (KBS2 / 2012–2013) – Gil Eun-hye (student)
- Nail Shop Paris (MBC QueeN, 2013)
- The Noblesse (JTBC, 2013–2014) – So-ra
- Rosy Lovers (MBC / 2014–2015) – Joo-young
- Orange Marmalade (KBS2 / 2015) – Jo A-ra
- Temperature of Love (SBS / 2017) – Lee Hyun-yi
- Coffee, Do Me a Favor (Channel A / 2018–2019) – Kang Ye-na
- Angel's Last Mission (KBS2 / 2019) – Geum Ru Na
- The Secret Romantic Guesthouse (SBS / 2023) – Gwiin Park

=== Film ===
- Tell Me Something (1999) – Soo-yeon (young)
- Roommates (2006)
- Mother (2009)
- Little Black Dress (2011) – assistant writer
- Horror Stories 2 (2013)
- There Is No Antidote (2013)
