= My Ghostly Running Mate =

Upcoming South Korean television series

- Hangul: 의원님이 보우하사
- Lit.: May the Congressman Protect You
- RR: Uiwonnimi bouhasa
- MR: Ŭiwŏnnimi pouhasa
- Genre: Political drama; Fantasy
- Based on: May the Congressman Protect You by Kim Hyun-bin
- Written by: Kwon Jong-gwan
- Directed by: Park Shin-woo
- Starring: Kim Yoon-seok; Kim Seon-ho; Ryu Kyung-soo
- Country of origin: South Korea
- Original language: Korean

Production
- Executive producers: Jang Kyung-ik; Lee Yoo-jin
- Production companies: Studio Dragon; Zip Cinema

Original release
- Network: tvN

My Ghostly Running Mate (Korean: 의원님이 보우하사) is an upcoming South Korean political fantasy television series written by Kwon Jong-gwan and directed by Park Shin-woo. The series stars Kim Yoon-seok and Kim Seon-ho. Based on the Kakao page web novel of the same name by Kim Hyun-bin, it is scheduled to premiere on tvN.

== Premise ==
Primarily set in 1998, the narrative follows Gu Young-jin, a seasoned six-term politician who dies and travels ten years into the past as a ghost. He connects with Cha Jae-rim, a Grade 9 civil servant and the only person capable of seeing him. Persuaded by Young-jin, Jae-rim enters the political arena, and the two form an unlikely team to challenge corrupt figures within the National Assembly in Yeouido.

== Cast ==
=== Main ===
- Kim Yoon-seok as Gu Young-jin

Six-term congressman who took his own life in 2008 and awake in 1998 as a ghost.

- Kim Seon-ho as Cha Jae-rim

Grade 9 civil servant who has the ability to see ghosts.

=== Supporting ===
- Ryu Kyung-soo as No Ho-yeol
- Jang Young-nam
- Choi Gwang-il

=== Special appearance ===
- Ahn Eun-jin as Gu Seung-hee

Gu Young-jin's daughter.

== Production ==
=== Development ===
The series was developed under the working title May the Congressman Protect You (의원님이 보우하사; Uiwonnimi bouhasa). The project was co-produced by Zip Cinema and Studio Dragon, with Park Shin-woo serving as director. Garage Lab served as unit shoot team.

Screenwriter Kwon Jong-gwan adapted the script from Kim Hyun-bin's Kakao web novel of the same name, which was serialized on Kakao Page between 2021 and April 2024. The main setting of the original work is 1998, and the drama follows this timeline as well.

In April 2026, tvN was confirmed as the broadcasting network. During the same month, the production began accepting submissions for product placement.

=== Casting ===
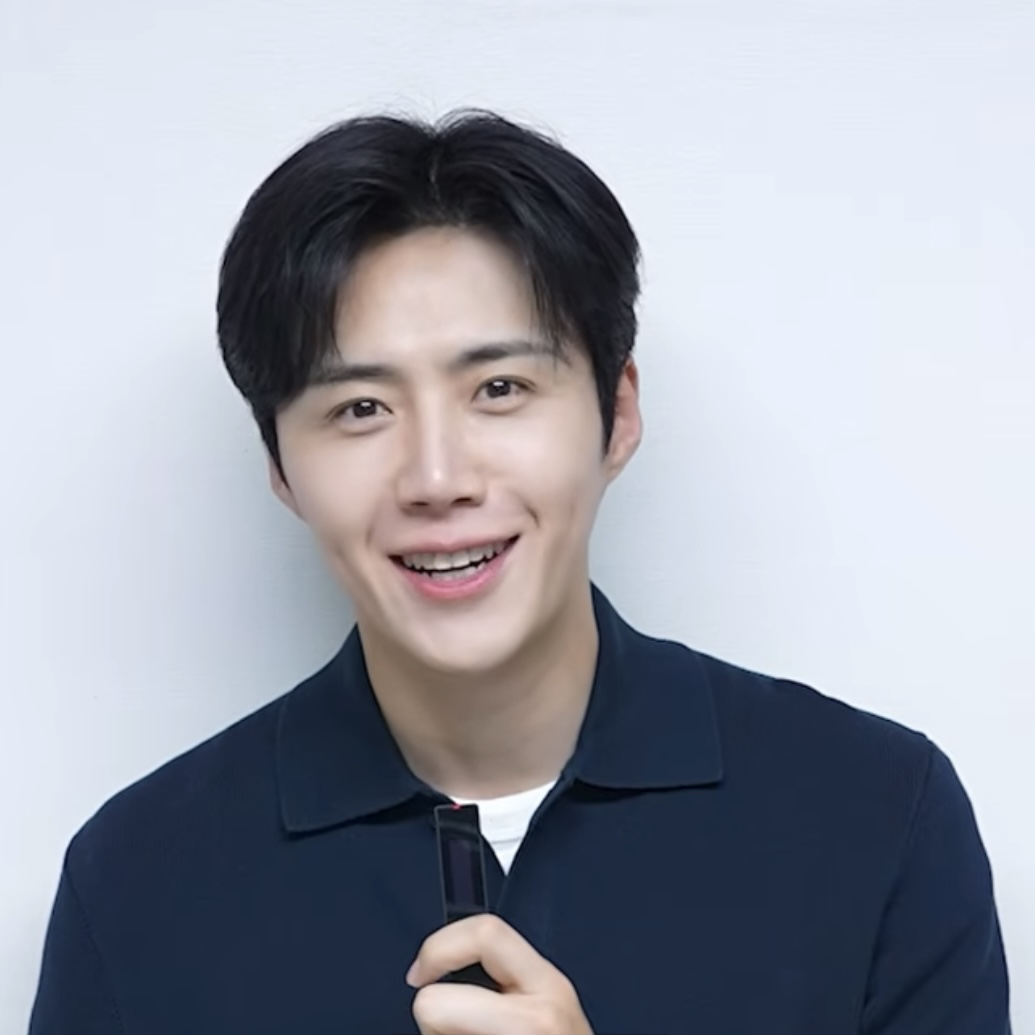
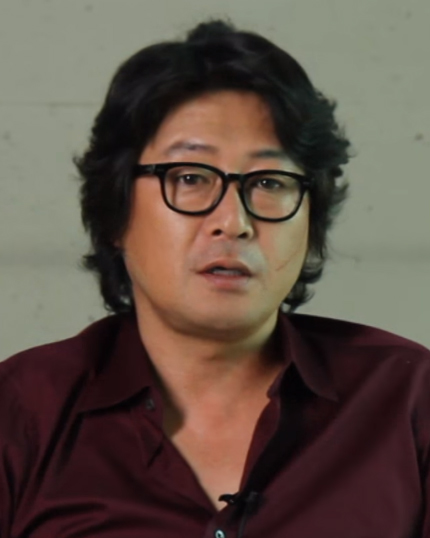
Kim Seon-ho (L) and Kim Yoon-seok (R)

The casting process began in 2025, with media outlets reporting on October 22 that Kim Yoon-seok and Kim Seon-ho were in talks for the lead roles of Gu Young-jin and Cha Jae-rim, respectively. The ensemble expanded on March 19, 2026, with the addition of Ryu Kyung-soo, who portrays a pivotal figure linked to Gu. Shortly thereafter, reports on March 30 confirmed a special appearance by Ahn Eun-jin as Gu's daughter, Gu Seung-hee. The principal cast was finalized by April 3, 2026, following an exclusive report noting that the confirmed actors had attended the initial production meeting. Official casting confirmation was reported on May 14, 2026.

=== Filming ===
Principal photography started in second week of April 2026.

== Release ==
The series is planned for release in the first quarter of 2027 on tvN.

== Accolades ==
Awards and nominations received by the series
Award ceremony	Year	Category	Recipient(s)	Result	Ref.
The 1st DFX Pitch	2026	Excellence Award	My Ghostly Running Mate	Won	
