= S Diary =

- Poster for S Diary
- Hangul: 에스 다이어리
- RR: Eseu daieori
- MR: Esŭ taiŏri
- Directed by: Kwon Jong-gwan
- Written by: Park Seong-gyeong; Kwon Jong-gwan
- Produced by: Jeong Hoon-tak
- Starring: Kim Sun-a; Kim Soo-ro; Lee Hyun-woo; Gong Yoo
- Cinematography: Kim Hoon-kwang; Im Chan
- Edited by: Moon In-dae
- Music by: Choi Wan-hee
- Production company: iFilm
- Distributed by: CJ Entertainment
- Release date: October 22, 2004
- Running time: 104 minutes
- Country: South Korea
- Language: Korean
- Box office: US$6.2 million

S Diary (Korean: 에스 다이어리) is a 2004 South Korean romantic comedy film about a woman who decides to interrogate her past lovers about why their relationships failed - then hatches a plot to take revenge on them.

On a dreary day, Jin-hee (Kim Sun-a) gets dumped by her boyfriend (Jang Hyuk) with the final note that he was only interested in having sex with her but not in a lasting relationship. This triggers her curiosity about whether her past three lovers were also only after her sexual favors. She checks back on her previous boyfriends - Ku-hyeon (Lee Hyun-woo), an advocate of strong religious beliefs, macho college lover Jeong-seok (Kim Soo-ro) and inexperienced Yoo-in (Gong Yoo) who makes a living as wandering artist. Will Jin-hee's emotional journey be rewarded with sincere answers from her old admirers?
