= Gyeonggi Arts High School =

Coordinates: 37.5059°N 126.7611°E

- 경기예술고등학교

Location
- 37 Seokcheon-ro 209; Gyeonggi-do; Bucheon; South Korea

Information
- Other name: 경예
- Type: Public High School
- Motto: 아름다움을 지향하는 창조하는 삶 (Creative Lives, Towards the Beauty)
- Established: 2002
- Authority: Gyeonggi Provincial Office of Education
- Principal: Park Kyung Hee
- Teaching staff: 68 (2020)
- Enrollment: 709 (2020)
- School fees: 4,376,000 KRW (2018)

Gyeonggi Arts High School (Korean: 경기예술고등학교), also known by the abbreviation Gyeonggi Yego (Korean: 경기예고) is a public high school located in Bucheon, South Korea. It is the only publicly-funded high school among art high schools located in Gyeonggi-do and has a dormitory that can accommodate over 200 people.

== Academics ==
It provides curriculum for a total of 4 arts fields, and the number of recruitment varies depending on the department. The music department is divided into detailed majors according to the musical instrument, and the art department can choose one of four major majors during the semester: Western Painting, Korean Painting, Sculpture, and Design. The Department of Theatre and Film, from 2009, is subdivided into acting majors and film majors. The department of Animation and Cartoon has several preparatory classes for students majoring in animation, as well as for those who aim to study abroad in Japan and France.

The school annually hold a musical event (Co-created by the entire students) and a graduation exhibition (Department of Visual Arts). In 2020, the school announced its first ‘online performance’ due to the COVID-19 pandemic. The orchestra regularly perform throughout the academic year.

Majority of recent graduates are continuing their study in Korean or overseas universities, including SNU, Hongik University, and Kyung Hee University.

=== Organisation ===
- Department of Animation & Cartoon
- Department of Classical Music, consists of Gyeonggi Arts High School Orchestra & Choir
- Department of Film & Theatre
- Department of Visual Arts

=== Academic affiliation ===
In February 2017, the school signed a MOU with Lam Tai Fai College in Hong Kong, and have agreed to offer exchange programmes for students and staff to increase knowledge and cultural appreciation.

== Gyeonggi Art Hall ==
Gyeonggi Art Hall is home for the school's orchestra & choir, and the department of theatre. The building has 4 floors and consists of 2 training rooms and a concert hall with 572 seats in total.

== In media ==
In 2015, a South Korean reality show Welcome Back to School aired several episodes filmed in Gyeonggi Arts High School. The episodes features celebrities such as Lee Tae-min of Shinee and Seulgi of Red Velvet. One of the cast members, Jo Young-nam, donated 5 Million South Korean won, to establish a scholarship fund for the students.

== Notable alumni ==
- Kim Seol-hyun
- Lee Soo-kyung
