= Hyundai Chungun High School =

School in Ulsan, South Korea

- 현대청운고등학교

Location
- Ulsan; South Korea
- Coordinates: 35.53660°N 129.42827°E

Information
- Type: Private, Boarding
- Established: 1981
- Founder: Chung Ju-yung
- Principal: Hyun Yung-gil
- Faculty: 61
- Enrollment: 530
- Flower: Rose
- Tree: Bamboo
- Website: www.hcu.hs.kr

- Hyundai Chungun High School
- Hangul: 현대청운고등학교
- Hanja: 現代靑雲高等學校
- RR: Hyeondae cheongun godeunghakgyo
- MR: Hyŏndae ch'ŏngun kodŭnghakkyo

Hyundai Chungun High School (Korean: 현대청운고등학교; HCU), is a private boarding high school located in Dong District, Ulsan, South Korea. It is one of the six independent private high schools (자율형 사립고) in South Korea that require an application of nationwide scale and admissions test to the applicant students. Since students who want to get in HCU usually get straight A when they are at middle school and take a test to get in HCU, they usually get rank 1 or rank 2 for their grades of CSAT (대학수학능력시험)College Scholastic Ability Test statistically. For example, there was a research for those who took CSAT in 2016 (2017학년도 대학수학능력시험), and HCU placed the 4th in nationwide for the average CSAT grade for Korean, Mathematics, and English. The percentage of rank 1 and rank 2 is 4%, 7% respectively. The aggregate percentile for rank 2 is 11%. Academic grading in South Korea 72.6% of students at HCU in 2016 got rank 1 or rank 2 for their CSAT grade.

== Specialized education ==
The school runs a so-called "Elite Leadership Education" program for gifted students, including Advanced Placement (AP) courses, as the school was registered as an official AP test center by the College Board in 2007. The school also operates the Academic Adviser Policy, an essay-writing program, and specializes in foreign languages, algebra, and natural sciences.

Established in 2008, the Hyundai Chungun Global Leader Program (HCGLP) is an international class for admission to top foreign universities, including English presentation courses to improve speaking and thinking ability in English. Sophomores can join the Global Leader Scholarship (GLS), a three-week program at Portland State University, Oregon, United States.

The school also runs classes and clubs for Korean traditional music and arts, including Samul Nori, Daegeum, and Gayageum.

== See also ==
- Education in South Korea
