= Awaken (TV series) =

2020 South Korean action mystery TV series

- Promotional poster
- Hangul: 낮과 밤
- Lit.: Day and Night
- RR: Natgwa bam
- MR: Natkwa pam
- Genre: Action; Thriller; Mystery
- Created by: Studio Dragon (planning)
- Written by: Shin Yoo-dam
- Directed by: Kim Jung-hyun
- Starring: Namkoong Min; Kim Seol-hyun; Lee Chung-ah
- Music by: Jeong Seung-hyun
- Country of origin: South Korea
- Original language: Korean
- No. of episodes: 16

Production
- Executive producer: Soo Jae-hyun
- Producers: Son Ki-won; Kim Nam-pyo; Kim Jae-hoon
- Camera setup: Single-camera
- Running time: 70 minutes
- Production companies: Kim Jong-hak Production; Story Vine Pictures

Original release
- Network: tvN
- Release: November 30, 2020 – January 19, 2021

Awaken (Korean: 낮과 밤; RR: Natgwa bam) is a 2020–2021 South Korean television series starring Namkoong Min, Kim Seol-hyun, Lee Chung-ah and Kim Chang-wan. The series, directed by Kim Jung-hyun and written by Shin Yoo-dam, revolves around two police officers as they dig up the secrets of mysterious events that occurred in a village 28 years ago.

It aired on tvN from November 30, 2020, to January 19, 2021, every Monday and Tuesday at 21:00 (KST).

== Synopsis ==
Do Jung-woo is the leader of a special task force in the Seoul Metropolitan Police Agency, who investigates a series of mysterious murders together with his team - a hot-headed officer named Gong Hye-won, and Jamie, a detective on loan from the FBI. They uncover clues that these crimes are somehow related to a tragic event that happened 28 years ago in a village called "White Night".

== Cast ==
=== Main ===
- Namkoong Min as Do Jung-woo
  - Oh Han-kyul as young Jung-woo

A special team leader of the Seoul Metropolitan Police Agency who is capable of writing a legend.

- Kim Seol-hyun as Gong Hye-won

An avid police officer who does not choose any means and methods, and a special team inspector at the Seoul Metropolitan Police Agency.

- Lee Chung-ah as Jamie Leighton
  - Kwon Ye-eun as young Jamie

Adopted in the United States as a child, she is an FBI-dispatched investigator who returns to Korea as an FBI Behavior Analysis Team Leader.

- Yoon Sun-woo as Moon Jae-woong
  - Jang Sun-yool as young Jae-woong

A hacker from MODU with dissociative identity disorder. He has two personalities: a weak personality, and a psychopath.

=== Supporting ===
==== People around Do Jung-woo ====
- Woo Hyun as Jung Soon-gu

CEO of Soonjung LP. He is a widower who took care of Jung-woo and helped him to live under a different name.

- Jung Dae-ro as Baek Hyun-soo

==== People around Gong Hye-won ====
- Kim Chang-wan as Gong Il-do

Gong Hye-won's father who is the Director of Baekya Biotech Research Institute.

- Jo Kyung-sook as Gong Hye-won's mother

==== People around Moon Jae-woong ====
- Jang Hyuk-jin as Jang Yong-shik, CEO of MODU

==== Broadcasting Station ====
- Yoon Kyung-ho as Lee Ji-wook
- Kim Ki-nam as Noh PD

==== Seoul Metropolitan Police Agency ====
- Kim Won-hae as Hwang Byeong-cheol

Deputy Chief of Seoul Metropolitan Police Agency.

- Baek Ji-won as Lee Taek-jo

Director of Information Management in the Seoul Metropolitan Police Agency.

- Choi Dae-chul as Yoon Seok-pil

A detective in the Seoul Metropolitan Police Agency Special Team who is a competent hacker.

- Lee Shin-young as Jang Ji-wan

A member of the Seoul Metropolitan Police Agency Special Team.

- Kang Rae-yeon as Min Yoo-ra

A pathologist from the National Forensic Service who performs autopsies.

==== Baekya Foundation ====
- Kim Tae-woo as Oh Jung-hwan

Chief secretary of the current president.

- Yoo Ha-joon as Kim Min-jae
- Choi Jin-ho as Son Min-ho

Former leader of White Night.

- Ahn Si-ha as Jo Hyun-hee

A scientist working for Baekya Foundation, former Head of Research of White Night.

- Lee Kan-hee

Baekya Foundation Director and wife of Lee Byeong-seon, Director of Hangang Hospital in Seoul, mother of Lee Tae-soo.

==== Others ====
- Jo Hye-won as Sun Geul-nyeo

Reporter Lee Ji-wook's source of information.

- Lee Ju-won as Son Min-ho's private lawyer

=== Special appearances ===
- Heo Jae-ho as truck driver (Ep. 1)
- Nam Woo-hyun as Oh Kyung-min (Ep. 1)
- Kwak Hee-joo as Kim Young-joon (Ep. 1)
- Kim Nam-jin as Go Ji-young's mother (Ep. 1)
- Lee Joon-sang as Baek Seung-jae (Ep. 1)
- Shin Jae-hwi as Lee Tae-soo; nightclub guy (Ep. 1 – 10)
- Joo Suk-tae as Choi Yong-suk (Ep. 1)
- Yang Dong-geun as prisoner (Ep. 1)
- Ha Min as Choi Yong-suk's wife (Ep. 2)
- Jaejae as Restaurant staff

== Production ==
In December 2019, 935 Entertainment, Namkoong Min's agency, reported that he had received an offer to play Do Jeong-woo, an investigator. At the same time, Han Ye-seul's agency, Partners Park, informed that she had been offered to appear in the series. Both confirmed their appearance in the series later on. In March 2020, Lee Chung-ah joined Namkoong Min in the cast. The script reading took place in April 2020. Yoon Kyung-ho joined the cast in June 2020. In August 2020, the filming of the drama was stopped due to the COVID-19 pandemic. In October 2020, Baek Ji-won and Lee Shin-young were confirmed to appear in the series, as the script reading was continued from where it was left in August. The first stills from the production were released on November 3, 2020.

== Original soundtrack ==
Soundtrack album by Various artists
- Released: 2020; 2021
- Genre: Soundtrack
- Languages: Korean; English
- Labels: Genie Music; Stone Music Entertainment

=== Part 1 ===
Released on December 8, 2020
| No. | Title | Music | Artist | Length |
|---|---|---|---|---|
| 1. | "Gray Zone" | DR; ZEZE | Idiotape | 3:01 |

=== Part 2 ===
Released on December 29, 2020
| No. | Title | Artist | Length |
|---|---|---|---|
| 1. | "Set Me Free - Day Version" | Jemma | 3:37 |
| 2. | "Set Me Free - Night Version" | Ha Dong Qn | 3:31 |
| Total length: | | | 7:08 |

=== Part 3 ===
Released on January 5, 2021
| No. | Title | Lyrics | Artist | Length |
|---|---|---|---|---|
| 1. | "Reverse" | Kim Ho-kyung | Mook | 7:24 |
| 2. | "Reverse" (Inst.) | | Mook | 7:24 |
| Total length: | | | | 14:48 |

Disc 2:
| No. | Title | Artist | Length |
|---|---|---|---|
| 1. | "Daybreak" | Roh Hyoung-woo | 10:36 |
| 2. | "A place unknown" | Yang Sung-woo | 3:04 |
| 3. | "That night" | Roh Hyoung-woo | 6:12 |
| 4. | "Shadow" | Shim Hyung-bo | 3:10 |
| 5. | "Pale" | Yang Sung-woo | 5:14 |
| 6. | "Investigation" | Roh Hyoung-woo | 6:00 |
| 7. | "Disappearing" | Kim Ji-min | 2:32 |
| 8. | "Run away from the truth" | Kim Ji-min | 4:25 |
| 9. | "For what" | You Jung-ho | 3:35 |
| 10. | "Disclosure" | Roh Hyoung-woo | 9:50 |
| 11. | "Crime Scene" | Oh Hee-joon | 3:04 |
| 12. | "Scene of the Crime" | Yang Sung-woo | 3:08 |
| 13. | "Truck chase" | Shim Hyung-bo | 3:08 |
| 14. | "Fallen" | Shim Hyung-bo | 2:38 |
| 15. | "Walking" | You Jung-ho | 2:49 |
| 16. | "Dark Fate" | Shim Hyung-bo | 3:08 |
| 17. | "The Truth" | Oh Hee-joon | 4:02 |
| Total length: | | | 76:35 |

== Viewership ==
Awaken : South Korea viewers per episode (thousands)

| Season | Episode number | | | | | | | | | | | | | | | | Average |
| Season | 1 | 2 | 3 | 4 | 5 | 6 | 7 | 8 | 9 | 10 | 11 | 12 | 13 | 14 | 15 | 16 | Average |
|---|---|---|---|---|---|---|---|---|---|---|---|---|---|---|---|---|---|
| 1 | 1119 | 973 | 977 | 1067 | 948 | 1016 | 796 | 1016 | 904 | 963 | 1203 | 1099 | 1174 | 1222 | 1236 | 1353 | 1066 |

Source: Audience measurement performed nationwide by Nielsen Korea.

Average TV viewership ratings
| Ep. | Original broadcast date | Average audience share (Nielsen Korea) | |
| Ep. | Original broadcast date | Nationwide | Seoul |
|---|---|---|---|
| 1 | November 30, 2020 | 4.704% (1st) | 5.422% (1st) |
| 2 | December 1, 2020 | 4.475% (1st) | 4.971% (1st) |
| 3 | December 7, 2020 | 4.012% (1st) | 4.485% (1st) |
| 4 | December 8, 2020 | 4.218% (1st) | 4.847% (1st) |
| 5 | December 14, 2020 | 3.921% (1st) | 4.568% (1st) |
| 6 | December 15, 2020 | 4.384% (1st) | 5.089% (1st) |
| 7 | December 21, 2020 | 3.451% (1st) | 3.829% (1st) |
| 8 | December 22, 2020 | 4.103% (1st) | 4.589% (1st) |
| 9 | December 28, 2020 | 4.111% (1st) | 4.462% (1st) |
| 10 | December 29, 2020 | 4.391% (1st) | 5.043% (1st) |
| 11 | January 4, 2021 | 4.790% (1st) | 5.474% (1st) |
| 12 | January 5, 2021 | 4.623% (1st) | 5.360% (1st) |
| 13 | January 11, 2021 | 4.795% (1st) | 5.002% (1st) |
| 14 | January 12, 2021 | 5.036% (1st) | 5.647% (1st) |
| 15 | January 18, 2021 | 5.397% (1st) | 6.067% (1st) |
| 16 | January 19, 2021 | 6.214% (1st) | 6.764% (1st) |
| Average | | 4.539% | 5.101% |
In the table above, the blue numbers represent the lowest ratings and the red numbers represent the highest ratings.; This drama aired on a cable channel/pay TV which normally has a relatively smaller audience compared to free-to-air TV/public broadcasters (KBS, SBS, MBC and EBS).
