= Brave Family =

- Starring: Shim Hye-jin, Lee Moon-sik, Park Myeong-su, Choi Jung-won, Kang Min-hyuk, Kim Seol-hyun
- Country of origin: South Korea
- Original language: Korean
- No. of seasons: 1
- No. of episodes: 10

Production
- Production company: KBS

Original release
- Network: KBS2
- Release: 23 January – 3 April 2015

Brave Family (Korean: 용감한 가족), is a South Korean reality-variety show that aired on KBS2 from 23 January 2015 to 3 April 2015 and aired a total of 10 episodes.

The concept of this program will follow celebrities becoming virtual family members, going overseas to live and adapting to their lifestyles.

== Cast ==
- Lee Moon-sik Role: Father
- Shim Hye-jin Role: Mother
- Kang Min-hyuk Role: Son
- Choi Jung-won Role: Eldest Daughter (EP 1 – 5)
- Kim Seol-hyun Role: Youngest Daughter (Maknae)
- Park Myeong-su Role: Uncle
- Park Joo-mi Role: Uncle's Wife (EP 6 – 10)

== History ==
Brave Family replaced I Am a Man, a talk show taken off air after its final episode on 19 December 2014.

This show took place in Cambodia and Laos, filming of first part took place on 2 January 2015 to 8 January 2015 at Cambodia and expected to aired on mid-January 2015.

== List of Brave Family episode ==
Episodes	Broadcast Date	Theme	Rating
1	23 January	The First Settlement!Tonlé Sap	6.2%
2	30 January	How to live on the waterjet	4.9%
3	6 February	But we're Family	4.6%
4	13 February	Diving into Tonle Sap	6.1%
5	27 February	Meaning of Family, Secret to Happiness	4.3%
6	6 March	Khok Saat Salt Village	4.2%
7	13 March	Salty Romance	4.3%
8	20 March	In the Name of Family	4.8%
9	27 March	Men and Women	4.6%
10	3 April	Laos' Secret to Happiness	5.3%

(Ratings: Nielsen Korea provided)
