= Hijack 1971 =

2024 South Korean film by Kim Seong-han

- Theatrical release poster
- Hangul: 하이재킹
- Lit.: Hijacking
- RR: Haijaeking
- MR: Haijaek'ing
- Directed by: Kim Seong-han
- Written by: Kim Kyung-chan
- Starring: Ha Jung-woo; Yeo Jin-goo; Sung Dong-il; Chae Soo-bin
- Cinematography: Lee Hyung-deok
- Edited by: Kim Sang-bum
- Music by: Kim Tae-seong
- Production companies: Kidari Studio; Perfect Storm Film; Channel Plus
- Distributed by: Sony Pictures Entertainment Korea
- Release date: 21 June 2024
- Running time: 100 minutes
- Country: South Korea
- Language: Korean
- Box office: US$14.6 million

Hijack 1971 (Korean: 하이재킹; lit. 'Hijacking') is a 2024 South Korean action thriller film written by Kim Kyeong-chan and directed by Kim Seong-han, starring Ha Jung-woo, Yeo Jin-goo, Sung Dong-il and Chae Soo-bin. The film is based on the hijack attempt of a Korean Air F27 airliner in 1971. It was released theatrically on June 21, 2024.

== Plot ==
In December 1969, South Korean fighter pilot Tae-in intercepts an airliner hijacked by a North Korean agent. He refuses to fire on the plane before it reaches North Korean airspace, fearing for the passengers' safety and recognizing the pilot to be his friend and former mentor Min-soo. The plane reaches North Korea and Tae-in is kicked out of the air force for disobeying orders. Later, 39 of the plane's 46 passengers are repatriated back to South Korea but the other seven passengers and the plane's four crew, including Min-soo, end up remaining in North Korea indefinitely. Tae-in later finds a job as a pilot with Korean Air.

In January 1971, Tae-in and captain Gyu-Sik command a Fokker F27 flight from Sokcho Airport to Gimpo International Airport in Seoul. After take off, passenger Yong-dae detonates two improvised explosive devices, one of which blows a hole in the cabin floor, injuring several passengers and a sky marshal, and the other destroys the lock on the cockpit door, partially blinding Gyu-Sik and forcing Tae-in to take over. Yong-dae takes control of the cockpit and demands the pilots take the plane to North Korea, threatening them with a knife and another improvised explosive device.

During turbulence, several passengers attempt to attack Yong-dae but he manages to get hold of the air marshal's gun. Tae-in tries to land at a remote airstrip but Yong-dae threatens to blow up the plane; in retaliation Yong-dae shoots Tae-in in the leg. Yong-dae explains that he and his family were ostracized for having a North Korean brother and believes that he would be treated better there.

The plane is intercepted by South Korean fighter jets, led by Tae-in's former comrade Dong-cheol, who warns Tae-in that North Korean fighters are also approaching to intercept. Tae-in outmanoeuvres the fighters' attempts to shoot his engines and Yong-dae loses his gun in the chaos. Faced with worsening odds, Tae-in and Gyu-Sik decide to crash land the plane on a beach; Yong-dae attempts to wrest control back but Tae-in fights him before Yong-dae is shot and killed by the sky marshal. When Yong-dae's remaining explosive device detonates after he dies, Tae-in uses his body to shield the passengers from the blast, and is mortally wounded. Gyu-Sik successfully lands the plane on the beach with the help from Ok-soon, a flight attendant and the dying Tae-in. All the passengers are evacuated safely as Tae-in dies of his wounds while still sitting in the cockpit.

== Cast ==
- Ha Jung-woo as Tae-in, the first officer of a civilian airliner. He is based on Park Wan-gyu, who was the first officer at the time of the actual incident.
- Yeo Jin-goo as Yong-dae, a civilian airliner hijacker. He is based on Kim Sang-tae, the terrorist who caused the actual incident.
- Sung Dong-il as Gyu-sik, captain of a civilian airliner. He is based on Lee Kang-heun, the captain at the time of the actual incident.
- Chae Soo-bin as Lee Ok-soon, a flight attendant on a civilian airliner
- Kim Dong-wook as Choi Dong-cheol, an Air Force F-5 fighter pilot and Tae-in's junior
- Choi Kwang-il as Seo Min-soo, the co-pilot of the YS-11 and Tae-in's senior during his time in the Air Force
- Kim Jong-soo as Jang Young-hwan, Air Force Flight Commander stationed at Gangneung Air Base
- Moon Yoo-kang as Chang-bae, a Korean Air flight security officer
- Jeong Ye-jin as Lee Soo-hee, an English teacher on board the airplane who takes care of Han-bong
- Moon Woo-jin as Lee Han-bong, a student from Woochang Middle School who boarded the plane
- Im Se-mi as Moon-young, Tae-in's wife
- Kim Sun-young as Young-sook, Tae-in's senior from the Air Force and Min-soo's wife who was kidnapped
- Kim Chul-yoon as Nam-il, a husband who boarded the plane to go on a honeymoon
- Park Ji-hwan as an airport agent
- Park Soo-young as Police Officer
