= Orange Marmalade (TV series) =

South Korean television series

- Promotional poster
- Genre: Romance; Fantasy; Teen
- Based on: Orange Marmalade by Seok Woo
- Written by: Moon So-san
- Directed by: Lee Hyung-min; Choi Sung-bum
- Starring: Yeo Jin-goo; Kim Seol-hyun; Lee Jong-hyun; Gil Eun-hye
- Opening theme: "The Scent"
- Ending theme: "It's Fine" / "Magic" (Inst.)
- Composer: Erica YK Jung (Chung Yea-kyung)
- Country of origin: South Korea
- Original language: Korean
- No. of episodes: 12

Production
- Executive producers: Lee Sang-hoon; Jang Sung-joo
- Producers: Kim Jung-hwan; Kim Hyung-joon; Kim Kyung-won
- Cinematography: Uhm Joon-sung
- Running time: 50 minutes
- Production companies: A Song For You Culture Industry Co., Ltd. KBS N Zen Production

Original release
- Network: Korean Broadcasting System
- Release: May 15 – July 24, 2015

Orange Marmalade (Korean: 오렌지 마말레이드; RR: Orenji mamalleideu) is a 2015 South Korean television series based on the webtoon of the same name which was serialized on Naver WEBTOON from 2011 to 2013. Starring Yeo Jin-goo, Kim Seol-hyun, Lee Jong-hyun and Gil Eun-hye, it aired on KBS2 from May 15 to July 24, 2015 on Fridays at 22:35 for 12 episodes.

== Plot ==
Set in a fantasy world where humans and vampires coexist, the latter have evolved and no longer rely on human blood as food. Still, they are feared and discriminated against by society, causing many of them to hide their true nature and live as "normal" citizens, or else become outcasts.

Baek Ma-ri (Kim Seol-hyun) is a socially withdrawn teenage girl hiding her vampire identity. Driven away from several neighborhoods, she is eager to settle down in her new city and live quietly. But things change when she accidentally kisses the neck of the most popular boy at her high school, Jung Jae-min (Yeo Jin-goo), and falls in love with him.

== Cast ==
=== Main characters ===
- Yeo Jin-goo as Jung Jae-min

- Song Ui-joon as young Jae-min

He is the most popular boy in school. His mother married a vampire when he was in middle school, causing him to quit music. He has hated vampires ever since. He falls for Baek Ma-ri when she transfers to his school, not knowing that she is a vampire.

- Kim Seol-hyun as Baek Ma-ri

As a child she was shunned and became an outcast. Determined to graduate from high school, she transfers to a new school and hides her vampire identity. She eventually falls for Jung Jae-min, but is caught in a love triangle with her childhood friend and fellow vampire, Han Si-hoo. She dreams of becoming a musician.

- Lee Jong-hyun as Han Si-hoo
  - Kang Han-byeol as young Si-hoo

He is a vampire and Baek Ma-ri's childhood friend. His uncle had married Jung Jae-min's mother when he was in middle school. He has feelings for Ma-ri, and becomes involved in a love triangle with her and Jae-min.

- Gil Eun-hye as Jo Ah-ra

She is the most popular girl in school. Used to getting her way, she doesn't like the fact that Baek Ma-ri has captured Jung Jae-min's attention. She resorts to bullying Ma-ri and hiding that fact behind her sweet demeanor.

=== Supporting characters ===
- Ahn Gil-kang as Baek Seung-hoon
- Yoon Ye-hee as Song Sun-hwa
- Song Jong-ho as Han Yoon-jae
- Lee Il-hwa as Kang Min-ha
- Jo Yi-hyun as Baek Joseph
- Jo Min-ki as Jung Byung-kwon
- Jung Hae-kyun as Jo Joon-gu
- Oh Kyung-min as Choi Soo-ri
- Park Gun-woo as Hwang Beom-sung
- Lee Da-heen as Ae-kyung
- Kim Ji-ah as Yoon Min-sun
- Lee Yoo as Ah-ra and Ae-kyung's friend
- Joo Ho as Biology teacher

== Ratings ==
Episode #	Original airdate	Average TNmS ratings	Average AGB Nielsen ratings
Season One (modern day)
1	May 15, 2015	4.8%	4.2%
2	May 15, 2015	3.7%	3.3%
3	May 22, 2015	4.9%	4.1%
4	May 29, 2015	3.6%	3.3%
Season Two (Joseon dynasty)
5	June 5, 2015	4.4%	3.9%
6	June 12, 2015	4.2%	4.9%
7	June 19, 2015	3.9%	3.4%
8	June 26, 2015	2.8%	2.5%
9	July 3, 2015	3.2%	2.8%
Season Three (modern day)
10	July 10, 2015	2.6%	3.1%
11	July 17, 2015	2.5%	2.6%
12	July 24, 2015	2.3%	2.4%
Average		3.5%	3.4%

Key: Blue-lowest rated episode; Red-highest rated episode.

The series also aired on KBS World two weeks after its initial broadcast, with subtitles.

== Awards and nominations ==
Year	Award	Category	Recipient	Result
2015	8th Korea Drama Awards	Best New Actress	Kim Seol-hyun	Nominated
2015	4th APAN Star Awards	Best New Actress	Kim Seol-hyun	Nominated
2015	KBS Drama Awards	Best New Actor	Yeo Jin-goo	Won
2015	KBS Drama Awards	Best New Actress	Kim Seol-hyun	Nominated
2015	KBS Drama Awards	Popularity Award, Actor	Yeo Jin-goo	Nominated
2015	KBS Drama Awards	Popularity Award, Actress	Kim Seol-hyun	Won
2015	KBS Drama Awards	Best Couple Award	Yeo Jin-goo and Kim Seol-hyun	Nominated

== See also ==
- List of vampire television series
