= The Crowned Clown =

2019 South Korean television series

- Promotional poster
- Hangul: 왕이 된 남자
- Hanja: 王이 된 男子
- Lit.: The Man Who Became King
- RR: Wangi doen namja
- MR: Wangi toen namja
- Genre: Historical; Romance; Melodrama
- Developed by: Studio Dragon
- Written by: Kim Seon-deok; Shin Ha-eun
- Directed by: Kim Hee-won
- Starring: Yeo Jin-goo; Lee Se-young; Kim Sang-kyung
- Country of origin: South Korea
- Original language: Korean
- No. of episodes: 16

Production
- Executive producer: Kim Kyu-tae
- Camera setup: Single-camera
- Production company: GTist

Original release
- Network: tvN
- Release: January 7 – March 4, 2019

Related
- Masquerade (film)

The Crowned Clown (Korean: 왕이 된 남자) is a 2019 South Korean television series starring Yeo Jin-goo, Lee Se-young, and Kim Sang-kyung. A remake of the 2012 film Masquerade, the series centers on the tale of a Joseon King and his doppelganger, a clown whom he puts on the throne to escape the intense power struggles afflicting the royal court. It aired from January 7 to March 4, 2019, on tvN.

== Synopsis ==
The story takes place in mid-Joseon period, when upheavals and power struggles surrounding the throne had reached extremely devastating levels. In order to escape those who plan to assassinate him, the King puts a clown, who looks exactly like him, on the throne. As the clown settles into his role, the palace is upended as the King's enemies are confounded by the imposter's creativity and his ever-expanding circle of allies, who are glad to see the "King" finally become the ruler they have always wanted.

== Cast ==
=== Main ===
- Yeo Jin-goo as Ha-seon, the clown / Yi Heon, the King
- Lee Se-young as Yoo So-woon, the Queen
- Kim Sang-kyung as Yi Kyu (Haksan), the Chief Royal Secretary

=== Supporting ===
==== People around Ha-seon ====
- Jang Gwang as Eunuch Jo
- Yoon Jong-suk as Jang Moo-young, a military officer
- Shin Soo-yeon as Dal-rae, Ha-seon's sister and fellow performer
- Yoon Kyung-ho as Kap-soo, Ha-seon and Dal-rae's elder performer

==== People around So-woon ====
- Oh Ha-nee as Ae-young, a maid
- Kim Soo-jin as Court Lady Park

==== People around Yi Heon ====
- Kwon Hae-hyo as Shin Chi-soo, the Left State Councillor
- Jang Young-nam as the Queen Dowager
- Lee Moo-saeng as Prince Jinpyung
- Min Ji-ah as Court Lady Kim
- Choi Kyu-jin as Shin Yi-kyeom, Shin Chi-soo's son and a member of the Office of Censors
- Seo Yoon-ah as Seon Hwa-dang, Shin Chi-soo's niece and Yi Heon's favourite concubine
- Lee Mi-eun as Court Lady Jang
- Park Si-eun as Choi Kye-hwan, a 15-year-old kitchen maid

==== People around Yi Kyu ====
- Jung Hye-young as Woon-sim, a courtesan
- Lee Yoon-gun as Yoo Ho-joon, So-woon's father
- Lee Kyu-han as Joo Ho-geol
- Choi Moo-in as Lee Han-jong
- Lee Chang-jik as Seo Jang-won
- Song Duk-ho as Woo Jeong-rim
- Jang Sung-won as Jung Saeng, a Buddhist monk

=== Special appearances ===
- Jang Hyuk as King Seonjo, Yi Heon's father (Episode 1)
- Yoon Park as Lord Kiseong (Episode 16)

== Production ==
The first script reading took place on October 8, 2018, in Sangam-dong, Seoul, South Korea.

== Original soundtrack ==
The Crowned Clown Original Soundtrack

Soundtrack album by Various artists
- Released: 2019
- Genre: Soundtrack
- Languages: Korean; English
- Labels: MUSIC&NEW, Music Buddy

=== Part 1 ===
Released on January 14, 2019
No.	Title	Lyrics	Music	Artist	Length
1.	"If I See You Again" (다시 볼 수 있다면)	Jung Young-ho	Jung Young-ho	Oh Yeon-joon	4:00
2.	"If I Can See You Again" (Inst.)		Jung Young-ho		4:00
Total length:					8:00

=== Part 2 ===
Released on January 21, 2019
No.	Title	Lyrics	Music	Artist	Length
1.	"That Day, We." (그날, 우리)	JPG	JPG	Baekho (NU'EST)	4:12
2.	"That Day, We." (Inst.)		JPG		4:12
3.	"Serenade I (Hasun's Theme)"				2:47
4.	"Serenade II (Soun's Theme)"				2:21
Total length:					13:32

=== Part 3 ===
Released on January 28, 2019
No.	Title	Lyrics	Music	Artist	Length
1.	"Tell Me" (말해줘요)	Kim Beom-joo, Kim Shi-hyuk, Park Se-joon	Kim Beom-joo, Kim Shi-hyuk, Park Se-joon	Eunha (GFriend)	4:32
2.	"Tell Me" (Inst.)		Kim Beom-joo, Kim Shi-hyuk, Park Se-joon		4:32
Total length:					9:04

=== Part 4 ===
Released on February 4, 2019
No.	Title	Lyrics	Music	Artist	Length
1.	"Five Seasons" (오계절)	VIP	VIP	HAEUN	4:16
2.	"Five Seasons (Soft Ver.)" (오계절 (Soft Ver.))	VIP	VIP	HAEUN	4:16
3.	"Five Seasons" (Inst.)		VIP		4:16
Total length:					12:48

=== Part 5 ===
Released on February 11, 2019
No.	Title	Lyrics	Music	Artist	Length
1.	"Always"	TAIBIAN	TAIBIAN, Bark	Seulgi (Red Velvet)	4:35
2.	"Always" (Inst.)		TAIBIAN, Bark		4:35
Total length:					9:10

=== Part 6 ===
Released on February 19, 2019
No.	Title	Lyrics	Music	Artist	Length
1.	"If I Could Be By Your Side" (니 곁이라면)	Shim Hyun-bo	Sung Si-kyung	Sung Si-kyung	4:30
2.	"If I Could Be By Your Side" (Inst.)		Sung Si-kyung		4:30
Total length:					9:00

=== Part 7 ===
Released on February 25, 2019
No.	Title	Lyrics	Music	Artist	Length
1.	"Light Saver" (위화(衛華))	Ahn Ye-eun	Ahn Ye-eun	Ahn Ye-eun	3:37
2.	"Light Saver" (Inst.)		Ahn Ye-eun		3:37
Total length:					7:14

=== Part 8 ===
Released on February 26, 2019
No.	Title	Lyrics	Music	Artist	Length
1.	"A Long Way From Now" (아주 먼 훗날)	SE O, Park Se-joon	SE O, Park Se-joon	SE O	3:12
2.	"A Long Way From Now" (Inst.)		SE O, Park Se-joon		3:12
Total length:					6:24

Disc 2:
No.	Title	Artist	Length
1.	"Man who became king" (Opening Title)	Various Artists	2:27
2.	"A Failure"	Various Artists	2:27
3.	"Before fall down"	Various Artists	2:57
4.	"Back to the dust"	Various Artists	4:15
5.	"Burning Sequence"	Various Artists	3:02
6.	"Change the world"	Various Artists	2:29
7.	"Communist Ideology"	Various Artists	2:07
8.	"Dark one"	Various Artists	2:21
9.	"End of Winter"	Various Artists	1:43
10.	"Evil Flower"	Various Artists	2:34
11.	"Firefly"	Various Artists	2:47
12.	"Frozen Tears"	Various Artists	2:25
13.	"Face off"	Various Artists	3:30
14.	"Green Teacher"	Various Artists	2:08
15.	"Gretchen"	Various Artists	3:30
16.	"Lose King's face"	Various Artists	1:49
17.	"My Reflection in the lake"	Various Artists	2:44
18.	"Red Eagle"	Various Artists	2:18
19.	"Ridicilous Trace"	Various Artists	2:20
20.	"Rewrite"	Various Artists	2:55
21.	"Search Block"	Various Artists	3:26
22.	"Silent Eyes"	Various Artists	2:46
23.	"Snow field"	Various Artists	2:33
24.	"Sleepy"	Various Artists	2:10
25.	"Song for a love"	Various Artists	2:51
26.	"Stalking"	Various Artists	2:55
27.	"Storm Beat"	Various Artists	1:55
28.	"The Coup"	Various Artists	2:51
29.	"The End of the road"	Various Artists	4:00
30.	"The Night before farewell"	Various Artists	3:15
31.	"The way of truth"	Various Artists	5:47
32.	"The Letter"	Various Artists	2:37
33.	"Time of Blood"	Various Artists	2:43
34.	"To be seen or not"	Various Artists	3:12
35.	"Turning point"	Various Artists	3:09
36.	"Who is real?"	Various Artists	3:41
37.	"Serenade III"	Various Artists	2:46
38.	"Storm Beat" (Ending Title)	Various Artists	1:08

== Ratings ==
The Crowned Clown : South Korea viewers per episode (millions)

Season	Episode number																Average
Season	1	2	3	4	5	6	7	8	9	10	11	12	13	14	15	16	Average
1	1.364	1.499	1.849	2.055	1.829	1.651	1.845	2.064	1.575	1.871	1.966	1.868	2.189	1.926	2.114	2.447	1.882

Source: Audience measurement performed nationwide by Nielsen Media Research.

Average TV viewership ratings
Ep.	Original broadcast date	Average audience share (AGB Nielsen)	
Ep.	Original broadcast date	Nationwide	Seoul
1	January 7, 2019	5.709%	6.130%
2	January 8, 2019	6.559%	7.212%
3	January 14, 2019	8.022%	9.802%
4	January 15, 2019	8.933%	9.515%
5	January 21, 2019	8.053%	8.939%
6	January 22, 2019	7.597%	7.962%
7	January 28, 2019	8.375%	9.434%
8	January 29, 2019	9.455%	10.092%
9	February 4, 2019	6.576%	6.899%
10	February 11, 2019	8.240%	8.983%
11	February 12, 2019	9.316%	10.179%
12	February 18, 2019	8.695%	9.110%
13	February 19, 2019	10.002%	11.119%
14	February 25, 2019	8.698%	9.757%
15	February 26, 2019	9.472%	10.007%
16	March 4, 2019	10.851%	11.783%
Average		8.410%	9.183%
Special	January 1, 2019	1.696%	2.051%
Special	February 5, 2019	2.517%	2.767%
In the table above, the blue numbers represent the lowest ratings and the red numbers represent the highest ratings.; This drama aired on a cable channel/pay TV which normally has a relatively smaller audience compared to free-to-air TV/public broadcasters (KBS, SBS, MBC and EBS).; Due to the Lunar New Year holiday, episode 10 aired on February 11, 2019 instead of February 5.

== Awards and nominations ==
Year	Award	Category	Recipient	Result	Ref.
2019	55th Baeksang Arts Awards	Best Actor	Yeo Jin-goo	Nominated	
2019	55th Baeksang Arts Awards	Best Supporting Actor	Kim Sang-kyung	Nominated	
2019	12th Korea Drama Awards	Excellence Award, Actress	Lee Se-young	Won	
