= Shoot Me in the Heart =

- Theatrical poster
- Directed by: Mun Che-yong
- Written by: Mun Che-yong; You Sun-dong
- Based on: Shoot Me in the Heart by Jeong Yu-jeong
- Produced by: Ju Pil-ho; Bang Mi-jeong
- Starring: Lee Min-ki; Yeo Jin-goo
- Cinematography: Jo Yong-gyu
- Edited by: Kim Chang-ju; Park Gyeong-suk
- Music by: Kim Jun-seok
- Production companies: Isu C&E; Jupiter Film; 9ers Entertainment; Sidus Pictures
- Distributed by: Little Big Pictures
- Release date: January 28, 2015
- Running time: 101 minutes
- Country: South Korea
- Language: Korean
- Box office: US$2.5 million

Shoot Me in the Heart (Korean: 내 심장을 쏴라; RR: Nae simjangeul sswara), or Shoot My Heart, is a 2015 South Korean drama film directed by Mun Che-yong, and starring Lee Min-ki and Yeo Jin-goo. It is based on the bestselling novel of the same name by Jeong Yu-jeong, which won the Segye Literature Award in 2009.

== Plot ==
Soo-myung and Seung-min, both 25 years old, meet for the first time at Soori Hope Hospital, a run-down psychiatric facility located on a mountain. Soo-myung has been institutionalized since he was nineteen after the trauma caused by his mother's suicide, and has a phobia of scissors. Seung-min is a sane and champion paraglider, but was forcibly committed by his greedy half-brother to get Seung-min's share of the family inheritance. Soo-myung is a model patient, peacefully and passively spending his days in the hospital despite its abusive nurses, unlike Seung-min, who is a walking time bomb. Soon, Soo-myung gets roped into Seung-min's reckless plan to break out of the hospital.

== Cast ==
- Lee Min-ki as Seung-min
- Yeo Jin-goo as Soo-myung
- Yu Oh-seong as Choi Ki-hoon
- Kim Jung-tae as Kim Yong
- Kim Gi-cheon as Man-sik
- Shin Goo as Ascetic Sibwoonsan
- Song Young-chang as Director of psychiatric hospital
- Park Choong-seon as Depressed cleaner
- Park Doo-shik as Jeom Bak-yi
- Han Hye-rin as Yoon Bo-ra
- Kim Jae-hwa as Princess Buckingham
- Choi Yoon-Bin as Patient 1
- Kim Seon-ha as Patient 2
- Lee Jun-hyeok as Street musician

== Production ==
Filming began on May 1, 2014, and wrapped three months later on July 27 in Jeonju.

== Awards and nominations ==
Year	Award	Category	Recipient	Result
2015	52nd Grand Bell Awards	Best New Actor	Yeo Jin-goo	Nominated
