= Warriors of the Dawn =

- Theatrical release poster
- Hangul: 대립군
- Hanja: 代立軍
- RR: Daeripgun
- MR: Taeripkun
- Directed by: Jeong Yoon-cheol
- Written by: Shin Do-young; Jeong Yoon-cheol
- Produced by: Won Dong-yeon; Yoon Young-ha; Kim Ho-sung; Ju Bang-ok
- Starring: Lee Jung-jae; Yeo Jin-goo; Kim Mu-yeol; Park Won-sang; Bae Soo-bin; Esom
- Cinematography: Byun Bong-sun
- Music by: Lee Eun-joo; Mowg
- Production companies: REALies Pictures; 20th Century Fox Korea; Verdi Media; Blossom Pictures
- Distributed by: 20th Century Fox Korea
- Release date: May 31, 2017
- Running time: 130 minutes
- Country: South Korea
- Language: Korean
- Box office: US$5.5 million

Warriors of the Dawn (Korean: 대립군; lit. 'Proxy Soldiers') is a 2017 South Korean historical drama film by Jeong Yoon-cheol set during the 1592 Imjin War, starring Lee Jung-jae and Yeo Jin-goo. The story follows a group of mercenaries tasked with protecting the newly crowned prince Gwanghae during a long and treacherous journey vital to the country's future. The film was released on May 31, 2017.

== Plot ==
To avoid invading Japanese forces, King Seonjo escapes to the Ming Empire and abandons his people in the process. In his place, Prince Gwanghae (Yeo Jin-goo) leads the royal court and confronts the enemies with the help of proxy soldiers led by To-woo (Lee Jung-jae). Proxy soldiers consist of those who are paid to serve in the military on behalf of others.

== Cast ==
- Lee Jung-jae as To-woo
- Yeo Jin-goo as Prince Gwanghae
- Kim Mu-yeol as Gok-soo
- Park Won-sang as Jo-seung
- Bae Soo-bin as Yang-sa
- Esom as Duk-yi
- Kim Myung-gon as Jung Pan-seo
- Oh Kwang-rok as Pockmark
- Han Jae-yeong as Wang Chun
- Park Ji-hwan as Gorruta
- Park Hae-joon as Tarobe
- Park Ho-san as King Seonjo
- Cho Dong-in as Soi-dol

== Production ==
The filming began on September 5, 2016, and wrapped up on January 10, 2017. The original English title for the movie was The Proxy Soldiers before it was officially changed to Warriors of the Dawn.

== Awards and nominations ==
Awards	Category	Recipient	Result	Ref.
54th Baeksang Arts Awards	Best Supporting Actress	Esom	Nominated	
