= The Long Way Home (2015 film) =

- Theatrical poster
- Hangul: 서부전선
- Hanja: 西部戰線
- RR: Seobujeonseon
- MR: Sŏbujŏnsŏn
- Directed by: Cheon Sung-il
- Written by: Cheon Sung-il
- Produced by: Gang Min-gyu
- Starring: Sul Kyung-gu; Yeo Jin-goo
- Cinematography: Lee Jae-hyeok
- Edited by: Kim Chang-ju
- Music by: Choi Seung-hyun
- Production company: Harimao Pictures
- Distributed by: Lotte Entertainment; Taiwan Broadcasting System
- Release date: September 24, 2015
- Running time: 111 minutes
- Country: South Korea
- Budget: US$6.7 million
- Box office: US$4.2 million

The Long Way Home (Korean: 서부전선; RR: Seobujeonseon; lit. 'Western Front') is a 2015 period war comedy film written and directed by Cheon Sung-il, about the friendship between a South Korean and a North Korean soldier during the Korean War.

== Plot ==
Set during the Korean War and 3 days before a truce takes place. Nam-Bok (Sol Kyung-Gu) is a South Korean soldier. He was a simple farmer before his conscription into the military. Nam-Bok then receives order to deliver a top secret document at a set time and place, but an attack by the North Korean army causes Nam-Bok to lose the document.

Meanwhile, Young-Gwang (Yeo Jin-Goo) is a North Korean soldier. He is a part of a tank crew. While heading to the South, his team is bombed and he is the only one left. He is about to return home, but he happens to come across a top secret document.

The two men face off in the western front alone.

== Cast ==
- Sul Kyung-gu as Jang Nam-bok
- Yeo Jin-goo as Kim Young-kwang
- Lee Geung-young as Lieutenant Yoo
- Jung Sung-hwa as General Yeon
- Jung In-gi as Sergeant Kim
- Jo Hee-bong as Drunkard
- Kim Won-hae as Deputy Jeon
- Jung Suk-won as Senior lieutenant
- Kim Sun-young as Ajumma
- Noh Young-hak as Petty officer Choi
- Song Kyung-chul as Sang-joo
- Kim Tae-hoon as General Jo
- Ji Chang-wook as Conscription officer
- Yang Byung-yeol as Second lieutenant Ahn
