= Circle (TV series) =

2017 South Korean television series

- Promotional poster
- Hangul: 써클: 이어진 두 세계
- Lit.: Circle: Two Worlds Connected
- RR: Sseokeul: ieojin du segye
- MR: Ssŏk'ŭl: iŏjin tu segye
- Genre: Science fiction; Dystopian fiction; Mystery; Thriller
- Created by: Lee Myung-han
- Written by: Kim Jin-hee; Yoo Hye-mi; Ryu Moon-sang; Park Eun-mi
- Directed by: Min Jin-ki
- Creative directors: Jun Min-ho; Noh Jung-hoon; Park Hyung-won; Wi Sung-yun; Kim Geum-nan
- Starring: Yeo Jin-goo; Kim Kang-woo; Gong Seung-yeon; Lee Gi-kwang
- Theme music composer: 1601
- Ending theme: "Alive" by UJi feat. Andup
- Composer: Kim Soo-jin
- Country of origin: South Korea
- Original language: Korean
- No. of episodes: 12

Production
- Executive producer: Park Sung-jae
- Producers: Choi Jin-hee; Jang Jin-wook
- Cinematography: Choi Sung-tae; Park Sung-young
- Editors: Na Hee-soo; Jung Mi-sook
- Camera setup: Single-camera setup
- Running time: 60 minutes
- Production companies: tvN; Studio Dragon; KPJ Corporation

Original release
- Network: tvN
- Release: May 22 – June 27, 2017

Circle (Korean: 써클: 이어진 두 세계) is a 2017 South Korean science fiction television series starring Yeo Jin-goo, Kim Kang-woo, Gong Seung-yeon, and Lee Gi-kwang. The series features two parallel plots set in the years 2017 and 2037, both centered on twin brothers' struggle with the discovery and development of an advanced alien technology that could either be a boon or bane for the entire human race.

It aired on tvN for 12 episodes at 23:00 KST on Mondays and Tuesdays from May 22 to June 27, 2017.

== Synopsis ==
In the year 2007, before the main events of the drama, 11-year-old fraternal twin brothers Kim Woo-jin (Jung Ji-hoon) and Kim Bum-gyun (Kim Ye-joon), along with their neuroscientist father Dr. Kim Kyu-chul (Kim Joong-ki), witness the arrival of a female humanoid alien (Gong Seung-yeon). Out of pity and curiosity, the family brings the alien with them and adopts her as a member of the family. The twins become fond of her, especially Woo-jin who names her Byul. (Note: Hangul: 별, RR: byeol, lit. "star") By chance, Dr. Kim discovers Byul's secret: she had brought with her an advanced form of technology that can record, and even lock, memories and convert them into video. In order to closely study this alien technology, Dr. Kim isolates himself from his family to work secretly on Byul in what he calls the "Beta Project." Dr. Kim never goes back home, making the twin Bum-gyun think Byul has taken their father captive, though Woo-jin believes their father has abandoned them.

In 2017, Woo-jin (Yeo Jin-goo), now a 21-year-old college student in neuroscience, feels that a series of suicides in his university is somehow linked to Bum-gyun (Ahn Woo-yeon), who has been searching for aliens, particularly Byul. While in pursuit of the case, Woo-jin meets Han Jung-yeon (Gong Seung-yeon), a computer science student who, to his great shock, looks very much like Byul. She is also investigating the multiple suicides, all of which she thinks are actually murder.

In 2037, South Korea is now divided into Normal Earth, (Note: 일반지구; ilbanjigu) a heavily polluted place where crimes are rampant, and Smart Earth, (Note: 스마트지구; seumateujigu) a clean, peaceful, and crime-free city. Kim Joon-hyuk (Kim Kang-woo) is a Normal Earth crimes detective who tries to get into Smart Earth to investigate a case of twin brothers who went missing in 2017. In doing so, he starts to uncover the dark truth lurking behind Smart Earth being "crime-free."

Each episode of the drama, except the last, contains two parts: Part 1: Beta Project, (Note: 베타 프로젝트, RR: Beta peurojekteu) which contains a plot set in 2017, and Part 2: A Great New World, (Note: 멋진 신세계, RR: Meotjin sinsegye) which contains a plot set in 2037. The two plots merge in the twelfth and final episode of the series, titled Circle: One World. (Note: 써클: 하나의 세겨; sseokeul: hanaui segyeo)

== Cast ==
=== Main ===
- Yeo Jin-goo as Kim Woo-jin (Beta Project) / Circulate 3 (A Great New World)
  - Jung Ji-hoon as young Woo-jin

a 21-year-old second-year university student in the Department of Neuroscience in Handam University of Science and Technology in the year 2017; Bum-gyun/Joon-hyuk's "younger" twin brother and son of Dr. Kim Kyu-chul
In his younger years, Woo-jin was an enthusiast about UFOs and extraterrestrial life. He witnessed (with Bum-gyun and Dr. Kim) the arrival on Earth of a female humanoid alien, which he names "Byul." His passion faded when his father disappeared with Byul. In 2017, he meets Byul (now Han Jung-yeon) once again, and together they investigate the serial suicides in the university, with the help of Detective Hong Jin-hong.

- Kim Kang-woo as Kim Joon-hyuk (future and amnesia's Kim Bum-gyun)
  - Ahn Woo-yeon as 21-year-old Kim Bum-gyun
  - Kim Ye-jun as young Bum-gyun

(A Great New World) a 41-year-old violent crimes detective from Normal Earth in the year 2037; Woo-jin's "elder" twin brother and son of Dr. Kim Kyu-chul
Joon-hyuk enters Smart Earth to investigate cases happening within the supposedly "crime-free" city, with the help of Detective Hong Jin-hong and the alien hacker Jung-yeon a.k.a. Bluebird. Twenty years before (as Kim Bum-gyun) he was consumed with aliens on earth and had, in fact, been in a psychiatric hospital and prison for his seemingly mad behaviours. By 2017, he was investigating the series of suicides at Handam University of Science and Technology that he believed were brought about by aliens. He loses his memories later on; Detective Hong gives him his new name, "Joon-hyuk" and he enters the police force.

- Gong Seung-yeon as Han Jung-yeon (a.k.a. Byul, Bluebird)

A humanoid extraterrestrial being whose arrival on Earth was witnessed by the Kim twins and their father.
During her arrival in 2007, Byul appeared naked to the Kims and was also mute, having no knowledge of any human language. She becomes close to Woo-jin, who gave her the name "Byul," and she learns how to speak Korean. She is a semi-immortal being, i.e. she never ages and will look the same as long as she lives. She had brought with her an advanced form of alien technology that can record, and even lock, memories and convert them into video. She was taken for scientific research by the twins' neuroscientist father and later loses her memories. She is adopted by Professor Han Yong-woo who named her Han Jung-yeon.
In 2037 (in A Great New World), she becomes a hacker under the codename Bluebird, based from Maurice Maeterlinck's L'oiseau bleu.

- Lee Gi-kwang as Lee Ho-soo

(A Great New World) an intelligent 26-year-old government employee in Smart Earth in the year 2037
Ho-soo is unbelieving at first about the possibility of criminality in Smart Earth and sides with the government. He is tasked to keep watch on Joon-hyuk, who is investigating cases in the "crime-free" city. Upon learning the truth from Joon-hyuk, he becomes confused, but later sides with Joon-hyuk and Bluebird to take down the unjust powers controlling Smart Earth.

=== Supporting ===
==== Part 1: Beta Project ====
===== People around Woo-jin =====
- Jung In-sun as Park Min-young

a 21-year-old medical student who fell in love with Bum-gyun in 2017. She helped Bum-gyun, Woo-jin, Jung-yeon, and Detective Hong Jin-hong in investigating the serial suicides in the university.

- Seo Hyun-chul as Detective Hong Jin-hong

He is a police detective who began investigating the serial suicides in Handam University of Science and Technology, along with Woo-jin, Jung-yeon, and Min-young. He becomes suspended due to his involvement with the case.

- Kim Joong-ki as Dr. Kim Kyu-chul

He is the father of the twins Kim Woo-jin and Kim Bum-gyun (Kim Joon-hyuk). He is a neuroscientist specializing in treating trauma, working together with fellow neuroscientist Han Yong-woo, taking advantage of Byul's special memory-controlling technology.

- Shin Dam-soo as Detective Choi

Detective Hong's junior who is working for another boss

===== Handam University people =====
- Song Young-gyu as Han Yong-woo

He is a professor and the dean of the Department of Neuroscience in Handam University of Science and Technology. He once worked together with Dr. Kim Kyu-chul in treating traumas using Byul's special technology. He became Byul's father a year after she came on Earth.

- Han Sang-jin as Park Dong-gun

an associate professor of the Department of Neuroscience in Handam University of Science and Technology

- Shin Joo-hwan as Lee Hyun-suk

a third-year student and research assistant in the Department of Neuroscience in Handam University of Science and Technology.

==== Part 2: A Great New World ====
===== Normal Earth people =====
- Kim Min-kyung as Dr. Park Min-young

In 2037, she has become a skilled doctor and Joon-hyuk/Bum-gyun's girlfriend. She would always help him during investigations, especially in times when her expertise is needed.

- Seo Hyun-chul as Detective Hong Jin-hong

He is reinstated in the police force as a member of the cybercrimes unit. In 2037, he helps Joon-hyuk in his investigations in Smart City.

- Oh Eui-shik as Lee Dong-soo
  - Jung Joon-won as young Dong-soo (in Beta Project)

a skilled hacker whom Joon-hyuk usually enlists during investigations. He was Woo-jin's former tutee.

- Kwon Hyuk-soo as Detective Oh

===== Smart Earth people =====
- Min Sung-wook as Lee Hyun-suk

In 2037, he is now an employee in Human B

- Han Sang-jin as Park Dong-gun

In 2037, he becomes the South Korea's Minister of Science and Economy

- Nam Myung-ryul as Yoon Hak-joo

Mayor of Smart City

- Lee Hwa-kyum (Note: Credited as Lee Yoo-young.) as Secretary Shin
- Choi Ji-hun as Kim Min-ji

=== Others ===
- Cha Myung-wook as Park Jin-gyu
- Jeon Suk-kyung (Voice)
- Kang Chung-hoon (Voice)
- Ryu Eun-ji (Voice)
- Park Young-jae (Voice)
- Park Ji-a as Woman Waiting for Bus (Ep. 1, Part 2)
- Park Eun-ji
- Johyun as Announcer in A Great New World (Ep. 1)
- Jang Ji-woo as Smart City Security Agent (Ep. 1, Part 2)
- Jang Joo-hee
- Kim Sa-hee as Doctor in Smart City
- Choi Sung-jae as Humans B Central Control Room Agent
- Kim Ji-sung as Kim Nan-hee
- Taeha as Choi Soo-bin (Ep. 3 and 7, Part 2)

Lee Ho-soo's deceased girlfriend.

- Ha Yoon-seo as Kang So-yoon
- Noh Haeng-ha as Sister Kim
- Lee Myung-hoon as Section Chief Go

== Original soundtrack ==
Circle OST

Soundtrack album by Various artists
- Released: 2017
- Genre: Soundtrack
- Languages: Korean, English
- Label: CJ E&M

=== Part 1 ===
No.	Title	Lyrics	Music	Artist	Length
1.	"Walk With Me" (같이 걸을까)	Lee Juck	Lee Juck; Kwak Jin-eon	Kwak Jin-eon	03:11
2.	"Walk With Me" (Inst.)		Lee Juck; Kwak Jin-eon		03:11
Total length:					06:22

=== Part 2 ===
No.	Title	Lyrics	Music	Artist	Length
1.	"Alive"	1601; Andup; Kim Mi-jin	1601	UJi (Bestie) feat. Andup	02:59
2.	"Alive" (Inst.)		1601		02:59
Total length:					05:58

== Ratings ==
Average TV viewership ratings
Ep.	Original broadcast date	Average audience share		
Ep.	Original broadcast date	Nielsen Korea		TNmS
Ep.	Original broadcast date	Nationwide	Seoul	Nationwide
1	May 22, 2017	2.883%	3.771%	2.7%
2	May 23, 2017	2.337%	3.116%	2.1%
3	May 29, 2017	2.133%	2.646%	2.2%
4	May 30, 2017	2.250%	2.735%	2.3%
5	June 5, 2017	1.702%	2.104%	2.0%
6	June 6, 2017	2.188%	2.688%	2.6%
7	June 12, 2017	2.053%	2.309%	2.0%
8	June 13, 2017	1.866%	1.972%	2.2%
9	June 19, 2017	1.587%	1.986%	2.1%
10	June 20, 2017	1.820%	2.175%	2.0%
11	June 26, 2017	2.160%	2.812%	1.9%
12	June 27, 2017	2.455%	2.776%	2.2%
Average		2.125%	2.591%	2.2%
In the table above, the blue numbers represent the lowest ratings and the red numbers represent the highest ratings.; This series aired on a cable channel/pay TV which normally has a relatively smaller audience compared to free-to-air TV/public broadcasters (KBS, SBS, MBC and EBS).
