= Hwayi: A Monster Boy =

- Film poster
- Hangul: 화이: 괴물을 삼킨 아이
- Hanja: 화이: 怪物을 삼킨 아이
- RR: Hwai: goemureul samkin ai
- MR: Hwai: koemurŭl samk'in ai
- Directed by: Jang Joon-hwan
- Written by: Park Ju-seok
- Produced by: Lee Jun-dong; Lee Dong-ha; Lee Dae-hee
- Starring: Kim Yoon-seok; Yeo Jin-goo
- Cinematography: Kim Ji-young
- Edited by: Kim Sang-bum; Kim Jae-bum
- Music by: Mowg
- Distributed by: Showbox
- Release date: October 9, 2013
- Running time: 126 minutes
- Country: South Korea
- Language: Korean
- Box office: US$16.4 million

Hwayi: A Monster Boy (Korean: 화이: 괴물을 삼킨 아이) is a 2013 South Korean action thriller film about a 16-year-old boy of the same name (played by Yeo Jin-goo) who is raised by five criminal fathers to become the perfect assassin. It takes pulling the trigger to discover his true identity after he realizes the mystery surrounding his past and his fate. It was the highly anticipated second feature film by director Jang Joon-hwan, a decade after his 2003 cult favorite sci-fi comedy/thriller Save the Green Planet!.

== Plot ==
In the middle of a forest, a notorious five-member crime organization lives together on a deserted farm. One day, following a plan that didn't go as expected, an infant whom they had kidnapped in a blackmailing scheme is left with them. 14 years later, this boy, who is now named Hwa-yi, lives as the son of his five criminal fathers: Seok-tae, the cold but charismatic leader, Ki-tae, a stammering driving expert, Jin-seong, an ideal planner, Beom-soo, a guns expert, and Dong-beom a cold martial artist. Hwa-yi has been brought up in a unique way, learning skills from his five fathers instead of going to school. Though he has adapted to this life, sometimes he longs for the ordinary life of other boys, which seems impossible for him.

The gang plans another crime, which will see Hwa-yi participate for the first time. During a fight, Hwa-yi fires a gun to kill someone. At first, his fingers tremble and the gun shakes but after one shot, he keeps pulling the trigger as though possessed. He finds a picture of a child on the man he shot and soon Hwa-yi starts to uncover a huge secret and his tragic destiny. His life is turned upside down when he learns that the man he killed was his real father. From that moment on, Hwa-yi vows revenge on his gangster fathers, using the devious skills he picked up from a life in crime.

Hwa-yi begins by killing one of five fathers. The rest of them go after him but lose him. Hwa-yi calls them all to Sungji Cement Factory. He also writes a letter to the rival gang and they show up an hour before. Both groups get into a feud. Hwa-yi positions himself at a high vantage point and snipes the men. Soon, everyone is dead except for Seok-tae and Hwa-yi. Seok-tae heads to the hospital where Hwa-yi's mother is admitted, Hwa-yi follows.

To Hwa-yi's mother at the hospital, Seok-tae reveals the story all the way from the orphanage to the kidnapping to raising her child. After this, he kills her and goes back home. Hwa-yi reaches the hospital too late, he goes home to confront Seok-tae. The detective who's been after the notorious gang is also there. The three of them have a standoff. Seok-tae kills the detective and Hwa-yi kills Seok-tae. The film ends with Hwayi sniping the CEO of the rival gang and disappearing into the crowds.

== Cast ==
- Kim Yoon-seok - Seok-tae
- Yeo Jin-goo - Hwa-yi
- Cho Jin-woong - Ki-tae
- Jang Hyun-sung - Jin-seong
- Kim Sung-kyun - Dong-beom
- Park Hae-joon - Beom-soo
- Park Yong-woo - Detective Chang-ho
- Lee Geung-young - Im Hyung-taek
- Yoo Yeon-seok - Park Ji-won
- Moon Sung-keun - CEO Jin
- Jang In-sub as Detective Chang-Ho
- Nam Ji-hyun - Yoo-kyung
- Seo Young-hwa - Im Hyung-taek's wife
- Im Ji-eun - Young-joo
- Kim Young-min - Detective Jung-min
- Woo Jung-gook - blind masseur
- Lee Jun-hyeok - police officer who sees Hwa-yi entering the house
- Han Sung-yong - police officer checking for drunk driving

== Box office ==
Released on October 9, 2013, known as Hangul Day, a national holiday in South Korea, Hwayi: A Monster Boy opened strong at the box office, reaching 1.2 million admissions over its first five days. At the end of its run, it had sold a total of 2,394,418 tickets, with a gross of ₩17,695,189,795.

== Remake ==
Lee Jun-dong, head of Hwayi's production company Now Film, will co-produce an English-language remake with U.S.-based Spanish producer Frida Torresblanco (Pan's Labyrinth). Lee said, "We have decided to take part in the production as a collaborator in order to ensure the quality of the remake, rather than simply handing over the storyline."

== Awards and nominations ==
| Year | Award | Category | Recipient | Result |
|---|---|---|---|---|
| 2013 | 21st Korean Culture and Entertainment Awards | Best New Actor | Yeo Jin-goo | Won |
| 2013 | 33rd Korean Association of Film Critics Awards | Best New Actor | Yeo Jin-goo | Won |
| 2013 | 34th Blue Dragon Film Awards | Best Supporting Actor | Cho Jin-woong | Nominated |
| 2013 | 34th Blue Dragon Film Awards | Best New Actor | Yeo Jin-goo | Won |
| 2013 | 34th Blue Dragon Film Awards | Best New Actress | Nam Ji-hyun | Nominated |
| 2013 | 34th Blue Dragon Film Awards | Best Screenplay | Park Joo-seok | Nominated |
| 2013 | 34th Blue Dragon Film Awards | Best Music | Mowg | Won |
| 2014 | 5th KOFRA Film Awards | Best New Actor | Yeo Jin-goo | Won |
| 2014 | 50th Paeksang Arts Awards | Best New Actor | Yeo Jin-goo | Nominated |
| 2014 | 14th Director's Cut Awards | Best New Actor | Yeo Jin-goo | Won |
| 2014 | 23rd Buil Film Awards | Best New Actor | Yeo Jin-goo | Nominated |
| 2014 | 51st Grand Bell Awards | Best New Actor | Yeo Jin-goo | Nominated |
