= Kim Seol-hyun =

South Korean actress and singer (born 1995)

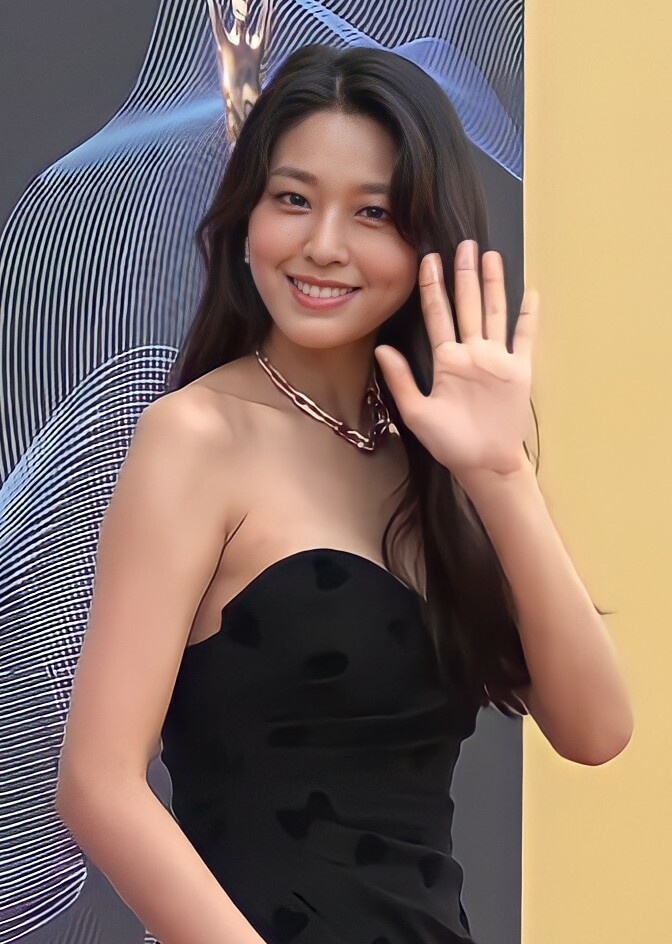
- Kim in 2022
- Born: January 3, 1995 (age 31); Bucheon, South Korea
- Education: Gyeonggi Arts High School
- Occupations: Actress; singer
- Agent: The Present Company
- Musical career
- Genre: K-pop
- Instrument: Vocals
- Years active: 2012–present
- Label: FNC
- Member of: AOA; AOA White

Korean name
- Hangul: 김설현
- Hanja: 金雪炫
- RR: Gim Seolhyeon
- MR: Kim Sŏrhyŏn

Kim Seol-hyun (Korean: 김설현; born January 3, 1995), better known by her mononym Seolhyun, is a South Korean actress and singer. She is a former member of the South Korean girl group AOA and she has starred in television dramas Orange Marmalade (2015), My Country: The New Age (2019), Awaken (2020–2021), and film Memoir of a Murderer (2017).

== Early life and education ==
Seolhyun was born on January 3, 1995, in Ojeong-gu, Bucheon, South Korea. She has an older sister named Joo-hyun, who is a fashion editor for Cosmopolitan. She attended Kachiul Elementary School, Sungkok Middle School and Gyeonggi Arts High School.

== Career ==
=== 2012–2014: AOA and acting debut ===
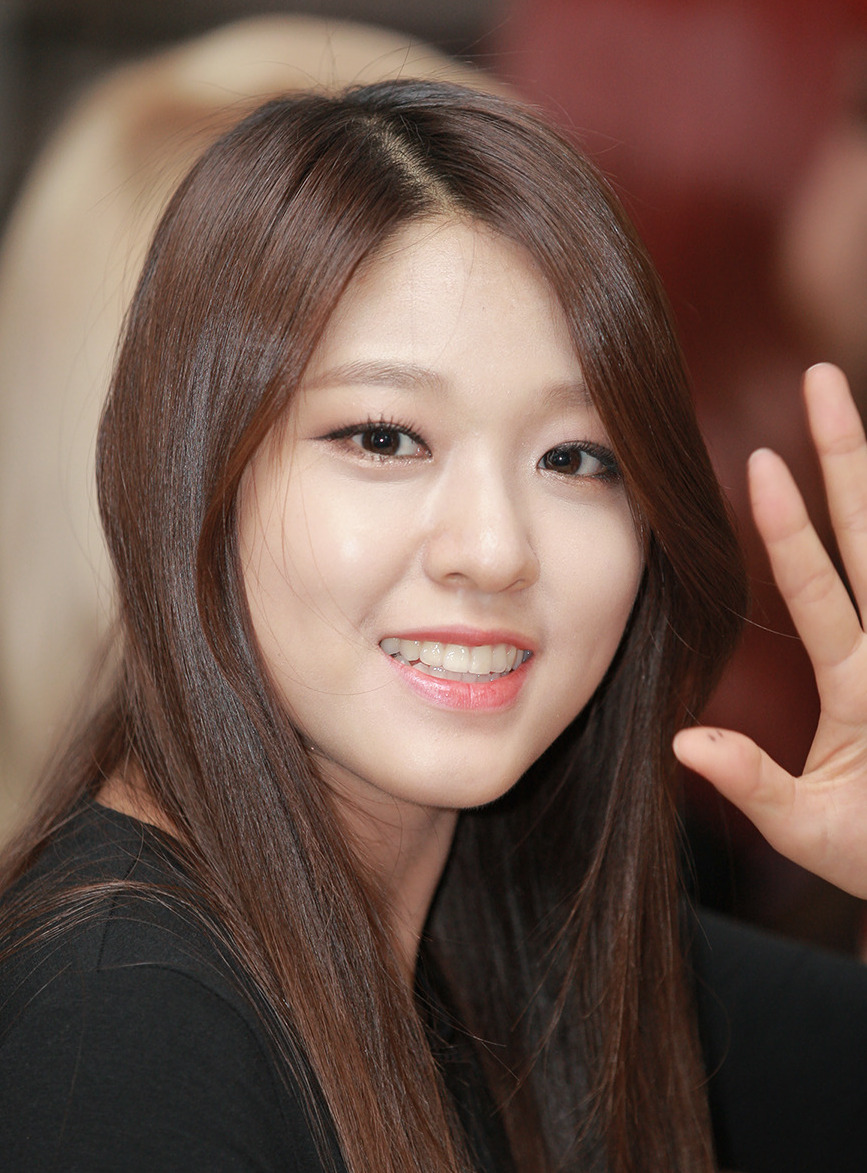
Kim in 2013

In 2010, Seolhyun won the 8th Smart Model Contest (스마트 모델 선발 대회), a competition in which ordinary students wear uniforms. At the event, several talent agencies were present, including FNC Entertainment, whom Seolhyun was scouted by. She has also appeared in the music video for boy band F.T. Island's song "Severely" from the EP Grown-Up.

On July 30, 2012, Seolhyun made her debut as a member of AOA on Mnet's M Countdown with the song "Elvis" from their debut single album, Angels' Story. Soon afterwards, she made her acting debut in the television drama Seoyoung, My Daughter, playing the role of Lee Jung-shin's girlfriend.

In 2013, she was cast in the daily drama Ugly Alert. She played the youngest daughter of the family, a bright girl who dreams of becoming an actress. Seolhyun stated, "I'm nervous about doing a new project, and I'm also burdened. But I want to work hard again by thinking of it as another learning experience. I also want to touch the hearts of people".

=== 2015–present: Acting roles and rising popularity ===
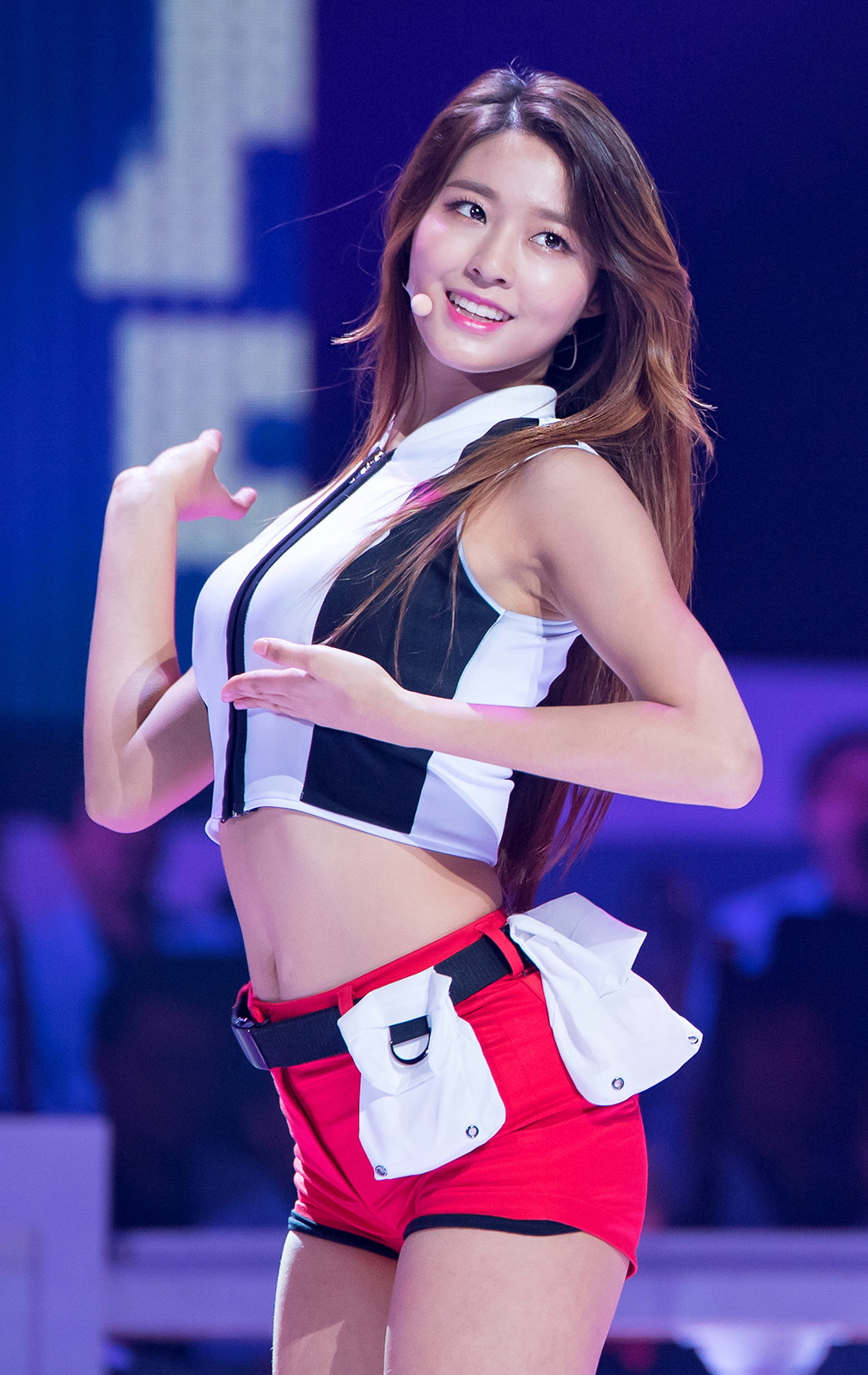
Kim performing in 2016

Seolhyun first attracted attention with her appearance on the KBS variety show, Brave Family (2015), where she charmed viewers with boyish and unaffected demeanor. Later that year, she gained fame through a commercial for SK Telecom which led to increased advertising offers for the star.

The same year, Seolhyun starred in KBS's vampire romance Orange Marmalade. Although it racked a mere two percent viewer ratings, the show brought her praise for her acting. She also featured in the action noir film Gangnam Blues, and won a "popular star" award at the 36th Blue Dragon Film Awards. Seolhyun, along with Gangnam co-star Lee Min-ho were selected as promotional ambassadors for "Visit Korea Year".

In January 2016, Seolhyun was named "Model of the Year" at the 2015 TVCF Awards; having modeled for noteworthy brands across industries such as fashion, food and beverage, cosmetics and e-commerce. She placed second in a study conducted by Korea Broadcast Advertising Corporation (Kobaco) to select the top spokesmodel by consumers. In March 2016, Seolhyun was selected as an official ambassador to Korea national elections in 2016.

In May 2017, Seolhyun was cast in historical film The Great Battle, directed by Kim Kwang-sik. Principal photography started in August and the film premiered in 2018. She then starred in the thriller Memoir of a Murderer, playing the role of a murderer's daughter.

In 2019, Seolhyun was cast as female lead in JTBC's historical drama My Country: The New Age. This marks her first small-screen role in four years.

In 2020, Seolhyun was cast in tvN's romantic mystery drama Awaken, which aired November 30, 2020.

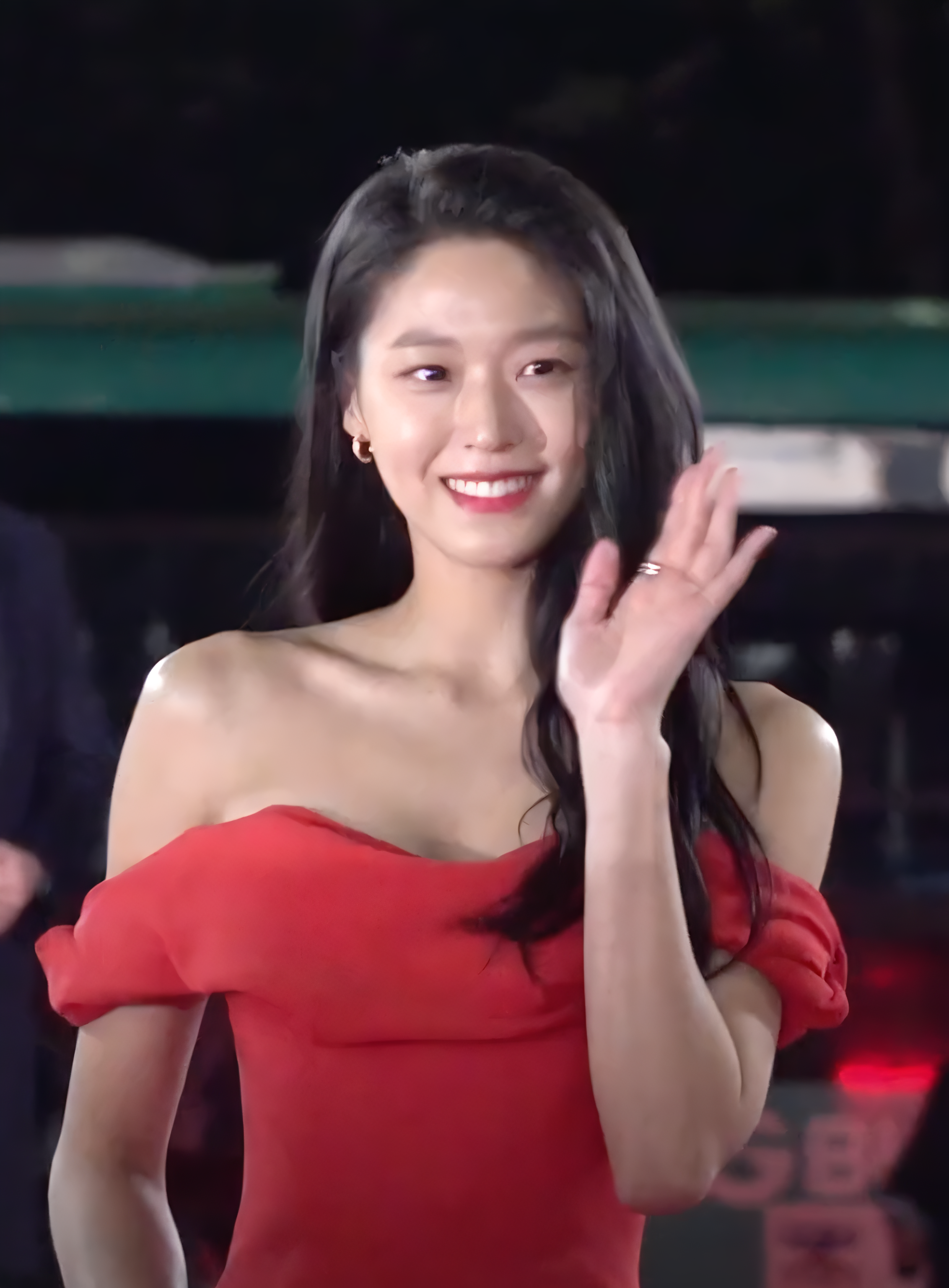
Kim in November 2021

At the end of 2021, Seolhyun hosted the KBS Song Festival along with Cha Eun-woo and Rowoon.

In October 2022, Seolhyun decided not to renew her contract with FNC Entertainment. In November, Seolhyun signed with Ieum Hashtag.

In October 2025, Seolhyun left Ieum Hashtag and signed with new agency The Present Company.

== Personal life ==
=== Philanthropy ===
In February 2018, Kim and CNBLUE's Lee Jung-shin traveled to Kalaw, Myanmar to volunteer at the 4th LOVE FNC school for underprivileged children.

== Filmography ==
Key
†	Denotes films that have not yet been released

=== Film ===
Film appearances
Year	Title	Role	Notes	Ref.
2015	Gangnam Blues	Kang Seon-hye		
2017	Memoir of a Murderer	Kim Eun-hee		
2018	The Great Battle	Baek-ha		
2020	P1H: The Beginning of a New World	Seolhyun	Special appearance	

=== Television series ===
Television series appearances
Year	Title	Role	Notes	Ref.
2012	Seoyoung, My Daughter	Seo Eun-soo		
2013	Ugly Alert	Gong Na-ri		
2015	Orange Marmalade	Baek Ma-ri		
2016	Click Your Heart	The school goddess	Cameo	
2019	My Country: The New Age	Han Hee-jae		
2020–2021	Awaken	Gong Hye-won		
2022	The Killer's Shopping List	Do Da-hee		
2022	Summer Strike	Lee Yeo-reum		
2024	Light Shop	Lee Ji-young		
TBA	Tantara †	Min-hui	Post-production	

=== Television shows ===
Television show appearances
Year	Title	Role	Notes	Ref.
2015	Brave Family	Main cast		
2016	Law of the Jungle in Tonga	Main cast	Episodes 208–211	
2021	Document ON – Forest, Embracing People	Narrator		

=== Hosting ===
Hosting appearances
Year	Title	Notes	Ref.
2015	KBS Entertainment Awards	With Shin Dong-yup and Sung Si-kyung	
2016	KBS Song Festival	With Park Bo-gum	
2017	One K Concert In Manila	With Choi Min-ho	
2018	2018 KBS Entertainment Awards	With Shin Hyun-joon and Yoon Shi-yoon	
2019	SBS Gayo Daejeon	With Jun Hyun-moo	
2021	KBS Song Festival	With Cha Eun-woo and Rowoon	
2022	31st Seoul Music Awards	With Kim Sung-joo and Boom	

== Accolades ==
=== Awards and nominations ===
Name of the award ceremony, year presented, category, nominee of the award, and the result of the nomination
Award ceremony	Year	Category	Nominee / Work	Result	Ref.
APAN Star Awards	2015	Best New Actress	Orange Marmalade	Nominated	
Asia Artist Awards	2018	New Wave Award	Kim Seol-hyun	Won	
Asian Film Awards	2016	Best Newcomer	Gangnam Blues	Nominated	
Baeksang Arts Awards	2015	Best New Actress – Film	Gangnam Blues	Nominated	
Blue Dragon Film Awards	2015	Popular Star Award	Kim Seol-hyun	Won	
Blue Dragon Film Awards	2015	Best New Actress	Gangnam Blues	Nominated	
Fashionista Awards	2016	Best Fashionista – Red Carpet Category	Kim Seol-hyun	Nominated	
Fashionista Awards	2017	Best Fashionista – Red Carpet Category	Kim Seol-hyun	Nominated	
Grand Bell Awards	2015	Best New Actress	Gangnam Blues	Nominated	
Grand Bell Awards	2018	Woori Bank Star Award	Kim Seol-hyun	Won	
InStyle Star Icon	2016	Best Body – Female Celebrity	Kim Seol-hyun	Nominated	
KBS Drama Awards	2015	Popularity Award, Actress	Orange Marmalade	Won	
KBS Drama Awards	2015	Best New Actress	Orange Marmalade	Nominated	
KBS Drama Awards	2015	Best Couple Award	Kim Seol-hyun (with Yeo Jin-goo); Orange Marmalade	Nominated	
KBS Entertainment Awards	2015	Best Newcomer Award	Brave Family	Won	
Korea Drama Awards	2015	Best New Actress	Orange Marmalade	Nominated	
LA Web Fest	2023	Outstanding Female Performance (Drama)	Summer Strike	Won	
Marie Claire Film Festival	2016	Rookie Award	Gangnam Blues	Won	
Max Movie Awards	2016	Rising Star Award	Gangnam Blues	Won	
SBS Entertainment Awards	2016	Best Entertainer Award	Law of the Jungle in Tonga	Won	
Seoul TV CF Awards	2016	Model of the Year	Kim Seol-hyun	Won	
Style Icon Asia	2016	Awesome Syndrome	Kim Seol-hyun	Won	
The Seoul Awards	2017	Best New Actress (Film)	Memoir of a Murderer	Nominated	

=== Listicles ===
Name of publisher, year listed, name of listicle, and placement
Publisher	Year	Listicle	Placement	Ref.
Forbes	2016	Korea Power Celebrity 40	33rd	
Forbes	2019	Korea Power Celebrity 40	16th	
