= Academic grading in South Korea =

Academic grading in South Korea depends on the type of school in which it is involved. In university, the grade runs upon a letter-type grade similar to American schools. The letter grades can add up to different numbered averages, from 0.0 to 4.5. The letter system applies to middle school as well.

== Suumiyangga system ==
All Korean Secondary Schools, from the Japanese colonial days, traditionally used to have a five-point grading system called Pyeongeoje (평어제,評語制), which converted the student's raw score in mid-terms and finals (out of 100) to five grading classes.The system was a modification from the Japanese grading system of shuyuryoka(秀良可) with the addition of the class mi (美), and removal of nin (認) and fuka (不可).The system was first officially introduced to the Korean peninsula in 1943. The most modern version of suumiyangga after the liberation of Korea was created by Shim Tae Jin (심태진). The system was abolished in Korean elementary schools in 1998. South Korean middle schools were the last institution to use it until 2012. The grades that were available through the system were:

- Su (수,秀): 91-100%, equivalent to A grade
- U (우,優): 81-90%, equivalent to B grade
- Mi (미,美): 71-80%, equivalent to C grade
- Yang (양,良): 61-70% equivalent to D grade
- Ga (가,可): Below 60% equivalent to E grade

Students were generally not held back in Korean schools. Thus a grade of 'E(가,可)' was still a passing grade.

== Current system ==
In October 2004, the Ministry of Education changed the high school academic grading system from absolute(절대등급) to relative evaluation(상대등급).

The revised grading system provides for 9 ranks based on students' relative standing amongst all others taking the same class that semester.

Rank (등급)	1	2	3	4	5	6	7	8	9
Percentage	4%	7%	12%	17%	20%	17%	12%	7%	4%
Aggregate Percentile	4%	11%	23%	40%	60%	77%	89%	96%	100%

In South Korea, depending on each school, the perfect score is represented as either 4.0, 4.3, or 4.5. The latter is the most commonly used system in the country. Some schools regard A+ and A0 as equal.

Many universities use one amongst the following gradations:

Letter	Percent
A+	95-100%
A	90-95%
B+	85-90%
B	80-85%
C+	75-80%
C	70-75%
D+	65-70%
D	60-65%
F	<60%

Letter Grade	Grade Point
A+	4.5
A	4.0
B+	3.5
B	3.0
C+	2.5
C	2.0
D+	1.5
D	1.0
F	0.0
P	Not Counted (without credit course, pass)
S	Counted (credit is counted without any specific grade)
I	Not Counted (Incomplete)

A+	4.3
A0	4.0
A−	3.7
B+	3.3
B0	3.0
B−	2.7
C+	2.3
C0	2.0
C−	1.7
D+	1.3
D0	1.0
D−	0.7 (lowest passing grade)
F	0.0 (No Credit)
S	Satisfactory (credit is awarded, but no grade is given)
U	Unsatisfactory (credit is not awarded, and no grade is given)
