= Yeo Jin-goo =

South Korean actor (born 1997)

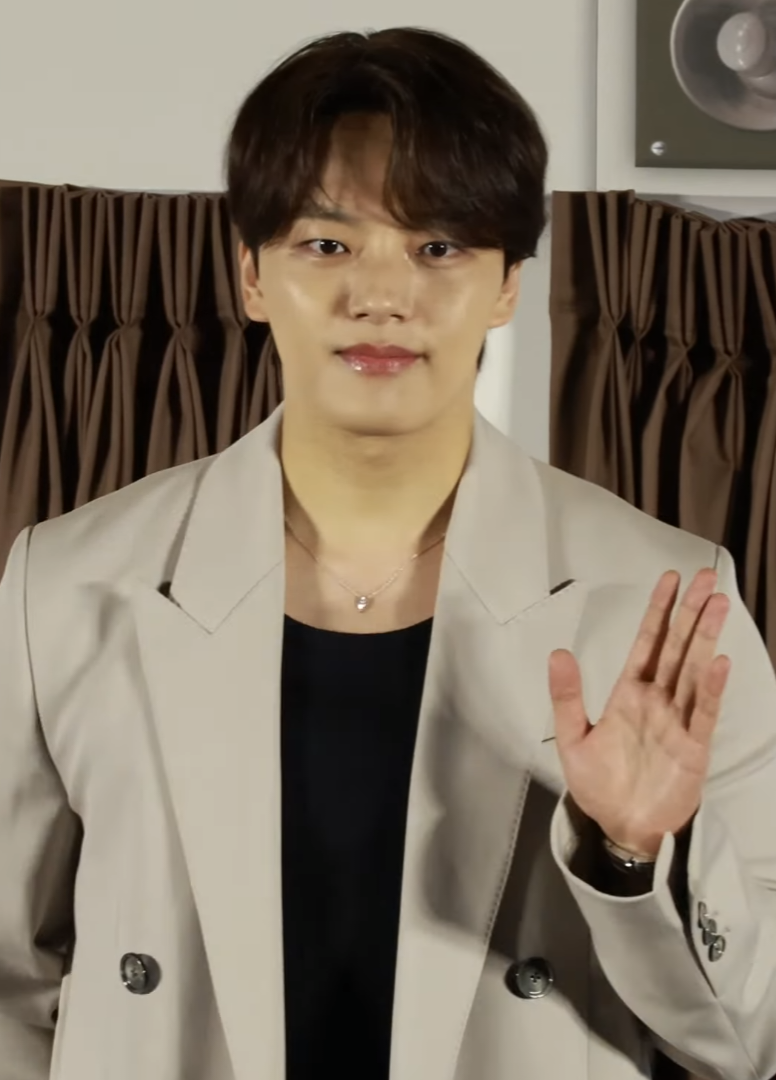
- Yeo in May 2024
- Born: August 13, 1997 (age 29); Seoul, South Korea
- Other name: Yeo Jin-gu
- Education: Chung Ang University (Department of Theater)
- Occupation: Actor
- Years active: 2005–present
- Agent: J-Full Entertainment
- Works: Filmography

Korean name
- Hangul: 여진구
- Hanja: 呂珍九
- RR: Yeo Jingu
- MR: Yŏ Chin'gu

Signature
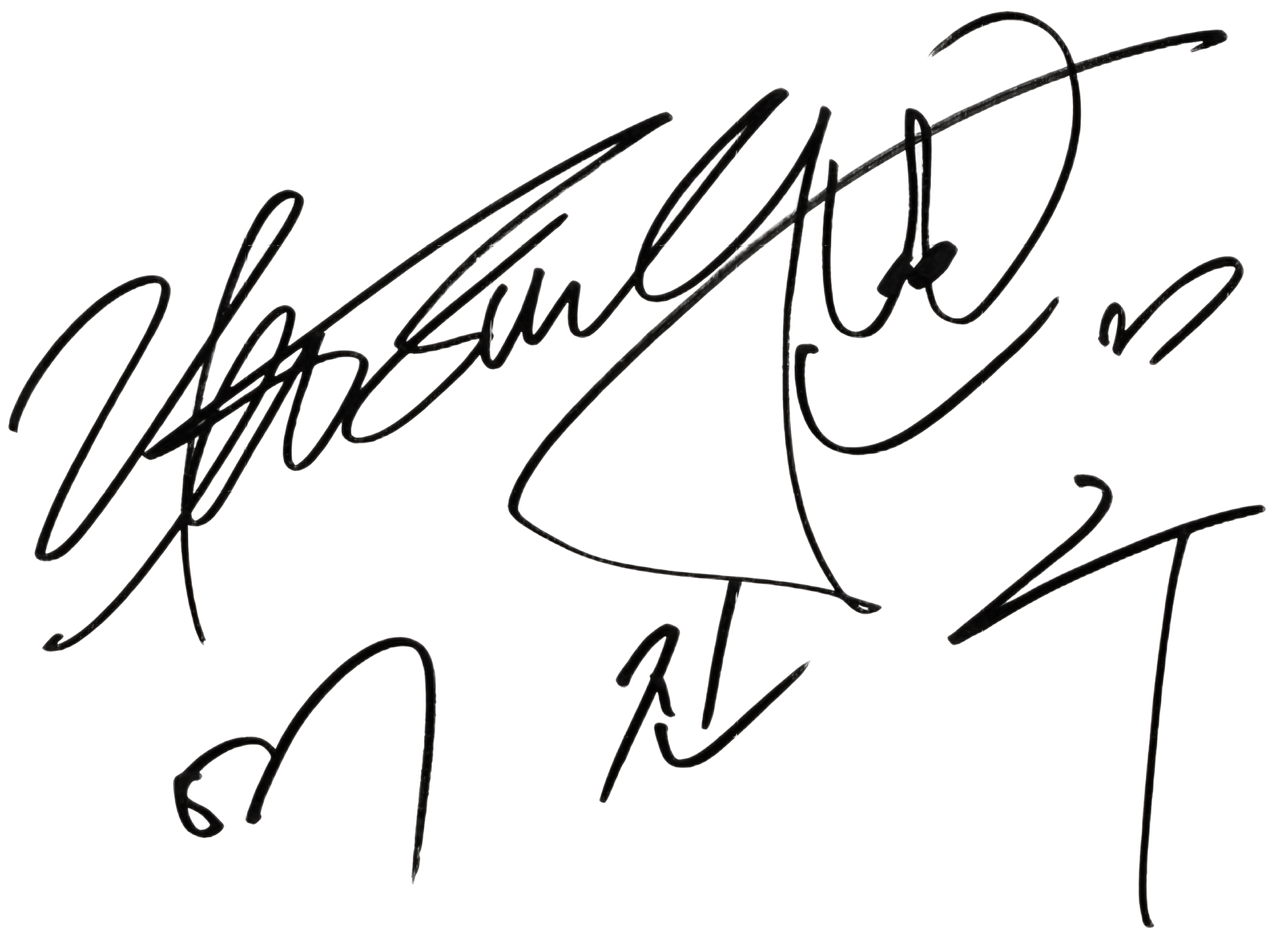

Yeo Jin-goo (Korean: 여진구; Hanja: 呂珍九, born August 13, 1997) is a South Korean actor. Yeo began his career as a child actor, debuting in the film Sad Movie (2005). Nicknamed "Nation's Little Brother", he went on to play the younger characters of the lead roles in films and television series such as in A Frozen Flower (2008), Giant (2010), Moon Embracing the Sun (2012), and Missing You (2012). He is known for playing the title character in the action thriller Hwayi: A Monster Boy (2013), for which he won the Blue Dragon Film Award for Best New Actor.

Since then, he has taken on lead roles in the films Shoot Me in the Heart (2015), The Long Way Home (2015), and Warriors of the Dawn (2017). He has also starred in the popular television series such as The Crowned Clown (2019), Hotel del Luna (2019), and Beyond Evil (2021).

== Early life and education ==
Yeo was born on August 13, 1997 in Gwanak District, Seoul, South Korea. He is the eldest of two siblings and has a younger brother. As a child, Yeo wanted to appear on television and therefore asked his parents to let him try acting. With the support of his parents, he took acting lessons and eventually made his debut on the big-screen with Sad Movie (2005).

He graduated from Namgang High School, an all boys high school, in 2016. In the same year he started studying at Chung-Ang University, majoring in the Department of Theater.

== Career ==
=== 2005–2011: Beginnings as a child actor ===
In 2005, Yeo made his debut at the age of eight in the film Sad Movie. He auditioned for the role of Park Hwi-chan and was chosen among 150 candidates despite having no previous acting experience. In 2006, he appeared in his first television drama I Want to Love, playing a sickly child of a single mother; followed by his first role in a sageuk drama Yeon Gaesomun as young Kim Heum-soon.

In 2008, he played the younger version of the lead roles in the series Iljimae and Tazza. He won his first acting award as Best Child Actor at the SBS Drama Awards for both dramas.

In 2010, he starred in the drama Giant as the younger counterpart to Lee Beom-soo's character. According to Yeo, this was the first time he fully immersed himself in a role and began taking acting seriously.

In 2011, he played the younger part of the title character in the historical drama Warrior Baek Dong-soo. He also made a brief appearance as teenage Ddol-bok in the drama Deep Rooted Tree. The appearance was upon the request of its lead actor Jang Hyuk, who took a liking to Yeo when the latter portrayed his younger version in the drama Tazza.

=== 2012: Rising popularity ===
In 2012, Yeo rose to prominence when he starred in the fantasy-period drama Moon Embracing the Sun, playing the role of a young crown prince. The drama surpassed 40% in ratings and gained "national drama" status. This was followed by a well-received turn in melodrama Missing You. He won Best Young Actor at the 2012 MBC Drama Awards for his portrayal in both dramas.

=== 2013–present: Transition to lead roles ===
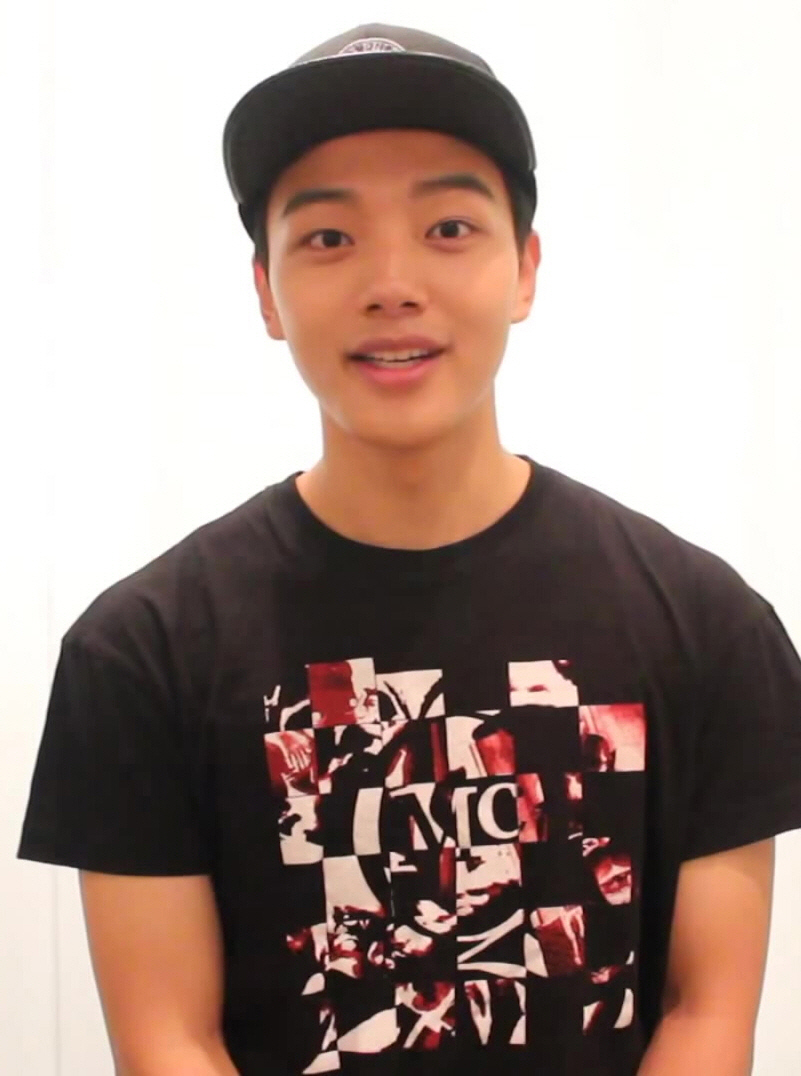
Yeo in 2014

In 2013, Yeo starred as the titular character in action thriller Hwayi: A Monster Boy, for which he garnered praises and won several Best New Actor honors from annual award ceremonies such as Blue Dragon Film Awards and Korean Association of Film Critics Awards. He is the youngest male actor to receive the Best New Actor award in the history of Blue Dragon Film Awards, at the age of sixteen. In the same year, he was also cast in the sitcom, Potato Star 2013QR3 as an aspiring mobile application developer.

In 2015, he starred in the film Shoot Me in the Heart, based on the bestselling novel of the same name by Jeong Yu-jeong. He had his first leading role on television with teen vampire series, Orange Marmalade, based on the webtoon of the same name. He won Best New Actor Award at 2015 KBS Drama Awards for his role. In the same year, he appeared in the Korean War film, The Long Way Home. Veteran actor Sul Kyung-gu, his co-star in the film, strongly recommended Yeo for the role of Yeong-gwang, and only signed the movie contract once Yeo's casting had been finalized.

In 2016, Yeo played the role of King Yeongjo in the SBS drama The Royal Gambler, and won an Excellence Award at the year end SBS Drama Awards.

In 2017, Yeo starred in tvN's science fiction drama Circle, and historical movie Warriors of the Dawn, both of which premiered in May. He was also cast for a special appearance in the star-studded film, 1987: When the Day Comes, based on the June Democratic Uprising. The movie reunited him with Director Jang Joon-hwan and actor Kim Yoon-seok of Hwayi: A Monster Boy. In July, he starred in SBS's romance drama Reunited Worlds.

In 2018, Yeo was cast in the romantic comedy My Absolute Boyfriend, based on the Japanese manga series of the same name. It aired on SBS the following year.

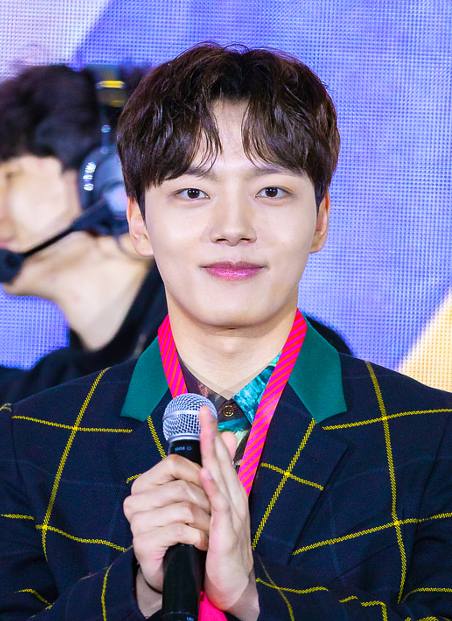
Yeo in 2019

In 2019, he starred in tvN's remake of the 2012 Korean film Masquerade, titled The Crowned Clown, playing dual roles as clown Ha-seon and King Yi Heon for which he received the nomination for the Best Actor - Television at 55th Baeksang Arts Awards. The same year, he was cast in Hong sisters' fantasy mystery drama Hotel del Luna alongside IU. The drama was a commercial success, recording the highest ratings in its timeslot throughout its run.

In 2020, Yeo made a special voice appearance in the drama Start Up as Jang Young Shil, the AI speaker. He also made a live action cameo in the final episode as a start-up owner named Hong Ji Seok.

In 2021, Yeo starred in the psychological thriller drama Beyond Evil directed by Shim Na-yeon alongside Shin Ha-kyun as the main leads which premiered in February and aired on JTBC. Shin Ha-kyun and Yeo previously appeared in the film No Mercy for the Rude (2006) where Yeo played the younger version of Shin's character. And in June 2021, Yeo was confirmed as an MC for Girls Planet 999 which aired on Mnet in August.

In 2022, Yeo starred in the tvN fantasy-melodrama Link: Eat, Love, Kill as a sous chef at a high-end restaurant. Later that year, Yeo made his return to the big screen after five years with Ditto, a remake of the 2000 film of the same name.

In May 2023, Yeo signed with J-Full Entertainment.

In 2024, Yeo portrayed a terrorist and plane hijacker in 2024 disaster film Hijack 1971, which marked his first villainous role in his 19-year career; the events of the film was based on a real-life plane hijacking incident in 1971 when the relationship between North Korea and South Korea became fraught with tensions. In an interview with Singapore's national newspaper The Straits Times, Yeo described it as a challenge to portray an antagonist for the first time in his career and he himself doubted whether he could play it well, but he credited his co-stars Ha Jung-woo and Sung Dong-il for helping him to immerse in the role.

== Ambassadorship ==
Year	Title	Ref.
2010	Youth Unification Education	
2012	Child Protection Institution Child Abuse Prevention Day	
2013	Stop the School Violence	
2014	Vietnam Film Festival	
2014	Seoul International Youth Film Festival	
2014	Nanumyieum (Sharing by Connecting)	
2016–present	Taiwan Tourism	

== Musical theater ==
Year	Title	Role	Ref.
2008	Chorus of Angels	Lee Woo-ri	

== Accolades ==
=== Awards and nominations ===
Name of the award ceremony, year presented, category, nominee of the award, and the result of the nomination
Award ceremony	Year	Category	Nominee / Work	Result	Ref.
Baeksang Arts Awards	2012	Best New Actor – Television	Moon Embracing the Sun	Nominated	
Baeksang Arts Awards	2014	Best New Actor – Film	Hwayi: A Monster Boy	Nominated	
Baeksang Arts Awards	2014	Most Popular – Actor (Film)	Hwayi: A Monster Boy	Nominated	
Baeksang Arts Awards	2015	Most Popular – Actor (Film)	Shoot Me in the Heart	Nominated	
Baeksang Arts Awards	2018	Most Popular Actor	Warriors of the Dawn	Nominated	
Baeksang Arts Awards	2019	Best Actor – Television	The Crowned Clown	Nominated	
Baeksang Arts Awards	2019	V LIVE Favorite Artist (Male)	The Crowned Clown	Nominated	
Blue Dragon Film Awards	2013	Best New Actor	Hwayi: A Monster Boy	Won	
Buil Film Awards	2014	Best New Actor	Hwayi: A Monster Boy	Nominated	
Director's Cut Awards	2014	Best New Actor	Hwayi: A Monster Boy	Won	
Grand Bell Awards	2014	Best New Actor	Hwayi: A Monster Boy	Nominated	
Grand Bell Awards	2015	Best New Actor	Shoot Me in the Heart	Nominated	
Herald Donga TV Lifestyle Awards	2012	Style Icon Rookie	Yeo Jin-goo	Won	
KBS Drama Awards	2010	Best Young Actor	The Reputable Family	Nominated	
KBS Drama Awards	2015	Best New Actor	Orange Marmalade	Won	
KBS Drama Awards	2015	Netizen Award, Actor	Orange Marmalade	Nominated	
KBS Drama Awards	2015	Best Couple Award	Yeo Jin-goo with Kim Seol-hyun; Orange Marmalade	Nominated	
KOFRA Film Awards	2014	Best New Actor	Hwayi: A Monster Boy	Won	
Korean Association of Film Critics Awards	2013	Best New Actor	Hwayi: A Monster Boy	Won	
Korea Best Dresser Swan Awards	2013	The Rising Star	Yeo Jin-goo	Won	
Korean Culture and Entertainment Awards	2013	Best New Actor (Film)	Hwayi: A Monster Boy	Won	
Korea Drama Awards	2012	Best Young Actor	Moon Embracing the Sun	Nominated	
Marie Claire Film Festival	2015	Rookie Award	Shoot Me in the Heart	Won	
MBC Drama Awards	2012	Best Young Actor	Moon Embracing the Sun, Missing You	Won	
MBC Drama Awards	2012	Popularity Award	Moon Embracing the Sun, Missing You	Nominated	
MBC Drama Awards	2012	Best Couple Award	Yeo Jin-goo with Kim You-jung; Moon Embracing the Sun	Nominated	
Mnet 20's Choice Awards	2012	20's Upcoming 20's	Moon Embracing the Sun	Won	
Pierson Movie Festival	2012	Best Child Actor	Moon Embracing the Sun	Won	
Pierson Movie Festival	2014	Trend Choice Award	Yeo Jin-goo	Won	
SBS Drama Awards	2008	Best Young Actor	Iljimae, Tazza, Gourmet	Won	
SBS Drama Awards	2016	Excellence Award, Actor in a Serial Drama	The Royal Gambler	Won	
SBS Drama Awards	2016	Best Couple Award	Yeo Jin-goo with Jang Keun-suk; The Royal Gambler	Nominated	
SBS Drama Awards	2017	Top Excellence Award, Actor in a Wednesday-Thursday Drama	Reunited Worlds	Nominated	
SBS Drama Awards	2019	Top Excellence Award, Actor in a Mid-length Drama	My Absolute Boyfriend	Nominated	
Style Icon Awards	2012	Child Actor to Man	Yeo Jin-goo	Won	
tvN Movies Awards	2017	Most Promising Actor	Hwayi: A Monster Boy	Won	

=== Listicles ===
Name of publisher, year listed, name of listicle, and placement
Publisher	Year	Listicle	Placement	Ref.
Korean Film Council	2021	Korean Actors 200 (Note: Introduces 200 actors that best represent the present and future of Korean cinema to the people in the film industry all over the world.)	Included	
