= Sad Movie =

- Film poster
- Hangul: 새드무비
- RR: Saedeumubi
- MR: Saedŭmubi
- Directed by: Kwon Jong-gwan
- Written by: Hwang Seong-gu; Kwon Jong-gwan
- Produced by: Jeong Hoon-tak
- Starring: Jung Woo-sung; Im Soo-jung; Cha Tae-hyun; Son Tae-young; Yum Jung-ah; Yeo Jin-goo; Shin Min-a; Lee Ki-woo
- Cinematography: Kim Byeong-seo
- Edited by: Kim Sang-bum; Kim Jae-bum
- Music by: Jo Dong-ik
- Distributed by: Lotte Entertainment
- Release date: October 20, 2005
- Running time: 108 minutes
- Country: South Korea
- Language: Korean
- Budget: US$4 million
- Box office: US$7 million

Sad Movie (Korean: 새드무비) is a 2005 South Korean romantic drama film directed by Kwon Jong-gwan, and featuring an ensemble cast. The film was released in South Korean theaters on October 20, 2005, and had a total of 1,066,765 admissions nationwide.

== Plot ==
The film comprises four separate storylines.

Jin-woo is a firefighter who buys a ring for his girlfriend. Her name is Soo-jung, and she works at a TV station as a news translator for the deaf. She is waiting for him to propose, with the rationale that given his dangerous job, she likes the idea of him having to think of her, to hesitate for a while before jumping into danger. He, on the other hand, is waiting for that perfect opportunity and setting, before popping the question.

Suk-hyun tells her unemployed boyfriend Ha-seok that she needs a more stable guy who has a good job. So Ha-seok goes off and finds himself a job helping other couples break up.

Ju-young is a mother is too busy to spend time with her young son Hee-chan, until an illness confines her to a hospital bed. There the mother and son begin to communicate more and more.

Soo-eun is a deaf girl who works as a costumed character mascot in a theme park. There she meets a young artist who she quickly begins to develop feelings for, yet she refuses to take off her mask in front of him because of her scar.

== Cast ==
- Jung Woo-sung as Lee Jin-woo
- Im Soo-jung as Ahn Soo-jung
- Cha Tae-hyun as Jung Ha-seok
- Son Tae-young as Choi Suk-hyun
- Yum Jung-ah as Yeom Ju-young
- Yeo Jin-goo as Park Hee-chan
- Shin Min-a as Ahn Soo-eun
- Lee Ki-woo as Sang-gyu
