= Kim Tae-hee (screenwriter) =

South Korean screenwriter (female)

- Hangul: 김태희
- Hanja: 金泰姬
- RR: Gim Taehui
- MR: Kim T'aehŭi

Kim Tae-hee is a (female) South Korean screenwriter, who made her debut as an assistant writer of Infinite Challenge.

== Dramas ==
- 2006 KBS2 Wed-Thu Miniseries KBS2 Wed-Thu Miniseries The Great Inheritance (ko:위대한 유산)...co-authored
- 2007 KBS2 Drama City Double Ledger Murder Case ...sole author
- 2008 KBS2 Taiga Drama The Great King Sejong (ko:大王世宗) ...co-authored
- 2010 KBS2 Mon-Tue miniseries Sungkyunkwan Scandal (ko: 성균관 스캔들)...sole author
- 2016 KBS2 Mon-Tue miniseries A Beautiful Mind (ko: 뷰티풀 마인드)...sole author
- 2019 tvN Mon/Tue miniseries Designated Survivor: 60 Days (ko: 60일, 지정생존자) ... sole author
- 2022 JTBC Fri-Sat & Sun mini-series Reborn Rich (ko: 재벌집 막내아들) ... co-authored
