= Cho Seung-woo =

South Korean actor (born 1980)

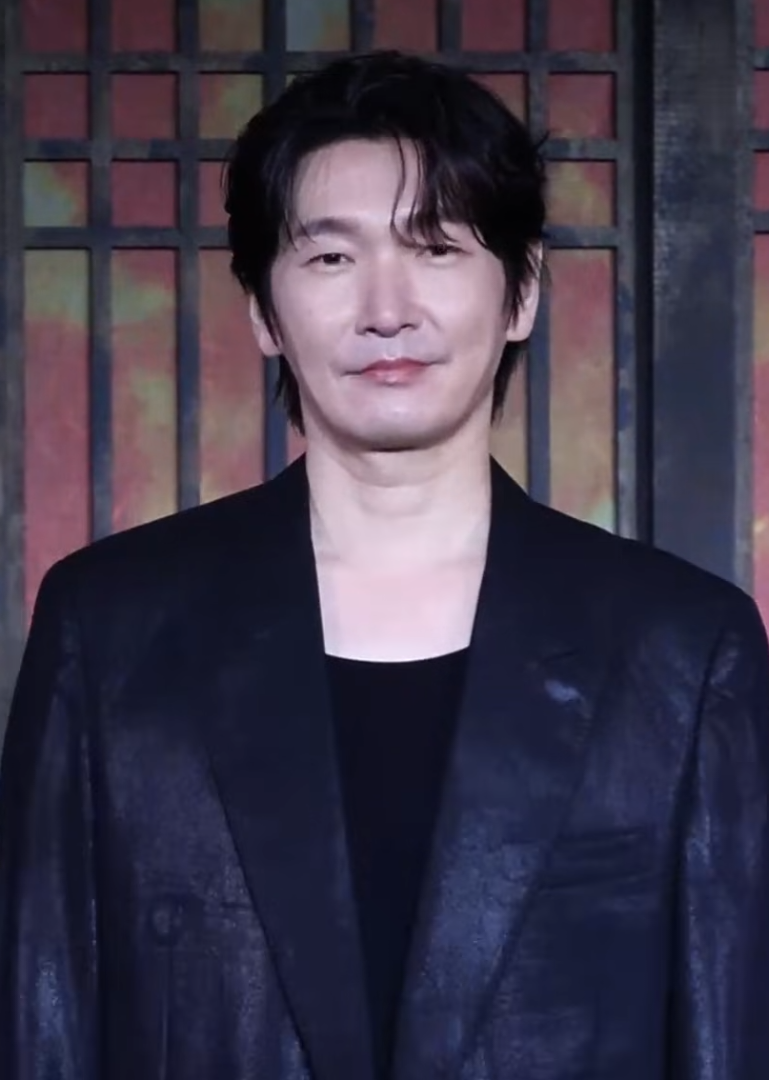
- Cho in July 2026
- Born: March 28, 1980 (age 46); Jamwon-dong, Seocho District, Seoul, South Korea
- Education: Kaywon High School of Arts; Dankook University (Theater and Film)
- Occupations: Actor; singer
- Years active: 2000–present
- Agents: PL Ent. (2000–2015); Goodman Story Ent.
- Father: Cho Kyung-soo
- Relatives: Cho Seo-yeon (sister)

Korean name
- Hangul: 조승우
- Hanja: 曺承佑
- RR: Jo Seungu
- MR: Cho Sŭngu

Cho Seung-woo (Korean: 조승우; born March 28, 1980) is a South Korean actor and singer. He is best known for his leading roles in the films The Classic (2003), Marathon (2005), Tazza: The High Rollers (2006), and Inside Men (2015), as well as in the stage musicals Jekyll & Hyde, Hedwig and the Angry Inch, and Man of La Mancha. He is also known for his leading roles in television dramas The King's Doctor (2012), God's Gift: 14 Days (2014), Stranger (2017–2020), Life (2018), Sisyphus: The Myth (2021), and Divorce Attorney Shin (2023).

== Career ==
=== 2000–2004: Acting debut ===
Cho Seung-woo grew up in a musical family: his father Cho Kyung-soo is a singer, and his older sister Cho Seo-yeon acts in musical theatre. Cho himself also dreamed of becoming a musical actor from an early age, however in 1999 while a student at Dankook University he was persuaded to join auditions for Im Kwon-taek's film Chunhyang, and he ended up winning the part from among a field of 1,000 actors. Chunhyang would screen as the first Korean film in competition at Cannes, although domestically it failed to attract much of an audience.

Cho did go on to appear in musicals after his film debut, acting in local productions Subway Line 1 and The Last Empress. Soon he was drawn back into the film industry, however, with a key supporting role in Wanee & Junah (2001), a villainous turn in H (2002), plus a leading role in Who Are U? (2002). In 2003, Cho acted in Kwak Jae-yong's romance The Classic opposite Son Ye-jin, receiving good reviews for his sincere acting. His popularity continued to grow, and in 2004 he appeared in Im Kwon-taek's 99th film Low Life.

=== 2005: Breakthrough with Marathon and Jekyll & Hyde ===
Cho's breakthrough would come in early 2005 with the smash hit Marathon, where he played an autistic young man who only finds release in running. The film sold over 5 million tickets, and aged 26, Cho won several awards for his performance including Best Actor at the 2005 Grand Bell Awards, Best Actor at 2005 Baeksang Arts Awards in film category, as well as Best Actor in the foreign film category at China's Hundred Flowers Awards. Nonetheless, he continued to pursue his career in musicals, with critically acclaimed appearances in Hedwig and the Angry Inch and Jekyll and Hyde. His success at pursuing both film and musicals make him an unusual case among contemporary actors.

=== 2006–2009: Continued success ===
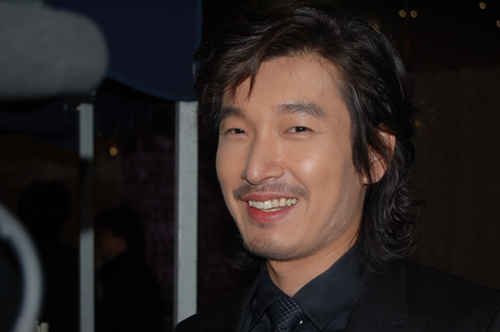
Cho in December 2006

Cho starred in Love Phobia (2006) opposite then-girlfriend Kang Hye-jung; both were praised for their acting, but the melodrama wasn't a commercial success. He then headlined Tazza: The High Rollers with Kim Hye-soo, the 2006 film adaptation of Huh Young-man's same-titled manhwa, which went on to become one of the biggest Korean blockbuster hits of all time. He followed that with Go Go 70s, about a rock and roll band during the height of the Park Chung Hee military regime; and The Sword with No Name, in which he played a fictional royal guard in love with Empress Myeongseong (Soo Ae).

=== 2010–present: Comeback ===
After completing his mandatory military service, Cho made his comeback in the 2010 production of Jekyll and Hyde. The musical was especially meaningful to Cho since the actor rose to stardom when the show premiered in Korea in 2004. Cho's much-anticipated return to the stage was marked with controversy following reports that his salary would be the highest for any musical theatre actor in Korean history. While producers feared that demands for similarly high fees could follow (which could eventually put them out of business), others said that the fee was justified, based on the hope that Cho would help spark a renaissance in a once-vibrant but now-stagnant musical theatre industry. And true enough, when tickets went on sale, the demand was so high that the online reservation server broke down after 15 minutes, with all of the performances in which Cho was scheduled to appear already sold out.

His 2011 sports movie Perfect Game revisited one of the most exciting matches in Korean baseball history, between Choi Dong-won of the Lotte Giants and Sun Dong-yeol of the Haitai Tigers in the summer of 1987, which ended in a tie after being extended 15 innings; the rivalry between the two was further heated up by regionalism at the time with Choi representing the Gyeongsang Province and Sun, the Jeolla Province. Cho starred as Choi opposite Yang Dong-geun as Sun. That same year, Cho also took on the lead role in the musical Zorro.

After lead actor Ju Ji-hoon quit due to vocal chord problems, Cho joined the 2012 stage production of Doctor Zhivago just two weeks ahead of opening, turning the musical into a hit. He and Ryu Deok-hwan then played conjoined twins in actress Ku Hye-sun's sophomore directorial effort The Peach Tree.

Cho made his small screen debut in 2012 with The King's Doctor, a period drama based on a true story about a Joseon-era low-class veterinarian specializing in the treatment of horses who rises to become the royal physician. Cho won the highest award ("Daesang," or Grand Prize) at the MBC Drama Awards for his performance in The King's Doctor, then returned to the stage in 2013 in Hedwig, reprising one of his most memorable musical roles.

Cho continued working in television. He portrayed the poet Yi Sang in Crow's-Eye View, a single-episode anthology as part of MBC's Drama Festival. Cho then starred in the 2014 time travel thriller God's Gift: 14 Days, playing a private investigator who helps a mother (Lee Bo-young) save her child.

Cho reprised one of his most beloved roles in Jekyll and Hyde for the musical's 10th anniversary in late 2014, and the 18,700 tickets sold out in just 10 minutes. Because of his ticket power, he was chosen as among the top 30 most influential people in Korean popular culture in 2006, and for four consecutive years in 2010 to 2014.

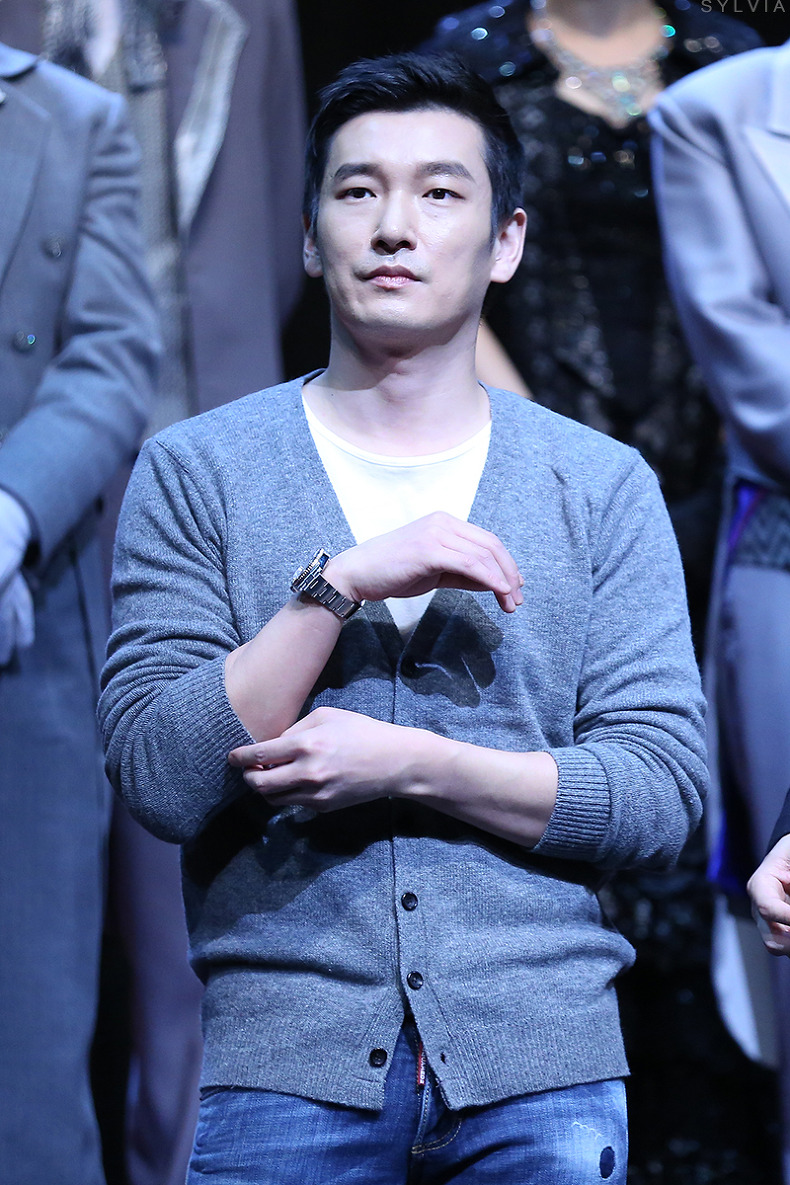
Cho in February 2015

Cho next plays a heroic prosecutor who uncovers bribery in the halls of power in Inside Men, a 2015 film adaptation of Yoon Tae-ho's webtoon The Insiders. Inside Men was a box office success with more than 7 million admissions, becoming Cho's highest-grossing film.

In his interview in July 2016, Cho said that after completion of his performance for the musical Sweeney Todd, he decided to take a three-year hiatus from musical to focus on film.

In 2017, Cho starred in tvN's mystery thriller drama Stranger, playing a prosecutor who lacks empathetic abilities. The series was a hit and gained favorable reviews for its tight plot, gripping sequences and strong performances. Cho's performance in the Stranger also won him an Baeksang Arts Award for Best Actor in TV category.

In 2018, Cho starred in the period film Feng Shui, the third installment of the "divining art trilogy" by Han Jae-rim. He also starred in JTBC's medical drama Life.

In 2020, Cho revived his role in Stranger Season 2 as Hwang Simok.

In 2023, Cho played the titular role in the musical The Phantom of the Opera in Busan, Seoul and Daegu, alternating the part with Choi Jae-rim, Julian Jootaek Kim, and Jeon Dong-seok.

== Filmography ==
=== Film ===
Key
†	Denotes films that have not yet been released

Year	Title	Role	Notes	Ref.
2000	Chunhyang	Lee Mong-ryong		
2001	Ahmijimong	Ahn Ji-hoon	Web film	
2001	Wanee & Junah	Lee Young-min		
2002	Who Are U?	Ji Hyung-tae		
2002	YMCA Baseball Team	Young coachman	Cameo	
2002	H	Shin Hyun		
2003	The Classic	Oh Joon-ha		
2004	Low Life	Choi Tae-woong		
2005	Marathon	Yoon Cho-won		
2006	Love Phobia	Cha Jo-kang		
2006	Tazza: The High Rollers	Kim Gon(Go-ni)		
2008	Go Go 70s	Im Sang-kyu		
2009	The Sword with No Name	Mu-myung(Yo-han)		
2011	Perfect Game	Choi Dong-won		
2012	The Peach Tree	Choi Sang-hyun		
2015	Assassination	Kim Won-bong	Cameo	
2015	Inside Men	Woo Jang-hoon		
2018	Feng Shui	Park Jae-sang		

=== Television series ===
Key
†	Denotes television productions that have not yet been released

Year	Title	Role	Notes	Ref.
2012	The King's Doctor	Baek Gwang-hyun		
2013	Drama Festival – "Lee Sang That Lee Sang"	Lee Sang	Single drama	
2014	God's Gift: 14 Days	Ki Dong-chan		
2017-2020	Stranger	Hwang Shi-mok	Season 1–2	
2018	Life	Koo Seung-hyo		
2021	Sisyphus: The Myth	Han Tae-sul		
2023	Divorce Attorney Shin	Shin Sung-han		
2026	The East Palace	the King		

=== Music video appearances ===
Year	Title	Artist	Ref.
2005	"Another Side of Memory"	Boohwal	YouTube
2005	"Prayer to Overcome Sadness"	Boohwal	YouTube

== Stage ==
=== Musical theatre ===
Year	Title	Role	Theater	Date	Notes
2000	Blood Brothers	Beggar(Narrator)	Hagjeon Blue Small Theater	August 29 – December 31, 2000	
2001	The Last Empress	Gojong	Seoul Arts Center	January 12 – July 7, 2001	
2001	Subway Line 1	Newsboy	Hagjeon Green Small Theater	April 27 – June 17, 2001	
2002	The Sorrows of Young Werther	Werther	Sejong Center for the Performing Arts	February 8 – March 24, 2002	
2003	Carmen	Don José	Universal Arts Center	July 11–27, 2003	
2004–2005	Jekyll & Hyde	Jekyll/Hyde	COEX Auditorium	December 24, 2004 – February 14, 2005	
2005	Hedwig and the Angry Inch	Hedwig/Tommy	Daehangno Live Theater	April 12 – June 26, 2005	
2006	Jekyll & Hyde	Jekyll/Hyde	Seoul Arts Center; National Theater of Korea	January 25 – August 13, 2006	
2006	Subway Line 1	Salesperson	Hagjeon Green Small Theater	March 28, 2006	Cameo
2007	Rent	Roger Davis	Daehangno Seensee Musical Theater	January 7 – February 14, 2007	
2007	Hedwig and the Angry Inch	Hedwig/Tommy	Daehangno Theater SH	March 30 – May 13, 2007	
2007	Man of La Mancha	Miguel de Cervantes/Don Quixote	LG Art Center	August 3 – September 1, 2007	
2007	Pump Boys and Dinettes	Delivery man	Daehangno Art Cente	September 15, 2007	Cameo
2010–2011	Jekyll & Hyde	Jekyll/Hyde	Charlotte Theater	November 30, 2010 – May 7, 2011	
2011	Subway Line 1	Singer	Hagjeon Blue Small Theater	03.10, 03.13, 03.14	Cameo
2011	Blood Brothers	Beggar(Narrator)	Hagjeon Blue Small Theater	03.10, 03.13, 03.14	Cameo
2011–2012	Zorro	Don Diego de la Vega/Zorro	Samsung Electronics Hall	November 4, 2011 – January 15, 2012	
2012	Doctor Zhivago	Yuri Zhivago	Charlotte Theater	February 14 – June 3, 2012	
2013	Hedwig and the Angry Inch	Hedwig/Tommy	Baekam Art Hall	June 8 – September 8, 2013	
2013–2014	Man of La Mancha	Miguel de Cervantes/Don Quixote	Chungmu Art Hall	November 20, 2013 – February 9, 2014	
2014	Hedwig and the Angry Inch	Hedwig/Tommy	Baekam Art Hall	May 13 – October 19, 2014	10th Anniversary
2014–2015	Jekyll & Hyde	Jekyll/Hyde	Samsung Electronics Hall	November 21, 2014 – June 14, 2015	10th Anniversary
2015	Man of La Mancha	Miguel de Cervantes/Don Quixote	D Cube Art Center	July 30 – November 1, 2015	10th Anniversary
2015–2016	Werther	Werther	Seoul Arts Center	November 10, 2015 – January 10, 2016	15th Anniversary
2016	Hedwig: New Makeup	Hedwig/Tommy	Hongik University Daehangno Art Center	March 1 – April 24, 2016	
2016	Sweeney Todd	Sweeney Todd	Charlotte Theater	June 21 – October 3, 2016	
2018–2019	Jekyll & Hyde	Jekyll/Hyde	Charlotte Theater	November 13, 2018 – May 18, 2019	
2019–2020	Sweeney Todd	Sweeney Todd	Charlotte Theater	October 2, 2019 – January 26, 2020	
2021	Man of La Mancha	Miguel de Cervantes/Don Quixote	Charlotte Theater; Chungmu Arts Center	February 3 – May 15, 2021	15th Anniversary
2021	Hedwig and the Angry Inch	Hedwig/Tommy	Chungmu Arts Center	July 30 – October 31, 2021	
2023	The Phantom of the Opera	The Phantom	Dream Theater; Charlotte Theatre	March 25 – November 17, 2023	
2026–2027	Sweeney Todd	Sweeney Todd	D Cube Art Center	December 4, 2026 – May 2, 2027	10th Anniversary

=== Musical concerts ===
Year	Title	Notes/Ref.
2004	Musical Story Show with Lee Seok-joon	Ep. 10 / Ep. 16
2004	Autumn Night Concert	KT&G Family Concert with The Seoul Shinmun
2005	Hedwig and the Angry Inch Concert	
2007	Musical Story Show with Lee Seok-joon	Ep. 100
2008	HEDWIG 10th Anniversary! Hedwig Concert with John Cameron Mitchell and Oh Man-seok	Cameo
2008	Musical Concert, I Am Nam Sam: 30th Anniversary of Nam Kyung-eup's Musical Life	Cameo
2009	Korean National Police University Annual Concert For Public	
2010	Summer Night Concert	

=== Stage play ===
Year	Title	Role	Theater	Date	Notes/Ref.
2024	Hamlet	Hamlet	CJ Towol Theater	October 18 – November 17	

== Discography ==
Soundtrack appearances
Year	Song title	Album	Notes
2001	"Ah-mi's Dream"	Ahmijimong OST	
2002	"Hyung-tae Live" "End"	Who Are U? OST	
2002	"H"	H OST	
2008	"We're Devils" "Mustang Sally" "Soul Man" "I've Been Loving You Too Long (to stop now)" "U Got Me Bad" "The Flame of Youth" "Proud Mary" "Funky Tone" "Land Of A 1000 Dances" "고고춤을 춥시다" "One Of A Kind" "새타령" "Mustang Sally (Twist ver)"	Go Go 70s OST	song by Cho Seung-woo and The Devils
2012	"The Peach Tree"	The Peach Tree OST	
2015	"As Flowers Bloom and Fall"	The Throne OST	
As featured artist
Year	Song Title	Album	Notes
2004	"The Way of the Blessing" "Think about it"	Come to me	Ha Kyung-hye's album
2005	"A Little Thing for You"	Lyrics	Boohwal's album
2009	"Standing on The Road"	Lee Young-mi 1st Single	Lee Young-mi's album
2011	"Standing on The Road"	Love Universe	Lee Young-mi's album
2011	"A Wonderful Saviour Is Jesus My Lord"	I Am Melody 2	Various artists
Original cast recording
Year	Song Title	Album	Notes
2002	"어쩌나 이마음" "우리는 (with Chu Sang-mi)" "사랑하고 있다면 (with Choi Min-chul)" "뭐였을까" "무례와 사랑 (with Kim Pub-lae)" "제발 (with Chu Sang-mi)"	The Sorrows of Young Werther cast recording	
2004	"Lost In the Darkness" "Now there is no choice" "This is the moment" "First Transformation" "Alive" "The way back"	Jekyll & Hyde cast recording	
2005	"Tear Me Down" "Wig in a Box" "Angry Inch (with Kim Da-hyun, Oh Man-seok, Song Yong-jin)"	Hedwig and the Angry Inch cast recording	
2006	"Lost In the Darkness" "I must go on (with Lee Hye-kyung)" "Take me as I am (with Lee Hye-kyung)" "Now there is no choice" "This is the moment" "First Transformation" "Alive" "His work and nothing more (with Lee Hye-kyung, Kim Do-hyung, Kim Bong-hwan)" "Alive Rep." "Obsession" "Dangerous Game (with Kim Sun-young)" "The way back" "Sympathy, Tenderness Rep." "Confrontation" "Finale (with Lee Hye-kyung)" "Dangerous Game (with Lee Young-mi)"	Jekyll & Hyde cast recording	
2006	"Angry Inch (with Song Yong-jin, Kim Soo-yong, Um Ki-joon, Lee Suk-joon, Jo Jung-suk, Kim Da-hyun, Jeon Hye-seon, Ahn Yoo-jin)" "Midnight Radio"	Hedwig and the Angry Inch cast recording	
2007	"Man of La Mancha (with Lee Hoon-jin)" "Dulcinea" "Golden Helmet of Mambrino (with Lee Hoon-jin)" "The Impossible Dream" "Dulcinea Rep. / The Impossible Dream Rep. / Man of La Mancha Rep. (with Kim Sun-young, Lee Hoon-jin)"	Man of La Mancha cast recording	
2013	"Tear Me Down" "The Origin of Love" "Sugar Daddy" "Angry Inch" "Wig in a Box" "Wicked Little Town" "Hedwig's Lament" "Exquisite Corpse" "Wicked Little Town Rep." "Midnight Radio" "The Origin of Love (Acoustic ver)"	Hedwig and the Angry Inch cast recording	with Lee Young-mi and Angry Inch Band
2015	"어쩌나 이마음" "우리는 (with Jeon Mi-do)" "사랑을 전해요 (with Kang Seong-wook)" "두려워 말어" "하룻밤이 천년 (with Jeon Mi-do)" "반가운 나의 사랑 (with Jeon Mi-do, Moon Jong-won)" "발길을 뗄 수 없으면" "뭐였을까" "알 수가 없어 (with Moon Jong-won)" "번갯불에 쏘인 것처럼 (with Jeon Mi-do)" "꽃을 사세요" "오, 카인즈" "구원과 단죄 (with Moon Jong-won)" "다만 지나치지 않게 (with Jeon Mi-do)" "자석산의 전설 Rep. (with Jeon Mi-do)" "발길을 뗄 수 없으면 Rep."	Werther cast recording	
2016	"In Your Arms Tonight" "Tear Me Down" "The Origin of Love" "Scene: Hansel Meets Luther (East Berlin, 1988)" "Sugar Daddy" "Angry Inch" "Wig in a Box" "Wicked Little Town" "Hedwig's Lament" "Exquisite Corpse" "Wicked Little Town Rep." "Midnight Radio" "The Origin of Love (Acoustic ver)"	Hedwig: New Make Up Live Album	with Seomoon Tak and Angry Inch Band

== Bibliography ==
Year	Title	Category	Notes
2004	Alphonse Daudet's Les étoiles	Audiobook	ISBN 9788990683045
2004	Alphonse Daudet's Les étoiles	Audiobook	"별 (The Stars)" "어머니 (Mother)" "코르니유 영감의 비밀 (Master Cornille's Secret)" "마지막 수업 (The Last Lesson)"

== Ambassadorship ==
Year	Title	Organization	Notes/Ref.
2005	PR Ambassador of Hope Broadcast for the Disabled	HMN for the Disabled	
2010	Honorary Police Officer	Korean National Police Agency	with Ryu Soo-young
2012	PR Ambassador for 6th The Musical Awards	The Musical Awards	with Cha Ji-yeon
2013	PR Ambassador for Sapsali campaign	The Korean Sapsali Foundation	

== Accolades ==
=== Awards and nominations ===
Year presented, name of the award ceremony, award category, nominated work and the result of the nomination
Year	Award	Category	Nominated work	Result	Ref.
2000	21st Blue Dragon Film Awards	Best New Actor	Chunhyang	Nominated	
2000	37th Grand Bell Awards	Best New Actor	Chunhyang	Nominated	
2002	8th Korea Musical Awards	Best New Actor	The Sorrows of Young Werther	Nominated	
2004	9th Moscow International Love Film Festival	Best Couple Award with Son Ye-jin	The Classic	Won	
2004	10th Korea Musical Awards	Best Actor	Jekyll & Hyde	Won	
2005	28th Golden Cinema Film Festival	Most Popular Actor	Marathon	Won	
2005	41st Baeksang Arts Awards	Best Actor (Film)	Marathon	Won	
2005	42nd Grand Bell Awards	Best Actor	Marathon	Won	
2005	42nd Grand Bell Awards	Popularity Award	Marathon	Won	
2005	14th Golden Rooster and Hundred Flowers Film Festival	Best Actor in a Foreign Film	Marathon	Won	
2005	6th Busan Film Critics Awards	Best Actor	Marathon	Won	
2005	1st Premiere Rising Star Awards	Best Actor	Marathon	Won	
2005	4th Korean Film Awards	Best Actor	Marathon	Nominated	
2005	13th Chunsa Film Art Awards	Best Actor	Marathon	Nominated	
2005	26th Blue Dragon Film Awards	Best Actor	Marathon	Nominated	
2005	26th Blue Dragon Film Awards	Popular Star Award	Marathon	Won	
2005	Korea Advertisers Association Awards	Best Model Award	—N/a	Won	
2006	1st Golden Ticket Awards	Best Musical Actor	Jekyll & Hyde	Won	
2006	14th Chunsa Film Art Awards	Best Actor	Tazza: The High Rollers	Nominated	
2006	27th Blue Dragon Film Awards	Best Actor	Tazza: The High Rollers	Nominated	
2006	2nd University Film Festival of Korea	Best Actor	Tazza: The High Rollers	Won	
2007	43rd Baeksang Arts Awards	Best Actor (Film)	Tazza: The High Rollers	Nominated	
2007	8th Newport Beach Film Festival	Best Actor	Tazza: The High Rollers	Won	
2007	1st Korea Movie Star Awards	Best Actor	Tazza: The High Rollers	Won	
2007	6th Korean Film Awards	Best Actor	Tazza: The High Rollers	Nominated	
2007	1st The Musical Awards	Best Actor	Jekyll & Hyde	Nominated	
2007	13th Korea Musical Awards	Best Actor	Man of La Mancha	Nominated	
2007	13th Korea Musical Awards	Popularity Award	Man of La Mancha	Won	
2008	3rd Golden Ticket Awards	Best Musical Actor	Man of La Mancha	Won	
2008	2nd The Musical Awards	Best Actor	Man of La Mancha	Won	
2011	5th The Musical Awards	Best Actor	Jekyll & Hyde	Won	
2012	7th Golden Ticket Awards	Best Musical Actor	Jekyll & Hyde	Won	
2012	6th The Musical Awards	Best Actor	Doctor Zhivago	Won	
2012	18th Korea Musical Awards	Best Actor	Doctor Zhivago	Nominated	
2012	MBC Drama Awards	Grand Prize (Daesang)	The King's Doctor	Won	
2012	MBC Drama Awards	Top Excellence Award, Actor in a Special Project Drama	The King's Doctor	Won	
2013	19th Korea Musical Awards	Best Actor	Hedwig and the Angry Inch	Nominated	
2013	19th Korea Musical Awards	Popularity Award	Hedwig and the Angry Inch	Won	
2014	SBS Drama Awards	Top Excellence Award, Actor in a Miniseries	God's Gift: 14 Days	Nominated	
2016	5th Yegreen Musical Award	Best Actor	Werther	Nominated	
2016	5th Yegreen Musical Award	Popularity Award	Werther	Won	
2017	1st Korea Musical Awards	Best Actor	Sweeney Todd	Nominated	
2017	1st The Seoul Awards	Best Actor (Drama)	Stranger	Nominated	
2018	54th Baeksang Arts Awards	Grand Prize (Daesang) for TV	Stranger	Nominated	
2018	54th Baeksang Arts Awards	Best Actor (TV)	Stranger	Won	
2018	6th APAN Star Awards	Grand Prize (Daesang)	Life	Nominated	
2018	2nd The Seoul Awards	Best Actor (Drama)	Life	Nominated	
2019	3rd Korea Musical Awards	Best Actor	Jekyll & Hyde	Nominated	
2020	4th Korea Musical Awards	Best Actor	Sweeney Todd	Nominated	
2022	6th Korea Musical Awards	Best Actor	Hedwig and the Angry Inch	Nominated	
2024	8th Korea Musical Awards	Best Actor	The Phantom of the Opera	Won	

=== State honors ===
Name of country, year given, and name of honor
Country	Ceremony	Year	Honor or Award	Ref.
South Korea	Korean Popular Culture and Arts Awards (Note: Honors are given at the Korean Popular Culture and Arts Awards, arranged by the Korea Creative Content Agency and hosted by the Ministry of Culture, Sports and Tourism. They are awarded to those who have contributed to the arts and South Korea's pop culture.)	2012	Prime Minister Commendation	
