= Divorce Attorney Shin =

2023 South Korean television series

- Promotional poster
- Hangul: 신성한, 이혼
- Hanja: 神聖한, 離婚
- Lit.: Sacred Divorce
- RR: Sinseonghan, ihon
- MR: Sinsŏnghan, ihon
- Genre: Legal drama
- Based on: Sacred Divorce by Kang Tae-kyung
- Written by: Yoo Young-ah
- Directed by: Lee Jae-hoon; Lim Jun-hyuk
- Starring: Cho Seung-woo; Han Hye-jin; Kim Sung-kyun; Jung Moon-sung
- Music by: Hwang Chan-hee; Park In-young
- Country of origin: South Korea
- Original language: Korean
- No. of episodes: 12

Production
- Executive producer: Kim Se-ah
- Producers: Jeong Hoe-seok; Jeong Yun-hong; Kim Seong-min
- Running time: 60–83 minutes
- Production companies: SLL; Hi Ground; Story Forest

Original release
- Network: JTBC
- Release: March 4 – April 9, 2023

Divorce Attorney Shin (Korean: 신성한, 이혼) is a 2023 South Korean television series starring Cho Seung-woo, Han Hye-jin, Kim Sung-kyun, and Jung Moon-sung. Based on a webtoon of the same name by Kang Tae-kyung, it aired on JTBC from March 4 to April 9, 2023, every Saturday and Sunday at 22:30 (KST) for 16 episodes. It is also available for streaming on TVING in South Korea and Netflix in selected regions.

== Synopsis ==
The series depicts the turbulent story of Shin Sung-han (Cho Seung-woo), a lawyer specializing in divorce.

== Cast ==
=== Main ===
- Cho Seung-woo as Shin Sung-han

A professor at a music college in Germany until he receives shocking news, and consequently becomes a lawyer specializing in divorce litigation.

- Han Hye-jin as Lee Seo-jin

A former weathercaster who is currently working as a radio DJ.

- Kim Sung-kyun as Jang Hyeong-geun

Sung-han's middle school friend and an office manager in Sung-han's lawyer's office.

- Jung Moon-sung as Jo Jeong-sik

CEO of Jo Jeong-sik Real Estate, who is Sung-han and Hyeong-geun's middle school friend.

=== Recurring ===
- Kang Mal-geum as Kim So-yeon

The youngest daughter of a grandmother at a ramen restaurant.

- Cha Hwa-yeon as Ma Geum-hee

Jeong-guk's mother. The hostess of Daenam Electronics.

- Jeon Bae-soo as Park Yu-seok

A partner lawyer at Geumhwa Law Firm.

- Noh Susanna as Jin Young-joo

Jeong-guk's wife.

- Han Eun-seong as Choi Jun

An intern lawyer at Geumhwa Law Firm.

- Lee Eun-jae as Yoo Sae-bom

An employee at Sung-han's lawyer office.

- Kim Tae-hyang as Seo Jeong-guk

Young-joo's husband and Ju-hwa's ex-husband. The only son of Daenam Electronics.

- Yoo Joo-hye as Bang Ho-yong

Radio PD and Seo-jin's co-worker.

- Kong Hyun-ji as Shin Ju-hwa

Sung-han's sister and Jeong-guk's ex-wife.

- Lee Ho-jae as Seo Chang-jin

Geum-hee's husband.

- Kim Joon-eui as Seo Gi-yeong

Jeong-guk and Ju-hwa's son.

- Kang Hye-won as Seo Ha-yul

Jeong-guk and Young-joo's daughter.

=== Others ===
==== Divorce case 1 ====
- Park Jung-pyo as Kang Hee-sub

Seo-jin's ex-husband.

- Jang Seon-yul as Kang Hyun-woo

Hee-sub and Seo-jin's son.

==== Divorce case 2 ====
- Hwang Jung-min as Park Ae-ran

Byeong-cheol's wife. The client who beat her mother-in-law.

- Lee Sang-goo as Seo Byeong-cheol

Ae-ran's husband.

- Heo Jin as Park Eul-boon

Byeong-cheol's mother.

- Park Se-yeong as Seo Mi-yeong

Byeong-cheol and Ae-ran's eldest daughter.

- Lee Seo-yeon as Seo Mi-so

Byeong-cheol and Ae-ran's youngest daughter.

==== Divorce case 3 ====
- Chun Joong-yong as Choi Jung-ho

Ji-yeon's husband.

- Kim Si-young as Kim Ji-sook

A hairdresser who is having an affair with Jung-ho.

- Oh Yoon-hong as Park Ji-yeon

Jung-ho's wife.

- Cha Sung-je as Choi Min-soo

Jung-ho and Ji-yeon's son.

==== Divorce case 4 ====
- Choi Jae-sub as Ma Choon-suk

Dinh Thi Hoa's husband.

- Nguyen Thi Huong as Dinh Thi Hoa

Choon-suk's wife.

==== Divorce case 5 ====
- Lee Yoon-soo as Cho Min-jung

Hyun-tae's wife.

- Im Ji-kyu as Park Hyun-tae

Min-jung's husband.

- Lee Seung-chul as Min-jung's father
- Kang Ae-sim as Min-jung's mother

==== Minor role ====
- Kim Gwang-sik as Mr.Jung (Ep. 5, 7, 12)
- Lee Soo-bin as Park Chae-rin (Ep. 2)

Sung-han's former student. A pianist.

- Oh Soon-tae as Ji-eun's boyfriend (Ep. 5)
- Min Jae-wan as a PD (Ep. 3)

=== Special appearance ===
- Ahn Dong-goo as Jung Ji-hoon (Ep. 1)

A chef who is having an affair with Seo-jin.

- Jang So-yeon as Ji-eun (Ep. 3, 5, 6)

Hyeong-geun's separated wife, who requests a divorce and is living with another man.

- Kim Hae-sook as Kim So-yeon's mother

Grandmother of the ramen restaurant.

== Viewership ==
Divorce Attorney Shin : South Korea viewers per episode (millions)

| Season | Episode number | | | | | | | | | | | | Average |
| Season | 1 | 2 | 3 | 4 | 5 | 6 | 7 | 8 | 9 | 10 | 11 | 12 | Average |
|---|---|---|---|---|---|---|---|---|---|---|---|---|---|
| 1 | 1.712 | 1.656 | 1.039 | 1.403 | 1.174 | 1.560 | 1.160 | 1.452 | 1.257 | 1.470 | 1.193 | 2.073 | 1.429 |

Source: Audience measurement performed nationwide by Nielsen Korea.

Average TV viewership ratings
| Ep. | Original broadcast date | Average audience share (Nielsen Korea) | |
| Ep. | Original broadcast date | Nationwide | Seoul |
|---|---|---|---|
| 1 | March 4, 2023 | 7.272% (1st) | 8.140% (1st) |
| 2 | March 5, 2023 | 7.317% (1st) | 7.948% (1st) |
| 3 | March 11, 2023 | 4.792% (1st) | 5.797% (1st) |
| 4 | March 12, 2023 | 6.531% (1st) | 6.959% (1st) |
| 5 | March 18, 2023 | 5.663% (1st) | 6.712% (1st) |
| 6 | March 19, 2023 | 7.520% (1st) | 8.295% (1st) |
| 7 | March 25, 2023 | 5.668% (1st) | 6.683% (1st) |
| 8 | March 26, 2023 | 6.778% (1st) | 7.560% (1st) |
| 9 | April 1, 2023 | 6.042% (1st) | 6.934% (1st) |
| 10 | April 2, 2023 | 6.929% (1st) | 8.138% (1st) |
| 11 | April 8, 2023 | 5.429% (1st) | 5.779% (1st) |
| 12 | April 9, 2023 | 9.488% (1st) | 10.539% (1st) |
| Average | | 6.619% | 7.457% |
In the table above, the blue numbers represent the lowest ratings and the red numbers represent the highest ratings.; This series aired on a cable channel/pay TV which normally has a relatively smaller audience compared to free-to-air TV/public broadcasters (KBS, SBS, MBC, and EBS).

== Accolades ==
=== Listicle ===
| Publisher | Year | Listicle | Placement | Ref. |
|---|---|---|---|---|
| Time | 2023 | The 10 Best Korean Dramas of 2023 on Netflix | Included | |
