= Designated Survivor: 60 Days =

2019 South Korean television series

- Promotional poster
- Hangul: 60일, 지정생존자
- Hanja: 60日, 指定生存者
- RR: 60il, jijeong saengjonja
- MR: 60il, chijŏng saengjonja
- Genre: Political drama; Political thriller; Crime drama
- Created by: Studio Dragon
- Based on: Designated Survivor by David Guggenheim
- Written by: Kim Tae-hee
- Directed by: Yoo Jong-sun
- Starring: Ji Jin-hee; Lee Joon-hyuk; Huh Joon-ho; Kang Han-na; Bae Jong-ok
- Music by: Lee Pil-ho; Park Jong-mi
- Country of origin: South Korea
- Original language: Korean
- No. of episodes: 16

Production
- Executive producer: Park Ho-sik
- Producer: Kim Dong-gu
- Cinematography: Kim Tae-sung; Kim Jung-wook; Lee Joon-heon
- Editor: Lee Dong-hyun
- Running time: 63–85 minutes
- Production companies: DK E&M

Original release
- Network: tvN
- Release: July 1 – August 20, 2019

Related
- Designated Survivor

Designated Survivor: 60 Days (Korean: 60일, 지정생존자) is a 2019 South Korean television series written by Kim Tae-hee, directed by Yoo Jong-sun, and starring Ji Jin-hee, Lee Joon-hyuk, Huh Joon-ho, Kang Han-na, and Bae Jong-ok. Based on the American television series Designated Survivor, this series aired on tvN from July 1 to August 20, 2019, every Monday and Tuesday at 21:30 (KST).

It is also available for streaming on Netflix in selected regions.

== Synopsis ==
Park Mu-jin (Ji Jin-hee) is the South Korean minister of environment, with little ambition as a politician. After a diplomatic incident involving free trade negotiations with the United States, President Yang Jin-ma (Kim Kap-soo) dismisses him from the office.

The next day, as the President announces to the National Assembly that he is making peace with North Korea, the building explodes, killing all of the South Korean line of succession. Park Mu-jin, whose resignation had yet to become effective, survived the accident. He is sworn in as Acting President for 60 days, and starts uncovering the truth behind the bombing.

== Cast ==
=== Main ===
- Ji Jin-hee as Park Mu-jin, Acting President of the Republic of Korea, formerly Minister of Environment and chemistry professor at KAIST. He is the show's counterpart of Tom Kirkman.
- Lee Joon-hyuk as Oh Yeong-seok, former ROK Navy Lieutenant Commander and independent member of the National Assembly. He is the show's counterpart of Congressman Peter MacLeish.
- Huh Joon-ho as Han Joo-seung, Chief Presidential Secretary later as Presidential Policy Advisor. He is arrested at the end of the series for conspiration on the bombing. He is the show's counterpart of Charles Langdon.
- Kang Han-na as Han Na-kyung, NIS Terrorism Task Force Analyst. She is the show's counterpart to Hannah Wells.
- Bae Jong-ok as Yoon Chan-kyung, leader of the opposition Seonjin Republican Party. She is the show's counterpart of Kimble Hookstratten.

=== Supporting ===
==== Park Mu-jin's Family ====
- Kim Gyu-ri as Choi Kang-yeon, First Lady of South Korea, Park Mu-jin's wife and a human rights lawyer. She is the show's counterpart of Alex Kirkman.
- Nam Woo-hyun as Park Si-wan, Park Mu-jin's teenage son. He is the show's counterpart of Leo Kirkman.
- Ok Ye-rin as Park Si-jin, Park Mu-jin's daughter. She is the show's counterpart of Penny Kirkman.

==== The Blue House ====
- Son Suk-ku as Cha Young-jin, Presidential Office Senior Administrator and appointed as Chief Presidential Secretary after Han Joo-seung resignation. He is the show's counterpart of Aaron Shore.
- Choi Yoon-young as Jung Soo-jung, secretary of Park Mu-jin. She is the show's counterpart of Emily Rhodes.
- Lee Moo-saeng as Kim Nam-wook, Presidential Office Administrator and later Acting Press Secretary, former defector from North Korea. He is the show's counterpart of Seth Wright.
- Kong Jung-hwan as Kang Dae-han, Presidential Security Service Agent. He is the show's counterpart of Mike Ritter.
- Lee Do-yeop as An Se-young, Chief of Civil Affairs.
- Baek Hyun-joo as Min Hee-kyung, Presidential Secretary.
- Park Keun-rok as Park Soo-kyo, Presidential Office Administrator.
- Park Choong-seon as Ko Young-mok, Director of the National Security Office.
- Song Yoo-hyun as Kim Eun-joo, administrator of the second subdivision office.

==== National Intelligence Service ====
- Kim Joo-hun as Jung Han-mo, NIS Terrorism Task Force Chief. He is the show's counterpart of Jason Atwood.
- Jeon Sung-woo as Seo Ji-won, NIS Terrorism Task Force Cyber Specialist. He is the show's counterpart of Chuck Russink.
- Kim Jin-geun as Ji Yoon-bae, NIS Deputy Director. He is the show's counterpart of John Forstell.
- Lee Ha-yool as Kim Jun-oh, NIS agent. He is the show's counterpart and a composite of Senator Scott Wheeler and Gabriel Thompson.

==== Republic of Korea Army ====
- Choi Jae-sung as General Lee Gwan-mook, Chairman of Joint Chiefs of Staff and Chief Director of the Joint Defense Headquarters. He is the show's counterpart of General Harris Cochrane.
- Lee Ki-young as General Eun Hee-jung, Chief of Staff of the Republic of Korea Army.

==== Presidential Candidates ====
- Ahn Nae-sang as Kang Sang-goo, former three term Mayor of Seoul. He is the show's counterpart to and a composite of Governor James Royce and former president Cornelius Moss.

==== TBN Station ====
- Choi Jin-ho as Kim Dan, the news director.
- Oh Hye-won as Woo Sin-young, journalist. She is the show's counterpart to and a composite of Elizabeth Vargas, Lisa Jordan, and Abe Leonard.

==== Others ====
- Jeon Su-ji as Heo Jin-joo

=== Special appearances ===
- Kim Kap-soo as Yang Jin-man, the assassinated President of the Republic of Korea (episode 1). He is the show's counterpart of President Robert Richmond.
- Park Hoon as Major Jang Jun Ha (episode 6). He is the show's counterpart of Captain Max Clarkson.

== Original soundtrack ==
Designated Survivor: 60 Days OST

Soundtrack album by Various artists
- Released: 2019
- Genre: Soundtrack
- Languages: Korean; English
- Labels: Genie Music; Stone Music Entertainment

=== Part 1 ===
Released on July 9, 2019
No.	Title	Lyrics	Music	Artist	Length
1.	"My Hope"	Cha Yeoul	FreeLeo	Cha Yeoul	3:43
2.	"My Hope" (Inst.)		FreeLeo		3:43
Total length:					7:26

=== Part 2 ===
Released on July 23, 2019
No.	Title	Lyrics	Music	Artist	Length
1.	"Tomorrow"	Tae Bong-i; Han Rim	Tae Bong-i; Sung Hyun-taek	Gonne Choi	4:12
2.	"Tomorrow" (Inst.)		Tae Bong-i; Sung Hyun-taek		4:12
Total length:					8:24

=== Part 3 ===
Released on August 6, 2019
No.	Title	Lyrics	Music	Artist	Length
1.	"Faith"	12wol32il; Tae Bong-i; Sung Hyun-taek	Tae Bong-i; Sung Hyun-taek	Nine9	3:10
2.	"Faith" (Inst.)		Tae Bong-i; Sung Hyun-taek		3:10
Total length:					6:20

== Viewership ==
Designated Survivor: 60 Days : South Korea viewers per episode (thousands)

Season	Episode number																Average
Season	1	2	3	4	5	6	7	8	9	10	11	12	13	14	15	16	Average
1	825	959	1065	958	1012	806	907	942	917	1029	1110	1126	1090	1145	1217	1367	1030

Source: Audience measurement performed nationwide by Nielsen Media Research.

Average TV viewership ratings
Ep.	Original broadcast date	Title	Average audience share (AGB Nielsen)	
Ep.	Original broadcast date	Title	Nationwide	Seoul
1	July 1, 2019	Day 60: The Acting President	3.383%	3.974%
2	July 2, 2019	Day 60: Commander-In-Chief	4.157%	4.446%
3	July 8, 2019	Day 59: Maintaining Status Quo	4.336%	4.436%
4	July 9, 2019	Day 58: Confession	4.155%	4.330%
5	July 15, 2019	Day 57: A Good Person	4.277%	4.832%
6	July 16, 2019	Day 52: Command	3.843%	4.118%
7	July 22, 2019	Day 49: Governance	4.057%	4.326%
8	July 23, 2019	Day 42: Doubt	4.172%	4.433%
9	July 29, 2019	Day 41: Scandal	4.031%	4.387%
10	July 30, 2019	Day 40: Accomplice	4.421%	4.576%
11	August 5, 2019	Day 39: The Acting President, Oh Yeong-seok	4.488%	5.034%
12	August 6, 2019	Day 37: Answer	4.771%	5.205%
13	August 12, 2019	Day 35: Presidential Candidate	4.778%	4.875%
14	August 13, 2019	Day 34: The Outcome	4.948%	5.484%
15	August 19, 2019	Day 32: The Trap	5.434%	6.067%
16	August 20, 2019	Day 31: The Last Choice	6.178%	7.181%
Average			4.464%	4.857%
In the table above, the blue numbers represent the lowest ratings and the red numbers represent the highest ratings.; This drama aired on a cable channel/pay TV which normally has a relatively smaller audience compared to free-to-air TV/public broadcasters (KBS, SBS, MBC and EBS).

== Awards and nominations ==
Year	Award	Category	Recipient	Result	Ref.
2019	12th Korea Drama Awards	Excellence Award, Actor	Lee Joon-hyuk	Nominated	
2019	Asian Academy Creative Awards	Best Adaptation of an Existing Format	Designated Survivor: 60 Days	Won	
