= Low Life (2004 film) =

- Poster to Low Life (2004)
- Hangul: 하류인생
- Hanja: 下流人生
- RR: Haryuinsaeng
- MR: Haryuinsaeng
- Directed by: Im Kwon-taek
- Written by: Im Kwon-taek
- Produced by: Lee Tae-won
- Starring: Cho Seung-woo; Kim Gyu-ri
- Cinematography: Jung Il-sung
- Edited by: Park Soon-duk
- Music by: Shin Joong-hyun
- Distributed by: Cinema Service
- Release date: May 21, 2004 (South Korea)
- Running time: 105 minutes
- Country: South Korea
- Language: Korean

Low Life (Korean: 하류인생; RR: Haryuinsaeng; also known as Raging Years) is a 2004 South Korean neo-noir action film directed by Im Kwon-taek, starring Cho Seung-woo and Kim Gyu-ri.

== Plot ==
The life of gangster Choi Tae-woong is followed through the tumultuous events of the second half of the 20th century in Korea.

== Cast ==
- Cho Seung-woo as Choi Tae-woong
- Kim Gyu-ri as Park Hye-ok
- Moon Jeong-hee as Hong Su-bi
- Kim Hak-jun as Oh Sang-pil
- Yoo Ha-jun as Park Seung-mun
- Kim Young-hoon
- Tae In-ho as Ddeok Dae's friend.
- Kim Jung-tae as Supplier #1.

== Film festivals ==
It was invited to the 2004 Toronto International Film Festival, and screened in competition at the Hawaii International Film Festival and the 2004 Venice Film Festival.

== Awards and nominations ==
Year	Award	Category	Recipients	Result
2004	61st Venice International Film Festival	Golden Lion	Im Kwon-taek	Nominated
2004	Hawaii International Film Festival	Narrative Feature	Low Life	Nominated

== Sources ==
- Bocchi, Pier Maria (November 2004), "Haryu Insaeng (Review)", Cineforum (in Italian), pp. 63–64
- Elley, Derek (2004-09-13), "Film reviews", Variety, p. 47
- "Haryu Insaeng (Review)", Venice Film Festival Catalogue (in Italian), vol. 61, pp. 60–61, September 2004
- "Im Kwon-taek's Retrospective". www.koreafilmfest.com. 2007.
- Marshall, Lee (2004-11-19), "Low Life (Haryu Insaeng)", Screen International, p. 30
