= Jeong Yoon-cheol =

South Korean film director (born 1971)

- 정윤철
- Born: 14 May 1971 (age 55); Seoul, South Korea
- Education: School of Film and Theater at Hanyang University
- Years active: 1999–present

Korean name
- Hangul: 정윤철
- Hanja: 鄭胤澈
- RR: Jeong Yuncheol
- MR: Chŏng Yunch'ŏl

Jeong Yoon-cheol (Korean: 정윤철; born May 14, 1971) is a South Korean film director. He is known for directing the films Marathon (2005) and A Man Who Was Superman (2008).

== Career ==
Jeong graduated from School of Film and Theater at Hanyang University. After his successful directorial debut with short film Memorial Picture, he was selected as a member of MAMPIST and studied film editing at the Australian Film Television and Radio School. His short film Hibernation was invited to the Clermont-Ferrand Film Festival in 1999 and won Best Director Award at the Shinyoung Film Festival.

In 2005 his heart-warming feature debut Marathon about an autistic athlete was a huge hit in Korea. His next movie was the comedy Shim's Family.

== Filmography as director ==
- Marathon (2005)
- Skeletons in the Closet (2007)
- A Man Who Was Superman (2008)
- Warriors of the Dawn (2017)
- Sea Tiger (2025)

== Accolades ==
Year	Award	Category	Recipients	Result	Ref.
1997	4th Seoul Short Film Festival	Best Film Award	Memorial Picture	Won	
2000	Shinyoung Film Festival	Best Director Award	Hibernation	Won	
2005	41st Baeksang Arts Awards	Grand Prize (Daesang)	Marathon	Won	
2005	41st Baeksang Arts Awards	Best Film	Marathon	Nominated	
2005	41st Baeksang Arts Awards	Best Screenplay	Marathon	Won	
2005	41st Baeksang Arts Awards	Best New Director	Marathon	Nominated	
2005	13th Chunsa Film Art Awards	Best New Director	Marathon	Won	
2005	42nd Grand Bell Awards	Best Film	Marathon	Won	
2005	42nd Grand Bell Awards	Best New Director	Marathon	Won	
2005	42nd Grand Bell Awards	Best Screenplay	Marathon	Won	
2005	26th Blue Dragon Film Awards	Best Film	Marathon	Nominated	
2005	26th Blue Dragon Film Awards	Best New Director	Marathon	Won	
2005	26th Blue Dragon Film Awards	Best Screenplay	Marathon	Nominated	
2005	4th Korean Film Awards	Best Film	Marathon	Nominated	
2005	4th Korean Film Awards	Best Screenplay	Marathon	Nominated	
2005	4th Korean Film Awards	Best New Director	Marathon	Nominated	
2005	8th Director's Cut Awards	Best New Director	Marathon	Won	
2005	Korea Disabled People Human's Rights Award	Culture and Arts	Marathon	Won	
2005	The 25th Korean Film Critics Association Awards	Top 10 Film Awards	Marathon	Won	
2005	28th Golden Cinematography Awards	New Director Award	Marathon	Won	
2005	The 15th Korea Catholic Media Awards	Film	Marathon	Won	
2006	Today's Young Artist Awards	Film	Marathon	Won	
