= Joo Min-kyung =

South Korean actress (born 1989)

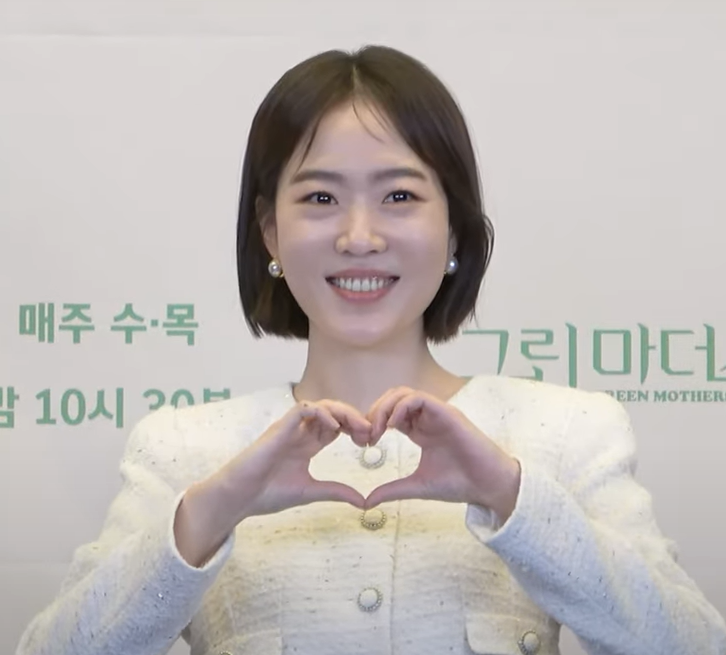
- Joo in April 2022
- Born: July 6, 1989 (age 36); South Korea
- Other names: Ju Min-gyung
- Occupation: Actress
- Years active: 2014–present
- Agent: Story J Company

Korean name
- Hangul: 주민경
- RR: Ju Mingyeong
- MR: Chu Min'gyŏng
- Website: storyjcompany.com

Joo Min-kyung (Korean: 주민경; born July 6, 1989) is a South Korean actress. She is known for her roles in television series such as Something in the Rain (2018), Sketch (2018), One Spring Night (2019), Soul Mechanic (2020), Jirisan (2021), Green Mothers' Club (2022) and Behind Your Touch (2023).

== Filmography ==
=== Television series ===
Year	Title	Role	Ref.
2014	Steal Heart	Jin-mi	
2015	Heard It Through the Grapevine	Noo-ri's colleague	
2015	This Is My Love	Nan-shil	
2018	Something in the Rain	Geum Bo-ra	
2018	Sketch	Lee Soo-young	
2019	One Spring Night	Lee Jae-in	
2019	KBS Drama Special: "Understanding of Electric Shock"	Ko Nam-young	
2020	Soul Mechanic	Gong Ji-sun	
2021	Jirisan	Lee Yang-sun	
2021	Dr. Brain	Doctor	
2022	Green Mothers' Club	Park Yoon-joo	
2023	Behind Your Touch	Ok-hee	
2024	No Gain No Love	Cha Hui-seung	
2024	Spice Up Our Love	Cha Hee-seong	
2024	The Trunk	Kang Yoon-ah	

=== Film ===
Year	Title	Korean Title	Role	Ref.
2014	Mind Ahead	앞서는 마음	House owner's daughter	
2014	Sans Retour	산스 리턴	Min-kyung	
2015	Apocalypse	종말	Ju in-gyeong	
2017	Knot	매듭	Ju-min	
2017	America Dream	아메리카 드림	Ju-gyung	
2019	The Most Ordinary Romance	가장 보통의 연애	Joo-hee	

== Awards and nominations ==
Name of the award ceremony, year presented, category, nominee of the award, and the result of the nomination
Award ceremony	Year	Category	Nominee / Work	Result	Ref.
Baeksang Arts Awards	2024	Best Supporting Actress – Television	Behind Your Touch	Nominated	
