= Lee Ki-young =

South Korean actor (born 1963)

- Born: August 26, 1963 (age 63); Seoul, South Korea
- Education: Seoul Institute of the Arts - Theater
- Occupation: Actor
- Years active: 1984–present
- Family: Lee Hyo-jung (brother); Lee Yoo-jin (nephew)

Korean name
- Hangul: 이기영
- Hanja: 李基永
- RR: I Giyeong
- MR: I Kiyŏng

Lee Ki-young (born August 26, 1963) is a South Korean actor. His notable roles include Marathon (2005), A Bittersweet Life (2005), and Love Me Not (2006).

== Filmography ==
=== Film ===
- Night in Paradise (2020)
- The Witch: Part 1. The Subversion (2018)
- How to Steal a Dog (2014)
- The Plan (2014)
- Circle of Crime (2012)
- Once Upon a Time in Seoul (2008)
- BA:BO (2008)
- Beautiful Sunday (2007)
- Soo (2007)
- Love Me Not (2006)
- My Captain Mr. Underground (2006)
- A Bittersweet Life (2005)
- Marathon (2005)
- Natural City (2003)
- Birth of a Man (2002)
- Marrying the Mafia (2002)
- The Beauty in Dream (2002)
- The Last Witness (2001)
- The Foul King (2000)
- Picture Diary (2000)
- The Soul Guardians (1998)
- Bedroom and Courtroom (1998)
- The Quiet Family (1998)
- Beat (1997)
- Mr. Condom (1997)
- The Gate of Destiny (1996)
- The Terrorist (1995)
- 48 + 1 (1995)
- How to Top My Wife (1994)
- The Man Who Cannot Kiss (1994)
- The Fox with Nine Tails (1994)
- Two Cops (1993)
- I Will Survive (1993)
- Hong Do, a Kid Clown (1992)
- I Want to Live Just Until 20 Years Old (1992)
- Silver Stallion (1991)
- Fly High Run Far (1991)
- Teenage Love Song (1991)
- Who Saw the Dragon's Toenails? (1991)
- Mayumi (1990)
- Country of Fire (1989)
- Sand Castle (1989)
- The World of Women (1988)
- Prostitution (1988)
- Diary of King Yeonsan (1987)
- Lee Jang-ho's Baseball Team (1986)

=== Television series ===
- Brewing Love (2024)
- Payback: Money and Power (2023)
- Big Mouth (2022)
- Extraordinary Attorney Woo (2022)
- Business Proposal (2022)
- Move to Heaven (2021)
- Happiness (2021)
- Vagabond (2019)
- Designated Survivor: 60 Days (2019)
- The Fiery Priest (2019)
- Wok of Love (2018)
- Grand Prince (2018)
- While You Were Sleeping (2017)
- The King in Love (2017)
- The Emperor: Owner of the Mask (2017)
- Mrs. Cop (2015)
- The Man in the Mask (2015)
- Life Tracker Lee Jae-goo (2015)
- Punch (2014)
- The King's Face (2014)
- You're All Surrounded (2014)
- The King's Daughter, Soo Baek-hyang (2013)
- The Queen's Classroom (2013)
- A Tale of Two Sisters (2013)
- Incarnation of Money (2013)
- Golden Time (2012)
- Phantom (2012)
- History of a Salaryman (2012)
- Glory Jane (2011)
- Royal Family (2011)
- The Duo (2011)
- Ang Shim Jung (2010)
- Giant (2010)
- OB & GY (2010)
- Dream (2009)
- Tazza (2008)
- Gourmet (2008)
- Tokyo Sun Shower (2008)
- New Heart (2007)
- Time Between Dog and Wolf (2007)
- Prince Hours (2007)
- Lovers (2006)
- Common Single (2006)
- One Fine Day (2006)
- Golden Apple (2005)
- Chosun Police (2005)
- 5th Republic (2005)
- Super Rookie (2005)
- First Love of a Royal Prince (2004)
- MBC Best Theater – "Hi, Clementine" (2004)
- Garden of Eve (2003)
- Drama City – "Mousetrap" (2003)
- Thousand Years of Love (2003)
- Glass Slippers (2002)
- The Clinic for Married Couples: Love and War (1999)
- White Nights 3.98 (1998)
- Im Kkeok-jeong (1996)
- Shooting (1996)
- Basics of Dating (1995)
- What is Fate? (1995)
- Faraway Songba River (1993)
- 500 Years of Joseon – "The Memoirs of Lady Hyegyeong" (1988–1989)
- Human Market (1988)

== Theater ==
- King Lear (1984)

== Acting nominations ==
- Nominated, 2005 4th Korean Film Awards: Best Supporting Actor (Marathon)
- Nominated, 2005 42nd Grand Bell Awards: Best Supporting Actor (Marathon)
