= Radio Dayz =

- Hangul: 라듸오 데이즈
- RR: Raduio deijeu
- MR: Radio teijŭ
- Directed by: Ha Ki-ho
- Written by: Kim Hyoun-jung; Shin Jung-joo; Ha Ki-Ho
- Produced by: Cha Seung-jae; Kim Mi-hee
- Starring: Kim Sa-rang; Ryoo Seung-bum; Lee Jong-hyuk
- Cinematography: Lee Tae-yun
- Music by: Sung Ki-wan
- Production company: Sidus Pictures
- Distributed by: Sidus Pictures
- Release date: January 31, 2008
- Running time: 111 minutes
- Country: South Korea
- Language: Korean

Radio Dayz (Korean: 라듸오 데이즈; RR: Raduio deijeu) is a 2008 South Korean romantic comedy film written and directed by Ha Ki-ho.

== Cast ==
- Kim Sa-rang as radio announcer and jazz singer, Mari
- Ryoo Seung-bum as Producer Lloyd
- Lee Jong-hyuk as K
- Hwang Bo-ra as Myung-wol
- Oh Jung-se as Man-chul
- Kim Roi-ha as Mr. Noh
- Ko Ah-sung as Sun-deok
- Moon Se-yun as political party member 3

== Additional cast members ==
- Kim Kwang-sik as political party member 1
- Park Jung-pyo as political party member 2
- Ko Beun-jin as radio listener
- Kim Byung-man as truck driver
- Ahn Sang-tae as postal employee
- Kwon Oh-min as delivery boy
- Jung Young-ki as Japanese soldier #3
- Kim Young-pil as writer
- Kim Sa-hee as Hong-Joo
- Jeon Su-ji as Madame Kakadyu
