= Green Mothers' Club =

2022 South Korean television series

- Promotional poster
- Hangul: 그린마더스클럽
- RR: Geurin madeoseu keulleop
- MR: Kŭrin madŏsŭ k'ŭllŏp
- Genre: Drama; Friendship
- Created by: JTBC
- Written by: Shin Yi-won
- Directed by: Ra Ha-na
- Starring: Lee Yo-won; Choo Ja-hyun; Kim Gyu-ri; Jang Hye-jin; Joo Min-kyung
- Country of origin: South Korea
- Original language: Korean
- No. of episodes: 16

Production
- Production companies: SLL; Megaphone

Original release
- Network: JTBC
- Release: April 6 – May 26, 2022

Green Mothers' Club (Korean: 그린마더스클럽) is a 2022 South Korean television series directed by Ra Ha-na and starring Lee Yo-won, Choo Ja-hyun, Kim Gyu-ri, Jang Hye-jin and Joo Min-kyung. It premiered on JTBC on April 6, 2022, and aired every Wednesday and Thursday at 22:30 (KST) with 16 episodes. It is also available for streaming on Netflix.

== Synopsis ==
A story depicting the friendships, motherly love, and growth of 5 mothers who met in the elementary community, each with a complex that they could not overcome.

== Cast ==
=== Main ===
- Lee Yo-won as Lee Eun-pyo

A highly educated mother from French studies who majored in aesthetics first, moves into their community and gets involved in all sorts of incidents.

- Choo Ja-hyun as Byeon Chun-Hui

The most powerful mother of popular in terms of beauty and information content.

- Kim Gyu-ri as Seo Jin-ha

A woman who has a handsome foreign husband with an innate elegance and a gifted son, creates a strange atmosphere as Eun-pyo's rival and best friend.

- Jang Hye-jin as Kim Young-mi

A mother who values emotional connection with her child. "We must be in solidarity with a wise mother.

- Joo Min-kyung as Park Yun-joo

Eun-pyo's cousin is a scoundrel who does nothing for education, creating other tangled stories.

=== Supporting ===
==== Eun-pyo's family ====
- Choi Jae-rim as Jung Jae-woong

Eun-pyo's husband, a police detective. Looks bland but sharp. He has a knack of reading women's minds. He is unassuming and straightforward.

- Jung Chi-yul as Jung Dong-seok

Eun-pyo and Jae-woong's son, Eun-pyo just thinks Dong-seok is a talkative and curious child. Because he was busy with school and had never met another mother in kindergarten, he Neglecting to compare and understand the status of the same person.

- Lee Chae-hyun as Jung Dong-joo

The second son of Eun-pyo and Jae-woong's son.

==== Chun-hee's family ====
- Choi Deok-moon as Kim Joo-seok

An anesthesiologist and Chun-hee's husband. He had the arrogance to see everyone under his feet.

- Kim Seo-joon as Kim Young-bin

Chun-hee and Joo-seok's son.

- Joo Ye-rim as Kim Yu-bin

The daughter of Chun-hee and Joo-seok, A young woman who is smart, lively and emotionally honest. If you didn't get into the high class, even if your mom wouldn't tell you to do it. You simply cannot stand by yourself.

==== Jin-ha's family ====
- Choi Gwang-rok as Louis Bunuel / Louis

Eun-pyo's ex-boyfriend and Jin-ha's current husband. He betrayed Eun-pyo and fell for Jin-ha. He is a French citizen of Korean descent which is Jin-ha's husband and currently works at the pharmaceutical company GM.

- Shin Seo-woo as Henry Bunuel

The son of Jin-ha and Louis, Characteristics that cannot be considered Earthling, plus a language genius who speaks five languages.

==== Young-mi's Family ====
- Im Soo-hyung as Oh Geon-woo

Young-mi's husband and famous as a genius film director.

- Ahn Seok-hyun as Chulpin

Son of Young-mi and Geon-woo, Children living with stepfather Geon-woo as their mother remarried. Chulpin is playful, can't stay still and stir.

- Jeon Yu-na as Saebeom

Young-mi and Geon-woo's daughters. Children living with stepfather Geon-woo as their mother remarried. Saebeom, who has just entered puberty. Afraid of her stepfather's fury and sensitivity. and resenting her assertive mother in pursuing only her ideals.

==== Yun-joo's family ====
- Yoon Kyung-ho as Lee Man-su

Yun-joo's husband, a timid and passive office worker, is the only stigmatized person to watch TV with a beer after work

- Park Ye-rin as Lee Soo-in

Yun-joo's daughter, An 8-year-old elementary school student who grew up a little faster.

==== Others ====
- Lee Ji-hyun as Jeong-suk

A teacher at an elementary school located in Sangsu-dong with a fierce passion for education.

- Lee Seon-hee as Bang Jeong-hee

Someone who has both the wealth and power of the aristocracy. A mother who supports her child's education immensely. and is the chairman of the University Foundation

- Joo In-young as Jae-bin's mother

She is friends with Yun-joo and Chun-hee.

- Jeon Su-ji as Min-ji's mother

She is friends with Chun-hee and Yun-joo. She likes to listen to gossip and rumors.

- Sung Byung-suk as Hyung-im

A strong mother who raised Eun-pyo with the utmost sincerity while working at the paint shop. Even so, he often felt sorry for his daughter Eun-pyo. which made Eun-pyo upset.

- Park Jin-ah as Park Yoo-jin

Science teacher in a gifted school where children attend.

- Na Hyun-woo as Jang Won-tae

His unusual relationship with Chun-hee.

- Lee Soo-mi as Bakery employee
- Shim So-young as Housekeeper Nam.
- Kim Do-yeon as Soo-in's aunt
- Oh Hee-joon as Detective Dong-shik

== Production ==
On May 26, 2021, it was confirmed that Lee Yo-won and Choo Ja-hyun would make a comeback with TV series Green Mothers' Club, directed by Ra Ha-na, written by Shin Yi-won, and produced by JTBC Studio. It is scheduled to be broadcast on JTBC in 2022, and the schedule is under discussion. The cast lineup was confirmed on July 2, 2021.

== Original soundtrack ==
=== Part 1 ===
Released on April 14, 2022
No.	Title	Lyrics	Music	Artist	Length
1.	"Happiness"	Hen	Jayins; Naiv	Naakyeum	3:01
2.	"Happiness" (Inst.)		Jayins; Naiv		3:01
Total length:					6:02

=== Part 2 ===
Released on April 21, 2022
No.	Title	Lyrics	Music	Artist	Length
1.	"Moonlight Mother"	Cho Dong-hee	Hong Dae-sung; Jayins	Jang Pil-soon	2:55
2.	"Moonlight Mother" (Inst.)		Hong Dae-sung; Jayins		2:55
Total length:					5:50

=== Part 3 ===
Released on April 28, 2022
No.	Title	Lyrics	Music	Artist	Length
1.	"What If"	Jayins	Jayins; Naiv	Jung-in	3:18
2.	"What If" (Inst.)		Jayins; Naiv		3:18
Total length:					6:36

=== Part 4 ===
Released on May 4, 2022
No.	Title	Lyrics	Music	Artist	Length
1.	"IVORY"	Jemma	Naiv	Jemma	2:47
2.	"IVORY" (Inst.)		Naiv		2:47
Total length:					5:34

== Viewership ==
Green Mothers' Club : South Korea viewers per episode (thousands)

Season	Episode number																Average
Season	1	2	3	4	5	6	7	8	9	10	11	12	13	14	15	16	Average
1	562	610	594	854	604	816	638	909	795	953	835	922	807	951	932	1299	818

Source: Audience measurement performed nationwide by Nielsen Korea

Average TV viewership ratings
Ep.	Original broadcast date	Average audience share	
Ep.	Original broadcast date	Nationwide	Seoul
1	April 6, 2022	2.519% (13th)	2.967% (7th)
2	April 7, 2022	2.991% (11th)	3.456% (6th)
3	April 13, 2022	2.52% (17th)	—N/a
4	April 14, 2022	3.616% (8th)	3.964% (4th)
5	April 20, 2022	2.544% (10th)	2.815% (7th)
6	April 21, 2022	3.671% (5th)	4.026% (3rd)
7	April 27, 2022	2.802% (4th)	2.708% (4th)
8	April 28, 2022	4.302% (5th)	4.436% (3rd)
9	May 4, 2022	3.374% (4th)	3.204% (5th)
10	May 5, 2022	4.539% (4th)	5.065% (2nd)
11	May 11, 2022	4.175% (3rd)	4.714% (1st)
12	May 12, 2022	4.406% (3rd)	3.992% (3rd)
13	May 18, 2022	3.593% (4th)	3.777% (2nd)
14	May 19, 2022	4.617% (3rd)	4.411% (2nd)
15	May 25, 2022	4.192% (2nd)	4.290% (2nd)
16	May 26, 2022	6.088% (1st)	6.154% (1st)
Average		3.747%	—
In the table above, the blue numbers represent the lowest ratings and the red numbers represent the highest ratings.; This drama airs on a cable channel/pay TV which normally has a relatively smaller audience compared to free-to-air TV/public broadcasters (KBS, SBS, MBC and EBS).
