= A Man Who Was Superman =

- Theatrical release poster
- Hangul: 슈퍼맨이었던 사나이
- RR: Syupeomaenieotdeon sanai
- MR: Syup'ŏmaeniŏttŏn sanai
- Directed by: Jeong Yoon-cheol
- Written by: Kim Ba-da; Joon Jin-ho; Jeong Yoon-cheol
- Produced by: Yoo Il-han
- Starring: Hwang Jung-min; Jun Ji-hyun
- Cinematography: Choi Young-hwan
- Edited by: Kim Yang-il
- Music by: Kim Hyeon-bo; Lee Han-na
- Distributed by: CJ Entertainment
- Release date: January 31, 2008
- Running time: 102 minutes
- Country: South Korea
- Language: Korean
- Box office: US$3.9 million

A Man Who Was Superman (Korean: 슈퍼맨이었던 사나이; RR: Syupeomaenieotdeon sanai) is a 2008 South Korean comedy-drama film directed by Jeong Yoon-cheol, starring Hwang Jung-min and Jun Ji-hyun. The film applies techniques of magical realism to problems arising from the narcissism of small differences that plagues the modern Korean conscience.

== Plot ==
Song Soo-jung is a producer going on her third year at a small company. Her speciality is filming human interest stories. She is driven to produce these shallow stories for the sake of her ambition of one day becoming Korea's own Oprah Winfrey. However, she is reaching the end of what's left of her pride. After months of not getting paid, one day she leaves her office as usual with the company camera to produce a story on a lion apparently refusing to eat its meal. On her way, however, she comes across a robber, but she is saved somehow by "Superman" in a Hawaiian shirt.

Superman claims he's unable to tap into his superhuman powers because "bad guys" have placed kryptonite inside his head. However, he doesn't let that get in his way of helping others, and saving the world from global warming and rescuing a lost puppy. Soo-jung follows him around as he attempts to help the community in his bizarre fashion, seeing this will make a good story. With a little tweaking and fabricating, she produces the "Superman Saves the World" documentary which goes on to be a ratings hit. With his "super-deeds" Lee inspires hope within the community and people begin to follow his example.

However, after an X-Ray examination of "Superman's" skull, it becomes clear that there really is something stuck in his head - a bullet. A flashback shows that when Lee was a boy, he saw Superman with his father, who told him that if he counted to one-hundred, he would become Superman. Caught in a skirmish during the Gwangju Democratization Movement, Lee's father is killed, and the young Lee is shot in the back of the head. Miraculously, he lived with the bullet still lodged in his skull.

Years later, Lee, his wife, and daughter were in a car accident. His wife died instantly, but his daughter survived. In the burning wreckage, Lee told his daughter if she counted to one hundred, he'd turn into Superman to save her. Unfortunately, just as he was running to the car with a fire extinguisher, the bullet in his head caused a seizure, causing him to collapse on the road. As he writhed on the ground in pain, the car exploded with his daughter still inside. None of the onlookers in the crowd attempted to help Lee, nor his daughter. It was at this moment when mental trauma caused Lee to believe he was Superman.

Returning back to the present day, Lee loses all hope in attempting to rescue a police officer from underneath a burning car. It's at this moment that people inspired by the documentary help Lee in trying to rescue the police officer. But when Lee attempts to save a child from a burning building, he ends up going in alone. In the collapsing building, Lee couldn't find a way to escape, so he ends up jumping out of a window with the child, landing on his head. From there he flies and goes back in time to save himself from the bullet that hits Lee in his childhood (although that was just a dream).

In actuality, he died due to landing on his head while saving the child. No one in the crowd helped as they just looked on, though in the hospital there appeared to be an "S" on his chest when they were about to take an organ from him. Soo-jung is inspired by Lee's sacrifice and follows his example by helping an old woman. From then on, Soo-jung remembers a phrase used by Lee Hyun-Suk when they first met - "Strength doesn't open big iron doors but a small key"- which helps the frosty, calculating Soo-jung to awaken to what's truly important in life.

== Cast ==
- Hwang Jung-min as Lee Hyun-suk
- Jun Ji-hyun as Song Soo-jung
- Jeon Su-ji as Parking lot woman

== Release ==
A Man Who Was Superman was released in South Korea on 31 January 2008, and on its opening weekend was ranked fourth at the box office with 206,858 admissions. As of 31 March 2008 it had received a total of 559,867 admissions, and as of 17 February 2008 had grossed at total of $3,848,034.
