= 42nd Grand Bell Awards =

2005 edition of award ceremony

- Official poster
- Date: July 8, 2005
- Site: Sejong Center for the Performing Arts, Seoul

The 42nd Grand Bell Awards ceremony was held at the Sejong Center for the Performing Arts in Seoul on July 8, 2005.

== Nominations and winners ==
(Winners denoted in bold)

Best Film	Best Director
**Marathon**; A Bittersweet Life; Blood Rain; Crying Fist; Rikidōzan	**Song Hae-sung** - **Rikidōzan**; Kim Dae-seung - Blood Rain; Kim Jee-woon - A Bittersweet Life; Park Heung-sik - My Mother, the Mermaid; Ryoo Seung-wan - Crying Fist
Best Actor	Best Actress
**Cho Seung-woo** - **Marathon**; Lee Byung-hun - A Bittersweet Life; Ryoo Seung-bum - Crying Fist; Sul Kyung-gu - Another Public Enemy; Sul Kyung-gu - Rikidōzan	**Kim Hye-soo** - **Hypnotized**; Jeon Do-yeon - My Mother, the Mermaid; Kim Mi-sook - Marathon; Lee Eun-ju - The Scarlet Letter; Moon Geun-young - Innocent Steps
Best Supporting Actor	Best Supporting Actress
**Hwang Jung-min** - **A Bittersweet Life**; Kang Shin-il - Another Public Enemy; Lee Ki-young - Marathon; Lee Moon-sik - Hi! Dharma 2: Showdown in Seoul; Park Yong-woo - Blood Rain	**Na Moon-hee** - **Crying Fist**; Go Doo-shim - My Mother, the Mermaid; Jo Mi-ryung - Love in Magic; Kim Soo-mi - Mr. Gam's Victory; Shin Yi - My Boyfriend Is Type B
Best New Actor	Best New Actress
**Go Soo** - **Some**; Jo Han-sun - Temptation of Wolves; Lee Dong-gun - My Boyfriend Is Type B; Park Gun-hyung - Innocent Steps; Park Ji-bin - Hello Brother	**Lee Chung-ah** - **Temptation of Wolves**; Han Ji-hye - My Boyfriend Is Type B; Jang Seo-hee - Ghost House; Kim Ji-soo - This Charming Girl; Soo Ae - A Family
Best New Director	Best Planning
**Jeong Yoon-cheol** - **Marathon**; Choo Chang-min - Mapado; Kong Su-chang - R-Point; Lee Yoon-ki - This Charming Girl; Yim Pil-sung - Antarctic Journal	**Seok Myeong-hong** - **Marathon**; Cha Seung-jae - Rikidōzan; Im Seung-yong, Park Jae-hyeong - Crying Fist; Kim Mi-hee - Blood Rain; Shim Jae-myung, Shin Chul - The President's Last Bang
Best Original Screenplay	Best Adapted Screenplay
**Jeong Yoon-cheol, Song Ye-jin, Yoon Jin-ho** - **Marathon**; Jeon Cheol-hong, Ryoo Seung-wan - Crying Fist; Kim Hee-jae - Another Public Enemy; Lee Won-jae - Blood Rain; Song Hye-jin, Park Heung-sik - My Mother, the Mermaid	**Kim Young-ha** - **A Moment to Remember**; Jang Min-seok - The President's Barber; Kim Dae-jin, Oh Sang-hoon - Cracked Eggs and Noodles; Kim Hee-jae - Everybody Has Secrets; Yang Yun-ho - Fighter in the Wind
Best Cinematography	Best Editing
**Kim Hyung-koo** - **Rikidōzan**; Choi Young-hwan - Blood Rain; Jo Yong-gyu - Crying Fist; Kim Ji-yong - A Bittersweet Life; Kim Woo-hyung - Hypnotized	**Nam Na-yeong** - **Crying Fist**; Choi Jae-keun - A Bittersweet Life; Kim Sang-bum, Kim Jae-bum - Blood Rain; Lee Eun-soo - Hypnotized; Park Gok-ji - Rikidōzan
Best Art Direction	Best Lighting
**Min Eon-ok** - **Blood Rain**; Hisao Inagaki - Rikidōzan; Kim Ji-soo - The Scarlet Letter; Ryu Seong-hui - A Bittersweet Life; Yoon Joo-hoon - Hypnotized	**Im Jae-young** - **Hypnotized**; Jeong Seong-cheol - Crying Fist; Kim Sung-kwan - Blood Rain; Lee Kang-san - Rikidōzan; Shin Sang-ryeol - A Bittersweet Life
Best Costume Design	Best Music
**Jung Kyung-hee** - **Blood Rain**; Jo Sang-gyeong - Hypnotized; Jo Yun-mi - The Scarlet Letter; Jung Wook-jun, Lee Ji-young, Junko Katsumata - Rikidōzan; Lee Ji-young - Innocent Steps	**Kim Jun-seong** - **Marathon**; Bang Jun-seok - Crying Fist; Jang Young-gyu - Hypnotized; Jang Young-gyu, Dalpalan - A Bittersweet Life; Lee Hoon-seok - Temptation of Wolves
Best Visual Effects	Best Sound Effects
**Jung Deok-young (B.BOX), Yoon Yeo-jin (KMFX)** - **Hypnotized**; Han Tae-jeong (Insight Visual), Jeong Do-an (Demolition), Shin Jae-ho (Mage) - Blood Rain; Kim Wook (DTI), Kwak Tae-yong (CELL), Demolition - A Bittersweet Life; Lee Jeon-hyeong (EON), Shin Joo-hee, Jang Jong-gyu, Jo Sung-jae, Jeong Do-an (Demolition) - Crying Fist; MoFac Studio, Lee Jin-young, Hong Jang-pyo (Effect Storm) - Rikidōzan	**Kang Joo-seok, Lead Sound** - **R-Point**; Jeong Gun, Kim Suk-won (Blue Cap) - Crying Fist; Kim Kyung-tae, Choi Tae-young (Live Zone) - A Bittersweet Life; Kim Young-mun (Live), Choi Tae-young (Live Zone) - Antarctic Journal; Lee Seung-chul, Korean Film Council - Hypnotized
Popularity Award	Special Jury Prize
**Cho Seung-woo** - **Marathon**; **Moon Geun-young** - **Innocent Steps**	**Crying Fist**
Lifetime Achievement Award
**Yu Hyun-mok** (Director)
