= Kim Yoo-bin =

South Korean actress (born 2005)

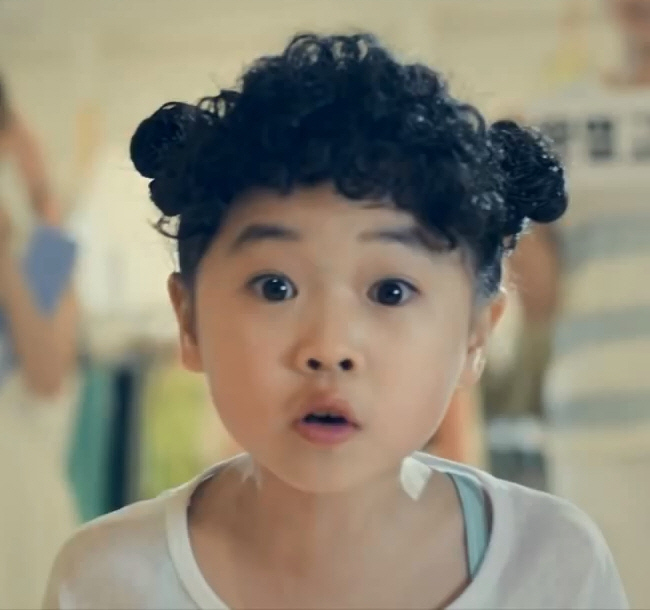
- Kim in 2013
- Born: January 14, 2005 (age 21); South Korea
- Occupation: Actress
- Years active: 2010–2016

Korean name
- Hangul: 김유빈
- RR: Gim Yubin
- MR: Kim Yubin

Kim Yoo-bin (Korean: 김유빈; born January 14, 2005) is a South Korean former child actress.

== Filmography ==
=== Film ===
Year	Title	Role
2009	Tidal Wave	Jin-soo
2013	The Gifted Hands	Da-hee

=== Television series ===
Year	Title	Role	Network
2010	Oh! My Lady	Ye-eun	SBS
2010	The Scarlet Letter	Jang Ha-ni	MBC
2010	MBC Sunday Drama Theater: "It's Me, Grandma"	young Ji-yoon	MBC
2011	Detectives in Trouble	Park Hae-in	KBS2
2011	49 Days	young Shin Ji-hyun	SBS
2011	Bravo, My Love!	Nam Da-reum	MBC
2011	The Princess' Man	Kim Ah-kang	KBS2
2012	To the Beautiful You	Min Hyeon-jae's sister	SBS
2013	The Fugitive of Joseon	Choi Rang	KBS2
2014	God's Gift: 14 Days	Han Saet-byul	SBS
2015	KBS TV Novel: "The Stars Are Shining"	Jo Bong-hee (young)	KBS2

== Awards and nominations ==
Year	Award	Category	Nominated work	Result
2011	MBC Drama Awards	Best Young Actress	Bravo, My Love!	Won
2011	KBS Drama Awards	Best Young Actress	The Princess' Man	Nominated
2012	5th Korea Drama Awards	Best Young Actress	Bravo, My Love!	Nominated
2013	KBS Drama Awards	Best Young Actress	The Fugitive of Joseon	Won
2014	7th Korea Drama Awards	Best Young Actress	God's Gift: 14 Days	Nominated
