= Hakuji no Hito =

- DVD cover
- Directed by: Banmei Takahashi
- Screenplay by: Tamio Hayashi
- Based on: Hakuji no Hito by Emiya Takayuki
- Produced by: Katsuhiro Ogawa; Muneyuki Kii; Hiroshi Nagasaka
- Starring: Hisashi Yoshizawa; Bae Soo-bin; Jeon Su-ji
- Cinematography: Na Hisoku
- Music by: Goro Yasukawa
- Production companies: AMAZONLATERNA Co., Ltd.
- Distributed by: T-Joy
- Release dates: June 9, 2012 (Japan); July 12, 2012 (South Korea)
- Running time: 119 minutes
- Country: Japan
- Languages: Japanese; Korean

Hakuji no Hito (Japanese: 道 〜白磁の人〜, Korean: 백자의 사람 조선의 흙이 되다), also known as The Way: Man of the White Porcelain and Takumi: The Man Beyond Borders in English, is a 2012 Japanese film directed by Banmei Takahashi based on a novel of the same name by Emiya Takayuki. It was released in 2012.

== Cast ==
- Hisashi Yoshizawa as Tagumi Asakawa
- Bae Soo-bin as Cheong-lim
- Jeon Su-ji as Ji-won
