= Somewhere Between (TV series) =

American drama television series

- Genre: Drama; Mystery
- Based on: God's Gift: 14 Days by Choi Ran
- Developed by: Stephen Tolkin
- Starring: Paula Patton; Devon Sawa; JR Bourne; Aria Birch; Serge Houde
- Composer: James Jandrisch
- Country of origin: United States
- Original language: English
- No. of seasons: 1
- No. of episodes: 10

Production
- Executive producers: Stephen Tolkin; Ivan Fecan; Joseph Broido; Tim Gamble; Matthew O'Connor; Choi Ran
- Production locations: Vancouver, British Columbia
- Running time: 43 minutes
- Production companies: The Lion & the Rose; ITV Studios America; Thunderbird Entertainment

Original release
- Network: ABC
- Release: July 24 – September 19, 2017

Somewhere Between is an American drama television series commissioned by ABC and produced by ITV Studios America and Thunderbird Entertainment. The series is an American adaptation of the Korean mystery TV show God's Gift: 14 Days, which aired on SBS. The series follows a mother who tries to change the fate of her daughter's murder. It stars Paula Patton, while Stephen Tolkin serves as writer and executive producer. Production began on March 7, 2017, in Vancouver, British Columbia. The series premiered as a summer replacement on July 24, 2017, and was cancelled after one season of 10 episodes.

== Cast ==
- Paula Patton as Laura Price – A local superstar news producer in San Francisco, helping the police to hunt down a serial killer. A fiercely loving mother, Laura's world comes to a crashing end when her daughter, Serena, is abducted and murdered by the killer. Attempting suicide, Laura inexplicably wakes up a week before Serena's death. From this point, Laura teams up with ex-cop Nico Jackson, who shared a similar "reset" moment, to track down the killer to change her daughter's fate.
- Devon Sawa as Nico Jackson – A former cop-turned-private investigator, Nico was a decorated SFPD detective whose fiancée, Susanna Spencer, was murdered; his brother, Danny, was convicted and sentenced to death for the crime, and Nico, believing he was guilty, testified against him. Struggling emotionally due to his loss, he was later fired from the police department for the brutal beating of a civilian. Turning to unscrupulous private eye work, Nico was almost killed and had a similar "reset" moment like Laura, waking up a week before Serena's death. Nico teams up with Laura to track down the killer.
- JR Bourne as Thomas "Tom" Price – Laura's powerful yet sensitive husband who is also the city's district attorney, Tom previously prosecuted the case against Danny and had him sentenced to death, although it is later implied he is hiding secrets regarding Danny's case. After Laura's "reset," he becomes increasingly concerned by her erratic behaviour.
- Aria Birch as Serena Price – Laura's and Tom's daughter, who is abducted and drowned by a serial killer targeted by her mother. Unable to cope, Laura attempted suicide three months after Serena's death in the same lake her body was found in, but instead wakes up a week before Serena's death, with an opportunity to change her fate.
- Catherine Barroll as Grace Jackson – Nico's and Danny's mother and Ruby's grandmother and caretaker, Grace is the only person who believes Danny is innocent, and she is desperately trying to prove his innocence before he is executed.
- Camille Mitchell as Esperanza, Laura's mother and Serena's grandmother, an expensively preserved beauty who lives in a high end psychiatric facility where Laura, Nico and Serena go to visit her. There's bad blood between Laura and her damaged mother, but Esperanza adores her grandchild Serena, and does her best to help them all out.
- Samantha Ferris as Capt. Kendra Sarneau – An SFPD captain and Nico's former boss, in charge of the police effort to track down the killer.
- Noel Johansen as Danny Jackson – Nico's brother, Grace's younger son and Ruby's father. Danny has an intellectual disability which his daughter inherited. Danny was convicted of killing three women, including his brother's fiancée Susanna, whose body Danny was found holding by his brother. Armed with a great deal of evidence, Danny's confession, and Nico's testimony against him in court, Tom successfully had Danny convicted and sentenced to death. Three months after Serena's death, Danny is executed by lethal injection; however, Nico's "reset" gives him the opportunity to change his fate.
- Imogen Tear as Ruby Jackson – Danny's daughter, Nico's niece and Grace's granddaughter. Ruby inherited the same intellectual disability as her father, but is happy and free-spirited. She becomes fast friends with Serena, much to Laura's anguish.
- Carmel Amit as Jenny – A private investigator and ex-con who is Nico's partner.
- Daniel Bacon as Inspector Glenn 'Cupcake' Kupner – An SFPD inspector and old friend of Nico's.
- Michael St. John Smith as Gov. Preston DeKizer – The governor of California. A strong supporter of the death penalty against convicted murderers, he is campaigning to have executions resumed, beginning with Danny's.
- Rebecca Staab as Colleen DeKizer – The governor's wife.
- Serge Houde as Richard Ruskin – The governor's experienced Chief of Staff, and an old political hand.
- Aaron Craven as Haskell Debray - Ruby's special needs instructor and a serial killer.

== Premise ==
Somewhere Between revolves around Laura Price and her daughter. After a series of murders in the vicinity, Laura realizes that she is reliving the day in a Groundhog Day–style reset. However, she has only one chance to understand what is happening and stop the killer from hurting her.

== Development ==
On February 16, 2016, ABC announced a 10-episode straight-to-series order for an American remake of the Korean TV series God's Gift: 14 Days, which aired on SBS. The show was scheduled to start shooting in Vancouver, Canada in March 2017, for an air date in July 2017, and was written by Stephen Tolkin. Production of the show began on March 7, 2017.

On January 26, 2017, it was announced that Paula Patton had been cast as the lead. On February 21, 2017, Devon Sawa was cast as the male lead. JR Bourne joined the cast two days later.

== Episodes ==
| No. | Title | Directed by | Written by | Original release date | US viewers (millions) |
|---|---|---|---|---|---|
| 1 | "For One to Live" | Duane Clark | Stephen Tolkin | July 24, 2017 | 2.91 |
A fisherman finds a shoe belonging to Serena Price, the daughter of overworked TV news producer Laura Price. In response to a serial killer targeting young women, the governor proposes resuming executions, starting with Danny Jackson, convicted of murder despite suffering from an intellectual disability. Two debt collectors, claiming Laura's husband owes their client money, break into her apartment. One of them is Nico Jackson, Danny's brother and a former police detective. Serena also meets Ruby, Danny's daughter, and runs away from home to spend time with her. On the way home, she and Laura meet a woman who prophesies that a tragedy will soon befall them. While Laura is preparing to air an exposé on the killer, he abducts Serena. Despite making a public appeal to spare her, Serena's body is eventually found floating in the water. Three months later, with Danny's execution impending, Nico is kidnapped by mobsters to be killed, while Laura prepares to commit suicide at the same place. When she wakes up, she finds herself three months into the past, eight days before Serena is taken and Serena still alive. However, she soon realizes that events have placed her in a time loop.
| 2 | "2.0" | Duane Clark | Stephen Tolkin | July 25, 2017 | 1.76 |
In a flashback to the previous episode, Nico is able to cut himself free and save Laura, thus creating the loop. Laura leaves a note for Tom and prepares to take Serena to Hawaii. Nico goes to confront the man who tried to kill him, but he remembers nothing. Deducing that the killer will be at a nightclub, Laura tries to warn the police, but they refuse to believe her. Nico learns that his brother's execution has yet to occur, confirming his place in the loop. Serena suffers an allergic reaction on the flight, forcing the plane to turn back. Recognizing the true meaning of the prophecy, she tries to find the woman for answers, but only learns that Nico was engaged to her daughter. As saving Serena is the only way to save Danny, Nico agrees to help her find the killer. Laura buys a stun gun and finds him in a nightclub, but Nico appears at the last second and persuades her to follow him outside instead. As it turns out, the perceived killer is a fellow detective following upon Laura's tip to the police, and Laura has the wrong club. Realizing her mistake, Laura goes to another club and is soon ambushed by the real killer. Nico is able to save her, but not the victim.
| 3 | "The Hunter and the Hunted" | David Frazee | Stephen Tolkin | August 1, 2017 | 1.67 |
While taking a photograph of something in a bag, Tom is distracted by a call from Laura. After talking their way out of police custody, Laura and Nico have Nico's partner Jenny start tracking down the location of the next victim. While staying home with her mother, Serena opens Tom's bag, which turns out to be the scarf used to kill Nico's fiancee. Ruby's special needs instructor, Haskell DeBray, is revealed to be the killer. Nico saves the victim, Mimi, and Laura switches clothes with her in order to help the police trap DeBray. Instead, he goes to Mimi's apartment and assaults her. Nico intercepts him, but he escapes with Laura in tow; she flips the car and tries to burn him to death before Nico saves him. As a consequence, Mimi survives her beating. However, the police find no physical evidence linking DeBray to his alleged crimes. Laura persuades Nico to break into his home, where they find jewelry from the previous victims—only to have every one disqualified as evidence. Laura steals a gun and confronts him, but Nico stops her before being taken in for questioning. Tom takes another picture, this time of the rings, and sends it to an unknown contact.
| 4 | "Fate Takes a Holiday" | David Frazee | Shelley Eriksen | August 8, 2017 | 1.44 |
Laura gets Jenny to tail DeBray home while she keeps an eye on Mimi. Nico faces the possibility of being charged with theft and assault for his past actions. When the hospital is forced to evacuate due to a bomb threat, Laura deduces that DeBray is responsible and manages to subdue him, but he is murdered while in police custody. Though distraught, both Nico and Laura believe this to be the end of their troubles. Tom uses a time capsule from Serena to hide the rings. A confession found on DeBray reveals that he targeted mothers who "abandoned" their children. Nico warns his mother to stay away from Tom's family. Laura learns that DeBray was killed in the past at least a week before Serena's death. She and Nico realize that whoever took Serena was impersonating him, and that with crucial evidence missing, their best lead lies within the police. Tom agrees to set up an investigation, but warns Nico to avoid a relationship with Laura. The next day, while getting breakfast, she runs into a strange man who leaves a package for Tom, who assures her that he was not DeBray's killer. Mimi dies in the hospital.
| 5 | "Into the Fire" | Mathias Herndl | Wil Zmak | August 15, 2017 | 1.58 |
The next day, Laura goes through Tom's shredder and finds an uncut piece, which she brings to Nico. They also learn of Mimi's death. Nico and Jenny tail Tom from his office and photograph him entering an apartment, where they discover him having an affair. When Nico hesitates to tell Laura, Jenny recognizes that he has feelings for her. When he does, Laura identifies the woman as her friend Mara. Suspecting that Tom knows something, she confronts him. Mara comes to Laura's apartment with a gun and explains that Tom forced her to abort their child, before police arrive and arrest her. A man then abducts her, and Serena calls Nico over. Jenny confirms that the abductor is the same man who killed DeBray, and he summons Nico to threaten him and Laura to stop digging. At a vigil for deceased singer Jesse Reid, Ruby and Serena slip into his mansion unaware that the abductor is following them. Nico discovers that the man had the same tattoo as Jesse, and that Susanna's father designed it. Laura leaves with Nico and Serena, while Tom goes to retrieve the capsule only to find it missing. Cupcake finds a glove from the abductor that Nico had alerted him to and destroys it.
| 6 | "Madness" | Mathias Herndl | Stephen Cochrane | August 22, 2017 | 1.61 |
Laura and Nico go to see Susanna's father Simon, while Tom gets the police to search for them. After an encounter at a gas station, Nico takes them to hide in his brother's bunker, where he relives the night of Susanna's murder. Meanwhile, two hitmen follow their trail. Simon initially refuses to help, but ultimately relents and identifies one of the men as Jason Tanner, committed to the same mental hospital as Esperanza, Laura's mother. Despite some bad blood, she gets them access to Jason. Jason starts screaming when he sees the picture, but Laura gets him to calm down, whereupon he reveals a hidden mural depicting how Susanna died. Nico gets into a fight with one of the hitmen, who have tracked them down. He subdues both of them, but they escape. Esperanza distracts them by pretending to be insane, and Tom is warned of consequences if Laura is not found. Using the evidence, Nico deduces that someone is killing off the people in the photo, and that something is compelling Danny to take the fall for what happened to Susanna. Danny confesses the truth: that Nico killed Susanna while drunk, and he let himself be arrested to protect him.
| 7 | "The Fourth Man" | Michael Nankin | Jennica Harper | August 29, 2017 | 1.71 |
As the police close in on their location, Nico tells Laura the truth about the night Susanna died. Laura refuses to believe he killed her and pleads with him to help keep Serena safe instead of turning himself in. Tom is warned again in person to find Laura. Nico and Laura try to unravel the truth with Grace's case files while Serena calls Tom. They narrowly avoid Tom and follow the clues to Shelly Rockland, a witness who was filming the night Susanna died. The Governor is pushed to move the executions forward, starting with Danny. The video footage proves Nico is innocent and he confronts Cupcake about his corruption. In shame and fear, Cupcake takes his own life. Using his body, Nico sets a trap for the fourth man in a junkyard, but he escapes, leaving behind a strand of hair. Laura finds the jewelry Tom hid and tries to leverage the truth out of him. In response, he has her forcibly committed for 72 hours. Having anticipated this, Laura leaves the evidence he wants with Nico, and he recovers it.
| 8 | "Destiny's Child" | Michael Nankin | Shelley Eriksen | September 5, 2017 | 1.78 |
Despite Laura's disappearance, Nico is determined to prevent Serena's abduction. Laura convinces Tom to approve a family visit. When Serena arrives wearing the clothes she died in, Laura panics and tries to explain herself to Tom. Believing her to be truly insane, he leaves. Afterwards, the governor asks him to take part in a debate at the station where Serena was taken, which he accepts. Nico tries to follow, but gets held up by a parking violation. Laura manages to get her hands on a phone, but Serena ignores her call. Nico arrives too late, as Serena is abducted, but he follows her until he finds her discarded tracker. Laura successfully escapes from the hospital and meets Tom, who explains that the people who took Serena want the jewelry. Nico arranges a meeting to hand it over. The governor, in a meeting with his family, decides to proceed with Danny's execution. Nico receives a file on the fourth man, who turns out to be legally dead. He gets delayed en route to Laura when his mother suffers a heart attack, causing him to realize that the jewelry is the only way to prove Danny's innocence and save her. He ends up giving Laura the file and leaves.
| 9 | "Ghost" | David Frazee | Wil Zmak & Geoff Nauffts & Stephen Tolkin | September 12, 2017 | 1.62 |
Laura takes the file to Capt. Sarneau who agrees to look into it with a contact in the FBI. Nico visits the governor's home and runs into Logan, afterwards calling the kidnappers to arrange a meeting to trade the jewelry for Serena. He gets the jump on the kidnapper Kyle at the meeting but more mercs show up and overpower Nico and re-capture Serena. Back at the caravan she's being held, Serena catches a glimpse of the person behind the events, the governor's wife Colleen DeKizer, who Kyle calls "mom". Colleen goes to the governor's advisor Ruskin, and they call Tom with two options: bring the jewelry and let his wife die, or his daughter will die. Tom convinces Laura that giving up the jewelry is the only way to save Serena, and they arrange to meet at Nico's so Tom can take the jewelry to the people who want them. Tom admits his ambition setting off the chain of events to Laura, before handing over the jewelry to the mercs who immediately kill him, but Nico and Laura manage to get away. The two of them figure out Ruskin and DeKizer must be behind everything, and further deduce that DeKizer's son Logan is Susanna's killer after viewing photos recovered from Danny's camera.
| 10 | "One Must Die" | David Frazee | Stephen Tolkin | September 19, 2017 | 1.88 |
Nico and Laura pay a visit to Ruskin in order to get information about Serena's whereabouts. Serena meanwhile realises that Kyle isn't a bad guy, he's just sad, as while he is holding her captive he has been genuinely taking care of her. The fondness he's developed for the girl leads him to try and protect her when his brother and mother show up to take her away, an act he pays for when Logan shoots him. Serena is taken away but remembers some defence training Kyle gave her and manages to cause Logan to lose control of the car and crash, giving her time to escape with Logan's phone. She calls Ruby who is with her grandma as they pray Danny will be spared from his execution. The pair race to pick her up and Grace texts Tom's phone telling him she has her daughter and that he can have her if he calls off Danny's execution, unaware that Tom is already dead. Meanwhile Laura and Nico have arrived at the caravan where they found a wounded Kyle who confesses the truth about what happened to Susanna, providing them with video evidence of the event which he has kept hidden. Knowing this is the smoking gun they need, Laura and Nico rush to where the Governor is giving his speech before Danny's execution where they give the video to one of her KMSF colleagues to air. As they wait to get into the venue Nico gets a call from Grace, who is shocked to learn that Tom is dead and she has been communicating with the enemy. Nico tells her to run and he'll find her, and he and Laura decide to part ways so that she can save his brother and he can save Serena. As Grace and the girls drive away they see Logan also on the road. With everyone racing towards Black Pine Cove, where Serena was found dead on the original timeline, the pressure is on.
