= Marathon (2005 film) =

2005 South Korean biographical film

- Theatrical release poster
- Hangul: 말아톤
- RR: Maraton
- MR: Marat'on
- Directed by: Jeong Yoon-cheol
- Written by: Yoon Jin-ho; Song Ye-jin; Jeong Yoon-cheol
- Produced by: Seok Myeong-hong; Lee Seung-yeop; Shin Chang-hwan
- Starring: Cho Seung-woo; Kim Mi-sook
- Cinematography: Kwon Hyeok-jun
- Edited by: Hahm Sung-won; Nam In-ju
- Music by: Kim Jun-seong
- Distributed by: Showbox
- Release date: January 27, 2005
- Running time: 117 minutes
- Country: South Korea
- Language: Korean
- Box office: US$33.3 million

Marathon (Korean: 말아톤) is a 2005 South Korean drama film directed by Jeong Yoon-cheol, and starring Cho Seung-woo and Kim Mi-sook. It received 5,148,022 admissions, making it the 4th most attended Korean film of 2005.

Based on the true story of Bae Hyeong-jin, an autistic marathon runner, the film popularized the South Korean term for autism (자폐증; japyejeung) which can be translated as "self-closed syndrome."

== Plot ==
A young man with autism, named Cho-won, finds release only in running. As a child, Cho-won regularly had meltdowns, bit himself, and struggled to communicate with others—finding solace only in zebras and the Korean snack, choco pie. His mother never gave up on him and was determined to prove to the world that her child can achieve. As Cho-won gets older, he begins to find a passion for running and his mother is there to encourage and support him. Even though their family suffers from financial difficulties, they find a former marathon champion, Jung-wook — now a lethargic older man with an alcohol problem.

Jung-wook, who is serving community service hours as a physical education teacher for a DUI, grudgingly accepts the offer to train Cho-won in marathon running, but eventually becomes lazy with him. The coach often takes Cho-won's snack, and takes Cho-won to a jjimjilbang to relax. Even though Jung-wook slacks off most of the time, Cho-won's determination for running is firm (he accidentally runs 100 laps around a soccer field when the coach told him to without literally meaning it).

He takes third place in a 10 km running race, which causes his mother to set another goal for her son: to run a full marathon under three hours. This is not an easy task, however, as Cho-won wants to win but doesn't know how to pace himself. Therefore, his mother pleads the coach to run with Cho-won in order to teach him how to pace his running. The movie shows the emotional struggles of a mother who is not sure if she is forcing her son to run or if it truly is his passion. The movie further explores and shows deep love and genuine purity through Cho-won.

== Cast ==
- Cho Seung-woo as Cho-won
- Kim Mi-sook as Kyeong-sook, Cho-won's mother
- Lee Ki-young as Jung-wook
- Baek Sung-hyun as Yun Jung-won
- Ahn Nae-sang as Hee-geun, Cho-won's father
- Jeon Su-ji as Se-yoon

== Remake ==
A Japanese drama remake of the same title (マラソン) aired on TBS on September 20, 2007. It starred Ninomiya Kazunari in the lead role.

== Awards and nominations ==
Year	Award	Category	Recipients	Result	Ref.
2005	41st Baeksang Arts Awards	Grand Prize (Daesang)	Marathon	Won	
2005	41st Baeksang Arts Awards	Best Film	Marathon	Nominated	
2005	41st Baeksang Arts Awards	Best Actor	Cho Seung-woo	Won	
2005	41st Baeksang Arts Awards	Best Screenplay	Jeong Yoon-cheol	Won	
2005	41st Baeksang Arts Awards	Best New Director	Jeong Yoon-cheol	Nominated	
2005	13th Chunsa Film Art Awards	Best New Director	Jeong Yoon-cheol	Won	
2005	13th Chunsa Film Art Awards	Best Actor	Cho Seung-woo	Nominated	
2005	13th Chunsa Film Art Awards	Best Actress	Kim Mi-sook	Nominated	
2005	6th Busan Film Critics Awards	Best Actor	Cho Seung-woo	Won	
2005	42nd Grand Bell Awards	Best Film	Marathon	Won	
2005	42nd Grand Bell Awards	Best Actor	Cho Seung-woo	Won	
2005	42nd Grand Bell Awards	Popularity Award	Cho Seung-woo	Won	
2005	42nd Grand Bell Awards	Best Actress	Kim Mi-sook	Nominated	
2005	42nd Grand Bell Awards	Best Supporting Actor	Lee Ki-young	Nominated	
2005	42nd Grand Bell Awards	Best New Director	Jeong Yoon-cheol	Won	
2005	42nd Grand Bell Awards	Best Screenplay	Jeong Yoon-cheol	Won	
2005	42nd Grand Bell Awards	Best Planning	Seok Myeong-hong	Won	
2005	42nd Grand Bell Awards	Best Music	Kim Jun-seong	Won	
2005	26th Blue Dragon Film Awards	Best Film	Marathon	Nominated	
2005	26th Blue Dragon Film Awards	Best Leading Actor	Cho Seung-woo	Nominated	
2005	26th Blue Dragon Film Awards	Popular Star Award	Cho Seung-woo	Won	
2005	26th Blue Dragon Film Awards	Best New Director	Jeong Yoon-cheol	Won	
2005	26th Blue Dragon Film Awards	Best Screenplay	Jeong Yoon-cheol	Nominated	
2005	26th Blue Dragon Film Awards	Best Music	Kim Jun-seong	Won	
2005	4th Korean Film Awards	Best Film	Marathon	Nominated	
2005	4th Korean Film Awards	Best Actor	Cho Seung-woo	Nominated	
2005	4th Korean Film Awards	Best Actress	Kim Mi-sook	Nominated	
2005	4th Korean Film Awards	Best Supporting Actor	Lee Ki-young	Nominated	
2005	4th Korean Film Awards	Best Screenplay	Jeong Yoon-cheol	Nominated	
2005	4th Korean Film Awards	Best New Director	Jeong Yoon-cheol	Nominated	
2005	8th Director's Cut Awards	Best New Director	Jeong Yoon-cheol	Won	
2005	1st Premiere Rising Star Awards	Best Actor	Cho Seung-woo	Won	
2005	14th Golden Rooster and Hundred Flowers Film Festival	Best Actor in a Foreign Film	Cho Seung-woo	Won	

== See also ==
- Rain Man
