= God's Gift: 14 Days =

- Promotional poster
- Genre: Time travel Thriller
- Written by: Choi Ran
- Directed by: Lee Dong-hoon
- Starring: Lee Bo-young; Cho Seung-woo; Kim Tae-woo; Jung Gyu-woon; Kim Yoo-bin
- Music by: Tu-web; Park Ki-heon
- Country of origin: South Korea
- Original language: Korean
- No. of episodes: 16

Production
- Executive producer: Han Jung-hwan
- Producer: Lee Hee-soo
- Production location: Korea
- Running time: Mondays and Tuesdays at 21:55 (KST)
- Production company: Content K

Original release
- Network: SBS TV
- Release: March 3 – April 22, 2014

Related
- Somewhere Between

God's Gift – 14 Days (Korean: 신의 선물 – 14일; RR: Sinui seonmul – 14il) is a 2014 South Korean television series written by Choi Ran (the writer of Iljimae), starring Lee Bo-young, Cho Seung-woo, Kim Tae-woo, Jung Gyu-woon and Kim Yoo-bin. It aired on SBS TV from March 3 to April 22, 2014, on Mondays and Tuesdays at 21:55 for 16 episodes.

== Plot Summary ==
Kim Soo-hyun is a mother whose young daughter Han Saet-byul gets kidnapped and murdered. Discovering a miraculous ability to go back in time exactly two weeks before the event, Soo-hyun is determined to expose the kidnapping plot and save her daughter before she dies all over again. Helping her is Ki Dong-chan, a former cop turned private investigator out to prove the innocence of his mentally challenged brother, who is falsely accused of murdering Dong-chan's ex-girlfriend. As Soo-hyun and Dong-chan race against the clock in the allotted 14 days, new light is shed on the crimes, and they uncover secrets far more treacherous than Soo-hyun could have ever imagined.

== Cast ==
=== Main characters ===
- Lee Bo-young as Kim Soo-hyun

A successful TV writer for a current affairs program. She travels back in time to bring her dead child back to life.

- Cho Seung-woo as Ki Dong-chan

He was once an outstanding police officer, who left the force after a certain incident. Now a private investigator, Dong-chan has a personal connection to the case and helps Soo-hyun when she goes back in time.

- Kim Tae-woo as Han Ji-hoon

He is a human rights lawyer who is passionate about his work and is a loving husband to Soo-hyun and devoted father to Saet-byul. But he is also harboring a secret.

- Jung Gyu-woon as Hyun Woo-jin

A detective in the violent crimes division, he graduated the police academy at the top of his class and is already known as future police commissioner material. He is Soo-hyun's first love, and she suddenly comes to him out of nowhere and begs him to find the suspect who will kill her daughter in two weeks' time. Initially disbelieving, he gets sucked into the case and puts his career on the line to help her.

- Kim Yoo-bin as Han Saet-byul

Soo-hyun and Ji-hoon's daughter. Saet-byul is quirky and cute, though a bit of an outsider at school. She doesn't get good grades, but is warm and kind despite the fact that the other kids leave her out and call her the weird kid. Her one friend is Young-gyu.

=== Supporting characters ===
- Kim Jin-hee as Joo Min-ah

Soo-hyun's junior colleague who had an affair with Ji-hoon. She became pregnant with his child, but miscarried when she fell down the stairs while Ji-hoon was forcing her to go to an abortion clinic.

- Jung Hye-sun as Lee Soon-nyeo

Mother of Dong-chan and Dong-ho. She takes care of her grandson Young-gyu.

- Joo Jin-mo as Lee Myeong-han

Presidential chief of staff.

- Ahn Se-ha as Na Ho-gook

Dong-chan's junior colleague when he was in the police force.

- Han Sun-hwa as Jenny

She started out as a con artist who had already been to jail five times, until Dong-chan hired her as a fraud detection expert.

- Jung Eun-pyo as Ki Dong-ho

Dong-chan's older brother, and Young-gyu's father. Falsely accused and imprisoned for the murder of Dong-chan's girlfriend, Soo-jung.

- Cha Sun-woo as Ki Young-gyu

A developmentally disabled teenage boy with the mental age of a six-year-old. He is Saet-byul's friend, and tries to save her from the kidnapper.

- Yeon Jae-wook as Wang Byeong-tae

Expert hacker who works at Dong-chan's private investigator office.

- Park Hye-sook as Jang Mi-soon

Soo-hyun's mother.

- Shin Goo as Choo Byeong-woo

A businessman disguised as a homeless bum.

- Kang Shin-il as Kim Nam-joon

The President of South Korea.

- Ye Soo-jung as Park Ji-young

The First Lady.

- No Min-woo as Theo

After witnessing his beloved older brother's suicide, he went into a long period of depression. He decides to fulfill his brother's lifelong dream of becoming a musician in his place, and successfully becomes the front man of the rock band Snake. He is Saet-byul's favorite idol singer. However, unforeseen events threaten to quash his dreams altogether when the shoe of a missing child is discovered in his van. Although he isn't prosecuted as a criminal, he is still considered as a possible suspect in the case.

- Oh Tae-kyung as Jang Moon-soo or Chang Moon-soo

Owner of stationery shop.

- Im Ji-kyu as Ryu Jin-woo
- Park Min-jung as Mimi
- Jang In-sub as Manager
- Kim Min-chan as Soo-hyun's junior colleague (ep 1)
- Lee Yeon-kyung as owner of Destiny Cafe (ep 1)
- Kim Il-joong as MC (ep 1–2)
- Lee Seung-hyung as TV director/PD (ep 1–2)
- Joo Ho as Kim Joon-seo (ep 2)

The President's son.

- Kang Sung-jin as Cha Bong-sub (ep 3–6)

Serial killer who murdered three women, including Young-gyu's mother and Dong-ho's friend Mimi.

- Kwak Jung-wook as Han Ki-tae (ep 5–6)
- Kang Byul as Ki-tae's girlfriend (ep 6)
- Choi Min-chul
- Lee Si-won as Lee Soo-jung

Dong-chan's girlfriend who was murdered.

== Original soundtrack ==
No.	Title	Artist	Length
1.	"너에게 갈 수 있다면" (If Only I Can Go to You)	Song Ji-eun	4:13
2.	"너에게 갈 수 있다면 (Inst.)" (If Only I Can Go to You (Inst.))		4:13
3.	"나라면" (If It Were Me)	Yang Ji-won (Spica)	4:12
4.	"나라면 (Inst.)" (If It Were Me (Inst.))		4:12
5.	"아파서" (Because It Hurts)	Sandeul (B1A4)	3:44
6.	"아파서 (Inst.)" (Because It Hurts (Inst.))		3:44
7.	"봄날의 꽃" (Spring Flower)	Kim Joo-hoon (Remember)
8.	"봄날의 꽃 (Inst.)" (Spring Flower (Inst.))
9.	"운명에 대하여..."	Various Artists
10.	"신의 선물 -14일 (Main Theme)" (God's Gift – 14 Days (Main Theme))	Various Artists
11.	"오래전 기억"	Various Artists
12.	"묻지마 써포터즈"	Various Artists
13.	"슬픈 운명" (Sad Fate)	Various Artists
14.	"헤파이토스"	Various Artists
15.	"Lonely Memory (동찬의 테마)" (Lonely Memory (Dong-chan's Theme))	Various Artists
16.	"운명의 시작"	Various Artists
17.	"절망의 슬픔"	Various Artists
18.	"뒤바뀐 운명"	Various Artists
19.	"따스한 미소"	Various Artists
20.	"식구끼리 이러는 거 아니야"	Various Artists
21.	"그림자 찾기"	Various Artists
22.	"Time Warp"	Various Artists
23.	"잃어버린 시간"	Various Artists
24.	"그림자" (Shadow)	Various Artists
25.	"절망의 시간"	Various Artists
26.	"딱지치기"	Various Artists
27.	"쿨한 남자"	Various Artists
28.	"숨소리"	Various Artists
29.	"어른들의 동화"	Various Artists

== Ratings ==
In the table below, the blue numbers represent the lowest ratings and the red numbers represent the highest ratings.

Episode #	Original broadcast date	Average audience share			
Episode #	Original broadcast date	TNmS Ratings		AGB Nielsen	
Episode #	Original broadcast date	Nationwide	Seoul National Capital Area	Nationwide	Seoul National Capital Area
1	March 3, 2014	6.7%	7.5%	6.9%	7.2%
2	March 4, 2014	8.3%	9.5%	7.7%	8.2%
3	March 10, 2014	8.8%	11.0%	8.9%	8.9%
4	March 11, 2014	8.9%	11.3%	9.1%	9.6%
5	March 17, 2014	9.3%	11.0%	9.7%	10.4%
6	March 18, 2014	10.2%	12.4%	9.4%	9.8%
7	March 24, 2014	10.0%	12.4%	8.8%	9.5%
8	March 25, 2014	10.7%	12.8%	10.6%	12.0%
9	March 31, 2014	9.5%	11.8%	8.8%	9.6%
10	April 1, 2014	9.4%	10.9%	9.4%	10.5%
11	April 7, 2014	9.5%	11.7%	9.2%	9.7%
12	April 8, 2014	9.8%	11.7%	8.9%	9.8%
13	April 14, 2014	9.5%	11.8%	8.5%	8.5%
14	April 15, 2014	10.0%	12.1%	8.7%	9.2%
15	April 21, 2014	8.2%	10.2%	8.3%	8.9%
16	April 22, 2014	9.5%	11.6%	8.4%	9.0%
Average		9.3%	11.2%	8.8%	9.5%

== Awards and nominations ==
Year	Award	Category	Recipient	Result
2014	50th Baeksang Arts Awards	Best New Actor (TV)	Baro	Nominated
2014	16th Seoul International Youth Film Festival	Best New Actor	Baro	Nominated
2014	16th Seoul International Youth Film Festival	Best OST by a Male Artist	Because It Hurts (by Sandeul)	Nominated
2014	7th Korea Drama Awards	Best Young Actor/Actress	Kim Yoo-bin	Nominated
2014	3rd APAN Star Awards	Best New Actor	Baro	Nominated
2014	22nd SBS Drama Awards	Top Excellence Award, Actor in a Miniseries	Cho Seung-woo	Nominated
2014	22nd SBS Drama Awards	Top Excellence Award, Actress in a Miniseries	Lee Bo-young	Nominated
2014	22nd SBS Drama Awards	Excellence Award, Actor in a Miniseries	Kim Tae-woo	Nominated
2014	22nd SBS Drama Awards	Excellence Award, Actor in a Miniseries	Jung Gyu-woon	Nominated
2014	22nd SBS Drama Awards	Special Award, Actor in a Miniseries	Shin Goo	Nominated
2014	22nd SBS Drama Awards	Special Award, Actress in a Miniseries	Jung Hye-sun	Nominated
2014	22nd SBS Drama Awards	New Star Award	Han Sun-hwa	Won

== International broadcast ==
It aired in Thailand on PPTV beginning October 7, 2014, dubbed as Sibsee Wan Sawan Kamnod . ("14 วัน สวรรค์กำหนด").

It aired in Vietnam on HTV7 beginning June 9, 2015, dubbed as 14 Ngày Về Quá Khứ.

== Remake ==
On December 16, 2016, ABC announced a 10 episode straight-to-series order for an American remake of the series which is titled Somewhere Between, and was shot in Vancouver, Canada, in March 2017, and started airing in June 2017. It was written by Stephen Tolkin (Legend of the Seeker, Brothers & Sisters). Paula Patton, Devon Sawa and JR Bourne star as the main characters. The series was cancelled after one season.
