= Jeon Su-ji =

South Korean actress (born 1983)

- Born: 10 November 1983 (age 42); Seoul, South Korea
- Other names: Jeon Soo-ji, Jun Su-ji
- Education: Korea National University of Arts Theater Academy (Bachelor of Acting)
- Occupation: Actress
- Years active: 2003–present
- Agent: Youth Entertainment
- Known for: Designated Survivor: 60 Days; Sin Don; Green Mothers' Club

Jeon Su-ji (born 10 November 1983) is a South Korean actress. She is known for her roles in dramas such as Designated Survivor: 60 Days, Signal, Sin Don and Green Mothers' Club. She also appeared in movies Marathon, Closer to heaven, Radio Dayz, Emergency Declaration and The Terror Live.

== Filmography ==
=== Television series ===
Year	Title	Role	Ref.
2003	Merry Go Round	Han-jun	
2003	A Saint and a Witch	Ms. Park	
2004	Phoenix	Jeon-ah	
2005	5th Republic	Park Geun-ryeong	
2005	Shin Don	Ban-ya's mother	
2008	My Sweet Seoul	Soon-young	
2016	KBS Drama Special: "The Red Teacher"	Madame Chae	
2016	Signal	Kang Hye-seung	
2018	Live	Child's mother	
2019	JTBC Drama Festa: "Luwak Human"	Choi Mi-ji	
2019	Designated Survivor: 60 Days	Heo Jin-joo	
2021	Kingdom	Ashin's mother	
2022	Green Mothers' Club	Min-ji's mother	
2023	Pale Moon	Oh Sook-ja's daughter	
2024	Captivating the King	Court Lady Han	
2024	Doctor Slump	Lawyer	
2024	Parasyte: The Grey	Soo-in's mother	
2024	The 8 Show	Sang-gook's wife	
2024	The Auditors	Chae Jong-u's wife	
2024	Seoul Busters	Hyeon-a	
2024	A Virtuous Business	Um Seo-yeon	

=== Film ===
Year	Title		Role
Year	English	Korean	Role
2005	Marathon	말아톤	Se-yoon
2005	Bravo, My Life	사랑해, 말순씨	Bank Employee
2005	Radio Dayz	라듸오 데이즈	Madam Kakadu
2005	A Man Who Was Superman	슈퍼맨이었던 사나이	Parking lot woman
2009	Closer to heaven	내 사랑 내 곁에	Kim Jong-do's wife
2010	Harmony	하모니	Assistant Kang
2010	Seoul	서울	Writer
2011	Sorry, Thank you	미안해, 고마워	Mother
2011	Couples	커플즈	Prospective bride
2012	Love Fiction	러브 픽션	Art teacher
2012	Hakuji no Hito	백자의 사람 조선의 흙이 되다	Ji-won
2013	South Bound	남쪽으로 튀어	Teacher Oh
2013	The Terror Live	더 테러 라이브	Policewoman
2014	Whistle Blower	제보자	Researcher
2015	The Chosen: Forbidden Cave	퇴마 : 무녀굴	Lee Young-rye
2016	Upstanding Man	일어서는 인간	So-ra
2018	Never Ever Rush	너는 결코 서둘지 말라	Ye-ji
2020	Lingering	호텔 레이크	Choi Yoon-hee
2022	Emergency Declaration	비상선언	Assistant Oh
2023	The Tenants	세입자	Female Official
2023	12.12: The Day	서울의 봄	Lee Tae-shin's wife
2024	Wonderland	원더랜드	Jung-in's senior

== Theatre ==
Year	Title	Korean Title	Role
2014	Still Life	정물화	Nanako
2014	Wrestling Season	레슬링 시즌	Ellen
2014	Good Luck	즐거운 복희	Yoo Bok-hee
2015	Adventure King & God Adventure King	모험왕 & 신 모험왕	Sun-hee
2015	Typhoon Story	태풍기담	Lee So-eun
2016	Two Rooms	두 개의 방	Rainy
2016	A Heart Of Science - The Depths Of The Forest	과학하는마음 - 숲의 심연	Grace
2017	Language Archive	랭귀지 아카이브	Marie
2019	Doosan Humanities Theater 2019 Apartment - Iron Bag Tracking Operation	두산인문극장 2019 아파트 - 철가방 추적작전	Choi Yoon-woo
2019	Crystal Night	수정의 밤	Go Eun-ma

== Awards and nominations ==
Name of the award ceremony, year presented, category, nominee of the award, and the result of the nomination
Award ceremony	Year	Category	Result	Ref.
4th Asiana International Short Film Festival	2006	Best New Actress	Won	
