= Behind Your Touch =

2023 South Korean television series

- Promotional poster
- Hangul: 힙하게
- Lit.: Hip
- RR: Hiphage
- MR: Hiphage
- Genre: Comedy drama; Suspense thriller; Fantasy
- Written by: Lee Nam-gyu; Oh Bo-hyeon; Kim Da-hee
- Directed by: Kim Seok-yoon; Choi Bo-yoon
- Starring: Han Ji-min; Lee Min-ki; Suho
- Music by: Kim Tae-seong
- Country of origin: South Korea
- Original language: Korean
- No. of episodes: 16

Production
- Executive producer: Kim Sung-ah
- Producers: Bae Soo-jung; Kim Seok-yoon; Hang Ra-kyung
- Production companies: SLL; Studio Phoenix

Original release
- Network: JTBC
- Release: August 12 – October 1, 2023

Behind Your Touch (Korean: 힙하게) is a 2023 South Korean supernatural mystery drama television series starring Han Ji-min, Lee Min-ki, and Suho. It aired on JTBC from August 12, to October 1, 2023, every Saturday and Sunday at 22:30 (KST). It is also available for streaming on TVING in South Korea and on Netflix in selected regions.

== Synopsis ==
Bong Ye-bun, a small-town veterinarian, gains the psychic ability to see past memories by touching the rear end of people or animals. She teams up with Moon Jang-yeol, a hot-tempered detective who has been demoted from Seoul to a rural village. Hoping to solve a major case and get his career back on track, Jang-yeol pushes Ye-bun to use her strange psychometric powers to investigate minor crimes and help keep the town safe. As their working relationship develops, the quiet town of Mujin is suddenly shaken by a series of unsettling murders. Ye-bun and Jang-yeol quickly find themselves in over their heads when they realize a dangerous serial killer is hiding in plain sight. Determined to protect the locals and uncover the truth about their own pasts, the unlikely duo is forced to set aside their differences. They rely on quirky townspeople for clues and navigate several close calls as they try to figure out who the killer might be.

Early on, Jang-yeol suspects Kim Seon-woo, a kind and handsome newcomer who works at the local convenience store. While Ye-bun develops a deep crush on Seon-woo and strongly defends his innocence, his behavior continues to seem highly suspicious. Eventually, everything comes together in a final, dramatic confrontation that reveals the true culprit and brings the case to a close.

== Cast ==
=== Main ===
- Han Ji-min as Bong Ye-bun

Veterinarian with psychometric powers. At a dairy farm where she reluctantly made house calls, she gained the psychic ability to see people's pasts. She gets caught up in a series of inexplicable murders that happen one after the other.

- Lee Min-ki as Moon Jang-yeol

Hot-blooded detective. He was sent from Seoul Police Department to Mujin Police Department in a rural town. He makes Ye-bun use her psychic abilities in the course of a murder investigation.

- Suho as Kim Seon-woo

Mysterious convenience store worker. Bong Ye-bun has a crush on him. Graduated from Korea University. Suspected by Jang-yeol of involvement in a serial murder case.

- Joo Min-kyung as Bae Ok-hee

Ye-bun's best friend. Her language is rough and she is considered the town's odd woman out.

=== Supporting ===
==== Ye-bun's family ====
- Yang Jae-seong as Jung Eui-hwan

Ye-bun's maternal grandfather and former director of Jeong Animal Hospital. He is a Parkinson's disease patient. He is searching for the truth behind his late daughter's death.

- Park Sung-yeon as Jung Hyeon-ok

Ye-bun's aunt who is a nurse at Bong Animal Hospital. She is still enamoured of her first love, Jong-mook.

==== Police officers ====
- Kim Hee-won as Won Jong-mook

Chief of Mujin Police Station Violent Department. Hyeon-ok's first love. Tries to stay away from Jung Hyeon-ok but always finds himself near her.

- Jung Yi-rang as Na Mi-ran

Detective. She is troubled by her husband's infidelity.

- Jo Min-guk as Bae Deok-hee

The youngest detective who helps Jang-yeol. Ok-hee's brother.

==== Others ====
- Lee Seung-joon as Cha Ju-man

A Mujin native who is a member of the National Assembly of Mujin City.

- Park Hyuk-kwon as Park Jong-bae

livelihood shaman. He earns money for his son and wife, but funds are low.

- Park No-sik as Jeon Gwang-sik

A farm owner who has supernatural powers. He aids Jang-yeol in finding the serial killer.

=== Extended ===
- Choi Hee-jin as Kim Si-a

A streamer.

- Lee Seon-joo as Ok-hee's mother

Convenience store owner.

- Kwon Young-guk as Ok-hee's father

Captain.

- Lee Hwi-jong as Yeom Jong-hyuk

Ok-bun senior

=== Special appearances ===
- Lee Jung-eun as herself

Prisoners in Seoul Prison (Ep. 16)

- Jang Do-yeon as TV Program Host(Ep. 16)

== Production ==
Filming of the series was completed on February 20, 2023.

== Original soundtrack ==
Behind Your Touch OST

Soundtrack album by Various artists
- Recorded: 2023
- Genre: Soundtrack
- Language: Korean
- Labels: YG Plus; Studio Maum C, SLL

=== Part 1 ===
Released on August 13, 2023
No.	Title	Lyrics	Music	Artist	Length
1.	"Hip Hop"	Joohoney; Ye-Yo!; Laser	Joohoney; Ye-Yo!	Joohoney	2:11
2.	"Hip Hop" (Inst.)		Joohoney; Ye-Yo!		2:11
Total length:					4:22

=== Part 2 ===
Released on August 20, 2023
No.	Title	Lyrics	Music	Artist	Length
1.	"It's you" (feat. Cocona)	pH-1; MaO; Naviv	Naviv; Lee Jun-hyung	pH-1	3:10
2.	"It's you" (feat. Cocona; Inst.)		Naviv; Lee Jun-hyung		3:10
Total length:					3:20

=== Part 3 ===
Released on August 27, 2023
No.	Title	Lyrics	Music	Artist	Length
1.	"Gotcha"	CROQ; Jade; Spacecowboy	CROQ; Jade; Spacecowboy	Zior Park	2:51
2.	"Gotcha" (Inst.)		CROQ; Jade; Spacecowboy		2:53
Total length:					4:44

== Reception ==
=== Viewership ===
Behind Your Touch : South Korea viewers per episode (millions)

Season	Episode number																Average
Season	1	2	3	4	5	6	7	8	9	10	11	12	13	14	15	16	Average
1	1.288	1.475	1.348	1.603	1.194	1.706	1.306	1.646	1.556	1.942	1.840	2.030	1.597	2.254	1.671	2.328	1.674

Source: Audience measurement performed nationwide by Nielsen Korea.

Average TV viewership ratings
Ep.	Original broadcast date	Average audience share (Nielsen Korea)	
Ep.	Original broadcast date	Nationwide	Seoul
1	August 12, 2023	5.275% (2nd)	5.610% (2nd)
2	August 13, 2023	5.805% (3rd)	6.210% (3rd)
3	August 19, 2023	5.522% (1st)	5.676% (1st)
4	August 20, 2023	7.000% (1st)	7.310% (1st)
5	August 26, 2023	5.634% (1st)	5.978% (1st)
6	August 27, 2023	7.475% (1st)	7.460% (1st)
7	September 2, 2023	5.513% (1st)	5.702% (1st)
8	September 3, 2023	6.956% (1st)	7.163% (1st)
9	September 9, 2023	6.639% (1st)	7.095% (1st)
10	September 10, 2023	8.065% (1st)	8.134% (1st)
11	September 16, 2023	7.950% (1st)	8.423% (1st)
12	September 17, 2023	8.685% (1st)	9.359% (1st)
13	September 23, 2023	7.057% (1st)	7.517% (1st)
14	September 24, 2023	9.618% (1st)	10.413% (1st)
15	September 30, 2023	6.413% (1st)	7.050% (1st)
16	October 1, 2023	9.299% (1st)	9.250% (1st)
Average		7.057%	7.397%
In the table above, the blue numbers represent the lowest ratings and the red numbers represent the highest ratings.; This series airs on a cable channel/pay TV which normally has a relatively smaller audience compared to free-to-air TV/public broadcasters (KBS, SBS, MBC and EBS).

=== Accolades ===
Name of the award ceremony, year presented, category, nominee of the award, and the result of the nomination
Award ceremony	Year	Category	Nominee / Work	Result	Ref.
Baeksang Arts Awards	2024	Best Supporting Actress	Joo Min-kyung	Nominated	
