= Lingering (film) =

- Korean theatrical release poster
- Hangul: 호텔 레이크
- RR: Hotel reikeu
- MR: Hot'el reik'ŭ
- Directed by: Yoon Eun-gyeong
- Written by: Yoon Eun-gyeong
- Produced by: Kim Tae-hun
- Starring: Lee Se-young; Park Ji-young; Park Hyo-joo; Park So-yi; Jeon Su-ji; Kim Ju-won
- Cinematography: Hyeong-bin Lee
- Edited by: In-Dae Moon
- Music by: Kim Tae-seong
- Distributed by: Shudder
- Release date: April 29, 2020 (South Korea)
- Running time: 101 minutes
- Country: South Korea
- Language: Korean

Lingering (Korean: 호텔 레이크) is a 2020 South Korean supernatural horror film written and directed by Yoon Eun-gyeong.

== Plot ==
Yoo-mi's father died many years ago. Since then, she and her younger step sister have lived with their widowed mother in a tiny house that they inherited. But soon the poor family suffers a new loss: their mother dies under tragic circumstances, and now Yoo-mi has to take care of her younger sister. Yoo-mi decides to take the girl to the best friend of their deceased parents. The old friend owns a cozy hotel by the lake, and the girls visited the place in their childhood to enjoy the pristine nature. But, arriving at the hotel, Yoo-mi begins to suffer from a bad feeling and decides to stay overnight. Next morning, the younger sister disappears without a trace. Now, the older sister has to find her.

== Reception ==
Lindsay Traves of CGMagazine wrote, "Though Lingering has a few too many rising actions to feel focused, it's ultimately a beautiful film. It does well with the Korean horror tradition of family focused stories and fear arising from familial relationships. The appearance of the simple scenes is certainly it's strength in the creation of scares". Don Anelli of Asian Movie Pulse stated, "Overall, "Lingering" manages to get quite a lot right. One of its better aspects is director Yoon-een's ability to offer up a heartwarming story at the center between Yoo-mi and Ji-yoo. Doing the journey as a favor for her friend, the bond that develops, as a result, is impressively handled. Yoon-een makes it so it's quite possible to believe they are related through the interactions and protective nature that forms here..Once we're aware of the protective and motherly focus at the center of the film, the slow emergence of the horror elements towards Ji-yoo become all the more frightening."

== Cast ==
- Lee Se-young as Yoo-mi
- Park Ji-young as Gyeong-seon
- Park So-yi as Yoon Ji-yoo
- Seo Yeong-ju as Sang-woo
- Jeon Su-ji as Choi Yoon-hee
