= Rikidōzan (film) =

2004 film by Song Hae-seong

- Movie poster
- Hangul: 역도산
- Hanja: 力道山
- RR: Yeokdosan
- MR: Yŏktosan
- Directed by: Song Hae-sung
- Written by: Song Hae-sung
- Produced by: Kim Sun-ah; Haruo Umekawa
- Starring: Sul Kyung-gu; Miki Nakatani; Tatsuya Fuji; Masato Hagiwara; Masakatsu Funaki
- Cinematography: Kim Hyung-koo
- Edited by: Park Gok-ji
- Music by: Lee Jae-jin
- Production companies: Sidus Pictures; CJ Entertainment
- Distributed by: CJ Entertainment (South Korea); Sony Pictures Releasing (Japan)
- Release date: December 6, 2004
- Running time: 137 minutes
- Countries: South Korea; Japan
- Languages: Japanese; Korean

Rikidōzan (Korean: 역도산; RR: Yeokdosan) is a 2004 South Korean-Japanese biographical drama film written and directed by Song Hae-sung. The film is based on the life of Rikidōzan, a legendary ethnic Korean professional wrestler who became a national hero in Japan in the 1950s. It stars Sul Kyung-gu in the title role, with Miki Nakatani, Tatsuya Fuji, and actual Japanese wrestlers Keiji Mutoh and Masakatsu Funaki in the cast.

== Cast ==
- Rikidōzan/Kim Sin-rak: Sul Kyung-gu
- Aya: Miki Nakatani
- Yuzuru Yoshimachi: Masato Hagiwara
- Keiko Oki: Sawa Suzuki
- Kōichi Kasai: Tarō Yamamoto
- Masahiko Kimura: Masakatsu Funaki†
- Kim Myon-gil: Park Chul-min
- Kim Il: No Jun-ho
- Kōkichi Endō: Jun Akiyama†
- Toyonobori: Muhammad Yone†
- Harold Sakata: Keiji Mutoh†
- Azumanami: Shinya Hashimoto†
- Ben Sharpe: Mike Polchlopek†
- Mike Sharpe: Jim Steele†
- Mr. Atomic (Clyde Steeves): Rick Steiner†
- Wrestler: Makoto Hashi†
- Wrestler: Go Shiozaki†
- Wrestler: Koji Yoshida
- Wrestler: Chikara Momota
- Announcer: Shigeru Kajiwara
- Interviewer: Masami Ogishima
- NTV President: Shinji Nomura
- Nishonoyama Oyakata: Kazuyuki Senba
- Kenichi Tamura: Munenori Iwamoto
- New Havana Club M.C.: Magy
- Middle-Aged Woman: Rei Okamoto
- Takeo Kanno: Tatsuya Fuji

†denotes an actual professional wrestler

== Reception ==
Sol Kyung-gu gained 20 kilograms (44 lbs.) for the role and also delivered 95% of his lines in Japanese. Despite winning great praise for his performance, however, the film vastly underperformed in the box office on its local release, with total admissions at 1,249,794.

Nevertheless, Rikidozan was recognized at the 42nd Grand Bell Awards, winning Best Director for Song Hae-sung, and Best Cinematography for Kim Hyung-koo.
