= Tazza =

Tazza may refer to:

- Tazza (cup), a wide shallow cup or bowl, usually on a tall stem
- Tajja, a South Korean manhwa (타짜), also transliterated as Tazza
  - Tazza (TV series), a 2008 South Korean television series based on the manhwa
  - Tazza: The High Rollers, a 2006 South Korean film based on the manhwa
  - Tazza: The Hidden Card, a 2014 South Korean film based on the manhwa
  - Tazza: One Eyed Jack, a 2019 South Korean film based on the manhwa

== See also ==
- Farnese Cup, an example of a tazza vessel
- Aldobrandini Tazze, a set of 12 silver-gilt 16th-century tazze
- Tazza d'Oro (Pittsburgh), a cafe in Pittsburgh
- Donato Sbarretti (1856–1939), Roman Catholic Cardinal
