= Tazza: The Song of Beelzebub =

- Theatrical release poster
- Hangul: 타짜: 벨제붑의 노래
- RR: Tajja: Beljebubui norae
- MR: T'atcha: Peljebubŭi norae
- Directed by: Choi Kook-hee
- Written by: Choi Kook-hee; Kim Hyun
- Based on: Tajja by: Huh Young-man; Kim Se-yeong
- Produced by: Lee Han-dae
- Starring: Byun Yo-han; Roh Jae-won; Ayaka Miyoshi; Jo Woo-jin; Yoon Kyung-ho
- Cinematography: Lee Sung-jae
- Edited by: Yang Jin-mo
- Music by: Hwang Sang-jun
- Production company: Sidus Pictures
- Distributed by: CJ Entertainment
- Release date: September 23, 2026
- Running time: 129 minutes
- Country: South Korea
- Language: Korean
- Box office: $15.7 million

Tazza: The Song of Beelzebub (Korean: 타짜: 벨제붑의 노래) is a 2026 South Korean crime film directed by Choi Kook-hee and starring Byun Yo-han, Roh Jae-won, Ayaka Miyoshi, Jo Woo-jin, and Yoon Kyung-ho.

Based on Huh Young-man and Kim Se-yeong's Tajja manhwa series, the film is the fourth and final installment in the Tazza film series, following Tazza: One Eyed Jack (2019). Unlike the previous three films, it follows an independent storyline focusing on the friendship, jealousy, betrayal and rivalry between two men who share the same given name.

The film was released theatrically in South Korea on September 23, 2026.

== Synopsis ==
Jang Tae-young and Park Tae-young have been close friends since their school days. They enter the online casino business together and achieve considerable success, but Park becomes increasingly jealous of Jang, whose natural instincts and luck repeatedly place him at the center of attention.

Park eventually betrays Jang and takes everything from him. After surviving his downfall, Jang resolves to take revenge and learns poker from legendary gambler Kwak Dong-wook. The former friends eventually face each other again in a high-stakes international gambling game.

== Cast ==
- Byun Yo-han as Jang Tae-young, a naturally instinctive gambler who succeeds in the online casino business before being betrayed by his friend Park Tae-young
- Roh Jae-won as Park Tae-young, Jang's longtime friend and business partner who becomes increasingly obsessed with surpassing him
- Ayaka Miyoshi as Kaneko, an executive of a company backed by a yakuza organization who becomes involved in Jang and Park's poker business
- Jo Woo-jin as Kwak Dong-wook, a legendary gambler who teaches Jang poker
- Yoon Kyung-ho as Jo Jung-hwan, a man Jang encounters after his downfall
- Kim Min-ho as Hama, a longtime friend of Jang and Park
- Im Se-mi as Jang Tae-hee, Jang Tae-young's older sister
- Moon Ji-hoon as Abraham, a contract killer

== Production ==
In December 2025, Byun Yo-han, Roh Jae-won and Ayaka Miyoshi were announced as members of the principal cast. The film had begun principal photography in September 2025 under the direction of Choi Kook-hee, known for Default (2018).

The film changes the primary gambling game of the series from Korean card games to Texas hold 'em. Choi said the film differs from the earlier installments by focusing more heavily on human emotions including envy, jealousy and betrayal. Byun trained with professional hold'em players in preparation for his role, learning gameplay, psychological tactics and card-handling techniques.

The fourth film also has a storyline independent of the characters and events of the previous three installments. Byun stated that viewers could follow the film without having seen its predecessors.

== Release ==
In July 2026, it was announced that Tazza: The Song of Beelzebub would be released in September as the fourth and final film of the series. Its South Korean theatrical release date was later confirmed as September 23, 2026, ahead of the Chuseok holiday.

Like it's predecessors, the film received a rating of restricted to audiences aged 19 and over in South Korea.
