= Sikgaek =

Sikgaek (Korean: 식객; Hanja: 食客) may refer to:

- Sikgaek (manhwa), 2002 South Korean serialized manhwa (comic)
- Le Grand Chef, 2007 film adaptation
- Gourmet (TV series), 2008 TV adaptation

== See also ==
- Le Grand Chef 2: Kimchi Battle, 2010 film
