= Tazza: One Eyed Jack =

2019 film by Kwon Oh-kwang

- Theatrical release poster
- Hangul: 타짜: 원 아이드 잭
- RR: Tajja: won aideu Jaek
- MR: T'atcha: wŏn aidŭ Chaek
- Directed by: Kwon Oh-kwang
- Screenplay by: Kwon Oh-kwang
- Based on: Tajja by Huh Young-man and Kim Se-yeong
- Produced by: Kim Young-min; Kim Yoo-kyung
- Starring: Park Jeong-min; Ryoo Seung-bum; Choi Yu-hwa; Woo Hyun; Lee Kwang-soo; Yoon Je-moon; Lim Ji-yeon; Kwon Hae-hyo
- Cinematography: Byun Bong-sun
- Edited by: Kim Woo-il
- Music by: Bang Jun-seok
- Production companies: Sidus Corporation; BA Entertainment; MCMC
- Distributed by: Lotte Entertainment
- Release date: September 11, 2019
- Running time: 139 minutes
- Country: South Korea
- Language: Korean
- Budget: ₩8.9–11 billion
- Box office: US$16.5 million

Tazza: One Eyed Jack is a 2019 South Korean crime film directed by Kwon Oh-kwang based on Huh Young-man and Kim Se-yeong's manhwa of the same name. Starring Park Jeong-min, Ryoo Seung-bum, Choi Yu-hwa, Woo Hyun, Lee Kwang-soo, Yoon Je-moon, Lim Ji-yeon, and Kwon Hae-hyo, it serves as a sequel to Tazza: The High Rollers (2006) and Tazza: The Hidden Card (2014).

== Plot ==
Do Il-chul, a civil service exam student, is more interested in gambling than studying. At a poker hall, he meets a mysterious woman named Madonna, who dismisses his dreams of becoming a professional gambler. Il-chul insists he is a rising tazza (master gambler), but she abruptly leaves. Later, he spots her in a car that damages his bicycle. Il-chul challenges the car owner to a high-stakes poker match for compensation but loses badly and falls deep into debt.

When Il-chul is cornered by loan sharks, a mysterious gambler named "One-Eyed Jack" steps in and pays off his debt, claiming he owed a favor to Il-chul's late father, Jjak-gwi. Desperate to become a true tazza, Il-chul convinces Jack to take him in, on the condition that he can win at roulette. After succeeding, Il-chul joins Jack's team of gamblers, including Young-mi, Kka-chi, and Mr. Kwon, to scam a wealthy man known as Mool.

Things go awry when Il-chul encounters Madonna again, now linked to Mool. She claims her husband is dead and she has invested everything with Mool. Il-chul warns her to withdraw her money, and they share a passionate night together, but it is a trap. Il-chul is beaten by Mool's men, and the entire crew is in danger. Kka-chi sacrifices himself to help Young-mi and Mr. Kwon escape.

Jack saves Il-chul and confesses he once betrayed Jjak-gwi, Il-chul's father. Jack later confronts Mool's hired card shark, Ma-gwi, and loses his life. Traumatized and alone, Il-chul becomes a drifting gambler until a maimed Kka-chi reappears and tells him of Jack's death. Il-chul vows revenge and challenges Ma-gwi to a final game. Madonna, now revealed to have been colluding with Ma-gwi and Mool, tries to strike a deal with Il-chul, only to find she has already been outmaneuvered.

During the match, Ma-gwi falls into Il-chul's trap and loses. Realizing too late that Madonna betrayed him, Ma-gwi is dragged to a fish farm. Madonna, fueled by revenge for her brother's murder, severs his arm and watches him drown. Though she gains nothing materially, she finds closure and walks away.

Il-chul splits the winnings as promised with Mool, but Mool attempts to kill him to keep the money. However, Il-chul had anticipated the betrayal and bribed Mool's driver, who turns on Mool and kills him. When Il-chul offers the driver more money, he declines, saying a true gambler knows when to walk away.

Il-chul shares his winnings with his old teammates and returns to studying. He passes the civil service exam and becomes a government employee. In the post-credits scene, he is pulled into another poker game by his colleagues, unable to quit gambling for good.

== Cast ==
- Park Jeong-min as Do Il-chul, son of Jjak-gwi (One ear of Gyeongsang Province), one of the top 3 gamblers mentioned in Tazza: The High Rollers
- Ryoo Seung-bum as One-Eyed Jack
- Choi Yu-hwa as Madonna
- Woo Hyun as Mool
- Yoon Je-moon as Ma-gwi
- Lee Kwang-soo as Jo Kka-chi
- Lim Ji-yeon as Young-mi
- Kwon Hae-hyo as Mr. Kwon
- Lee Chang-hoon as Il-ta
- Oh Hye-won as Bartender
- Oh Dong-min as Cross-eyed
- Lee Hong-nae as a bodyguard

== Production ==
Principal photography began on September 12, 2018, and wrapped on February 2, 2019.
