= No Way Out: The Roulette =

2024 South Korean television series

- Promotional poster
- Hangul: 노 웨이 아웃: 더 룰렛
- RR: No wei aut: deo rullet
- MR: No wei aut: tŏ rullet
- Genre: Mystery; Thriller
- Written by: Lee Soo-jin
- Directed by: Choi Kook-hee; Lee Hoo-bin
- Starring: Cho Jin-woong; Yoo Jae-myung; Kim Mu-yeol; Yum Jung-ah; Sung Yoo-bin; Greg Hsu; Lee Kwang-soo; Kim Sung-cheol
- Music by: Hong Dae-sung
- Country of origin: South Korea
- Original language: Korean
- No. of episodes: 8

Production
- Executive producers: Seo Kang-ho; Lee Jung-woo
- Producer: Kim Min-joon
- Cinematography: Seo Dong-ki
- Editor: Lee Kang-hee
- Production companies: Twin Film; Studio X+U; Jerry Good Company; Plus M Entertainment

Original release
- Network: U+ Mobile TV
- Release: July 31 – August 21, 2024

No Way Out: The Roulette (Korean: 노 웨이 아웃: 더 룰렛) is a 2024 South Korean mystery thriller television series written by Lee Soo-jin, co-directed by Choi Kook-hee and Lee Hoo-bin, and starring Cho Jin-woong, Yoo Jae-myung, Kim Mu-yeol, Yum Jung-ah, Sung Yoo-bin, Greg Hsu, Lee Kwang-soo, and Kim Sung-cheol. The series is about an open murder contract with a bounty of 20 billion won on the life of a rare heinous criminal and the fierce battle between those who want to kill and those who want to survive. It was released on U+ Mobile TV from July 31, to August 21, 2024. It is also available for streaming on Disney+ in selected regions.

== Synopsis ==
No Way Out: The Roulette is about a police officer who is forced to protect a criminal in an ironic situation, a murderer released from prison after 13 years with a bounty on his head, a lawyer who becomes a criminal's legal representative in order to succeed, a mayor who uses criminals to save her political life, a son who lives with the stigma of being the child of a murderer, a killer who comes to Korea for pay, and a mysterious figure who puts a bounty on a criminal.

== Cast and characters ==
=== Main ===
- Cho Jin-woong as Baek Joong-sik

A police officer who is tasked with protecting a notorious criminal and finds himself in an ironic situation.

- Yoo Jae-myung as Kim Guk-ho

A notorious criminal who has been released from prison after 13 years and become a target by the entire nation with a bounty of 20 billion won on his head.

- Kim Mu-yeol as Lee Sang-bong

A lawyer and Guk-ho's legal representative.

- Yum Jung-ah as Ahn Myung-ja

the Mayor of Hosan who uses Guk-ho as her only hope in the face of the end of her political life.

- Sung Yoo-bin as Seo Dong-ha

Guk-ho's son who is a genius violinist but weighed down by the stigma of being the son of a murderer.

- Greg Hsu as Mr. Smile

A Taiwanese professional assassin who comes to South Korea to kill Guk-ho.

- Lee Kwang-soo as Yoon Chang-jae

A butcher who wants to kill Guk-ho in exchange of big money.

- Kim Sung-cheol as Sung Joon-woo

A young pastor who influences the congregation of a large church.

=== Supporting ===
- Choi Myung-bin as Baek So-mi

Joong-sik's daughter who was kidnapped by Chang-jae as a hostage to demand Joong-sik to hand Guk-ho over as ransom for her.

- Son Yeo-eun as Ye-eun

Joong-sik's wife and So-mi's mother.

- Oh Woo-ri as Park Eun-jeong

A policewoman who helps Joong-sik to find So-mi after she was kidnapped by Chang-jae.

- Park Hyung-soo as Koo Seok-hwan

A prosecutor.

- Heo Dong-won

== Production ==
=== Development ===
Director Choi Kook-hee, who directed Default (2018) and Life Is Beautiful (2022), and writer Lee Soo-jin, who wrote The Devil's Deal (2021), team up for the series. This is Choi small screen directorial debut. It was developed under the working title Open Murder Contract (Korean: 공개살인청부; RR: Gonggaesarincheongbu). Studio X+U and Twin Film managed the production. They began to crank-in in October 2023.

=== Casting ===
In May 2023, Lee Sun-kyun was first offered for the lead role but later informed the production team of his intention to voluntarily leave the series because of his drug allegations.

In July 2023, Yoo Jae-myung, Kim Mu-yeol, and Lee Kwang-soo were reportedly cast for the series.

In August 2023, Lee Sun-kyun, Yoo Jae-myung, Kim Mu-yeol, and Lee Kwang-soo were officially confirmed to appear on the series. On the same month, Yum Jung-ah was reportedly offered to appear for the series.

In September 2023, Taiwanese actor Greg Hsu was reportedly cast for the series and this would make his first Korean drama appearance.

In October 2023, Cho Jin-woong was reportedly cast to replace Lee Sun-kyun's role due to Lee undergoing investigations over drug use allegations. A day later, Kim Sung-cheol was reportedly cast for the series.

Cho, Yoo, Kim M., Yum, Sung, Hsu, Lee, and Kim S. completed the main cast lineup of the series.

=== Filming ===
Principal photography took place from November 23, 2023, to March 31, 2024.

== Release ==
No Way Out: The Roulette was confirmed to be released on U+ Mobile TV on July 31, 2024. It was also confirmed that the series would simultaneously be released via Disney+.

== Reception ==
=== Critical response ===
Singapore's national newspaper The Straits Times gave The series a three out of five stars, praising the series for its packed and busy premise and the execution of the intriguing plot, as well as the portrayal of its characters. For Greg Hsu, the article described his K-drama debut as "memorable and stylish" and positively commented on the Taiwanese actor's acting and portrayal of a cold-blooded professional killer.

=== Accolades ===
Name of the award ceremony, year presented, category, nominee of the award, and the result of the nomination
Award ceremony	Year	Category	Nominee / Work	Result	Ref.
Asia Contents Awards & Global OTT Awards	2024	Best Lead Actor	Cho Jin-woong	Nominated	
Asia Contents Awards & Global OTT Awards	2024	Best Supporting Actor	Lee Kwang-soo	Nominated	
