= Tazza (TV series) =

2008 South Korean television series

- Promotional poster
- Also known as: War of Flowers
- Genre: Gambling; Drama; Romance
- Based on: Tajja by Huh Young-man
- Written by: Seol Joon-seok; Jin Heon-soo; Im Jung-ki
- Directed by: Kang Shin-hyo
- Starring: Jang Hyuk; Han Ye-seul; Kim Min-jun
- Music by: Choi Seung-kwon
- Country of origin: South Korea
- Original language: Korean
- No. of episodes: 21

Production
- Producer: Lee Hyun-jik
- Production location: Korea
- Running time: Mondays and Tuesdays at 21:55 (KST)
- Production companies: Olive9; DIMA Entertainment

Original release
- Network: SBS TV
- Release: September 16 – November 25, 2008

Related
- Tazza: The High Rollers; Tazza: The Hidden Card

Tazza (Korean: 타짜) is a 2008 South Korean television series starring Jang Hyuk, Han Ye-seul, Kim Min-jun, Kang Sung-yeon, Son Hyun-joo and Kim Kap-soo. It aired on SBS from September 16 to November 25, 2008 on Mondays and Tuesdays at 21:55 for 21 episodes.

The series is based on a manhwa of the same name by Huh Young-man and Kim Se-yeong, which was also made into the 2006 live-action film Tazza: The High Rollers.

== Plot ==
Goni (Jang Hyuk) hopes for a better life for his hard-working single mother (Park Soon-chun). He first turns to gambling to earn money to buy her a sewing machine, and encourages her to marry local photographer Dae-ho (Lee Ki-young). Goni is unaware that his stepfather was once a notorious swindler in Jirisan, and that his best friend Young-min (Kim Min-jun) is plotting against Dae-ho. Dae-ho is killed as a result of Young-min's actions, and Goni is framed for the crime. In prison, he learns the techniques of the card game hwatu, and after his release he sets out to gamble his way to the top and take revenge on Young-min and Young-min's uncle, Agwi (Kim Kap-soo), who orchestrated the plot.

== Cast ==
=== Main characters ===
- Jang Hyuk as Kim Goni
  - Yeo Jin-goo as young Goni
- Han Ye-seul as Lee Nan-sook / Mi-na
  - Lee Han-na as young Nan-sook
- Kim Min-jun as Young-min
- Kang Sung-yeon as Madam Jeong
- Son Hyun-joo as Go Kwang-ryeol
- Kim Kap-soo as Agwi

=== Supporting characters ===
- Im Hyun-sik as Pyeong Kyeong-jang
- Lee Ki-young as Kang Dae-ho, Goni's stepfather
- Park Soon-chun as Soon-im, Goni's mother
- Im Ji-kyu as Sung-chan
- Jang Won-young as Kye Dong-choon
- Oh Jung-se as Kwang-tae, Nan-sook's brother
- Kim Ji-young as Young-min's aunt
- Lee So-jung as Pyeong Yoo-ra
- Ahn Nae-sang as Myung-soo, Goni's father
- Kwon Tae-won as Bool-gom ("Brown Bear")
- Song Jong-ho as Ahn Se-hoon
- Park Yong-soo as General Choi
- Shin Seung-hwan as Goni's friend
- Seo Dong-soo as Yong-pal
- Jo Sang-gu as Jjakgwi
- Baek Chan-ki as Chief priest Gam
- Bang Kil-seung as Doksa ("Viper")
- Kim Sung-hoon as Dong-choon's acting boss
- Kim Yang-woo as swindler
- Jeon Chang-gul as prison official

== Reception ==
The final episode recorded a rating of 18.4% according to TNS Media Korea, and the series averaged 14% across its 21 episodes according to AGB Nielsen, well ahead of its competitor on KBS2.

The series drew controversy for its sexual content and violence, and its viewing rating was raised to 19 and over during its run. Some in the broadcasting industry questioned whether its gambling subject matter was suitable for terrestrial television; Jang Hyuk responded that the series conveyed the message that gambling ruins lives.

== Awards ==
2008 SBS Drama Awards

- Excellence Award, Actor in a Special Planning Drama: Jang Hyuk
- Excellence Award, Actress in a Special Planning Drama: Han Ye-seul
- Excellence Award, Supporting Actor in a Special Planning Drama: Son Hyun-joo
- Best Young Actor: Yeo Jin-goo
- Top 10 Stars: Han Ye-seul, Jang Hyuk

== International broadcast ==
- It aired in Vietnam from August 5, 2009 on HTV3, under the title Canh bạc nghiệt ngã.
