= Story of Wine =

- Film poster
- Directed by: Lee Cheol-ha
- Written by: Lee Cheol-ha; Nil Kwonji
- Produced by: Cha Seung-jae; Kim Mi-hee; Kim Hyo-jung
- Starring: Lee Ki-woo; Greena Park; No Min-woo; Seo Hyun-jin
- Cinematography: Kim Min
- Edited by: Lee Sang-koo; Lee Jin
- Music by: Choi Yong-rock; No Min-woo
- Production company: Sidus
- Distributed by: Sidus FnH
- Release date: November 13, 2008
- Running time: 96 minutes
- Country: South Korea
- Language: Korean

Story of Wine (Korean: 스토리 오브 와인; RR: Seutori obeu wain) is a 2008 South Korean romantic drama film directed by Lee Cheol-ha and starring Lee Ki-woo. It is Korea's first interactive movie.

== Plot ==
At the one year anniversary party for the wine bar Story of Wine, Min-sung made an exclusive wine list specifically paired with a unique story that represents the qualities of each wine. Every bottle has a story: with love, lost, and friendship.

== Cast ==
- Lee Ki-woo as Min-sung
- Greena Park as Hwa-yeon
- Marcos Benjamin Lee as Hyuk-jun
- Seo Hyun-jin as Jin-ju
- No Min-woo as Taek-jin

== Film festivals ==
1. Official Selection - 12th Sonoma Valley Film Festival 2009
2. Official Closing Night Film - 2nd Philadelphia Asian American Film Festival 2009
3. Official Selection - The IXth WT Os International Film Festival 2009
