= S Line (TV series) =

2025 South Korean television series

- Official series poster
- Genre: Fantasy; Thriller
- Based on: S Line by kkomabi
- Written by: Ahn Joo-young
- Directed by: Ahn Joo-young
- Starring: Lee Soo-hyuk; Arin; Lee Da-hee; Lee Eun-saem; Kim Dong-young
- Theme music composer: Lee Jun-oh
- Opening theme: Park Ye-ni – "Between The Lines"
- Country of origin: South Korea
- Original language: Korean
- No. of episodes: 6

Production
- Executive producer: Handae Rhee
- Production company: Sidus Pictures

Original release
- Network: Wavve
- Release: July 11 – July 25, 2025

S Line (Korean: S라인; stylized as Social. Sex. Secrets.: The S–Lines) is a South Korean dark fantasy crime thriller television series released on Wavve from July 11, to July 25, 2025. The series is based on the original Naver webtoon of the same name by kkomabi and was written and directed by Ahn Joo-young. It stars Lee Soo-hyuk, Lee Da-hee, Arin, Lee Eun-saem, and Kim Dong-young. The drama was invited to compete at the 8th edition of Canneseries.

== Synopsis ==
Set in the near future, where people's past sexual relationships are visually linked by a glowing red “S Line” visible above their heads. A detective, a mysterious teacher, and a girl born with the ability to see these lines navigate a series of disturbing events triggered by the phenomenon.

== Cast ==
=== Main ===
- Lee Soo-hyuk as Han Ji-wook – A free-spirited and handsome detective assigned to a bizarre death case tied to the “S Line”. After wearing special glasses, he’s shocked to see dozens of red lines crisscrossing over his head and resolves to uncover the mystery.
- Arin as Shin Hyun-heup – The only person naturally born with the ability to see the “S Lines”.
- Lee Da-hee as Lee Gyu-jin – A mysterious high school teacher whose calm demeanor hides eerie smiles and secrets.
- Jang Sun as Hyun-heup’s mother – Learns of her husband's affair with her sister after seeing her daughter's S-Line drawings.
- Kim Dong-young as Oh Dong-sik – Ji-wook’s junior and assistant detective.
- Lee Eun-saem as Kang Seon-ah – Ji-wook’s niece and Hyun-heup’s classmate.
- Lee Kwang-hee as Joon-seon – Hyun-heup’s classmate and class president who secretly likes her.
- Oh Woo-ri as Lee Kyung-jin – A fellow student at Hyun-heup’s school.
- Lee Han-joo as Yoon Ji-na – A K-pop trainee attending the same high school.
- Nam Kyu-hee as Kim Hye-young – A classmate who bullies Seon-ah.
- Kim So-young as Choi I-seo – Another bully.
- Park Sung-il as Bang Seong-jin – Korean teacher who has an affair with student Hye-young.
- Woo Ji-hyun as Jung-woo – High school teacher who discovers his fiancée is cheating with a friend.
- Lee Ka-seop as Oh Jung-min – A serial killer with a history of relationship violence, formerly a math teacher.
- Park Ye-ni as Hee-won – Jung-min’s ex and Hyun-heup’s new neighbor.
- Jung Jae-kwang as Bartender – Questioned by Ji-wook while investigating Jung-min.

== Episodes ==
No. overall	No. in season	Title	Directed by	Written by	Original release date	
1	1	"The S-Lines"	Ahn Joo-young	Ahn Joo-young	July 11, 2025	7.2
Hyun-heup, a high school girl, can see mysterious red “S Lines” connecting people who have had sexual encounters. After receiving special glasses, she begins seeing these lines more vividly, which changes how she views her classmates and herself.
2	2	"Animal Kingdom"	Ahn Joo-young	Ahn Joo-young	July 11, 2025	7.4
As Hyun-heup adjusts to her ability, she notices troubling patterns and social dynamics at her school. Meanwhile, a mysterious incident hints at darker forces tied to the S Lines.
3	3	"Girl with Sunglasses"	Ahn Joo-young	Ahn Joo-young	July 18, 2025	7.6
Hyun-heup investigates the history of the red lines and learns of a tragic past involving another girl who saw them. Sunglasses become a symbol of power—and danger.
4	4	"In between two lines"	Ahn Joo-young	Ahn Joo-young	July 18, 2025	7.7
As romantic and sexual tensions rise in school, Hyun-heup sees a tangled web of red lines—and faces a decision about whether to act on her feelings or avoid them.
5	5	"The Bloody Destiny"	Ahn Joo-young	Ahn Joo-young	July 25, 2025	–
In the penultimate episode, Hyun-heup confronts Ji-wook about their mysterious connection. Meanwhile, the glasses fall into the wrong hands, causing chaos.
6	6	"The Last Word"	Ahn Joo-young	Ahn Joo-young	July 25, 2025	–
The story culminates in a dark revelation about the origin of the S Lines and Hyun-heup’s destiny. She must choose between accepting the truth or destroying the lines forever.

== Awards ==
Year	Award Ceremony	Category	Nominee	Result	Ref
2025	Canneseries	Best Music	Lee Jun-oh	Won	
