= Time to Hunt (film) =

2020 South Korean action thriller film

- Official release poster
- Hangul: 사냥의 시간
- RR: Sanyangui sigan
- MR: Sanyangŭi sigan
- Directed by: Yoon Sung-hyun
- Written by: Yoon Sung-hyun
- Produced by: Handae Rhee
- Starring: Lee Je-hoon; Ahn Jae-hong; Choi Woo-shik; Park Jung-min; Park Hae-soo
- Cinematography: Lim Won-geun
- Edited by: Yoon Sung-hyun; Wang Sung-ik
- Music by: Primary
- Production company: Sidus Pictures
- Distributed by: Netflix
- Release dates: February 22, 2020 (Berlinale); April 23, 2020 (Netflix)
- Running time: 134 minutes
- Country: South Korea
- Language: Korean

Time to Hunt (Korean: 사냥의 시간; RR: Sanyangui sigan) is a 2020 South Korean dystopian action thriller film written and directed by Yoon Sung-hyun. It was released worldwide on April 23, 2020 by Netflix. Set in a dystopian South Korea, the film follows a group of friends who plot a heist and find themselves hunted down by a mysterious assassin after accomplishing the mission.

The film premiered at the 70th Berlin International Film Festival on February 22, 2020, making it the first South Korean film to be screened in the Berlinale Special section.

== Plot ==
In dystopian South Korea, Jun-seok gets released from prison, having been incarcerated after a botched heist he and his friends pulled. The South Korean won has crashed massively, making their haul effectively worthless. Jun-seok proposes one last heist to his best friends Jang-ho and Ki-hoon to escape their miserable situations. Their target is an illegal gambling house, which stores hefty stacks of US dollars. The trio recruits Sang-soo, an employee working there. After getting firearms from Bong-sik – Jun-seok's contact – the quartet proceeds with the heist. Despite the messy proceedings, the heist is ultimately successful. They take a large sum of cash and the gambling house's surveillance hard drives.

After Sang-soo chooses to continue working for a while to avoid raising suspicions, the remaining three leaves to go to Ki-hoon's parents' home. Unbeknownst to the group, the hard drives contain footage of shady dealings between the gambling house's owners and various criminals. The gambling house owner hires police officer-turned-contract killer Han to retrieve the drives. Han visits Bong-sik, forces him to call Jun-seok to reveal the trio's current location, and kills him. Han kills Sang-soo off-screen and takes his phone. Jun-seok wakes up from a nightmare and goes to a bar. He receives several calls from Sang-soo's phone. Realising that someone else has the phone, he meets up with Jang-ho and Ki-hoon and urges them to flee. As the trio leaves the parking lot, Han shoots Jang-ho, causing their car to crash. Han gives them a 5-minute headstart to prolong the hunt.

They drive to the hospital in another city to treat Jang-ho's injury. Using the city's surveillance system, Han finds the hospital. Jun-seok sees him coming. The trio evades Han and escapes in his car, in the process realizing him to be a police officer. They attempt to make a deal with him, but he refuses. Han is arrested by the police, but they release him under the police chief's orders. The trio arrives at the harbor, where they have to stay until dawn. Suspecting that his parents are in trouble, Ki-hoon returns to his parents' home. Jun-seok returns at dusk, sees an unknown car near the entrance, and realises that Han has arrived. Jun-seok and Jang-ho escape from Han and run to a nearby car, but Han shoots at them before Jang-ho can start the car. Jun-seok says fighting Han is their only chance to escape.

In the ensuing gunfight, Han shoots Jang-ho multiple times, and the latter eventually succumbs to his injuries and dies. As Jun-seok is about to be killed by Han, a group of masked men, led by Bong-sik's brother Bong-soo, arrives to kill Han. The masked men shoot Han numerous times, and he falls into the sea. At dawn, Jun-seok takes the boat to Kenting, Taiwan. His contacts inform him that Han has survived, and although Jun-seok chooses not to inquire after Ki-hoon, it is implied that Ki-hoon died after returning home. Deciding he would never be free by running, Jun-seok trains and arms himself, and returns to South Korea to face Han once and for all.

== Cast ==
=== Main ===
- Lee Je-hoon as Jun-seok
- Ahn Jae-hong as Jang-ho
- Choi Woo-shik as Ki-hoon
- Park Jung-min as Sang-soo
- Park Hae-soo as Han

=== Special appearances ===
- Jo Sung-ha as Bong-sik / Bong-soo (dual role)
- Kim Won-hae as Bin-dae
- Lee Hang-na as Ki-hoon's mother

== Production ==
Principal photography began in January 2018 and filming was completed on July 15, 2018. Filming mostly took place in Incheon.

== Release ==
The film was originally set to be released in theaters on February 26, 2020, but it was postponed indefinitely due to the COVID-19 pandemic. On March 23, it was announced that Netflix would release the film on April 10.

=== Legal dispute ===
Following the announcement that Time to Hunt would be released on Netflix, the film's then-international sales agency Contents Panda (Note: A subsidiary of Next Entertainment World (NEW), one of Little Big Pictures' bigger rivals) filed an injunction against Little Big Pictures (distributor of the film) as they "unilaterally notified [Contents Panda] of the termination of the contract" and "none of the overseas distributors agreed on an exclusive distribution agreement with Netflix."

As of April 8, 2020 Netflix announced the release date has been postponed to comply with the Seoul Central District Court ruling regarding distribution contracts, and no further info for a possible release date was given.

On April 16, 2020 the parties agreed to a compensation deal with distributors and the Court injunction was lifted. On April 20, Netflix announced that the film would be released three days later.

== Reception ==
=== Critical response ===
On the review aggregation website Rotten Tomatoes, the film holds an approval rating of 69% based on 16 reviews, with an average rating of 6.7/10.

Deborah Young of The Hollywood Reporter describes it as "a technical tour-de-force running over two hours [which] belongs both to the East Asian testosterone-powered action genre whose unrelenting tension will be reward in itself for fans, as well as to socially conscious coming-of-age stories whose painstaking character development adds a deeper sense of realism."

=== Accolades ===
Year	Award	Category	Recipient(s)	Result	Ref.
2020	56th Baeksang Arts Awards	Best Actor	Lee Je-hoon	Nominated	
2020	56th Baeksang Arts Awards	Best New Actor	Park Hae-soo	Nominated	
2020	14th Asian Film Awards	Best Cinematography	Lim Won-geun	Nominated	
