= Greena Park =

South Korean actress (born 1985)

- Born: January 8, 1985 (age 41); Seoul, South Korea
- Education: Dongduk Women's University
- Occupation: Actress
- Years active: 2003–present
- Agent: Y ONE Entertainment Korea

Korean name
- Hangul: 박그리나
- RR: Bak Geurina
- MR: Pak Kŭrina

Greena Park (Korean: 박그리나; born January 8, 1985) is a South Korean actress. Park debuted in the film The Ghost (2004). She has played a variety of characters and roles, including the cafe waitress Hee-young in BABO (2008), the tom·boy Soon-nam in Once Upon a Time in Seoul (2008), and the female cop Lee Min-jae in the television series Lucifer (2007).

== Filmography ==
=== Film ===
Year	Title	Role
2004	Dead Friend	Yu-jung's friend
2004	Flying Boys	Seung-eon
2005	Rules of Dating	Hee-jung
2008	BA:BO	Hee-young
2008	Once Upon a Time in Seoul	Soon-nam
2008	Story of Wine	Hwa-yeon
2011	The Way Back	Ji-soo
2013	District 820	Kwon Jin-kyung
2014	My Ordinary Love Story	So-young
2017	Angeltown	Lola
2021	All Sorts	June

=== Television series ===
Year	Title	Role	Network
2005	Lawyers	Min-ji	MBC
2005	Drama City: "Shi-eun & Soo-ha"	Soo-ha	KBS2
2007	Lucifer	Lee Min-jae	KBS2
2007	Belle	Oh Ji-sook	KBS1
2010	KBS Drama Special: "Reason"	Park Song-yi	KBS2
2010	The King of Legend	Dan Dan-yi	KBS1
2011	Special Affairs Team TEN	Hyun-kyung (episode 10)	OCN
2012	Quiz of God 3	Yoo-kyung (guest, episode 5)	OCN
2012	Dream of the Emperor	Gotaso	KBS1
2013	Nine	Lee Joo-hee	tvN
2013	The Fugitive of Joseon	Song-hwa	KBS2
2013	Can't Stand Anymore	Oh Seung-ri	jTBC
2013	Two Weeks	Woman in labor (cameo, episode 5)	MBC
