= Love Me Not =

- Movie poster for Love Me Not
- Hangul: 사랑따윈 필요없어
- Hanja: 사랑따윈 必要없어
- RR: Sarangttawin piryoeopseo
- MR: Sarangttawin p'iryoŏpsŏ
- Directed by: Lee Cheol-ha
- Written by: Kim Jae-yeon; Kim Seon-jeong; Lee Cheol-ha
- Based on: Forget Love by Yukari Tatsui
- Produced by: Cha Seung-jae; Kim Mi-hee
- Starring: Moon Geun-young; Kim Joo-hyuk; Lee Ki-young; Jin Goo; Seo Hyun-jin
- Cinematography: Kang Chang-bae
- Edited by: Moon In-Dae
- Music by: Tekn Kim
- Production companies: Sidus Pictures; Cineclick Asia; IM Pictures; CJ Entertainment
- Distributed by: Showbox
- Release date: November 9, 2006 (South Korea)
- Running time: 118 minutes
- Country: South Korea
- Language: Korean
- Budget: US$4 million
- Box office: US$2,438,783

Love Me Not (Korean: 사랑따윈 필요없어, lit. "Love and Such Is Not Necessary") is a 2006 South Korean romance film directed by Lee Cheol-ha and starring Moon Geun-young and Kim Joo-hyuk.

It is based on the 2002 TBS Japanese drama Forget Love (愛なんていらねえよ、夏, Ai nante Irane yo, Natsu), starring Ryōko Hirosue. The 2013 South Korean television series That Winter, the Wind Blows is also based on the same storyline.

== Plot ==
Julian (Kim Joohyuk) has lived off with the money he lures from his rich female customers. But now he faces usurious debts from a hasty expansion of his business, and he will be killed unless he clears the debt in one month. The only way to save himself is to pretend to be the long-lost brother of an heiress and kill her to get her huge fortune. Min (Moon Geun-young), the blind cold-hearted heiress likes Julian, she slowly opens herself to him, and he, too, falls for her. But Julian has to pay his creditor and what makes it worse for him is that the illness that took Min's eyesight relapsed, threatening her life. This story takes a terrible turn when Julian becomes guilty, and pained with guilt.

== Reception ==
The film had 548,998 admissions and earned US$2,438,783.

== Awards and nominations ==
2007 Grand Bell Awards

- Nomination – Best Actress - Moon Geun-young
- Nomination – Best Art Direction - Jang Jae-jin
- Nomination – Best Costume Design - Chae Kyung-hwa

== Soundtrack ==
1. Sunshine (Orgol Version)
2. Julian
3. Adonis Club I
4. Memoris
5. Love Theme
6. I Believe In You (庭園)
7. Min
8. Sunshine (Clarinet Version)
9. Julian's Tears
10. Tell Me The Truth
11. Your Picture
12. Secret
13. Last Dinner
14. Adonis Club Ii
15. Destiny
16. The Shadow Of Love
17. Never End
18. Sunshine (sung by BoA)
19. (Bonus Track) He Says
20. (Bonus Track) She Says
21. (Bonus Track) Sunshine (Instrumental)
