= Lee Cheol-ha =

South Korean film director (born 1970)

- Born: September 12, 1970 (age 56); Seoul, South Korea
- Occupations: Film director, screenwriter

Korean name
- Hangul: 이철하
- Hanja: 李澈河
- RR: I Cheolha
- MR: I Ch'ŏrha
- Website: http://www.hfilm.co.kr

Lee Cheol-ha (Korean: 이철하) is a South Korean film director known for his stylish portraits of the human experience.

Born in South Korea, Lee was raised in Seoul. He eschewed the film school route, doing other hands-on work for commercial film productions. He next got a job at Sidus FNH in 1999 with his first screen credit being for Il Mare as an assistant director. He left Korea to study a film at Academy of Art University in California. One of his short film won 1st place at the College Emmy Awards.

After he graduated at Academy of Art University, he came back to Korea and direct commercials and music videos. This quickly brought Lee to the attention of producers in Korea and he got the chance to direct a feature film. Though he would continue to direct spots for companies like GM Daewoo Motors, Pantech Curitel, CIGNA, Global Gillette, Innostream and Orion Confectionery, Lee Cheol-ha soon discovered that the slightly expanded format of music videos was an even better place to try things out.

With his sights set on a directing career, he made a video-production company H Films and started off directing music videos and commercials. Lee directed music videos for artists such as BoA, TVXQ, Kangta, Shinhwa, S.E.S., Jaurim, Fly to the Sky, S and g.o.d, as well as commercials. Like a number of other music video directors, he then moved into film.

Lee Cheol-ha's feature debut was Love Me Not (2006), which was then the most expensive picture ever made by a first time director. Unfortunately the film was not a pleasant experience for him, having had a bad critic with the people at Korea film industry. While it received Grand Bell Awards nominations for Art Direction, Costume Design and Best Leading Actress, the film was not well received by critics or movie goers.

== Filmography ==
- The Toothbrush (1997)
- Teensmoker (1998)
- O[ou] (1999)
- My Tear (1999)
- Like (2000)
- Love Me Not (2006)
- Story of Wine (2008)
- Stray Cats (2009)
- Pricked Grape Prince (2009)
- Meet (2010)
- Pyega (2010)
- Hello?! Orchestra (2013)
- I eat therefore I am (2015)
- Insane (2016)
- Okay! Madam (2020)
- Unlock My Boss (2022)
- Spirit Fingers! (2025)
- Okay! Madam 2 (2026)
- Bluehouse (TBA)

== Awards ==
- ATAS Foundation College Television Awards 1999 (1st Place) - The Confessional (1999)
- ATAS Foundation College Television Awards 2000 (3rd Place) - O[ou] (1999)
- 12th Sonoma International Film Festival 2009 (Official Selection) - Story of Wine (2009)
