= Split (2016 South Korean film) =

Film by Choi Kook-hee

- Theatrical release poster
- Directed by: Choi Kook-hee
- Written by: Choi Kook-hee
- Produced by: Nam Sung-ho; Lee Tae-hyun
- Starring: Yoo Ji-tae; Lee Jung-hyun; Lee David; Jung Sung-hwa
- Cinematography: Baek Yoon-seuk
- Edited by: Kim Sun-min
- Music by: Choi Yong-rak
- Production company: Opus Pictures
- Distributed by: Opus Pictures
- Release date: November 9, 2016 (South Korea)
- Running time: 116 minutes
- Country: South Korea
- Language: Korean
- Box office: US$5.5 million

Split (Korean: 스플릿) is a 2016 South Korean sports film directed by Choi Kook-hee. It stars Yoo Ji-tae, Lee Jung-hyun, Lee David and Jung Sung-hwa.

== Plot ==
A man once considered a bowling legend teams up with an autistic genius bowling player and a bookmaker.

== Cast ==
- Yoo Ji-tae as Yoon Cheol-jong
- Lee Jung-hyun as Joo Hee-jin
- Lee David as Park Young-hoon
- Jung Sung-hwa as 'Toad' Doo Joong-oh
- Kwon Hae-hyo as President Baek
- Moon Young-soo as Grey-haired man
- Jang Hee-woong as Moo-kyung
- Kim Hye-na as Ms. Yoon
- Yang Dong-tak as Hunting cap
- Park Chul-min as Park Yoon-bae

== Awards and nominations ==
Year	Award	Category	Recipient	Result
2017	Fantasia International Film Festival	New Flesh Award for Best First Feature	Choi Kook-hee	Won
