= Yeongsimi =

- Created by: Bae Geum-taek
- Original work: Yeongsimi (1988-)
- Owner: Bae Geum-taek
- Years: 1988–present

Films and television
- Film(s): Young-Shim (1990)
- Animated series: TV Animated series

Yeongsimi or Young-sim is a South Korean comics serialized 1988 by South Korean cartoonist Bae Geum-taek, and it refers to an animation and other media mix works such as film and TV series based on the original. The story is about innocent but zany adolescent girl Young-sim's normal life.

== Plot ==
Young-sim is a fourteen-year-old girl who has a round face, round eyes and a pony tail. Her boyfriend Wang Kyung-tae follows her incessantly. He is considered ugly and stammers when he speaks, but he deeply loves Young-sim. Young-sim treats Kyung-tae coldly. However, Young-sim displays considerable jealousy upon discovering Kyung-tae was with another girl. Her mean best friend and her sister Soon-sim add humor to the story.

== Media ==
=== Film ===
It was released on July 29, 1990.

=== Animation ===
Yeongsimi
- Also known as: Young-sim, Young-shim, Yeong-sim, Yeong-shim
- Hangul: 영심이
- RR: Yeongsimi
- MR: Yŏngsimi
- Created by: Bae Geum-taek
- Based on: Bae Geum-taek, Yeongsimi
- Directed by: Jeong Seung-bae
- Voices of: Choi Su-min; Jang Gwang
- Opening theme: Yeongsimi
- Country of origin: South Korea
- Original language: Korean
- No. of episodes: 13

Production
- Running time: 25 minutes
- Production company: Daewon Media

Original release
- Network: Korean Broadcasting System
- Release: October 5 – December 28, 1990

Related
- Oh! Youngsim (2023)

The original version was a comic book first produced in 1988, and after that it was broadcast on KBS in 1990. The popular video version has 13 episodes in total. Young-sim is a representative character of the early 1990s.

==== Episode list ====
Episode	Subtitle	Air Date	
1	Yeongsimi's Dream	5 October 1990	
2	Class President Election	12 October 1990	
3	"Exam"	19 October 1990	While at a reunion, Young-sim's father, who hears the pride of his friends who have a son who is good at studying, forces Young-sim and Soon-sim to study. Young-sim manages to win first place by rolling a kite, drawing a wick, and rock-paper-scissors with Byeol-nim, and her father boasts to his friends. However, when he hears that his friend's son has won the quiz, he decides to have Young-sim appear on the quiz program.
4	"Quiz"	26 October 1990	
5	"Sunsimi's Birthday"	2 November 1990	
6	"Camping"	9 November 1990	
7	Life is short, and art is long	16 November 1990	
8	"Superstition"	23 November 1990	
9	"Star Prince"	30 November 1990	
10	"I Want to Know"	7 December 1990	
11	"Kyung Tae!"	14 December 1990	
12	"Boot Camp"	21 December 1990	
13	"Mom, Dad, I Love You"	28 December 1990	

=== Novel ===
In the novel version, Bae Geum-taek modernized the setting from 1990's South Korea to that of 2004, otherwise the plot is unchanged.

=== Musical ===
It came out in 2007 under the title March of Youth (젊음의 행진).
