= Oh! Youngsim =

2023 South Korean television series

- Promotional poster
- Also known as: Oh! Young-shim
- Hangul: 오! 영심이
- RR: O! Yeongsimi
- MR: O! Yŏngsimi
- Genre: Romantic comedy
- Based on: Yeongsimi by Bae Geum-taek
- Written by: Jeon Seon-young
- Directed by: Oh Hwan-min; Kim Kyung-eun
- Starring: Song Ha-yoon; Lee Donghae; Lee Min-jae; Jung Woo-yeon
- Music by: Kang Min-guk
- Country of origin: South Korea
- Original language: Korean
- No. of episodes: 10

Production
- Executive producer: Choi Han-gyeol (CP)
- Producers: Kim Kyung-tae; Go Yoo-kyung; Woo Ji-hee; Jung Gwi-jeong
- Running time: 45 minutes
- Production companies: The Great Show; MODT Studio

Original release
- Network: ENA
- Release: May 15 – June 13, 2023

Oh! Youngsim (Korean: 오! 영심이) is a 2023 South Korean television series starring Song Ha-yoon in the title role, along with Lee Donghae, Lee Min-jae, and Jung Woo-yeon. It is based on the characters of the 1990 Korean animated movie titled Yeongsimi, which was an adaptation of the 1988 manhwa of the same name created by Bae Geum-taek. The series is an original drama of Genie TV, and is available for streaming on its platform, and on Viki and Viu in selected regions. It also aired on ENA from May 15 to June 13, 2023, every Monday and Tuesday at 22:00 (KST).

== Synopsis ==
Oh Young-sim and Wang Kyung-tae, childhood friends who taste the sweetness and bitterness of life as they enter their 30s, accidentally reunite after twenty years and develop a bickering romance.

== Cast ==
=== Main ===
- Song Ha-yoon as Oh Young-sim: an entertainment production director for eight years.
- Lee Donghae as Wang Kyung-tae (Mark Wang): CEO of the popular startup company Kingvely.
- Lee Min-jae as Lee Chae-dong: Young-sim's junior colleague who has a secret crush on her.
- Ryu Hyo-young as Gu Wol-sook: Young-sim's childhood friend who is a beauty YouTuber.

=== Supporting ===
- Song Young-jae as Oh Dae-gwang: Young-sim's father who silently supports her.
- Wang Ji-hye as Oh Jin-sim: Young-sim's older sister.
- Tony Ahn as Lee Woo-sang: Young-sim's brother-in-law.
- Ga Young as Oh Soon-sim: Young-sim's younger sister.
- Jo Yoo-ha as Lee Ji-yoo: Young-sim's niece.
- Lee Do-yeop as Heo Gil-dong: broadcasting director of the entertainment department.
- Moon Jeong-ki as Jang-hwan: a junior production director.
- Lami as Sang-eun: Young-sim's junior colleague who is also a production director.

=== Extended ===
- Heo Ga-yoon as Yeo-wool
- Song Jae-ha as Ki-ho
- Eom Chae-young

=== Special appearance ===
- Hyungwon as Han Yo-han

== Production ==
Filming of the series had completed by October 2022.

== Original soundtrack ==
Part 1

Released on May 15, 2023
No.	Title	Lyrics	Music	Artist	Length
1.	"Just Do" (해봐)	Bae Geum-taek	Kwon Seong-yeon	Miso
2.	"Just Do" (해봐 Inst.)		Kwon Seong-yeon
Total length:					5:52

Part 2

Released on May 23, 2023
No.	Title	Lyrics	Music	Artist	Length
1.	"Crack" (틈)	Lee Donghae; J-dub	Lee Donghae; J-dub	Lee Donghae
2.	"Crack" (틈 Inst.)		Lee Donghae; J-dub
Total length:					7:24

Part 3

Released on May 30, 2023
No.	Title	Lyrics	Music	Artist	Length
1.	"Angel Wings" (그린나래)	Kiko; Kook Dong-ho	Kiko; Kook Dong-ho	Raina
2.	"Angel Wings" (그린나래 Inst.)		Kiko; Kook Dong-ho
Total length:					6:42

Part 4

Released on May 30, 2023
No.	Title	Lyrics	Music	Artist	Length
1.	"Call You" (널 부른다)	Kim Seong-hee (Clef); Park Soo-yeon (Clef)	Kim Seong-hee (Clef); Park Soo-yeon (Clef); Choi Woo-jae (Clef)	Nam Young-joo
2.	"Call You" (널 부른다 Inst.)		Kim Seong-hee (Clef); Park Soo-yeon (Clef); Choi Woo-jae (Clef)
Total length:					7:10

Part 5

Released on June 6, 2023
No.	Title	Lyrics	Music	Artist	Length
1.	"I Miss You" (니가 자꾸만 보고 싶어서)	Kim Seong-hee (Clef); Park Soo-yeon (Clef)	Kim Seong-hee (Clef); Park Soo-yeon (Clef); Choi Woo-jae (Clef)	Han Seung-hee
2.	"I Miss You" (니가 자꾸만 보고 싶어서 Inst.)		Kim Seong-hee (Clef); Park Soo-yeon (Clef); Choi Woo-jae (Clef)
Total length:					9:00

Part 6

Released on June 13, 2023
No.	Title	Lyrics	Music	Artist	Length
1.	"Promise" (약속)	Cho Chily	Cho Chily; Moknroll (Psycho Tension)	Oppa Berryyou
2.	"Promise" (약속 Inst.)		Cho Chily; Moknroll (Psycho Tension)
Total length:					8:44

Part 7

Released on June 13, 2023
No.	Title	Lyrics	Music	Artist	Length
1.	"Bbabbabba" (빠빠빠)	Kang Min-hyung	Kang Min-guk; Kim Jong-heon (Psycho Tension)	Rendy
2.	"Bbabbabba" (빠빠빠 Inst.)		Kang Min-guk; Kim Jong-heon (Psycho Tension)
Total length:					6:40

== Ratings ==
Average TV viewership ratings (nationwide)
Ep.	Original broadcast date	Average audience share (Nielsen Korea)
1	May 15, 2023	0.647% (39th)
2	May 16, 2023	0.386% (78th)
3	May 22, 2023	0.282% (128th)
4	May 23, 2023	0.390% (74th)
5	May 29, 2023	N/A
6	May 30, 2023	0.218% (188th)
7	June 5, 2023	0.191% (238th)
8	June 6, 2023	N/A
9	June 12, 2023	0.173% (270th)
10	June 13, 2023	0.185% (245th)
Average		0.309% (Note: This average rating is calculated based on the published ratings. The exact average rating is unknown due to multiple unpublished ratings.)
In the table above, the blue numbers represent the lowest ratings and the red numbers represent the highest ratings.; N/A denotes ratings that were not published.; This series aired on a cable channel/pay TV which normally has a relatively smaller audience compared to free-to-air TV/public broadcasters (KBS, SBS, MBC and EBS).
