= Oh Hye-won =

South Korean actress (born 1986)

- Born: March 13, 1986 (age 40); South Korea
- Education: Seokyeong University (Department of Public Administration)
- Occupations: Actress; model
- Years active: 2016–present
- Agent: DSP Media

Korean name
- Hangul: 오혜원
- RR: O Hyewon
- MR: O Hyewŏn

Oh Hye-won (Korean: 오혜원; born March 13, 1986) is a South Korean actress and model. She is known for her roles in dramas such as Children of Nobody (2018–2019), Designated Survivor: 60 Days (2019) and Dinner Mate (2020). She also appeared in movies Keys to the Heart (2018), Tazza: One Eyed Jack (2019) and #Alive (2020).

== Filmography ==
=== Television series ===
Year	Title	Role	Ref.
2018	Life	Member Jung	
2018	Useless Romance	Sergeant	
2018	Children of Nobody	Cha Se-kyung	
2019	Designated Survivor: 60 Days	Woo Shin-young	
2019	Hell Is Other People	Son Yoo-jung	
2020	Dinner Mate	Im So-ra	
2021	Lost	Client	
2021	KBS Drama Special: "Ordinary Goods"	Soo-jin	
2021	Melancholia	Noh Yeon-woo	
2022	The Killer's Shopping List	Ya-chae	
2023	A Bloody Lucky Day	No Hyun-ji	
2024	A Killer Paradox	Lee Yoo-jeong	
2024	Light Shop	Moon Yoo-na	

=== Film ===
Year	Title	Role	Ref.
2016	The Last Princess	Oh-hye	
2017	Keys to the Heart	Bok-ja's entourage	
2019	Tazza: One Eyed Jack	Bartender	
2020	#Alive	Police Officer	
2023	The Guest	Young-kyu	
