= Choi Kook-hee =

South Korean film director and screenwriter

- Born: 1976 (age 49–50); South Korea
- Occupations: Film director, screenwriter

Korean name
- Hangul: 최국희
- RR: Choe Gukhui
- MR: Ch'oe Kukhŭi

Choi Kook-hee (Korean: 최국희; born 1976), is a South Korean film director and screenwriter. Choi wrote and directed his debut sports film Split (2016) which won New Flesh Award for Best First Feature at the 2017 Fantasia International Film Festival.

== Filmography ==
=== Film ===
- Blue Decoding (short film, 2002) – director
- Tale of Cinema (2005) – directing department
- The Springtime of Life (short film, 2006) – director, screenwriter
- The Sundays of August (2006) – actor
- Carnival (short film, 2007) – director, screenwriter
- Split (2016) – director, screenwriter
- Default (2018) – director
- Life is Beautiful (2022) – director
- Tazza: The Song of Beelzebub (2026)

=== Television ===
- No Way Out: The Roulette (2024) – director

== Awards ==
- 2017 Fantasia International Film Festival: New Flesh Award for Best First Feature (Split)
