= Crazy Mocha Coffee Company =

Pittsburgh cafe chain

- Industry: coffeehouse chain
- Number of locations: 10
- Area served: Pittsburgh, Pennsylvania
- Products: Coffee
- Website: www.crazymocha.com

Crazy Mocha Coffee Company is a now defunct coffeehouse chain in the Pittsburgh, Pennsylvania region. As of August 2021, the chain has 10 locations.

== History ==
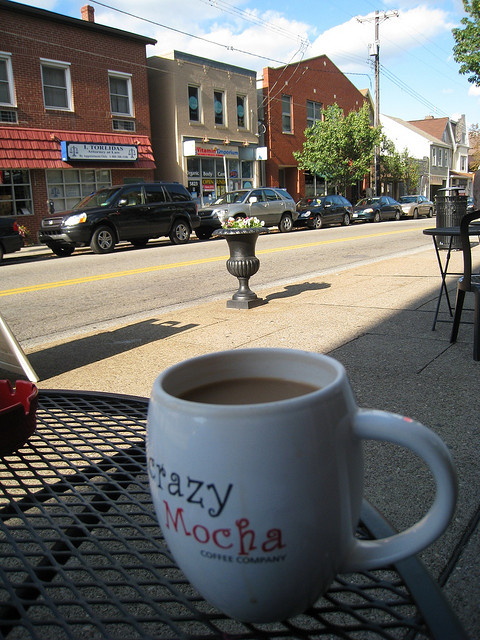
A view from Crazy Mocha

The original store was the Dancing Goats coffee shop on Ellsworth Avenue in Shadyside neighborhood of Pittsburgh. The shop had been named after the apocryphal legend of the dancing goat that heralded the beginning of coffee. It was purchased in 2000 by Ken Zeff, a merchandise buyer for J.C. Penney and native resident of Greenfield.

In 2003, the Crazy Mocha chain had three locations. In 2004, the operation doubled to six locations with 25 employees. The rapid pace of expansion raised questions among observers about whether the growth was sustainable. By 2008, the 21 locations required over 100 employees.

In 2007, Zeff opened a store at PPG Place. Other downtown locations were developed to improve brand awareness. In 2009, the downtown flagship store was opened on Liberty Avenue in the Cultural District.

In 2009, the expansion into Cranberry marked the first time the store had gone beyond City of Pittsburgh limits into the suburbs.

Crazy Mocha was profiled by the Pittsburgh Business Times to highlight retail stores' issues with the 2009 G-20 Pittsburgh summit.

On March 14, 2018, Crazy Mocha was purchased by the Kiva Han Coffee Company, located in Cranberry Township, Pa owned by Ed Wethli.

In October 2020, Crazy Mocha's parent company filed for Chapter 11 bankruptcy, due to the effects of the pandemic. The company divested 10 locations as part of its restructuring plan and under new management those 10 locations are still operating in the City of Pittsburgh.

== Business philosophy ==
Each location is designed to emulate a small and independent coffee shop that fits the neighborhood it's in. The Shadyside location attempts to match the art-conscious neighborhood, South Side location has a faux-iron canopy hanging over the tables in honor of the area's industrial past, and the location at the SouthSide Works was based on a "trendy Brooklyn cafe." The Bloomfield location teamed up with The Dreaming Ant, an independent video rental store.

When possible, Crazy Mocha uses local contractors for construction and avoids opening near other independent coffee shops. The company has been an early newcomer to urban rehabilitation in Lawrenceville and the North Side. The 2010 opening of the North Side location was hailed as the cornerstone of a redevelopment effort in that neighborhood.

== See also ==
- Tazza D'Oro
- List of coffeehouse chains
