= Tazza: The Hidden Card =

2014 film by Kang Hyeong-cheol

- Theatrical release poster
- Hangul: 타짜: 신의 손
- RR: Tajja: sinui son
- MR: T'atcha: sinŭi son
- Directed by: Kang Hyeong-cheol
- Written by: Jo Sang-beom
- Based on: Tajja by Huh Young-man and Kim Se-yeong
- Produced by: Lee Anna
- Starring: Choi Seung-hyun; Shin Se-kyung; Kwak Do-won; Lee Hanee; Yoo Hae-jin; Kim Yoon-seok
- Cinematography: Kim Tae-gyeong
- Edited by: Nam Na-yeong
- Music by: Kim Jun-seok
- Production companies: Sidus FNH; Lotte Entertainment
- Distributed by: Lotte Entertainment
- Release date: September 3, 2014
- Running time: 147 minutes
- Country: South Korea
- Language: Korean
- Box office: US$31 million

Tazza: The Hidden Card (Korean: 타짜: 신의 손; lit. 'Tazza: Hand of God') is a 2014 South Korean crime film directed by Kang Hyeong-cheol based on Huh Young-man and Kim Se-yeong's manhwa of the same name. It is followed by Tazza: One Eyed Jack, released in 2019.

After Ham Dae-gil enters the gambling world of the Korean card game hwatu, he is set up as the fall guy in a crooked deal. To get revenge, he enters a final game which could be fatal to the loser.

== Cast ==
- Choi Seung-hyun (T.O.P) as Ham Dae-gil
  - Jung Yoon-seok as young Dae-gil
- Shin Se-kyung as Heo Mi-na
- Kwak Do-won as Jang Dong-sik
- Lee Hanee as President Woo
- Yoo Hae-jin as Ko Gwang-ryeol
- Kim Yoon-seok as Agui
- Han Joon-woo as Choi Wang-geun
- Lee Geung-young as Kko-jang
- Kim In-kwon as Heo Gwang-chul, Mi-na's older brother
- Oh Jung-se as Director Seo
- Park Hyo-joo as Little Madam
- Go Soo-hee as Madam Song
- Kim Joon-ho as Yu-ryeong ("Ghost")
- Lee Dong-hwi as Jjari ("Worth")
- Kim Won-hae as Artist Jo
- Lee Jun-hyeok as Benjie ("Pliers"), Dae-gil's helper
- Kim Min-sang as Dr. Hwang
- Jo Kyung-hyun as young Mr. Kim
- Son Sang-gyeong as Father Jang
- Park Soo-young as Chang-sik
- Im Jung-eun as Dae-gil's mother
- Lee Dong-yong as Auto repair owner
- Ha Seong-gwang as The Dark Knight of Ansan
- Song Jae-ryong as Gambling den bouncer
- Kim Dae-myung as Billiards hall owner
- Yoon Kyung-ho as Gambler in billiards hall
- Nicky Lee as Ppappa
- Bae Yu-ram as "Halibut"
- Ahn Jae-hong as Woon-do
- Jung Da-won as Joong-ki
- Cha Seung-ho as Bribed detective
- Kwak Soo-jung as Wife of auto repair owner
- Lee Joon-ik as O-ring man (cameo)
- Oh Yeon-soo as Woman at the observatory (cameo)
- Yeo Jin-goo as Agui's pupil (cameo)
- Cha Tae-hyun as Radio DJ (cameo)

== Production ==
Due to the box office success of Choi Dong-hoon's gambling epic Tazza: The High Rollers (it attracted 6.84 million in admissions in 2006, making it one of the highest-grossing Korean films that year), production company Sidus FNH announced a sequel, with Jang Joon-hwan originally attached as screenwriter/director and a release planned for late 2008. But pre-production was later halted, and Jang pulled out of the film.

Speculation about a sequel continued, given that Tajja, the famous local comic series (or "manhwa") illustrated by Huh Young-man and written by Kim Se-yeong that served as the 2006 film's source material comes in four volumes, each with entirely different characters and settings. Tazza 2 is based on the second volume Tazza: Hand of God, which was published on November 16, 2006, by Random House Korea.

In 2012, Kang Hyeong-cheol signed on to direct the sequel, and casting was finalized in late 2013, with Choi Seung-hyun as lead character Ham Dae-gil, the nephew of Goni, the protagonist in Tazza: The High Rollers.

Filming began on January 2, 2014, at a pool hall in Cheongnyangni-dong, Seoul.

== Awards and nominations ==
Year	Award	Category	Recipient	Result
2014	51st Grand Bell Awards	Best Director	Kang Hyeong-cheol	Nominated
2014	51st Grand Bell Awards	Best New Actress	Lee Hanee	Nominated
2014	51st Grand Bell Awards	Best Music	Kim Jun-seok	Nominated
2014	35th Blue Dragon Film Awards	Best Supporting Actress	Lee Hanee	Nominated
2014	35th Blue Dragon Film Awards	Best Editing	Nam Na-yeong	Nominated
2014	35th Blue Dragon Film Awards	Best Music	Kim Jun-seok	Nominated
2014	35th Blue Dragon Film Awards	Popular Star Award	Shin Se-kyung	Won
2015	51st Paeksang Arts Awards	Best New Actress	Lee Hanee	Nominated
2016	4th Annual DramaFever Awards	Best Feature Film	Tazza: The Hidden Card	Won
