= Nam Kyu-hee =

South Korean actress (born 1999)

- Born: October 6, 1999 (age 26); South Korea
- Education: Anyang Arts High School; Dongguk University (Department of Theater and Film)
- Occupation: Actress
- Years active: 2020–present
- Agent: MUMW
- Height: 171 cm (5 ft 7 in)
- Website: makeumineworks.co.kr

Nam Kyu-hee (Korean: 남규희; born October 6, 1999) is a South Korean actress. She made her debuted in the Kakao TV drama, Love Revolution in 2020.

== Education ==
Nam graduated from Anyang Arts High School. She studied in the Department of Theater and Film at Dongguk University.

== Career ==
In 2020, Nam revealed as a new actor of YG Entertainment.

In 2025, after YG Entertainment announced it would end its actor management division, Nam signed an exclusive contract with Runup Company.

In February 2026, Nam signed signed an exclusive contract with MUMW.

== Filmography ==
=== Film ===
Year	Title	Role	Notes	Ref.
2021	Time of Memory	Kang Da-som	Movie version	
2023	The New Employee: The Movie	Lee Kang-hae		

=== Television series ===
Year	Title	Role	Notes	Ref.
2021	Check Out The Event	Noh Hyo-jung		
2022	Our Blues	Yang Sung-seon		
2024	The Atypical Family	Student	Cameo	
2024	Namib	Jang Yoon-hee	Cameo	
2025	Crushology 101	Kwon Bo-bae		
2025	Pump Up the Healthy Love	Kim Ye-jin		

=== Web series ===
Year	Title	Role	Ref.
2020	Love Revolution	Bang Ye-seul	
2021	Mokkoji Kitchen	Oh Ro-in	
2021	Pumpkin Time	Shin Joo-hye	
2021	A Time to Remember	Kang Da-som	
2022	The New Employee	Lee Kang-hae	
2023	Yes, I See	Bae Woo-ri	
2025	S Line	Kim Hye-young	

=== Music video appearances ===
Year	Song title	Artist	Ref.
2020	"PSYCHO"	Justin Huang	
2024	"MY TYPE" (딱 내 스타일이야)	Lee Seung-hoon of Winner	
