= Le Grand Chef 2: Kimchi Battle =

- Promotional poster for Le Grand Chef 2: Kimchi Battle
- Hangul: 식객 2: 김치 전쟁
- Hanja: 食客 2: 김치 戰爭
- RR: Sikgaek 2: gimchi jeonjaeng
- MR: Sikkaek 2: kimch'i chŏnjaeng
- Directed by: Baek Dong-hoon
- Screenplay by: Shin Dong-ik; Hwang Seong-gu
- Based on: Sikgaek by Huh Young-man
- Produced by: Lee Seong-hun; Choi Chang-won; Choi Jun-yeong
- Starring: Kim Jung-eun; Jin Goo
- Cinematography: Jo Yong-gyu
- Edited by: Park Gok-ji
- Production company: IROOM Pictures
- Distributed by: Lotte Entertainment; M-Line Distribution (international)
- Release date: 28 January 2010
- Running time: 119 minutes
- Country: South Korea
- Language: Korean
- Box office: US$2.9 million

Le Grand Chef 2: Kimchi Battle (Korean: 식객 2: 김치 전쟁, also known as Le Grand Chef 2: Kimchi Wars) is a 2010 South Korean film starring Kim Jung-eun and Jin Goo. It was released on January 28, 2010.

Loosely based on characters that appeared in Huh Young-man's celebrated manhwa (comic) series Sikgaek, it is a spin-off of 2007 adaptation Le Grand Chef, but with an original story. Culinary genius Seong-chan hears the news that world-renowned chef Jang-eun is trying to close down his childhood residence/restaurant, Chunyanggak. To save Chunyanggak, Seong-chan must compete against Jang-eun to make the best kimchi dish. The film showcased many different regional kimchi dishes and modern fusion recipes.

== Plot ==
During a state visit to Japan the Korean president gets involved in a heated debate with the Japanese prime minister over the origins of kimchi, with the latter boldly claiming that kimchi was originally from Japan, thus an original Japanese dish. This does not please the Korean president, so he vows to market the dish to the world as the originator. Upon his return to Korea, he announces a national "Kimchi Contest" to reaffirm its position as a Korean product.

Jang-eun (Kim Jung-eun), is a famous fusion chef, who left Korea 10 years ago to train in Japan and hides her broken heart with a cold-hearted mask. She has always resented that her mother was once a gisaeng and for cherishing her Chunyanggak Restaurant more than herself and her own daughter. Thus she has returned to shut down the restaurant which her mother has run for years. On the other hand, her step-brother Seong-chan (Jin Goo), who was taken in by Jang-eun's mother after his deaf-and-mute mother was unable to care for him, is an advocate of tradition and wants to keep the beloved restaurant. He proposes that they compete in the Kimchi Contest for the rights to close or save the restaurant.

== Cast ==
- Kim Jung-eun - Jang-eun
- Jin Goo - Seong-chan
- Wang Ji-hye - Jin-soo
- Choi Jong-won - Ja-woon
- Lee Bo-hee - Soo-hyang
- Lee Byung-joon - Jo Dong-hee
- Kim Young-ok - Yeo-sang's mother
- Park Gil-soo - Department chief Kim
- Heo Hyeon-ho - Professor Oh
- Lee Kan-hee - Teacher Kong
- Lee Seung-cheol - Korean president
- Baek Jin-ki - young Yeo-sang
- Lee Jung-joon - chef #3
- Han Kuk-jin - editor
- Kwon Oh-jin - union president
- Lee Jang-won - announcer
- Sung Ji-ru - Yeo-sang (cameo)
- Choo Ja-hyun - Seong-chan's mother (cameo)
- Kim Young-woong - Arnold

== Production ==
Approximately 30 percent of the film was shot in Gwangju. Actors Kim Jung-eun and Jin Goo, along with celebrity chef Edward Young-min Kwon, were named special kimchi ambassadors by the city when it hosted the annual Gwangju Kimchi Cultural Festival in October–November 2009. South Jeolla Province occupies 53.6 percent of Korea's entire agricultural land, and Gwangju grows an abundance of the ingredients which are needed to make kimchi, namely: lettuce, radish, garlic, onion and dried red pepper. The world kimchi research center is also scheduled to be established in the region.

Kim Jung-eun and Jin Goo both took 3 months of cooking lessons from food director Kim Soo-jin prior to production.

== Reception ==
The film ranked second and grossed ₩1,836,799,468 in its first week of release, and grossed a total of ₩3,232,220,660 domestically after eight weeks of screening.

== International release ==
After opening in Korea on January 28, 2010, the film also screened on February 20 at AMC Theatres in 20 major U.S. cities including New York, Atlanta, Chicago and Los Angeles. This is the first time that a Korean film screened simultaneously in South Korea and the United States.
