= Handae Rhee =

South Korean filmmaker (born 1977)

- Born: March 19, 1977 (age 49); Seoul, South Korea
- Education: Korea University, University of Southern California
- Occupations: Film producer, businessman
- Years active: 2004–present

Korean name
- Hangul: 이한대
- RR: I Handae
- MR: I Handae

Handae Rhee (born March 19, 1977) is a South Korean film producer and distributor. He is currently the chief executive officer (CEO) of Sidus, a company based in Seoul that works in the production, distribution, and investment of domestic and international films. Rhee has been involved in the distribution of titles such as Shrek and Transformers and the production of domestic hits such as Tazza: The Hidden Card.

== Life and career ==
Rhee was born in Seoul, South Korea in 1977. He graduated from Korea University in Sociology and received his MBA in Business Administration from the University of Southern California (USC) in 2010.

Starting 2004, Rhee began working in film strategy, distribution, marketing, and content development with the media development studio, CJ Entertainment. There, he was involved in the distribution of about 70 titles, such as You Are My Destiny, and aided in the marketing of movies like Shrek 3 and Kung Fu Panda.

Rhee started working at the strategy consulting firm nPlatform in 2008 and took his skills to KT Groups, a large media provider in Korea, in 2010 to be a content strategy consultant. There, he developed long-term strategy building for pay-TV and established strategic synergistic content with 15 KT affiliates.

Handae Rhee worked with KT till 2012 when he was appointed as the CEO of the film production company Sidus and became the youngest official in the KT group. As the new CEO, he produced Tazza 2, which boasted a theater attendance of 4 million, and participated in the investment and distribution of The Nut Job, which drew $6 billion in sales in the American box office and 500,000 people in the domestic market. In 2014, Sidus returned to rank within the top five domestic distributors.
