= Gourmet (TV series) =

2008 South Korean television series

- Promotional poster
- Also known as: Trencherman; Best Chef; The Grand Chef
- Hangul: 식객
- Hanja: 食客
- RR: Sikgaek
- MR: Sikkaek
- Genre: Romance; Drama; Cooking
- Based on: Sikgaek by Huh Young-man
- Written by: Choi Wan-kyu; Park Hoo-jung
- Directed by: Choi Jong-soo
- Starring: Kim Rae-won; Nam Sang-mi; Kim So-yeon; Kwon Oh-joong
- Country of origin: South Korea
- Original language: Korean
- No. of episodes: 24

Production
- Producer: Lee Jin-saek
- Running time: Mondays and Tuesdays at 21:55 (KST)
- Production company: JS Pictures

Original release
- Network: SBS TV
- Release: 16 June – 9 September 2008

Related
- Le Grand Chef

Gourmet (Korean: 식객; RR: Sikgaek) is a 2008 South Korean television series starring Kim Rae-won and Nam Sang-mi. It aired on SBS TV from June 16 to September 9, 2008 on Mondays and Tuesdays at 21:55 for 24 episodes.

It was adapted from Sikgaek, a popular manhwa by Huh Young-man, which was first serialized in newspapers in 2002. The TV series explores the theme of cooking through the rivalry between two hansik (Korean cuisine) chefs, as one of them travels around the nation looking for the best ingredients and recipes.

== Plot ==
Kim Rae-Won stars as the warm hearted chef-in-training Lee Sung-Chan, while actress Nam Sang-Mi plays a silly country girl, Kim Jin-soo, who trails Lee with high hopes of becoming a food columnist. Veteran actor Choi Bul-Am appears as Master Oh Sook-soo, Lee's stepfather and the only person who truly believes in Lee's potential.

Sung-Chan is a happy and bright young man who loves to cook. Leaving the heavy responsibility of becoming the head chef of Oh's famous restaurant to his stepbrother, he explores the world of cooking and discovers that he's actually good at it. When Oh announces that he will not choose his own son to become the owner and head chef, cold-hearted jealousy and competition arise.

== Cast ==
=== Main characters ===
- Kim Rae-won as Lee Sung-chan
  - Noh Young-hak as teenage Sung-chan
  - Kang Yi-seok as young Sung-chan
- Kwon Oh-joong as Oh Bong-joo
  - Ahn Yong-joon as teenage Bong-joo
- Nam Sang-mi as Kim Jin-soo
- Kim So-yeon as Yoon Joo-hee
- Won Ki-joon as Gong Min-woo
- Choi Bool-am as Oh Seung-geun

=== Supporting characters ===
- Kang Nam-gil as Director Han (Jin-soo's boss)
- Jung Jin as Ja-woon
- Shim Yang-hong as Director Yoon (Joo-hee's father)
- Kim Ae-kyung as Madam Jo
- Lee Won-yong as Jong-goo
- Lee Won-jong as Dal-pyung
- Hoon Ki as Ki-jung
- Kim Sun-hyuk as Sang-ki
- Lee Kyung-jin as Jin-soo's mother
- Choi Jae-hwan as Seok-dong
- Do Yoon-joo as General manager
- Kim Hye-jung as Manager Kang
- Yang Taek-jo as President Seo
- Kim Sung-kyum as President Jang
- Lee Ki-young as Matsumoto Junichi
- Jung Young-sook as Soon-boon (Seung-geun's friend)
- Jo Sang-goo as legendary butcher Kang Pyun-soo
- Choi Song-hyun as cooking contest MC
- Jang Moon-seok as towing truck driver
- Choi Jae-kwon as Sung Sik-gaek (Sung-chan's friend)
- Yeo Jin-goo as Ho-tae
- Kim Da-in

== Episode ratings ==
Date	Episode	Nationwide	Seoul
2008-06-16	Special	6.5%	7.5%
2008-06-17	1	13.2% (5th)	13.9% (5th)
2008-06-17	2	16.1% (3rd)	17.5% (3rd)
2008-06-23	3	16.4% (4th)	17.7% (2nd)
2008-06-24	4	16.0% (3rd)	17.3% (2nd)
2008-06-30	5	16.4% (3rd)	17.0% (3rd)
2008-07-01	6	18.3% (2nd)	19.4% (2nd)
2008-07-07	7	18.1% (3rd)	19.3% (2nd)
2008-07-08	8	20.2% (2nd)	20.7% (2nd)
2008-07-14	9	18.9% (3rd)	20.1% (2nd)
2008-07-15	10	20.7% (2nd)	21.8% (2nd)
2008-07-21	11	22.0% (2nd)	23.5% (1st)
2008-07-22	12	22.4% (2nd)	23.3% (2nd)
2008-07-28	13	21.7% (2nd)	21.6% (2nd)
2008-07-29	14	23.5% (2nd)	24.4% (1st)
2008-08-04	15	20.7% (2nd)	21.1% (2nd)
2008-08-05	16	23.4% (2nd)	23.8% (2nd)
2008-08-11	17	23.5% (2nd)	24.0% (1st)
2008-08-18	18	22.1% (2nd)	23.0% (2nd)
2008-08-25	19	23.3% (2nd)	23.9% (2nd)
2008-08-26	20	22.9% (2nd)	23.0% (2nd)
2008-09-01	21	20.6% (3rd)	21.5% (2nd)
2008-09-02	22	19.1% (2nd)	20.5% (2nd)
2008-09-08	23	20.5% (3rd)	21.2% (3rd)
2008-09-09	24	26.7% (2nd)	27.9% (1st)
Average		20.3%	21.1%

Source: TNS Media Korea

== Awards and nominations ==
Year	Award	Category	Recipient	Result
2008	2nd Korea Drama Awards	Best Drama	Gourmet	Nominated
2008	2nd Korea Drama Awards	Excellence Award, Actor	Kim Rae-won	Won
2008	SBS Drama Awards	Top Excellence Award, Actor	Kim Rae-won	Nominated
2008	SBS Drama Awards	Excellence Award, Actor in a Special Planning Drama	Kim Rae-won	Nominated
2008	SBS Drama Awards	Excellence Award, Actress in a Special Planning Drama	Nam Sang-mi	Nominated
2008	SBS Drama Awards	Best Supporting Actor in a Special Planning Drama	Won Ki-joon	Nominated
2008	SBS Drama Awards	Best Supporting Actress in a Special Planning Drama	Kim So-yeon	Won
2008	SBS Drama Awards	Best Supporting Actress in a Special Planning Drama	Kim Ae-kyung	Nominated
2008	SBS Drama Awards	Best Young Actor	Yeo Jin-goo	Won
2008	SBS Drama Awards	Top 10 Stars	Kim Rae-won	Won
2009	45th Baeksang Arts Awards	Best Director (TV)	Choi Jong-soo	Nominated

== DVD release ==
The television series was released on DVD in November 2008 by YA Entertainment in two-volume boxed sets. Each volume included four discs, with Korean audio and English-language subtitles.

== International broadcast ==
It aired in the Philippines on the GMA Network beginning July 18, 2011.

It aired in Thailand on Channel 3 every Monday to Friday at 1.40 p.m. starting from August 14, 2012.

== See also ==
Le Grand Chef - 2007 film based on the same manhwa.
