= Tazza d'Oro (Pittsburgh) =

Coordinates: 40.4747°N 79.9188°W

Tazza D'Oro
- Interactive map of Tazza D'Oro

Restaurant information
- Established: June 23, 1999
- Owner: Amy Enrico
- Location: 1125 North Highland Avenue, Pittsburgh, Pennsylvania
- Other locations: Gates and Hillman Centers
- Website: www.tazzadoro.net

Tazza D'Oro (Italian: [ˈtattsa ˈdɔːro]) is a café and espresso bar located in Pittsburgh. The name means "Golden Cup/Mug" in Italian. The main location is in Highland Park neighborhood, where it has become a centerpiece of the neighborhood. There is a second location in the Gates and Hillman Centers at Carnegie Mellon University.

It has been identified as part of a trend for higher quality coffee in Pittsburgh.

The European-style cafe serves only single-origin coffee. The current coffee roaster is Verve, located in Santa Cruz, California. The cafe has acquired a reputation as being bicycle-friendly, and in honor of those customers, the cafe offers a special coffee roast called "Bicycle Love." All told, about 70% of the food is locally sourced. This includes the pastries, which are produced by the family's bakery. The cafe displays post cards from customers' travels. (Note: There is no relation to fellow Pittsburgh cafe Enrico Biscotti Company.)

The owner is Amy Enrico. She is a graduate of University of Pittsburgh and was a co-founder of nTouch Research, Inc., a company that had conducted medical tests for pharmaceutical companies. Her travels, including to Seattle, inspired her dream of owning a coffee shop. Her family owns Enrico's Bakery in Jeannette, Pennsylvania. Now in its 3rd generation of family ownership, the bakery is managed by her brother.

It opened in June 1999. Enrico had received assistance from Community Development Corporation, a non-profit group that assists redevelopment in Highland Park. As of 2000, the coffee shop had grown to 12 employees. The shop's original coffee roasters was Batdorf and Bronson, and later to Verve Coffee Roasters, a small company in Santa Cruz, California For a time, there had been a location on Penn Avenue in the Pittsburgh Central Downtown Historic District portion of Downtown Pittsburgh. In 2009, a new location opened in the Gates and Hillman Centers at Carnegie Mellon University. A number of businesses had sought to locate in that building, and Tazza D'Oro's offer was aided by the commitment to "fair trade and organically grown coffee."

In 2009, Tazza D'Oro celebrated its 10-year anniversary with more than 200 customers who enjoyed coffee and offerings from East End Brewing Company. Enrico has worked with East Liberty Development Inc. to attract more businesses to the neighboring area, especially Bryant Street.

The cafe periodically hosts local officials for discussions with constituents.

== See also ==
- Crazy Mocha Coffee Company
