= Le Grand Chef =

2007 film

- Promotional poster for Le Grand Chef
- Hangul: 식객
- Hanja: 食客
- RR: Sikgaek
- MR: Sikkaek
- Directed by: Jeon Yun-su
- Written by: Jeon Yun-su; Shin Dong-ik
- Based on: Sikgaek by Huh Young-man
- Produced by: Hwang Hyeon-jeong; Lee Jung-suk; Kim Dong-joo; Lee Seong-hoon
- Starring: Kim Kang-woo; Lee Ha-na
- Cinematography: Choi Kwang-sik
- Edited by: Park Gok-ji; Jung Jin-hee
- Music by: Hwang Sang-joon
- Production company: ShowEast Co Ltd
- Distributed by: CJ Entertainment; M-Line Distribution (international)
- Release date: 1 November 2007
- Running time: 114 minutes
- Country: South Korea
- Language: Korean
- Box office: US$20,794,760

Le Grand Chef (Korean: 식객; RR: Sikgaek) is a 2007 South Korean comedy-drama film starring Kim Kang-woo, Im Won-hee and Lee Ha-na. Produced by ShowEast and distributed by CJ Entertainment, it was released on November 1, 2007 with the length of 114 minutes.

Based on the popular manhwa Sikgaek by Huh Young-man, the film tells the story of two chefs competing for the title of heir to the last Royal Chef of the Joseon period.

== Synopsis ==
At a press conference, the cooking knife of the last Royal Chef of Joseon Dynasty is presented to the public. The chef, who did not wish to cook for the Japanese imperial rulers, cut off his hand with this knife. The Japanese bureaucrat at the time was moved by the chef's loyalty to king and country, and kept it upon his return to Japan. Now, to redeem past evils, his son has decided to return it to Korea. In order to find a deserving owner he announces a nationwide culinary competition to find the best cook to own this knife, and become the true heir of the last Korean Royal Chef of Joseon Dynasty.

Archenemies Seong-chan (Kim Kang-woo) and Bong-ju (Im Won-hee) rekindle their longstanding rivalry as they sharpen their knives. Five years before, the two had competed to take over Unamjeong, a renowned Korean restaurant. But Seong-chan suffered a critical blow when his blowfish dish poisons the jurors. Distraught, he retires to the countryside, while Bong-ju exploits the wealth and fame of his inheritance. With the help of Jin-su (Lee Ha-na), a pretty, energetic reporter, Seong-chan makes a comeback. But now, he must not only battle the blindly ambitious Bong-ju, but also face the corrupt jurors and take care of his Alzheimer's-struck grandfather, and also take a few moments to contemplate the budding romance with Jin-su.

== Cast ==
- Kim Kang-woo as Seong-chan
  - Lee Tae-ri - young Seong-chan - (credited as Lee Min-ho)
- Lee Ha-na as Jin-su
- Im Won-hee as Bong-ju
- Jung Eun-pyo - Ho-seong, Seong-chan's sous-chef in the competition
- Kim Seong-won - finals commentator
- Jung Jin

== Reception ==
The film grossed a total of ₩18,472,917,203 in South Korea, after six weeks of screening. It sold 3,038,868 tickets nationwide and was the 4th most attended film of 2007.

== Spin-off ==
The manhwa was also adapted into the television series Gourmet starring Kim Rae-won, Nam Sang-mi and Kim So-yeon, that aired on SBS in 2008.

A sequel to the film, Le Grand Chef 2: Kimchi Battle was released in 2010, starring Kim Jung-eun and Jin Goo.
