= Tazza: The High Rollers =

2006 film by Choi Dong-hun

- Theatrical release poster
- Hangul: 타짜
- RR: Tajja
- MR: T'atcha
- Directed by: Choi Dong-hoon
- Written by: Choi Dong-hoon
- Based on: Tajja by Huh Young-man and Kim Se-yeong
- Produced by: Cha Seung-jae; Kim Mi-hee
- Starring: Cho Seung-woo; Kim Hye-soo; Baek Yoon-sik; Yoo Hae-jin
- Cinematography: Choi Young-hwan
- Edited by: Shin Min-kyung
- Music by: Jang Young-gyu
- Production company: Sidus FNH
- Distributed by: CJ Entertainment
- Release date: September 28, 2006
- Running time: 139 minutes
- Country: South Korea
- Language: Korean
- Budget: US$5.5 million
- Box office: US$39.2 million

Tazza: The High Rollers (Korean: 타짜) is a 2006 South Korean crime film directed by Choi Dong-hoon and based on Huh Young-man and Kim Se-yeong's manhwa of the same name. Produced by Sidus FNH and distributed by CJ Entertainment, the story revolves around a group of gambling drifters involved in the Korean card game hwatu. It was a huge commercial and critical success, becoming one of South Korea's highest-grossing films and winning numerous awards. It was the second best-selling film of 2006 in South Korea, with 6,847,777 admissions nationwide.

== Plot ==
In 1994, Goni (original name Kim Gon), a recent university graduate, has lost his entire savings, and money stolen from his family (his older sister), after being swindled by professional cheating gamblers (Park Moo Sik and Kwak Cheol Yong). In order to regain the money, from 1994 to 1995, Goni begins training in the art of trickery under one of the best gamblers in the country, Mr. Pyeong (also translated as Officer Pyeong). He is the top three gamblers, along with Agui of Jeolla Province and JJakgwi (One ear of Gyeongsang Province). He becomes well-known, traveling to different gambling places throughout the country with Pyeong.

Madam Jeong, who runs an illegal gambling operation and plays the role of the architect of setting the plot in their gambling fraud schemes, begins to show interest in Goni. Over some philosophical differences in the art of gambling, Goni leaves Pyeong and begins working for Jeong, whom he also has a love tryst with. A concerned Pyeong tries to encourage Goni to leave the gambling scene by cutting his finger, but while Goni tries to cut fingers, he accidentally meets Agui, who is known to kill his opponents after a gambling match with him.

Goni receives a call that Mr. Pyeong was found dead with his wrist sliced off (initially implied to be a result of losing the match against Agui, as Agui murders his opponent). An angry Goni, seeking revenge, prepares to have a proper match with Agui. While he is playing another match that leads to the arrest of Madam Jeong, he meets another cardsharp, Ko Gwang Ryol, who joins the dream team to help Goni win his match with Agui. Goni meets JJakgwi, from whom he learns the art of lying. Goni also develops a relationship with Hwa-ran, and delivers money to his family. Before he meets Agui, he tries to beat Kwak Cheol-yong at his own game. He is later caught, but Goni murders Kwak Cheol-yong's squad in an impromptu car accident.

Meanwhile, Raccoon finds that Madam Jeong is the real murderer of Mr Pyeong; she had her bodyguard kill him. Ko Gwang Ryeol plays against Agui and gets hurt. Goni finally gets a match with Agui, with Madam Jeong helping Goni, and leads to Agui losing the bet. However, as the game progresses it is revealed Goni has suspected Madam Jeong, and makes Agui and Madam Jeong lose everything they have. After a fight on a train, Goni mysteriously disappears. Goni, hiding his previous life, becomes involved in another form of gambling.

== Cast ==
- Cho Seung-woo as Kim Goni
- Kim Hye-soo as Madam Jeong
- Baek Yoon-sik as Mr. Pyeong
- Yoo Hae-jin as Ko Gwang-ryeol
- Kim Yoon-seok as Agui
- Kim Eung-soo as Kwak Cheol-yong
- Kim Sang-ho as Park Moo-seok
- Lee Soo-kyung as Hwa-ran
- Park Soo-young as Go Ni's Uncle
- Kim Jung-nan as Se-ran
- Jo Sang-geon as Raccoon (detective)
- Huh Young-man (cameo)

== Development ==
Director Choi was offered to make the film by SIDUS FNH and rejected it three times. After deciding to make the film, he met Huh YoungMan and asked for permission to recreate the story. Choi read the original manhwa three times in a row in one sitting, and never revisited it for 6 months. He created an outline of 12 pages, and the scenario was written based on that outline. Writing a draft for the scenario took him a year.

The original manhwa was created based on Tazza Jang, ByeongYoon's story. Director Choi sought advice to Jang to make the film. Cho, SeungWoo learned hwatu skills from Jang.

== Home media ==
5 Points Pictures gave the film a two-disc DVD release in North America on September 18, 2012. The film is subtitled and includes nearly 3 hours of bonus features, including the making of the film, a comparison between the film and its source manhwa, and gambling tricks explained by a former professional gambler.

== Box office ==
Tazza: The High Rollers was a huge critical success, becoming one of South Korea's highest-grossing films. It was the second best-selling film of 2006 in South Korea, with 6,847,777 admissions nationwide.

== Critical reception ==
In a review for the San Francisco Chronicle, G. Allen Johnson described Tazza: The High Rollers as a "ton of fun, a totally irresistible tale of gambling, greed, love and violence. With gorgeous actors, designer clothes and thrilling action". Matt Zoller Seitz of The New York Times called it a "terrific film about the sensual energy and reckless optimism of youth" and compared the chemistry between Goni and Madam Jeong to that of characters in Jean-Luc Godard's early films.

Variety wrote that the film's long run time is hardly noticeable as "the gambling scenes, which in true Korean style often end in rough-and-tumbles, are restlessly shot in handheld closeup, while the non-gambling interludes, lensed more conventionally in good-looking widescreen, have a noir-ish flavor, with characters endlessly toying with each other." They noted that despite the complicated script "sounding tortuous on paper" and being difficult to grasp initially due to being told mostly in flashbacks, Tazza ties up all of its loose ends in the end. The magazine also praised the performances of Kim Hye-soo and Baek Yoon-sik.

== Sequels ==
A sequel, Tazza: The Hidden Card, was directed by Kang Hyeong-cheol and starred Choi Seung-hyun, Shin Se-kyung, Kwak Do-won and Lee Hanee, with Yoo Hae-jin and Kim Yoon-seok reprising their roles. It began filming on January 2, 2014, and was released on September 3, 2014.

A second sequel, Tazza: One Eyed Jack, was released in 2019. It was directed by Kwon Oh-kwang and stars Park Jung-min and Ryoo Seung-bum.

== Accolades ==
Year	Award	Category	Recipients	Result
2006	2nd University Film Festival of Korea	Best Actor	Cho Seung-woo	Won
2006	2nd University Film Festival of Korea	Best Actress	Kim Hye-soo	Won
2006	14th Chunsa Film Art Awards	Best Film	Tazza: The High Rollers	Nominated
2006	14th Chunsa Film Art Awards	Best Director	Choi Dong-hoon	Nominated
2006	14th Chunsa Film Art Awards	Best Actor	Cho Seung-woo	Nominated
2006	14th Chunsa Film Art Awards	Best Actress	Kim Hye-soo	Won
2006	14th Chunsa Film Art Awards	Best Supporting Actor	Baek Yoon-sik	Nominated
2006	14th Chunsa Film Art Awards	Best Supporting Actor	Yoo Hae-jin	Nominated
2006	14th Chunsa Film Art Awards	Best Editing	Shin Min-kyung	Won
2006	27th Blue Dragon Film Awards	Best Film	Tazza: The High Rollers	Nominated
2006	27th Blue Dragon Film Awards	Best Director	Choi Dong-hoon	Nominated
2006	27th Blue Dragon Film Awards	Best Actor	Cho Seung-woo	Nominated
2006	27th Blue Dragon Film Awards	Best Actress	Kim Hye-soo	Won
2006	27th Blue Dragon Film Awards	Best Supporting Actor	Kim Yoon-seok	Nominated
2006	27th Blue Dragon Film Awards	Best Cinematography	Choi Young-hwan	Won
2006	27th Blue Dragon Film Awards	Best Lighting	Kim Sung-kwan	Nominated
2006	27th Blue Dragon Film Awards	Technical Award (Editing)	Shin Min-kyung	Nominated
2006	27th Blue Dragon Film Awards	Popular Star Award	Kim Hye-soo	Won
2007	1st Asian Film Awards	Best Actress	Kim Hye-soo	Nominated
2007	43rd Baeksang Arts Awards	Grand Prize (Daesang)	Tazza: The High Rollers	Won
2007	43rd Baeksang Arts Awards	Best Film	Tazza: The High Rollers	Nominated
2007	43rd Baeksang Arts Awards	Best Director	Choi Dong-hoon	Won
2007	43rd Baeksang Arts Awards	Best Actor	Cho Seung-woo	Nominated
2007	43rd Baeksang Arts Awards	Best Actress	Kim Hye-soo	Nominated
2007	8th Newport Beach Film Festival	Best Feature	The High Rollers	Won
2007	8th Newport Beach Film Festival	Best Director	Choi Dong-hoon	Won
2007	8th Newport Beach Film Festival	Best Actor	Cho Seung-woo	Won
2007	8th Newport Beach Film Festival	Best Actress	Kim Hye-soo	Won
2007	44th Grand Bell Awards	Best Director	Choi Dong-hoon	Nominated
2007	44th Grand Bell Awards	Best Actress	Kim Hye-soo	Nominated
2007	44th Grand Bell Awards	Best Supporting Actor	Kim Yoon-seok	Won
2007	44th Grand Bell Awards	Best Cinematography	Choi Young-hwan	Nominated
2007	44th Grand Bell Awards	Best Editing	Shin Min-kyung	Nominated
2007	44th Grand Bell Awards	Best Lighting	Kim Sung-kwan	Nominated
2007	44th Grand Bell Awards	Best Costumes	Jo Sang-gyeong	Won
2007	8th Busan Film Critics Awards	Best Screenplay	Choi Dong-hoon	Won
2007	8th Busan Film Critics Awards	Best Supporting Actor	Kim Yoon-seok	Won
2007	6th Korean Film Awards	Best Film	Tazza: The High Rollers	Nominated
2007	6th Korean Film Awards	Best Director	Choi Dong-hoon	Nominated
2007	6th Korean Film Awards	Best Actor	Cho Seung-woo	Nominated
2007	6th Korean Film Awards	Best Actress	Kim Hye-soo	Nominated
2007	6th Korean Film Awards	Best Cinematography	Choi Young-hwan	Nominated
2007	6th Korean Film Awards	Best Editing	Shin Min-kyung	Won
2007	6th Korean Film Awards	Best Screenplay	Choi Dong-hoon	Won
2007	1st Korea Movie Star Awards	Best Actor	Cho Seung-woo	Won
2007	1st Korea Movie Star Awards	Best Actress	Kim Hye-soo	Won
2007	1st Korea Movie Star Awards	Best Supporting Actor	Kim Yoon-seok	Won
2007	4th Max Movie Awards	Best Actress	Kim Hye-soo	Nominated
