= Default (2018 film) =

2018 film by Choi Kook-hee

- Theatrical release poster
- Hangul: 국가부도의 날
- Hanja: 國家不渡의 날
- RR: Gukga budoui nal
- MR: Kukka pudoŭi nal
- Directed by: Choi Kook-hee
- Written by: Eom Seong-min
- Produced by: Lee Yoo-jin
- Starring: Kim Hye-soo; Yoo Ah-in; Huh Joon-ho; Jo Woo-jin; Vincent Cassel
- Music by: Kim Tae-seong
- Production company: Zip Cinema
- Distributed by: CJ Entertainment
- Release date: November 28, 2018
- Running time: 114 minutes
- Country: South Korea
- Languages: Korean; English
- Box office: US$27.6 million

Default (Korean: 국가부도의 날; lit. 'National Bankruptcy Day') is a 2018 South Korean drama film directed by Choi Kook-hee. The film was released on November 28, 2018. Starring Kim Hye-soo, Yoo Ah-in, Huh Joon-ho, Jo Woo-jin, and Vincent Cassel, it is the first Korean film concerning the IMF financial crisis as its main subject.

== Plot ==
Default dramatizes the behind-the-scenes story of the IMF negotiations that took place during the financial crisis in 1997 through three parallel stories.

Factory owner Gap-su (Huh Joon-ho) wins a contract to supply metal bowls to a big department store, but the store pays him with a promissory note — and so by accepting it, Gap-su unknowingly exposes himself to the risk that his customer won't be able to pay him. This backfires when the department store goes bankrupt, leaving Gap-su without the funds to pay his suppliers.

Meanwhile, a young financial analyst named Jung-hak (Yoo Ah-in) hears stories on the radio about families in distress — particularly those selling their homes below market price to pay bills resulting from small business bankruptcies. Seeking to profit from this situation, Jung-hak sets up his own investment fund to bet against the Korean economy.

Finally, the governor of Korea's central bank reads a report from his head of monetary policy, a woman named Si-hyun (Kim Hye-soo). Si-hyun's report concludes that Korea will run out of foreign reserves which serves to peg the Korean won's artificially fixed exchange rate to the US dollar within a week. This triggers an emergency meeting of top government officials, who must keep the Korean economy from collapsing.

These three stories show the 1997 financial crisis from different perspectives. Si-hyun's story shows how the government acted during the crisis, Jung-hak's narrative frames the downturn in economic terms, and Gap-su represents millions of real Korean small business owners who suffered in 1997. At each of these levels, Default embodies the trauma resulting from the crisis: we see characters desperate to sell their homes, drowning their sorrows in soju, and even committing suicide.

== Cast ==
=== Main ===
- Kim Hye-soo as Han Shi-hyun

A Senior financial analyst at the Bank of Korea who is striving to do the right thing during the seven days before the country is declared a liquidity crisis and sought the bailout programme from the IMF.

- Yoo Ah-in as Yoon Jung-hak

A former banker who thinks the crisis is a lifetime chance for investment.

- Huh Joon-ho as Gab-soo
- Jo Woo-jin as Vice-Minister of the Ministry of Finance

=== Supporting ===
- Vincent Cassel as managing director of IMF
- Kim Hong-fa as New chief economist
- Um Hyo-sup as Former chief economist
- Song Young-chang as Old gentleman
- Kwon Hae-hyo as Chancellor
- Jo Han-chul as Lee Dae-hwan
- Ryu Deok-hwan as Orange
- Park Jin-joo as Kang Yoon-joo
- Jang Sung-bum as Park Jin
- Jeon Bae-soo as Young-bum
- Yeom Hye-ran as Hee-won
- Dong Ha as Third generation chaebol
- Kim Min-sang as Department head Lee
- Jung Kyu-soo as President Jung
- Kim Hyung-mook as Chief financial officer
- Seo Young-sam as Chief banking officer
- Kim Tae-yul as Hyun-soo
- Choi Joon-young as Hyun-soo (adult)
- Ryu Tae-ho as Chief presidential secretary
- Yoon Byung-hee as Manager Kim

=== Cameo appearance ===
- Lee Ho-jae as YS
- Han Ji-min as Lee Ah-ram

== Production ==
The read-through of the script occurred on December 7, 2017. Principal photography began on December 12, 2017.

== Release ==
The film was released in local cinemas on November 28, 2018. It was previously screened at the 71st Cannes International Film Festival's Marché du Film in May 2018. It was also screened at the 3rd International Film Festival & Awards Macau at the Special Presentations on December 9, 2018. Ahead of its local release, the film was sold to 17 territories including USA, Japan, Singapore, Taiwan, Indonesia, Hong Kong and Macao.

== Reception ==
=== Box office ===
On its opening day in South Korea, Default accumulated 301,324 viewers, taking nearly 40% of the box office and also taking the first place from Bohemian Rhapsody at the box office.

On the fifth day of its release, Default surpassed 1 million admissions, and during the first weekend of its release, Default garnered 1,573,441 viewers, securing the first place at the box office for its first weekend. Default became the highest November opening in the history of the Korean box office.

After topping the charts its first two weekends, it has since clocked up 3,755,233 admissions in its home country.

=== Critical response ===
On Korean review aggregator Naver Movie Database, the film holds an approval rating of 6.50 from critic reviews and 8.74 from the audience. The Hollywood Reporter's Clarence Tsui called it "An engaging multi-strand story about a nation in turmoil", and wrote, "[...] director Choi Kook-hee has sought to fill that void in a dramatic and furious exposition of causes and effects as seen through the eyes of his three protagonists, who experience the crisis up close in different ways. [...] Choi and his screenwriter Eom Seong-min turn mind-boggling macroeconomic concepts into emotions aimed at the viewers' heart. On the downside, this tends to lead to the film defaulting toward the simplistic and melodramatic." Pierce Conran from Screen Anarchy suggested that, "The film borrows heavily from recent global financial thrillers, stirs in a predictable dose of melodrama and attempts to tackle women's equality", but concluded, "Technically the film is polished, but as it deliberately seeks to evoke a glum atmosphere it comes off as a little drab."

== Awards and nominations ==
Awards	Category	Recipient	Result	Ref.
10th KOFRA Film Awards	Jury Award	Kim Hye-soo	Won	
19th Director's Cut Awards	Best Actress	Kim Hye-soo	Nominated	
19th Director's Cut Awards	Best Screenplay	Eom Seong-min	Nominated	
55th Baeksang Arts Awards	Best Actress	Kim Hye-soo	Nominated	
40th Blue Dragon Film Awards	Best Leading Actress	Kim Hye-soo	Nominated	
40th Blue Dragon Film Awards	Best Supporting Actor	Jo Woo-jin	Won	
40th Blue Dragon Film Awards	Best Screenplay	Eom Seong-min	Nominated	
6th Korean Film Producers Association Awards	Best Screenplay	Eom Seong-min	Won	
