= Sikgaek (manhwa) =

South Korean manhwa by Huh Young-man

Sikgaek (Korean: 식객; Hanja: 食客) is a South Korean manhwa written and illustrated by Huh Young-man. It was first serialized in the newspaper The Dong-a Ilbo in 2002, and later adapted into the 2007 film Le Grand Chef and the 2008 television series Gourmet. The comic explores the theme of cooking through the rivalry between two hansik (Korean cuisine) chefs, Seongchan (Korean: 성찬) and Bongju (Korean: 봉주).
