= Manhwa =

Korean comics

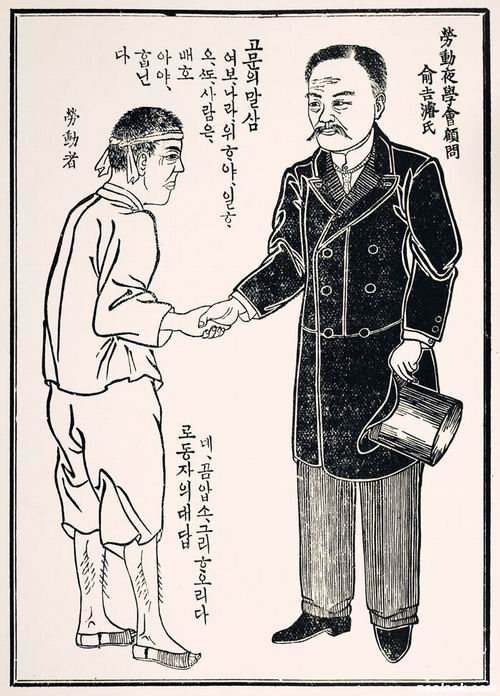
- The first woodcut manhwa, published in 1908

Korean name
- Hangul: 만화
- Hanja: 漫畫
- RR: manhwa
- MR: manhwa

Manhwa (Korean: 만화; Korean pronunciation: [manβʷa]) is the general Korean term for comics and print cartoons. Outside Korea, the term usually refers to Korean comics.

Modern manhwa has extended its reach to many other countries. These comics have branched outside of Korea through webtoons and have created an impact that has resulted in some movie, drama and television show adaptations. Many people mix up manga and manhwa. Unlike manga, manhwa is typically read in a vertical format.

== Characteristics ==
The author or artist of a manhwa is called a manhwaga (만화가; 漫畫家). They take on the task of creating a comic that fits a certain format. Manhwa is read in the same direction as English books, horizontally and from left to right, because Korean is normally written and read horizontally. It can also be written and read vertically from right to left, top to bottom. Webtoons tend to be structured differently in the way they are meant for scrolling where manga is meant to be looked at page by page. Manhwa, unlike their manga counterpart, is often in color when posted on the internet, but in black & white when in a printed format.

Manhwa art differs from manga and manhua as well with its distinct features. The bodies of characters are often realistically proportioned, while the faces remain unrealistic. Manhwas also often have very detailed clothing on their characters as well as intricate backgrounds. Webtoons use vertical scrolling to their advantage to demonstrate movement or the passage of time. Manhwa webtoons are also recognized for having simplified dialogue compared to print.

== Etymology and history ==
Linguistically, manhwa, manga (漫画) and manhua (漫画) all mean 'comics' in Korean, Japanese and Chinese respectively. Manga comes from the Japanese word 漫画, (katakana: マンガ; hiragana: まんが) which is composed of two kanji 漫 (man) meaning 'whimsical or impromptu' and 画 (ga) meaning 'pictures'. The same term is the root of the Korean word for comics, 'manhwa', and the Chinese word 'manhua'. The Korean manhwa, the Japanese manga and the Chinese phrase manhua are cognates (transl. "impromptu sketches") and their histories and influences intertwine with each other.

Originally the term manhua in Chinese vocabulary was an 18th-century term used in Chinese literati painting. The term manga (漫画) was used in Japan to mean "comics" in the late 19th century, when it became popular. Since then, manhua (漫画) and manhwa (만화; 漫畫) have also come to mean 'comics' in Chinese and Korean respectively.

Although in a traditional sense, the terms manga/manhua/manhwa had a similar meaning of comical drawing broadly, in English the terms manhwa and manhua generally designate the manga-inspired comic strips. Manhwaga were not culturally isolated, and the influx of manga into the Korean comics market had a strong effect on the art and content of many artists' manhwa.

Political cartoon slowly reemerged following the establishment of the Republic of Korea (commonly known as South Korea) in 1948. Popular artist Kim Yong-hwan started Korea's first comic magazine, Manhwa Haengjin, in 1948, but it was quickly shut down because the authorities disapproved of the cover.

During the Korean war, Manhwa was used with the aim of boosting the morale of the public, however there was also doctrine and propaganda on some manhwa leaflets and books, for example was "Hong Gil Dong". The popularity of comics rose during the 1950s and 1960s, creating diversity of styles and subject matter which led to the construction of new genres such as sunjeong (or soonjung), stories containing romance that are aimed at young women. Also around this time another more humorous genre, myeongnyang or happy comics had become popular in order to counteract gritty ones. Manhwabang (lit. comics room), comics cafés and stores that allowed readers to pay a set rate to sit and read comics were also introduced to the public, creating a positive atmosphere around the comics. In response to the increasing publication of comics, as well as social and political changes within South Korea, the government began to enforce censorship laws and, by the mid-1960s, created a comics distribution monopoly that further censored manhwa. Then the changing courses of manhwa history occurred during times of "Manhwa Revolution" when the authorities formed many commissions many times who oversees manhwa publications as well as community movements in order to suppress manhwa fanaticism among childrens and in order to address parents' concerns. Around this time was when Manhwa had come up in North Korea as well.

== Webtoons ==
Then in the early 2000s, the majority of Manhwa was transferred to online sources due to economic collapse that South Korea had experienced at the end of the millennium. The online publication of Manhwa significantly increased its popularity outside Korea. This led to the South Korean search portal to launch LINE Webtoon, a platform for distributing online Manhwa.

The term "Webtoon" (웹툰) is a portmanteau of the Korean words 웹 meaning web and 카툰 meaning cartoon. The term was first coined on 8 August 2000, by Chollian, one of South Korea's oldest and now discontinued internet service engines. Webtoons are the digital form of manhwa that first came into popularity in the early 2000s due to their free access and availability on the internet. It was also beneficial to creators because it helped them get around strict South Korean censorship laws. Webtoons encourage amateur writers to publish their own stories for others to read. Since their creation, webtoons have gained popularity around the globe and have even been adopted outside of Korea as another form of comic publication. This is credited to their unique format and pay model.

In 2014 WEBTOON's global website and mobile app were launched, revolutionizing the comic world's way of reading for entertainment. Also, around this time JunKoo Kim, the person that started LINE Webtoon, had reported that Webtoon was used in 60 countries, had 55 million monthly users, and 100 billion annual views.

== Manhwa outside of Korea ==
Nowadays, manhwa has reached many parts of the world. Websites such as Toptoon, a webtoon company from Korea that also has a global service in DayComcis (formerly known as ToptoonPlus), have many people accessing a vast variety of comics via their mobile devices. There are also places like WEBTOON that not only allow people to read original comics, but make them as well, therefore opening up this aspect of Korean culture for many people to participate in.

However, the relative obscurity of Korean culture in the Western world has caused the word manhwa to remain somewhat unknown in the Anglosphere. English translations of manhwa have been successful by targeting the manga and anime community, to the point that manhwa were marketed as manga by the American publisher Tokyopop.

=== United States ===
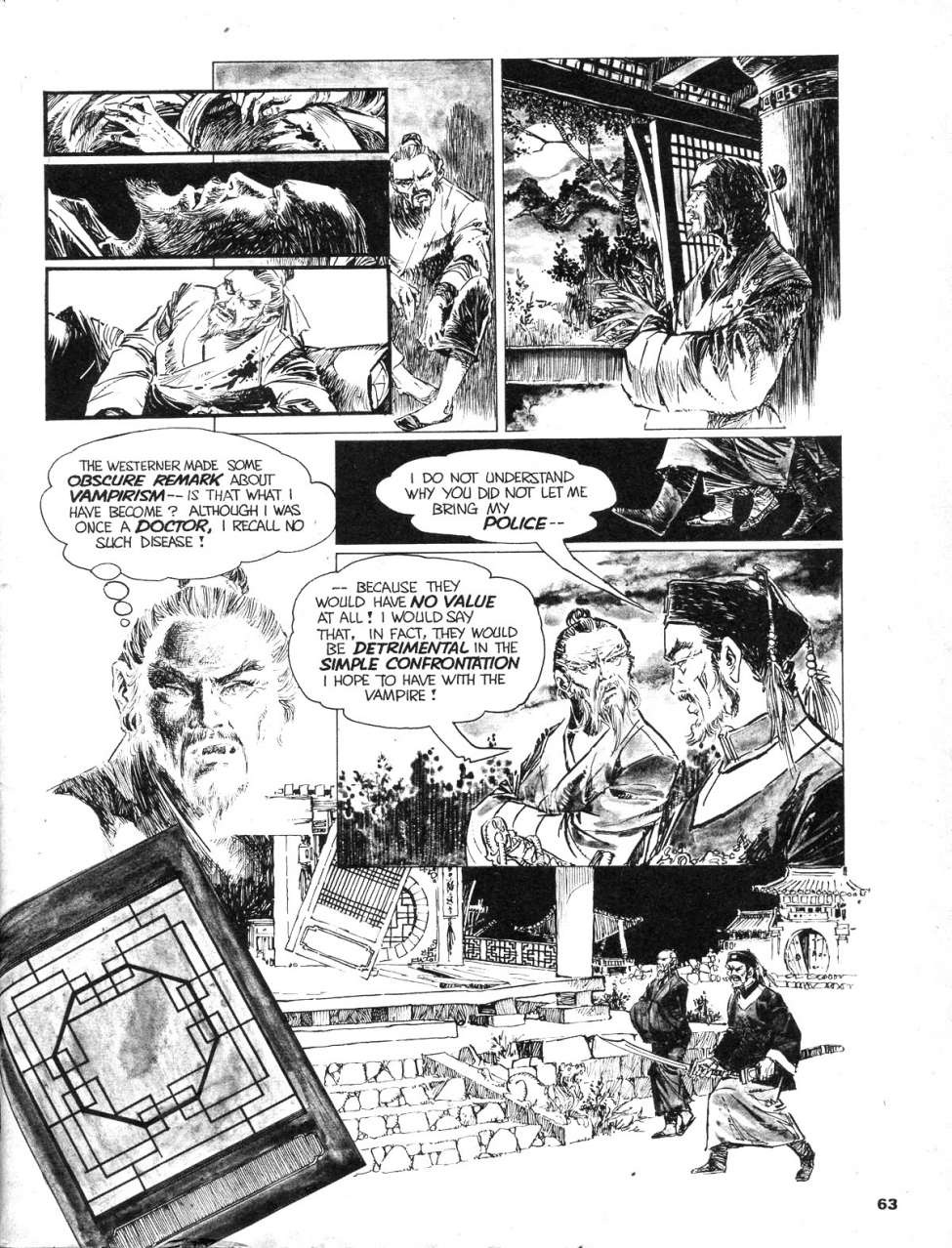
Psycho #24 (March 1975), Skywald Publications, art by Sanho Kim

Sanho Kim was the first manhwa artist that worked in the United States. During the 1960s and 1970s, he worked for publishers Charlton Comics, Warren Publishing, Iron Horse Publishing, Skywald Publications, DC Comics, and Marvel Comics.

According to journalist Paul Gravett, in 1987 Eastern Comics published the first original manhwas in the United States.

Due to the extreme popularity of manga's popularity in the Americas, many of the licensed titles acquired for the American market seek to emulate the popular elements of other successful series. Recently, long-running webtoons serialized via Internet portal sites (e.g. by Daum Media), like Lezhin Comics and personal homepages have become both the creative and popular destination among the younger generation in Korea. With manga proving to be both popular and commercially successful in Europe and the United States, a number of publishers imported and translated manhwa titles in the hope of reaching the same audience. The readability and left-to-right orientation of manhwa contributed to its growing popularity, as did the realism of the characters and the combination of Eastern and Western styles and mythologies.

== Media franchise ==
Animations based on Korean comics are still relatively rare (though there were several major hits in the late 1980s and early 90s with titles such as Dooly the Little Dinosaur and Fly! Superboard). However, live-action drama series and movie adaptations of manhwa have occurred more frequently in recent years. Full House in 2004 and Goong ("Palace" or "Princess Hours") in 2006 are prominent examples. Below is a list of manhwa titles adapted into television series, web series, films, etc. Not to be confused to another adapted works of adapted from Webtoons.

Title	Author	Format	Premiere	Notes	Reference
Meongteong-guli Heotmulkyeogi (멍텅구리 헛물켜기)	Lee Sang-hyeop and Ahn Jae-hong and Noh Soo-hyun	Film	1926		
Gobau (고바우)	Kim Seonghwan	Film	1958		
Walsun Ajimae (왈순 아지매)	Jeong Woon-kyung	Film	1963		
Geokkuligungwa Jangdaligun (거꾸리군과 장다리군)	Kim Seonghwan	Film	1977		
Bridal Mask (각시탈)	Huh Young-man	Film	1978		
Bridal Mask (각시탈)	Huh Young-man	Animated film	1986		
Bridal Mask (각시탈)	Huh Young-man	TV series	30 May 2012	Bridal Mask SPC; Pan Entertainment; KBS N	
Space Black Knight (우주 흑기사)	Huh Young-man	Animated film	1979		
Alien Baseball Team (외인구단)	Lee Hyun-se	Film	2 August 1986		
The Last Station (퇴역전선)	Huh Young-man	TV series	14 September 1987	Broadcast on MBC	
Dooly the Little Dinosaur (아기공룡 둘리)	Kim Soo-jung	Animation	7 October 1987 – 1989	Daewon Media; Broadcast on KBS	
Dooly the Little Dinosaur (아기공룡 둘리)	Kim Soo-jung	OVA	1995	Tooniverse	
Dooly the Little Dinosaur (아기공룡 둘리)	Kim Soo-jung	Animated film	24 July 1996	Dooly Nara (Dooly Nation), Seoul Movie	
Dooly the Little Dinosaur (아기공룡 둘리)	Kim Soo-jung	Animation	8 January 2009	Broadcast on SBS, Tooniverse	
The Chameleon's Poem (카멜레온의 시)	Huh Young-man	TV series	14 May 1988		
Yeongsimi (열네 살 영심이); Young-sim (영심이)	Bae Geum-taek	Film	29 July 1990		
Yeongsimi (열네 살 영심이); Young-sim (영심이)	Bae Geum-taek	Animation	5 October 1990	Daewon Media; Broadcast on KBS	
Yeongsimi (열네 살 영심이); Young-sim (영심이)	Bae Geum-taek	TV series	15 May 2023	The Great Show, MODT Studio; Broadcast on ENA	
Mr. Sohn (미스터손); Fly! Superboard (날아라 슈퍼보드)	Huh Young-man	Animation	15 August 1990, 1991, 1992, 1998, 2001	Hanho Heung-Up Co., Ltd. Broadcast on KBS1	
Asphalt Man (아스팔트 사나이)	Huh Young-man	TV series	17 May 1995	Broadcast on SBS	
48+1	Huh Young-man	Film	4 November 1995		
Beat (비트)	Huh Young-man	Film	3 May 1997		
Mr. Q (미스터 Q)	Huh Young-man	TV series	20 May 1998	Broadcast on SBS	
Nudlnude (누들누드)	Yang Young-soon	OVA	October 1998, 1999	Seoul Movie	
We Saw the Bird Lost in the Middle of the Road (우리는 길 잃은 작은 새를 보았다)	Hwang Mi-na	TV series	19 April 1999	Broadcast on KBS2	
Blade of the Phantom Master (신암행어사)	Youn In-wan and Yang Kyung-il	Animated film	4 December 2004	Oriental Light and Magic and Character Plan	
Full House (풀하우스)	Won Soo-yeon	TV series	14 July 2004	Kim Jong-hak Production	
Hammerboy (망치)	Huh Young-man	Animated film	6 August 2004		
Goong ("Palace" or "Princess Hours") (궁)	Park So-hee	TV series	11 January 2006	Eight Peaks	
Tajja (타짜)	Kim Se-yeong and Huh Young-man	Film	28 September 2006	Sidus FNH	
Tajja (타짜)	Kim Se-yeong and Huh Young-man	TV series	16 September 2008	Olive9 and Dong-ah Institute of Media and Arts	
War of Money (쩐의 전쟁)	Park In-kwon	TV series	16 May 2007	Victory Production; Broadcast on SBS	
War of Money (쩐의 전쟁)	Park In-kwon	TV series	7 March 2008	Broadcast on tvN	
War of Money (쩐의 전쟁)	Park In-kwon	TV series	6 January 2015	Kansai Television Co. Ltd.	
Sikgaek; Le Grand Chef; Gourmet (식객)	Huh Young-man	Film	1 November 2007	ShowEast Co Ltd	
Sikgaek; Le Grand Chef; Gourmet (식객)	Huh Young-man	TV series	17 June 2008	Broadcast on SBS	
Sikgaek; Le Grand Chef; Gourmet (식객)	Huh Young-man	Film	28 January 2010	IROOM Pictures	
Saranghae (사랑해)	Huh Young-man	TV series	7 April 2008	Broadcast on SBS	
Priest (프리스트)	Hyung Min-woo	Film	13 May 2011	Screen Gems	
The 7th Team (제7구단); Mr. Go (미스터 고)	Huh Young-man	Film	17 July 2013 (South Korea); 18 July 2013 (China)	Showbox/Mediaplex (South Korea); Huayi Brothers (China)	
Would You Like a Cup of Coffee? (허영만의 커피 한잔 할까요?)	Huh Young-man	Web series	24 October 2021	Broadcast on KakaoTV	
Acacia (아카시아)	Kim Dong-hwa, Han Seung-won	Webtoon	12 May 2023		

== Korean manhwa publishers ==
Note: select publishers only

- Daewon C.I.
- Haksan Culture Company
- Seoul Cultural Publishers
- Shinwon Agency Corporation

== North American manhwa imprints ==
- ADV Manga
- Dark Horse Manhwa
- DramaQueen
- DrMaster Publications
- Manta
- Media Blasters
- Netcomics
- NBM ComicsLit
- Seven Seas Entertainment
- SuperAni
- UDON's Korean Manhwa
- Yen Press's IZE PRESS

== See also ==
- Korean Wave
- List of manhwa
- Manhwabang
- Myeongnang manhwa
- North Korean animation
- South Korean animation
  - List of Korean animated series
  - List of Korean animated films
- Video gaming in South Korea
- Webtoon

== General and cited sources ==
- Cain, Geoffrey. "Will the Internet Kill the Manhwa Star?" The Far Eastern Economic Review, 6 November 2009
- Fukushima, Yoshiko (2013). Manga Discourse in Japan Theatre. Routledge. p. 19. ISBN 978-1-136-77273-3.
- Son Sang-ik (1999). 한국만화통사 1 (General History of Manhwa 1) (in Korean). Sigongsa. ISBN 89-7259-890-9.
- Hart, Christopher (2004). Manhwa mania: how to draw Korean comics. New York: Watson-Guptill Publications. ISBN 0-8230-2976-X.
- Kim Jinsu (2 June 2007). 개화기 일제의 시사만화 탄압 [The Japanese oppression on Sisa manhwa] (in Korean). Chammalo.
- 만화 (in Korean). Empas/ Encyclopædia Britannica.
- "Manhwa" (in Korean). Empas/ EncyKorea.
- Onoda, Natsu (2009). God of Comics: Osamu Tezuka and the Creation of Post-World War II Manga. University Press of Mississippi. p. 10. ISBN 978-1-60473-478-2.
- Petersen, Robert S. (2011). Comics, Manga, and Graphic Novels: A History of Graphic Narratives. ABC-CLIO. ISBN 978-0-313-36330-6.
- Prohl, Inken; Nelson, John K (2012). Handbook of Contemporary Japanese Religions. BRILL. p. 596. ISBN 978-90-04-23435-2.
- Rousmaniere, Nicole (2001). Births and Rebirths in Japanese Art : Essays Celebrating the Inauguration of the Sainsbury Institute for the Study of Japanese Arts and Cultures. Hotei Publishing. ISBN 978-90-74822-44-2.
- Sim Ji-hoon. "Korea Manhwa Museum". INISteel Webzine (in Korean).
- Sugiyama, Rika (2004). Comic artists — Asia : manga, manhwa, manhua. New York: Harper Design International. ISBN 0-06-058924-8.
- Thompson, Jason (2007). Manga: The Complete Guide. New York: Ballantine Books. ISBN 978-0-345-48590-8.
- Webb, Martin (28 May 2006). "Manga by any other name is..." The Japan Times.
- "Korean Comics in the U.S., Part 1, Comic-Con International 2004", Jade Magazine.com, Sep. 2004
- "Korean Comics in the U.S., Part 2, Manhwa Sampler", Jade Magazine.com, Sep. 2004
- "Sang-Sun Park, Les Bijoux Comic Artist", Sequential Tart.com, Aug. 2004
- Manhwa site for "Siya Ben"
- Manhwa site for "Demon Diary" ({{Korean|hangul=마왕일기|labels=no}})
- "Infinity Studios and Manhwa", Anime Tourist.com, 16 June 2004
- Our Toys, Our Selves: Robot Taekwon V and South Korean Identity
- Nettruyen
