= Huh Young-man =

South Korean manhwa artist

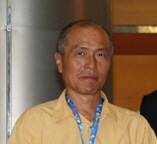
- Born: Huh Hyeong-man; June 26, 1947 (age 79); Yeosu, South Korea
- Occupation: Manhwa artist
- Years active: 1974-present
- Spouse: Lee Myeong-ja

Korean name
- Hangul: 허형만
- Hanja: 許亨萬
- RR: Heo Hyeongman
- MR: Hŏ Hyŏngman

Pen name
- Hangul: 허영만
- Hanja: 許英萬
- RR: Heo Yeongman
- MR: Hŏ Yŏngman

Huh Young-man (born June 26, 1947) is a South Korean manhwa artist.

== Early life ==
Huh Young-man was born Huh Hyeong-man in present-day Yeosu, a far southern coastal city of what is now South Jeolla Province, South Korea in 1947. He was the third child of eight children born to father Heo Jong (허종) and mother Park Ok-jeong (박옥정). Before and after the liberation of Korea from Japan in 1945, Huh's father had worked as a local policeman. When the Yeosu Rebellion occurred in 1948, Huh's family was in danger of being killed by the rebels. In contrast to Huh's father, his uncle was a communist, so that Huh's family was ironically protected by both sides. However, Huh was later told that he and his mother could've been killed during an incident in which some communists captured his father. This political conflict strongly influenced Huh's works such as Oh, Han River and Tajja.

After the Korean War was over, Huh's father worked for a while as an administrative officer at the Yeosu Office of Education, then later started his own business. Huh's mother ran a kitchenware store which became successful since Yeosu served as a trading base between neighboring islands.

Huh had wanted to study Western painting at university but because his father's anchovy fishery business was declining, he gave up his dream. Instead, Huh entered the manhwa world as an apprentice to a cartoonist.

== Career ==
In 1974, Huh debuted with In Search for Home (Jipeul chajaseo) through a competition seeking new cartoonists hosted by the Sonyeon Hankook Ilbo (Boy's Korean Times). His next comic, action-adventure Gaksital (lit. "Bridal Mask") was a big success, and Huh became famous. Since then, Huh's works have been recognized for their literary value and have gained wide popularity among the public. Several have been serialized in local dailies, including Sikgaek (lit. "Gourmet") for The Dong-a Ilbo, and Tajja and Saranghae (lit. "I Love You") for Sports Chosun. His comics have also been adapted into films and television series.

== Works ==
Note: the whole section is referenced.

- 빛 좋은 개살구 (1974)
- 총소리 (1974)
- Gaksital (각시탈, 1974)
- 태양을 향해 달려라 (1979)
- 짚신왕자 (1980)
- Spider Silk (무당거미, 1981)
- 사마귀 (1982)
- 쇠퉁소 (1982)
- 태평양은 알고 있다 (1982)
- 10번 타자 (1982)
- 변칙복서 (1983)
- 욕망의 수레바퀴 (1983)
- 오늘은 마요일 (1983)
- 황금충 (1984)
- The 7th Team (제7구단, 1984)
- 1+1+1 (1985)
- 도롱뇽 구단의 골칫덩이들 (1985)
- 아스팔트 위의 강풍 (1985)
- 두 얼굴 (1985)
- 단막극을 위한 소나타 (1986)
- 날아라 슈퍼보드 (1986)
- Chameleon's Poem (카멜레온의 시, 1986)
- 동체이륙 (1987)
- 2시간 10분 (1987)
- 담배 한 개비 (1987)
- 링의 골치덩이들 (1987)
- Lonely Guitar Man (고독한 기타맨, 1987)
- 질 수 없다 (1987)
- Oh! Han River (오! 한강, 1987, writer: Kim Se-yeong (김세영))
- 허슬러 (1988)
- 대머리 감독님 (1988)
- 야구타령 (1988)
- 망치 (1988)
- Wall (벽, 1988)
- 퇴색공간 (1988)
- 48+1 (1989)
- 형제 (1989)
- Mr. Hand (미스터 손, 1989)
- 0점 인간 (1990)
- 미로학습 (1990)
- 세일즈 맨 (1990)
- 19번 홀 (1990)
- Asphalt Man (아스팔트의 사나이, 1991)
- 무저갱 / 원제:벌레구멍 (1992)
- 굿바이 아메리카 (1992)
- 들개 이빨 (1992)
- Mr. Q (미스터 Q, 1992)
- Beat (비트, 1994)
- Salesman (세일즈맨, 1994)
- 닭목을 비틀면 새벽은 안온다 (1994)
- 시의 밤송이 (1995)
- Saranghae (1999, writer: Kim Se-yeong)
- Tajja (타짜, 2000, writer: Kim Se-yeong)
- Salamander (살라망드르, 2000, writer: Kim Se-yeong)
- Sikgaek (식객, 2003)
- Boy's king Mangchi (꼬마대장 망치, 2004)
- Hammerboy Mangchi (해머보이 망치, 2004)
- Rich's Dictionary (부자사전, 2005)
- Appearance (꼴, 2008)
- Superboard (날아라 슈퍼보드)
- Heo Heo Dongui Bogam (허허 동의보감, 2013)
- How About a Cup of Coffee? (커피 한잔 할까요?, 2015, co-writer: Lee Ho-joon)

== Screen adaptations ==
=== Live action ===
==== Film ====
- A Man with Seven Faces (1978)
- The Chameleon's Poem (1988)
- 48+1 (1995)
- Beat (1997)
- Tazza: The High Rollers (2006)
- Le Grand Chef (2007)
- Le Grand Chef 2: Kimchi Battle (2010)
- Mr. Go (2013)

==== Television drama ====
- The Last Station (MBC, 1987)
- Asphalt Man (SBS, 1995)
- Mr. Q (SBS, 1998)
- Saranghae (SBS, 2008)
- Gourmet (SBS, 2008)
- Tazza (SBS, 2008)
- Bridal Mask (KBS2, 2012)

==== Web drama ====
- Would You Like a Cup of Coffee? (KakaoTV, 2021)

=== Animated ===
==== Film ====
- Space Black Knight (1979)
- Gaksital (1986)
- Hammerboy (2004)

==== Television series ====
- Mr. Sohn (KBS1, 1990)
- Mr. Sohn (KBS1, 1991)
- Mr. Sohn (KBS1, 1992)
- Mr. Sohn (KBS1, 1998)
- Mr. Sohn (KBS1, 2001)

=== State honors ===
Name of country, year given, and name of honor
Country	Year	Honor Or Award	Ref.
South Korea (Note: Honors are given at the Korean Popular Culture and Arts Awards, arranged by the Korea Creative Content Agency and hosted by the Ministry of Culture, Sports and Tourism. They are awarded to those who have contributed to the arts and South Korea's pop culture.)	2022	Order of Cultural Merit, 3rd Class	
