= Sidus Pictures =

South Korean film production and distribution company

Sidus Corporation
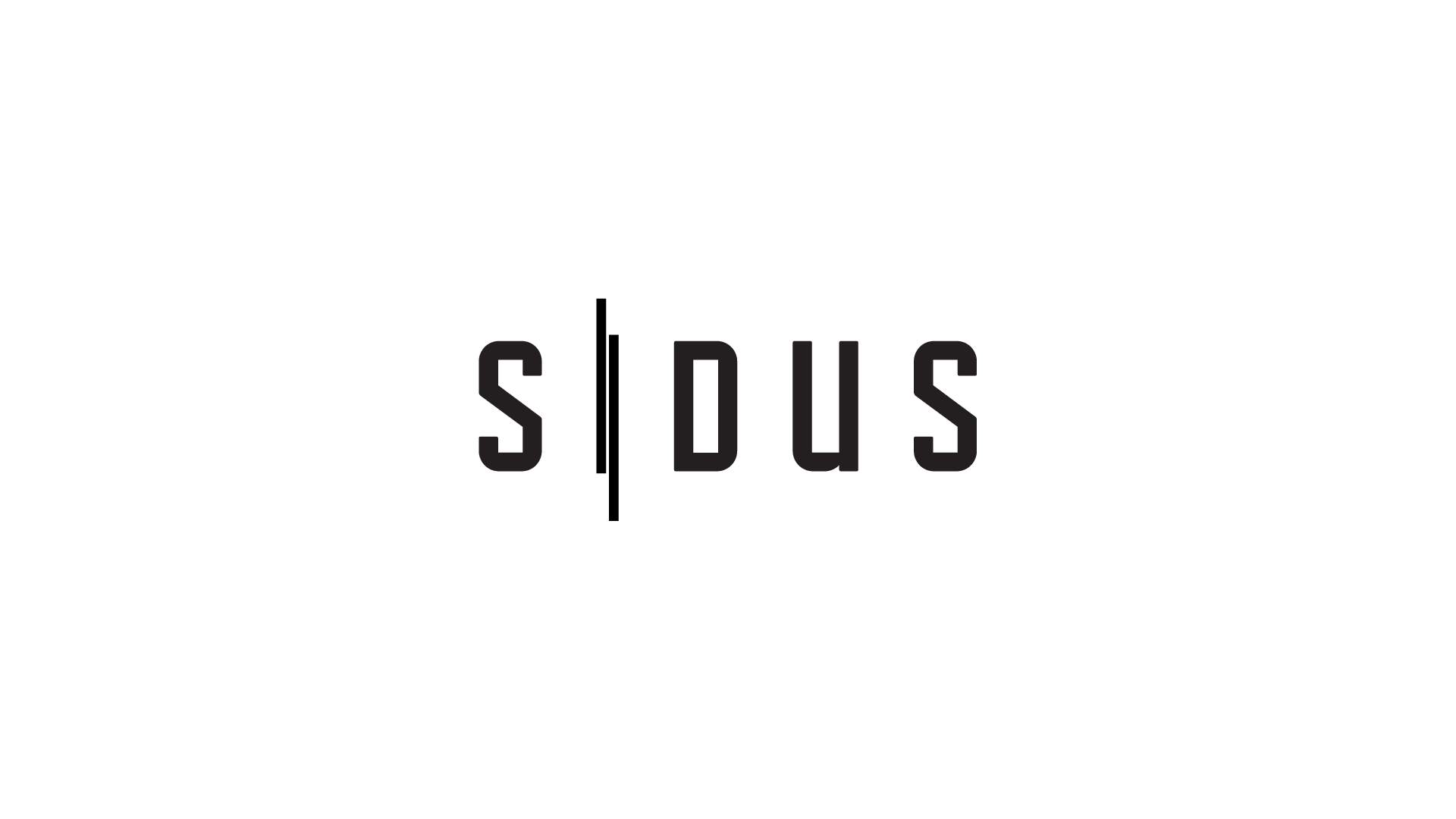
- Native name: 싸이더스
- Formerly: Uno Film (1995-2000)
- Type: Subsidiary
- Industry: Film
- Founded: September 1995; 31 years ago
- Founder: James Hyung Soon Kim
- Headquarters: Nonhyeon-dong, Gangnam District, Seoul, South Korea
- Area served: South Korea, International
- Key people: Handae Rhee (CEO)
- Services: distribution, film production
- Parent: KT Corporation (2005-2014); Locus Corporation (2014-2023); WYSIWYG Studios (since 2023)
- Subsidiaries: SidusHQ (until 2002)

Sidus (Korean: 싸이더스 픽쳐스, formerly called Uno Film, Sidus and Sidus FNH) is a film production and distribution company based in Seoul, South Korea. Established in 1995, the company has distributed and produced over 70 films since their founding.

== History ==
Sidus was founded by James Hyung Soon Kim after taking over Uno Films, which began in 1995. The company changed its name to Sidus in 2000 and merged with EBM, a talent management firm. The talent management and film production divisions split in 2005, with the former becoming iHQ (also known as SidusHQ). Also in 2005, Sidus was acquired by KT corporation, under which Sidus began investing in and distributing domestic and foreign films. In 2014, Sidus was acquired by Locus Corporation, which is headed by Sidus's original founder Kim.

Sidus has produced over 70 films and continues to work in film production, distribution and investment on an international scale.

== Filmography ==
=== Films ===
Year	Title	Director
1995	Money in My Account	Kim Sang-jin
1996	The Rules of a Gangster	Kim Sang-jin
1997	Beat	Kim Sung-su
1997	Motel Cactus	Ki-Yong Park
1998	Girls' Night Out	Im Sang-soo
1998	Christmas in August	Hur Jin-ho
1999	Attack the Gas Station	Kim Sang-jin
1999	City of the Rising Sun	Kim Sung-su
1999	Phantom the Submarine	Gyung-chun Min
2000	Il Mare	Lee Hyun-seung
2000	Barking Dogs Never Bite	Bong Joon-ho
2000	Kilimanjaro	Seung-ook Oh
2000	The Happy Funeral Director	Mun-il Jang
2001	Summertime	Jae-ho Park
2001	The Warriors	Kim Sung-su
2001	One Fine Spring Day	Hur Jin-ho
2001	Indian Summer	Hyo-jeong No
2001	Volcano High	Kim Tae-kyun
2001	Last Present	Oh Ki-hwan
2001	I Wish I Had a Wife	Park Heung-sik
2001	Kick the Moon	Sang-Jin Kim
2002	Road Movie	In-shik Kim
2002	Jungle Juice	Min-Ho Cho
2002	Marriage is a Crazy Thing	Yoo Ha
2002	Funny Movie	Kyu-sung Jang
2002	No Blood No Tears	Ryoo Seung-wan
2002	Ardor	Byun Young-joo
2003	Singles	Chil-in Kwon
2003	Save the Green Planet	Jang Joon-hwan
2003	My Teacher Mr. Kim	Kyu-sung Jang
2003	Memories of Murder	Bong Joon-ho
2004	Arahan	Ryoo Seung-wan
2004	Lovely Rivals	Jang Kyu-sung
2004	Superstar Mr. Gam	Jong-hyun Kim
2004	Spirit of Jeet Keun Do	Ha Yoo
2004	Flying Boys	Byun Young-joo
2004	Rikidozan	Song Hae-sung
2004	A Moment to Remember	John H. Lee
2004	The Big Swindle	Choi Dong-hoon
2004	Romance of Their Own	Kim Tae-kyun
2005	Blood Rain	Kim Dae-seung
2005	Heaven's Soldiers	Min Joon-ki
2005	Antarctic Journal	Yim Pil-sung
2005	Rules of Dating	Han Jae-rim
2005	Love is a Crazy Thing	Seok-geun Oh
2005	Boy Goes to Heaven	Tae-yeong Yun
2006	Bar Legends	Beom-gu Cho
2006	My Scary Girl	Jae-gon Son
2006	Old Miss Diary	Seok-yun Kim
2006	Seducing Mr. Perfect	Sang-woo Kim
2006	Cruel Winter Blues	Lee Jeong-beom
2006	Tazza: The High Rollers	Choi Dong-hoon
2006	Like a Virgin	Lee Hae-young
2006	Lump of Sugar	Lee Hwan-kyung
2006	A Dirty Carnival	Yoo Ha
2006	Love Me Not	Lee Cheol-ha
2006	For Horowitz	Kwon Hyung-jin
2006	Over the Border	Ahn Pan-seok
2006	Moodori	Hyeong-seon Lee
2007	Small Town Rivals	Kyu-sung Jang
2007	Femme Fatale	Kyeong-hun Kang
2007	Miss Gold Digger	Yong-jib Park
2007	Love Exposure	Eon-hie Lee
2008	The Accidental Gangster	Kyun-dong Yeo
2008	Truck	Kwon Hyung-jin
2008	Radio Dayz	Gi-ho Ha
2008	The Way	Seok-woo Kim
2009	The Sword With No Name	Yong-gyun Kim
2009	Kiss Me, Kill Me	Yang Jong-Hyun
2010	Wedding Dress	Kwon Hyung-jin
2010	Grand Prix	Yang Yun-ho
2010	Villain and Widow	Jae-gon Son
2010	The Housemaid	Im Sang-soo
2011	Countdown	Huh Jong-Ho
2011	The Showdown	Park Hoon-jung
2011	Couples	Jeong Yong-ki
2014	Tazza: The Hidden Card	Kang Hyeong-cheol
2019	Tazza: One Eyed Jack	Kwon Oh-kwang
2020	Time to Hunt	Yoon Sung-hyun

=== TV and web series ===
Year	Title	Director	Platform
2022	Dr. Park's Clinic	Seo Jung-beom	TVING
2025	S Line	Ahn Joo-young	Wavve
2026	The Substitute	Park So-yeon	TVING
