= Tajja =

Tajja (Korean: 타짜) is a Korean slang term meaning "professional gambler." It is also the title of a South Korean comic illustrated by famed Korean cartoonist Huh Young-man and written by author Kim Se-yeong. It was first serialized in the newspaper Sports Chosun in 2000, and upon its publication, became a bestseller among adults of different age groups and both genders. It was later adapted into the 2006 film Tazza: The High Rollers and the 2008 television series Tazza.

The story revolves around an impulsive young man from Namwon who loses his family's money when he is conned by card sharps. To win his money back, he takes an apprenticeship under an older card master, and gets drawn into the society of high-stakes gambling.
