= Janghwa Hongryeon jeon (disambiguation) =

Janghwa Hongryeon jeon is a Korean folktale.

Janghwa Hongryeon jeon may also refer to:

- Janghwa Hongryeon jeon (1924 film)
- Janghwa Hongryeon jeon (1936 film)
- Janghwa Hongryeon jeon (1956 film)
- Janghwa Hongryeon jeon (1972 film)
- The Story of Jang-hwa and Hong-ryeon (1962 film)
