= Blue Dragon Film Award for Best New Actress =

South Korean film awards

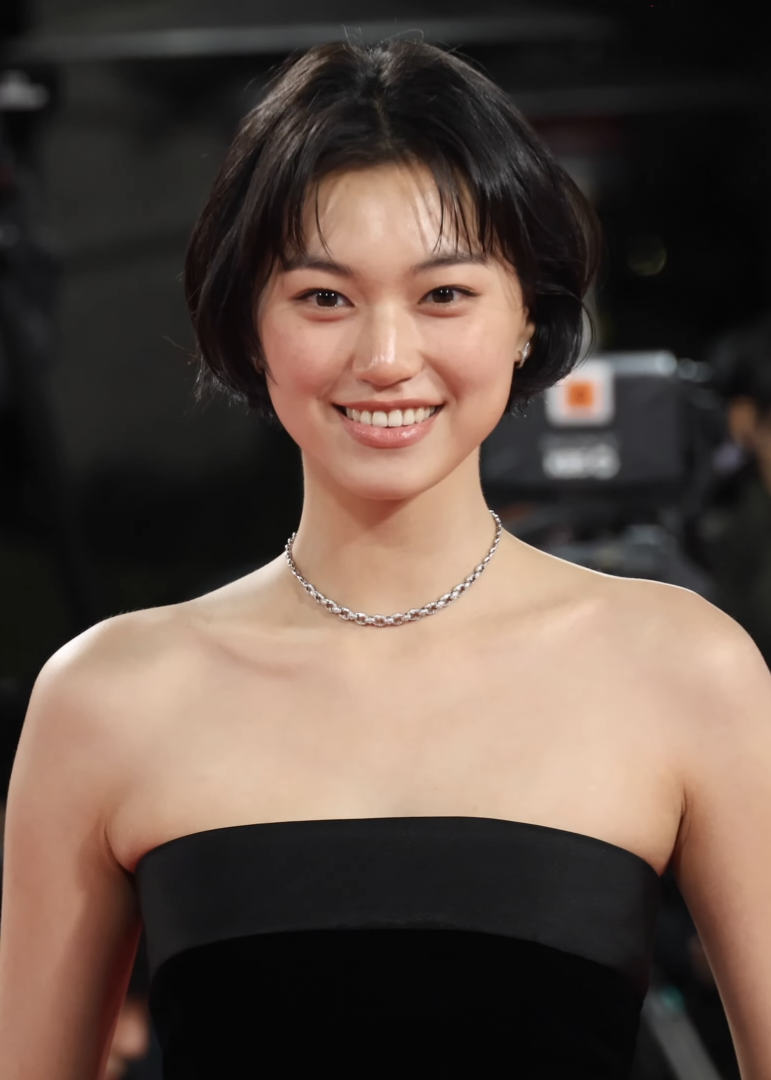
- Kim Do-yeon, the winner in 2025
- Description: Best New Actress
- Country: South Korea
- Presented by: Blue Dragon Film Awards
- First award: 1963
- Winner: Kim Do-yeon
- Website: www.blueaward.co.kr

The Blue Dragon Film Award for Best New Actress is one of the awards that is presented annually at the Blue Dragon Film Awards by Sports Chosun, which is typically held at the end of the year.

== Winners ==
=== 1960s – 1970s ===
Year	Winner	Film	Original title	Role(s)
1965 (3rd)	Moon Hee	Heukmaek	흑맥	Mi Soon
1966 (4th)	Nam Jeong-im	Affection	유정	
1967 (5th)	Not awarded to actress			
1969 (6th)	Not awarded			
1970 (7th)	Kim Chang-sook	Army Unit 124	124군부대	
1971 (8th)	Oh Yu-gyeong	Secret Woman	숨겨논 여자	
1971 (8th)	Kim Cheong-ja	Is Your Husband Like This Too?	댁의 아빠도 이렇습니까	
1972 (9th)	Na Ha-yeong	My Life, Once More	이 생명 다시 한번	
1972 (9th)	Park Ji-young		약한 자여	
1973 (10th)	Woo Yeon-jeong	Me, Myself and I	나와 나	
1973 (10th)	Jeon Yeong	Light of the Port	항구의 등불	

=== 1990s ===
Year	Winner	Film	Original title	Role(s)
1990 (11th)	Choi Jin-sil	Nambugun: North Korean Partisan in South Korea	남부군	Park Min-ja
1991 (12th)	Kim Geum-yong	Beyond the Mountain	산산이 부서진 이름이여	Myo-heun
1992 (13th)	Oh Yeon-soo	General's Son III	장군의 아들 3	Jang Eun-shil
1993 (14th)	Oh Jeong-hae	Seopyeonje	서편제	Song-hwa
1994 (15th)	Jung Sun-kyung	To You from Me	너에게 나를 보낸다	Ba-ji
1995 (16th)	Lee Ji-eun	My Dear Keum-hong	금홍아 금홍아	Keum-hong
1996 (17th)	Lee Hye-eun	Corset	코르셋	Sun-joo
1996 (17th)	Lee Jung-hyun	A Petal	꽃잎	Girl
1997 (18th)	Jeon Do-yeon	The Contact	접속	Soo-hyeon
1997 (18th)	Kim So-yeon	Change	체인지	Ko Eun-bi
1997 (18th)	Kim Hee-sun	Repechage	패자부활전	Eun-hye
1997 (18th)	Lee Su-a	Poison	쁘아종	Seo-ri
1997 (18th)	Choi Ji-woo	The Hole	올가미	Su-jin
1998 (19th)	Kim Yeo-jin	Girls' Night Out	처녀들의 저녁식사	Soon
1998 (19th)	Go Ho-kyung	The Quiet Family	조용한 가족	Kang Mina
1998 (19th)	Kim Gyu-ri	Whispering Corridors	여고괴담	Lim Ji-oh
1998 (19th)	Myung Se-bin	Scent of a Man	남자의 향기	Shin Eun-hye
1998 (19th)	Oh Yoon-hong	The Power of Kangwon Province	강원도의 힘	Ji-sook
1999 (20th)	Lee Jae-eun	Yellow Hair	노랑머리	Yu-na
1999 (20th)	Kim Yoon-jin	Shiri	쉬리	Lee Myung-hyun / Lee Bang-hee
1999 (20th)	Kim Hyun-joo	Calla	카라	Yoon Soo-jin
1999 (20th)	Jang Jin-young	Ghost in Love	자귀모	Lee Young-eun
1999 (20th)	Han Go-eun	City of the Rising Sun	태양은 없다	Mimi

=== 2000s ===
Year	Winner	Film	Original title	Role(s)
2000 (21st)	Bae Doona	Barking Dogs Never Bite	플란다스의 개	Park Hyun-nam
2000 (21st)	Kim Tae-yeon	Lies	거짓말	Y
2000 (21st)	Park Ye-jin	Memento Mori	여고괴담 두번째 이야기	Hyo-shin
2000 (21st)	Lee Eun-ju	Virgin Stripped Bare by Her Bachelors	오! 수정	Yang Su-jeong
2000 (21st)	Lee Ji-hyeon	La Belle	미인	Woman
2001 (22nd)	Lee Yo-won	Take Care of My Cat	고양이를 부탁해	Shin Hae-joo
2001 (22nd)	Kim Bo-kyung	Friend	친구	Jin-sook
2001 (22nd)	Kim Ho-jung	Nabi	나비	Anna Kim
2001 (22nd)	Ok Ji-young	Take Care of My Cat	고양이를 부탁해	Seo Ji-young
2001 (22nd)	Jo Eun-ji	Tears	눈물	Ran
2002 (23rd)	Moon So-ri	Oasis	오아시스	Han Gong-ju
2002 (23rd)	Seo Won	Bad Guy	나쁜 남자	Sun-hwa
2002 (23rd)	Son Ye-jin	Lovers' Concerto	연애소설	Shim Soo-in / Gyung-hee
2002 (23rd)	Kim Sun-a	Wet Dreams	몽정기	Yoo-ri
2002 (23rd)	Kim Jung-eun	Marrying the Mafia	가문의 영광	Jang Jin-kyeong
2003 (24th)	Im Soo-jung	A Tale of Two Sisters	장화, 홍련	Bae Su-mi
2003 (24th)	Moon Geun-young	A Tale of Two Sisters	장화, 홍련	Bae Su-yeon
2003 (24th)	Park Han-byul	Wishing Stairs	여고괴담 3: 여우계단	Kim So-hee
2003 (24th)	Song Ji-hyo	Wishing Stairs	여고괴담 3: 여우계단	Yun Jin-sung
2003 (24th)	Uhm Ji-won	Mutt Boy	똥개	Kim Jung-ae
2004 (25th)	Soo Ae	A Family	가족	Jeong-eun
2004 (25th)	Kim Hyo-jin	Everybody Has Secrets	누구나 비밀은 있다	Han Mi-yeong
2004 (25th)	Yoon So-yi	Arahan	아라한 장풍 대작전	Eui-jin
2004 (25th)	Jang Shin-young	Springtime	꽃피는 봄이 오면	Su-yeon
2004 (25th)	Han Ga-in	Once Upon a Time in High School	말죽거리 잔혹사	Eun-joo
2005 (26th)	Kim Ji-soo	This Charming Girl	여자, 정혜	Jeong-hae
2005 (26th)	Han Ji-hye	My Boyfriend Is Type B	B형 남자친구	Ha-mi
2005 (26th)	Jo Yi-jin	The Aggressives	태풍태양	Han-joo
2005 (26th)	Jung Yu-mi	Blossom Again	사랑니	Cho In-young
2005 (26th)	Kim Ok-vin	Voice	여고괴담 4: 목소리	Young-Eun
2006 (27th)	Go Ah-sung	The Host	괴물	Park Hyun-seo
2006 (27th)	Choi Jung-yoon	Radio Star	라디오 스타	Kang Seok-young
2006 (27th)	Choo Ja-hyun	Bloody Tie	사생결단	Ji-young
2006 (27th)	Kim Ah-joong	When Romance Meets Destiny	광식이 동생 광태	Lee Kyung-jae
2006 (27th)	Park Si-yeon	The Fox Family	구미호 가족	Older daughter fox
2007 (28th)	Jung Ryeo-won	Two Faces of My Girlfriend	두 얼굴의 여친	Ani / Hani / Yu-ri
2007 (28th)	Han Ji-min	The Cut	해부학교실	Seon-hwa
2007 (28th)	Hwang Bo-ra	Skeletons in the Closet	좋지 아니한가	Shim Yong-sun
2007 (28th)	Kim Tae-hee	The Restless	중천	So-hwa / Yon-hwa
2007 (28th)	Lee Tae-ran	Love Exposure	어깨너머의 연인	Yoon Hee-soo
2008 (29th)	Han Ye-seul	Miss Gold Digger	용의주도 미스 신	Shin Mi-soo
2008 (29th)	Han Eun-jung	The Divine Weapon	신기전	Hong-ri
2008 (29th)	Hwang Woo-seul-hye	Crush and Blush	미쓰 홍당무	Lee Yoo-ri
2008 (29th)	Lee Ha-na	Le Grand Chef	식객	Jin-su
2008 (29th)	Seo Woo	Crush and Blush	미쓰 홍당무	Seo Jong-hee
2009 (30th)	Kim Kkot-bi	Breathless	똥파리	Yeon-hee
2009 (30th)	Park Bo-young	Scandal Makers	과속스캔들	Hwang Jeong-nam / Hwang Jae-in
2009 (30th)	Kang Ye-won	Tidal Wave	해운대	Kim Hee-mi
2009 (30th)	Oh Yeon-seo	A Blood Pledge	여고괴담 5: 동반자살	Yoo-jin
2009 (30th)	Sunwoo Sun	Running Turtle	거북이 달린다	Kyeong-joo

=== 2010s ===
Year	Winner	Film	Original title	Role(s)
2010 (31st)	Lee Min-jung	Cyrano Agency	시라노; 연애조작단	Kim Hee-joong
2010 (31st)	Shim Eun-kyung	The Quiz Show Scandal	퀴즈왕	Kim Yeo-na
2010 (31st)	Jo Yeo-jeong	The Servant	방자전	Chun-hyang
2010 (31st)	Ji Sung-won	Bedevilled	김복남 살인사건의 전말	Hae-won
2010 (31st)	Han Hye-jin	No Mercy	용서는 없다	Min Seo-young
2011 (32nd)	Moon Chae-won	War of the Arrows	최종병기 활	Choi Ja-in
2011 (32nd)	Kang So-ra	Sunny	써니	Ha Chun-hwa
2011 (32nd)	Baek Jin-hee	Foxy Festival	페스티발	Ja-hye
2011 (32nd)	Shin Se-kyung	Hindsight	푸른소금	Jo Se-bin
2011 (32nd)	Yoo Da-in	Re-encounter	혜화,동	Hye-hwa
2012 (33rd)	Kim Go-eun	Eungyo	은교	Han Eun-gyo
2012 (33rd)	Go Ara	Papa	파파	June
2012 (33rd)	Bae Suzy	Architecture 101	건축학개론	Yang Seo-yeon
2012 (33rd)	Jung Ji-yoon	Traffickers	공모자들	Chae-hee
2012 (33rd)	Han Ye-ri	As One	코리아	Yu Sun-bok
2013 (34th)	Park Ji-soo	Mai Ratima	마이 라띠마	Mai Ratima
2013 (34th)	Nam Bo-ra	Don't Cry Mommy	돈 크라이 마미	Eun-ah
2013 (34th)	Nam Ji-hyun	Hwayi: A Monster Boy	화이: 괴물을 삼킨 아이	Yoo-kyung
2013 (34th)	Lee Na-ra	Moebius	뫼비우스	Mother / Mistress
2013 (34th)	Jung Eun-chae	Nobody's Daughter Haewon	누구의 딸도 아닌 해원	Haewon
2014 (35th)	Kim Sae-ron	A Girl at My Door	도희야	Sun Do-hee
2014 (35th)	Kim Yoo-jung	Thread of Lies	우아한 거짓말	Kim Hwa-yeon
2014 (35th)	Ryu Hye-young	My Dictator	나의 독재자	Yeo-jung
2014 (35th)	Esom	Scarlet Innocence	마담 뺑덕	Deok-yi
2014 (35th)	Lim Ji-yeon	Obsessed	인간중독	Jong Ga-heun
2015 (36th)	Lee Yoo-young	The Treacherous	간신	Seoljungmae
2015 (36th)	Kwon So-hyun	Madonna	마돈나	Jang Mi-na
2015 (36th)	Kim Seol-hyun	Gangnam Blues	강남 1970	Kang Seon-hye
2015 (36th)	Park So-dam	The Silenced	경성학교: 사라진 소녀들	Hong Yeon-deok / Kazue
2015 (36th)	Lee Yu-bi	Twenty	스물	So-hee
2016 (37th)	Kim Tae-ri	The Handmaiden	아가씨	Maid / Nam Sook-hee
2016 (37th)	Kang Ha-na	Spirits' Homecoming	귀향	Jung-min
2016 (37th)	Kim Hwan-hee	The Wailing	곡성	Hyo-jin
2016 (37th)	Yoon Joo	A Break Alone	나홀로 휴가	Si-yeon
2016 (37th)	Jeong Ha-dam	Steel Flower	스틸 플라워	Ha-dam
2017 (38th)	Choi Hee-seo	Anarchist from Colony	박열	Kaneko Fumiko
2017 (38th)	Lee Min-ji	Jane	꿈의 제인	So-hyun
2017 (38th)	Lee Sang-hee	Our Love Story	연애담	Yoon-ju
2017 (38th)	Lee Soo-kyung	Yongsoon	용순	Yong-soon
2017 (38th)	Im Yoon-ah	Confidential Assignment	공조	Park Min-young
2018 (39th)	Kim Da-mi	The Witch: Part 1. The Subversion	마녀	Ja-yoon
2018 (39th)	Kim Ga-hee	Park Hwa-Young	박화영	Park Hwa-Young
2018 (39th)	Park Ji-hyun	Gonjiam: Haunted Asylum	곤지암	Ji-Hyun
2018 (39th)	Jeon Yeo-been	After My Death	죄 많은 소녀	Young-hee
2018 (39th)	Jeon Jong-seo	Burning	버닝	Shin Hae-mi
2019 (40th)	Kim Hye-jun	Another Child	미성년	Joo-ri
2019 (40th)	Park Ji-hu	House of Hummingbird	벌새	Eun-hee
2019 (40th)	Park Hye-su	Swing Kids	스윙키즈	Yang Pan-rae
2019 (40th)	Lee Jae-in	Svaha: The Sixth Finger	사바하	Geum-hwa
2019 (40th)	Choi Soo-young	Miss & Mrs. Cops	걸캅스	Jang-mi

=== 2020s ===
Year	Winner	Film	Original title	Role(s)
2020 (41st)	Kang Mal-geum	Lucky Chan-sil	찬실이는 복도 많지	Lee Chan-sil
2020 (41st)	Kim So-hye	Moonlit Winter	윤희에게	Sae-bom
2020 (41st)	Shin Hyun-been	Beasts Clawing at Straws	지푸라기라도 잡고 싶은 짐승들	Mi-ran
2020 (41st)	Shin Hye-sun	Innocence	결백	Ahn Jung-in
2020 (41st)	Lee Joo-young	Baseball Girl	야구소녀	Joo Soo-in
2021 (42nd)
2021 (42nd)	Gong Seung-yeon	Aloners	혼자 사는 사람들	Jin Ah
2021 (42nd)	Lee Yoo-mi	Young Adult Matters	어른들은 몰라요	Se-jin
2021 (42nd)	Bang Min-ah	Snowball	최선의 삶	Kang-i
2021 (42nd)	Jung Soo-jung	More Than Family	애비규환	Kim To-il
2021 (42nd)	Roh Jeong-eui	The Day I Died: Unclosed Case	내가 죽던 날	Seo-jin
2022 (43rd)
2022 (43rd)	Kim Hye-yoon	The Girl on a Bulldozer	불도저에 탄 소녀	Goo Hye-young
2022 (43rd)	Shin Si-ah	The Witch: Part 2. The Other One	마녀(魔女)	Ark 1 Datum point
2022 (43rd)	Lee Ji-eun	Broker	브로커	So-young
2022 (43rd)	Kim Shin-young	Decision to Leave	헤어질 결심	Yeon-su
2022 (43rd)	Go Youn-jung	Hunt	헌트	Jo Yoo-jeong
2023 (44th)
2023 (44th)	Go Min-si	Smugglers	밀수	Go Ok-bun
2023 (44th)	Kim Si-eun	Next Sohee	다음 소희	So-hee
2023 (44th)	Kim Hyung-seo	Hopeless	화란	Ha-yan
2023 (44th)	Ahn Eun-jin	The Night Owl	올빼미	Jo So-yong
2023 (44th)	An So-yo	Green House	비닐하우스	Sunnam
2024 (45th)
2024 (45th)	Park Ju-hyun	Drive	드라이브	Han Yoo-na
2024 (45th)	Kwon Yu-ri	Dolphin	돌핀	Na-young
2024 (45th)	Lee Ju-myoung	Pilot	파일럿	Yoon Seul-gi
2024 (45th)	Lee Hye-ri	Victory	빅토리	Chu Pil-sun
2024 (45th)	Ha Yoon-kyung	Concerning My Daughter	딸에 대하여	Re In
2025 (46th)
2025 (46th)	Kim Do-yeon	Idiot Girls and School Ghost: School Anniversary	아메바 소녀들과 학교괴담: 개교기념일	Ji-yeon
2025 (46th)	Kim Min-ju	Hear Me: Our Summer	청설	Seo Ga-eul
2025 (46th)	Roh Yoon-seo	Hear Me: Our Summer	청설	Seo Yeo-reum
2025 (46th)	Lee Sun-bin	Noise	노이즈	Joo-young
2025 (46th)	Hong Ye-ji	A Normal Family	보통의 가족	Yang Hye-yoon

== General references ==
- "Winners and nominees lists". Blue Dragon Film Awards (in Korean). Archived from the original on 27 January 2022.
- "Blue Dragon Film Awards". Naver (in Korean).
