= List of CJ Entertainment films =

This is a list of films produced by South Korean film distribution and production company CJ Entertainment, under CJ ENM currently based in Seoul, South Korea. The company was established in 2000 and owned by CJ Group.

== Films ==
=== 2000s ===
Title (English)	Title (Korean)	Release date	Director	Production company	Notes
Chunhyang	춘향뎐	January 29, 2000	Im Kwon-taek		Film debut 73rd Academy Awards submission for Best International Feature Film
Interview	인터뷰	April 1, 2000	Daniel H. Byun	Cine 2000	Released under Cinema Service
Joint Security Area	공동경비구역	September 9, 2000	Park Chan-wook	Myung Films	Blue Dragon Film Award for Best Film; Grand Bell Awards for Best Film
The Warrior	무사 (Musa)	September 7, 2001	Kim Sung-su		
2009: Lost Memories	2009 로스트 메모리즈	February 1, 2002	Lee Si-myung		
Sympathy for Mr. Vengeance	복수는 나의	March 29, 2002	Park Chan-wook		1st of three films consisting Vengeance Trilogy by Park Chan-wook Co-distribute with Tartan Films
The Way Home	집으로...	April 5, 2002	Lee Jeong-hyang	Tube Pictures	Grand Bell Awards for Best Film
Oasis	오아시스	August 15, 2002	Lee Chang-dong		Co-distribute with Cineclick Asia 75th Academy Awards submission for Best International Feature Film: Baeksang Arts Awards for Best Film; Chunsa Film Art Awards for Best Film; Korean Film Awards for Best Film; Korean Association of Film Critics Awards for Best Film
Memories of Murder	살인의 추억	May 2, 2003	Bong Joon-ho	Sidus Pictures	Baeksang Arts Awards for Best Film; Chunsa Film Art Awards for Best Film; Grand Bell Awards for Best Film; Korean Film Awards for Best Film; Korean Association of Film Critics Awards for Best Film
Untold Scandal	스캔들 - 조선 남녀 상열지사	October 2, 2003	E J-yong	Bom Films	
Oldboy	올드보이	November 21, 2003	Park Chan-wook	Show East	2nd of three films consisting Vengeance Trilogy by Park Chan-wook: Korean Film Awards for Best Film; Korean Association of Film Critics Awards for Best Film
Once Upon a Time in High School: The Spirit of Jeet Kune Do	말죽거리 잔혹사	January 16, 2004	Yoo Ha	Sidus Pictures	
My Mother, the Mermaid	인어공주	June 30, 2004	Park Heung-sik		
Lady Vengeance	친절한 금자씨	July 29, 2005	Park Chan-wook		3rd and last of three films consisting Vengeance Trilogy by Park Chan-wook: Blue Dragon Film Award for Best Film
You Are My Sunshine	너는 내 운명	September 23, 2005	Park Jin-pyo		
The King and the Clown	왕의 남자	December 29, 2005	Lee Joon-ik	Cineworld Eagle Pictures	Grand Bell Awards for Best Film
I'm a Cyborg, But That's OK	싸이보그지만 괜찮아	December 7, 2006	Park Chan-wook		
Secret Sunshine	밀양	May 17, 2007	Lee Chang-dong		80th Academy Awards submission for Best International Feature Film: Korean Film Awards for Best Film
August Rush	None	November 21, 2007	Kirsten Sheridan	Southpaw Entertainment	South Korean-American co-production; distributed by Warner Bros. Pictures
My Sassy Girl	None	August 26, 2008	Yann Samuell	Vertigo Entertainment	South Korean-American co-production; remake of the South Korean film of the same name; distributed by 20th Century Fox Home Entertainment
Thirst	박쥐	April 30, 2009	Park Chan-wook	Moho Film	Co-distributor with Focus Features
Mother	마더	May 28, 2009	Bong Joon-ho	Barunson; CJ Entertainment	82nd Academy Awards submission for Best International Feature Film: Blue Dragon Film Award for Best Film; Buil Film Awards for Best Film; Busan Film Critics Award for Best Film; Korean Association of Film Critics Awards for Best Film
Tidal Wave	해운대 (Haeundae)	July 22, 2009	Yoon Je-kyoon	Doosaboo Film	

=== 2010s ===
Title (English)	Title (Korean)	Release date	Director	Production company	Notes
Attack the Gas Station 2	주유소 습격사건 2	January 21, 2010	Kim Sang-jin		
Silenced	도가니	September 22, 2011	Hwang Dong-hyuk	Samgeori Pictures Fantagio	
Punch	완득이	October 23, 2011	Lee Han		
As One	코리아	May 3, 2012	Moon Hyun-sung		
Swimming to Sea	파닥파닥	July 25, 2012	Dae-Hee Lee		Co-distribute with eigoMANGA (Steam only) First CGI and adult animated film to distribute.
Dino Time		November 30, 2012			
The Tower	타워	December 25, 2012	Kim Ji-hoon	The Tower Pictures	
Pororo, The Racing Adventure	뽀로로 극장판 슈퍼썰매 대모험	January 23, 2013	Young Kyun Park	Leading Investment Co. Ltd. China ACG Group Co. Ltd. China Entertainment Corporation Co. Ltd. Ocon Studios	Chinese-South Korean co-production
Snowpiercer	설국열차	August 1, 2013	Bong Joon-ho	Moho Film Opus Pictures Union Investment Partners Stillking Films	Korean Association of Film Critics Awards for Best Film
Flu	감기	August 14, 2013	Kim Sung-su	iLoveCinema iFilm Corp.	
11 A.M.	열한시	November 28, 2013	Kim Hyun-seok		
Miss Granny	수상한 그녀	January 22, 2014	Hwang Dong-hyuk		
Make Your Move	None	April 17, 2014	Duane Adler	Robert Cort Productions SM Entertainment	South Korean-American co-production; co-distributed with High Top Releasing
A Copy of My Mind	내 마음의 복제	September 3, 2015	Joko Anwar	Lo-Fi Flicks; Prodigihouse	Indonesian-South Korean co-production
The Accidental Detective	탐정: 더 비기닝	September 24, 2015	Kim Joung-hoon	Cree Pictures	
Veteran	탐정: 베테랑	August 5, 2015	Ryoo Seung-wan	Film K, Filmmaker R&K	
The Handmaiden	아가씨	June 1, 2016	Park Chan-wook	Moho Film Yong Film	BAFTA Award for Best Film Not in the English Language; Baeksang Arts Awards for Best Film
The Truth Beneath	비밀은 없다	June 23, 2016	Lee Kyoung-mi	Film Train	Busan Film Critics Awards for Best Film
Asura: The City of Madness	아수라	September 28, 2016	Kim Sung-su	Sanai Pictures	
Cado Cado: Doctor 101''	None	October 27, 2016	Ifa Isfansyah	Radikal Pictures	Indonesian-South Korean co-production
Blade of the Immortal	무한의 주인	April 29, 2017	Takashi Miike	Warner Bros. Japan; OLM, Inc. Recorded Picture Company; Filosophia; GyaO; Ken-On; Kodansha; Sega Sammy Entertainment; TV Asahi	British-Japanese-South Korean co-production
Sweet 20	None	June 25, 2017	Upi Avianto	Starvision	Indonesian-South Korean co-production
Satan's Slaves	None	September 28, 2017	Joko Anwar	Rapi Films	Indonesian-South Korean co-production
The Fortress	남한산성	October 3, 2017	Hwang Dong-hyuk		
Hot Sweet Sour	Acı Tatlı Ekşi	December 22, 2017	Gupse Özay	BKM Film	CJ's First Turkish film; Turkish film; co-production
1987: When the Day Comes	천구백팔십칠: 그날이 오면	December 27, 2017	Jang Joon-hwan		
Deliha 2	None	January 11, 2018	Gupse Özay	BKM Film, CGV Mars Distribution	Turkish film; co-production
The Accidental Detective 2: In Action	사고 탐정 2: 실행 중	June 13, 2018	Kim Joung-hoon	Cree Pictures	
Turn Right Barcelona	None	September 20, 2018	Guntur Soeharjanto	Starvision	Indonesian-South Korean co-production
Aruna & Her Palate	아루나와 그녀의 미각	September 27, 2018	Edwin	Palari Films; GoStudio; Phoenix Films; Ideosource Entertainment	Indonesian-language film; South Korean co-production only.
DreadOut	None	January 3, 2019	Kimo Stamboel	GoodHouse Production; Sky Media; Nimpuna Sinema; Lytogame	Indonesian-South Korean co-production
Kids On The Block	Can Dostlar	January 18, 2019	Tugçe Soysop	Besiktas Kültür Merkezi (BKM), and BKM Film	Turkish film; co-production
Extreme Job	극한직업	January 23, 2019	Lee Byeong-heon		
Kill Me If You Dare	Öldür Beni Sevgilim	March 7, 2019	Şenol Sönmez	Besiktas Kültür Merkezi (BKM), and BKM Film	Turkish film; co-production
Death Whisper	None	April 11, 2019	Awi Suryadi	Pichouse Films; Xing Xing; Studio Invictus; Mixx Entertainment	Indonesian-South Korean co-production; Indonesian adaptation of Whispering Corridors
Brother in Love	Aykut Enişte	May 24, 2019	Onur Bilgetay	Besiktas Kültür Merkezi (BKM), and BKM Film	Turkish film; co-production
Parasite	기생충	May 30, 2019	Bong Joon-ho	Barunson	Co-distribute with the U.S independent film company Neon 92nd Academy Awards submission for Best International Feature Film: Academy Award for Best Picture; Academy Award for Best International Feature Film; BAFTA Award for Best Film Not in the English Language; Baeksang Arts Awards for Best Film; Blue Dragon Film Award for Best Film; Buil Film Awards for Best Film; Cannes Film Festival – Palme d'Or; Golden Globe Award for Best Foreign Language Film; Grand Bell Awards for Best Film; Korean Association of Film Critics Awards for Best Film; Guinness World Records — First film to win both the Best International Feature Film and Best Picture Oscar, Most Oscar wins for an international feature film
Hit & Run	None	June 4, 2019	Ody C. Harahap	Screenplay Pictures; Legacy Pictures; Bukalapak Pictures; Nimpuna Sinema	Indonesian-South Korean co-production
Exit	엑시트	July 31, 2019	Lee Sang-geun		
Glorious Days	None	October 3, 2019	Riri Riza	BASE Entertainment; Miles Films; Ideosource Entertainment	Indonesian-South Korean co-production
Miracle in Cell No. 7	7. Koğuştaki Mucize	October 11, 2019	Mehmet Ada Öztekin	Lanistar Medya, Motion Content Group, and O3 Turkey Medya	Turkish film; co-production; Turkish adaptation of Miracle in Cell No. 7
Impetigore	None	October 17, 2019	Joko Anwar	BASE Entertainment; Rapi Films; Ivanhoe Pictures	Indonesian-South Korean co-production; Indonesian 92nd Academy Awards submission for Best International Feature Film
Ashfall	백두산	December 19, 2019	Lee Hae-jun and Kim Byung-seo	Dexter Studios	
Big Liar	Kırk Yalan	December 20, 2019	Hamdi Alkan	Erdi Yapım	Turkish film; co-production

=== 2020s ===
Title (English)	Title (Korean)	Release date	Director	Production company	Notes
The Closet	클로젯	February 5, 2020	Kim Kwang-bin	Moonlight Film JTBC Studios	
Endings, Beginnings	None	April 17, 2020	Drake Doremus	Protagonist Pictures	South Korean-American co-production; distributed by Samuel Goldwyn Films
Collectors	도굴	November 4, 2020	Park Jung-bae		
Midnight	미드나이트	June 30, 2021	Kwon Oh-seung	Peppermint & Company	Co-distribute with TVING
A Year-End Medley	해피 뉴 이어	December 29, 2021	Kwak Jae-yong	Hive Media Corp	Co-distribute with TVING
Father Stu	None	April 13, 2022	Rosalind Ross	Columbia Pictures Municipal Pictures	South Korean co-production only; distributed by Sony Pictures Releasing
Broker	헤어질 決心	June 8, 2022	Hirokazu Kore-eda	Zip Cinema	
Press Play	None	June 24, 2022	Greg Björkman		distributed by The Avenue
Decision to Leave	헤어질 결심	June 29, 2022	Park Chan-wook	Moho Film	
Jailangkung: Sandekala	None	September 22, 2022	Kimo Stamboel	Rapi Films; Sky Media; Legacy Pictures; Nimpuna Media	Indonesian-South Korean co-production
Call Me Dad	None	August 7, 2025	Benni Setiawan	Visinema Studios; Legacy Pictures; CBI Pictures; Anami Films; Indopictures Studios	Indonesian-South Korean co-production; Indonesian adaptation of Pawn
No Other Choice	어쩔수가없다	September 24, 2025	Park Chan-wook	Moho Film; KG Productions	
Tazza: The Song of Beelzebub	타짜: 벨제붑의 노래	September 23, 2026	Choi Kook-hee	Sidus Pictures	
Paradise Lost	실낙원	October 21, 2026	Yeon Sang-ho	Wow Point	
Ally	앨리	2027	Bong Joon Ho	4th Creative Party; Barunson C&C; Penture Invest	

== See also ==
- List of South Korean submissions for the Academy Award for Best International Feature Film
