= Korean horror =

Film subgenre

Korean horror films have existed since the early years of Korean cinema, but the genre experienced a resurgence in the late 1990s. Many Korean horror films focus on the suffering and anguish of characters rather than on explicit gore and violence. Korean horror also employs motifs, themes, and imagery similar to those found in Japanese horror.

Modern South Korean horror is often characterized by stylistic direction, social commentary, and genre blending. The horror and thriller genres have played a significant role in attracting international attention to South Korean cinema.

Several Korean horror films have been remade in Hollywood, including Oldboy (2013), Into the Mirror (2003), and A Tale of Two Sisters (2003). More recent titles such as Train to Busan (2016) have been the subject of English-language adaptation discussions: an American project titled The Last Train to New York was announced, though as of mid-2025 it is described as a spin-off set in the same shared universe rather than a direct remake. Additionally, acclaimed filmmaker Park Chan-wook is developing an English-language TV adaptation of Oldboy with Lionsgate Television.

== The female ghost ==
According to the Korean expression Han, "When a woman is full of resentment, she will bring frost in May and June" and this may explain the popularity of the female ghost that is often featured in Korean horror films. Her deep feeling of resentment is supposed to be cold enough to freeze the hot air that occurs during those months. The woman's vengeance is a thing to be feared, thus becoming the object of horror. In the past women have been oppressed and ignored for so long that the horrific rage and vengeance we see in the films have been brought upon by the many years of repression. Another belief is that when a woman dies before she gets to enjoy the pleasures of marriage and having children, she will not be able to move on to the "other side". Instead, she becomes trapped between the two worlds and causes horrific phenomena. The hierarchical domestic status a man's mother has and the often strained relationship with her daughter-in-law in Korea is also used as a means of creating female villains in media. Films such as A Devilish Homicide (1965) and The Hole (1997) cast a murderous or cruel mother-in-law against the protagonist.

== Revenge ==
South Korean cinema is known for violent thrillers with themes of revenge like Bedevilled, I Saw the Devil (2010) and The Vengeance Trilogy. Recent revenge films also tend to follow the characters seeking revenge rather than the protagonist being a victim of a vengeful ghost or person. The desire to create and see films about revenge is often explained as a result of social anger built up in a populace by South Korea's turbulent history. Park Chan-wook, director of The Vengeance Trilogy, has said that his revenge-motivated movies serve as a reaction to Korean culture's traditional value of peacemaking and forgiveness.

== 2010 Korean Horror Film Festival ==
The 2010 Korean Horror Film Festival was held in Mandaluyong in the Philippines at the Shangri-La Plaza Mall from October 27–31 and through November 2–4. It worked together with the Embassy of the Republic of Korea, The Korean-Philippine Foundation, Inc. and Shangri-La Plaza. With free admission attendees were treated to some of the best and highly successful Korean horror films. Films such as Arang, The Red Shoes, M, Hansel and Gretel, Ghost, Paradise Murdered, and Epitaph were among the films showcased.

== Influential Korean horror films ==
The Housemaid (1960) has been described in Koreanfilm.org as a "consensus pick as one of the top three Korean films of all time".

Whispering Corridors (1998) is seen as the film to have sparked the explosion of the Korean horror genre. It centers on the theme of school girls and the mysterious "other side", but also offered criticism of the Korean school system. Four more distinct horror films set in all-girls schools were made as part of Whispering Corridors (film series).

A Tale of Two Sisters (2003) is the highest-grossing Korean horror film so far and the first to be screened in America. It was remade in America in 2009 as The Uninvited. Based on a folk tale titled Janghwa Hongryeon jeon, it tells the story of two sisters dealing with a controlling stepmother and a passive father.

Save the Green Planet! (2003) demonstrates Korean cinema's ability to blend genre in non-traditional ways. The film follows an unstable man who kidnaps and tortures an executive he believes to be an alien. It combines slapstick comedy, psychological thriller, and sci-fi horror.

Someone Behind You (2007) is an extremely violent supernatural thriller based on the 2005 comic novel "Two Will Come" by Kang-Kyung-Ok. It focuses on an increasingly escalating unprecedented family murders or the issue of family annihilation. A young woman witnesses the shocking killings around her area and she too is followed by an unexplainable-yet brutal and bloody curse. She fears that her family and friends are out to put her to death in their murderous hands. A strange menacing student warns her not to trust her family, friends, even not herself. In 2009 the film was released in America under the title "Voices" it premiered at the defunct film festival After Dark Horrorfest.

Train to Busan (2016) is an action horror take on the Zombie apocalypse. A man and his young daughter journey to see the girl's mother when a zombie outbreak occurs, forcing the passengers to attempt to survive till they can reach a safe zone in Busan. The film is one of the most internationally successful films from South Korea and broke domestic box office records.

Films such as Gonjiam: Haunted Asylum (2018) have brought Korean horror films even more international attention.

== List of notable films ==
- 0.0 MHz
- 301, 302
- 4 Horror Tales (Series)
  - February 29
  - Forbidden Floor
  - Roommates
  - Dark Forest
- The 8th Night
- Acacia
- Alive
- Antarctic Journal
- APT
- Arang
- Bloody Beach
- Bloody Reunion
- Black House
- Bunshinsaba
- The Cat
- Cello
- Cinderella
- The Closet
- The Cursed: Dead Man's Prey
- Death Bell (Series)
  - Death Bell 1: The Movie
  - Death Bell 2: Bloody Camp
- Dead Friend
- The Divine Fury
- Doll Master
- Don't Click
- Epitaph
- Evil Twin
- Exhuma
- Face
- A Ghost Story of Joseon Dynasty
- Ghost House
- Ghost Train
- Gonjiam: Haunted Asylum
- Guimoon: The Lightless Door
- Hansel and Gretel
- The Haunted House (Series)
  - The Haunted House: The Secret of the Cave
  - The Haunted House: The Sky Goblin VS Jormungandr
  - The Haunted House: The Dimensional Goblin and the Seven Worlds
- Horror Stories (Series)
  - Horror Stories
  - Horror Stories 2
  - Horror Stories 3
- The Host
- I Saw the Devil
- Into the Mirror
- The Isle
- Killer Toon
- Lingering
- Loner
- Manhole
- Metamorphosis
- The Medium
- Midnight Ballad for Ghost Theater
- The Mimic
- Mourning Grave
- Muoi: The Legend of a Portrait
- Oh! My Ghost
- Paradise Murdered
- Phone
- The Puppet
- The Quiet Family
- R-Point
- The Record
- Red Eye
- The Red Shoes
- The Ring Virus
- Say Yes
- Show Me the Ghost
- Sleep
- Someone Behind You
- Sorum
- Spider Forest
- Suddenly at Midnight
- Svaha: The Sixth Finger
- A Tale of Two Sisters
- Tell Me Something
- Thirst
- Three (Series)
  - Three... The Movie
  - Three... Extremes
- To Sir, with Love
- Train to Busan (Series)
  - Seoul Station
  - Train to Busan
  - Peninsula
- Unborn But Forgotten
- The Uninvited
- Urban Myths
- The Wailing
- Warning: Do Not Play
- Whispering Corridors (Series)
  - Whispering Corridors 1: The Movie
  - Whispering Corridors 2: Memento Mori
  - Whispering Corridors 3: Wishing Stairs
  - Whispering Corridors 4: Voice
  - Whispering Corridors 5: A Blood Pledge
  - Whispering Corridors 6: The Humming
- White: Melody of Death
- The Wig
- The Witch (Series)
  - The Witch: Part 1. The Subversion
  - The Witch: Part 2. The Other One
- The Wrath
- Yoga

== Korean horror directors ==
- Ahn Byeong-ki – director of the horror films Nightmare, Phone, Bunshinsaba, and APT
- Bong Joon-ho – director of the horror film The Host and writer of Antarctic Journal
- Kim Dong-bin – director of the horror films The Ring Virus and Red Eye
- Kim Jee-woon – director of the horror films A Tale of Two Sisters, Three (the segment "Memories"), and The Quiet Family
- Kong Su-chang – director of the horror films Tell Me Something, R-Point, and Death Bell
- Park Ki-hyung – director of the horror films Whispering Corridors and Acacia
- Park Hoon-jung – director of The Witch (Series)
- Yu Seon-dong – director of the film Death Bell 2: Bloody Camp

== See also ==
- Korean science fiction
