= Janghwa Hongryeon jeon (1936 film) =

1936 Korean film by Hong Gae-myeong

Story of Jang-hwa and Hong-ryeon
- Sceneshot
- Hangul: 장화홍련전
- Hanja: 薔花紅蓮傳
- RR: Janghwa Hongryeon jeon
- MR: Changhwa Hongnyŏn chŏn
- Directed by: Gae-myeong Hong
- Written by: Gae-myeong Hong
- Starring: Su-il Mun; Ye-bong Mun; Gyeong-sun Ji; Jong-cheol Lee
- Release date: 1936
- Country: Korea
- Languages: Silent film Korean intertitles
- Budget: 1,500 won

Story of Janghwa and Hongryeon is a 1936 Korean silent film directed by Gae-myeong Hong. The film is based on a popular Korean fairy tale "Janghwa Hongryeon jeon".

== Cast ==
- Su-il Mun
- Ye-bong Mun
- Gyeong-sun Ji
- Jong-cheol Lee

== Background ==
This adaptation of a literary classic is typical of the Colonial Korea film production.

== Other adaptations of the story ==
Janghwa Hongryeon jeon (often referred to as 'A Tale of Two Sisters' or 'Two Sisters') had been adapted for the screen in 1924, and was again later adapted in 1956, 1962, 1972, 2003, and 2009.
