= A Tale of Two Sisters =

2003 South Korean film

- Theatrical release poster
- Hangul: 장화, 홍련
- Hanja: 薔花, 紅蓮
- Lit.: Rose Flower, Red Lotus
- Directed by: Kim Jee-woon
- Written by: Kim Jee-woon
- Produced by: Oh Jeong-wan; Oh Ki-min
- Starring: Im Soo-jung; Moon Geun-young; Yum Jung-ah; Kim Kap-soo
- Cinematography: Lee Mo-gae
- Edited by: Ko Im-pyo
- Music by: Lee Byung-woo
- Production company: B.O.M. Film Productions Co.
- Distributed by: Cineclick Asia; Big Blue Film
- Release date: 13 June 2003
- Running time: 114 minutes
- Country: South Korea
- Language: Korean
- Budget: $3.7 million
- Box office: $1 million

A Tale of Two Sisters (Korean: 장화, 홍련; lit. 'Rose Flower, Red Lotus') is a 2003 South Korean psychological horror film written and directed by Kim Jee-woon. The film is inspired by a Joseon-era folktale entitled "Janghwa Hongryeon jeon", which has been adapted to film several times. The plot focuses on a recently released patient from a mental institution who returns home with her sister, only to face disturbing events while living with their new unhinged stepmother.

The film opened to very strong commercial and critical reception and won Best Picture at the 2004 Fantasporto Film Festival. It is the highest-grossing South Korean horror film and the first South Korean picture to be screened in American theatres. An English-language remake titled The Uninvited was released in 2009 to mixed reviews.

== Plot ==
A teenage girl, Su-mi, is being treated for shock and psychosis in a mental institution. She is eventually released and returns home to her family's secluded country estate with her father Moo-hyeon and younger sister Su-yeon. The sisters' stepmother, Eun-joo, constantly requires medication.

Su-mi and Eun-joo verbally clash multiple times. Moo-hyeon is uninterested in Su-mi's complaints and rejects her request to remove a wardrobe in Su-yeon's room, as it seems to upset Su-yeon. One night, Su-yeon has a nightmare of her late mother's ghost and flees into Su-mi's room for comfort. Afterwards, Su-mi also has a nightmare with a ghost while Su-yeon sleeps next to her. The next day, Su-mi finds family photos which reveal that Eun-joo was formerly an in-home nurse for her then-terminally ill mother. She discovers bruises on Su-yeon's arms and suspects Eun-joo to be responsible. Su-yeon neither confirms nor denies this. Instead, she begins sobbing and runs away when Su-mi gets angry about her silence. Su-mi confronts Eun-joo about the bruises, but Eun-joo refuses to apologize, explaining that they were "retribution."

That night, the sisters' uncle, Sun-kyu, and aunt, Mi-hee, arrive for dinner, and Eun-joo tells bewildering stories involving Sun-kyu, which he denies remembering. Mi-hee suffers a violent seizure and almost suffocates. After recovering on their way home, Mi-hee tells Sun-kyu that she saw "a girl" beneath the kitchen sink during her seizure. Eun-joo searches the kitchen when the cupboard below the sink opens by itself. She sees a hair clip on the ground, but the ghost girl violently grabs her arm when she tries to pick it up.

Eun-joo later finds her pet birds killed and her personal photos defaced. She believes that either one or both of her stepdaughters are responsible and locks Su-yeon in the wardrobe. Su-mi releases her and tells Moo-hyeon, who had just found and buried another dead bird, about Eun-joo's abuse. Moo-hyeon begs her to stop acting out and exasperatedly reveals that Su-yeon is dead. Su-mi refuses to believe it as she is sure that her sister is right next to her, sobbing uncontrollably. The next morning, Eun-joo drags a bloodied sack through the house, whipping it in anger. Su-mi believes that Su-yeon is inside the sack. Eun-joo and Su-mi get into a physical altercation. Moo-hyeon arrives to find an unconscious Su-mi.

It is ultimately revealed that Su-mi and her father were alone in the house all along. Su-mi is suffering from dissociative identity disorder and has two personalities: herself, and a ruder, more distant variation of her stepmother Eun-joo. The "body" in the sack that Su-mi was whipping was actually porcelain dolls, and she was also the one who killed the birds. Su-yeon is also revealed to be long dead, her presence having been a hallucination by Su-Mi. Moo-hyeon and the real Eun-joo, a much different woman than what Su-mi had envisioned, send Su-mi back to the mental institution. Eun-joo tries to reconcile with Su-mi, promising to visit her as often as she can, but Su-mi rebuffs her and forcefully grabs her arm, mirroring the injury Su-mi had discovered on Su-yeon days earlier. After they leave, Su-mi hears Su-yeon's ghost whistle their mother's favorite tune. That night, Eun-joo hears the same tune and footsteps in Su-yeon's old bedroom. Luring her to her former bedroom, Su-yeon's ghost crawls out of the wardrobe towards Eun-joo. Meanwhile, Su-mi lies back in her bed and smiles while a tear rolls down her cheek.

A flashback reveals the day that led Su-mi to be institutionalized. While his terminally ill wife is still alive, Moo-hyeon engages in an adulterous affair with Eun-joo, when she was still their in-home nurse. This upsets the sisters and, after comforting Su-yeon following a confrontation during a family dinner, drives their mother to kill herself in Su-yeon's bedroom wardrobe. Finding her mother dead, Su-yeon grabs her corpse in shock and begins to shake the wardrobe in a panic, trying to free her. The wardrobe collapses on top of them, which everyone in the house and outside hears. Eun-joo investigates and sees Su-yeon thrashing and suffocating. She runs out in a panic but hesitates and turns back around in the hallway. However, in that same moment Su-mi runs into her. Eun-joo asks her about the noise, but Su-mi ignores the question and mouths off at Eun-joo for intruding on their family's lives. Lashing out at each other, they have an argument while Su-yeon is shown to still be alive but in pain and slowly dying in her room. Angry, Eun-joo grabs Su-mi's arm and tells her that she "will regret this moment" and, unknown to Su-mi, leaves Su-yeon to die just to spite her. Su-mi storms out of the house, leaving Eun-joo visibly shaking in the hallway, while Su-yeon cries and struggles under the wardrobe. Su-mi walks away from the house in a quick, but decelerating stride, watched by Eun-joo from an upstairs window. Su-yeon dies, begging her sister to help her with her last breath.

== Cast ==
- Im Soo-jung as Bae Su-mi
- Moon Geun-young as Bae Su-yeon
- Yum Jung-ah as Heo Eun-joo
- Kim Kap-soo as Bae Moo-hyeon
- Lee Seung-bi as Mi-hee (Eun-joo's sister in law)
- Lee Dae-yeon as Su-mi's doctor
- Park Mi-hyun as Mrs Bae (Moo-hyeon's first wife and Su-mi's and Su-yeon's mother)
- Woo Ki-hong as Sun-kyu (Eun-joo's brother)

== Production ==
The film is loosely based on a popular Korean fairy tale, "Janghwa Hongryeon jeon", which has been adapted into film versions in 1924, 1936, 1956, 1962, 1972, and 2009.

In the original Korean folktale, the sisters' names are Janghwa and Hongryeon (Rose Flower and Red Lotus). In the film, they are Su-mi and Su-yeon (though the names still hold the meaning, Rose and Lotus).

Im Soo-jung (Su-mi) originally auditioned for the role of Su-yeon (played by Moon Geun-young).

Kim Jee-woon originally wanted Jun Ji-hyun to play Su-mi, but she refused the role because she thought the script was too scary. Her next film was an unrelated horror film, The Uninvited.

== Release ==
=== Home media ===
The film was released on DVD on March 29, 2005, by Palisades Tartan. The film was originally announced for a Blu-ray release for October 22, 2013, by Tartan but the disc was never released as the company ceased operations. The DVD is now out of print. The film eventually received a region-free Blu-ray in Korea on October 14, 2013. Though the disc also offers English subtitles, the extras are all in Korean.

In 2023, Umbrella Entertainment is scheduled to release the film on Blu-Ray in June 2023.

== Reception ==
Director Kim Jee-woon

=== Box office ===
It is the highest-grossing Korean horror film and the first to be screened in American theaters upon release. With a limited American release starting 3 December 2004, it grossed $72,541.

=== Critical response ===
A Tale of Two Sisters garnered positive reviews. Review aggregator Rotten Tomatoes reports an approval rating of 86% based on 63 reviews, with an average rating of 7.1/10. The site's critics' consensus reads: "Restrained but disturbing, A Tale of Two Sisters is a creepily effective, if at times confusing, horror movie." Meanwhile, Metacritic scored the film 65 out of 100, meaning "generally favorable reviews" from 19 critics.

Kevin Thomas of the Los Angeles Times described A Tale of Two Sisters as "a triumph of stylish, darkly absurdist horror that even manages to strike a chord of Shakespearean tragedy – and evokes a sense of wonder anew at all the terrible things people do to themselves and each other."

== Awards and nominations ==
2003 Sitges Film Festival

- Nomination – Best Film

2003 Screamfest Horror Film Festival

- Best Picture
- Best Actress – Im Soo-jung

2003 Busan Film Critics Awards

- Best New Actress – Im Soo-jung
- Best Cinematography – Lee Mo-gae
- Special Jury Prize – Kim Jee-woon

2003 Blue Dragon Film Awards

- Best New Actress – Im Soo-jung
- Nomination – Best New Actress – Moon Geun-young

2003 Korean Film Awards

- Best New Actress – Im Soo-jung
- Best Art Direction – Park Hee-jeong
- Best Sound – Choi Tae-young

2003 Director's Cut Awards

- Best Actress – Yum Jung-ah
- Best New Actress – Im Soo-jung

2004 Brussels International Fantastic Film Festival

- Silver Raven – Yum Jung-ah

2004 Fantasia Festival

- Most Popular Film

2004 Fantasporto Film Festival

- International Fantasy Film Best Actress – Im Soo-jung
- International Fantasy Film Best Director – Kim Jee-woon
- International Fantasy Film Best Film
- Orient Express Section Special Jury Award

2004 Gérardmer Film Festival

- Grand Prize
- Prix 13ème Rue
- Youth Jury Grand Prize

2004 Grand Bell Awards

- Nomination – Best Actress – Yum Jung-ah
- Nomination – Best New Actress – Im Soo-jung
- Nomination – Best Cinematography – Lee Mo-gae
- Nomination – Best Art Direction – Cho Geun-hyun
- Nomination – Best Lighting – Oh Seung-chul
- Nomination – Best Costume Design – Ok Su-gyeong
- Nomination – Best Music – Lee Byung-woo
- Nomination – Best Sound – Kim Kyung-taek, Choi Tae-young

== Remake ==
DreamWorks announced the two lead actresses on 28 June, with Emily Browning as Anna Ivers (Su-mi) and Arielle Kebbel as Alex Ivers (Su-yeon). Although originally titled A Tale of Two Sisters like the original film, it was later renamed as The Uninvited.

== See also ==
- K-horror
