= Aunt Tiger =

Taiwanese folklore

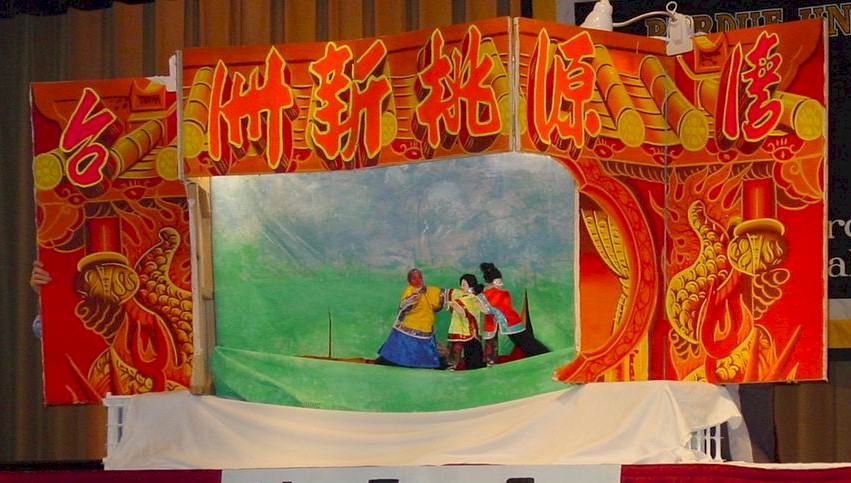
- Aunt Tiger performed by glove puppetry

Folk tale
- Name: Aunt Tiger
- Also known as: Auntie Tigress
- Mythology: Asian
- Country: Taiwan
- Origin Date: 16th century

Aunt Tiger
- Traditional Chinese: 虎姑婆
- Simplified Chinese: 虎姑婆
Transcriptions
Standard Mandarin
- Hanyu Pinyin: Hǔ Gūpó
Southern Min
- Hokkien POJ: Hó͘-ko͘-pô

Aunt Tiger or Auntie Tigress (Chinese: 虎姑婆; Tongyong Pinyin: Hǔ Gūpó; Tâi-lô: Hóo-koo-pô) is a Taiwanese folktale with many variations. The story revolves around a tiger spirit on the mountain who turns into an old woman, abducts children at night and devours them to satisfy her appetite. It is often used to coax children to fall asleep quickly. The most well-known version was compiled by Taiwanese writer Wang Shilang, where the setting of the story is in a Hakka settlement in Taiwan.

== Legend ==
A tiger spirit must eat a few children to become a human, so it descends from the mountains to find children to eat. After going down the mountain, it hides outside a house and eavesdropped, knowing that the mother is going out and there is only a pair of siblings in the house, so it turns into an aunt to trick the child into opening the door and entering the house. Sleeping until midnight, Aunt Tiger ate the younger brother and made a chewing sound. The sister asks Aunt Tiger what she was eating when she hears it. Aunt Tiger says she is just eating peanuts, and then throws a piece of the brother's finger to the sister. The sister calmly pretends to go to the toilet then hides in the tree outside the door. When Aunt Tiger finds out and is going to eat the sister, the latter cleverly asks Aunt Tiger to boil a pot of hot water (otherwise it is hot oil) for her, and asks Aunt Tiger to hang the hot water on the tree because she wants to jump into the pot by herself. When Aunt Tiger hangs the hot water to the tree with a rope, the sister asks Aunt Tiger to close her eyes and open her mouth. Then, she pours the boiling water down Aunt Tiger's throat, killing the tiger. One variation is that there are two girls who are sisters instead of the brother and sister combo.

== Variations ==
There are also stories with similar plots circulating in South Korea, Japan, Vietnam and other countries, similar to the story of Little Red Riding Hood in Europe. Similar storylines can also be found in China in which the aunt is a wolf or bear. According to Taiwanese scholars, the tale of "Tiger Grandma" is "widely diffused" in Taiwan, with at least thirty-two variants registered.

In addition, such a story with two children and an adult who intends to murder them is also in Hansel and Gretel in Grimm's Fairy Tales. In South Korea, there is a folktale called Janghwa Hongryeon jeon with a similar plot. The purpose of this type of story may be to warn children not to believe strangers who take the opportunity of the absence of adults to enter houses and kidnap children.

== Analysis ==
=== Tale type ===
Chinese folklorist and scholar Ting Nai-tung established a second typological classification of Chinese folktales (the first was by Wolfram Eberhard), and abstracted a tale type he indexed as number 333C, "The Tiger Grandma". In this tale type, a child-eating creature (ogress, tiger or wolf) pretends to be an older female relative of the children, and pays them a visit after their mother leaves. The ogress is allowed to enter the children's house, devours one of them, but the survivor escapes to another place. In that regard, researcher Juwen Zhang indicated that type 333C, "Wolf grandma", is an example of local Chinese tale types that are not listed in the international ATU index.

The story is also classified as type 333C in the Taiwanese Folktale Index.

The tale has also been compared to the European tale Little Red Riding Hood, classified in the international index as type ATU 333, and to The Wolf and the Kids (tale type ATU 123).

== Adaptations ==
=== Animated films ===
Public Television Service and S4C co-produced a clay animation on this story. In 2000, it won the Children's Jury 1st Prize in the category of Television Animation at the 17th Chicago International Children's Film Festival.

=== Nursery rhymes ===
Aunt Tiger's nursery rhyme of the name "Auntie Tigress" was included in the pop music album released by Taiwanese singer Wawa in 1986.

=== Films ===
- In 2005, the movie Hu Gu Po directed by Alice Wang (王毓雅) used the folklore as its plot.
- In 2007, the movie titled Auntie Tigress, directed by Wei Ling Chang, also based its plot on this folklore.

=== Books ===
- In 2006, Aunt Tiger's picture book drawn by Taiwanese illustrator Eva Wang (王家珠) was published.
- In 2009, American writer Laurence Yep published the book titled Auntie Tiger, in which he recounted the famous Taiwanese folklore.

== See also ==
- Little Red Riding Hood
- Janghwa Hongryeon jeon
- Hansel and Gretel
