= Acacia (film) =

- Directed by: Park Ki-hyeong
- Written by: Seong Gi-young; Park Ki-hyung
- Produced by: Kang Sung-kyu; Park Ki-hyung; Yu Yeong-shik
- Starring: Shim Hye-jin; Kim Jin-geun; Moon Woo-bin; Jeong Na-yun
- Cinematography: Oh Hyun-jae
- Edited by: Ham Seong-weon
- Music by: Choi Man-sik
- Distributed by: Show East
- Release date: October 17, 2003
- Running time: 103 minutes
- Country: South Korea
- Language: Korean

Acacia is a 2003 South Korean horror film directed by Park Ki-hyung and starring Shim Hye-jin and Kim Jin-geun. The film was re-released in 2011 with the title "Root of Evil."

== Plot ==
Unable to have children of their own, married couple Mi-sook and Do-il decide to adopt a young boy named Lee Jin-seong. Once he moves in with Mi-sook and Do-il, his name is changed to Kim Jin-seong. The boy becomes fascinated with an acacia tree in the backyard of his new home, believing it to be his mother. This tree soon becomes the focal point of increasingly strange occurrences, particularly when Jin-seong appears to run away.

Jin-seong befriends an older girl named Min-ji, who tells him she cannot attend school because she has lost a lot of blood. After she kisses him, Jin-seong becomes more aggressive and violent. His behavior worsens when Mi-sook becomes pregnant and gives birth to a new baby named Hae-sung. Struggling with his emotions, Jin-seong becomes withdrawn and confused, developing anger towards his adoptive family. This anger drives him to try to smother the new baby. Frustrated by Jin-seong's actions and his obsession with the acacia tree, Mi-sook decides to chop the tree down, which leads to Jin-seong allegedly running away.

After Jin-seong disappears, the dying acacia tree begins to bloom with vibrant life. Min-ji transforms as well, becoming increasingly obsessed with the tree. She claims to hear Jin-seong's voice coming from within it and witnesses paranormal occurrences involving the tree, flowers, and ants attacking Jin-seong's family.

It is eventually revealed that Jin-seong's mother accidentally gravely injured him while attempting to chop down the tree. Her husband witnessed this and helped her bury their adopted son's body, believing he was dead. However, when Jin-seong's arm moved, indicating he was still alive, Do-il struck him with a shovel to ensure he was dead and completed the burial. Overcome with guilt and stress, Jin-seong's mother creates an illusion for herself that her son had simply run away, gradually losing her grip on reality as she sinks deeper into her guilt.

== Cast ==
- Shim Hye-jin as Choi Mi-sook
- Kim Jin-geun as Kim Do-il
- Moon Woo-bin as Kim Jin-seong
- Park Woong
- Jung Na-yoon as Min-ji
- Min Hye-ryeong
