= Yeojin Jeon =

South Korean actress (born 1984)

- 전여진
- Born: January 8, 1984 (age 42); South Korea
- Other name: Jeon Ji-ae (전지애)
- Occupation: Actress

Yeojin Jeon (Korean: 전여진; born January 8, 1984), formerly known as Ji-ae Jeon, is a South Korean actress most well known for her role as Lee Kang-hyun in the popular 2006 Korean TV drama Princess Hours.

On May 28, 2025, Actress Jeon Yeo-jin announced the signing of an exclusive contract with her new agency, Fantagio.

== Filmography ==
=== Film ===
Year	Title	Role
2005	Voice	Hwa-jung
2008	Girl Scout	Waitress

=== TV shows ===
Year	Title	Role
2006	Princess Hours (TV)	Lee Kang-hyun
2017	Stranger	Kang Jin-sub's wife
