= Janghwa Hongryeon jeon (1972 film) =

- Hangul: 장화홍련전
- Hanja: 薔花紅蓮傳
- RR: Janghwa Hongryeonjeon
- MR: Changhwa Hongnyŏnjŏn
- Directed by: Lee Yu-seob
- Written by: Lee Hie-woo
- Produced by: Shin Sang-ok
- Starring: Lee Yeong-ok; Heo Jang-kang; Yun In-ja
- Cinematography: Choi Seung-woo
- Edited by: Hyeon Dong-chun
- Music by: Hwang Mun-pyeong
- Release date: June 29, 1972
- Running time: 90 minutes
- Country: South Korea
- Language: Korean

Janghwa Hongryeonjeon jeon (literally The Story of Janghwa and Hongryeon) is 1972 South Korean horror film directed by Lee Yu-seob. The film is based on a popular Korean fairy tale "Janghwa Hongryeon jeon".

== Synopsis ==
Janghwa Hongreonjeon is film based on a popular Korean fairy tale "Janghwa Hongryeon jeon" which had been previously filmed in 1924, 1936, 1956 and 1962. Director Kim Jee-woon used the story as the basis of his 2003 film, A Tale of Two Sisters. The evil stepmother of sisters Jang-hwa and Hong-ryeon orders her son to murder the two girls so that she can claim the inheritance from the girls' father. But the sisters come back as ghosts seeking revenge.

== Cast ==
- Lee Yeong-ok
- Heo Jang-kang
- Yun In-ja
- Lim Ji-woon
- Kim Seong-mok
- Lee Dae-ro
- Shin Dong-hyeon
- Kim Hyeok-su
- Song Hye-kyeong
- Jeong Han-heon

== Bibliography ==
- "Jang-Hwa and Hong-Ryeon : A story of two sisters(J...(1972)". Korean Movie Database.
