= Whispering Corridors (film series) =

- Directed by: Park Ki-hyung (1); Kim Tae-yong (2); Min Kyu-dong (2); Yun Jae-yeon (3); Choi Ik-hwan (4); Lee Jong-yong (5)
- Written by: In Jung-ok (1); Park Ki-hyung (1); Kim Tae-yong (2); Min Kyu-dong (2); Kim Su-ah (3); Lee Yong-yeon (3); Eun Si-yeon (3); Lee Soyoung (3); Choi Ik-hwan (4); Lee Jong-yong(5)
- Produced by: Lee Choon-yeon (1-5)
- Starring: Choi Se-yeon; Kim Gyu-ri; Lee Mi-yeon; Park Yong-soo; Kim Yu-seok; Lee Young-jin; Park Ye-jin; Kim Min-sun; Gong Hyo-jin; Kim Ok-vin; Seo Ji-hye; Cha Ye-ryeon; Son Eun-seo; Jang Kyeong-ah; Song Min-jeong; Oh Yeon-seo
- Music by: Moon Hyun-Sung; Jo Seong-woo; Gong Myeong-a; Lee Byeong-hun
- Production company: Cine 2000
- Distributed by: Cinema Service; Lotte Entertainment
- Release dates: May 30, 1998 (Whispering Corridors); December 24, 1999 (Memento Mori); August 1, 2003 (Wishing Stairs); July 15, 2005 (Voice); June 18, 2009 (A Blood Pledge); June 17, 2021 (The Humming)
- Running time: Total (5 films); 492
- Country: South Korea
- Language: Korean

Whispering Corridors (Korean: 여고괴담; Hanja: 女高怪談; RR: Yeogogoedam; lit. 'Ghost Stories in a Girls' High') is a South Korean supernatural horror film series. The series uses an all-girls high school as the backdrop for each of its films. Every Whispering Corridors film features a different plot, characters and settings. The series is notable for helping generate the explosion of the New Korean Wave cinematic movement, and dealing with taboo topics such as authoritarianism in the harsh South Korean education system, gay relationships and teen suicide, following the liberalization of censorship.

== History ==
In the late '90s, screenwriter Oh Ki-min had written the screenplay for Whispering Corridors and showed it to various production companies, but the film was rejected by all of them. Meanwhile, producer Lee Choon-yun became aware of a Japanese horror film set in a school (Gakkō no Kaidan) and thought this type of horror film might work well in Korea. Since many Korean schools have urban legends tied to them, Choon-yun intended to produce a contemporary film version of the scary stories adapted from school legends. Choon-yun stated that another thing that motivated him was his antagonism toward the harsh South Korean education system. The producer thought that an all-girls high school was an attractive setting, stating that "It's a space that stimulates male curiosity, a place that men have never been in but are fascinated by. Conversely, for women, it's an environment that they can feel nostalgic about."

The film became a big commercial success, which led to several sequels. The films don't share any direct links with each other, due to the producer wanting Whispering Corridors to be a "brand name".

== Films ==
Film	Year	Directors	Writers	Producer
Whispering Corridors	1998	Park Ki-hyung	In Jung-ok & Park Ki-hyung	Lee Choon-yeon
Memento Mori	1999	Kim Tae-yong & Min Kyu-dong	Kim Tae-yong & Min Kyu-dong	Lee Choon-yeon
Wishing Stairs	2003	Yun Jae-yeon	Kim Su-ah, Lee Yong-yeon, Eun Si-yeon & Lee So-young	Lee Choon-yeon
Voice	2005	Choi Ik-hwan	Choi Ik-hwan	Lee Choon-yeon
A Blood Pledge	2009	Lee Jong-yong	Lee Jong-yong	Lee Choon-yeon
The Humming	2021	Lee Myung	Lee Myung	Park Eunha

=== Whispering Corridors (1998) ===
In an exclusive all-girls school, a former pupil returns to start a new job as a teacher and strikes up a friendship with two very different students. But when a teacher is found dead, apparently having committed suicide, circumstances that link the past and the present begin to unveil themselves. As the body count rises, the memories of past deaths begin to call forth a series of ghosts to haunt the corridors of this troubled school.

=== Memento Mori (1999) ===
Min-Ah spots a maroon diary near a water fountain at school. She's late for class and takes the diary with her. In class, Min-Ah opens the diary and experiences a brief hallucinatory experience. The diary originally belonged to two girls that attend the same school, Hyo-Shin and Si-Eun. The two girls seem to share a relationship that's closer than even best friends. As Min-Ah becomes immersed in their world, a suicide occurs at school. Hyo-Shin leaps to her death from the roof a school building. Soon, Hyo-Shin's spirit unleashes unbridle terror upon her former school.

=== Wishing Stairs (2003) ===
Two young beautiful friends, Jin-Sung and So-Hee, have forged a "close" relationship, but this is challenged when the ballet school holds its annual competition to see who will go forward to the national competition and win a scholarship to a Russian ballet school. The better of the two friends, So-Hee looks all set to win, when it becomes apparent that Jin-Sung is becoming more and more jealous. She then bumps into Hae-Ju, a former fat girl who stuffed her face all day and appeared quite mad, who reveals that she is now thin because of the wishing stairs and the synonymous appearance of the 29th step. Jin-Sung then decides to give the stairs a go herself. When the 29th step appears she wishes that she could be the one who wins the ballet scholarship. When So-Hee falls down a flight of stairs and becomes crippled, she commits suicide by jumping from her hospital window. With So-Hee gone, Jin-Sung wins the ballet competition. Hae-Ju goes back to the wishing stairs and asks for one more wish.

=== Voice (2005) ===
This installment follows the story of Young-Eun, a timid high school student who dies mysteriously while singing in the school's music room. But even in death, Young-Eun's voice continues to be heard by her best friend, Sun-Min. Although startled by this supernatural development, Sun-Min adapts rather quickly to the situation and tries to uncover the reasons for her friend's untimely demise. But Sun-Min's absolute faith in her dearly departed friend is soon shaken when a plague of mysterious deaths start to occur on campus! Are these murders Young-Eun's doing? Or could the culprit be someone far more sinister?

=== A Blood Pledge (2009) ===
After her sister Eun-ju (Kyeong-ah Jang) commits suicide by jumping from the roof of her school building, Jeong-eun (Shin-ae Yu) chooses to investigate the unexpected incident further. Speaking to three of her sister's friends she is told that the four girls had previously made a suicide pact and that Eun-ju was the only one to fully commit. But now that the other girls have abandoned their friend and cheated the pledge, Eun-ju has come back from beyond the grave to make them pay.

=== Whispering Corridors 6: The Humming (2021) ===
Strange things are happening in the old closed third-floor bathroom of Eun-Hee's old high school. Eun-Hee just started working there as the vice-principal. For some reason, she has lost her memories of her high school days. Meanwhile, a student named Ha-Young, a victim of school bullying, had a reputation of being the trouble maker at the school. Eun-Hee felt bad for Ha-Young and wants to help her. One day, Ha-Young was in the third floor closed bathroom when she heard a ghost whispering there. She was very troubled by this. She went to Eun-Hee for counseling, and she blurted out that Mr. Park, one of the teachers, sexually assaulted her. Eun-Hee did not believe her right away. Ha-Young ended up running out of the office and distrusting Eun-Hee after that meeting. Meanwhile, Eun-Hee was inexplicably suffering from visual and auditory hallucinations now and then. She was seeing a female student with an injured face in her hallucinations. Eun-Hee wants to unravel what's going on with the help of her psychiatrist.
