= Janghwa Hongryeon jeon (1924 film) =

1924 Korean film by Park Jung-hyun

Jang-hwa and Hong-ryeon
- Hangul: 장화홍련전
- Hanja: 薔花紅蓮傳
- RR: Janghwa Hongryeon jeon
- MR: Changhwa Hongnyŏn chŏn
- Directed by: Park Jung-hyun (박정현)
- Written by: Na Woon-gyu
- Produced by: Hyeong-hwang Kim; Ku-yeong Lee
- Starring: Ok-hui Kim; Seol-ja Kim; Ha So-yeong; Na Woon-gyu
- Release date: 5 September 1924
- Running time: 115 Minutes
- Country: Korea
- Languages: Silent film Korean intertitles
- Budget: 1,500 won

Jang-hwa and Hong-ryeon (literally The Story of Janghwa and Hongryeon) is a 1924 Korean silent film, the first feature film produced entirely by Korean filmmakers. The film is based on a popular Korean fairy tale Janghwa Hongryeon jeon which had been adapted into film versions in 1924, 1936, 1956, 1962 and 1972. Park Seung Pil served as the byeonsa for this film.

== Cast ==
- Ok-hui Kim - Janghwa
- Seol-ja Kim - Hong-ryeon
- Byeong-ryong Choe
- Jeong-sik Yu
