= Sympathy for Mr. Vengeance =

2002 South Korean thriller film

- Promotional release poster
- Hangul: 복수는 나의 것
- Hanja: 復讐는 나의 것
- RR: Boksuneun naui geot
- MR: Poksunŭn naŭi kŏt
- Directed by: Park Chan-wook
- Written by: Park Chan-wook; Lee Jae-soon; Lee Moo-young; Lee Yong-jong
- Produced by: Im Jin-gyu
- Starring: Song Kang-ho; Shin Ha-kyun; Bae Doona
- Cinematography: Kim Byung-il
- Edited by: Kim Sang-bum
- Music by: Baik Hyun-jhin; Jang Young-gyu
- Production companies: Studio Box; TMS Entertainment/Seoul Movie
- Distributed by: CJ Entertainment; Palisades Tartan
- Release date: March 29, 2002
- Running time: 129 minutes
- Country: South Korea
- Language: Korean

Sympathy for Mr. Vengeance (Korean: 복수는 나의 것; lit. 'Vengeance Is Mine') is a 2002 South Korean neo-noir crime thriller film directed by Park Chan-wook, who co-wrote the script with Lee Jae-soon, Lee Moo-young, and Lee Yong-jong. Starring Song Kang-ho, Shin Ha-kyun, and Bae Doona, the film follows an ill-fated kidnapping of a wealthy man's daughter, leading to a path of vengeance.

Sympathy for Mr. Vengeance did not fare well commercially upon its initial release in South Korea and garnered generally mixed reviews. Despite this, it won several awards. It is the first installment in director Park's thematic Vengeance Trilogy, and is followed by Oldboy (2003) and Lady Vengeance (2005).

== Plot ==
Ryu is a deaf-mute man who works in a factory. His ailing sister is in desperate need of a kidney transplant. Unfortunately Ryu's blood type is not a match. After he loses his job, Ryu contacts a group of black market organ dealers to exchange one of his kidneys as well as ₩10 million (about $7,200 US) for one that his sister can use. However, the dealers disappear after taking Ryu's kidney and severance money. A legitimate kidney donor is found, but after having been conned by the organ dealers, Ryu is unable to afford the operation. To raise money, Yeong-mi, Ryu's radical anarchist girlfriend, suggests kidnapping the daughter of the executive who fired Ryu. They observe the executive with company president Park Dong-jin arriving at the latter's home one day, where one of Dong-jin's former employees, Peng, attempts to commit suicide in front of them. Ryu and Yeong-mi change their plan, deciding to kidnap Dong-jin's young daughter Yu-sun instead.

Yu-sun stays with Ryu's sister, who believes that Ryu is babysitting Yu-sun. Ryu, his sister, and Yeong-Mi treat Yu-Sun with kindness while she is with her kidnappers, and when Yu-Sun reveals that her mom left the house after her parents' divorce, Ryu makes a necklace for Yu-Sun adorned with beads and seashells. While Ryu's sister blow-dries Yu-Sun's hair, she asks her to come visit her again and gives her a note with her phone number. She then discovers Ryu's job termination paper in his pants pocket while doing laundry and calls Ryu's employer to inquire. Meanwhile, Ryu and Yeong-mi send a request for ransom to Dong-jin, and he obliges.

Upon returning home with the ransom money, Ryu discovers that his sister learned that Yu-sun was kidnapped and, not wanting to be a burden any longer, killed herself in the bathtub. Ryu takes Yu-sun and his sister's body to a riverbed they frequented as children to bury her. Distracted by the burial and unable to hear, Ryu is unaware when Yu-sun slips into the river, where she drowns. A disabled wanderer steals Yu-Sun's necklace.

After Yu-sun's body is discovered by the authorities, a deeply mournful Dong-jin hires the detective on the case to find her kidnappers with bribe money from selling his company and house. The detective finds Ryu's sister's note on Yu-Sun and searches their apartment, but the place is abandoned and they cannot link the murder. Dong-Jin suspects that Peng is behind the murder, but they find Peng and his family dead by suicide in their home. Dong-Jin realizes one of their children is barely alive and takes him to the hospital, hoping to save him.

Dong-Jin returns to Ryu's apartment and overhears a local radio program where the host reads a letter Ryu has sent about the painful death of his sister. Dong-Jin visits the radio station and sees a painting that Ryu has sent along with the letter depicting his sister's burial and Yu-Sun's death. Dong-jin finds Ryu's sister's corpse by the riverbed, where he interacts with the disabled man who witnessed Ryu burying his sister, and finds the necklace Yu-Sun was wearing in her ransom picture. He begins to piece together the identities of Ryu and Yeong-mi.

Ryu, armed with a baseball bat, locates the organ traffickers, murders them, and eats their kidneys to avenge his sister's death, receiving a stab wound in the process. Meanwhile, Dong-jin finds Yeong-mi and tortures her with electricity, also killing a deliveryman who comes to her apartment. She apologizes for Yu-sun's death but warns Dong-jin that her terrorist friends will kill him if she dies. Unfazed, Dong-jin electrocutes her. Ryu returns to Yeong-mi's apartment and sees the police removing her corpse. Dong-jin locates Ryu's new whereabouts and waits for Ryu to return. He knocks Ryu unconscious with a booby trap. He takes Ryu to the riverbed where his daughter died and drags him into the water. Dong-jin slashes Ryu's Achilles tendons and waits for him to drown. He then gets a call from the hospital as Peng's child has died. After Dong-jin dismembers Ryu's corpse, Yeong-mi's anarchist associates arrive and stab Dong-jin, pin a note to his chest with a knife and leave him to die.

== Cast ==
- Song Kang-ho as Park Dong-jin, Yu-sun's father and the president of a manufacturing company who is a friend of Ryu's employers
- Shin Ha-kyun as Ryu, a deaf-mute factory worker trying to pay his sister's hospital bills
- Bae Doona as Cha Yeong-mi, Ryu's girlfriend of several years, member of an anarchist group, and former Undongkwon.
- Im Ji-eun as Ryu's sister, who is in need of a kidney transplant
- Han Bo-bae as Yu-sun, Dong-jin's young daughter
- Lee Dae-yeon as Choi, the investigator hired by Dong-jin
- Ryoo Seung-bum as a mentally disabled man at the lake
- Ryoo Seung-wan as a food delivery man at Cha's apartment
- Oh Kwang-rok as an anarchist
- Lee Kan-hee as Park Dong-jin's ex-wife
- Jung Jae-young as Dong-jin's ex-wife's new husband

== Reception ==
=== Box office ===
Sympathy for Mr. Vengeance opened in South Korea on March 29, 2002, and had a worldwide box office gross of US$1,954,937. The film received a low-profile North American theatrical release from Tartan Films beginning August 19, 2005, over three years after it debuted in South Korea. In its opening weekend, it collected US$9,827 (US$3,276 per screen) from three New York City theaters. It played on six screens at its most widespread, and its total North American box office take was US$45,243.

=== Critical response ===
On the review aggregator website Rotten Tomatoes, the film has an approval rating of 53% based on 58 reviews, with an average rating of 6.16/10. The website's critical consensus reads: "Though Park directs with stylistic flair, this revenge thriller is more excessively gruesome than thrilling." On Metacritic, the film has a weighted average score of 59/100 based on 21 reviews, indicating "mixed or average reviews".

G. Allen Johnson of the San Francisco Chronicle called the film "a waste", referring to it as "so bloody, scatologically violent and consistently shocking, [that] it seems to have no larger purpose than itself – which is pretty grim." Manohla Dargis of The New York Times wrote that "it is a drag that the film never rises to the level of its director's obvious ability", stating that "the violence [in the film] carries no meaning beyond the creator's ego." Daniel Eagan of Film Journal International called the film "glossy, morbid and childishly provocative", praising its visual style but criticizing director Park's "curdled vision". Michael Phillips of the Chicago Tribune wrote: "[It] is a rigorously planned film. It's also a disingenuous one, somber in tone, callow at its core."

Derek Elley of Variety called the film "a gripping psychodrama, marbled with blackly ironic humor". The Guardian's Peter Bradshaw gave the film a score of three out of five stars, calling it "deeply twisted and bizarre" but noting its "weirdly nightmarish conviction." Wesley Morris of The Boston Globe gave the film a positive review, calling it "a pristine-looking movie with astounding framing and a deftly handled sociopolitical bent", and concluding that, "despite the coldblooded killing and trail of the dead, Mr. Vengeance feels warmly suffused with life." In her review of the film for The A.V. Club, Tasha Robinson wrote that Park's "style is as bold and uncompromising as his story, which seems designed to show how revenge dehumanizes more than it satisfies, even for people who wholly deserve revenge. [...] It's a difficult balancing act, but Park crafts his layers carefully and masterfully."

== Awards ==
2002 Busan Film Critics Awards

- Best Film
- Best Director – Park Chan-wook

2002 Chunsa Film Art Awards

- Best Music – Baik Hyun-jhin and Jang Young-gyu (UhUhBoo Project)

2002 Korean Association of Film Critics Awards

- Best Director – Park Chan-wook
- Best Screenplay – Park Chan-wook, Lee Jae-soon, Lee Moo-young and Lee Yong-jong

2002 Korean Film Awards

- Best Cinematography – Kim Byung-il
- Best Editing – Kim Sang-bum
- Best Lighting – Park Hyun-won

2002 Director's Cut Awards

- Best Director – Park Chan-wook

== Remake ==
In January 2010, Warner Bros. acquired the rights for an American remake of the film. Brian Tucker was attached to write the screenplay, to be produced by Lorenzo di Bonaventura and Mark Vahradian, in a team-up with CJ Entertainment.

== See also ==
- List of films featuring the deaf and hard of hearing
