= Janghwa Hongryeon jeon =

Korean folktale

- Hangul: 장화홍련전
- Hanja: 薔花紅蓮傳
- RR: Janghwa Hongryeon jeon
- MR: Changhwa Hongnyŏn chŏn

Janghwa Hongryeon jeon (literally The Story of Janghwa and Hongryeon) is a Joseon-era Korean folktale.

== Story ==
=== Introduction ===
Once upon a time, there was a man named Muryong whose wife had a dream where an angel gave her a beautiful flower. Ten months later, she gave birth to a pretty baby girl, who the couple named "Janghwa" ("Rose Flower"). Two years later, they had another pretty girl and named her "Hongryeon" ("Red Lotus"). Unfortunately, the mother died when Hongryeon was five years old; and soon thereafter, the father remarried to continue his line. The new stepmother was both ugly and cruel. She hated her stepdaughters, but hid those feelings, only to reveal them once she had three sons in a row, which gave her a good deal of power, and she abused the girls in every possible way. But Janghwa and Hongryeon never told their father about any of it.

=== Conflict ===
When Janghwa came of age and got engaged, their father told his second wife to help Janghwa plan a wedding ceremony. Stepmother became angry, not wanting to spend a penny of "her family's money" or "her sons' future fortune" on Janghwa. So she came up with a dirty plan: One night when Janghwa was sleeping, Stepmother had her eldest son put a dead skinned rat in Janghwa's bed. Early the next morning, she brought Father to Janghwa's room, telling him she'd had a bad dream about her elder stepdaughter. When she pulled back the covers on Janghwa's bed, something that looked like a very bloody miscarriage shocked everybody in the room. Stepmother accused Janghwa of unchaste behavior, having an out-of-wedlock child. Father believed this. Janghwa did not know what to do so she ran out of the house to a small pond in the nearby woods. Stepmother ordered her eldest son to follow Janghwa and push her into the pond. As Janghwa drowned, suddenly came a huge tiger who attacked Stepmother's eldest son, taking one leg and one arm from him.

Stepmother got what she wanted—Janghwa's death—but at the cost of her own son's health. She turned her anger upon Hongryeon, hating and abusing this remaining stepdaughter more than ever. Unable to bear this treatment on top of the loss of her beloved sister, Hongryeon soon followed Janghwa; her body was found in the same pond in which Janghwa had drowned.

After that, whenever a new mayor came to the village, he was found dead a day after his arrival. As this kept happening, mysterious rumors spread through the village, but no one knew for sure what had happened to the men or for what reason.

=== Resolution ===
A brave young man came to the village as a new mayor. He was aware of the deaths of predecessors, but he was not afraid for his own life. When night came, he was sitting in his room when his candle was suddenly blown out and gruesome noises filled the air. The door opened to reveal no one, at first, but then the new mayor saw two young female ghosts. He asked them who they were and why they had killed the previous mayors. Weeping, the elder sister explained that all they wanted was to let people know the truth: the elder girl had not been an unchaste girl who committed suicide in shame. She had been framed by her stepmother and murdered by her eldest half-brother. The mayor asked the ghost of Janghwa for any evidence of this. Janghwa told him to examine the miscarried fetus that Stepmother had shown to the villagers.

=== Conclusion ===
The next morning, the new mayor did what the sisters' ghosts had asked him to do. He summoned Father, Stepmother, and the eldest son and examined the fetus that Stepmother insisted had come from Janghwa's body. When he split it with a knife, it was revealed to be a rat. Stepmother and her eldest son were sentenced to death. Father, however, was set free because the mayor thought Father had known nothing of Stepmother's evil plan and in fact was just another victim.

Years later, Father married again. On the night of his third wedding, he saw his two daughters in a dream. They said that since things were as they should be, they wanted to come back to him. Nine months later, Father's third wife delivered twin girls. Father named these twins "Janghwa" and "Hongryeon" and loved them very much. The new family lived happily ever after.

== Films ==
The story has been adapted to film a number of times, including:

- Janghwa Hongryeon jeon (1924) directed by Park Jun-hyun
- Janghwa Hongryeon jeon (1936) directed by Hong Gae-myeong
- Janghwa Heungryeon jeon (1956) directed by Jeong Chang-hwa
- Dae Jang-hwa Hong-ryeon jeon (1962) directed by Jeong Chang-hwa
- Janghwa Hongryeon jeon (1972) directed by Lee Yu-seob
- A Tale of Two Sisters (2003) directed by Kim Jee-woon
- The Uninvited (2009) directed by The Guard Brothers

== Drama ==
- Love and Obsession (TV series)

== See also ==
- Korean mythology
- Kongjwi and Patjwi
- Heungbu and Nolbu
