= Son Eun-seo =

South Korean actress (born 1985)

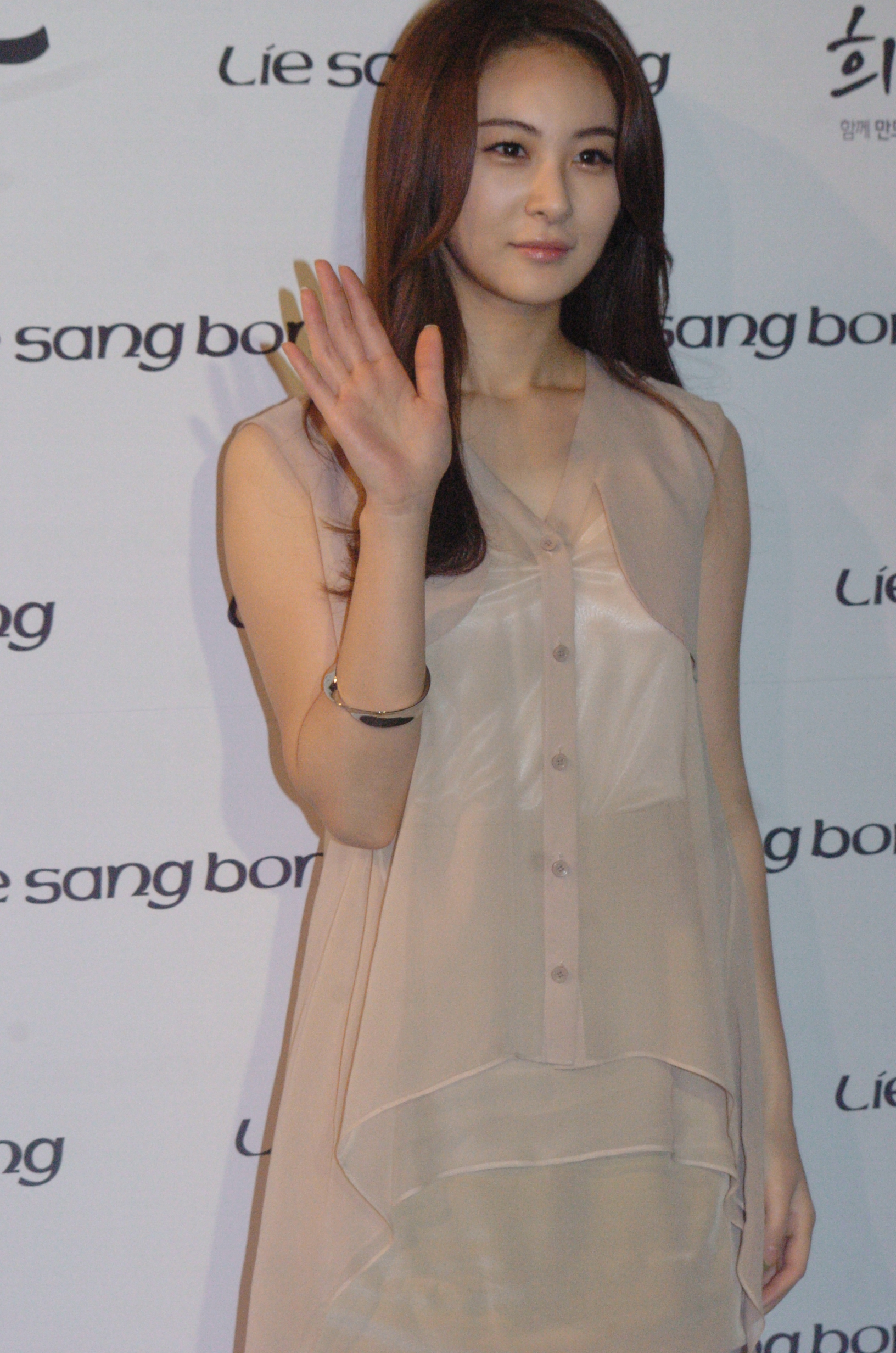
- Son in 2012
- Born: Son Ji-yeon; June 26, 1985 (age 41); Busan, South Korea
- Education: Dongduk Women's University – Broadcasting and Entertainment
- Occupation: Actress
- Years active: 2006–present
- Agent: Just Entertainment
- Spouse: Jang Won-seok (m. 2023)

Korean name
- Hangul: 손지연
- RR: Son Jiyeon
- MR: Son Chiyŏn

Stage name
- Hangul: 손은서
- RR: Son Eunseo
- MR: Son Ŭnsŏ

Son Eun-seo (Korean: 손은서; born June 26, 1985), born Son Ji-yeon, 손지연, is a South Korean actress.

== Personal life ==
Son has been in a relationship with Jang Won-seok, CEO of BA Entertainment since the end of 2022. On October 4, 2023, Son's agency announced the couple would be getting married in November. The couple married in a private ceremony in Hawaii on November 3, 2023.

== Filmography ==
=== Television series ===
Year	Title	Role	Notes/Ref.
2008	Don't Ask Me About the Past		
2009	The Queen Returns	Kim Ye-na	
2010	Flames of Desire	Kim Mi-jin	
2011	Spy Myung-wol	Yoo Da-hae	
2011	Noriko, Go to Seoul	Radio DJ	
2011	My Daughter the Flower	Eun Chae-kyung	
2012	Love Rain	Baek Hye-jung (1970s)	
2012	May Queen	Jang In-hwa	
2013	Love in Her Bag	Kim Seo-hyun / Eun Kyung-hee	
2013	My Love from the Star	Hwang Jin-yi	Cameo (episode 4)
2014	Drama Festival: "The Diary of Hyung Young-Dang"	Min Hee-jung	one act-drama
2015	My Heart Twinkle Twinkle	Chun Geum-bi	
2015	The Virtual Bride	Cha Young-ah	
2015	Reply 1988	Sung Duk-sun's colleague	Cameo
2016	Bring It On, Ghost	Hong Myung-hee	
2017–present	Voice	Park Eun-soo	Season 1–4
2017	Queen for Seven Days	Jang Nok-su	
2018	Switch	Choi Min-ah	Cameo
2019	Spring Turns to Spring	Choi Seo-jin	
2023	Payback: Money and Power	Myeong Se-hee	
2024	Seoul Busters	Seo Eun-seo	

=== Web series ===
Year	Title	Role	Notes/Ref.
2022	Kiss Sixth Sense	Young Adult Kim Sa-ra	Cameo
2022	Big Bet		

=== Film ===
Year	Title	Role
2008	Humming	Veterinarian
2009	If You Were Me 4	Gyu-ri (segment "Relay")
2009	A Blood Pledge	So-yi
2013	Private Island	In-ah
2013	Tumbleweed	Mi-yeon
2016	Duel: Final Round	So-eun

=== Music video appearances ===
Year	Song title	Artist
2009	"Obvious Woman"	2NB
2011	"Star"	Jay Park
2012	"Hello & Goodbye"	Myname
2012	"Tease Me"	Seo In-guk
2014	"New You"	Seulong

== Awards and nominations ==
Name of the award ceremony, year presented, category, nominee of the award, and the result of the nomination
Award ceremony	Year	Category	Nominee / Work	Result	Ref.
Asia Model Awards	2012	CF Model Award	Son Eun-seo	Won	
Director's Cut Awards	2023	Best New Actress in Television	Big Bet	Nominated	
MBC Drama Awards	2012	Best New Actress	May Queen	Nominated	
SBS Drama Awards	2023	Excellence Award, Actress in a Miniseries Genre/Action Drama	Payback	Nominated	
