= The Vengeance Trilogy =

Trilogy of films directed by Park Chan-wook

- The Vengeance Trilogy Blu-ray
- Directed by: Park Chan-wook
- Screenplay by: Park Chan-wook (1–3); Lee Jae-sun (1); Lee Jong-yong (1); Lee Mu-yeong (1); Hwang Jo-yun (2); Lim Chun-hyeong (2); Jeong Seo-Gyeong (3)
- Produced by: Lee Jae-sun (1); Lim Jin-gyu (1); Kim Dong-joo (2); Lim Seung-yong (2); Cho Young-wuk (3); J. J. Harris (3); Beth Kono (3); Lee Chun-yeong (3); Lee Tae-hun (3)
- Starring: Choi Min-sik (2–3); Song Kang-ho (1); Shin Ha-kyun (1); Bae Doona (1); Lee Young-ae (3); Kim Shi-hoo (3); (See below)
- Cinematography: Chung Chung-hoon (2–3); Kim Byeong-il (1)
- Edited by: Kim Sang-bum (1–3); Kim Jae-bum (3)
- Music by: Jo Yeong-wook (2); Choi Seung-hyun (3)
- Production companies: CJ Entertainment (1); Studio Box (1); Egg Films (2); Show East (2); CJ Capital Investment (3); Centurion Investment (3); Ilshin Capital Investments (3); Korea Capital Investment (3); Moho Films (3); Samsung Venture Capital (3); TSJ Entertainment (3)
- Distributed by: CJ Entertainment (1, 3); Tartan Films (US/UK); Show East (2)
- Country: South Korea
- Languages: Korean (1–3); English (3); Japanese (3)
- Budget: Total (3 films): $11.5 million
- Box office: Total (3 films): $40.7 million

The Vengeance Trilogy (Korean: 복수 삼부작) is a South Korean thematically linked film trilogy directed by Park Chan-wook, comprising Sympathy for Mr. Vengeance (2002), Oldboy (2003) and Lady Vengeance (2005). Each film deals with the themes of revenge, ethics, violence and salvation. The films are not narratively connected and were dubbed a trilogy by international critics due to their thematic links.

== Films ==
=== Sympathy for Mr. Vengeance (2002) ===
The first installment in Park's trilogy was the 2002 film, Sympathy for Mr. Vengeance, a bleak and violent tale of revenge gone wrong. It tells the story of a deaf-mute man who kidnaps a young girl to pay for his sister's much-needed kidney transplant. When the young girl accidentally dies, her bereaved father goes on a search for answers and vengeance. The film did relatively poorly at the box office in South Korea finishing 30th in ticket rank. It covered less than half its production costs in both domestic and international box office gates, where in the U.S. it garnered gross revenues of $45,243.

=== Oldboy (2003) ===
Park's next film in the trilogy was the hugely successful 2003 film, Oldboy. It told the story of a man who is imprisoned for fifteen years and then released with no explanation as to why he was confined and released. Now, he has been given five days to learn his captor's true identity and find out why he was imprisoned, or his new love interest will be killed. The film was very well received at film festivals and at the box office in South Korea. It won the Grand Prix award at the 2004 Cannes Film Festival and received positive reviews from critics. The film has gained a cult following in the years following its release and is considered a modern classic.

A remake was directed by Spike Lee in 2013.

=== Lady Vengeance (2005) ===
The third and final installment in the trilogy was the 2005 film, Lady Vengeance. The film tells the tale of an innocent young woman released from prison after doing time for a child-killer still at large. Once freed, she seeks out her long-lost daughter and unveils her plan for revenge against the ghastly man for whom she served time. This film was also well received by critics and South Korean audiences alike. It grossed $7,382,034 in its opening week and competed for the Golden Lion at the 62nd Venice International Film Festival in September 2005.

== Recurring cast members ==
Actor	Roles		
Actor	Sympathy for Mr. Vengeance	Oldboy	Lady Vengeance
Oh Kwang-rok	Anarchist	Suicidal man	Se-hyun's father
Song Kang-ho	Park Dong-jin	—N/a	Hired assassin 1 (cameo)
Shin Ha-kyun	Ryu	—N/a	Hired assassin 2 (cameo)
Choi Min-sik	—N/a	Oh Dae-su	Mr. Baek
Yoo Ji-tae	—N/a	Lee Woo-jin	Adult Won-mo (cameo)
Kang Hye-jung	—N/a	Mi-do	TV announcer (cameo)
Oh Dal-su	—N/a	Park Cheol-woong	Mr. Chang
Kim Byeong-ok	—N/a	Mr. Han	Preacher

== Reception ==
Film	Rotten Tomatoes	Metacritic
Sympathy for Mr. Vengeance	54% (56 reviews)	56 (21 reviews)
Oldboy	82% (147 reviews)	77 (32 reviews)
Lady Vengeance	76% (86 reviews)	75 (23 reviews)

== Home media ==
In the United Kingdom, Tartan Films issued a box set on DVD. In the United States, Vivendi Entertainment released the same set.
