= Gupse Özay =

Turkish actress (born 1984)

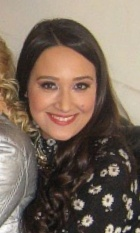
- Born: 30 July 1984 (age 42); İzmir, Turkey
- Education: Ege University
- Occupations: Actress, scriptwriter, director
- Spouse: Barış Arduç (m. 2020)
- Children: 1

Gupse Özay (born 30 July 1984) is a Turkish actress, scriptwriter and director.

== Life and career ==
Gupse Özay was born in İzmir, Turkey. Her paternal family is of Abkhazian descent. Her maternal family is of Kabardian descent. Her mother is co-founder of Yeşiller Party. Her father and her brother are lawyers.

She studied at Radio Television and Cinema Department of Ege University. Her role is Nurhayat in Gülse Birsel's hit sitcom Yalan Dünya.

== Filmography ==
TV series
Year	Title	Role	Screenwriter	Director	Note
2012–2014	Yalan Dünya	Nurhayat	No	No	
Web series
Year	Title	Role	Screenwriter	Director	Note
2025	Platonik		Yes	No	
Film
Year	Title	Role	Screenwriter	Director	Note
2014	Deliha	Zeliha	Yes	No	
2016	Küçük Esnaf	Burcu	No	No	
2016	Görümce	Yeliz	Yes	No	
2017	Tatlım Tatlım	Tatlım	No	No	
2018	Deliha 2	Zeliha	Yes	Yes	
2020	Eltilerin Savaşı	Sultan	Yes	No	
2024	Lohusa	Burcu	Yes	No	
Animated
Year	Title	Role	Screenwriter	Director	Note
2025	Gupi		Yes	No	
Short film
Year	Title	Role	Screenwriter	Director	Note
2015	Eed Wahda (One Hand)	Noor	No	No	
Dubbing
Year	Title				
2015	Inside Out				
2024	Inside Out 2				
Commercial
Year	Title				
2008	Turkcell				
2012–2016	Dacia				
2018	Buka Mobilya				
2020–2021	Peyman				
2021–2022	Garanti BBVA Bonus				
2022	Youplus				

=== Documentary ===
- Yaman Yaşamışım
