= A Blood Pledge =

- Theatrical poster
- Directed by: Lee Jong-yong
- Written by: Lee Jong-yong
- Produced by: Lee Chun-yeon
- Starring: Oh Yeon-seo; Jang Kyung-ah; Son Eun-seo; Song Chae-yoon; Yoo Shin-ae
- Cinematography: Kang Seung-gi
- Edited by: Kim Sang-bum
- Production company: Cine2000
- Release date: June 18, 2009
- Running time: 88 minutes
- Country: South Korea
- Language: Korean
- Box office: $3,392,086

A Blood Pledge (Korean: 여고괴담 5: 동반자살; RR: Yeogogoedam 5: dongbanjasal; lit. 'Ghost Stories in a Girls' High: Suicide Pact') is a 2009 K-Horror film, and the fifth installment of the Whispering Corridors series of South Korean horror films set in girls' high schools that began with 1998's film of the same name. Aside from the setting and overall themes, it is unrelated to the other films in the series.

== Plot ==
The story begins with the pledge: four students, Eun-Joo, So-Hee, Yoo-jin, and Eun-young, pledge that they will die together that night. Eun-Joo jumps from the roof of her school, committing suicide. Her sister Jeong-Eun sees her jump. The next day in the school office, So-Hee admits that she was on the roof with Eun-Joo when she jumped.

The three girls become paranoid about the death of Eun-Joo, and secrets about why each girl had a reason to jump start to surface. So-Hee becomes depressed about the death, unlike the other two. Jeong-Eun confronts So-Hee about her sister's death but So-Hee repeats that she doesn't know what happened. Rumors start to spread around the school. Many girls accuse So-Hee of killing Eun-Joo as their relationship had become strained in the past year. Another girl claims that Eun-Joo killed herself because she was pregnant. That evening, Eun-young is beaten by her father for having low grades. The next day, she begs Yoo-jin to let her sleep at her home.

So-Hee has flashbacks of the time when she was friends with Eun-Joo and feels guilty. Joo-yeon tells So-Hee that because she pushed Eun-Joo away, she is to blame for her death. Joo-Yeong is later killed by Eun-Joo.

Eun-young sees Eun-Joo's ghost several times, which terrifies her. So-Hee finds a dismembered body, possibly Joo-Yeon's, in a classroom locker. Eun-young tells Yoo-jin that Eun-Joo promised she wouldn't kill any of them if they came clean. Later, Yoo-Jin and So-Hee see Eun-young on the roof. They beg her not to jump but she does, claiming that she is no longer afraid and that she feels good because she won't have to go back to her abusive home.

So-Hee enters the church to apologize for her actions, followed by Yoo-jin. A flashback shows So-Hee with her boyfriend, Ki-Ho. Yoo-jin used to date Ki-Ho and made So-Hee and Eun-young stop being friends with Eun-Joo. In the present, Yoo-Jin says that she would kill herself if she didn't make top grades. Eun-young says she tried to kill herself last year because of her father, and So-Hee confesses her pregnancy. Yoo-jin says she doesn't want to lose to So-Hee again, who is better at schoolwork, and she and Eun-young decide to pretend to jump.

Yoo-jin grabs So-Hee and ties a microphone around her neck, stringing her up. Eun-Joo storms in and strangles Yoo-jin. In a flashback, Eun-Joo had told So-Hee that she wanted to die together with So-Hee one day. However, on the day of Eun-Joo's suicide, So-Hee confessed her pregnancy and swore that she was going to kill herself and take the baby with her. The four girls met on the roof, holding hands. Before the jump, Eun-young and Yoo-jin stepped back. So-Hee realized this and frantically tried to stop Eun-Joo but it was too late: Eun-Joo jumped to her death.

The next scene is of So-Hee sobbing with Eun-Joo on the roof. Eun-Joo smiles and tells So-Hee that she missed her and wanted to return, but knew she would scare So-Hee. So-Hee hugs her and says she is sorry, begging Eun-Joo to take her with her. However, Jeong-Eun grabs So-Hee's hand, and Eun-Joo tells So-Hee that she must stay to take care of Jeong-Eun: So-Hee is now Jeong-Eun's older sister.

Afterwards, So-Hee decides to keep the baby, while Ki-Ho has moved on with another girl. The two-step into an elevator, and as the door is closing, the girl's face turns into Eun-Joo's.

== Cast ==
Main characters

- Oh Yeon-seo as Yoo-jin
- Jang Kyung-ah as Eun-joo
- Son Eun-seo as So-Hee
- Song Chae-yoon as Eun-young
- Yoo Shin-ae as Jung-eun

Supporting characters

- Park Ga-hee as Joo-yeon
- Park Jung-yoon as Park Jung-yoon
- Kim Soo-hyun as Kang Min-joo
- Lee Mi-so as Lee Mi-so
- Kang Byul as Kang Bo-yoon
- Jung Min-ji as Jung Min-ji
- Hwang Seung-eon as Park Ji-mi
- Choi Ji-soo as Im Se-ri
- Lee Seul-gi as Lee Hyun-jin
- Jung Hye-in as Jung Hye-in
- Choi Min-sung as Ki-ho
- Oh Jung-won as Ki-ho's mother
- Kim So-yeon as Dam-im
- Park Yong-jin as Eun-young's father
- Shin Yeon-sook as Nun

== See also ==
- List of South Korean films of 2009
