= Park Ye-jin =

South Korean actress (born 1981)

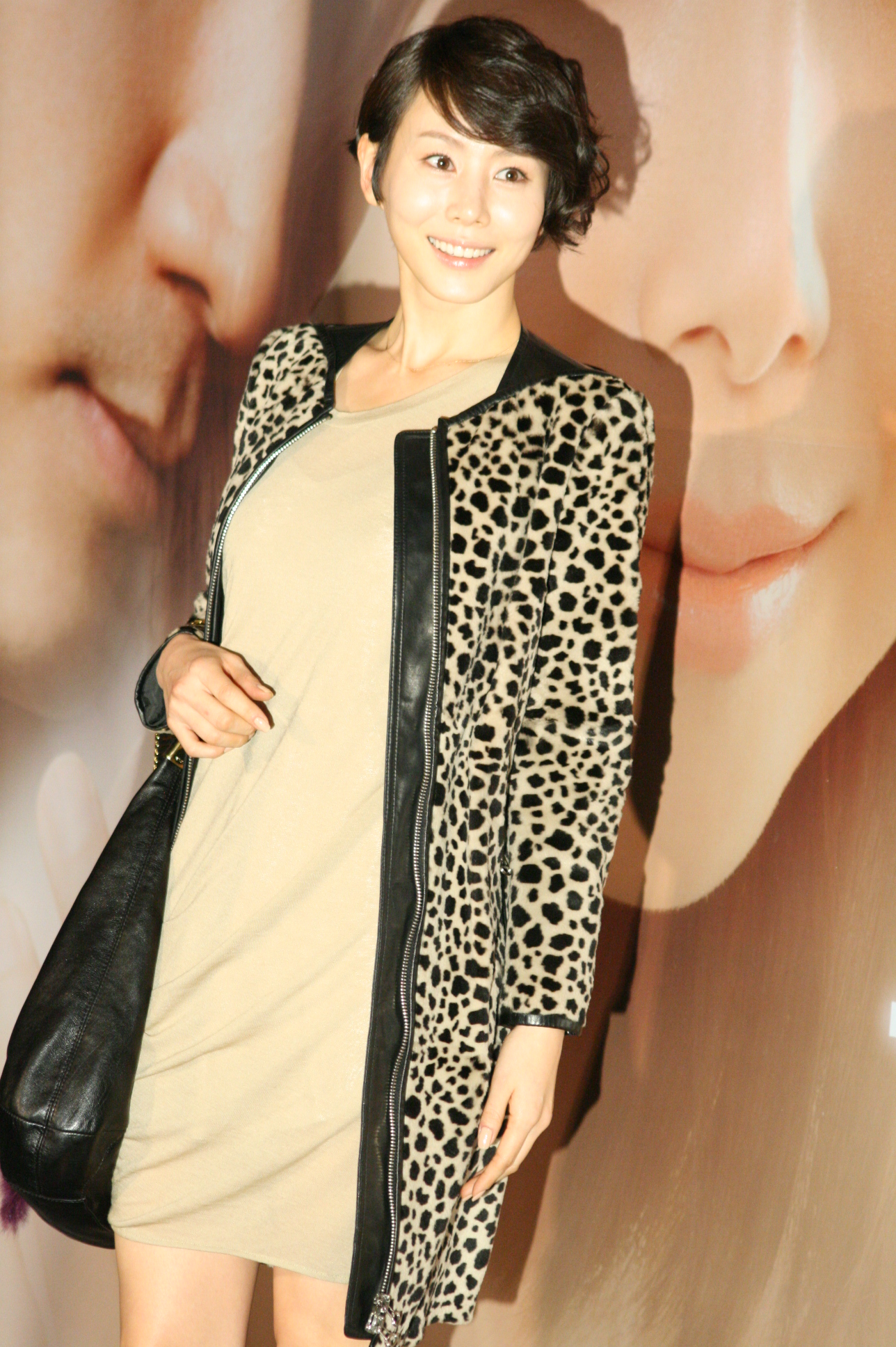
- Park in 2009
- Born: April 1, 1981 (age 45); Seoul, South Korea
- Education: Chung-Ang University
- Occupation: Actress
- Years active: 1998–present
- Agent: Saram Entertainment
- Spouse: Park Hee-soon (m. 2015)

Korean name
- Hangul: 박예진
- Hanja: 朴藝珍
- RR: Bak Yejin
- MR: Pak Yejin

Park Ye-jin (Korean: 박예진; born April 1, 1981) is a South Korean actress.

== Career ==
Park Ye-jin made her acting debut in the 1999 horror film Memento Mori, then appeared in leading and supporting roles in several TV series and films, notably What Happened in Bali 2004, Dae Jo-yeong 2006, and Again, My Love 2009 (also known as Hateful But Once Again). But her popularity increased when she became a regular cast member on the first season of variety show Family Outing, in which she showed a different image and earned the nickname "sweet, yet scary, Ye-jin." In 2009, Park left the show because of her hectic schedule filming the period drama Queen Seondeok 2009 and the movie Fortune Salon 2009.

After she was cast as Genghis Khan's wife Khulan in the Korea-China-Japan 3D martial arts pic An End to Killing 2013, Park starred in the fantasy romance I Love Lee Tae-ri 2012.

In November 2018, Park signed with Saram Entertainment.

== Personal life ==
=== Relationship and marriage ===
In 2011, it was reported that Park and actor Park Hee-soon were in a relationship. They met two years prior and got close due to friendship formed as artists under the same agency. In January 2016, it was reported that they registered their marriage in 2015. They had a small celebration with family and friends in 2016.

== Filmography ==
=== Films ===
Year	Title	Role
1999	Memento Mori	Hyo-shin
2000	Summer Story	Han Ga-eul
2000	The Rhapsody	Kang Ji-young
2001	No Hope, No Fear (short film)	
2002	Dig or Die	Yoon-ah
2004	Wet Dreams 2	Bride, Sung-eun's older sister (cameo)
2008	Life Is Cool	Kang Yeon-woo
2009	Fortune Salon	Tae-rang
2011	Head	Shin Hong-joo
2011	Mr. Idol	Oh Goo-joo
2013	An End to Killing	Khulan
2020	Josée (film)	Hye-seon

=== Television series ===
Year	Title	Role	Network
1998	LA Arirang		SBS
1999	Ad Madness		KBS2
2001	Four Sisters	Jung Yoo-sun	MBC
2001	That's Perfect		MBC
2002	Since We Met	Jo Hye-won	MBC
2002	Royal Story: Jang Hui-bin	Choi Suk-bin	KBS2
2004	What Happened in Bali	Choi Young-joo	SBS
2004	Little Women	Jung Hye-deuk	SBS
2004	When a Man Is in Love	Park Jung-woo	SBS
2005	Rebirth: Next	Lee Soo-hyun/Choi Yeon-hwa/ Ja Woon-young/Lee Jung-im/ Geum Ga-in	MBC
2006	Thank You Life	Choi Yoon-seo	KBS2
2006	Dae Jo-yeong	Chu-lin	KBS1
2007	The Great Catsby	Persu	tvN
2008	My Lady Boss, My Hero	Shim Sang-goon	OCN
2009	Again, My Love	Choi Yoon-hee	KBS2
2009	Queen Seondeok	Princess Cheonmyeong	MBC
2011	My Princess	Oh Yoon-joo	MBC
2012	I Love Lee Taly	Lee Tae-ri	tvN
2014	Mr. Back	Hong Ji-yoon	MBC
2015	Last	Seo Mi-joo	JTBC
2019	My Country: The New Age	Queen Sindeok	JTBC
2020	Soul Mechanic	Ji Young Won	KBS2

=== Variety shows ===
Year	Title	Network	Notes
2006	Time Machine	MBC	
2008–2009	Family Outing	SBS	Cast member
2008	Mission X Challenge 6	XTM	

=== Music video appearances ===
Year	Song title	Artist
2004	"Go"	K
2006	"Headache"	Kyun Woo and Monday Kiz
2006	"Because of You"	Blue
2008	"Feel Crazy"	MC Mong
2008	"You Are My Lady"	Jung Yup
2010	"Don't Be Good to Me"	Kim Jong-kook
2012	"Merry Christmas, Only You"	Yoon Jong-shin

== Accolades ==
=== Awards and nominations ===
Year	Award	Category	Nominated work	Result
2000	36th Baeksang Arts Awards	Best New Actress (Film)	Memento Mori	Won
2000	20th Korean Association of Film Critics Awards	Best New Actress	Memento Mori	Won
2001	21st Blue Dragon Film Awards	Best New Actress	Memento Mori	Nominated
2007	KBS Drama Awards	Top Excellence Award, Actress	Dae Jo-yeong	Nominated
2008	SBS Entertainment Awards	Popularity Award	Family Outing	Won
2009	MBC Drama Awards	Excellence Award, Actress	Queen Seondeok	Nominated
2009	MBC Drama Awards	Excellence Award, Actress in a Mid-length Drama	Again, My Love	Nominated
2014	MBC Drama Awards	Excellence Award, Actress in a Miniseries	Mr. Back	Nominated

=== Listicles ===
Name of publisher, year listed, name of listicle, and placement
Publisher	Year	Listicle	Placement	Ref.
Forbes	2010	Korea Power Celebrity	25th	
