= Memento Mori (film) =

- Theatrical poster
- Hangul: 여고괴담 두번째 이야기
- Hanja: 女高怪談 두번째 이야기
- RR: Yeogogoedam dubeonjjae iyagi
- MR: Yŏgogoedam tubŏntchae iyagi
- Directed by: Kim Tae-yong; Min Kyu-dong
- Written by: Kim Tae-yong; Min Kyu-dong
- Produced by: Lee Chun-yeon
- Starring: Park Ye-jin; Kim Min-sun; Lee Young-jin; Gong Hyo-jin
- Cinematography: Kim Yun-su
- Edited by: Kim Sang-bum
- Music by: Jo Seong-woo
- Distributed by: Cinema Service
- Release date: December 24, 1999
- Running time: 98 minutes
- Country: South Korea
- Language: Korean

Memento Mori (Korean: 여고괴담 두번째 이야기: 메멘토 모리; lit. 'Second Ghost Story in a Girls' High: Memento Mori') is a 1999 South Korean horror film, and the second installment of the Whispering Corridors film series. It is a sequel to 1998's Whispering Corridors, and is also set in an all-girls high school, but the films are otherwise unrelated. Memento Mori was one of the first Korean commercial films to depict lesbian characters. However, prevailing Korean attitudes constrained its potential to be widely viewed, even more so as the controversial themes targeted the teen demographic.

== Synopsis ==
The film revolves around the relationship between two high school students, Yoo Shi-eun (Lee Young-jin) and Min Hyo-shin (Park Ye-jin). As the two girls become romantically involved, their taboo relationship causes them to be marginalized by the other students. Unable to cope with the social pressures of having a lover of the same sex, Shi-Eun tries to distance herself from the increasingly dependent Hyo-shin. Hyo-shin reacts poorly to Shi-eun's changed attitude, viewing it as both a betrayal and rejection. Hyo-shin consequently commits suicide by jumping off of the school roof. It is also heavily implied that she was pregnant at the time of death, the father being literature teacher Mr. Goh (Hyo-shin had confessed to Shi-eun that she had sex with Mr. Goh) .

The plot unfurls in a nonlinear fashion, often from the perspective of fellow student Soh Min-ah (Kim Min-sun). Min-ah grows increasingly invested in Shi-eun and Hyo-shin when she finds a diary kept between the two alienated girls. This diary allows her disturbing insights into the nature of the relationship and pulls her deeper into a strange chain of events around the school. After Hyo-shin's death, supernatural occurrences start to terrorize all of the students who condemned the relationship. It is later revealed that Hyo-shin's spirit is malevolently haunting the school through the remnants she left behind in the diary.

== Cast ==
- Park Ye-jin as Min Hyo-shin
- Kim Min-sun as Seo Min-ah
- Lee Young-jin as Yoo Shi-eun
- Baek Jong-hak as Mr. Goh
- Han Min
- Kim Jae-in as Yeon-an
- Gong Hyo-jin as Ji-won
- Oh Min-ae as Nurse
- Lee Hye-mi
- Lim Seong-eon

== Release ==
Memento Mori was released in South Korea on December 24, 1999. In the Philippines, the film was released on January 14, 2004.

In 2025, the film was selected by the South Korean film director Kim Se-in for the section 'Our Little History, Please Take Care of Our Future!' at the 30th Busan International Film Festival, recognized as a work that had a profound influence on her creative journey.

== Analysis ==
Despite the increasing visibility of the Korean LGBT movement in the 1990s, when Memento Mori was made, queer films of the time frequently concealed LGBT content behind the guise of other genres, such as horror or romance. According to Kim Pil Ho and C. Colin Singer, the elements of horror featured in Memento Mori, which include telepathy and possession, function as a method of creating distance between the audience's reality and the fantasy of the horror movie, and the characters therein.

Andrew Grossman and Jooran Lee described the queer characters of Memento Mori as the heroes the story is centered around, with the ghostly terror directed at the film's homophobic characters, in contrast with other movies that depicted queer people as inherently ghostly. Choi Jinhee found that the context of highly interdependent, exclusive female friendships which are typical of the frequently gender-segregated South Korean school system makes the jump from the homosocial to the queer relationship of Hyo-shin and Shi-eun plausible to the audience. Kim and Singer, however, argued that this may soften the LGBT themes in Memento Mori as a result of such close relationships being accepted as a "rite of passage".
