= Chung Chang-wha =

South Korean film director (born 1928)

- Born: 1 November 1928 (age 97); Jincheon County, Korea, Empire of Japan
- Other names: Cheng Cheng-Ho; Chung Chang-Wha; Chang Chang-Ho; Cheng Chang-Wha; Jeong Chang-hwa; Chung Chang-Haw; Tsang Chung-Woo; Walter Chung Chang-Hwa
- Education: Seoul National University
- Occupations: Film director, producer, screenwriter
- Years active: 1951–present

Korean name
- Hangul: 정창화
- Hanja: 鄭昌和
- RR: Jeong Changhwa
- MR: Chŏng Ch'anghwa

Chung Chang-wha (Korean: 정창화; born 1 November 1928) is a South Korean film director, producer and screenwriter. Chung made his directorial debut with The Final Temptation (1953) and gained attention only when he released A Sunny Field in 1960. During the 1960s he started collaborating with the Hong Kong film industry. In 1968, he joined Shaw Brothers and directed martial arts classics such as King Boxer (1972) (the first Hong Kong movie to reach No. 1 at the U.S. box office in 1973, also known as Five Fingers of Death). He moved to Golden Harvest in 1973, where he directed numerous productions until he returned to South Korea in 1977 to continue his career.

== Filmography ==
=== Films ===
This is a partial list of films.

- The Final Temptation (1953)
- A Street of Temptation (1954)
- Second Start (1955)
- Janghwa Hongryeon jeon (1956)
- The Palace of Ambition (1957)
- A Sunny Field (1960)
- A Bonanza (1961)
- Jang Hee-bin (1961)
- The Story of Jang-hwa and Hong-ryeon (1962)
- Sunset on the River Sarbin (1965)
- Dangerous Youth (1966)
- Six Assassins (1971)
- King Boxer (a.k.a. Five Fingers of Death) (1972)
- The Devil's Treasure (1973)
- The Association (1975)
- The Double Crossers (1976)
- Broken Oath (1977)

== Awards ==
- 2011 31st Korean Association of Film Critics Awards: Award for Contribution to Cinema
- 2012 11th New York Asian Film Festival: Star Asia Lifetime Achievement Award
- 2015 52nd Grand Bell Awards: Lifetime Achievement Award
