= Wishing Stairs =

- Theatrical release poster
- Hangul: 여고괴담 3: 여우계단
- RR: Yeogogoedam 3: yeougyedan
- MR: Yŏgogoedam 3: yŏugyedan
- Directed by: Yun Jae-yeon
- Written by: Kim Su-ah; Lee Yong-yeon; Eun Si-yeon; Lee Soyoung
- Produced by: Lee Chun-yeon
- Starring: Song Ji-hyo; Park Han-byul; Jo An
- Cinematography: Seo Jeong-min
- Edited by: Kim Sang-bum; Kim Jae-beom
- Music by: Gong Myeong-ah
- Production company: Cine2000
- Distributed by: Cinema Service
- Release dates: July 13, 2003 (PIF Film Festival); August 1, 2003 (South Korea)
- Running time: 97 minutes
- Country: South Korea
- Language: Korean

Wishing Stairs (Korean: 여우계단: 여고괴담 세번째 이야기; RR: Yeougyedan: yeogogoedam sebeonjjae iyagi; lit. 'Vulpine Stairs: the Third Ghost Story in a Girls' High') is a 2003 South Korean horror film. It is the third installment of the Whispering Corridors film series set in girls high schools, but, as with all films in the series, is unrelated to the others; apart from a song being sung in one scene that is a pivotal plot point in Voice.

== Plot ==
Yun Jin-sung (Song Ji-hyo), a modest girl from a humble background and privileged, graceful Kim So-hee (Park Han-byul) are friends studying ballet at an all-girls art school. So-hee mainly dances to please her mother yet expresses natural talent and grace for the art, and gains favoritism from the faculty while Jin-sung, a talented dancer herself, is not as popular and puts much effort in escaping her friend's shadow. Despite circumstances, the two remain close and it is heavily implied that So-hee harbours deeper feelings towards her best friend. Their friendship soon sours, however, when they find themselves competing for a single spot at a Russian ballet school and the odds are heavily in So-hee's favor. Coincidentally, Jin-sung learns from Eom Hye-ju (Jo An), a timid, overweight and severely bullied sculpture student, of an old legend alleging that the twenty eight steps leading up to the school's dormitory will compel a fox spirit to grant a wish to anyone with enough conviction to find the 29th step. Curious, Jin-sung climbs the stairs and upon finding herself on the fabled 29th, eagerly wishes for the coveted spot. To her surprise and anger, So-hee is selected instead. Jin-sung declares her hatred toward So-hee and accidentally sends her down a flight of stairs during a row. So-hee is unconscious and hospitalized.

Jin-sung learns that the injuries render So-hee unable to continue pursuing ballet. She tries to see So-hee to express her remorse, but is turned away in guilt. The next day, she learns that So-hee has committed suicide and since the fight between the two was witnessed by several others, Jin-sung is now subjected to other students' bullying, who believe that she intentionally injured So-hee out of jealousy. Jin-sung's wish comes true and she gets the spot for the ballet school but her fellow students treat her coldly. The belief that Jin-sung is partially to blame for her former best friend's death continues to spread and So-hee's ghost begins to haunt her crush relentlessly.

Affected by the death of So-hee, the only person to have treated her with kindness, Hye-ju (who has become slim due to a wish fulfilled by the stairs at the price of suffering bulimia) attempts to keep So-hee's belongings as a reminder of her only friend, for which she is further bullied, especially by Han Yun-ji, a fellow sculpture student. In turmoil, Hye-ju climbs the steps and wishes for So-hee to come back which prompts So-hee to possess her and exact revenge on her tormentor and stab Yun-ji to death. Jin-sung encounters Hye-ju, who tries to convince her that she is So-hee which frightens Jin-sung into fleeing. The spirit of So-hee finally makes Hye-ju set fire to the basement to scare Jin-sung, but the agonized young sculptor perishes in the flame by accident, and So-hee's ghost is free from her body.

The night before Jin-sung's departure to the ballet school, she is repeatedly pursued by So-hee. Unable to endure the torment, she tries to climb the stairs again in order to wish So-hee away. Before she can reach the 29th step, So-hee appears and holds her in place so she can't move. Traumatized and upset, Jin-sung confesses that she did not hate her and simply wanted to accomplish something of her own and be happy. Believing that Jin-sung does not love her as much as she does, but still is very much in love, So-hee hugs Jin-sung hoping to scare and comfort her, but her embrace is so strong it busts part of Jin-sung's stomach, killing her. However, the wish then comes true, and So-hee vanishes.

Some time later, a new cello student moves into the dorm room that Jin-sung once occupied. A picture of Jin-sung and So-hee is still left behind in, in which So-hee's irises suddenly disappear, implying that she still remains.

== Cast ==
- Song Ji-hyo as Yun Jin-sung
- Park Han-byul as Kim So-hee
- Jo An as Eom Hye-ju
- Park Ji-yeon as Han Yun-ji
- Kong Sang-ah as Kyeong-jin
- Lee Se-yeon as Young-seon
- Hong Soo-ah as sculpture club member
- Lee Min-jung as dance double for Yun Jin-sung
- Kwak Ji-min as dance class junior
- Moon Jeong-hee as dance teacher

== Notes ==
The film itself seems to mirror the ballet Giselle, which the girls in the film are studying, as well as drawing upon the classic short story "The Monkey's Paw", with So-hee as Giselle, and Jin-sung as Albrecht. Unhappy with always having to play the "prince" to So-hee's princess, Jin-sung betrays So-hee, which in turn leads to So-hee being crippled and commits suicide after her friend Jin-sung confesses she has hated her all along. When So-hee's spirit is wished back, Jin-sung is haunted by So-hee's ghost, the love she once felt for her friend warped by Jin-sung's hurtful actions.

As in the two previous movies, this film has strong themes of friendship, betrayal, and the taboo of lesbian affairs in an all-girls school.

== Release ==
Wishing Stairs was released on August 1, 2003, and exceeded 680,000 nationwide audiences within three days of its release. By August 10, the second week of its release, it was announced that it had surpassed 1.3 million nationwide audiences. In the Philippines, the film was released by Cinema Service on February 11, 2004.

The film which was released in Singapore, has achieved $377,298 (USD) for 11 days from the 13th to the 23rd, setting up as the highest box office record in South Korea. Wishing Stairs has recorded an overseas export of $500,000 (USD) across 10 countries including Japan, Taiwan, and Thailand.
