= The Uninvited (2009 film) =

2009 film by Charles Guard, Thomas Guard

- Theatrical release poster
- Directed by: The Guard Brothers
- Screenplay by: Craig Rosenberg; Doug Miro; Carlo Bernard
- Based on: A Tale of Two Sisters by Kim Jee-woon
- Produced by: Walter F. Parkes; Laurie MacDonald; Roy Lee
- Starring: Emily Browning; Elizabeth Banks; Arielle Kebbel; David Strathairn
- Cinematography: Daniel Landin
- Edited by: Jim Page; Christian Wagner
- Music by: Christopher Young
- Production companies: Cold Spring Pictures; Vertigo Entertainment; The Montecito Picture Company; Parkes+MacDonald Productions; Goldcrest Pictures
- Distributed by: DreamWorks Pictures (through Paramount Pictures)
- Release dates: January 30, 2009 (United States/Canada); May 28, 2009 (Germany)
- Running time: 87 minutes
- Countries: United States; Canada; Germany
- Language: English
- Box office: $42.7 million

The Uninvited is a 2009 psychological horror film directed by the Guard Brothers and starring Emily Browning, Elizabeth Banks, Arielle Kebbel, and David Strathairn. It is a remake of the 2003 South Korean horror film A Tale of Two Sisters, which is in turn one of several film adaptations of the Korean folk tale Janghwa Hongryeon jeon. The film was released by Paramount Pictures in the United States and Canada on January 30, 2009 and in Germany on May 28, 2009, grossed $42.7 million, and received mixed-to-negative reviews from critics, with the Rotten Tomatoes' critical consensus stating that it "suffers from predictable plot twists", but called it "moody and reasonably involving". The film is an international co-production between the United States, Canada and Germany.

== Plot ==
Following a suicide attempt after her terminally ill mother died in a house fire, Anna Ivers is discharged from a psychiatric institution after ten months; she has no memory of the actual fire, though recurring nightmares from that night frequently plague her. Back at home, Anna reunites with her older sister Alex and learns their father Steven has a new girlfriend, Rachel Summers, who was their mother's live-in nurse.

Anna and Alex become convinced that Anna's nightmares are messages from their mother, telling them that Rachel murdered her so she could be with Steven. The girls remain angry at Steven for moving their mother into the boathouse when she got sick, her only way of calling for help being a bell that Rachel tied to her wrist. Anna meets up with her old boyfriend Matt, who tells her he saw what happened the night her mother died, but Rachel intervenes before he can explain further.

Anna goes with Rachel into town so Alex can look through Rachel's possessions and Anna can talk to Matt again. The two secretly plan to meet that night, but Matt fails to show up. Anna has a ghastly hallucination of him; the next morning, his dead body is pulled out of the water, his back broken. The police state he fell from his boat and drowned.

After the sisters are unable to find any record of Rachel with the State Nursing Association, they conclude she is actually Mildred Kemp, a nanny who killed the children she was caring for after she became obsessed with their widowed father. While Steven is away on business, the girls try to gather evidence against Rachel to show the police, but Rachel catches them and sedates Alex. Anna escapes and goes to the local police station, but they disbelieve her and eventually call Rachel to take her home.

Rachel sedates Anna and puts her to bed; Anna sees Alex in the doorway with a knife before passing out. When she wakes up, she finds that Alex has killed Rachel and thrown her body in a dumpster in their backyard. When Steven arrives home, Anna explains that Rachel tried to murder them and Alex saved them. Confused and panicked, Steven reveals that Alex died in the fire along with their mother. Anna looks down to find that the bloody knife is in her hand, then finally remembers what happened on the night of the fire. After catching Steven and Rachel having sex, she became enraged, filled a watering can from a gasoline tank in the boathouse, and carried it toward the house, intending to burn it down. However, she failed to close the faucet and it spilled a trail of gasoline that ignited when a lantern fell. Her mother was killed in the resulting explosion, as was Alex.

It is revealed that Anna has symptoms of both severe schizophrenia and dissociative identity disorder. Flashbacks reveal that Anna has been hallucinating Alex since she returned home from the institution, which is why no one else ever responded to Alex's presence or speech, only Anna's. She also remembers killing Matt at their planned meeting by letting him fall off a cliff and breaking his back after he revealed that he saw what she had done. She finally remembers killing Rachel, who was not a murderer, but a kind woman trying to make the family work, mistakenly perceiving her to be homicidal and callous.

The next morning as Anna is arrested for murder, the police question Steven, who reveals that Rachel's real name was Rachel Worshinsky; she changed her last name three years earlier to escape from her abusive ex-boyfriend. When Anna returns to the mental institution, she is welcomed back by the patient in the room across from hers, whose nameplate reveals she is the real Mildred Kemp.

== Cast ==
- Emily Browning as Anna Ivers
- Arielle Kebbel as Alex Ivers
- David Strathairn as Steven Ivers
- Maya Massar as Mrs. Ivers
- Elizabeth Banks as Rachel Summers
- Jesse Moss as Matt
- Kevin McNulty as Sheriff Emery
- Don S. Davis as Mr. Henson
- Heather Doerksen as Mildred Kemp
- Lex Burnham as Iris Wright
- Danny Bristol as Samuel Wright
- Matthew Bristol as David Wright
- Dean Paul Gibson as Dr. Silberling

== Development ==
In 2002, producers Walter F. Parkes and Laurie MacDonald produced the hit horror film The Ring, a remake of the Japanese film Ring. They subsequently produced the film's successful sequel The Ring Two in 2005. Since first starting this new cycle of Asian horror film adaptations, Parkes and MacDonald searched for a project they felt was as ingeniously conceived and executed as The Ring and finally found it when producer Roy Lee brought the Korean film A Tale of Two Sisters to their attention.

When A Tale of Two Sisters played in American theatres, directors Tom and Charlie Guard acquired the English language remake rights. The Guard Brothers had previously directed commercials and short films and wanted to expand into feature films.

In June 2006, DreamWorks announced that a deal had been set up for the American version of A Tale of Two Sisters. The new film was a presentation of DreamWorks and Cold Spring Pictures (Disturbia) and was produced by Parkes, MacDonald and Lee. The screenplay was written by Craig Rosenberg (After the Sunset, Lost), Doug Miro and Carlo Bernard (The Great Raid).

In early 2008, the film, whose working title had been A Tale of Two Sisters, was renamed to The Uninvited.

The film was released in North American theatres on 30 January 2009.

=== Shooting location ===
Although the film is set in Maine, it was shot in Vancouver, British Columbia. Most of the film was shot at one location, a waterfront property on British Columbia's Bowen Island, a short ferry ride west from mainland Vancouver.

Producer Walter F. Parkes said, of the shooting location:

Eighty percent of the story takes place at the house, so we couldn't make the movie without the right one. It couldn't have been more important. We scouted Louisiana, an environment which is both beautiful and slightly threatening. We had two houses which were terrible compromises, but both of them fell through. We had a difficult time finding anything that had both the connection to the story and the right logistical possibilities. But then we were lucky to find in Canada a place that seemed as if it had been built for our movie. It was perfectly evocative and suggestive of a family that is both welcoming and forbidding. The fact that the house was within 30 miles of Vancouver was a greater plus than the minus of having to get everyone on boats to get them over there; water taxis and ferries are a way of life up there. In fact, I don't remember ever having a more pleasant time on a location. Getting onto a boat and having a cup of coffee and then going up the little pier and the stairs we built, it focused us. We were isolated with one thing on our minds, which was making this movie. It was great.

It is reported that a two-storey boathouse in the film was built on the property overlooking the water just for several scenes. The cold water is rough and unappealing; it is a greenish-grey that crashes constantly and does not invite swimming.

=== Casting ===
Emily Browning was hired to portray the lead Anna Ivers. She had originally auditioned for the role of Alex. The film is rated PG-13 and is visually less gory and bloody than the original film. Elizabeth Banks plays the role of the stepmother, Rachel. Banks based her character Rachel on Rebecca De Mornay in The Hand That Rocks the Cradle. "It was very important to me that every line reading I gave could be interpreted two ways," says Banks of her role, "so that when you go back through the movie you can see that." David Strathairn plays the concerned father of the two girls. Arielle Kebbel plays Anna's older sister, Alex Ivers.

=== Music ===
The original score for the film was composed by Christopher Young, who recorded it with a 78-piece orchestra and 20-person choir. His score features a glass harmonica and the Yale Women's Slavic Chorus.

Sara Niemietz is the vocalist for the soundtrack and film score, having previously worked with Christopher Young in the same capacity on The Exorcism of Emily Rose (2005). Now an adult, she is an independent artist and cast-member of Postmodern Jukebox.

== Reception ==
=== Box office ===
On its opening day, the film grossed $4,335,000 and ranked #2 in the box office. It got $10,512,000 for its opening weekend, set on the third place, opened in 2,344 theaters with an average $4,485 per theatre. The film spent nine weeks in US cinemas, and finished with a total gross of $28,596,818. It did fairly moderately for a horror film in the US markets. The film was released on March 26, 2009, in Australia, and it opened at the fifth position, averaging $3,998 at 121 sites, for a gross of A$483,714. The second week it dipped 29%.

=== Critical response ===
On the review aggregator website Rotten Tomatoes, 31% of 128 critics' reviews are positive. The website's consensus reads: "The Uninvited is moody and reasonably involving but suffers from predictable plot twists." Metacritic, which uses a weighted average, assigned the film a score of 43 out of 100, based on 24 critics, indicating "mixed or average" reviews. In Yahoo! Movies Critical Response, the average professional critical rating was a C according to 11 reviews. Audiences surveyed by CinemaScore gave the film a grade B on scale of A to F.

Dennis Harvey of Variety wrote: "Weak even by the standard of uninspired recent Asian-horror remakes, The Uninvited is more likely to induce snickers and yawns than shudders and yelps." Kim Newman of Empire magazine gave it two out of five and called it a "slick remake.... with a new set of twists" but let down by a finale featuring "revelations you've seen far too often" and an underused role for Banks. Bloody Disgusting gave the film three out of five and noted Banks and Kebbel's fine performances but also criticised the ending, "which can be figured out within the first 20 minutes" and noting it as "perfectly acceptable as a major-studio horror film for the 13 – 17 crowd and is unlikely to insult or ruffle the feathers of any genre fan that wants to give it a go."

Roger Ebert gave it three out of four stars, with particular praise for Browning: "She makes an ideal heroine for a horror movie: innocent, troubled, haunted by nightmares, persecuted by a wicked stepmother, convinced her real mother was deliberately burned to death. She makes you fear for her, and that's half the battle." Ebert also had positive notes for the cinematography, the casting of Strathairn. He expressed surprise at the PG-13 rating and cited this film as evidence that MPAA rates films based on the absence of sex, nudity, or foul language, rather than the imagery it does contain that might actually be inappropriate for younger viewers. Claudia Puig of USA Today gave it a positive review and wrote: "Don't be too quick to turn down The Uninvited. A stylish horror thriller in the vein of 'The Ring,' it's well-acted, frightening, and handsomely produced."
