= Palisades Tartan =

Film distributor

Palisades Tartan Films
- Formerly: Metro Tartan Distribution; Tartan Films
- Company type: Subsidiary
- Industry: Film
- Founded: 1984; 42 years ago
- Founder: Hamish McAlpine; John Beasley
- Defunct: May 9, 2017; 9 years ago
- Fate: Dissolved
- Headquarters: United Kingdom; United States
- Products: Motion pictures
- Parent: Palisades Media Group
- Divisions: Palisades Tartan Films USA; Palisades Tartan Films Spotlight; Palisades Tartan Video (Labels: Palisades Tartan Asia Extreme, Palisades Tartan Terror, Palisades Tartan Grindhouse)

Palisades Tartan was a film distribution company with headquarters in both the United Kingdom and the United States. It was established by the Palisades Media Group following the collapse of Tartan Films in the summer of 2008. Palisades Tartan acquires and distributes films from Tartan Films' library.

== History ==
Tartan Films, established in 1984, was a UK-based film distributor. Founder Hamish McAlpine is credited with creating the term "Asia Extreme". It also owned the US-based Tartan USA and Tartan Video. It has distributed East Asian films under the brand Tartan Asia Extreme. Between 1992 and 2003, Tartan Films operated under the name Metro-Tartan Distribution before reverting to Tartan Films. More recently, it has released films of other origins, under its Tartan Terror brand. These films include Battle Royale, the Whispering Corridors series, A Tale of Two Sisters, The Last Horror Movie and Oldboy.

Tartan Films USA released various internationally acclaimed films for the US market, including Oldboy, Triad Election, The Page Turner, 12:08 East of Bucharest, Red Road, 9 Songs, The Death of Mr. Lazarescu, The Cave of the Yellow Dog, and Battle in Heaven. Tartan USA's DVD catalogue was released through Genius Products, which was 70% owned by The Weinstein Company.

In June 2008, Tartan went into administration, laid off its employees, and ceased operations. The US branch was shut a month earlier and its library of films was sold to Palisades Media Group. Shortly after the sale, a representative of the Bryanston Distributing Company made a seven-figure cash offer to buy the company’s film library, but the offer was rejected by Palisades Media.

== Releases ==
=== Palisades Tartan ===
On 28 September 2008 the newly named Palisades Tartan label released its first UK DVD title (cat. no. PAL001DVD), the film P2, directed by Franck Khalfoun. On 7 January 2009 Palisades Tartan released Silent Light in the United States theatrically; it was the first US theatrical release for the company.

=== Tartan Films ===
Prior to the take-over, Tartan had originally released all of its films, including its Asia Extreme and Tartan Terror labels on VHS. As DVD became more popular, the company chose to release solely in this format and deleted the VHS back catalogue. The Metro Tartan branch of the company dealt with theatrical distribution.
