= Whispering Corridors =

- Theatrical release poster
- Hangul: 여고괴담
- Hanja: 女高怪談
- RR: Yeogogoedam
- MR: Yŏgogoedam
- Directed by: Park Ki-hyung
- Written by: In Jung-ok; Park Ki-hyung
- Produced by: Lee Choon-yeon
- Starring: Choi Kang-hee; Kim Gyu-ri; Lee Mi-yeon; Yoon Ji-hye; Park Jin-hee
- Cinematography: Seo Jeong-min
- Edited by: Hahm Sung-won
- Music by: Park Jung-ho; Moon Seung-hyun
- Distributed by: Cinema Service
- Release date: May 30, 1998 (South Korea)
- Running time: 105 minutes
- Country: South Korea
- Language: Korean

Whispering Corridors (Korean: 여고괴담; RR: Yeogogoedam; lit. 'Ghost Story in a Girls' High') is a 1998 South Korean supernatural horror film directed and co-written by Park Ki-hyung. It was part of the explosion in South Korean cinema following the liberalization of censorship in the aftermath of the end of the country's military dictatorship. The film makes a social commentary on authoritarianism and conformity in the harsh South Korean education system.

This film is the first installment of the Whispering Corridors film series, and was followed by five sequels (Memento Mori, Wishing Stairs, Voice, A Blood Pledge and The Humming), though none of the sequels share a continuing plot or characters with each other.

== Plot ==
In an all-female high school in South Korea, the Jookran High School for Girls, a homeroom teacher Mrs. Park, nicknamed "Old Fox" due to her sadistic method of teaching, circles several points in the students' yearbooks and calls her new fellow teacher, (also her former student) Hur Eun-young, telling her that "Jin-ju, is definitely dead, but still attending school."

Moments later, she is strangled with a noose by an unknown figure, her body discovered by three new senior students: the talented, superstitious artist Lim Ji-oh; the timid outsider, Yoon Jae-yi; and the sullen, unpopular Kim Jung-sook. Their new replacement teacher is the cruel, abusive Mr. Oh, nicknamed "Mad Dog", who likes to give corporal punishments to his students, as well as harass the class' top student, Park So-young.

The discovery of Mrs. Park's body deeply impacts Ji-oh, so she creates a painting of the body, which earns her a horrible punishment by Mr. Oh. Seeing Ji-oh dispirited, Jae-yi, a former artist, agrees to teach her painting in the storage room, which is rumored to be haunted. Ji-oh discovers that So-young goes there to hide her smoking habit.

Eun-young suspects that Ji-oh may be a ghost, since she carries bells that Jin-ju, her best friend from high school, had given her, but Ji-oh tells her that they were given to her by Jae-yi. One night, Mr. Oh is terrorized by Jin-ju and stabbed to death. The next night, Ji-oh encounters Jung-sook and So-young bickering, ending with So-young storming out. Jung-sook commits suicide in a manner similar to Mrs. Park's: hanging herself by a noose.

So-young tearfully reveals to Eun-young that she used to be close to Jung-sook, but the teachers started comparing them and they drifted apart, with Jung-sook growing bitter and withdrawn. While painting, Ji-oh discovers a bust created by Eun-young for Jin-ju, as well as Mr. Oh's body. A flashback shows how Jin-ju died in the storeroom while trying to save the statue; as it fell, she tripped, and everything came crashing down, including the sculpting knives, which ultimately killed her.

Eun-young learns from the yearbooks that since then, Jin-ju has entered the school every three years, posing as false students. She is currently posing as Jae-yi. Eun-young is confronted by an enraged Jae-yi/Jin-ju. Before Jin-ju can kill her, Ji-oh arrives and pleads with her to end the bloodshed and rest in peace. Jin-ju says that all she wanted was to live a normal high school life and have someone who could love her fearlessly as Eun-young couldn't. Jin-ju disappears after Ji-oh and Eun-young promise that they will correct the misgivings and that they will never forget her. Blood appears to run down the walls while Eun-young and Ji-oh, exhausted, sit in the room, with Ji-oh resting her head in Eun-young's lap.

Eun-young and Ji-oh are still in the classroom the next day when they are observed by a student. The girl leaves upon seeing the two, but as she turns around, it is revealed that she is Jung-sook's ghost.

== Cast ==
- Choi Kang-hee (credited as Choi Se-yeon) as Yoon Jae-yi
- Kim Gyu-ri as Lim Ji-oh
- Lee Mi-yeon as Hur Eun-young
- Yoon Ji-hye as Kim Jung-sook
- Park Yong-soo
- Kim Yu-seok as Art teacher
- Shin Yi as Delinquent
- Park Jin-hee as Park So-young

== Production ==
With the rise of Korean film industry, a demand for commercially oriented films was made. Horror films were generally absent from South Korea throughout the 1980s and due to the genres low production costs, it led to independent companies such as Cine 2000 to work in the genre. Producer Oh Ki-min began developing the concept in the winter of 1997, at a time when horror films were considered commercially marginal in South Korea. After the project was rejected by more than ten production companies, Cine2000 president Lee Choon-yeon expressed interest, while Cinema Service head Kang Woo-suk agreed to invest after reading a treatment. Oh conceived the film as a combination of a school ghost story and a rebellious youth film. Whispering Corridors cost US$600,000 to make and was completed with only 28 set-ups.

== Release ==
Whispering Corridors was released on May 30, 1998, in South Korea. It was a surprise hit and commercial success in South Korea, where it ranked third in the highest grossing domestically produced films of the year. The film was only beaten by A Promise and The Letter. A Korean Film Council retrospective later reported that the film drew approximately 2.5 million admissions, making it the most commercially successful entry in the series. Its depiction of the education system also generated controversy; the Korea Teachers' Association complained to the production company over scenes depicting sexual harassment and excessive punishment by teachers.

== Legacy ==
The film was followed by five sequels: Memento Mori (1999), Wishing Stairs (2003), Voice (2005), A Blood Pledge (2009) and The Humming (2021).

In October 2015, it was announced that a Chinese-language remake of Whispering Corridors was in development and to be directed by Zhen Qin. Production is set to be handled by Beijing-based Beautiful Creative Force Culture Media, October Pictures' Seoul branch, and the original franchise's production house Cine2000. The film was set for a 2016 release.

In 2018, the Korean Film Archive held a retrospective marking the twentieth anniversary of the series.

In 2020, Peter Bradshaw of The Guardian ranked Whispering Corridors number 10 in a list of classics of modern South Korean cinema.

In 2024, the British Film Institute included it in its list of "10 great South Korean horror films", describing its surprise box-office success as having helped initiate the subsequent boom in South Korean horror cinema.
