= Voice (2005 film) =

- Theatrical poster
- Hangul: 여고괴담 4: 목소리
- RR: Yeogogoedam 4: moksori
- MR: Yŏgogoedam 4: moksori
- Directed by: Choi Ik-Hwan
- Written by: Choi Ik-Hwan
- Produced by: Lee Choon-Yeon; Lee Mi-Young
- Starring: Kim Ok-vin; Seo Ji-hye; Cha Ye-ryun; Kim Seo-hyung; Im Hyun-kyung; Jeon Ji-ae
- Cinematography: Kim Yong-Heung
- Edited by: Kim Sun-Min
- Music by: Lee Byung-Hoon; Jang Young-Gyu
- Production company: CJ Entertainment
- Distributed by: Cinema Service
- Release date: July 15, 2005
- Running time: 104 minutes
- Country: South Korea
- Language: Korean
- Box office: US$2.9 million

Voice (Korean: 여고괴담 4: 목소리; RR: Yeogogoedam 4: moksori; lit. 'Ghost Stories in a Girls' High 4: the Voice'), is a 2005 South Korean horror film, and the fourth installment of the Whispering Corridors film series. The film was the debut film for its three young actresses, as well as director Choi Ik-Hwan, who had served as an assistant director on the first film of the series.

It was screened at the 2006 San Francisco Korean American Film Festival.

== Plot ==
Young-eon, the top singer at an all-girls school, is murdered by a music sheet cutting her throat in the opening scene. The next day her ghost returns, but nobody can see or hear her spirit except her friend Seon-min, who can only hear her. The two attempt to find out what happened to Young-eon, as her memory is fractured. Seon-min speculates that the music teacher must have killed Young-eon. Young-eon begins to have flashbacks about her past and the time when she was murdered.

Seon-min befriends a strange and lonely girl at school named Cho-ah, who can hear the voices of the dead. Cho-ah decides to help the two. Meanwhile, the music teacher kills herself. Seon-min begins to doubt what Young-eon says about her past after Cho-ah tells her that ghosts only remember what they want to, meaning Young-eon's memory may be unreliable. Young-eon's body is found on top of the elevator.

Young-eon learns that if Seon-min forgets about her, nobody will be able to hear her, and she begins to have increasingly disturbing and bizarre flashbacks about her mother's suicide, which Young-eon carelessly encouraged her to go through with while lacking understanding of the consequences of her actions. She meets Hyo-jung, another ghost who she has conflicting memories about. It is revealed that Young-eon previously had a rivalry with Hyo-jung due to their similar voices, and that she began wishing their teacher was dead in order to cause Hyo-jung, who was in love with their teacher, to quit music. In an intense confrontation, Young-eon and Hyo-jung killed each other.

Seon-min, after learning this, thinks Young-eon should move on and be at peace but Young-eon is angered by her statement, since she wants nothing more than to live again. Young-eon flies into a rage, killing Cho-ah and taking over Seon-min's body. She then walks alongside Seon-min's mother, talking about how, as soon as she is old enough, she will learn to drive, replicating a conversation Young-eun had with her mother before her mother committed suicide.

A scene during the credits shows Cho-ah shouting in frustration, but as she is voiceless, no sound comes out.

== Cast ==
- Kim Ok-vin as Young-eun
- Seo Ji-hye as Seon-min
- Cha Ye-ryun as Cho-ah
- Kim Seo-hyung as Hee-yeon, the music teacher
- Im Hyun-kyung as Hyo-jung
- Jeon Ji-ae as Hwa-jung
- Yoon Young as Hye-sun
- Lee Eun as Mi-hee
- Sun Joo-yeon as Jin-young
- Won Ae-ri as Myung-sook
- Park Yoon-kyung as Eun-ha
- Kim Sung-tae as Homeroom teacher
- Han Chae-woo as Athletic teacher
- Kim Jung-young as Young-eun's mother
