= The Story of Jang-hwa and Hong-ryeon =

Dae Jang-hwa Hong-ryeon jeon
- Film poster
- Hangul: 대장화홍련전
- Hanja: 大薔花紅蓮傳
- RR: Dae Janghwa Hongryeon jeon
- MR: Tae Changhwa Hongnyŏn chŏn
- Directed by: Jeong Chang-hwa
- Written by: Choi Keum-dong
- Produced by: Lee Hwa-ryong
- Starring: Jo Mi-ryeong; Choi Nam-hyeon; Um Aing-ran
- Cinematography: Lee Mun-baek
- Edited by: Kim Hui-su
- Music by: Park Chun-seok
- Production company: Hwaseong Co.
- Release date: 29 March 1962 (South Korea)
- Running time: 115 minutes
- Country: South Korea
- Language: Korean

The Story of Jang-hwa and Hong-ryeon (Dae Jang-hwa Hong-ryeon jeon) is a 1962 South Korean film directed by Jeong Chang-hwa. The film is based on a Korean folklore story called Janghwa Hongryeon jeon. It is the second adaptation of the story by the same director, after his 1956 version.

== Cast ==
- Jo Mi-ryeong
- Choi Nam-hyeon (최남현)
- Um Aing-ran
