= Janghwa Hongryeon jeon (1956 film) =

The Story of Jang-hwa and Heung-ryeon
- Film poster
- Hangul: 장화홍련전
- Hanja: 薔花紅蓮傳
- RR: Janghwa Hongryeonjeon
- MR: Changhwa Hongnyŏnjŏn
- Directed by: Chung Chang-wha
- Written by: Kim Seong-min
- Produced by: Kim Kyeong-jun
- Starring: Lee Kyeong-hie; Seo Yeong-ran
- Cinematography: Kim Yeong-sun
- Edited by: Chung Chang-wha
- Music by: Jo Baek-bong
- Release date: 17 June 1956 (South Korea)
- Country: South Korea
- Language: Korean

Janghwa Hongryeonjeon (literally The Story of Janghwa and Hongryeon) is 1956 South Korean horror film directed by Chung Chang-wha. The film is based on a popular Korean fairy tale "Janghwa Hongryeon jeon", which has been adapted into film versions a number of times, including another version by the same director in 1962.

== Premise ==
Janghwa Hongreonjeon is film based on a popular Korean folk tale revolving around two sisters.

== Cast ==
- Lee Kyeong-hie
- Seo Yeong-ran
- Choo Sok-Yang
- Seok Geum-seong
- Seo Wol-yeong
