= Baseball in South Korea =

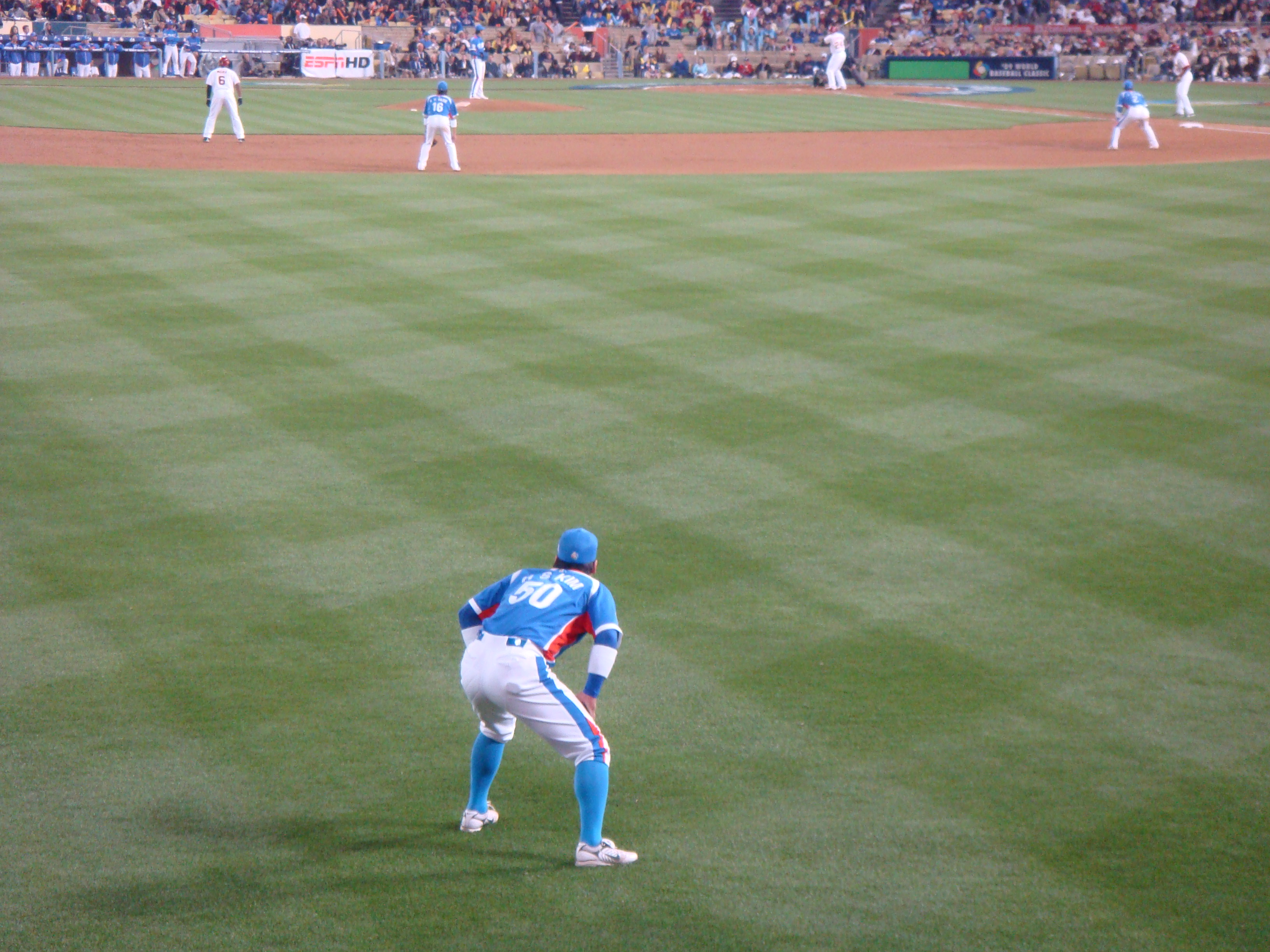
South Korean baseball player Kim Hyun-soo in the outfield during the 2009 World Baseball Classic

Baseball is believed to have been introduced to Korea in 1905 by North American missionaries during the Korean Empire era, after which it gradually attained prominence. After the division of the Korean Peninsula into North Korea and South Korea in 1948 and the further destabilization of the Korean War from 1950 to 1953, baseball has become one of the most popular sports in South Korea. North Korea, under isolationist leadership, does not have the same level of investment in baseball as South Korea. There are 10 professional teams in South Korea's KBO League. South Korean baseball season runs from March to October.

== History ==
=== Before the Korean war ===
American missionaries brought baseball to Korea in the 19th century. In 1896, U.S. Marines played exhibitions against teams of Americans expatriates and the Seoul Athletic Club. The sport flourished in the period of Japanese rule, though ethnic Koreans faced playing restrictions, as baseball was seen as a potential tool of Korean nationalism. During the Japanese occupation, Korean players were only allowed to play in tournaments sponsored by Japanese companies.

In December 1921, a team of American Major League players stopped in Seoul during a tour of Asia, and a Korean team was assembled to play against them. The Koreans were defeated, 23–3. Various Korean cities also participated in the Japanese intercity baseball tournament, from its inception in 1927 until 1942. In 1940 and 1942 Seoul won the tournament, defeating (respectively) the teams of Dalian and Osaka. At least one Korean played against a Babe Ruth-led team of American MLB all-stars which toured Japan in 1934.

=== Post-war period ===
The 1980s marked the beginning of the professional baseball era in South Korea. In 1982, the MBC Chungyong, Lotte Giants, Samsung Lions, OB Bears, Haitai Tigers, and Sammi Superstars were launched, as was the highest-level league that they composed, the Korea Baseball Championship. This league continues to be South Korea's major league, and has expanded to 10 teams.

The sport reached a new level of popularity when pitcher Chan Ho Park made his debut for the Los Angeles Dodgers in 1994. Park achieved a great deal of success in his Major League Baseball career, and paved the way for the American success of fellow South Korean players such as Hee-seop Choi, Byung-hyun Kim, Bong Jung-keun, Shin-Soo Choo, Hyun-jin Ryu, Jung-ho Kang, and Ha-seong Kim.

It is also played widely on the local high school and collegiate level, as well as in a farm league (the Korea Baseball Futures League).

Baseball's South Korean governing body is the Korea Baseball Organization, a member of the International Baseball Federation and the organization responsible for the nation's participation in such international competitions such as the Olympics, World Baseball Classic and the Asian Games. The KBO also manages Korea's national team.

South Korea rose to prominence on the international baseball scene in the mid-2000s, finishing second in the 2009 World Baseball Classic to its arch-rival Japan. The team won the bronze medal at the 2000 Summer Olympics in Sydney, Australia, and the gold medal against Cuba at the 2008 Summer Olympics in Beijing, China. At the end of the 2023 World Baseball Classic, South Korea ranked fifth in the WBSC World Rankings.

In March 2024, two regular-season Major League Baseball (MLB) games were played in Seoul, between the Los Angeles Dodgers and San Diego Padres; each team won one game.

== Attendances ==
In the 2025 league season, three baseball clubs from South Korea recorded an average home league attendance of at least 20,000:

#	Club	Average
1	Samsung Lions	22,312
2	LG Twins	22,260
3	Lotte Giants	20,301

== In popular culture ==
=== Films ===
- If the Sun Rises in the West
- YMCA Baseball Team: a semi-historical 2002 film about South Korea's first baseball team
- Mr. Gam's Victory
- Scout
- Glove: a 2011 film based on the true story of a fading baseball pro who is sent to coach baseball for deaf and hard of hearing children
- Pitch High
- Perfect Game: a 2011 film based on the true story of the rivalry between Sun Dong-yeol of the Haitai Tigers and Choi Dong-won of the Lotte Giants in the 1980s
- Mr. Go
- Baseball Girl
- Not Out

=== TV Drama ===
- Hot Stove League: a 2019 South Korean television series that received critical acclaim and won Best Drama at the 56th Baeksang Arts Awards. The story of two managers whose goal is to move their baseball team from the bottom of the league to the top.

=== Music ===
- NCT's 2021 album "Universe" features the title track "Universe (Let's Play Ball)", performed by the U subunit. It is inspired by the sport and the music video shows scenes of the group playing baseball.

== See also ==
=== Baseball organizations and leagues ===
- Korea Baseball Association
- Korea Baseball Organization
- KBO League
- Korea Baseball Futures League

=== Other related pages ===
- Baseball cheering culture in South Korea
- High school baseball in South Korea
- Pikki Pikki dance
- South Korea national baseball team
- South Korea women's national baseball team
