= Kim Hyun-seok (filmmaker) =

South Korean film director and screenwriter

- Born: June 7, 1972 (age 54); South Korea
- Education: Yonsei University; Chung-Ang University
- Occupations: Film director, screenwriter
- Years active: 1995-present

Korean name
- Hangul: 김현석
- RR: Gim Hyeonseok
- MR: Kim Hyŏnsŏk

Kim Hyun-seok (born June 7, 1972) is a South Korean film director and screenwriter. Kim wrote and directed YMCA Baseball Team (2002), When Romance Meets Destiny (2005), Scout (2007), Cyrano Agency (2010), and C'est Si Bon (2015). He also directed 11 A.M. (2013), and wrote If the Sun Rises in the West (1998) and Joint Security Area (2000).

== Career ==
Born in 1972, Kim Hyun-seok was a college student studying business administration at Yonsei University when he wrote the screenplay for A Good Day to Fall in Love. It was instantly turned into a 1995 film directed by Kwon Chil-in. His second screenplay Agency, written while Kim was doing his mandatory military service, won him Best New Screenwriter at the prestigious Grand Bell Awards, but it was never made into a film.

After that, Shim Jae-myung welcomed him to her production company Myung Films, and he wrote If the Sun Rises in the West (1998), which was directed by Lee Eun and starred Im Chang-jung and Ko So-young as a baseball umpire and an actress who fall in love. Kim also worked as assistant director on that film and Kim Ki-duk's The Isle (2000), as well as co-screenwriter on Park Chan-wook's Joint Security Area (2000).

Despite his screenwriting success, Kim wanted to pursue directing, so he majored in filmmaking at the Graduate School of Advanced Imaging Science, Multimedia & Film at Chung-Ang University. He then made his directorial debut in 2002 with YMCA Baseball Team starring Song Kang-ho, Kim Hye-soo, and Kim Joo-hyuk. About Korea's very first baseball team, which was formed in 1906 against the backdrop of Joseon's waning years and the onset of Japanese imperialism, it won the top prize at the 17th Fukuoka Asian Film Festival in Japan, and Kim won Best New Director at the Chunsa Film Art Awards in 2002 and the Baeksang Arts Awards in 2003.

In 2005, Kim wrote and directed his second film, When Romance Meets Destiny starring Kim Joo-hyuk, Bong Tae-gyu, Lee Yo-won and Kim Ah-joong. Titled "Gwang-sik's Younger Brother, Gwang-tae" in Korean, it focused on the romantic challenges of two brothers who are polar opposites: one is a photographer who's too shy to confess his feelings to the girl he's loved for seven years, and the other is a commitment-phobic playboy who finally meets his match. The film drew a solid 2.4 million admissions at the box office.

Kim returned to a period setting and baseball with Scout (2007), in which an assistant scout played by Im Chang-jung is sent to Gwangju in May 1980 (amidst the escalation of demonstrations against the dictatorial government) to convince a young pitching phenomenon named Sun Dong-yeol to sign with his team. Kim not only directed and wrote Scout, he was also the film's executive producer; it was also his third film related to baseball. The film was unsuccessful at the box office with 315,187 admissions, but critics praised how Kim ambitiously intertwined painful history and sports in his narrative, and he won Best Screenplay at the Baeksang Arts Awards and the Buil Film Awards in 2008.

He then reworked his old script Agency, changing almost everything in the first draft but the film's basic framework. Comparing the original draft to the final script, Kim said "(What) changed the most was that in my 20s I had a fantasy of love—like I believed if I lived well, then I could meet a beautiful woman. But years later, when I began the movie, my idea of love changed. It's not that you trust someone and therefore fall in love, but that you trust someone because you love them." Upon the suggestion of director Bae Chang-ho, Kim overtly referenced Cyrano de Bergerac into a contemporary Korean setting, as a struggling theatre troupe turned dating agency helps a dorky fund manager court the woman of his dreams, not knowing that she's the troupe director's ex-girlfriend. Starring Uhm Tae-woong, Choi Daniel and Lee Min-jung, Kim's fourth film Cyrano Agency became a critical and commercial success; a sleeper hit at 2.7 million admissions, it further cemented his reputation for making intelligent, character-driven romantic comedies told from a male perspective. Kim won Best Screenplay at the Blue Dragon Film Awards.

Kim tackled a new genre in 2013, with the science fiction-psychological thriller 11 A.M.. It starred Jung Jae-young and Kim Ok-bin as scientists who time travel 24 hours into the future as a test run of the time machine they've developed, but find to their horror that in that intervening time, the CCTV files reveal chaos and dead colleagues in their deep-sea laboratory. Kim said he had no idea how much energy and expense went into a single action sequence, calling the experience "daunting" and that he now "understood (why) Korean filmmakers have steered clear of the genre." Instead of trying to understand the science and philosophy behind time travel, he said he focused instead on depicting the characters' emotional truths. 11 A.M. was Kim's first directorial effort where he didn't use his own script, and the film received mixed reviews.

Following 11 A.M.'s less than positive reception, Kim returned to more familiar terrain with C'est Si Bon in 2015. A biopic of the folk music duo Twin Folio set in the eponymous iconic music lounge where acoustic singers performed live, the screenplay added a third fictional member who falls for the group's muse (played by Jung Woo and Han Hyo-joo in the 1970s, and by Kim Yoon-seok and Kim Hee-ae 30 years later). Kim said, "When writing the script, I considered their music as the protagonists and just used some parts of their lives as the film's basis." Despite a rich soundtrack and visuals, C'est Si Bon failed to amass word of mouth and had a lackluster theatrical run.

== Filmography ==
- A Good Day to Fall in Love (1995) - screenwriter
- If the Sun Rises in the West (1998) - screenwriter, assistant director
- The Isle (2000) - assistant director
- Joint Security Area (2000) - screenwriter
- YMCA Baseball Team (2002) - director, screenwriter
- Mr. Gam's Victory (2004) - cameo
- When Romance Meets Destiny (2005) - director, screenwriter
- Scout (2007) - director, screenwriter, executive producer
- Cyrano Agency (2010) - director, screenwriter
- 11 A.M. (2012) - director, script editor
- INGtoogi: The Battle of Internet Trolls (2013) - producer
- C'est Si Bon (2015) - director, screenwriter
- I Can Speak (2017) - director

== Awards ==
- 1995 33rd Grand Bell Awards: Best New Screenwriter (Agency)
- 2002 10th Chunsa Film Art Awards: Best New Director (YMCA Baseball Team)
- 2003 39th Baeksang Arts Awards: Best New Director (YMCA Baseball Team)
- 2008 44th Baeksang Arts Awards : Best Screenplay (Scout)
- 2008 17th Buil Film Awards : Best Screenplay (Scout)
- 2010 31st Blue Dragon Film Awards : Best Screenplay (Cyrano Agency)
- 2010 6th University Film Festival of Korea: Best Screenplay (Cyrano Agency)
- 2017 38th Blue Dragon Film Awards: Best Director (I Can Speak)
