= Kim Hyun-seok =

Kim Hyun-seok (김현석) may refer to:

- Kim Hyun-seok (footballer) (born 1967), South Korean footballer
- Kim Hyun-seok (filmmaker) (born 1972), South Korean filmmaker
