= C'est si bon (film) =

C'est Si Bon
- Theatrical release poster
- Directed by: Kim Hyun-seok
- Written by: Kim Hyun-seok
- Produced by: Kang Myeong-chan; Lee Woo-jung
- Starring: Kim Yoon-seok; Jung Woo; Kim Hee-ae; Han Hyo-joo; Jang Hyun-sung; Jin Goo; Kang Ha-neul
- Cinematography: Lee Mo-gae
- Edited by: Kim Sang-bum; Kim Jae-bum
- Music by: Lee Byung-hoon
- Production company: Nogunri Pictures
- Distributed by: CJ Entertainment
- Release date: February 5, 2015 (South Korea)
- Running time: 122 minutes
- Country: South Korea
- Language: Korean
- Budget: US$5.5 million
- Box office: US$11.8 million

C'est si bon (Korean: 쎄시봉; RR: Ssesibong) is a 2015 South Korean musical drama film written and directed by Kim Hyun-seok. It was released on February 5, 2015.

C'est si bon (French for "It's so good") was an acoustic music lounge located in Mugyo-dong, Seoul. During the 1960s and 1970s, the venue was very popular with Koreans in their twenties and thirties, who went there to listen to live music. Among the bands known for having played there was the folk music duo Twin Folio composed of Yoon Hyung-joo and Song Chang-sik; this film depicts the band's beginnings while including a fictional third member, Oh Geun-tae.

== Plot ==
In the late 1960s, C'est si bon is the music lounge every unknown acoustic band dreams of playing. It is where Geun-tae, a naïve country boy, meets musical prodigies and rivals Hyung-joo and Chang-sik. Together they form a band and name themselves after the iconic venue — the C'est si bon Trio. As the three young musicians bicker over their music, beautiful socialite Ja-young enters the picture and becomes their muse, launching a series of moving love songs. Ja-young falls for the pure-hearted Geun-tae, but they part ways when she accepts a once-in-lifetime shot at an acting career. 20 years later in the 1990s, Geun-tae and Ja-young meet again.

== Cast ==
=== Main ===
- Kim Yoon-seok as Oh Geun-tae (40s)
  - Jung Woo as Oh Geun-tae (20s)
- Kim Hee-ae as Min Ja-young (40s)
  - Han Hyo-joo as Min Ja-young (20s)
- Jang Hyun-sung as Lee Jang-hee (40s)
  - Jin Goo as Lee Jang-hee (20s)

=== Supporting ===
- Kang Ha-neul as Yoon Hyung-joo
- Jo Bok-rae as Song Chang-sik
- Kwon Hae-hyo as Kim Choon-sik
- Choi Kyu-hwan as Teacher Lee
- Lee Mi-so as Ran
- Lee Ji-hoon as MC Lee
- Park Sung-eun as Guk ("Soup")
- Moon Ji-in as Juk ("Porridge")
- Lee Dae-yeon as Geun-tae's father
- Kim Mi-kyung as Geun-tae's mother
- Oh Ha-nee as High School girl
- Jung Yeon-joo as Wardrobe actress
- Ahn Jae-hong as Byeong-cheol
- Lee Yong-yi as Geun-tae's aunt
- Jo Wan-gi as Jae-pil
- Jang Ji-in as Mi-ran
- Lee Sang-hee as Writer Yeo
- Kim In-kwon as Jo Young-nam (cameo)
- Kim Jae-wook as Kang Myeong-chan (cameo)

== Reception ==
C'est si bon was released in South Korea on February 5, 2015. It topped the box office on its opening weekend, with 642,000 admissions and ₩5.14 billion (US$4.63 million) gross over four days, but it quickly dropped down the chart in the following weeks, eventually grossing a lackluster ₩13,556,519,358 (US$11.5 million) from 1,715,370 admissions (halfway its break-even point of 3 million admissions).

== Awards and nominations ==
Year	Award	Category	Recipient	Result
2015	20th Chunsa Film Art Awards	Best Screenplay	Kim Hyun-seok	Nominated
2015	51st Paeksang Arts Awards	Best New Actor	Jo Bok-rae	Nominated
2015	19th Bucheon International Fantastic Film Festival	Fantasia Award	Jung Woo	Won
2015	24th Buil Film Awards	Best Music	Lee Byung-hoon	Nominated
2015	52nd Grand Bell Awards	Best Supporting Actor	Jin Goo	Nominated
2015	52nd Grand Bell Awards	Best Music	Lee Byung-hoon	Nominated
