= Lee Dae-yeon =

South Korean actor

- Born: November 13, 1964 (age 61); Jecheon, North Chungcheong Province, South Korea
- Occupation: Actor
- Agent: JR Entertainment

Korean name
- Hangul: 이대연
- Hanja: 李大淵
- RR: I Daeyeon
- MR: I Taeyŏn

Lee Dae-yeon (born November 13, 1964) is a South Korean actor.

== Filmography ==
=== Film ===
Year	Title	Role
1996	The River Flows To Tomorrow	
1997	Poison	
1999	The Harmonium in My Memory	
2000	Peppermint Candy	President Kang/Detective Kang
2000	Joint Security Area	
2001	Hi! Dharma!	Chang-guen
2001	The Last Witness	
2002	Bad Guy	
2002	L'Abri (Bus Stop)	
2002	Sympathy for Mr. Vengeance	Choi
2002	Camel(s)	
2002	YMCA Baseball Team	
2003	My Teacher, Mr. Kim	
2003	A Tale of Two Sisters	Bae Su-mi's doctor
2003	Oldboy	Beggar
2004	Arahan	
2004	Three... Extremes - segment: "Cut"	
2004	DMZ	
2005	Red Eye	Professor Kim
2005	This Charming Girl	Uncle
2005	Innocent Steps	
2005	Rules of Dating	Teacher Jo
2005	Lady Vengeance	Parent of abducted child
2005	Princess Aurora	Chief detective
2005	When Romance Meets Destiny	Doctor
2007	The Show Must Go On	Company president Baek
2007	Paradise Murdered	Captain Kim
2007	Texture of Skin	
2007	Mission Possible: Kidnapping Granny K	
2007	Scout	Baek Boo-jang
2008	Lovers of Six Years	Lee Da-jin's doctor
2008	Out of My Intention (short film)	Middle-aged man
2009	Boat	Bo-kyeong
2009	Paju	Pastor
2009	Triangle	Section Chief Kim
2010	A Little Pond	Jiang's uncle
2010	Cyrano Agency	Pastor
2011	Battlefield Heroes	Tang Dynasty, Yi Juk
2011	A Confession	In Kang-han
2011	The Last Blossom	Dr. Jang
2012	Dancing Queen	Pil-je
2013	South Bound	Public safety top line
2013	Dead End	Hong Gook-jang
2013	11 A.M.	Chief Jo
2013	Geochang Massacre - Bloody Winter	
2014	The Pirates	Yi Seong-gye
2015	C'est si bon	Oh Geun-tae's father
2015	Coin Locker Girl	Dr. Ahn
2015	Alice in Earnestland	Chief
2015	The Throne	Kim Sang-ro
2016	Pure Love	Soo-ok's father
2016	Horror Stories 3 - segment: "Road Rage"	Truck man
2017	I Can Speak	Borough chief
2023	Dream Palace	

=== Television series ===
Year	Title	Role	Notes	Ref.
2003	Snowman	Detective Kim		
2003	Good Person	Father Choi		
2004	Drama City: Anagram		one act-drama	
2004	Magic	Yang Byung-soo		
2004	Ireland	Noh Dong-seok		
2005	My Love Toram	Kim Il-bong		
2005	18 vs. 29	Choi Ki-ja		
2005	Resurrection	Gyung Gi-do		
2005	Shin Don	Ki-chul		
2006	Famous Princesses	Goo Soo-han		
2006	Finding Dorothy	Captain Pyo		
2007	Eight Days, Assassination Attempts against King Jeongjo	Mun Inbang		
2008	The Great King, Sejong	Choi Hae-san		
2008	Spotlight	Go Byung-chun		
2008	Hometown Legends: Demon's Story	Lee Dae-gam		
2009	The Road Home	Park Chil-nam		
2009	Cinderella Man		Cameo	
2010	The Slave Hunters	Bhikkhu Myung-ahn		
2010	Oh! My Lady	Eom Dae-yong		
2010	KBS Drama Special: Spy Trader Kim Chul-soo's Recent Condition	Yoon Dong-hwa	one act-drama	
2011	My Princess	So Sun-woo		
2011	Drama Special Series: Perfect Spy	Jung Kyu-yong	one act-drama	
2011	The Princess' Man	Kwon Ram		
2012	Man from the Equator	Kim Kyung-pil		
2012	I Do, I Do	President Yeom		
2012	Jeon Woo-chi	Policeman Moon		
2013	Flower Boys Next Door	Hong Soon-chul		
2013	Ad Genius Lee Tae-baek	President Choi		
2013	KBS TV Novel: Eunhui	Kim Hyung-man		
2013	The Blade and Petal	Do-soo		
2013	Medical Top Team	Hwang Cheol-goo		
2013	KBS Drama Special: The Devil Rider	Kang Gae	one act-drama	
2013	Golden Rainbow	Kim Jae-soo		
2014	Beyond the Clouds	Jung Do-joon		
2014	Three Days	Han Ki-joon		
2014	Golden Cross	Kang Joo-wan		
2014	Big Man	Kim Han-doo		
2014	Run, Jang-mi	Jang Myung-moon		
2014	KBS Drama Special: The Tale of the Bookworm	Lee Yi-chum	one act-drama	
2015	Spy	Jung Kyu-yong		
2015	Thank You, My Son	Jang Hyung-san		
2015	Who Are You: School 2015	Han Ki-choon		
2015	Oh My Ghost	Shin Myung-ho		
2015	Splash Splash Love	Choe Man-ri		
2016	Goodbye Mr. Black	Min Yong-jae		
2016	Love in the Moonlight	Jo Man-hyeong		
2016	Blow Breeze	Lee Kyung-shik		
2017	KBS TV Novel: A Sea of Her Own	Yoon Dong-chul		
2017	The Liar and His Lover		Cameo	
2017	Live Up to Your Name	Professor Hwang		
2017	Revolutionary Love	Jang Se-man		
2017	Two Cops	Yoo Jung-man		
2018	Lawless Lawyer	Woo Hyung-man		
2018	About Time	Husband	Cameo (episode 1)	
2018	Let Me Introduce Her	Han Young-cheol		
2019	Item	Shin Goo-cheol		
2019	Abyss	Seo Cheon-shik		
2019	Justice	Kang Il-man	Cameo	
2019	Hot Stove League	Kim Jong-moo		
2020	Hi Bye, Mama!	Kim Pan-seok	Cameo (episode 7 & 9)	
2020	Fatal Promise	Cha Man-jong		
2022	Through the Darkness	Baek Jun-sik		
2022	Bravo, My Life	Jang Hyun-seok		
2023–2024	Bumpy Family	Kang Ki-seok		

=== Web series ===
Year	Title	Role	Ref.
2017	The Universe's Star	Woo-joo's father	

== Theater ==
Year	Title	Role	Ref.
2022–2023	Miners Painters	Robert Ryan	

== Awards and nominations ==
Name of the award ceremony, year presented, category, nominee of the award, and the result of the nomination
Award ceremony	Year	Category	Nominee / Work	Result	Ref.
SBS Drama Awards	2022	Best Supporting Team	Through the Darkness	Nominated	
