= Korea Baseball Softball Association =

Governing body of amateur and international baseball in South Korea

- Abbreviation: KBA
- Formation: 1946
- Type: Sport governing body
- Legal status: Active
- Purpose: managing all of aspects except the professional
- Headquarters: Gangnam, Seoul, South Korea
- Region served: Domestic
- Members: Baseball Federation of Asia, International Baseball Federation
- Official language: Korean
- Chancellor: Kang Seung-kyoo
- Website: http://www.korea-baseball.com

- Korea Baseball Softball Association
- Hangul: 대한야구소프트볼협회
- Hanja: 大韓野球소프트볼協會
- Revised Romanization: Daehan Yagu Sopeuteubol Hyeophoe
- McCune–Reischauer: Taehan Yagu Sop'ŭt'ŭbol Hyŏphoe

The Korea Baseball Softball Association (KBSA; Korean: 대한야구소프트볼협회) is the governing body of baseball in South Korea. KBA was founded in 1946 as Joseon Baseball Association (Korean: 조선야구협회), and renamed in 1954. KBA has been charged with the task of promoting and spreading organised baseball. It is one of two major baseball governing bodies, and the other is Korea Baseball Organization (Korean: 한국야구위원회; KBO). KBA is not confused with KBO, which has been governing professional leagues from 1982. Since Korea Professional Baseball began, KBA has governed the domestic amateur competitions and the national teams for the international competitions except World Baseball Classic (WBC), Asia Series for professional. Besides, the Women's Baseball Association Korea (Korean: 한국여자야구연맹; WBAK) is in charge of women's baseball in South Korea.

== See also ==
- Baseball in Korea
- Korea Baseball Organization (KBO)
- International Baseball Federation (IBAF)
- Baseball Federation of Japan
- Australian Baseball Federation
- Baseball Federation of Asia
- Baseball Confederation of Oceania
- Confederation of European Baseball
- Pan American Baseball Confederation
