= Park Chul-min =

South Korean actor (born 1967)

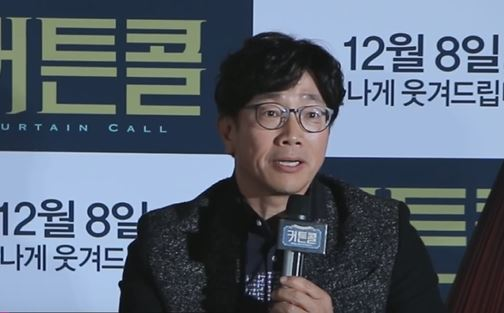
- Park at the press conference of the film Curtain Call
- Born: January 18, 1967 (age 59); Gwangju, South Korea
- Education: Chung-Ang University - Business Administration
- Occupation: Actor
- Years active: 1988–present

Korean name
- Hangul: 박철민
- Hanja: 朴哲民
- RR: Bak Cheolmin
- MR: Pak Ch'ŏlmin

Park Chul-min (Korean: 박철민; born January 18, 1967) is a South Korean actor.

== Career ==
Park Chul-min began acting in his high school drama club at Chosun University High School, and though he majored in Business Administration at Chung-Ang University, he spent majority of his college years in theater circles. After graduating in 1988, Park joined the professional theater troupe Hyunjang (현장), and for 5 to 6 years he appeared in plays on Daehakro such as A Story of Old Thieves (늘근도둑 이야기) and Kim Cheol-sik of the Republic of Korea (대한민국 김철식).

After several years of doing bit parts onscreen, Park gained attention in 2004 for his roles in the film Mokpo, Gangster's Paradise and the period drama Immortal Admiral Yi Sun-sin. Since then, he has become one of the most prolific supporting actors in Korean cinema, most often cast in physical, comic performances in films such as Gwangju massacre drama May 18 (2007), romantic comedy Cyrano Agency (2010), monster movie Sector 7 (2011), and comedy satire Almost Che (2012).

In 2014, Park starred in his first major leading role in Another Promise (formerly titled Another Family), the first 100%-crowdfunded Korean film based on the real-life story of Hwang Sang-ki, a Gangwon Province-based cab driver and his legal battle to win compensation for his daughter Yu-mi's death from leukemia in 2007 at age 23, which he believes was contracted when she worked for four years at a Samsung semiconductor factory. Despite little media attention on the case, the Seoul High Court ruled in Hwang's favor in 2011; the ruling was the first case in which an individual won a suit against a Korean conglomerate.

== Filmography ==
=== Film ===
Year	Title	Role	Ref.
1995	A Single Spark		
1996	A Petal		
1996	The Adventures of Mrs. Park		
1997	Downfall		
1998	First Kiss		
1999	The Uprising		
1999	A Gangster Forever (short film)		
2000	Chunhyang		
2000	Just Do It!		
2000	A Masterpiece in My Life	Jin-won	
2001	Bungee Jumping of Their Own		
2001	Kilimanjaro		
2001	Kick the Moon		
2001	Kiss Me Much		
2002	Looking for Bruce Lee		
2002	Chi-hwa-seon		
2002	Make It Big		
2002	Enjoy Your Summer (short film)		
2003	I'm OK		
2003	Show Show Show		
2003	The Road Taken		
2004	Mokpo, Gangster's Paradise		
2004	Father and Son: The Story of Mencius	(cameo)	
2004	Love, So Divine	Innkeeper	
2004	Rikidōzan		
2005	This Charming Girl		
2005	Blood Rain	Jo Dal-ryung	
2005	Mr. Socrates	Baek Chang-gyu	
2005	When Romance Meets Destiny	bartender	
2006	The Customer Is Always Right	supermarket owner	
2006	See You After School	homeroom teacher	
2006	The Fox Family	Detective	
2006	Traces of Love	Detective Park	
2006	Hot for Teacher	Ahn Do-min	
2007	Master KIMs	Second Child	
2007	Mr. Lee vs. Mr. Lee	son-in-law	
2007	May 18	In-bong	
2007	Scout	Seo Gon-tae	
2008	My New Partner	Jang Byung-sam	
2008	Oishii Man	(cameo)	
2009	My Father	homeroom teacher	
2009	Kwang-tae's Basic Story (short film)		
2009	4th Period Mystery	Crazy	
2009	Kill Me	Lee Man-soo	
2010	Cyrano Agency	Chul-bin	
2010	In Between		
2011	Meet the In-Laws	Dae-sik	
2011	The Suicide Forecast	Dept. head Oh	
2011	Leafie, A Hen into the Wild	Dal-soo (voice)	
2011	Sector 7	Do Sang-gu	
2011	Pitch High	Chae Moon	
2011	Always	Coach Bang	
2011	Mr. Idol	(cameo)	
2011	Spellbound	Pil-dong	
2011	Marrying the Mafia 4: Unstoppable Family		
2012	As One	Coach Lee	
2012	The Concubine	medicine eunuch	
2012	Almost Che	Hwang Bi-hong	
2012	Love Clinique	Director Mok	
2012	The Tower	Chef	
2012	In Between	Song Jang-soo (segment "Mineral Water")	
2013	Fish Out of Water (short film)		
2013	Montage		
2013	Weird Business	segment "The Witch"	
2013	The Hero	Young-tak	
2013	No Breathing	Jae-suk	
2013	11 A.M.	Young-sik	
2013	Steal My Heart	(cameo)	
2014	Another Promise	Han Sang-gu	
2014	Monster	Boss Park (cameo)	
2014	The Pirates	Monk (bandit)	
2015	Clown of a Salesman	Chul-joong	
2015	Perfect Proposal	Yacht Captain	
2015	Minority Opinion	(cameo)	
2015	The Summer in Ibaraki	(documentary narration)	
2015	Bad Guys Always Die		
2015	The Magician	Ki-tak	
2015	The Unfair	Judge Kim Joon-bae	
2016	Hiya	Choi Dong-pal	
2016	Operation Chromite	Nam Ki-sung	
2016	Yongsoon	Chief of school administration	
2016	A Break Alone		
2016	Split	Park Yoon-bae (cameo)	
2016	Curtain Call	Chul-goo	
2017	New Trial	Detective Hwang	
2017	The Villainess	Sook-hee's father	
2017	I Can Speak	Manager Yang	
2017	The Preparation	Section Chief Park	
2017	The Age of Blood		
2018	Brothers in Heaven	Kang-gu	
2018	The Underdog		
2018	Too Hot to Die	Ma Kwang-ki	
2018	Revenger	Yi-pa	
2019	Inseparable Bros	Public Official Song	
2019	Aewol: Written on the Wind		
2020	Mr. Zoo: The Missing VIP	(cameo)	
2020	Innocence	Hwang Bang-young	
2021	Sweet & Sour		
2021	Taeil	Animated Film	
2025	Teaching Practice: Idiot Girls and School Ghost 2	The Principal	

=== Television series ===
Year	Title	Role	Notes	Ref.
2004	Say You Love Me			
2004	Sunlight Pours Down			
2004	Immortal Admiral Yi Sun-sin			
2005	Spring Day	Lee Jin-tae		
2005	Princess Lulu	Chauffeur Moon		
2005	Can Love Be Refilled?			
2006	Wolf			
2006	Drama City: "Scrubber No. 3"			
2006	Drama City: "Blockhead's Quadratic Equation"			
2007	Drama City: "A Death Messenger with Amnesia"			
2007	Crazy in Love			
2007	Conspiracy in the Court	Public officer		
2007	Ground Zero			
2007	New Heart	Bae Dae-ro		
2008	Night After Night			
2008	Beethoven Virus			
2009	The Return of Iljimae	Wang Hoeng-bo		
2009	Partner	Byeon Hang-ro		
2009	Heading to the Ground			
2009	Temptation of an Angel		Cameo	
2010	The Woman Who Still Wants to Marry		Cameo	
2010	Golden House			
2010	Becoming a Billionaire			
2010	Athena: Goddess of War	handcuffed man		
2010	Sungkyunkwan Scandal			
2011	Warrior Baek Dong-soo			
2011	Baby Faced Beauty	Sun-nam	Cameo	
2012	Dummy Mommy	Kim Dae-young		
2013	Hur Jun, The Original Story	Koo Il-seo		
2014	Inspiring Generation	Old Man Fly		
2014	KBS Drama Special: "You're Pretty, Oh Man-bok"	Oh Dal-seong		
2014	Hotel King	Jang Ho-il		
2014	KBS Drama Special: "Repulsive Love"	Team Leader Kim		
2015	More Than a Maid	Heo Eung-cham		
2015	Bubble Gum	Kim Joon-hyuk		
2015	Imaginary Cat	Team Leader Ma		
2016	Secret Healer	merchant		
2016	The Good Wife			
2016	Love in the Moonlight	Kim Ui-gyo		
2017	The Emperor: Owner of the Mask	Woo Bo		
2017	The Idolmaster KR	Shim Min-chul		
2017	School 2017	Park Myung-deok		
2017	Ugly Miss Young-ae		Cameo	
2017	Revolutionary Love	CEO	Cameo	
2018	The Sound of Your Heart Reboot	Ae-bong's father		
2018–2019	Secrets and Lies	Yoon Chang-soo		
2019	He Is Psychometric	Nam Dae-nam		
2019	Graceful Family	Kim Boo-ki		
2019	The Tale of Nokdu	Park Jong-chil		
2020	Nobody Knows	Han Geun-man		
2020	Backstreet Rookie	fortune teller	Cameo (Ep.9)	
2020–2021	No Matter What	Han Eok-shim		
2021	Hello, Me!	Young-goo		
2021	So I Married the Anti-fan	Lee Joo-il		
2021	Youth of May	Choi Byeong-gil		
2022	Ghost Doctor	Ban Tae-sik		
2022	Again My Life	Kim Chan-sung		
2022	The Killer's Shopping List	Ah-hee's father	Cameo (Ep.1)	
2022	Love in Contract	Senior manager		
2022	Gaus Electronics	Cha Na-rae's father	Cameo (Ep.11-12)	
2022	Mental Coach Jegal	Jeon Chang-gil		
2023	Doctor Cha	Yoon Tae-sik		
2024	The Brave Yong Su-jeong	Yong Soo-jung		
2024	My Sweet Mobster	Section Chief Oh		
2025	Good Boy	Kim Geum-nam		

=== Television shows ===
Year	Title	Role	Ref.
2010	Film Culture Magazine VIP	Cast member	
2013	Talk Club Actors	Cast member	
2017	Law of the Jungle in New Zealand	Cast member	

== Theater ==
Year	Title	Ref.
	Kim Cheol-sik of the Republic of Korea (대한민국 김철식)	
2005	Stones in His Pockets	
2007	Kyung-sook, Kyung-sook's Father (경숙이, 경숙 아버지)	
2008–2010	A Story of Old Thieves (늘근도둑 이야기)	
2014–2015	A Story of Old Thieves (늘근도둑 이야기)	
2010	The Most Beautiful Goodbye in the World (세상에서 가장 아름다운 이별)	
2013–2014	Thursday Romance (그와 그녀의 목요일)	

== Awards ==
- 2010 6th University Film Festival of Korea: Best Supporting Actor (Cyrano Agency)
- 2009 5th Golden Ticket Awards: Best Actor in a Play (A Story of Old Thieves)
- 2008 MBC Drama Awards: Golden Acting Award, Supporting Actor (New Heart)
- 2008 5th Max Movie Awards: Best Supporting Actor (May 18)
- 2005 KBS Drama Awards: Best Supporting Actor (Immortal Admiral Yi Sun-sin)
