= Cyrano Agency =

- Promotional poster for Cyrano Agency
- Hangul: 시라노; 연애조작단
- Hanja: 시라노; 戀愛操作團
- RR: Sirano; yeonae jojakdan
- MR: Sirano; yŏnae chojaktan
- Directed by: Kim Hyun-seok
- Written by: Kim Hyun-seok
- Produced by: Shim Jae-myeong
- Starring: Uhm Tae-woong; Park Shin-hye; Choi Daniel; Park Chul-min; Lee Min-jung
- Cinematography: Kim Woo-hyung
- Edited by: Kim Sang-bum; Kim Jae-bum
- Music by: Kim Tae-seong
- Production company: Myung Films
- Distributed by: Lotte Entertainment
- Release date: 16 September 2010 (South Korea)
- Running time: 121 minutes
- Country: South Korea
- Language: Korean
- Box office: US$17.9 million

Cyrano Agency (Korean: 시라노; 연애조작단; lit. 'Cyrano Dating Agency') is a 2010 South Korean romantic comedy starring Uhm Tae-woong, Park Shin-hye, Choi Daniel, Park Chul-min and Lee Min-jung . It is a modern take on Edmond Rostand's 1897 play Cyrano de Bergerac, which focuses on a dating agency that helps its customers win the hearts of the people they desire. Produced by Myung Films and distributed by Lotte Entertainment, the film was released on September 16, 2010, and ran for 121 minutes. The film was later remade into the Tamil-language as Idhu Enna Maayam.

== Plot ==
Lovelorn Kim Hyeon-gon (Song Sae-byeok), who has fallen for coffee shop worker Seon-ah (Ryu Hyun-kyung), learns about Cyrano Agency, a small organization set up by theatre actor Lee Byeong-hoon (Uhm Tae-woong) that claims 100% success in making people fall in love. Kim signs on, and the Cyrano team — Byeong-hoon's one-time drama student Min-yeong (Park Shin-hye), plus older Cheol-bin (Park Chul-min) and younger Jae-pil (Jeon Ah-min) — set to work, constructing elaborate scenarios in which Seon-ah is the unwitting target and feeding lines to Hyeon-gon through an earpiece. The operation is a success, but Cyrano Agency needs more clients as its finances are perilous. Their next client is fund manager Lee Sang-yong (Choi Daniel), who has fallen for Kim Hee-joong (Lee Min-jung), a young woman he met at church. Byeong-hoon is not keen on taking the case, as it turns out that Hee-joong is an ex-girlfriend of him. Unwillingly he agrees, and things initially go smoothly between Sang-yong and Hee-joong; but then Byeong-hoon's personal feelings start to get in the way of business.

== Cast ==
- Uhm Tae-woong as Lee Byeong-hoon
- Park Shin-hye as Min-yeong
- Choi Daniel as Lee Sang-yong
- Park Chul-min as Cheol-bin
- Lee Min-jung as Kim Hee-joong
- Jeon Ah-min as Jae-pil
- Song Sae-byeok as Kim Hyeon-gon
- Ryu Hyun-kyung as Seon-ah
- Kim Ji-young as Yoo-mi
- Kwon Hae-hyo as President Kwon, loan shark boss
- Lee Dae-yeon as pastor, Hee-joong's uncle
- Lee Mi-do as So-yun
- Kim Il-woong as Dae-hyeon
- Lee Mi-so as Mi-soo; Roxanne in stage play
- Do Yong-gu as church elder
- Lee Chang-ju as proposing man
- Jang Eun-ah as proposing woman
- Lee Do-woo as target woman
- Kim Ju-yeong as Cyrano in stage play
- Weon Hyeon-jun as Kwon's goon
- Seo Dae-hyeon as Kwon's goon
- Han Dae-ryong as Kwon's goon
- Bae Yun-beom as Byeong-hoon's friend
- Song Da-eun as yoga instructor
- Jo Jae-hyeong as cello player

== Production ==
Kim Hyun-seok wrote the first draft of the script in his 20s while a student on his military service, eventually forgetting about it as his career progressed. In the 1990s a production company bought the rights to the script but no movie was produced, and after the option expired, the rights reverted to Kim. After he wrote and directed Scout in 2007, Kim returned to the Agency draft. He worked on the script for 2 years, changing almost everything in the first draft but the film's basic framework. Comparing the original draft to the final script, Kim said "(What) changed the most was that in my 20s I had a fantasy of love—like I believed if I lived well, then I could meet a beautiful woman. But years later, when I began the movie, my idea of love changed. It's not that you trust someone and therefore fall in love, but that you trust someone because you love them."

Originally titled "Agency," the first draft made no mention of "Cyrano de Bergerac." Kim had seen the Gérard Depardieu film as a college student, so he allows he may have been unknowingly influenced by it. In 2005 veteran director Bae Chang-ho mentioned to Kim the script's similarity to the play, so Kim decided while retooling the script in 2007 to overtly reference Cyrano de Bergerac—turning the characters into a theater troupe, and setting the lovers' flashbacks in France.

Kim candidly admitted that he cast the four main actors because their previous TV dramas had been popular, and he wanted to use the momentum from their recent successes.

== Reception ==
This low-budget romantic comedy became the sleeper hit of 2010, attracting more than 2.7 million viewers with a simple plot and an under-the-radar cast.

The film has likewise garnered positive reviews, with critics calling it "a breath of fresh air" (The Korea Times), with "sharp, intelligent direction" and "well-developed characters" (Korea JoongAng Daily). Director Kim Hyun-seok's "experience shows in the deftly drawn characters and the way in which the screenplay holds together multiple strands without losing sight of the film's main emotional arc" (Film Business Asia). Koreanfilm.org credits Kim as "one of the few Korean directors who can make gentle, comic melodramas without driving them aground with forced emoting or lathering them with soap. He knows the difference between genuine witticism and crude slapstick that passes for 'comedy' in so many recent movies" and describes the film as "a deft, clever crowd-pleaser that is also a genuinely lovely motion picture, the kind of Korean cinema undeservingly ignored in the foreign market, and another winner from the redoubtable Kim Hyun-seok."

Kim won best screenplay at the 2010 Blue Dragon Film Awards.

It is considered Lee Min-jung's breakout film, for which she won five Best New Actress awards.

== Digital album ==
A digital album was released on September 7, 2010, which featured two songs recorded by the movie's four stars, along with respective accompanying music videos. The song "당신이었군요" (It Was You) was a light ballad by Park Shin-hye and Lee Min-jung. While Uhm Tae-woong and Choi Daniel's duet "청계산 가버렸네" (I went to Cheonggyesan Mountain) had a more fun, upbeat sound.

== Spin-off ==
Cable channel tvN produced a spin-off television series titled Dating Agency: Cyrano in 2013. Lee Jong-hyuk took over the role of Byeong-hoon, and Sooyoung (of Girls' Generation) played Min-yeong.
