= Kim Sang-bum (film editor) =

South Korean filmmaker (born 1954)

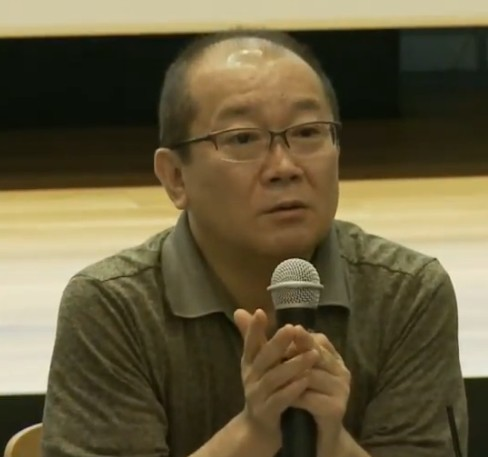
- Born: August 14, 1954 (age 72); South Korea
- Occupation: Film editor

Korean name
- Hangul: 김상범
- Hanja: 金尙範
- RR: Gim Sangbeom
- MR: Kim Sangbŏm

Kim Sang-bum (born August 14, 1954) is a South Korean film editor, and filmmaker, best known for his collaborations with director Park Chan-wook.

== Career ==
Park has the longest-standing partnership is with Editor Kim Sang-bum. Their relationship dates back to when Park, then a college student, joined the directing department led by editor-in-chief Kim Sang-bum. Kim Sang-bum's late father, Editor Kim Hee-soo, was involved in Park Chan-wook's debut film, The Moon Is... the Sun's Dream as editor. Since the film Joint Security Area (1998), Kim Sang-bum has edited all of Park Chan-wook's works up until The Handmaiden, except for Stoker (2013).

== Filmography ==
- Art Museum by the Zoo (1998)
- Judgement (short film, 1999)
- A-rong's Big Expedition (1999)
- A Great Chinese Restaurant (1999)
- The Spy (1999)
- Yellow Hair (1999)
- Tell Me Something (1999)
- Memento Mori (1999)
- Spooky School (2000)
- Interview (2000)
- Bloody Beach (2000)
- Joint Security Area (2000)
- Ghost Taxi (2000)
- Indian Summer (2001)
- The Humanist (2001)
- My Sassy Girl (2001)
- Guns & Talks (2001)
- Waikiki Brothers (2001)
- Hi! Dharma! (2001)
- No Blood No Tears (2002)
- L'Abri (Bus Stop) (2002)
- Sympathy for Mr. Vengeance (2002)
- The Way Home (2002)
- No Comment (2002)
- Surprise (aka Surprise Party) (2002)
- YMCA Baseball Team (2002)
- A Bizarre Love Triangle (2002)
- Conduct Zero (2002)
- Double Agent (2003)
- The Classic (2003)
- Wishing Stairs (2003)
- Oldboy (2003)
- Ice Rain (2004)
- Windstruck (2004)
- Someone Special (2004)
- Hi! Dharma 2: Showdown in Seoul (2004)
- Three... Extremes (2004)
- Blood Rain (2005)
- Sympathy for Lady Vengeance (2005)
- Murder, Take One (2005)
- Sad Movie (2005)
- The Beast and the Beauty (2005)
- Boy Goes to Heaven (2005)
- King and the Clown (2005)
- If You Were Me 2 (2006)
- Daisy (2006)
- Bloody Tie (2006)
- Radio Star (2006)
- Traces of Love (2006)
- Once in a Summer (2006)
- I'm a Cyborg, But That's OK (2006)
- Project Makeover (2007)
- Bunt (2007)
- My Son (2007)
- Epitaph (2007)
- For Eternal Hearts (2007)
- The Happy Life (2007)
- Going by the Book (2007)
- Shadows in the Palace (2007)
- All We Need Is Courage (2008)
- Girl Scout (2008)
- Like Father, Like Son (2008)
- Sunny (2008)
- My Mighty Princess (2008)
- Go Go 70s (2008)
- Thirst (2009)
- My Girlfriend Is a Cyborg (2009)
- A Blood Pledge (2009)
- Possessed (2009)
- The Sword with No Name (2009)
- Good Morning President (2009)
- Men without Women (2009)
- Blades of Blood (2010)
- The Servant (2010)
- The Man from Nowhere (2010)
- Cyrano Agency (2010)
- The Recipe (2010)
- The Unjust (2010)
- Haunters (2010)
- Battlefield Heroes (2011)
- If You Were Me 5 (2011)
- Mama (2011)
- The Front Line (2011)
- Leafie, A Hen into the Wild (2011)
- Hindsight (2011)
- Pained (2011)
- A Reason to Live (2011)
- Unbowed (2012)
- Pacemaker (2012)
- Nameless Gangster: Rules of the Time (2012)
- Architecture 101 (2012)
- Duresori: The Voice of the East (2012)
- A Muse (2012)
- The Concubine (2012)
- Whatcha Wearin'? (2012)
- The Tower (2012)
- Day Trip (short film, 2012)
- The Berlin File (2013)
- South Bound (2013)
- Born to Sing (2013)
- Hide and Seek (2013)
- Hope (2013)
- Hwayi: A Monster Boy (2013)
- Commitment (2013)
- 11 A.M. (2013)
- The Attorney (2013)
- Man in Love (2014)
- Venus Talk (2014)
- Tabloid Truth (2014)
- Obsessed (2014)
- Mad Sad Bad (2014)
- Kundo: Age of the Rampant (2014)
- Haemoo (2014)
- Scarlet Innocence (2014)
- Cart (2014)
- Chronicle of a Blood Merchant (2015)
- C'est si bon (2015)
- The Shameless (2015)
- Minority Opinion (2015)
- Inside Men (2015)
- The Sound of a Flower (2015)
- The Handmaiden (2016)
- Seondal: The Man Who Sells the River (2016)
- Asura: The City of Madness (2016)
- Misbehavior (2017)
- New Trial (2017)
- Lucid Dream (2017)
- A Taxi Driver (2017)
- I Can Speak (2017)
- The Sheriff in Town (2017)
- The Spy Gone North (2018)
- Black Money (2019)
- Yaksha: Ruthless Operations (2022)
- Decision to Leave (2022)
- No Other Choice (2025)
- The People Upstairs (2025)

== Awards and nominations ==
Award	Year	Category	Nominee(s)	Result	Ref.
1st Korean Film Awards	2002	Best Editing	Sympathy for Mr. Vengeance	Won	
12th Chunsa Film Art Awards	2004	Best Editing	Oldboy	Won	
41st Grand Bell Awards	2004	Best Editing	Oldboy	Won	
Korean Film Awards	2004	Best Editing	Oldboy	Nominated	
13th Chunsa Film Art Awards	2005	Best Editing	Blood Rain	Won	
43rd Grand Bell Awards	2006	Best Editing	Murder, Take One	Won	
47th Grand Bell Awards	2010	Best Editing	The Man from Nowhere	Won	
8th Korean Film Awards	2010	Best Editing	The Man from Nowhere	Won	
Apolo Awards	2016	Best Editing (Note: Team with Kim Jae-bum)	The Handmaiden	Nominated	
Asian Film Awards	2016	Best Editing	The Handmaiden	Nominated	
39th Blue Dragon Film Awards	2017	Best Editing	The Spy Gone North	Nominated	
55th Grand Bell Awards	2018	Best Editing	The Spy Gone North	Nominated	
Asian Film Awards	2023	Best Editing	Decision to Leave	Nominated	
Blue Dragon Film Awards	2022	Best Editing	Decision to Leave	Nominated	
Boston Society of Film Critics	2022	Best Editing	Decision to Leave	Won	
British Academy Film Awards	2023	Best Editing	Decision to Leave	Longlisted	
Chicago Film Critics Association	2022	Best Best Editing	Decision to Leave	Nominated	
Grand Bell Awards	2022	Best Film Editing	Decision to Leave	Nominated	
Hollywood Critics Association Creative Arts Awards	2023	Best Editing	Decision to Leave	Nominated	
Seattle Film Critics Society	2023	Best Film Editing	Decision to Leave	Nominated	
Sunset Circle Awards	2022	Best Editing	Decision to Leave	Nominated	
Valladolid International Film Festival	2022	José Salcedo Award for Best Editing	Decision to Leave	Won	
The Astra Awards	2025	Best Editing	No Other Choice (Note: Team with Kim Ho-Bin)	Nominated	
Blue Dragon Film Awards	2025	Best Editing	No Other Choice	Nominated	
Chicago Film Critics Association Awards	2025	Best Editing	No Other Choice	Nominated	
DiscussingFilm's Global Film Critics Awards	2026	Best Film Editing	No Other Choice	2nd Runner-up	
Florida Film Critics Circle	2025	Best Editing	No Other Choice	Nominated	
Gold Derby Film Awards	2025	Best Film Editing	No Other Choice	Nominated	
Midnight Critics Circle	2026	Best Editing	No Other Choice	Runner-up	
New Jersey Film Critics Circle	2025	Best Editing	No Other Choice	Nominated	
Newport Beach Film Festival	2025	Outstanding Editing Feature	No Other Choice	Won	
North Carolina Film Critics Association	2026	Best Editing	No Other Choice	Nominated	
North Dakota Film Society	2026	Best Editing	No Other Choice	Nominated	
Online Association Of Female Film Critics	2025	Best Editing	No Other Choice	Nominated	
Online Film Critics Society	2026	Best Editing	No Other Choice	Nominated	
Puerto Rico Critics Association	2025	Best Editing	No Other Choice	Runner-up	
Baeksang Arts Awards	2026	Best Technical Achievement	Good News	Nominated	
Blue Dragon Film Awards	2026	Best Editing	Good News	Pending	
