= Jung Woo =

South Korean actor

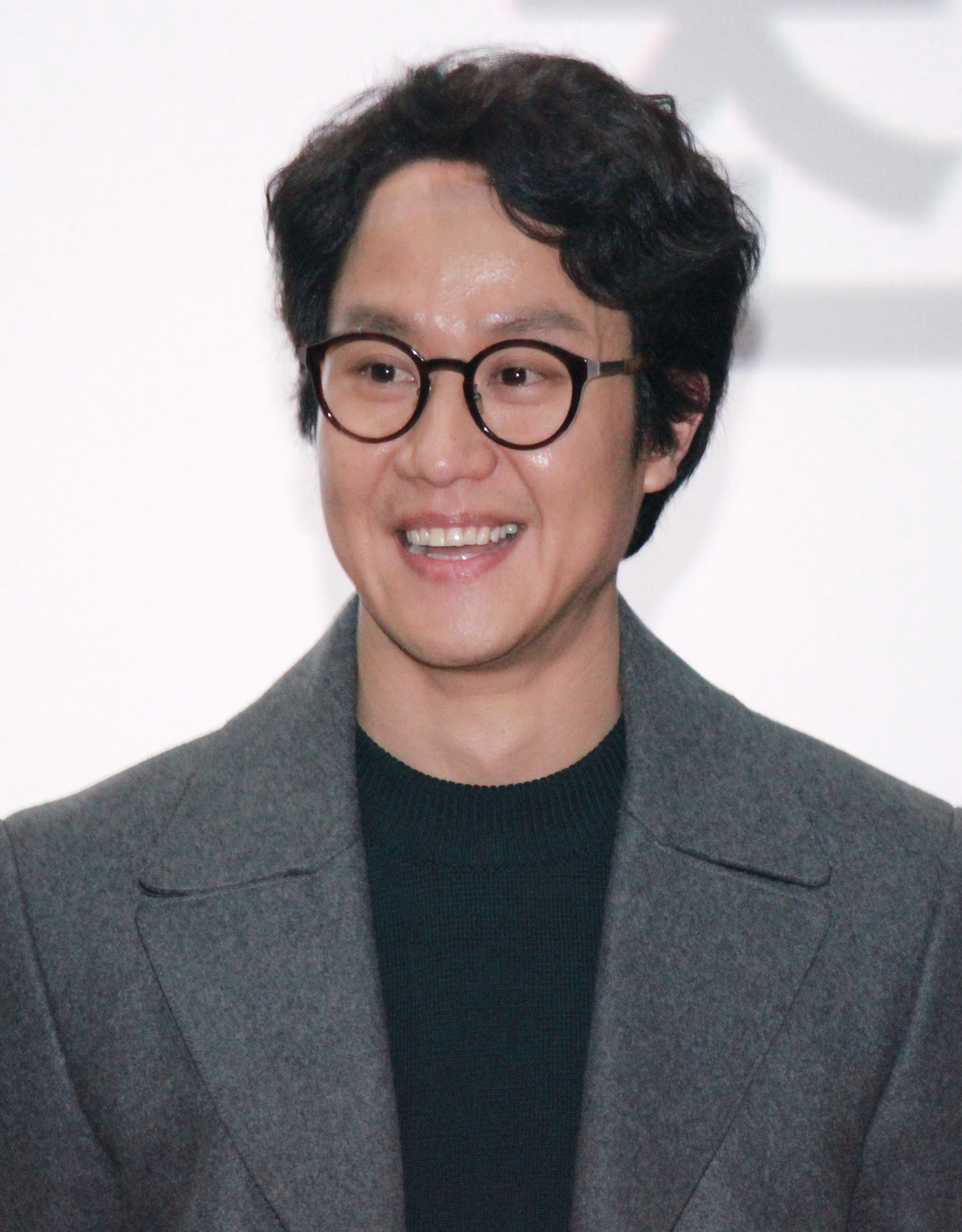
- Jung in February 2015
- Born: Kim Jung-guk; January 14, 1981 (age 45); Beomil-dong, Dong-gu, Busan, South Korea
- Education: Kyung Hee University (Master's degree in Cultural Contents Studies)
- Occupation: Actor
- Years active: 2001–present
- Agent: Saram Entertainment
- Spouse: Kim Yoo-mi (m. 2016)

Korean name
- Hangul: 김정국
- RR: Gim Jeongguk
- MR: Kim Chŏngguk

Stage name
- Hangul: 정우
- RR: Jeong U
- MR: Chŏng U
- Website: bhent.co.kr

Kim Jung-guk (Korean: 김정국; born January 14, 1981), known professionally as Jung Woo (정우), is a South Korean actor. He is best known for his roles in the drama Reply 1994 (2013) and You Are the Best! (2013).

== Career ==
Jung Woo made his acting debut in 2006, and began his career appearing in minor roles on film and television. He drew attention in 2008 for his turn as a morally challenged but lovable villain in action film Spare, the directorial debut of Lee Seong-han.

In 2009, Lee directed Jung Woo again, this time in the leading role in Wish, a film which Jung Woo had written himself based on his own experiences as a troubled youth dreaming of becoming the number one fighter at his school. The character uses his real name Kim Jung-guk and nickname Jjianggu, the movie was shot at his childhood home and high school, Busan Commercial High School, and Jung Woo's real-life friends play themselves in the film. Spanning the years from Jjianggu's school life to his father's last days, the film was an official selection at the 2009 Busan International Film Festival. Jung Woo was praised for his performance, and won Best New Actor at the prestigious Grand Bell Awards in 2010.

In 2013, Jung Woo played a supporting role as a baker who falls for a divorced single mother in the family drama You Are the Best!. His mainstream popularity further increased when he was cast as one of the main characters of Reply 1994, a cable drama about a group of young students from different regions in Korea living together in a boarding house while going to college in 1990s Seoul. This was followed by a role in arthouse spy movie Red Family, produced by Kim Ki-duk.

Jung Woo next starred in the 2015 musical biopic C'est Si Bon. Set in the eponymous live music cafe in Mugyo-dong, downtown Seoul, the film depicted the formation of legendary folk music group Twin Folio, which was active from the 1960s to 80s.

In 2019, Jung was cast in the gangster movie The Boiling Blood.

== Personal life ==
Jung Woo married actress Kim Yoo-mi on January 16, 2016. They became a couple after starring together in the 2013 film Red Family.

== Filmography ==
=== Film ===
Year	Title	Role	Notes	Ref.
2001	Running 7 Dogs			
2002	Break Out	Henchman 7		
2002	Conduct Zero	Gangster Dan-gun		
2003	My Tutor Friend	Thug		
2003	A Good Lawyer's Wife	Neighborhood bully		
2003	Spring Breeze	Young friend 2		
2004	He Was Cool	Ppa-Park-yi		
2004	Spin Kick	Park Do-soo		
2005	The President's Last Bang	Han Jae-guk		
2006	Bloody Tie	Detective Kim		
2006	The City of Violence	young Wang-jae		
2006	How the Lack of Love Affects Two Men	Ignorant person		
2008	Fate	Choi Jung-hak		
2008	Spare	Gil-do		
2008	Dachimawa Lee	MP captain		
2008	Summer Whispers	Jung-sik		
2009	Wish	Jjianggu	Also screenwriter	
2012	Doomsday Book	Joong-dong	segment "A Brave New World"	
2013	Red Family	Kim Jae-hong		
2015	C'est Si Bon	Oh Geun-tae		
2015	The Himalayas	Park Mu-taek		
2017	New Trial	Lee Joon-young		
2018	Heung-boo: The Revolutionist	Heung-boo		
2018	Fifth Column	Yoon Joong-hyeon		
2020	Best Friend	Yoo Dae-kwon		
2022	Hot Blooded	Park Hee-soo		
2022	Hot Blood: The Original	Park Hee-soo	Extended version	
2025	Audition 109	Jjang-goo	Also director, screenwriter, and producer	
TBA	Don't Touch Dirty Hands			

=== Television series ===
Year	Title	Role	Notes	Ref.
2005	Sad Love Story	Lee Min-ho		
2005	Princess Lulu	Assistant manager Lee		
2007	If In Love...Like Them			
2007	Cruel Love	Han Jung-woo		
2009	Cinderella Man	Ma Yi-san		
2009	Green Coach	Kang Seok-jong		
2010	Blossom Sisters	Kim No-shik		
2012	KBS Drama Special – The Great Dipper	Park Yong-dae	One-act drama	
2013	You Are the Best!	Seo Jin-wook		
2013	Reply 1994	Sseureki (nickname)		
2015–2016	Reply 1988	Sseureki (nickname)	Cameo	
2022	Mental Coach Jegal	Jegal Gil		
2023	Miraculous Brothers	Yuk Dong-joo		

=== Web series ===
Year	Title	Role	Ref.
2021	Mad for Each Other	Noh Hwi-Oh	
2022	A Model Family	Dong-ha	

=== Television shows ===
Year	Title	Role	Notes	Ref.
2016	Youth Over Flowers	Cast member		
2021	Warning of the Earth - 100 People's Leading Show	Host	Documentary	
2022	100 Reading Show - Reading the Earth	Host		

=== Music video appearances ===
Year	Song title	Artist	Ref.
2004	"Incurable Disease"	Wheesung	
2004	"Fall in Love with Someone"	Wheesung	
2006	"The Day"	JeA and Kim Yeon-ji	
2007	"New Skin"	Monday Kiz	
2007	"A Good Man"	Monday Kiz	
2007	"The Man"	Monday Kiz	
2007	"What Can I Do If I Like It"	Black Pearl	
2007	"Finally It's You"	Black Pearl	
2007	"White Lie"	Lee Seung-gi	
2007	"Why Are You Leaving"	Lee Seung-gi	
2008	"That Person"	SeeYa	
2008	"Without Me"	SeeYa	
2009	"Jjarajajja"	Joo Hyun-mi and Seohyun	
2009	"It's Over"	Jung Yup	

== Awards and nominations ==
Name of the award ceremony, year presented, category, nominee of the award, and the result of the nomination
Award ceremony	Year	Category	Nominee / Work	Result	Ref.
APAN Star Awards	2014	Excellence Award, Actor in a Miniseries	Reply 1994	Won	
Asia Model Awards	2014	Popularity Award	Jung Woo	Won	
Baeksang Arts Awards	2014	Best New Actor – Television	Reply 1994	Won	
Baeksang Arts Awards	2014	Most Popular Actor (TV)	Reply 1994	Nominated	
Baeksang Arts Awards	2017	Most Popular Actor (film)	New Trial	Nominated	
Baeksang Arts Awards	2022	Best Actor – Film	Hot Blooded	Nominated	
Bucheon International Fantastic Film Festival	2015	Fantasia Award	C'est Si Bon	Won	
Grand Bell Awards	2010	Best New Actor	Wish	Won	
KBS Drama Awards	2013	Best New Actor	You Are the Best!	Won	
Seoul International Drama Awards	2014	People's Choice Actor	Reply 1994	Nominated	
