= 38th Blue Dragon Film Awards =

2017 edition of award ceremony

- Date: November 25, 2017
- Site: Kyung Hee University's Peace Palace Hall, Seoul
- Hosted by: Kim Hye-soo; Lee Sun-kyun

Highlights
- Best Film: A Taxi Driver
- Most awards: A Taxi Driver (3)
- Most nominations: The Merciless (9)

Television coverage
- Network: SBS
- Duration: 120 minutes

The 38th Blue Dragon Film Awards (Korean: 제38회 청룡영화상) ceremony was held on November 25, 2017 at Kyung Hee University's Peace Palace Hall in Seoul. It was live broadcast on SBS and hosted by Kim Hye-soo and Lee Sun-kyun. Organized by Sports Chosun (a sister brand of The Chosun Ilbo), the annual award show honored the best in Korean language films released from October 7, 2016 to October 3, 2017.

== Nominations and winners ==
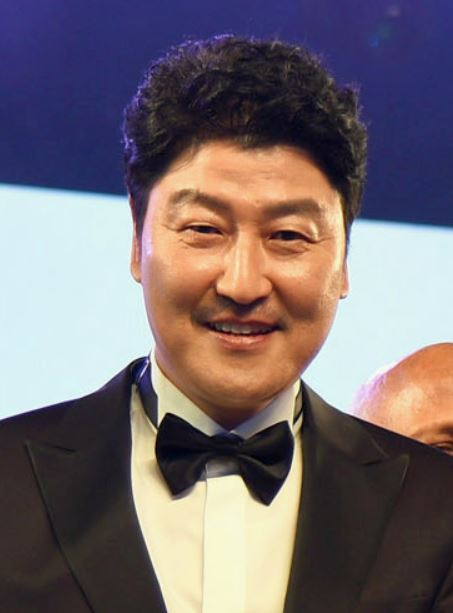
Song Kang-ho, Best Actor winner

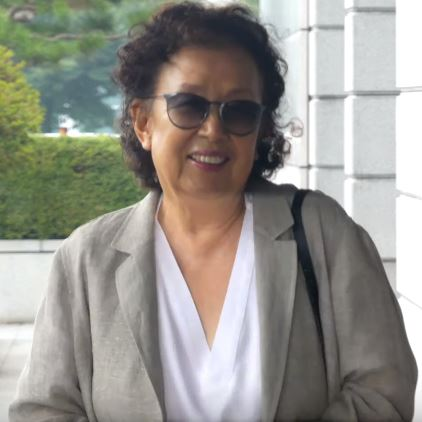
Na Moon-hee, Best Actress winner

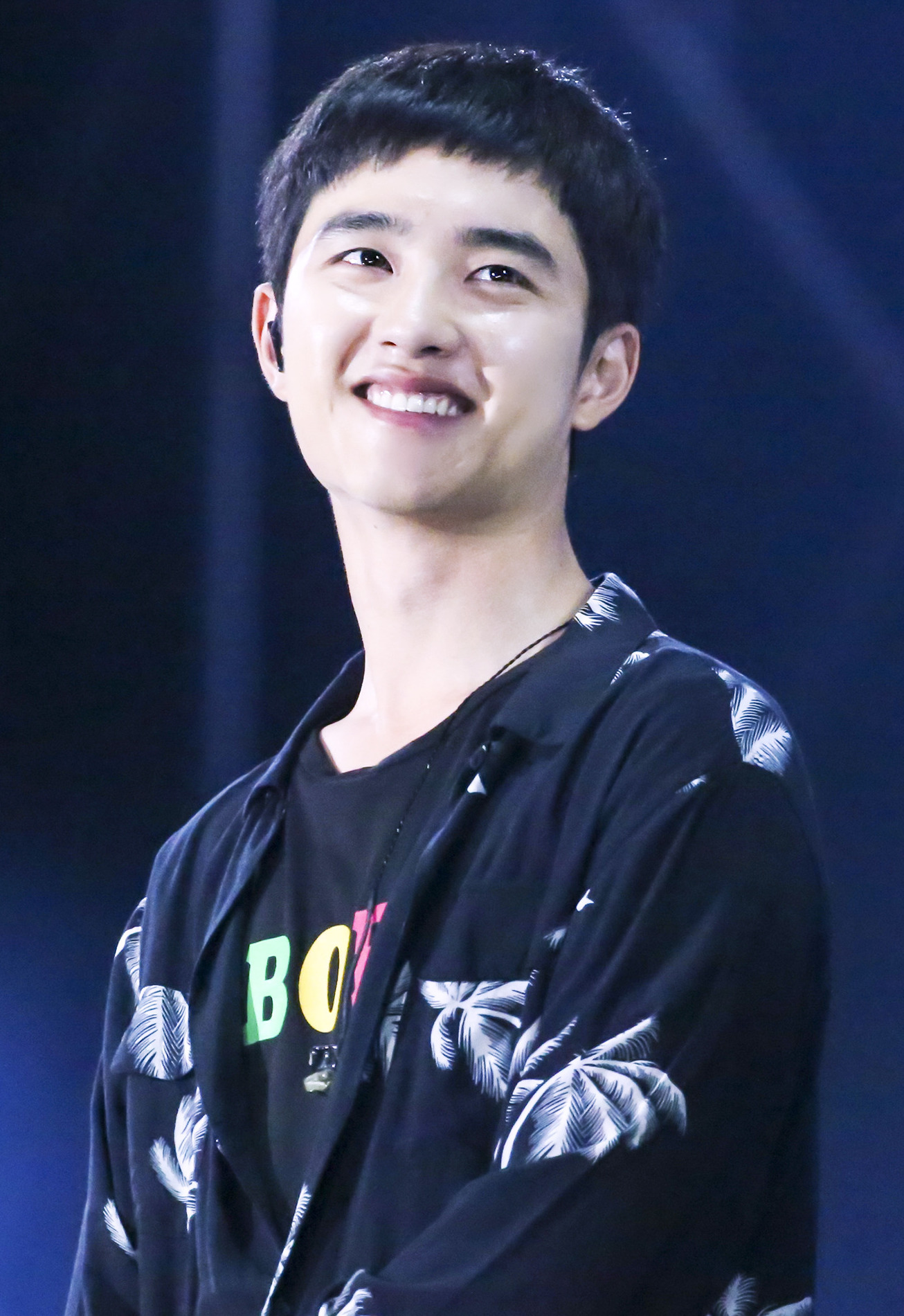
Do Kyung-soo, Best New Actor winner

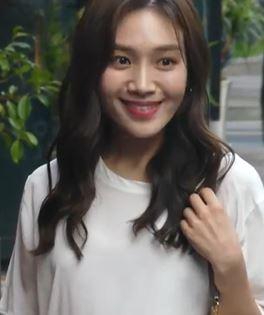
Choi Hee-seo, Best New Actress winner

Complete list of nominees and winners

Winners are listed first, highlighted in boldface, and indicated with a double dagger (‡).

=== Main awards ===
| **Best Film** | **Best Director** |
| **A Taxi Driver**‡; Anarchist from Colony; The Fortress; The King; The Merciless | **Kim Hyun-seok** - **I Can Speak**‡; Byun Sung-hyun - The Merciless; Hwang Dong-hyuk - The Fortress; Jang Hoon - A Taxi Driver; Lee Joon-ik - Anarchist from Colony |
| **Best Leading Actor** | **Best Leading Actress** |
| **Song Kang-ho** - **A Taxi Driver**‡; Jo In-sung - The King; Kim Yoon-seok - The Fortress; Lee Byung-hun - The Fortress; Sul Kyung-gu - The Merciless | **Na Moon-hee** - **I Can Speak**‡; Gong Hyo-jin - Missing; Kim Ok-vin - The Villainess; Moon So-ri - The Running Actress; Yum Jung-ah - The Mimic |
| **Best Supporting Actor** | **Best Supporting Actress** |
| **Jin Seon-kyu** - **The Outlaws**‡; Bae Seong-woo - The King; Kim Dae-myung - Bluebeard; Kim Hee-won - The Merciless; Yoo Hae-jin - A Taxi Driver | **Kim So-jin** - **The King**‡; Jeon Hye-jin - The Merciless; Kim Hae-sook - New Trial; Lee Jung-hyun - The Battleship Island; Yeom Hye-ran - I Can Speak |
| **Best New Actor** | **Best New Actress** |
| **Do Kyung-soo** - **My Annoying Brother**‡; Koo Kyo-hwan - Jane; Kim Jun-han - Anarchist from Colony; Nam Yeon-woo - Lost to Shame; Ryu Jun-yeol - A Taxi Driver | **Choi Hee-seo** - **Anarchist from Colony**‡; Lim Yoona - Confidential Assignment; Lee Min-ji - Jane; Lee Sang-hee - Our Love Story; Lee Soo-kyung - Yongsoon |
| **Best New Director** | **Best Screenplay** |
| **Lee Hyun-joo** - **Our Love Story**‡; Jo Hyun-hoon - Jane; Kang Yoon-sung - The Outlaws; Lee Joo-young - Single Rider; Moon So-ri - The Running Actress | **Hwang Dong-hyuk** - **The Fortress**‡; Eom Yoo-na - A Taxi Driver; Hwang Seong-gu - Anarchist from Colony; Jo Hyun-hoon - Jane; Lee Joo-young - Single Rider |
| **Best Cinematography-Lighting** | **Best Editing** |
| **Jo Hyung-rae & Park Jeong-woo** - **The Merciless**‡; Kim Ji-yong & Jo Gyu-young - The Fortress; Kim Woo-hyung & Kim Seung-gyu - The King; Lee Mo-gae & Lee Sung-hwan - The Battleship Island; Park Jung-hoon & Lee Hae-won - The Villainess | **Shin Min-kyung** - **The King**‡; Kim Sang-beom & Kim Jae-beom - The Merciless; Kim Seon-min - The Outlaws; Lee Jin - Confidential Assignment; Yoon Seok-min - Criminal Conspiracy |
| **Best Art Direction** | **Technical Award** |
| **Lee Hoo-kyung** - **The Battleship Island**‡; Chae Kyung-seon - The Fortress; Han Ah-reum - The Merciless; Jo Hwa-sung - A Taxi Driver; Lee Na-gyeom - The King | **Kwon Ki-deok** (Stunts) - **The Villainess**‡; Heo Myung-haeng (Stunts) - The Outlaws; Kim Han-joon & Son Seung-hyun (Visual Effects) - The Battleship Island; Kim Seok-won & Moon Cheol-woo (Sound Effects) - The Mimic; Shim Hyun-seop (Costumes) - Anarchist from Colony |
**Best Music**
**Jo Yeong-wook** - **A Taxi Driver**‡; Jo Yeong-wook - Single Rider; Kim Hong-jip & Lee Jin-hee - The Merciless; Mowg - The King; Ryuichi Sakamoto - The Fortress

=== Other awards ===
- Best Short Film:
  - **A Hand-written Poster** (Director Kwak Eun-mi)‡
- Audience Choice Award for Most Popular Film:
  - **1st** – **A Taxi Driver**‡
    - 2nd – Confidential Assignment
    - 3rd – Master
    - 4th – Luck Key
    - 5th – The Outlaws
- Popular Star Award:
  - **Jo In-sung** - **The King**‡
  - **Kim Su-an** - **The Battleship Island**‡
  - **Na Moon-hee** - **I Can Speak**‡
  - **Sul Kyung-gu** - **The Merciless**‡

== Films with multiple wins ==
The following films received multiple wins:

| Wins | Films |
|---|---|
| 3 | A Taxi Driver |
| 2 | I Can Speak |
| 2 | The King |

== Films with multiple nominations ==
The following films received multiple nominations:

| Nominations | Films |
|---|---|
| 9 | The Merciless |
| 8 | The King |
| 8 | A Taxi Driver |
| 8 | The Fortress |
| 6 | Anarchist from Colony |
| 4 | The Outlaws |
| 4 | I Can Speak |
| 4 | The Battleship Island |
| 4 | Jane |
| 3 | Single Rider |
| 3 | The Villainess |
| 2 | The Mimic |
| 2 | The Running Actress |
| 2 | Confidential Assignment |
| 2 | Our Love Story |

== Presenters ==
Actor Cha Tae-hyun appeared and gave a memorial speech for Late Kim Ji-young (1938–2017), Late Yoon So-jeong (1944–2017), Late Kim Young-ae (1951–2017) and Late Kim Joo-hyuk (1972–2017).

| Order | Presenter | Award |
|---|---|---|
| 1 | Park Jung-min, Lee Sun-bin | Best New Actor |
| 2 | Park Hae-jin, Kim Tae-ri | Best New Actress |
| 3 | Yeon Sang-ho, Kim Su-an | Audience Choice Award for Most Popular Film |
| 4 | Kim Young-kwang, Park Bo-young | Best New Director |
| 5 | Jung Jin-young | Technical Award; Best Cinematography-Lighting; Best Editing |
| 6 | Choi Min-ho, Kim Ji-won | Best Music; Best Art Direction; Best Screenplay |
| 7 | Jun Kunimura, Choi Hee-seo | Best Supporting Actor |
| 8 | Kim Sung-kyun, Park So-dam | Best Supporting Actress |
| 9 | Park Byung-eun, Esom | Best Short Film |
| 10 | Steven Yeun | Best Director |
| 11 | Lee Byung-hun, Soo Ae | Best Actor |
| 12 | Daesang's CEO Im Jeong-bae, Go Doo-shim | Best Actress |
| 13 | Shin Ha-kyun, Do Kyung-soo | Best Film |

== Special performances ==
| Order | Artist | Performance | References |
|---|---|---|---|
| 1 | Daybreak | A Taxi Driver OST: Short Hair (단발머리) (Original: Cho Yong-pil); Only Walk The Flower Road (꽃길만 걷게 해줄게) | |
| 2 | Mamamoo | Yes I Am (나로 말할 것 같으면) | |
