= I Can Speak =

- Theatrical release poster
- Hangul: 아이 캔 스피크
- RR: Ai kaen seupikeu
- MR: Ai k'aen sŭp'ik'ŭ
- Directed by: Kim Hyun-seok
- Written by: Yoo Seung-hee
- Produced by: Lee Ha-young
- Starring: Na Moon-hee; Lee Je-hoon
- Cinematography: You Yok
- Edited by: Kim Sang-bum; Kim Jae-bum
- Music by: Lee Dong-joon
- Production companies: Myung Films; See Sun
- Distributed by: Lotte Entertainment; Little Big Pictures
- Release date: September 21, 2017 (South Korea)
- Running time: 119 minutes
- Country: South Korea
- Languages: Korean; English
- Box office: US$23.3 million

I Can Speak is a 2017 South Korean comedy-drama film based on a true story of comfort women directed by Kim Hyun-seok and distributed by Lotte Entertainment. The film depicts the story of the resolution of conviction for "comfort women" (HR121) of the Japanese military in 2007. Though the film is a comedy, the genre serves as a vehicle to discuss the deeper topic of Korean comfort women. The way the film illustrates Na Ok-Bun's enterprising attitude of her life and courageous testimony in front of the whole world were applauded. The film stars Na Moon-hee as Na Ok-Bun, with Lee Je-hoon as Park Min-Jae. The scene of Na Ok-Bun's testimony to the United States Congress was filmed at the Capitol Building of Virginia, in the city of Richmond.

== Plot ==
Nah Ok-Bun is an elderly woman who is notorious for filing citizen's complaint at her district office and is nicknamed "Goblin Granny". When Ok-Bun meets Park Min Jae, a young man who has recently been appointed as a junior civil service officer, she is dissatisfied with his attitude of not caring about her complaints and only trying to do the jobs that are assigned to him.

But there is an opportunity for these two as Ok-Bun wants to learn English. The senior class run by the local resident center does not fit her level, and the class at the English academy is too fast-paced and so she is eventually kicked out of the class. Ok-Bun sees Min Jae speaking English very fluently with a native speaker in the academy. Forgetting all the troubles she had with Min Jae, Ok-Bun asks Min Jae to teach her English. Min Jae refuses Ok-Bun's request because he does not want to take on the troublesome role. When Min Jae sees Ok-Bun taking care of his younger brother, Young Jae, he is moved by her warmth and agrees to become her English teacher. Min Jae teaches Ok-Bun and Ok-Bun's English improves.

Min Jae learns that Ok-Bun wishes to learn English to continue her friend Jeong-Shim's dream of testifying at the comfort women public hearing in Washington D.C. Ok-Bun and Jeong-Shim were both victims of the Japanese Military during World War II. Although Ok-Bun has prepared what to say in the public hearing, she can hardly speak as she is overwhelmed by the pressure she feels in the unfamiliar surroundings. When people start to question Ok-Bun's behavior, she hears and sees Min Jae in the audience which gives her the courage to testify against the atrocities of the Japanese Military.

== Cast ==
- Na Moon-hee as Na Ok-Bun, a frequent trouble making visitor at the local public government office who has filed over 8,000 civil complaints.
  - Choi Soo-in as young Na Ok-Bun
- Lee Je-hoon as Park Min-jae, a ninth-level civil servant who befriends Na Ok-Bun and teaches her English
- Yeom Hye-ran as Woman from Jinju
- Lee Sang-hee as Hye-jung
- Son Sook as Jung-sim
  - Lee Jae-in as young Jung-sim
- Kim So-jin as Geum-joo
- Park Chul-min as Team leader Yang
- Jung Yeon-joo as A-young
- Lee Ji-hoon as Jong-hyun
- Lee Dae-yeon as Borough chief
- Sung Yu-bin as Park Young-jae
- Woo Ji-hyun as Public service employee

== Reception ==
I Can Speak was released in theaters in Korea on September 21, 2017. On its opening weekend it topped the local box office, grossing US$5.2 million from 727,000 admissions over four days. By September 29, 2017, the film had surpassed the 1 million viewer mark and collected a total of US$8.1 million in ticket sales. During the Korean Chuseok holiday weekend, the movie attracted 462,939 viewers, increasing the total number of ticket sale to 2.86 million. According to the Korean Film Council, just twenty days after its release, I Can Speak had attracted 3 million viewers.

The film has won the prize for the "Comfort Women" victim scenario project which was sponsored by the Ministry of Gender Equality and Family. It was selected through a competition rate of 75: 1. The film was praised for its lively approach to the issue of comfort women which is based on anger and sadness. It was also selected for family film production support of Korean Film Council.

== Awards and nominations ==
Award ceremony	Category	Recipient(s)	Result	Ref.
1st The Seoul Awards	Best Actress	Na Moon-hee	Won	
1st The Seoul Awards	Best New Actress	Lee Sang-hee	Nominated	
11th Asia Pacific Screen Awards	Best Actress	Na Moon-hee	Nominated	
37th Korean Association of Film Critics Awards	Best Actress	Na Moon-hee	Won	
37th Korean Association of Film Critics Awards	Top 10 Films of the Year	I Can Speak	Won	
38th Blue Dragon Film Awards	Best Director	Kim Hyun-seok	Won	
38th Blue Dragon Film Awards	Best Leading Actress	Na Moon-hee	Won	
38th Blue Dragon Film Awards	Popular Star Award	Na Moon-hee	Won	
38th Blue Dragon Film Awards	Best Supporting Actress	Yeom Hye-ran	Nominated	
17th Director's Cut Awards	Films of the Year	I Can Speak	Won	
17th Director's Cut Awards	Best Actress	Na Moon-hee	Won	
4th Korean Film Producers Association Awards	Best Actress	Na Moon-hee	Won	
18th Women in Film Korea Awards	Woman in Film of the Year	Na Moon-hee	Won	
Cine 21 Awards	Best Director	Kim Hyun-seok	Won	
Cine 21 Awards	Best Actress	Na Moon-hee	Won	
9th KOFRA Film Awards	Best Actress	Na Moon-hee	Won	
54th Baeksang Arts Awards	Best Actress	Na Moon-hee	Won	
54th Baeksang Arts Awards	Best Supporting Actress	Yeom Hye-ran	Nominated	
23rd Chunsa Film Art Awards	Best Screenplay	Yoo Seung-hee	Nominated	
23rd Chunsa Film Art Awards	Best Actress	Na Moon-hee	Nominated	
27th Buil Film Awards	Best Actress	Na Moon-hee	Nominated	
27th Buil Film Awards	Best Screenplay	Yoo Seung-hee	Nominated	
55th Grand Bell Awards	Best Screenplay	Yoo Seung-hee	Nominated	
55th Grand Bell Awards	Best Actress	Na Moon-hee	Won	
1st Resistance Film Festival in Korea	Best Actor	Lee Je-hoon	Won	
