= Na Moon-hee =

South Korean actress (born 1941)

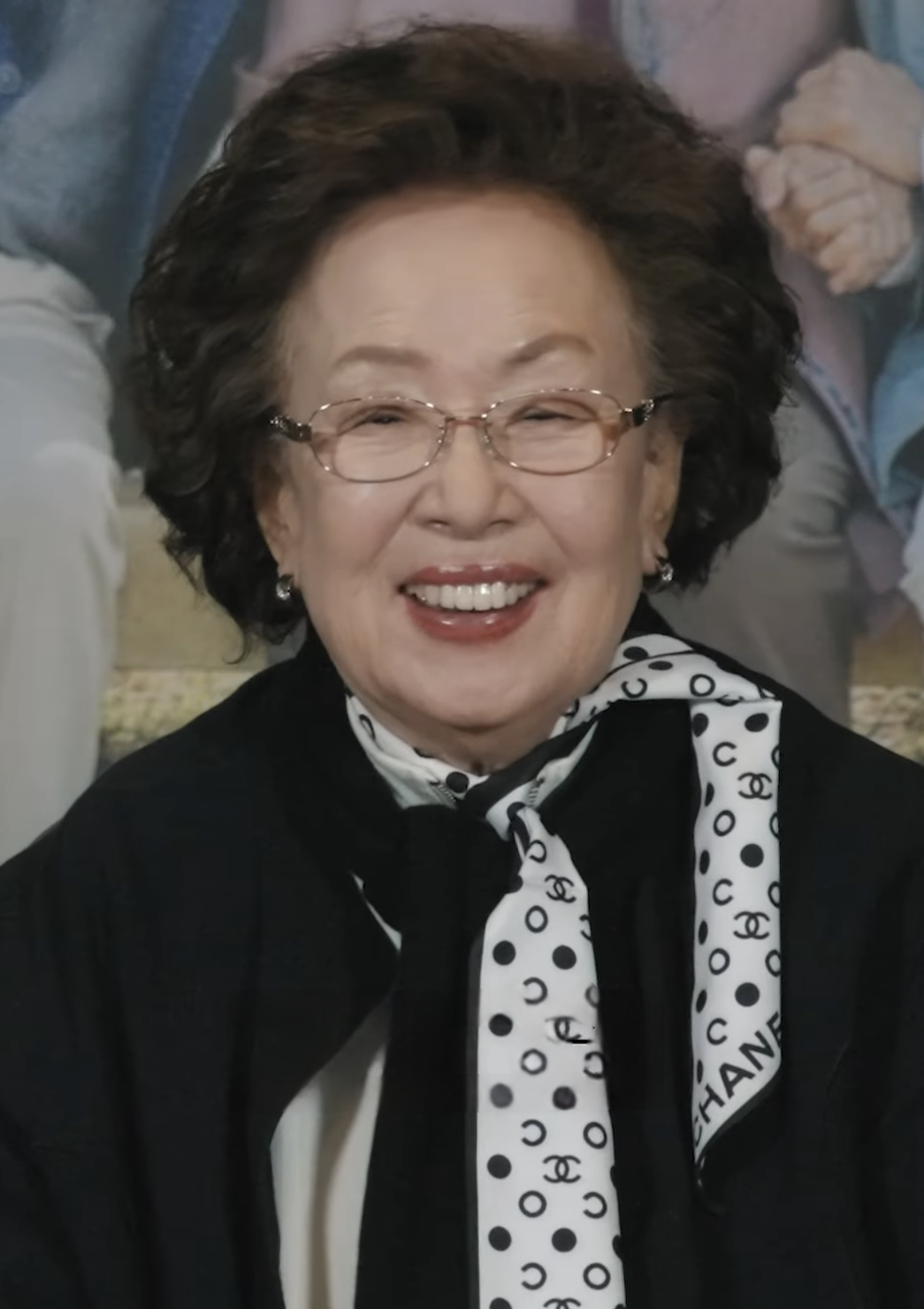
- Na in February 2024
- Born: Na Kyung-ja; November 30, 1941 (age 84); Beijing, Republic of China
- Education: Changduk Girls' High School, Seoul
- Occupation: Actress
- Years active: 1960–present
- Spouse: Yoo Yun-sik (m. 1965; died 2023)
- Children: 3
- Honours: Bogwan Order of Cultural Merit (2012)

Korean name
- Hangul: 나경자
- Hanja: 羅京子
- RR: Na Gyeongja
- MR: Na Kyŏngja

Stage name
- Hangul: 나문희
- Hanja: 羅文姬
- RR: Na Munhui
- MR: Na Munhŭi
- Website: thecnt.co.kr/star/namunhee

Signature
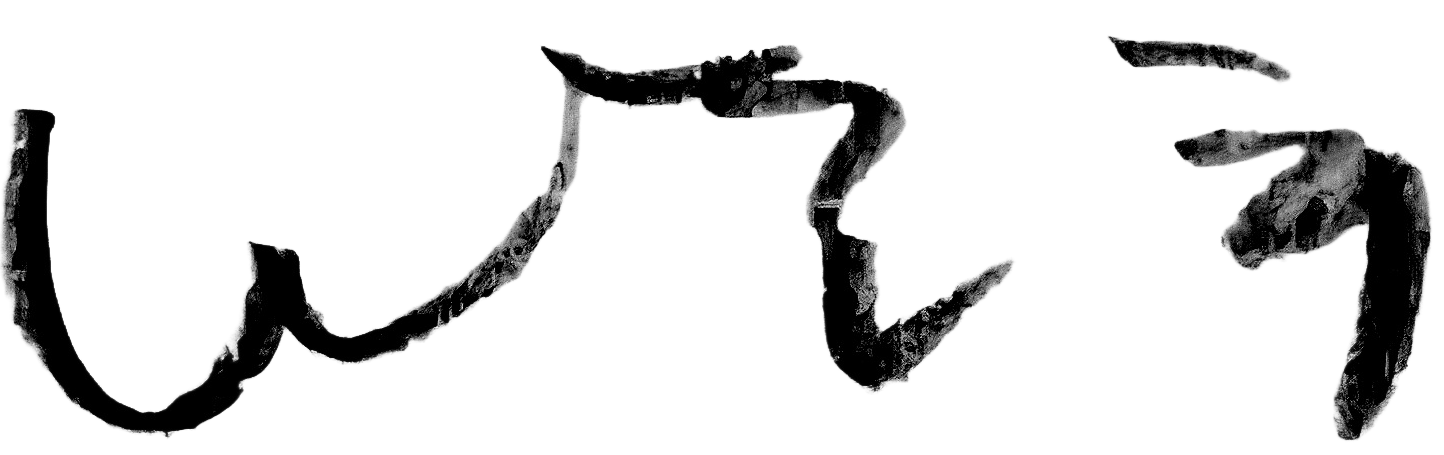

Na Moon-hee (Korean: 나문희; Na Kyung-ja, Korean: 나경자; November 30, 1941) is a South Korean actress. Since 1960, Na has had a prolific acting career in television and film spanning more than five decades. She established a classic Korean mother persona with her TV dramas Even if the Wind Blows, The Most Beautiful Goodbye in the World (written by Noh Hee-kyung), My Name is Kim Sam-soon, My Rosy Life, Goodbye Solo, Amnok River Flows (based on Der Yalu fließt), and It's Me, Grandma.

On the big screen, Na has received acclaim for her roles in Crying Fist, You Are My Sunshine, Cruel Winter Blues and I Can Speak. Her critically acclaimed film I Can Speak (2017) won her the Best Actress trophy in three prestigious award ceremonies: 54th Baeksang Arts Awards, 38th Blue Dragon Film Awards and 55th Grand Bell Awards — a feat that has yet to be repeated.

After a series of comic roles in sitcoms such as Unstoppable High Kick!, the veteran actress garnered newfound popularity and played the title character in big screen comedy Mission Possible: Kidnapping Granny K, followed by starring roles in Girl Scout, Harmony, Twilight Gangsters, and Miss Granny.

She received a Lifetime Achievement Award from MBC in 2010, and the prestigious Bo-gwan Order of Cultural Merit in 2012.

== Early life ==
Na Kyung-ja was born on November 30, 1941, in Beijing, China and grew up there until she was 5 years old. Her family came to Korea in the year of liberation, and once spent their childhood in Suwon, Gyeonggi-do. Her aunt is Na Hye-seok, the first female western painter in Korea, and her brother-in-law is actor Jeong Seung-ho.

== Career ==
In 1960, Na started her career onstage. In 1961, she debuted as a voice actor in the first public recruitment of MBC. Because of her longing for acting, she changed her job from a voice actor to a talent, and in 1976, she first appeared in a drama in Korea's first omnibus daily soap opera, High School Alumni. Afterwards, she played numerous roles in various works until the early 1990s, but she did not shine as an actor for a long time.

It was the KBS daily drama Even the Wind Blows, which was broadcast in 1995, that imprinted the name Na on people. She took on the role of a resolute grandmother who spoke a North Korean dialect, and the North Korean dialect acting she learned from a North Korean woman living in the neighborhood was deeply embedded in the minds of Korean viewers. Her presence shined through in her play and she was honored at the KBS Drama Awards, the first trophy of her own acting life. Not only she, but also with the same work, she achieved the feat of sweeping the Popularity Award in the TV category at the 32nd Baeksang Arts Awards and the Female Talent Award at the 23rd Korea Broadcasting Prizes the following year.

Afterwards, she gained great popularity by transforming into an authoritative CEO in My Lovely Sam Soon (2005), a nasty mother-in-law in My Rosy Life (2005), and a dancing grandmother in Famous Chil Princesses (2006). She also acted in films, for her role in the 2005 film Crying Fist, for which she won the Best Supporting Actress Award at the 42nd Grand Bell Awards. She later won the 7th Female Filmmaker of the Year Award, the 4th Max Movie Award for Best Supporting Actress Award, the 1st Korea Film Awards for Best Supporting Actress Award, She swept trophies including Best Supporting Actress at the 28th Blue Dragon Film Awards.

In 2006, with the family sitcom Unstoppable High Kick, it was so popular that it would not be an exaggeration to say that 2007 was the year of Na and reached its second heyday. In particular, the so-called 'pumpkin sweet potato' anger scene was greatly loved by the younger generation, and is still used as a source of numerous parodies. Even after that, she played the role of Mrs. Kwon Sun-bun who controls the kidnappers in the movie Mission Possible: Kidnapping Granny K (2007), played the role of Kim Moon-ok, the oldest inmate with a heartbreaking story in Harmony (2010), and traveled to Hawaii in Flesh-blooded gun robber (2010). She played the role of Kim Jung-ja, a bank robber who occupies a bank to raise money, and Oh Mal-soon, a swearing 70-year-old grandmother who boasts her son, in Miss Granny (2014), which drew attention with 8.65 million viewers nationwide.

In the 2016 drama Dear My Friends, she performed with veteran actors such as Kim Yeong-ok, Shin Goo, Kim Hye-ja, Go Doo-sim, Yoon Yeo-jeong, and Park Won-sook, and received favorable reviews for showing the life of an old age that draws sympathy from all generations and received a lot of love.

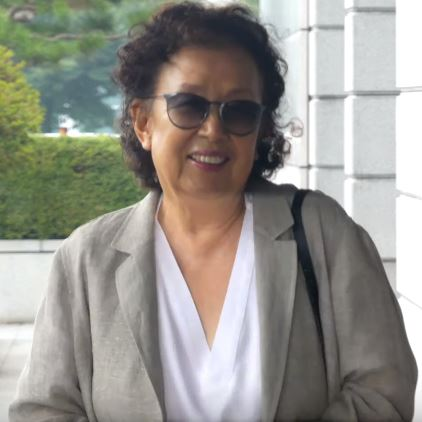
Na in 2019

In the movie I Can Speak (2017), in which she co-starred with Lee Je-hoon, she took on the role of Ok-bun, who is called 'goblin grandmother' among the officials of the ward office due to frequent complaints to the ward office, and took on the historically sensitive subject of 'comfort women'. was praised for excellent expression in Na's own way. At the end of the year, she swept the 'Best Actress Award' at major awards ceremonies such as The Seoul Awards, Korean Film Critics Association Awards, and Blue Dragon Film Awards, and she was re-evaluated as the best actress of 2017.

She is considered one of the 'national actors' and 'national mothers' actress loved by Korea both in name and reality, and as a representative role model for actresses.

== Personal life ==
Na is married and has three daughters.

== Filmography ==
=== Film ===
Year	Title	Role	Notes/Ref.
1998	The Quiet Family	Mrs. Kang	
2000	Just Do It!		Cameo
2002	My Beautiful Girl, Mari	Nam-woo's grandmother	Voice
2002	Saving My Hubby		
2003	Please Teach Me English	Moon-soo's mother	
2004	S Diary	Ji-ni's mother	
2004	Lovely Rivals	Yeo Mi-ok's mother	
2005	Crying Fist	Sang-hwan's grandma	
2005	You Are My Sunshine	Seok-jung's mother	
2006	Cruel Winter Blues	Dae-Sik's mother	
2007	Voice of a Murderer	Kyung-bae's mother	Cameo
2007	May 18	Na Joo-daek	
2007	Mission Possible: Kidnapping Granny K	Kwon Soon-boon	
2008	Girl Scout	Lee Yi-man	
2010	Harmony	Kim Moon-ok	
2010	Twilight Gangsters	Kim Jung-ja	
2014	Miss Granny	Oh Mal-soon	
2017	I Can Speak	Na Ok-boon	
2018	Love+Sling	Gui-bo's mother	
2019	A Little Princess	Mal-soon	
2020	Honest Candidate	Kim Ok-hee	
2020	Pawn	Seungi, grandmother (special appearance)	
2022	My Perfect Roommate	Geum-bun	
2022	Hero	Cho Maria	
2024	Picnic	Go Eun-sim	

=== Television series ===
Year	English	Korean	Role	Note
1969	Weird Kid	이상한 아이		
1970	Waterwheel	물레방아		
1973	In-laws	시댁		
1975	Hello	안녕		
1975	One's Way Home	귀로		
1976–1977	Girls' High School Days	여고 동창생	Bong Ran-yi	
1977	One Star or One	별 하나 나 하나		Children's drama
1977	Correspondent 001	특파원 001		Children's drama
1977	Arirang Oh!	아리랑 아!	Full-time wife	
1977	Until the Red Gold is Opened	빨간 능금이 열릴때까지		
1977	I Regret	후회합니다	In-sook	
1978	The Master	주인		
1978	X Search Party	X 수색대		Children's drama
1979	White Dandelion	하얀 민들레		
1979	Mom, I Like Dad	엄마, 아빠 좋아		
1979	Ms. Anguk-dong	안국동 아씨		
1980	Power Diary	전원일기	Multiple roles	A minor role
1980	Hundred Years Guest	백년손님		
1981	Jang Hee-bin	장희빈	Queen Myeongseong	Big dramas
1981	Hello	안녕하세요		
1982	Market People	시장 사람들		
1982	Can't Forget	못 잊어		
1983	The Stars are My Stars	저 별은 나의 별		
1984–1985	Love and Truth	사랑과 진실	Mrs. President	
1985	The Seaside Village	갯마을		
1986	First Love	첫사랑		
1986	Raw Hand	생인손	Yeon-ju	The special play of the two-part 8.15
1987	Firebird	불새		
1987	Life Story	인생화보		
1988	Three Women	세 여인		
1989	Making Memories	추억 만들기		
1989	Miscarriage	유산	Mrs.Oh	
1989	Second Republic	제2공화국	Kwon Chan -ju	
1990	Dangchu-dong People	당추동 사람들		
1990	Two Diaries	두 권의 일기	Principal teacher	
1990	Weird Family Weird School	별난가족 별난학교		Children's drama
1990	My Mother	나의 어머니		
1991	Another's Happiness	또 하나의 행복		
1991	City People	도시인		
1993	On Foot to the Sky	걸어서 하늘까지	Yeon-su Mo	
1993	Hope	희망		
1993	Dear Guitars	친애하는 기타 여러분	suwondaeg	
1993	MBC Best Theater: "Sundal, Byeong-gu and Okju-yang"	MBC 베스트극장: 순달씨와 병구씨와 옥주양	Ms. oh	One-act play
1993	One Roof Family	한지붕 세가족	An aunt	
1994	The Moon of Seoul	서울의 달	Grandma of the owner's house in Dal-dong	
1995	New Year's Special Drama: "Relationship is"	인연이란	Mrs. So	One-act play
1995	Changsha Special Drama: "Chanshangdanja"	창사특집극 - 찬품단자	choegosang-gung	One-act play
1995–1996	Even if the Wind Blows	바람은 불어도	grandmother	
1996	MBC Best Theatre: "Mom and the Gardenia"	MBC 베스트극장: 엄마와 치자꽃	Ha Yi-sun	One-act play
1996	Thief	도둑	The priest's sister-in-law	
1996	Mom's Flag	엄마의 깃발	Jeongsuk Mo	
1996	Open Your Heart	가슴을 열어라	Ha Yi-sun	
1996	The Most Beautiful Goodbye	세상에서 가장 아름다운 이별	Mama	One-act play
1996–1997	Im Kkeok-jung	임꺽정	봉단 모	
1997	Brothers	형제	병천댁	One-act play
1997	Because I Love You	사랑하니까	장모	
1997	The Reason I Live	내가 사는 이유	Kim Sook-ja	
1998	As We Live Our Lives	살다보면	Lee Gan-nan	
1998	Three Men and Three Women	남자 셋 여자 셋	Kim Yong-Rim's high school alumni	Special appearance
1998	Romance	로맨스	강 여사	
1999	House Above the Waves	파도위의 집		
1999	Beautiful Secret	아름다운 비밀	유민 모	One-act play
1999	Last War	마지막 전쟁		
1999	Did We Really Love?	우리가 정말 사랑했을까	Sin Sin-ja	
	You Don't Know My Mind	남의 속도 모르고	Na Do-ja	
2000	Mr. Duke	신 귀공자		
2000	Mom and Sister	엄마야 누나야	서씨	
2001	MBC Best Theater: "My Fiancee's Story"	MBC 베스트극장: 내 약혼녀 이야기		One-act play
2001	Tender Hearts	우리가 남인가요	Ohbunhee	
2001–2002	The Merchant	상도		
2002	The Woman	상도	임상옥 모, 한씨	
2002	You Are My World	그 여자 사람잡네	Bong Soon	
2002	Drama City: "A Very Special Gift"	드라마시티: 아주 특별한 선물	A grandmother	One-act play
2002–2003	The Maengs' Golden Era	맹가네 전성시대	금자 모	
2003	While You Were Dreaming	그대 아직도 꿈꾸고 있는가	Mrs. Hwang	
2003–2004	Apgujeong House	압구정 종갓집	Na Moon-hee	
2004	Love is All Around	물꽃마을 사람들	Shin Young-ja	
2004	Dog Bowl	설날특집극 - 개밥그릇	Oksoon	
2004	People of the Water Flower Village	사랑을 할거야	윤 여사	
2004	Changsa Special Drama: "We Become Water"	창사특집극: 우리가 물이 되어	Insoon	
2004–2005	Precious Family	부모님전상서	창수 모	
2006	My Lovely Sam Soon	내 이름은 김삼순	Na Hyun-sook	
2006	My Rosy Life	장밋빛 인생	Kang-tip-soon	
2006	Goodbye Solo	굿바이 솔로	Grandma Miyoung	
2006	Famous Chil Princesses	소문난 칠공주	Namdal-gu	
2006	High Kick!	거침없이 하이킥!	Na Moon-hee	
2007	Several Questions That Make Us Happy	우리를 행복하게 하는 몇 가지 질문		
2007	Woman of Matchless Beauty, Park Jung-geum	천하일색 박정금	Yoon Myung-ja	
2007	Worlds Within	그들이 사는 세상	Geomo	
2007	Amnok River Flows	압록강은 흐른다	Mireuk Mo	
2007–2008	Kimcheed Radish Cubes	깍두기	나달래	
2008–2009	My Precious You	내 사랑 금지옥엽	Mrs. Song In-soon	
2010	Happiness in the Wind	바람불어 좋은 날	나끝순	
2010	MBC Best Theater: "It's Me, Grandma'	MBC 일요 드라마 극장: 나야, 할머니	Jiyoon's grandmother	A one-act play
2011	I Believe in Love	사랑을 믿어요	차귀남	
2011–2012	Padam Padam	빠담빠담... 그와 그녀의 심장박동소리	Yang Kang Chil Mo	
2012	Five Fingers	다섯 손가락	Minbanwol	
2012	The Sons	아들녀석들	Jung Jung-sook	
2012	Mom is Acting Up	엄마가 뭐길래	Na Moon-hee	
2013	Wang's Family	왕가네 식구들	Ahn G-shim	
2014	Glorious Day	기분 좋은 날	Lee Sun-ok	
2015	The Three Witches	마녀의 성	Cheon Geum-ok	
2016	Dear My Friends	디어 마이 프렌즈	Moon Jung-ah	
2016	Father, I'll Take Care of You	아버님 제가 모실게요	Hwang Mi-ok	
2017	Rain or Shine	그냥 사랑하는 사이	Drug staker grandma	
2021	Navillera	나빌레라	Haenam	
2021	Taxi Driver	모범택시		
2025	When Life Gives You Tangerines	폭싹 속았수다	Grandma	
2026	Tantara	천천히 강렬하게	Mal-soon	
TBA	I Am Home	아임홈	Hong Jeong-hee	

=== Television shows ===
Year	Title	Role	Notes	Ref.
2022	Attack on Grandma	Host	The production is in full pre-air.	
2022	Hot Singers	Cast Member		
2022–present	One Round of the Neighborhood	Narrator	Season 2	

=== Music video appearances ===
Year	Title	Artist	Ref.
2026	"Dear My Crazy Soulmate"	IU	

== Theater ==
List of Stage Play(s)
Year	Title		Role	Theater	Date	Ref.
Year	English	Korean	Role	Theater	Date	Ref.
1965	Look Homeward, Angel	천사여 고향을 돌아보라		National Theater of Korea (Myeongdong)	Nov 30–Dec 3	
1992	Family on the road	길떠나는 가족		Batangol Small Theater in Seoul	July 1–August	
1992	Family on the road	길떠나는 가족		Grand Theater of the Cultural Arts Center, Hyundai	October 1 to 6	
1996	Mother	어머니	Thelma	Grand Theater of Dongsoong Art Center	May 18 to June 23	
1998	Sinpaguk The Unfilial Man Cries	신파극 불효자는 웁니다		Sejong Center for the Performing Arts in Seoul	January 10 18	
2008	'night, Mother	잘자요, 엄마	Thelma	Wonder Space Square Theater	November 2–29	
2015	'night, Mother	잘자요 엄마	Thelma	Art One Theater	July 3–August 30	

== Accolades ==
=== Awards and nominations ===
Awards and nominations
Year	Award	Category	Nominated work	Result
1973	9th Baeksang Arts Awards	Most Popularity Award (Theater)	—N/a	Won
1976	MBC Drama Awards	Top Excellence Award, Actress in a Radio Performance	—N/a	Won
1983	MBC Drama Awards	Excellence Award, Actress	The Stars Are My Stars	Won
1995	KBS Drama Awards	Grand Prize (Daesang)	Even if the Wind Blows	Won
1996	32nd Baeksang Arts Awards	Best Actress (TV)	Even if the Wind Blows	Nominated
1996	32nd Baeksang Arts Awards	Most Popular Actress	Even if the Wind Blows	Won
1996	23rd Korea Broadcasting Prizes	Korea Broadcasting Prizes	Talent	Won
1997	33rd Baeksang Arts Awards	Best Actress (TV)	The Most Beautiful Goodbye in the World	Nominated
2002	SBS Drama Awards	Excellence Award, Actress in a One-Act Special	You Are My World	Won
2005	42nd Grand Bell Awards	Best Supporting Actress	Crying Fist	Won
2005	4th Korean Film Awards	Best Supporting Actress	Crying Fist	Nominated
2005	4th Korean Film Awards	Best Supporting Actress	You Are My Sunshine	Nominated
2005	6th Busan Film Critics Awards	Best Supporting Actress	You Are My Sunshine	Won
2005	13th Chunsa Film Art Awards	Best Supporting Actress	You Are My Sunshine	Nominated
2005	26th Blue Dragon Film Awards	Best Supporting Actress	You Are My Sunshine	Nominated
2006	43rd Grand Bell Awards	Best Supporting Actress	You Are My Sunshine	Nominated
2006	2006 KBS Drama Awards	Top Excellence Award, Actress	Goodbye Solo, Famous Princesses	Nominated
2006	7th Women in Film Korea Awards	Best Actress	Cruel Winter Blues	Won
2007	43rd Baeksang Arts Awards	Best Actress	Cruel Winter Blues	Nominated
2007	4th Max Movie Awards	Best Supporting Actress	Cruel Winter Blues	Won
2007	28th Blue Dragon Film Awards	Best Supporting Actress	Cruel Winter Blues	Won
2007	1st Korea Movie Star Awards	Best Supporting Actress	May 18	Won
2007	MBC Entertainment Awards	Top Excellence Award, Actress in a Comedy/Sitcom	Unstoppable High Kick!	Won
2008	2nd Korea Drama Awards	Achievement Award	—N/a	Nominated
2010	31st Blue Dragon Film Awards	Best Supporting Actress	Harmony	Nominated
2010	2010 MBC Drama Awards	Lifetime Achievement Award	It's Me, Grandma	Won
2011	6th Seoul International Drama Awards	Best Actress	It's Me, Grandma	Won
2012	Bo-gwan Order of Cultural Merit	—N/a	—N/a	Recipient
2014	14th Korea World Youth Film Festival	Favorite Actress - Senior Actress	—N/a	Won
2015	10th Max Movie Awards	Best Supporting Actress	Miss Granny	Won
2017	18th Women in Film Korea Awards	Woman in Film of the Year	I Can Speak	Won
2017	6th Korea Film Actors Association Awards	Top Star Awards	I Can Speak	Won
2017	38th Blue Dragon Film Awards	Best Leading Actress	I Can Speak	Won
2017	38th Blue Dragon Film Awards	Popular Star Award	I Can Speak	Won
2017	11th Asia Pacific Screen Awards	Best Actress	I Can Speak	Nominated
2017	1st The Seoul Awards	Best Actress	I Can Speak	Won
2017	37th Korean Association of Film Critics Awards	Best Actress	I Can Speak	Won
2017	17th Director's Cut Awards	Best Actress	I Can Speak	Won
2017	4th Korean Film Producers Association Awards	Best Actress	I Can Speak	Won
2017	Cine 21 Awards	Best Actress	I Can Speak	Won
2018	9th KOFRA Film Awards	Best Actress	I Can Speak	Won
2018	55th Grand Bell Awards	Best Actress	I Can Speak	Won
2018	23rd Chunsa Film Art Awards	Best Actress	I Can Speak	Nominated
2018	27th Buil Film Awards	Best Actress	I Can Speak	Nominated
2018	54th Baeksang Arts Awards	Best Actress	I Can Speak	Won
2022	30th Korea Culture Entertainment Awards	Korea Culture and Entertainment Awards	Na Moon-hee	Won
2023	32nd Buil Film Awards	Best Supporting Actress	Hero	Nominated
2023	59th Grand Bell Awards	Best Supporting Actress	Hero	Nominated

=== State honors ===
List of State Honour(s)
State	Award Ceremony	Year	Honor	Ref.
South Korea	Korean Popular Culture and Arts Awards (Note: Since 2010 Honors are given at the Korean Popular Culture and Arts Awards, arranged by the Korea Creative Content Agency and hosted by the Ministry of Culture, Sports and Tourism.)	2012	Bogwan Order of Cultural Merit (3rd class)	

=== Listicle ===
Name of publisher, year listed, name of listicle, and placement
Publisher	Year	List	Placement	Ref.
KBS	2023	The 50 people who made KBS shine	28th	
