= Mental Coach Jegal =

2022 South Korean television series

- Promotional poster
- Hangul: 멘탈코치 제갈길
- Lit.: Mental Coach Jegal Gil
- RR: Mentalkochi Jegal Gil
- MR: Ment'alk'och'i Chegal Kil
- Genre: Sports drama
- Written by: Kim Ban-di
- Directed by: Son Jeong-hyun
- Starring: Jung Woo; Lee Yoo-mi; Kwon Yul; Park Se-young; Moon Yoo-kang
- Music by: Kim Hyun-jong; Ahn So-young
- Country of origin: South Korea
- Original language: Korean
- No. of episodes: 16

Production
- Executive producers: Jang Jeong-do; Song Jin-seon
- Producers: Moon Seok-hwan; Oh Kwang-hee
- Editor: Kim Mi-kyung
- Running time: 63 minutes
- Production companies: Studio Dragon; Bon Factory

Original release
- Network: tvN
- Release: September 12 – November 2, 2022

Mental Coach Jegal (Korean: 멘탈코치 제갈길) is a 2022 South Korean television series starring Jung Woo in the title role, along with Lee Yoo-mi, Kwon Yul, Park Se-young, and Moon Yoo-kang. It aired on tvN from September 12 to November 1, 2022, every Monday and Tuesday at 22:30 (KST).

== Synopsis ==
A former Taekwondo athlete, who is permanently banned from the national team, becomes a mental coach to help players in slump, heal retired athletes and fight a real match against the absurd world of winner-take-all.

== Cast ==
=== Main ===
- Jung Woo as Jegal Gil, a mental healthcare coach and a former national Taekwondo athlete who quits sports due to an unprecedented scandal.
- Lee Yoo-mi as Cha Ga-eul, a gold medalist short-track speed skater who aims to overcome a slump and to make a comeback.
- Kwon Yul as Gu Tae-man, head of the Human Rights Center of the Sports Council and a former Taekwondo Olympic gold medalist.
- Park Se-young as Park Seung-ha, a psychiatrist from the national sports team's psychological support team.
- Moon Yoo-kang as Lee Mu-gyeol, a leading South Korean swimmer.

=== Supporting ===
- Yoon Joo-sang as Jegal Han-ryang
- Kim Do-yoon as Cha Mu-tae
- Gil Hae-yeon as Shim Bok-ja
- Cha Soon-bae as Dr. Song Ji-man
- Moon Sung-keun as Park Seung-tae
- Kim Jong-tae as Representative Kang
- Lee Jin-yi as Choi Su-ji
- Kang Young-seok as Go Young-to
- Heo Jung-min as Pistol Park (Park Hyun-soo)
- Jung Kang-hee as Oh Bok-tae
- Han Woo-yeol as Yeo Sang-goo
- Heo Jeong-do as Oh Dal-seong
- Park Han-sol as Oh Seon-ah
- Kim Si-eun as Jo Ji-young
- Kim Si-eun as Han Yeo-woon
- Noh Ah-reum as Mo Ah-reum
- Hong Hwa-yeon as Kim Moo-young
- Kim Yoo-jung as Park Ji-soo
- Jung Gyu-soo as Chairman Go
- Lee Chul-min as Park Sang-do
- Park Chul-min as Jeon Chang-gil

=== Extended ===
- Choi Hee-jin as Choi Yeo-jeong
- Yoo Young-jae as a coach
- Lee So-hee as Oh Yeon-ji
- Song Ji-won as Shin Ye-ji
- Cha Seon-hyung as Park Seung-min
- Park Jong-hwi as Oh Jin-tae
- Park Hee-joo
- Lee Seung-min

== Viewership ==
Mental Coach Jegal : South Korea viewers per episode (thousands)

Season	Episode number																Average
Season	1	2	3	4	5	6	7	8	9	10	11	12	13	14	15	16	Average
1	403	536	415	522	435	485	467	512	465	439	362	423	348	399	435	556	450

Source: Audience measurement performed nationwide by Nielsen Korea.

Average TV viewership ratings
Ep.	Original broadcast date	Average audience share (Nielsen Korea)	
Ep.	Original broadcast date	Nationwide	Seoul
1	September 12, 2022	1.53% (12th)	1.601% (9th)
2	September 13, 2022	2.366% (2nd)	1.974% (3rd)
3	September 19, 2022	1.702% (2nd)	1.688% (3rd)
4	September 20, 2022	2.013% (2nd)	1.744% (3rd)
5	September 26, 2022	1.808% (1st)	1.807% (1st)
6	September 27, 2022	2.127% (2nd)	1.976% (2nd)
7	October 3, 2022	1.817% (3rd)	1.751% (4th)
8	October 4, 2022	2.109% (2nd)	2.067% (3rd)
9	October 10, 2022	1.858% (3rd)	1.555% (6th)
10	October 11, 2022	1.702% (2nd)	1.669% (3rd)
11	October 17, 2022	1.410% (5th)	1.324% (5th)
12	October 18, 2022	1.754% (3rd)	1.745% (4th)
13	October 24, 2022	1.455% (3rd)	1.396% (5th)
14	October 25, 2022	1.856% (3rd)	1.554% (4th)
15	October 31, 2022	1.815% (2nd)	1.764% (2nd)
16	November 1, 2022	2.511% (2nd)	2.569% (2nd)
Average		1.865%	1.762%
In the table above, the blue numbers represent the lowest ratings and the red numbers represent the highest ratings.; This series aired on a cable channel/pay TV which normally has a relatively smaller audience compared to free-to-air TV/public broadcasters (KBS, SBS, MBC and EBS).
