= When Romance Meets Destiny =

- Theatrical poster
- Hangul: 광식이 동생 광태
- Hanja: 광식이 同生 광태
- RR: Gwangsigi dongsaeng Gwangtae
- MR: Kwangsigi tongsaeng Kwangt'ae
- Directed by: Kim Hyun-seok
- Written by: Kim Hyun-seok; Park Yeon-seon
- Produced by: Shim Jae-myung; Lee Woo-jung
- Starring: Kim Joo-hyuk; Bong Tae-gyu
- Cinematography: Choi Jin-woong
- Edited by: Shin Mi-kyung
- Music by: Lee Byung-hoon
- Production companies: Myung Films; KD Media
- Distributed by: MK Pictures
- Release date: November 23, 2005 (South Korea)
- Running time: 104 minutes
- Country: South Korea
- Language: Korean
- Box office: US$14,049,623

When Romance Meets Destiny (Korean: 광식이 동생 광태; lit. 'Gwang-sik's Younger Brother Gwang-tae') is a 2005 South Korean romantic comedy about two brothers and their different approaches to love.

== Plot ==
Gwang-sik has never been particularly good at talking to women. While a university student, he fell hard for a woman named Yun-kyung, but circumstances and his lack of nerve prevented him from ever getting close to her, despite the fact that she seemed to be interested in him. Years later Gwang-sik, who now has a small photography studio with his assistant Il-woong, runs into Yun-kyung again. But has anything really changed in him?

Gwang-sik has a younger brother, Gwang-tae. Gwang-tae experiences none of the problems that plague his brother. For him, picking up women is almost an unconscious habit. Getting them into bed is a piece of cake. Disposing of them afterwards is no less simple, excepting the times when they track him down and throw rocks through his window. One day, however, he meets a woman named Kyung-jae who is just a little too smart, too attractive, and too mature for him to handle. Suddenly, he feels just as confused about relationships as his brother Gwang-sik.

== Cast ==
- Kim Joo-hyuk as Yu Gwang-sik
- Bong Tae-gyu as Yu Gwang-tae
- Lee Yo-won as Ko Yun-kyung
- Kim Ah-joong as Lee Kyung-jae
- Jung Kyung-ho as Kim Il-woong
- Kim Hyung-min as Bae Ui-dong
- Kim Il-woong as Kang Myung-chan
- Park Chul-min as bartender
- Lee Dae-yeon as doctor
- Ha Ji-young as Supporting

== Production ==
The earliest mention of the film as a project was August 31, 2004. Originally the director intended Kim Joo-hyuk to be cast in the role of Gwangtae but upon reading the scenario joo hyuk chose to play gwang sik.
