= New Trial (film) =

- Theatrical release poster
- Hangul: 재심
- Hanja: 再審
- RR: Jaesim
- MR: Chaesim
- Directed by: Kim Tae-yoon
- Written by: Kim Tae-yoon
- Produced by: Yoon Ki-ho
- Starring: Jung Woo; Kang Ha-neul; Kim Hae-sook; Lee Dong-hwi; Han Jae-young; Lee Geung-young
- Cinematography: Kim Il-yeon
- Edited by: Kim Sang-bum; Kim Jae-bum
- Music by: Han Jae-kwon
- Production company: Idioplan
- Distributed by: Opus Pictures; CGV Art House
- Release date: February 15, 2017
- Running time: 119 minutes
- Country: South Korea
- Language: Korean
- Box office: US$17.2 million

New Trial (Korean: 재심; RR: Jaesim) is a 2017 South Korean crime drama film written and directed by Kim Tae-yoon. It stars Jung Woo, Kang Ha-neul, and Kim Hae-sook, with Lee Dong-hwi, Han Jae-young, and Lee Geung-young in supporting roles. The film is based on the 2000 Iksan murder case where a teenage boy was falsely accused of the murder of a taxi driver and spends ten years in prison. It was released in South Korea on February 15, 2017.

== Plot ==
The film tells the story of a man whose life was stolen when he was accused of the murder of a taxi driver which he did not commit, and had to confess to the crime as he was abused during police interrogation. 10 years later he seeks help from a lawyer who had financial debts to clear his name.

== Cast ==
- Jung Woo as Lee Joon-young
- Kang Ha-neul as Jo Hyun-woo
- Kim Hae-sook as Soon-im
- Lee Dong-hwi as Mo Chang-hwan
- Han Jae-young as Baek Chul-gi
- Lee Geung-young as Attorney Goo Pil-ho
- Kim So-jin as Kang Hyo-jin
- Min Jin-woong as Oh Jong-hak
- Lee Jung-eun as Oh Mi-ri
- Kim Young-jae as Choi Young-jae
- Sung Do-hyun as Detective Cha
- Yang Hee-myung as Detective Dong
- Park Do-shik as Tae-goo
- Jin Ye-ju as Soo-jung
- Park Chul-min as Team leader Hwang
- Kim Ha-na as Byul-yi
- Choi Jung-hun as Oh Jong-hak's friend
- Ha Sung-kwang as Witness
- Lee Dong-hee as Taxi driver
- Park Hee-jung as Myung-hee

== Awards and nominations ==
Year	Award	Category	Recipient	Result
2017	53rd Baeksang Arts Awards	Best New Actor	Han Jae-young	Nominated
2017	Korean Film Shining Star Awards	Star Award	Kim Hae-sook	Won
2017	1st The Seoul Awards	Best Supporting Actress	Kim So-jin	Nominated
2017	54th Grand Bell Awards	Best New Actor	Min Jin-woong	Nominated
2017	54th Grand Bell Awards	Best Supporting Actress	Kim Hae-sook	Nominated
2017	54th Grand Bell Awards	Best Planning	New Trial	Nominated
2017	38th Blue Dragon Film Awards	Best Supporting Actress	Kim Hae-sook	Nominated
