= Min Jin-woong =

South Korean actor (born 1986)

- Born: August 22, 1986 (age 40); Gyeonggi-do, South Korea
- Education: Korea National University of Arts
- Occupation: Actor
- Years active: 2014–present
- Agent: Studio Santa Claus Entertainment

Korean name
- Hangul: 민진웅
- RR: Min Jinung
- MR: Min Chinung

Min Jin-woong (Korean: 민진웅; born August 22, 1986) is a South Korean actor. He starred in TV series such as Yong-pal (2015) and Drinking Solo (2016) and Memories of the Alhambra . Min gained popularity through his role in KBS' weekend family drama My Father Is Strange (2017).

== Career ==
In 2025, Min acted in the Korean premiere of the British play The Effect, written by Lucy Prebble. Min was triple cast as the character Dr. Toby, starring alongside Yang So-min, and Park Hoon. The play is a story about "love and sorrow" centered on four characters: Connie Hall and Tristan Frey, who are participating in a clinical trial for an antidepressant, and the two doctors supervising the test, Dr. Lorna James and Dr. Toby Seeley. The production was directed by Min Sae-rom, with Park Ji-sun as the screenwriter and Bae Yu-ri as the motion director. The show ran from June 10 to August 31 at the Nol Seo-kyung Square Scone Theater 2.

== Filmography ==
=== Film ===
Year	Title	Role	Notes
2014	Fashion King	Doo-chi	
2015	The Advocate: A Missing Body	Gap-soo	
2015	The Priests	Police replacement	
2016	Dongju: The Portrait of a Poet	Kang Cheo-joong	
2016	Proof of Innocence	Staff sergeant Goo	
2017	New Trial	Oh Jong-hak	
2017	Anarchist from Colony	Hong Jin-yoo	
2019	Mal-Mo-E: The Secret Mission	Min Woo-chul	

=== Television series ===
Year	Title	Role	Ref.
2015	Yong-pal	Lee Sang-Chul	
2016	Mrs. Cop 2	Seok-jin	
2016	Drinking Solo	Min Jin-Woong	
2017	My Father Is Strange	Byun Joon-young	
2017	KBS Drama Special - Buzz Cut's Date	Yoon Si-Woo	
2018–2019	Memories of the Alhambra	Seo Jang-hoon	
2019–2020	Chocolate	Moon Tae-hyun	
2020	Nobody Knows	Lee Jae-hong	
2021	Secret Royal Inspector & Joy	Yook-chil	
2022	Tomorrow	Song Jin-ho (a.k.a. Betamale) Cameo	
2022	Love Is for Suckers	Park Dae-sik	
2023	A Time Called You	Oh Chan-yeong	

== Theater ==
Theater play performance
Year	Title		Role	Theater	Date	Ref.
Year	English	Korean	Role	Theater	Date	Ref.
2022	The Masked Hut Murder Case	가면산장 살인사건	Takayuki			
2024	Angels in America	엔젤스인 아메리카	Belize	LG Signature Hall at LG Arts Center, Seoul	August 6 to September 28	
2025	The Effect	디 이펙트	Dr. Toby	NOL Seogyeong Square Scone 2nd Building	June 10, 2025 to August 31, 2025	
2025	The Effect	디 이펙트	Dr. Toby	NOL Seogyeong Square Scone 2nd Building	July 23 to 26, 2025	

== Awards and nominations ==
Year	Award	Category	Nominated work	Result
2017	2017 Korea Drama Awards	Excellence Award, Actor	My Father Is Strange	Won
2017	54th Grand Bell Awards	Best New Actor	New Trial	Nominated
