= 11 A.M. (film) =

2013 South Korean science fiction film directed by Kim Hyun-seok

- Film poster
- Hangul: 열한시
- RR: Yeolhansi
- MR: Yŏrhansi
- Directed by: Kim Hyun-seok
- Written by: Lee Seung-hwan
- Produced by: Lee Jung-seob; Lee Han-seung
- Starring: Jung Jae-young; Kim Ok-vin; Choi Daniel
- Cinematography: Hwang Ki-seok
- Edited by: Kim Sang-bum; Kim Jae-bum
- Music by: Lee Byung-hoon
- Distributed by: CJ Entertainment
- Release date: November 28, 2013 (South Korea)
- Running time: 99 minutes
- Country: South Korea
- Language: Korean
- Box office: US$5.7 million

11 A.M. (Korean: 열한시; RR: yeolhansi; lit. 'AM 11:00') is a 2013 South Korean science fiction thriller film directed by Kim Hyun-seok, and starring Jung Jae-young, Kim Ok-vin and Choi Daniel. It was released in theaters on November 28, 2013.

== Plot ==
In the not-so distant future, researchers at a deep-sea laboratory have finally invented a time machine. The device can move objects ahead 24 hours, but the scientists have never tried it on people before. Head researcher Woo-seok is promised major funding from a mega-corporation if he completes a test run. Along with his assistant Young-eun, he schedules a jump to 11 a.m. the next day. Upon their successful arrival, they find the base in pandemonium, while the other researchers have disappeared. What's more, someone is out to get them. With the surveillance camera recordings as the sole clue, they must investigate for the next 24 hours the mysterious happenings that occurred at the lab, figure out what happened over the past day and go back in time in order to prevent it.

== Cast ==
- Jung Jae-young as Woo-seok, the brilliant physicist leading the time travel project
- Kim Ok-vin as Young-eun, a cool-headed researcher
  - Kim Sung-kyung as young Young-eun
- Choi Daniel as Ji-wan, a rational physicist who puts more trust into people than technology
- Lee Dae-yeon as Chief Jo
- Park Chul-min as Park Young-shik
- Lee Geon-joo as Kim Moon-soon
- Shin Da-eun as Namgoong Sook
- Oh Kwang-rok as Doctor Seo
