= YMCA Baseball Team =

- Theatrical release poster
- Hangul: YMCA 야구단
- Hanja: YMCA 野球團
- RR: YMCA yagudan
- MR: YMCA yagudan
- Directed by: Kim Hyun-seok
- Written by: Kim Hyun-seok
- Produced by: Shim Jae-myung
- Starring: Song Kang-ho; Kim Hye-soo
- Cinematography: Park Hyeon-cheol
- Edited by: Kim Sang-bum
- Music by: Bang Jun-seok
- Distributed by: Myung Films
- Release date: 10 October 2002 (South Korea)
- Country: South Korea
- Language: Korean
- Box office: US$8.3 million

YMCA Baseball Team (Korean: YMCA 야구단; RR: YMCA yagudan) is a 2002 South Korean comedy film written and directed by Kim Hyun-seok, starring Song Kang-ho and Kim Hye-soo.

In 1905, there was a confluence of international events leading to the loss of Chosŏn Korean sovereignty, and by 1910, Japan formally annexed Korea outright. The Japanese, having already defeated Qing China (1895) and signed an alliance with the United Kingdom (1902), defeated Imperial Russia (1905), and came to an understanding with the United States (the Taft-Katsura Agreement of 1905) to respect each other's colonial "Spheres of Influence" in the Pacific. In these chaotic times, an eclectic group of Koreans find refuge in the quintessentially American pastime.

== Plot ==
The film plays out as a flashback, experienced by a young Korean boy, as he, like his great-great-grandfather prepares to play baseball. The flashback opens with the protagonist of the film, Yi Ho-chang, and his friend in a field. The two are supposed to be studying; however Yi Ho-chang is preoccupied with his soccer ball, which he accidentally kicks into a nearby property. Ho-chang climbs the gate to retrieve his ball, and finds himself within the walls of the American Christian missionary school. There he discovers a much smaller and harder ball, which he comically mistakes for his shrunken soccer ball. At this point a Christian missionary appears and explains to the confused Ho-chang that he is in fact holding a baseball. Ho-chang quickly flees the premise; however his fascination with the new sport ensures his return for further investigation. Ho-chang, accompanied by several interested Koreans return to the school to join the YMCA baseball league. The unlikely group, and their female coach, Min Jung-rim prove to be successful, and quickly become the pride of their town.

Throughout the film Ho-chang falls madly in love with his un-interested female coach, adding to the comic relief. One day while headed to practice the team is confronted by a group of Japanese soldiers, who claim that their practice ground is a new Japanese training camp. To settle the dispute one of the team members, Oh Dae-hyeon, who went to school in Tokyo with the Japanese Officer, suggests a competitive game of baseball. The game would not only settle the dispute, but it would also be a way for the Koreans to establish themselves against Japan, and for the players to further prove themselves to the skeptics of their town. Meanwhile, a more serious dispute is going on between the Korean diplomats and the revolutionary thinkers, over the signing of the Eulsa Treaty that officially made Korea a protectorate of Japan. Coincidentally, Oh Dae-hyeon and Min Jong-rim are members of the Anti-Eulsa League, an organization formed in protest of the Five Eulsa Traitors, which one of their teammate's, Kwang-tae, father belongs to. Due to all of the suppressed tension, the YMCA team loses to the Japanese, also losing their chance to dignify themselves in the face of their suppressors. Devastated over the loss, the team members decide to abandon baseball and return to more practical roles in society. Ho-chang fulfills his fathers wish and takes over the family school, despite his desires to become a great baseball player. In the end, the team reunites for one final and quite dramatic rematch against the Japanese. The Koreans victory in this rematch symbolizes their unity in baseball, and their ability to come together despite the social and cultural issues facing the changing country.

== Cast ==
- Song Kang-ho as Lee Ho-chang, the son of a yangban scholar.
- Kim Hye-soo as Min Jong-rim, the Western educated female coach and teacher at the YMCA school.
- Kim Joo-hyuk as Oh Dae-hyeon, a Japanese educated member of the team.
- Hwang Jung-min as Ryu Kwang-tae, the son of a pro-Japanese official.
- Kazuma Suzuki as Hideo Nomura, the leader of Japanese team.
- Shin Goo as Ho-chang's father, the traditional head of a Confucian school.
- Cho Seung-woo as Young coachman
- Choi Deok-moon as Lee Eun

== Historical references ==
The Japanese general resembles the last Resident-general of Korea, and later Governor-general, Terauchi Masatake.

In the film, there is a funeral service for a close relative of Jung-rim, who was supposed to be related to the late, Queen Min. The relative had committed suicide in protest to the Eulsa Treaty, this is supposed to be Min Yŏnghwan (1861–1905), the military attache of King Kojong.

== See also ==
- Baseball in South Korea
- Glove (film)
- Perfect Game (2011 film)
