= Lee Eun =

South Korean film director (born 1961)

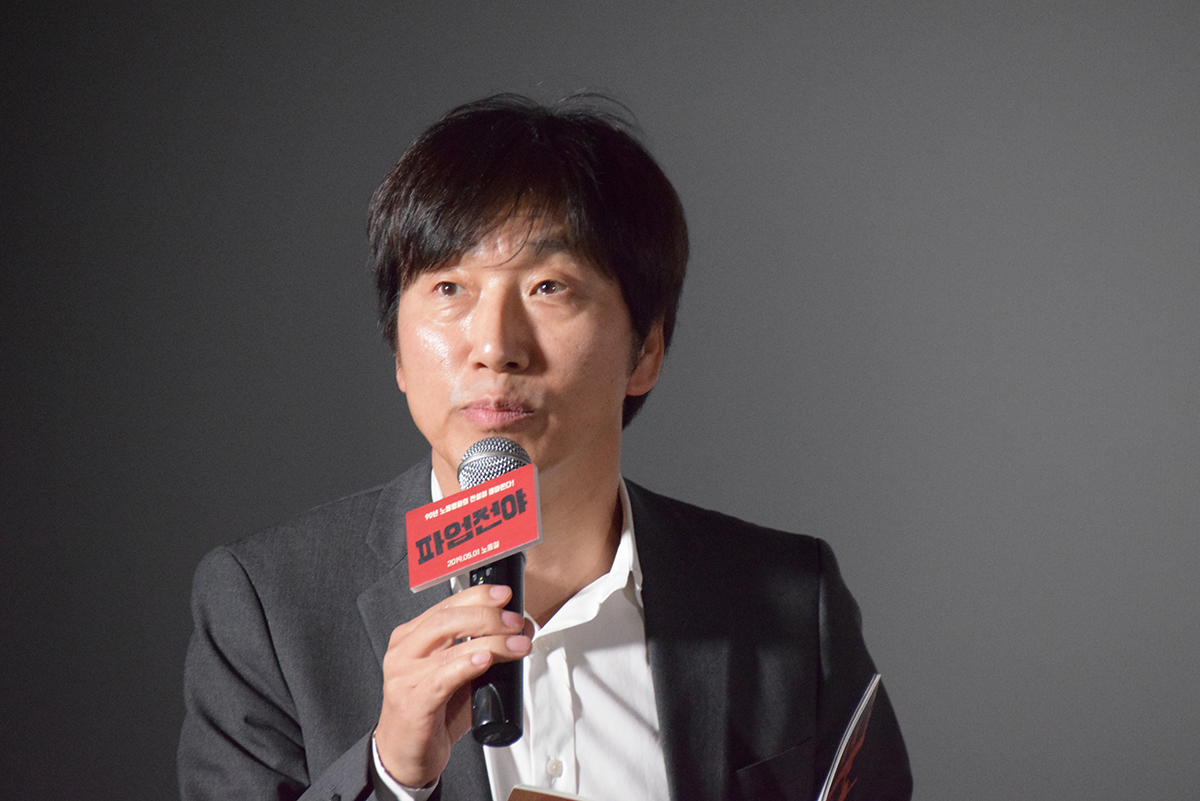
Lee Eun

Lee Eun (Korean: 이은; born July 10, 1961) is a director and producer of films in South Korea.

== Filmography ==
As director

- The Night Before Strike (1990)
- If the Sun Rises in the West (1998)
- Oh! Land of Dream (1989)

As producer

- Hello, Brother (2005)
- Wet Dreams 2 (2005)
- Desire (2002)
- Joint Security Area (2000)
- Happy End (1999)
- The Isle (1999)
- Contact (1997)
- The Night Before of Strike (1990)
