= If the Sun Rises in the West =

- Theatrical poster
- Hangul: 해가 서쪽에서 뜬다면
- Hanja: 해가 西쪽에서 뜬다면
- RR: Haega seojjogeseo tteundamyeon
- MR: Haega sŏtchogesŏ ttŭndamyŏn
- Directed by: Lee Eun
- Written by: Kim Hyun-seok
- Produced by: Hwang Jae-woo
- Starring: Im Chang-jung; Ko So-young
- Cinematography: Byun Hee-sung
- Edited by: Ko Im-pyo
- Music by: Jo Yeong-wook; Kim Gyu-yang
- Production company: Myeong Film Co.
- Distributed by: Il-Sin Investment
- Release date: 19 December 1998
- Running time: 100 minutes
- Country: South Korea
- Language: Korean

If the Sun Rises in the West (Korean: 해가 서쪽에서 뜬다면) is a 1998 South Korean film, and was the commercial directorial debut of Lee Eun.

== Plot ==
Beom-soo is a traffic control officer who aspires to become a baseball umpire. By chance he meets Hyun-joo, a theatre major who crashes her car into a tree while he is on duty. Instead of fining her, Beom-soo gives her driving lessons and they soon become friends, exchanging letters with each other when Hyun-joo returns to university. When they next meet in person Beom-soo declares his love for her, only for Hyun-joo to reject him as she plans to go overseas to study.

Three years later, Beom-soo is making his debut as a professional baseball umpire, and his feelings of love are reignited when he realises that up-and-coming actress Yoo Ha-rin is none other than Hyun-joo. The two are eventually reunited via the baseball field and resume their relationship, though Hyun-joo's affections are also pursued by Ji-min, the president of an advertising company for which she has appeared in a series of commercials. Hyun-joo eventually rejects Ji-min and shows up at the opening game of the Korean Series to throw the first ball, where she kisses Beom-soo in the middle of the field.

== Cast ==
- Im Chang-jung ... Beom-soo
- Ko So-young ... Hyun-joo/Yoo Ha-rin
- Cha Seung-won ... Ji-min
- Nam Hyeon-ju
- Myung Gye-nam
- Kang Chung-sik
- Park Yong-soo
- Yu Hyeong-gwan
- Lee Du-il
- Choi Yong-min
- Lee Beom-soo

== Release ==
If the Sun Rises in the West opened in South Korea on 19 December 1998, and received a total of 145,752 admission in Seoul.

== Critical response ==
Andrew Saroch of Far East Films compared the film favourably to Richard Curtis' Notting Hill, and said, "[If the Sun Rises in the West] accomplishes its modest directives and creates two characters we quickly warm to throughout their moments together. Lee Eun utilises tried-and-tested genre techniques, but it is hard to be too resistant to these when the story moves along so effortlessly." He also praised lead actress Ko So-young, saying that she "illuminates this popularist fable and lends her character some much needed humanity."

== See also ==
- List of baseball films
