= Women's Baseball Association Korea =

Sports governing body in South Korea

The Women's Baseball Association Korea (WBAK; Korean: 한국여자야구연맹) is the governing body for the women's amateur leagues of baseball in South Korea. WBAK was founded in 2007.

== Teams ==
In 2016, 46 amateur women's baseball teams are under the WBAK.

A list of some of the amateur ladies teams under the WBAK:

Team Name (Korean - English)	City	Stadium	Year founded
인천 해머스스톰 - Incheon Hammers Storm	Incheon		2006
경기 플라워즈 - Gyeonggi-do Flowers	Gyeonggi-do		2008
서울 나인빅스 - NineVics	Seoul		2005
대전 레이디스 - Daejeon Ladies	Daejeon		2007
전북 JTCR - Jeonbuk Triple Crown Rudolph	Jeonbuk		2008
광주 스윙 이글스 - Gwangju Swing Eagles	Gwangju		2005
부산 빈 - Busan Bin	Busan		2004
대구 마이티 - Daegu Mighty Royals	Daegu		2005
