= Mugyo-dong =

Neighbourhood in Seoul, South Korea

Coordinates: 37°34′N 126°58′E

- Interactive map of Mugyo-dong
- Country: South Korea

Area
  - Total: 0.03 km^{2} (0.012 sq mi)

Korean name
- Hangul: 무교동
- Hanja: 武橋洞
- RR: Mugyo-dong
- MR: Mugyo-dong

Mugyo-dong (Korean: 무교동) is a legal dong (neighbourhood) of Jung District, Seoul, South Korea. It is governed by its administrative dong, Myeong-dong.

== See also ==
- Administrative divisions of South Korea
