= Kim Hyo-jin =

South Korean actress (born 1984)

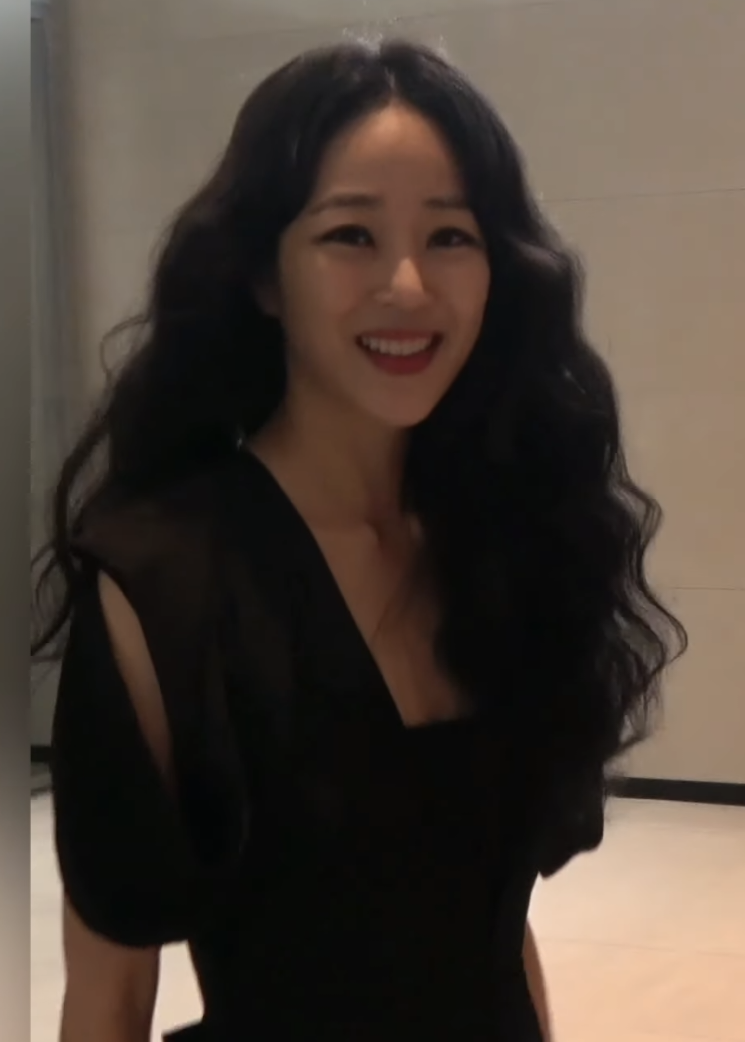
- Kim in October 2020
- Born: February 10, 1984 (age 42); Seoul, South Korea
- Education: Hanyang University (Theater and Film)
- Occupations: Actress; model
- Years active: 1999–present
- Agent: Namoo Actors
- Spouse: Yoo Ji-tae (m. 2011)
- Children: 2

Korean name
- Hangul: 김효진
- Hanja: 金孝珍
- RR: Gim Hyojin
- MR: Kim Hyojin
- Website: namooactors.com

Kim Hyo-jin (Korean: 김효진; born February 10, 1984) is a South Korean actress and model. She began modeling in teen magazines, and made her acting debut in 1999. She made her theater debut in 2009 in the play A Midsummer Night's Dream and followed this up by appearing in the theatrical production Fool for Love a year later. She is best known for playing the youngest of the three sisters in sex comedy film Everybody Has Secrets (2004), a con artist in the television drama Private Lives (2020), and a top star in Castaway Diva (2023).

== Early life and education ==
Kim Hyo-jin was born on February 10, 1984, in Seoul. She attended Ewha Girls' High School. In 2002, she enrolled in Undergraduate School of Hanyang University's Department of Theatre and Film. On February 22, 2007, Kim, who had her Bachelor Degree, delivered a speech representing the other graduates during the graduation ceremony held at Hanyang University in Haengdang-dong, Seongdong District, Seoul. In September 2007, Kim entered Graduate School of Department of Theatre and Film at Hanyang University.

== Career ==
=== Early career ===
Kim began her career as a teen model after being cast at the suggestion of a model agency that happened to see her while she was walking around Dongdaemun. She made her debut as a cover model for the teen magazine Cindy the Perky. After appearing in various commercials and sitcoms, she made her acting debut in the television drama Love Story in 1999. She also made her big-screen debut as Jaunbi in the 2003 film The Millennium.

After a series of forgettable roles, she is best known for playing the youngest of the three sisters in sex comedy film Everybody Has Secrets, and the female lead in family drama I Am Happy.

Though she continues to act in mainstream films and TV dramas such as Mary Stayed Out All Night, in recent years Kim has become more adventurous in her choice of projects. She made her theater debut in the plays A Midsummer Night's Dream, and Fool for Love, then made an acting leap into queer cinema. Kim said portraying a bisexual in Five Senses of Eros (later expanded to In My End Is My Beginning) and a lesbian in Life is Peachy was not a problem for her: "I approached the film in this way: Two people meet and fall in love. And the person that I fall in love with happens to be a woman."

In 2011, Kim replaced Han Chae-young in the Korea-China-Japan joint production Strangers 6, which tells the story of six individuals assigned by the highest level authorities of their respective countries to protect the three countries' joint economic area from being infiltrated by a hostile organization. Filming in Japan was delayed by the 2011 earthquake and tsunami, and the TV series aired on Japan's WOWOW TV and Korea's Channel A in 2012.

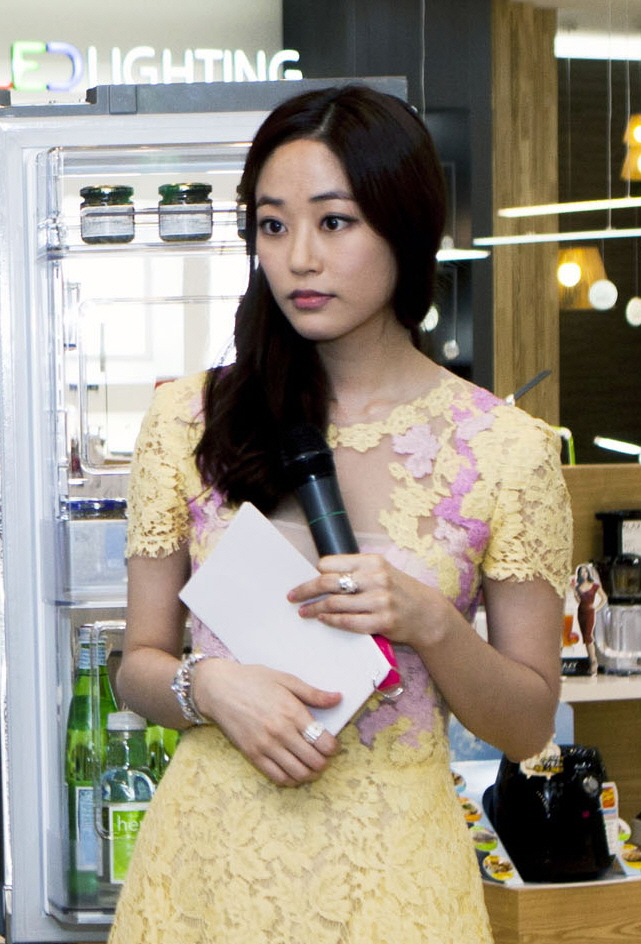
Kim in June 2013

After appearing in Im Sang-soo's erotic suspense drama The Taste of Money, Kim starred opposite Hidetoshi Nishijima in the Korea-Japan joint production Genome Hazard, a film adaptation of Tsukasaki Siro's same-titled sci-fi mystery novel.

=== Comeback after hiatus ===
In 2020, after a long hiatus, she appeared in JTBC's television drama Private Lives, alongside Seohyun and Go Kyung-pyo, as Jeong Bok-gi/Sophia Chung, a former announcer by the name of Jeong Yoon-kyung. She is a woman who uses other people's private lives and become a con woman. It aired on JTBC from October 7 to November 26, 2020 and is available for streaming worldwide on Netflix.

In 2021, Kim acted as Kyung-eun, Jung-soo's (Park Byung-eun) first love, in Lost, a 2021 television series starring Jeon Do-yeon and Ryu Jun-yeol. It was part of "JTBC's Tenth Anniversary Special Project", it was broadcast from September 4 to October 24, 2021 every Saturday and Sunday at 22:30 (KST).

In 2022, Kim acted as Cheon Na-na in Season 2 of The Good Detective. Cheon Na-na is Director of TJ Group born out of wedlock to the group president and treated like an orphan. It aired on JTBC from July 30, 2022 on Saturday and Sunday at 22:30 (KST).

In 2023, Kim act as Yoon Ran-joo, top star and diva in television series Castaway Diva directed by Oh Chung-hwan, written by Park Hye-ryun and Eun Yeol, and starring Park Eun-bin, Chae Jong-hyeop, Cha Hak-yeon and Kim Joo-hun. It premiered on tvN from October 28 to December 3, 2023, and aired every Saturday and Sunday at 21:20 (KST) for 12 episodes. It is also available for streaming on Netflix in selected regions.

== Personal life ==
Kim first met actor-director Yoo Ji-tae in 2003 when they were models for a clothing brand, and their friendship turned into a romantic relationship in 2006. One of the few Korean star couples who openly admitted their dating status, they are very active in charitable organizations, and in 2011 were both appointed as honorary ambassadors for World Vision.

They announced their engagement in August 2011 (Kim reportedly turned down a movie role to prepare for her upcoming nuptials), and subsequently released pre-wedding photos. Their minimalist invitation was made from environmentally friendly paper and had the number 1,825 written on it, the exact amount of the days the two have spent together as a couple. They were married at the Shilla Hotel in Seoul on December 2, 2011. The date marked the couple's fifth anniversary together and was booked by Yoo one year in advance despite landing on a Friday – an unusual day for a wedding. The ceremony was officiated by the president of World Vision Korea; Yoo and Kim then donated a portion of their monetary gifts to the organization to help build an elementary and middle school in Myanmar. The couple have two sons, born on July 5, 2014, and April 15, 2019.

Kim adheres to a vegetarian diet for ethical and health reasons.

== Filmography ==
=== Film ===
Year	Title	Role	Notes	Ref.
2003	The Legend of the Evil Lake	Jaunbi		
2004	Everybody Has Secrets	Han Mi-yeong		
2005	Marrying the Mafia II			
2006	Barefoot Ki-bong	Jeong-won		
2006	Mr. Wacky	Yun So-joo		
2009	Five Senses of Eros	Kang Na-ru	Featured in In My End Is My Beginning	
2009	A Dream Comes True	Lee Ha-na		
2009	Jeon Woo-chi: The Taoist Wizard	Red haired woman	Cameo	
2010	Life is Peachy	Yoon Ji-woo		
2012	The Taste of Money	Yoon Na-mi		
2013	Tummy	Yoon-jung		
2013	In My End Is My Beginning	Kang Na-ru		
2013	Marriage Blue	Joo-young		
2014	Genome Hazard	Kang Ji-won		
2016	Will You Be There?	Irina	Special appearance	

=== Television series ===
Year	Title	Role	Notes	Ref.
1999	Love Story	Hee-jung	episode 13-14	
2000	All About Eve	Jo Cho-jeh		
2000	Great, Great	Won Cho-eun		
2000	Nonstop	Herself		
2000	RNA	Kim Myung-sook		
2000	Golbaengi			
2000	Medical Center	Go Mi-ni		
2001	Wuri's Family	Kang Tae-shil		
2004	Magic	Yoon Dan-young		
2005	Hong Kong Express	Choi Ma-ri		
2005	Ice Girl	Kim So-ryung		
2008	Happiness	Park Seo-yoon		
2010	Marry Me, Mary!	Seo-joon		
2012	Strangers 6	An Ji-hye		
2020	Private Lives	Jung Bok-gi		
2021	Lost	Kyung-eun		
2022	The Good Detective	Cheon Na-na	Season 2	
2023	Castaway Diva	Yoon Ran-joo		
2024	Captivating the King	a courtesan	Special appearance	

=== Music video appearances ===
Year	Song title	Artist
2000	"Tears Inside Me"	Cha Hoseok
2001	"Because I Love You"	Moonchild
2003	"Somehow"	Yun Geon
2005	"Smile Again"	KCM

=== Radio ===
Year	Title	Broadcaster	Role	Notes
2000	Live Music Camp	MBC Radio	MC	Co-hosted with Park Gwang-hyun and Hong Soo-hyun
2011	Love Tree 36.5	On Style	documentary	
2021	Environmental Special	KBS Radio	MC	

== Stage credits ==
=== Musical ===
Musical performance(s)
Year	Title		Role	Theater	Date	Ref.
Year	English	Korean	Role	Theater	Date	Ref.
2009	A Midsummer Night's Dream	한여름밤의 꿈	Yelena	Seoul Arts Center Jayu Theater	June 27–August 2	

=== Theater ===
Theater performance(s)
Year	Title		Role	Theater	Date	Ref.
Year	English	Korean	Role	Theater	Date	Ref.
2010	Fool for Love	풀 포 러브	May	SM Art Hall in Seoul	July 6–September 12	

== Discography ==
=== Soundtrack appearances ===
Year	Song title	Notes
2004	"Bei Mir Bist Du Schoen"	Everybody Has Secrets OST
2004	"(I Love You) For Sentimental Reasons"	Everybody Has Secrets OST
2009	"When You Open Your Eyes" (눈을 뜨면)	A Dream Comes True OST

== Awards ==
Year	Award ceremony	Category	Work	Result
2000	KBS Drama Awards	Female Rookie Award	RNA	Won
2000	SBS Entertainment Awards	Rookie Award in Sitcom Category	Wuri's Family	Won
2004	27th Golden Cinematography Award	New Actress Award	Everybody Has Secrets	Won
2012	7th Asia Model Awards Ceremony	Model Star Award	Kim Hyo-jin	Won
2012	PETA	Achievement Award	Kim Hyo-jin	Won
