= Lim Seul-ong =

South Korean singer and actor (born 1987)

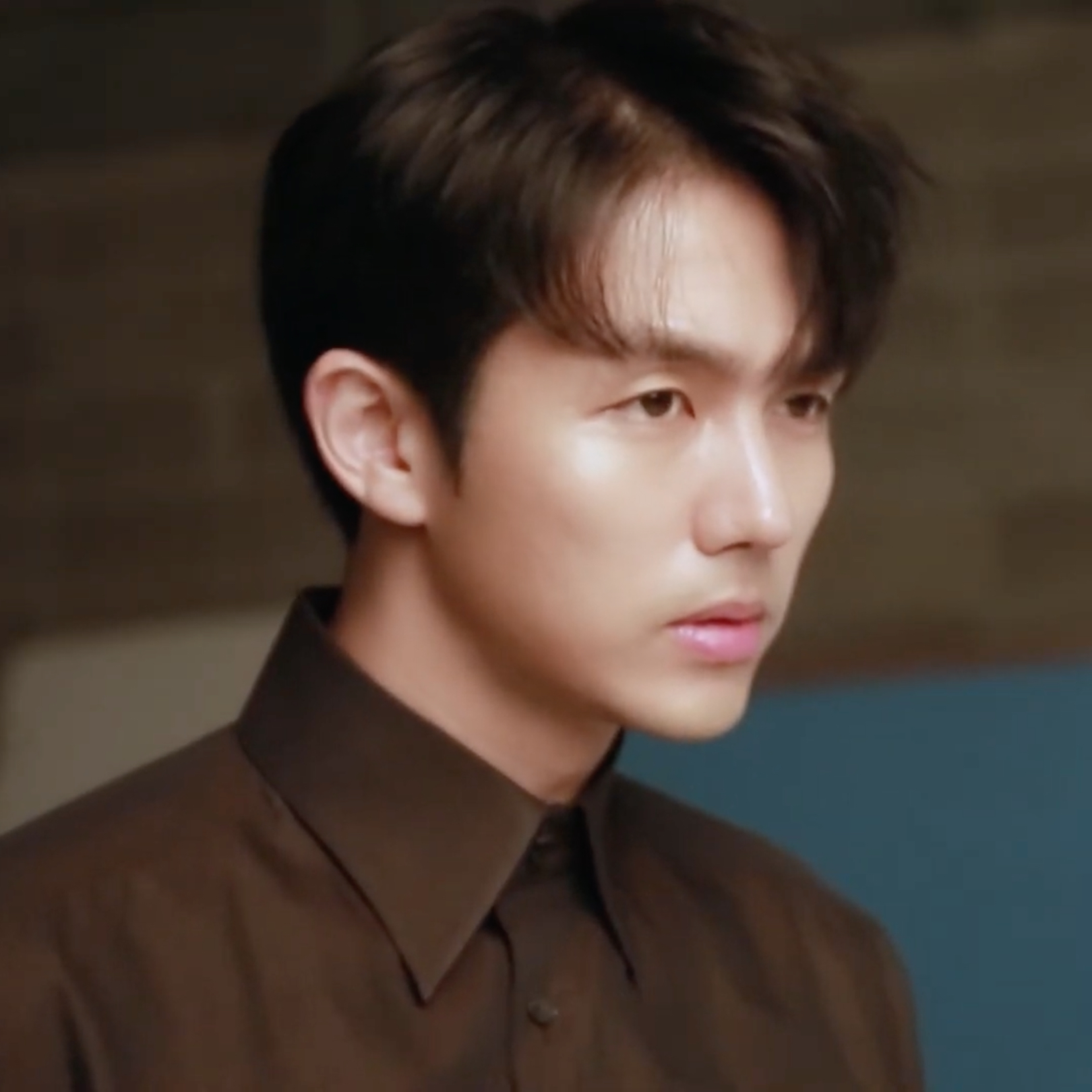
- Lim in 2017
- Born: 11 May 1987 (age 39); Seoul, South Korea
- Education: Daejin University; Kyunghee University
- Occupations: Singer; actor
- Musical career
- Genres: K-pop; ballad
- Instruments: Vocals; piano
- Years active: 2008–present
- Labels: JYP; Big Hit; SidusHQ; Jellyfish; Wake One
- Member of: 2AM

Korean name
- Hangul: 임슬옹
- Hanja: 林瑟雍
- RR: Im Seulong
- MR: Im Sŭrong

Lim Seul-ong (Korean: 임슬옹; born 11 May 1987), also known by the mononym Seulong, is a South Korean singer and actor. He debuted as a singer in 2008 as a member of the K-pop boyband 2AM. He made his acting debut in 2010 in the Korean drama Personal Taste and also had a role in the series Hogu’s Love (2015).

== Early life and education ==
Lim began studying film and acting at Daejin University's Department of Theatre and Visual Arts in 2010. 2AM member Jeong Jinwoon is also an alumnus of the university. Lim later was a student of Kyunghee University Graduate School of Business's Department of Culture & Arts Management while an active member of 2AM.

== Career ==
=== Pre-debut ===
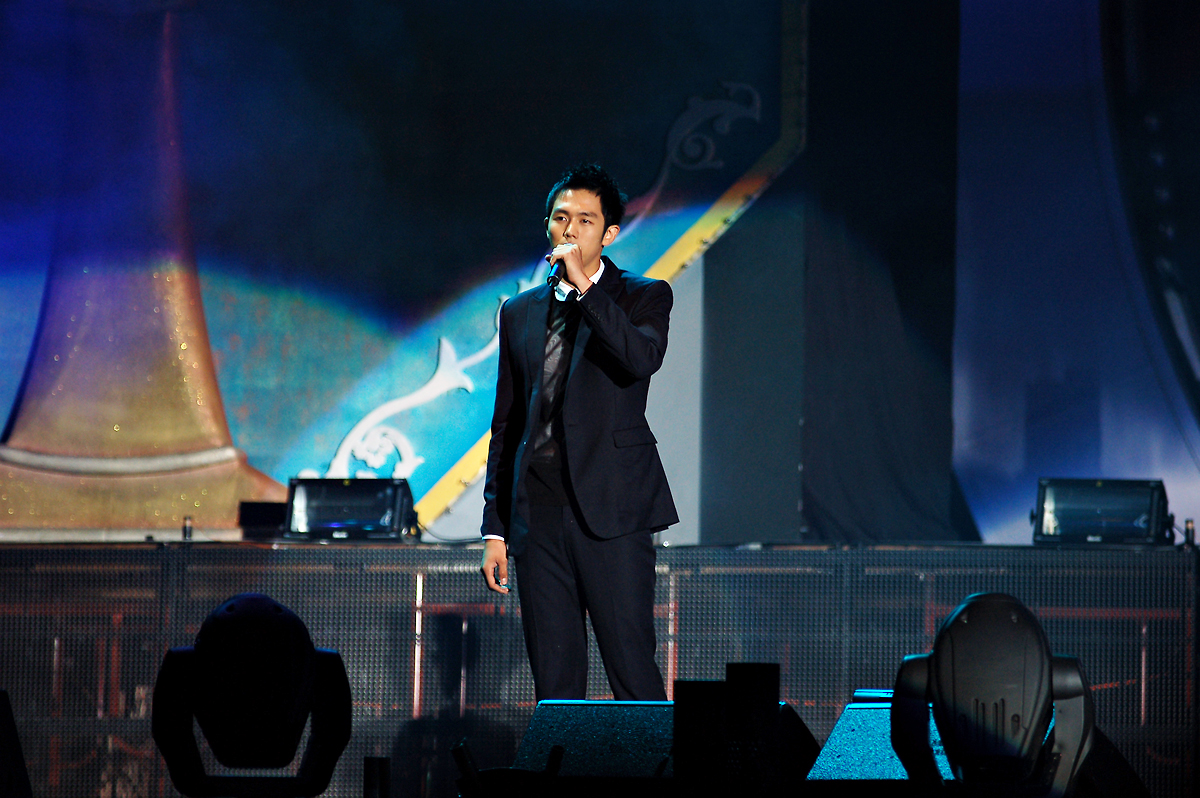
Lim in 2008

In 2008, Seulong took part in Mnet's Hot Blood Men. The program showed the intense physical training that thirteen male trainees had to go through to compete for the opportunity to debut in either a 4-member ballad group or a 7-member dance group under the label JYP Entertainment. After going through several elimination processes, Seulong was chosen to become a member of the 4-member ballad group 2AM, co-managed by JYP Entertainment and Big Hit Entertainment.

In 2009, on SBS's talk show, Night After Night, Seulong revealed that he had turned down an initial offer from his current agency JYP Entertainment (JYPE) to join YG Entertainment, but ended up not being accepted to YG.

=== Debut with 2AM ===
2AM's first single "This Song" was released on 21 July 2008. It debuted on 11 July 2008, performing "이 노래" (This Song). In March 2015, Seulong decided to switch agencies, joining SidusHQ. Fellow 2AM member Jinwoon also signed to another management agency while the remaining members remained with JYP Entertainment. JYP Entertainment assured that the departures did not imply that 2AM was going to be disbanded. However, the scenario has put 2AM on temporary break from any group activities at the moment.

=== Television and collaboration ===
In 2009, Seulong and Jo Kwon were part of "Dirty Eyed Girls" on an episode of 2PM's variety show Wild Bunny, performing a parody of popular Brown Eyed Girls song "Abracadabra". The music video became extremely popular.

In 2010, he collaborated with IU for the song "Nagging" for TV show We Got Married, which reached No.1 on several online music charts. They won an award for "Nagging" on SBS Inkigayo and KBS Music Bank K-Chart respectively. Seulong and Jinwoon make regular appearances as commentators for We Got Married Season II.

While preparing for 2AM's 2013 comeback on 5 March, Seulong was confirmed on 25 February 2013 that he would be one of the emcees for the new season XTM Homme. XTM Homme is Korea's first male style variety show, providing latest fashion trend information and tech news. It is currently in its 5th season. XTM Homme 5.0 was scheduled to broadcast on 15 April 2013.

=== Acting ===
On 31 March 2010, he made his acting debut as a supporting actor in the television drama Personal Taste. He also starred opposite Lee Min-jung in Lunch Box on the single-episode anthology MBC Best Theater, followed by omnibus film, Acoustic. In 2011, he appeared in the sitcom Welcome to the Show, and hosted the music program Inkigayo with Nickhun and Sulli.

In 2012, Seulong was cast in the film 26 Years, in which he played a policeman who wants to assassinate a former president. 26 Years was released through crowdfunding, with 15,000 people contributing to its ₩26 billion (US$23,897,068) budget. For his role in the film, Seulong became the third idol group member to win a rookie award for his or her film debut, following Big Bang's T.O.P and Miss A's Bae Suzy. He won Best New Actor at the opening ceremony of the Marie Claire Film & Music Festival in 2013. He received a nomination at the 49th Baeksang Arts Awards.

In 2013, he took on the role of the Crown Prince in The Fugitive of Joseon, in which a doctor struggles to save his daughter from a terminal illness. Later that year, Seulong and Kim Seul-gi were cast in the leading roles in a remake of the webtoon series Infinite Power. It was released online on Naver and Samsung smart phones.

Seulong was cast in Hotel King (2014), where he played a hotelier with a positive attitude and a loud personality who falls for the hotel heiress.

On 2 January 2015, Seulong's agency announced that he had been confirmed for new tvN's upcoming drama Hogu's Love. He will be acting as lawyer Byun Kang Chul, who has never experienced failure in his life. Byun Kang Chul is a perfect man who grew up in the top 1 percent of Korea. He has been superior since birth to the point where he doesn't need dating skills. "Hogu's Love" is a drama based on the original webtoon series with the same title by writer Yoo Hyun Sook, who wrote the original webtoon series of tvN's Flower Boys Next Door.

Seulong has been cast as the lead for the upcoming movie, Horror Stories 3. Horror Stories is a horror movie series in omnibus format. Horror Stories 3 plays a role as a bridge between the first and second sequels, thus talks about past, present as well as future. The story of the third sequel is delivered in a unique setting borrowing the scientific fiction genre.

In September 2017, Lim returned to Korean cinema with the comedy film The Star Next Door. He played an idol who gets caught up in a scandal with an actress (Han Chae-young) who has a teenage daughter (Jin Ji-hee) that has a crush on him.

=== Music ===
==== 2013: Solo ====
Seulong collaborates with Swedish DJ Avicii for a Korean remake of the hit song "Levels". For the newest version with Seulong, James's vocals are replaced with an autotuned verse in Korean. According to a spokesman for Universal Music Korea, Avicii's agency decided on Seulong for the Korean version "after monitoring various artists because they found his voice the most suitable and beautiful." The single named "Levels with Seulong from 2AM" was released on 9 May 2013. The latest version with Seulong was second place on the Daily Pop Chart of Korea's biggest online music website MelOn's Top 100 Chart.

Seulong teamed up with Epitone Project for a song to close off the summer season, titled "Summer, Night". The song was created in an effort to return the favor, Epitone Project had performed for 2AM when they wrote and composed one of the songs on 2AM's previous album, "One Spring Day". The release of the digital single was on 17 September 2013.

==== 2014: Collaborations and first self-composed song "U Don't Know" ====
In May, Seulong lent his voice for Yoon Jong Shin's "New You" as part of his monthly new single project. A ballad song titled "New You", a song about cherishing the current moment and the present love a couple may have for one another, without thinking about the past or worrying about the future.

On 4 August, Swings teamed up with female soloist G.NA, 2AM's Seulong, and producer/singer Yoon Jong Shin to release Summer Song "Pool Party".

In the same month at the JYP Nation 2014 "One Mic" concerts in Korea, Seulong and 2PM's Ok Taec-yeon performed an unreleased song titled "U Don't Know", which was co-written by both of them, for the first time. The live recording of this song, together with a studio version, was later released in the live album featuring the recording from the concert in November.

==== 2015: "It's cold", "Good Start 2015" Collaborations ====
Singer-songwriter Shim Hyun Bo released his fourth album with a new single "It's Cold" in collaboration with Seulong on 2 February 2015. It is one of two title songs from Shin Hyun Bo's new album.

Mnet "Unpretty Rapstar" released Track 2 "Good Start 2015″ featuring AOA's Jimin and Seulong on 27 February 2015. Within just nine hours of its release, the track reached the top spot on major charts including Mnet, Melon, Daum, Genie, Olleh Music, Bugs, Soribada, Monkey3, Cyworld and Naver Music.

== Ambassador roles ==
Seulong was selected as ambassador for the 2012 Jecheon International Music & Film Festival along with actress Son Eun-seo. In 2012, Seulong and Jinwoon were selected as Brand Ambassadors for Galaxy Note Day held in Busan and Gwangju.

On 15 July 2013, JIMFF announced that Seulong and Korean actress Nam Bo-ra were appointed to be honorary ambassadors for the 9th Jecheon International Music & Film Festival. The festival began on 14 August and continued until 19 August. This is Seulong's second appointment as ambassador for film festival.

== Personal life ==
=== Military enlistment ===
Lim's agency announced that he will begin his mandatory military service on 28 November 2017. Lim entered the third division recruit training centre in Cherowon County of Gangwon Province.

On 6 April 2018 Lim's agency announced that Lim will no longer be an active-duty soldier. Back in 2011, Lim was diagnosed with myofascial pain syndrome, internal disc disruption, facet joint syndrome, irregular chest pain, and chronic pain which are symptoms of '12th rib syndrome' which is a rare disorder that requires continuous medication and he had received treatment up until the enlistment. However, the symptoms have worsened during military training and he was moved from active duty to "reservist" status where he waits for a draft notice to complete his rest of the mandatory duties.

=== Business ===
Lim opened his first bar, Nerd on Earth, in 2016 and second one, Odd Bar, a few months before he was enlisted for the military in November 2017. Both bars feature rooftops and have panoramic views of Itaewon.

=== Car crash ===
At 11:50 p.m. on 1 August 2020, Lim hit a pedestrian while driving an SUV on a road in Eunpyeong District, Seoul. It was reported that the road was slippery due to torrential downpour. According to Korean news outlets, the victim was jaywalking a red pedestrian crossing light. The victim died on the way to the hospital.

== Discography ==
=== Singles ===
Title	Year	Peak chart positions	Sales	Album
Title	Year	KOR	Sales	Album
As lead artist
"7E77 ME, B43Y" (말을 해줘)	2015	—		Normal single album
"Melatonin"	2015	—		Melatonin single album
"That Moment" (그 순간)	2017	—		Non-album single
"You" (너야) (feat. Beenzino)	2017	40	KOR: 49,679	You single album
"Sea of Love" (너의 바다)	2017	—		Non-album singles
"Because I Love You More" (내가 더 많이 널 사랑해서)	2021	—		Non-album singles
Collaborations
"Nagging" (잔소리) (with IU)	2010	1		I U
"How We Feel" (with DJ Clazzi)	2011	54	KOR: 166,486	Clazzi Volume 1 - Infant
"Summer, Night" (여름, 밤) (with Epitone Project)	2013	43	KOR: 82,951	Non-album singles
"New You" (with Yoon Jong-shin)	2014	61		Non-album singles
"U Don't Know" (with Ok Taec-yeon)	2014	—		JYP Nation Korea 2014 'One Mic'
"It's Cold" (차갑다) (with Shim Hyun-bo)	2015	—		Warm
"Good Start 2015" (시작이 좋아 2015) (with Jimin)	2015	2	KOR: 746,517	Unpretty Rapstar Compilation
"On the Way to Love" (뭔가 될 것 같은 날) (with Yoon Hyun-sang)	2016	31		Non-album single
"Always In My Heart" (이별을 배웠어) (with Joy)	2016	10	KOR: 415,364	SM Station Season 1
"Female Friend" (여자사람 친구) (with Kei)	2020	175		Non-album singles
"Separation in the Daytime" (대낮에 한 이별) (with Sunye)	2022	58		Non-album singles
As featured artist
"Levels" (Avicii feat. Seulong)	2013	—		Non-album singles
"God" (Genius Nochang feat. Seulong, Shin Ji-soo, Lovey, Sin Bo-hye, Jeon Hyo-jin)	2015	—		Non-album singles
Soundtrack appearances
"Road of Tears" (눈물길) (with Changmin)	2012	52		Dr. Jin OST
"Destiny" (with Esna)	2012	—		Hogu's Love OST
"Lovely" (Lovely해) (with Bomi)	2015	64		Some Guys, Some Girls OST
"Same Thing"	2015	—		Love Cells 2 OST
"If You Are Love" (그대가 사랑이라면)	2016	—		Mrs. Cop 2 OST
"Finding Differences" (틀린그림찾기) (with Kisum)	2016	34		Uncontrollably Fond OST
"When I Close My Eyes" (눈 감아도 눈을 떠도)	2020	—		Once Again OST
"Let the Star Shine Us Again" (이별이 다시 우릴 비춰주길) (with Lee Sung-kyung)	2024	—		Transit Love 3 OST Part 7
"—" denotes releases that did not chart.

== Filmography ==
=== Film ===
Year	Title	Role	Ref.
2010	Acoustic	Ji-hoo	
2012	26 Years	Kwon Jung-hyuk	
2014	Late Spring	Bicycle lad (cameo)	
2016	Horror Stories 3	Lee Saeng	
2017	The Star Next Door	Yoon Ji Hoon	

=== Television series ===
Year	Title	Role	Ref.
2010	Personal Taste	Kim Tae-hoon	
2010	Lunch Box	Soo-cheol	
2011	Welcome To The Show	Seulong	
2011	Dream High	Firefighter (cameo)	
2013	The Fugitive of Joseon	Crown Prince Lee Ho	
2013	Infinite Power	Jang Seon-jae	
2014	Hotel King	Seon Woo-hyeon	
2015	Hogu's Love	Byeon Kang-cheol	
2016	Mrs. Cop 2	Oh Seung-Il	
2021	The Penthouse: War in Life 3	Doctor (Ep. 13)	
2022	Andante of Love	Lim Joo-hyeong	

=== Web series ===
Year	Title	Role	Ref.
2015	Love Cells 2	Tae-joon	
2017	Let's Eat, Anna	Park Ji-yong	

=== Variety shows ===
Year	Title	Network	Notes	Ref.
2013	Homme 5.0	XTM	Host	
2014	Homme 6.0	XTM	Host	
2016	King of Mask Singer	MBC	Contestant, episodes 87–88	
2017	Duet Song Festival	MBC	Contestant, episode 37	
2017	Dialogue is Necessary	tvN		

=== Web shows ===
Year	Title	Network	Role	Ref.
2021	Double Trouble	Watcha	Contestant	

== Musicals ==
Year	Title	Role	Ref.
2017	Mata Hari	Armand	

== Awards and nominations ==
Year	Award	Category	Nominated work	Result	Ref.
2010	5th Cyworld Digital Music Awards	Song of the Month (June)	"Nagging" (with IU)	Won	
2010	12th Mnet Asian Music Awards	Best Collaboration	"Nagging" (with IU)	Nominated	
2010	2nd Bugs Music Awards	Song of the Year	"Nagging" (with IU)	Nominated	
2010	2nd Bugs Music Awards	Best Duet (Bronze)	"Nagging" (with IU)	Won	
2010	2nd Bugs Music Awards	Best Variety Star	We Got Married	Nominated	
2010	MBC Drama Awards	Best New Actor	Personal Taste	Nominated	
2013	1st Marie Claire Film & Music Festival	Best New Actor	26 Years	Won	
2013	49th Baeksang Arts Awards	Best New Actor	26 Years	Nominated	
2013	34th Blue Dragon Film Awards	Best New Actor	26 Years	Nominated	
2013	KBS Drama Awards	Best New Actor	The Fugitive of Joseon	Nominated	
2015	51st Paeksang Arts Awards	Most Popular Actor (Drama)	Hogu's Love	Nominated	
