= Cross (South Korean TV series) =

2018 South Korean television series

- Promotional poster
- Hangul: 크로스
- RR: Keuroseu
- MR: K'ŭrosŭ
- Genre: Medical; Thriller
- Created by: Studio Dragon (led by Jinnie Choi)
- Written by: Choi Min-seok
- Directed by: Shin Yong-hwi
- Starring: Go Kyung-pyo; Cho Jae-hyun; Jeon So-min
- Country of origin: South Korea
- Original language: Korean
- No. of episodes: 16

Production
- Executive producers: Lee Jang-soo; Choi Tae-young
- Running time: 60 minutes
- Production company: Logos Film

Original release
- Network: tvN
- Release: January 29 – March 20, 2018

Cross (Korean: 크로스; RR: Keuroseu) is a 2018 medical thriller South Korean television series starring Go Kyung-pyo, Cho Jae-hyun, and Jeon So-min. It aired on tvN from January 29 to March 20, 2018, every Monday and Tuesday at 21:30 (KST).

== Synopsis ==
A gifted young man learns medicine out of a desire to avenge his father who was brutally murdered fifteen years ago.

== Cast ==
=== Main ===
- Go Kyung-pyo as Kang In-gyu, a genius first-year resident doctor working in the organ transplant department of Sunrim Hospital who graduated atop of his class all throughout medical school and passed his doctor's licensing exams with a perfect score.
- Cho Jae-hyun as Go Jung-hoon, a world-renowned expert in liver transplants and chief of the organ transplant center.
- Jeon So-min as Go Ji-in, an organ transplant coordinator who is the only daughter of Jung-hoon.
- Jin Yi-han (Note: Credited as Kim Ji-han.) as Lee Joo-hyuk, an organ transplant specialist.
- Yang Jin-sung as Son Yeon-hee, the daughter of the hospital chairman. She is a first-year fellow doctor and a maternity specialist.

=== Supporting ===
- Jang Gwang as Son Young-sik
- Kim Jong-goo as Lee Sang-hoon
- Heo Sung-tae as Kim Hyung-beom
- Yoo Seung-mok as Baek Ji-nam
- Woo Ki-hoon as Lee-dong
- Kim Dae-gon as Jae-hyun
- Woo Hyun as Noh Jong-il
- Kim Ji-eun as Social Services staff
- Seo Woo-jin as Ha Kwan-woo

== Production ==
- The series is formerly known as Cross: God's Gift (크로스: 신의 선물; Keuroseu: Sin-eui Seonmul).
- Go Kyung-pyo and Yang Jin-sung previously worked together in the 2017 TV series Chicago Typewriter.
- The first script reading of the cast was held in late November 2017 at Studio Dragon in Sangam-dong.
- On February 24, 2018, actor Cho Jae-hyun was removed from the TV series following his admission of committing sexual harassment.

== Original soundtrack ==
=== Part 1 ===
Released on February 6, 2018
No.	Title	Lyrics	Music	Artist	Length
1.	"I Swear"	Lee Ha-jin	Dingo	Salt N Paper	04:49
2.	"I Swear" (Inst.)		Dingo		04:49
Total length:					09:38

=== Part 2 ===
Released on February 13, 2018
No.	Title	Lyrics	Music	Artist	Length
1.	"Thousand Times"	Blank	Simon Petren, Maja Keuc	Samuel	03:36
2.	"Thousand Times" (Inst.)		Simon Petren, Maja Keuc		03:36
Total length:					07:12

=== Part 3 ===
Released on February 20, 2018
No.	Title	Lyrics	Music	Artist	Length
1.	"Childhood"	Choi Go-eun	Choi Go-eun	Choi Go-eun	03:45
2.	"Childhood" (Inst.)		Choi Go-eun		03:45
Total length:					07:30

=== Part 4 ===
Released on March 6, 2018
No.	Title	Lyrics	Music	Artist	Length
1.	"Only I'm Alone" (나만 혼자)	Lee Ha-jin	POPKID, Dingo	GB9	03:26
2.	"Only I'm Alone" (Inst.)		POPKID, Dingo		03:27
Total length:					06:53

=== Part 5 ===
Released on March 13, 2018
No.	Title	Lyrics	Music	Artist	Length
1.	"I Want You And I Need You" (원하고 바래요)	minGtion	minGtion, Kim Yeon-seo	Taeha, Ahin (Momoland)	03:20
2.	"I Want You And I Need You" (Inst.)		minGtion, Kim Yeon-seo		03:20
Total length:					06:40

== Viewership ==
Cross : South Korea viewers per episode (thousands)

Season	Episode number																Average
Season	1	2	3	4	5	6	7	8	9	10	11	12	13	14	15	16	Average
1	882	865	1034	1031	930	1129	853	1002	680	745	652	712	591	724	662	847	834

Source: Audience measurement performed nationwide by Nielsen Korea.

Average TV viewership ratings
Ep.	Original broadcast date	Average audience share		
Ep.	Original broadcast date	Nielsen Korea		TNmS
Ep.	Original broadcast date	Nationwide	Seoul	Nationwide
1	January 29, 2018	3.877%	4.601%	3.7%
2	January 30, 2018	3.930%	4.405%	3.9%
3	February 5, 2018	4.493%	5.167%	4.4%
4	February 6, 2018	4.733%	4.999%	4.1%
5	February 12, 2018	4.257%	5.236%	3.6%
6	February 13, 2018	4.575%	5.195%	4.0%
7	February 19, 2018	3.224%	3.650%	3.6%
8	February 20, 2018	4.194%	5.141%	3.6%
9	February 26, 2018	3.224%	3.615%	3.2%
10	February 27, 2018	3.671%	4.244%	3.7%
11	March 5, 2018	3.181%	3.870%	2.9%
12	March 6, 2018	3.421%	4.009%	4.0%
13	March 12, 2018	3.103%	3.833%	2.9%
14	March 13, 2018	3.398%	3.722%	3.5%
15	March 19, 2018	3.292%	3.964%	3.4%
16	March 20, 2018	4.222%	5.034%	4.2%
Average		3.799%	4.417%	3.7%
In the table above, the blue numbers represent the lowest ratings and the red numbers represent the highest ratings.; This series aired on a cable channel/pay TV which normally has a relatively smaller audience compared to free-to-air TV/public broadcasters (KBS, SBS, MBC and EBS).
