= Min Kyu-dong =

South Korean film director, screenwriter and producer

- Born: September 12, 1970 (age 55); Incheon, South Korea
- Education: Seoul National University - Economics; Korean Academy of Film Arts - Filmmaking
- Occupations: Film director, screenwriter, producer
- Years active: 1998-present
- Spouse: Hong Ji-young

Korean name
- Hangul: 민규동
- RR: Min Gyudong
- MR: Min Kyudong

Min Kyu-dong (Korean: 민규동; born September 12, 1970) is a South Korean film director, screenwriter and producer. He made his feature directorial debut in horror film Memento Mori (1999), followed by romantic comedies All for Love (2005) and All About My Wife (2012), queer films Antique (2008) and In My End Is My Beginning (2013), and period drama The Treacherous (2015).

== Career ==
Min Kyu-dong studied economics at Seoul National University, and upon graduation, he entered the Korean Academy of Film Arts (KAFA). In 1999 Min made his first feature Memento Mori, alongside KAFA classmate and co-director Kim Tae-yong. Considered the most influential Korean horror film of the 2000s, Memento Mori has attained a modern-day classic status among Korean cinephiles.

After pursuing further film studies in France, Min returned in 2005 with his sophomore effort and solo directorial debut All for Love. Similar to Robert Altman's Short Cuts and Richard Curtis's Love Actually, Min utilized a large ensemble cast to weave a multitude of stories into a single narrative. About a diverse group of couples and singles who experience love or tragedy in the span of one week in Seoul (the Korean title translates to "The Most Beautiful Week of My Life"), the film was a box office success.

In 2008, Min explored homosexual eroticism in Antique, a screen adaptation of the popular Japanese manga Antique Bakery by Fumi Yoshinaga. The film, about four pretty boys with hidden pasts working in a French pastry shop, was invited to the Berlin International Film Festival.

For his segment in the 2009 omnibus film Five Senses of Eros, Min continued his fascination with queer cinema. Using illusive and phantasmal cinematography, he brought a more experimental and dramatically edgy take on two women involved in a mild S&M relationship after the death of the man they both loved. A feature-length director's cut of In My End Is My Beginning was later screened at the 2009 Busan International Film Festival, then released in theaters in 2013.

Based on the semi-autobiographical TV series by writer Noh Hee-kyung (previously adapted into a novel and a stage play, the Korean title translates to "The Most Beautiful Goodbye/Farewell in the World"), Min confessed that he "cried a lot while writing the screenplay" of The Last Blossom. A moving story of a devoted mother diagnosed with a terminal illness whose family comes together for the first time to give her the support they've always denied her, the film received rave reviews from moviegoers and critics for its delicate depiction of family love.

In 2012, Min wrote and directed a remake of the Argentinean film Un novio para mi mujer ("A Boyfriend for My Wife"), which centers on a timid husband who hires a professional Casanova to seduce his seemingly perfect but fearsome wife. The romantic comedy All About My Wife became Min's biggest commercial hit yet.

Inspired by the Arabian Nights, Min directed the wrap-around sequences that "introduce" each segment by bridging the four short films of omnibus Horror Stories with a tale about a kidnapper who can go to sleep only when he listens to scary stories from his young female victim. Horror Stories was the opening film of the 2012 Puchon International Fantastic Film Festival. For the sequel Horror Stories 2, Min again directed the wrap-around sequences, this time structured around three mysterious insurance claim cases.

In 2015, Min directed the period drama The Treacherous (2015), set during the reign of Joseon king Yeonsan, considered the cruelest tyrant in Korean history. Min said he had always been interested in historical events, and that he wanted to talk about current social issues through them; he also said he wanted to feature Yeonsan from a new perspective by focusing on the relationship between the king and "treacherous subjects who wear the mask of faithfulness."

In 2020, he created the anthology science fiction project SF8.

In 2025, Min helmed the opening and closing ceremonies of the 30th Busan International Film Festival.

== Personal life ==
Min is married to Hong Ji-young, director of The Naked Kitchen.

== Filmography ==
=== Feature film ===
Year	Title	Credited as			Notes	Ref.
Year	Title	Director	Writer	Producer	Notes	Ref.
1999	Memento Mori	Yes	Yes	No		
2005	All for Love	Yes	Yes	No		
2007	The Wonder Years	No	No	Yes		
2008	Antique	Yes	Yes	No		
2009	The Naked Kitchen	No	No	Yes		
2010	Finding Mr. Destiny	No	No	Yes		
2011	The Last Blossom	Yes	Yes	No		
2012	All About My Wife	Yes	Yes	No		
2013	In My End Is My Beginning	Yes	Yes	No		
2015	The Treacherous	Yes	Yes	No		
2018	Herstory	Yes	Yes	No		
2025	The Old Woman with the Knife	Yes	Yes	No		

=== Short film ===
Year	Title	Credited as			Notes	Ref.
Year	Title	Director	Writer	Producer	Notes	Ref.
1996	HerStory	Yes	Yes	No	Also editor and actor	
1997	Seventeen	Yes	No	No		
1997	Free to Fly	Yes	Yes	No		
1998	Wannabe	Assistant director	No	No		
1998	Pale Blue Dot	Yes	Yes	No	Also editor and music	
2004	Twentidentity	Yes	No	No	Segment: "Secrets and Lies"	
2009	Five Senses of Eros	Yes	Yes	No	Segment: "In My End Is My Beginning"	
2012	Horror Stories	Yes	Yes	No	Segment: "Beginning"	
2013	Horror Stories 2	Yes	Yes	No	Segment: "444"	
2016	Horror Stories 3	Yes	Yes	No	Segment: "A Girl from Mars"	

=== Television ===
Year	Title	Credited as		Notes
Year	Title	Creator	Writer	Notes
2020	SF8	Yes	Yes	Episode: "The Prayer"

== Awards and nominations ==
Year	Award	Category	Recipient	Result	Ref.
2000	Baeksang Arts Awards	Best New Director (Note: with Kim Tae-Yong)	Memento Mori	Won	
2001	Fantasporto	International Fantasy Film Award	Memento Mori	Nominated	
2001	Paris Film Festival	Grand Prix	Memento Mori	Nominated	
2001	Slamdance Film Festival	Grand Jury Prize	Memento Mori	Nominated	
2005	Chunsa Film Art Awards	Best Screenplay (Note: with Yu Seong-hyeop)	All for Love	Won	
2005	Chunsa Film Art Awards	Special Jury Prize	All for Love	Won	
2006	43rd Grand Bell Awards	Best Director	All for Love	Nominated	
2006	43rd Grand Bell Awards	Best Screenplay	All for Love	Nominated	
2012	21st Buil Film Awards	Best Screenplay (Note: with Heo Sung-hye)	All About My Wife	Nominated	
2012	33rd Blue Dragon Film Awards	Best Screenplay	All About My Wife	Nominated	
2013	49th Baeksang Arts Awards	Best Director	All About My Wife	Nominated	
2013	49th Baeksang Arts Awards	Best Screenplay	All About My Wife	Nominated	
2018	38th Korean Association of Film Critics Awards	Top 11 Films	Herstory	Won	
2018	39th Blue Dragon Film Awards	Best Director	Herstory	Nominated	
2025	46th Blue Dragon Film Awards	Best Director	The Old Woman with the Knife	Pending	
