= Five Senses of Eros =

- Theatrical poster
- Hangul: 오감도
- Hanja: 五感圖
- RR: Ogamdo
- MR: Ogamdo
- Directed by: Daniel H. Byun; Hur Jin-ho; Yoo Young-sik; Min Kyu-dong; Oh Ki-hwan
- Written by: Daniel H. Byun; Lee Jeong-hwa; Kim Gyeong-mi; Yoo Young-sik; Min Kyu-dong; Oh Ki-hwan
- Produced by: Choi Soon-sik; Kim Won-guk; Min Jin-su
- Starring: Jang Hyuk; Cha Hyun-jung; Kim Kang-woo; Cha Soo-yeon; Kim Soo-ro; Bae Jong-ok; Kim Min-sun; Uhm Jung-hwa; Kim Hyo-jin; Kim Dong-wook; Lee Si-young; Jung Eui-chul; Shin Se-kyung; Song Joong-ki; Lee Sung-min
- Cinematography: Kim Mu-yu; Yun Ji-woon; Go Nak-seon; Kim Byeong-seo; Kim Jun-young; Kim Yeong-heung
- Edited by: Hahm Sung-won; Choi Jae-geun; Seong Su-a
- Music by: Choi Man-sik; Choi Yong-rak; Kim Jun-seong
- Distributed by: Daisy & Cinergy Entertainment
- Release date: July 9, 2009
- Running time: 130 minutes
- Country: South Korea
- Language: Korean
- Box office: US$2.4 million

Five Senses of Eros (Korean: 오감도; RR: Ogamdo) is a 2009 South Korean anthology film with five short films depicting love and desire, but in different styles and genres. The shorts are: His Concern, directed by Daniel H. Byun; I'm Right Here (나, 여기 있어요; Na, yeogi isseoyo), directed by Hur Jin-ho; The 33rd Man (33번째 남자; 33beonjjae namja), directed by Yoo Young-sik; In My End Is My Beginning (끝과 시작; Kkeutgwa sijak), directed by Min Kyu-dong; and Believe in the Moment (순간을 믿어요; Sunganeul mideoyo), directed by Oh Ki-hwan.

The five directors are all graduates of the Korean Academy of Film Arts. The film received 438,501 admissions nationwide.

== His Concern ==
=== Plot ===
A man is attracted by the woman sitting across from him on a train ride to Busan. He gets off the train after her, even though it's not his stop. He gets her phone number. A few days later the man plans to meet the woman for the second time.

=== Credits ===
- Jang Hyuk as Man
- Cha Hyun-jung as Woman
- Director, Screenplay: Daniel H. Byun (also known as Byun Hyuk)
- Cinematography: Kim Mu-yu
- Editing: Hahm Sung-won
- Music: Choi Man-sik
- Production: Culture Cap Media
- Running time: 29 min

== I'm Right Here ==
=== Plot ===
Hye-rim waits for her husband, while hiding, to give him a surprise. Hyeon-woo always worries about his wife being left alone at home. But Hye-rim worries more about Hyeon-woo because he will be left alone soon.

=== Credits ===
- Kim Kang-woo as Kang Hyeon-woo
- Cha Soo-yeon as Ahn Hye-rim
- Director: Hur Jin-ho
- Screenplay: Lee Jeong-hwa, Kim Gyeong-mi
- Cinematography: Yun Ji-woon
- Editing: Choi Jae-geun
- Music: Choi Yong-rak
- Production: Ho Pictures
- Running time: 21 minutes

== The 33rd Man ==
=== Plot ===
On the set of a movie, new actress Mi-jin and senior actress Hwa-ran are having difficulties because of their stubborn and demanding director. The charismatic Hwa-ran transforms Mi-jin into a sexy vixen to seduce Director Bong. Hwa-ran turns out to be a vampire who has turned Mi-jin into a vampire.

=== Credits ===
- Kim Soo-ro as Bong Jan-woon
- Bae Jong-ok as Park Hwa-ran
- Kim Min-sun as Kim Mi-jin
- Director, Screenplay: Yoo Young-sik
- Cinematography: Go Nak-seon
- Editing: Hahm Sung-won
- Music: Choi Man-sik
- Production: Culture Cap Media
- Running time: 25 minutes

== In My End Is My Beginning ==
=== Plot ===
Jung-ha's husband Jae-in has just died in a car accident. She then discovers that he was having an affair with her old high school friend Na-ru. Na-ru comes to Jung-ha and asks to live with her, promising to atone through unconditional devotion.

=== Credits ===
- Uhm Jung-hwa as Lee Jung-ha
- Kim Hyo-jin as Kang Na-ru
- Hwang Jung-min as Min Jae-in
- Director, Screenplay: Min Kyu-dong
- Cinematography: Kim Byeong-seo, Kim Jun-young
- Editing: Seong Su-a
- Music: Kim Jun-seong
- Production: Soo Film
- Running time: 28 minutes

== Believe in the Moment ==
=== Plot ===
Three couples are all high school students and close friends. None of the couples is certain about their relationships, so they decide to swap partners for 24 hours.

=== Credits ===
- Kim Dong-wook as Han Ji-woon
- Lee Si-young as Jung Se-eun
- Jung Eui-chul as Seo Sang-min
- Shin Se-kyung as Shin Su-jeong
- Song Joong-ki as Yu Jae-hyuk
- Lee Sung-min as Lee Yun-jung
- Director, Screenplay: Oh Ki-hwan
- Cinematography: Kim Yeong-heung
- Editing: Hahm Sung-won
- Music: Choi Yong-rak
- Production:
- Running time: 24 minutes

== Feature-length director's cut ==
Min Kyu-dong later expanded his short, and a feature-length director's cut of In My End Is My Beginning was screened at the 2009 Busan International Film Festival, then received a theatrical release in 2013.
