= Love in Contract =

2022 South Korean television series

- Promotional poster
- Hangul: 월수금화목토
- Hanja: 月水金火木土
- Lit.: Mon Wed Fri Tues Thurs Sat
- RR: Wolsugeumhwamokto
- MR: Wŏlsugŭmhwamokt'o
- Genre: Romantic comedy
- Developed by: TVN (planning)
- Written by: Ha Goo-dam
- Directed by: Nam Seong-woo
- Starring: Park Min-young; Go Kyung-pyo; Kim Jae-young
- Music by: Kim Jun-seok (Movie Closer); Jung Se-rin (Movie Closer)
- Country of origin: South Korea
- Original language: Korean
- No. of episodes: 16

Production
- Executive producers: Lee Kyung-seon; Park Sang-cheol (CP)
- Producers: Lee Kang-hyun; Park Se-eun; Kim Da-huin; Yoon Na-hyun; Kwak Yun-soo
- Running time: 60 minutes
- Production companies: CJ ENM; Studio 605

Original release
- Network: TVN
- Release: September 21 – November 10, 2022

Love in Contract (Korean: 월수금화목토) is a 2022 South Korean television series starring Park Min-young, Go Kyung-pyo, and Kim Jae-young. It aired on tvN from September 21 to November 10, 2022, every Wednesday and Thursday at 22:30 (KST).

== Synopsis ==
The series is about the unusual job of a "single life helper", who pretends to be the spouse of single people needing a partner to attend events such as couples' gatherings and reunions.

== Cast and characters ==
=== Main ===
- Park Min-young as Choi Sang-eun / Jamie
  - Oh Eun-seo as child Sang-eun / Jamie
  - Park So-Ye as young Sang-eun / Jamie

An elegant single life helper with thirteen years of career experience with perfect abilities.

- Go Kyung-pyo as Jung Ji-ho
  - Choi Ye-chan as child Ji-ho
  - Lee Ha-min as young Ji-ho

A mysterious man who has a long-term exclusive contract with Sang-eun for Monday, Wednesday, and Friday.

- Kim Jae-young as Kang Hae-jin / Kang Yoo-Jin
  - Kim Ye-sung as child Hae-jin / Yoo-Jin

The youngest son of a chaebol family, a hallyu star who has a new contract with Sang-eun for Tuesday, Thursday, and Saturday.

=== Supporting ===
==== People around Choi Sang-eun ====
- Kang Hyung-suk as Woo Kwang-nam
- Jin Kyung as Yoo Mi-ho / Tiffany Yoo
- Ahn Suk-hwan as Jung Gil-tae
- Kim Dong-hyun as Choi Sang-moo

==== People around Jung Ji-ho ====
- Bae Hae-sun as Kim Seong-mi
- Park Chul-min as a senior manager
- Park Kyung-hye as Kim Yu-mi
- Lee Taek-geun as Park Sang-gu

==== People around Kang Hae-jin ====
- Kim Hyun-mok as Yoo Jung-han
- Jung Seong-ho as Choi Chan-hee
- Oh Ryung as Kang Seon-jin
- Lee Seung-cheol as Kang Jin
- Yang Jung-a as Choi Ran-hee

==== Other ====
- Lee Joo-bin as Jung Ji-eun
  - Yang Seo-Hyun as young Ji-eun

=== Special appearances ===
- Nana as Yu-mi
- Yoon Ye-hee as Sang-eun's mother
- Go Geon-han as Lee Seon-ho
- Lee Seung-guk as a YouTuber

== Production ==
Filming of the series started in May 2022 and continued for five months until October 29.

== Original soundtrack ==
Love in Contract (Original Television Soundtrack)

Compilation album by Various Artist
- Released: November 11, 2022
- Genre: Soundtrack
- Length: 1:41:01
- Languages: Korean; English
- Label: Stone Music Entertainment

No.	Title	Artist	Length
1.	"Real Love" (Pre-release Part 1)	Yuju	3:19
2.	"The Season of You" (Pre-release Part 2)	Byeol Eun	3:57
3.	"Close to You" (Pre-release Part 3)	Seungmin of Stray Kids	3:48
4.	"Carousel" (Pre-release Part 4)	Lee A-young	4:43
5.	"Love in Contract"	Jung Se-rin	2:00
6.	"When I Fall in Love"	Jung Se-rin	3:27
7.	"Marriage Is My Job"	Kim Tae-jin	2:24
8.	"The Last Wedding"	Jung Se-rin	3:09
9.	"Home"	No Yoo-rim	2:45
10.	"Ready to Fight"	Shin You-jin	2:21
11.	"Permeating Each Other"	Jung Se-rin	2:48
12.	"Sang-eun's Cute Excuse"	Lee Se-yeon	1:57
13.	"A Clean Housewarming Party"	Byun Sang-hoo	2:28
14.	"Don't Get Closer, Jamie"	No Yoo-rim	1:42
15.	"Worries"	Park In-hye	3:11
16.	"Rush"	Lee Dong-hoon	1:54
17.	"Ready to Go"	Park In-woo	2:27
18.	"Mysterious Madame"	Shin You-jin	2:25
19.	"Single Life Helper"	Son Seong-rak	2:29
20.	"Secretive Private Life"	Kang Mimi	2:07
21.	"Plop Plop"	Park In-woo, Kim Mun-seong	1:58
22.	"One of a Kind"	Jang Eu-rye	3:06
23.	"Perfect Helper"	Lee Se-yeon	2:12
24.	"Upstairs Neighbor"	No Yoo-rim	1:37
25.	"Leaves Get Hurt, Too"	No Yoo-rim	1:47
26.	"Swag"	Lee Dong-hoon	1:49
27.	"Beauty Idiot"	Sim Hee-jin	1:51
28.	"Kindhearted Man"	Kim Tae-jin	1:39
29.	"The Memory of My First Love"	No Yoo-rim	2:16
30.	"Elegant Figure"	Sim Hee-jin	2:10
31.	"Between The Pitiful and The Flake"	Lee Se-yeon	3:42
32.	"Awkward Couple"	No Yoo-rim	2:08
33.	"Beg Earnestly"	Heo Eun-ji	1:42
34.	"Business, Not Love"	Lee Se-yeon	2:14
35.	"Don't Cross The Line"	No Yoo-rim	2:17
36.	"Intrusive Relationship"	Lee Dong-hoon	2:24
37.	"The Contract"	No Yoo-rim	1:27
38.	"Dubious Plan"	Lee Dong-hoon	1:22
39.	"Lover's Quarrel"	Yae-rin Seo	2:13
40.	"Painful Weakness"	Lee Dong-hoon	2:51
41.	"The Truth Untold"	Lee Dong-hoon	2:55
Total length:			1:41:01

== Viewership ==
Love in Contract : South Korea viewers per episode (thousands)

Season	Episode number															Average
Season	1	2	3	4	5	6	7	8	9	10	11	12	13	14	15	Average
1	919	783	898	853	763	864	658	889	621	698	640	664	669	709	775	693

Source: Audience measurement performed nationwide by Nielsen Korea.

Average TV viewership ratings
Ep.	Original broadcast date	Average audience share (Nielsen Korea)	
Ep.	Original broadcast date	Nationwide	Seoul
1	September 21, 2022	3.992% (2nd)	3.859% (3rd)
2	September 22, 2022	3.447% (2nd)	3.818% (2nd)
3	September 28, 2022	3.761% (2nd)	4.019% (3rd)
4	September 29, 2022	3.584% (2nd)	3.745% (2nd)
5	October 5, 2022	3.007% (3rd)	2.905% (3rd)
6	October 6, 2022	3.539% (2nd)	3.763% (2nd)
7	October 12, 2022	2.859% (3rd)	2.988% (3rd)
8	October 13, 2022	3.633% (2nd)	3.744% (2nd)
9	October 19, 2022	2.679% (3rd)	2.913% (3rd)
10	October 20, 2022	2.833% (1st)	2.800% (2nd)
11	October 26, 2022	2.745% (3rd)	3.241% (3rd)
12	October 27, 2022	2.804% (2nd)	3.082% (3rd)
13	November 2, 2022	2.753% (1st)	2.815% (2nd)
14	November 3, 2022	2.926% (1st)	3.394% (1st)
15	November 9, 2022	3.122% (2nd)	3.338% (2nd)
16	November 10, 2022	3.059% (2nd)	3.131% (2nd)
Average		3.171%	3.347%
In the table above, the blue numbers represent the lowest ratings and the red numbers represent the highest ratings.; This series aired on a cable channel/pay TV which normally has a relatively smaller audience compared to free-to-air TV/public broadcasters (KBS, SBS, MBC, and EBS).
