= Horror Stories 3 =

- Film poster
- Directed by: Baek Seung-bin; Kim Sun; Kim Gok; Min Kyu-dong
- Written by: Baek Seung-bin; Kim Sun; Kim Gok; Min Kyu-dong
- Produced by: Park Ja-myung; Park Sun-hye
- Starring: Kim Su-an; Lim Seul-ong; Park Jeong-min; Hong Eun-hee
- Cinematography: Oh Seung-chul
- Edited by: Son Yeon-ji
- Music by: Koo Ja-wan
- Production companies: Lotte Entertainment; Soo Film
- Release date: June 3, 2016
- Running time: 94 minutes
- Country: South Korea
- Language: Korean

Horror Stories 3 (Korean: 무서운 이야기 3: 화성에서 온 소녀) is a 2016 South Korean film. It is the final sequel of the horror omnibus trilogy Horror Stories which began in 2012. It stars Lee Dae-yeon, Lim Seul-ong, Park Jung-min, Kyung Soo-jin, Hong Eun-hee and the child actress Kim Su-an. The film was released on June 3, 2016.

== Stories ==
=== A Girl from Mars ===
- Plot: A mysterious girl from Mars seeks refuge at a place run by androids. She must explain to them why she is fleeing the humans, and tells some stories about human fear between past, present and future.
- Directed by : Min Kyu-dong
- Original: DJUNA, Min Kyu-dong.
- Cast: Kim Su-an and Cha Ji-yeon

=== The Fox Valley ===
- Directed by: Baek Seung-bin
- Original: DJUNA
- Cast: Lim Seul-ong, Kim Jong-soo, Ji An and Kim Jung-san

=== Road Rage ===
- Director: Kim Seon
- Cast: Park Jeong-min, Kyung Soo-jin and Lee Dae-yeon.

=== Ghost in the Machine ===
- Plot: In the near future, high-tech child-sized humanoid robots are used as domestic babysitters. An outdated, defective 10-year-old robot continues to function beyond its intended use until it experiences a technical malfunction. This malfunction causes the robot to become obsessive and hostile towards anyone who comes between it and its family.
- Director: Kim Gok
- Music: Park young-min
- Cast: Hong Eun-hee, Lee Jae-in and Lomon
