= Frankly Speaking (TV series) =

2024 South Korean television series

- Promotional poster
- Hangul: 비밀은 없어
- Hanja: 祕密은 없어
- Lit.: No Secrets
- RR: Bimireun eopseo
- MR: Pimirŭn ŏpsŏ
- Genre: Comedy; Melodrama
- Written by: Choi Kyung-sun
- Directed by: Jang Ji-yeon
- Starring: Go Kyung-pyo; Kang Han-na
- Music by: Im Ha-young
- Country of origin: South Korea
- Original language: Korean
- No. of episodes: 12

Production
- Executive producers: Kim So-jung (CP); Choi Ji-eun (CP); Song Min-sun; Min Woo-sik
- Producers: Park Seong-hye; Jo Ji-hoon; Kim Geon-hong; Lee Hye-jin
- Cinematography: Shin Jae-man; Lee Joon-heon
- Editor: Kim Min-ji
- Running time: 80 minutes
- Production companies: KeyEast; SLL
- Budget: ₩12.9 billion

Original release
- Network: JTBC
- Release: May 1 – June 6, 2024

Frankly Speaking (Korean: 비밀은 없어) is a 2024 South Korean television series starring Go Kyung-pyo and Kang Han-na. It aired on JTBC from May 1, to June 6, 2024, every Wednesday and Thursday at 20:50 (KST). It is also available for streaming on Netflix in selected regions.

== Synopsis ==
Frankly Speaking tells the melodrama story of Song Ki-baek, a 33-year-old announcer working for Ultra FM who develops a disorder that causes him to speak without thinking, and On Woo-ju, a variety show's writer who is willing to do anything for an entertaining program. Ki-baek's speaking action caused by his disorder catches the attention of Woo-ju who finds it interesting and decides to appear with him on a love variety show.

== Cast and characters ==
=== Main ===
- Go Kyung-pyo as Song Ki-baek

A 33-year-old ultra FM announcer who has lived a single life of image making.

- Kang Han-na as On Woo-ju

An avid entertainment writer.

=== Supporting ===
- Joo Jong-hyuk as Kim Jung-heon

A star entertainer who is Woo-ju's ex-boyfriend and Ki-baek's high school classmate.

==== People around Ki-baek ====
- Shin Jung-geun as Song In-soo

Ki-baek's father.

- Kang Ae-sim as Na Yoo-jung

Ki-baek's mother.

- Hwang Sung-bin as Song Woon-baek

Ki-baek's younger brother. Owner of a local gym.

- Lee Jin-hyuk as Song Poong-baek

Ki-baek's youngest brother.

- Ko Kyu-pil as Yoon Ji-hoo

Ki-baek's friend and a announcer at JBC.

==== People around Woo-ju ====
- Baek Joo-hee as On Bok-ja

Woo-ju's mother. Owner of beauty salon Madame On.

- Kim Sae-byuk as Chaeyeon

Woo-ju's friend, older sister, and co-worker. She is a producer at JBC's entertainment department.

- Lee Soo-mi as Ye Neung-kook-ang

She is a director at the Entertainment department.

- Lee Bom-so-ri as Hayoung

Second writer at Woo-ju's department.

- Lee Min-gu as Lee Min-gu

Sub-writer at Woo-ju's department whom self-proclaimed as right-hand man of Woo-ju.

- Patricia as Sung Yi-na

Youngest writer at Woo-ju's department.

- Park Jae-jun as Jung Gu-won

Abandoned child whom was dropped off at the beauty salon "Madame On".

==== People around Jung-heon ====
- Kim Young-joo as Ma Mi-ra

Jung-heon's mother. Management Headquarters Director at Forever C&C.

- Hong Seo-jun as Kim Young-won

Jung-heon's father. CEO at Forever C&C.

- Kim Ji-in as Choi Yoo-yeong

An influencer.

== Viewership ==
Frankly Speaking : South Korea viewers per episode (thousands)

Season	Episode number											
Season	1	2	3	4	5	6	7	8	9	10	11	12
1	431	442	N/A	363	N/A	N/A	N/A	N/A	N/A	N/A	N/A	N/A

Source: Audience measurement performed nationwide by Nielsen Korea.

Average TV viewership ratings
Ep.	Original broadcast date	Average audience share (Nielsen Korea)	
Ep.	Original broadcast date	Nationwide	Seoul
1	May 1, 2024	1.920% (13th)	1.892% (8th)
2	May 2, 2024	2.022% (10th)	1.938% (9th)
3	May 8, 2024	1.360% (19th)	N/A
4	May 9, 2024	1.622% (15th)	N/A
5	May 15, 2024	1.452% (20th)	N/A
6	May 16, 2024	1.416% (23rd)	N/A
7	May 22, 2024	1.280% (22nd)	N/A
8	May 23, 2024	1.422% (22nd)	N/A
9	May 29, 2024	1.260% (20th)	N/A
10	May 30, 2024	1.204% (24th)	N/A
11	June 5, 2024	1.299% (19th)	N/A
12	June 6, 2024	1.075% (25th)	N/A
Average		1.444%	— (Note: Due to multiple unpublished ratings, the exact average rating is unknown.)
In the table above, the blue numbers represent the lowest ratings and the red numbers represent the highest ratings.; N/A denotes ratings that were not published.; This drama aired on a cable channel/pay TV which normally has a relatively smaller audience compared to free-to-air TV/public broadcasters (KBS, SBS, MBC, and EBS).
