= Ashamed (2010 film) =

2010 film by Kim Soo-hyun

- Hangul: 창피해
- Hanja: 猖披해
- RR: Changpihae
- MR: Ch'angp'ihae
- Directed by: Kim Soo-hyeon
- Written by: Kim Soo-hyeon
- Produced by: Lee Gyeong-hui
- Starring: Kim Hyo-jin; Kim Kkot-bi
- Cinematography: Kim Jin-woo
- Edited by: Lee Yeon-jin; Seo Seung-hyeon
- Music by: Lee Eun-jeong
- Distributed by: Mountain Pictures
- Release dates: October 2010 (Busan International Film Festival); December 8, 2011 (South Korea)
- Running time: 129 minutes
- Country: South Korea
- Language: Korean
- Box office: US$14,466

Ashamed (Korean: 창피해; RR: Changpihae), also known under the international title Life Is Peachy, is a South Korean queer film written and directed by Kim Soo-hyeon. This is Kim's second feature film after 2004's So Cute. Ashamed was released in theaters on December 8, 2011, but had already been making the rounds on the festival circuit. The film had its world premiere in the New Currents section at the 15th Busan International Film Festival and screened in the Panorama section at the 61st Berlin International Film Festival.

== Plot ==
Arts professor Jung Ji-woo (Kim Sang-hyun) is searching for a nude model for a video clip that she will play at her exhibition. When Hee-jin (Seo Hyun-jin), one of her students, recommends Yoon Ji-woo (Kim Hyo-jin) for the job, the three women head to the beach to shoot the video. As they spend time together, Yoon Ji-woo begins to share pieces of her past relationship with Kang Ji-woo (Kim Kkot-bi). The film weaves through the pasts and presents of the three Ji-woos and focuses on their intersecting relationships.

== Cast ==
- Kim Hyo-jin as Yoon Ji-woo
- Kim Kkot-bi as Kang Ji-woo
- Seo Hyun-jin as Hee-jin
- Kim Sang-hyun as Jung Ji-woo
- Choi Min-yong as Detective Min-yong
- Woo Seung-min
- Kim Sun-hyuk
