= Hogu's Love =

2015 South Korean television series

- Promotional poster
- Also known as: Ho-goo's Love; A Pushover's Love; Fool's Love
- Hangul: 호구의 사랑
- RR: Hoguui sarang
- MR: Hoguŭi sarang
- Genre: Romance; Comedy; Melodrama
- Based on: Hogu's Love by Yoo Hyun-sook
- Written by: Yoon Nan-joong
- Directed by: Pyo Min-soo
- Starring: Choi Woo-shik; Uee; Lim Seul-ong; Lee Soo-kyung
- Opening theme: "Kangaroo" by Linus' Blanket
- Country of origin: South Korea
- Original language: Korean
- No. of episodes: 16

Production
- Executive producers: Jinnie Choi; Park Ji-young; Lee Chan-ho; Choi Kyung-sook
- Producers: Lee Jung-hee; Go Dae-jung
- Running time: 60 minutes
- Production companies: MI Co., Ltd.

Original release
- Network: tvN
- Release: February 9 – March 31, 2015

Hogu's Love (Korean: 호구의 사랑) is a 2015 South Korean television series based on the Daum webtoon of the same title by Yoo Hyun-sook. It starred Choi Woo-shik in the title role with Uee, Lim Seul-ong, and Lee Soo-kyung. It aired on tvN from February 9 to March 31, 2015 on Mondays and Tuesdays at 23:00 (KST) for 16 episodes.

== Synopsis ==
Kang Ho-gu has never had a proper girlfriend, with girls constantly taking advantage of his sweet, naive nature by enjoying all the perks of dating then friend zone-ing him. His relationship-savvy twin sister Kang Ho-kyung mocks him and his best friends Kim Tae-hee and Shin Chung-jae for being sorely lacking in any dating skills.

Do Do-hee is an athlete on the Korean national swimming squad, and won the silver medal at the recent Asian Games. Driven and competitive, she's frustrated at never getting first place and is known for cursing a lot.

The timid, bullied Ho-gu had a crush on Do-hee in their teens, when her beauty and sports cred made her the most popular girl in high school. She's the only reason he goes to their high school reunion, and when they meet again, he's surprised to learn that she remembers him. Ho-gu grabs the chance to spend time with the girl of his dreams, not knowing that Do-hee has a secret, that she is pregnant. Do-hee wants to bury this secret because if the story breaks out about her being pregnant, then her life would be destroyed.

== Cast ==
=== Main ===
- Choi Woo-shik as Kang Ho-gu
- Uee as Do Do-hee
- Lim Seul-ong as Byun Kang-chul
- Lee Soo-kyung as Kang Ho-kyung

=== People around Do Do-hee ===
- Choi Deok-moon as So Shi-min

=== People around Kang Ho-gu ===
- Jung Won-joong as Kang Yong-moo
- Park Soon-chun as Kim Ok-ryung
- Choi Jae-hwan as Kim Tae-hee
- Lee Si-eon as Shin Chung-jae

=== People around Byun Kang-chul ===
- Oh Young-shil as Mok Kyung-jin
- Park Ji-il as Byun Kang-se
- Song Ji-in as In Gong-mi

=== Others ===
- Kim Hyun-joon as Noh Kyung-woo
- Seol A as Ji-yoon
- Ha Ji-young as Reporter
- Han Geun-sub
- Oh Hee-joong
- Lee Jin-kwon as Man running away with comic books
- Won Woong-jae
- Ahn Soo-ho
- Shin Young-il as Announcer
- Noh Min-sang
- Kwon Byung-gil
- Lee Yoon-sang
- Jang Tae-min
- Kim Hye-hwa
- Han Yeo-wool
- Moon Jae-young as Director Yang
- Lee Joo-woo as Min-ji
- Lee Do-yeon as Han Sung-sil

=== Special appearances ===
- Lee Sung-min as Oh Sang-sik, customer of manhwa rental shop (ep. 1)
- Jang Young-nam as Pickpocket mom (ep. 2, 6)
- Min Do-hee as High school girl in Yeosu (ep. 2)
- Kang Jun as High school boy in Yeosu (ep. 2)

== Production ==
Director Pyo Min-soo and screenwriter Yoon Nan-joong previously worked together on the tvN series Flower Boy Ramen Shop in 2011. Hogu's Love's original author Yoo Hyun-sook also wrote the webtoon I Steal Peeks at Him Every Day, which was adapted into another tvN series Flower Boys Next Door in 2013.

== Ratings ==
In this table, the blue numbers represent the lowest ratings and the red numbers represent the highest ratings.

Ep.	Original broadcast date	Title	Average audience share
Ep.	Original broadcast date	Title	AGB Nielsen
Ep.	Original broadcast date	Title	Nationwide
1	February 9, 2015	Let's throw trash in the trash bin	1.076%
2	February 10, 2015	Let's give our seat to the pregnant women and nursing mothers	1.262%
3	February 16, 2015	Let's leave the squid in its place	0.780%
4	February 17, 2015	Let's spend Christmas with family	1.270%
5	February 23, 2015	Let's use condo(m)s	0.772%
6	February 24, 2015	Let's not ask about the past	1.326%
7	March 2, 2015	Let's respect one's preferences	0.889%
8	March 3, 2015	Let's abstain from being physically affectionate in front of the house	1.179%
9	March 9, 2015	Stray cats have names too	1.029%
10	March 10, 2015	Let's take good care of our belly button	1.336%
11	March 16, 2015	All babies are everyone's babies	0.840%
12	March 17, 2015	Let's not love the baby's mother	1.175%
13	March 23, 2015	Let's flirt moderately	0.914%
14	March 24, 2015	Ordinary things are best	1.418%
15	March 30, 2015	Let's not hide our face	0.858%
16	March 31, 2015	Let's all cross the red light together	1.405%
Average			1.096%

- This drama airs on a cable channel/pay TV which normally has a relatively smaller audience compared to free-to-air TV/public broadcasters (KBS, SBS, MBC and EBS).
