= It's a Beautiful Day (film) =

- Film poster
- Directed by: Kayoko Asakura
- Written by: Kayoko Asakura
- Produced by: Yukihiko Yamaguchi; Chikako Nakabayashi; Mori Ko
- Starring: Kim Kkot-bi; Nanako Ohata; Akihiro Kitamura; Adam LaFramboise; Julian Curtis
- Cinematography: Toshihiko Kizu
- Edited by: Chieko Suzaki
- Music by: Nobuhiko Morino
- Production company: Booster Project
- Release dates: February 22, 2013 (Yubari Film Festival); June 8, 2013 (Japan)
- Running time: 78 minutes
- Country: Japan
- Language: Japanese
- Budget: 10—15 million yen

It's a Beautiful Day (Japanese: クソすばらしいこの世界) is a 2013 Japanese horror film directed by Kayoko Asakura. It stars Kim Kkot-bi. It is the debut film by Kayoko Asakura and had its premiere at the Yubari Film Festival in 2013. The film is set in California, where A-jung (Kim Kkot-bi) is picked up by her Japanese friend Takako (Amagi Chika). They visit Takako's friends who treat A-jung poorly. That night around a campfire, mysterious supernatural events begin to happen involving Takako's friends.

== Release ==
It's a Beautiful Day premiered at the Yubari Film Festival on February 22, 2013. It received a theatrical release in Japan on June 8, 2013.

== Reception ==
Derek Elley of Film Business Asia gave It's a Beautiful Day a 7/10 rating, opining that the "blackly humorous" film mixed "Japanese splatter with US backwoods horror" to produce "an Asian-American hybrid that's a delirious trip to the outer reaches of the slasher movie." In a review written for Fangoria, Alexandra Heller-Nicholas praised the film, calling the performances "compelling" and going on to say, "the supernatural twist will either win you or lose you, but the film admirably does not stop to see if we're keeping up."
