= In My End Is My Beginning =

- Theatrical release poster
- Hangul: 끝과 시작
- Hanja: 끝과 始作
- RR: Kkeutgwa sijak
- MR: Kkŭtkwa sijak
- Directed by: Min Kyu-dong
- Written by: Min Kyu-dong
- Produced by: Min Ji-soo; Seo Eun-jung
- Starring: Uhm Jung-hwa; Kim Hyo-jin; Hwang Jung-min
- Cinematography: Kim Byeong-seo; Kim Jun-young
- Edited by: Seong Su-a
- Music by: Kim Jun-seong
- Distributed by: Lotte Entertainment
- Release date: April 4, 2013
- Running time: 87 minutes
- Country: South Korea
- Language: Korean
- Box office: US$252,840

In My End Is My Beginning (Korean: 끝과 시작; RR: Kkeutgwa sijak) is a 2013 South Korean romantic drama film starring Uhm Jung-hwa, Kim Hyo-jin, and Hwang Jung-min. It originally appeared as a short film in Five Senses of Eros, a 2009 anthology about sensuality and sexuality. Then, writer-director Min Kyu-dong expanded the short into a feature-length director's cut, which provides a fuller version of the story including "the end" of the relationship not shown in the short. This expanded theatrical version made its world premiere at the 2009 Busan International Film Festival. It was later released in theaters on April 4, 2013.

The title is a quotation from the T. S. Eliot poem East Coker, which is taken in turn from "En ma Fin gît mon Commencement", the saying Mary, Queen of Scots, embroidered on her cloth of estate whilst in prison in England.

== Plot ==
Jung-ha (Uhm Jung-hwa) is left alone and heartbroken after her husband Jae-in (Hwang Jung-min) dies in a car accident. Her grief deepens when she learns after his death that he had been cheating on her with her friend Na-ru (Kim Hyo-jin). As a novelist, Jae-in had been looking for new stimulation to rouse him from his boring routine, and the secrecy and risk of his affair with Na-ru inspired his work. After Jae-in's funeral, Na-ru goes to Jung-ha, begging for forgiveness, saying that she will do anything if only Jung-ha will let her stay at her house. Jung-ha refuses at first, but eventually they begin living together. The strange co-habitation arrangement between Jung-ha and Na-ru and its complicated web of love, hate, lust, and guilt, develops into a lesbian relationship, leading to a new way of life.

== Cast ==
- Uhm Jung-hwa ... Lee Jung-ha
- Kim Hyo-jin ... Kang Na-ru
- Hwang Jung-min ... Min Jae-in
- Lee Hwi-hyang ... Jung-ha's mother
- Kim Kang-woo ... Jung-ha's younger brother
- Jone D. Kim ... one-night stand man
- Choi Min-sik ... doctor (voice cameo)
