= Everybody Has Secrets =

- Everybody Has Secrets movie poster
- Hangul: 누구나 비밀은 있다
- Hanja: 누구나 祕密은 있다
- RR: Nuguna bimireun itda
- MR: Nuguna pimirŭn itta
- Directed by: Jang Hyeon-su
- Written by: Jang Hyeon-su
- Produced by: Jeong Tae-won
- Starring: Lee Byung-hun; Choi Ji-woo; Chu Sang-mi; Kim Hyo-jin
- Cinematography: Kim Yeong-cheol
- Edited by: Kim Sun-min
- Music by: Shim Hyun-jung
- Distributed by: Cinema Service; Taewon Entertainment
- Release date: 30 July 2004
- Running time: 105 minutes
- Country: South Korea
- Language: Korean

Everybody Has Secrets (Korean: 누구나 비밀은 있다) is a 2004 South Korean romantic comedy film. It has some similarities with the film About Adam. The film stars Lee Byung-hun, Choi Ji-woo, Kim Hyo-jin and Chu Sang-mi. Because it has several sex-scenes, it is generally restricted to viewers under 18 or 21. Although the film wasn't a particularly big hit in South Korea, it grossed $4,888,679 in Japan.

== Synopsis ==
Han Mi-yeong meets Choi Su-hyeon and falls in love with him. However, unknown to her, he also begins to seduce her two sisters Han Seon-yeong and Han Ji-yeong. The two sisters are captivated by him and are unable to resist him.

== Cast ==
- Lee Byung-hun as Choi Su-hyeon
- Choi Ji-woo as Han Seon-yeong
- Chu Sang-mi as Han Ji-yeong
- Kim Hyo-jin as Han Mi-yeong
- Sunwoo Yong-nyeo as Mother
- Shin Yi as Woman who is about to break up
- Kim Hye-gon as Ji-yeong's husband
- Jeon Jae-hyeong as Han Dae-yeong
- Tak Jae-hoon as Sang-il

== Awards and nominations ==
2004 Blue Dragon Film Awards

- Nomination - Best Supporting Actress - Chu Sang-mi
- Nomination - Best New Actress - Kim Hyo-jin

2005 Grand Bell Awards

- Nomination - Best Adapted Screenplay - KIM Hee-Jae

2004 Korean Film Awards

- Nomination - Best New Actress - Kim Hyo-jin
