= Genome Hazard =

- International poster
- Directed by: Kim Sung-soo
- Written by: Kim Sung-soo
- Based on: Genome Hazard by Shiro Tsukasaki
- Produced by: Hidemi Satani; Lee Geun-wook; Yang Gwang-deok; Cha Won-cheon
- Starring: Hidetoshi Nishijima; Kim Hyo-jin
- Cinematography: Choi Sang-muk
- Edited by: Park Gyeong-suk
- Music by: Kenji Kawai
- Production companies: Lotte Entertainment; Sovik Global Contents Investment Fund; Happinet
- Distributed by: Happinet (Japan); Lotte Entertainment (South Korea)
- Release dates: October 4, 2013 (Busan International Film Festival); January 24, 2014 (Japan); May 29, 2014 (South Korea)
- Running time: 120 minutes
- Countries: Japan; South Korea
- Languages: Japanese; Korean
- Box office: US$1,086,459

Genome Hazard (ゲノムハザード ある天才科学者の5日間) (Korean: 무명인; RR: Mumyeongin; lit. 'Nameless') is a 2013 Japanese-South Korean action thriller film directed by Kim Sung-soo based on a novel by Shiro Tsukasaki. In 2014, the film was released theatrically in Japan on January 24, and South Korea on May 29.

== Cast ==
- Hidetoshi Nishijima as Ishigami Taketo
- Kim Hyo-jin as Kang Ji-won
- Yōko Maki as Miyuki
- Yuri Nakamura as Han Yu-ri
- Manabu Hamada as Ibuki
- Masatō Ibu as Dr. Sato
- Lee Geung-young
- Nahana as Koyoko
- Park Hae-joon as Kurosaki

== Reception ==
The film grossed ¥49.3 million (US$479,000) at the Japanese box office.

Choi Sang-muk won the Bronze Medal for Cinematography at the 2014 Golden Cinema Festival.
