= Kim Kkot-bi =

South Korean actress (born 1985)

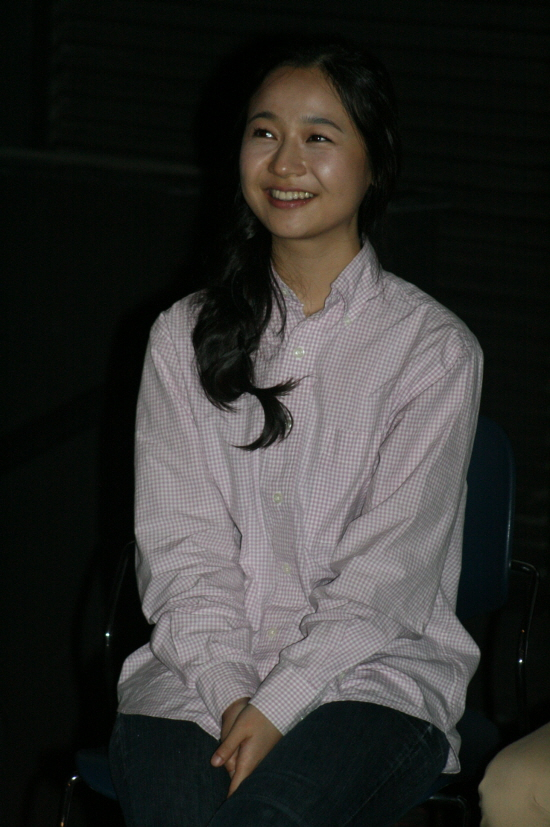
- Kim in May 2010
- Born: November 24, 1985 (age 40); Bucheon, South Korea
- Other name: Kim Kkobbi
- Education: Sangmyung University; Theater and Film
- Occupation: Actress
- Years active: 2002–present

Korean name
- Hangul: 김꽃비
- RR: Gim Kkotbi
- MR: Kim Kkotpi

Kim Kkobbi (Korean: 김꽃비; born November 24, 1985) is a South Korean actress. The syllables of her given name literally mean "flower" and "rain".

== Career ==
Kim Kkobbi was working as an extra on the 2001 film My Boss, My Hero when a staffer spotted her and asked her to audition for Jealousy Is My Middle Name. Thus began her acting career, though for many years she was relegated to bit parts. Instead she focused on gaining experience in the indie film scene.

Kim had her breakthrough in 2009 when she starred opposite actor-director Yang Ik-june in the gritty, low-budget drama Breathless. The film won critical acclaim both at home and abroad, receiving more than 20 awards from the international festival circuit, and attracting audiences to theaters in numbers unprecedented for an indie film. Kim was widely praised for her portrayal of a spunky high school girl with an abusive past who bonds with a neighborhood thug, earning her a Best Actress award from the Las Palmas de Gran Canaria International Film Festival, Best New Actress honors from the Blue Dragon Film Awards and Grand Bell Awards, and a Best Supporting Actress nomination from the Asian Film Awards.

Kim's other notable films include the vacation island mystery Magic and Loss, the lesbian romance Ashamed (also known as Life is Peachy), the dark and violent animated film The King of Pigs, and Myselves: The Actress No Make-Up Project, for which she and two other indie actresses filmed themselves using camcorders to document their lives, struggles and dreams. In 2014 she played the leading role in the Japanese horror film A Record of Sweet Murder.

== Filmography ==
Year	Title	Role	Notes/Ref.
2001	My Boss, My Hero		
2002	Saving My Hubby		
2003	Jealousy Is My Middle Name	Han Mi-rim, editor's daughter	
2005	My Boyfriend Is Type B	High school student 2	
2005	This Charming Girl	young Jeong-hae	
2005	Blossom Again	Female student at private institute 2	
2005	Bystanders: Diary of June	young Yoon-hee	
2005	Friendly and Harmonious	So-yeon	
2006	Family Ties	Regular student customer at food stall 1	
2006	The City of Violence	Razor-wielding high school girl	
2006	Midnight Ballad for Ghost Theater	So-dan/Bottom four	also credited as sound department crew
2006	Not a Girl	Yoon-mi	short film
2008	The Pit and the Pendulum	Woman at the fruit farm	
2008	Close to You		short film
2008	The Hole		short film
2009	Why Did You Come to My House?	Sister-in-law 3	
2009	Breathless	Yeon-hee	
2009	A Green Goodbye: She & Her Mobile	Girl	
2010	Now I'll Be Brave	Kim Kkobbi	
2010	Ghost (Be With Me)	Nam-hee	segment: "Tarot 2. Attached"
2010	Magic and Loss		
2010	Handstand in Space		short film
2011	Where the Lights Shine Low		short film
2011	Be My Guest	Daughter	
2011	The House	Ga-yeong (voice)	animated film
2011	The King of Pigs	young Jung Jong-suk/ noraebang employee (voice)	animated film
2011	Is There Anybody Out There?	Woman	short film
2011	TV Literature "Blazing Sonata"	Jo Ye-ri	television (KBS1)
2011	Life is Peachy	Kang Ji-woo	
2012	Myselves: The Actress No Make-Up Project	Herself	Documentary; also credited as director, screenwriter and cinematographer
2012	The Time Vanished		short film
2013	The Sunshine Boys	Mi-yeon	
2013	Jury	Audience member 1	
2013	It's a Beautiful Day	Ah-joong	
2013	A Pale Woman	Kim	
2013	Pluto	Jung Soo-jin	
2013	Rough Play	Jeonju International Film Festival VIP	
2014	Kundo: Age of the Rampant	Jung-shim	
2014	Taste in Guys		short film
2014	A Record of Sweet Murder	Journalist Kim So-yeon	
2014	A Dangerous Woman	Bo-kyung	short film
2015	In the Room	Seo Yun	Singaporean film
2022	Love Camping		Directed

== Theater ==
Year	Title	Role
1997	Cape Nino	
2002	Beautiful Sign	

== Awards and nominations ==
Year	Award	Category	Nominated work	Result
2002	Youth Performing Arts Festival	Best Actress	Beautiful Sign	Won
2009	10th Las Palmas de Gran Canaria International Film Festival	Best Actress	Breathless	Won
2009	2nd Korea Junior Star Awards	Best Newcomer, Movie category	Breathless	Won
2009	7th Pan Pacific Film Festival	Best Actress	Breathless	Won
2009	46th Grand Bell Awards	Best New Actress	Breathless	Won
2009	30th Blue Dragon Film Awards	Best New Actress	Breathless	Won
2010	4th Asian Film Awards	Best Supporting Actress	Breathless	Nominated
2010	46th Baeksang Arts Awards	Best New Actress	Breathless	Nominated
