= Private Lives (TV series) =

2020 South Korean television series

- Promotional poster
- Hangul: 사생활
- Hanja: 私生活
- RR: Sasaenghwal
- MR: Sasaenghwal
- Genre: Drama; Crime; Romance
- Created by: JTBC Studios; Production plan
- Written by: Yoo Sung-yeol
- Directed by: Nam Jun hyuk
- Starring: Seohyun; Go Kyung-pyo; Kim Hyo-jin; Kim Young-min; Tae Won-seok
- Music by: Kim Jun-seok
- Country of origin: South Korea
- Original language: Korean
- No. of episodes: 16

Production
- Executive producers: Kim U-no; Jo Joon-hyung
- Producer: Lee Seung-hee
- Running time: 70 minutes
- Production company: Doremi Entertainment

Original release
- Network: JTBC
- Release: October 7 – November 26, 2020

Private Lives (Korean: 사생활; RR: Sasaenghwal) is a South Korean television series starring Seohyun, Go Kyung-pyo, Kim Hyo-jin, Kim Young-min, and Tae Won-seok. It aired on JTBC from October 7 to November 26, 2020 and is available for streaming worldwide on Netflix.

== Synopsis ==
The drama revolves around a group of swindlers who stumbles upon secret information that could harm the nation. Using their skills and conning techniques, they go up against a huge conglomerate to reveal a major "private life".

== Cast ==
=== Main ===
- Seohyun as Cha Joo-eun

A 29-year-old veteran swindler who doesn't like a hard and nasty life. She is a woman who manipulates her own private life. Since her school days, she has contributed greatly to her family business as a life-type swindler.

- Go Kyung-pyo as Lee Jung-hwan

GK Technology Development Team 2's Team Manager. He is a man who threw his private life among crooks to live. He actually runs a detective agency named Spy Detective Agency. Unaware of Joo-eun's private life, Jung-hwan asks her to marry him with a trembling heart, and the marriage of the two goes in a flurry.

- Kim Hyo-jin as Jeong Bok-gi/Sophia Chung

A former announcer by the name of Jeong Yoon-kyung. She is a woman who uses other people's private lives. When everyone in her country tried to kill her, only Jae-wook reached out a helping hand. She was reborn as a swindler conqueror by holding hand with Jae-wook

- Kim Young-min as Kim Jae-wook/Edward Kim

A swindler from GK Technology. He is a man who tramples on other people's private lives.

=== Supporting ===
==== People around Cha Joo-eun ====
- Park Sung-geun as Cha Hyun-tae, Joo-eun's father
- Song Seon-mi as Kim Mi-sook, Joo-eun's mother
- Tae Won-seok as Hanson, Joo-eun's mentor. He was once a boxer and a gangster. He is Mi-sook and Joo-eun's fraud partner.
- Jang Jin-hee as Jang Min-jung, Joo-eun's best friend who she met at Cheongpa Women's Prison. Min-jung used to run an illegal gambling place for women in Hwaryu.
- Yoo Hee-je as Park Tae-joo
- Yoon Sa-bong as Yang In-sook, retired police officer who has a soft spot for Joo-eun
- Kim Seo-won as President Nam

==== People around Lee Jung-hwan ====
- Kim Min-sang as Kim Sang-man, director of Strategic Planning at GK Technology
- Kim Ba-da as Woo Seok-ho, team leader of GK Electronics Strategic Planning Division 2
- Jang Won-hyuk as Choi Yoon-seok/Choi Min-seok, a genius hacker who works at a local computer repair shop called PC Graveyard
- Song Sang-eun as Go Hye-won, manager of the Spy Detective Agency

==== Police ====
- Lee Hak-joo as Kim Myung-hyun
- Park Sung-hoon as Jung Dae-sang
- Lee Yun-seol as Kang Soo-jin
- Yoon Jung-hoon as Park Kyung-seop
- Kwak Min-ho as Lee Min-kyu

=== Others ===
- Cha Soo-yeon as Oh Hyun-kyung, a lawyer at O&S Law Office
- Ha Young as Yoo Mi-young
- Min Ji-oh as Yoo Byeong-joon
- Lee Jae-eun as Ottu Restaurant employee
- Kong Yoo-seok as Jeong Bok-gi's chauffeur

=== Special appearances ===
- Han Kyu-won as Chief Park Jin-woo (Ep. 1-2)
- Kim Kang-il as criminal making deal (Ep. 1)
- Yoo Young-bok as Lee Jung-hwan's father (Ep. 2)
- Kim Joo-ah as Lee Jung-hwan's mother (Ep. 2)

== Production ==
The series marks Go Kyung-pyo's first acting role since his military discharge in January 2020 as well as Kim Hyo-jin's small screen comeback after 8 years.

The first script reading took place in April 2020 at JTBC Building in Sangam-dong, Seoul, South Korea.

The series was originally scheduled to premiere on September 16, 2020 but it was postponed to October 7 due to the COVID-19 pandemic.

== Original soundtrack ==
Private Lives OST

Soundtrack album by Various Artists
- Released: 2020
- Genre: Soundtrack
- Languages: Korean; English

=== Part 1 ===
Released on October 7, 2020
No.	Title	Lyrics	Music	Artist	Length
1.	"Things to Love" (푸른안개 (Note: Lit. "Blue Fog"))	Taibian	Park Sung-il	6band	3:18
2.	"Things to Love" (Inst.)		Park Sung-il		3:18
Total length:					6:36

=== Part 2 ===
Released on October 14, 2020
No.	Title	Lyrics	Music	Artist	Length
1.	"The Most Ordinary Day" (보통의 꿈 (Note: Lit. "The Ordinary Dream"))	Lee Chi-hoon	Park Sung-il	Yangpa	4:06
2.	"The Most Ordinary Day" (Inst.)		Park Sung-il		4:06
Total length:					8:12

=== Part 3 ===
Released on October 21, 2020
No.	Title	Lyrics	Music	Artist	Length
1.	"Private Lives" (사생활 (Note: Lit. "Private Lives"))	Kim Ki-won	Kim Joonseok, Kang Mimi	Minju	3:49
2.	"Private Lives" (Inst.)		Kim Joonseok, Kang Mimi		3:49
Total length:					7:38

=== Part 4 ===
Released on October 22, 2020
No.	Title	Lyrics	Music	Artist	Length
1.	"Beautiful Dream"	Jamie K. Lee	Kim Joonseok, Kang Mimi	Mew	4:07
2.	"Beautiful Dream" (Inst.)		Kim Joonseok, Kang Mimi		4:07
Total length:					8:14

=== Part 5 ===
Released on October 28, 2020
No.	Title	Lyrics	Music	Artist	Length
1.	"Things To Love" (우리가 사랑해야 하는 것들)	Seo Dong-seong	Park Seong-il	Kim Jae-joong	3:24
2.	"Things To Love" (Inst.)		Park Seong-il		3:24

== Ratings ==
Private Lives : South Korea viewers per episode (thousands)

Season	Episode number																Average
Season	1	2	3	4	5	6	7	8	9	10	11	12	13	14	15	16	Average
1	592	587	N/A	N/A	N/A	N/A	TBD	TBD	TBD	TBD	TBD	TBD	TBD	TBD	TBD	TBD	TBD

Source: Audience measurement performed nationwide by Nielsen Korea.

Average TV viewership ratings
Ep.	Original broadcast date	Average audience share (Nielsen Korea)	
Ep.	Original broadcast date	Nationwide	Seoul
1	October 7, 2020	2.522%	2.816%
2	October 8, 2020	2.235%	—N/a
3	October 14, 2020	2.030%	—N/a
4	October 15, 2020	1.952%	—N/a
5	October 21, 2020	1.721%	—N/a
6	October 22, 2020	1.491%	—N/a
7	October 28, 2020	1.592%	—N/a
8	October 29, 2020	1.970%	—N/a
9	November 4, 2020	1.609%	—N/a
10	November 5, 2020	1.487%	—N/a
11	November 11, 2020	1.505%	—N/a
12	November 12, 2020	1.913%	—N/a
13	November 18, 2020	1.669%	—N/a
14	November 19, 2020	1.608%	—N/a
15	November 25, 2020	1.217%	—N/a
16	November 26, 2020	1.507%	—N/a
Average		1.752%	－
In the table above, the blue numbers represent the lowest ratings and the red numbers represent the highest ratings.; N/A denotes that the rating is not known..; This drama aired on a cable channel/pay TV which normally has a relatively smaller audience compared to free-to-air TV/public broadcasters (KBS, SBS, MBC and EBS).
