= SM Art Company =

South Korean company

SM Art Company Co., Ltd.
- Native name: 에스엠아트컴퍼니
- Company type: Private
- Founded: July 1, 2004; 21 years ago
- Defunct: December 31, 2015
- Fate: Dissolved
- Headquarters: Daehangno Live Theater, 64, Daehangno 12-gil, Jongno District, Seoul, South Korea
- Key people: Pyo In-bong; Jung Chang-hwan; (Co-representatives)
- Services: Musical theatre; Production management; Stage management
- Parent: SM Entertainment

SM Art Company (Korean: 에스엠아트컴퍼니) was a South Korean musical entertainment and production company under SM Entertainment. The company was founded on July 1, 2004, and became a subsidiary of SM during its launching ceremony on May 6, 2008, and facilitates projects for performances, musical planning, and theater management. It was responsible for Xanadu, The Donkey Show, and The Visit's musical production. The company was eventually dissolved on December 31, 2015.

== History ==
On May 26, 2008, SM Entertainment held a launching ceremony for SM Art Company, a musical entertainment and production company. The company is a subsidiary of SM focused on facilitating projects for performances, musical planning, and theater management. Lee Soo-man attended the launching ceremony at the Diamond Hall of the Plaza Hotel Seoul, reiterating the importance of production as the years 2000 to 2010 are the era of the producers. Pyo In-bong, who also attended the ceremony, is a comedian and theater actor and became the company's co-representative along with Jung Chang-hwan during the launching. Pyo stated that SM is a "big" company and that they will grow the existing refined parts and develop the undeveloped parts into blue chips.

SM Art Company intended to discover and showcase content based on singers and performers belonging to SM and plans to materialize diverse performances and business models. There were also plans to devise new collaborative influences by discovering different content based on the Asian network for music, singers, and performers secured by SM. Jang Joon-won, director of the company, stated that they would compete with content owned by SM, including top stars such as BoA and TVXQ, and diverse music sources, adding their plan to produce a "creative" musical using SM's existing music. Even before the company launched, SM had been preparing to enter the musical business by bringing in the Donkey Show's overseas musicals and operating small theaters such as SM TinTin Hall and live theaters in Daehangno. Jang remarked that the company planned to present four musicals consecutively within one to three years, adding that Lee Soo-man was leading the synopsis team on one of the "creative masterpieces" in the works in February 2009.

== Musicals ==
The musical Xanadu was SM Art Company's first work in which Super Junior members Kim Hee-chul and Kangin, and musical actor Choi Sung-won took the lead roles in the musical. Directed by Pyo In-bong, the musical was performed on September 9, 2008, at the Doosan Art Center Yonkang Hall in Yeonji, Jongno District, Seoul. An encore performance for The Donkey Show was held at Club Cocoon in Hongdae on November 13, 2009. When it premiered in Daehagno in April 2007, it was not well received due to its "unconventional" styles, such as a standing theater that removed the audience and degenerated cast members' costumes and a stage in which actors and audiences were mixed. The musical was directed and adapted by director Pyo and was attended by Super Junior's Leeteuk, Shindong, Eunhyuk, Shinee's Onew, and Tin Tin Five. The company also produced and hosted the works for The Visit.

== Performance halls ==
SM Art Company had five performance halls with 200 seats or more and explained that it was advantageous to preoccupy the market as it already had a concert hall, a key business in the musical industry.

- Live Theatre
- SM TinTin
- Galgari Hall
- SM Art Hall
- SM Star Hall
