= Horror Stories (film) =

- Film poster
- Directed by: Im Dae-woong; Jung Bum-sik; Hong Ji-young; Kim Gok; Kim Sun; Min Kyu-dong
- Written by: Im Dae-woong; Jung Bum-sik; Byun Hye-joo; Kim Gok; Kim Sun
- Produced by: Kim Won-guk; Min Jin-su
- Starring: Kim Ji-won; Yoo Yeon-seok; Choi Yoon-young; Jin Tae-hyun; Kim Hyun-soo; Nam Bo-ra; Jung Eun-chae; Bae Soo-bin; Kim Ye-won
- Cinematography: Lee Jeong-in; Kim Tae-gyeong; Yoon Nam-joo; Lee Seon-yeong
- Edited by: Jeong Jin-hee; Kim Sun-min
- Music by: Heo Deok-beom; Kim Seong-hyeon; Lee Jae-jin; Kang Min-seok
- Distributed by: Lotte Entertainment
- Release date: July 25, 2012
- Running time: 108 minutes
- Country: South Korea
- Language: Korean

Horror Stories (Korean: 무서운 이야기; RR: Museoun iyagi) is a 2012 horror omnibus film made up of four short films by five South Korean directors.

A high school student is kidnapped by a killer and has her life on the line. To survive, she tells him the scariest stories she knows; starting with "Don't Answer to the Door", a story of eerie things happening in a house with a brother and sister who are waiting for their mother, "Endless Flight" in which a flight attendant and a serial killer are left alone in an airplane up in the air, "Secret Recipe" a cruel 2012 version of a folktale in which two stepsisters fight to marry a wealthy cannibalistic man, and "Ambulance on the Death Zone" in which the survivors in a city filled with a deadly zombie virus suspect each other of being infected while riding together in an ambulance.

Horror Stories was the opening film of the 2012 Puchon International Fantastic Film Festival.

== Stories ==
=== Beginning ===
Plot
A high school student named Ji-won is kidnapped by a serial killer with a speech impediment. The killer can only go to sleep when he listens to scary stories or when he tastes blood. In order to not get killed, Ji-won Scheherazade-like begins telling him the four scariest stories she knows. After these short stories, the kidnapper then kills her and the movie ends with him telling her to now hear his stories.

- Directed by Min Kyu-dong
- Kim Ji-won as Ji-won
- Yoo Yeon-seok as the killer

=== Don't Answer the Door ===
Plot
Based on the Korean folktale The Sun and the Moon about a tiger who gobbles up and impersonates the mother of a young boy and his sister. A sister and brother are waiting for their mom to get home. However, their mother is late and the girl begins to get caught up in her own imagination. A suspicious delivery man knocks on the door, and the siblings try not to open it. The suspicious delivery man turns out to be the brother of a lady that committed suicide due to the mother of those children. Both children die at the end, the boy being lit on fire. (Korean: 해와 달; lit. 'The Sun and the Moon')

- Directed by Jung Bum-sik
- Kim Hyun-soo as Sun-Yi
- No Kang-min as Moon-Yi
- Ra Mi-ran as mother
- Lee Dong-kyu as fired employee
- No Hyeon-hee as English teacher
- Kim Tae-woo
- Kim Bo-kyung as Seon-yi's mother (voice)
- Lee Chae-kyung as Ghost, elder sister

=== Endless Flight ===
Plot
A flight attendant faces a serial killer alone, while the airplane is flying at an altitude of 30,000 feet. (Korean: 테러 비행기; lit. 'The Horror Plane')

- Directed by Im Dae-woong
- Choi Yoon-young as flight attendant So-jung
- Jin Tae-hyun as serial killer Doo-ho
- Woo Hyeon as captain
- Jin Yong-Wook as Detective Oh
- Jung Mi-Nam as Detective Kang
- Kim Ki-Cheon as Pilot
- Cha Jung-Won as Min-Joo

=== Secret Recipe ===
Plot
Based on the well-known Korean folktale Kongjwi and Patjwi, another variant of Cinderella. Gong-ji is getting married soon to Min, a rich and handsome bachelor. But she feels anxious due to her stepsister Baek-ji's severe jealousy. Wanting Min for herself, Baek-ji undergoes plastic surgery to look like Gong-ji. What they don't know is Min's secret to maintain his young face. Meanwhile, Min watches all of this, amused. In the ending, the step mother tries the kimchi that was made using her own daughter and Gong-ji dies. (Korean: 콩쥐, 팥쥐; lit. 'Kongjwi and Patjwi')

- Directed by Hong Ji-young
- Nam Bo-ra as Baek-ji
- Jung Eun-chae as Gong-ji
- Bae Soo-bin as Min
- Na Young-hee as Bak-ji's mother
- Im Seong-min as housemaid

=== Ambulance on the Death Zone ===
Plot
Among the five survivors inside an ambulance escaping at full speed from a horde of berserker zombies are a doctor, a nurse, an unconscious child and her mother. The young girl is found to have an unknown scar on her wrist, and the military doctor believes that she was infected by a zombie epidemic. However, the test comes back negative, but the doctor isn't buying it. In the ensuring chaos that follows, which the doctor tries to throw the girl off the ambulance, the driver accidentally swerves off the road, and the doctors uses the chance to take his gun out and attempt to shoot the girl. However, the nurse ends up shooting him. However, the gunshot attracts a horde of zombies which begin chasing them. everyone manages to survive and get on, but the zombies catch up and kill the doctor. The mom, still insistent that her daughter isn't bitten, tries to prevent the nurse from throwing her daughter off, the nurse beginning to believe that the girl's infected. However, the driver is bit, and accidentally shot by the mom after a brief struggle for the gun. The mom succeeds in shooting the nurse out of the car, which kills her. Coming the next morning, the girl and mom embrace, the girl not having been bitten after all. But the mom was bitten during the struggle, and turns in front of her daughter. (Korean: 앰뷸런스; lit. 'The Ambulance')

- Directed by Kim Gok and Kim Sun
- Kim Ji-young as Hyun-soo's mother
- Kim Ye-won as nurse
- Jo Han-cheol as army doctor
- Park Jae-woong as ambulance driver

== Sequels ==
A sequel, Horror Stories 2, using the same omnibus format but with a completely different cast, was released in 2013. A final sequel, Horror Stories 3, was released in 2016.
