= Chicago Typewriter (TV series) =

2017 South Korean TV series

- Promotional Poster
- Hangul: 시카고 타자기
- Hanja: 시카고打字機
- RR: Sikago tajagi
- MR: Sik'ago t'ajagi
- Genre: Fantasy; Romance; Comedy
- Written by: Jin Soo-wan
- Directed by: Kim Cheol-kyu
- Creative director: Choi Jin-hee
- Starring: Yoo Ah-in; Im Soo-jung; Go Kyung-pyo
- Composer: Nam Hye-seung
- Country of origin: South Korea
- Original language: Korean
- No. of episodes: 16

Production
- Executive producers: Kim Jin-yi; Park Ji-young
- Producer: Kim Ki-jae
- Cinematography: Park Jae-hong; Kwon Young-joon
- Editor: Kim Na-young
- Camera setup: Single-camera
- Running time: 70 minutes
- Production companies: THE UNICORN; Studio Dragon

Original release
- Network: tvN
- Release: April 7 – June 3, 2017

Chicago Typewriter (Korean: 시카고 타자기; RR: Sikago tajagi) is a 2017 South Korean television series starring Yoo Ah-in, Im Soo-jung, and Go Kyung-pyo. It ran from April to June 2017, with episodes every Friday and Saturday at 20:00 (KST) on tvN.

== Synopsis ==
The series depicts three resistance fighters who lived during the 1930s Japanese occupation of Korea, and are reincarnated into the present as a best-selling writer in a slump, a fan, and a ghostwriter.

It is a story of camaraderie, friendship, love and betrayal that lasts 80 years, as the trio of writer, ghostwriter and fan find out the truth of the past that haunts them.

== Cast ==
=== Main ===
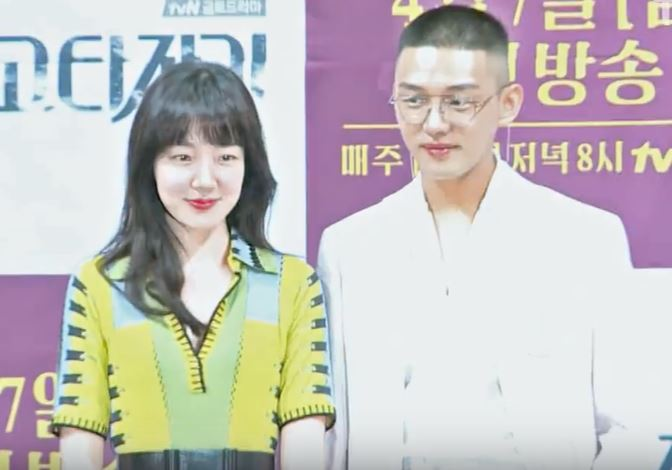
The main cast at a press conference

- Yoo Ah-in as Han Se-joo / Seo Hwi-young.
  - Choi Min-young as young Han Se-joo

A renowned writer in a slump who has celebrity-looks and tons of fans but is extremely depressed

- Im Soo-jung as Jeon Seol / Ryu Soo-hyun / Anastasia
  - Choi Myung-bin as young Jeon Seol
  - Jo Min-ah as young Ryu Soo-hyun

A veterinarian and literary fanatic who is an avid fan of Han Se-joo

- Go Kyung-pyo as Yoo Jin-oh / Shin Yool

A ghostwriter with a genius writing style, who has dry humor and loves jazz music and antiques

- Kwak Si-yang as Baek Tae-min / Heo Young-min
  - Son Sang-yeon as young Baek Tae-min

A writer who envies Han Se-joo for his writing skills

=== People around Han Se-joo ===
- Jo Woo-jin as Gal Ji-suk
- Oh Na-ra as Secretary Kang

=== People around Jeon Seol ===
- Yang Jin-sung as Ma Bang-jin
  - Kwak Ji-hye as young Ma Bang-jin
- Jeon Soo-kyeong as Wang Bang-wool
- Jung Yeon-joo as Bang-Jin's colleague
- Kang Hong-seok as Chef Won Dae-han
  - Song Joon-hee as young Won Dae-han
- Ji Dae-han as Won Man-hae

=== People around Baek Tae-min ===
- Chun Ho-jin as Baek Do-ha, Tae-min's father
- Jo Kyung-sook as Hong So-hee, Tae-min's mother

=== Others ===
- Lee Kyu-bok as Song Jong-wook
- Kim Hyun-sook as Veterinarian
- Shim Min as Mi-young
- Kim Sung-hoon as Lee Jung-bong
- Park Ji-hoon as Jeon Doo-yeob
- Kim Ki-soo as Jo Sang-chul
- Kim Si-hyun as Hannah Kim
- Choi Kyo-shik as Gardener
- Hong Dae-sung as Bodyguard of Carpediem
- Cha Geon-woo as Butler of Yool's family
- Jung Byung-ho as Yang ho-pil
- Jeon Yi-rang as Jang Ki-bong
- Gam Seung-min as Yang Hyung-sik
- Kang Dong-yoong as Mr. Jo
- Lee Doo-seok as Comrade Kang
- Ha Kyung: Jo Sang Cheol
- Jung Yeon Joo- Bang Jin's Colleague

=== Cameos ===
- Yoo Byung-jae as Deer keeper (episode 2)
- Choi Deok-moon as Jeon Seol's father (episode 3 & 16)
- Choi Song-hyun as MC (episode 3)
- WJSN as Themselves (episode 3)
- Jeon Mi-seon as Lim So-yoon / Madam Sophia (episode 9-11 & 13–16)
- Woo Do-im as Jo Sang-mi (episode 10–15)

== Production ==
The series was written by Jin Soo-wan who wrote the dramas Moon Embracing the Sun (2012) and Kill Me, Heal Me (2015).

This drama marks Im Soo-jung's small screen comeback after 13 years since 2004.

The series was filmed at various places in Seoul - SEOUL SEOUL 3080, Hannam-dong Book Park, Ikseon-dong and Seodaemun Prison History Museum.

== Original soundtrack ==
Chicago Typewriter OST Album

Soundtrack album
- Released: June 2, 2017
- Genre: Soundtrack
- Languages: Korean, English
- Label: CJ E&M MUSIC
- Producers: Nam Hye-seung, Park Sang-hee

No.	Title	Lyrics	Music	Artists	Length
1.	"Chicago Typewriter" (시카고 타자기)		Nam Hye-seung; Park Sang-hee		03:05
2.	"Satellite" (위성)	Nam Hye-seung; Park Sang-hee; Jello Ann	Nam Hye-seung; Park Sang-hee	SALTNPAPER	03:52
3.	"Blooming Memories" (아주 오래된 기억)	Nam Hye-seung; Park Jin-ho; MIYO	Nam Hye-seung; MIYO	Baek Ye-rin	03:43
4.	"Writing Our Stories" (우리의 얘기를 쓰겠소)	CuzD; Ricky; Dona	CuzD; Ricky; Dona	SG Wannabe	03:59
5.	"Be My Light"	Kevin Oh	Daniel Davidsen; Katrine "Neya" Klith; Peter Wallevik; Singing Beetle	Kevin Oh	03:48
6.	"Come With Me"	Kim Hee-jin; Jo Hye-eum	Nam Hye-seung; Park Sang-hee	Boni Pueri	03:58
7.	"Time Walk"	Jello Ann; Nam Hye-seung	Nam Hye-seung; Park Sang-hee	Boni Pueri	03:30
8.	"Satellite" (Inst.)		Nam Hye-seung; Park Sang-hee		03:52
9.	"Blooming Memories" (Inst.)		Nam Hye-seung; MIYO		03:43
10.	"Writing Our Stories" (Inst.)		CuzD; Ricky; Dona		03:37
11.	"Be My Light" (Inst.)		Daniel Davidsen; Katrine "Neya" Klith; Peter Wallevik; Singing Beetle		03:48
12.	"Ghostwriter Yoo Jin-oh" (유령작가 유진오)		Nam Hye-seung; Park Sang-hee		02:36
13.	"Aim the Gun" (총을 겨누다)		Nam Hye-seung; Park Sang-hee		03:02
14.	"Han Se-joo & Jeon Seol" (한세주의 전설)		Nam Hye-seung; Park Sang-hee		03:21
15.	"Time Travel" (시간여행)		Nam Hye-seung; Park Sang-hee		03:12
16.	"Remember the Novel We Wrote" (그날의 소설을 함께 기억해)		Nam Hye-seung; Park Sang-hee		03:10
Total length:					56:16

== Ratings ==
In this table, the blue numbers represent the lowest ratings and the red numbers represent the highest ratings.

Ep.	Original broadcast date	Average audience share		
Ep.	Original broadcast date	AGB Nielsen		TNmS
Ep.	Original broadcast date	Nationwide	Seoul	Nationwide
1	April 7, 2017	2.649%	2.924%	3.8%
2	April 8, 2017	2.822%	3.253%	3.2%
3	April 14, 2017	2.235%	2.555%	2.3%
4	April 15, 2017	2.094%	2.688%	2.6%
5	April 21, 2017	1.920%	1.847%	1.9%
6	April 22, 2017	2.236%	2.840%	2.6%
7	April 29, 2017	2.449%	2.546%	2.4%
8	April 29, 2017	2.449%	3.162%	2.8%
9	May 12, 2017	2.322%	2.761%	3.7%
10	May 13, 2017	2.275%	3.034%	2.0%
11	May 19, 2017	2.450%	2.657%	2.5%
12	May 20, 2017	2.252%	2.954%	2.4%
13	May 26, 2017	2.335%	2.795%	2.2%
14	May 27, 2017	1.444%	1.762%	1.7%
15	June 2, 2017	2.419%	2.975%	2.4%
16	June 3, 2017	2.162%	2.551%	2.9%
Average		2.27%	2.71%	2.6%

- This drama airs on a cable channel/pay TV which normally has a relatively smaller audience compared to free-to-air TV/public broadcasters (KBS, SBS, MBC and EBS).
