= Ko Kyung-pyo =

South Korean actor (born 1990)

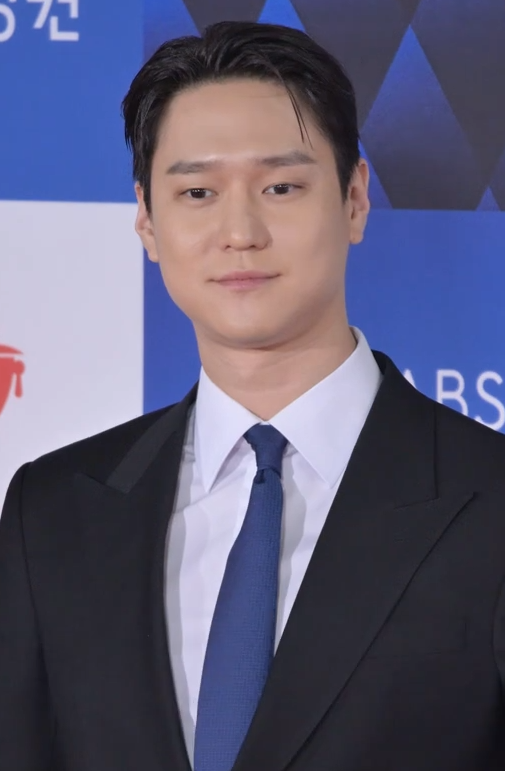
- Ko in 2022
- Born: June 11, 1990 (age 36); Namdong-gu, Incheon, South Korea
- Education: Konkuk University
- Occupation: Actor
- Years active: 2010–present
- Agent(s): CL&Company
- Height: 6 ft 2 in (188 cm)

Korean name
- Hangul: 고경표
- Hanja: 高庚杓
- RR: Go Gyeongpyo
- MR: Ko Kyŏngp'yo

Ko Kyung-pyo (Korean: 고경표; born June 11, 1990) is a South Korean actor. He began his career in 2010 and became a cast member of the comedy show Saturday Night Live Korea for its first three seasons (2011–2012). He then gained wide recognition for his roles in the television dramas Reply 1988 (2015–16), Don't Dare to Dream (2016), and Chicago Typewriter (2017). Ko's performance in Park Chan-wook's film Decision to Leave (2022) made him a recipient of a Best Supporting Actor nomination and a Popular Star Award at the Blue Dragon Film Awards. He has since transitioned into leading roles in television series Strongest Deliveryman (2017), Cross (2018), Love in Contract (2022), and comedy film 6/45 (2022).

== Early life and education ==
Ko Kyung-pyo was born in 1990 in Incheon, South Korea. He has an older sister. His name uses the characters Kyeong (庚) and Pyo (杓). His parents run a buckwheat noodle (makguksu) restaurant in Incheon. He attended an all-boys middle school and high school. In his second year of middle school, he was scouted by an agent while on the street but did not enter the entertainment industry at the time. Instead, he began attending an acting academy in his second year of high school.

While attending the Film Department at Konkuk University, he made films with classmates including the short film Good Kyung-soo, that won him the Best Actor Award during the university's film festival. He passed an audition arranged by YG Entertainment and trained as an actor for more than a year while at university. However, he left YG when the film he was set to star in, 70 Days (Into the Fire), was canceled.

== Career ==
=== 2010–2014: Beginnings and SNL Korea ===
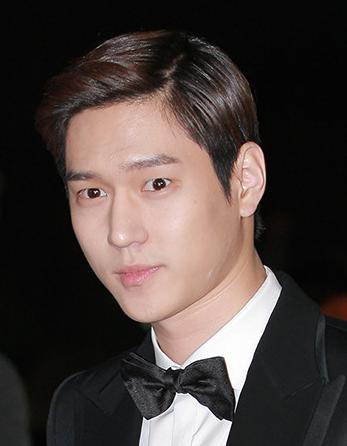
Ko at the 34th Blue Dragon Film Awards in 2013

In 2010, Ko initially planned to complete his mandatory military service but postponed it after passing an open audition for a drama. He then portrayed Bong Il-tae in the drama Jungle Fish 2 (2010), marking his debut as an actor while at university. He became a cast member of the live sketch comedy show Saturday Night Live Korea for its first three seasons from 2011 to 2012. He then featured in the sitcom Standby (2012).

His role as the clumsy student teacher Ko Byeong-sin in a segment titled "Escape" of the film Horror Stories 2 (2013) caught the attention of director Kim Byung-wook who gave him a leading role in the sitcom Potato Star 2013QR3 (2013). He gained recognition for his friendly image and resemblance to Olaf, the snowman from the Frozen film franchise. He then featured in dramas My Cute Guys (2013) and Naeil's Cantabile (2014).

=== 2015–2018: Breakthrough and rising popularity ===
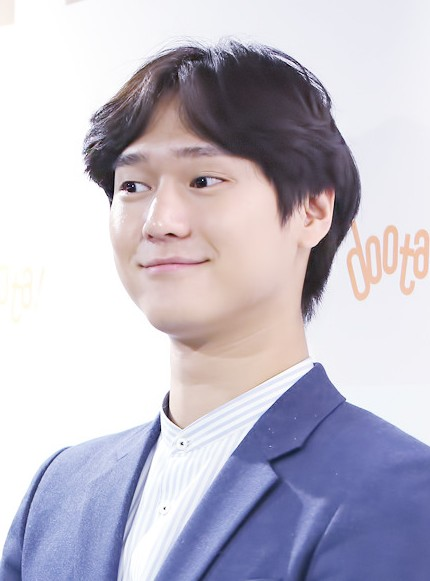
Ko in February 2016

Ko gained wider recognition with his roles in Reply 1988 (2015) as the dutiful son and friend Sung Sun-woo. In January, Ko and the rest of the casts and crews went to vacation in Phuket, Thailand, which was organized by the Reply 1988 production crew as a reward for the success of the drama. There, Ko and other three other cast members were "kidnapped" by director Na Young-seok. He brought them to Namibia in southern Africa for his travel show over Youth Over Flowers where the filmed in Africa for 10 days.

The following year, Ko starred in Don't Dare to Dream (2016). He received the New Star Award at the 2016 SBS Drama Awards for his performance. In 2017, Go starred in tvN's fantasy-romance drama Chicago Typewriter. The same year, he was cast in his first leading role in the KBS drama Strongest Deliveryman alongside Chae Soo-bin. He then starred in medical thriller drama Cross which premiered in January 2018.

=== 2020–present: Leading roles ===
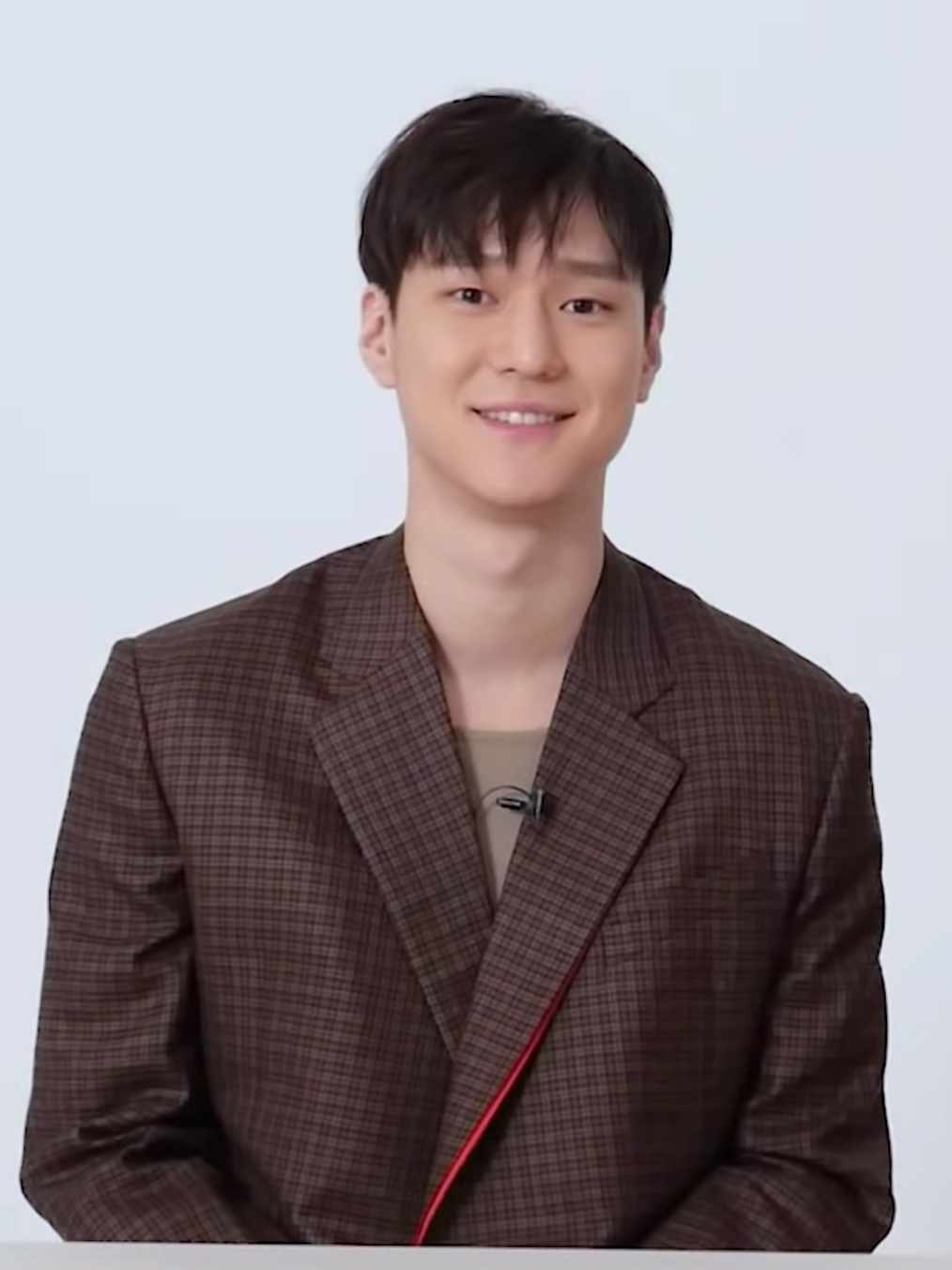
Ko in 2020

After completing his mandatory military service, Ko made his television comeback in the 2020 JTBC drama Private Lives. In 2021, he made cameo appearances in the tvN drama My Roommate Is a Gumiho and Netflix series D.P.

In 2022, Ko appeared in Park Chan-wook's mystery film Decision to Leave as Soo-wan. The film was selected to compete for the Palme d'Or at the 2022 Cannes Film Festival, where Park Chan-wook won Best Director. His portrayal earned him a nomination for Best Supporting Actor at the 43rd Blue Dragon Film Awards, and won him a Popular Star Award. Also in 2022, he starred in Park Gyu-tae's comedy film 6/45. It was released on August 24, 2022. He also starred in film Seoul Vibe which was released on Netflix on August 26, 2022. Ko then had a leading role in the television series Love in Contract. It aired on tvN from September 21 to November 10, 2022. He then appeared in Takashi Miike's streaming series Connect. It premiered on Disney+ on December 7, 2022.

In 2024, Ko starred in the television series Frankly Speaking. It premiere on JTBC on May 1, 2024 and was also available for streaming on Netflix in selected regions. The following year, he starred as a cast member in the TvN's variety show Sixth Sense: City Tour. He next starred in tvN's workplace comedy Undercover Miss Hong.

== Personal life ==
=== Enlistment ===
Ko enlisted for his mandatory military service on May 21, 2018. He was discharged on January 15, 2020.

=== DUI incident ===
On the early morning of November 14, 2026, it was reported that Ko is under police investigation after causing a traffic accident while driving under the influence of alcohol. According to a report by Yonhap News, Ko crashed into a street cleaning truck while driving his personal car in Donggyo-dong, Mapo-gu, Seoul, around 3:30 a.m. A breathalyzer test conducted at the scene confirmed that Ko's blood alcohol concentration was at a level warranting license revocation.

Following news of the incident, his agency, CL&Company, issued an apology to those affected and the public, further addressed Ko's response to the incident and pledged that he would take responsibility for his actions. Ko's upcoming fan meeting on the 21st has been canceled, and television networks are scrambling to edit him out of current and upcoming broadcasts, including MBC's Hangout with Yoo, tvN's Sixth Sense: B-Side, The Village Barber Season 2, and TVING's The Great Escape: Urban Legends.

== Filmography ==
=== Film ===
Year	Title	Role	Notes	Ref.
2012	Graduation Trip		Short film	
2012	A Millionaire on the Run	Hyung-chul		
2013	The Story of Man & Woman		Short film	
2013	Horror Stories 2	Go Byung-shin	Segment: "The Escape"	
2013	Believe Me	Yoon-seong		
2014	One Summer Night	Joon-ki	Short film	
2014	Man on High Heels	Jin-woo		
2014	The Admiral: Roaring Currents	Oh Duk-yi		
2015	Casa Amor: Exclusive for Ladies	Pyo Kyeong-soo	Cameo	
2015	Coin Locker Girl	Chi-do		
2015	The Treacherous	Grand Prince Jinseong		
2018	Seven Years of Night	Seo-won		
2022	Uracai Haruki	Yeo Ryeom	Short film	
2022	Decision to Leave	Soo-wan		
2022	6/45	Sergeant Park Chun-woo		
2022	Seoul Vibe	DJ Oh Woo-sam		
2024	Amazon Bullseye	Director Choi		

=== Television series ===
Year	Title	Role	Notes	Ref.
2010	Jungle Fish 2	Bong Il-tae		
2011	I Believe in Love	Kwon Pil-young		
2012	Operation Proposal	Song Chan-wook		
2012	Standby	Kim Kyung-pyo		
2012	Quiz of God 3	Seo In-gak	Cameo (Episodes 10–12)	
2013	Flower Boys Next Door	Oh Dong-hoon		
2013	Potato Star 2013QR3	Noh Min-hyuk		
2014	Naeil's Cantabile	Yoo Il-rak		
2015	Warm and Cozy	Jung-min	Cameo (Episodes 1–2)	
2015–2016	Reply 1988	Sung Sun-woo		
2016	Don't Dare to Dream	Go Jung-won		
2017	Chicago Typewriter	Yoo Jin-oh		
2017	Strongest Deliveryman	Choi Kang-soo		
2018	Cross	Kang In-gyu		
2020	Private Lives	Lee Jung-hwan		
2021	My Roommate Is a Gumiho	Sanshin	Cameo (Episodes 7, 10–11, 13–14)	
2022	Love in Contract	Jung Ji-ho		
2024	Frankly Speaking	Song Gi-baek		
2026	Undercover Miss Hong	Shin Jeong-woo		

=== Web series ===
Year	Title	Role	Notes	Ref.
2017	The Best Moment to Quit Your Job	Lee Min-woo	Cameo	
2021–2023	D.P.	Corporal Park Sung-woo	Seasons 1–2	
2022	Connect	Oh Jin-seop		

=== Television shows ===
Year	Title	Role	Notes	Ref.
2011–2012	Saturday Night Live Korea	Cast member	Seasons 1–3	
2016	Youth Over Flowers: Africa	Cast member		
2024	The Backpacker Chef	Cast member	Season 2	
2025	Sixth Sense: City Tour	Cast member	Episodes 1-8	
2025–2026	Reply 1988 10th Anniversary	Cast member		

=== Music videos ===
Year	Title	Ref.
2025	"Hyehwa-dong (or Ssangmun-dong)"	

=== Music video appearances ===
Year	Song Title	Artist	Ref.
2021	"Noting special with the day" (별거 없던 그 하루로)	Im Chang-jung	

== Discography ==
=== Soundtrack appearances ===
Title	Year	Album
"I Wake Up Because of You" with Kim Seul-gi	2013	My Cute Guys OST
"Lalala"	2017	Strongest Deliveryman OST
"Hyehwa-dong (or Ssangmun-dong) (혜화동 (혹은 쌍문동))" (Ssangmun-dong Kids featuring Ko Kyung-pyo)	2025	Reply 1988 10th Anniversary OST

=== Singles ===
Title	Year	Album
"...We were in love..." (...사랑했잖아...)	2024	Non-album single

== Awards and nominations ==
Name of the award ceremony, year presented, category, nominee of the award, and the result of the nomination
Award ceremony	Year	Category	Nominee / Work	Result	Ref.
Baeksang Arts Awards	2016	Best New Actor – Film	Coin Locker Girl	Nominated	
Blue Dragon Film Awards	2013	Best New Actor	Horror Stories 2	Nominated	
Blue Dragon Film Awards	2022	Best Supporting Actor	Decision to Leave	Nominated	
Blue Dragon Film Awards	2022	Chung Jung-won Popular Star Award	Decision to Leave	Won	
KBS Drama Awards	2017	Excellence Award, Actor in a Miniseries	Strongest Deliveryman	Nominated	
SBS Drama Awards	2016	Top Excellence Award, Actor in a Romantic-Comedy Drama	Don't Dare to Dream	Nominated	
SBS Drama Awards	2016	New Star Award	Don't Dare to Dream	Won	
The Seoul Awards	2017	Best Supporting Actor (Drama)	Chicago Typewriter	Nominated	
tvN10 Awards	2016	Two Star Award	Reply 1988 & SNL Korea	Nominated	
