= Park Kyung-lim =

South Korean entertainer (born 1979)

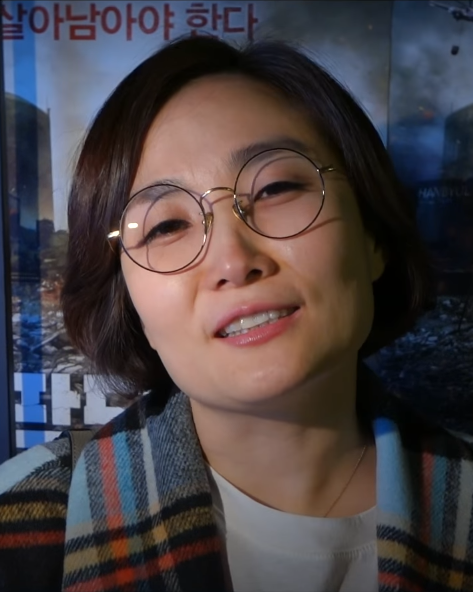
- Park in December 2016
- Born: March 30, 1979 (age 47); Galhyeon-dong, Eunpyeong District, Seoul, South Korea
- Education: Department of Broadcasting and Entertainment Dongduk Women's University; School of Film & Acting of New York Film Academy
- Employer: We Dream Company
- Spouse: Park Jung-hoon (m. 2007)
- Children: 1

Comedy career
- Years active: 1996–present
- Medium: Stand-up, Television
- Genres: Observational, Sketch, Wit, Parody, Slapstick, Dramatic, Sitcom

Korean name
- Hangul: 박경림
- Hanja: 朴京林
- RR: Bak Gyeongrim
- MR: Pak Kyŏngnim

Park Kyung-lim (Korean: 박경림; born March 30, 1979) is a South Korean businesswoman and entertainer, known for her work as a comedian, host, radio DJ, and actress. In 2001, at age 22, she became the youngest entertainer to receive a Grand Prize ("Daesang"), which she won at the MBC Entertainment Awards. The following year, in 2002, her album "Park Gote Project," a collaboration with Park Soo-hong, earned her the Golden Disk Special Award and New Female Artist Award at Mnet Music Awards.

Park regularly hosts various events in South Korea. Her work includes leading press conferences for films and dramas, as well as hosting fan meetings, concerts, and talk shows. Reports indicate she hosts approximately 100 events annually, and she has earned the moniker "Queen of Event Hosting."

As a philanthropist, Park has been an ambassador for Save the Children since 2006. Her contributions were recognized by the Ministry of Health and Welfare of South Korea with an award for happiness sharing in 2012 and a presidential commendation in 2024.

== Early life ==
Park Kyung-lim was born on March 30, 1979, in Galhyeon-dong, Eunpyeong District, Seoul. Her father, a disabled Vietnam War veteran who served in the Marine Corps, sustained a bullet wound to his arm and had shrapnel in his leg. Despite his disability, he worked in various trades and daily labor. Financial difficulties persisted, and around the time of Park's birth, their unlicensed house in Gupabal, Seoul, was demolished. This event led the family into a period of extreme poverty.

Growing up in poverty, Park found strength in her dream of becoming an MC. This aspiration helped her navigate challenging times. During a 5th-grade picnic, she substituted for an ill host, skillfully entertaining the audience and discovering her talent for hosting. Inspired by her homeroom teacher's advice that becoming an MC would allow her to observe society, she decided to pursue the career.

"I was in charge of emceeing the school's entertainment class, and I was also the school president when I was in the 6th grade. When I was young, I liked the fact that even though I came from a poor family, I could be recognized in other ways and that other people could not ignore me. "I thought I had to become a deep person to become a good MC, so from then on I started studying by clipping newspaper editorials."

During her middle and high school years, Park became known as a student MC and was invited to host festivals at nearby schools. Her relationship with radio began in 1996 when she participated in the KBS Cool FM "Turn Up the Volume Yvonne" summer camp. During a talent show on the bus, she hosted and entertained the passengers, leading a producer to suggest she host on stage during public broadcasts. She shared the stage with popular singers of the time, including Solid, Kim Won-jun, Kim Gun-mo, Shin Seung-hoon, and R.ef.

Park gained prominence as a high school star through MBC Standard FM's 'Starry Night'. In 1996, she participated in the show's summer camp, which was hosted by Lee Moon-sae and written by Go Eun-kyung. Park attracted attention by appearing on an entertainment program wearing a school uniform. Subsequently, she became a regular host on MBC Radio's '2 O'Clock Date' alongside Lee Moon-sae, hosting a 10-minute segment. She was loved by listeners for her unique voice and confident speaking.

== Career ==
=== Beginning ===
Park officially debuted in 1998. After graduating from high school, she began appearing in various entertainment programs, serving as an MC for popular shows such as Sunday Sunday Night, Exclamation Point, and Cohabitation Together. She became known for a new entertainment persona, earning nicknames like 'Square Jaw' and 'Unique Voice'. In the same year, Park enrolled in Dongduk Women's University's Broadcasting and Entertainment Department, where she received a full scholarship for academic excellence.

In 2000, she served as an MC on KBS2's Declaration of Freedom Today is Saturday and MBC's Radio Experience. She also appeared as an actress in MBC's Truth and KBS2's Great Friends, and was a regular guest on KBS 2FM's Cha Tae-hyun's FM Popular Song. Park took on the role of Zo In-sung's love interest in the South Korean youth sitcom, Nonstop 2, which aired from 2000 to 2002. This series is regarded as one of the legendary sitcoms of its time, Park garnered significant audience support through her performance.

In 2001, Park achieved several career milestones, including the Baeksang Arts Awards Female Entertainment Award, the KBS Radio MC Award, and the MBC Drama Awards Radio Excellence Award. She also received the prestigious MBC Entertainment Awards Grand Prize, making her the sole recipient of the Entertainment Grand Prize in her twenties, a record unbroken for over 20 years.

In 2002, Park released her first album, "Park Gote Project," a collaboration with Park Soo-hong. The album sold 250,000 copies, and she embarked on a tour of seven cities. For this album, she won the Golden Disk Special Award and the Mnet Music Award for New Female Artist.

=== Studying abroad ===
At the peak of her career, while actively involved in 7 to 8 programs and enjoying significant popularity with an online fan club of 150,000 members, Park took a hiatus to study abroad. This decision was driven by her childhood aspiration to become an MC capable of interviewing foreign guests in English. She left for the United States, enrolling at the New York Film Academy School of Film & Acting. Her English proficiency was initially low; she was placed at the lowest level in her language school's entrance test upon arriving in New York. However, Park completed her studies as a special scholarship student on October 15, 2004.

=== Career comeback ===
After two years of study abroad, Park made her comeback in February 2005 on SBS TV's Ambitious talk show. Viewers love her eloquence, and the special 100th episode of the show achieved a high viewership rating of 21%. In August 2005, Park signed an exclusive contract with agency Phantom. She regained popularity as an MC for SBS's Good Sunday: X-Man!, a role she held until 2006. From April 25, 2005, to October 14, 2007, Park hosted the MBC Standard FM Radio show Park Kyung-rim's Heart Wave. She resigned after 2 years and 6 months, citing health reasons due to the demanding late-night live broadcast schedule.

From 2007 to 2008, She was a permanent member of High Five, which was part of KBS's Happy Sunday. The show also featured comedian Jo Hye-ryun, entertainer Hyun Young, singer Chae Yeon, and actress Kim Min-sun. It aired on KBS 2TV from May 6, 2007, to May 18, 2008. Directed by Lee Myung-han and Na Young-seok, and hosted by Jee Seok-jin, the show featured five female stars undertaking various job experiences, from flight attendants to police officers.

Since April 7, 2008, Park served as DJ for MBC Radio Standard FM's Starry Night, taking over from Park Jeong-ah. Hosting the show had been a long-held dream since her school days, representing both a challenge and an opportunity. Park also hosted her own show, Park Kyung-lim's Wonderful Outing, on MBC Every1, and hosted Thank You for Waking Us Up! and Thank You for Raising Me Up! with SS501.

=== After motherhood ===
After giving birth to her son, Park stated that she received numerous offers for TV shows featuring her son rather than solo appearances. Declining these led to a gradual decrease in solo show offers, which she found disheartening. Subsequently, she became more active in radio and offline events. Her first film-related hosting role was in 2009, when she hosted the press conference for the film Lady Daddy. She has since continued to serve as a film event MC.

In 2010, Park served as a host for the KBS show Oh! My School alongside Park Myung-soo, with Tony (from H.O.T.) and Simon D (from Supreme Team) as regular cast members. Both Park and Tony left the show in 2011. In 2012, Park signed an exclusive contract with the entertainment group KOEN. On June 10, 2013, Park became the DJ for 'Two O'Clock Date', making her the first female MC in the program's history.

In 2015, Park published Mom's Dream, a book featuring interviews with mothers. To accompany the book, she organized the 'Mom's Dream' train event, taking 100 mothers on a trip to Jeongseon, Gangwon-do. She also launched Women's Private Lives, the second installment of her talk concert series exclusively for mothers. Around this period, she occasionally attended and hosted production conferences for Korean films. By 2015, Park, alongside Park Ji-yoon, was noted as a preferred MC by broadcasters and film companies for such press conferences, recognized for her friendly demeanor and ability to engage celebrities in conversation.

In 2016, Park was announced as a co-host for the Netflix reality show Ultimate Beastmaster along with comedian Seo Kyung-seok. Park left her radio show Two O'Clock Date September 2016. By 2017, Park had established herself as a prominent host for film press conferences, having introduced production conferences for over 200 films.

In April 2018, Park served as an MC for the tvN show Global View, alongside Park Jae-min and Jang Kang-myung. The following month, in May, the Ministry of Gender Equality and Family appointed Park as a public relations ambassador for the Women's New Work Center at the Central Saeil Center in Mapo District, Seoul. In October 2018, Park held a talk show to celebrate her 20th debut anniversary.

By 2025, Park is a prominent event host, particularly for film and drama press conferences. She also hosts fan meetings, concerts, and talk shows, reportedly presenting around 100 events annually. She has earned nicknames such as "event queen," "queen of hosting," and "queen of previews." Her success in this field is attributed to thorough preparation, including tailoring costumes to match film characteristics and visiting filming locations to understand a film's background.

== Other venture ==
=== Business ===
In 2018, Park founded the creative group WeDream Company with former collaborators from her publishing and performance projects.

=== Philanthropy ===
Park's philanthropic engagement spans nearly two decades. In 2006, she was appointed a goodwill ambassador for Save the Children, an international children's rights NGO, following her involvement in the "Smile Again" campaign, which supported children with incurable diseases. From 2008 to 2022, Park participated in the Save the Children "Save the Newborns Hat Knitting Campaign," an initiative that provided warmth to infants in developing countries. This effort included hosting public participation workshops. In 2016, she collaborated with Kang Ha-neul on a life-streaming campaign for this initiative.

In 2011, Park pledged ₩100 million to the Neonatal Intensive Care Unit (NICU) at Jeil Hospital in Seoul. Her decision was prompted by a personal experience involving a miscarriage and subsequent observation of the NICU's challenging environment. She committed to donating ₩10 million annually for ten years.

Park received the 1st Happy Sharing Person Award from the Ministry of Health and Welfare in 2012. Between 2012 and 2023, she participated six times in the "International Children's Marathon," raising awareness and funds for children globally. Between 2014 and 2021, she organized the "Eri Eri Bazaar" seven times, raising approximately ₩200 million. These funds supported diverse causes, including essential supplies for crisis families, psychological treatment for abused children, and medical and nutritional needs in rural areas.

Park also supported Save the Children's campaign advocating for legislation on home visiting services, urging government support for safe childcare and parental burden alleviation. In 2024, her dedication to children's and families' welfare was recognized with a Presidential Commendation at the 103rd Children's Day Celebration hosted by the Ministry of Health and Welfare.

== Personal life ==
Park's noted by the media for her wit and kindness. Park met her husband, Park Jung-hoon, a contestant on the KBS show 'Introduce Me to a Good Person,' which she hosted. They exchanged contact information after the show's recording, in an after-party. They married at the Shilla Hotel in Seoul on July 15, 2007. On January 16, 2009, she gave birth to a son. On July 16, 2011, she announced on MBC's Saebakhwi that she was expecting her second child. In October 2011, she suffered a miscarriage.

== Filmography ==
=== Film ===
Film acting credits
| Year | Title | | Role | Ref. |
| Year | English | Korean | Role | Ref. |
|---|---|---|---|---|
| 2000 | Ghost Taxi | 공포 택시 | Cameo appearance | |
| 2002 | Funny Movie | 재밌는 영화 | | |
| 2003 | Oh! Happy Day | 오! 해피데이 | | |
| 2016 | Familyhood | 굿바이 싱글 | Drama Presentation MC (Cameo appearance) | |
| 2021 | Hostage: Missing Celebrity | 인질 | Cameo appearance | |

=== Television series ===
| Year | Title | Role | Notes | Ref. |
|---|---|---|---|---|
| 2000 | The Truth | Choi Eun-shil | | |
| 2000 | Nonstop 2 | Park Kyung-lim | | |
| 2002 | Sidestreet People | Choi Young-mi | | |
| 2002 | Rival | Go Eun-se | | |
| 2005 | Cute or Crazy | Park Kyung-lim | | |
| 2009 | High Kick Through the Roof | Kyung-lim | Cameo appearance ep. 19 | |
| 2011 | The Greatest Love | Park Kyung-lim | Cameo appearance | |
| 2011 | The Musical | Sa Bok-ja | | |
| 2013 | Potato Star 2013QR3 | Bo-young's cracked voice | Cameo appearance ep. 10 | |
| 2013 | Unemployed Romance | Female professor | Cameo appearance | |
| 2021 | Imitation | TV program host | Cameo appearance ep. 2 | |

=== Web drama ===
| Year | Title | Role | Ref. |
|---|---|---|---|
| 2017 | Sweet Revenge | Duk-hee's mom | |

=== Television show ===
| Year | Title | Role | Notes | Ref. |
|---|---|---|---|---|
| 2000–2002 | Star Survival Dongeodongrak | Cast member | | |
| 2005–2006 | X-Man | Cast member | | |
| 2005–2006 | Music Bank | Host | with Kang Kyung-joon | |
| 2005–2006 | SS501 Thank You for Waking Me Up | Host | with SS501 | |
| 2010–2011 | Oh! My School | Host | | |
| 2012 | Park Kyung-rim's Oh! Happy Day | Host | | |
| 2018 | Global Views | Host | | |
| 2021 | Park Kyung-lim's Life Story | Host | | |
| 2022 | Mystery Duet | Panelist | | |
| 2022–2023 | Lovers of Joseon | Host | with Park Soo-hong, Choi Seong-guk and Oh Na-mi | |
| 2023 | Big Brother Era | Regular Member | | |

=== Web shows ===
| Year | Title | Role | Ref. |
|---|---|---|---|
| 2016 | Ultimate Beastmaster | Host with comedian Seo Kyung-seok | |
| 2023 | The Devil's Plan | Player | |

=== Music video appearances ===
Music video appearances
| Year | Title | Artist(s) | Ref. |
|---|---|---|---|
| 2007 | "Queen" | Bada | |

== Stage ==
=== Musical ===
| Year | Title | | Role | | | Ref. |
| Year | English | Korean | Actress | Coproducer | Creative director | Ref. |
|---|---|---|---|---|---|---|
| 2009 | Hairspray | 헤어스프레이 | Tracy | Yes | —N/a | |
| 2025 | Dream High | 드림하이 | Principal of Kirin Arts High School | —N/a | Yes | |

=== Talk show ===
| Year | Title | | Venue | Date | Ref. |
| Year | English | Korean | Venue | Date | Ref. |
|---|---|---|---|---|---|
| 2014 | Park Kyung-rim Talk Concert | 박경림 토크콘서트 | Ewha Womans University Samsung Hall | October 1 to 5 | |
| 2015 | Park Kyung-rim Talk Concert Season 2 | 박경림 토크콘서트 2 | Ewha Womans University Samsung Hall | October 7 to 11 | |
| 2015 | Park Kyung-rim Talk Concert Season 2 | 박경림 토크콘서트 2 | Centum City Sohyang Theater Lotte Card Hall | November 14 | |
| 2016 | Park Kyung-rim Talk Concert Season 3 | 박경림 토크콘서트 3 | Ewha Womans University Samsung Hall | November 16 to 20 | |
| 2018 | Park Kyung-rim Listen Concert | 박경림 리슨콘서트 | Ewha Womans University Samsung Hall | October 19 to 21 | |
| 2019 | Park Kyung-rim Listen Concert | 박경림 리슨콘서트 | Daegu Health University Indang Art Hall | January 12 | |
| 2019 | Park Kyung-rim Listen Concert | 박경림 리슨콘서트 | Icheon Art Hall Grand Performance Hall | January 19 | |

== Radio show ==
Radio hosting credits
| Year | Title | | Broadcaster | Role | Ref. |
| Year | English | Korean | Broadcaster | Role | Ref. |
|---|---|---|---|---|---|
| 2001 – 2002 | Park Soo-hong, Park Kyung-rim's FM Popular Song | 박수홍, 박경림의 FM 인기 가요 | KBS2 FM | Host (with Park Soo-hong) | |
| April 2005 – October 2007 | Park Kyung-rim's Heart Wave | 박경림의 심심타파 | MBC Standard FM | Host | |
| April 2008 – May 2011 | Park Kyung-rim's Starry Night | 박경림의 별이 빛나는 밤에 | MBC Standard FM | Host | |
| June 2013 – September 2016 | Two-o'clock date: This is Park Kyung-rim | 두시의 데이트 박경림입니다 | MBC FM4U | Host | |

== Discography ==
=== Single ===
| Title | Year | Peak chart positions | Album | Ref. |
| Title | Year | KOR Hot | Album | Ref. |
|---|---|---|---|---|
| "Swamp with Illusion" | 2002 | — | Park Brother and Sister Expressway Tape (with Park Soo-hong) | |
| "Hello ~ Hot Bar" | 2002 | — | Park Brother and Sister Expressway Tape (with Park Soo-hong) | |
| "Love that will be criticized" | 2002 | — | Park Brother and Sister Expressway Tape (with Park Soo-hong) | |
| "Park Gote Trot Medley" | 2002 | — | Park Brother and Sister Expressway Tape (with Park Soo-hong) | |
| "Forever With You" | 2002 | — | Park Brother and Sister Expressway Tape (with Park Soo-hong) | |
| "Pretty things aren't the only things that are beautiful" | 2002 | — | Park Brother and Sister Expressway Tape (with Park Soo-hong) | |
| "Gorgeous outing" | 2002 | — | Park Brother and Sister Expressway Tape (with Park Soo-hong) | |
| "Are you shy?" | 2002 | — | Park Brother and Sister Expressway Tape (with Park Soo-hong) | |
| "On a wonderful day in October" | 2002 | — | Park Brother and Sister Expressway Tape (with Park Soo-hong) | |
| "Highway Romance" | 2002 | — | Park Brother and Sister Expressway Tape (with Park Soo-hong) | |
| "Swamp of Illusion (Remix)" | 2002 | — | Park Brother and Sister Expressway Tape (with Park Soo-hong) | |
"—" denotes releases that did not chart or were not released in that region.

== Bibliography ==
| Year | Title | | ISBN | Ref. |
| Year | English | Korean | ISBN | Ref. |
|---|---|---|---|---|
| 2001 | Park Kyung-lim, Cartoon Essay | 네모천사 경림이 | ISBN 899-52-35306 | |
| 2004 | Park Kyung-lim, English Success Story | 박경림 영어 성공기(영어, 박경림만큼만 뻔뻔해지자!) | ISBN 897-04-18-911 | |
| 2008 | People | 박경림의 사람 | ISBN 978-89-01-08223-3 | |
| 2014 | Mother's Dream (Dreaming Mothers met by Park Kyung-rim) | 엄마의 꿈(박경림이 만난 꿈꾸는 엄마들) | ISBN 978-89-54-63413-7 | |

== Other activities ==
=== Hosting ===
| Year | Title | Notes | Ref. |
|---|---|---|---|
| 2022 | 19th EBS International Documentary Film Festival (EIDF) | with Choi Soo-jong; opening ceremony | |

=== Ambassadorship ===
| Year | Title | Ref. |
|---|---|---|
| 2001 | Ambassador of the 5th Seoul International Manga Animation Festival | |
| 2006–present | Save the Children Ambassador | |
| 2008 | Seoul City's Public Relations Ambassador | |
| 2010 | Promotional Ambassador at Gangnam Tax Office (44th Taxpayer's Day) | |
| 2018 | Women's New Work Center Ambassador | |

== Accolades ==
=== Award and nominations ===
Awards and nominations received by Park
| Award ceremony | Year | Category | Nominee / Work | Result | Ref. |
|---|---|---|---|---|---|
| 37th Baeksang Arts Awards | 2001 | TV Category Female Entertainment Award | Park Kyung-lim | Won | |
| Brand Customer Loyalty Awards | 2023 | MC Award | Park Kyung-lim | Won | |
| Cheongho Nice Selected Star | 2003 | Good Conduct Award | Park Kyung-lim | Won | |
| 110th Anniversary of Dongduk Women's University | 2020 | Proud Dongduk Person Award | Park Kyung-lim | Won | |
| 17th Golden Disk Awards | 2002 | Special Award | Park Kyung-lim | Won | |
| KBS Drama Awards | 2001 | Radio MC Award | Park Kyung-lim | Won | |
| MBC Drama Awards | 2006 | Excellence Award — Radio | Park Kyung-lim | Won | |
| MBC Entertainment Awards | 2001 | Grand Prize | Park Kyung-lim | Won | |
| Mnet Asian Music Awards | 2002 | Best New Female Artist | "Swamp of Illusion" (착각의 늪) | Nominated | |

=== State honors ===
Name of country, name of award ceremony or organization, year given, and name of honor
| Country | Ceremony or Organization | Year | Honor or Award | Ref. |
|---|---|---|---|---|
| South Korea | Ministry of Health and Welfare | 2012 | Award for Happiness Sharing | |
| South Korea | Ministry of Health and Welfare | 2024 | Presidential Commendation (Note: Children's Day) | |
