= Sung Joon =

South Korean actor and model

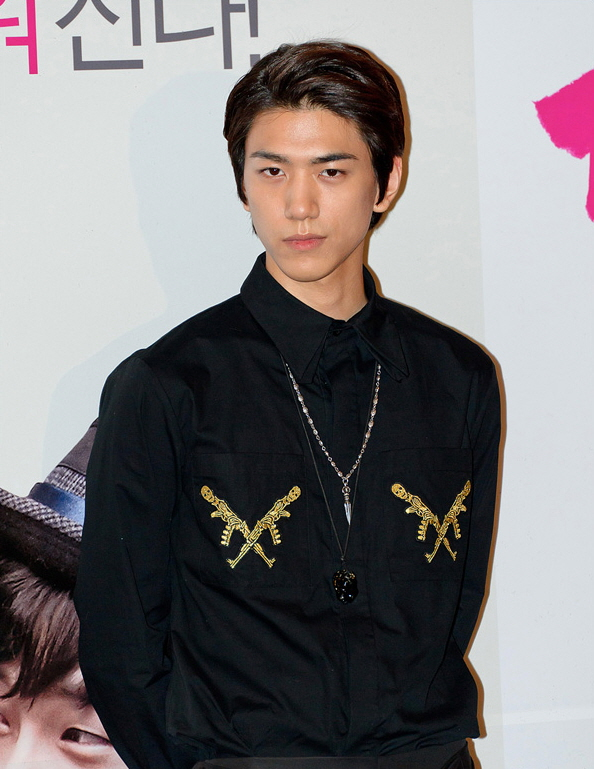
- Sung Joon in 2012
- Born: Bang Sung-Joon; July 10, 1990 (age 36); Seoul, South Korea
- Occupations: Actor; model
- Years active: 2011–present
- Agent: Gilstory ENT
- Spouse: Unknown (m. 2020)
- Children: 1

Korean name
- Hangul: 방성준
- Hanja: 方盛駿
- RR: Bang Seongjun
- MR: Pang Sŏngjun

Bang Sung-joon (born July 10, 1990), credited mononymously as Sung Joon, is a South Korean actor and model. He became best known for his leading roles in the television series Flower Band (2012), Can We Get Married? (2012) and I Need Romance 3 (2014). He also appeared in the films Dangerously Excited (2012), Horror Stories 2 (2013), Pluto (2013) and The Villainess (2017). His recent works include starring in web series Island (2022–2023) and Call lt Love (2023) as well as in the television series The Fiery Priest 2 (2024).

== Career ==
=== Beginnings ===
Sung Joon began his entertainment career as a model, but soon switched to acting and debuted in the drama White Christmas in 2011. The same year he was cast in a supporting role in Lie to Me. In 2012, he was cast in a leading role in the teen drama Flower Band, where he played a free-spirited leader of a rock band.

Sung Joon made his film debut with Dangerously Excited.

=== Mainstream acting ===
In 2013, Sung Joon was cast in a lead role in the romantic comedy drama Can We Get Married? opposite Jung So-min. The same year, he starred in his first historical drama, Gu Family Book. Sung also starred in the horror film Horror Stories 2 and in the high school thriller Pluto.

In 2014, he was cast in the third installment of TvN's romantic comedy I Need Romance 3 in which he portrayed the character of a care-free songwriter. Later that year he took on the role of a plastic surgeon for the drama Discovery of Love.

In 2015, Sung Joon was cast as the lead in mystery melodrama High Society, playing a man who succeeds in spite of his poor family background. That same year, he also had a supporting role in Hyde Jekyll, Me, a romantic comedy where he played a hypnosis specialist.

In 2016, Sung Joon played the male lead in the romantic comedy drama Madame Antoine: The Love Therapist alongside Han Ye-seul.

In 2017, Sung Joon starred in the mystery comedy, Ms. Perfect alongside Ko So-young, playing a lawyer.

In 2021, Sung Joon joined the film Ghost Mansion, making a comeback to the big screen four years after his discharge from military service.

== Personal life ==
Sung Joon maintains close friendships with fellow models-turned-actors Kim Young-kwang, Lee Soo-hyuk, Kim Woo-bin and Hong Jong-hyun – all of whom he worked onscreen with in White Christmas. They were given the nickname of "Model Avengers" by their fans.

Sung Joon quietly enlisted for his mandatory military service on December 18, 2018. He completed five weeks of basic training at the Army's 2nd Infantry Division in Gangwon Province. Before his enlistment, he was in a relationship with his non-celebrity girlfriend, with whom he had a child. In August 2020, Sung's agency O& Entertainment announced he would hold a private wedding on September 12, 2020.

== Filmography ==
=== Film ===
Year	Title	Role	Notes	Ref.
2012	Dangerously Excited	Min-ki		
2013	Horror Stories 2	Cho Dong-Wook	Segment Cliff	
2013	Pluto	Yoo Jin		
2017	One Day	Young-woo	Cameo	
2017	The Villainess	Jung Hyun-soo		
2021	Ghost Mansion	Ji-woo		
2027	K-Pop: The Debut	TBA		

=== Television series ===
Year	Title	Role	Notes	Ref.
2011	White Christmas	Choi Chi-hoon		
2011	Lie to Me	Hyun Sang-hee		
2012	Flower Band	Kwon Ji-hyuk		
2012	KBS Drama Special: "Wetlands Ecology Report"	Choi Goon	one-act drama	
2012	Can We Get Married?	Ha Jung-hoon		
2013	Gu Family Book	Gon		
2014	I Need Romance 3	Joo Wan		
2014	Discovery of Love	Nam Ha-jin		
2015	Hyde Jekyll, Me	Yoon Tae-Joo / Lee Soo-Hyun		
2015	High Society	Choi Joon-gi		
2016	Madame Antoine: The Love Therapist	Choi Soo-hyun		
2017	Ms. Perfect	Kang Bong-goo		
2021	Casting a Spell to You	Choi Ji-woo		
2022–2023	Island	Gung-tan		
2023	Call lt Love	Yoon Jun		
2024	The Fiery Priest 2	Kim Hong-sik		
2025	Butterfly	Sanghoon		
2025	The Scandal of Chunhwa	Park Chae-jun	Ep.1	
2026	Can This Love Be Translated?	Na Jin-seok (Joo Ho-jin's half brother)	Special appearance	
2026	Perfect Crown	I-hwan	Special appearance	

=== Television shows ===
Year	Title	Notes
2011	Show! K Music	MC
2013	Miracle Korea	MC

== Discography ==
=== Soundtrack appearances ===
Year	Song title	Notes
2012	"Jaywalking"	Flower Band OSTs
2012	"Wake Up"	Flower Band OSTs
2012	"Today"	Flower Band OSTs
2012	"Words You Shouldn't Know"	Flower Band OSTs
2014	"Love Is Smiling"	I Need Romance 3 OST

== Awards and nominations ==
Year	Award	Category	Nominated work	Result
2012	26th KBS Drama Awards	Excellence Award, Actor in a One-Act/Special/Short Drama	Wetlands Ecology Report	Won
2014	7th Style Icon Awards	New Icon	Himself	Won
2014	16th Seoul International Youth Film Festival	Best Actor	Gu Family Book; I Need Romance 3	Nominated
2014	28th KBS Drama Awards	Excellence Award, Actor in a Miniseries	Discovery of Love	Nominated
2015	23rd SBS Drama Awards	Excellence Award, Actor in a Miniseries	High Society	Nominated
2015	23rd SBS Drama Awards	Excellence Award, Actor in a Drama Special	Hyde Jekyll, Me	Nominated
2015	23rd SBS Drama Awards	Best Couple (with Uee)	High Society	Nominated
2016	tvN10 Awards	Romantic-Comedy King	I Need Romance 3	Nominated
2024	2024 SBS Drama Awards	Excellence Award, Actor in a Seasonal Drama	The Fiery Priest 2	Won
