= Chae-young =

- Hangul: 채영
- RR: Chaeyeong
- MR: Ch'aeyŏng
- IPA: [t͡ɕʰɛjʌŋ]

Chae-young (also spelled Chae-yeong) is a Korean given name.

People with this name include:

- Yoo Chae-yeong (1977–2014), South Korean singer and actress
- Han Chae-young (born 1980), South Korean actress
- Lee Chae-young (born 1986), South Korean actress
- Kang Chae-young (born 1996), South Korean archer
- Rosé (singer) (born Park Chae-young, 1997), New Zealand and South Korean singer, member of girl group Blackpink
- Chaeyoung (born Son Chae-young, 1999), South Korean singer and rapper, member of girl group Twice
- Isa (born Lee Chae-young, 2002), South Korean singer, member of girl group STAYC

== See also ==
- Chae-yeon
- List of Korean given names
