= Eun-bi =

- Hangul: 은비
- RR: Eunbi
- MR: Ŭnbi
- IPA: [ɯnbi]

Eun-bi is a Korean given name.

- Baek Eun-bi (born 1979), South Korean speed skater
- EunB (born Go Eun-bi, 1992–2014), South Korean singer, member of girl group Ladies' Code
- Lee Eun-bi (born 1990), South Korean handball player
- Cheon Eun-bi (born 1992), South Korean field hockey player
- Kwon Eun-bi (born 1995), South Korean singer
- Eunha (singer) (born Jung Eun-bi, 1997), South Korean singer, member of girl group Viviz
- SinB (born Hwang Eun-bi, 1998), South Korean female singer, member of girl group Viviz

Fictional characters with this name include:

- Go Eun-bi, in 2011 South Korean television series The Musical
- Yang Eun-bi, in 2011 South Korean television series Flower Boy Ramen Shop
- Jo Eun-bi, in 2014 South Korean television series Reset
- Lee Eun-bi, in 2015 South Korean television series School 2015

== See also ==
- List of Korean given names
