= List of 2020 box office number-one films in Taipei =

This is a list of films which have reached number one at the weekend box office in Taipei, Taiwan during 2020.

== Films ==
Demon Slayer: Kimetsu no Yaiba – The Movie: Mugen Train became the highest grossing film of 2020 despite never reaching #1.

Week	Weekend end date	Film	Weekend gross (in 10,000 New Taiwan Dollar)	Cumulative box office (in 10,000 New Taiwan Dollar)	Openings in the Top 10
1	January 5, 2020	Ashfall	$466	$2,092	
2	January 12, 2020	Ashfall	$298	$2,637	Bombshell (#2); Patients of a Saint (#9)
3	January 19, 2020	Bad Boys for Life	$1,045	$1,325	Just Mercy (#3)
4	January 26, 2020	Bad Boys for Life	$593	$2,719	Dolittle (#2); Spies in Disguise (#3); Underwater (#4); The Gentlemen (#5); Little Women (#6); Enter the Fat Dragon (#7)
5	February 2, 2020	1917	$652	$781	Dark Waters (#9); Red Shoes and the Seven Dwarfs (#10)
6	February 9, 2020	Birds of Prey	$1,071	$1,457	Kumanthong (#6)
7	February 16, 2020	Birds of Prey	$554	$2,641	Secret Zoo (#3); Fantasy Island (#4); A Rainy Day in New York (#7)
8	February 23, 2020	Sonic the Hedgehog	$301	$301	The Closet (#5); Richard Jewell (#7); The Platform (#10)
9	March 1, 2020	The Invisible Man	$491	$594	The Call of the Wild (#3); Saezuru Tori wa Habatakanai: The Clouds Gather (#6); Goblin Slayer: Goblin's Crown (#8)
10	March 8, 2020	The Invisible Man	$356	$1,225	Hitman: Agent Jun (#3); Mr. Zoo: The Missing VIP (#5); Gretel & Hansel (#9); Emma (#10)
11	March 15, 2020	Bloodshot	$670	$830	Acting Out of Love (#4); The Shawshank Redemption (#5); Saekano the Movie: Finale (#6); The Last Full Measure (#8)
12	March 22, 2020	Bloodshot	$211	$1,289	I Still Believe (#7); Booksmart (#10)
13	March 29, 2020	Bloodshot	$79	$1,462	Line of Duty (#2); Brahms: The Boy II (#3); Beasts Clawing at Straws (#4); Re:Zero − Starting Life in Another World (#5); Resistance (#6)
14	April 5, 2020	My Hero Academia: Heroes Rising	$77	$150	Howling Village (#2); My Spy (#3); Trolls World Tour (#5)
15	April 12, 2020	I See You	$58	$58	Made in Abyss: Dawn of the Deep Soul (#3); Honest Candidate (#5); The Truth (#6); Military Wives (#10)
16	April 19, 2020	Invasion	$63	$63	Her Blue Sky (#5); Radioactive (#6); Escape from Pretoria (#8); Dreambuilders (#10)
17	April 26, 2020	Digimon Adventure: Last Evolution Kizuna	$72	$72	The Queen of Black Magic (#2); La Belle Époque (#5); The Battle of Jangsari (#6); Kamen Rider Reiwa: The First Generation (#8)
18	May 3, 2020	Digimon Adventure: Last Evolution Kizuna	$119	$267	Bad Education (#2); Inheritance (#3); Low Season (#4); Cutoff (#5); Flu (#6)
19	May 10, 2020	Digimon Adventure: Last Evolution Kizuna	$94	$466	The Blackout (#3); Shirobako: The Movie (#5); My Prince Edward (#9)
20	May 17, 2020	The Last Emperor	$128	$128	Tunnelen (#3); Lingering (#4); The Cave (#6)
21	May 24, 2020	Onward	$248	$248	Survive the Night (#4); The Unthinkable (#5); Not Quite Dead Yet (#9); Stare (#10)
22	May 31, 2020	Onward	$253	$635	The Dark Knight (#3); 10 Minutes Gone (#5); Batman Begins (#6); Misbehaviour (#7); The Collini Case (#8); The Dark Knight Rises (#9); I Can Quit Whenever I Want (#10)
23	June 7, 2020	Onward	$190	$918	Intruder (#2); Pee Nak 2 (#5); Damage (#6); Ohong Village (#10)
24	June 14, 2020	Onward	$169	$1,167	Sea Fever (#3); Blade Runner: The Final Cut (#5); Vivarium (#8); Downhill (#9); Casablanca (#10)
25	June 21, 2020	Onward	$115	$1,334	The Postcard Killings (#2); The Eagle Shooting Heroes (#3); Hero (#4); Blood Quantum (#6); Ashes of Time (#8); Eclipse (#9)
26	June 28, 2020	Onward	$140	$1,569	The Outpost (#2); Akira (#3); The High Note (#4); 49 Days (#6); Fukushima 50 (#7); Dreamkatcher (#9); Mortal (#10)
27	July 5, 2020	Leaving Virginia	$124	$124	Ghosts of War (#3); Legally Declared Dead (#6); The Maid (#8); Kaiji: Final Game (#9)
28	July 12, 2020	Sumikko Gurashi the Movie	$452	$466	The Secret Garden (#5); Capone (#7); The Silence of the Lambs (#10)
29	July 19, 2020	Peninsula	$2,397	$3,486	A Choo (#2); Perfect Blue (#4); Innocence (#6)
30	July 26, 2020	Peninsula	$1,334	$6,053	Yummy (#7); The Rental (#8); Ireesha, The Daughter of Elf-king (#9)
31	August 2, 2020	Peninsula	$588	$7,234	Unhinged (#2); Steel Rain 2: Summit (#3); Vic the Viking and the Magic Sword (#7); The Vigil (#10)
32	August 9, 2020	Peninsula	$271	$7,750	I WeirDO (#2); Ava (#3); Girl's Revenge (#7); Letto numero 6 (#9); Memento (#10)
33	August 16, 2020	Greenland	$637	$859	Fate/stay night: Heaven's Feel III. spring song (#3); Get the Hell Out (#5); Inception (#6); Do You Love Me as I Love You (#7); Deliver Us from Evil (#8)
34	August 23, 2020	Do You Love Me as I Love You	$451	$558	Tokyo Godfathers (#9)
35	August 30, 2020	Tenet	$2,578	$3,110	The New Mutants (#3); Malasaña 32 (#7); Suzhou River (#10)
36	September 6, 2020	Tenet	$2,094	$6,738	Mulan (#2); Okay Madam (#7); Leatherface (#10)
37	September 13, 2020	Tenet	$1,387	$9,198	Break the Silence: The Movie (#5); Abyssal (#6); Antebellum (#7); Crayon Shin-chan: Crash! Rakuga Kingdom and Almost Four Heroes (#9)
38	September 20, 2020	Tenet	$801	$10,526	Beauty Water (#2); My Missing Valentins (#4); Rogue (#7); I'm Livin' It (#8)
39	September 27, 2020	Tenet	$528	$11,371	Doraemon: Nobita's New Dinosaur (#3)
40	October 4, 2020	Your Name Engraved Herein	$428	$1,053	Violet Evergarden: The Movie (#4); The War with Grandpa (#5); Coma (#7); Vanguard (#9)
41	October 11, 2020	Honest Thief	$526	$640	Pawn (#9); Cells at Work! (#10)
42	October 18, 2020	Your Name Engraved Herein	$296	$2,305	The Silent Forest (#2); The Doorman (#6); Blind Witness (#10)

== See also ==
- List of highest-grossing films in Taiwan
