= Hyde Jekyll, Me =

2015 South Korean television series

- Promotional poster
- Also known as: Hyde, Jekyll and I
- Genre: Romance; Comedy; Drama
- Based on: Dr. Jekyll Is Mr. Hyde by Lee Choong-ho
- Written by: Kim Ji-woon
- Directed by: Jo Young-kwang
- Starring: Hyun Bin; Han Ji-min; Sung Joon; Lee Hye-ri
- Country of origin: South Korea
- Original language: Korean
- No. of episodes: 20

Production
- Executive producer: Lee Yong-suk (SBS)
- Producers: Hong Eui; Jang Jin-wook
- Running time: 75 minutes
- Production companies: ONDA Entertainment; KPJ (Note: Acquired by and became a subsidiary of Studio Dragon in September 2016)

Original release
- Network: SBS TV
- Release: January 21 – March 26, 2015

Hyde Jekyll, Me (Korean: 하이드 지킬, 나) is a 2015 South Korean television series starring Hyun Bin and Han Ji-min. It is based on Lee Choong-ho's webtoon Dr. Jekyll Is Mr. Hyde (지킬박사는 하이드씨), which gave a romantic comedy spin on the literary character. The series aired from January 21 to March 26, 2015 on SBS's Wednesdays and Thursdays at 21:55 (KST) for 20 episodes and received generally negative reviews from critics.

== Synopsis ==
Gu Seo-jin (Hyun Bin), is a third-generation chaebol who runs the theme park Wonder Land. He seemingly has everything — looks, brains, and fortune. He is also in line to become the next CEO of Wonder Group, the conglomerate his family owns, though his cousin Ryu Seung-yeon (Han Sang-jin), who oversees Wonder Hotel is his rival for the position. But Seo-jin has dissociative identity disorder. Whenever his heart rate exceeds 150, another personality emerges, and unlike Seo-jin's usual cold, cynical and ruthless self, Robin is kind, gentle and has a savior complex. This split personality began 15 years ago, and Seo-jin's doctor Kang Hee-ae believes that Robin is a manifestation of his guilt regarding a traumatic incident then. Because of this, Seo-jin avoids anything that might cause him to have a strong physical or emotional reaction which could trigger Robin's reappearance, even if that means shutting himself away from the world and eschewing any meaningful relationships.

Jang Ha-na (Han Ji-min), has just returned to Korea after spending several years in the United States with Cirque du Soleil. Like her grandfather and father before her, she is set to take over as circus master of the circus show at Wonder Land, which had once been the park's primary attraction. Ha-na vows to save the failing circus and dreams of revamping it back to its former glory, but she finds herself butting heads with Seo-jin, who wants to get rid of it due to low ticket sales and high overhead costs. But with every antagonistic encounter with Ha-na, Seo-jin notes the alarming spike on his heart monitor, and the two become further embroiled with each other. After Dr. Kang tells Seo-jin that she has found a cure for his condition, she gets kidnapped by a mysterious assailant who almost succeeds in killing Ha-na, making her the only witness. However, the traumatic experience has caused Ha-na to block out the man's face, and she goes to Dr. Kang's student, hypnotherapist Yoon Tae-joo (Sung Joon), to help her remember. With Ha-na's life in danger, the more Robin appears and the more she falls for him, to Seo-jin's dismay.

== Cast ==
=== Main ===
- Hyun Bin as Gu Seo-jin / Robin
- Han Ji-min as Jang Ha-na
  - Jung Ji-so as young Jang Ha-na
- Sung Joon as Yoon Tae-joo / Lee Soo-hyun
- Lee Hye-ri as Min Woo-jung

=== Supporting ===
- Lee Seung-joon as Kwon Young-chan
- Han Sang-jin as Ryu Seung-yeon
- Hwang Min-ho as Ahn Sung-geun
- Shin Eun-jung as Kang Hee-ae
- Lee Deok-hwa as Gu Myung-han
- Kim Do-yeon as Han Joo-hee
- Kwak Hee-sung as Sung Suk-won
- Lee Se-na as Choi Seo-hee
- Lee Jun-hyeok as Detective Na
- Moon Yeong-dong as Park Hee-bong
- Lee Won-keun as Lee Eun-chang
- Oh Na-ra as Cha Jin-joo
- Maeng Sang-hoon as Director Min
- Kim Ji-eun as Myung-han's secretary
- Heo Jung-eun

== Original soundtrack ==
Hyde Jekyll, Me OST

Soundtrack album by Various artists
- Recorded: 2015
- Genre: Soundtrack
- Languages: Korean; English
- Labels: CJ E&M; MAYS Entertainment

=== Part 1 ===
Released on January 22, 2015
No.	Title	Artist	Length
1.	"Falling" (떨어지는)	Park Bo-ram	4:32
2.	"Falling" (Inst.)		4:32
Total length:			8:54

=== Part 2 ===
Released on January 28, 2015
No.	Title	Artist	Length
1.	"Because of You" (당신때문에)	Baek Ji-young	4:00
2.	"Because of You" (Inst.)		4:00
Total length:			8:00

=== Part 3 ===
Released on February 4, 2015
No.	Title	Artist	Length
1.	"Embrace" (품)	Yoon Hyun-sang	3:37
2.	"Embrace" (Inst.)		3:37
Total length:			7:54

=== Part 4 ===
Released on February 12, 2015
No.	Title	Artist	Length
1.	"Wonderful World" (멋진 세계)	J Rabbit	3:26
2.	"Wonderful World" (Inst.)		3:26
Total length:			6:52

=== Part 5 ===
Released on February 18, 2015
No.	Title	Artist	Length
1.	"Only You" (오직너만)	Kim Bum-soo	3:35
2.	"Only You" (Inst.)		3:35
Total length:			7:50

=== Part 6 ===
Released on February 25, 2015
No.	Title	Artist	Length
1.	"Maybe" (어쩌면)	Epitone Project and Lucia	3:53
2.	"Maybe" (Inst.)		3:53
Total length:			7:06

=== Part 7 ===
Released on March 12, 2015
No.	Title	Artist	Length
1.	"Hyde Jekyll" (하이듲킬)	Snuper	4:12
2.	"Hyde Jekyll" (Inst.)		4:12
Total length:			8:24

== Reception ==
The series received low percentage of ratings for a prime-time television series. It received mainly negative reviews, particularly for its inconsistent plot.

=== Ratings ===
Ep.	Original broadcast date	Average audience share			
Ep.	Original broadcast date	Nielsen Korea		TNmS	
Ep.	Original broadcast date	Nationwide	Seoul	Nationwide	Seoul
1	January 21, 2015	8.6%	9.6%	10.2%	13.2%
2	January 22, 2015	8.0%	8.6%	8.8%	11.7%
3	January 28, 2015	7.4%	8.6%	7.2%	8.5%
4	January 29, 2015	6.6%	7.1%	7.7%	8.6%
5	February 4, 2015	5.9%	6.3%	6.2%	6.6%
6	February 5, 2015	5.3%	5.4%	6.7%	6.8%
7	February 11, 2015	5.1%	5.2%	5.5%	5.6%
8	February 12, 2015	6.2%	7.0%	6.9%	7.7%
9	February 18, 2015	4.7%	5.0%	5.4%	5.7%
10	February 19, 2015	5.4%	5.3%	5.5%	5.6%
11	February 25, 2015	5.6%	6.4%	4.9%	5.7%
12	February 26, 2015	5.2%	5.6%	5.7%	6.1%
13	March 4, 2015	3.8%	4.1%	4.0%	4.3%
14	March 5, 2015	4.7%	4.6%	5.3%	5.4%
15	March 11, 2015	3.8%	3.2%	3.9%	4.5%
16	March 12, 2015	3.9%	3.5%	5.1%	5.5%
17	March 18, 2015	3.5%	3.9%	3.6%	4.5%
18	March 19, 2015	4.4%	3.3%	4.5%	5.3%
19	March 25, 2015	3.4%	3.6%	3.4%	3.6%
20	March 26, 2015	4.3%	4.6%	4.7%	5.6%
Average		5.3%	5.6%	5.8%	6.5%
In the table above, the blue numbers represent the lowest ratings and the red numbers represent the highest ratings.

== Controversies ==
Author Lee Choong-ho, who in 2011 wrote the webtoon Hyde Jekyll, Me was adapted from, alleged on his Twitter account that the screenwriter of Kill Me, Heal Me plagiarized his work. Both TV series are about a woman who falls in love with a man with dissociative identity disorder, and air in the same time slot. MBC denied the plagiarism accusation, while SBS clarified that Lee's statement was his personal opinion and did not reflect the stance of the whole production team.

Thailand's Channel 3 television drama Song Huajai Nee Puea Tur received criticism that its plot was too similar to Hyde. However, the producer insisted that there was no plagiarism involved.
