= Yoo Min-kyu =

South Korean actor (born 1987)

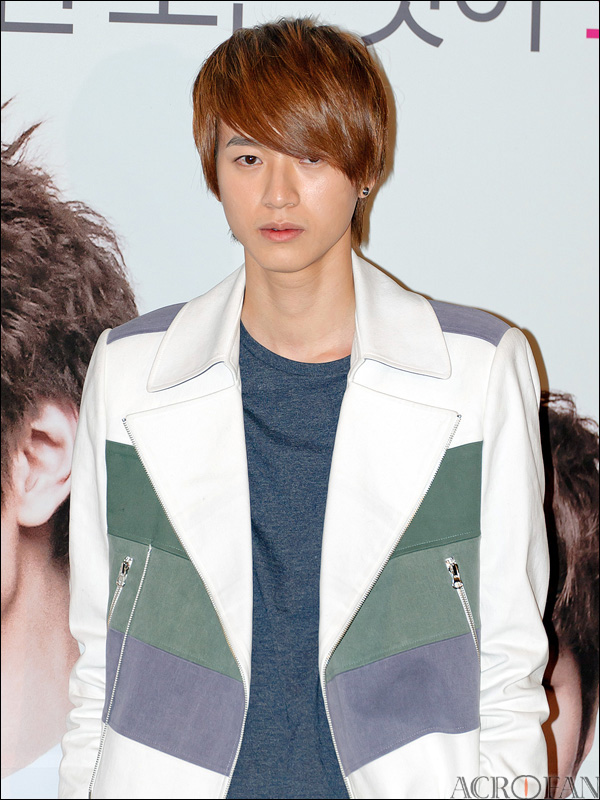
- Yoo in 2012
- Born: September 18, 1987 (age 39); Seoul, South Korea
- Occupation: Actor
- Years active: 2006–present
- Agent: Lead Entertainment

Korean name
- Hangul: 유민규
- RR: Yu Mingyu
- MR: Yu Min'gyu

Yoo Min-kyu (born September 18, 1987) is a South Korean actor.

== Career ==
Yoo began working as a runway and magazine model in 2006. He then joined and won the audition competition Flower Boy Casting: Oh! Boy in 2011, which led to his acting debut in the television series Flower Band in 2012. In 2014, Yoo played leading roles in Kim Jho Gwangsoo's indie film One Night (part of the omnibus One Night Only), and another cable series Be Arrogant.

On December 23, 2021, Yoo decided not to renew the contract with Management SOOP. On January 24, 2022, it was announced that Yoo had signed an exclusive contract with Lead Entertainment.

== Filmography ==
=== Television series ===
Year	Title	Role
2012	Flower Band	Kim Ha-jin
2012	To the Beautiful You	Jo Young-man
2013	Master's Sun	Ji-woo (guest, episode 5)
2013	KBS Drama Special: "Na-ra's Rain"	Son Woo-ki
2013	Shining Romance	Kang Ki-joon
2014	Cheo Yong	Park Min-jae
2014	Dodohara (Be Arrogant)	Noh Chul
2017	Queen for Seven Days	Ki Ryong
2017	Live Up to Your Name	Yoo Jae-ha
2019	Black Dog: Being A Teacher	Ji Hae-won
2020–2021	Mr. Queen	Prince Yeongpyeong

=== Film ===
Year	Title	Role	Notes
2014	One Night Only	Geun-ho	segment: "One Night"
2020	Ensemble	Min-woo	

=== Variety show ===
Year	Title	Notes
2011	Flower Boy Casting: Oh Boy!	Contestant

=== Music video appearances ===
Year	Song title	Artist
2013	"You"	Monday Kiz

== Theater ==
Year	Title	Role
2012–2013	Kisaragi Miki-chan	Iyemoto
