= Shut Up & Let's Go =

2012 South Korean television series

- Promotional poster
- Also known as: Shut Up & Let's Go
- Genre: Teen; Romance; Music
- Written by: Seo Yoon-hee
- Directed by: Lee Kwon
- Starring: Sung Joon; Jo Bo-ah; Kim Myung-soo; Jung Eui-chul; Kim Min-seok; Yoo Min-kyu; Lee Hyun-jae
- Opening theme: Wake Up
- Country of origin: South Korea
- No. of episodes: 16

Production
- Producers: Jo Moon-joo; Park Seong-hye
- Production companies: Oh!Boy Project; CJ E&M

Original release
- Network: tvN
- Release: January 30 – March 20, 2012

Related
- Cool Guys, Hot Ramen; Flower Boys Next Door; Dating Agency: Cyrano

Flower Band (Korean: 닥치고 꽃미남 밴드; RR: Dakchigo kkonminam baendeu; lit. 'Shut Up and Flower Boy Band') is a 2012 South Korean television series starring Sung Joon, Jo Bo-ah, Kim Myung-soo, Jung Eui-chul, Lee Hyun-jae, Yoo Min-kyu, and Kim Min-seok. It is a coming-of-age story about a high school rock band dealing with friendship, rivalry, romance and their passion for music. The series aired on tvN from January 30 to March 20, 2012, on Mondays and Tuesdays at 23:00 (KST) for 16 episodes.

The series is the second installment of tvN's "Oh! Boy" series of Flower Boy programming targeted at the teenage demographic, preceded by Flower Boy Ramyun Shop in 2011 and followed with Flower Boys Next Door in 2013 and Dating Agency: Cyrano in 2014.

Yoo Min-kyu was cast after winning tvN's reality audition program Flower Boy Casting: Oh! Boy. Kim Myung-soo is from boy band Infinite, Lee Hyun-jae is from indie rock band Mate, Kim Min-seok and Kim Ye-rim were contestants on reality talent show Superstar K3.

== Synopsis ==
Joo Byung-hee (Lee Min-ki) is the crazy, free-spirited leader and vocalist of the popular underground rock group, Eye Candy. Joining him is Kwon Ji-hyuk (Sung Joon), chic Lee Hyun-soo (L), playboy Kim Ha-jin (Yoo Min-kyu), silent Jang Do-il (Lee Hyun-jae) and baby-faced Seo Kyung-jong (Kim Min-seok). When their delinquent-ridden school is forced to close down, they debate whether it's even worth returning to high school at all. However, due to an outside confrontation with their new school's current ruling band, Strawberry Fields, Eye Candy decides to attend Jungsang High out of spite so they can rule the school once again. Joo Byung-Hee finds his muse in Jungsang High School and dreams of performing in a music festival. They overcome their various economic difficulties to earn themselves the Jungsang High School uniform and finally are able to enter. By taking inspiration from his blossoming relationship, Byung-hee finally finishes his composition for the festival. Tensions flare between Eye Candy and Strawberry Fields, leading to violent encounters.

When Byung-Hee receives an apology from the members of Strawberry Fields and an offer to replace the drum kit that they had previously wrecked, he goes alone to collect the kit. The members of Strawberry Fields instead take the opportunity to attack Byung-hee and beat him with a metal rod, including giving him a serious head wound. Ji-hyuk, Hyun-soo, Ha-jin, Do-il and Kyung-jong discover the situation and reach Byung-hee, only to witness his death as he is struck by a truck as he staggers across a road to reach them.

The story of Eye Candy is forced to continue without their impulsive leader as they struggle to realise their and Byung-hee's dreams.

== Cast ==
=== Main ===
- Sung Joon as Kwon Ji-hyuk

Position: Leader, Vocals, Guitarist
The automatic leader of Eye Candy after Joo Byung-hee's death. He fell in love with Im Soo-ah but keeps their relationship hidden from his bandmates as he feels that he is betraying Byung-hee. He was raised by his grandparents after his mother abandoned him as child.

- Jo Bo-ah as Im Soo-ah

She is the soft-spoken daughter of a wealthy businessman who's gone bankrupt. As a result, she is forced to move to a poorer neighborhood and coincidentally lives across Kwon Ji-hyuk. She receives a lot of help from him throughout her difficult times and their relationship develops. She is Yoo Seung-hoon's childhood friend, and Joo Byung-hee's muse.

- Kim Myung-soo as Lee Hyun-soo

Position: Guitarist
Nicknamed the Ice Prince. Lee Hyun-soo tends to have a short temper and comes off as a mean guy. He spends majority of his time practicing his guitar skills while caring for his little sister.

- Lee Hyun-jae as Jang Do-il

Position: Drummer
Jang Do-il is the son of a powerful mob boss. Unlike his father, he is quiet, kind, and perhaps overly serious. Do-il keeps his private life hidden, which leads people to believe that he is very mysterious. He has a secret, one-sided crush on Bang Woo-kyung.

- Yoo Min-kyu as Kim Ha-jin

Position: Bassist
He is a notorious playboy and claims he joined the band in order to meet girls. Ha-jin has a crush on Kim Ye-rim, however his feelings are not reciprocated.

- Kim Min-seok as Seo Kyung-jong

Position: Keyboard
He claims that he joined the band in order to earn money. He is the shortest out of all the members and appears to be younger though they are all in the same grade. He is funny and kind, sometimes noisy and brings much cheer to the group. Although all the band members are close, Kyung-jong's best friend is Kim Ha-jin.

=== Supporting ===
- Jung Eui-chul as Yoo Seung-hoon

Yoo Seung-hoon is the leader and pianist of Strawberry Fields, and rival of Eye Candy. He has been friends with Im Soo-ah since childhood, and has had a crush on her for a long time. Finding it hard to accept that Soo-ah only likes him as a friend, he becomes jealous of Kwon Ji-hyuk.

- Lee Min-ki as Joo Byung-hee

Position: Leader, Vocals, Guitarist
The original leader of Eye Candy. He is charismatic and in the beginning, is the soul of Eye Candy. He met his demise after being hit by a truck during a fight involving Strawberry Fields and himself.

- Kim Jung-min as Bang Woo-kyung

A longtime friend and support to the band, she has a crush on Kwon Ji-hyuk and always sticks up for his interests even if it means blaming the rest of the band.

- Kim Ye-rim as Ye-rim

A solo artist at the same agency as Eye Candy. After her car almost hits Lee Hyun-soo, causing his hand to be cut by a glass shard, she develops a crush on him.

- Kim In-seo as Yoo Hae-ri

Yoo Seung-hoon's elder sister. She is the CEO of HR Entertainment, the agency which signs Eye Candy.

- Ma Dong-seok as Teacher / Silba
- Kim C as Rock Kim

Rock legend. Also a close friend of Silba's.

- Kwak Jung-wook as Jung Maro

Strawberry Fields' guitarist. Has a logical personality, to the point of being unfeeling.

- Kim Hyun-joon as Park Pyo-joo

Strawberry Fields' bassist. He hired bodyguards to beat up Joo Byung-hee, which led to Byung-hee getting hit by a truck as he's running away. He fears revenge from the Eye Candy boys, but Yoo Seung-hoon snaps him out of it and he once again becomes a cocky jerk.

- Kim Hyo-suk as Strawberry Fields' drummer
- Jung Jin-an as Jo Deo-mi

Im Soo-ah's best friend. It is hinted that she may like Yoo Seung-hoon because she keeps urging Soo-ah to date him.

- --- as Lee Da-som

Lee Hyun-soo's younger sister who suffers from a serious illness. She needs constant medical attention and Hyun-soo takes on the responsibility of caring for her while their parents work during the night. She is very fond of Kwon Ji-hyuk.

- Dong Hyun-bae as Sharks gang boss
- Kim Sung-hoon as Jang Do-il's father.

He is a well-respected underground triad leader.

- Yum Jung-ah as Kwon Ji-hyuk's mother (cameo, ep 15)

She abandoned Ji-hyuk when he was a child, and their relationship is very distant.

- Kim Min-young as Eun-in

== Original soundtrack ==
Flower Band: Original Sound Track

Soundtrack album by Various Artists
- Released: March 22, 2012
- Genre: Pop, K-pop, soundtrack, rock
- Label: CJ E&M

No.	Title	Artist	Length
1.	"Wake Up" (Prologue)	Lee Je-hak
2.	"Not in Love"	Lee Min-ki	3:58
3.	"Jaywalking" (무단횡단)	Sung Joon	3:34
4.	"How Come" (어쩌다 널)	Kim Min-seok	4:10
5.	"Wake Up"	Sung Joon	3:45
6.	"Love U Like U"	L & Kim Ye-rim	3:15
7.	"Today" (오늘은)	Sung Joon	2:40
8.	"Two Months" (소녀곡예사)	Kim Ye-rim	3:12
9.	"Words You Shouldn't Know" (몰라야 할 말)	Sung Joon	3:06
10.	"Dear Friend" (Epilogue)	Lee Sang-hoon

The song "Not in Love" is a cover, originally sung by Platinum Blonde, and made popular again by Crystal Castles.

== International broadcast ==
In Japan, it aired on Mnet Japan beginning April 2012. It was rebroadcast from April to May 2014 on cable channel LaLaTV.
