= Discovery of Love =

- Promotional poster
- Also known as: Discovery of Romance; Finding True Love
- Genre: Romance; Drama; Comedy
- Written by: Jung Hyun-jung
- Directed by: Kim Sung-yoon; Lee Eung-bok
- Starring: Jung Yu-mi; Eric Mun; Sung Joon
- Country of origin: South Korea
- Original language: Korean
- No. of episodes: 16

Production
- Executive producer: Ham Young-hoon
- Producers: Kim Hyung-seok; Park Woo-ram
- Production location: Korea
- Running time: 70 minutes
- Production company: JS Pictures

Original release
- Network: KBS2
- Release: 18 August – 7 October 2014

Discovery of Love (Korean: 연애의 발견; RR: Yeonaeui balgyeon) is a 2014 South Korean television series starring Jung Yu-mi, Eric Mun, and Sung Joon. It aired on KBS2 from August 18 to October 7, 2014, on Mondays and Tuesdays at 21:55 for 16 episodes.

== Plot ==
Han Yeo-reum (Jung Yu-mi) is a furniture designer who owns a workshop space that she shares with other designers. For the past year, she's been dating Nam Ha-jin (Sung Joon), a plastic surgeon with a sweet and gentle personality. But Yeo-reum's peaceful existence is shaken when her ex-boyfriend Kang Tae-ha (Eric Mun) suddenly reappears in her life. The CEO of an interior design company, Tae-ha is a smart, confident man with a strong competitive edge who always gets what he wants. Meanwhile, Ha-jin comes across Ahn Ah-rim (Yoon Jin-yi), whom he recognizes as the girl he treated like a sister when they were both children living in an orphanage. As she begins working with Tae-ha, Yeo-reum is forced to re-evaluate her romantic history, which sets her off on a search for true love.

== Cast ==
- Jung Yu-mi as Han Yeo-reum
- Eric Mun as Kang Tae-ha
- Sung Joon as Nam Ha-jin
- Yoon Jin-yi as Ahn Ah-rim
- Yoon Hyun-min as Do Joon-ho
- Kim Seul-gi as Yoon Sol
- Kim Hye-ok as Shin Yoon-hee
- Ahn Suk-hwan as Bae Min-soo
- Lee Seung-joon as Yoon Jung-mok
- Sung Byung-sook as Ha-jin's mother
- Gu Won as Choi Eun-kyu
- Jung Soo-young as Jang Gi-eun
- Nam Kyung-eup as Han Jae-shik
- Choi Hee as Ha-jin's blind date
- Park Ah-in as Da-yeon
- Jung Yoon-seok as Han Woo-joo
- Lee Moon-sik as Taxi driver (recurring cameo)
- Jung Joo-ri as Plastic surgery patient (cameo, ep 2)
- Cha Yu-ram as Tae-ha's billiards instructor (cameo, ep 4)
- Ahn Gil-kang as Man holding boxes of accessories (cameo, ep 5)
- Yoo Ah-in as Woodworking class student (cameo, ep 16)

== Production ==
This was the second acting collaboration of Jung Yu-mi and Eric Mun, seven years after Que Sera, Sera in 2007. Jung and Sung Joon had also previously worked with screenwriter Jung Hyun-jung on I Need Romance 2012 (2012) and I Need Romance 3 (2014), respectively.

It was also Mun's first television series three years since Spy Myung-wol (2011), about which he explained, "There was the period when I was at the army and also the period I promoted with Shinhwa. It wasn't that I was purposely not appearing in any dramas, but Shinhwa promotions were important. I also think I didn't discover a project that I really wanted to do."

== Original soundtrack ==
The original soundtrack for Discovery of Love was released on November 4, 2014 by Kakao Entertainment and Donuts Music.

Discovery of Love OST
No.	Title	Artist	Length
1.	"Special Love" (별 일 아니에요)	Sweet Sorrow	3:04
2.	"Is It Love?" (사랑일까?)	J Rabbit	3:05
3.	"Turn Back Time" (시간을 거슬러)	One More Chance	3:18
4.	"It's Strange, With You" (묘해, 너와)	Acoustic Collabo	3:50
5.	"Bluebird" (파랑새)	Elaine	4:09
6.	"Overly Missing You" (너무 보고싶어)	Acoustic Collabo	4:04
7.	"One Love" (그 한 사람)	Lee Seung-hwan	4:08
8.	"Goodbye" (굿바이)	Starlovefish and Kim Il-jin	3:25
9.	"Like a Child" (어린애처럼)	Shin Hye-sung	3:26
10.	"It's All About You"	Darrelle London	3:10
11.	"It's Strange, With You" (묘해, 너와; Full Session)	Acoustic Collabo	3:49
Total length:			39:37

== Ratings ==
Despite the single-digit television ratings, the drama recorded ratings as high as 31.3% on Tving, a mobile and internet streaming site for live television. This figure was more than double the percentage of its competition. However these figures are not included in TNmS or AGB Nielsen ratings.

Episode	Broadcast date	Title	Average audience share			
Episode	Broadcast date	Title	TNmS Ratings		AGB Nielsen	
Episode	Broadcast date	Title	Nationwide	Seoul	Nationwide	Seoul
1	2014-08-18	How did we end up sleeping in the same bed?	5.0%	5.2%	6.3%	7.1%
2	2014-08-19	Will you break up with him and come back to me?	5.3%	5.8%	6.3%	7.3%
3	2014-08-25	Can't help it if you think it's jealousy	4.6%	5.2%	5.6%	6.2%
4	2014-08-26	You like Han Yeo-reum?	5.2%	5.9%	6.2%	7.0%
5	2014-09-01	I know that it's a confession I'll regret tomorrow!	7.1%	8.5%	7.6%	9.3%
6	2014-09-02	Even if the sky falls, I'm not going to you	5.6%	6.5%	6.6%	7.8%
7	2014-09-08	This is your first one-sided love, isn't it?	6.3%	8.7%	7.3%	7.9%
8	2014-09-09	This isn't dating; it's war	6.7%	7.5%	7.7%	8.4%
9	2014-09-15	I said "I love you" hundreds of times...	6.2%	7.0%	6.9%	7.5%
10	2014-09-16	Let's break up...	6.6%	8.1%	7.2%	7.8%
11	2014-09-22	Staring out the window several times a day	5.4%	6.1%	6.8%	7.6%
12	2014-09-23	The day the words "I love you" touched my heart...	6.0%	7.0%	7.6%	8.6%
13	2014-09-29	Should I act drunk and just kiss you?	7.2%	7.4%	7.6%	8.6%
14	2014-09-30	Did you just call me a bitch?	6.8%	8.0%	7.7%	8.4%
15	2014-10-06	Will they be able to love again?	7.4%	7.5%	7.5%	8.3%
16	2014-10-07	Although there's no such thing as everlasting love...	7.2%	9.5%	7.6%	8.3%
Average			6.1%	7.1%	7.0%	7.9%

== Awards and nominations ==
Year	Award	Category	Recipient	Result
2014	3rd APAN Star Awards	Best New Actress	Kim Seul-gi	Won
2014	KBS Drama Awards	Top Excellence Award, Actor	Eric Mun	Nominated
2014	KBS Drama Awards	Top Excellence Award, Actress	Jung Yu-mi	Nominated
2014	KBS Drama Awards	Excellence Award, Actor in a Miniseries	Eric Mun	Won
2014	KBS Drama Awards	Excellence Award, Actor in a Miniseries	Sung Joon	Nominated
2014	KBS Drama Awards	Excellence Award, Actress in a Miniseries	Jung Yu-mi	Won
2014	KBS Drama Awards	Best New Actor	Yoon Hyun-min	Nominated
2014	KBS Drama Awards	Best New Actress	Kim Seul-gi	Won
2014	KBS Drama Awards	Netizen Award, Actor	Eric Mun	Won
2014	KBS Drama Awards	Netizen Award, Actress	Jung Yu-mi	Won
2014	KBS Drama Awards	Best Couple Award	Eric Mun and Jung Yu-mi	Won
2015	48th WorldFest-Houston International Film Festival	Gold Remi for TV Series Comedy	Discovery of Love	Won
2015	51st Baeksang Arts Awards	Popular Actor (TV)	Eric Mun	Nominated
2015	51st Baeksang Arts Awards	Popular Actress (TV)	Jung Yu-mi	Nominated
2015	51st Baeksang Arts Awards	Best New Actress (TV)	Kim Seul-gi	Nominated
2015	36th Banff World Media Festival	Rockie Award, Melodrama category	Discovery of Love	Won

== Webtoon adaptation ==
The webtoon adaptation of the series was confirmed. The series has created a fandom to the point where it has been called the "standard of romantic comedy" until now. Interest is gathered in how the charm of the refreshing romantic comedy genre will be conveyed through the webtoon adaptation.
