= White Christmas (TV series) =

2011 South Korean television series

- Promotional poster
- Genre: Mystery, Thriller
- Written by: Park Yeon-seon
- Directed by: Kim Yong-soo
- Starring: Kim Sang-kyung; Baek Sung-hyun; Kim Young-kwang; Lee Soo-hyuk
- Country of origin: South Korea
- Original language: Korean
- No. of episodes: 8

Production
- Production location: Korea
- Running time: Sundays at 23:15 (KST)

Original release
- Network: Korean Broadcasting System
- Release: 30 January – 20 March 2011

Related
- Drama Special Series

White Christmas (Korean: 화이트 크리스마스) is a 2011 South Korean television series starring Kim Sang-kyung, Baek Sung-hyun, and a cast of then-rookie actors, namely Kim Young-kwang, Lee Soo-hyuk, Kwak Jung-wook, Hong Jong-hyun, Esom, Kim Woo-bin, Sung Joon, Jung Suk-won, and Lee El. Written by Park Yeon-seon and directed by Kim Yong-soo, it aired as part of the Drama Special Series on KBS2 from January 30 to March 20, 2011 on Sundays at 23:15 for 8 episodes.

A series of deaths, including murder and suicide, take place over eight days in a private, elite high school deep in the mountains, with the students cut off from the outside world and in highly volatile and unstable emotional conditions. The drama deals with the question of whether evil is organic or environmental, and the potential for adolescents to be extremely empathetic as well as equally cruel.

== Plot ==
Deep in the mountains of Gangwon, the private, elite Soo-sin High School is attended by the top 1% of students in the country. Their stellar marks are the result of constant pressure and a strict punishment system, to the point where students avoid any activities outside of studying. It is in this atmosphere that seven students and a teacher remain at school for the winter break, joined by Kim Yo-han (Kim Sang-kyung), a psychiatrist who was forced to take shelter with them after he was injured in a car accident nearby. Stranded from heavy snow, they spend eight days together ― from Christmas Eve to New Year's Day.

Park Mu-yeol (Baek Sung-hyun) is an honor student who chooses to remain in school during the winter break after receiving an abusive letter. Jo Young-jae (Kim Young-kwang) is a detested bully who attacks other people to hide his inferiority complex. Yoon Soo (Lee Soo-hyuk) is a disturbed, but rich student fronting a rock band. Yoo Eun-sung (Esom) was once a popular girl in school before having a sudden change of personality.

At a time when everyone else is celebrating the holidays, the students realize that the anonymous letters they each received were not the result of a harmless prank; there is a murderer in their midst. A question lies unspoken: Are monsters created, or are humans born monsters?

== Cast ==
- Kim Sang-kyung as Kim Yo-han, a psychologist who takes refuge in the school after being stranded in a car accident.
- Baek Sung-hyun as Park Mu-yeol, an honor student who is driven by morals and justice.
- Kim Young-kwang as Jo Young-jae, a bully who attacks other people to hide his inferiority complex.
- Lee Soo-hyuk as Yoon Soo, a mysterious and eccentric rich boy with a love of music.
- Kwak Jung-wook as Yang Kang-mo, a snarky deaf boy who takes an interest in photography and filmmaking.
- Hong Jong-hyun as Lee Jae-kyu, a quiet and polite boy who transferred to the school within the past year.
- Esom as Yoo Eun-sung, a girl who used to be bright and friendly, but has since become withdrawn and cynical.
- Kim Woo-bin^{1} as Kang Mi-reu, a rowdy and infamous troublemaker.
- Sung Joon as Choi Chi-hoon, a stoic boy with the highest grades in the school, who is regarded as a genius prodigy by those around him.
- Jung Suk-won as Yoon Jong-il, the school's PE teacher.
- Lee El as Oh Jung-hye, a free-spirited woman with good survival skills.

== See also ==
- List of Christmas films

== Notes ==
- ^{1}Kim Woo-bin Credited as Kim Hyun-joong.
