= Horror Stories 2 =

- Film poster
- Hangul: 무서운 이야기 2
- RR: Museoun iyagi 2
- MR: Musŏun iyagi 2
- Directed by: Min Kyu-dong; Kim Sung-ho; Kim Hwi; Jung Bum-sik
- Written by: Min Kyu-dong; Kim Sung-ho; Kim Hwi; Jung Bum-sik
- Produced by: Min Jin-su; Kim Won-guk; Yoo Jae-hyeon
- Starring: Lee Se-young; Park Sung-woong; Sung Joon; Lee Soo-hyuk; Baek Jin-hee; Kim Seul-gi; Jung In-sun; Go Kyung-pyo; Kim Ji-won; Gil Eun-hye
- Cinematography: Kim Hyeong-ju; Lee Jae-hyeok; Kim Young-min; Jung Seong-wook
- Edited by: Son Yeon-ji; Eom Yun-ju; Shin Min-kyung; Kim Hyeong-ju
- Music by: Jeong Yong-jin; Yeon Ri-mok; Na Yun-sik; Lee Jin-hui
- Production companies: Daisy-Cinergy Entertainment; Soo Film
- Distributed by: Lotte Entertainment
- Release date: June 5, 2013
- Running time: 95 minutes
- Country: South Korea
- Language: Korean

Horror Stories 2 (Korean: 무서운 이야기 2) is a 2013 horror omnibus film made up of four episodes by four South Korean directors. It screened at the Puchon International Fantastic Film Festival and Sitges Film Festival in 2013, and won the Silver Raven prize in the International Competition at the 2014 Brussels International Fantastic Film Festival.

Min Kyu-dong's 444 is set against the backdrop of the warehouse of an insurance company where a woman with the ability to communicate with the dead delves into fraudulent insurance claim cases. Kim Sung-ho's The Cliff focuses on two friends who go hiking in the woods then get trapped at the edge of a cliff. Kim Hwi's The Accident centers on three depressed girls who go on a road trip after they fail the teacher's certification exam, but a car crash turns their trip into a nightmare. Jung Bum-shik's The Escape is about a male trainee teacher who gets locked in the doorway to hell.

It is a sequel of horror and scary tale trilogy Horror Stories, a film with a similar format which was released in 2012.

== Stories ==
=== 444 ===
- Plot: Se-young, an outsider at an insurance company, has the extraordinary ability to communicate with dead people. Manager Park, Se-young's boss, assuming that she has some kind of special power, decides to test it. One very late night when everyone has gone home, Mr. Park brings Se-young to a storage room full of case reports. Among them, Mr. Park picks three doubtful cases. He asks Se-young to tell him exactly what happened. Se-young, who senses some dark aura around him, tells the story of each case. Every time Se-young finishes each case, the dark aura gets darker and bigger and Se-young tries to warn Mr. Park about it.
- Directed by Min Kyu-dong
- Lee Se-young as Se-young
- Park Sung-woong as Manager Park

=== The Cliff ===
- The Cliff (절벽; Jeolbyeok) (Running time: 23 minutes)
- Plot: Two friends luckily survive after falling from a cliff, but end up on a protruding rock just below. While waiting to be rescued, their friendship soon breaks apart because of one chocolate candy bar. To survive, one of them has to die. (Adapted from Oh Seong-dae's popular webtoon The Cliff.)
- Directed by Kim Sung-ho
- Sung Joon as Cho Dong-wook
- Lee Soo-hyuk as Park Sung-kyun
- Noh Kang-min as young boy in apartment playground

=== The Accident ===
- The Accident (사고; Sago) (Running time: 23 minutes)
- Plot: Three young women fail their teacher certification examination. To cheer themselves up, the friends set out on a road trip into the mountains. But they get into a crash and their car breaks down. Despite their injuries, they decide to walk toward a dim light coming from a mountain.
- Directed by Kim Hwi
- Baek Jin-hee as Kang Ji-eun
- Kim Seul-gi as Yoon Mi-ra
- Jung In-sun as Gil Sun-joo
- Kim Gi-cheon as resident of mountain cabin
- Shin Wu-Cheol as doctor

=== The Escape ===
- The Escape (탈출; Talchul) (Running time: 30 minutes)
- Plot: Byeong-shin is a trainee teacher who gets humiliated by his students on his first day at school. After meeting Tan-hee, a high school girl obsessed with black magic, he imitates one of her spells. He finds himself locked in the doorway to hell.
- Directed by Jung Bum-sik
- Go Kyung-pyo as Go Byeong-shin
- Kim Ji-won as Sa Tan-hee
- Im Won-hee as teacher
- Kim Ye-won as Byeong-shin's girlfriend
- Gil Eun-hye as Tan-hee's older sister
- Ryu Hye-young as Tan-hee's friend
