= Dangerously Excited =

- Hangul: 나는 공무원이다
- Hanja: 나는 公務員이다
- RR: Naneun gongmuwonida
- MR: Nanŭn kongmuwŏnida
- Directed by: Koo Ja-hong
- Written by: Koo Ja-hong
- Produced by: Jung Hye-young; Mapofilm
- Starring: Yoon Je-moon; Sung Joon
- Cinematography: Oh Jae-ho
- Edited by: Kim Woo-il
- Music by: Jang Young-yu; Dalpalan
- Distributed by: Next Entertainment World
- Release date: July 12, 2012
- Running time: 101 minutes
- Country: South Korea
- Language: Korean
- Budget: ₩200 million
- Box office: US$1.3 million

Dangerously Excited (Korean: 나는 공무원이다; lit. 'I'm a Civil Servant') is a 2012 South Korean comedy-drama film starring Yoon Je-moon as a stuffy municipal bureaucrat who learns to embrace life when a budding rock band moves into his basement. The film premiered at the 2011 Busan International Film Festival and also screened at the 2012 Udine Far East Film Festival.

== Plot ==
Han Dae-hee (Yoon Je-moon) is a low level city government employee in the Mapo District of Seoul. His department handles various issues like trash, noise, and public safety. Dae-hee isn't married, nor does he have a girlfriend at the moment. He also doesn't have many hobbies. Dae-hee enjoys memorizing facts from books to impress his colleagues and watching television until falling asleep. You can say he is conservative and his job at the city government office suits him well.

Within the Mapo district lies the Hongdae area famous for the thriving indie rock music scene. Dae-hee leaves with a co-worker to talk with a band who has received numerous complaints from neighbors about loud noise in a residential neighborhood.

The band is practicing for their next album which is coming out in the upcoming days. They are disheartened when Dae-hee and his co-worker informs them they have to stop playing in their rented basement. During their talk, a man comes by and offers the band to rent his attic room for a generous price. Dae-hee and his co-worker knows something is fishy, but just go about their business.

The next day, the band discovers their musical instruments and rent money stolen by the con man who offered to rent his apartment. Meanwhile, they become angry at civil worker Dae-hee who introduced them to the con man. They go visit Dae-hee at his office.

To avoid a scene in front of his boss, Dae-hee quickly offers the band his basement for their practice sessions. Dae-hee seems to have little interest in music or the kids. Yet, days later when 2 members quit the band, Dae-hee is recruited to join the band as their bassist...

== Cast ==
- Yoon Je-moon - Han Dae-hee
- Sung Joon - Min-ki
- Kim Byul - Mi-sun
- Kim Hee-jung - Saku
- Seo Hyun-jung - Young-jin
- Kwon Soo-hyun - Soo
- Yoo Seung-mok - Lee Je-soon
- Oh Kwang-rok - Bob Dylan (cameo)
- Go Chang-seok - music judge (cameo)
- Park Hae-il - Dae-hee's brother (cameo)

== Critical reception ==
The Korea Times calls the film "superb. Unlike the entertaining but ultimately forgettable slapstick comedies studios churn out year after year, the movie beautifully blends fun with serious existential problems. The nearly flawless screenplay is further lifted by seasoned actor Yoon Je-moon's magnificent performance. His portrayal of Dae-hee is what makes this film work. Not in a single scene does his acting seem forced. His impenetrable face keeps viewers guessing. Behind it, his emotions can appear so simple, yet a perplexing psychological change is taking place. It is simply a pleasure watching this brilliance on screen."

Koreanfilm.org finds it "wry, funny" and "one of those unexpected pleasures: a film that is able to take a very ordinary situation, and turn it into something vivid, memorable and thoroughly entertaining." Recognizable to many fans of Korean cinema for his supporting roles, Yoon Je-moon as the protagonist is described as "one of the most memorable screen performances of 2012." Koreanfilm.org adds that "one hopes that the film's modest budget and lack of star power won't prevent it from reaching the widest possible audience."

Twitch Film also praised Yoon's performance, which "never veers into caricature. Instead, his slight mannerisms and idiosyncrasies add expressive layers to a standard fish-out-of-water character." Despite a few misgivings, the reviewer found the film "pleasant viewing" and that director Koo Ja-hong has "potential as a strong storyteller."

The Hollywood Reporter was not so positive, finding "little else going on here to make the film as cutting edge as it wants to be."
