= Lee Hyun-jae (actor) =

South Korean actor and drummer

- 이현재
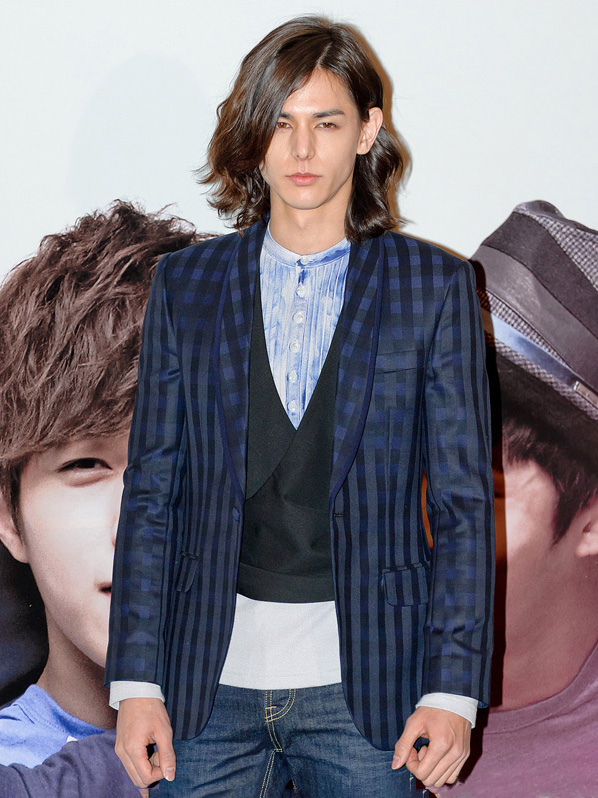
- Lee at the press conference of Flower Band, January 2012
- Born: April 12, 1988 (age 38); Icheon, South Korea
- Education: Paekche Institute of the Arts
- Occupation: Actor
- Years active: 2009–present
- Agent: RaemongRaein
- Spouse: Kim Yeol (2016–present)

Lee Hyun-jae (Korean: 이현재; born April 12, 1988) is a South Korean actor and drummer. He made his acting debut in South Korean television drama High Kick Through the Roof (2009). He featured in the commercially successful Chinese films, Tiny Times 3 (2014) and Tiny Times 4 (2015), and helped him achieve general recognition in China.

== Filmography ==
=== Television dramas ===
- High Kick Through the Roof (2009)
- Color of Woman (2011)
- Flower Band (2012)
- Ad Genius Lee Tae-baek (2013)
- The Queen of Office (2013)
- Reckless Family (2013–2014)
- Song of Phoenix (2016)
- Please Find Her (2017)

=== Feature films ===
- Play (2011)
- Tiny Times 3 (2014)
- Tiny Times 4 (2015)
- Cities in Love (2015)
- The Old Cinderella 2 (2015)
- Movie Master of Pretending (2016)
