= Oh Seong-dae =

South Korean webtoon artist

- Born: November 18, 1982 (age 44) Seoul, South Korea
- Area: Webtoon artist
- Pseudonym: Seongdae Oh
- Notable works: Tales of the Unusual (2013–2022); The Cliff; My Wife's Memories; Beauty Water; Expiring City

- Oh Seong-dae
- Hangul: 오성대
- Hanja: 吳城垈
- RR: O Seongdae
- MR: O Sŏngdae

Oh Seong-dae (Korean: 오성대; Hanja: 吳城垈; born November 18, 1982) is a South Korean webtoon artist. He is best known for his popular horror thriller anthology webtoon series Tales of the Unusual, which has gained widespread acclaim both Korean and global readers.

== Life and career ==
Oh Seong-dae was born on November 18, 1982, in Seoul, South Korea. He developed a love of drawing when he was in elementary school. He graduated from Seoul National University of Science and Technology. Seong-dae studied various subjects related to art and design. He began his career as a designer but quit soon after. Later, he took part in a comic competition organized by Naver, which gave him a chance to debut in the field of webtoon.

The webtoon platform Naver WEBTOON had three interesting series released between 2009 and 2012. The first one, called Author J, ran from October 2009 to November 2010 and tells the story of a deceased writer whose consciousness has been transferred into a computer AI. Bonbon au Chocolat, released from April 2011 to August 2012, is a funny love story between two middle school students. Finally, from July to August 2012, The Cliff was released, which follows two men who go on a hiking trip and end up stranded on the edge of a cliff. As they wait for help, tensions rise and their sanity begins to unravel.

On May 8, 2013, Seong-dae created an anthology webtoon called Tales of the Unusual and published it on Naver WEBTOON. Unlike Seong-dae's previous webtoons, Tales of the Unusual is a horror and thriller genre, containing elements of supernatural, psychological suspense, mystery, satire, black comedy, drama, science fiction, and dark-modern fantasy. For its artwork and aesthetic, Seong-dae chose to use monochromatic black and white, grayscale, and darker colors, rather than mild primary colors.

Seong-dae characterized Tales of the Unusual as "strange", "unusual", "thrilling", and "mysterious", frequently with a darker tone than its previous webtoons. It comprises self-contained, standalone short stories that follow characters (or recurring characters from previous webtoons) as they experience strange and unusual events. Each story's plot elements detail various topics such as real-life events, social issues, viral phenomena, urban legends, and paranormal events. They often involve bizarre and supernatural occurrences with an unexpected twist.

Tales of the Unusual drew inspiration from a variety of sources. Among them were the works of acclaimed horror authors, including Junji Ito, Stephen King, Neil Gaiman, R.L. Stine, Franz Kafka, and Haruki Murakami. Seong-dae was also influenced by TV anthology series, such as The Twilight Zone, Goosebumps, The X-Files, and Black Mirror. When it comes to films, Seong-dae drew inspiration from the works of film directors, including Jason Blum, M. Night Shyamalan, Darren Aronofsky, Stanley Kubrick, David Lynch, and Alfred Hitchcock, as well as korean horror films.

In June 2013, an anthology film Horror Stories 2 was released on June 5, 2013. One of the stories is adapted from The Cliff.

From July to August 2014, The Cliff received English and Chinese translations by WEBTOON. Tales of the Unusual received an official English translation by WEBTOON on July 1, 2014. The webtoon gained immense popularity among readers in Korea and globally, and it has become the most popular webtoon on the WEBTOON platform.

From November to December 2013, My Wife's Memories was released on Naver WEBTOON. The story follows a middle-aged man who is haunted by ghostly visions of his late dementia-ridden wife to relive her memories before she passes away in a tragic accident. In August 2014, Sina Weibo user Yaoyaoxiaojing (妖妖小精) translated My Wife's Memories into Chinese and posted it on her Weibo. 550,000 people shared the comic just two days after she had posted it, making it an instant hit among the Chinese community, and bringing Seong-dae much fame.

On October 11, 2014, Tales of the Unusual received an official Chinese translation by WEBTOON and Dongman Manhua. On November 18, 2014, Tales of the Unusual also received an official Thai translation by WEBTOON. On April 20, 2015, Tales of the Unusual also received an official Indonesian translation by WEBTOON.

From February 10 to 15, 2015, Seong-dae attended the Taipei International Comics and Animation Festival along with fellow webtoon artist massstar. Both of them hosted autograph sessions for their fans in the booth of WEBTOON.

Between February and April 2015, a webcomic named Beauty Water was published on Naver WEBTOON. The story follows a young woman who uses a cosmetic liquid product to achieve her desired appearance, akin to plastic surgery. However, as she becomes increasingly addicted to the product, she discovers disturbing side effects that begin to affect her. In June 2015, Sina Weibo user Hanmansimida (韩漫思密达) translated Beauty Water into Chinese and posted it on her Weibo. As the story touched on contemporary social issues, it was quickly viewed by over 1,000,000 people, making it an instant hit among the Chinese community and raising Seong-dae's profile in China once more. After knowing this, Seong-dae thanked the Chinese readers on Facebook in Chinese.

From October 1 to 5, 2015, Seong-dae attended and gave autographs to his fans with fellow webtoon artists Jo Seok, Son Jae-ho, and Lee Kwang-soo at the China International Comic Festival EXPO. On October 19, 2015, WEBTOON released a promotional animated trailer for Tales of the Unusual, produced by an animation studio, Delpic Design Studio.

On December 18, 2015, Seong-dae won a "Webtoonist of the Year" for his webtoon, Tales of the Unusual on WEBTOON's Webtoonist Day. From June 9 to 10, 2016, Seong-dae also attended and gave autographs to his fans in the booth of WEBTOON at Beijing Comic-Con along with fellow webtoon artist Jo Seok.

In 2017, the original Japanese television series Yo nimo Kimyō na Monogatari was released. One of the episodes is adapted from My Wife's Memories

In 2018, a print version of Tales of the Unusual was released on June 15, 2018, by Sodam Books. On February 21, 2019, an original net animation based on Tales of the Unusual was released on the Naver WEBTOON YouTube Channel. Each 20 episodes is adapted from 13 short stories, including The Dream-sharing Stone, The Hole, The Chatroom, The Teleporter, A Mysterious Package, The Pet Wig, Jayce's Pen, The Ghost Polaroids, Hair, 14K, Scene Box, Insomnia, and The Mole Stitcher.

On September 18, 2019, Seong-Dae announced that Tales of the Unusual would take a break after the first season ended. After an eight-month hiatus, the series resumed for a second season on May 20, 2020. On October 25, 2020, an English version of Tales of the Unusual also resumed after an 11-month break. The series concluded on June 1, 2022, after running for nine years.

In 2020, a South Korean animation studio, Studio Animal, produced an animated film adaptation of Beauty Water. After debuting at several international film festivals, it was released on September 9, 2020, in Taiwan, Singapore, Hong Kong, Australia, and New Zealand. Despite being popular among Chinese readers, the film was never released in China due to souring Korean relations after the deployment of the THAAD missile defense system, as no Chinese investors would support it.

On November 3, 2020, Seong-dae won "Today's Our Manhwa Award" for his webtoon, Tales of the Unusual from the Ministry of Culture, Sports and Tourism.

On March 9, 2024, Naver WEBTOON released Tales of the Unusual 2, a sequel to Seong-dae's original work, which received an official Indonesian translation on June 6, 2024, and an English translation on October 24, 2024, by WEBTOON.

== Works ==
=== Tales of the Unusual Series ===
Tales of the Unusual (2013–2022)
- Season 1 (May 8, 2013–September 18, 2019):
  - Prologue, May 8, 2013
  - The Gallery of the Damned (저주받은 갤러리, May 15–July 17, 2013, 10 episodes)
  - An African Incident (아프리카에서 생긴 일, July 24–August 28, 2013, 6 episodes)
  - To Kill a Magician (마술사 죽이기, September 4–October 9, 2013, 6 episodes)
  - The Reset Elevator (리셋 엘리베이터, October 23–November 13, 2013, 4 episodes)
  - My Wife's Memories (아내의 기억, November 20–December 25, 2013, 6 episodes)
  - Camping (캠핑, January 8–15, 2014, 2 episodes)
  - A Mysterious Package (상자 키우기, January 22–February 12, 2014, 4 episodes)
  - The Mysterious Potter (곰보할배 도자기, February 19–March 12, 2014, 4 episodes)
  - Winning Numbers (당첨번호, March 26–April 30, 2014, 6 episodes)
  - Ghost Hunting (귀신잡기, May 21–June 16, 2014, 5 episodes)
  - The Painting (여인화, October 15–22, 2014, 2 episodes)
  - Evolving Reincarnation (진화환생법, October 29–December 17, 2014, 8 episodes)
  - The Chat Room (채팅만남, December 31, 2014)
  - Murderous Rage (살의, January 7–21, 2015, 3 episodes)
  - Lex Talionis (Lex Talionis, January 28, 2015)
  - Beauty Water (성형수, February 4–April 22, 2015, 11 episodes)
  - Growth Water (괴모수, May 6, 2015)
  - The Man and the Dog (남자와 개, May 13–July 1, 2015, 8 episodes)
  - The Dream-sharing Stone (꿈공유석, July 8–29 2015, 4 episodes)
  - Regeneration Seed (재생종자, August 12–26 2015, 3 episodes)
  - The Ghost App (심령어플, September 2, 2015)
  - The Ghost Polaroids (고스트 폴라로이드, September 9–16, 2015, 2 episodes)
  - Jayce's Pen (제이스의 펜, September 23–October 21, 2015, 4 episodes)
  - Insomnia (불면증, October 29, 2015)
  - The Break-In (도난, November 4–11, 2015, 2 episodes)
  - Lucidity Controller (루시드컨, November 25–December 23, 2015, 5 episodes)
  - Earth Warrior Taletron (지구용사 기괴트론, December 30, 2015–January 20, 2016, 4 episodes)
  - Bone Dice (본 다이스, January 27–February 17, 2016, 4 episodes)
  - Kiveiru's Library (키베이루의 서재, May 14–June 22, 2016, 8 episodes)
  - Real Implant (Real Implant, June 29, 2016)
  - Revenge (복수, July 6, 2016)
  - Drawings (그림, July 14–20, 2016, 2 episodes)
  - Lurker (Lurker, August 3–24, 2016, 4 episodes)
  - The Pet Wig (애완가발, August 31–September 7, 2016, 3 episodes)
  - The Future Spirit (미래사령, September 21–November 23, 2016, 10 episodes)
  - The Teleporter (순간이동기, November 30–December 21, 2016, 4 episodes)
  - Demonic Bloodweed (마혈초, December 28, 2016–January 11, 2017, 3 episodes)
  - Mini-Me (미니미, January 18–25, 2017, 2 episodes)
  - Ghost Home Care (고스트 홈케어, February 1–8, 2017, 2 episodes)
  - The Package (택배, February 15–22, 2017, 2 episodes)
  - Eternal Life Pills (영생환, March 1–May 10, 2017, 11 episodes)
  - A Special Meal (특식, May 17–24, 2017, 2 episodes)
  - Soul Trapping (봉혼, May 31–June 21, 2017, 4 episodes)
  - The Hole (Hole, June 28–July 5, 2017, 2 episodes)
  - Ghost Design (고스트 인테리어, July 12–19, 2017 2 episodes)
  - Gold Motel (골드모텔, July 26–August 16, 2017, 4 episodes)
  - 14K (14K, August 30–October 4, 2017, 6 episodes)
  - The Bug (벌레, October 11–18, 2017, 2 episodes)
  - The Mole Stitcher (점잇귀, October 25–December 6, 2017, 7 episodes)
  - Scene Box (Scene Box, December 13, 2017–January 3, 2018, 4 episodes)
  - Hair (머리카락, January 10–24, 2018, 3 episodes)
  - More Days (More Days, January 31–February 14, 2018, 3 episodes)
  - The Carbonated Virus (탄산바이러스, February 21–28, 2018, 2 episodes)
  - Confinement (감금, March 7–21, 2018, 3 episodes)
  - The Tournament (대회, June 6–13, 2018, 2 episodes)
  - The Unusual Hospital (기괴병원, June 20–27, 2018, 2 episodes)
  - Growth Mountains (성장산, July 4–18, 2018, 3 episodes)
  - The Human Door (인간현관, July 25–September 5, 2018, 7 episodes)
  - Friends (친구, September 12–19, 2018, 2 episodes)
  - Watermelon (수박, October 3–10, 2018, 2 episodes)
  - Brain Contamination (뇌오염, October 17–November 7, 2018, 4 episodes)
  - Change (Change, November 14–21, 2018, 2 episodes)
  - A Boy and a Murderer (소년과 살인마, November 28, 2018–January 9, 2019, 7 episodes)
  - Acc Plants (Acc Plants, January 23–February 27, 2019, 6 episodes)
  - The Stationery Store (문방구, March 6–13, 2019, 2 episodes)
  - Magnet (Magnet, March 20–April 24, 2019, 5 episodes)
  - Makeover (성형귀, May 1–22, 2019, 4 episodes)
  - Cafe (카페, June 5–12, 2019, 2 episodes)
  - Head (Head, June 19–July 17, 2019, 5 episodes)
  - VR (VR, July 24–31, 2019, 2 episodes)
  - Karaoke and an Odeng Truck (노래방과 오뎅트럭, August 7–14, 2019, 2 episodes)
  - Thief (도둑, August 21–September 11, 2019, 4 episodes)
  - Season 1 Finale, September 18, 2019
- Season 2 (May 20, 2020–June 1, 2022):
  - New Beauty Water (뉴성형수, May 20–August 5, 2020, 12 episodes)
  - Game (GAME, August 12–September 2, 2020, 4 episodes)
  - Black Fog (검은 안개, September 9–23, 2020, 3 episodes)
  - The Gym of the Damned (저주받은 체육관, September 30–October 21, 2020, 4 episodes)
  - Grim Reaper (저승사자, October 28–November 18, 2020, 4 episodes)
  - Living Doll (생인형, November 24–December 16, 2020, 4 episodes)
  - Brain (뇌, December 23–30, 2020, 2 episodes)
  - A Webtoonist's Dream (웹툰작가의 꿈, January 6–20, 2021, 3 episodes)
  - Hypnosis (최면, January 27–February 17, 2021, 4 episodes)
  - Queen of Anesthesia (마취여왕, February 24–March 24, 2021, 5 episodes)
  - Fever (열, April 7–14, 2021, 2 episodes)
  - The Demon Man (마귀인간, April 21–May 12, 2021, 4 episodes)
  - Expiring City (소멸의 도시, May 19–July 21, 2021, 9 episodes)
  - Devil's Eyes (악마의 눈, July 28–August 19, 2021, 4 episodes)
  - Oil Bug Diet (기름충 다이어트, September 1–15, 2021, 3 episodes)
  - In a Rut (틀, September 22–October 6, 2021, 3 episodes)
  - Switch (스위치, October 13–27, 2021, 3 episodes)
  - Paper Prison (종이 감옥, November 3, 2021–December 22, 2021, 8 episodes)
  - Dating a Ghost (귀신과 연애를, January 5–19, 2022, 3 episodes)
  - Random Injection (랜덤 주사, January 26–February 2, 2022, 2 episodes)
  - Shell (껍데기, February 9–March 9, 2022, 5 episodes)
  - Winter Tree (겨울나무, March 16–May 25, 2022, 11 episodes)
  - Epilogue, June 1, 2022

Tales of the Unusual 2 (2024–Ongoing)
- Road Kill (로드킬)
- Friends, Even in Death (죽어도 내 친구)
- Self-Destruction App of the Evil Spirit (악령의 자폭앱)
- Ghosts of the Cliff (절벽귀들)
- Those Who Tear Things Away (뜯어가는 자들)
- The Demonic Sculptor (마성의 조형사)
- Frozen Hotel (냉동호텔)
- Masterpiecebot (만신봇)
- The Demonic Doll (마성의 인형)
- Beauty Water: Aphrodite from Hell (성형수: 지옥의 아프로디테)
- Plantfolk (식물인간)
- The Demon at the Tip of the Brush (붓 끝의 악령)
- Deadly Siblings (치명적 남매)
- Janus (야누스)
- The Eruris Project (에루리스 프로젝트)
- Cafe-In (Cafe-In)
- The Dry Children (건조한 아이들)
- Deadly Siblings Part 2 (치명적 남매 2부)
- Worn Hands (낡은 손)
- Pharmacy (약국)

=== Series and One-shots ===
- Author J (소설가J, October 2009–November 2010, 48 episodes)
- Bonbon au Chocolat (봉봉오쇼콜라, April 2011–August 2012, 69 episodes)
- The Cliff (절벽귀, July–August 2012, 9 episodes)
- Bunker Man (벙커맨, September 2012)
- Tales of the Unusual (기기괴괴, May 2013–June 2022, 94 stories)
- The Ghost in the Celling (공포의 만화책, June 2013)
- S.O.S (S.O.S, July 2015)
- Shadow Makeover (그림자 성형, August 2019)
- Tales of the Unusual 2 (기기괴괴 2, March 2024–Present)

== Adaptations ==
Year	Title	Notes
2013	Horror Stories 2	Adapted in the first episode based on The Cliff
2017	Yo nimo Kimyō na Monogatari	Adapts short story based on My Wife's Memories in an episode
2019	Tales of the Unusual	Original net animation adaptation
2020	Beauty Water	Animated film adaptation
