= Kim In-seo =

South Korean actress

- Born: January 11, 1984 (age 42); Jeju Province, South Korea
- Other name: Kim Si-Woon
- Occupation: Actress
- Spouse: Unknown (m. 2014)
- Children: 2

Korean name
- Hangul: 김인서
- RR: Gim Inseo
- MR: Kim Insŏ

Kim In-seo (Korean: 김인서; born 11 January 1984) is a South Korean actress, best known for her portrayal of Se-jung in the 2010 action thriller film I Saw the Devil.

== Works ==
She is best known for her portrayal of Se-jung in the action film I Saw the Devil, which was censored thrice to get an adult rating in South Korea. In the international cut of the film, her sex scene with Choi Min-sik, which exposed her naked butt was cut, while at the same time being retained in the Korean cut.

She has also appeared in other Korean films like Children, Goodbye Mom and drama series like Flower Band, Vampire Prosecutor, Please Come Back, Soon-ae and The Musical.

== Personal life ==
Kim took a break from acting and married her non-celebrity boyfriend in September 2014. She gave birth to their two daughters, before returning to acting in 2020.

== Filmography ==
=== Television ===
- Reply 1994 (tvN, 2013) cameo
- Vampire Prosecutor 2 (OCN, 2012)
- Flower Band (tvN, 2012)
- Strangers 6 (WOWOW, 2012)
- The Musical (SBS, 2011)
- Killer K (CGV, 2011)
- War of the Roses (SBS, 2011)
- Bad Couple (SBS, 2007)
- Company Love (OCN, 2007)
- Drama City: "GOD" (KBS2, 2007)
- Please Come Back, Soon-ae (SBS, 2006)

=== Film ===
- Children (2011)
- I Saw the Devil (2010)
- Goodbye Mom (2009)
- A Boy Who is Walking in the Sky (2008)
