= Yoon Je-moon =

South Korean actor

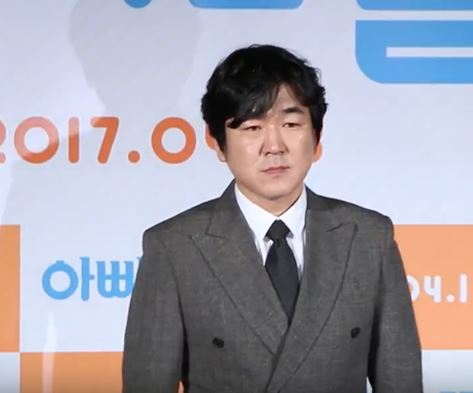
- Yoon in 2017
- Born: March 9, 1970 (age 56); Hapjeong-dong, Mapo-gu, Seoul, South Korea
- Other name: Yoon Jae-mun
- Occupation: Actor
- Agent: SM Culture & Contents

Korean name
- Hangul: 윤제문
- RR: Yun Jemun
- MR: Yun Chemun

Yoon Je-moon (born March 9, 1970) is a South Korean actor. He appears in theater, film and television, notably in the movies The Man Next Door (2010) and Dangerously Excited (2012), and the TV series The End of the World (2013).

== Filmography ==
=== Film ===
- Ung-nam-i (TBA) (documentary film)
- Heaven: To the Land of Happiness (TBA)
- Choir of God (2025)
- Excellence (2022)
- Fukuoka (2020)
- Beasts Clawing at Straws (2020) (cameo)
- Tazza: One Eyed Jack (2019)
- Forbidden Dream (2019)
- The Drug King (2018)
- Ode to the Goose (2018)
- High Society (2018)
- My Wife (2017)
- Okja (2017)
- Daddy You, Daughter Me (2017)
- One Day (cameo) (2017)
- Asura: The City of Madness (special appearance) (2016)
- The Last Princess (2016)
- "Missing You" (2016)
- The Great Actor (2015)
- The Wait (2015)
- Three Summer Nights (2015)
- My Dictator (2014)
- Haemoo (2014)
- Commitment (2013)
- Boomerang Family (2013)
- Fists of Legend (2013)
- Dangerously Excited (2012)
- Doomsday Book (2012)
- Quick (2011)
- Battlefield Heroes (2011)
- Lovers Vanished (2010)
- The Man Next Door (2010)
- Chaw (2009)
- Mother (2009) as Je-moon
- Private Eye (2009)
- Boy Director (2008)
- The Good, the Bad, the Weird (2008)
- Life is Beautiful (2008)
- Love Exposure (2007)
- The Show Must Go On (2007)
- Voice of a Murderer (2007)
- Goodbye Children (short film, 2006))
- Cruel Winter Blues (2006)
- The Host (2006)
- A Dirty Carnival (2006)
- The Romance (2006)
- You Are My Sunshine (2005)
- Antarctic Journal (2005)
- Ghost House (2004)
- Influenza (Jeonju Digital Project 2004)
- Sink & Rise (short film in Twentidentity, 2003)
- Mobile (short film in Show Me, 2003)
- Jungle Juice (2002)
- Super Glue (short film, 2001)
- Golden Laughter (short film, 2000)

=== Television series ===
- Red Swan (2024)
- Nothing Uncovered (2024)
- Reborn Rich (2022)
- The King's Affection (2021)
- Last (2015)
- Three Days (2014)
- The End of the World (2013)
- The King 2 Hearts (2012)
- Tree With Deep Roots (2011)
- Midas (2011)
- Iris (2009)
- General Hospital 2 (2008)
- Reverse (2026)

== Theater ==
2013

- Ode to Youth

2010

- Art
- The Pitmen Painters

2008

- Ode to Youth

2007

- At Baekmudong
- The Pillowman

2004–2005

- Ode to Youth

2001

- 쥐

1999

- Ode to Youth

(Undated)

- Battle of Black and Dogs
- 삽 아니면 도끼
- Generation After Generation
- 물속에서 숨쉬는 자 하나도 없다
- Woman of the Year
- The Three Musketeers
- Gaettong from Beyond the Mountains
- Ogu
- The Island
- Six Characters in Search of an Author
- Hamlet
- Kiss
- Man Holding Flowers
- 살려주세요
- 타이거 외 다수
- 禪

== Awards ==
- 2011 SBS Drama Awards: Special Acting Award, Actor in a Special Planning Drama (Midas)
- 2010 Busan Film Critics Awards: Best Actor (The Man Next Door)
- 2000 Dong-A Theatre Awards: Best Actor (Ode to Youth)
