= Can We Get Married? =

South Korean television series

- Promotional poster
- Also known as: Can We Marry?
- Hangul: 우리가 결혼할 수 있을까
- Hanja: 우리가 結婚할 수 있을까
- RR: Uriga gyeolhonhal su isseulkka
- MR: Uriga kyŏrhonhal su issŭlkka
- Genre: Romance; Comedy; Family
- Written by: Ha Myung-hee
- Directed by: Kim Yoon-cheol
- Starring: Sung Joon; Jung So-min; Lee Mi-sook
- Composer: Kim Sang-heon
- Country of origin: South Korea
- Original language: Korean
- No. of episodes: 20

Production
- Producer: Kim Ji-il
- Production location: Korea
- Cinematography: Kim Gyeong-cheol
- Editor: Lee Hyeon-mi
- Production company: Drama House

Original release
- Network: JTBC
- Release: October 29, 2012 – January 1, 2013

Can We Get Married? (Korean: 우리가 결혼할 수 있을까; RR: Uriga gyeolhonhal su isseulkka) is a 2012 South Korean television series starring Sung Joon, Jung So-min, Lee Mi-sook, Han Groo, and Kim Young-kwang. It aired on JTBC from October 29, 2012, to January 1, 2013, on Mondays and Tuesdays at 23:00 (KST) for 20 episodes. The romantic comedy realistically explores the themes of love, marriage and family against the backdrop of a young couple preparing to get married in 100 days.

== Synopsis ==
The drama revolves around 3 couples, who experience different things in their relationships.

== Cast ==
- Sung Joon as Jung-hoon (28)
- Jung So-min as Hye-yoon (28)
- Kim Sung-min as Do-hyun (42)
- Jung Ae-yeon as Hye-jin (30)
- Lee Mi-sook as Deul-ja (52)
- Sunwoo Eun-sook as Eun-kyung (50)
- Kang Seok-woo as Dong-gun (50)
- Kim Young-kwang as Ki-joong (32)
- Han Groo as Dong-bi (28)
- Kim Jin-soo as Min-ho (43)
- Choi Hwa-jung as Deul-rae (50)
- Lee Jae-won as Sang-jin (32)
- Jin Ye-sol as Chae-young (25)
- Choi Ji-hun as Yoo-ri (23)
- Hwang Jae-won as Nam Tae-won (7)
- Kim Ji-sook as Ki-joong's mother
- Seo Ji-yeon as Director Kim
- Lee Jae-yong as Dong-bi's father

== Awards and nominations ==
2013 49th Baeksang Arts Awards

- Nomination - Best Screenplay (TV) - Ha Myung-hee

== International broadcast ==
- Japan: TBS - 2013.
- Thailand: PPTV - 2014.
- Vietnam: VTV3 – March 8, 2014.
- Chile: Via X Channel - 2015.
