= One Day (2017 film) =

- Theatrical release poster
- Hangul: 어느날
- RR: Eoneunal
- MR: Ŏnŭnal
- Directed by: Lee Yoon-ki
- Written by: Kim Sun-ah
- Produced by: Lee Dong-ho; Kim Dong-hyun
- Starring: Kim Nam-gil; Chun Woo-hee
- Cinematography: Choi Sang-ho
- Edited by: Kim Hyung-joo
- Music by: Kim Jeong-beom
- Production companies: Invent Stone Corp. Opus Pictures
- Distributed by: Opus Pictures; CGV Arthouse
- Release date: April 5, 2017
- Running time: 114 minutes
- Country: South Korea
- Language: Korean
- Box office: US$1.6 million

One Day (Korean: 어느날; RR: Eoneunal) is a 2017 South Korean fantasy drama film directed by Lee Yoon-ki and starring Kim Nam-gil and Chun Woo-hee. The film was released on April 5, 2017.

== Premise ==
The film tells the story of a newly widowed insurance investigator who is handling the case of a woman who goes into a coma after a car accident. He encounters the spirit of the woman when he visits her in the hospital one day, and realizes that he is the only person who can see her.

== Cast ==
- Kim Nam-gil as Lee Kang-soo
- Chun Woo-hee as Dan Mi-so
- Lim Hwa-young as Sun-hwa
- Jung Sun-kyung as Dan Mi-so's mother
- Park Hee-von as Park Ho-jung
- Jung Soon-won as Bum-jin
- Kim Ye-joon as Choi Ji-ho
- Kim Jung-hyun as Assistant manager Cha
- Lee Soo-in as Assistant manager Lee
- Nam Young-sun as Manager Park
- Lee Seung-yeon as Nurse Soo
- Jun Yoo-rim as Jin-young
- Baek Sang-hee as Bartender
- Kim Byung-soon as Sun-hwa's father
- Lee Ji-hoon as Dan Mi-so's doctor
- Jun Han-na as Dan Mi-so's nurse
- Kang Sook as Dan Mi-so's caregiver
- Park Jung-mi as Marriage officiant

=== Cameo appearance ===
- Yoon Je-moon as Choi Doo-yong
- Kim Hye-ok as Sun-hwa's mother
- Sung Joon as Young-woo
- Lee Mi-so as
- Kim Young-min as
- Kim Joong-gi as Kim Man-bok
- Shin Young-jin as Kim Man-bok's wife

== Production ==
Filming began on April 12, 2016, and concluded on July 8, 2016.

== Awards and nominations ==
Year	Award	Category	Nominee	Result
2017	54th Grand Bell Awards	Best Actress	Chun Woo-hee	Nominated
