= Lee Soo-hyuk =

South Korean model and actor (born 1988)

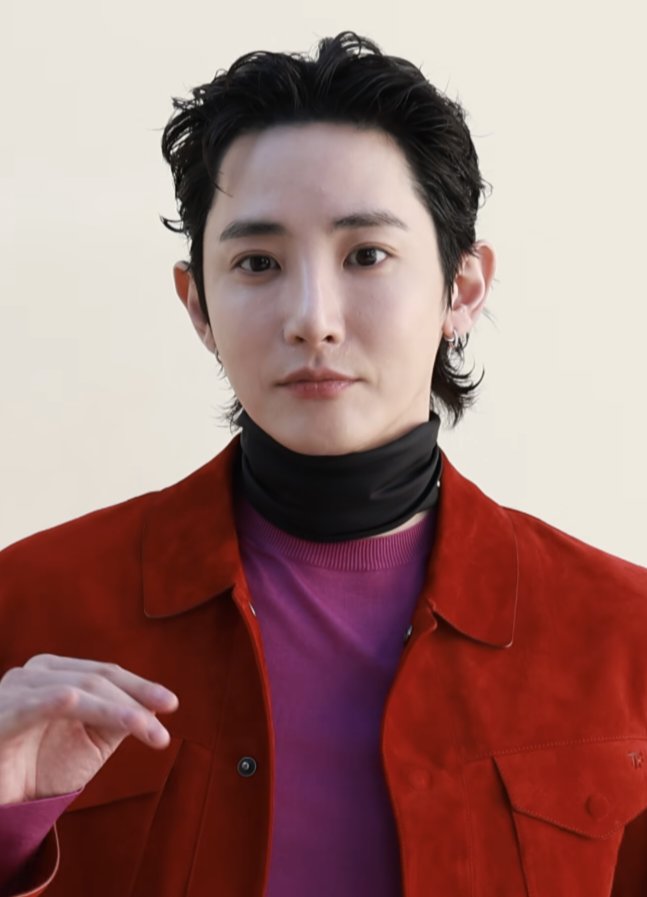
- Lee in June 2026
- Born: Lee Hyuk-soo; May 31, 1988 (age 38); Gwacheon, South Korea
- Occupations: Model; actor
- Years active: 2006–present
- Agent: Saram Entertainment
- Height: 1.84 m (6 ft 1/2 in)

Korean name
- Hangul: 이혁수
- Hanja: 李赫秀
- RR: I Hyeoksu
- MR: I Hyŏksu

Stage name
- Hangul: 이수혁
- Hanja: 李洙赫
- RR: I Suhyeok
- MR: I Suhyŏk

Lee Hyuk-soo (Korean: 이혁수; born May 31, 1988), better known by the stage name Lee Soo-hyuk (이수혁), is a South Korean model and actor. He is best known for starring in Tomorrow (2022) and S Line (2025).

== Life and career ==
Born Lee Hyuk-soo, he debuted as a model in designer Jung Wook-jun's Lone Costume fashion show in 2006. He walked runways for domestic fashion brands including General Idea and Song Zio, and did cover shoots for several fashion magazines such as GQ, Bazaar, and Elle.

After appearing in music videos of girl groups Gavy NJ and 2NE1 in 2009 and 2010, Lee expanded his career into acting. Using the stage name Lee Soo-hyuk, his credits include the television series White Christmas (2011), What's Up (2011), Vampire Idol (2011–2012) and Shark (2013). He also appeared in the films The Boy from Ipanema (2010), Runway Cop (2012), and Horror Stories 2 (2013).

In 2013, Lee went to Europe for Paris Fashion Week and London Fashion Week, where he walked fashion runway shows for Balenciaga, J.W. Anderson, and Balmain. He was named one of the "13 Top Breakout New Male Faces of F/W2013" by the online fashion magazine Style Minutes, being the only Asian model to make the cut among other newbies from Holland, Canada, Brazil, Australia, England, Hungary, Germany, and Lithuania.

In 2014, Lee appeared as a guest judge during season 4 of Korea's Next Top Model, and was invited by Tyra Banks to participate in the season 21 finale of America's Next Top Model. He left his agency, SidusHQ, that same year and signed with Star J Entertainment, subsequently starring in the tvN romantic comedy series' High School King of Savvy—as the second male lead—and Righteous Love. In 2015, Lee was cast in the period vampire romance Scholar Who Walks the Night, based on the webtoon of the same title. This was followed by secondary roles in OCN's espionage drama Local Hero, and the MBC romantic comedies Lucky Romance and Sweet Stranger and Me, in 2016.

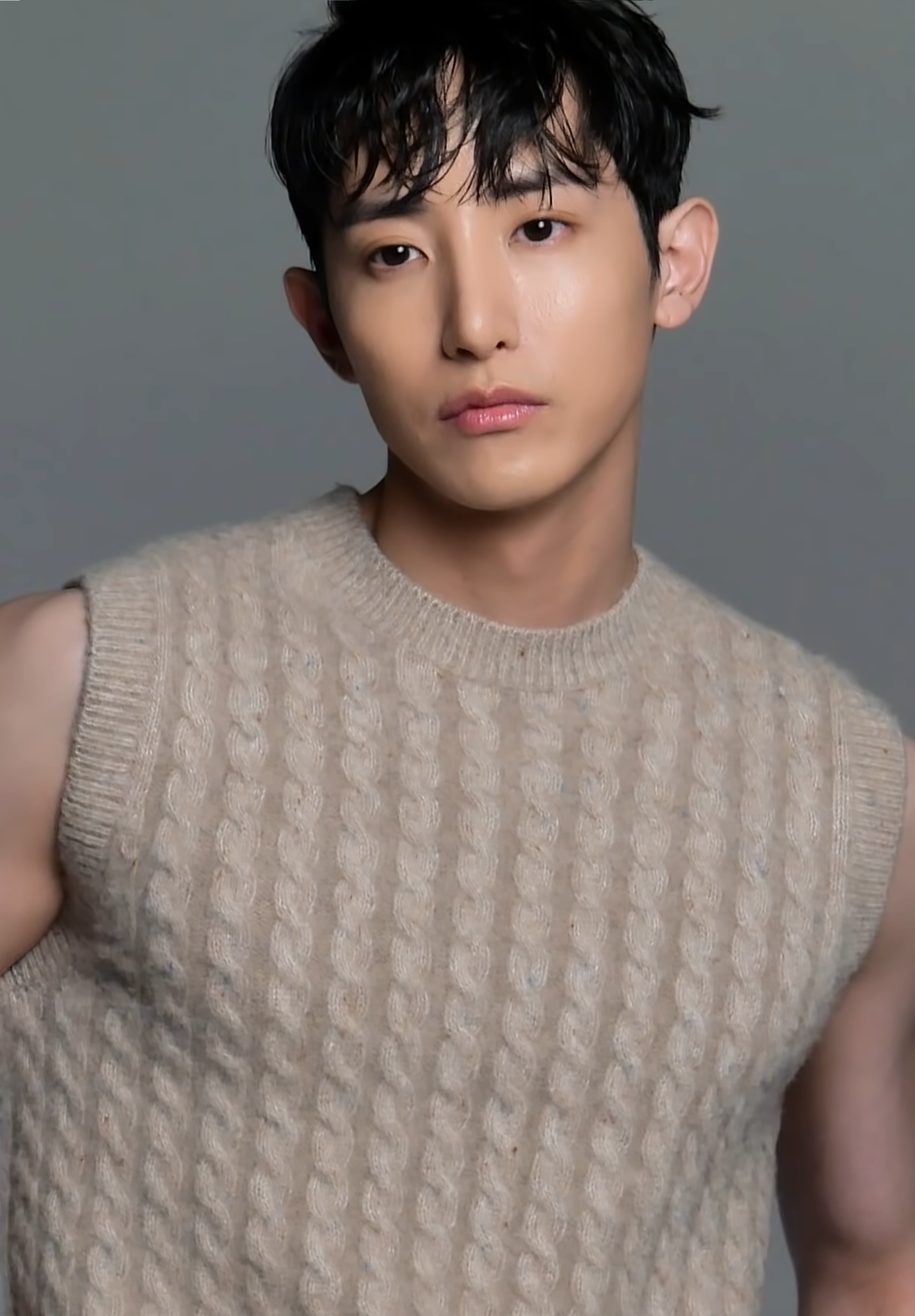
Lee in 2021

Lee joined YG Entertainment in 2017. He was cast in Yoo Ha's crime thriller film Pipeline in 2019. Subsequent projects included lead roles in the mystery romance drama Born Again and the mini web series Handmade Love, both in 2020; the tvN fantasy-romance drama Doom At Your Service in 2021; and the MBC fantasy drama Tomorrow in 2022.

In July 2025, after the expiration of his exclusive contract with YG Entertainment, Lee signed a new contract with Saram Entertainment, which houses prominent actors like Gong Myung and Choi Soo-young. Saram Entertainment stated they would fully support Lee's activities on the global stage, capitalizing on his unique image as an actor and top model. Furthermore, Lee began challenging himself as an MC for the first time since his debut by hosting the K-pop idol audition program, Project 7, starting in October 2024. The program featured other prominent K-pop figures and Lee was named the host, leading the voyage of the audition with an unconventional freshness.

== Endorsements ==
Selected Endorsements (2018–present)
Year	Brand/Product	Role	Notes	Ref.
2018–2019	Adidas	Model / Collaborator	Featured in various fashion campaigns.	
2020	Bulgari	Model	Featured in lifestyle and accessory campaigns.	
2020	Nivea Men	Brand Model	Selected as the new model for skincare products.	
2021	Fahrenheit	Exclusive Face	Represented the men's fashion brand.	

Lee is often booked for fashion editorials in magazines such as GQ, Elle, Harper's Bazaar, W, and Esquire. In 2020, he did fashion editorials for Dior Homme, Balenciaga, and other labels.

== Personal life ==
=== Military service ===
On August 10, 2017, Lee began his mandatory military service. After the basic military training, he continued his service as a public service officer for two years.

== Filmography ==
Key
†	Denotes films that have not yet been released

=== Film ===
Year	Title		Role	Ref.
Year	English	Korean	Role	Ref.
2006	My Boss, My Teacher	투사부일체	Student	
2010	The Boy from Ipanema	이파네마 소년	Boy	
2012	Runway Cop	차형사	Kim Sun-ho	
2013	Horror Stories 2	무서운 이야기 2	Sung-kyun	
2021	Pipeline	파이프라인	Gun-woo	
2025	Sister	시스터	Tae-soo	

=== Television series ===
Year	Title		Role	Notes	Ref.
Year	English	Korean	Role	Notes	Ref.
2011	White Christmas	화이트 크리스마스	Yoon-soo		
2011	Deep Rooted Tree	뿌리 깊은 나무	Yoon Pyeong		
2011	What's Up	왓츠업	Lee Soo-bin		
2011	Vampire Idol	뱀파이어 아이돌	Mukadil Kejua / Soo-hyuk		
2013	Don't Look Back: The Legend of Orpheus	상어	Kim Soo-hyun		
2014	High School King of Savvy	고교처세왕	Yoo Jin-woo		
2014	Righteous Love	일리있는 사랑	Kim Joon		
2015	The Scholar Who Walks the Night	밤을 걷는 선비	Gwi		
2016	Local Hero	동네의 영웅	Choi Chan-gyu		
2016	Lucky Romance	운빨로맨스	Choi Gun-wook		
2016	Sweet Stranger and Me	우리집에 사는 남자	Kwon Duk-bong		
2017	Gomen, Aishiteru	ごめん、愛してる	Baek Rang	Cameo (Episode 1)	
2020	Born Again	본 어게인	Cha Hyung-bin / Kim Soo-hyuk		
2021	Hello, Me!	안녕? 나야!	Police Officer	Cameo (Episode 1)	
2021	Doom at Your Service	어느 날 우리 집 현관으로 멸망이 들어왔다	Cha Joo-ik		
2022	Tomorrow	내일	Park Joong-gil		
2024	Queen Woo	우씨왕후	Go Bal-gi		
2025	S Line	S라인	Han Ji-wook		
2026	Boyfriend on Demand	월간남친	Choi Si-woo	Cameo	

=== Web series ===
Year	Title		Role	Notes	Ref.
Year	English	Korean	Role	Notes	Ref.
2020–2021	Handmade Love	핸드메이드 러브	Woven		
2022	Welcome to Hunam-dong Bookstore	어서 오세요, 휴남동 서점입니다	Hyun Seung-woo	Audio drama	

=== Television shows ===
Year	Title		Role	Notes	Ref.
Year	English	Korean	Role	Notes	Ref.
2008	Seven Models - Special Edition	세븐모델즈 - Special Edition	Cast member	Documentary series	
2013	Style Log 2013	스타일로그 2013	Host	with Hong Jong-hyun	
2020	Like Likes Like	끼리끼리	Regular cast	17 episodes	
2021	Countryside Western Cuisine	시고르 경양식	Regular cast	Server	
2023	Cohabiting, Not Married	결혼 말고 동거	Host		
2024	Project 7	프로젝트 7	Host		

=== Music video appearances ===
Year	Title	Artist	Length	Ref.
2009	"Monorail of Night" (밤의 모노레일)	XXX	4:21	
2009	"A Love Story" (연애소설)	Gavy NJ	5:33	
2010	"It Hurts" (아파)	2NE1	4:15	
2012	"Whoz That Girl"	EXID	4:07	
2013	"Falling in Love"	2NE1	3:47	

== Awards and nominations ==
Name of the award ceremony, year presented, category, nominee(s) of the award, and the result of the nomination
Award ceremony	Year	Category	Nominee(s) / work(s)	Result	Ref.
Elle Style Awards	2024	Best Style Icon (Male)	Lee Soo-hyuk	Won	
Korea Best Dresser Swan Awards	2008	Best Dressed (Model)	Lee Soo-hyuk	Won	
Korea Best Dresser Swan Awards	2014	Best Dressed (Actor)	Lee Soo-hyuk	Won	
Korea Fashion Photographers Association	2007	Best New Model	Lee Soo-hyuk	Won	
MBC Drama Awards	2015	Best New Actor	Scholar Who Walks The Night	Won	
Weibo Gala 2025	2025	Most Popular Korean Artist	Lee Soo-hyuk	Won	
14th Marie Claire Asia Star Awards	2025	Beyond Cinema Award	Lee Soo-hyuk	Won	

=== Other accolades ===
==== Listicles ====
Name of publisher, year listed, name of listicle, and placement
Publisher	Year	Listicle	Placement	Ref.
Style Minutes	2013	13 Top Breakout New Male Faces	Placed	
