= Beauty Water =

2020 South Korean animated film

- Theatrical release poster
- 기기괴괴 성형수
- Directed by: Cho Kyung-hun
- Screenplay by: Lee Han-bin
- Based on: Tales of the Unusual by Oh Seong-dae
- Produced by: Jeon Byung-jin
- Starring: Jang Minhyuk; Moon Nam Sook
- Edited by: Cho Kyung-Hun; Kim Gie-phyo
- Music by: Hong Dae-seong
- Production company: Studio Animal
- Distributed by: M-Line Distribution
- Release date: September 9, 2020
- Running time: 85 minutes
- Country: South Korea
- Language: Korean
- Budget: ₩2 billion
- Box office: ₩900 million

Beauty Water (Korean: 기기괴괴 성형수) is a 2020 South Korean adult animated body horror film directed by Cho Kyung-hun and produced by Studio Animal.

== Synopsis ==
Han Yae-ji, a young, obese makeup artist, takes care of famous actors. She discovers a beauty product called "Beauty Water" that would allow her to lose weight and reshape her body to her liking. After a first purchase on the Internet, Yae-ji enters a state of self-destructive paranoia as she discovers terrifying side effects that begin to affect her.

== See also ==
- South Korean animation
- Ghost Messenger
