= Galhyeon-dong, Seoul =

Coordinates: 37°25′N 126°59′E

Galhyeon-dong
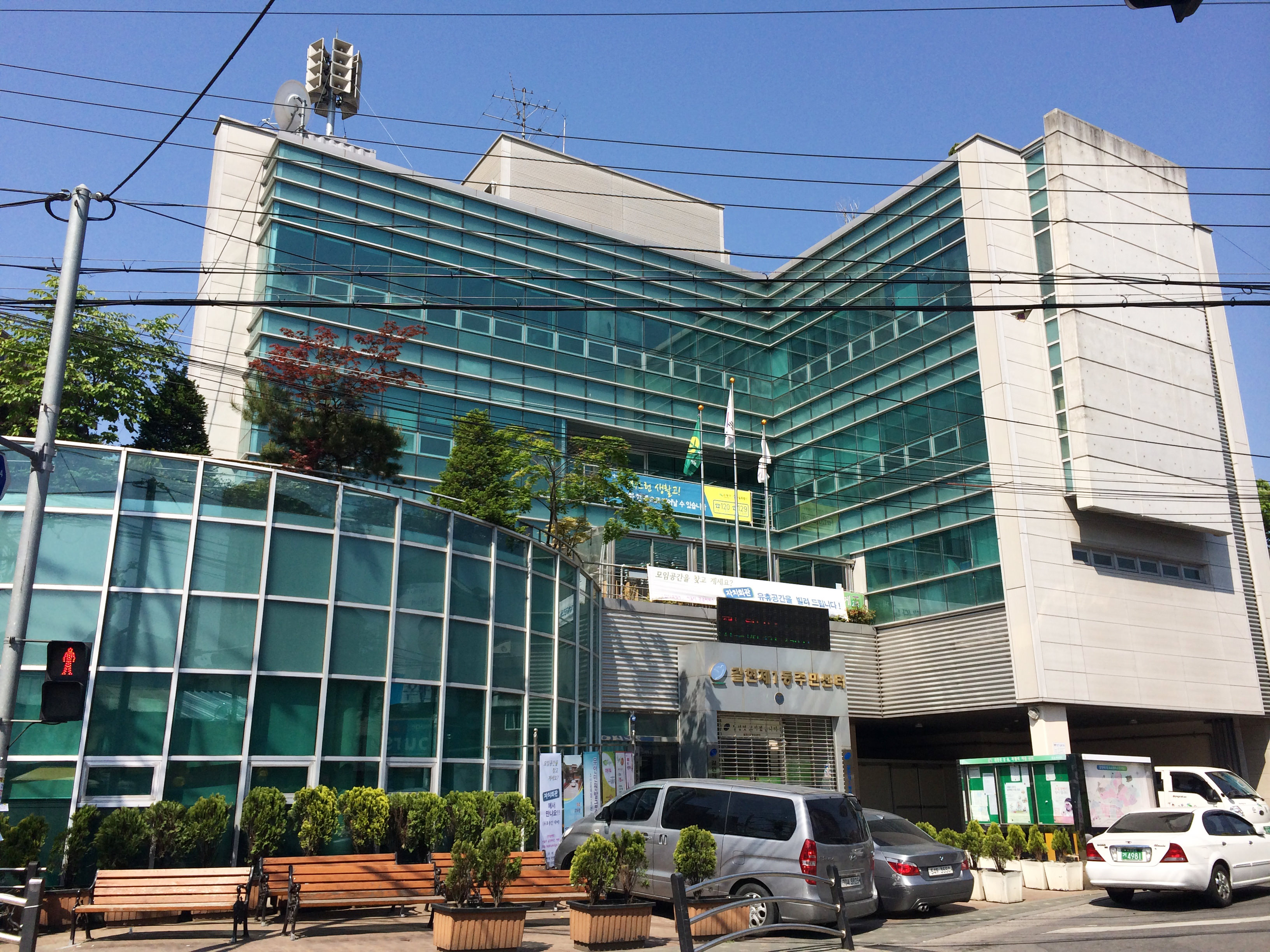
- Galhyeon 1-dong Community Service Center
- Interactive map of Galhyeon-dong
- Country: South Korea

Area
  - Total: 1.93 km^{2} (0.75 sq mi)

Population (2001)
  - Total: 52,208
  - Density: 27,051/km^{2} (70,060/sq mi)

Korean name
- Hangul: 갈현동
- Hanja: 葛峴洞
- RR: Galhyeon-dong
- MR: Karhyŏn-dong

Galhyeon-dong (Korean: 갈현동) is a dong (neighborhood) of Eunpyeong District, Seoul, South Korea. It is divided into two sub-districts, Galhyeon 1-dong and Galhyeon 2-dong. The northern boundary is Jingwan-dong, while Bulgwang-dong lies to the east. To the south, it shares borders with Gusan-dong and Daejo-dong, and to the west lies Changneung-dong in Goyang-si, Gyeonggi-do. As of May 2017, Galhyeon-dong spans an area of 1.93 km^{2} and has a registered resident population of 56,047, with 25,550 residing in Galhyeon 1-dong and 30,497 in Galhyeon 2-dong.

== Etymology ==
The name "Galhyeon" originates from the Chinese character "葛峴", which translates to "Kudzu Pass" or "Galgogae" in Korean. This name was given to the area due to the plentiful presence of arrowroot roots. The Dongguk Yeoji Bigo, a historical record, also refers to this region as "Galgogae".

== See also ==
- Administrative divisions of South Korea
