= The Musical (TV series) =

2011 South Korean television series

- Promotional poster
- Genre: Musical; Romance; Drama
- Written by: Kim Hee-jae
- Directed by: Kim Kyung-yong
- Starring: Koo Hye-sun; Choi Daniel; Park Ki-woong; Ock Joo-hyun
- Country of origin: South Korea
- Original language: Korean
- No. of episodes: 15

Production
- Production locations: South Korea, New York City
- Running time: Fridays at 21:55
- Production companies: Film Book; DVS Korea

Original release
- Network: Seoul Broadcasting System
- Release: 2 September – 23 December 2011

The Musical (Korean: 더 뮤지컬) is a 2011 South Korean television series starring Koo Hye-sun, Choi Daniel, Park Ki-woong, Ock Joo-hyun and Kim Eun-se. It aired on SBS from September 2 to December 23, 2011 on Fridays at 22:00 for 15 episodes.

Filming began in July 2010, and the series was pre-produced before airing. One of the location shoots took place in Broadway, New York City.

== Synopsis ==
The series follows the lives of people in the world of musical theatre, showing the passion and dreams among the producers, songwriters and actors during a musical production. Go Eun-bi is a medical student who loves musicals, and her dream is to be a professional musical theatre actress. Hong Jae-yi was once one of the best composers in Korea, but he quit musical theatre and left the country after his girlfriend, musical theatre diva Bae Kang-hee broke up with him and married another man. When Jae-yi returns to Korea, he accidentally meets Eun-bi and decides to help her achieve her dream. Jae-yi believes that Eun-bi will become a better actress than Kang-hee, and thus their love triangle begins.

== Cast ==
=== Main cast ===
- Koo Hye-sun as Go Eun-bi
- Choi Daniel as Hong Jae-yi
- Park Ki-woong as Yoo Jin
- Ock Joo-hyun as Bae Kang-hee
- Kim Eun-se as Seo Ra-kyung

=== Supporting cast ===
- Park Kyung-lim as Sa Bok-ja
- Kim Hyun-sung as Han Sang-won
- Oh Jung-se as Goo-jak
- Kim Yong-min as Joon-hyuk
- Kim In-seo as Sang-mi
- Lee Do-kyung as Eun-bi's father
- Jung Young-sook as Yang Soon-yi
- Kang Ji-hoo as Hyun Kwang-seo
- Cha Kwang-soo as Yoo Jin-young
- Ahn Yeo-jin as Sun-hee
- Park Geun-hyung as President Yoo
- Kim Ho-young
- Jo Won-hee
- Lee Ji-hyung as Yoo Jae-joon
- Kim Jin-ho as President Seo
- Choo So-young
- Jung Tae
- Seo Bum-suk
- Hong Ji-min (cameo)
- Jo Ji-hoon (cameo)

== International broadcast ==
The series' broadcast rights were sold to Japan ahead of its premiere in South Korea, where it aired on cable channel KNTV.
