= Chae-yeon =

- Hangul: 채연
- RR: Chaeyeon
- MR: Ch'aeyŏn
- IPA: [tɕʰɛjʌn]

Chae-yeon also spelled Chae-yun or Chae-yon is a Korean given name.

== People ==
People with this name include:

- Kim Chae-yeon (actress) (born 1977), South Korean actress
- Chae Yeon (born 1978), South Korean singer
- Jung Chae-yeon (born 1997), South Korean singer, former member of DIA and I.O.I
- Lee Chae-yeon (born 2000), South Korean singer, former member of Iz*One
- Kim Chae-yeon (born 2004), South Korean singer and actress, member of TripleS, former member of Busters and CutieL
- Kim Chae-yeon (born 2006), South Korean figure skater

== Fictional characters ==
Fictional characters with this name include:

- Gyo Chae-yeon from 2014 TV series Birth of a Beauty

== See also ==
- List of Korean given names
