= Kim Woo-taek =

South Korean filmmaker (born 1964)

- 김우택
- Born: July 4, 1964 (age 62); South Korea
- Education: Seoul National University (Bachelor of Business Administration); Emory University (Bachelor of Business Administration)
- Occupation: Filmmaker
- Years active: 2000–present
- Employers: Samsung C&T (1990–1996); Dongyang Global (1996–1997); Tooniverse - On-Media (1997–2001); Megabox (2002–2002); Mediaplex (2002); Showbox-Mediaplex (2002–2003); Megabox (2003); Next Entertainment World (2008–present)

Korean name
- Hangul: 김우택
- Hanja: 金禹澤
- RR: Gim Utaek
- MR: Kim Ut'aek

Kim Woo-taek (Korean: 김우택; born July 4, 1964) is a South Korean producer and entertainment executive. He is the founder and current chairman of Next Entertainment World (NEW), which started as a film investment and distribution company and expanded into the musical, record, and drama business. Kim established himself as a prominent content producer in South Korea after producing major hit drama Descendants of the Sun, as well as the films Miracle in Cell No. 7 and Train to Busan, which garnered 10 million viewers apiece.

Kim's name made into the shortlist of Cine21 magazine's '50 Most Powerful Men in Korean Cinema' for seven consecutive years, spanning from 2001 to 2007.

== Early life and education ==
Kim Woo-taek, born on July 4, 1964, in Seoul, completed his high school education at Hwanil High School in 1984. He went on to graduate from Seoul National University's Department of Business Administration in 1988. In 1990, He earned a master's degree in business administration from Emory University Graduate School in the United States.

He completed the CEO course at Sogang University and the Top Entertainment course at Hanyang University. He also completed the Cultural Content Global Leader Course at Seoul National University.

== Career ==
After obtaining his master's degree in 1990, Kim began his career as an expert in mergers and acquisitions (M&A) in the planning department of the New York City branch of Samsung C&T. In 1996, he further advanced his career by joining Dongyang Global.

In the following year, 1997, he relocated to On-Media, a subsidiary of the Korean food company Orion Group, which had been spun off from Dongyang Group. This move marked his entry into the film industry. At On-Media, he took on the role of general manager of the children's broadcasting channel Tooniverse. In 1999 He moved to another Orion Grup subsidiary Mediaplex established in 1999. Mediaplex brought a new wind to the theater world by operating Megabox Cineplex, which emerged as a representative theater district in Gangnam, Seoul. In 2001, He entered the film business by becoming an assistant managing director at multiplex theater chain Megabox. Kim set a precedent for other theaters by introducing initiatives like hosting a film festival, theater membership, and Thursday releases, all under the slogan "A movie theater that is more fun than a movie."

In December 2002, Kim served as managing director of Mediaplex. On January 24, 2002, Mediaplex's CEO Dam Cheol-gon announced that it will establish a separate corporation called 'Showbox' and begin full-fledged investment in production of Korean films and foreign currency import and distribution business. Regarding this, Mediaplex managing director Kim Woo-taek said, "We will secure high-quality content through close consultation with domestic production and investment companies," adding, "The investment decision for some works has already been finalized, so full-scale sales will begin as early as the second half of this year." "We can get started," he said. Mediaplex also plans to import foreign currency and distribute about 20 domestic and foreign films per year.

Mediaplex was absorbed and merged with Showbox in 2003 and Kim became CEO. During his tenure, Kim's skills were recognized through successful box office achievement starting from Taegukgi (2004). In 2005 with Marathon (5.18 Million viewers), followed by Welcome to Dongmakgol (8 Million viewers) and Family Crisis (5.4 Million viewers), which ranked first, second, and third, respectively. These films secured the 4th, 7th, and 9th positions in the all-time Korean film box office success rankings. Followed by the box office success of The Host (2006). In April 2008 Kim became CEO of Megabox.

In 2008, Kim established a film distribution and investment company called Next Entertainment World (NEW). Starting with only four staff members and a capital of 2 billion won, he initiated this startup enterprise. Seo Dong-wook and Jang Kyung-ik were among the four original members who established NEW. The company's headquarters were situated in a corner of a building in Samseong-dong.

Unfortunately, not long after, a fire broke out in the building. Although there were no casualties, everything was destroyed. Reflecting on the incident, he remarked, "Everything burned down. It was a traumatic experience, but it all depended on how you interpreted it. I believed it was a way for things to fall into place." Undeterred by the setback, he set out to explore new horizons in the entertainment industry. Overcoming the challenges posed by the accident, he started anew from scratch, determined to carve out a fresh path for himself and his company.

NEW established itself in the film industry as a modest yet profitable company during its early years. In its first year of operation, the company boosted its revenue by securing the distribution rights of the Holly Week film Twilight .

In 2010, New began investing in and distributing Korean films in earnest. Its investment strategy involved diversifying its portfolio by producing multiple small, low-budget films, rather than putting all its resources into one project. After The Fixer became a box office success and Hello Ghost exceeded 3 million viewers, the industry began to pay attention to New's strength. Based on his confidence at this time, he began distributing works that were difficult for large companies to invest in, such as Late Blossom and Pietà. Late Blossom was a work that major distributors ignored, saying, "Who would watch a movie featuring a grandfather?" When Director Kim Ki-duk received the honor of the Golden Lion at the 69th Venice International Film Festival for Pietà. Kim Woo-taek as Producer witnessed a moment of glory and history enjoyed by the Korean film industry.

In 2011, Kim made a bold decision to leave his secure position as the CEO of Showbox Mediaplex and assumed position as NEW's CEO.

It was in 2013 that NEW finally garnered significant attention. The company had made its debut in 2012 by releasing blockbuster films like All About My Wife, The Grand Heist, and Pietà. Building on this success, NEW continued to captivate audiences in 2013 with hits such as Miracle in Cell No. 7. NEW continued to captivate audiences in 201, it surpassed competitors like CJ E&M, Showbox, and Lotte, and ranked first in terms of audience with the success of Miracle in Cell No. 7, Hide and Seek (5.6 Million viewers), and New World (4.68 Million viewers).

Miracle in Cell No. 7 and New World were films that were rejected by other major companies. Kim was fascinated by the story of New World. The employees were all against it, but Director Park Hoon-jung asked for a little more time. But the scenario was completely different. When Kim thought about why it became so interesting, it turned out that the story wasn't changed, but the characters were made clearer. Kim think It was so amazing and have trust.

"We communicate with people and make investment decisions based on whether it is enjoyable or not. These criteria remain consistent for all content."—Kim Woo-taek

In August 2013, he established NEW subsidiary Content Panda, a content distribution rights distribution business. Moreover, with the release of The Attorney, another movie that exceeded 10 million views, at the end of 2013, New is enjoying its peak.

In November 2013, NEW supported the 5 billion won project December, a large-scale domestic creative musical held at Sejong Center for the Performing Arts in Seoul from December 6. Directed by Jang Jin and featuring popular artist Kim Junsu, December showcased the songs of Kim Gwang-seok and was a highly anticipated production expected to be a box office success among year-end musicals.

After that period, there was a challenging downhill journey. In 2014 and 2015, Heosamgwan and Daeho encountered significant setbacks, resulting in a sharp decline in stock prices and raising concerns about the Company financial condition. However, Kim Woo-taek remained steadfast in his resolve, showing unwavering determination regardless of the business's performance. In fact, during the past two years, the company has been actively expanding its foundation by establishing divisions dedicated to musicals, sports, and music. Additionally, it has successfully formed connections between China's financial hub and the entertainment industry.

In October 2014, Next Entertainment World (NEW) received an investment of around 53.5 billion won from Huache Media, China's largest entertainment group. This led to speculation that the profits from dramas were going to China. Kim clarified the situation by stating, "While it is true that Huache Media invested in and co-produced Descendants of the Sun, they are not direct investors in the drama but shareholders." He emphasized that the direct profits associated with the drama Descendants of the Sun belong to NEW and KBS, drawing a clear distinction.

In February 2015, he embarked on a sports marketing and management venture through Bravo & New. Notably, Bravo & New also represents the players of the women's national curling team, who captivated the public with their outstanding performance at the Pyeongchang Winter Olympics.

In 2016, NEW has taken its first step into the theater business. On April 1, NEW acquired CGV Sindorim for 30 billion won. CGV Sindorim has a total of 10 theaters and 1,486 seats, and has been operated by CGV.

In the same year NEW released Train to Busan in the summer market, which is considered the largest market of the year. Kim pushed ahead with the Train to Busan project with the belief that even zombies would have potential if the story had power.

"The zombies, freed from their reins, ran at a frightening speed and were eventually able to win the 10 million movie title. I was confident. After watching the movie, I decided that it would be good to put it on the summer market. I myself don't usually watch zombie movies."

Train to Busan set the all-time record for daily attendance (1.28 million) and exceeded 10 million viewers, making it the only film of 2016 to achieve this milestone. It garnered positive reviews from both critics and the public for successfully adapting the zombie theme, commonly found in Hollywood movies, to Korean sensibilities.

NEW's first drama production was the KBS 2TV drama Descendants of the Sun. CEO Kim Woo-taek stated, "I came across 'Descendants of the Sun' by chance. I was exchanging greetings with a junior colleague of mine who mentioned that they were preparing a drama. A few days later, we met and I learned about it, and I was immediately drawn to it." Descendants of the Sun achieved the highest viewership rating of 38.8% in the first half of the year, setting an unprecedented record despite the declining viewership ratings for terrestrial dramas. In June 2016, it received the grand prize in the TV category at the 52nd Baeksang Arts Awards.

In 2018, he was appointed Chairman of Next Entertainment World.

In 2021, NEW (Next Entertainment World, Chairman Kim Woo-taek) signed a content supply contract with OTT service Coupang Play and decided to provide 25 movies.

== Personal life ==
Kim Woo-taek practices Christianity as his religion and follows the motto "Be thankful in everything," derived from a Bible verse.

Kim Woo-taek tries to find something to do with his employees, such as going to a rock café during company dinners and having free discussions while watching plays or musicals.

He married his spouse, Han Mi, on June 16, 1990, and has one son and one daughter. His father-in-law is Han Wan-sang, former Deputy Prime Minister and Minister of Unification.

== Filmography ==
=== Film ===
Feature film credit produced by NEW
Year	Title		Ref.
Year	English	Original	Ref.
2008	Cyborg She	僕の彼女はサイボーグ	
2009	A Season of Good Rain	호우시절	
2010	Poetry	시	
2010	Death Bell 2: Bloody Camp	고死 두번째 이야기 : 교생실습	
2010	Haunters	초능력자	
2010	Late Blossom	그대를 사랑합니다	
2010	Hello Ghost	헬로우 고스트	
2011	Poongsan	풍산개	
2011	Blind	블라인드	
2011	Marrying the Mafia IV	가문의 영광4 – 가문의 수난	
2011	Unbowed	부러진 화살	
2011	Come Rain, Come Shine	사랑한다, 사랑하지 않는다	
2011	The Cat	고양이: 죽음을보는 두개의눈	
2012	Dangerously Excited	나는 공무원이다	
2012	Miss Conspirator	미쓰 GO	
2012	The Grand Heist	바람과 함께 사라지다	
2012	Pietà	피에타	
2012	Ghost Sweepers	점쟁이들	
2012	Love Fiction	러브 픽션	
2012	All About My Wife	내 아내의 모든 것	
2012	Love 911	반창꼬	
2013	The Attorney	변호인	
2013	Cold Eyes	감시자들	
2013	Miracle in Cell No. 7	7번방의 선물	
2013	New World	신세계	
2013	The Fake	사이비	
2013	Hide and Seek	숨바꼭질	
2014	Sea Fog	해무	
2014	For the Emperor	황제를 위하여	
2014	Fashion King	패션왕	
2014	Man in Love	남자가 사랑할 때	
2015	Twenty	스물	
2015	Chronicle of a Blood Merchant	허삼관	
2015	The Phone	더 폰	
2015	Northern Limit Line	연평해전	
2015	The Beauty Inside	뷰티 인사이드	
2015	You Call It Passion	열정 같은 소리 하고 있네	
2015	The Tiger	대호	
2016	Train to Busan	부산행	
2016	Pandora	판도라	
2017	Because I Love You	사랑하기 때문에	
2017	The Mimic	장산범	
2017	The King	더킹	
2017	Lucid Dream	루시드 드림	
2017	One Line	원라인	
2017	What a Man Wants	바람 바람 바람	
2017	The Villainess	악녀	
2017	Steel Rain	강철비	
2018	Psychokinesis	염력	
2018	Herstory	허스토리	
2018	Believer	독전	
2018	The Great Battle	안시성	
2018	Rampant	창궐	
2019	Homme Fatale	기방도령	
2019	Birthday	생일	
2019	Inseparable Bros	나의 특별한 형제	
2019	Cheer Up, Mr. Lee	힘을 내요, 미스터 리	
2019	Start-Up	시동	
2020	Honest Candidate	정직한 후보	
2020	Peninsula	반도	
2020	Night in Paradise	낙원의 밤	
2020	The Call	콜	
2021	Hostage: Missing Celebrity	인질	
2021	Perhaps Love	장르만 로맨스	
2022	Special Delivery	특송	
2022	The Witch: Part 2. The Other One	마녀 2: the other one	
2022	Honest Candidate 2	정직한 후보 2	
2022	The Night Owl	올빼미	
2023	Soulmate	소울메이트	
2023	Long D	롱디	
2023	The Childe	귀공자	
2023	Smugglers	밀수	
2023	Marrying the Mafia: Returns	가문의 영광:리턴즈	

=== Television series ===
Television drama credits
Year	Title		Network	Director	Production house	Ref.
Year	English	Korean	Network	Director	Production house	Ref.
2016	Descendants of the Sun	태양의 후예	KBS2	Lee Eung-bok; Baek Sang-hoon	KBS; Next Entertainment World; Barunson Inc.; Descendants of the Sun SPC	
2018	Ms. Hammurabi	미스 함무라비	JTBC	Kwak Jung-hwan	Studio&NEW	
2018	The Beauty Inside	뷰티 인사이드	JTBC	Song Hyun-wook	Studio&NEW; Yong Film	
2019	Chief of Staff	보좌관	JTBC	Kwak Jung-hwan	Studio&NEW	
2020	Oh My Baby	오 마이 베이비	tvN	Nam Ki-hoon	Studio&NEW; Studio Dragon	
2020	Graceful Friends	우아한 친구들	JTBC	Song Hyun-wook	Studio&NEW; SLL; JCN	
2020–2021	Delayed Justice	날아라 개천용	SBS TV	Kwak Jung-hwan	Studio&NEW	
2021	Doom at Your Service	어느 날 우리 집 현관으로 멸망이 들어왔다	tvN	Kwon Young-il	Studio&NEW; Studio Dragon	
2021	The Devil Judge	악마판사	tvN	Choi Jung-kyu	Studio&NEW; Studio Dragon	
2023	Doctor Cha	닥터 차정숙	JTBC	Kim Dae-jin; Kim Jung-wook	Studio&NEW; SLL; JCN	
2023–2024	Tell Me That You Love Me	사랑한다고 말해줘	ENA	Kim Yoon-jin	Studio&NEW; Artist Studio	
2024	Good Partner	굿파트너	SBS TV	Kim Ga-ram	Studio S; Studio&NEW	
2024	Good Boy	굿보이	JTBC	Shim Na-yeon	SLL; Drama House Studio	

=== Web series ===
Web series
Year	Title		OTT	Director	Production house	Credited as		Ref.
Year	English	Korean	OTT	Director	Production house	Planner	Investor	Ref.
2022	Rookie Cops	너와 나의 경찰수업	Disney+	Kim Byung-soo	Studio&NEW; The Walt Disney Company (Korea)	No	Yes	
2023	Moving	무빙	Disney+	Park In-je	Studio&NEW; Mr. Romance; The Walt Disney Company (Korea)	Yes	Yes	
2024	The Tyrant	폭군	Disney+	Park Hoon-jung	Goldmoon; Studio&NEW	No	Yes	

== Stage ==
Musical play(s) credits
Year	Title		Credited as	Restage	Ref.
Year	English	Korean	Credited as	Restage	Ref.
2013	December: Unfinished Song	디셈버: 끝나지 않은 노래	Investor	2014	

== Accolades ==
=== Award and nomination ===
Awards and nominations received by Kim
Award	Year	Category	Recipient	Result	Ref.
2nd Cultural Contents Global Leader Award from the Seoul National University Cultural Contents Global Leader Course Alumni Association	2009	Global Leader Award	Kim Woo-taek	Won	
69th Venice International Film Festival	2012	Golden Lion Award	Pietà	Won	
69th Venice International Film Festival	2012	Golden Mouse	Pietà	Won	
69th Venice International Film Festival	2012	Leoncino d'Oro Agiscuola Award (Little Golden Lion)	Pietà	Won	
69th Venice International Film Festival	2012	Nazareno Taddei Award	Pietà	Won	
Black Movie Film Festival	2012	Critics Prize	Pietà	Nominated	
Tokyo Filmex	2012	Audience Award	Pietà	Won	
32nd Korean Association of Film Critics Awards	2012	Best Film	Pietà	Won	
32nd Korean Association of Film Critics Awards	2012	FIPRESCI Award	Pietà	Won	
49th Grand Bell Awards	2012	Best Film	Pietà	Nominated	
33rd Blue Dragon Film Awards	2012	Best Film	Pietà	Won	
17th Satellite Awards	2012	Best Foreign Language Film	Pietà	Won	
4th KOFRA Film Awards	2012	Best Film	Pietà	Won	
23rd Fantasporto Director's Week	2012	Best Film	Pietà	Won	
7th Asian Film Awards	2012	Best Film	Pietà	Nominated	
49th Baeksang Arts Awards	2012	Best Film	Pietà	Nominated	
5th Filmmaker of the Year Award hosted by the Korean Film Journalists Association	2014	Filmmaker of the Year Award	Kim Woo-taek	Won	
16th Udine Far East Film Festival	2014	Black Dragon Audience Award	The Attorney (Note: Award shared with Choi Jae-won)	Won	
16th Udine Far East Film Festival	2014	First Runner-up, Golden Mulberry Award	The Attorney	Won	
50th Baeksang Arts Awards	2014	Best Film	The Attorney	Won	
23rd Buil Film Awards	2014	Best Film	The Attorney	Nominated	
23rd Buil Film Awards	2014	Buil Reader's Jury Award	The Attorney	Won	
35th Blue Dragon Film Awards	2014	Best Film	The Attorney	Won	
51st Grand Bell Awards	2014	Best Film	The Attorney	Nominated	
Max Movie Award	2014	Best Film	The Attorney	Nominated	

=== Listicle ===
Listicle of Kim
Publisher	Year	List	Placement	Ref.
Cine21	2001	Chungmuro 50 Power Filmmaker	18th	
Cine21	2002	Chungmuro 50 Power Filmmaker	20th	
Cine21	2003	Chungmuro 50 Power Filmmaker	8th	
Cine21	2004	Chungmuro 50 Power Filmmaker	5th	
Cine21	2005	Chungmuro 50 Power Filmmaker	4th	
Cine21	2006	Chungmuro 50 Power Filmmaker	3rd	
Cine21	2007	Chungmuro 50 Power Filmmaker	4th	
E-Daily	2016	Best Cultural Leader	4th (Note: Tied with Kim Eun-sook (10 votes, 7.5%))	
Herald Economy	2013	Pop Culture Power Leader Big 30	10th	
Herald Economy	2014	Pop Culture Power Leader Big 30	12th	
Korea CXO Research Institute (Note: the Korea CXO Research Institute is a corporate analysis agency)	2023	34 people in the '10 billion club' of culture and content stocks	8th	
Leader+ (Note: Business People (www.businesspeople.co.kr), a recruitment portal for experienced executives and professionals)	2019	10 Leaders who Lead K-Culture	Top 10	
MaxMovie	2016	Power Creator 30 selected by MaxMovie Film Research Institute	Top 30	
Money Today Star News (Note: in celebration of the 3rd anniversary of Money Today Star News (September 1))	2007	Entertainment Power Number One	4th	
