= Choi Jae-won =

South Korean filmmaker (born 1967)

- 최재원
- Born: 1967 (age 58–59); South Korea
- Education: Department of Agricultural Economics of Korea University
- Occupation: Filmmaker
- Years active: 2000–present
- Employers: Korea Industrial Securities; Infinite Technology Investment; iPictures; Barunson E&A; Next Entertainment World; Warner Bros. Korea; Anthology Studio (2020–present)
- Organization: Korean Film Council (January 2020 to January 2022)
- Spouse: Undisclosed
- Children: 2

Korean name
- Hangul: 최재원
- Hanja: 崔載元
- RR: Choe Jaewon
- MR: Ch'oe Chaewŏn

Choi Jae-won (Korean: 최재원; Hanja: 崔載元; born 1967) is a South Korean film investor, planner, and producer, as well as the co-founder and current CEO of Anthology Studio, a subsidiary of Studio LuluLala. He started his career as security analyst at a venture capital company. He became film investor after he introduced South Korea's first film investment fund.

Throughout his career, he has held CEO positions at iPictures, Barunson E&A, Next Entertainment World, and withUs Film. Moreover, he has served as the former head of Warner Bros. Korea, fostering collaboration between the domestic film market and major Hollywood studios.

Choi Jae-won has overseen the investment, production, and distribution of numerous critically acclaimed films. His portfolio includes collaborations with director Kim Jee-woon's A Tale of Two Sisters and The Good, the Bad, the Weird (2008); as well as Bong Joon-ho's Memories of Murder, The Host, and Mother. He also worked on Yang Woo-suk's 2013 film Yang Woo-suk's The Attorney (2013), which sold over ten million tickets and ranks among the highest-grossing films in South Korean box office history.

In 2020, the Ministry of Culture, Sports and Tourism appointed Choi Jae-won as one of seven members of the Korean Film Council (KOFIC). He served a two year term from January 3, 2020, to January 3, 2022. During this tenure, he was also appointed vice chairman of the council in January 2021.

== Early life and education ==
Choi Jae-won was born in 1967. After attending Seondeok High School, he enrolled in Korea University in 1986. He studied in the Department of Agricultural Economics, which has since been renamed the Department of Food and Resource Economics. Although he aspired to attend art school, he abandoned the idea due to his father's opposition. During college, he pursued his creative interests through theater. Choi later worked as a writer for the Korea Broadcasting Corporation.

== Career ==
=== Early career ===
Following his graduation, Choi began his career as a securities analyst at Korea Industrial Securities, a venture capital firm. Despite earning a high salary, he decided in his early 30s to pivot toward film investment. Choi's path into the industry began in 1997 when he joined Infinite Technology Investment, a mid sized startup led by CEO Lee In-gyu. By 1998, while focusing on online investment, Choi developed a keen interest in the film sector. In early 1999, he was introduced to Uni Korea by Moon Seong-keun to discuss forming a venture fund, though the partnership did not materialize. Choi's transition to filmmaking career brought significant financial hardships, including the sale of his Gangnam apartment and a move to a rented home on the outskirts of Seoul. Despite these challenges, he remained committed to his goal of producing at least one film that would deeply resonate with audiences.

While still serving as director at Infinite Technology Investment, around June of that year, Choi met Sidus Pictures' CEO, Cha Seung-jae and they started working with CJ Entertainment. Success finally arrived in mid December when Cha secured the support of CEO of Showbox, Director Kang Woo-suk. Together, they established an ₩11.5 billion venture fund named the Cha Seung-jae Venture Fund. To operate this fund, Choi and Cha cofounded iPictures Co., Ltd. (아이픽처스), a joint investment between Infinite Technology Investment and Sidus. Choi and Cha jointly led iPictures, a company specializing in practical investments across the visual content industry, including planning, production, marketing, distribution, and merchandising. The fund's inaugural investment was Bong Joon-ho's commercial film debut, Barking Dogs Never Bite.

"Director Bong Joon-ho's Barking Dogs Never Bite probably cost around 900 million won from what I remember. I have only started investing in movies, and I think the market environment then was better than it is now. In the past, when there were rumors of a crisis, it was actually a crisis of production capital. If we judge that the current crisis is a crisis of production capital, consumers' behavior patterns have changed, consumption habits have changed, and content distribution has changed."—Choi on his first film investment.

In August 2000, Choi was appointed head of the Content Team at Infinite Technology Investment. By January 2001, he expanded the firm's portfolio beyond cinema to include games and online platforms, with investments in entities such as Web Cinema, Easy Club, and Geoinet. During this period, the firm invested in 20 films and animations, including the box office success Kick the Moon, Musa, and Indian Summer.

Choi also oversaw the expansion of venture capital resources. On September 24, 2001, Infinite Technology Investment established MBC Infinite Video Venture Fund No. 1 and No. 2, with capitalizations of ₩5 billion and ₩50 billion, respectively. For the first fund, MBC contributed ₩4.2 billion while Infinite Technology Investment provided ₩800 million, with a primary focus on MBC produced content. The second fund targeted the broader film industry, drawing capital from diverse members including the Korea Local Administrative Mutual Aid Fund, the Korean Film Council, Sunwoo Entertainment, Sidus Pictures, and Enter One.

In 2002, the investment scale was estimated at ₩30 billion, including ongoing productions. The firm focused on Sidus Pictures projects, with plans to invest in 14 works. These included Kim Young-bin's film Balhae, produced for ₩4.5 billion; the horror film A Tale of Two Sisters, and the animation Adventure in the East River. However, the year's financial performance was mixed. Among iPictures' primary investments in 2002, only Marriage Is a Crazy Thing proved profitable, earning ₩1 billion. Other major projects incurred significant losses, including My My Beautiful Girl, Mari (₩2 billion), Jungle Juice (₩300 million), and Road Movie (₩900 million), totaling a ₩3.2 billion deficit. While Cha Seung-jae was initially responsible for selecting projects, he eventually withdrew from the fund as box office performance declined.

Starting in September 2002, Choi began operating iPictures independently from Infinite Technology Investment. Although he requested the transfer of the remaining funds he had managed, Infinite Investment declined. Despite personal concerns regarding his transition from a salaried employee to an independent entrepreneur, Choi leveraged his industry expertise to move forward. He committed to two major projects Madeleine and A Tale of Two Sisters, which represented a new chapter for the company.

Although Madeleine (2003) incurred a loss of approximately 1.5 billion KRW, leaving the company's survival in question, the release of Kim Jee-woon's A Tale of Two Sisters proved to be a turning point. The film attracted 3.15 million viewers nationwide and generated at least ₩3 billion for i-Pictures. Choi's investment was particularly high risk because the lead actors, Im Soo-jung and Moon Geun-young, were newcomers at the time. Their casting led other investors to withdraw their support, forcing Choi to cover the investment single handedly. Following the film's significant success, he shared the profits with the crew, a gesture that was unprecedented in the Korean film industry.

iPictures saw further success in 2003 with other major investments. Bong Joon-ho's thriller Memories of Murder drew 5.3 million viewers, while the melodrama Singles reached an audience of 2.5 million. By acquiring a 30% stake in Memories of Murder and a 22% stake in Singles, Choi ensured that both films would generate a net profit exceeding ₩2 billion.

In 2004, Choi served as the primary investor for Lim Chan-sang's The President's Barber. Although the initial production cost was ₩4 billion, their total investment reached close to ₩10 billion. Starring Song Kang-ho and Moon So-ri, the film depicts four decades of South Korean history through the perspective of a barber selected to serve President Park Chung-hee. Despite receiving critical acclaim upon its release on May 5, 2004, the film did not reach its break-even point and was considered a box office disappointment.

=== Barunson and Next Entertainment World (NEW) ===
Following the failure of their latest film, The President's Barber, iPictures experienced bankruptcy, prompting Choi to consider a return to the financial world. However, he made the decision to delve into film production instead. On November 9, 2005, Choi sold iPictures to Barunson Co., Ltd. This acquisition allowed Barunson to expand its presence in the entertainment industry and establish Barunson Entertainment. Prior to the acquisition, iPictures had been involved in the film business since 2000 through a Venture Fund and had ranked as the third-largest company in terms of investment performance, trailing behind Cinema Service and CJ Entertainment.

After the acquisition, Choi took on the leadership role in the film business division at Barunson. The division's goal was to produce, co-produce, and invest in more than 10 films annually, starting from the following year. Notably, the division had already secured investment contracts. At the time, Choi signed a contract with directors Kim Jee-woon and Bong Joon-ho for two films each, which was an unprecedented move in the industry. Both director Kim Jee-woon's film A Bittersweet Life (2005) and Bong Joon-ho's film The Host (2006) were both critically and commercially successful.

In 2005, Choi transitioned into a producer role while overseeing Barunson's film division. The first film he produced was director Yim Pil-sung's film Hansel and Gretel. It began filming in April 2007.

Choi was also involved in the investment and production of Kim Jee-woon's film The Good, the Bad, and the Weird. It began filming in May 2007. It garnered immediate public attention due to the presence of three renowned actors: Song Kang-ho, Lee Byung-hun, and Jung Woo-sung. It faced challenges such as production delays in China which resulted in increased production costs, and a recession in the Korean film market. Concerns arose regarding the film's potential success. However, following its premiere at the Cannes Film Festival, the film received a string of favorable reviews. It quickly surpassed seven million viewers, making it highly likely to achieve profitability. As the CEO of Barunson Entertainment, Choi personally experienced the hardships and pressures endured by both actors and directors, from the initial stages of film production to the screening phase. If a project featuring such reputable actors and a director fails to achieve success, the responsibility squarely falls on the producer.

A year later, Choi served as a producer for director Bong Joon-ho's film Mother. Choi shared insights about the film. He described Mother as a unique Korean film that explores the theme of motherhood using a mother's perspective. The movie had elements of a feminine thriller and mystery, giving it a distinctive style not commonly seen in previous Korean films. He mentioned that the film had a dreamlike quality despite being grounded in realism. Choi also highlighted the universal relevance found in the director's previous work, The Host, and the tension present in Memories of Murder. Overall, Mother successfully combined these elements, creating a more accessible portrayal of the mother-child relationship.

In 2007, he was ranked 38th in the list of Cine21 Chungmuro 50 Power Filmmaker. He was chosen for his ability to quickly adapt to director branding trends and for his innovative approach of combining capital and talent directly, without relying on a production company as an intermediary. Although his experimental film business model, which involved investing based on the abundant capital of a listed company and establishing a production unit directly, had yet to be fully proven. It was anticipated that he would demonstrate a certain level of efficiency given the growing influence of directors in the industry.

In 2009, after leaving Barunson, Choi became Co-CEO of film distribution company Next Entertainment World (NEW). NEW was founded in 2008 by Kim Woo-taek, former Showbox CEO. Under Choi's leadership, NEW collaborated with Uni Korea Literary Investment, a film importer, to bring the 2005 Indian film Black into the market. Despite a lack of interest from other importers and major distributors, who believed the film had low domestic awareness and had already been widely seen, Uni Korea Literary Investment acquired the copyright after it topped the charts for illegal downloads in late 2007. NEW made the decision to release the film in 200 theaters. Although the import price was not disclosed, it was mentioned that the total investment, including copyright and marketing costs, amounted to approximately ₩1.2 billion—a surprisingly low figure. Nevertheless, the film went on to generate over ₩4 billion in box office revenue.

=== Establishing withUs Film and venturing into film production ===
In May 2010, CEO Choi established withUs Film (Korean: 위더스필름) and ventured into full-fledged film production. Together with Youth Film, withUs Film co-produced Director Kim Seok-yoon's film Detective K: Secret of the Virtuous Widow. Based on the novel "Secret of the Virtuous Women's Gate" by Kim Tak-hwan, the film centers on a mystery that portrays the clandestine power struggle among political factions during King Jeongjo's reign, focusing on the death of a woman. The film features Kim Myung-min, Oh Dal-su, Han Ji-min in lead roles, and Lee Jae-yong, Woo Hyun, Yeo Su-jeong, Choi Moo-sung, and Jeong In-ki in supporting roles. Released on January 27, 2011, the movie had nearly 4 million viewers by February 18. With a budget of ₩6 billion, it was expected to earn around ₩13 billion at the box office, twice its production cost.

Afterwards, Choi produced director E J-yong's film Behind the Camera, which garnered significant interest for offering an authentic behind-the-scenes look at renowned actors including Youn Yuh-jung, Park Hee-soon, Kim Min-hee, Kim Ok-vin, Kang Hye-jung, Ryu Deok-hwan, Oh Jung-se, Choi Hwa-jung, Kim C, Kim Nam-jin, Lee Ha-nui, Jung Eun-chae, and Esom. The film was premiered to audiences through the 'Korean Film Today' section of the 2012 Busan International Film Festival. It was invited to the Panorama section of the 63rd Berlin International Film Festival.

Choi's (withUs Film's) third work was The Attorney, which marked the directorial debut of Yang Woo-suk. The film drew inspiration from the real-life Burim case that took place in 1981 during the authoritarian Chun Doo-hwan regime. It chronicles the transformative journey of Song Woo-seok, portrayed by Song Kang-ho, a struggling tax lawyer, as he faces five intense trials and forges significant relationships along the way.

"This movie was conceived around early May 2012. I went to school (his alma mater) unexpectedly met juniors, but college students these days are not interested in society or anything else, and their only goal is to get a job. So, it reminded me a lot of when I was in school. (Note: For reference, CEO Choi is a member of the Class of 1986, and Director Woo-seok Yang is a member of the Class of 1988.) I thought, why don't we tell a story about how in our 20s, we talked about democracy and the people while giving up our vested rights and risking our lives to fight for them?"—Choi about the planning motif of The Attorney.

CJ ENM and Showbox had expressed their interest in distributing The Attorney, but Jang Kyung-ik, the CEO of NEW's film division, reached out to Choi to inquire why the proposal had not been shared with him. Additionally, NEW's CEO, Kim Woo-taek, personally contacted Choi regarding the film. In the end, withUs Film signed an investment and distribution agreement with NEW. NEW's persistence paid off when The Attorney, made with a production cost of approximately ₩7.5 billion, achieved remarkable success at the box office. The film sold over 11 million tickets and generated ₩82.9 billion in revenue. It was the second highest-grossing Korean film in 2013. Currently, it holds the 17th rank among the highest-grossing Korean films of all time.

=== Warner Brothers ===
In 2014, while still holding the title of "Producer of The Attorney," Choi was offered a position at Warner Bros. Korea. Despite initial hesitation, his curiosity about the company's 90-year presence in the global film industry and the belief in effectively utilizing overseas film capital led him to accept the offer. He officially joined Warner Bros. Korea on January 1, 2015.

Choi admires Warner Bros.'s deep trust placed in creators. Directors like Clint Eastwood, who have longstanding relationships with the company, are given significant creative freedom. The emphasis is on providing unwavering support for the creative process while carefully managing schedules and budgets once decisions are made. Choi believes that incorporating aspects of the Hollywood approach can positively impact the Korean film production environment. By "Koreanizing" these methods, he envisions fostering the growth and development of the local film industry.

Warner Bros. Korea made an entry into the Korean film market with its inaugural film, The Age of Shadows. On August 3, 2015, Warner Bros. Korea announced their involvement in financing and distributing their first Korean-language film set in the 1930s, tentatively titled "Secret Agent." The movie, with a budget of $8.62 million, was being co-produced by Grimm Pictures. The film has an impressive lineup with Lee Jin-sook as the scriptwriter and Kim Jee-woon as the director. The talented cast includes Song Kang-ho and Gong Yoo. On July 14, 2016, a trailer was released, unveiling the film's new title, The Age of Shadows. On August 30, 2016, The Korean Film Council (KOFIC) announced that The Age of Shadows had been selected as South Korea's official entry for the best foreign-language film category at the 89th Academy Awards.

The film dominated Chuseok holiday with 7.5 million viewers. Its success allowed Warner Bros. to surpass the four major domestic film companies and claim the top spot in the Korean film distribution market, as reported by the Korea Film Council in September. Securing the top position holds great significance, considering that it was the first film produced domestically by a direct Hollywood distribution company. With The Age of Shadows's success, Choi accomplished a smooth establishment of a local production with an overseas distributor, successfully avoiding trial and error. This achievement not only alleviated anxieties surrounding overseas companies but also positioned Warner Bros. as a prominent player in the market. Their financial strength, adaptable planning and development system, and openness to new ideas also played a crucial role.

In the same year, Warner Bros. Korea collaborated with Park Hoon-jung to produce the crime-action thriller film V.I.P., starred Jang Dong-gun, Kim Myung-min, Park Hee-soon, and Lee Jong-suk. It centered around the pursuit of a serial killer by officers from South Korea, North Korea, and Interpol. Despite featuring a renowned cast, the film did not perform well at the box office. Moreover, V.I.P. received a lot of criticism its excessive portrayal of violence against women.

Warner Bros. Korea established Hwayi-Warner Content Venture Fund. It was first film fund formed by Warner Brothers Korea in Korea. Huayi Investment is in charge of the operation. major domestic and foreign content companies and capital companies joined, including Warner Brothers Korea, Huayi Brothers Korea, Huayi-Tencent Entertainment, FNC Ad Culture, and Next Entertainment World. Next Entertainment World invested in The Battleship Island in July 2017 by participating as an investor of Hwayi-Warner Content Venture Fund.

Between 2017 and 2018, Warner Bros. and Kim Jee-woon collaborated on the production of the science fiction action film Illang: The Wolf Brigade. This movie serves as a remake of the 1999 anime film Jin-Roh: The Wolf Brigade Boasting an impressive ensemble cast that includes Gang Dong-won, Han Hyo-joo, Jung Woo-sung, Kim Mu-yeol, and Choi Min-ho, the film was released during the summer of 2018. With a production cost of 19 billion won (equivalent to US$17.04 million), Warner Bros. Despite receiving mixed reviews and falling short of expectations at the domestic box office, with approximately 897,000 tickets sold as opposed to its break-even point of six million tickets, it competed for the Golden Shell at the San Sebastián International Film Festival, making it the second South Korean film to do so. Additionally, Netflix acquired the international distribution rights for the film.

In 2018, Warner Bros. once again collaborated with Park Hoon-jung again in science fiction action horror film The Witch: Part 1. The Subversion. This marked the third collaboration between Park Hoon-jung and Park Hee-soon. The film also featured actress Jo Min-soo and actor Choi Woo-shik. For the role of Ja-yoon, a high school student who loses her memory after escaping from a facility where a mysterious accident occurred, a rookie actress named Kim Da-mi was chosen for the role of Ja-yoon after competing against odds of 1,500 to 1. was chosen after competing against odds of 1,500 to 1. The story revolves around Ja-yoon, as she tries to uncover the truth behind the incident that caused multiple deaths in a hidden facility.

Except for The Witch: Part 1. The Subversion, which attracted 3.18 million viewers, Illang: The Wolf Brigade, Jesters: The Game Changers, and The Battle of Jangsari received disappointing result, leading Choi to think hard about what kind of movie to make. One way to get an answer is to pay more attention to content that younger employees find interesting. Choi makes the final decision among the works selected by employees. As a result, film of The Day I Died: Unclosed Case, Josée, and Killing Romance were scheduled to be released.

In September 2020, Warner Bros. Korea decided to withdraw from the Korean film industry due to underwhelming results from their recent productions. This withdrawal has generated uncertainty regarding the highly anticipated sequel, The Witch 2, following the success of the first installment, The Witch: Part 1. The Subversion, which attracted 3.18 million viewers upon its release in 2018.

=== Anthology Studio ===
Following his departure from Warner Bros. Korea, Choi, together with director Kim Jee-woon and actor Song Kang-ho, founded a film production company named Anthology Studio (앤솔로지스튜디오). It was established on November 17, 2020.

In December 2021, JTBC Studios acquired 100% stake of Anthology Studio for 20 billion won. It appears that the funds converted into cash from the sale of shares were used for paid-in capital increase. All Anthology Studio's founders have become shareholders of JTBC Studio. JTBC Studio issued 767,077 shares of common stock to Choi, director Kim Jee-woon and actor Song Kang-ho, as well as Paan Co., Ltd., a film company founded by Choi and actor Song Kang-ho. Song's wife, Hwang Jang-sook, currently serves as Paan Co., Ltd.'s executive director. The price per share was confirmed at 16,048 won. The size of the capital increase is 12.3 billion won. This capital increase involved Choi investing 3.4 billion won, Kim Jee-woon investing 2.9 billion won, and Paan Co., Ltd. investing 6 billion won to JTBC Studio. The acquired stocks are subject to a one-year lock-up period.

Anthology Studio first work, where Choi also served as producer was Kim Jee-woon's Cobweb, a period black comedy-drama film directed starring Song Kang-ho, Im Soo-jung, Oh Jung-se, Jeon Yeo-been, and Krystal Jung. Principal photography began on March 8, 2022, and concluded on June 6, 2022.

On March 30, 2022, JTBC Studio underwent a name change and became 'SLL (Studio LuluLala),' with a vision to expand its reach in the global content market. Anthology Studio become label of SLL. On April 19, the SLL Media Day event, 'Let's LuluLala,' took place at Dongdaemun Design Plaza (DDP) in Jung-gu, Seoul. Present at the event were SLL CEO Jeong Kyeong-moon, SLL Production Division 1 Director Park Jun-seo, SLL Strategy Department Director Choi Jae-hyuk, Climax Studio CEO Byun Seung-min, Film Monster director Lee Jae-gyu, and Anthology Studio CEO Choi Jae-won.

On March 21, 2023, photo of the partnership signing ceremony between Choi, representing Anthology Studio, and Kumar Mangat, CEO of Padak Panorama Studio was released. On that day, Panorama Studio India made the announcement that the two studios will collaborate to produce the remake of Drishyam, which signifies the first-ever collaboration between an Indian and a Korean studio. Additionally, it will be the first time a Hindi film is officially remade in the Korean language. Anthology has plans to remake all three films in the Drishyam franchise, and production for the first installment is expected to commence in 2024.

In May 2023, Cobweb premiered in the non-competitive section at the 2023 Cannes Film Festival. The film was released theatrically on September 27, 2023, coinciding with Korean Chuseok holidays.

The 28th Busan International Film Festival hosted the 'Asia Content & Film Market - Korea, US, and Japan content production environment and global market strategy' session at BEXCO Exhibition Hall 1 in Haeundae District, Busan. Anthology Studio CEO Choi Jae-won, director Anthony Shim, David Flynn, and Anthology Studio producer Song Sun-ho attended and unveiled the 'Anthology Studio Global Project Lineup.' This lineup includes 'Offering,' 'D-1,' and 'The Hole,' which are novel-based works transformed into global content.

Anthology Studios and Anonymous Content are to produce "Offering," an acclaimed Korean coming-of-age novel written by Michael Kim. Anthony Shim, the Canadian Korean director behind Toronto International Film Festival's winning film Riceboy Sleeps, is served as writer and director. Kim Jee-woon is set to direct the adaptation of the novel The Hole. In the case of D-1, which is adapted from the novel "Oh Sister" and produced by SLL global label Wiip and Anthology Studio, the plan is to develop it as a film in Korea and as a series in the United States.

== Other activities ==
In 2020, The Ministry of Culture, Sports and Tourism appointed Choi Jae-won as one of seven non-executive members of the Korean Film Council (KOFIC). The term of office was from January 3, 2020, to January 3, 2022. In January 2021, Choi was served as vice-chairman of the Korean Film Council (KOFIC). Kim Young-jin, a professor at Myongji University's Department of Arts, was chosen as the chairman. The appointment was held on the afternoon of January 12, 2021, in a committee meeting to elect new leadership.

In November 2021, Ulsan announced that it had appointed Choi Jae-won as honorary executive chairman of the 1st Ulsan International Film Festival. Choi Jae-won was also selected as the honorary executive chairman of the Pre-Festival last year.

Choi served as feature film judge member of The 49th Seoul Independent Film Festival 2023. It was opened at CGV Apgujeong on November 30, 2023.

== Personal life ==
Choi is married with children, including a daughter born in 1995 and a son. Choi and his wife are devoted to their Buddhist faith. Monk Gwangje, the eldest Theravada of Baegyangsa, bestowed upon Choi the Dharma name "Hwaôm" (華嚴).

During a difficult period in Choi's life, his wife guided him towards Hadong Ssanggyesa. Having achieved substantial success in the securities industry and established his own investment company, Choi had attained considerable wealth. However, unforeseen circumstances led to a sudden downfall, resulting in his bankruptcy. Prior to this challenging period, Choi was raised in a non-devout Buddhist family, only visiting the temple on events like Buddha's Birthday.

Since 2004, Choi has made a weekly pilgrimage to Hadong Ssanggyesa and receiving teachings from Monk Eunbong, the superior of Monk Gwangje. This dedicated routine has been ongoing for a decade, with exceptions made only for overseas business trips and times of mourning for his mother. Additionally, Choi incorporates meditation into his spiritual practices on a regular basis.

== Filmography ==
=== Film ===
Filmmaking credit
Year	Title		Director	Production House	Credited as			Ref.
Year	English	Korean	Director	Production House	Investor	Planner	Producer	Ref.
2000	Barking Dogs Never Bite	플란다스의 개	Bong Joon-ho	Cinema Service	Joint-investment	—N/a		
2000	Plum Blossom	청춘	Kwak Ji-kyoon	Eye Pictures; Won Film	Joint-investment	—N/a		
2000	Bichunmoo	비천무	Kim Young-jun	Taewon Entertainment	Joint-investment	—N/a		
2001	I Wish I Had a Wife	나도 아내가 있었으면 좋겠다	Park Heung-sik	Sidus Pictures Co., Ltd.	Joint-investment	—N/a		
2001	Musa	무사	Kim Sung-su	Sidus Pictures Co., Ltd.	Joint-investment	—N/a		
2001	Indian Summer	인디안 썸머	Noh Hyo-jeong	Cinema Service	Joint-investment	—N/a		
2001	Summer Time	썸머타임	Park Jae-ho	Sidus Pictures Co., Ltd.	Joint-investment	—N/a		
2001	Wanee & Junah	와니와 준하	Kim Yong-gyun	Youth Film	Joint-investment	—N/a		
2002	My Beautiful Girl, Mari	마리이야기	Lee Sung-gang	Daewoo Entertainment; Kuk Dong; Siz Entertainment	Joint-investment	—N/a		
2002	Marriage Is a Crazy Thing	결혼은 미친 짓이다	Yoo Ha	Cinema Service	Joint-investment	—N/a		
2002	Road Movie	로드무비	Kim In-sik	Sidus Pictures Co., Ltd.	Joint-investment	—N/a		
2002	The Coast Guard	해안선	Kim Ki-duk	LJ Film	Joint-investment	—N/a		
2003	Madeleine	마들렌	Park Kwang-chun	Free Cinema	Joint-investment	—N/a		
2003	Memories of Murder	살인의 추억	Bong Joon-ho	Sidus Pictures Co., Ltd. CJ Entertainment	Joint-investment	—N/a		
2003	A Tale of Two Sisters	장화, 홍련	Kim Jee-woon	iPictures	Yes	—N/a		
2003	Spring, Summer, Fall, Winter... and Spring	봄 여름 가을 겨울 그리고 봄	Kim Ki-duk	LJ Film	Joint-investment	—N/a		
2004	Dance with Solitude	고독이 몸부림칠 때	Lee Su-in	Magic Flute	Yes	—N/a		
2004	Flying Boys	발레교습소	Byun Young-joo	Good Movie	Joint-investment	—N/a		
2004	The Wolf Returns	마지막 늑대	Jahong Koo	Genesis Pictures Co., Ltd.	Yes	—N/a		
2004	The President's Barber	효자동 이발사	Im Chan-sang	Showbox	Joint-investment	—N/a		
2007	Hansel and Gretel	헨젤과 그레텔	Yim Pil-sung	Barunson; CJ Entertainment	Joint-investment	—N/a	Co-producer	
2008	The Good, the Bad, the Weird	좋은 놈, 나쁜 놈, 이상한 놈	Kim Jee-woon	Barunson; CJ Entertainment	Joint-investment	—N/a	Co-producer	
2009	Mother	마더	Bong Joon-ho	Barunson; Grimm Pictures; CJ Entertainment	—N/a	—N/a	Co-producer	
2009	Girl Friends	걸프렌즈	Kang Seok-beom	Next Entertainment World	Joint-investment	—N/a	—N/a	
2009	Fortune Salon	청담보살	Kim Jin-young	Next Entertainment World	Joint-investment	—N/a	—N/a	
2009	Audition	오디션	Min Kyung-jo	Film	Joint-investment	—N/a	—N/a	
2009	Lifting King Kong	킹콩을 들다	Park Gun-yong	RG Entertainment; CL Entertainment; Next Entertainment World	Joint-investment	—N/a	—N/a	
2010	Man of Vendetta	파괴된 사나이	Woo Min-ho	iFilm; I Love Cinema	—N/a		Co-producer	
2011	Hindsight	푸른소금	Lee Hyun-seung	Studio Blue	—N/a		Yes	
2011	Detective K: Secret of the Virtuous Widow	광대들: 풍문조작단	Kim Ju-ho	withUS Film	Yes	—N/a	—N/a	
2012	Behind the Camera	뒷담화: 감독이 미쳤어요	E J-yong	withUS Film	—N/a	—N/a	Yes	
2013	The Attorney	변호인	Yang Woo-suk	withUS Film	Yes			
2015	The Magician	조선마술사	Kim Dae-seung	withUS Film	Yes			
2016	The Age of Shadows	밀정	Kim Jee-woon	Grimm Pictures; Warner Bros. Korea; Harbin Films	Yes	—N/a	Yes	
2017	Bluebeard	해빙	Lee Soo-Yeon	withUS Film; Bull Pictures Inc	—N/a	—N/a	Yes	
2017	A Special Lady	미옥	Lee An-gyu	Kidari Entertainment	—N/a	Yes	—N/a	
2017	A Single Rider	싱글라이더	Lee Joo-young	Perfect Storm Films; Warner Bros. Korea	Yes	—N/a	Yes	
2017	V.I.P.	브이아이피	Park Hoon-jung	Peppermint & Company; Warner Bros. Korea	Yes	—N/a	—N/a	
2018	Champion	챔피언	Kim Yong-wan	Coco Corner; Warner Bros. Korea	Yes	—N/a	Yes	
2018	Illang: The Wolf Brigade	인랑	Kim Jee-woon	Lewis Pictures; Warner Bros. Korea	Yes	—N/a	Yes	
2018	The Witch: Part 1. The Subversion	마녀	Park Hoon-jung	Gold Moon Film Production; Warner Bros. Korea	Yes	—N/a	—N/a	
2018	Miss Baek	미쓰백	Lee Ji-won	Bae Pictures	—N/a	—N/a	Yes	
2018	Dino King 3D: Journey to Fire Mountain	점박이 한반도의 공룡2 : 새로운 낙원	Han Sang-ho	Pictures	Joint-investment	—N/a	—N/a	
2019	Jo Pil-ho: The Dawning Rage	악질경찰	Lee Jung-beom	Dice Film; Generation Blue Films	—N/a	—N/a	Yes	
2019	Bring Me Home	나를 찾아줘	Kim Seung-woo	26 Company	Yes	—N/a	—N/a	
2019	Jesters: The Game Changers	광대들: 풍문조작단	Kim Joo-ho Film History Simplex	Film History Simplex; Warner Bros.	Joint-investment	—N/a	—N/a	
2019	Battle of Jangsari	장사리: 잊혀진 영웅들	Kwak Kyung-taek; Kim Tae-hoon	Taewon Entertainment; Film 295; Finecut; Warner Bros.	Joint-investment	—N/a	—N/a	
2019	The Day I Died: Unclosed Case	내가 죽던 날	Park Ji-wan	Oscar 10 Studio; Story Pong; Warner Bros. Korea	Yes	—N/a	—N/a	
2020	Best Friend	이웃사촌	Lee Hwan-kyung	Cinemahub; Fantasy Entertainment	Joint-investment	—N/a	—N/a	
2020	Josée	조제	Kim Jong-kwan	Ball Media; Warner Bros. Korea	Yes	—N/a	—N/a	
2023	Killing Romance	킬링 로맨스	Lee Won-suk	Warner Bros. Korea	Yes	—N/a	—N/a	
2023	Cobweb	거미집	Kim Jee-woon	Anthology Studio; Barunson Studio; Luz Y Sonidos	Yes	—N/a	Yes	
TBA	Drishyam		Kim Jee-woon	Anthology Studio; Panorama	Yes	—N/a	—N/a	
TBA	Offering	오퍼링스	Anthony Shim	Anthology Studio; Anonymous Content	Yes	—N/a	—N/a	
TBA	D1		TBA	Anthology Studio; Studio Wiip				
TBA	The Hole	더홀	Kim Jee-woon	Anthology Studio				

=== Web series ===
Web series credits
Year	Title		Director	Planner	Production House	Ref.
Year	English	Korean	Director	Planner	Production House	Ref.
2026	Unfriend	언프렌드	Kim Jee-woon; Park Bo-ram	Choi Jae-won; Syd Lim	Anthology Studio; Yong Film; SK Global	

== Accolades ==
=== Award and nomination ===
Award	Year	Category	Recipient	Result	Ref.
14th Director's Cut Awards	2014	Best Producer	The Attorney (Choi Jae-won)	Won	
16th Udine Far East Film Festival	2014	Black Dragon Audience Award	The Attorney (Note: Award shared with Kim Woo-taek)	Won	
16th Udine Far East Film Festival	2014	First Runner-up, Golden Mulberry Award	The Attorney	Won	
50th Baeksang Arts Awards	2014	Best Film	The Attorney	Won	
23rd Buil Film Awards	2014	Best Film	The Attorney	Nominated	
23rd Buil Film Awards	2014	Buil Reader's Jury Award	The Attorney	Won	
35th Blue Dragon Film Awards	2014	Best Film	The Attorney	Won	
51st Grand Bell Awards	2014	Best Film	The Attorney	Nominated	
Max Movie Award	2014	Best Film	The Attorney	Nominated	
36th Korean Association of Film Critics Awards	2016	Best Film	The Age of Shadows	Won	
37th Blue Dragon Film Awards	2016	Best Film	The Age of Shadows	Nominated	
53rd Grand Bell Awards	2016	Best Film	The Age of Shadows	Nominated	
11th Asian Film Awards	2017	Best Film	The Age of Shadows	Nominated	
53rd Baeksang Arts Awards	2017	Best Film	The Age of Shadows	Nominated	
Seondeok High School Alumni Association	2017	Proud Seondeok Person of 2017	Choi Jae-won	Won	

=== Listicle ===
Name of publisher, year listed, name of listicle, and placement
Publisher	Year	List	Placement	Ref.
Cine21	2007	Chungmuro 50 Power Filmmaker	38th	
