= Kwak Do-won =

South Korean actor

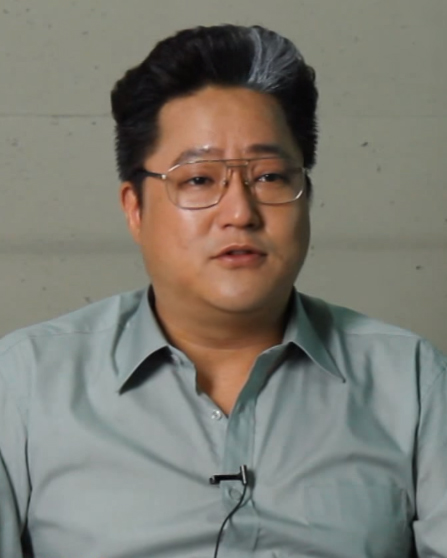
- Kwak in 2014
- Born: Kwak Byung-kyu; May 17, 1973 (age 53); Gwangjin-gu, Seoul, South Korea
- Occupation: Actor
- Years active: 1992–present
- Agent: Mada Entertainment

Korean name
- Hangul: 곽병규
- RR: Gwak Byeonggyu
- MR: Kwak Pyŏnggyu

Stage name
- Hangul: 곽도원
- RR: Gwak Dowon
- MR: Kwak Towŏn

Kwak Do-won (born Kwak Byung-kyu on May 17, 1973) is a South Korean actor. He first gained recognition in supporting roles in the films The Yellow Sea (2010) and Nameless Gangster: Rules of the Time (2012). Kwak is known for starring in The Attorney (2013), Tazza: The Hidden Card (2014), The Wailing (2016), Asura: The City of Madness (2016), Steel Rain (2017), and The Man Standing Next (2020).

== Career ==
Kwak is known for his roles in the films The Yellow Sea (2010), Nameless Gangster: Rules of the Time (2012), The Attorney (2013), The Wailing (2016), Asura: The City of Madness (2016), Steel Rain (2017) and the television series Phantom (2012).

In May 2019, Kwak signed with new agency Mada Entertainment. Later in July 2022, Kwak renewed his contract with Mada Entertainment.

== Personal life ==
On April 20, 2005, he mentioned on Knowing Bros that he was late for theater practice because of the Seoul Children's Grand Park elephants escape case.

== Filmography ==
=== Film ===
Year	Title	Role	Notes/Ref.
2003	If You Were Me	Yeokdobu director	
2003	Ogu	Byung-gu	
2007	The Obese Family	Son-in-law Kwok	short film
2007	Passionate People	Broadcasting PD	short film
2008	The Good, the Bad, the Weird	Gangster at traditional market	
2009	The Great Player	Lee Dong-shik	short film
2009	Jin-Wie	Jin-wie	
2009	Handphone	Lead detective	
2009	Sisters on the Road	Truck driver 1 / Radio DJ (voice)	
2009	Mother	Charcoal fire man	
2009	Too Fragile to Be Loved	President Kim	short film
2010	The Man From Nowhere	Detective Kim	
2010	Midnight FM	Reporter Jang	
2010	Hero	PE teacher	
2010	심장이 필요한 남자	Detective Park	
2010	The Yellow Sea	Prof. Kim Seung-hyun	
2011	Head	Jung seonbae	
2011	Double Clutch		short film
2012	Nameless Gangster: Rules of the Time	Jo Beom-seok	
2012	Love Fiction	Director Hwang	
2012	The Fantastic Duo	Deok-gyu	short film
2012	Ghost Sweepers	Monk Shim-in	
2012	A Company Man	Kwon Jong-tae	
2013	The Berlin File	Chung Wa-dae	
2013	An Ethics Lesson	Soo-taek	
2013	The Great Player		short film
2013	The Attorney	Cha Dong-young	
2014	Man in Love	Young-il	
2014	Mad Sad Bad		segment "Ghost"
2014	Tazza: The Hidden Card	Jang Dong-sik	
2015	The Shameless	Moon Ki-beom	
2015	The Magician	Gwi-mol	
2016	The Wailing	Jong-gu	
2016	Asura: The City of Madness	Kim Cha-in	
2017	The Mayor	Shim Hyeok-soo	
2017	Steel Rain	Kwak Chul-woo	
2020	Steel Rain 2: Summit	Park Jin-woo, North Korean Supreme Guard Command Chief	
2020	The Man Standing Next	Kim Hyong-uk	
2020	The Golden Holiday		
2021	CCTV		
2024	The Firefighters	Jeong Jin-seop	

=== Television ===
Year	Title	Role
2008	Discovery of the Speech: Good Years	
2009	Strange Stories and Legends: The Third Story	Jung Yoon-seok
2010	Mister M	Ha-na's father
2011	My Mom Audrey	Ki-tae
2012	Phantom	Kwon Hyuk-joo
2013	Good Doctor	Kang Hyun-tae
2013	The Suspicious Housekeeper	Park Bok-nyeo's late husband (cameo)
2022	Never Give Up	Gu Pil-soo

=== Web series ===
Year	Title	Role	Ref.
2025	Villains	Jang Joong-hyuk	

== Theater ==
Year	Title	Role
1999	King David	Israel's soldier
2001	Hamlet	
2001	Rural Scholar Jo Nam-myung	
2003	Samyeong Daesa	Tokugawa Ieyasu
2003	Citizens of Seoul 1919	
2003	Deceived by Money, Despaired by Love	Kwang-ho byeonsa
2003	이랑 나비되어	Joo-ki
2004	The Wandering Troupe	
2004	울 밑에선 봉선이야	
2004	King Lear	Edgar
2005	Cain	Gwang-dae
2006	The Dummy Bride	Police substation head
2006	Beautiful Men	Kim Kyung-son
2007	Edward Bond's Lear	Tom, the Duke of North

== Accolades ==
=== Awards and nominations ===
Year	Award	Category	Nominated work	Result
2012	21st Buil Film Awards	Best Supporting Actor	Nameless Gangster: Rules of the Time	Nominated
2012	33rd Blue Dragon Film Awards	Best Supporting Actor	Nameless Gangster: Rules of the Time	Nominated
2012	5th Korea Drama Awards	Excellence Award, Actor	Phantom	Won
2012	20th SBS Drama Awards	Special Acting Award, Actor in a Drama Special	Phantom	Won
2014	9th Max Movie Awards	Best Supporting Actor	The Attorney	Won
2014	50th Baeksang Arts Awards	Best Supporting Actor (Film)	The Attorney	Nominated
2014	23rd Buil Film Awards	Best Supporting Actor	The Attorney	Won
2014	34th Korean Association of Film Critics Awards	Best Supporting Actor	The Attorney	Won
2014	51st Grand Bell Awards	Best Supporting Actor	The Attorney	Nominated
2014	35th Blue Dragon Film Awards	Best Supporting Actor	The Attorney	Nominated
2016	25th Buil Film Awards	Best Actor	The Wailing	Nominated
2016	37th Blue Dragon Film Awards	Best Actor	The Wailing	Nominated
2016	53rd Grand Bell Awards	Best Actor	The Wailing	Nominated
2016	The Korea Film Actors Association	Korea's Top Star	The Wailing	Won
2016	BloodGuts UK Horror Awards	Best Actor in an International Film	The Wailing	Won
2017	53rd Baeksang Arts Awards	Best Actor (Film)	The Wailing	Nominated
2017	22nd Chunsa Film Art Awards	Best Actor	The Wailing	Nominated
2017	37th Golden Cinema Festival	Grand Prize (Daesang)	The Wailing	Won
2017	54th Grand Bell Awards	Best Supporting Actor	The Mayor	Nominated

=== Listicles ===
Name of publisher, year listed, name of listicle, and placement
Publisher	Year	Listicle	Rank	Ref.
The Screen	2019	2009–2019 Top Box Office Powerhouse Actors in Korean Movies	31st	
