= 50th Baeksang Arts Awards =

2014 edition of award ceremony

- Title card
- Date: May 27, 2014
- Site: Grand Peace Hall, Kyung Hee University, Seoul
- Hosted by: Shin Dong-yup; Kim Ah-joong
- Organised by: Ilgan Sports

Highlights
- Most awards: Film: The Attorney (3); Television: My Love from the Star (3)
- Most nominations: Film: The Attorney (7); Television: Reply 1994 (9) (Note: Nominations for "Most Popular Actor" and "Most Popular Actress" not counted.)
- Grand Prize – Film: Song Kang-ho (actor) – The Attorney
- Grand Prize – TV: Jun Ji-hyun (actress) – My Love from the Star
- Website: http://www.baeksangawards.co.kr/

Television/radio coverage
- Network: JTBC

The 50th Baeksang Arts Awards (Korean: 제50회 백상예술대상) ceremony, organised by Ilgan Sports, took place on May 27, 2014, at Grand Peace Hall, Kyung Hee University, Seoul, beginning at 6:20 p.m. KST. The ceremony was televised live in South Korea by JTBC and was hosted by Shin Dong-yup and Kim Ah-joong.

The nominations were announced on April 27, 2014, through the official website. The Attorney led the film-related categories with seven nominations and Reply 1994 led the television-related categories with nine nominations. The highest honors of the night, Grand Prize (Daesang), were awarded to actor Song Kang-ho of The Attorney in the film division and actress Jun Ji-hyun of My Love from the Star in the television division. The Attorney and My Love from the Star were the most winning work at the ceremony with three awards each. Kim Soo-hyun was the most awarded individual of the night; he won Best New Actor – Film and Most Popular Actor – Film for Secretly, Greatly and Most Popular Actor – Television for My Love from the Star.

== Winners and nominees ==
- Winners are listed first, highlighted in **boldface**.
  - Nominees

=== Film ===
**Grand Prize**
**Song Kang-ho (actor) – The Attorney**
**Best Film**	**Best Director**
**The Attorney**; The Face Reader; Hope; Snowpiercer; The Terror Live	**Bong Joon-ho – Snowpiercer**; Hong Sang-soo – Our Sunhi; Cho Ui-seok, Kim Byeong-seo – Cold Eyes; Kim Byung-woo – The Terror Live; Lee Joon-ik – Hope
**Best New Director**	**Best Screenplay**
**Yang Woo-suk – The Attorney**; Ha Jung-woo – Fasten Your Seatbelt; Huh Jung – Hide and Seek; Lee Jong-pil – Born to Sing; Um Tae-hwa – Ingtoogi: The Battle of Internet Trolls	**Kim Ji-hye, Jo Joong-hoon – Hope**; Huh Jung – Hide and Seek; Kim Byung-woo – The Terror Live; Shin Dong-ik, Hong Yun-jeong, Dong Hee-seon – Miss Granny; Yang Woo-suk, Yoon Hyun-ho – The Attorney
**Best Actor**	**Best Actress**
**Sul Kyung-gu – Hope as Im Dong-hoon**; Ha Jung-woo – The Terror Live as Yoon Young-hwa; Jung Woo-sung – Cold Eyes as James; Son Hyun-joo – Hide and Seek as Sung-soo; Song Kang-ho – The Attorney as Song Woo-seok	**Shim Eun-kyung – Miss Granny as Oh Doo-ri**; Jeon Do-yeon – Way Back Home as Song Jeong-yeon; Kim Hee-ae – Thread of Lies as Hyun-sook; Moon Jeong-hee – Hide and Seek as Joo-hee; Uhm Ji-won – Hope as Kim Mi-hee
**Best Supporting Actor**	**Best Supporting Actress**
**Lee Jung-jae – The Face Reader as Grand Prince Suyang**; Jo Sung-ha – The Suspect as Kim Seok-ho; Kim Eui-sung – The Face Reader as Han Myeong-hoe; Kwak Do-won – The Attorney as Cha Dong-young; Lee Geung-young – Venus Talk as Seong-jae	**Jin Kyung – Cold Eyes as Department head Lee**; Go Ah-sung – Snowpiercer as Yona; Kim Young-ae – The Attorney as Choi Soon-ae; Ra Mi-ran – Hope as Young-seok's mother; Ye Ji-won – Our Sunhi as Joo-hyun
**Best New Actor**	**Best New Actress**
**Kim Soo-hyun – Secretly, Greatly as Won Ryu-hwan / Bang Dong-gu**; Kim Woo-bin – Friend: The Great Legacy as Choi Sung-hoon; Lee Joon – Rough Play as Oh Young; Yeo Jin-goo – Hwayi: A Monster Boy as Hwa-yi; Im Si-wan – The Attorney as Park Jin-woo	**Kim Hyang-gi – Thread of Lies as Cheon-ji**; Lee Jae-hye – The Russian Novel as Jae-hye; Lee Re – Hope as Im So-won; Park Ji-soo – Mai Ratima as Mai Ratima; Sun Joo-ah – Pluto as Kang Mi-ra
**Most Popular Actor**	**Most Popular Actress**
**Kim Soo-hyun – Secretly, Greatly as Won Ryu-hwan / Bang Dong-gu**	**Kwon Yu-ri – No Breathing as Jung-eun**

=== Television ===
**Grand Prize**	**Best Drama**
**Jun Ji-hyun (actress) – My Love from the Star**	**Good Doctor (KBS)**; I Can Hear Your Voice (SBS); My Love from the Star (SBS); Reply 1994 (tvN); Secret Love Affair (JTBC)
**Best Entertainment Program**	**Best Educational Show**
**Grandpas Over Flowers (tvN)**; Hidden Singer (JTBC); Immortal Songs (KBS); Real Man (MBC); The Return of Superman (KBS)	**Unanswered Questions (SBS)**; Food X-Files (Channel A); Physics of Light (EBS); Parent vs. Student's Parent (SBS); Battle of Tongues (JTBC)
**Best Director**	**Best Screenplay**
**Ahn Pan-seok – Secret Affair**; Jang Tae-yoo – My Love from the Star; Jo Soo-won – I Can Hear Your Voice; Ki Min-soo – Good Doctor; Shin Won-ho – Reply 1994	**Jung Sung-joo – Secret Affair**; Ha Myung-hee – One Warm Word; Park Ji-eun – My Love from the Star; Kim Ji-woo – Don't Look Back: The Legend of Orpheus; Lee Woo-jung – Reply 1994
**Best Actor**	**Best Actress**
**Cho Jae-hyun – Jeong Do-jeon as Jeong Do-jeon**; Joo Won – Good Doctor as Park Shi-on; Kim Soo-hyun – My Love from the Star as Do Min-joon; Lee Jong-suk – I Can Hear Your Voice as Park Soo-ha; Yoo Ah-in – Secret Love Affair as Lee Sun-jae	**Lee Bo-young – I Can Hear Your Voice as Jang Hye-sung**; Go Ara – Reply 1994 as Sung Na-jung; Jun Ji-hyun – My Love from the Star as Cheon Song-yi; Kim Hye-soo – The Queen of Office as Miss Kim; Kim Ji-soo – One Warm Word as Song Mi-kyung
**Best New Actor**	**Best New Actress**
**Jung Woo – Reply 1994 as "Sseureki" (Trash)**; Baro – God's Gift: 14 Days as Ki Young-kyu; Choi Jin-hyuk – Gu Family Book as Gu Wol-ryung; Kim Sung-kyun – Reply 1994 as "Samcheonpo"; Park Seo-joon – One Warm Word as Song Min-soo	**Baek Jin-hee – Empress Ki as Danashri**; Han Groo – One Warm Word as Na Eun-young; Kyung Soo-jin – Eunhui as Kim Eun-hee; Min Do-hee – Reply 1994 as Jo Yoon-jin; Son Yeo-eun – Thrice Married Woman as Han Chae-rin
**Best Male Variety Performer**	**Best Female Variety Performer**
**Shin Dong-yup – Witch Hunt**; Kim Gu-ra – Radio Star; Kim Sung-joo – Dad! Where Are We Going?; You Hee-yeol – Saturday Night Live Korea; Jun Hyun-moo – Hidden Singer	**Kim Young-hee – Gag Concert**; Kim Ji-min – Gag Concert; Park Mi-sun – Quiz to Change the World; Park Ji-yoon – Gourmet Road; Lee Young-ja – Hello Counselor
**Most Popular Actor**	**Most Popular Actress**
**Kim Soo-hyun – My Love from the Star as Do Min-joon**	**Park Shin-hye – The Heirs as Cha Eun-sang**
**Best Original Soundtrack**
**Lyn – "My Destiny" – My Love from the Star**; Ailee – "Tears Stole the Heart" – Secret Love; Lee Changmin – "Moment" – The Heirs; Roy Kim – "Seoul, Here" – Reply 1994; Sung Si-kyung – "To You" – Reply 1994

=== Special awards ===
Awards	Recipient
**Fashionista Award**	Im Si-wan, Kim Hee-ae
**InStyle Fashion Award**	Jun Ji-hyun

== Performers ==
Performers listed in the order of appearance.

Name(s)	Role	Performed
Exo-K (Suho, Baekhyun, Chanyeol, D.O., Kai and Sehun)	Performers	"Overdose"
Lyn	Performer	"My Destiny" from My Love from the Star

== Gallery ==
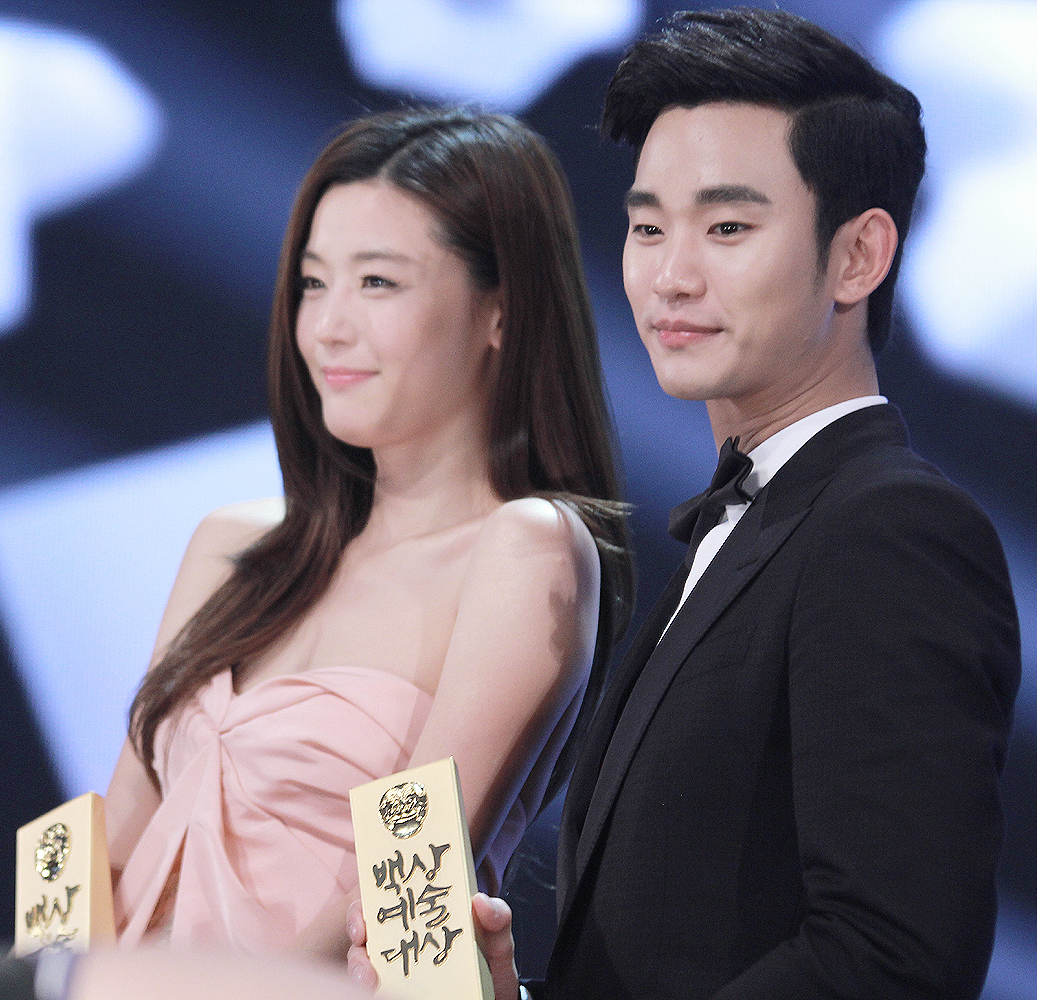
Jun Ji-hyun & Kim Soo-hyun

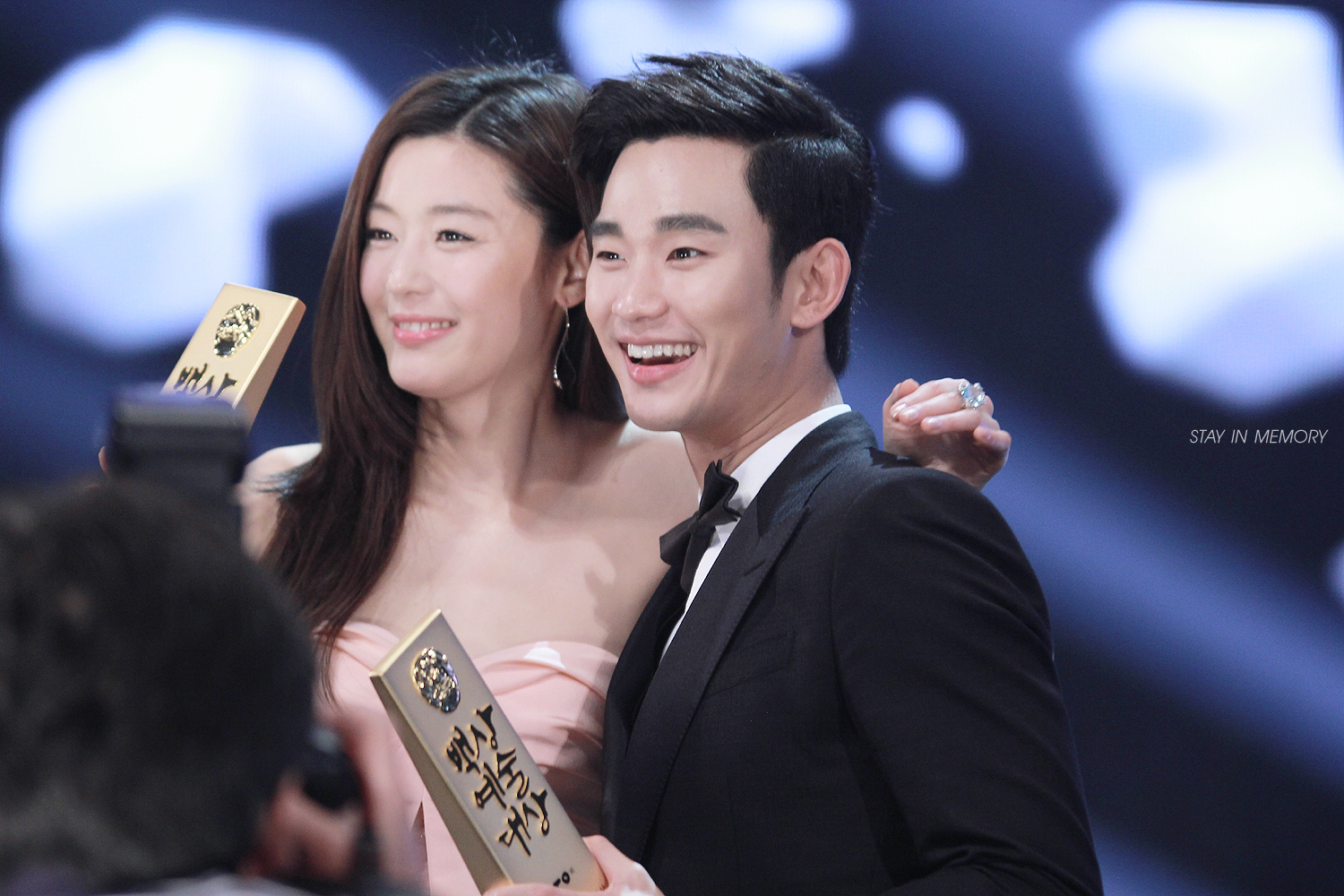
Jun Ji-hyun & Kim Soo-hyun

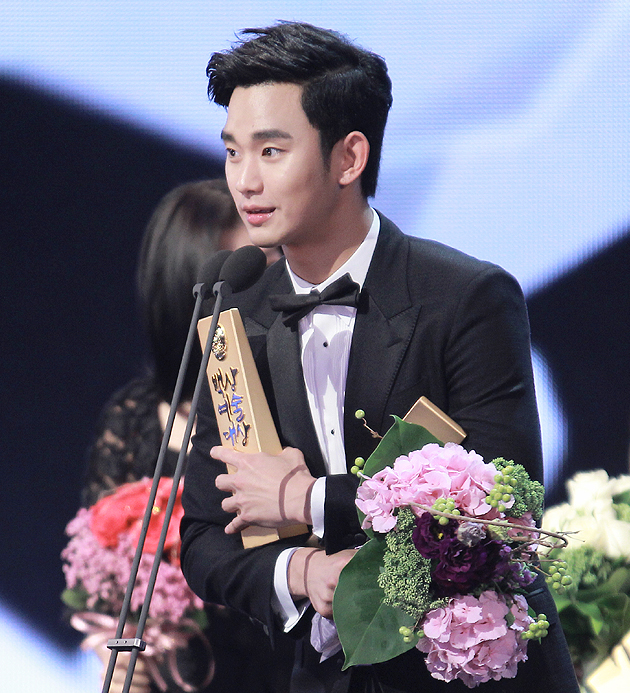
Kim Soo-hyun after winning an award

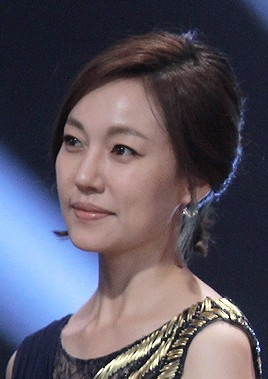
Jin Kyung, Best Supporting Actress

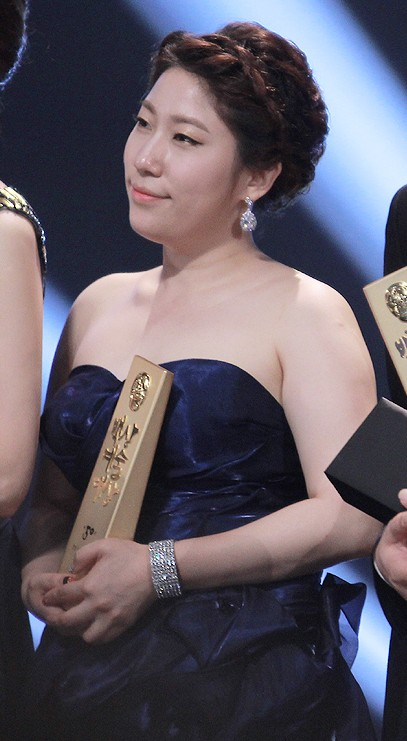
Kim Young-hee, Best Female Variety Performer

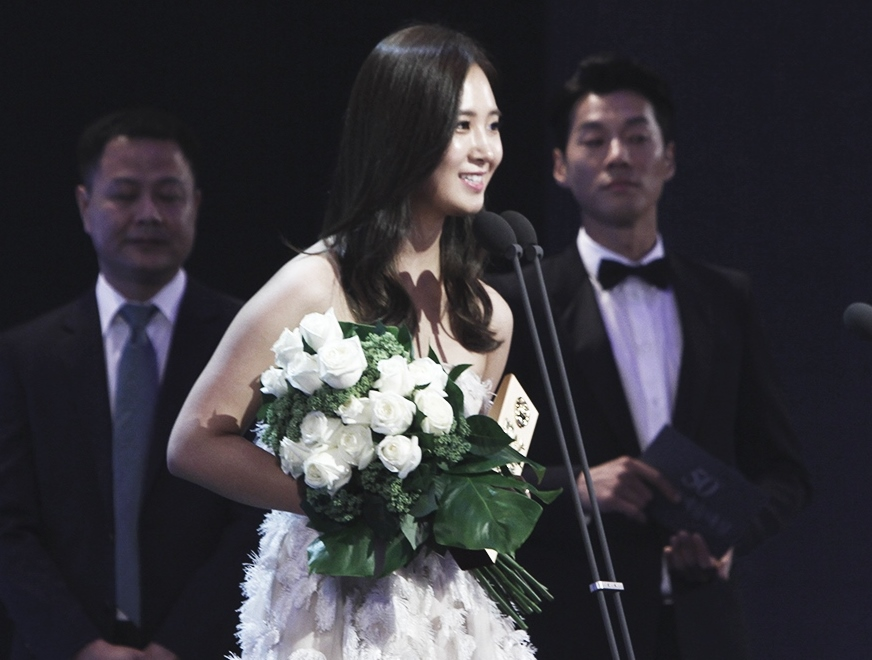
Kwon Yu-ri after winning Most Popular Actress
