= Yang Woo-suk =

South Korean film director and manhwaga (born 1969)

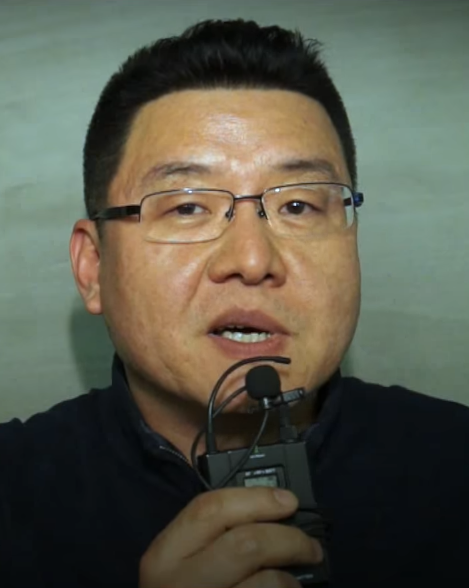
- Yang in 2016
- Born: October 24, 1969 (age 57); Seoul, South Korea
- Education: Korea University
- Occupations: Scriptwriter; Film director; Film producer; Cartoonist

Korean name
- Hangul: 양우석
- Hanja: 楊宇碩
- RR: Yang Useok
- MR: Yang Usŏk

Yang Woo-suk (born October 24, 1969) is a South Korean film scriptwriter, director, producer, and manhwaga. His first film was the critical and commercial hit The Attorney (2013).

== Career ==
Born in Seoul in 1969, Yang Woo-suk graduated from Korea University with degrees in English Literature and Philosophy. He became a cartoonist, writing webtoons such as If Thou Must Love Me (2008–2009) and Steel Rain (2011–2012).

Yang also began working in the film industry mainly as a producer for the companies MBC Productions, SK Independence, and All That Story, doing such tasks as production planning, investment supervision and recruiting new directors. He became interested in film technology and taught himself about HD and CGI; he produced the HD film Desire in 2004 and became the creative planning director at computer graphics company Locus.

Yang's debut as a filmmaker came relatively late in life in his mid-forties, when he co-wrote and directed courtroom drama The Attorney, a fictionalized account of former South Korean president Roh Moo-hyun's early years as a human rights lawyer in 1980s Busan. It was loosely based on the "Burim" case of 1981, when the Chun Doo-hwan regime arrested without warrants 22 students and teachers who belonged to a book-reading club on charges that they were North Korea sympathizers. Yang said, "I am interested in films that tell stories of people who struggle hard to stick to their beliefs when they come into conflict with outside environments. [...] I wanted to grasp the very moment when a man dramatically and radically changed." At first Yang had difficulty getting funding for a film with real-life historical figures given the sensitive political climate, but those pre-production budgetary woes eased when top actor Song Kang-ho was cast as the protagonist. Released in late 2013, The Attorney became an unexpected box office sensation, drawing 11,375,954 admissions as it reminded older viewers of the country's politically charged past and provided younger viewers with a window into that era. It became the ninth film in Korean cinema history to reach 10 million admissions, and became (at the time) the 8th highest grossing Korean film of all time. The Attorney received multiple awards and nominations domestically, particularly for Song who received rave reviews for his performance. Notably, it won four awards at the 35th Blue Dragon Film Awards, including Best Film, Best Actor for Song, Best Supporting Actress for Kim Young-ae, and Popular Star Award for Yim Si-wan. Yang also won several Best New Director prizes, from the 19th Chunsa Film Art Awards, the 50th Baeksang Arts Awards (where Song won the Grand Prize and The Attorney won Best Film), the 14th Director's Cut Awards, the 34th Korean Association of Film Critics Awards, and the 51st Grand Bell Awards (where Yang also won Best Screenplay).

== Filmography ==
Film credits
Year	Title		Credited as			Ref.
Year	English	Korean	Director	Writer	Producer	Ref.
2004	Desire		No	No	Yes	
2013	The Attorney	변호인	Yes	Yes	No	
2017	Steel Rain	강철비	Yes	Yes	No	
2020	Steel Rain 2: Summit	강철비2: 정상회담	Yes	Yes	No	
2024	About Family	대가족	Yes	Yes	Yes	

== Webtoons ==
Film credits
Year	Title		Credited as		Notes
Year	English	Korean	Writer	Artist	Notes
2008–2009	If Thou Must Love Me	당신이 날 사랑해야 한다면	Yes	Yes	
2009	Robot Taekwondo V	로보트 태권 V	Yes	Yes	
2011–2012	Steel Rain	스틸레인	Yes	Yes	

== Awards and nominations ==
Year	Award	Category	Recipient	Result
2014	16th Udine Far East Film Festival	Black Dragon Audience Award	The Attorney	Won
2014	16th Udine Far East Film Festival	First Runner-up, Golden Mulberry Award	The Attorney	Won
2014	19th Chunsa Film Art Awards	Best New Director	The Attorney	Won
2014	50th Baeksang Arts Awards	Best Film	The Attorney	Won
2014	50th Baeksang Arts Awards	Best New Director	The Attorney	Won
2014	50th Baeksang Arts Awards	Best Screenplay (Note: with Yoon Hyeon-ho)	The Attorney	Nominated
2014	14th Director's Cut Awards	Best New Director	The Attorney	Won
2014	23rd Buil Film Awards	Best Film	The Attorney	Nominated
2014	23rd Buil Film Awards	Best Director	The Attorney	Nominated
2014	23rd Buil Film Awards	Best New Director	The Attorney	Nominated
2014	23rd Buil Film Awards	Best Screenplay	The Attorney	Nominated
2014	23rd Buil Film Awards	Buil Reader's Jury Award	The Attorney	Won
2014	34th Korean Association of Film Critics Awards	Best New Director	The Attorney	Won
2014	34th Korean Association of Film Critics Awards	Critics' Top 10	The Attorney	Won
2014	51st Grand Bell Awards	Best Film	The Attorney	Nominated
2014	51st Grand Bell Awards	Best New Director	The Attorney	Won
2014	51st Grand Bell Awards	Best Screenplay	The Attorney	Won
2014	35th Blue Dragon Film Awards	Best Film	The Attorney	Won
2014	35th Blue Dragon Film Awards	Best New Director	The Attorney	Nominated
2014	35th Blue Dragon Film Awards	Best Screenplay	The Attorney	Nominated
2017	54th Baeksang Arts Awards	Best Director	Steel Rain	Nominated
2017	38th Korean Association of Film Critics Awards	Top 11 Films	Steel Rain	Won
