= Steel Rain 2: Summit =

2020 South Korean action film

- Theatrical release poster
- Hangul: 강철비2: 정상회담
- Hanja: 鋼鐵비2: 頂上會談
- RR: Gangcheolbi2: jeongsanghoedam
- MR: Kangch'ŏlbi2: chŏngsanghoedam
- Directed by: Yang Woo-suk
- Screenplay by: Yang Woo-suk
- Based on: Steel Rain 3 by Yang Woo-suk
- Produced by: Lee Woo-jung; Choi Tae-young
- Starring: Jung Woo-sung; Kwak Do-won; Yoo Yeon-seok; Angus Macfadyen
- Cinematography: Kim Tae-sung
- Edited by: Kim Sang-bum
- Music by: Kim Tae-seong
- Production company: Studio Genius Woojeung
- Distributed by: Lotte Entertainment
- Release date: July 29, 2020
- Running time: 131 minutes
- Country: South Korea
- Languages: Korean; English
- Box office: US$11.1 million

Steel Rain 2: Summit (Korean: 강철비2: 정상회담; RR: Gangcheolbi2: jeongsanghoedam) is a 2020 South Korean action thriller film written and directed by Yang Woo-suk. It is a standalone sequel to the 2017 film Steel Rain. In the film, three leaders each from South Korea, North Korea, and the United States are kidnapped and held in a North Korean nuclear submarine during a summit between the two Koreas and the United States. It stars Jung Woo-sung as the South Korean president, Kwak Do-won as the North Korean Supreme Guard Command chief, Yoo Yeon-seok as the North Korean supreme leader and Angus Macfadyen as the United States president.

The film was theatrically released in South Korea on 29 July 2020.

== Plot ==
A secret meeting at sea takes place between Song Shikai, director of China's Ministry of State Security (MSS), and Shinzo Mori, director of the Yamato Foundation, an influential Japanese ultranationalist organization. Mori shows Song a plan called Operation Kagemusha, a US scheme to impose regime change on China through a false flag attack on a Japanese submarine at the disputed Senkaku Islands. However, Mori also shows Song an altered version of the plan that involves Dokdo instead, another island chain disputed between South Korea and Japan. Song is given a choice to choose one.

South Korea is invited by the U.S. to join the tripartite Senkaku naval exercises but President Han Kyeong-Jae declines the invitation. In a briefing, Han learns about a Coast Guard captain who had been lured into a honey trap and admitted that he was asked to attack a Japanese ship sailing around Dokdo. The U.S. State Department postpones a peace summit with North Korea over South Korea's refusal to participate in the exercise. Han reluctantly agrees, and learns about Yamato Foundation's funding by the Chinese government. Meanwhile in Japan, Shinzo Mori lays down a plot where Japan will pretend to engage in a war with China as per America's wishes, but instead will use this opportunity to regain lost territories in Korea.

Han proceeds to fly to Wonsan, where he meets North Korean supreme leader Jo Seon-sa and US President Smoot. Peace discussions falter over technicalities involving North Korea's nuclear program, even as Jo is willing to give them up in exchange for diplomatic relations. The Supreme Guard Command chief, Park Jin-woo, launches a coup to prevent the handover and holds the three leaders hostage in the Paektu, North Korea's first ballistic missile submarine. The US vice-president assumes command and attacks North Korea with a conventional ICBM. Onboard Paektu, Smoot is drugged and admits the truth of Operation Kagemusha. The information is passed on to the Chinese president, who demands an explanation from the US. Although denying it as a North Korean ploy, the US is forced to stand down and suspend further military action after Smoot is coerced to give the order.

Onboard Paektu, Park reveals further details of Operation Kagemusha; Japan had asked him to torpedo one of Japan's own patrol ships near Dokdo and fire an SLBM at South Korea to trigger a war for Japan to seize the islands. Park however, plans to fire the SLBM at Japan instead, effectively causing a massive regional conflict that will force China to enter this war on the side of its North Korean allies. Jang Ki-sok, the former head of the submarine command launches a mutiny that leaves many dead. Jang escorts the three leaders to a rescue sphere which allows space for only two. Han decides to stay, and helps the other two leaders escape.

President Smoot is rescued, and orders his cabinet and military not to involve the US in either of the Japanese plots, effectively leaving the Japanese to confront both Korea and China on their own in a potential conflict. Fearing international consequences, the Japanese government sends the JMSDF into the waters around Dokdo to hunt for the Paektu submarine to cover up Japan's ties to Park and the North Korean coup leaders. Jang and Park reach an uneasy truce, which begins to unravel as Park prioritises attacking Japan even as the submarine comes under attack by the JMSDF. In the ensuing conflict, President Han is shot non-fatally and Park is killed.

As a JMSDF submarine fires a final torpedo to destroy Paektu, Han leaves a final message for his country. However, the torpedo is countered by a torpedo fired by a group of South Korean Navy submarines that forces the remaining JMSDF vessels to retreat. The Paektu surfaces off Dokdo, and both Han and Jang look upon a sunrise. Following the failure of Operation Kagemusha, Shinzo Mori is killed on orders of the Japanese prime minister, and Smoot and Jo sign a peace treaty, officially ending the Korean War.

== Cast ==
- Jung Woo-sung as Han Kyeong-jae, South Korean president
- Kwak Do-won as Park Jin-woo, North Korean Supreme Guard Command chief
- Yoo Yeon-seok as Jo Seon-sa, the North Korean supreme leader
- Angus Macfadyen as Willis Chatman Smoot, the United States president
- Shin Jung-geun as Jang Ki-sok, the former head of North Korean submarine command
- Ryu Soo-young as Captain Baek Doo-ho
- Yum Jung-ah as the South Korean first lady
- Shin Soo-yeon as Han Young-hee
- Hakuryu as Shinzo Mori, Japanese billionaire and right wing activist
- Ahn Nae-sang is the South Korean minister of national defense
- Kim Yong-rim as the South Korean prime minister
- Jo Woo-jin as the South Korean submarine captain
- Go Yoon as Chief Han of the Presidential Protocol
- Choi Min-chul as North Korean General Guards officer #2
- Kim Myung-gon as the Chinese ambassador in Seoul
- Jang Gwang
- Kristen Dalton as the United States vice president
- Shim Hee-sub as a wire tapper

== Production ==
=== Development ===
"I personally believe the North Korean regime is more likely to collapse due to a military-led coup rather than nuclear weapons. However, South Korea is not really prepared for a crisis within North Korea ― a coup and a civil war among warring factions. Therefore, I wanted to offer a cinematic simulation on the future of the two Koreas."

— Yang Woo-suk during an interview with The Korea Times.

Writer and director Yang Woo-suk wanted to offer a cinematic simulation on the future of the two Koreas. According to him, the previous film showed the outbreak of war between the two Koreas, while this film shows a "more realistic approach to the situation on the Korean Peninsula that involves more than just the two countries." He also wanted to present the reality that the fate and stability of the Korean Peninsula are determined by other countries. He also explained the film's division into three parts: the historical background and international politics behind the conflict, some black comedy elements and the battle sequences between submarine and underwater missile attacks. He was worried that the long dialogues in the beginning could bore viewers, but also found them integral for explaining the complexity of inter-Korean relations.

He further described the power struggle inside the submarine as a metaphor for the inter-Korean conflict, further hinting a future sequel might be about families.

=== Casting ===
Yang Woo-suk cast the same actors but changed their roles, especially their sides. A few changes were made in the other cast members for China, Japan and USA. Yang deemed it a symbol of the current regional dynamics remaining the same even though South and North Korea change their approaches, since geopolitics in the region is decided by external factors.

Jung Woo-sung, who portrays the South Korean president, felt the film saw the Korean Peninsula from "a cool-headed point of view". He studied a lot about the history of inter-Korean summits and presidents, and had to imagine what the leaders thought of the future, the Korean Peninsula and how they led the summits. He described the film as an action thriller instead of a moral lecture. Yoo Yeon-seok, who portrays the North Korean leader, was initially reluctant to play the role as he couldn't imagine himself playing the role. He said the film featured geopolitical situations in a realistic way, but it being fictional allowed him to create his own character: a leader who felt great pressure to retain the regime against regional superpowers. Scottish actor Angus Macfadyen was chosen to play the United States president. He thought of his character as a vulgar and narcissistic man who thought of himself as always right and everyone else as wrong. Kwak Do-won, who plays the Supreme Guard Command, thought his character wasn't merely a villain. Given that North Korea has shown different attitudes towards South Korea in the real world, he tried to depict an aspect of North Korea that contrasts with Yoo's character.

=== Filming ===
The filming began on 27 August 2019. While filming on the sets, Yoo Yeon-seok felt "the psychological pressure of being in the dark, deep water." He further added that the restricted location helped in portraying the slightest changes in power relationship and emotions more sensitively.

== Release ==
Steel Rain 2: Summit was released in South Korean cinemas on 29 July 2020. On 9 August 2020, Jung Woo-sung went to Lotte Cinema at Lotte World Tower in Seoul, to greet fans in person at the ticket counter.

== Reception ==
Writing for HanCinema, William Schwartz felt the special effects spectacle overshadowed the film's early summit scenes that showcased real issues preventing peace talks. He also pointed out a number of scenes had no relation to the film's internal continuity. Choi Ji-won from The Korea Herald felt the character development was weak and found the characters "far too two-dimensional to be relatable." Davin Arul from The Star gave a 6.5/10 rating and felt the film sacrificed depth of story and characterization, describing it as "entertainment that skims the surface of its complicated topic, issues and players." Douglas Tseng from Today gave the film 3 stars out of 5, comparing it to an East Asian geopolitics lecture. The reviewer, however, praised Macfadyen's comic relief character and found the overall film "too believable", given the ongoing tensions in the South China Sea.

== Box office ==
The film debuted on the number one spot at the South Korean box office, attracting a million viewers in just five days of its release. Trade experts found the collections to be disappointing and lower than the original, but decent given the COVID-19 slowdown.
