= 23rd Buil Film Awards =

2014 edition of award ceremony

- Date: October 3, 2014
- Site: Haeundae Grand Hotel, Haeundae, Busan
- Hosted by: Kwon Yul; Ryu Hyun-kyung

The 23rd Buil Film Awards (Korean: 부일영화상) ceremony was hosted by the Busan-based daily newspaper Busan Ilbo. It was held on October 3, 2014 at the Haeundae Grand Hotel's Grand Ballroom in Busan and was emceed by actors Kwon Yul and Ryu Hyun-kyung.

== Nominations and winners ==
Complete list of nominees and winners:

(Winners denoted in bold)

Best Film	Best Director
**The Admiral: Roaring Currents**; The Attorney; Gyeongju; Han Gong-ju; Our Sunhi	**Hong Sang-soo** - **Our Sunhi**; Kim Han-min - The Admiral: Roaring Currents; Park Chan-kyong - Manshin: Ten Thousand Spirits; Yang Woo-suk - The Attorney; Zhang Lu - Gyeongju
Best Actor	Best Actress
**Song Kang-ho** - **The Attorney**; Choi Min-sik - The Admiral: Roaring Currents; Lee Sun-kyun - A Hard Day; Park Hae-il - Gyeongju; Son Hyun-joo - Hide and Seek	**Shim Eun-kyung** - **Miss Granny**; Bae Doona - A Girl at My Door; Chun Woo-hee - Han Gong-ju; Jeon Do-yeon - Way Back Home; Jung Yu-mi - Our Sunhi
Best Supporting Actor	Best Supporting Actress
**Kwak Do-won** - **The Attorney**; Baik Hyun-jhin - Gyeongju; Cho Jin-woong - A Hard Day; Lee Jung-jae - The Face Reader; Song Sae-byeok - A Girl at My Door	**Kim Young-ae** - **The Attorney**; Jo Yeo-jeong - Obsessed; Kim Sae-ron - A Girl at My Door; Kim Sung-ryung - The Target; Lee Jung-hyun - The Admiral: Roaring Currents; Yoon Ji-hye - Kundo: Age of the Rampant
Best New Actor	Best New Actress
**Lee Joo-seung** - **Shuttlecock**; Cho Dong-in - The Stone; Lee Joon - Rough Play; Yeo Jin-goo - Hwayi: A Monster Boy; Yim Si-wan - The Attorney	**Lim Ji-yeon** - **Obsessed**; Chun Woo-hee - Han Gong-ju; Kim Hyang-gi - Thread of Lies; Kong Ye-ji - Shuttlecock; Ryu Hye-young - INGtoogi: The Battle of Internet Trolls
Best New Director	Best Screenplay
**July Jung** - **A Girl at My Door**; Huh Jung - Hide and Seek; Kim Seong-hun - A Hard Day; Lee Su-jin - Han Gong-ju; Yang Woo-suk - The Attorney	**Shin Yeon-shick** - **The Russian Novel**; Kim Seong-hun - A Hard Day; Lee Su-jin - Han Gong-ju; Shin Dong-ik, Hong Yun-jeong, Dong Hee-seon - Miss Granny; Yang Woo-suk, Yoon Hyeon-ho - The Attorney; Yeon Sang-ho - The Fake
Best Cinematography	Best Art Direction
**Kim Tae-seong** - **The Admiral: Roaring Currents**; Cho Young-jik - Gyeongju; Choi Chan-min - Kundo: Age of the Rampant; Go Nak-seon - The Fatal Encounter; Lee Mo-gae - The Flu	**Jang Choon-seob** - **The Admiral: Roaring Currents**; Baek Gyeong-in - Manshin: Ten Thousand Spirits; Cho Hwa-sung - The Fatal Encounter; Lee Ha-jun - The Face Reader; Park Il-hyun - Kundo: Age of the Rampant
Best Music	Buil Readers' Jury Award
**Jo Yeong-wook** - **Kundo: Age of the Rampant**; Jo Yeong-wook - Hide and Seek; Kim Tae-seong - The Admiral: Roaring Currents; Mowg - The Fatal Encounter; Mowg - Miss Granny	**The Attorney**
Yu Hyun-mok Film Arts Award
**Kim Dong-won**
