= Steel Rain =

- Theatrical release poster
- Hangul: 강철비
- Hanja: 鋼鐵비
- RR: Gangcheolbi
- MR: Kangch'ŏlbi
- Directed by: Yang Woo-suk
- Screenplay by: Yang Woo-suk
- Based on: Steel Rain by Yang Woo-suk
- Produced by: Park Joon-ho; Kim Tae-won; Sun Young
- Starring: Jung Woo-sung; Kwak Do-won
- Cinematography: Lee Hyung-duk
- Edited by: Lee Gang-hee
- Music by: Kim Tae-seong
- Production companies: Mofac & Alfred
- Distributed by: Next Entertainment World; Netflix
- Release date: December 14, 2017
- Running time: 139 minutes
- Country: South Korea
- Languages: Korean; English; Japanese; Spanish
- Box office: US$32.8 million

Steel Rain (Korean: 강철비) is a 2017 South Korean action thriller film directed by Yang Woo-suk, based on his 2011 webtoon of the same name. The film stars Jung Woo-sung and Kwak Do-won.

The film opened in South Korea on December 14, 2017, and was later released worldwide on March 14, 2018, on Netflix. A standalone sequel titled Steel Rain 2: Summit was released in 2020, with Jung Woo-sung and Kwak Do-won returning to play the leading but different roles.

== Plot ==
In North Korea, Eom Chul-Woo is assigned by chief director Ri Tae-han of the Reconnaissance General Bureau to assassinate Supreme Guard Command chief Park Byung-jin and the minister of state security to prevent a coup d'état. Eom kills the minister in a car accident. In South Korea, senior presidential secretary Kwak Chul-woo congratulates Kim Kyung-young for winning the presidential election. He is later informed by Li, an ethnic Korean in charge of the Korean branch of China's state security, of the assassination and the possibility of a coup in the North.

Bidding farewell to his wife and daughter, Eom proceeds to the Kaesong Industrial Region, where Park is due to arrive with the supreme leader (Note: Referred to euphemistically as "Number One" throughout the film.) for a North Korean—Chinese event. Meanwhile, North Korean infiltrators disguised as ROK Army soldiers hijack a US Army MLRS vehicle and launch two missiles at Kaesong. Eom tries to inform Ri about Park's absence just as the missile lands.

Surviving the attack, Eom witnesses KPA soldiers massacring the remaining survivors. Eom and two schoolgirls rescue the gravely injured supreme leader in a toy company van and escape across the border to the South with the rest of the Chinese delegation. Kwak, meanwhile, meets with CIA station chief Joanne Martin, who absolves US responsibility for the incident.

In Ilsan, Eom has an obstetrician to tend the supreme leader, but she is unable to extract a bullet lodged near the supreme leader's brain. Meanwhile, Eom informs Ri of his location, who sends reinforcements to kill the supreme leader. Ri reveals himself to be the mastermind of the coup. Eom eliminates them and evacuates him to a plastic surgery clinic staffed by Kwak's ex-wife, Su-Hyeong. Notified of the fight, Kwak makes his way to his ex-wife's clinic and is tied up by Eom along with the South Koreans. However, South Korean special forces soon detain Eom, while the supreme leader is sent to be treated in a military hospital. Meanwhile, President Lee declares martial law in the country as North Korea declares war on the South.

The next morning, Eom and Kwak shadow the director of South Korea's National Intelligence Service as he meets with North Korean military leaders at Nodongdangsa. North Korean snipers attack the meeting and a car chase ensues. Not expecting Park to be leading the North Korean delegation, Eom shoots him as ordered earlier. Meanwhile, Ri reveals his plans to attack the South by using nuclear missiles but is unable to use them without the nuclear codes. Eom and Kwak foil another assassination attempt on the supreme leader. Tensions rise as the US Air Force launches nuclear missiles at North Korea, which responds by launching a nuclear missile toward Japan. The interception by a Japanese ship causes an electromagnetic pulse which takes down the US missiles. Alarmed by the escalation, Eom convinces Kwak to leak false news that the supreme leader is dead, which leads to the North halting its plans.

Eom forms a plan with Kwak and returns to the North via a secret tunnel to confront Ri in his underground bunker. The ROK Air Force receives Eom's signal to launch missiles at his location, destroying the bunker and killing everyone. With the coup attempt foiled, newly-inaugurated President Kim announces peace and reunification talks with North Korea. South Korean officials repatriate the supreme leader in return for half of North Korea's nuclear arsenal.

== Cast ==
- Jung Woo-sung as Eom Chul-woo, former North Korean special forces agent
- Kwak Do-won as Kwak Chul-woo, South Korean Senior Presidential Secretary for Foreign Affairs and National Security
- Kim Kap-soo as Ri Tae-han, head of the Reconnaissance General Bureau
- Kim Eui-sung as Lee Ee-seong, incumbent president of South Korea
- Lee Geung-young as Kim Kyung-young, president-elect of South Korea
- Jo Woo-jin as Choi Myung-rok, a skilled RGB agent loyal to Ri Tae-han
- Kim Myung-gon as Li Hong-jang/Mr. Li, the Chaoxianzu head of the Korean branch of Ministry of State Security of China
- Jung Won-joong as Park Byung-jin, head of the Supreme Guard Command
- Jang Hyun-sung as Jung Se-young, a senior member of the Blue House
- Lee Jae-yong as Park Kwang-dong, director of the National Intelligence Service
- Park Eun-hye as Kwon Sook-jung, an obstetrician
- Kim Ji-ho as Choi Soo-hyun (special appearance), a plastic surgeon and Kwak Chul-woo's ex wife
- Park Sun-young as Kang Ji-hye, Eom Chul-woo's wife
- An Mi-na as Song Soo-mi, a North Korean student
- Won Jin-ah as Ryeo Min-kyeong, a North Korean Student
- Lee Yoon-gun as Park Yong-gun
- Lee Chae-eun as Kwak Se-rim, Kwak Chul-woo and Choi Soo-hyun's daughter
- Kim Hyung-jong as Lee Hyang-pil, an aide to Kwak Chul-woo
- Kristen Dalton as Joanne Martin, CIA station chief in Seoul
- Ron Donachie as Michael Dobbs, US Secretary of State
- Kim Ki-hyeon as Park Ki-hyun, Prime Minister of North Korea
- Kim Joong-ki as Takashi, chief of the Korean office, Japanese Cabinet Intelligence and Research Office
- Andreas Fronk as Tyler, commander of United States Forces Korea
- Kwon Han-sol as North Korean guide
- Lee Ji-won as North Korean Hacker
- Park Min-hee as chairman of the National Security Council
- Daniel Joey Albright as a USAF pilot
- Lee Si-woo as Kwak Se-min, Kwak Chul-woo and Choi Soo-hyun's son
- Kim Tae-han as Chief Kim
- Kim Han-min as captain of Japanese Aegis ship (cameo)

== Awards and nominations ==
| Awards | Category | Recipient | Result | Ref. |
|---|---|---|---|---|
| 54th Baeksang Arts Awards | Best Director | Yang Woo-suk | Nominated | |
| 54th Baeksang Arts Awards | Best Actor | Jung Woo-sung | Nominated | |
| 54th Baeksang Arts Awards | Best Supporting Actor | Jo Woo-jin | Nominated | |
| 54th Baeksang Arts Awards | Best Screenplay | Ismat Azim, Jung Ha-yong | Nominated | |
| 23rd Chunsa Film Art Awards | Best Actor | Jung Woo-sung | Won | |
| 38th Korean Association of Film Critics Awards | Top 11 Films | Steel Rain | Won | |

== Sequel ==
A sequel Steel Rain 2: Summit was released on 29 July 2020. Jung Woo-sung and Kwak Do-won returned to star, but in different roles compared to the first film.

== See also ==
- Mutual assured destruction
- 2017–18 North Korea crisis
