= Hide and Seek (2013 film) =

- Film poster
- Hangul: 숨바꼭질
- RR: Sumbakkokjil
- MR: Sumbakkokchil
- Directed by: Huh Jung
- Written by: Huh Jung
- Produced by: Kim Eui-sung; Kim Mi-hee; Kim Mi-jin
- Starring: Son Hyun-joo; Moon Jeong-hee; Jeon Mi-seon
- Cinematography: Kim Il-yeon
- Edited by: Kim Sang-bum; Kim Jae-bum
- Music by: Jo Yeong-wook
- Production company: Studio Dream Capture
- Distributed by: Next Entertainment World
- Release date: August 14, 2013
- Running time: 107 minutes
- Country: South Korea
- Language: Korean
- Budget: ₩2.5 billion
- Box office: US$35.5 million

Hide and Seek (Korean: 숨바꼭질) is a 2013 South Korean horror-thriller film written and directed by Huh Jung in his feature directorial debut. It revolves around two families who believe strangers to be living and hiding in their homes, and struggle to fight back.

There is a Chinese remake/adaptation of this movie with the same title.

== Plot ==
A woman named Eun-Hye is stalked by a stranger who murders her in her apartment.

Sung-soo is a successful businessman who lives with his wife Min-ji and two children, Ho-se and Soo-ha in a penthouse. Despite his good life, he's harboring a dark secret. He was adopted by a rich family and despises their biological son and older stepbrother, Baek Sung-Chul. He framed Sung-Chul for sexual assault out of disgust toward his skin rash. Since that day, he has constant nightmares about his brother and regularly takes drugs to overcome his guilt.

One day, Sung-soo receives a phone call that his estranged brother is missing and goes to his brother's apartment for the first time in decades to look for him. There, he finds strange symbols carved into every door and meets his brother's neighbor Joo-hee and her young daughter Pyeong-Hwa. When Sung-Soo tells her he went to visit his brother, she suddenly become hostile and kicks them out of her room. Sung-Soo decides to stay in his brother's room.

During his stay, he discovers a secret passage that connects his room and Eun-Hye's room, finding the latter's underwear in Sung-Chul's drawers. Meanwhile, Min-Ji and the children are attacked by the same stranger who killed Eun-Hye. They theorize that the murderer was Sung-Chul, who wanted to get revenge on Sung-Soo for ruining his life.

Sung-soo later figures out that the symbols on the doors are "hide and seek codes" that indicate the gender and numbers of people. In their penthouse, he finds similar symbols, deducing that the stranger knows about his home. Min-Ji tells him they must return to America.

Sung-Soo goes to confront his brother, only to be attacked by the man stalking him. He discovers that the man is Eun-Hye's boyfriend, who also thought Sung-chul is the one who killed his girlfriend. In Eun-Hye's room, Sung-Soo finds the girl's corpse in her wardrobe. The killer fatally stabs Eun-hye's boyfriend and attacks Sung-Soo. He takes refuge in Joo-hee's room and finds his brother's corpse in her wardrobe, realizing Joo-hee is the killer before she knocks him unconscious, steals his wallet, and flees with Pyeong-Hwa.

It's revealed that Joo-hee and her daughter are deranged kleptomaniacs whose modus operandi is killing residents of apartments and pretending to be residents themselves. She killed Sung-Chul in order to lure his brother to come investigate and take over their penthouse. Min-Ji is attacked by Joo-hee, who attempts to kill Ho-se and Soo-ha. When Sung-Soo arrives, Joo-he attacks him again and gains the upper hand, but stops due to Sung-Soo threatening to burn up their penthouse if she kills him and his family. He persuades her to spare them in exchange for the penthouse, but she refuses and starts choking him, claiming that the penthouse is "hers". She almost kills him when Soo-ha distracts her long enough to allow Sung-Soo to burn the kitchen. Horrified, she lets go of Sung-Soo and tries in vain to stop the fire, only to end up burned to death in the process. The police manage to break in and secure the room while Sung-Soo cradles Min-Ji's unconscious body and their tearful children yell at her to wake up.

Some time later, Sung-Soo and his family visit the graves of his parents and Sung-Chul, finally making peace with his brother and freeing Sung-Soo from his guilt before they travel back to America. Their penthouse is now empty and occupied by a new family. As the new residents settle in, the camera turns on the wardrobe in which Pyeong-Hwa still hides, looking at them, narrating the voiceover from the beginning.

== Cast ==
Name	Role
Son Hyun-joo	--- Sung-soo
Moon Jeong-hee	--- Joo-hee
Jeon Mi-seon	--- Min-ji, Sung-soo's wife
Kim Ji-young	--- Pyeong-hwa, Joo-hee's daughter
Jung Joon-won	--- Ho-se, Sung-soo' son
Kim Su-an	--- Soo-ha, Sung-soo's daughter
Kim Won-hae	--- Sung-chul
Gi Ju-bong	--- Sung-soo's stepfather
Kim Han-Jong	--- man in hat
Jo Han-Chul	--- Jung-nam
Jo Si-Nae	--- Jung-nam's woman
Jung Min-Sung	--- Jo Min-hoon
Lee Young-Suk	--- homeless man
Lee Ho-Seong	--- detective
Kim Bo-Ryoung	--- policewoman
Noh Susanna	--- Eun-hye
Lee Jun-hyeok	--- Eun-hye's boyfriend
Joo Suk-Tae	--- ex-detective
Sung Yu-bin	--- Sung-chul (child)
Uhm Ji-Sung	--- Sung-soo (child)
Ri Min	--- head of apartment building management
Son Young-Soon	--- Hyang Goo Apartment elderly woman
Kim Ja-Young	--- Hyang Goo Apartment convenient store owner
Kim Hye-yoon	--- Middle school girl

== Box office ==
A low-budget (₩2.5 billion) thriller with no high-profile director or stars, Hide and Seek was an unexpected hit upon its release on August 14, 2013. It topped the box office on its opening weekend with 1.35 million ticket sales. As of December 22, 19 days after its release, the film has reached 5 million admissions.

== Awards and nominations ==
Year	Award	Category	Recipient	Result
2013	50th Grand Bell Awards	Best Actress	Moon Jeong-hee	Nominated
2013	50th Grand Bell Awards	Best New Director	Huh Jung	Nominated
2013	50th Grand Bell Awards	Best Music	Jo Yeong-wook	Nominated
2013	34th Blue Dragon Film Awards	Best Actress	Moon Jeong-hee	Nominated
2013	34th Blue Dragon Film Awards	Best Supporting Actress	Jeon Mi-seon	Nominated
2013	34th Blue Dragon Film Awards	Best New Director	Huh Jung	Nominated
2013	34th Blue Dragon Film Awards	Best Lighting	Lee Sung-jae	Nominated
2013	34th Blue Dragon Film Awards	Best Music	Jo Yeong-wook	Nominated
2013	33rd Korean Association of Film Critics Awards	Best New Director	Huh Jung	Won
2013	21st Korean Culture and Entertainment Awards	Excellence Award, Actress in Film	Jeon Mi-seon	Won
2014	19th Chunsa Film Art Awards	Best New Director	Huh Jung	Nominated
2014	50th Baeksang Arts Awards	Best Actor	Son Hyun-joo	Nominated
2014	50th Baeksang Arts Awards	Best Actress	Moon Jeong-hee	Nominated
2014	50th Baeksang Arts Awards	Best New Director	Huh Jung	Nominated
2014	50th Baeksang Arts Awards	Best Screenplay	Huh Jung	Nominated
2014	23rd Buil Film Awards	Best Actor	Son Hyun-joo	Nominated
2014	23rd Buil Film Awards	Best New Director	Huh Jung	Nominated
2014	23rd Buil Film Awards	Best Music	Jo Yeong-wook	Nominated
2014	34th Golden Cinema Festival	Best Supporting Actress	Jeon Mi-seon	Won
2014	34th Golden Cinema Festival	Special Jury Prize	Moon Jeong-hee	Won
