= The Attorney =

2013 South Korean historical drama film

- Theatrical release poster
- Hangul: 변호인
- Hanja: 辯護人
- RR: Byeonhoin
- MR: Pyŏnhoin
- Directed by: Yang Woo-suk
- Written by: Yang Woo-suk; Yoon Hyeon-ho
- Produced by: Choi Jeong-ho; Choi Jae-won
- Starring: Song Kang-ho; Kim Young-ae; Oh Dal-su; Kwak Do-won; Yim Si-wan
- Cinematography: Lee Tae-yoon
- Edited by: Kim Sang-bum; Kim Jae-bum
- Music by: Jo Yeong-wook
- Production company: Withus Film
- Distributed by: Next Entertainment World
- Release date: December 18, 2013
- Running time: 127 minutes
- Country: South Korea
- Language: Korean
- Box office: US$74.1 million

The Attorney (Korean: 변호인; RR: Byeonhoin) is a 2013 South Korean legal drama film directed and co-written by Yang Woo-suk in his directorial debut. With 11,375,954 tickets sold and a revenue of ₩82.9 billion, The Attorney became the 15th-best-selling Korean film of all time and the second-highest-grossing Korean film of 2013.

It was inspired by the real-life "Burim case" of 1981 when, during the authoritarian Chun Doo-hwan regime, 22 students, teachers and office workers who belonged to a book club were arrested without warrants on fabricated charges that they were North Korea sympathizers. Roh Moo-hyun, then a tax lawyer from Busan, formed a legal team with his allies, including Moon Jae-in and Kim Kwang-il, to defend the arrested individuals against the government. After the case, Roh became an influential human rights lawyer throughout the 1980s; he later entered politics and became the 9th president of South Korea. Later, Moon Jae-in also became the 12th president of South Korea.

== Plot ==
In 1978, a former judge named Song moves to Busan to start his own law firm. The other lawyers look down on him because he had passed the bar-examination without ever going to university. Soon, however, he becomes rich from accepting the cases which his colleagues shun, even though they are the most profitable, such as real estate and taxation. Meanwhile, a detective named Cha is given orders from the highest levels of leadership to purge Busan of communists, even if it means resorting to fabrication. A medical officer from a nearby military base, Lt Yoon, is sent to oversee the health of the victims whom Cha's agents will torture.

Years later, in 1981, Song is enjoying his new-found fame and respect, and he even buys a sailboat with the hope of competing in the 1988 Seoul Olympics. One night, while dining at his favorite restaurant with his high school classmates, he gets into a fight with a journalist named Lee who sympathizes with the frequent student protests and claims that the mass media is inherently deceptive. A short time later, a high school student named Park, the son of the restaurant's owner, goes missing. Park's mother, Choi, frantically searches for him for nearly two months, even closing the restaurant, before it is revealed that Park and some other students are to face a trial for sedition.

Realizing that the students' confessions were extracted using torture, Song agrees to take the case. At the trial, he notices a number of violations of the Korean constitution, but is told by the prosecutors and the judge that normal laws do not apply in cases of national security. The prosecutors begin by arguing that the students studied a book called What Is History? by EH Carr. In response, Song gets a note from the British consulate attesting that EH Carr was a British ambassador, not a communist ideologue. Song is stunned, however, when Cha openly lies on the stand and denies that the defendants were tortured, claiming rather brazenly that all of their bruises and other injuries were self-inflicted.

A breakthrough happens when Lt Yoon agrees to testify. Lt Yoon confesses to the court that the defendants were tortured and is willing to describe the methods of their torture in detail. However, Cha reports the situation to his leadership, and they are able to frame Lt Yoon for desertion, thereby nullifying his testimony and sending him off to prison. The case is lost but the judge offers leniency by giving the students 2 years in prison at most.

By 1987, Song is a changed man and has become a protest leader himself. One day he is arrested for his activities and charged with sedition. To his amazement, 99 out of the 142 lawyers in Busan attend his hearing and express their support. Even so, free speech and the rule of law remain controversial subjects in Korea.

== Cast ==
- Song Kang-ho as Song Woo-suk
- Kim Young-ae as Choi Soon-ae
- Oh Dal-su as Park Dong-ho
- Kwak Do-won as Cha Dong-young
- Yim Si-wan as Park Jin-woo
- Lee Sung-min as Lee Yoon-taek
- Jung Won-joong as Attorney Kim Sang-pil
- Song Young-chang as Judge
- Jo Min-ki as Prosecutor Kang Young-cheol
- Lee Hang-na as Song Woo-seok's wife
- Cha Eun-jae as Miss Moon
- Jung Joon-won as Song Gun-woo
- Cha Gwang-soo as Park Byeong-ho
- Lee Seon-hee as Evening school student
- Ryu Soo-young as Lee Chang-joon (cameo)

== Box office ==
Within ten days of its release, The Attorney had been seen by over 3.4 million people in South Korea. By the end of the year it became the 8th best-selling local movie of all time.

It reached 7.8 million admissions in 18 days, making it the fastest Korean film to pass 7 million admissions since the 2012 film The Thieves, which did it in 13 days. It became the tenth movie to break the 10 million admissions mark in Korea.

The film grossed a total of ₩82,880,761,300 in South Korea, with 11,375,954 tickets sold.

== Awards and nominations ==
Year	Award	Category	Recipient	Result
2014	8th Asian Film Awards	Best Actor	Song Kang-ho	Nominated
2014	8th Asian Film Awards	Best Supporting Actress	Kim Young-ae	Nominated
2014	8th Asian Film Awards	Best Newcomer	Yim Si-wan	Nominated
2014	16th Udine Far East Film Festival	Black Dragon Audience Award	The Attorney	Won
2014	16th Udine Far East Film Festival	First Runner-up, Golden Mulberry Award	The Attorney	Won
2014	19th Chunsa Film Art Awards	Best Actor	Song Kang-ho	Won
2014	19th Chunsa Film Art Awards	Best New Director	Yang Woo-suk	Won
2014	50th Baeksang Arts Awards	Grand Prize (Daesang) for Film	Song Kang-ho	Won
2014	50th Baeksang Arts Awards	Best Film	The Attorney	Won
2014	50th Baeksang Arts Awards	Best Actor	Song Kang-ho	Nominated
2014	50th Baeksang Arts Awards	Best Supporting Actor	Kwak Do-won	Nominated
2014	50th Baeksang Arts Awards	Best Supporting Actress	Kim Young-ae	Nominated
2014	50th Baeksang Arts Awards	Best New Director	Yang Woo-suk	Won
2014	50th Baeksang Arts Awards	Best New Actor	Yim Si-wan	Nominated
2014	50th Baeksang Arts Awards	Best Screenplay	Yang Woo-suk, Yoon Hyeon-ho	Nominated
2014	14th Director's Cut Awards	Best Actor	Song Kang-ho	Won
2014	14th Director's Cut Awards	Best New Director	Yang Woo-suk	Won
2014	14th Director's Cut Awards	Best Producer	Choi Jae-won	Won
2014	23rd Buil Film Awards	Best Film	The Attorney	Nominated
2014	23rd Buil Film Awards	Best Director	Yang Woo-suk	Nominated
2014	23rd Buil Film Awards	Best Actor	Song Kang-ho	Won
2014	23rd Buil Film Awards	Best Supporting Actor	Kwak Do-won	Won
2014	23rd Buil Film Awards	Best Supporting Actress	Kim Young-ae	Won
2014	23rd Buil Film Awards	Best New Director	Yang Woo-suk	Nominated
2014	23rd Buil Film Awards	Best New Actor	Yim Si-wan	Nominated
2014	23rd Buil Film Awards	Best Screenplay	Yang Woo-suk, Yoon Hyeon-ho	Nominated
2014	23rd Buil Film Awards	Buil Reader's Jury Award	The Attorney	Won
2014	34th Korean Association of Film Critics Awards	Best Supporting Actor	Kwak Do-won	Won
2014	34th Korean Association of Film Critics Awards	Best New Director	Yang Woo-suk	Won
2014	34th Korean Association of Film Critics Awards	Critics' Top 10	The Attorney	Won
2014	51st Grand Bell Awards	Best Film	The Attorney	Nominated
2014	51st Grand Bell Awards	Best Actor	Song Kang-ho	Nominated
2014	51st Grand Bell Awards	Best Supporting Actor	Kwak Do-won	Nominated
2014	51st Grand Bell Awards	Best Supporting Actress	Kim Young-ae	Won
2014	51st Grand Bell Awards	Best New Director	Yang Woo-suk	Won
2014	51st Grand Bell Awards	Best New Actor	Yim Si-wan	Nominated
2014	51st Grand Bell Awards	Best Screenplay	Yang Woo-suk, Yoon Hyeon-ho	Won
2014	51st Grand Bell Awards	Best Cinematography	Lee Tae-yoon	Nominated
2014	51st Grand Bell Awards	Best Editing	Kim Sang-bum, Kim Jae-bum	Nominated
2014	51st Grand Bell Awards	Best Art Direction	Ryu Seong-hui	Nominated
2014	51st Grand Bell Awards	Best Lighting	Oh Seung-chul	Nominated
2014	51st Grand Bell Awards	Hana Financial Group Star Award (Popularity Award)	Yim Si-wan	Won
2014	35th Blue Dragon Film Awards	Best Film	The Attorney	Won
2014	35th Blue Dragon Film Awards	Best Actor	Song Kang-ho	Won
2014	35th Blue Dragon Film Awards	Best Supporting Actor	Kwak Do-won	Nominated
2014	35th Blue Dragon Film Awards	Best Supporting Actress	Kim Young-ae	Won
2014	35th Blue Dragon Film Awards	Best New Director	Yang Woo-suk	Nominated
2014	35th Blue Dragon Film Awards	Best New Actor	Yim Si-wan	Nominated
2014	35th Blue Dragon Film Awards	Best Screenplay	Yang Woo-suk, Yoon Hyeon-ho	Nominated
2014	35th Blue Dragon Film Awards	Best Cinematography	Lee Tae-yoon	Nominated
2014	35th Blue Dragon Film Awards	Best Editing	Kim Sang-bum, Kim Jae-bum	Nominated
2014	35th Blue Dragon Film Awards	Best Lighting	Oh Seung-chul	Nominated
2014	35th Blue Dragon Film Awards	Best Music	Jo Yeong-wook	Nominated
2014	35th Blue Dragon Film Awards	Popular Star Award	Yim Si-wan	Won
2014	Korea Film Actor's Association Awards	Korea's Top Film Star	Song Kang-ho	Won
2014	Korea Film Actor's Association Awards	Popularity Award	Yim Si-wan	Won
2014	9th Max Movie Awards	Best Actor	Song Kang-ho	Won
2014	9th Max Movie Awards	Best Supporting Actor	Kwak Do-won	Won
2014	9th Max Movie Awards	Best Supporting Actress	Kim Young-ae	Won
2014	9th Max Movie Awards	Best New Actor	Yim Si-wan	Won
2014	3rd Marie Claire Film Awards	Best New Actor	Yim Si-wan	Won
