= Kim Young-ae =

South Korean actress (1951–2017)

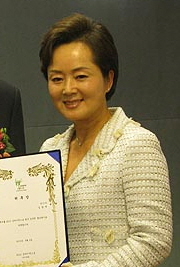
- Kim in 2010
- Born: April 21, 1951; Pusan, South Korea
- Died: April 9, 2017 (aged 65); Seoul, South Korea
- Education: Busan Girls' Commercial High School
- Occupation: Actress
- Years active: 1971–2017
- Agent: Star Village Entertainment

Korean name
- Hangul: 김영애
- Hanja: 金姈愛
- RR: Gim Yeongae
- MR: Kim Yŏngae

Kim Young-ae (Korean: 김영애; 21 April 1951 – 9 April 2017) was a South Korean actress.

== Career ==
Kim Young-ae began her acting career when she joined MBC's 3rd Open Recruitment in 1971. She made her acting debut in the TV police procedural Chief Inspector and subsequently built a prolific career in film and television.

After she made her film debut in 1973's Long Live the Island Frogs, Kim became most active on the big screen in the 1970s and early 1980s, appearing in films such as Wang Sib Ri, My Hometown (also known as Wangsimni or A Bygone Romance, 1976), Suddenly at Midnight (1981), and Diary of King Yeonsan (1987).

As she grew older, Kim transitioned to more television work. Among her notable television dramas are Queen Min (1973), Ilchul (or Sunrise, 1989), Magpie-in-law (1991), The Brothers' River (1996), Waves (1999), Go, Mom, Go! (2003), Hwang Jini (2006), Royal Family (2011), and Moon Embracing the Sun (2012).

In 2009, she drew praise for her portrayal of a terminally ill yet headstrong mother who has a love-hate relationship with her daughter in the dramedy film Aeja (internationally known as Goodbye Mom). Another notable role was as a Busan restaurant owner whose son is arrested and tortured during the 1980s in The Attorney (2013). Kim later won Best Supporting Actress at the Grand Bell Awards and the Blue Dragon Film Awards for her performances.

== Other activities ==
In 2006, Kim temporarily put her acting career on hold when she became the vice chairman of cosmetics firm Chamtowon, which mainly produces soap and mud packs. Her company filed a ₩20 billion lawsuit against state-owned network KBS in 2008, after the program Consumer Report falsely reported that Chamtowon's mud-based products contained heavy metals above safe levels. During the eight months after the broadcast, the company went virtually bankrupt, and had to suspend operations at its factory in Jeongeup in North Jeolla Province and lay off 100 workers. After the Korea Food and Drug Administration confirmed that the magnetic substance found in the mud products was oxidized steel originally present in the mud, not foreign materials put in the products during the manufacturing process, the court ruled in favor of Chamtowon, and ordered KBS to release a correction regarding the wrong report. But Chamtowon wasn't able to recover from its financial losses, and the strain contributed to Kim's divorce from her husband.

== Death ==
Kim died of pancreatic cancer on April 9, 2017, just two weeks before her 66th birthday.

== Filmography ==
=== Film ===
Year	Title	Role	Notes
1973	Long Live the Island Frogs		
1973	A Female Sailor		
1976	Wang Sib Ri, My Hometown		
1976	An Unfortunate Woman		
1976	An Extinguished Window		
1977	The First Snow		
1977	Snow Country		
1978	Climax		
1978	A Light Goes Off in Your Window		
1979	Romance Gray		
1979	Red Gate to Tragedy		
1979	Portrait of a Rock		
1979	Who Knows This Pain?		
1980	The Hidden Hero		
1980	The Outsiders		
1980	A Fine, Windy Day	Woman at the outdoor food stand	
1981	Freezing Point '81		
1981	Ban Geum-ryeon		
1981	Love Me Once Again 2		
1981	Two Sons		
1981	Suddenly at Midnight	Seon-hee	
1982	The Carriage Running into Winter		
1982	The Whereabouts of Eve		
1982	I Loved		
1982	Champions of Tomorrow		
1983	Fiery Wind		
1983	Madam Oh's Day Out		
1983	Wife		
1983	The Rose and the Gambler		
1984	Like a Petal or a Leaf		
1984	Woman Who Grabbed the Rod		
1984	To My Children With Love		
1985	Tragedy of W		
1985	Dreams of the Strong		
1986	Rain Falling on Yeongdong Bridge		
1986	Street of Desire		
1986	Riding the Moonlight		
1986	Wanderer in Winter		
1987	A Long Journey, A Long Tunnel		
1987	Eve's Second Bedroom		
1987	The Hero Returns		
1987	A Woman on the Verge		
1987	Diary of King Yeonsan	Princess Consort Seungpyeong / Deposed Queen Yoon	
1988	Miri, Mari, Uri, Duri		
1988	The Invalid		
1990	You Know What, It's a Secret		
1991	Do You Like Afternoons After the Rain?		
1991	Blood and Fire		
1995	Piano in Winter		
1998	Naked Being		
2002	Bet On My Disco		
2003	Star		
2003	Please Teach Me English	Young-ju's mother	
2009	Goodbye Mom	Choi Young-hee	
2012	Confession of Murder	Han Ji-soo	
2014	The Attorney	Choi Soon-ae	
2014	Cart	Mrs. Soon-rye	
2014	We Are Brothers	Seung-ja	
2014	Entangled	Soon-im	
2015	Chronicle of a Blood Merchant	Gye-hwa's mom	
2016	Proof of Innocence		
2016	Operation Chromite	Na Jeong-nim	Special appearance
2016	Pandora	Mrs. Seok	

=== Television series ===
Year	Title	Role
1971	Chief Inspector	Guest
1973	Queen Min	Empress Myeongseong
1974	Gangnam Family	Second daughter Young-hee
1978	I Sell Happiness	—N/a
1978	Trap of Youth	Noh Young-joo
1979	Mom, I Like Dad	—N/a
1979	Oddogi Squad	Kim Hyo-shik
1979	Become a Mountain and Become a River	—N/a
1980	Portrait of Youth	
1980	Prince Imperial Ui	Empress Myeongseong
1981	Na-ri's House	—N/a
1981	Han River	—N/a
1981	Let's Love	—N/a
1981	Embrace	—N/a
1981	Nocturne	—N/a
1981	Lee Shim's Tragic Love	Lee Shim
1982	Three Sisters	—N/a
1982	Foggy	Empress Myeongseong
1983	Your Portrait	—N/a
1983	Sunflower in Winter	—N/a
1983	Thaw	—N/a
1983	500 Years of Joseon: "Tree With Deep Roots"	Queen Soheon
1985	Mother's Room	—N/a
1986	Natalia	여간첩 나타리아
1986	Im Illera Im Illera	—N/a
1987	Portrait of Life	—N/a
1987	The Beginning of Love	Yoo Soon-joo
1987	Terms of Endearment	—N/a
1988	The 7th Ward	—N/a
1988	13-year-old Bom	—N/a
1988	Soonshim-yi	—N/a
1989	Ilchul	—N/a
1989	Wang Rung's Family	—N/a
1990	Copper Ring	Bok-il
1990	Freezing Point	Seo Hye-yeon
1990	Geom Saeng-yi's daughter	Shaman
1990	Days of the Dynasty	Imperial Noble Consort Sunheon
1990	Our Beloved Sinner	—N/a
1991	Magpie-in-law	—N/a
1991	Silent's Land	—N/a
1991	Asphalt My Hometown	Host
1991	Yesterday's Green Grass	Jung-mi
1992	People of Love Town	—N/a
1992	For the Sake of Love	Soo-wan's mother-in-law (special appearance)
1992	Autumn Woman	Jeong Yeon-hee
1993	Survivor's Grief	—N/a
1993	White Maze	—N/a
1993	Happiness Without You	Hye-seon
1993	When I Miss You	Hyun-joo
1994	Scent of Love	Myung-hee
1994	Winter in Dohwari	—N/a
1995	Sandglass	Tae-soo's mother
1995	Jang Hui-bin	Queen Jangryeol
1995	Your Voice	—N/a
1996	Father	—N/a
1996	Wealthy Yu-chun	Kim Jung-ja - Hwa-won's mother-in-law
1996	Colors: Gray	Soo-hye
1996	An Jung-Geun	Empress Myeongseong
1996	Reporting for Duty	Colonel Principal of Women's Army Corps school
1996	Until We Can Love	Soo-ryun
1996	The Brothers' River	Lee Soon-rye
1996	Power of Love	Seol Ok-soon
1997	Beautiful Face	—N/a
1997	Woman	Ki Nam's mother
1997	Over the Horizon	Seo Boo-yong
1997	Only You	Yang-ja
1997	Wedding Dress	Shin Jung-ja
1998	Please Find My Dad	—N/a
1998	Legend of Ambition	Shin Ok-joo
1998	Panther of Kilimanjaro	—N/a
1998	White Nights 3.98	Hong Young-sook
1998	I Love You, I'm Sorry	—N/a
1998	Hug	Lee Hye-sook
1998	The King's Path	Sukbin Choi
1998	Seven Brides	—N/a
1999	Did We Really Love?	Jung Jin-sook
1999	Waves	—N/a
1999	Did You Ever Love?	Oh Myung-joo
2000	Did You Ever Love?	Oh Myung-joo
2000	Look Back in Anger	Dong-hoon's mother
2000	Can Anyone Love	—N/a
2000	Dandelion	Kang Hae-soon
2000	She's More Beautiful Than a Flower	Joon Young's mother
2000	Cheers for the Women	Da Young's mother
2001	Cheers for the Women	Da Young's mother
2001	Tender Hearts	Lee Jae-kyong
2001	Legend	—N/a
2001	Why Women	—N/a
2002	We Are Dating Now	Yeol-sun
2002	Rival	Hong Joo-kyung
2002	Golden Pond	Hae Soon's mother
2002	The Maengs' Golden Era	Ji Ha-ja (Choi Kyu-sik's mother)
2002	Royal Story: Jang Hui-bin	Queen Myeongseong
2003	Love Letter	Dr. Im Kyung-eun
2003	Go Mom, Go!	—N/a
2004	Old Miss Diary	—N/a
2006	Hwang Jini	Im Baek-Mu
2007	My Husband's Woman	Hwa-young's mother
2010	Athena: Goddess of War	Choi Jin-hee
2011	Royal Family	Gong Soon-ho
2011	Heaven's Garden	Hwa-Young (Boo-Sik's wife)
2012	Heaven's Garden	Hwa-Young (Boo-Sik's wife)
2012	My Lover, Madame Butterfly	Lee Jung Ae
2012	Moon Embracing the Sun	Grand Royal Queen Dowager
2013	Medical Top Team	Deputy Director
2013	After School: Lucky or Not	Guest
2014	Liar Game	Cha Woo-jin's Mother
2014	Birth of a Beauty	Ko Soon-dong
2015	Kill Me, Heal Me	Seo Tae-lim
2016	Secret Healer	Queen Munjeong
2016	The Doctors	Kang Mal-soon
2016	The Gentlemen of Wolgyesu Tailor Shop	Choi Gook-ji

== Radio program ==
- This Is Hwang In-yong and Kim Young-ae (KBS, 1992)

== Awards ==
- 2017 KBS Drama Awards: Special Achievement Award
- 2017 54th Grand Bell Awards: Special Award
- 2017 53rd Baeksang Arts Awards: Lifetime Achievement Award
- 2015 8th Korea Drama Awards: Lifetime Achievement Award
- 2014 35th Blue Dragon Film Awards: Best Supporting Actress (The Attorney)
- 2014 51st Grand Bell Awards: Best Supporting Actress (The Attorney)
- 2014 23rd Buil Film Awards: Best Supporting Actress (The Attorney)
- 2014 9th Max Movie Awards: Best Supporting Actress (The Attorney)
- 2011 MBC Drama Awards: Special Award (Royal Family)
- 2010 7th Max Movie Awards: Best Supporting Actress (Goodbye Mom)
- 2009 46th Grand Bell Awards: Best Supporting Actress (Goodbye Mom)
- 2000 SBS Drama Awards: Top Excellence Award, Actress (Waves)
- 2000 SBS Drama Awards: Big Star Award (Cheers for the Women)
- 2000 27th Korea Broadcasting Awards: Best TV Actress (Waves)
- 2000 36th Baeksang Arts Awards: Best TV Actress (Waves)
- 1997 KBS Drama Awards: Top Excellence Award, Actress (Colors, Reporting for Duty, Until We Can Love)
- 1997 33rd Baeksang Arts Awards: Best TV Actress (The Brothers' River)
- 1990 KBS Drama Awards: Top Excellence Award, Actress (Ilchul)
- 1982 18th Baeksang Arts Awards: Best TV Actress (Nocturne)
- 1974 MBC Talent Awards: Excellence Award, Actress
- 1974 10th Baeksang Arts Awards: Best New TV Actress (Queen Min)
