= 51st Grand Bell Awards =

2014 edition of award ceremony

- Official poster
- Date: November 21, 2014
- Site: KBS Hall in Yeouido, Seoul
- Hosted by: Shin Hyun-joon; Uhm Jung-hwa; Oh Man-seok

Television coverage
- Network: KBS2

The 51st Grand Bell Awards (Korean: 대종상 영화제; RR: Daejongsang Yeonghwajae), also known as Daejong Film Awards, are determined and presented annually by The Motion Pictures Association of Korea for excellence in film in South Korea. The Grand Bell Awards were first presented in 1962 and have gained prestige as the Korean equivalent of the American Academy Awards.

== 51st ceremony ==
The 51st Grand Bell Awards ceremony was held at the KBS Hall in Yeouido, Seoul on November 21, 2014 and hosted by Shin Hyun-joon, Uhm Jung-hwa and Oh Man-seok.

== Nominations and winners ==
(Winners denoted in bold)

Best Film	Best Director
**The Admiral: Roaring Currents**; The Attorney; A Hard Day; Hope; Whistle Blower	**Kim Seong-hun** - **A Hard Day**; Lee Joon-ik - Hope; Kang Hyeong-cheol - Tazza: The Hidden Card; Kim Han-min - The Admiral: Roaring Currents; Yim Soon-rye - Whistle Blower
Best Actor	Best Actress
**Choi Min-sik** - **The Admiral: Roaring Currents**; Jung Woo-sung - The Divine Move; Gang Dong-won - Kundo: Age of the Rampant; Park Hae-il - Whistle Blower; Song Kang-ho - The Attorney	**Son Ye-jin** - **The Pirates**; Chun Woo-hee - Han Gong-ju; Jeon Do-yeon - Way Back Home; Shim Eun-kyung - Miss Granny; Uhm Ji-won - Hope
Best Supporting Actor	Best Supporting Actress
**Yoo Hae-jin** - **The Pirates**; Cho Jin-woong - A Hard Day; Kim In-kwon - The Divine Move; Kwak Do-won - The Attorney; Lee Geung-young - Whistle Blower	**Kim Young-ae** - **The Attorney**; Han Ye-ri - Haemoo; Jo Yeo-jeong - Obsessed; Ra Mi-ran - Hope; Yoon Ji-hye - Kundo: Age of the Rampant
Best New Actor	Best New Actress
**Park Yoo-chun** - **Haemoo**; Ahn Jae-hong - The King of Jokgu; Choi Jin-hyuk - The Divine Move; Yeo Jin-goo - Hwayi: A Monster Boy; Yim Si-wan - The Attorney	**Lim Ji-yeon** - **Obsessed**; Esom - Scarlet Innocence; Kim Hyang-gi - Thread of Lies; Kim Sae-ron - A Girl at My Door; Lee Ha-nui - Tazza: The Hidden Card
Best New Director	Best Screenplay
**Yang Woo-suk** - **The Attorney**; July Jung - A Girl at My Door; Lee Do-yun - Confession; Lee Su-jin - Han Gong-ju; Shim Sung-bo - Haemoo	**Yang Woo-suk, Yoon Hyeon-ho** - **The Attorney**; Kim Seong-hun - A Hard Day; Lee Do-yun - Confession; Lee Su-jin - Han Gong-ju; Shin Dong-ik, Hong Yun-jeong, Dong Hee-seon - Miss Granny
Best Cinematography	Best Editing
**Kim Tae-seong** - **A Hard Day**; Hong Kyung-pyo - Haemoo; Kim Tae-seong - The Admiral: Roaring Currents; Kim Young-ho - The Pirates; Lee Tae-yoon - The Attorney	**Shin Min-kyung** - **The Divine Move**; Kim Chang-ju - A Hard Day; Kim Sang-bum, Kim Jae-bum - The Attorney; Kim Sun-min - Whistle Blower; Steve M. Choe - Confession
Best Art Direction	Best Lighting
**Cho Hwa-sung** - **The Fatal Encounter**; Jang Choon-seob - The Admiral: Roaring Currents; Kim Ji-a - The Pirates; Park Il-hyun - Kundo: Age of the Rampant; Ryu Seong-hui - The Attorney	**Kim Gyeong-seok** - **A Hard Day**; Hwang Soon-wook - The Pirates; Kim Chang-ho - Haemoo; Kim Gyeong-seok - The Admiral: Roaring Currents; Oh Seung-chul - The Attorney
Best Costume Design	Best Music
**Jo Sang-gyeong** - **Kundo: Age of the Rampant**; Jeong Gyeong-hee - The Fatal Encounter; Kwak Jeong-ae - Obsessed; Kwon Yu-jin, Im Seung-hee - The Admiral: Roaring Currents; Kwon Yu-jin, Im Seung-hee - The Pirates	**Mowg** - **Miss Granny**; Jo Yeong-wook - Kundo: Age of the Rampant; Mowg - The Fatal Encounter; Kim Jun-seok - Tazza: The Hidden Card; Kim Tae-seong - The Admiral: Roaring Currents
Technical Award	Best Planning
**Yun Dae-won** - **The Admiral: Roaring Currents (Special Effects)**; Lee Jeon-hyeong, Jo Yong-seok - Kundo: Age of the Rampant (Visual Effects); Lee Seung-yup - The Pirates (Sound); Yang Kil-young - The Fatal Encounter (Martial Arts)	**Kim Han-min** - **The Admiral: Roaring Currents**
Popularity Award	Lifetime Achievement Award
**Kim Woo-bin** - **Friend: The Great Legacy**; **Lee Ha-nui** - **Tazza: The Hidden Card**; **Yim Si-wan** - **The Attorney**	**Jung Jin-woo** (Director)
