= 35th Blue Dragon Film Awards =

2014 edition of award ceremony

- Date: December 17, 2014
- Site: Sejong Center for the Performing Arts, Seoul
- Hosted by: Kim Hye-soo; Yoo Jun-sang

Television coverage
- Network: SBS

The 35th Blue Dragon Film Awards ceremony was held on December 17, 2014 at the Sejong Center for the Performing Arts in Seoul. It was broadcast on SBS and hosted by Kim Hye-soo and Yoo Jun-sang.

== Nominations and winners ==
Complete list of nominees and winners:

(Winners denoted in bold)

| Best Film | Best Director |
|---|---|
| **The Attorney**; The Admiral: Roaring Currents; A Hard Day; Miss Granny; Whistle Blower | **Kim Han-min** - **The Admiral: Roaring Currents**; Hwang Dong-hyuk - Miss Granny; Kim Seong-hun - A Hard Day; Lee Seok-hoon - The Pirates; Yim Soon-rye - Whistle Blower |
| Best Actor | Best Actress |
| **Song Kang-ho** - **The Attorney**; Choi Min-sik - The Admiral: Roaring Currents; Jung Woo-sung - The Divine Move; Lee Sun-kyun - A Hard Day; Park Hae-il - Whistle Blower | **Chun Woo-hee** - **Han Gong-ju**; Jeon Do-yeon - Way Back Home; Kim Hee-ae - Thread of Lies; Shim Eun-kyung - Miss Granny; Son Ye-jin - Blood and Ties |
| Best Supporting Actor | Best Supporting Actress |
| **Cho Jin-woong** - **A Hard Day**; Kwak Do-won - The Attorney; Lee Geung-young - Whistle Blower; Lee Sung-min - Kundo: Age of the Rampant; Yoo Hae-jin - The Pirates | **Kim Young-ae** - **The Attorney**; Han Ye-ri - Haemoo; Jo Yeo-jeong - Obsessed; Lee Ha-nui - Tazza: The Hidden Card; Ra Mi-ran - My Love, My Bride |
| Best New Actor | Best New Actress |
| **Park Yoo-chun** - **Haemoo**; Ahn Jae-hong - The King of Jokgu; Choi Jin-hyuk - The Divine Move; Kim Woo-bin - Friend: The Great Legacy; Yim Si-wan - The Attorney | **Kim Sae-ron** - **A Girl at My Door**; Esom - Scarlet Innocence; Kim Yoo-jung - Thread of Lies; Lim Ji-yeon - Obsessed; Ryu Hye-young - My Dictator |
| Best New Director | Best Screenplay |
| **Lee Su-jin** - **Han Gong-ju**; Guk Dong-seok - Blood and Ties; Shim Sung-bo - Haemoo; Woo Moon-gi - The King of Jokgu; Yang Woo-suk - The Attorney | **Kim Seong-hun** - **A Hard Day**; Lee Su-jin - Han Gong-ju; Shim Sung-bo, Bong Joon-ho - Haemoo; Shin Dong-ik, Hong Yun-jeong, Dong Hee-seon - Miss Granny; Yang Woo-suk, Yoon Hyeon-ho - The Attorney |
| Best Cinematography | Best Editing |
| **Choi Chan-min** - **Kundo: Age of the Rampant**; Hong Kyung-pyo - Haemoo; Kim Tae-seong - The Admiral: Roaring Currents; Kim Tae-seong - A Hard Day; Lee Tae-yoon - The Attorney | **Kim Chang-ju** - **A Hard Day**; Choi Hyun-sook - Han Gong-ju; Kim Sang-bum, Kim Jae-bum - The Attorney; Nam Na-yeong - Tazza: The Hidden Card; Shin Min-kyung - The Divine Move |
| Best Art Direction | Best Lighting |
| **Lee Ha-jun** - **Haemoo**; Jang Choon-seob - The Admiral: Roaring Currents; Kim Ji-a - The Pirates; Kim Ji-soo - Obsessed; Park Il-hyun - Kundo: Age of the Rampant | **Yu Yeong-jong** - **Kundo: Age of the Rampant**; Kim Chang-ho - Haemoo; Kim Gyeong-seok - The Admiral: Roaring Currents; Kim Gyeong-seok - A Hard Day; Oh Seung-chul - The Attorney |
| Best Music | Technical Award |
| **Jo Yeong-wook** - **Kundo: Age of the Rampant**; Jo Yeong-wook - The Attorney; Kim Jun-seok - Tazza: The Hidden Card; Kim Tae-seong - The Admiral: Roaring Currents; Mowg - Miss Granny | **Kang Jong-ik** - **The Pirates (Visual Effects)**; Choi Bong-rok - The Divine Move (Martial Arts); Jung Doo-hong, Kang Young-mook - Kundo: Age of the Rampant (Martial Arts); Song Jong-hee - My Dictator (Special Make-up); Yun Dae-won - The Admiral: Roaring Currents (Special Effects) |
Best Short Film
**Mrs. Young**
| Popular Star Award | Audience Choice Award for Most Popular Film |
| **Kim Woo-bin** - **Friend: The Great Legacy**; **Shin Se-kyung** - **Tazza: The Hidden Card**; **Song Seung-heon** - **Obsessed**; **Yim Si-wan** - **The Attorney** | **The Admiral: Roaring Currents** |
