= Huh Jung =

South Korean filmmaker (born 1981)

- Born: 1981 (age 44–45); South Korea
- Occupations: Film director screenwriter

Korean name
- Hangul: 허정
- RR: Heo Jeong
- MR: Hŏ Chŏng

Huh Jung (Korean: 허정; born 1981) is a South Korean film director and screenwriter. Huh's directorial debut - a low-budget horror-thriller Hide and Seek (2013) starring Son Hyun-joo, was an unexpected hit in 2013 with 5.6 million admissions. His second feature - also a horror film, titled The Mimic, stars actress Yum Jung-ah and released in 2017.

== Filmography ==
- Goldfish (short film, 2004) - producer-director
- Dancing Boy (short film, 2005) - actor
- Let Me Free (short film, 2006) - cinematography dept
- The Cursed (short film, 2010) - director, screenwriter
- Rolling Home With a Bull (2010) - directing dept
- The Wish (short film, 2012) - director, screenwriter
- Moment (short film, 2012) - director
- Big Good (2013) - actor, production sound mixer
- Hide and Seek (2013) - director, screenwriter
- The Mimic (2017) - director, screenwriter

== Awards ==
- 2013 33rd Korean Association of Film Critics Awards: Best New Director (Hide and Seek)
