= List of awards and nominations received by Song Kang-ho =

Song Kang-ho awards and nominations
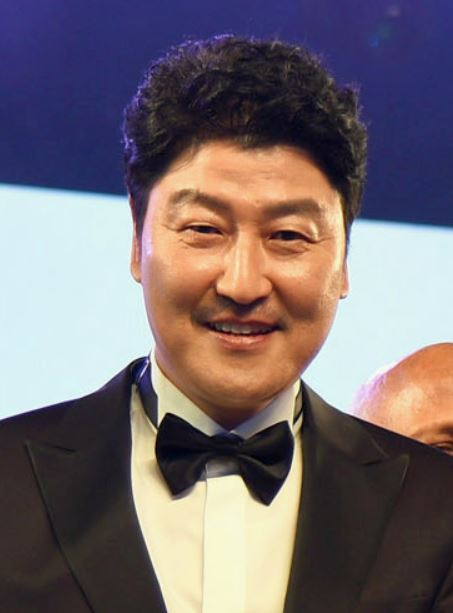
- Song in 2016
Awards and nominations
Award	Wins	Nominations
Asian Film Awards	1	5
Asia-Pacific Film Festival	1	1
Baeksang Arts Awards	3	13
BAFTA Awards	1	1
Blue Dragon Awards	4	18
Buil Film Awards	2	4
Busan Film Critics Awards	1	1
Cannes Film Festival	1	1
Chunsa Film Art Awards	3	9
Critics' Choice Awards	1	1
Deauville Asian Film Festival	1	1
Director's Cut Awards	7	8
Fantasia Film Festival	2	2
Grand Bell Awards	6	6
Golden Cinematographer Award	3	3
Korean Association of Film Critics Awards	4	8
Korean Film Awards	1	1
KOFRA Film Awards	3	5
Locarno International Film Festival	1	1
Los Angeles Film Critics Association Awards	1	1
National Society of Film Critics Awards	0	1
OBS Hot Icon Award	1	1
Online Film Critics Society Awards: 1 Nomination	0	1
Palm Springs International Film Festival	1	1
Screen Actors Guild Awards	1	1
Seoul Drama Awards	1	1

Totals (Note: Certain award groups do not simply award one winner. They acknowledge several different recipients, have runners-up, and have third place. Since this is a specific recognition and is different from losing an award, runner-up mentions are considered wins in this award tally. For simplification and to avoid errors, each award in this list has been presumed to have had a prior nomination.)
- Wins: 70
- Nominations: 95

Song Kang-ho (Korean: 송강호; born January 17, 1967) is a South Korean actor. He's widely considered one of the most influential figures in Korean cinema, having starred in a diverse range of critically acclaimed films. In 2020, The New York Times named him one of the greatest actors of the 21st century. He's been recognized four times as Gallup Korea's Film Actor of the Year four times (2013, 2017, 2019 and 2020).

Song gained significant international recognition for his role in Bong Joon-ho's Parasite, a film that won both the Palme d'Or at the Cannes Film Festival and the Academy Award for Best Picture. Song with the rest of the casts shared acting award from Critics' Choice Movie Awards and Screen Actors Guild Awards.

He later made history at the 2022 Cannes Film Festival, becoming the first South Korean actor to win Best Actor and the second South Korean actor after Jeon Do-yeon who won acting award in the festival, for his performance in Hirokazu Kore-eda's Broker.

His numerous accolades also include two Best Actor Award from Fantasia International Film Festival, one Grand Prize and Two Best Actor Awards from Baeksang Arts Awards, four Best Actor Awards from Blue Dragon Film Awards, and Best Actor Awards Grand Bell Awards.

The South Korean government has also twice honored him with the Order of Cultural Merit for his contributions: the Ok-gwan Order in 2019 (after Parasite) and the Bo-gwan Order in 2022 (after Broker). In 2022, he also received The Étoile du Cinéma Award from the French Embassy of South Korea.

== State honors ==
Name of country, award ceremony, year given, and name of honor
Country	Award Ceremony	Year	Honor	Ref.
France	French Night (Note: Held annually by the French Embassy in South Korea in conjunction with the Busan International Film Festival.)	2022	The Étoile du Cinéma Award	
South Korea	Korean Popular Culture and Arts Awards (Note: Honors are given at the Korean Popular Culture and Arts Awards, arranged by the Korea Creative Content Agency and hosted by the Ministry of Culture, Sports and Tourism. They are awarded to those who have contributed to the arts and South Korea's pop culture.)	2022	Bogwan (Precious Crown), 3rd Class	
South Korea	Ministry of Culture, Sports and Tourism (Note: Honour was given due to international success of film Parasite.)	2019	Okgwan Order of Cultural Merit (4th Class)	
South Korea	Miryang City Government	2007	Honorary Citizen	
South Korea	National Tax Service (Note: Honors are given at the Taxpayers' Day ceremony.)	2004	Presidential Commendation	

== Major international award ceremony ==
=== Cannes Film Festival ===
Year	Award ceremony	Nominated artist	Category	Result	Ref.
2022	75th Cannes Film Festival	Best Actor	Broker	Won	

=== Critics' Choice Awards ===
Year	Award ceremony	Nominated artist	Category	Result	Ref.
2020	25th Critics' Choice Awards	Best Acting Ensemble (Note: shared with all casts)	Parasite	Nominated	

=== Screen Actors Guild Awards ===
Year	Award ceremony	Nominated artist	Category	Result	Ref.
2020	26th Screen Actors Guild Awards	Outstanding Performance by a Cast in a Motion Picture	Parasite	Won	

== Other international award ceremony ==
=== AACTA International Awards ===
The Australian Academy of Cinema and Television Arts Awards, known as the AACTA Awards, are presented annually by the Australian Academy of Cinema and Television Arts(AACTA).

Year	Award ceremony	Nominated artist	Category	Result	Ref.
2020	9th AACTA International Awards	Best Supporting Actor	Parasite	Nominated	

=== Asian Film Awards ===
The Asian Film Awards is presented annually by the Hong Kong International Film Festival Society to members of Asian cinema. Song has received one award out of five nominations.

Year	Award ceremony	Nominated artist	Category	Result	Ref.
2007	1st Asian Film Awards	Best Actor	The Host	Won	
2008	2nd Asian Film Awards	Best Actor	Secret Sunshine	Nominated	
2009	3rd Asian Film Awards	Best Actor	The Good, the Bad, the Weird	Nominated	
2010	4th Asian Film Awards	Best Actor	Thirst	Nominated	
2014	8th Asian Film Awards	Best Actor	The Attorney	Nominated	

=== Asia-Pacific Film Festival ===
The Asia-Pacific Film Festival (abbreviated APFF) are presented annually by the Federation of Motion Picture Producers in Asia-Pacific (FPA).

Year	Award ceremony	Nominated artist	Category	Result	Ref.
2013	56th Asia-Pacific Film Festival	Best Supporting Actor	Snowpiercer	Nominated	

=== Asia Pacific Screen Awards ===
The Asia Pacific Screen Awards (APSA) is an international cultural initiative overseen by the Asia Pacific Screen Academy and headquartered in Australia, sometimes called "Asia-Pacific Oscars".

Year	Award ceremony	Nominated artist	Category	Result	Ref.
2016	10th Asia Pacific Screen Awards	Best Actor	The Throne	Nominated	

=== Asian World Film Festival ===
The Asian World Film Festival (AWFF) is an annual film festival based in Los Angeles, California, founded by Kyrgyz filmmaker, Sadyk Sher-Niyaz in 2015. Song has received one award.

Year	Award ceremony	Nominated artist	Category	Result	Ref.
2017	3rd Asian World Film Festival	Special Mention Award	A Taxi Driver	Won	

=== Busan International Film Festival ===
The Busan International Film Festival (BIFF) formerly the Pusan International Film Festival (PIFF), held annually in Haeundae District, Busan, South Korea, is one of the most significant film festivals in Asia. Song has received one award.

Year	Award ceremony	Nominated artist	Category	Result	Ref.
2015	20th Busan International Film Festival	Asia Casting Market Curtain Call Award	—N/a	Won	

=== Deauville Asian Film Festival ===
The Deauville Asian Film Festival (the Festival du film asiatique de Deauville) took place annually in Deauville, France from 1999 to 2014. A film competition was added to the festival in 2000. Song has received one award.

Year	Award ceremony	Nominated artist	Category	Result	Ref.
2001	4th Deauville Asian Film Festival	Best Actor	Joint Security Area	Won	

=== Fantasia Festival ===
Fantasia International Film Festival, also known as Fantasia Fest or simply Fantasia, is an annual film festival founded in 1996 and held primarily in Montreal, Canada. It specializes in genre films, including fantasy, horror, science fiction, and cult cinema, and draws over 100,000 attendees each year. Song has received two awards.

Year	Award ceremony	Nominated artist	Category	Result	Ref.
2007	11th Fantasia Festival	Best Actor	The Show Must Go On	Won	
2017	21st Fantasia Festival	Best Actor	Taxi Driver	Won	

=== Firenze Korea Film Awards ===
The Florence Korea Film Festival, also known as the Firenze Korea Film Awards, is an annual film festival in Florence, Italy, that celebrates Korean cinema. Song has received one award from this festival.

Year	Award ceremony	Nominated artist	Category	Result	Ref.
2024	23rd Firenze Korea Film Awards	Festival Award	Cobweb	Won	

=== Locarno International Film Festival ===
The Locarno International Film Festival is a prominent international film festival held annually in Locarno, Switzerland. Founded in 1946, it is hosted by the Associazione Festival del film Locarno. Song has received one award from this festival.

Year	Award ceremony	Nominated artist	Category	Result	Ref.
2019	72nd Locarno International Film Festival	Excellence Award	Parasite	Won	

=== Los Angeles Film Critics Association ===
The Los Angeles Film Critics Association Award are presented annually by Los Angeles Film Critics Association (LAFCA), an American film critic organization founded in 1975. Song has received one award.

Year	Award ceremony	Nominated artist	Category	Result	Ref.
2019	Los Angeles Film Critics Association Awards	Best Supporting Actor	Parasite	Won	

=== Palm Springs International Film Festival ===
The Palm Springs International Film Festival (PSIFF) is an annual film festival held each January in Palm Springs, California. The festival is run by the Palm Springs International Film Society. Song has received one award from this festival.

Year	Award ceremony	Nominated artist	Category	Result	Ref.
2008	19th Palm Springs International Film Festival	FIPRESCI Best Actor Award	Secret Sunshine	Won	

=== Phoenix Critics Circle Awards ===
The Phoenix Critics Circle Awards are presented annually by The Phoenix Critics Circle (PCC), affiliated with the Phoenix Film Foundation, for the annual Phoenix Film Festival. Song has received one award.

Year	Award ceremony	Nominated artist	Category	Result	Ref.
2020	Phoenix Critics Circle Awards	Best Supporting Actor	Parasite	Won	

=== Seoul International Drama Awards ===
The Seoul International Drama Awards are presented annually by The Seoul Drama Awards Organizing Committee Korean Broadcasters Association. Song has received one award.

Year	Award ceremony	Nominated artist	Category	Result	Ref.
2024	19th Seoul International Drama Awards	Best Actor - International Series	Uncle Samsik	Won	

== Domestic award ceremony ==
=== Baeksang Arts Awards ===
The Baeksang Arts Awards are presented annually by JoongAng Group in the second quarter of each year. Song has received three awards out of thirteen nominations.

Year	Award ceremony	Nominated artist	Category	Result	Ref.
2000	36th Baeksang Arts Awards	Best Actor – Film	The Foul King	Nominated	
2001	37th Baeksang Arts Awards	Best Actor – Film	Joint Security Area	Nominated	
2001	37th Baeksang Arts Awards	Most Popular Actor – Film	Joint Security Area	Won	
2008	44th Baeksang Arts Awards	Best Actor – Film	The Show Must Go On	Nominated	
2009	45th Baeksang Arts Awards	Best Actor – Film	The Good, the Bad, the Weird	Nominated	
2014	50th Baeksang Arts Awards	Grand Prize (Daesang) – Film (Note: A Daesang (Korean: 대상), which translates to "Grand Prize", is the highest honor given out at South Korean award ceremonies.)	The Attorney	Won	
2014	50th Baeksang Arts Awards	Best Actor –Film	The Attorney	Nominated	
2016	52nd Baeksang Arts Awards	Best Actor –Film	The Throne	Nominated	
2017	53rd Baeksang Arts Awards	Best Actor –Film	The Age of Shadows	Won	
2018	54th Baeksang Arts Awards	Grand Prize (Daesang) – Film	A Taxi Driver	Nominated	
2018	54th Baeksang Arts Awards	Best Actor –Film	A Taxi Driver	Nominated	
2020	56th Baeksang Arts Awards	Best Actor –Film	Parasite	Nominated	
2023	59th Baeksang Arts Awards	Best Actor –Film	Broker	Nominated	

=== Blue Dragon Film Awards ===
The Blue Dragon Film Awards are presented annually by Sports Chosun (a sister brand of the Chosun Ilbo) Song has received four awards out of eighteen nominations.

Year	Award ceremony	Nominated artist	Category	Result	Ref.
1997	18th Blue Dragon Film Awards	Best New Actor	No. 3	Nominated	
1997	18th Blue Dragon Film Awards	Best Supporting Actor	No. 3	Won	
2000	21st Blue Dragon Film Awards	Best Actor	Joint Security Area	Nominated	
2002	23rd Blue Dragon Film Awards	Best Actor	Sympathy for Mr. Vengeance	Nominated	
2003	24th Blue Dragon Film Awards	Best Actor	Memories of Murder	Nominated	
2004	25th Blue Dragon Film Awards	Best Actor	The President's Barber	Nominated	
2006	27th Blue Dragon Film Awards	Best Actor	The Host	Nominated	
2007	28th Blue Dragon Film Awards	Best Actor	The Show Must Go On	Won	
2008	29th Blue Dragon Film Awards	Best Actor	The Good, the Bad, the Weird	Nominated	
2009	30th Blue Dragon Film Awards	Best Actor	Thirst	Nominated	
2013	34th Blue Dragon Film Awards	Best Actor	The Face Reader	Nominated	
2014	35th Blue Dragon Film Awards	Best Actor	The Attorney	Won	
2015	36th Blue Dragon Film Awards	Best Actor	The Throne	Nominated	
2016	37th Blue Dragon Film Awards	Best Actor	The Age of Shadows	Nominated	
2017	38th Blue Dragon Film Awards	Best Actor	A Taxi Driver	Won	
2019	40th Blue Dragon Film Awards	Best Actor	Parasite	Nominated	
2022	43rd Blue Dragon Film Awards	Best Actor	Broker	Nominated	
2023	44th Blue Dragon Film Awards	Best Actor	Cobweb	Nominated	

=== Buil Film Awards ===
The Buil Film Awards are presented annually by the Busan Ilbo newspaper. Song has received two awards out of four nominations.

Year	Award ceremony	Nominated artist	Category	Result	Ref.
2014	23rd Buil Film Awards	Best Actor	The Attorney	Won	
2017	26th Buil Film Awards	Best Actor	A Taxi Driver	Won	
2022	31st Buil Film Awards	Best Actor	Broker	Nominated	
2024	33rd Buil Film Awards	Best Actor	Cobweb	Nominated	

=== Busan Film Critics Awards ===
The Busan Film Critics Awards are presented annually by the Busan Film Critics Association (BCFA), a small but independent-minded group of critics based in Busan, South Korea. Each year they announce their choices shortly before the opening of the Busan International Film Festival (BIFF), and a ceremony is then held at the festival to present the prizes. Song has received two awards out of two nominations.

Year	Award ceremony	Nominated artist	Category	Result	Ref.
2000	1st Busan Film Critics Awards	Best Actor	Joint Security Area	Won	
2007	8th Busan Film Critics Awards	Best Actor	The Show Must Go On	Won	

=== Chunsa Film Art Awards ===
The Chunsa Film Art Awards (also known as the Icheon Chunsa Film Festival) are presented annually by the Korea Film Directors' Society since its establishment in 1990. The awards take their name from the pen name of the early Korean actor and filmmaker from the silent film era, Na Woon-gyu. Song has received three awards out of nine nominations.

Year	Award ceremony	Nominated artist	Category	Result	Ref.
2003	11th Chunsa Film Art Awards	Best Actor	Memories of Murder	Won	
2009	17th Chunsa Film Art Awards	Best Actor	Thirst	Won	
2014	19th Chunsa Film Art Awards	Best Actor	The Attorney	Won	
2017	22nd Chunsa Film Art Awards	Best Actor	The Age of Shadows	Nominated	
2018	23rd Chunsa Film Art Awards	Best Actor	A Taxi Driver	Nominated	
2019	24th Chunsa Film Art Awards	Best Actor	Parasite	Nominated	
2020	25th Chunsa Film Art Awards	Best Actor	The King's Letters	Nominated	
2022	27th Chunsa Film Art Awards	Best Actor	Broker	Nominated	
2023	28th Chunsa Film Art Awards	Best Actor	Cobweb	Nominated	

=== Director's Cut Awards ===
The Director's Cut Awards are presented annually by the Korea Film Director's Network (KFDN), a group of approximately 300 Korean filmmakers. Song has received seven awards out of eight nominations.

Year	Award ceremony	Nominated artist	Category	Result	Ref.
2000	3rd Director's Cut Awards	Best Actor	Joint Security Area	Won	
2003	6th Director's Cut Awards	Best Actor	Memories of Murder	Won	
2006	9th Director's Cut Awards	Best Actor	The Host	Won	
2007	10th Director's Cut Awards	Best Actor	Secret Sunshine	Won	
2009	12th Director's Cut Awards	Best Actor	Thirst	Won	
2014	14th Director's Cut Awards	Best Actor	The Attorney	Won	
2019	19th Director's Cut Awards	Best Actor	Parasite	Won	
2024	22nd Director's Cut Awards	Best Actor	Cobweb	Nominated	

=== Grand Bell Awards ===
The Grand Bell Awards, also known as the Daejong Film Awards, is an awards ceremony presented for excellence in film in South Korea. The Grand Bell Awards retains prestige as the oldest continuous film awards held in South Korea, and has been called the Korean equivalent of the American Academy Awards. Song has received five awards out of sixteen nominations.

Year	Award ceremony	Nominated artist	Category	Result	Ref.
1997	35th Grand Bell Awards	Best New Actor	No. 3	Won	
1997	35th Grand Bell Awards	Best Supporting Actor	No. 3	Nominated	
1999	36th Grand Bell Awards	Best Supporting Actor	Shiri	Nominated	
2001	38th Grand Bell Awards	Best Actor	Joint Security Area	Won	
2003	40th Grand Bell Awards	Best Actor	Memories of Murder	Won	
2003	40th Grand Bell Awards	Netizen Popularity Award	Memories of Murder	Won	
2007	44th Grand Bell Awards	Best Actor	The Host	Nominated	
2008	45th Grand Bell Awards	Best Actor	Secret Sunshine	Nominated	
2010	47th Grand Bell Awards	Best Actor	Secret Reunion	Nominated	
2013	50th Grand Bell Awards	Best Actor	The Face Reader	Won	
2014	51st Grand Bell Awards	Best Actor	The Attorney	Nominated	
2016	53rd Grand Bell Awards	Best Actor	The Age of Shadows	Nominated	
2017	54th Grand Bell Awards	Best Actor	A Taxi Driver	Nominated	
2020	56th Grand Bell Awards	Best Actor	Parasite	Nominated	
2022	58th Grand Bell Awards	Best Actor	Broker	Nominated	
2023	59th Grand Bell Awards	Best Actor	Cobweb	Nominated	

=== Golden Cinema Film Festival ===
Golden Cinema Film Festival is a film awards ceremony hosted by Korea Cinematographer's Association. Song has received three award out of three nominations.

Year	Award ceremony	Nominated artist	Category	Result	Ref.
2007	30th Golden Cinematography Awards	Acting Grand Prize (Daesang)	The Host	Won	
2021	40th Golden Cinema Film Festival	Grand Prize (Daesang)	Parasite	Won	
2024	44th Golden Cinema Film Festival	Best Actor	Cobweb	Won	

=== Korean Association of Film Critics Awards ===
The Korean Association of Film Critics Awards, also known as the Critics Choice Awards, isare presented annually by the Korean Association of Film Critics (KAFC). The ceremony is usually held in November.

Year	Award ceremony	Nominated artist	Category	Result	Ref.
1998	18th Korean Association of Film Critics Awards	Best Actor	The Quiet Family	Won	
2003	23rd Korean Association of Film Critics Awards	Best Actor	Memories of Murder	Won	
2007	27th Korean Association of Film Critics Awards	Best Actor	The Show Must Go On	Won	
2013	33rd Korean Association of Film Critics Awards	Best Actor	The Face Reader	Won	
2015	35th Korean Association of Film Critics Awards	Best Actor	The Throne	Nominated	

=== Korean Film Awards ===
The Korean Film Awards was a South Korean film awards ceremony hosted by the broadcasting network MBC from 2002 to 2010. Song has received two awards out of four nominations.

Year	Award ceremony	Nominated artist	Category	Result	Ref.
2002	1st Korean Film Awards	Best Actor	Sympathy for Mr. Vengeance	Nominated	
2003	2nd Korean Film Awards	Best Actor	Memories of Murder	Won	
2007	6th Korean Film Awards	Best Actor	The Show Must Go On	Nominated	
2007	6th Korean Film Awards	Best Actor	Secret Sunshine	Won	
2008	7th Korean Film Awards	Best Actor	The Good, the Bad, the Weird	Nominated	

=== KOFRA Film Awards ===
The KOFRA Film of the Year Award is a film awards ceremony hosted by the Korean Film Journalists Association (KOFRA) from 2009 to 2019. Song has received three awards out of three nominations.

Year	Award ceremony	Nominated artist	Category	Result	Ref.
2010	1st KOFRA Film of the Year Awards	Best Actor	Thirst	Won	
2014	5th KOFRA Film of the Year Awards	Best Actor	The Attorney	Won	
2017	8th KOFRA Film of the Year Awards	Best Actor	The Age of Shadows	Won	

=== Korea Film Actor's Association Awards ===
Korea Film Actor's Association Awards is a film awards ceremony hosted by Korea Film Actor's Association. Song has received two award out of two nominations.

Year	Award ceremony	Nominated artist	Category	Result	Ref.
2013	2013 Korea Film Actor's Association Awards	Movie Top Star Award	Snowpiercer, The Face Reader	Won	
2014	2014 Korea Film Actor's Association Awards	Korea Top Star Award	The Attorney	Won	

=== Other domestic award ===
Year	Award ceremony	Nominated artist	Category	Result	Ref.
2000	5th Women Viewers Film Awards	Best Actor	The Foul King	Won	
2003	1st CGV Audience Choice of the Year Awards	Best Actor	Memories of Murder	Won	
2007	3rd Korea University Film Festival	Best Actor	Secret Sunshine	Won	
2013	OBS Hot Icon Awards (Note: OBS Hot Icon Awards is an entertainment popularity award given by OBS Gyeongin TV since 2013.)	Hot Icon	Snowpiercer, The Attorney	Won	
2016	Shin Young-kyun Arts and Culture Foundation	Grand Prize (Daesang)	—N/a	Won	
2017	17th Korea World Youth Film Festival	Favorite Middle-Aged Actor	A Taxi Driver	Won	
2017	1st The Seoul Awards	Best Actor (Film)	A Taxi Driver	Won	
2017	4th Korean Film Producers Association Awards	Best Actor	A Taxi Driver	Won	

== Accolades from media ==
=== Cine21 ===
Since its 1995 inception, Cine21 has annually presented its Film Awards in the year-end edition of its magazine. This journalistic tradition caps off the year by highlighting the best films, filmmakers, and actors. It's important to note that these awards were published as a special feature, not presented at award ceremony.

Publisher	Year	Listicle	Work	Placement	Ref.
Cine21	2000	Cine21 Award Actor of the Year	The Foul King, Joint Security Area	Won	
Cine21	2003	Cine21 Award Actor of the Year	Memories of Murder	Won	
Cine21	2006	Cine21 Award Actor of the Year	The Host	Won	
Cine21	2007	Cine21 Award Actor of the Year	The Show Must Go On, Secret Sunshine	Won	
Cine21	2009	Cine21 Award Actor of the Year	Thirst	Won	
Cine21	2013	Cine21 Award Actor of the Year	Snowpiercer, The Face Reader, The Attorney	Won	
Cine21	2019	Cine21 Award Actor of the Year	Parasite	Won	
Cine21	2020	Actors that will lead Korean Video Content Industry in 2021	—N/a	6th	
Cine21	2021	Actors that will lead Korean Video Content Industry in 2022	—N/a	6th (Note: mentioned together with Wi Ha-joon, Kim Soo-hyun, Jo Jung-suk, Park Jeong-min, Kim Seon-ho, Ma Dong-seok, Ahn Bo-hyun, Ryu Jun-yeol, Choi Woo-shik)	

=== Max Movie Awards ===
Year	Award	Category	Nominated work	Result	Ref.
2004	1st Max Movie Awards	Best Actor	Memories of Murder	Nominated	
2007	4th Max Movie Awards	Best Actor	The Host	Nominated	
2008	5th Max Movie Awards	Best Actor	Secret Sunshine	Nominated	
2010	7th Max Movie Awards	Best Actor	Thirst	Nominated	
2011	8th Max Movie Awards	Best Actor	Secret Reunion	Nominated	
2014	9th Max Movie Awards	Best Actor	The Attorney	Won	

- 2014–2015, Most Outstanding Male Actor Voted by Audience
- 2011–2012, Korean male actor with the best acting skills

=== Listicles ===
Name of publisher, year listed, name of listicle, and placement
Publisher	Year	Listicle	Placement	Ref.
Gallup Korea	2004	Gallup Korea's Film Actor of the Year	6th	
Gallup Korea	2007	Gallup Korea's Film Actor of the Year	2nd	
Gallup Korea	2008	Gallup Korea's Film Actor of the Year	1st	
Gallup Korea	2009	Gallup Korea's Film Actor of the Year	2nd	
Gallup Korea	2010	Gallup Korea's Film Actor of the Year	5th	
Gallup Korea	2011	Gallup Korea's Film Actor of the Year	7th	
Gallup Korea	2012	Gallup Korea's Film Actor of the Year	Included	
Gallup Korea	2013	Gallup Korea's Film Actor of the Year	1st	
Gallup Korea	2014	Gallup Korea's Film Actor of the Year	2nd	
Gallup Korea	2015	Gallup Korea's Film Actor of the Year	2nd	
Gallup Korea	2016	Gallup Korea's Film Actor of the Year	2nd	
Gallup Korea	2017	Gallup Korea's Film Actor of the Year	1st	
Gallup Korea	2019	Gallup Korea's Film Actor of the Year	1st	
Gallup Korea	2020	Gallup Korea's Film Actor of the Year	1st	
Gallup Korea	2021	Gallup Korea's Film Actor of the Year	4th	
Gallup Korea	2022	Gallup Korea's Film Actor of the Year	3rd	
Gallup Korea	2023	Gallup Korea's Film Actor of the Year	3rd	
The Herald Economy	2006	Pop Culture Power Leader Big 30	4th	
The Herald Economy	2008	Pop Culture Power Leader Big 30	9th	
The Herald Economy	2010	Pop Culture Power Leader Big 30	23rd	
The Herald Economy	2013	Pop Culture Power Leader Big 30	7th (Note: Tied with Ha Jung-woo)	
The Herald Economy	2014	Pop Culture Power Leader Big 30	11th	
The Herald Economy	2015	Pop Culture Power Leader Big 30	10th	
Korea Newspaper Journalists Association	2026	K-Culture 100 Great Koreans Awards	Included	
The New York Times	2020	25 Greatest Actors of the 21st Century	6th	
The Screen	2009	1984–2008 Top Box Office Powerhouse Actors in Korean Movies	2nd	
The Screen	2019	2009–2019 Top Box Office Powerhouse Actors in Korean Movies	3rd	
Sisa Journal	2008	Next Generation Leader — Film Industry	4th	
Sisa Journal	2009	Next Generation Leader — Film Industry	6th	
Sisa Journal	2013	Next Generation Leader — Film Industry	3rd	
Sisa Journal	2013	Most Influential Person — Broadcasting & Entertainment	9th	
Sisa Journal	2015	Next Generation Leader — Pop Culture	5th	
Sisa Journal	2016	Most Influential Celebrity	10th	
Sisa Journal	2017	Next Generation Leader — Culture, Arts, Sports	10th (Note: Tied with Jang Hoone)	
Sisa Journal	2020	Most Influential Person in Broadcasting & Entertainment	7th	
Sisa Journal	2022	Most Influential Person in Broadcasting & Entertainment	4th	
