= List of 2010 box office number-one films in South Korea =

This is a list of films which placed number-one at the South Korean box office during 2010, based on admissions.

== Number-one films ==
| † | This implies the highest-grossing movie of the year. |

| Weekend End Date | Film title | Weekend Admissions | Ref. |
|---|---|---|---|
| 3 January | Avatar † | 1,481,638 | |
| 10 January | Avatar † | 840,111 | |
| 17 January | Avatar † | 722,779 | |
| 24 January | Avatar † | 640,327 | |
| 31 January | Avatar † | 560,367 | |
| 7 February | Secret Reunion | 744,973 | |
| 14 February | Secret Reunion | 726,116 | |
| 21 February | Secret Reunion | 595,633 | |
| 28 February | Secret Reunion | 458,430 | |
| 7 March | Alice in Wonderland | 557,938 | |
| 14 March | Alice in Wonderland | 570,876 | |
| 21 March | Shutter Island | 337,556 | |
| 28 March | Green Zone | 220,598 | |
| 4 April | Clash of the Titans | 929,997 | |
| 11 April | Clash of the Titans | 554,174 | |
| 18 April | Clash of the Titans | 257,107 | |
| 25 April | Bestseller | 216,884 | |
| 2 May | Iron Man 2 | 1,407,002 | |
| 9 May | Iron Man 2 | 679,962 | |
| 16 May | The Housemaid | 662,677 | |
| 23 May | How to Train Your Dragon | 782,296 | |
| 30 May | Prince of Persia: The Sands of Time | 639,843 | |
| 6 June | The Servant | 609,070 | |
| 13 June | The Servant | 408,540 | |
| 20 June | 71: Into the Fire | 814,606 | |
| 27 June | Knight and Day | 471,720 | |
| 4 July | Shrek Forever After | 680,537 | |
| 11 July | The Twilight Saga: Eclipse | 802,512 | |
| 18 July | Moss | 857,130 | |
| 25 July | Inception | 939,316 | |
| 1 August | Salt | 869,653 | |
| 8 August | The Man from Nowhere | 707,177 | |
| 15 August | The Man from Nowhere | 761,188 | |
| 22 August | The Man from Nowhere | 646,848 | |
| 29 August | The Man from Nowhere | 528,091 | |
| 5 September | The Man from Nowhere | 381,756 | |
| 12 September | Troubleshooter | 546,188 | |
| 19 September | A Better Tomorrow | 313,315 | |
| 26 September | Cyrano Agency | 430,632 | |
| 3 October | Cyrano Agency | 283,664 | |
| 10 October | Cyrano Agency | 245,752 | |
| 17 October | Midnight FM | 277,638 | |
| 24 October | Midnight FM | 274,215 | |
| 31 October | The Unjust | 617,386 | |
| 7 November | The Unjust | 457,374 | |
| 14 November | Haunters | 685,670 | |
| 21 November | Haunters | 426,730 | |
| 28 November | Skyline | 427,521 | |
| 5 December | Petty Romance | 469,840 | |
| 12 December | The Chronicles of Narnia: The Voyage of the Dawn Treader | 474,065 | |
| 19 December | Harry Potter and the Deathly Hallows – Part 1 | 815,338 | |
| 26 December | The Yellow Sea | 816,815 | |

== Highest-grossing films ==
Highest-grossing films of 2010 (by admissions)
| Rank | Title | Country | Admissions | Domestic gross |
|---|---|---|---|---|
| 1. | Avatar | United States | 8,151,952 | US$71.8 million |
| 2. | The Man from Nowhere | South Korea | 6,178,248 | US$41.5 million |
| 3. | Inception | United States; United Kingdom | 5,827,444 | US$38.2 million |
| 4. | Secret Reunion | South Korea | 5,416,812 | US$35.4 million |
| 5. | Iron Man 2 | United States | 4,425,003 | US$28.8 million |
| 6. | Jeon Woo-chi: The Taoist Wizard | South Korea | 3,611,472 | US$23.2 million |
| 7. | Moss | South Korea | 3,350,303 | US$22.4 million |
| 8. | 71: Into the Fire | South Korea | 3,330,324 | US$21 million |
| 9. | Harmony | South Korea | 3,018,131 | US$19.1 million |
| 10. | The Servant | South Korea | 2,985,483 | US$19.8 million |

Highest-grossing domestic films of 2010 (by admissions)
| Rank | Title | Admissions | Domestic gross |
|---|---|---|---|
| 1. | The Man from Nowhere | 6,178,248 | US$41.5 million |
| 2. | Secret Reunion | 5,416,812 | US$35.4 million |
| 3. | Jeon Woo-chi: The Taoist Wizard | 3,611,472 | US$23.2 million |
| 4. | Moss | 3,350,303 | US$22.4 million |
| 5. | 71: Into the Fire | 3,330,324 | US$21 million |
| 6. | Harmony | 3,018,131 | US$19.1 million |
| 7. | The Servant | 2,985,483 | US$19.8 million |
| 8. | The Unjust | 2,722,996 | US$18.5 million |
| 9. | Cyrano Agency | 2,684,783 | US$17.5 million |
| 10. | The Housemaid | 2,267,556 | US$15 million |

== See also ==
- List of South Korean films of 2010
