= Kim Jee-woon =

South Korean filmmaker (born 1964)

- Kim in 2026
- Born: July 6, 1964 (age 62); Seoul, South Korea
- Other name: Jiwoon Kim
- Occupations: Film director; screenwriter
- Years active: 1998–present
- Agent: Creative Artists Agency
- Relatives: Kim Ji-sook (sister); Kim Ji-won (brother)
- Honours: Officier de l'Ordre des Arts et des Lettres (2018)

Korean name
- Hangul: 김지운
- Hanja: 金知雲
- RR: Gim Jiun
- MR: Kim Chiun

Kim Jee-woon (Korean: 김지운; born July 6, 1964) is a South Korean film director, screenwriter, and producer. He was a theater actor and playwright before debuting with his self-written and directed film, The Quiet Family in 1998. Kim has worked with increasing levels of success in cinema, showing accomplished acting and a detailed stylization in his films. He is currently one of the most recognized screenwriters/directors in the Korean film industry.

His films A Tale of Two Sisters (2003) and A Bittersweet Life (2005) were both critical and commercial successes. He is also known for the films The Foul King (2000), The Good, the Bad, the Weird (2008), I Saw the Devil (2010), and The Age of Shadows (2016).

== Early life ==
Kim Jee-woon was born on July 6, 1964, in Seoul, South Korea and is the youngest of six siblings. He grew up in Samgak-dong, a neighborhood between present day Jongno and Euljiro. His grandfather was a tailor. When he was young, Kim's father frequently took him to the cinema, where he was exposed to many classic European films. This exposure inspired him to dream of becoming a filmmaker.

In 1983, Kim entered the Department of theater at Seoul Institute of the Arts. After dropping out of school, Kim stayed in Paris for three months in 1991 and watched about 100 films during Cahiers du Cinéma's 40th anniversary film festival. Kim built up his career in the field by writing and directing several plays, including Hot Sea (1994) and Movie Movie (1995). He also acted onstage in the musical Guys and Dolls (1983) and Anton Chekhov's play The Seagull.

== Career ==
=== Debut as screenwriter and director (1994–2002) ===
Kim began his film career as assistant director for Lee Sung-soo's 1994 film The Young Lover. In 1996, Kim started his career as a screenwriter by chance, because he was in a car accident and had to pay for the repairs, which amounted to KRW 6 million ($5,300). Kim won a competition in the movie magazine Premiere with his script entitled Wonderful Seasons.

In 1997, Kim went to a ramen shop, and the lady owner used Cine21 magazine instead of a tray. The magazine had an advertisement about the 1st Cine21 Screenplay Contest stating it was a week before the deadline. Kim wrote a film script entitled The Quiet Family, and won first prize. The screenplay went into several film production companies, but couldn't find the right director. Eventually, Kim got the opportunity to direct his first feature film, The Quiet Family (1998), a horror/drama/comedy about a family who owns a mountain inn and whose guests continue to commit suicide. The film was his first collaboration with actors Choi Min-sik and Song Kang-ho. The film won Best Live Action film at the 1999 Fantasporto film festival, and Best Director and Best Film at the Malaga International Week of Fantastic Cinema. It was also nominated for Best Film at the 1998 Sitges - Catalan International Film Festival.

In 2000, Kim directed and wrote his second feature film, The Foul King (2000), which reunited him with Song Kang-ho. The film follows an unproductive and incompetent bank clerk (played by Song Kang-ho) who escapes his demanding, alpha-male boss by entering the pro-wrestling ring and fighting under a pseudonym, "The Foul King." The two worlds eventually end up colliding. Song Kang-ho mentioned that the film The Foul King (2000) is his personal favorite. The film won Best Director at the 2001 Milan International Film Festival and an Audience Award at the Udine Far East Film Festival.

In 2001, Kim directed and wrote a short film entitled Coming Out (2001). The film is about vampires, among other things, and Kim wrote and directed Coming Out as part of a project to distribute three digital short films online. It was also commissioned by venture group Media 4M, and the project also included shorts by Jang Jin and Ryu Seung-wan. Coming Out was shot with a Canon XL-1 camcorder during a time when digital filmmaking in South Korea was still in its infancy, and it went on to inspire many other digital productions. It was shown at the Fantasia Festival and the Puchon International Fantastic Film Festival in 2001, and the Thessaloniki International Film Festival in 2005. Coming Out was also included as a special feature on the UK DVD release of The Quiet Family, and a review at DVDActive praised it as "delicate, cerebral and contemporary cinema at its most profound."

Kim next wrote and directed the "Memories" segment in the omnibus film, Three (also known as Three Extremes II), also featuring segments directed by Peter Chan and Nonzee Nimibutr. The segment starred Kim Hye-soo.

=== Career breakthrough (2003–2010) ===
"The horror film A Tale of Two Sisters (2002) is a fresh and mesmerizing take on the Korean traditional folktale about two sisters, Jang-hwa and Hong-nyeon. It was touted as a work of both horror and artistic sophistication and was a huge box office hit. A Tale of Two Sisters was also successful internationally, with Hollywood buying the rights to remake the film. With its superb mise-en-scène and film score, A Tale of Two Sisters brings Kim Jee-woon's distinctive style to the fore."

— Curator—Shim Seul-ki, Korean Film Archive

Kim wrote and directed A Tale of Two Sisters (2003), an adaptation of a Joseon Dynasty era folktale called Janghwa Hongryeon jeon. The original Korean folktale featured two sisters named Janghwa and Hongryeon (Rose Flower and Red Lotus). However, in the film, the sisters were named Su-mi (played by Im Soo-jung) and Su-yeon (played by Moon Geun-young), which still carried the same meaning of Rose and Lotus. A Tale of Two Sisters, released in-between the aforementioned hits of 2003, was the third highest-grossing film after Memories of Murder, and only about 150,000 tickets short of Oldboy's initial run of 3,260,000 admissions. It held of record the highest-grossing South Korean horror film for several years.

The film received numerous awards at various film festivals, including the Fant-Asia Film Festival (most popular film), Best Actress (Im Soo-jung), Best Director and Best Film at the Fantasporto, Best Picture at Screamfest Horror Film Festival, Grand Prize and the Youth Jury Grand Prize at the Gerardmer Film Festival, and acting awards for Im Soo-jung and Yum Jung-ah at the Blue Dragon Film Awards and the Brussels International Fantastic Film Festival. The movie was later remade into the 2009 U.S. film The Uninvited, starring Emily Browning, with Kim receiving an original story/writer credit.

In 2005, Kim wrote and directed A Bittersweet Life (2005), his first collaboration with actor Lee Byung-hun (whom he would later work with in The Good, the Bad, the Weird and I Saw the Devil). The film was an ultra-stylish and ultra-violent gangster and mobster picture that was both a critical and commercial success in South Korea. The film was released theatrically in South Korea on April 1, 2005. It opened on 265 screens throughout the country, and registered a total of 1,112,950 admissions by the end of its run. Lee Byung-hun won Best Actor at the Baeksang Arts Awards and Hwang Jung-min won a Best Supporting Actor award at Korea's Grand Bell Awards. Kim also won the "Action Asia Award" at the 2006 Deauville Asian Film Festival.

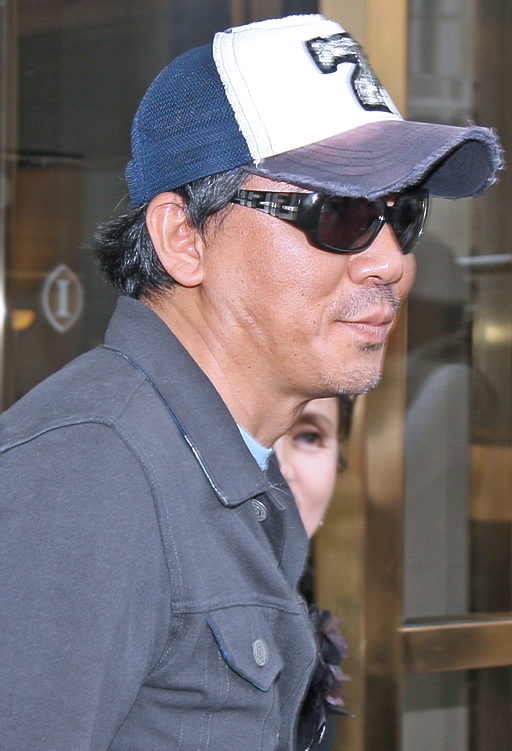
Kim at 2008 TIFF

In 2008, Kim wrote and directed The Good, the Bad, the Weird (2008), his tribute to Sergio Leone's western action film The Good, the Bad and the Ugly (1966). He re-teamed again with Song Kang-ho (who played "The Weird") as well as Lee Byung-hun (who played "The Bad") in the film. The film takes place in 1930s Manchuria and chronicles the struggles of the three main characters in trying to find a piece of treasure. The film won an Achievement in Cinematography Award from the 2008 Asia Pacific Screen Awards, won Best Supporting Actor for Jung Woo-sung (the "Good") at the 2009 Asian Film Awards, and won Best Director and Best Special Effects at the 2008 Sitges - Catalan International Film Festival.

In 2010, Kim directed, based on a screenplay from Park Hoon-jung, the thriller I Saw the Devil, the first time Kim directed a film from a script by someone else. Choi Min-sik, who played the serial killer, came to him with the script. Kim's first impression of the script was it felt very new and powerful, with a brutal and tough side to it, which got him interested. Kim thought one of the most important things was to find the right antagonist for Choi's character. He met Lee Byung-hun whom he worked with previously on The Good, the Bad, the Weird in a festival and he agreed to headline the film.

The Korea Media Rating Board forced Kim to re-cut the film for its theatrical release, objecting to its violent content. The film received a "Restricted" rating twice, preventing any sort of release in theatres or on home video and promotions as well. Seven cuts were made with the total runtime of removed material between eighty and ninety seconds. The film was finally released in South Korean Cinemas on August 12, 2010. On November 3, 2010, Kim attended the London Korean Film Festival to introduce the restored version of I Saw The Devil. It also received screenings at several other international film festivals, including the Fantasporto Film Festival, Toronto International Film Festival, Sitges Film Festival, and San Sebastian Film Festival.

The film won a number of awards, including Best Director and Best Film at Fantasporto, Special Jury Prize, Audience Award, Critics Award at the Gerardmer Film Festival, Best Lighting at the Grand Bell Awards, Best Foreign Language film from the Austin Film Critics Association and Best Editing from the 2011 Asian Film Awards.

In 2006, Kim directed and wrote the segment known as "The Heavenly Creature" about a robot who achieves enlightenment in a Buddhist temple, in 2012 omnibus film Doomsday Book (Yim Pil-sung directed the other two segments). The film won Best International Film at the Fantasia Festival and a Special Award at the Toronto After Dark Film Festival.

=== US debut and recent works (2010–2018) ===
In 2010, Kim was hired as director for US film The Last Stand, which was produced by Lorenzo di Bonaventura and Lionsgate Films. The company had acquired Andrew Knauer's spec script for The Last Stand in June 2009, prior to Kim's involvement. According to di Bonaventura, Kim was brought on board because of his ability to elevate simple concepts and make them feel more rich in his previous works. Kim himself expressed interest in the film's storyline of protecting something valuable, no matter how small, and the idea of using old-fashioned methods to take down advanced technology. In addition, screenwriter Jeffrey Nachmanoff was hired to revise the script. According to di Bonaventura, the film had a Western movie vibe, featuring a small town besieged by a villainous figure similar to a corrupt cattle baron, with a seasoned veteran attempting to thwart his plans.

In 2011, Lionsgate offered Arnold Schwarzenegger the lead role in The Last Stand, after initially considering Liam Neeson for the part. The Last Stand marked Schwarzenegger's return to acting after having just ended his tenure as Governor of California. This was Arnold Schwarzenegger's first lead acting role since Terminator 3: Rise of the Machines in 2003. The announcement of Schwarzenegger's casting in The Last Stand was made in July 2011. The actor stated that he found the project to be "quite different" from his previous roles, despite being action-packed, as he had to portray a character who was sensitive to his team and shared humorous moments similar to True Lies. Initially, Kim was hesitant to cast such a prominent star in the film, but after discussing the character of Ray Owens with Schwarzenegger, they both agreed on portraying him as an everyman rather than having a "Terminator-like feel." The film also starred Johnny Knoxville, Forest Whitaker, Peter Stormare and Daniel Henney. Two weeks later, Lionsgate announced a release date of January 18, 2013.

"[...] Kim Jee-woon is a person who creates very creative shots. He came up with a lot of ideas even though his on-site schedule was tight, and his instantaneous and intuitive judgments were excellent. In fact, at first, he was very worried about communication problems with him, but it didn't really matter once he started filming."

— Arnold Schwarzenegger, Cine21' interview

Filming for The Last Stand began on October 17, 2011, in Belen, New Mexico and Nevada. The movie follows a small town sheriff and his deputies as they try to stop a drug lord from fleeing to Mexico in a modified sports car. Belen was ultimately chosen as the filming location for its abandoned area that could be used by the production company for as long as they needed it. Production designer Franco-Giacomo Carbone filled six vacant lots with façades that incorporated a mixture of styles to heighten the appearance of a frontier city with much history. Two existing buildings in Belen became landmarks of Sommerton: the local hotel and a condemned building that became the diner. While the producers initially wanted to film in Downtown Las Vegas, they found that downtown Albuquerque offered a visually similar location and opted to film there instead. The Las Vegas Strip was later added in post-production. Filming in Belen did not interfere with local businesses, as the town allowed filming from 6 p.m. to 6 a.m. Kim aimed to create distinct looks for each space, with the FBI environment having cold tones and Sommerton having warm colors to enhance its peaceful small town feeling.

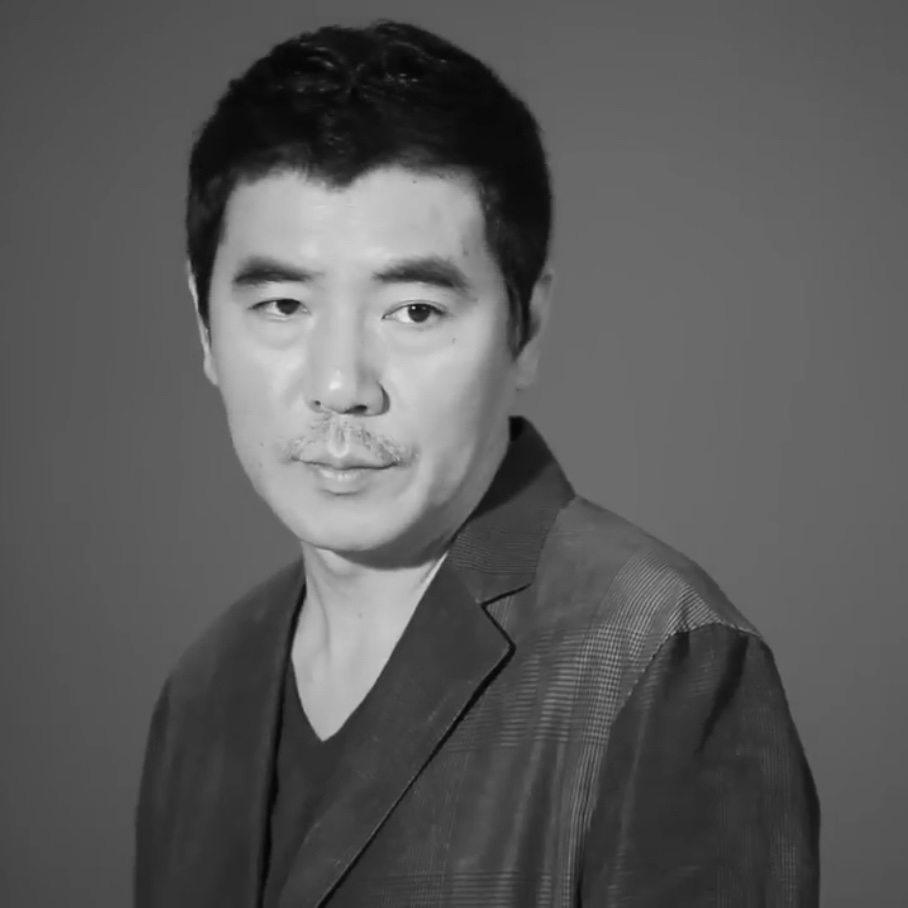
Kim in 2013

In October 2013, it was reported that Kim would direct the film adaptation of Ed Brubaker's pulp crime comic Coward. However, this project did not come to fruition. After his debut in the US, Kim returned to Korea.

In the same year, Kim premiered his short film The X in the Gala Presentation category at the Busan International Film Festival. Kim filmed The X using Korea's new multi-projection technology, ScreenX. ScreenX technology expands the movie's display onto the sidewalls of the theater, allowing certain scenes to wrap around the audience by capturing them in 270 degrees. In addition to this visual technology, SoundX was also created to enhance the overall experience by conveying a more immersive sense of space and distance. These innovative creations enable viewers to be fully surrounded, and in addition, they offer exciting new narrative possibilities for filmmakers.

In 2014, Kim was honored at the Gérardmer Film Festival, where his previous works had also been recognized. He had previously received the Grand Prize in 2004 for A Tale of Two Sisters (2003), as well as the Critics' Prize and Audience Prize in 2011 for I Saw the Devil (2010).

On August 3, 2015, it was announced that Warner Bros. would finance and distribute its first ever Korean-language 1930s set drama Secret Agent, and the $8.62 million budgeted film would also be produced by Grimm Pictures. The project and script was developed by Lee Jin-sook, which Kim Jee-woon would direct, and the cast would be Song Kang-ho and Gong Yoo. A trailer was released on July 14, 2016, revealing the new title as The Age of Shadows. On August 30, 2016, The Korean Film Council (KOFIC) announced that The Age of Shadows had been selected as South Korea's official entry for the best foreign-language film category at the 89th Academy Awards.

From 2017 to 2018, Kim filmed the science fiction action film Illang: The Wolf Brigade, which is a remake of the 1999 anime film Jin-Roh: The Wolf Brigade Featured a star-studded cast that includes Gang Dong-won, Han Hyo-joo, Jung Woo-sung, Kim Mu-yeol and Choi Min-ho, the film was released in the summer of 2018. The production cost was 19 billion won (US$17.04 million), and it was distributed by Warner Bros. Korea. Although it received mixed reviews and underperformed at the domestic box office, selling around 897,000 tickets against its break-even point of six million tickets, it competed for the Golden Shell at the San Sebastián International Film Festival, making it the second South Korean film to do so. Netflix also acquired the international distribution rights for the film.

=== Venture into streaming series and international collaboration (2019–present) ===
"There's a different kind of pressure when you're working on a TV series because films are mostly two hours long, whereas for TV series, this one was six hours long," says Kim. "I wanted to make sure that each episode told a complete story in itself, while hooking the audience to watch the following episode. I had to be extra careful and more creative with building the plot."

— Kim Jee-woon Forbes' interview

In May 2019, YG Entertainment's drama production subsidiary YG Studioplex announced that Kim would direct the company's adaptation of the Daum webtoon Dr. Brain, created by Hongjacga. In October 2020, several Korean news outlets reported that the adaptation had been picked up by Apple TV+, making it their first Korean language original series. Titled Dr. Brain, the sci-fi thriller consists of six episodes and was scheduled November 4, 2021, to coincide with the launch of Apple TV+ in South Korea. Lee Sun-kyun starred as Sewon Koh, a brain scientist, in a film where he attempts to unravel his family's mysterious deaths by accessing his deceased wife Jaeyi Jung's (played by Lee Yoo-young) memories through advanced technology. Later, in September 2022, Lee Sun-kyun earned a nomination for Best Performance by an Actor at the International Emmy Awards, making him the second Korean actor to be recognized in this category, following Jang Hyuk's nomination in 2011 for The Slave Hunters.

In celebration of 100 years of Korean cinema, Kim's The Foul King was selected as one of 18 films for the 7th Korean Film Festival in Brussels from October 31 to November 9, 2019.

In February 2022, it was revealed that Kim would team up for the fifth time with Song Kang-ho for his upcoming film Cobweb. The movie, which features an ensemble cast that includes Im Soo-jung, Oh Jung-se, Jeon Yeo-been and Krystal Jung, was written by Shin Yeon-shick. Cobweb is the first project of Anthology Studios, co-founded by Kim, Song and Choi Jae-won and was acquired by JTBC Studios in early 2021. In the following year, the film was invited to be part of the out-of-competition section of the 76th Cannes International Film Festival, which was held in May 2023.

In September 2022, it was reported that Kim has teamed with Star Trek: Discovery writers Bo-yeon Kim and Erika Lippoldt to develop a new series about a Korean family immigrating to the U.S. They collaborated in the untitled project with eOne, the studio behind series such as Showtime's Yellowjackets and ABC's The Rookie franchise. On December 7, 2022, at the 'Yong Film Night' event, it was announced that Kim will co-direct an OTT series with the tentative title Mangnaein, alongside young director Park Bo-ram. The series is an adaptation of the crime novel Second Sister by Hong Kong writer Chan Ho Kei. Yong Film is producing the series in collaboration with Anthology Studio and SK Global.

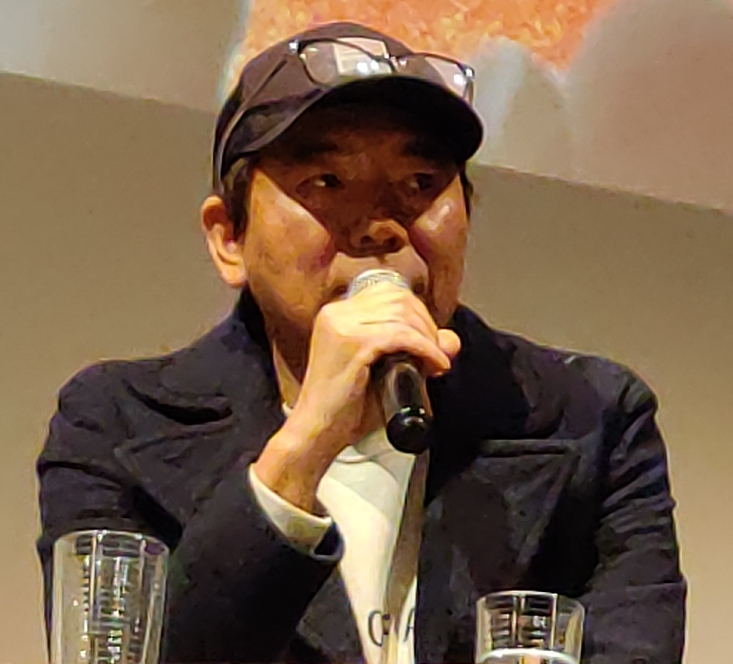
Kim in 2023

In April 2023, Kim signed with Creative Artists Agency. The following month, May 2023, reports emerged of Kim and Choi Jae-won of Anthology Studio collaborating with Kumar Mangat Pathak's Mumbai-based Panorama Studios on a Korean-language remake of India's Drishyam franchise. Later, in September 2023, Kim participated in the 10th Prada Mode exhibition, 'Multiple and Parallel,' alongside director Yeon Sang-ho and Jeong Da-hee. Curator Lee Sook-kyung invited them to share stories about Seoul, focusing on themes of gastronomy, absence, and death, with the exhibition's title reflecting how different sensibilities create parallel universes. Held at Insadong Court (KOTE) on September 5 and 6, Kim's installation, 'The Faint Shadow of Old Love,' utilized 'the ordinary' as its subject.

In April 2024, Kim was reported as set to direct The Hole, an adaptation of the thriller novel with the same name. The feature will star Theo James, Jung Ho-yeon, Yeom Hye-ran, and Christian Slater. The plot follows James' character, a successful American professor and writer in South Korea, who, after a car accident that killed his wife, is bedridden and cared for by his Korean mother-in-law, who begins to uncover truths about their marriage. Produced by Anthology Studios, K. Period Media, and Esmail Corp., with Department M and Medan financing and serving as executive producers. CAA Media Finance, UTA Independent Film Group, and The Veterans brokered the deal; the former two co-represent U.S. rights, while The Veterans handles international. In May 2025, Orion acquired worldwide distribution right.

In July 2025, Kim was appointed dean of The CHANEL X BIFF ASIAN FILM ACADEMY, with Mattie Do named Directing Mentor and Park Jung-hoon joining as Cinematography Mentors. The 2025 academy received a record 625 applications from 40 countries, showing the highest national diversity since its 2005 inception. Applications and selections from female filmmakers, alongside interest from Pakistan and China, also significantly increased from the previous year. Participants will undergo a 20-day intensive training and mentoring program from September 7 to 26, producing eight short films set to premiere at the 30th Busan International Film Festival.

In September 2025, Kim will produce a remake of the Indian film, Drishyam.

== Filmmaking ==
=== Style ===
Kim is recognized for his ability to push the boundaries of various film genres. He has written and directed films that span a wide range of genres, including horror, comedy, sci-fi, noir, western, and spy thrillers. Rather than relying on a formulaic approach, Kim's filmmaking involves exploring a diverse array of eras, styles, and genres with impressive proficiency.

Kim is a filmmaker known for his meticulous attention to detail and processes, much like a watchmaker. Kim's directing techniques are characterized by smooth camerawork and his use of classic colors, lighting effects, and rich architectural set design, which are prominent features of his visual storytelling. His background in directing plays before entering Chungmuro has earned him a reputation for having a theatrical style, which is evident in his dialogue-heavy comedies. These comedies also feature numerous visual gags that creatively employ camera techniques and editing.

One of the defining characteristics of Kim's work is his staging of action sequences. He has a reputation for creating intense and realistic action scenes that are both visually stunning and emotionally impactful. His ability to choreograph complex fight scenes and chases, as well as his use of practical effects and stunts, has earned him a reputation as one of the most skilled action directors in the industry. Additionally, Kim is renowned for his affinity for graphic violence, which makes even his famous compatriots Bong Joon-ho and Park Chan-wook pale in comparison.

Despite the visceral nature of his action scenes, one of the hallmarks of Kim's storytelling is his affinity to create lonely, alienated and solitary characters. He often explores the psychological motivations of his characters, delving deep into their inner worlds to reveal their fears, desires, and vulnerabilities. This allows him to create stories that are not only thrilling and action-packed but also emotionally resonant and thought-provoking.

Furthermore, Kim places great emphasis on the DVD releases of his films and goes to great lengths to package them with extensive documentary materials and revealing commentary tracks.

=== Influences ===
Kim's films are known for their intricate visual design, which is not derived from his personal background. Instead, he draws inspiration from other celebrated filmmakers whom he admires. While Kim admires many directors, he has stated that French filmmaker Robert Bresson is the most respected among them. However, critics have noted that Kim's films are quite different from Bresson's style."

Kim has mentioned on multiple occasions that he was inspired and influenced by the works of French auteur Jean-Pierre Melville, whose films he watched as a child. Kim has also referred to his film A Bittersweet Life was a Koreanized Melville. In regards to Melville's influence on his filmmaking, Kim identifies two key takeaways. Firstly, he attempts to convey the futility of life through his films by adopting a cynical and detached approach to expose this vanity. Secondly, he draws inspiration from Melville's indirect and oblique narrative style, attempting to replicate the weight of atmosphere, the meaningful presence and absence of light, and the body language of actors to convey meaning without relying on dialogue. In essence, Kim seeks to emulate Melville's ability to speak without words, both in terms of expression and deeper meaning.

In addition, Kim expresses his admiration for the films of the Coen Brothers and Quentin Tarantino, noting their tendency to incorporate allusions and references to other directors and films. While the visual style of A Bittersweet Life is largely influenced by Melville, Kim drew inspiration from Quentin Tarantino's film Kill Bill and Brian De Palma's film Scarface for action sequences, particularly the final gunfight.

Sergio Leone's Spaghetti Western films, particularly The Good, the Bad and the Ugly, also had profound impact on Kim's work. Kim made tribute with his own "Kimchi Western" film The Good, the Bad, the Weird, which can be viewed as a Korean take on the Western genre. The film combines elements of the Korean Manchuria-Western sub-genre, which emerged in the 1960s and early 1970s, with elements of the Western genre.

Kim took inspiration from David Fincher's Zodiac when shaping the visual style of his film I Saw the Devil. He specifically incorporated the muted colors and contrast used in Zodiac to capture the mood of the time period. This approach differed from Kim's previous films, which often featured vibrant colors and high contrast. By emulating the Zodiac style, Kim aimed to achieve a more realistic look. The resulting dark tones were no longer flat black, but appeared hazy or grey, creating a creepy atmosphere that set the film apart from Kim's earlier works.

With The Age of Shadows, Kim stated that it began as a chilly spy film, and he drew inspiration from foreign classics such as Tinker Tailor Soldier Spy, The Third Man, and The Spy Who Came in from the Cold. However, he soon realized that his film differed significantly from these movies, as they depicted conflicts between Western cultures and powers during the first and second World Wars. In contrast, The Age of Shadows centers on the sacrifices and struggles of individuals fighting for their own nation, imbuing it with a sense of desperate emotion that intensifies as the narrative progresses. As a result, what began as a cold spy film became a more impassioned and heated work.

=== Collaborators ===
"When I first saw Song Kang-ho, I felt he was a bit nerdy. Regardless of whether he is good at acting or not, he has a very instinctive and animal feeling. He tends to take a lot of former actors. What I mean is, he's the sum of what comes out accidentally. I look for the kind of tension he gives, and the rupture that happens accidentally in it. At the same time, he wondered if he would be able to create a unique collaboration. In the case of the two directors, the continuity is so strong... (Laughter) There is a certainty about the character. If you continued to express it with sincerity, would you say I'm looking for a sense of excitement? It's not common, but I think it enriches the person's character when viewed as a whole. I tend to look for images that make me feel more alive and raw."

— Kim Jee-woon about Song Kang-ho, Vogue Magazine

Kim Jee-woon places immense importance on the roles of cinematographer and artistic director in film production. He has formed several long-lasting partnerships and close collaborations with talented professionals in these fields. For instance, he worked extensively with cinematographer Lee Mo-gae particularly on A Tale of Two Sisters (2003), The Good, the Bad, the Weird (2008), I Saw the Devil (2010), and Illang: The Wolf Brigade. Similarly, Kim collaborated with cinematographer Kim Ji-yong on A Bittersweet Life (2005), The Last Stand (2013), and The Age of Shadows (2016).

Kim has also developed a productive partnership with music director Mowg, beginning with their first collaboration on the omnibus film Doomsday Book (started in 2006, released in 2012). They went on to work together on several other projects, including I Saw the Devil (2010), The Last Stand (2013), One Perfect Day (short film 2013), The X (short film 2013), The Age of Shadows (2016), Illang: The Wolf Brigade (2018), Untact (short film 2020), and Dr. Brain (2021).

He also worked three times with Music director Dalpalan in Three... Extremes, A Bittersweet Life, and The Good, the Bad, the Weird.

Furthermore, Kim has a talent for attracting top-tier acting talents. Some of Korea's most well-known stars, such as Choi Min-sik and Song Kang-ho, have been integral parts of his casting selection. Song Kang-ho, in particular, has appeared in five of Kim's feature length films, and Kim considers him a partner in his filmmaking endeavors. In addition to Song, other actors who have appeared in at least two of his films are Choi Min-sik, Lee Byung-hun, Jung Woo-sung, Kim Kap-soo and Im Soo-jung.

Recurring casts
Actor Work	Choi Min-sik	Go Ho-kyung	Im Soo-jung	Jeon Yeo-been	Jung Woong-in	Jung Woo-sung	Kim Kap-soo	Kim Mu-yeol	Lee Byung-hun	Lee Ki-young	Oh Dal-soo	Song Kang-ho	Song Young-chang
The Quiet Family	check	check			check					check		check	
The Foul King		check			check							check	check
A Tale of Two Sisters			check				check						
A Bittersweet Life									check	check	check		
The Good, the Bad, the Weird						check			check		check	check	check
I Saw the Devil	check						check		check				
Doomsday Book								check					check
The Age of Shadows				check					check			check	
Illang: The Wolf Brigade				check		check		check					
Cobweb			check	check		check						check	

== Philanthropy ==
Kim Jee-woon donated his entire modeling fee from Japanese Sony Bravia to VANK, a cyber diplomatic mission. According to Park Ki-tae, the general manager of VANK, on August 12, 2008, Kim made the donation as a way to show his appreciation for the support he received for The Good, the Bad, the Weird. The donation was used for the 'Dokdo Keeper' cause.

== Filmography ==
=== Feature films ===
Key
†	Denotes films that have not yet been released

"I don't think it's possible to predict the future. But I just want to keep making movies as long as they exist."

— Kim Jee-woon

Kim Jee-won feature film credits
Year	Title		Credited as			Ref.
Year	English	Korean	Director	Writer	Producer	Ref.
1998	The Quiet Family	조용한 가족	Yes	Yes	No	
2000	The Foul King	반칙왕	Yes	Yes	No	
2003	A Tale of Two Sisters	장화, 홍련	Yes	Yes	No	
2005	A Bittersweet Life	달콤한 인생	Yes	Yes	No	
2008	The Good, the Bad, the Weird	좋은 놈, 나쁜 놈, 이상한 놈	Yes	Yes	Yes	
2010	I Saw the Devil	악마를 보았다	Yes	No	No	
2013	The Last Stand		Yes	No	No	
2016	The Age of Shadows	밀정	Yes	No	Yes	
2018	Illang: The Wolf Brigade	인랑	Yes	Yes	No	
2023	Cobweb	거미집	Yes	No	No	
2027	The Hole †	더홀	Yes	—N/a	—N/a	

=== Short films ===
"It is certainly true that for most directors there are great difficulties in getting short films screened in Korea. However, as many of my shorts have been made as part of larger projects and most have come on the back of releases of my feature-length films, I have had no real difficulties by comparison. Perhaps my fame has played a part on its own too, but of course I won't say it has (Kim Jee-woon laughs)."

— Kim Jee-woon in Interview with Hangul Celluloid

Kim Jee-won short film credits
Year	Title		Credited as		Ref.
Year	English	Original	Director	Writer	Ref.
2000	Coming Out	커밍 아웃	Yes	Yes	
2002	Three – "Memories"	쓰리; Thai: อารมณ์ อาถรรพณ์ อาฆาต; Chinese: 三更	Yes	Yes	
2011	60 Seconds of Solitude in Year Zero (Note: 2011 anthology film, a collection of one-minute short films created by 60 filmmakers from around the world on the theme of the death of cinema.)		Yes	Yes	
2012	Doomsday Book – "The Heavenly Creature"	인류멸망보고서 – "천상의 피조물"	Yes	Yes	
2013	One Perfect Day	사랑의 가위바위보	Yes	Yes	
2013	The X	더 엑스	Yes	Yes	
2020	Live Your Strength (Note: Lancôme short film)	내 물건이 너의 집에 남아있다면 헤어진 게 아니다	Yes	Yes	
2020	Untact (Note: Samsung Short film)	언택트	Yes	Yes	

=== Series ===
Key
†	Denotes television productions that have not yet been released

Kim Jee-won series credits
Year	Title		Credited as			Ref.
Year	English	Korean	Director	Writer	Producer	Ref.
2021	Dr. Brain	Dr. 브레인	Yes	Yes	Executive	
2026	Unfriend †	언프렌디	Co-director (Note: with Park Bo-ram)	Co-writing (Note: with scriptwriterJoo Won-gyu)	No	

== Theater ==
Kim Jee-won theater credits
Year	Title		Credited as			Ref.
Year	English	Korean	Director	Writer	Producer	Ref.
1987	Scraps	찌꺼기들	Assistant Director	No	No	
1995	Hot Sea	뜨거운 바다	Yes	No	No	
1995	Movie, Movie	무비, 무비	Yes	No	No	

== Art exhibition ==
Kim Jee-won art exhibition credits
Year	Title		Credited as	Venue	Date	Ref.
Year	English	Korean	Credited as	Venue	Date	Ref.
2023	Multiple and Parallel: The Pain Shadow of an Old Love	다중과 평행 : 희미한 옛사랑의 그림자	Installation artist	Insadong Court (KOTE) in Seoul	September 5 and 6	

== Publications ==
Published books
Year	Title		Author	Publisher	Published Date	ISBN	Ref.
Year	English	Korean	Author	Publisher	Published Date	ISBN	Ref.
2006	Shortcut by Kim Ji-woon	김지운의 숏컷	Kim Jee-woon	Mindwalk	2006-11-30	978-8-9609-0000-4	
2008	Shortcut by Kim Ji-woon	김지운의 숏컷	Kim Jee-woon	Mindwalk	2008-01-15	978-8-9609-0042-4	
2010	The Good, The Bad, The Weird; The Basic	좋은놈, 나쁜놈, 이상한놈_베이직	Kim Jee-woon	All That Story	2010-05-18	ECN: 0102-2018-800-002606343	
2011	Movie of My Life	내 인생의 영화	Kim Jee-woon	Cine21 Books	2011-07-12	978-8-9843-1484-9	

== Accolades ==
=== Awards and nominations ===
Awards and nominations of Kim Jee-woon
Year	Award	Category	Nominee(s)	Result	Ref.
1999	19th FantaSporto International Film Festival	International Fantasy Film Award	The Quiet Family	Won	
2000	Málaga International Week of Fantastic Cinema	Best Film	The Quiet Family	Won	
2000	Málaga International Week of Fantastic Cinema	Best Director	The Quiet Family	Won	
2000	Blue Dragon Film Awards	Best Film	The Foul King	Nominated	
2001	2001 Milan International Film Festival	Best Director	The Foul King	Won	
2001	3rd Far East Film Festival	Audience Award	The Foul King	Won	
2003	The 4th Busan Film Critics Awards	Special Jury Award	A Tale of Two Sisters	Won	
2003	Sitges International Fantastic Film Festival	Best Film	A Tale of Two Sisters	Nominated	
2003	Screamfest Horror Film Festival	Best Director	A Tale of Two Sisters	Won	
2003	Screamfest Horror Film Festival	Crystal Skull Award	A Tale of Two Sisters	Won	
2004	23rd Brussels International Fantastic Film Festival	Silver Crow Award	A Tale of Two Sisters	Won	
2004	11th Gérardmer International Fantastic Film Festival	the Grand Prize	A Tale of Two Sisters	Won	
2004	11th Gérardmer International Fantastic Film Festival	the Youth Jury Grand Prize	A Tale of Two Sisters	Won	
2004	Fantasia International Film Festival	Most Popular Film	A Tale of Two Sisters	Won	
2004	24th FantaSporto International Film Festival	International Fantasy Film Award	A Tale of Two Sisters	Won	
2004	24th FantaSporto International Film Festival	Best Director Award	A Tale of Two Sisters	Won	
2004	24th FantaSporto International Film Festival	the Orient Express Section Special Jury Award	A Tale of Two Sisters	Won	
2005	The 25th Korean Association of Film Critics Awards	Top 10 Film Awards	A Bittersweet Life	Won	
2005	Sitges International Fantastic Film Festival	Best Motion Pictures	A Bittersweet Life	Nominated	
2006	8th Deauville Asian Film Festival, France	Action Asia Award	A Bittersweet Life	Won	
2006	10th Fantasia Film Festival	Silver Award	A Bittersweet Life	Won	
2008	29th Blue Dragon Film Awards	Best Director	The Good, The Bad, The Weird	Won	
2008	29th Blue Dragon Film Awards	Most Popular Film	The Good, The Bad, The Weird	Won	
2008	29th Blue Dragon Film Awards	Best Film	The Good, The Bad, The Weird	Nominated	
2008	Cine21 Film Award	Best Director of The Year	The Good, The Bad, The Weird	Won	
2008	41st Sitges Film Festival	Best Director	The Good, The Bad, The Weird	Won	
2008	41st Sitges Film Festival	Official Fantastic Best Special Effects Award	The Good, The Bad, The Weird	Won	
2008	28th Hawaii International Film Festival	Maverick Award	The Good, The Bad, The Weird	Nominated	
2008	Asia Pacific Screen Awards	Achievement in Directing	The Good, The Bad, The Weird	Nominated	
2008	2008 Buil Film Awards	Buil Readers' Jury Award	The Good, The Bad, The Weird	Nominated	
2008	Korean Film Awards	Best Director	The Good, The Bad, The Weird	Nominated	
2008	11th Director's Cut Awards	Best Director of the Year	The Good, The Bad, The Weird	Won	
2009	2009 Asian Film Awards	Best Film	The Good, The Bad, The Weird	Nominated	
2009	2009 Asian Film Awards	Best Director	The Good, The Bad, The Weird	Nominated	
2009	2009 Baeksang Arts Awards	Best Film	The Good, The Bad, The Weird	Nominated	
2009	2009 Baeksang Arts Awards	Best Director	The Good, The Bad, The Weird	Nominated	
2009	CPH PIX	Politiken's Audience Award	The Good, The Bad, The Weird	Nominated	
2012	16th Fantasia Festival	Cheval Noir Award	Doomsday Book	Won	
2012	Strasbourg International Film Festival	Best International Film	Doomsday Book	Nominated	
2012	Toronto After Dark Film Festival	Best Film Award	Doomsday Book	Won	
2012	15th Vision Fest Next Generation	Director Award	Doomsday Book	Won	
2013	1st Marie Claire Film & Music Festival	Pioneer Award	Kim Jee-woon	Won	
2011	2011 Austin Film Critics Association	Best Foreign Language Film	I Saw the Devil	Won	
2011	2011 Austin Film Critics Association	Best Film	I Saw the Devil	Nominated	
2011	Brussels International Fantastic Film Festival	Golden Raven	I Saw the Devil	Won	
2011	17th Bilbao Fantastic Film Festival	Official Competition Grand Prize	I Saw the Devil	Won	
2011	Central Ohio Film Critics Association	Best Foreign Language Film	I Saw the Devil	Nominated	
2011	Fangoria Chainsaw Awards	Best Foreign Language Film	I Saw the Devil	Nominated	
2011	31st FantaSporto International Film Festival	Orient Express Best Film Award	I Saw the Devil	Won	
2011	31st FantaSporto International Film Festival	Best Director	I Saw the Devil	Won	
2011	Fright Meter Awards	Best Horror Movie	I Saw the Devil	Nominated	
2011	Fright Meter Awards	Best Director	I Saw the Devil	Won	
2011	47th Grand Bell Awards	Best Film	I Saw the Devil	Nominated	
2011	18th Gérardmer Film Festival	Audience Award	I Saw the Devil	Won	
2011	18th Gérardmer Film Festival	Critics Award	Kim Jee-woon	Won	
2011	18th Gérardmer Film Festival	Special Jury Prize	Kim Jee-woon	Won	
2011	18th Gérardmer Film Festival	Youth Jury Grand Prize	I Saw the Devil	Won	
2011	Houston Film Critics Society Awards	Best Foreign Language Film	I Saw the Devil	Won	
2011	Scream Awards	Best Horror Movie	I Saw the Devil	Nominated	
2011	St. Louis Film Critics Association Awards	Best Foreign Language Film	I Saw the Devil	Nominated	
2011	Washington D.C. Area Film Critics Association Awards	Best Foreign Language Film	I Saw the Devil	Nominated	
2016	36th Korean Association of Film Critics Awards	Best Picture	The Age of Shadows	Won	
2016	36th Korean Association of Film Critics Awards	Top 10 Film Awards	The Age of Shadows	Won	
2016	Austin Fantastic Fest	Best Pictures Action Features	The Age of Shadows	Won	
2016	Philadelphia Film Festival	Narrative Awards	The Age of Shadows	Nominated	
2016	37th Blue Dragon Film Awards	Best Film	The Age of Shadows	Nominated	
2016	37th Blue Dragon Film Awards	Best Director	The Age of Shadows	Nominated	
2016	53rd Grand Bell Awards	Best Director	The Age of Shadows	Nominated	
2016	53rd Grand Bell Awards	Best Screenplay	The Age of Shadows	Nominated	
2017	11th Asian Film Awards	Best Film	The Age of Shadows	Nominated	
2017	53rd Baeksang Arts Awards	Best Director (Film)	The Age of Shadows	Won	
2017	53rd Baeksang Arts Awards	Best Film	The Age of Shadows	Nominated	
2017	17th Director's Cut Awards	Special Mention of the Year	The Age of Shadows	Won	
2017	37th FantaSporto International Film Festival	Director's Weekly Best Director Award	The Age of Shadows	Won	
2017	37th Golden Cinematography Award	Grand Prize	The Age of Shadows	Won	
2017	Tromsø International Film Festival	Aurora Award	The Age of Shadows	Nominated	
2018	2018 Resistance Film Festival	Best Director Award	Kim Jee-woon	Won	
2018	San Sebastián International Film Festival	Golden Seashell	Illang: The Wolf Brigade	Nominated	
2023	Sydney Film Festival	Best Film	Cobweb	Nominated	
2023	Grand Bell Awards	Best Film	Cobweb	Nominated	
2023	Grand Bell Awards	Best Director	Cobweb	Nominated	
2023	44th Blue Dragon Film Awards	Best Film	Cobweb	Nominated	
2023	44th Blue Dragon Film Awards	Best Director	Cobweb	Nominated	
2023	10th Korean Film Producers Association Award	Best Director	Cobweb	Won	
2023	Chunsa Film Art Awards	Best Director	Cobweb	Won	

=== State honors ===
Name of country, award ceremony, year given, and name of honor
Country	Award Ceremony	Year	Honor	Ref.
France	Busan International Film Festival – the French Night (Note: Annual Event held at Busan International Film Festival by French Embassy in South Korea)	2018	Ordre des Arts et des Lettres Officier	

=== Listicles ===
Name of publisher, year listed, name of listicle, and placement
Publisher	Year	Listicle	Placement	Ref.
Cine21	2000	Chungmuro 50 Power Filmmaker	36th	
Cine21	2001	Chungmuro 50 Power Filmmaker	34th	
Cine21	2004	Chungmuro 50 Power Filmmaker	32th	
Cine21	2005	Chungmuro 50 Power Filmmaker	30th	
Cine21	2006	Chungmuro 50 Power Filmmaker	44th	
Cine21	2007	Chungmuro 50 Power Filmmaker	28th	
The Herald Economy	2008	Pop Culture Power Leader Big 30	15th	
Sisa Journal	2012	Next Generation Leader—Film Industry	5th	
Sisa Journal	2013	Next Generation Leader — Film Industry	5th	
The Screen	2005	Most Influential Director	8th	
