= The Foul King =

2000 South Korean film

- Theatrical release poster
- Hangul: 반칙왕
- Hanja: 反則王
- RR: Banchigwang
- MR: Panch'igwang
- Directed by: Kim Jee-woon
- Written by: Kim Jee-woon
- Produced by: Lee Mi-yeon
- Starring: Song Kang-ho; Jang Jin-young
- Cinematography: Hong Kyung-pyo
- Edited by: Ko Im-pyo
- Music by: Jang Young-gyu
- Distributed by: Mirovision
- Release date: February 4, 2000 (South Korea)
- Running time: 112 minutes
- Country: South Korea
- Language: Korean
- Budget: US$1.6 million

The Foul King (Korean: 반칙왕; RR: Banchigwang) is a 2000 South Korean sports comedy film, written and directed by Kim Jee-woon. It was Kim's second feature-length film after The Quiet Family. Like the director's debut film, The Foul King also stars Song Kang-ho, this time as an incompetent bank clerk who takes up a career in professional wrestling, adopting the moniker "The Foul King" in the ring.

== Plot ==
Bank teller Im Dae-ho leads a monotonous life at the bank counter, devoid of anything exciting. He frequently arrives late, has poor performance metrics, and is constantly scolded by the deputy manager, often falling victim to his headlock attacks. To make matters worse, the coworker he secretly admires doesn't even spare him a glance. Feeling dispirited, Dae-ho unexpectedly finds an escape in the Jang Chil-sam Pro Wrestling Gym.

As a child, he admired the rule-breaking wrestler Ultra Tiger Mask, and now, desperate to find a way out of his boss's headlocks, he decides to learn wrestling. The gym owner, hesitant at first, accepts Dae-ho when looking for an opponent to face the skilled wrestler Yoo Bi-ho in a match. By night, Dae-ho transforms into a rule-breaking wrestler, gradually regaining his lost enthusiasm. Eventually, he steps into the ring for a fierce showdown against Yoo Bi-ho.

== Cast ==
- Song Kang-ho as Im Dae-ho
- Jang Jin-young as Jang Min-young
- Park Sang-myun as Tae Baek-san
- Kim Soo-ro as Yoo Bi-ho
- Jang Hang-sun as Jang Gwan-jang
- Jung Woong-in as Choi Du-sik
- Shin Goo as Im Dae-ho's father
