= Yim Pil-sung =

South Korean film director

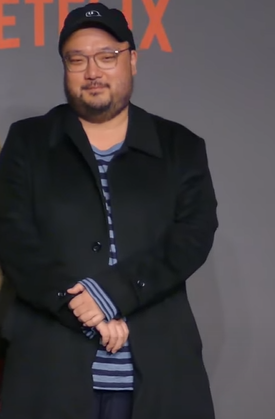
- Yim in 2019
- Born: May 13, 1972 (age 54); Seoul, South Korea
- Occupations: Film director; screenwriter; actor
- Years active: 1996–present

Korean name
- Hangul: 임필성
- RR: Im Pilseong
- MR: Im P'ilsŏng

Yim Pil-sung (born May 13, 1972) is a South Korean film director and screenwriter. He wrote and directed Antarctic Journal (2005), Hansel and Gretel (2007), and Scarlet Innocence (2014).

== Career ==
=== Short films ===
Yim Pil-sung began directing short films in 1997, with Souvenir as his first. Brushing (1998), about an overweight teenage boy who is left home alone with his senile grandfather, was invited to the Clermont-Ferrand International Short Film Festival. Baby (1999) screened at the Venice Film Festival and Karlovy Vary International Film Festival. Mobile (starring Park Hae-il, Yoon Jin-seo, and Yoon Je-moon) was included in the 2003 omnibus Show Me.

=== Antarctic Journal ===
In 2005, he made his feature film debut with Antarctic Journal, a tale of six South Korean explorers on an expedition to reach one of the remotest points in the South Pole, until mysterious deaths begin to occur as the human psyche preys on itself amidst the icy, barren landscape. The big-budget film starred Song Kang-ho and Yoo Ji-tae, and was shot in New Zealand. It won the Best Feature Film award in the Orient Express-Casa Asia section of the 38th Sitges Film Festival.

Yim then played a small supporting role in Bong Joon-ho's monster movie The Host (2006), as a white-collar worker who betrays his college friend. He had agreed to appear in the film in exchange for Bong co-writing the screenplay to Antarctic Journal.

=== Hansel and Gretel ===
With his second directorial feature, Yim established himself as a genre filmmaker whose works explore the depths of horror and fantasy. Inspired by the titular fairy tale, in Hansel and Gretel (2007) a young man (Chun Jung-myung) gets lost in a forest and stumbles into a house inhabited by three strange children (Shim Eun-kyung, Eun Ji-won and Jin Ji-hee) who refuse to let him leave. It received a Special Mention at the 12th Puchon International Fantastic Film Festival in 2008 and won two awards at the 29th Fantasporto in 2009, the Special Jury Prize in the Fantasy competition and Best Film in the Orient Express sidebar.

Despite praise for their striking visuals and surprising narrative twists, both of Yim's films were unsuccessful at the box office, which led to him having difficulty finding financing for his succeeding projects.

=== Doomsday Book ===
In 2007, Yim and Kim Jee-woon (as co-directors) began filming the sci-fi omnibus Doomsday Book. But financing problems halted production; it resumed in 2010, and the film was released in 2012. Yim wrote and directed two of the film's three segments. Both black comedies, the first segment A Brave New World is about a zombie invasion caused by contaminated meat (starring Ryoo Seung-bum), while the third segment Happy Birthday is about a family hiding in an underground shelter as an 8-Ball-shaped asteroid wipes out mankind (starring Jin Ji-hee). Doomsday Book won the top prize at the 16th Fantasia Festival, the Cheval Noir Award for Best Film.

Yim had next planned to direct a suspense drama about a married American expat who falls for a Korean femme fatale. Titled Flower of Evil, it entered pre-production in 2009 but was eventually shelved. Weekend Prince, a comedy about three men in their thirties who get roaring drunk one weekend (which had Park Hae-il and Song Sae-byeok attached), similarly did not come to fruition.

In 2010, twelve Korean directors and cinematographers shot short films using the iPhone 4 for the iPhone 4 Film Festival (later renamed the Olleh Smartphone Film Festival). Yim's short Super Nerds: No Pain No Gain is a comedy about two die-hard iPhone fans and their journey to find someone who can attach a protective film to their newly purchased iPhones without causing air bubbles to form (in the Korean title Super Deokhu, "deokhu" originates from the Japanese word "otaku").

Yim then starred in two mockumentary-style films in 2013. In E J-yong's Behind the Camera, an absentee filmmaker attempts to direct a film remotely via Skype. Then in Bong Man-dae's comedy Playboy Bong, Yim played a director shooting an erotic-horror film in Bali who gets replaced when the film's producer is disappointed in the sex scenes.

=== Scarlet Innocence ===
Seven years after Hansel and Gretel, Yim returned with his third feature in 2014. Scarlet Innocence is a modern-day retelling of the classic Korean folktale Simcheongga; in the original, a virtuous girl named Shim Chung sacrifices herself so that her father's sight may be restored. But in Yim's film noir, a university professor gradually succumbing to blindness moves to a rural town and begins an obsessive affair with a young woman 17 years his junior (played by Jung Woo-sung and Esom, respectively). Scarlet Innocence made its world premiere at the 2014 Toronto International Film Festival.

== Filmography ==
=== Feature film ===
Feature film credits
Year	Title		Credited as		Ref.
Year	English	Original	Director	Screenwriter	Ref.
2005	Antarctic Journal	남극일기	Yes	Yes	
2007	Hansel and Gretel	헨젤과 그레텔	Yes	Yes	
2014	Scarlet Innocence	마담 뺑덕	Yes	Yes	

=== Short film ===
Short film credits
Year	Title		Credited as					Ref.
Year	English	Original	Director	Screenwriter	Planner	Editor	Producer	Ref.
1996	A Bit Bitter	생강	—N/a		Yes	—N/a		
1997	Souvenir	기념품	Yes	Yes	—N/a			
1998	Brushing	소년기	Yes	Yes	—N/a	Yes	Yes	
1999	Baby	베이비	Yes	Yes	—N/a	—N/a	Yes	
2003	Mobile	모빌	Yes	Yes	—N/a			
2010	Super Nerds: No Pain No Gain	슈퍼 덕후	Yes	Yes	—N/a			
2012	Doomsday Book – "A Brave New World" and "Happy Birthday"	인류멸망보고서	Yes	Yes	—N/a			
2019	Persona	페르소나	Yes	Yes	—N/a			

=== Art performance ===
Directing credit in art performance
Year	Title		Role	Ref.
Year	English	Korean	Role	Ref.
2015	The Red Dance	적 (赤)	Director	

=== As actor ===
- No Blood No Tears (2002) – extra
- The Host (2006) – actor
- A Night on Earth (short film, 2010) – actor
- Waiting for Jang Joon-hwan (short film, 2012) – cameo
- Behind the Camera (2013) – cameo
- Playboy Bong (2013) – actor
