= Antarctic Journal =

- Theatrical release poster
- Hangul: 남극일기
- Hanja: 南極日記
- RR: Namgeugilgi
- MR: Namgŭgilgi
- Directed by: Yim Pil-sung
- Written by: Yim Pil-sung; Bong Joon-ho; Lee Hae-jun
- Produced by: Cha Seung-jae; Noh Jong-yun; Chae Hoe-seung
- Starring: Song Kang-ho; Yoo Ji-tae
- Cinematography: Chung Chung-hoon
- Edited by: Kim Sun-min
- Music by: Kenji Kawai
- Distributed by: Showbox
- Release date: May 19, 2005
- Running time: 114 minutes
- Country: South Korea
- Language: Korean
- Budget: US$6.5 million
- Box office: US$5.6 million

Antarctic Journal is a 2005 South Korea survival psychological horror film directed by Yim Pil-sung in his feature film debut. Starring Song Kang-ho and Yoo Ji-tae, the film mixes elements of psychological thriller and classical horror films while showing the hardships met by a modern Korean antarctic expedition trying to reach the pole of inaccessibility. The film generated some buzz before its release due to its large budget (over US$6.5 million) and notable cast, but wasn't a box office hit.

== Plot ==
During their journey to the Pole of Inaccessibility (POI), the remotest point of the Antarctic, the expedition of six men, led by Captain Choi Do-hyung, discovers a journal that was left behind by a British expedition 80 years earlier. The journal was remarkably preserved in a box in the snow and Kim Min-jae, another member of the expedition, gets the job of examining it. It turns out that the two expeditions shared the same goal and soon other strange similarities between them start to show up. Will they make it to their destination before the sun goes down for the Antarctic winter?

== Cast ==
- Song Kang-ho as Choi Do-hyung
- Yoo Ji-tae as Kim Min-jae
- Choi Deok-moon as Seo Jae-kyung
- Kim Kyeong-ik as Yang Geun-chan
- Park Hee-soon as Lee Young-min
- Yoon Je-moon as Sung-hoon
- Kang Hye-jung as Yoo-jin
- Sam Hammington as English expedition party (voice)
- Oh Hee-joon as Person

== Reception ==
Derek Elley from Variety wrote, "Some awesome widescreen lensing, with New Zealand convincingly repping the polar wastes, can't compensate for the dramatic emptiness of Antarctic Journal, in which the script gets lost along with the explorers."

== See also ==
- List of Korean-language films
- Cinema of Korea
- K-Horror
- Contemporary culture of South Korea
