= Doomsday Book (film) =

- Korean theatrical poster
- Hangul: 인류멸망보고서
- Hanja: 人類滅亡報告書
- Lit.: Report on the Destruction of Mankind
- RR: Illyu myeolmang bogoseo
- MR: Illyu myŏlmang pogosŏ
- Directed by: Kim Jee-woon; Yim Pil-sung
- Written by: Yim Pil-sung; Lee Hwan-hee; Kim Jee-woon; Jang Jong-ah
- Produced by: Choi Hyeon-muk; Kim Myeong-eun; Oh Yeong-hun
- Starring: Ryoo Seung-bum; Kim Kang-woo; Song Sae-byeok
- Cinematography: Jo Sang-yun (A Brave New World); Kim Ji-yong (The Heavenly Creature); Ha Seong-min (Happy Birthday)
- Edited by: Im Seon-gyeong (A Brave New World); Mun Se-gyeong (The Heavenly Creature); Nam Na-yeong (Happy Birthday)
- Music by: Mowg
- Production companies: Zio Entertainment; TimeStory Group
- Distributed by: Lotte Entertainment
- Release date: April 5, 2012
- Running time: 115 minutes
- Country: South Korea
- Language: Korean
- Budget: US$5 million
- Box office: ₩704,635,000

Doomsday Book (Korean: 인류멸망보고서; lit. 'Report on the Destruction of Mankind') is a 2012 South Korean science-fiction anthology film directed by Kim Jee-woon and Yim Pil-sung. It tells three unique stories of human self-destruction in the modern high-tech era, while displaying an alternative form of genuine humanity and compassion. A Brave New World is a political satire about a viral zombie outbreak; The Heavenly Creature philosophizes on whether a robot can achieve enlightenment; and in Happy Birthday a dysfunctional family bonds in the midst of an apocalypse.

It won the top prize at the 2012 Fantasia Festival. The jury honored it with the Cheval Noir Award for best film for "its intelligence and originality."

== Production ==
Doomsday Book was originally conceived as a three-part anthology film to be directed by Kim Jee-woon, Yim Pil-sung, and Han Jae-rim. Filming began on May 21, 2006, but shortly after Kim and Yim had shot their segments, financing fell apart and the film was put on hold. Han's third segment titled "The Christmas Gift" (a SF musical retelling of O. Henry's short story, about a woman's primal desires emerging when confronted with her last chance to survive after witnessing the end of the world) was never shot, and the two thirds remained unreleased.

But in 2010 with backing from new investor TimeStory, shooting restarted quietly with Yim and Kim collaborating on a new third installment to the trilogy with Yim as the lead director and Kim in more of a "guest director" role.

It was pre-sold to six countries at the Berlin Film Market and screened at the Cannes Film Festival.

== Synopsis ==
=== A Brave New World ===
(멋진 신세계; Meotjin sinsegye)

Left alone after his parents go abroad on a holiday with his sister, geeky research scientist Yoon Seok-woo (Ryoo Seung-bum) disposes of the accumulated rubbish in the family flat, which includes a rotten apple. Through the waste disposal system, the apple enters the food chain in the form of recycled feed for cows. Seok-woo and his date, Kim Yoo-min (Go Joon-hee), end up eating the toxic beef during a barbecue one evening, and soon they and the rest of the population become flesh-eating zombies.

Directed by Yim Pil-sung. Written by Yim Pil-sung, Lee Hwan-hee. Also starring Kim Roi-ha (as Seok-woo's father), Lee Kan-hee (as Seok-woo's mother), Hwang Hyo-eun (as Seok-woo's sister), Ma Dong-seok (as a disorderly student), Jung Woo (as Joong-dong), Choi Deok-moon (as cook), Kim Mu-yeol (as Ji-ho), Bong Joon-ho (as Lee Joon-ho), Park Ho-young (as Park Ho-young), and Yoon Je-moon (as Joo Je-moon).

=== The Heavenly Creature ===
(천상의 피조물; Cheonsangui pijomul)

Park Do-won (Kim Kang-woo), a young technician employed by robotics corporation UR International, is called out to check an RU-4 robot named In-myung (voiced by Park Hae-il) employed at a Buddhist monastery. In-myung has become Buddhist and claims to have achieved enlightenment; the monks want to know whether he really is one or is just a robot with a technical glitch. Do-won gives In-myung a clean bill of technical health but says he is unqualified to do any more. Later, UR chairman Kang (Song Young-chang), and his team led by research executive Min (Kim Seo-hyung), arrive at the monastery to decommission In-myung, on the grounds that he is an old series. Do-won and Bodhisattva Hye-joo (Kim Gyu-ri) then try to save the robot from its imminent demise.

Written and directed by Kim Jee-woon. Original story by Park Seong-hwan. Also starring Jo Yoon-hee (as Ji-eun), Lee Bong-gyu (as Monk Joo-ji), and Jung Jae-jin (as Spiritual Leader).

=== Happy Birthday ===
(해피 버스데이; Haepi beoseudei)

Young Park Min-seo (Jin Ji-hee) secretly orders a replacement 8 Ball from a strange website so her pool-obsessed father (Lee Seung-joon) and nerdy uncle Hwan (Song Sae-byeok) won't notice she's damaged it. She throws the original ball out of the window and it drops down a hole in the street. Two years later, South Korea is threatened by an asteroid that looks exactly like a giant version of the 8 Ball. In their underground shelter, the family tries to cancel the order via the extraterrestrial website. Ten years later, the adult Min-seo (Bae Doona) and her family emerge from their shelter.

Directed by Yim Pil-sung. Written by Yim Pil-sung, Jang Jong-ah. Original story by Park Su-min. Also starring Yoon Se-ah (as Min-seo's mother), Ryu Seung-soo (as male newscaster), Lee Young-eun (as female newscaster Lee Eun-kyung), John Kim (as former NASA researcher), Kevin Lee (as Ministry of Science and Technology resource person), Oh Jae-min (as male home shopping channel host), Kim Ok-jin (as female home shopping channel host), Jung Chul (as home shopping model 1), Jo Seung-min (as home shopping model 2), Nam Yoon-young (as home shopping model 3), Go Joon-hee (as weather girl), Lee Kyung-ho (as signs scholar), and Lee Sang-joon (as Galaxy courier).

== Awards and nominations ==
2012 Fantasia Festival

- Cheval Noir Award

2013 Asian Film Awards

- Nomination - Best Visual Effects - Kwak Tae-yong, Hwang Hyo-kyun, Im Jung-hoon
