= Song Jun-pyoung =

South Korean footballer

Song Jun-pyeong
Personal information
- Full name: Song Jun-pyeong
- Date of birth: 29 July 1996 (age 30)
- Place of birth: South Korea
- Height: 1.78 m (5 ft 10 in)
- Position: Defender

Youth career
- Yonsei University

Senior career*
Years	Team	Apps	(Gls)
2017–2019	Suwon Samsung Bluewings	0	(0)
- * Club domestic league appearances and goals

- Song Jun-pyoung
- Hangul: 송준평
- RR: Song Junpyeong
- MR: Song Chunp'yŏng

Song Jun-pyeong (Korean: 송준평; born 29 July 1996) is a South Korean former football defender. After playing at collegiate level for Yonsei University, he turned professional and was signed by Suwon Samsung Bluewings. In 2020, Song retired from professional football due to a recurrent injury. His father is acclaimed actor Song Kang-ho.
