= Song Kang-ho =

South Korean actor (born 1967)

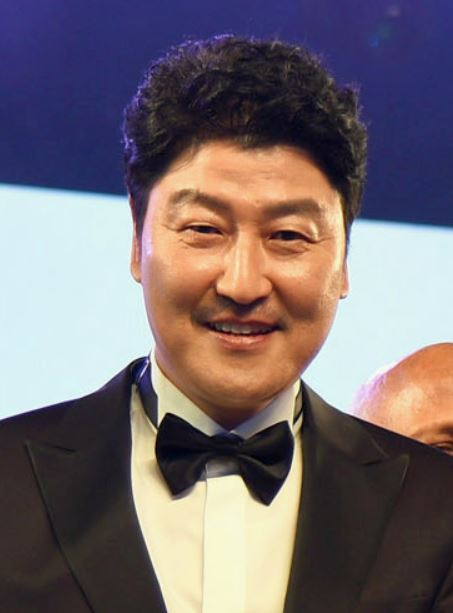
- Song in 2016
- Born: 17 January 1967 (age 59); Gimhae, South Korea
- Occupation: Actor
- Years active: 1991–present
- Agent: Sublime
- Spouse: Hwang Jang-suk (m. 1994)
- Children: 2, including Jun-pyoung
- Awards: Full list
- Honours: Ok-gwan Order of Cultural Merit (2019); Bo-gwan Order of Cultural Merit (2022)

Korean name
- Hangul: 송강호
- Hanja: 宋康昊
- RR: Song Gangho
- MR: Song Kangho

Song Kang-ho (Korean: 송강호; born 17 January 1967) is a South Korean actor. Widely regarded as one of the most influential actors in Korean cinema, he has appeared in critically acclaimed films across various genres. He is the recipient of numerous accolades, including a Cannes Film Festival Award, three Baeksang Arts Awards, four Blue Dragon Film Awards, and five Grand Bell Awards. In 2020, The New York Times named him one of the greatest actors of the 21st century.

Song first gained recognition with the crime thriller No. 3 (1997), and later rose to prominence with Park Chan-wook's critically acclaimed film Joint Security Area (2000). He is known for his collaborations with filmmaker Bong Joon-ho in Memories of Murder (2003), The Host (2006), Snowpiercer (2013), and Parasite (2019). Song rose to wider international prominence for his performance in Parasite, which won the Palme d'Or at the Cannes Film Festival and the Academy Award for Best Picture. He has also worked extensively with director Kim Jee-woon, starring in five of his films: The Quiet Family (1998), The Foul King (2000), The Good, the Bad, the Weird (2008), The Age of Shadows (2016), and Cobweb (2023).

His other notable films include Sympathy for Mr. Vengeance (2002), Secret Sunshine (2007), Thirst (2009), The Attorney (2013), The Throne (2015), A Taxi Driver (2017), and Broker (2022), for the latter of which he won the Best Actor prize at the Cannes Film Festival. Song has been named Gallup Korea's Film Actor of the Year four times (2013, 2017, 2019 and 2020).

== Early life ==
Song Kang-ho was born on 17 January 1967, in Gimhae, South Gyeongsang Province. He graduated from Gimhae High School and had aspirations of becoming an actor since his second year at Garak Middle School. At the time, the country had just five theater and film departments. Despite failing the entrance exam once, he eventually studied at Gyeongsang National University in Busan. However, he was drafted for mandatory military service soon after. After completing his service, Song did not return to college and instead joined a theater company in Busan at age 23.

== Career ==
=== 1991–1997: Early career ===
In 1990, Song Kang-ho attended a performance of "Mr. Choi," a play by Yeonwoo Theater Company in Busan. This experience ignited his passion for acting and inspired him to pursue his dream. The following year, at the age of 23, he moved to Seoul with the sole purpose of realizing his ambition, and he immediately headed to Yeonwoo Theater without any concrete plans. Song approached Ryu Tae-ho, the director of Yeonwoo Theater Company, and humbly pleaded for an opportunity to stay and contribute, even if it meant working as a theater cleaner. Determined to make his mark, he visited the theater four times and left his contact information. As fate would have it, he was eventually called upon to assist with an event organized by the theater due to a staff shortage.

During this event, Song had an encounter with director Yi Sang-woo. Impressed by Song's dedication, Yi Sang-woo offered him the advice: "Yeonwoo Theater shouldn't be your ultimate goal. It should be a place where you immerse yourself to fulfill your own purpose." Then, Yi Sang-woo welcomed Song Kang-ho as a member of the theater. In 1991, Song made his stage debut in the play of "Dongseung" (A Little Monk). Over the next few years, he honed his craft on stage, earning a reputation as a remarkably talented actor.

Since I was young, I learned acting by immersing myself in the theater company scene. Yi Sang-woo and Kim Seok-man could be silent teachers because they were from the Yeonwoo stage. The mechanical engineering department can teach you how to sharpen a metal, but the theater and film department can't teach you acting.

— Song Kang-ho, Vogue Magazine Interview

In 1995 Song joined Theater Company Chaimu, founded by theater director Yi Sang-woo. Director Yi Sang-woo said, "I saw Song Kang-ho and Yoo Oh-sung, who were drinking all the time at my officetel in 1995, and thought, 'Everyone is going to be ruined like this.' That was the beginning," he explained. Song became an early member of the troupe alongside Moon Seong-geun, Yu Oh-seong, Ryu Tae-ho, film director Yeo Gyun-dong, and drama writer Jeong In-ok.

Although Song was regularly approached to act in films, he always turned down the opportunity until he was in his 30s. In 1996, he finally accepted a role as an extra in Hong Sang-soo's 1996 film The Day a Pig Fell into the Well. After that, Song drew attention for his acting as Pan-soo in Lee Chang-dong's Green Fish in 1997. His portrayal of a gangster who wielded an iron pipe and jumped into the car Mak-dong (played by Han Seok-kyu) in an underground parking lot was so realistic that rumors even circulated that a real gangster had been cast. The following year, Song played one of the homeless characters in Jang Sun-woo's documentary-style Bad Movie. Song gained cult notoriety for his performance as Jopil, a stuttering gangster who trained a group of young recruits in Song Neung-han's No. 3. Song became the most notable actor of 1997, sweeping the Best New Actor Award at the Grand Bell Awards and the Blue Dragon Film Awards.

=== 1998–2002: Path to leading roles ===
Director Kim Jee-woon opened a new path for Song, who had been cast mainly as bullies and gangsters, by casting him as Young-min, the eldest son of Park In-hwan and Na Moon-hee, in his debut film, The Quiet Family (1998) The movie was his second large role with Choi Min-sik. He then took on his first leading role as agent Lee Jang-gil, Han Suk-kyu's partner, in Kang Je-gyu's blockbuster thriller Shiri (1999). However, it was director Kim Jee-woon who elevated Song into leading actor status in his film The Foul King (2000). The movie was released in cinemas in February 2000, with Song portraying Lim Dae-ho, a bank clerk turned professional wrestler, for which he did most of his own stunts. Song's comedic acting was often praised as being topped with wide emotional range, and his popularity surged from the success of The Foul King. Song states this role was his hardest role as an actor.

Song's performance in the Myung Film production Joint Security Area (2000) as North Korean Army sergeant Oh Joong-pil established him as one of South Korea's leading actors. He won the Best Actor Award at the 38th Grand Bell Awards for this performance. Song also starred in the first installment of Park Chan-wook's acclaimed Vengeance trilogy, Sympathy for Mr. Vengeance (2002), which centers on a father's pursuit of his daughter's kidnappers. In 2002, Song starred in another major production by Myung Films, YMCA Baseball Team (2002), which is about Korea's first baseball team formed in the early 20th century.

=== 2003–2018: Prominence ===
In 2003, Song played a leading role as Park Doo-man, an incompetent rural detective, in another critically acclaimed hit, Memories of Murder, from young director Bong Joon-ho. It was the first of several critically acclaimed movies they would make together, with commentators describing Bong's relationship with Song as a "great actor-director collaboration". With it, Song swept the best actor awards at various awards ceremonies, including the 40th Grand Bell Awards in 2003, establishing himself as the best actor in the Korean film industry in the early 2000s.

In 2004, Song starred in The President's Barber by debut director Im Chan-sang, which imagines the life of South Korean president Park Chung Hee's personal barber. The following year he also took the lead in Antarctic Journal, a big-budget project by debut director Yim Pil-sung about an expedition in Antarctica that performed weakly at the box office.

In 2006, through director Bong Joon-ho's film The Host, Song rose to the ranks of 10 million actors. The film helped to broaden international awareness of Song's talent, and in March 2007 he was named Best Actor at the inaugural Asian Film Awards in Hong Kong. More high-profile projects followed: The Show Must Go On saw him star as an aging gangster, for which he received a Blue Dragon Film Award for best actor.

Song starred opposite Jeon Do-yeon in Lee Chang-dong's film Secret Sunshine (2007), as a local mechanic in Miryang Kim Jong-chan and won Best Actor at the 6th Korean Film Awards,10th Director's Cut Awards, and Palm Springs International Film Festival. Jeon Do-yeon won the Prix d'interprétation féminine (Best Actress) at the 2007 Cannes Film Festival, making her the first Korean ever to receive an acting award at Cannes Film Festival.

In 2008, Song acted in Kim Jee-woon's western film set in 1930s Japanese-occupied Manchuria, The Good, the Bad, the Weird. The film showcased an ensemble of stars with Lee Byung-hun as "the bad", Jung Woo-sung as "the good" and Song as "the weird". The film earned US$128,486 in North America and US$44,132,723 in other territories, bringing the worldwide gross to US$44,261,209. It was the second highest grossing Korean film in 2008 after Scandal Makers, beating The Chaser and it is one of the highest-grossing films of all time in South Korea which attracted 6.68 million viewers.

In 2009, Song acted in Park Chan-wook's vampire film Thirst, opposite Kim Ok-vin. Song notably appeared full frontally nude in this film. In the same year, Song acted as North Korean spy Ji-won in spy thriller Secret Reunion. A shootout in the middle of the city brings together Ji-won and National Intelligence Service agent Lee. The operation to capture an assassin spy known as 'Shadow' ends in disaster and the agent Lee is dismissed from his post. Ji-won is also abandoned by his organization after being framed as a traitor.

Two 2012 films, the gangster love story Hindsight, and the suspense film Howling, were considered as Song's box office slump. However, in 2013, Song made a splendid resurrection by becoming an actor of 20 million through three films in which he appeared. Starting the English-language dystopian blockbuster Snowpiercer with 9.35 million viewers. The period drama The Face Reader, where Song acted as Nae-kyeong, the greatest face reader of Joseon, who can see through people by looking at their faces, reached 9.13 million viewers. The Attorney which was inspired by Roh Moo-hyun's early days as a human rights Lawyer, was breaking records, surpassing 10 million viewers only within 32 days, the shortest time ever.

Song continued to star in a number of critically acclaimed films, including Lee Joon-ik's period film The Throne. Song played as King Yeongjo, the Korean ruler who infamously had his belligerent son, the Crown Prince Sado (played by Yoo Ah-in), suffocated to death in a large wooden chest filled with rice. Later, Song reunited with director Kim Jee-woon after eight years in the period action film The Age of Shadows. Song won Best Actor in 53rd Baeksang Arts Awards for his role as Lee Jung-chool, a Korean police captain that has been charged by the Japanese colonial government with rooting out members of the country's resistance movement. The success of the film in reaching over the 7.4 million viewers mark, made Song the first leading actor in Korean cinema to record over 100 million admissions throughout the course of his career.

In 2016, Song starred in the film A Taxi Driver, as Kim Man-seob, a widowed taxi driver. The film centers on a taxi driver from Seoul who unintentionally becomes involved in the events of the Gwangju Uprising in 1980. It is based on a real-life story of German journalist Jürgen Hinzpeter's interactions with driver Kim Sa-bok. The film was released on 2 August 2017, in South Korea. On the same day, the film had its international premiere at the Fantasia International Film Festival in Montreal, where Song was awarded as Best Actor for his role in the film.

=== 2019–2023: Parasite and international stardom ===
In 2019, Song starred as Kim Ki-taek in the critically acclaimed film Parasite, also directed by his frequent collaborator Bong Joon-ho. It won the Palme d'Or at the 2019 Cannes Film Festival, becoming the first Korean film to receive the award. It was selected as the South Korean entry for Best International Feature Film at the 92nd Academy Awards, Bong's second selection after 2009's Mother.

It's not as if I always write with him in mind because he's a comfortable collaborator. I do give it a lot of thought, but because this film starts with a story of average neighbors and builds to something extreme, to cover that wide range, I thought Song Kang-ho would be the best to handle it. Especially in the climax; his character doesn't have any lines—it's the subtle changes in his muscles, the subtle tremors, that have to convince the audience of the entire film. Song has that strength as an actor.

— Bong Joon-ho on why he cast Song Kang-ho for Parasite, Interview with The Atlantic

In 2020, The New York Times released a list of the 25 greatest actors of the century. In the list of 25 internationally known screen figures, Song Kang-ho was ranked sixth. The newspaper also published an interview with director Bong Joon-ho. Song is known as Bong's muse, having featured in four of his films.

In the same year it was announced that Song co-starred in Kore-eda Hirokazu's debut Korean-language film Broker, alongside Lee Ji-eun, Bae Doona and Gang Dong-won. He started filming in 2021 and acted as Ha Sang-hyeon, the owner of a hand laundry who takes babies from a baby box at a nearby church and sells them with the help of his partner Dong-soo.

In 2021, Song was selected as one of the nine judges in the competition section of the 74th Cannes Film Festival to be held from 6 July to 17 July. In the same year, Song reteamed for the fifth time with leading Korean director Kim Jee-woon on the feature film Cobweb. The scriptwriter of Cobweb was Shin Yeon-shick, who also wrote the screenplay for the sports film One Win, in which Song also starred.

The following year, Broker was released on 8 June 2022. Song was awarded Best Actor at the 75th Cannes Film Festival for his performance in Broker. Song was the first Korean to win Best Actor Award at Cannes.

Of course, winning an award from such a prestigious festival as Cannes is a great and happy moment, an unforgettable turning point in my life. However, I don't think the action [of receiving an award] itself holds much significance. Because from the perspective of someone creating a film, the ultimate and most important purpose of the film is interaction with the audience. During the process, I have won the award, but that itself cannot become the purpose. […] There is no difference in me, Song Kang-ho, before and after the Cannes award. The meaning lies in unwaveringly doing the best I can [in future projects]

— Song Kang-ho on winning Best Actor in Cannes, Korea Joongang Daily

Song also acted in the lead role in the blockbuster disaster film Emergency Declaration. Song plays the role of the detective In-ho. This film is directed by Han Jae-rim, who worked with Song in the historical film The Face Reader (2013). The film was first screened in the out of competition section of the 74th Cannes Film Festival on 16 July 2021. It was slated to release theatrically in January 2022, but due to a new wave of the COVID-19 pandemic its release was delayed. It was finally released theatrically in South Korea on 3 August 2022 and it was released in the United States on 12 August 2022.

In May 2023, it was reported that Song would be the male lead in a Korean remake of the Indian film Drishyam.

=== 2024–present: Venture to small screen ===
In 2022, Song was reported to star alongside Byun Yo-han in Uncle Samsik, marking Song's television series debut. Set in the 1960s, the series depicts the intertwined story of two men, exploring themes of pride, greed, and their camaraderie. Shin Yeon-shick wrote and directed the series, making it his third collaboration with Song, following the feature films Cobweb and One Win. For his portrayal, Song won Best Actor at the 19th Seoul International Drama Awards.

In December 2024, Song agreed to appear in the second season of the American comedy-drama series Beef.

== Endorsements ==
In 2001, Song became the promotional face for Kooksoondang's traditional liquor, Baeksaju. The partnership contributed to a significant increase in the brand's recognition within the Japanese market. Following a five year partnership from 2001 to 2005, Song signed a three year exclusive contract with the company in 2009. This agreement was notable as the first of its kind in the South Korean advertising sector, where six month or one year terms were the standard industry practice.

Song has represented a diverse range of sectors, including food, electronics, and finance. His early endorsements included a kimchi refrigerator in 2002 and a pizza franchise in 2003. By 2005, his market value for an air purifier campaign reached a 100 million won guarantee. Between 2007 and 2012, he was selected for several high profile financial campaigns, representing Hana Financial Group alongside Jeon Do-yeon and appearing in a Hyundai Card commercial with Jung Woo-sung and Lee Byung-hun in 2008. In 2012, he joined Choi Min-sik and Seol Gyeong-gu as a representative for NH Nonghyup Bank. In 2014, Song and Yu Hae-jin fronted a campaign for Nongshim to coincide with the product's first major recipe and design update in 28 years.

Following a hiatus from the advertising sector, Song returned in 2020 after the international success of Parasite. This return included a contract with Lina Life Insurance and his first major overseas endorsement for the mobile strategy game Rise of Kingdoms.

== Personal life ==
In November 1994, Song married theater actress Hwang Jang-sook. The couple has a daughter, Song Joo-yeon, and a son, Song Jun-pyoung. Born in 1996, Song Jun-pyoung, is a former professional footballer who played for the Suwon Samsung Bluewings U-18 team before retiring due to injuries. He has stated in interviews that both he and his father sought to maintain a professional distance to minimize public scrutiny of their relationship.

In 2005, Song's driver's license was suspended for 100 days after he was apprehended by police for driving with a blood alcohol content of 0.095%.

=== Philanthropy ===
Song is a member of the Hope Bridge Honors Club, a designation for major donors to the Hope Bridge Disaster Relief Association. (Note: The Hope Bridge Korea Disaster Relief Association is a non-profit organization established in 1961. It was founded by newspaper companies, broadcasting companies, and social organizations to assist individuals affected by unforeseen disasters. Originally known as the "Korea Flood Damage Response Committee", it initially focused on providing financial aid for the victims of Typhoon Sarah in 1959. In 1964, the organization was renamed the "Korea Disaster Response Association" to expand its relief efforts and promote a culture of donation within society. In 2001, with the amendment of the Disaster Relief Act, The Hope Bridge Korea Korea Disaster Relief Association became the only relief organization in the country authorized by the government to raise and distribute donations for domestic natural disasters.) In March 2020, he donated 200 million won to the association to support COVID-19 relief efforts. He contributed a further 100 million won in March 2022 to assist in recovery from a large-scale wildfire that spread from Uljin, North Gyeongsang, to Samcheok, Gangwon.

== Filmography ==
=== Film ===
Year	Title	Role	Notes	Ref.				
Year	Title	Role	Notes	Ref.	1996	The Day a Pig Fell into the Well	Dong-seok	Bit part
1997	Green Fish	Pan-su						
1997	No. 3	Jo-pil						
1997	Bad Movie	Homeless man						
1998	The Quiet Family	Kang Yeong-min						
1999	Shiri	Lee Jang-gil						
2000	The Foul King	Dae-ho						
2000	Joint Security Area	Sgt. Oh Kyeong-pil						
2002	Sympathy for Mr. Vengeance	Park Dong-jin						
2002	YMCA Baseball Team	Lee Ho-chang						
2003	Memories of Murder	Detective Park Doo-man						
2004	The President's Barber	Seong Han-mo						
2005	Antarctic Journal	Choi Do-hyung						
2005	Lady Vengeance	Hired Assassin #1	Cameo					
2005	Madagascar	Alex	Voice; Korean dub					
2006	The Host	Park Gang-du						
2007	The Show Must Go On	Kang In-goo						
2007	Secret Sunshine	Jong-chan						
2008	The Good, the Bad, the Weird	Yun Tae-goo / The Weird						
2009	Thirst	Sang-hyun						
2010	Secret Reunion	Agent Lee Han-gyu						
2010	A Little Pond	Police officer	Cameo					
2011	Hindsight	Doo-hun						
2012	Howling	Sang-gil						
2012	Day Trip	Master	Short film					
2013	Snowpiercer	Namgoong Minsu						
2013	The Face Reader	Nae-gyeong						
2013	The Attorney	Song U-seok						
2015	The Throne	King Yeongjo						
2016	The Age of Shadows	Lee Jung-chool						
2017	A Taxi Driver	Man-seob						
2018	The Drug King	Lee Doo-sam						
2019	Parasite	Kim Ki-taek						
2019	The King's Letters	King Sejong						
2021	Emergency Declaration	In-ho						
2022	Broker	Ha Sang-hyeon						
2023	One Win	Kim Woo-jin						
2023	Cobweb	Director Kim-yeol						
TBA	Gardeners	Choi Young-il						

=== Television ===
Year	Title	Role	Notes	Ref.			
Year	Title	Role	Notes	Ref.	2024	Uncle Samsik	Park Doo-chil / Uncle Samsik
2026	Beef	Dr. Kim	Season 2				

=== Hosting ===
Year	Title	Notes	Ref.
2023	28th Busan International Film Festival closing ceremony	First solo host	

== Theater ==
=== Plays ===
Year	Title		Role	Theater	Date	Ref.
Year	English	Korean	Role	Theater	Date	Ref.
1990	Teacher Choi	최선생	Extra	Busan	—	
1990	Narat-nim's words	나랏님 말싸미	Clown 3	Theater Company Dawn (Busan)	27–28 October	
1991	The Little Monk	동승	Old man	Yeonwoo Small Theater	14 September to 31 October	
1991	Park Cheomji	박첨지		Yeonwoo Small Theater	14 September to 31 October	
1991	The Little Monk	동승	Old man	Dongsung-dong Literature Theatre	1 to 14 December	
1991	The Little Monk	동승	Old man	Garam Culture and Arts Center Art Hall Premier	21 to 25 December	
1992	Fly, birds - children's stories for adults	날아라 새들아 - 어른을 위한 어린이의 이야기		Yeonwoo Small Theater	12 June to 19 July	
1992	I have soup	국물 있사옵니다	President, manager	Yeonwoo Small Theater	10 June to 4 July	
1992	Cooney Country - Wonderland	쿠니 나라 - 이상한 나라	male, soldier	Culture and Art Hall Grand Theater	17–30 November	
1993	Women's Rebellion	여성반란	Prime Minister, Mayor	Small Theater Sanwoolim	14 September to 10 October	
1994	Giselle	지젤	Hilarion	Batanggol Art Museum	13 January to 6 March	
1995	Playland	플레이랜드		Hakjeon Blue Small Theater	8 September to 8 October	
1996	Bi Aeonso	비언소	Strange man	Daehak-ro Information Theatre in Seoul	15 July to 30 August	
1998	Moral thief	도덕적 도둑		Cultural Center Small Theater	27 March to 2 April	

=== Musicals ===
Year	Title		Role	Venue	Date	Ref.
Year	English	Korean	Role	Venue	Date	Ref.
1995	Musical: "I Will Become a Star,"	뮤지컬 '스타가 될꺼야'	Role	Venue	Date	
1995	Shim Soo-il and Lee Soon-ae - Young Soo-il and Sunny Soon-ae sing, dance and love	심수일과 이순애 - 젊은 수일이와 맑은 순애가 노래하고 춤추고 사랑한다	The president of the harbour, the cleaner	Seoul Arts Center Towol Theater	27 January to 12 March	
