= Cobweb (2023 South Korean film) =

2023 South Korean film by Kim Jee-woon

- Theatrical release poster
- Hangul: 거미집
- RR: Geomijip
- MR: Kŏmijip
- Directed by: Kim Jee-woon
- Written by: Shin Yeon-shick
- Produced by: Choi Jae-won; Ahn Eun-mi; Shin Yeon-shick; Ahn Soo-hyun; Choi Dong-hoon
- Starring: Song Kang-ho; Im Soo-jung; Oh Jung-se; Jeon Yeo-been; Krystal Jung
- Cinematography: Kim Ji-yong
- Edited by: Yang Jin-mo
- Music by: Mowg
- Production companies: Anthology Studio; Barunson Studio; Luz Y Sonidos
- Distributed by: Barunson E&A
- Release dates: May 25, 2023 (Cannes); September 27, 2023 (South Korea)
- Running time: 135 minutes
- Country: South Korea
- Language: Korean
- Box office: US$2.1 million

Cobweb (Korean: 거미집; RR: Geomijip) is a 2023 South Korean black comedy-drama film directed by Kim Jee-woon and written by Shin Yeon-shick. It stars Song Kang-ho, Im Soo-jung, Oh Jung-se, Jeon Yeo-been, and Krystal Jung. Set in 1970s South Korea, it follows a director (Song) who becomes obsessed with reshooting his film's ending, pushing a chaotic production to the brink of madness amid censorship and an exasperated crew.

The film premiered in the non-competitive section at the 2023 Cannes Film Festival. It was released theatrically on September 27, 2023, coinciding with Korean Chuseok holidays.

== Plot ==
Kim Yeol, the director of a hugely successful debut film, has since fallen out of favor with critics, who dismiss his increasingly commercial melodramas and compare him unfavorably with his late mentor, the acclaimed director Shin Sang-ho. Struggling with the pressure, Kim relies heavily on antidepressants. After having a vivid dream about his latest film, Cobweb, he becomes convinced that recreating the dream's scenes will turn the film into a masterpiece. Believing that abandoning this opportunity out of fear of criticism would be a sin, he decides to change the ending despite having already completed the film. However, the sets are being dismantled, the actors are committed elsewhere, and the revised screenplay has been rejected by the Ministry of Culture and Information for its supposedly decadent portrayal of the heroine, Min-ja.

Kim nevertheless gathers the cast and crew for an unauthorized reshoot. His only major ally is Mi-do, the heir to the production company, who becomes fascinated by the new screenplay's Kafkaesque quality. With her financial support, the set is preserved and filming resumes, despite constant opposition. A Ministry official arrives to stop the production, only to be plied with alcohol, while the crew eventually locks the set and disconnects its telephones to prevent anyone from leaving. When a supporting actor playing a hunter attempts to escape after becoming furious with his role and the rewritten story, he too is subdued and confined. To conceal the illegal shoot, the crew prepares a fake anti-communist screenplay and uses it to obtain the authorities' cooperation.

The production becomes even more chaotic when actress Han Yu-rim returns despite being scheduled for another production. Having been promised that the reshoot will take only a day, she becomes furious when the work proves far more demanding, particularly after real spiders are used during filming without her consent. After a bitter confrontation with Mi-do and a revelation concerning her pregnancy and affair with fellow actor Ho-se, Yu-rim appears ready to abandon the film. Mi-do attempts to replace her but proves incapable of acting convincingly in front of the cameras, leaving Yu-rim as the only viable choice. She eventually returns and delivers a powerful performance. Meanwhile, Kim becomes increasingly obsessed with completing his vision, even seeing a hallucination of his dead mentor telling him that trusting himself is the essence of talent.

For the final scene, Kim insists on shooting a single continuous long take ending with the set being set on fire. During the take, Mi-do realizes that the supporting actor and a Ministry official are still trapped upstairs and desperately begs Kim to stop. Kim refuses, unwilling to sacrifice the shot, and completes the sequence before the two men are rescued. Despite the chaos, the authorities ultimately allow the production to continue, and the completed Cobweb is eventually screened. Kim receives the applause and recognition he has long desired, but his expression remains empty. His apparent triumph is undermined by the revelation of the secret behind his career.

Years earlier, during a fire on one of Shin Sang-ho's sets, Shin was left unconscious inside while everyone else escaped. Kim, then his assistant director, tried to rush back into the flames but was restrained. In that moment, however, he decided to steal Shin's unpublished screenplay instead. He secretly took the manuscript and used it as the basis for his acclaimed debut, taking credit for the work himself. Only Kim and Chairman Baek, who had encountered him while stealing money from Shin's safe during the fire, know the truth. Kim's pursuit of a masterpiece through Cobweb is therefore revealed as an attempt to prove himself and escape the guilt of having built his career on his mentor's stolen work.

== Cast ==
- Song Kang-ho as Kim-yeol, a film director who is obsessed with the desire to make Cobweb into a masterpiece. Based on the motif of Kim Ki-young.
- Im Soo-jung as Lee Min-ja, a veteran actress who plays Kang Ho-se's wife in Cobweb
- Oh Jung-se as Kang Ho-se, popular playboy actor who is the male protagonist of Cobweb
- Jeon Yeo-been as Shin Mi-do, person in charge of finance of Shin Sung Film, which produces Cobweb
- Krystal Jung as Han Yu-rim, a new actress who is rapidly growing in popularity in Cobweb
- Jang Young-nam as Chairman Baek, a producer of Cobweb
- Jung In-ki as Hunter, a long time colleague of Kim Ki-yeol
- Jang Nam-yeol as Park Joo-sa, a literary scholar who visits the filming site of Cobweb
- Park Jung-soo as Mrs. Oh, Kim Ki-yeol's regular actress who says that she will appear only for money
- Shin Sung-pil as Mr. Baek, a producer of Cobweb
- Kim Min-jae as Chief Kim
- Kim Dong-young as an assistant director who worked with Kim Ki-yeol for a long time
- Kim Joong-hee as Detective Gu
- Jung Woo-sung as Shin Sang-ho, film director who died in an unexpected accident. Based on the motif of Shin Sang-ok.

== Production ==
Principal photography began on March 8, 2022 and concluded on June 6, 2022.

The film alternates between two series of sequences: scenes in colour depicting the events that happen while the crew is filming under constraints of time and censorship, with somehow reluctant actors, who have been asked to come back in emergency to the film studio for two days; and scenes in black-and-white, that are the results of these studio shooting scenes.

== Release ==
Cobweb has been invited to the out of competition section of the 76th Cannes International Film Festival which premiered worldwide on May 25, 2023. The film was invited to the competition section of the 70th Sydney Film Festival. It will also screen in the Noves Visions section at the 56th Sitges Film Festival. The film has had a limited release in Australia on October 4 through Umbrella Entertainment and Dendy Cinemas. It was released in France on November 8, 2023.

== Reception ==
=== Box office ===
As of October 14, 2023, the film has grossed US$2,174,044 at the local box office and accumulated 306,700 admissions from 209 screens.

=== Critical response ===
On the review aggregator website Rotten Tomatoes, 76% of 21 critics' reviews are positive, with an average rating of 6.9/10.

Variety called the film a "frantic, flimsy moviemaking meta-farce".

=== Accolades ===
Award	Year	Category	Recipient(s)	Result	Ref.
Baeksang Arts Awards	2024	Best Film	Cobweb	Nominated	
Baeksang Arts Awards	2024	Best Supporting Actress	Krystal Jung	Nominated	
Baeksang Arts Awards	2024	Technical Award	Jeong Yi-jin (Art direction)	Nominated	
Blue Dragon Film Awards	2023	Best Film	Cobweb	Nominated	
Blue Dragon Film Awards	2023	Best Director	Kim Jee-woon	Nominated	
Blue Dragon Film Awards	2023	Best Actor	Song Kang-ho	Nominated	
Blue Dragon Film Awards	2023	Best Supporting Actor	Oh Jung-se	Nominated	
Blue Dragon Film Awards	2023	Best Supporting Actress	Jeon Yeo-been	Won	
Blue Dragon Film Awards	2023	Best Supporting Actress	Krystal Jung	Nominated	
Blue Dragon Film Awards	2023	Best Screenplay	Shin Yeon-shick	Nominated	
Blue Dragon Film Awards	2023	Best Music	Mowg	Nominated	
Blue Dragon Film Awards	2023	Best Cinematography	Kim Ji-yong	Nominated	
Blue Dragon Film Awards	2023	Best Lighting	Pak Jun-u	Nominated	
Blue Dragon Film Awards	2023	Best Editing	Yang Jin-mo	Nominated	
Blue Dragon Film Awards	2023	Best Art Direction	Jeong Yi-jin	Won	
Chunsa Film Art Awards	2023	Best Director	Kim Jee-woon	Won	
Chunsa Film Art Awards	2023	Best Actor	Song Kang-ho	Nominated	
Chunsa Film Art Awards	2023	Best Supporting Actress	Jeon Yeo-been	Nominated	
Chunsa Film Art Awards	2023	Best Supporting Actress	Krystal Jung	Won	
Chunsa Film Art Awards	2023	Best Screenplay	Shin Yeon-shick	Nominated	
Director's Cut Awards	2024	Best Director	Kim Jee-woon	Nominated	
Director's Cut Awards	2024	Best Actress	Jeon Yeo-been	Nominated	
Director's Cut Awards	2024	Best Actress	Krystal Jung	Nominated	
Director's Cut Awards	2024	Best Actor	Song Kang-ho	Nominated	
Director's Cut Awards	2024	Best Screenplay	Shin Yeon-shick	Nominated	
Director's Cut Awards	2024	Best New Actress	Krystal Jung	Nominated	
Grand Bell Awards	2023	Best Film	Cobweb	Nominated	
Grand Bell Awards	2023	Best Director	Kim Jee-woon	Nominated	
Grand Bell Awards	2023	Best Actor	Song Kang-ho	Nominated	
Grand Bell Awards	2023	Best Supporting Actor	Oh Jung-se	Won	
Grand Bell Awards	2023	Best Supporting Actress	Jeon Yeo-been	Nominated	
Grand Bell Awards	2023	Best Supporting Actress	Krystal Jung	Nominated	
Grand Bell Awards	2023	Best Screenplay	Shin Yeon-shick	Nominated	
Grand Bell Awards	2023	Best Music	Mowg	Nominated	
Grand Bell Awards	2023	Best Sound	Choi Tae-won	Nominated	
Grand Bell Awards	2023	Best Cinematography	Kim Ji-yong	Nominated	
Grand Bell Awards	2023	Best Film Editing	Yang Jin-mo	Nominated	
Grand Bell Awards	2023	Best Art Direction	Jeong Yi-jin	Nominated	
Grand Bell Awards	2023	Best Costume Design	Choi Eui-young	Nominated	
10th Korean Film Producers Association Award	2023	Best Director	Kim Jee-woon	Won	
10th Korean Film Producers Association Award	2023	Best Art Direction	Jeong Yi-jin	Won	
10th Korean Film Producers Association Award	2023	Best Cinematography	Kim Ji-yong	Won	
10th Korean Film Producers Association Award	2023	Best Music	Mowg	Won	
Sydney Film Festival	2023	Best Film	Cobweb	Nominated	
Buil Film Awards	2024	Best Film	Cobweb	Nominated	
Buil Film Awards	2024	Best Director	Kim Jee-woon	Nominated	
Buil Film Awards	2024	Best Actor	Song Kang-ho	Nominated	
Buil Film Awards	2024	Best Supporting Actor	Oh Jung-se	Nominated	
Buil Film Awards	2024	Best Supporting Actress	Jeon Yeo-been	Nominated	
Buil Film Awards	2024	Best New Actress	Krystal Jung	Won	
Buil Film Awards	2024	Best Cinematography	Kim Ji-yong	Nominated	
Buil Film Awards	2024	Best Art/Technical Awards	Jeong Yi-jin	Nominated	
Buil Film Awards	2024	Best Music	Mowg	Won	
