= The President's Barber =

- Theatrical release poster
- Hangul: 효자동 이발사
- Hanja: 孝子洞 理髮師
- RR: Hyoja-dong ibalsa
- MR: Hyoja-dong ibalsa
- Directed by: Im Chan-sang
- Written by: Im Chan-sang
- Produced by: Choi Yong-bae
- Starring: Song Kang-ho; Moon So-ri
- Cinematography: Jo Yong-gyu
- Edited by: Kim Hyun
- Music by: Peter Schindler; Park Ki-heon; Lee Geun-hwa
- Distributed by: Showbox
- Release date: 5 May 2004
- Running time: 116 minutes
- Country: South Korea
- Language: Korean

The President's Barber (Korean: 효자동 이발사) is a 2004 South Korean comedy-drama film written and directed by Im Chan-sang. It follows a barber, his wife, and their only son through four decades of tumultuous Korean history. Much as in Forrest Gump, we see important moments in South Korean history through the eyes of the titular barber, who is drafted to be the official barber of President Park Chung Hee. The role of the barber is played by Song Kang-ho and Moon So-ri plays his wife.

== Plot ==
Seong Han-mo is a barber who owns a shop in the president's neighborhood, the Blue House. Politically not very well-versed, he always joins his acquaintances' opinions and at first isn't aware what consequences result from president Rhee's resignation in 1960 after several student demonstrations. Rhee leaves a power vacuum that is soon filled by a military regime led by General Park Chung Hee who puts himself at the top of the government in 1963.

Han-mo, however, has different concerns as his wife Min-ja brings a son into a politically turbulent time. Han-mo's barber shop is running well and he has no need to concern himself about how to feed his family when KCIA-Chief Jang enters his shop and orders him to the president. From that day on, Han-mo is the president's barber and, for his neighbors, one of the most important people in the country.

== Cast ==
- Song Kang-ho as Seong Han-mo
- Moon So-ri as Kim Min-ja
- Ryu Seung-soo as Seong Jin-gi
- Lee Jae-eung as Seong Nak-an
- Jo Yeong-jin as Park Chung Hee
- Son Byong-ho as chief of security
