= Secret Reunion =

- Theatrical release poster
- Hangul: 의형제
- Hanja: 義兄弟
- RR: Uihyeongje
- MR: Ŭihyŏngje
- Directed by: Jang Hoon
- Screenplay by: Jang Min-seok; Kim Joo-ho; Choi Kwan-young; Jang Hoon
- Story by: Kim Ki-duk (uncredited)
- Produced by: Yoo Jeong-hoon; Song Myung-cheol; Jang Won-seok
- Starring: Song Kang-ho; Gang Dong-won
- Cinematography: Lee Mo-gae
- Edited by: Nam Na-yeong
- Music by: Noh Hyung-woo
- Production companies: Showbox; Rubicon Pictures; Dasepo Club
- Distributed by: Showbox
- Release date: 4 February 2010
- Running time: 116 minutes
- Country: South Korea
- Language: Korean
- Box office: US$36.3 million

Secret Reunion (Korean: 의형제; RR: Uihyeongje; lit. 'Sworn Brothers; Blood Brothers') is a 2010 South Korean action film directed by Jang Hoon, and one of the highest grossing Korean films of 2010. It follows a former National Intelligence Service (NIS) agent (Song Kang-ho) and a North Korean sleeper operative (Gang Dong-won) who, years after a failed assassination, unexpectedly reunite and form an unlikely bond.

This is the second film by director Jang Hoon, who completed Rough Cut two years prior.

== Plot ==
Ji-won is one of numerous North Korean undercover spies living in South Korea as ordinary citizens until he's called to fulfill his mission: the assassination of Kim Jong Il's second cousin who wrote a book that Pyongyang blasts as a great betrayal to the fatherland. One of his fellow spies, Tae-soon, betrays his orders by switching his allegiance to South Korea and Ji-won becomes a target for both Koreas.

Lee Han-gyu is a dedicated agent of the National Intelligence Service (NIS) who tries to foil the hit. Despite having insider information, he doesn't notify his agency superiors and only involves his team in the mission. Unable to prevent the assassination and with the loss of fellow agents in a gunfight, he becomes the sole scapegoat for the agency and gets discharged.

Six years later, Lee is a private investigator and bounty hunter who locates runaways mail order bride, while Ji-won works in construction. By coincidence, Lee gets saved from a mob by Ji-won; they both recognize each other instantly but keep it to themselves. With an ulterior motive for their unfinished business, Han-gyu talks Ji-won into working for him and sharing living quarters – as Ji-won accepts Han-gyu's offer to spy on him, thinking that Han-gyu is still an NIS agent. While confronting Tae-soon for betraying their home country, Ji-won learns his true reasons behind it and including his own suspicions about Shadow. Tae-soon also mentions that Han-gyu came to visit him to check up on him. Ji-won learns that Han-gyu was fired from the NIS for failing to report the information to his superiors that could've prevented the loss of both civilian and agent lives. As a result, he must make ends meet as a private investigator in returning runaway foreign brides to their husbands and shutting down a corrupt business ring that is ripping them off. During that time, a former associate of Han-gyu reaches out for his help.

While secretly spying on Ji-won when he's out, Han-gyu discovers Shadow, along with three other important people. He and Gyeong-nam confront Rev. Lee about his involvement. The pastor reveals Ji-won's real name, Jo In-joon, and that he has family back in North Korea. He hasn't seen his wife and daughter for seven years. When the North Korean government mistakenly labels him a traitor, Ji-won is forced to hide in South Korea. He desperately goes to Rev. Lee for help in getting his family out of North Korea for a better life. It is then Han-gyu finally realizes what the apartment payment was meant for: his family. Before Rev. Lee can help Ji-won get his family out, the nuclear incident occurs and naturally the borders tighten. The next day, Ji-won comes across Tae-soon's body and feels guilty for attacking him earlier. An agent from the NIS recognizes him and orders Ji-won to turn himself in.

When Lee discovers that the watch was fitted with a GPS system, he desperately follows Ji-won and tries to warn him to get rid of the watch. In the car, Shadow gives him one last chance to prove himself to their motherland. The North Korean professor has betrayed them by revealing secrets to the NIS, thus they must get rid of him. After killing him, Han-gyu arrives and takes off Ji-won's watch, which gets him stabbed. He then learns that Shadow was the real traitor in his killing spree and that he was the one who kept him from being with his family. Betrayed, Ji-won attempts to fight him off but is shot and Han-gyu kills Shadow. The NIS thanks him for his help but Han-gyu rejects returning as an agent and remains a PI, at least until the superior retires. Encouraged by Ji-won's letter to visit his own family in England, he does and is surprised to see Ji-won and his family on the same flight.

== Cast ==
- Song Kang-ho as Lee Han-gyoo, a NIS agent
- Gang Dong-won as Song Ji-won, a spy from North Korea
- Jeon Gook-hwan as Shadow
- Park Sung-yeon as Han-gyoo's wife
- Park Hyuk-kwon as Ko Kyeong-nam
- Yoon Hee-seok as Son Tae-soon
- Park Soo-young as Regional police chief
- Choi Jung-woo as NIS department head
- Ko Chang-seok as Vietnamese gang boss
- Kim Young-woong as Min Cheol, armed agent #1 in stairway

== Reception ==
In South Korea well over 5 million tickets were sold, making it the second highest grossing Korean film of the year 2010 next to The Man from Nowhere. This puts it in the all-time box office records of South Korea.
