= The Quiet Family =

1998 film by Kim Jee-woon

- Original Korean poster
- Hangul: 조용한 가족
- Hanja: 조용한 家族
- RR: Joyonghan gajok
- MR: Choyonghan kajok
- Directed by: Kim Jee-woon
- Written by: Kim Jee-woon
- Produced by: Lee Eun
- Starring: Park In-hwan; Na Moon-hee; Choi Min-sik; Song Kang-ho; Go Ho-kyung; Lee Yoon-seong
- Cinematography: Jeong Kwang-seok
- Edited by: Ko Im-pyo
- Music by: Jo Yeong-wook; Jeon Sang-yoon
- Distributed by: Myung Films
- Release date: April 25, 1998
- Running time: 99 minutes
- Country: South Korea
- Language: Korean

The Quiet Family (Korean: 조용한 가족; RR: Joyonghan gajok) is a 1998 South Korean black comedy horror film written and directed by Kim Jee-woon, in his directorial debut. The story centers on a family who owns a hunting lodge in a remote area, whose customers always happen to end up dying. Among the film's main cast are pre-stardom Choi Min-sik and Song Kang-ho.

The film was loosely remade in Japanese as The Happiness of the Katakuris by Takashi Miike, in Indian Tamil as Yaamirukka Bayamey, in Kannada as Namo Bhootatma and in Telugu as Next Nuvve.

== Plot ==
An extended family has moved from the city (presumably Seoul) to live in a large house out in the mountains, which they convert into a lodge for hikers. Consisting of a middle aged father Kang Dae-goo, mother Jeong Soon-rye, Dae-goo's younger brother Kang Chang-goo, and their adult children Kang Young-min, Kang Mi-soo, and Kang Mina, they suffer a string of misfortunes as various patrons come to stay.

Their first guest, a hiker, asks for a room and three beers. Left to himself, he spends the night forging his room key holder to be sharp enough to stab himself and is found dead the next morning. The father of the family decides on burying the body in the woods, under the assumption that no one would believe this to be a suicide. Later, a young couple drops in for a stay to have sex in the privacy of their room and end up dead together the next morning. A pair of friends from town stop by for drinks until one of the men falls for Mi-soo and subsequently attempts to rape her, but she is saved by Young-min, who accidentally ends up pushing the man off a cliff, while his friend is taken captive by the family to prevent him from calling the police.

Mr. Park, the benefactor of the family (providing them the house) later asks for their lodging for his younger (and illegitimate) half sister to have a hitman check into the neighboring room at midnight and murder her so he can be the only successor to the claim inheritance of the soon profitable land. Uninformed of the plan, Uncle Kang senses foul play and sends the half sister home to Seoul when she is found to be restless. The plan goes further awry when the hitman arrives fifteen minutes late, and the room had been taken by an undercover cop investigating the recent string of missing people, mistaken to be the hitman. The hitman thus ends up killing the cop instead, and is later killed by a suspicious Young-min.

A heavy rainstorm overnight nearly uncovers the buried corpses by morning, leaving the family no choice but to incinerate them. When Uncle returns from the trip to Seoul, he angers Dae-goo who had hoped to settle Mr. Park's plot without any trouble. A fight ensues as Uncle is beaten senseless but is saved from a blow to the head by Young-min who then trips, hitting his head on the stairs, he is whisked to the hospital, leaving the elderly parents the only ones left to finish the job. The local man, having been imprisoned, bound and gagged, tries to make his escape but gets his ropes tangled in several trees as he escapes the lodge.

Soon enough, Mr. Park drops in unannounced to check if his sister-in-law has been terminated as planned, but is in complete shock when he sees Mr. Kang and Mrs. Jeong carrying the corpse of the undercover cop, knowing that he wasn't the hitman. A brief struggle begins when Mr. Park tries to escape without trying to figure out just what exactly has happened, and ends after he accidentally falls to his death down the stairs, adding yet another body to be done away with for the family.

To drive away attention, Mrs. Jeong switches off the circuits throughout the lodge and outside storage where she and her husband are piling the corpses, dousing them in gasoline. Mina, trying to watch TV, asks for Uncle Kang to switch the circuits back on, inadvertently causing a socket in the storage to burst in flames, triggering the cremation fire prematurely, trapping the parents inside. Meanwhile, Young-min is in the hospital recovering from his concussion and laughing insanely over a news report on the shooting of a North Korean agent wandering through the forest, who turns out to be none other than the hitman, whose body wasn't seen with the rest of the corpses after Young-min knocked him down with a shovel. Young-min wonders how the hitman ends up being in the news before continuing laughing out loud while the nurses and a patient look at him in confusion.

After an uncertain amount of time later, Uncle Kang, Young-min, Mi-soo, and Mina are preparing to serve dinner, totally unaware of the fire in the storage building. The parents return, in bandages, having survived the fire. Without a single word, the family quietly has dinner until there is a sudden knock at the door. Unsure of what to do, they all stand quietly in the doorway of the dining room, waiting for whoever is at the door to go away. When the dog starts barking at the knocking, the family, in unison hushes the dog; they have become the quiet family.

The film ends with a wide shot of the lodge in winter, with Mina outside, looking at it, and then to the camera with an uncertain look on her face; all to the sound of The Partridge Family's "I Think I Love You".

== Cast ==
- Park In-hwan as Kang Dae-goo
- Na Moon-hee as Jeong Soon-rye
- Song Kang-ho as Kang Young-min
- Choi Min-sik as Kang Chang-goo
- Go Ho-kyung as Kang Mina
- Lee Yoon-seong as Kang Mi-soo
- Gi Ju-bong as lonely man
- Choi Cheol-ho as man with pills
- Shin Young-ae as woman with
- Ji Su-won as Eun-soo
- Jung Woong-in as Mi-soo's admirer
- Jung Jae-young as Hyun-seok
- Jang Ka-hyeon as Hyun-seok's lover
- Lee Ki-young as killer
- Han Seong-sik as Police officer Oh
- Ha Deok-bu as Doctor
- Jo Deok-je as Police officer Jo
- Yoo Hyung-kwan as Mr. Jang
- Kim Jong-goo as substation chief

== Awards and nominations ==
Awards and nominations
| Year | Award | Category | Nominee(s) | Result | Ref(s). |
|---|---|---|---|---|---|
| 1999 | 19th Fantasporto International Film Festival | Best Film Award | The Quiet Family | Won | |
| 2000 | Málaga International Week of Fantastic Cinema | Best Film | Kim Jee-woon | Won | |
| 2000 | Málaga International Week of Fantastic Cinema | Best Director | Kim Jee-woon | Won | |
