= Restless (2022 film) =

- Poster
- French: Sans répit
- Directed by: Régis Blondeau
- Written by: Régis Blondeau; Julien Colombani
- Starring: Franck Gastambide; Simon Abkarian; Michaël Abiteboul
- Distributed by: Netflix
- Release date: 25 February 2022
- Running time: 96 minutes
- Country: France
- Language: French

Restless (French: Sans répit) is a 2022 French action thriller film directed by Régis Blondeau, written by Régis Blondeau and Julien Colombani and starring Franck Gastambide, Simon Abkarian and Michaël Abiteboul. It is based on the 2014 South Korean film A Hard Day by Kim Seong-hun.

== Plot ==
Lieutenant Thomas gets a call regarding a police matter while driving a car at night, but a dog blocking his way makes him swerve and hit a person. He sees a man's body lying on the ground and puts it in the trunk. Meanwhile, his partner Marc flushes Thomas's bribe money down a toilet to protect him from being caught by Internal Affairs, who are investigating a drug smuggling operation. Thomas attends his mother's funeral and manages to hide the man's body inside the casket. He hears a ringtone from the coffin, presumably the dead man's phone, but the casket is buried the next day without anyone else noticing it.

Several police officers go on a raid of the local drug lord Manuel Barcelo's residence and are shown his photograph, which Thomas recognizes as the dead man buried with his mother. He sees the dog and follows it to the location of the accident, when another policeman comes over and says an anonymous person reported a hit-and-run at that place. The surveillance camera footage near the accident is unable to identify the license plate of the car in question because it's too blurry.

Back at work, Thomas gets a phone call from a man who claims to have seen Manuel Barcelo being loaded by Thomas onto his car. As Thomas is walking in a parking lot, he is almost run over by a car, but is able to safely get back to his desk at the police station. Commissioner Antoine Marelli of Narcotics arrives and kicks Thomas and apologizes saying he mistook Thomas to be a robber. Thomas confronts Marelli in a bathroom, but is beaten down and is asked to bring Barcelo.

Thomas goes to the graveyard where his mother is buried and drags out Barcelo's body. Believing there ought to be a reason why Marelli is so interested in the dead body, he searches it to find the cell phone, and two bullets behind the dead man, indicating that he was shot before being hit by a car. Thomas goes back to Barcelo's place and finds a photo by his dog. Barcelo's phone rings, and the caller admits to being worried if Marelli had him killed. Naomi identifies the caller as a Michael Bourgi. Marc comes over to Naomi's desk and sees a photo of Thomas speeding in his car at the same place as the accident, and realizes that Thomas hit Barcelo with his car.

Bourgi is at a laundromat when Thomas arrives and tortures him for information. Bourgi confesses that Marelli is trying to find a key to open a vault containing drug money. Apparently, Marelli stole the drugs which were supposed to be destroyed by the police following a drug bust, and sold them to private clubs and gangs with the help of Barcelo. However, Barcelo sold some drugs to Albanian gangs behind Marelli's back and stored the drug money in a vault, hiding the key inside himself. A furious Marelli went on a killing spree of many of the gang members.

While trying to retrieve the key from Barcelo's body, Thomas is arrested by Marc, who drives them to a meeting spot to inform the drug gang that they aren't doing any favors for them anymore. Thomas gets a phone call from Marelli, asking him to get out of the car. As Thomas walks away from the car, a large crate falls on Marc's car, instantly killing him. Marelli reveals that he is responsible for Marc's death, and that he is in Thomas's home with his daughter.

Thomas drives frantically to his home to check on his daughter to find her safe with his sister. He receives texts on his phone ordering him to bring Barcelo's body to a certain location. Thomas sends his sister and daughter on a trip to ensure their safety. He then collects a few explosives from the police weapons division and plants them on the body of Barcelo. Thomas meets up with Marelli, who freely admits to shooting Barcelo and then watching Thomas run him over. Marelli takes Thomas's gun and tries to shoot him with it, but is surprised to see it's loaded with blanks. Marelli aims his own gun at Thomas, who discloses that he has an email scheduled to be sent out the next day that implicates Marelli, who decides not to shoot down Thomas. As Marelli drives away, the explosives detonate, setting his car on fire. He tries to run down Thomas with the burning car, who shoots down Marelli dead.

Thomas is arrested by the police, but let go and resigns from the police force, donating his severance pay to Marc's wife. Naomi meets with Thomas and gives him the key to the vault, found in Marc's car. Thomas opens the vault using the key and the code in the photo found at Barcelo's place, and finds truckloads of money.

== Cast ==
- Franck Gastambide as Thomas
- Simon Abkarian as Marelli
- Michaël Abiteboul as Marc
- Tracy Gotoas as Naomi
- Jemima West as Agathe
- Serge Hazanavicius as Commissaire Vaubour
- Victoire Zenner as Louise
- Perez Michael as Michael Bourgi
- Nabil Missoumi as Barcelo
- Fabrice de la Villehervé as Responsible Chambre Mortuaire
