= Lee Sun-kyun =

South Korean actor (1975–2023)

- 이선균
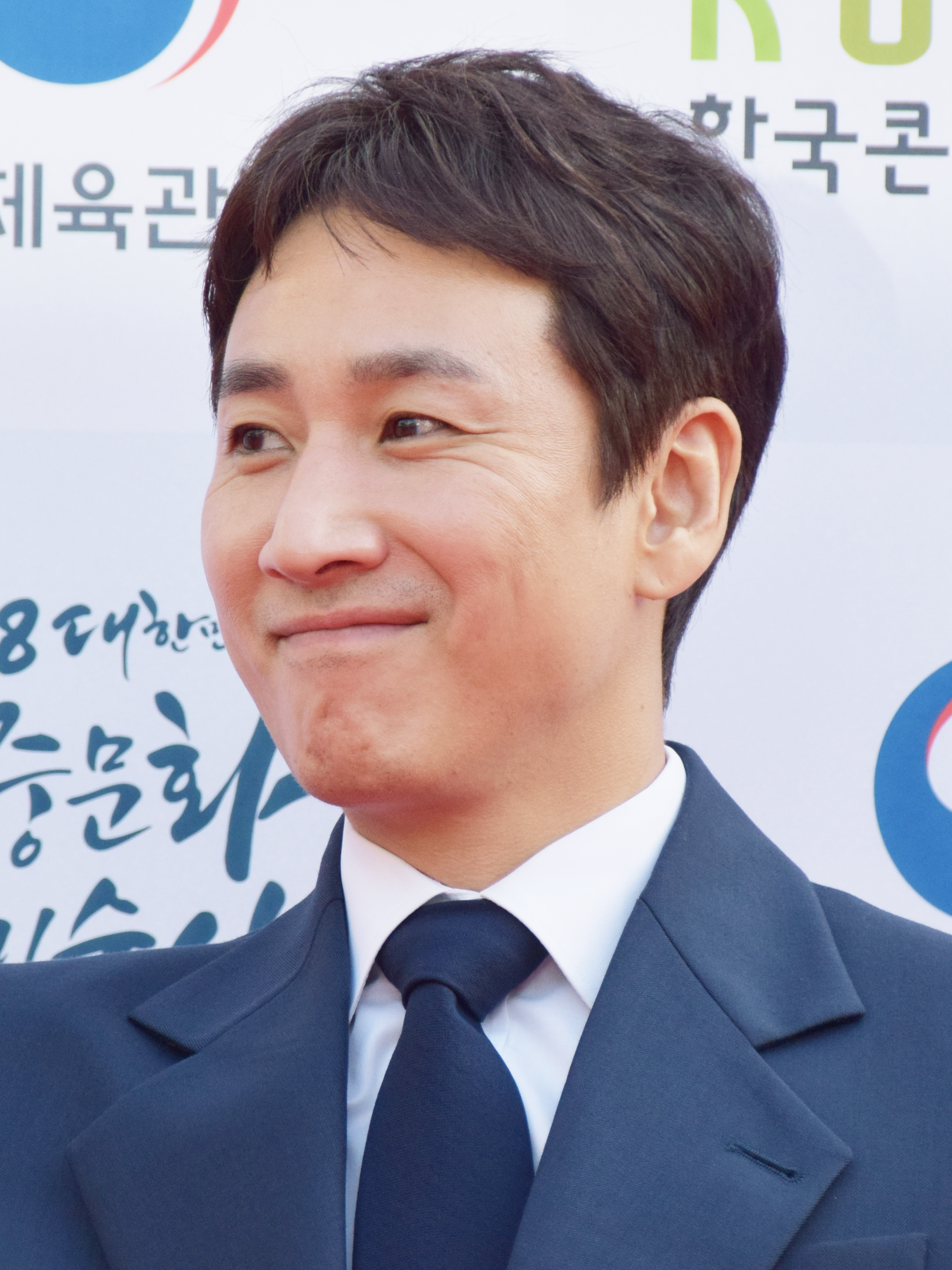
- Lee in October 2018
- Born: March 2, 1975; Seoul, South Korea
- Died: December 27, 2023 (aged 48); Seoul, South Korea
- Cause of death: Suicide by carbon monoxide poisoning
- Education: Korea National University of Arts (BFA)
- Occupation: Actor
- Years active: 2000–2023
- Agent: Hodu&U Entertainment
- Spouse: Jeon Hye-jin (m. 2009)
- Children: 2

Korean name
- Hangul: 이선균
- Hanja: 李善均
- RR: I Seongyun
- MR: I Sŏn'gyun

Lee Sun-kyun (Korean: 이선균; March 2, 1975 – December 27, 2023) was a South Korean actor. Internationally, he was best known for his role in Bong Joon-ho's Academy Award–winning film Parasite (2019), for which he won an Actor Award along with his castmates. He received several other awards, including a nomination for an International Emmy Award.

Lee debuted as an actor in 2000 and starred in TV dramas and musical theatre. The dramas Behind the White Tower and Coffee Prince (both 2007) brought Lee mainstream popularity, which he followed with Pasta (2010), Golden Time (2012), and My Mister (2018). On the big screen, he was known for his collaborations with director Hong Sang-soo in the arthouse films Oki's Movie (2010) and Nobody's Daughter Haewon (2013). His other high-profile films include mystery thriller Helpless (2012), romantic comedy All About My Wife (2012), and action thriller A Hard Day (2014), the latter of which won him the Baeksang Arts Award for Best Actor.

Following the success of Parasite, Lee continued to take on diverse and critically acclaimed roles. He starred in the first Apple TV+ Korean-language series, Dr. Brain (2021), the political drama Kingmaker (2022), the crime thriller Payback: Money and Power (2023), and the psychological thriller Sleep (2023). On December 27, 2023, Lee died from suicide at the age of 48. At the time of his death, Lee had been investigated for alleged drug consumption.

== Early life ==
Lee Sun-kyun was born in Seoul on March 2, 1975. He attended the Korea National University of Arts in 1994, and graduated in the first ever class of its School of Drama with a Bachelor of Fine Arts.

== Career ==
=== 2000–2012: Acting beginnings ===
Lee made his debut as the lead actor in the 2000 short film Psycho Drama. In 2001, he made his stage acting debut as Brad Majors in the stage musical The Rocky Horror Show, and his television debut in the sitcom Lovers.

Lee eventually achieved his breakthrough in 2007 with the critically lauded medical drama White Tower and the highly popular romantic series Coffee Prince. He was nominated for Best New Actor in Television during the 43rd Baeksang Arts Awards. Besides Coffee Prince, he worked with director Lee Yoon-jung two other times—in the sports-themed Taereung National Village in 2005, and in the slice-of-life drama Triple in 2009.

Despite his burgeoning fame, Lee then turned to low-budget arthouse films to polish his acting caliber. He appeared in films directed by Hong Sang-soo, such Night and Day, Lost in the Mountains, Oki's Movie, Nobody's Daughter Haewon and Our Sunhi. Hong had been renowned for his realistic portrayal of ordinary lives in his films. Lee also headlined Paju, for which he won the Best Actor award at the Las Palmas de Gran Canaria International Film Festival held in Spain. Film distributor Myung Film quoted the judging committee as handing Lee high points for portraying the anguish his character felt for loving his wife's younger sister.

Lee successfully shook off his "gentle" TV drama image in Pasta, where he played a brilliant-but-abrasive chef. The series' popularity made him a bankable romantic leading man. Petty Romance reunited him with his My Sweet Seoul co-star Choi Kang-hee, and one-upmanship action comedy Officer of the Year (also known as Arrest King) soon followed.

Lee showed his support for the revival of Drama Special (formerly Drama City) by starring in Our Slightly Risque Relationship (his acting was later recognized at the KBS Drama Awards). He continually defended the importance of the short drama format as a training ground for young talent, acknowledging its contribution to his own career.

=== 2012–2017: Rising success ===
In 2012, he starred in two consecutive well-reviewed big-screen hits—mystery thriller Helpless and romantic comedy All About My Wife. Reuniting with Pasta director Kwon Seok-jang, Lee played a trauma doctor in Golden Time. His third collaboration with Kwon was Miss Korea, a drama set amidst the IMF crisis in the 1990s.

Lee returned to the theater opposite wife Jeon Hye-jin in Mike Bartlett's stage play Love, Love, Love in 2013. The following year, he headlined the film A Hard Day, which screened at the Directors' Fortnight section of the 2014 Cannes Film Festival, and became a critically acclaimed sleeper hit at the box office.

In 2015, Lee starred in the courtroom drama film The Advocate: A Missing Body.

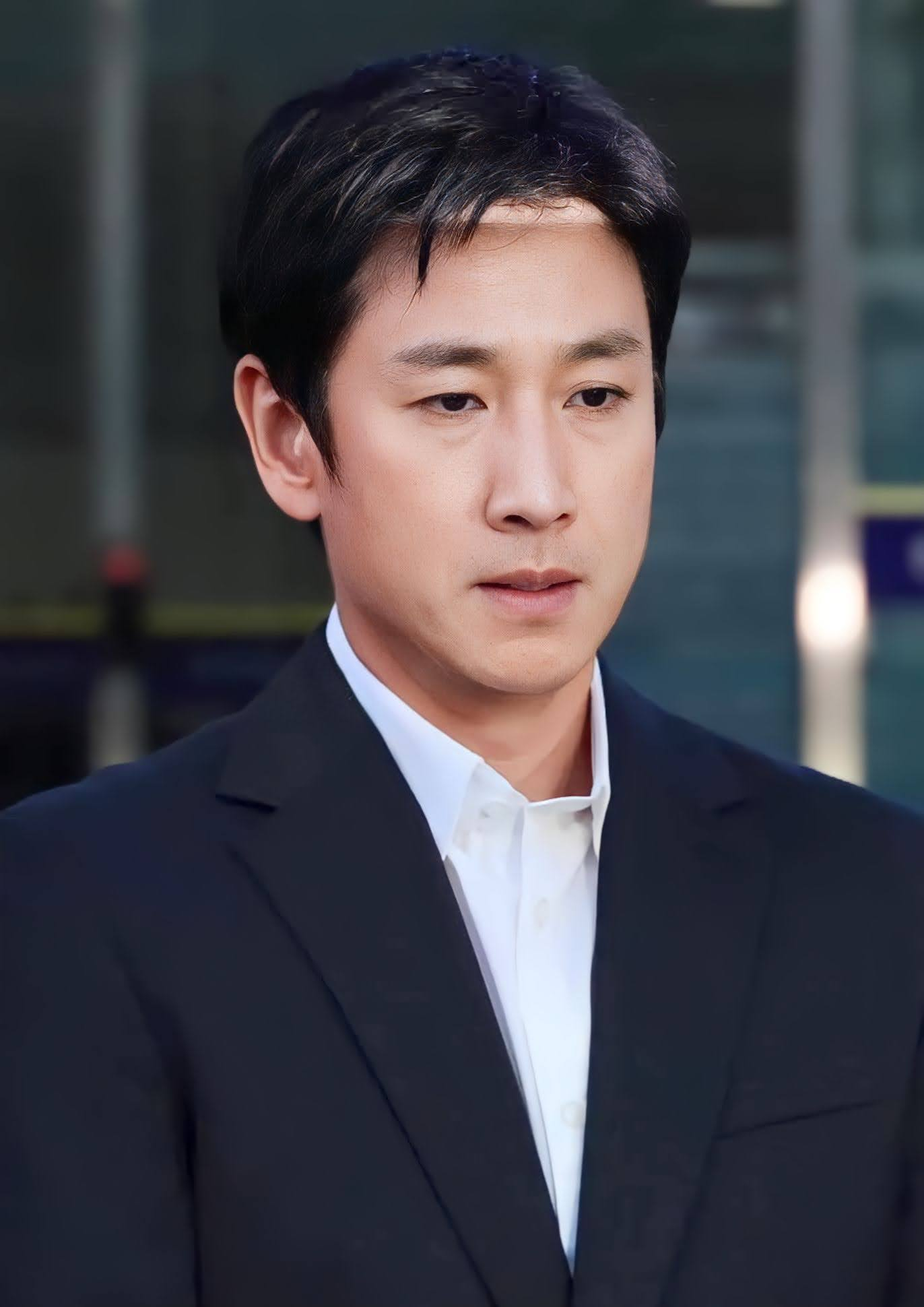
Lee in 2023

=== 2018–2023: Return to television and resurgence ===
In 2018, Lee starred in the critically acclaimed television series My Mister. The same year he starred in the action thriller film Take Point. In 2019, Lee starred in the legal television series Prosecutor Civil War.

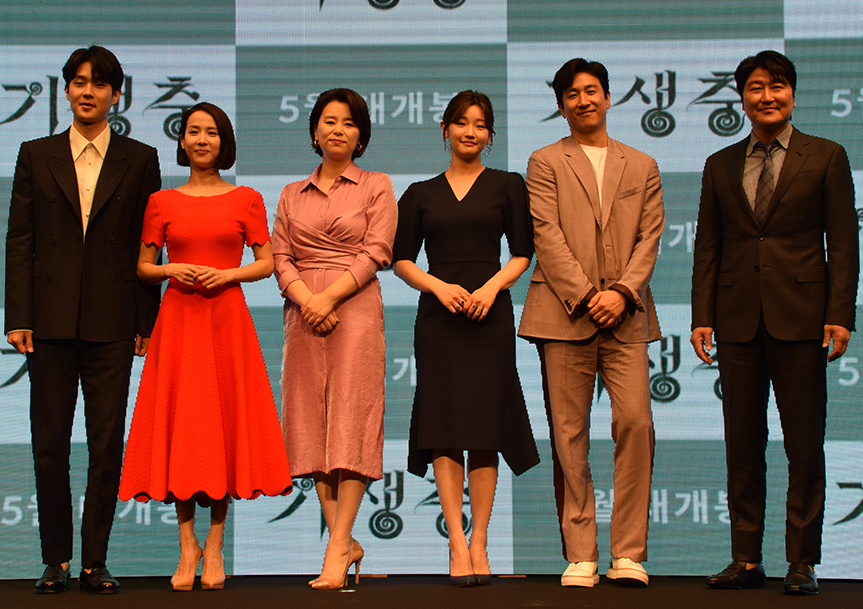
Lee (fifth from left) in April 2019 with Parasite cast

In 2019, Lee had a starring role in the critically acclaimed film Parasite as Park Dong-ik (Nathan; 박동익; Bak Dongik), the Park family father. Parasite was directed by Bong Joon-ho and became the first South Korean film to win the Palme d'Or as well as the Academy Award for Best Picture. The cast of Parasite, including Lee, also received an SAG Award for Outstanding Performance by a Cast in a Motion Picture.

In 2021, Lee played a neuroscientist trying to solve the mysterious death of his family by hacking into the brains of the deceased. Dr. Brain is the first Korean-language show produced for Apple TV+. As the drama series debut of renowned filmmaker Kim Jee-woon, the sci-fi thriller is based on the Korean webtoon of the same name. For his performance he was nominated for a Best Actor award for the 50th International Emmy Awards. The same year, Lee appeared in the political drama film Kingmaker as political strategist. He received a nomination for Best Actor for his role in the film at the 58th Baeksang Arts Awards; however, the award went to his costar Sul Kyung-gu.

In 2023, Lee starred alongside Lee Ha-nee (Honey Lee) in Lee Won-suk's comedy Killing Romance. While the film received a tepid reaction upon release, it has since become a cult favorite in Korea, and made its North American debut at the 22nd New York Asian Film Festival on July 14, 2023. In that same year, Lee also starred alongside Jung Yu-mi in the critically acclaimed horror film Sleep.

== Personal life and death ==
=== Marriage ===
Lee married his wife, actress Jeon Hye-jin, on May 23, 2009. Their agency announced that their first son was born on November 25, 2009. The couple's second son was born on August 9, 2011.

=== Drug use allegations ===
On October 19, 2023, it was revealed that Lee was booked for internal investigation over suspected drug use. As a result, he voluntarily dropped out of No Way Out, an upcoming thriller drama serial which just started its production days before the revelation of his alleged drug use. On October 24, he was charged on suspicion of using cannabis and psychoactive drugs, according to Incheon Metropolitan Police Agency, and was summoned for questioning on October 28. Lee was also given a travel ban to prevent him from leaving the country during the course of investigations. Initial test results of Lee's hair samples revealed that Lee tested negative for drugs, and further investigations were expected as of November 2023. Lee first requested the police to conduct an additional lie detector test through his lawyer. Lee contended that the accusations of drug use based only on hearsay with no physical evidence were unfair. After a third interrogation, which lasted over 19 hours, Lee admitted that he might have possibly taken drugs which were given to him by a hostess who he had been at a bar with, but said he was unaware that what he was given were illegal drugs, and that he had been deceived into doing so as part of a blackmail attempt. Due to Lee's public persona as a "family man", and South Korean society's high moral expectations of public figures and strong social disapproval of both infidelity and drug use, Lee and the investigation were heavily covered by South Korean media. The Korean opposition party questioned the coverage of Lee's suspected drug use, stating that it took public attention away from unfavorable developments involving the government and ruling People Power Party; member and Justice Minister Han Dong-hoon commented that "the drug use issue was unrelated to politics".

=== Death ===
On December 27, 2023, at 10:30 a.m., Lee was found dead at the age of 48 inside his car at the road parking lot nearby Waryong Park in central Seoul. In the passenger seat was a charcoal briquette commonly used in suicide via carbon monoxide poisoning in South Korea. The police earlier received a report from his wife that Lee had left home after "writing a memo akin to a suicide note". Lee's funeral was held at the funeral hall of Seoul National University Hospital, and he was buried on the 29th in Yeonhwajang, Suwon.

Lee's death came amidst multiple suspected suicides among South Korean celebrities, and an analysis article by CNN said it cast a spotlight on the high-pressure environment in South Korea's entertainment industry. Following Lee's death, a woman was arrested following allegations she had blackmailed him. Director Bong Joon-ho and other prominent figures demanded an inquiry into the role of South Korean media and police in Lee's death. On December 19, 2024, two women, a bar hostess surnamed Kim and a former actress surnamed Park who extorted ₩350 million (2023) (equivalent to ₩365.73 million or US$272,876.22 in 2025) from Lee were sentenced to 3.5 years and to 4 years and 2 months, respectively, with the judge stating that the extortion attempts had contributed to Lee's death.

== Filmography ==
=== Film ===
Year	Title	Role	Notes	Ref.
2000	Psycho Drama	Park Dong-woo	Short film	
2002	Make It Big	Woo Jung-chul		
2002	Surprise Party	the real Kim Jung-woo		
2002	A Perfect Match	Doctor		
2002	Boss X-File	Gangster		
2003	Goodbye Day		Short film	
2003	Scent of Love	Doctor Shin		
2003	Show Show Show	Sang-chul		
2003	Survival Meeting Game		Short film	
2004	Hitchhiking	Man	Short film	
2004	My Mother, the Mermaid	Do-hyeon		
2004	Love, So Divine	Man in lovey dovey couple		
2004	R-Point	Sergeant Park		
2005	Curry and Rice Story		Short film	
2005	Erotic Chaos Boy			
2006	The Customer Is Always Right	Lee Jang-gil		
2006	A Cruel Attendance	Cheon Man-ho		
2007	Our Town	Jae-shin		
2008	Night and Day	Yoon Kyeong-soo		
2008	Sa-kwa	Min-seok		
2008	Romantic Island	Kang Jae-hyuk		
2009	Lost in the Mountains	Myeong-woo	Short film	
2009	Paju	Kim Joong-shik		
2010	Oki's Movie	Nam Jin-gu		
2010	Petty Romance	Jeong Bae		
2011	Officer of the Year	Jung Eui-chan		
2012	Helpless	Jang Mun-ho		
2012	All About My Wife	Lee Doo-hyun		
2013	Nobody's Daughter Haewon	Lee Seong-joon		
2013	Our Sunhi	Mun-su		
2014	A Hard Day	Ko Gun-su		
2015	The Advocate: A Missing Body	Byeon Ho-sung		
2017	The King's Case Note	Yejong of Joseon		
2017	Man of Will	Go Jong	Cameo	
2017	A Special Lady	Im Sang-hoon		
2018	Take Point	Yoon Ji-eui		
2019	Jo Pil-ho: The Dawning Rage	Jo Pil-ho		
2019	Parasite	Park Dong-ik (Nathan)		
2020	Mr. Zoo: The Missing VIP	Black goat	Voice	
2022	Kingmaker	Seo Chang-dae		
2023	Killing Romance	Jonathan Na		
2023	Sleep	Hyun-soo		
2023	Project Silence	Cha Jung-won	Posthumous release	
2024	Land of Happiness	Park Tae-ju	Posthumous release; final film role	

=== Television series ===
Year	Title	Role	Notes
2002	Lovers	Lee Sun-kyun	
2003	Thousand Years of Love	Pil-ga	
2003	MBC Best Theater "Chakhan Dangshin Loveholic"		
2003	MBC Best Theater "Dad Romeo, Mom Juliet"		
2003	Drama City "18-year-old Bride"		
2004	Drama City "Semi-transparent"	Dong-soo	
2004	Drama City "Dr. Love"		
2005	Drama City "Love of a Spider Woman"		
2005	Drama City "Innocent Love"		
2005	Loveholic	Kim Tae-hyun	
2005	MBC Best Theater "Taereung National Village"	Lee Dong-kyung	
2006	Fugitive Lee Doo-yong	Noh Cheol-ki	
2006	MBC Best Theater "Behind"		
2007	Behind the White Tower	Choi Do-young	
2007	Coffee Prince	Choi Han-sung	
2008	My Sweet Seoul	Kim Young-soo	
2009	Triple	Jo Hae-yoon	
2010	Pasta	Choi Hyun-wook	
2010	Our Slightly Risque Relationship	Ki Dong-chan	Drama special
2012	Golden Time	Lee Min-woo	
2013	Miss Korea	Kim Hyung-joon	
2016	Listen to Love	Do Hyun-woo	
2016	Don't Dare to Dream	Na-ri's blind date (Voice)	Cameo (ep. 15)
2018	My Mister	Park Dong-hoon	
2019	Diary of a Prosecutor	Lee Seon-woong	
2021	Dr. Brain	Se-won	
2023	Payback: Money and Power	Eun Yong	

=== Television shows ===
Year	Title	Role	Ref.
2013	March: A Story of Friends	Cast member	
2019	Trans-Siberian Pathfinders	Cast member	
2023	Very Private Southeast Asia	Cast member	

=== Music videos ===
Year	Song title	Artist
1999	"It's OK"	Bijou
2001	"You Remain in My Heart"	Lucid Fall
2007	"Arirang"	SG Wannabe
2008	"Between Hidden Time"	Yoon Gun
2012	"Deep Night Sad Song"	E2RE

== Stage credit ==
=== Theater ===
Theater play performances
Year	Title		Role	Theater	Date	Ref.
Year	English	Korean	Role	Theater	Date	Ref.
2005	Indangsu Love Song	인당수 사랑가		Valentine's Theatre 3	April 22 to September 11	
2013	Love, Love, Love	러브 러브 러브	Kenneth	Myeongdong Arts Theatre	March 27 to April 21	

=== Musical ===
Musical performances
Year	Title		Role	Theater	Date	Ref.
Year	English	Korean	Role	Theater	Date	Ref.
2001	The Rocky Horror Show	록키 호러 쇼	Brad Majors	the Polymedia Theater in Dongsung-dong	July 17 to August 26	
2003	Grease	그리스	Danny Zuko	Dongsung Art Centre Dongsung Hall	August to November 16	

== Discography ==
Title	Year	Album
"Ocean Voyage (Choi Han-sung version)"	2007	Coffee Prince OST
"My Sweet City"	2008	My Sweet Seoul OST
"Romantic Christmas" (with Eugene)	2008	Romantic Island Christmas Story single
"Boy" (with Yoon Sang)	2008	Song Book: Play With Him album
"Kangaroo" (with Choi Kang-hee)	2010	Petty Romance OST
"Gift for You" (with Choi Kang-hee, Song Ji-hyo and Kim Byung-man)	2011	Non-album single

== Accolades ==
=== Awards and nominations ===
Name of the award ceremony, year presented, category, nominee of the award, and the result of the nomination
Award ceremony	Year	Category	Nominee / Work	Result	Ref.
APAN Star Awards	2018	Grand Prize (Daesang)	My Mister	Nominated	
Asian Pop-Up Cinema	2023	Award for Excellent Achievement in Film	Lee Sun-kyun	Won	
Baeksang Arts Awards	2007	Best New Actor – Television	White Tower	Nominated	
Baeksang Arts Awards	2015	Best Actor – Film	A Hard Day	Won	
Baeksang Arts Awards	2019	Best Actor – Television	My Mister	Nominated	
Baeksang Arts Awards	2022	Best Actor – Film	Kingmaker	Nominated	
Blue Dragon Film Awards	2014	Best Leading Actor	A Hard Day	Nominated	
Buil Film Awards	2014	Best Actor	A Hard Day	Nominated	
Busan International Film Festival	2024	Korean Film Achievement Award	Lee Sun-kyun (posthumous award)	Won	
CETV Awards	2010	Top 10 Asian Stars	Pasta	Won	
Chunsa Film Art Awards	2015	Best Actor	A Hard Day	Nominated	
Critics' Choice Awards	2020	Best Acting Ensemble	Parasite	Nominated	
Herald DongA TV Lifestyle Awards	2012	Best Dressed	Lee Sun-kyun	Won	
International Emmy Awards	2022	Best Performance by an Actor	Dr. Brain	Nominated	
KBS Drama Awards	2004	Best Actor in a One-Act/Drama Special	Dr. Love	Nominated	
KBS Drama Awards	2010	Best Actor in a One-Act/Drama Special	Our Slightly Risque Relationship	Won	
Korea Advertisers Association	2008	Good Model Award	Lee Sun-kyun	Won	
Las Palmas de Gran Canaria International Film Festival	2010	Best Actor	Paju	Won	
MBC Drama Awards	2007	Golden Acting Award, Actor in a Miniseries	White Tower	Won	
MBC Drama Awards	2007	Excellence Award, Actor	Coffee Prince	Nominated	
MBC Drama Awards	2010	Top Excellence Award, Actor	Pasta	Nominated	
MBC Drama Awards	2010	Best Couple Award	Lee Sun-kyun (with Gong Hyo-jin)	Won	
MBC Drama Awards	2012	Top Excellence Award, Actor in a Miniseries	Golden Time	Nominated	
MBC Drama Awards	2014	Excellence Award, Actor in a Miniseries	Miss Korea	Nominated	
Screen Actors Guild Awards	2020	Outstanding Performance by a Cast in a Motion Picture	Parasite	Won	
The Seoul Awards	2018	Best Actor (TV)	My Mister	Nominated	

=== State honors ===
Name of country, year given, and name of honor
Country Or Organization	Year	Honor Or Award	Ref.
South Korea (Note: Honors are given at the Korean Popular Culture and Arts Awards, arranged by the Korea Creative Content Agency and hosted by the Ministry of Culture, Sports and Tourism. They are awarded to those who have contributed to the arts and South Korea's pop culture.)	2018	Prime Minister's Commendation	

=== Listicles ===
Name of publisher, year listed, name of listicle, and placement
Publisher	Year	Listicle	Rank	Ref.
Korean Film Council	2021	Korean Actors 200 (Note: Introduces 200 actors that best represent the present and future of Korean cinema to the people in the film industry all over the world.)	Included	
The Screen	2019	2009–2019 Top Box Office Powerhouse Actors in Korean Movies	32nd	
