= Sleep (2023 film) =

2023 film by Jason Yu

- Theatrical release poster
- Hangul: 잠
- RR: Jam
- MR: Cham
- Directed by: Jason Yu
- Written by: Jason Yu
- Produced by: Lewis Tae-wan Kim
- Starring: Jung Yu-mi; Lee Sun-kyun
- Cinematography: Tae-soo Kim
- Edited by: Mee-yeon Han
- Music by: Hyuk-jin Chang; Yong-jin Chang
- Production company: Lewis Pictures
- Distributed by: Lotte Entertainment
- Release dates: 21 May 2023 (Cannes); 6 September 2023 (South Korea)
- Running time: 95 minutes
- Country: South Korea
- Language: Korean
- Box office: US$11.1 million

Sleep (Korean: 잠; RR: Jam) is a 2023 South Korean black comedy horror mystery thriller film written and directed by Jason Yu, in his feature debut. The film stars Jung Yu-mi and Lee Sun-kyun. It screened in the Critics' Week section at the 2023 Cannes Film Festival on 21 May 2023. It was released in South Korea on 6 September 2023. Lee died on 27 December 2023, making Sleep one of his final film appearances.

== Plot ==
Soo-jin, a pregnant woman, lives with her husband Hyeon-soo, who works as an actor. Hyeon-soo starts to exhibit concerning behavior while asleep, such as saying "someone's inside", scratching his face until bloody, and eating raw meat from the refrigerator. The couple sees a doctor, who diagnoses Hyeon-soo's sleep disorder, puts him on medication, and recommends remedying actions (such as abstaining from alcohol). All the while, Soo-jin's religious mother believes that something supernatural is afoot, and recommends seeking divine aid. One night, Hyeon-soo—while asleep—puts his and Soo-jin's Pomeranian in the freezer, killing it. Soo-jin discovers this, horrified.

Sometime later, Soo-jin gives birth, and becomes deeply concerned that Hyeon-soo will kill the baby in his sleep. Soo-jin becomes more convinced that her husband's condition is supernatural in nature, and consults a shaman named Madame Haegoong, who asserts that Hyeon-soo is possessed by a ghost. Soo-jin comes to believe that this "ghost" is Park Chun-gi, the recently-deceased father of her downstairs neighbor Min-jeong. Soo-jin spirals further into paranoia and concern.

One night, after Hyeon-soo returns home, Soo-jin confronts him and asserts that he is possessed by the ghost of Park Chun-gi, explaining this theory with various reasons and evidences. Soo-jin also reveals that she has kidnapped Min-jeong, and she threatens to kill Min-jeong with a power drill if the ghost of Park Chun-gi does not exit Hyeon-soo's body and progress into the afterlife. Hyeon-soo/Park acquiesces to Soo-jin's wishes, and Soo-jin and Hyeon-soo lie down on the floor together, exhausted by their ordeal. (It remains ambiguous as to whether a ghost possession was the real explanation for Hyeon-soo's behavior.)

== Cast ==
- Jung Yu-mi as Soo-jin
- Lee Sun-kyun as Hyeon-soo
- Kim Gook-hee as Min-jeong
- Lee Kyung-jin as Soo-jin's mother
- Yoon Kyung-ho as Doctor

== Production ==
=== Development ===
In October 2021, actors Jung Yu-mi and Lee Sun-kyun confirmed their casting as married couple Soo-jin and Hyeon-soo in a horror film written and directed by Jason Yu, and produced by Lewis Pictures.

Regarding the story, before turning it into a nightmare, Jason Yu was inspired by the moments when he was preparing to marry his girlfriend of seven years: "In writing, my goal was, initially, of course, to make a fun genre film. But, since my subject at the time was marriage, I also wanted to talk about married life." Yu explained: "At first, I was superficially curious about sleepwalking. Then, I wondered what the daily life would look like for a loved one who has to stay by the side of a sleepwalker." He also stated that sleep is a good subject for a horror movie, as "sleep is a state of complete surrender to your environment". Yu also stated that when he first created the character Soo-jin, he had Jung Yu-mi in mind as the perfect actress for the role.

During pre-production, Bong Joon-ho showed appreciation for Jason Yu's work. Yu had previously worked as Bong's assistant director during the production of his film Okja (2017). Bong strongly recommended Lee Sun-kyun to play the role of the husband, Hyeon-soo. In an interview after the film's premiere, Yu confessed, "While filming Sleep, I found myself, unconsciously and consciously, trying to imitate the image I had seen in Bong's Okja".

=== Filming ===
Principal photography concluded on 12 April 2022.

== Release ==
On 17 April 2023, Sleep was selected to be screened in the Critics' Week section at the 76th Cannes Film Festival where it had its world premiere on 21 May 2023. The screening took place at Espace Miramar, in the presence of Jason Yu, Jung Yu-mi and Lee Sun-kyun.

Distribution rights to the film were acquired by Lotte Entertainment, who released it in South Korea on 6 September 2023.

== Reception ==
=== Box office ===
As of 3 October 2024, the film has grossed US$10,490,192 at the local box office and accumulated 1,470,359 admissions.

=== Critical response ===
On the review aggregator website Rotten Tomatoes, the film holds an approval rating of 95% based on 76 reviews, with an average rating of 7.3/10. The website's critics consensus reads: "Elegantly executed, Sleep builds prosperously upon a familiar premise and delivers rousing chills." Metacritic, which uses a weighted average, assigned the film a score of 80 out of 100, based on 17 critics, indicating "generally favorable" reviews.

Reviewing the film following its Cannes premiere, Marilou Duponchel of Trois couleurs called it "a perfection of genre film where laughter and dread mingle. A profound and subtle reflection on married life". Jean-Baptiste Morain of Les Inrockuptibles called it "a very successful first feature film, somewhere between horror and comedy". Luc Chessel of Libération wrote, "Jason Yu distills a skilful atmosphere of anxiety". Singapore's national newspaper The Straits Times gave the film four stars out of five, and it praised the film for dealing with "mysterious nightly terrors packs in more scares than films twice as long".

Director Bong Joon-ho lauded the film as "the most unique horror film and the smartest debut film I've seen in 10 years".

=== Accolades ===
Award	Date of ceremony	Category	Recipient(s)	Result	Ref.
Baeksang Arts Awards	7 May 2024	Best New Director	Jason Yu	Nominated	
Baeksang Arts Awards	7 May 2024	Best Screenplay	Jason Yu	Won	
Baeksang Arts Awards	7 May 2024	Best Actress	Jung Yu-mi	Nominated	
Blue Dragon Film Awards	24 November 2023	Best Actress	Jung Yu-mi	Won	
Blue Dragon Film Awards	24 November 2023	Best New Director	Jason Yu	Nominated	
Blue Dragon Film Awards	24 November 2023	Best Editing	Han Mi-yeon	Nominated	
Buil Film Awards	3 October 2024	Best Film	Sleep	Nominated	
Buil Film Awards	3 October 2024	Best Actress	Jung Yu-mi	Nominated	
Buil Film Awards	3 October 2024	Best New Director	Jason Yu	Nominated	
Buil Film Awards	3 October 2024	Best Screenplay	Jason Yu	Nominated	
Cannes Film Festival	27 May 2023 (Note: The award ceremony of the 62nd Critics' Week was held on 24 May 2024.)	Critics' Week Grand Prix	Jason Yu	Nominated	
Cannes Film Festival	27 May 2023	Caméra d'Or	Jason Yu	Nominated	
Grand Bell Awards	15 November 2023	Best Film	Sleep	Nominated	
Grand Bell Awards	15 November 2023	Best Actress	Jung Yu-mi	Nominated	
Grand Bell Awards	15 November 2023	Best New Director	Jason Yu	Nominated	
Grand Bell Awards	15 November 2023	Best Screenplay	Jason Yu	Nominated	
Grand Bell Awards	15 November 2023	Best Music	Jang Hyuk-jin, Jang Yong-jin	Nominated	
Grand Bell Awards	15 November 2023	Best Sound	Gong Tae-won	Nominated	
Korean Film Producers Association Awards	7 December 2023	Best Actress	Jung Yu-mi	Won	
