= Peace Breaker (film) =

- Film poster
- Chinese: 破·局
- Hanyu Pinyin: Pòjú
- Directed by: Lien Yi-chi
- Written by: David Lin; Johnny Yu
- Based on: A Hard Day by Kim Seong-hun
- Produced by: Roy Hu
- Starring: Aaron Kwok; Wang Qianyuan; Liu Tao; Yu Ailei; Feng Jiayi; Zheng Kai
- Cinematography: Stephen James Lawes
- Edited by: Wenders Li
- Music by: Silence Wang; Yan Zhexi
- Production companies: C2M Pictures Co., LTD. J.Q. Pictures Company Limited; Shanghai Bona Cultural Media Co., LTD. Tianjin Jet Cloud Picture Media Co., LTD.
- Distributed by: Tianjin Jet Cloud Picture Media Co., LTD.
- Release date: 17 August 2017 (China)
- Running time: 112 minutes
- Country: China
- Language: Mandarin

Peace Breaker (Chinese: 破·局) is a 2017 Chinese action thriller film directed by Lien Yi-chi and written by David Lin and Johnny Yu, and starring Aaron Kwok, Wang Qianyuan, Liu Tao, Yu Ailei, Feng Jiayi, and Zheng Kai. It is a remake of Kim Seong-hun's A Hard Day. The film premiered in China on 17 August 2017.

== Plot ==
Gao Jianxiang (Aaron Kwok) is a Malaysian Chinese corrupt policeman in Kuala Lumpur. He kills a pedestrian on the way to his mother's funeral. To escape responsibility, in a moment of desperation, Gao hides the body in his trunk, and then his own mother's coffin. He thinks that his life could return to calmness, but unexpectedly, the pedestrian who was killed by him was a wanted man, and Gao is also eyed by the police. Shortly afterwards, a mysterious phone call is made to him. He realizes that all this is a conspiracy and he is already in deep trouble.

== Cast ==
- Aaron Kwok as Gao Jianxiang, a Malaysian Chinese policeman in Kuala Lumpur.
- Wang Qianyuan as Chen Changmin, a Malaysian Chinese policeman who is corrupt.
- Liu Tao as Lin Xiaoye, Gao Jianxiang's wife, they have a daughter named Weiwei.
- Yu Ailei
- Feng Jiayi as Captain Guo, Gao Jianxiang's superior.
- Zheng Kai

== Soundtrack ==
No.	Title	Lyrics	Music	Singer(s)	Length
1.	"Eating Dirt (吃土)" (Ending theme)	Silence Wong	Silence Wong	Silence Wong
2.	"Waiting for Your Return (等你回来)" (Promotion song)	Yan Zhexi	Yan Zhexi	Liu Tao

== Production ==
The film took place in Kuala Lumpur, Malaysia.

== Release ==
The film was originally to be released on August 18, 2017, but advanced to August 17.
