= Dr. Brain (TV series) =

2021 South Korean sci-fi web series

- Hangul: Dr. 브레인
- RR: Dr. Beurein
- MR: Dr. Pŭrein
- Created by: Kim Jee-woon
- Based on: Dr. Brain by Hongjacga
- Written by: Kim Jin A; Koh YoungJae; Lee Moo So; Kim Jee-woon
- Directed by: Kim Jee-woon
- Composer: Mowg
- Country of origin: South Korea
- Original language: Korean
- No. of seasons: 1
- No. of episodes: 6

Production
- Executive producers: Kim Jee-woon; Samuel Yeunju Ha; Jamie Yuan Lai; Ham Jung Yeub; Daniel Han; Joy Jinsoo Lee; Min Young Hong; Antonio H.W. Lee
- Cinematography: Kim Cheon-seok
- Editors: Yang Jin-mo; Han Mi-yeon
- Production companies: Bound Entertainment; Kakao Entertainment; Dark Circle Pictures; StudioPlex

Original release
- Network: Apple TV+
- Release: November 4 – December 9, 2021

Dr. Brain is a South Korean television series created by Kim Jee-woon. The sci-fi thriller is based on the Korean webtoon of the same name by Hongjacga. Lee Sun-kyun stars in the lead role as a brain scientist trying to solve the mysterious death of his family by hacking into the brains of the deceased. The series is the first Korean-language show produced for Apple TV+. It debuted on November 4, 2021, to accompany the streaming service's launch in South Korea.

On January 27, 2022, multiple official sources stated that the series would have a second season. However, Lee Sun-Kyon died on December 27, 2023 before it could ever happen.

== Premise ==
After losing his family in a mysterious accident, Sewon, a brilliant brain scientist, tries to solve what happened. He performs "brain syncs" with the deceased in order to search for clues hidden in their memories, but it becomes difficult to separate those memories from his own experiences.

== Cast ==
- Lee Sun-kyun as Sewon Koh, the brain scientist
- Lee Yoo-young as Jaeyi Jung, Sewon's wife
- Park Hee-soon as Kangmu Lee, a private investigator
- Seo Ji-hye as Jiun Choi, a lieutenant of an investigative unit
- Lee Jae-won as Namil Hong, Sewon's colleague
- Uhm Tae-goo
- Joo Min-kyung as Doctor

== Episodes ==
Season	Episodes	Originally released	
Season	Episodes	First released	Last released
1	6	November 4, 2021	December 9, 2021

=== Season 1 (2021) ===
No. overall	No. in season	Title	Directed by	Written by	Original release date
1	1	"Chapter 1"	Kim Jee-woon	Kim Jin A, Koh YoungJae, Kim Jee-woon	November 4, 2021
2	2	"Chapter 2"	Kim Jee-woon	Kim Jin A, Koh YoungJae, Kim Jee-woon	November 11, 2021
3	3	"Chapter 3"	Kim Jee-woon	Kim Jin A, Koh YoungJae, Kim Jee-woon	November 18, 2021
4	4	"Chapter 4"	Kim Jee-woon	Kim Jin A, Koh YoungJae, Kim Jee-woon	November 25, 2021
5	5	"Chapter 5"	Kim Jee-woon	Kim Jin A, Koh YoungJae, Kim Jee-woon	December 2, 2021
6	6	"Chapter 6"	Kim Jee-woon	Kim Jin A, Koh YoungJae, Kim Jee-woon	December 9, 2021

== Production and release ==
Director Kim Jee-woon had reportedly tried to adapt the Daum webtoon Dr. Brain, but it never went into production. In May 2019, however, he was able to go into series production with YG Studioplex. For a time, the project was developed under the working title Mr. Robin, and Lee Sun-kyun was offered the lead role in October 2020. Lee had signed on by March 2021 when Apple picked up the series as it was entering production, making it the first Korean-language series for its streaming service. In October 2021, Apple set a release date of November 4, 2021 to coincide with the launch of Apple TV+ in South Korea. Along with the release date, the rest of the main cast was revealed. The series consists of six episodes to be released on a weekly basis from the series debut through December 9, 2021.

On January 27, 2022, multiple official sources stated that the series would have a second season.

== Reception ==
The review aggregator website Rotten Tomatoes reported an 80% approval rating with an average rating of 7.7/10, based on 15 critic reviews. The website's critics consensus reads, "Working its way through a heady premise perhaps a little too ponderously, Dr. Brain nevertheless gives viewers plenty of cerebral thrills to mull over." Metacritic, which uses a weighted average, gave a score of 71 out of 100 based on 11 critics, indicating "generally favorable reviews".

=== Awards and nominations ===
Year	Award	Category	Recipient	Result	Ref.
2022	International Emmy Awards	Best Performance by an Actor	Lee Sun-kyun	Nominated	
