= Our Sunhi =

- Hangul: 우리 선희
- RR: Uri Seonhui
- MR: Uri Sŏnhŭi
- Directed by: Hong Sang-soo
- Written by: Hong Sang-soo
- Produced by: Kim Kyoung-hee
- Starring: Jung Yu-mi; Lee Sun-kyun; Kim Sang-joong; Jung Jae-young; Ye Ji-won; Lee Min-woo
- Cinematography: Park Hong-yeol
- Edited by: Hahm Sung-won
- Music by: Jeong Yong-jin
- Production company: Jeonwonsa Film Co.
- Distributed by: Finecut
- Release dates: August 9, 2013 (Locarno International Film Festival); September 12, 2013 (South Korea)
- Running time: 89 minutes
- Country: South Korea
- Language: Korean

Our Sunhi (Korean: 우리 선희) is a 2013 South Korean film written and directed by Hong Sang-soo. Hong won the Silver Leopard award for Best Director at the 66th Locarno International Film Festival.

== Plot ==
Sunhi (Jung Yu-mi) is a recent film school graduate who returns to her alma mater to solicit a recommendation letter from her former professor, Choi Donghyun (Kim Sang-joong), because she wishes to apply for a post-graduate course in America. At first Donghyun tries to dissuade her, stressing the value of practical experience over theory, but he finally agrees, with one caveat: He can only write an "honest" letter, and if it doesn't satisfy her, she is free not to use it. In the letter, Donghyun states that Sunhi is artistically inclined and a good person, but he also implies that she's introverted, weak and never shows her real mettle.

While grabbing a beer at a nearby fast food chicken restaurant, Sunhi calls her ex-boyfriend Munsu (Lee Sun-kyun) to join her. She wants to confront Munsu over a film he made based on their failed relationship. As the number of empty bottles between them keeps growing, it becomes apparent that Munsu still carries a torch for the pretty and smart if "slightly bizarre," as Munsu calls her, Sunhi. She turns him down, but won't say why, then leaves.

The next day, Sunhi returns to campus, resolved to use her flirtatious charms to wrest a more flattering recommendation letter from Donghyun. She succeeds, persuading him to write a new letter, in which Donghyun now insists that she was his favorite student.

Meanwhile, Munsu meets with his friend, curmudgeonly fellow filmmaker Jaehak (Jung Jae-young). Jaehak also happens to be a confidant of Donghyun's, and during another drinking session, he lends a sympathetic ear to Munsu's lovelorn laments. But when Jaehak later encounters Sunhi by chance, he too finds himself falling under her spell after she asks him out for coffee and drinks.

Though Sunhi remains something of a mystery, the three men all think they know who she is and what she needs, essentially depriving her of her right to privacy or a self-determined identity. All three men pursue the same woman without realizing it — until they all meet together in a climax set on the beautiful, autumnal-colored park grounds of Seoul's palace Changgyeonggung.

== Cast ==
- Jung Yu-mi as Wui Sunhi
- Lee Sun-kyun as Kim Munsu
- Kim Sang-joong as Choi Donghyun
- Jung Jae-young as Jaehak
- Ye Ji-won as Joohyun
- Lee Min-woo as Sangwoo

== Awards and nominations ==
Year	Award	Category	Recipient	Result
2013	66th Locarno International Film Festival	Best Director	Hong Sang-soo	Won
2013	14th Busan Film Critics Awards	Best Actress	Jung Yu-mi	Won
2013	14th Busan Film Critics Awards	Special Jury Prize	Hong Sang-soo	Won
2014	1st Wildflower Film Awards	Best Actress	Jung Yu-mi	Nominated
2014	50th Baeksang Arts Awards	Best Director	Hong Sang-soo	Nominated
2014	50th Baeksang Arts Awards	Best Supporting Actress	Ye Ji-won	Nominated
2014	23rd Buil Film Awards	Best Film	Our Sunhi	Nominated
2014	23rd Buil Film Awards	Best Director	Hong Sang-soo	Won
2014	23rd Buil Film Awards	Best Actress	Jung Yu-mi	Nominated
