= How the Lack of Love Affects Two Men =

- Theatrical release poster
- Directed by: Kim Seong-hun
- Written by: Cha Dae-seob; Choi In-beom; Kim Seong-hoon; Lee Hwang-rim; Sin Hyeon-jin
- Starring: Baek Yoon-sik; Bong Tae-gyu; Lee Hye-young
- Cinematography: Park Sang-hoon
- Edited by: Kim Sun-min
- Music by: Han Jae-kwon
- Distributed by: Lotte Entertainment
- Release date: November 16, 2006
- Running time: 110 minutes
- Country: South Korea
- Language: Korean
- Box office: US$2.5 million

How the Lack of Love Affects Two Men (Korean: 애정결핍이 두 남자에게 미치는 영향) is a 2006 South Korean comedy film directed by Kim Seong-hun, starring Baek Yoon-sik, Bong Tae-gyu, and Lee Hye-young. The film was released on November 16, 2006.

== Plot ==
Dong Chol-dong is a widower who lives with his only son, Dong-hyun. Chol-dong makes his living by blackmailing companies for their immoral activities, and in his spare time devotes himself to such activities as measuring the length of toilet paper, so he can sue the paper company if it is shorter than advertised. His son, Dong-hyun, is a bully who will go to any lengths to get what he wants. The lives of these two men take a turn when a divorced woman, Oh Mi-mi, rents a room in their house. Both fall in love with her, and they turn on each other to win her heart.

== Cast ==
- Baek Yoon-sik as Dong Chol-dong
- Bong Tae-gyu as Dong-hyun
- Lee Hye-young as Oh Mi-mi
- Ahn Gil-kang as bakery man
- Jung Woo as ignorant
- Do Yoon-joo as laundry man
- Kim Do-yeon as Miss Yang
- Woo Hyun as supermarket man
- Hwang Seok-jeong as supermarket woman

== Release ==
How the Lack of Love Affects Two Men was released in South Korea on 16 November 2006, and on its opening weekend topped the box office with 179,489 admissions. The film went on to receive a total of 593,277 admissions nationwide, with a gross (as of 26 November 2006) of $2,470,615.
