= Yoon Hee-seok =

South Korean actor

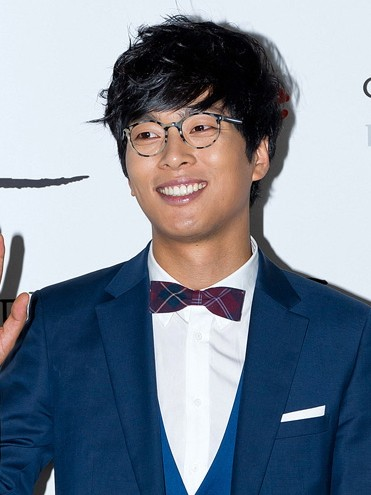
- Yoon in 2011
- Born: February 19, 1975 (age 51); Buyeo, South Chungcheong, South Korea
- Education: Korea National University of Arts - Theater; Hanyang University - Master's degree in Theater and Film
- Occupation: Actor
- Years active: 1996–present
- Spouse: Unknown (m. 2011)

Korean name
- Hangul: 윤희석
- RR: Yun Huiseok
- MR: Yun Hŭisŏk

Yoon Hee-seok (born February 19, 1975) is a South Korean actor.

== Filmography ==
=== Film ===
| Year | Title | Role | Notes |
|---|---|---|---|
| 2002 | Africa Africa | Man | Short film |
| 2002 | Understand? | Sung-woo's lover | Short film |
| 2003 | Heaven? Heaven! | Salaryman | Short film |
| 2006 | Ad-lib Night | Nam Taek-jong | |
| 2007 | The Old Garden | Joo Yong-jak | |
| 2008 | Hellcats | Choi Kyung-soo | |
| 2008 | Rabbit | Hee-seok | |
| 2009 | Cafe Noir | Man smoking at Seoul Land | |
| 2009 | After the Banquet | Park Kyung-ho | Telecinema |
| 2010 | Secret Reunion | Son Tae-soon | |
| 2010 | Come, Closer | Joo-young | |
| 2010 | Villain and Widow | Doctor Nam | Cameo |
| 2011 | Funny Neighbors | Jo Min-ki | |
| 2011 | Champ | In-kwon | |
| 2020 | Siho | Sung-jae | |

=== Television series ===
| Year | Title | Role | Network | Notes/Ref. |
|---|---|---|---|---|
| 2006 | 90 Days, Time to Love | Kim Tae-hoon | MBC | |
| 2007 | Drama City: "Cho Yong-pil in Our Memories" | Ho-sang | KBS2 | |
| 2007 | Cruel Love | Kang Yong-ki's friend | KBS2 | |
| 2008 | HDTV Literature: "Spring, Spring Spring" | Byung-soo | KBS1 | |
| 2008 | You Stole My Heart | Kang Woo-jin | KBS2 | |
| 2008 | My Sweet Seoul | Heo Chan-seok | SBS | |
| 2008 | Four Colours of Love: "Persistent Love's Form of Prohibition" | Park Jae-min | KBS2 | Episode 3 |
| 2009 | Hometown of Legends: "Forbidden Book" | Jeong-hee | KBS2 | Episode 6 |
| 2010 | Grudge: The Revolt of Gumiho | Village leader Jo | KBS2 | |
| 2010 | KBS Drama Special: "Boy Meets Girl" | Jo Hyun-choo | KBS2 | |
| 2010 | Jungle Fish 2 | Teacher Jung In-woo | KBS1 | |
| 2011 | Twinkle Twinkle | Nam Sung-woo | MBC | |
| 2011 | Baby Faced Beauty | Noh Yong-joon | KBS2 | |
| 2012 | Moon Embracing the Sun | Hong Gyu-tae | MBC | |
| 2012 | Dream High 2 | Shin Jae-in | KBS2 | |
| 2012 | Angel's Choice | Park Sang-ho | MBC | |
| 2012 | The King's Doctor | Seo Doo-shik | MBC | |
| 2013 | Two Weeks | Do Sang-hoon | MBC | |
| 2013 | The Suspicious Housekeeper | Department head Choi | SBS | |
| 2013 | Shining Romance | Byun Tae-shik | MBC | |
| 2014 | Gunman in Joseon | Kim Ok-kyun | KBS2 | |
| 2015 | Enchanting Neighbor | Seo Bong-gook | SBS | |
| 2015 | All About My Mom | Song Joon-young | KBS2 | |
| 2016 | Tomorrow Boy | Moneylender | Naver TV Cast | |
| 2016 | I Love You, Customer | Kang Hyun-sa | Naver TV Cast | |
| 2017 | Queen of Mystery | Kim Ho-chul | KBS2 | |
| 2017 | Temperature of Love | Min Daniel | SBS | |
| 2018 | Less Than Evil | Jo Doo-jin | MBC | |
| 2019 | Welcome to Waikiki 2 | | JTBC | Episode 12 |
| 2019 | Pegasus Market | Go Il-young | tvN | |
| 2020 | Touch | Yang Se-joon | Channel A | |
| 2020 | Flower of Evil | Kim Sang-jin | tvN | |
| 2021 | Uncle | Min Kyung-soo | TV Chosun | |

=== Music video appearances ===
| Year | Song title | Artist |
|---|---|---|
| 2000 | "Fail Roar" | Crash |
| 2000 | "Prayer" | Harlequin |
| 2002 | "Love" | Ji Young-sun |

== Theater ==
| Year | Title | Role |
|---|---|---|
| 1996 | The Steadfast Tin Soldier | |
| 1997 | The Pelican | |
| 1997 | 그 춤 또 한번 그 춤 | |
| 1998 | Proposal | |
| 1998 | Terminal | |
| 1999 | Heavy Water | |
| 1999 | The Clouds | |
| 2001 | Noel's Wish | |
| 2001 | Ya-ho! Let's Take a Bus | |
| 2001 | The Rocky Horror Show | |
| 2005 | Grease | Danny Zuko |
| 2009 | Dae Jang Geum - Season 2 | Min Jeong-ho |
| 2009 | Hedwig and the Angry Inch | Hedwig |
| 2013 | Gloomy Day 19260804 | Kim Woo-jin |
| 2014 | Brothers Were Brave | Lee Seok-bong |
| 2016 | Casa Valentina | George/Valentina |
| 2017 | That Summer, Zoo | Kim Chang-gi |

== Awards and nominations ==
| Year | Award | Category | Nominated work | Result |
|---|---|---|---|---|
| 2007 | 15th Chunsa Film Art Awards | Best New Actor | The Old Garden | Nominated |
| 2008 | KBS Drama Awards | Excellence Award, Actor in a Daily Drama | You Stole My Heart | Nominated |
| 2008 | KBS Drama Awards | Excellence Award, Actor in a One-Act/Special/Short Drama | Spring, Spring Spring, Things We Do That We Know We Will Regret | Won |
