= A Hard Day =

- Theatrical release poster
- Hangul: 끝까지 간다
- Lit.: Take It to the End
- RR: Kkeutkkaji ganda
- MR: Kkŭtkkaji kanda
- Directed by: Kim Seong-hun
- Written by: Kim Seong-hun
- Produced by: Cha Ji-hyeon; Jang Won-seok
- Starring: Lee Sun-kyun; Cho Jin-woong
- Cinematography: Kim Tae-seong
- Edited by: Kim Chang-ju
- Music by: Mok Young-jin
- Production companies: AD406; Dasepo Club
- Distributed by: Showbox
- Release dates: May 18, 2014 (Cannes); May 29, 2014 (South Korea)
- Running time: 111 minutes
- Country: South Korea
- Language: Korean
- Box office: US$24.1 million

A Hard Day (Korean: 끝까지 간다; RR: Kkeutkkaji ganda; lit. 'Take It to the End') is a 2014 South Korean action thriller film written and directed by Kim Seong-hun, and starring Lee Sun-kyun and Cho Jin-woong. It was selected to compete in the Directors' Fortnight section of the 2014 Cannes Film Festival.

== Plot ==
Ko, a corrupt detective whose mother recently dies, learns that his squad is being investigated by internal affairs for bribery. As he drives from his mother's funeral to the station, he crashes into a homeless man wandering onto the road, killing him. Fearing manslaughter charges as he is intoxicated, Ko decides against calling the police and hides the body in his car trunk (just in time as a patrol car drives by). He returns to the funeral and hides the body inside his mother's coffin, only to realize later that the man's cell phone is still in the coffin. A few days later, to Ko and his squad's relief, the internal affairs' investigation is cancelled by a lieutenant named Park.

Ko's squad is then assigned to locate and arrest a wanted murderer named Lee, who Ko recognizes as the homeless man. While searching Lee's hideout, the squad meets a police officer who is investigating a hit-and-run incident. Lee's hideout is right next to the site of the collision, in view of a traffic camera. The squad examines the low-quality camera footage, noting that the model of the colliding car is the same as Ko's. The triangulation of Lee's phone points to the area near Ko's mother's grave.

It is revealed that the driver of the patrol car who drove past Ko after he killed Lee was Park, the lieutenant who shut down the investigation into Ko's team. Although he witnessed Ko's collision, Park doesn't know where the body was. Instead of formally reporting Ko, Park blackmails him and demands possession of the body. Ko excavates the coffin, searches Lee and discovers bullet wounds on his body. Lee's cell phone receives a call from another criminal, whom Ko tracks down and interrogates. The criminal reveals that Park stole a large amount of confiscated cocaine. However, after storing his profits in a private vault, Lee stole the key and escaped. Park shot Lee and was chasing him when he was hit by Ko's car. When asked about the key, Ko finds out that anything important was always kept with Lee on his body.

Ko returns to the grave site and locates the key, but is arrested by his subordinate, who tailed him after discovering that Ko's car was damaged immediately after the time of Lee's death. The subordinate is killed when Park uses a crane to drop a shipping container onto his car. Ko gets ready to report on Park and turn in himself as well, but Park threatens to kill Ko's sister and daughter. Ko steals an explosive from the police basement and inserts it into Lee's body. He gives the body to Park and detonates the explosive, blasting Park's van off a bridge into a lake. Ko returns to his apartment and gets ready to report his crimes, but is attacked by Park, who survived the explosion. Park accidentally shoots and kills himself while trying to dislodge a revolver from a fallen bookshelf. Senior police officials decide to cover up Park's and Ko's crimes to protect their own reputations. Ko chooses to resign, and accesses Park's private vault using the key from Lee's body. He discovers an enormous reserve of cash, more than he could have imagined.

== Cast ==
- Lee Sun-kyun as Detective Ko Gun-su
- Cho Jin-woong as Lieutenant Park Chang-min
- Shin Jung-geun as Chief
- Jung Man-sik as Detective Choi Sang-ho
- Shin Dong-mi as Gun-su's younger sister
- Kim Dong-young as Detective Do Hee-chul
- Park Bo-gum as Officer Lee Jin-ho
- Joo Seok-tae as Detective Nam
- Heo Jung-eun as Mina
- Lee Jae-won as Jo Neung-hyun
- Jo Ha-seok as Lee Gwang-min
- Yoo Soon-woong as Funeral home director
- Lee Jang-yoo as Coffin rites instructor
- Jung Woo-hyuk as Funeral home security guard
- Byun Jung-hye as Funeral home female employee
- Jang In-sub as Officer Lee Dong-yun
- Bae Yoo-ram as Officer Shin Hyun-jin
- Kim Kyung-beom as Senior officer at DUI checkpoint
- Kim Seung-hoon as Taxi driver
- Kim Kang-hyun as Young-chul
- Song Young-gyu as Team leader of internal affairs
- Lee Ji-hoon as Officer in charge of police armory
- Nam Kyeong-eup as High ranking police official
- Kim Hae-gon as Piggybank owner
- Baek Jong-hwan as Piggybank employee

== Reception ==
The film debuted to stellar reviews at the 2014 Cannes Film Festival in the Director's Fortnight sidebar, where it was praised by critics as a well-made thriller with unrelenting suspense and flashes of humor. Upon its release in South Korea on May 29, 2014, at first it didn't attract much attention or hype, with a lackluster 80,000 ticket sales on its opening day. But through strong word of mouth from viewers, A Hard Day began an unexpectedly popular run at the box office, placing second place for four weeks behind Hollywood blockbusters X-Men: Days of Future Past and Edge of Tomorrow. It also outperformed other local noir thrillers with bigger stars, such as Man on High Heels and No Tears for the Dead. A Hard Day quickly reached its break-even point, garnering 1.6 million admissions 11 days after its release, and by its sixth week had drawn 3.08 million admissions. At the end of its run, A Hard Day had grossed US$24,171,936 from 3,450,305 tickets sold.

== Awards and nominations ==
| Year | Award | Category | Recipient | Result |
|---|---|---|---|---|
| 2014 | 23rd Buil Film Awards | Best Actor | Lee Sun-kyun | Nominated |
| 2014 | 23rd Buil Film Awards | Best Supporting Actor | Cho Jin-woong | Nominated |
| 2014 | 23rd Buil Film Awards | Best New Director | Kim Seong-hun | Nominated |
| 2014 | 23rd Buil Film Awards | Best Screenplay | Kim Seong-hun | Nominated |
| 2014 | 34th Korean Association of Film Critics Awards | Critics' Top 10 | A Hard Day | Won |
| 2014 | 51st Grand Bell Awards | Best Film | A Hard Day | Nominated |
| 2014 | 51st Grand Bell Awards | Best Director | Kim Seong-hun | Won |
| 2014 | 51st Grand Bell Awards | Best Supporting Actor | Cho Jin-woong | Nominated |
| 2014 | 51st Grand Bell Awards | Best Screenplay | Kim Seong-hun | Nominated |
| 2014 | 51st Grand Bell Awards | Best Cinematography | Kim Tae-seong | Won |
| 2014 | 51st Grand Bell Awards | Best Editing | Kim Chang-ju | Nominated |
| 2014 | 51st Grand Bell Awards | Best Lighting | Kim Gyeong-seok | Won |
| 2014 | 15th Busan Film Critics Awards | Best Screenplay | Kim Seong-hun | Won |
| 2014 | 15th Women in Film Korea Awards | Technical Award | Oh So-ra (sound designer) | Won |
| 2014 | 1st Korean Film Producers Association Awards | Best Film | A Hard Day | Won |
| 2014 | 1st Korean Film Producers Association Awards | Best Director | Kim Seong-hun | Won |
| 2014 | 1st Korean Film Producers Association Awards | Best Editing | Kim Chang-ju | Won |
| 2014 | 35th Blue Dragon Film Awards | Best Film | A Hard Day | Nominated |
| 2014 | 35th Blue Dragon Film Awards | Best Director | Kim Seong-hun | Nominated |
| 2014 | 35th Blue Dragon Film Awards | Best Actor | Lee Sun-kyun | Nominated |
| 2014 | 35th Blue Dragon Film Awards | Best Supporting Actor | Cho Jin-woong | Won |
| 2014 | 35th Blue Dragon Film Awards | Best Screenplay | Kim Seong-hun | Won |
| 2014 | 35th Blue Dragon Film Awards | Best Cinematography | Kim Tae-seong | Nominated |
| 2014 | 35th Blue Dragon Film Awards | Best Editing | Kim Chang-ju | Won |
| 2014 | 35th Blue Dragon Film Awards | Best Lighting | Kim Gyeong-seok | Nominated |
| 2015 | 6th KOFRA Film Awards | Best Director | Kim Seong-hun | Won |
| 2015 | 10th Max Movie Awards | Best Supporting Actor | Cho Jin-woong | Won |
| 2015 | 20th Chunsa Film Art Awards | Best Director (Grand Prix) | Kim Seong-hun | Won |
| 2015 | 20th Chunsa Film Art Awards | Best Actor | Lee Sun-kyun | Nominated |
| 2015 | 20th Chunsa Film Art Awards | Best Screenplay | Kim Seong-hun | Nominated |
| 2015 | 20th Chunsa Film Art Awards | Technical Award | | Nominated |
| 2015 | 9th Asian Film Awards | Best Supporting Actor | Cho Jin-woong | Nominated |
| 2015 | 9th Asian Film Awards | Best Screenwriter | Kim Seong-hun | Nominated |
| 2015 | 9th Asian Film Awards | Best Editor | Kim Chang-ju | Nominated |
| 2015 | 51st Baeksang Arts Awards | Best Film | A Hard Day | Nominated |
| 2015 | 51st Baeksang Arts Awards | Best Director | Kim Seong-hun | Won |
| 2015 | 51st Baeksang Arts Awards | Best Actor | Lee Sun-kyun | Won |
| 2015 | 51st Baeksang Arts Awards | Best Actor | Cho Jin-woong | Won |
| 2015 | 51st Baeksang Arts Awards | Best Screenplay | Kim Seong-hun | Nominated |

== Remakes ==
The film has been remade in China as Peace Breaker (2017), in the Philippines as A Hard Day with Dingdong Dantes and John Arcilla in 2021, in France as Restless (2022), and in Japan as Hard Days (2023). In 2020, Indian actor Shah Rukh Khan and his company Red Chillies Entertainment bought the rights to a Hindi-language remake of the film. A 26-chapter webtoon adaptation was exclusively serialized on Manta from September 18 to December 20, 2022.
