= Oki's Movie =

- Hangul: 옥희의 영화
- Hanja: 옥희의 映畫
- RR: Okhuiui yeonghwa
- MR: Okhŭiŭi yŏnghwa
- Directed by: Hong Sang-soo
- Written by: Hong Sang-soo
- Produced by: Kim Kyeong-hee
- Starring: Lee Sun-kyun; Jung Yu-mi; Moon Sung-keun
- Cinematography: Park Hong-yeol; Ji Yoon-jeong
- Edited by: Hahm Sung-won
- Music by: We Zong-Yun
- Production company: Jeonwonsa Films
- Distributed by: Sponge Entertainment
- Release date: September 16, 2010
- Running time: 80 minutes
- Country: South Korea
- Language: Korean

Oki's Movie (Korean: 옥희의 영화; RR: Okhuiui yeonghwa) is a 2010 South Korean drama film written and directed by Hong Sang-soo.

In a multipart narrative divided into four chapters, Hong fashions a new kind of love triangle. Oki is a young and beautiful college student majoring in film production and torn between the affections of two men: an older cinema professor and a former student/budding filmmaker. As the story shifts perspectives and timelines, Hong depicts each relationship with the authentically awkward rhythms of real life.

== Plot ==
A Day for Incantation (주문을 외울날): In Seoul, winter, the present day. On his way to a screening of one of his films, struggling shorts director Nam Jin-gu (Lee Sun-kyun) is nagged by his wife Jang Su-yang (Seo Yeong-hwa) about his drinking, and he wonders if she is having an affair with a guy called Yeong-su. Nam's onetime professor at film school, Song (Moon Sung-keun), tells him that filmmaking as an art is now dead. At a dinner with film-school staff, Nam gets drunk and into a quarrel with Song, about whom he's heard a disquieting rumor. Afterwards, at the Q&A for his film, Nam is asked by a member of the audience (Lee Chae-eun) whether it's true he was dating the actress at the time and is therefore responsible for ruining her life. Nam says he has quit directing.

King of Kisses (키스왕): Some years earlier, Nam sees fellow student Jung Ok-heui (Jung Yu-mi) at film school and tries to go out with her, claiming he's never dated a woman before. When they smooch in a greenhouse, she says he's a good kisser. She's still getting over a relationship with an older man but finally gives in to Nam's persistence, and they sleep together and date.

After the Snowstorm (폭설 후): Following a heavy bout of snow, only Nam and Jung turn up one day for Prof. Song's class, and the three end up talking about relationships. Song has already decided to quit teaching.

Oki's Movie (옥희의 영화): Jung narrates her own short movie based on her relationships with two guys, an "older man" and a "younger man", with whom she separately went walking with one winter on Mt. Acha, south of Seoul.
