= Listen to Love =

2016 South Korean television series

- Promotional poster
- Also known as: My Wife Is Having an Affair This Week
- Hangul: 이번 주, 아내가 바람을 핍니다
- Lit.: This Week, My Wife's Having an Affair
- RR: Ibeon ju, anaega barameul pimnida
- MR: Ibŏn chu, anaega paramŭl p'imnida
- Genre: Romance; Melodrama; Family
- Written by: Kim Hyo-sin; Lee Nam-gyu; Lee Ye-rim
- Directed by: Kim Seok-yoon
- Starring: Lee Sun-kyun; Song Ji-hyo; BoA; Lee Sang-yeob; Kim Hee-won; Ye Ji-won
- Country of origin: South Korea
- Original language: Korean
- No. of episodes: 12

Production
- Executive producers: Ham Young-hoon; Choi Joon-hyeong
- Producers: Jung Sung-soon; Park Jun-seo
- Running time: 70 minutes
- Production company: Drama House Studio

Original release
- Network: JTBC
- Release: October 28 – December 3, 2016

Listen to Love (Korean: 이번 주, 아내가 바람을 핍니다) is a 2016 South Korean television series starring Lee Sun-kyun and Song Ji-hyo about husbands who try to protect their marriage with the help of anonymous netizens, based on the 2007 Japanese TV series of the same title. It aired on JTBC from October 28 to December 3, 2016, every Friday and Saturday at 20:30 (KST) for 12 episodes.

== Synopsis ==
Do Hyun-woo (Lee Sun-kyun), a ten-year veteran producer, believes that his wife Jung Soo-yeon (Song Ji-hyo) is having an affair. They have been married for eight years in what he believed was a strong relationship, until he catches on to a sign that his wife is on the verge of cheating. This pushes him to talk with anonymous people on online social networks to figure out what to do and try to save his marriage.

== Cast ==
=== Main ===
- Lee Sun-kyun as Do Hyun-woo / Toycrane (username)
- Song Ji-hyo as Jung Soo-yeon
- Kim Hee-won as Choi Yoon-gi
- Ye Ji-won as Eun Ah-ra
- Lee Sang-yeob as An Joon-young
- BoA as Kwon Bo-young

=== Supporting ===
- Lee Do-yeon as Yoon-gi's secretary
- Ye Soo-jung as Hyun-woo's mother
- Kim Kang-hoon as Do Joon-soo
- Lee Seok-jun as Ji Seon-woo
- Han Seo-jin as Yoon-gi's secret mistress
- Park Soo-young as Park Young-soo
- Jung A-in as Jung Eun-jung
- Jung Ji-ahn as Kim Mi-ha
- Shim Hee-sub as Lee Ji-hoon
- Lee Su-woong as Kang Seung-hyun
- Kim Young-ok
- Lee Do-yeop as Hyun Chan
- Kim Hye-ok as Myunmokdongok (username)
- Woo Hyun as Hanganggabshida (username)
- Jo Jae-ryong as Bbinkkobeunseunim (username)
- Kim Sun-hwa as Doksoogongbangnyeo (username)
- Jang Liu as Wetoli (username)
- Lee Byung-jin as Nooneneunnoon (username)
- Kim Tae-woo as Hyoomungeubshigchoong (username)

==== Other ====
- Baek Bo-ram

=== Special appearances ===
- Eun Ji-won
- Kang Ho-dong
- Jung Yu-mi
- Lee Hwi-jae
- Ki Tae-young

== Ratings ==
Ep.	Original broadcast date	Average audience share (Nationwide)	
Ep.	Original broadcast date	Nielsen Korea	TNmS
1	October 28, 2016	2.653%	2.1%
2	October 29, 2016	2.119%	1.9%
3	November 4, 2016	2.647%	2.3%
4	November 5, 2016	2.732%	2.6%
5	November 11, 2016	3.072%	2.4%
6	November 12, 2016	2.510%	2.0%
7	November 18, 2016	3.351%	2.5%
8	November 19, 2016	3.077%	2.6%
9	November 25, 2016	3.340%	2.6%
10	November 26, 2016	2.805%	2.7%
11	December 2, 2016	2.517%	2.6%
12	December 3, 2016	3.047%	2.8%
Average		2.823%	2.4%
In the table above, the blue numbers represent the lowest ratings and the red numbers represent the highest ratings.; This series aired on a cable channel/pay TV which normally has a relatively smaller audience compared to free-to-air TV/public broadcasters (KBS, SBS, MBC and EBS).
