= Live (South Korean TV series) =

2018 South Korean television series

- Promotional poster
- Hangul: 라이브
- RR: Raibeu
- MR: Raibŭ
- Genre: Drama; Police procedural
- Created by: Studio Dragon
- Written by: Noh Hee-kyung
- Directed by: Kim Kyu-tae
- Starring: Jung Yu-mi; Lee Kwang-soo; Bae Seong-woo; Bae Jong-ok
- Country of origin: South Korea
- Original language: Korean
- No. of episodes: 18

Production
- Executive producer: Kim Kyu-tae
- Camera setup: Single-camera
- Running time: 60 mins
- Production company: GTist

Original release
- Network: tvN
- Release: March 10 – May 6, 2018

Live (Korean: 라이브) is a 2018 South Korean television series starring Jung Yu-mi, Lee Kwang-soo, Bae Seong-woo and Bae Jong-ok. It aired on tvN from March 10 to May 6, 2018 every Saturday and Sunday at 21:00 (KST).

== Synopsis ==
Live tells the story of police officers - from the lowest field cadets and patrol officers, to their superiors including corporals, captains, and more - as they form the 'Live' team at the Hongil patrol division. Each officer has their own story, and each works hard in their own places at one of the busiest, most stressful jobs in the world, in order to earn a living.

== Cast ==
=== Main ===
- Jung Yu-mi as Han Jung-oh
  - Park Han-sol as young Han Jung-oh

A female officer who copes with the everyday stresses of her personal and professional life. She tries to stay focused while her heart is torn between two colleagues.

- Lee Kwang-soo as Yeom Sang-soo
  - Oh Han-kyul as young Yeom Sang-soo

An ordinary man who, after being discharged from the military, joins the police force in an effort to have a normal life in mainstream society. However, he becomes an icon of misfortune with every case that he handles and runs into a conflict with a superior.

- Bae Seong-woo as Oh Yang-chon

A former Violent Crimes Unit Detective. He was promoted quickly to the rank of Captain after solving several violent crime cases, but he is demoted due to an unexpected incident and is thrown into difficulties at the patrol division.

- Bae Jong-ok as Ahn Jang-mi

Oh Yang-chon's wife, and another detective. She has past ties with Han Jung-oh, and goes through a rough patch with Yang-chon in their marriage.

=== Supporting ===
- Shin Dong-wook as Choi Myung-ho
- Lee Si-eon as Kang Nam-il
- Lee Joo-young as Song Hye-ri

A female officer who joined the same police academy with Sang-su and Jung-oh who also shares the same flat with Jung-oh and neighbors with Sang-su. Always wants to be like Sang-su and Jung-oh to receive major crimes to solve and gain fame but gets stuck with an old mentor who destroys her chances.

- Kim Gun-woo as Kim Han-pyo
- Sung Dong-il as Ki Han-sol
- Jang Hyun-sung as Eun Kyung-mo
- Lee Soon-jae as Oh Yang-chon's father
- Yeom Hye-ran as Sang-soo's mother
- Go Min-si as Oh Song-i - Oh Yang-chon's daughter
- Jeon Su-ji as Child's mother
- Choi Go as Boy from the Internet Cafe
- Lee Jin-kwon as Supporting

=== Guest roles ===
- Jeon Yeo-been as Kim Young-ji, Jung-oh's friend (ep.1)
- Hong Kyung as Yoo Man Yong (ep.9-11)
- Son Woo-hyeon as Special appearance

== Production ==
This is Noh Hee-kyung and Kim Kyu-tae's fifth collaboration; actor Lee Kwang-soo had previously worked with both Kim and Noh on It's Okay, That's Love and Noh on Dear My Friends.

The first script reading was held on November 16, 2017.

== Original soundtrack ==
Live OST

Soundtrack album by Various artists
- Genre: Soundtrack
- Language: Korean
- Labels: YAMYAM Entertainment kakao M

=== Part 1 ===
Released on March 24, 2018
No.	Title	Lyrics	Music	Artist	Length
1.	"Someone Like You"	Ji Hoon	Lee Yong-min; TLL	Exo-CBX	03:30
2.	"Someone Like You" (Inst.)		Lee Yong-min; TLL		03:30
Total length:					07:00

=== Part 2 ===
Released on March 25, 2018
No.	Title	Lyrics	Music	Artist	Length
1.	"At The End Of The Day There's You" (하루끝엔 그대가 있어요)	Ji Hoon	Rocoberry	Han Dong-geun	03:38
2.	"At The End Of The Day There's You" (Inst.)		Rocoberry		03:38
Total length:					07:16

=== Part 3 ===
Released on March 31, 2018
No.	Title	Lyrics	Music	Artist	Length
1.	"Because It's You" (그대니까요)	Ji Hoon	Rocoberry	Davichi	03:28
2.	"Because It's You" (Inst.)		Rocoberry		03:28
Total length:					06:56

=== Part 4 ===
Released on April 7, 2018
No.	Title	Lyrics	Music	Artist	Length
1.	"Why Why Why"	Ji Hoon	Rocoberry	Punch	03:15
2.	"Why Why Why" (Inst.)		Rocoberry		03:15
Total length:					06:30

== Viewership ==
Live : South Korea viewers per episode (millions)

Season	Episode number																		Average
Season	1	2	3	4	5	6	7	8	9	10	11	12	13	14	15	16	17	18	Average
1	1.154	0.906	1.029	1.417	1.166	1.229	1.243	1.351	1.254	1.540	1.539	1.733	1.758	1.823	1.652	1.773	1.572	1.790	1.441

Source: Audience measurement performed nationwide by Nielsen Media Research.

Average TV viewership ratings
Ep.	Original broadcast date	Average audience share		
Ep.	Original broadcast date	AGB Nielsen		TNmS
Ep.	Original broadcast date	Nationwide	Seoul	Nationwide
1	March 10, 2018	4.337% (1st)	4.857% (1st)	4.2%
2	March 11, 2018	3.293% (1st)	3.575% (1st)	3.3%
3	March 17, 2018	4.087% (1st)	5.079% (1st)	3.7%
4	March 18, 2018	5.832% (1st)	6.135% (1st)	5.1%
5	March 24, 2018	4.865% (1st)	5.578% (1st)	5.0%
6	March 25, 2018	5.067% (1st)	5.800% (1st)	5.1%
7	March 31, 2018	4.940% (1st)	5.924% (1st)	5.4%
8	April 1, 2018	5.457% (1st)	6.209% (1st)	4.6%
9	April 7, 2018	5.521% (1st)	6.423% (1st)	5.3%
10	April 8, 2018	6.083% (1st)	6.706% (1st)	6.2%
11	April 14, 2018	6.238% (1st)	7.162% (1st)	5.9%
12	April 15, 2018	6.653% (1st)	7.110% (1st)	6.9%
13	April 21, 2018	7.058% (1st)	8.618% (1st)	5.5%
14	April 22, 2018	6.802% (1st)	7.363% (1st)	6.5%
15	April 28, 2018	6.711% (1st)	8.068% (1st)	6.4%
16	April 29, 2018	7.047% (1st)	8.022% (1st)	6.9%
17	May 5, 2018	6.638% (1st)	7.615% (1st)	5.6%
18	May 6, 2018	7.730% (1st)	8.730% (1st)	7.4%
Average		5.798%	6.610%	5.5%
In this table, the blue numbers represent the lowest ratings and the red numbers represent the highest ratings.; The series aired on a cable channel/pay TV which normally has a relatively smaller audience compared to free-to-air TV/public broadcasters (KBS, SBS, MBC and EBS).

== Awards and nominations ==
Year	Award	Category	Recipient	Result	Ref.
2018	11th Korea Drama Awards	Top Excellence Award, Actress	Jung Yu-mi	Nominated	
2018	6th APAN Star Awards	Top Excellence Award, Actress in a Miniseries	Jung Yu-mi	Nominated	
2018	6th APAN Star Awards	Best Supporting Actor	Bae Seong-woo	Nominated	
2019	55th Baeksang Arts Awards	Best Supporting Actor (TV)	Bae Seong-woo	Nominated	
