= Come, Closer =

- Film poster
- Directed by: Kim Jong-kwan
- Written by: Kim Jong-kwan
- Produced by: Stanley Kwak
- Starring: Yoon Kye-sang; Jung Yu-mi; Yoon Hee-seok; Yozoh
- Cinematography: Kim Hwa-yeong
- Edited by: Kan Younghun
- Music by: Kim Tae-seong
- Production company: Indiestory Inc.
- Release date: October 28, 2010
- Running time: 108 minutes
- Country: South Korea
- Language: Korean

Come, Closer (Korean: 조금만 더 가까이; RR: Jogeumman deo gakkai) is a 2010 South Korean indie romance melodrama film. A directorial debut by Kim Jong-kwan and starring Yoon Kye-sang, Jung Yu-mi, Yoon Hee-seok and Yozoh, the full-length omnibus tells the love story of five couples. It made its debut at the 15th Busan International Film Festival in 2010.

== Synopsis ==
An omnibus film of the romances and breakups of five couples:

Soo-jin (Kim Hyo-seo) works in a cafe in Seoul. One day, she receives a call at work from a Polish man in Rotterdam, who tells her the story of his missing fiance.

Eun-hee (Jung Yu-mi) shows up one night and blames her ex-boyfriend Hyun-oh (Yoon Kye-sang) for ruining her life. Although she has a new relationship, she is still upset that Hyun-oh breaks up with her.

Se-yeon (Yeom Bo-ra) seduces Young-soo (Oh Chang-seok), who is rumoured to be dating a man. Young-soo's long-time lover Woon-chul (Jang Seo-won) is heartbroken when he makes a confession and decides to end their relationship.

Indie bandmates Hye-young (Yozoh) and Joo-young (Yoon Hee-seok) discuss about love while taking a walk in Namsan park.

== Cast ==
- Yoon Kye-sang as Hyun-oh
- Jung Yu-mi as Eun-hee
- Yoon Hee-seok as Joo-young
- Yozoh as Hye-young
- Jang Seo-won as Woon-chul
- Oh Chang-seok as Young-soo
- Kim Jung-heon as Yeong-soo's friend
- Yeom Bo-ra as Se-yeon
- Kim Hyo-seo as Soo-jin
