= Cafe Noir =

- Film poster
- Directed by: Jung Sung-il
- Screenplay by: Jung Sung-il
- Produced by: Kim Jong-won
- Starring: Shin Ha-kyun; Jung Yu-mi; Moon Jeong-hee; Kim Hye-na
- Cinematography: Kim Jun-young
- Edited by: Moon In-dae
- Music by: Lee Ji-yeon
- Production company: Polaris Production
- Release dates: September 2, 2009 (VIFF); December 30, 2010 (South Korea)
- Running time: 198 minutes
- Country: South Korea
- Language: Korean

Cafe Noir (Korean: 카페 느와르; RR: Kape neuwareu) is a 2009 South Korean romance melodrama film starring Shin Ha-kyun, Moon Jeong-hee, Kim Hye-na and Jung Yu-mi. Written and directed by first-time director Jung Sung-il, a well regarded film critic-turned-director, it is a contemplation on love and heartbreak largely based on two works of literature - Johann Wolfgang von Goethe's The Sorrows of Young Werther and Fyodor Dostoyevsky's White Nights. The critically acclaimed work debuted at the 66th Venice Film Festival in 2009, and Jung was nominated for New Talent Grand Pix at the 2010 Copenhagen International Film Festival.

== Synopsis ==
Young-soo (Shin Ha-kyun), a music teacher, has an affair with his student's mother, Mi-yeon (Moon Jeong-hee). He becomes desperate when Mi-yeon decides to end their relationship following the return of her husband (Lee Sung-min). He tries to kill the husband and when it fails, he realizes that for the happiness of the woman he loves, he must leave her.

Later, Young-soo meets a young woman Sun-hwa (Jung Yu-mi) by chance, who is waiting for her lover (Kim Sang-kyung) on the bridge for a year. He begins to see her every day and falls for her. Just when she decides to give up thinking that her lover does not love her anymore, he suddenly appears on the bridge. They leave together happily, leaving Young-soo behind.

== Cast ==
- Shin Ha-kyun as Young-soo
- Jung Yu-mi as Sun-hwa
- Moon Jeong-hee as Mi-yeon 1
- Kim Hye-na as Mi-yeon 2
- Lee Sung-min as Mi-yeon 1's husband
- Kim Sang-kyung as Sun-hwa's lover
- Yozoh as Shim Eun-ha
- Lee Yong-nyeo as Young-soo's mother / Fortuneteller auntie
- Yoon Hee-seok as Man smoking at Seoul Land

== Festivals ==
Cafe Noir was screened for a full year at various events of the festival circuit before it was given a domestic release in late December 2010. The DVD was finally released in June 2012.

- Venice International Film Festival (2009) - International Critic's Week
- Venice International Film Critics' Week (2009)
- Busan International Film Festival (2009) - Korean Cinema Today - Panorama
- Copenhagen International Film Festival (2010) - New Talent Grand Pix
- LA Film Fest (2010) - International Showcase
- T-Mobile New Horizons International Film Festival (2010) - Panorama
- Munich International Film Festival (2010) - Focus on the Far East
- Hong Kong International Film Festival (2010) - Indie Power
- International Film Festival Rotterdam (2010) - Bright Future

== Reception ==
Cafe Noir received positive reviews.
