= Yozoh =

South Korean singer and actress (born 1981)

- Born: June 11, 1981 (age 45); Seoul, South Korea
- Occupations: Singer; actress

Korean name
- Hangul: 신수진
- Hanja: 愼秀瑨
- RR: Sin Sujin
- MR: Sin Sujin

Stage name
- Hangul: 요조
- RR: Yojo
- MR: Yojo

Shin Su-jin (Korean: 신수진; born June 11, 1981), also known as Yozoh (요조), is a South Korean singer and actress. Yozoh released her first album My Name Is Yozoh in 2007. For contributing much to bringing Hongik University district's indie music to the mainstream, she is also known as the "singing goddess of Hongdae district". In 2010, she ventured into acting, appearing in Sogyumo Acacia Band's Story, Cafe Noir and Come, Closer.

== Discography ==
=== Studio albums ===
Title	Album details
Traveler	Released: October 21, 2008; Label: Pastel Music; Track listing: 1. "Giant"; 2. "아침 먹고 땡"; 3. "Egugugu"; 4. "Harmonica Sounds"; 5. "Morning Star"; 6. "아 외로워"; 7. "Happy Birthday"; 8. "바오밥나무"; 9. "Sunday"; 10. "Harmonica Sounds" (Belle Epoque version); 11. "그렇게 너에게"
Existence and Happiness	Released: July 23, 2013; Label: Magic Strawberry Sound; Track listing: 1. Existence and Happiness; 2. Smiling Flower; 3. Laundry; 4. Restless Peace; 5. Dancing Sorrow; 6. Mr. Smith; 7. A Cat Named Na-young; 8. We Are; 9. The Selfish; 10. My Name Is Yozoh (33 Years Old version)

=== Extended plays ===
Title	Album details
My Name Is Yozoh	Released: November 20, 2007; Label: Pastel Music; Track listing: 1. My Name Is Yozoh; 2. 슈팅스타; 3. Love; 4. 낮잠; 5. 바나나파티; 6. 사랑의 롤러코스터; 7. 숨바꼭질; 8. 그런지 카 9. 꽃 Yozoh; 10. My Name Is Yozoh (Radio)
We Lie Still Like a Line	Released: December 6, 2010; Label: Pastel Music; Track listing: 1. "We Lie Still Like a Line" (feat. Lee Sang-soon); 2. "Come, Closer"; 3. "연애는 어떻게 하는 거였더라"; 4. "Come, Closer" (Cinema version); 5. I Love You
Best Driver	Released: May 23, 2017; Label: Magic Strawberry Sound; Track listing: 1. "Passing by the Airport"; 2. "Getting Old"; 3. "A Biscuit Exists in Nowhere"; 4. "An Observer"; 5. "I Want to Make Fun"

== Filmography ==
Year	Title	Role	Notes
2010	Sogyumo Acacia Band's Story	Herself	Music documentary
2010	Come, Closer	Hye-young	
2010	Cafe Noir	Shim Eun-ha	
2016	Write or Dance	Su-jin	
