= Lee Hye-young =

- Hangul: 이혜영
- RR: I Hyeyeong
- MR: I Hyeyŏng

Lee Hye-young (Korean: 이혜영) may refer to:

- Lee Hye-young (actress, born 1962)
- Lee Hye-young (actress, born 1971)
