= Trois couleurs (magazine) =

French monthly culture magazine

Trois Couleurs
- Editor: Elisha Karmitz
- Categories: Culture, cinema
- Frequency: Monthly
- Total circulation: 200,000
- First issue: March 2002
- Company: MK2
- Country: France
- Based in: Paris
- Language: French, English
- Website: troiscouleurs.fr
- ISSN: 1633-2083

Trois Couleurs (Three Colors) is a Paris-based monthly magazine that focuses on culture, cinema and technology. It is edited by the French broadcasting group MK2, and its title pays tribute to the Three Colors trilogy by Krzysztof Kieślowski. It is distributed only in Paris: in MK2 movie theaters, the Fnac retail chain, and in 250 cultural places, restaurants, bars, concert halls, and museums. Trois Couleurs reaches 600,000 readers with a circulation of 200,000.

Most of the content is dedicated to cinema and to the promotion of independent films with interviews of directors, such as Jim Jarmusch and Frederick Wiseman.

The editorial policy claims to analyze complicated cultural phenomena in a simple way for a wide readership.

== History ==
At first, Trois Couleurs was dedicated to the current affairs of MK2 movie theaters. In 2007, editor Elisha Karmitz reshaped the magazine and widened the editorial policy to wider cultural matters. He also extended its distribution to cultural places, restaurants, bars, concert halls and museums.

The 50th issue of Trois Couleurs was the first published in the reshaped form, with only 56 pages. The magazine aimed to take an independent look at trends and news in the cultural sector, with topics like "Cult Scene", which covered groundbreaking film scenes. The writers provided subjective and personal analysis of film and cultural events. The magazine's relationship with its readers was considered important, and it published pieces of readers' art related to cinema.

Trois Couleurs became influential through broadcasting videos of concerts, interviews and documentaries. The editorial staff flew to Detroit to shoot a documentary on Motown Records and directed the video of a concert of Mos Def at Élysée Montmartre in 2007, which was broadcast on Dailymotion. They followed this with a Wu-Tang Clan concert in 2008.

In 2009, Trois Couleurs increased in size and widened its editorial policy: an urban lifestyle guide was added, featuring the best cultural spots in Paris. It also got a new logo inspired by urban culture. In December 2009, Trois Couleurs launched its first special issue, focusing on the counterculture of the 1960s, with Hedi Slimane as guest editor-in-chief.

Trois Couleurs was the first free French media to charge for collector issues. While the monthly magazine covered news and events, special issues put a cultural corpus into perspective through three perspectives: a thematic approach, a portfolio and discussions with artists. One special issue was inspired by When You're Strange, a documentary on The Doors. Others related to historical events, such as the Stanley Kubrick exhibition of the Cinémathèque française in 2011. Another special issue was released in 2012 when the movie On The Road (based on Jack Kerouac’s novel) was released.

In April 2011, the editorial staff shot a 75-minute documentary about hackism, directed by one of its editors for the French channel France 4. This included meetings with an ex-contributor to WikiLeaks and hacktivists of Anonymous before it became famous. The documentary was entitled Pirat@ges and got several good reviews. During the Cannes Film Festival in 2011, Trois Couleurs launched a reshaped form of the magazine, 132 pages in length. Étienne Rouillon, who was editor-in-chief on the special issue "Games Stories" and director of Pirat@ges, became editor-in-chief of the whole magazine in 2012.

== Policy ==
The aim of Trois Couleurs is to produce alternative content which suits as wide a readership as possible. It seeks to analyze complicated cultural phenomenon in a simple way and to open elitist production in the fields of culture, music and cinema to larger audiences.

To suit its readership, Trois Couleurs favours storytelling in the writing of its articles, like in the special issue called "Games Stories", released in 2011 to accompany the eponymous exhibition at the Grand Palais.

Topics are covered with three levels of analysis:

- Analysis of the new perspectives in art field opened by the release of a project
- Analysis of its feedback
- Analysis of it becoming a phenomenon

== Circulation ==
The target of Trois Couleurs consists in 60% of women, 50% of 15-34 years old people, 40% of middle-class people and 75% of Parisians. The magazine reaches 600,000 readers with a total circulation of 200,000, with MK2’s movie theaters being responsible for 70% of the total circulation.

== Layout ==
=== First pages ===
The first pages focus on the news of the month. These are set sections, including:

- Be kind, rewind: this section puts into perspective a lately released movie and one of the same inspiration or dedicated to the same theme
- Tendency: where a theme is at the top of the news because of the broadcasting of a movie, Trois Couleurs analyzes it and backs it with a video corpus
- Crosswords: the editorial staff asks someone well-known to comment some paragraphs and quotes from a literary work which is related to the project that person is releasing
- An eye for an eye: this short section analyzes the similarities between a film broadcast in movie theaters and an oldest one
- Curriculum vitæ: provides the CV of technical experts, concept designers and experts in programming
- Study Case: the pros and cons of a movie which is debatable
- Investigation File: analysis of a trendy topic
- Sex Tape': focusing on eroticism in a cultural production

=== Central pages ===
These pages focus on cinema and highlight neglected cinematographic phenomenon. The contents also gather interviews of actors and directors who are related to a recently broadcast movie. All of the monthly released movies are deciphered according to a personal and subjective look.

=== Store ===
Pages on movies, CDs, books, exhibitions, and video games.

=== Guide ===
The last part of the magazine covers the Parisian lifestyle, with a guide to the best concerts, bars and exhibitions of the month. It also introduces the events released by the MK2 movie theaters and includes a comic strip by Dupuy and Berberian.
