= Kim Seong-hun (filmmaker) =

South Korean film director

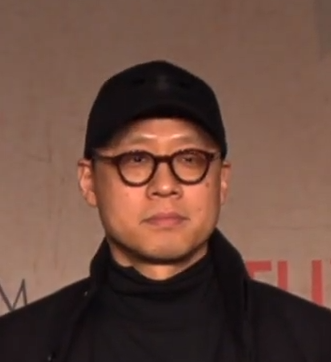
- Kim Seong-hun in 2019
- Born: February 20, 1971 (age 55); Gangneung, Gangwon Province, South Korea
- Education: Hankuk University of Foreign Studies
- Occupations: Film director, television director, screenwriter
- Years active: 2003–present

Korean name
- Hangul: 김성훈
- Hanja: 金成勳
- RR: Gim Seonghun
- MR: Kim Sŏnghun

Kim Seong-hun (born February 20, 1971) is a South Korean film and television director. He directed How the Lack of Love Affects Two Men (2006), A Hard Day (2014), and Kingdom (2019–20).

== Career ==
Kim Seong-hun began his filmmaking career as an assistant director on the romantic comedies Oh! Happy Day (2003; starring Jang Na-ra and Park Jung-chul) and He Was Cool (2004; starring Jeong Da-bin and Song Seung-heon).

In 2006, he directed his first feature film How the Lack of Love Affects Two Men, which follows a widower and his son who both fall for and fight over their new basement tenant (played by Baek Yoon-sik, Bong Tae-gyu and Lee Hye-young). It was a critical and commercial failure, and it would take eight years before he could get his sophomore film funded. Kim said, "It was so embarrassing to realize that was all I could do. [...] I had the firm resolve to give myself one more try before I die."

Inspired by Pedro Almodóvar's Volver, Kim began writing a new screenplay in 2008, finished its first draft in 2009, and continued to edit it until 2013 when filming finally went underway. He cast Lee Sun-kyun as the antihero and Cho Jin-woong as his antagonist in a black comedy/thriller about a corrupt homicide detective who hides the body of a hit-and-run victim in his mother's coffin only to find himself terrorized by a mysterious yet formidable blackmailer. A Hard Day (the Korean title translates to "Take It to the End") premiered in the Directors' Fortnight sidebar of the 2014 Cannes Film Festival where it drew unanimously positive reviews, with Variety praising Kim for "handling a taut yet elaborately plotted narrative with poise, control and near-faultless technical execution." Domestically, A Hard Day had a lackluster opening but strong word of mouth propelled it to becoming a box office hit, with more than 3.4 million tickets sold. The film received numerous awards and nominations, and Kim won Best Director at the 51st Grand Bell Awards, the 1st Korean Film Producers Association Awards, the 6th KOFRA Film Awards, the 20th Chunsa Film Art Awards and 51st Baeksang Arts Awards, as well as Best Screenplay at the 15th Busan Film Critics Awards and 35th Blue Dragon Film Awards.

== Filmography ==
=== Film ===
Film credit
Year	Title	Credited as			Ref.
Year	Title	Director	Writer	Producer	Ref.
2003	Oh! Happy Day	Assistant director	No	No	
2004	He Was Cool	Assistant director	No	No	
2006	How the Lack of Love Affects Two Men	Yes	No	No	
2014	A Hard Day	Yes	Yes	No	
2016	The Tunnel	Yes	Yes	No	
2023	Ransomed	Yes	No	No	

=== Web series ===
Year	Title	Credited as		Ref.
Year	Title	Director	Writer	Ref.
2019–2020	Kingdom	Yes	No	
2021	Kingdom: Ashin of the North	Yes	No	

== Awards and nominations ==
Award	Year	Category	Recipient	Result	Ref.
23rd Buil Film Awards	2014	Best New Director	A Hard Day	Nominated	
23rd Buil Film Awards	2014	Best Screenplay	A Hard Day	Nominated	
34th Korean Association of Film Critics Awards	2014	Critics' Top 10	A Hard Day	Won	
51st Grand Bell Awards	2014	Best Film	A Hard Day	Nominated	
51st Grand Bell Awards	2014	Best Director	A Hard Day	Won	
51st Grand Bell Awards	2014	Best Screenplay	A Hard Day	Nominated	
15th Busan Film Critics Awards	2014	Best Screenplay	A Hard Day	Won	
1st Korean Film Producers Association Awards	2014	Best Film	A Hard Day	Won	
1st Korean Film Producers Association Awards	2014	Best Director	A Hard Day	Won	
35th Blue Dragon Film Awards	2014	Best Film	A Hard Day	Nominated	
35th Blue Dragon Film Awards	2014	Best Director	A Hard Day	Nominated	
35th Blue Dragon Film Awards	2014	Best Screenplay	A Hard Day	Won	
6th KOFRA Film Awards	2015	Best Director	A Hard Day	Won	
20th Chunsa Film Art Awards	2015	Best Director (Grand Prix)	A Hard Day	Won	
20th Chunsa Film Art Awards	2015	Best Screenplay	A Hard Day	Nominated	
9th Asian Film Awards	2015	Best Screenwriter	A Hard Day	Nominated	
51st Baeksang Arts Awards	2015	Best Film	A Hard Day	Nominated	
51st Baeksang Arts Awards	2015	Best Director	A Hard Day	Won	
51st Baeksang Arts Awards	2015	Best Screenplay	A Hard Day	Nominated	
