= Jung Yu-mi (actress, born 1983) =

South Korean actress (born 1983)

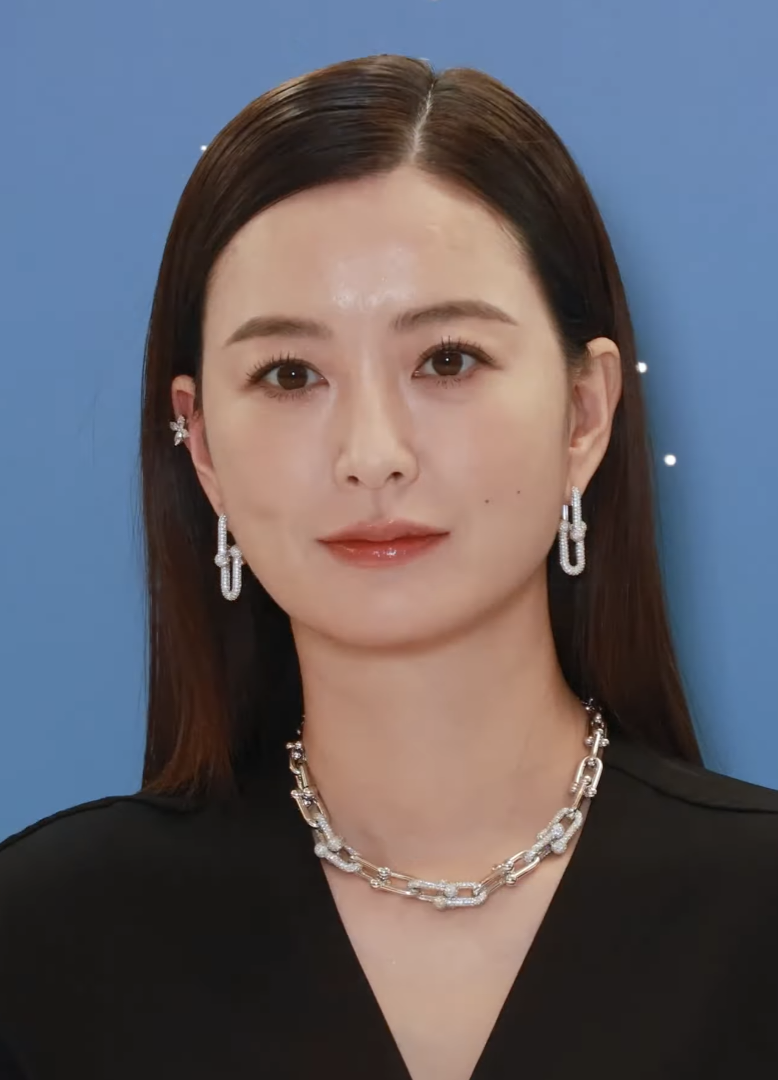
- Jung in December 2024
- Born: January 18, 1983 (age 43); Geumjeong District, Busan, South Korea
- Education: Seoul Institute of the Arts
- Occupation: Actress
- Years active: 2004–present
- Agent: Management SOOP

Korean name
- Hangul: 정유미
- RR: Jeong Yumi
- MR: Chŏng Yumi

Jung Yu-mi (Korean: 정유미, born January 18, 1983) is a South Korean actress. Known for her screen presence and versatility, she has received numerous accolades including a Baeksang Arts Award, two Blue Dragon Film Awards, and a Grand Bell Award. Jung made her feature film debut in Blossom Again (2005) and has since starred in the critically acclaimed films Family Ties (2006), Chaw (2009), My Dear Desperado (2010), and Sleep (2023), as well as box office hits Silenced (2011), Train to Busan (2016), and Kim Ji-young: Born 1982 (2019). She has also appeared in director Hong Sang-soo's films, notably Oki's Movie (2010) and Our Sunhi (2013). On television, she has starred in the series Live (2018) and Love Your Enemy (2024).

== Career ==
Jung Yu-mi made her acting debut in short films, notably How to Operate a Polaroid Camera. Shortly after, the then-aspiring actress impressed critics in the feature film Blossom Again, in which she gave an engrossing performance as an emotionally vulnerable teenager experiencing her first love, and thus received several newcomer awards that year. Her next film Family Ties was also critically acclaimed, for which she won Best Supporting Actress at the Blue Dragon Film Awards.

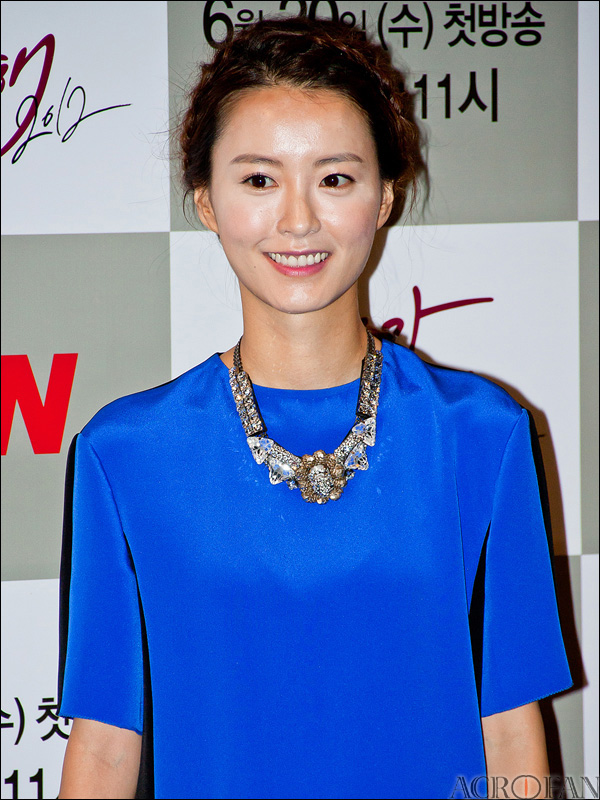
Jung in 2012

Jung's filmography is a diverse mix of arthouse indies such as The Room Nearby and Cafe Noir, cult monster flick Chaw, odd-couple romantic comedy My Dear Desperado, and melodrama Come, Closer. The Crucible (also known as Silenced), inspired by true events about a group of handicapped children who suffer physical and sexual abuse at the hands of their teachers, drew nearly 5 million viewers and became one of the highest-grossing films that Jung has starred in. Her ability to portray the lives of ordinary people in ways that are not ordinary has made her one of the most sought-after actresses for auteurial films, as evidenced by her continued collaboration with director Hong Sang-soo. She played the titular character in Hong's Oki's Movie (2010) and Our Sunhi (2013), where her fragile appeal is underpinned by a quiet strength and straightforwardness. Oki's Movie premiered at the 67th Venice Film Festival, while Our Sunhi premiered at the 66th Locarno International Film Festival. In 2015, she starred in the female-centric indie film The Table directed by Kim Jong-kwan, which premiered at the 21st Busan International Film Festival.

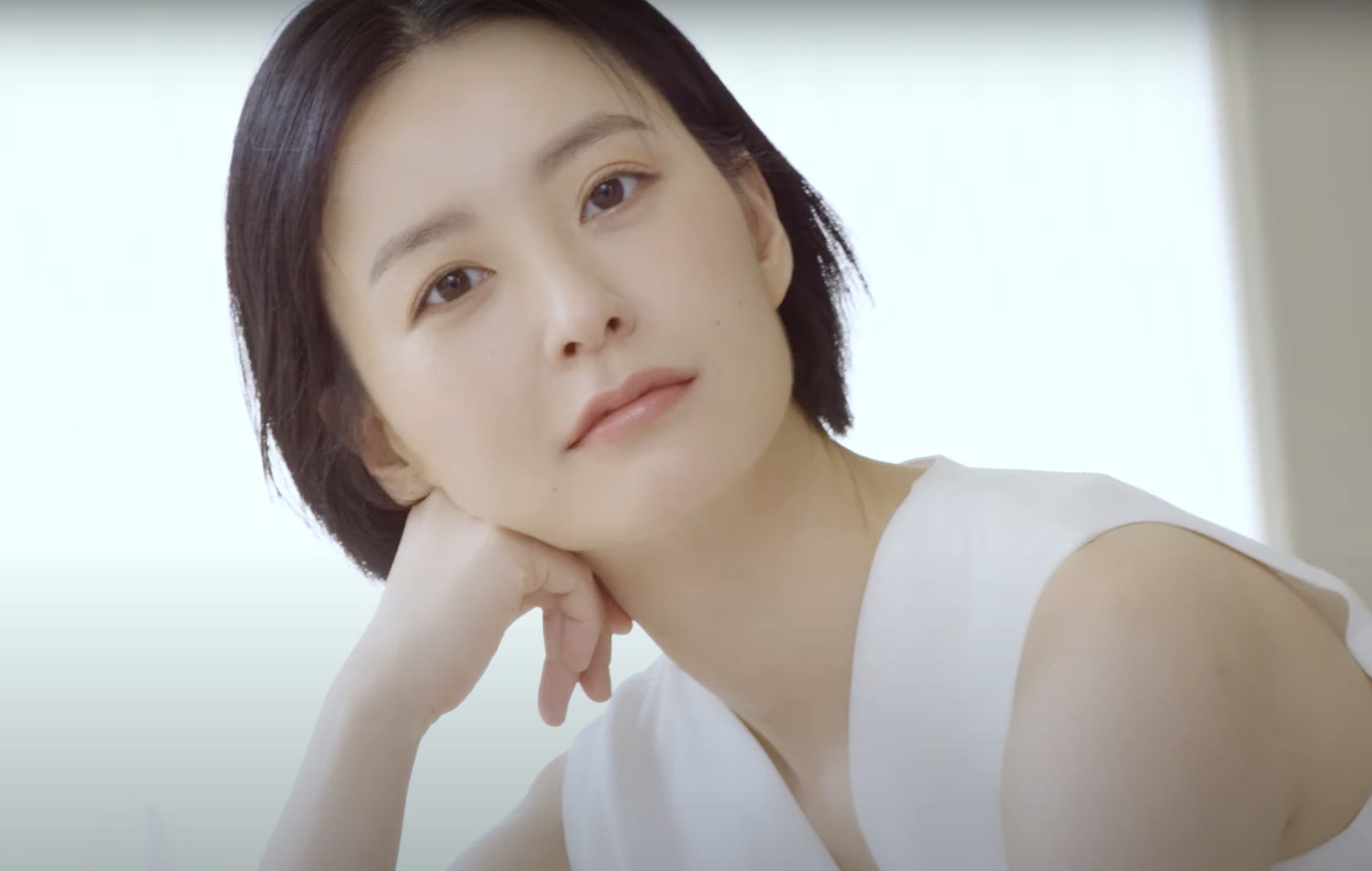
Jung in 2019 for Marie Claire Korea

Jung has also starred in several commercial films, such as Manhole (2014), where she plays a killer. She was cast in the zombie thriller Train to Busan (2016) directed by Yeon Sang-ho, which premiered at the Cannes Film Festival. The film was a major success, surpassing 10 million audiences. Jung reunited with Yeon in another film, Psychokinesis, a black comedy which premiered in 2018. Though much less prolific in television, Jung uses her quirky, offbeat image to great effect when playing peculiar but adorable characters in Que Sera Sera (2007), I Need Romance 2012, and Discovery of Love (2014). In 2018, Jung starred in the tvN drama Live, written by Noh Hee-kyung where she played a police officer.

Jung also showcased her sweet singing voice through the song "Andromeda" with Sung Si-kyung in 2016. They later did a live duet of the song in You Hee-yeol's Sketchbook in 2017. In 2019, Jung starred in the feminist film Kim Ji-young: Born 1982 based on the best-selling novel of the same title. The film was released in October 2019. In 2020, Jung played the titular role in Netflix's series The School Nurse Files.

== Filmography ==
=== Film ===
Year	Title	Role	Notes	Ref.
2003	Tell Her I Love Her	Nurse	Short film	
2004	How to Operate a Polaroid Camera	Sun-ah	Short film	
2005	A Bittersweet Life	Mi-ae	Bit part	
2005	Blossom Again	Cho In-young		
2006	09:05	Min-joo	Omnibus film	
2006	Family Ties	Chae-hyun		
2007	Shim's Family	Ha-eun		
2007	A Puppy, Our Family	Min-joo	Short film	
2009	Oishii Man	Jae-yeong	Special appearance	
2009	The Room Nearby	Koo Eon-joo		
2009	Like You Know It All	Yoo-shin		
2009	Relay	Lee Hee-jae	Omnibus film	
2009	Chaw	Byeon Soo-ryeon		
2009	A Million	Kim Ji-eun		
2009	Good Morning, President	Mi-mi	Special appearance	
2009	Lost in the Mountains	Mi-sook	Omnibus film	
2010	My Dear Desperado	Se-jin		
2010	Oki's Movie	Ok-hee		
2010	Come, Closer	Eun-hee	Omnibus film	
2010	Cafe Noir	Sun-hwa		
2011	Silenced	Seo Yoo-jin		
2012	In Another Country	Won-joo		
2012	The Winter Pianist	Mi-mi	Short film	
2013	Our Sunhi	Sunhi		
2013	Tough as Iron	Soo-ji		
2014	The Satellite Girl and Milk Cow	Il-ho (voice)	Korean dub	
2014	Manhole	Yeon-seo		
2015	The Himalayas	Choi Soo-young	Special appearance	
2016	Train to Busan	Seong-kyeong		
2017	Ladies of the Forest	Dal-lae	Short film	
2017	The Table	Yu-jin		
2018	Psychokinesis	Hong Sang-moo		
2019	Kim Ji-young: Born 1982	Kim Ji-young		
2023	Sleep	Soo-jin		
2024	Wonderland	Hae-ri		
2025	Love Untangled	Cafe Owner's wife	Cameo	

=== Television series ===
Year	Title	Role	Notes	Ref.
2007	Que Sera Sera	Han Eun-soo		
2010	KBS Drama Special: "The Great Gye Choon-bin"	Gye Choon-bin		
2012	I Need Romance 2012	Joo Yeol-mae		
2013	The Queen of Office	Jeong Joo-ri		
2013	Dating Agency: Cyrano	Bong Soo-ah	Cameo (Episode 8-9)	
2013	Reply 1994	Girl who bumps into Chilbong	Cameo (Episode 21)	
2014	Discovery of Love	Han Yeo-reum		
2016	Listen to Love	Han Jun-hee	Cameo (Episode 8)	
2017	The Lady in Dignity	Client	Cameo (Episode 6)	
2018	Live	Han Jung-o		
2018	What's Wrong with Secretary Kim	Lee Young-joon's friend	Cameo (Episode 14)	
2018	Tale of Fairy	Lotus	Voice cameo	
2024	Love Your Enemy	Yoon Ji-won		
TBA	When the Day Breaks	TBA		

=== Web series ===
Year	Title	Role	Notes	Ref.
2020	The School Nurse Files	Ahn Eun-yeong		

=== Television shows ===
Year	Title	Role	Notes	Ref.
2017–2018	Youn's Kitchen	Cast member		
2020	Summer Vacation	Cast member		
2021	Youn's Stay	Cast member and manager		
2023–2024	Jinny's Kitchen	Cast member and executive director		
2023	Jinny's Kitchen: Team Building	Cast member and executive director		

=== Music video appearances ===
Year	Title	Artist	Ref.
2015	"Zero Gravity"	Zion.T	
2017	"Holding On to You"	Sung Si-kyung	

== Discography ==
=== Singles ===
Title	Year	Album
"Andromeda" (feat. Sung Si-kyung)	2016	Dingo Project

== Accolades ==
=== Awards and nominations ===
Name of the award ceremony, year presented, category, nominee of the award, and the result of the nomination
Award ceremony	Year	Category	Nominee / Work	Result	Ref.
APAN Star Awards	2018	Top Excellence Award, Actress in a Miniseries	Live	Nominated	
Asian Film Awards	2020	Best Actress	Kim Ji-young: Born 1982	Nominated	
Asian Film Awards	2024	Best Actress	Sleep	Nominated	
Baeksang Arts Awards	2006	Best New Actress – Film	Blossom Again	Won	
Baeksang Arts Awards	2020	Best Actress – Film	Kim Ji-young: Born 1982	Nominated	
Baeksang Arts Awards	2024	Best Actress – Film	Sleep	Nominated	
Blue Dragon Film Awards	2005	Best New Actress	Blossom Again	Nominated	
Blue Dragon Film Awards	2006	Best Supporting Actress	Family Ties	Won	
Blue Dragon Film Awards	2011	Best Leading Actress	The Crucible	Nominated	
Blue Dragon Film Awards	2016	Best Supporting Actress	Train to Busan	Nominated	
Blue Dragon Film Awards	2021 (Note: Delayed until 2021 due to COVID-19 pandemic)	Popular Star Award	Kim Ji-young: Born 1982	Won	
Blue Dragon Film Awards	2021	Best Leading Actress	Kim Ji-young: Born 1982	Nominated	
Blue Dragon Film Awards	2023	Best Leading Actress	Sleep	Won	
Buil Film Awards	2011	Best Actress	Oki's Movie	Won	
Buil Film Awards	2014	Best Actress	Our Sunhi	Nominated	
Buil Film Awards	2016	Best Supporting Actress	Train to Busan	Nominated	
Buil Film Awards	2020	Best Actress	Kim Ji-young: Born 1982	Won	
Busan Film Critics Awards	2013	Best Actress	Our Sunhi	Won	
Chunsa Film Art Awards	2017	Best Supporting Actress	Train to Busan	Nominated	
Chunsa Film Art Awards	2020	Best Actress	Kim Ji-young: Born 1982	Nominated	
Cine21 Film Awards	2013	Best Actress	Our Sunhi	Won	
Director's Cut Awards	2022	Best Actress in film	Kim Ji-young: Born 1982	Nominated	
Director's Cut Awards	2022	Best Actress in series	The School Nurse Files	Nominated	
Golden Cinematography Awards	2011	Best Actress	My Dear Desperado	Won	
Grand Bell Awards	2018	Best Supporting Actress	Psychokinesis	Nominated	
Grand Bell Awards	2020	Best Actress	Kim Ji-young: Born 1982	Won	
Grand Bell Awards	2023	Best Actress	Sleep	Nominated	
KBS Drama Awards	2010	Excellence Award, Actress in a One-Act Drama Special	The Great Gye Choon-bin	Won	
KBS Drama Awards	2013	Excellence Award, Actress in a Miniseries	Queen of the Office	Nominated	
KBS Drama Awards	2014	Best Couple Award	Jung Yu-mi (with Eric Mun); Discovery of Love	Won	
KBS Drama Awards	2014	Excellence Award, Actress in a Miniseries	Discovery of Love	Won	
KBS Drama Awards	2014	Netizen Award, Actress	Discovery of Love	Won	
KBS Drama Awards	2014	Top Excellence Award, Actress	Discovery of Love	Nominated	
Korea Drama Awards	2018	Top Excellence Award, Actress	Live	Nominated	
Korea World Youth Film Festival	2017	Favorite Film Actress	The Table	Won	
Korean Association of Film Critics Awards	2005	Best New Actress	Blossom Again	Won	
Korean Association of Film Critics Awards	2020	Best Actress	Kim Ji-young: Born 1982	Won	
Korean Film Awards	2005	Best New Actress	Blossom Again	Nominated	
Korean Film Awards	2006	Best New Actress	Family Ties	Nominated	
Korean Film Awards	2010	Best Actress	My Dear Desperado	Nominated	
Korean Film Producers Association Awards	2023	Best Actress	Sleep	Won	
Seoul International Drama Awards	2021	Character of the Year	The School Nurse Files	Won	
Seoul International Drama Awards	2021	Outstanding Korean Actress	The School Nurse Files	Nominated	
Wildflower Film Awards	2014	Best Actress	Our Sunhi	Nominated	
Women in Film Korea Awards	2019	Best Actress	Kim Ji-young: Born 1982	Won	

=== Listicles ===
Name of publisher, year listed, name of listicle, and placement
Publisher	Year	Listicle	Placement	Ref.
Cine21	2023	Film Actress of the Year	1st	
Forbes	2018	Korea Power Celebrity 40	23rd	
The Screen	2019	2009–2019 Top Box Office Powerhouse Actors in Korean Movies	49th	
