= Waryong Park =

Park in Seoul, South Korea

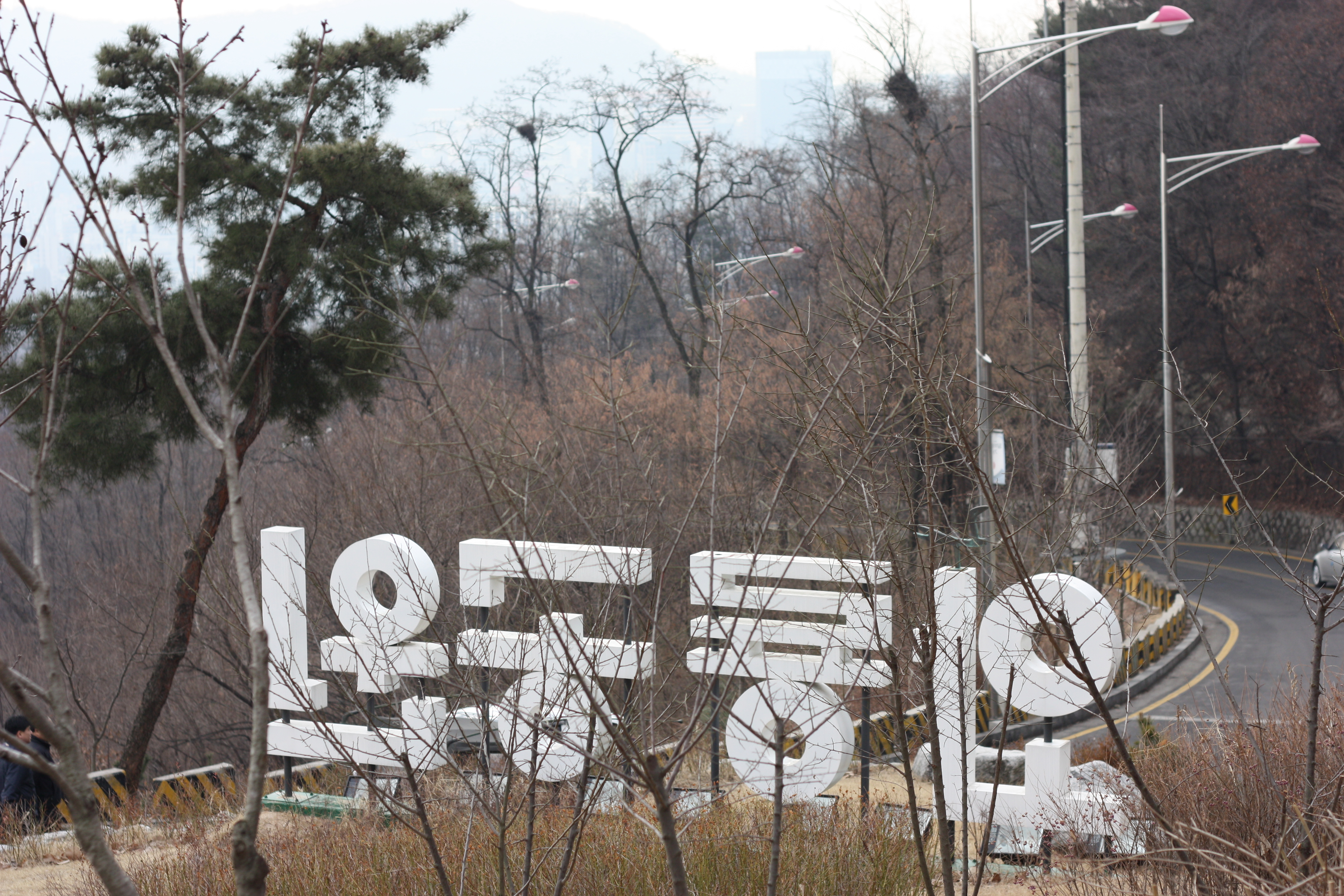
- Location: Jongno District, Seoul, South Korea
- Coordinates: 37.590589°N 126.990607°E
- Established: 1984

Waryong Park (Korean: 와룡공원; Hanja: 臥龍公園) is a park in Myeongnyun-dong, Jongno District, Seoul, South Korea. It was founded in 1984. It is adjacent to the mountain Bugaksan. The park is so named because it resembles a dragon (용/룡; yong/ryong) laying down.

The park was renovated in 2023, with safety railing and additional flora installed in the park.
