= Jung Doo-hong =

South Korean actor (born 1966)

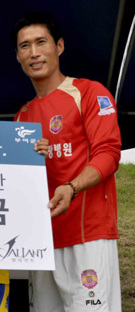
- Jung in 2010
- Born: December 14, 1966 (age 59); Chilsan-ri, Imcheon-myeon, Buyeo County, South Chungcheong Province, South Korea
- Education: Incheon Junior College - Physical Education
- Occupations: Action director; martial arts choreographer; stunt coordinator; actor
- Years active: 1989–present
- Spouse: Nadya Hutagalung (m. 1998; div. 1999)

Korean name
- Hangul: 정두홍
- Hanja: 鄭斗洪
- RR: Jeong Duhong
- MR: Chŏng Tuhong

Jung Doo-hong (Korean: 정두홍; born December 14, 1966) is a South Korean action director, martial arts choreographer, stunt coordinator, and actor.

== Early life ==
Jung Doo-hong was born in 1966 in Chilsan-ri, Imcheon-myeon, Buyeo County, South Chungcheong Province, the youngest of seven siblings. As a child, he was small for his age and had an unusually shy and introspective personality. His life changed dramatically when a private Taekwondo institute opened near his high school when he was a freshman student, and he became engrossed in the traditional Korean martial art, practicing taekwondo every day. Because he was so poor, he could not afford to pay his training fees; the master of the institute, Lee Gak-soo, taught him taekwondo for free because he recognized Jung's passion and talent.

In 1985, he entered Incheon Junior College as an athletics/physical education major. He was also selected as a member of a performing team that promoted taekwondo and Korean culture around the world, and spent much of his college years overseas, teaching taekwondo in the United States, Japan and Mexico. During his mandatory military service, he served as a martial arts trainer of a frontline elite unit, followed by a brief stint as a bodyguard for a parliamentarian after his discharge from the military.

== Career ==
=== Debut as stuntman ===
A friend on his bodyguard team recommended Jung as a stuntman. But in 1990, the compensation and benefits that Korean stuntmen received were meager at best, and Jung was hired only to carry heavy equipment for the stunt acting team on a direct-to-video film he applied for. Deeply disappointed, he temporarily quit stunt work; instead, every day he underwent intensive exercise at Boramae Park to improve his physical strength, and continued learning various martial arts such as aikido, hapkido, kickboxing and fencing under Kim Young-mo at a nearby training center from 11 p.m. until dawn. Three months later, he was hired as a stuntman for actor Lee Il-jae on Im Kwon-taek's hit movie General's Son (1990).

=== Action director ===
Jung quickly rose up the ranks to become the action director (also called stunt coordinator, martial arts director, or fight director) on the 1992 film Sirasoni ("Bobcat"), making him, at age 25, the youngest to hold that job in Korean film history. In the succeeding years, Jung became the country's most important and influential action director, remaining in the center of Korean movie action by directing/choreographing action for 4 to 6 movies per year. He was responsible for designing the street shooting in Shiri (1999), the wrestling in The Foul King (2000), the western spectacle in The Good, the Bad, the Weird (2008), and the hand-to-hand combat and wire work in The Berlin File (2013). Jung is the creator of "Koreanized" action, the rough-and-realistic Korean style of action and fight choreography.

=== Seoul Action School ===
Jung listed Park No-sik and Jang Dong-hwi among the Korean action film actors that he respects, saying, "I thought it was very cool to wear a formal hat and throw blows at the enemy and rescue women. But when I first [sic] debuted [as a stuntman], it was during the days when stuntmen were treated as less than human." Things have changed since then, but Jung believes working conditions for present-day stuntmen can still be improved further. This, and his commitment, passion and pride regarding the action/martial arts filmmaking in Korea are part of the reason he founded the Seoul Action School at a gymnasium in Boramae Park on July 1, 1998. He jointly established the facility with four of his younger colleagues with the aim of producing and nurturing martial arts directors and stuntmen. As of 2006, the school had 25 key members, and recruits new members every six months offering them free martial arts training. It later expanded and moved to Paju, Gyeonggi Province in 2009. Jung has spoken with candor about the difficulties of maintaining a stunt company in a country that he believes does not appreciate the action genre at all, but he is glad that young prospective actors at the Seoul Action School now seem to be proud to get into the action genre. Jung continues to be an advocate for safe working conditions and adequate compensation for stuntmen in Korea.

=== International projects ===
Besides Korean cinema, Jung was the action director for the 2002 Japanese film Seoul (ソウル) by Masahiko Nagasawa, and the 2007 Russian blockbuster Mongol: The Rise of Genghis Khan (лНМЦНК) by Sergei Bodrov. He was also the stunt double for actor Lee Byung-hun in Lee's Hollywood films G.I. Joe: Retaliation and Red 2 (both in 2013).

=== Acting ===
Longtime friend and collaborator, director Ryoo Seung-wan has spoken of how he greatly appreciates Jung's stubbornness when providing creative input in his films' action scenes. Jung, who has appeared onscreen in minor and supporting parts throughout his career, has had his most significant acting roles in Ryoo's movies, particularly as the villain in action-comedy-fantasy Arahan (2004).

In 2006, Ryoo cast Jung and himself in the leading roles in The City of Violence, about two friends who reunite in their hometown and go after the bad guys who killed their friend. Jung said he had wanted to be in a film that was "simply action" (without romance or suspense) and thought, "This was my last chance [to appear in an action movie]. So I wanted to show everything I had."

=== Boxing ===
In 2005 Jung (by then already in his forties) made his debut as a professional boxer in the welterweight division. He also opened a fitness center with TV host Lee Hoon, called "Double H Multi Gym."

== Personal life ==
Jung married Indonesian-Australian model and former MTV Asia VJ Nadya Hutagalung in 1998, but the union ended within a year; Hutagalung later said the marriage wasn't officially registered.

== Filmography ==
=== Action/Stunts ===
- Fist and Furious (난폭한 기록 / 난폭한 기록) (2019)
- Veteran (2015)
- Last Knights (2015)
- Finale
- Haemoo (2014)
- Kundo: Age of the Rampant (2014)
- Mad Sad Bad (2014)
- The X (short film, 2013)
- Hwayi: A Monster Boy (2013)
- Red 2 (2013)
- Fists of Legend (2013) (also credited as investor)
- G.I. Joe: Retaliation (2013) (uncredited)
- The Berlin File (2013)
- Hindsight (2011)
- The King of Legend (TV, 2010)
- The Unjust (2010)
- The Fugitive: Plan B (TV, 2010)
- Troubleshooter (2010)
- I Saw the Devil (2010)
- Moss (2010)
- Jeon Woo-chi: The Taoist Wizard (2009)
- Swallow the Sun (TV, 2009)
- Mother (2009)
- The Iron Empress (TV, 2009)
- The Divine Weapon (2008)
- Dachimawa Lee (2008)
- The Good, the Bad, the Weird (2008)
- Public Enemy Returns (2008)
- The Great King, Sejong (TV, 2008)
- Mongol: The Rise of Genghis Khan (2007) (also credited as second unit director)
- Hwang Jin Yi (2007)
- H.I.T (TV, 2007)
- Miracle on 1st Street (2007)
- The Restless (2006)
- Three Fellas (2006)
- Hanbando (2006)
- The City of Violence (2006) (also credited as executive producer)
- Hey Man (short film from If You Were Me 2, 2006)
- Blood Rain (2005)
- Crying Fist (2005)
- A Bittersweet Life (2005)
- Another Public Enemy (2005)
- Rikidōzan: A Hero Extraordinary (2004)
- Arahan (2004)
- Taegukgi (2004)
- Silmido (2003)
- Please Teach Me English (2003)
- Natural City (2003)
- Damo (TV, 2003)
- Tube (2003)
- YMCA Baseball Team (2002)
- Family (2002)
- Resurrection of the Little Match Girl (2002)
- Champion (2002)
- Over the Rainbow (2002)
- No Blood No Tears (2002)
- Seoul (2002)
- Public Enemy (2002)
- Out of Justice (2001)
- The Last Witness (2001)
- Musa: The Warrior (2001)
- The Legend Of Gingko (2000)
- Libera Me (2000)
- Il Mare (2000)
- Kilimanjaro (2000)
- The Foul King (2000)
- Chunhyang (2000)
- Phantom: The Submarine (1999)
- Shiri (1999)
- City of the Rising Sun (1999)
- Scent of a Man (1998)
- The Soul Guardians (1998)
- Seventeen (1998)
- Saturday, 2 p.m. (1998)
- Hallelujah (1997)
- Beat (1997)
- Fire Bird (1997)
- Kill the Love (1996)
- Born to Kill (1996)
- Come to Me (1996)
- Run Away (1995)
- Rehearsal (1995)
- The Terrorist (1995)
- The Rules of the Game (1994)
- General's Son III (1992)
- Sirasoni (1992)
- Kim's War (1992)
- General's Son II (1991)
- General's Son (1990)

=== Actor ===
- Ballerina (2025)
- The Emperor: Owner of the Mask (TV, 2017)
- Six Flying Dragons (TV, 2015)
- Sense8 (TV, 2015) (cameo, ep 3)
- The Greatest Love (TV, 2011) (cameo, ep 1)
- The Fugitive: Plan B (TV, 2010) (cameo)
- Action Boys (documentary, 2008) (uncredited, as himself)
- Dachimawa Lee (2008) (cameo)
- The Man called 'Tiger' (short film, 2007)
- Femme Fatale (2007) (cameo)
- H.I.T (TV, 2007) (cameo)
- Miracle on 1st Street (2007)
- The City of Violence (2006)
- Hey Man (short film in If You Were Me 2, 2006)
- Fighter in the Wind (2004)
- Arahan (2004)
- Taegukgi (2004)
- Please Teach Me English (2003)
- Kick Your Bottom! (short film, 2003)
- Natural City (2003)
- Resurrection of the Little Match Girl (2002)
- Ruler of Your Own World (TV, 2002)
- Champion (2002)
- No Blood No Tears (2002)
- The Foul King (2000)
- Timeless Obsession (1996)
- Born to Kill (1996)
- Run Away (1995)
- A Bloody Battle for Revenge (1992)
- The Continent of Ambition (1992)
- I Have Nothing (1992)
- General's Son II (1991)
- Ggok-ji-dan (1990)

=== Variety show ===
- Run Jin (TV, 2025) Episode 33 (Jin Wick)
- Law of the Jungle in Solomon Islands (TV, 2014)

== Nominations ==
- Blue Dragon Awards:
  - 2013 Best Technical Award (The Berlin File)
  - 2014 Best Technical Award (Kundo: Age of the Rampant)
  - 2015 Best Technical Award (Veteran)

== Awards ==
- 2013 14th Busan Film Critics Awards: Technical Award (The Berlin File)
- 2013 2nd APAN Star Awards: Achievement Award (The Berlin File)
- 2008 7th Korean Film Awards: Best Visual Effects (The Good, the Bad, the Weird)
- 2005 28th Golden Cinematography Awards: Special Jury Prize (Arahan)
- 2004 12th Chunsa Film Art Awards: Best Supporting Actor (Fighter in the Wind)
