= General's Son =

- Theatrical release poster
- Hangul: 장군의 아들
- Hanja: 將軍의 아들
- RR: Janggunui adeul
- MR: Changgunŭi adŭl
- Directed by: Im Kwon-taek
- Written by: Yoon Sam-yook
- Based on: The General's Son by Hong Song-yu
- Produced by: Lee Tae-won
- Starring: Park Sang-min; Shin Hyun-joon
- Cinematography: Jung Il-sung
- Edited by: Park Sun-duk
- Music by: Shin Pyong-ha
- Distributed by: Taehung Pictures
- Release date: June 9, 1990
- Running time: 108 minutes
- Country: South Korea
- Languages: Korean; Japanese

General's Son (Korean: 장군의 아들; RR: Janggunui adeul) is a 1990 South Korean crime film directed by Im Kwon-taek. It stars Park Sang-min as Kim Du-han, a gangster who discovers that he is the son of General Kim Jwa-jin. The film is the first in a trilogy, followed by General's Son II (1991) and General's Son III (1992).

General's Son was the most highly attended film in South Korea in both 1990 and 1991.

== Plot ==
Kim Du-han lost his mother at the age of eight, and he survives on the streets as a singing beggar. His natural-born fighting skills places him on the mean streets of Jongno with the kisaeng house Umigwan at the center. He is soon recognized for his incredible strength and ability. He finds out through Shin Ma-jeok, the head of a student gang, that he is the son of General Kim Jwa-jin who fought against the Japanese army. Meanwhile, the Yakuzas expand their sphere of influence and try to take over the Jongno streets but Du-han protects the Korean vendors of Jongno and wins their respect. When the head of Wumigwan, Kim Gi-hwan is arrested, Du-han becomes the leader of the Jongno gang.

== Cast ==
- Park Sang-min as Kim Du-han
- Shin Hyun-joon as Hayashi
- Lee Il-jae
- Bang Eun-hee
- Kim Hyung-Il
- Hwang Jung-min
- Jung Doo-hong
- Kim Sun-kyung
- Yang Taek-jo

== Awards ==
- Grand Bell Awards: Best New Actor (1991)
