= Kim Du-han =

South Korean gangster and politician (1918–1972)

- 김두한
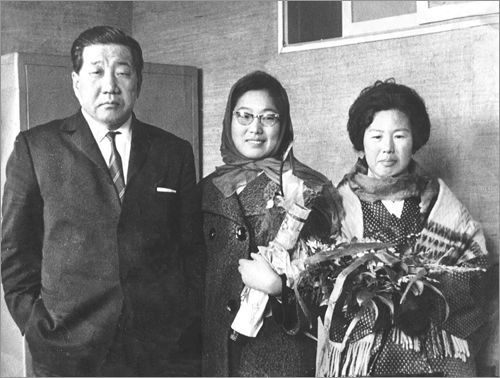
- Kim (leftmost) in 1963

Member of the National Assembly of South Korea
- In office November 10, 1965 – September 24, 1966
- In office May 31, 1954 – May 30, 1958

Personal details
- Born: May 15, 1918 Keijō, Korea, Empire of Japan
- Died: November 21, 1972 (aged 54) Seoul, South Korea
- Party: Independent politician
- Other political affiliations: Liberal (1954); Progressive (1956); Democratic Socialists (1956–1960); Korea Independence (1965–1966); New Democratic (1967–1969, 1969–1972)
- Children: Kim Eul-dong
- Parent(s): Kim Chwajin (father, disputed)
- Relatives: Song Il-gook (grandson)

Korean name
- Hangul: 김두한
- Hanja: 金斗漢
- RR: Gim Duhan
- MR: Kim Tuhan

Art name
- Hangul: 의송
- Hanja: 義松
- RR: Uisong
- MR: Ŭisong

Kim Du-han (Korean: 김두한; May 15, 1918 – November 21, 1972), also spelled Kim Doo-han, was a South Korean mobster, anti-communist activist, soldier and politician. His art name was Uisong (의송).

== Biography ==
=== Early life ===
Kim Du-han claimed to be the son of Kim Chwajin, although this is disputed. He graduated from Gyo-dong Elementary School in Seoul but spent much of his youth living as an orphan and vagrant.

=== Criminal Activities ===
During the late period of the Imperial Japanese rule in Korea, he became the leader of the Youth Action Corps, a street gang in the Jongno area and gained influence.

Despite his tumultuous youth, he took pride in being the son of General Kim Jwa-jin and engaged in activities such as blowing up Japanese armories and protecting Korean merchants, earning a reputation as a "chivalrous outlaw." He was considered to be the greatest fist fighter in Korea during his time.

=== Political career ===
After Korea's liberation, Kim joined Syngman Rhee's Liberal Party, where he served as a politician. He served as inspector general of the Korean Youth Corps, led by figures such as Syngman Rhee, Kim Ku, and Shin Ik-hee. He was actively involved in anti-communist activities, becoming a leading figure in the anti-communist movement. However, he engaged in violent methods, including acts of killing during this struggle. In 1948, Kim Du-han was sentenced to death by an American military tribunal for the murder of Jeong Jin-ryong, a leading member of the Communist Party of Korea. He was imprisoned in Okinawa but escaped execution when his case was later transferred to the newly formed South Korean government, which quickly had him released.

After the founding of the South Korean government, Kim continued his anti-communist and youth activism, serving as a senior member of the Federation of Korean Trade Unions and the Chief of Staff of the Korean Student Volunteer Corps. In 1954, he was elected as an independent candidate to the 3rd National Assembly, representing the Jongno constituency in Seoul. In 1965, he was elected again in a by-election for the 6th National Assembly, representing Yongsan District. Shortly after joining the 6th National Assembly, Kim was imprisoned at Seodaemun Prison in connection with the "Han-guk Independence Party Conspiracy Case." However, a resolution for his release was supported by 106 votes from both opposition and ruling party members of the National Assembly, leading to his release.

Kim's political career took a dramatic turn during the "Saccharin Smuggling Scandal" in the National Assembly. In a shocking and unprecedented act, he threw excrement at cabinet ministers, leading to what became known as the "National Assembly Excrement-Throwing Incident." This act resulted in his imprisonment once again at Seodaemun Prison, marking an infamous chapter in South Korea's parliamentary history. He eventually resigned from his position in 1966, bringing an end to his unique political career.

=== Personal life ===
After retiring from politics, Kim Du-han died in November 1972 due to hypertension. He is buried in Sinsegae Memorial Park in Jangheung-myeon, Yangju, Gyeonggi Province.

Kim Du-han was the father of South Korean politician, Kim Eul-dong, and the grandfather to her son, South Korean actor Song Il-gook.

== In popular culture ==
- Portrayed by Park Sang-min in the General's Son trilogy.
  - General's Son (1990)
  - General's Son II (1991)
  - General's Son III (1992)
- Kim was portrayed by Ahn Jae-mo and Kim Yeong-cheol in the 2002 SBS television series Rustic Period.
  - Ahn appears in a cameo appearance in the 2023 tvN television series Tale of the Nine Tailed 1938 as an actor playing the role of Kim as a Meta-reference.
- Portrayed by his grandson Song Il-gook in the MBC television series This Man.
- Portrayed by Kang In-deok in the 1981―82 TV series, 1st Republic.

His most famous role was as the inspiration for Lookism's Gapryong Kim
