= Kim Eul-dong =

South Korean politician (born 1945)

- 김을동
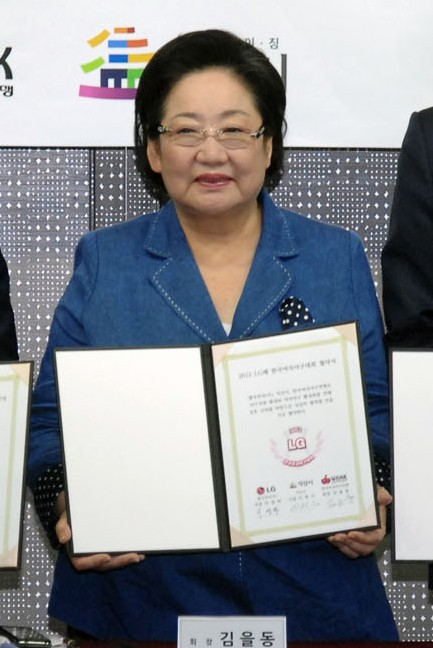
- Kim in 2022

Member of the National Assembly of South Korea

Personal details
- Born: 10 October 1945 (age 81) Jongno, Seoul, South Korea
- Party: People Power
- Children: Song Il-gook
- Parent: Kim Du-han (father)
- Relatives: Kim Chwajin (grandfather)

Korean name
- Hangul: 김을동
- Hanja: 金乙東
- RR: Gim Euldong
- MR: Kim Ŭltong

Kim Eul-dong (Korean: 김을동; born 5 September 1945) is a South Korean politician and former actress. She entered politics after retiring from acting. She was the 18th (Proportional representation), 19th (Seoul Songpa C) member of the National Assembly, and the female chairperson of the Saenuri Party. She is the granddaughter of Kim Chwajin, the daughter of Kim Du-han, and the mother of actor Song Il-gook. In 2016, 20th General Election, she failed to get elected as member of the nation assembly.

== Filmography ==
=== Film ===
Year	Title	Role
1981	With Passion and Heat	
1987	Dyo Hwa	
1988	That Last Winter	
1988	Puppy Love	Hwa-young's mother
1989	Sand Castle	
1989	Bet, Regardless Of Losing	
1990	Man Market	
1990	Young Shim	Young-shim's mother
1991	This Is the Beginning of Love	Principal
2003	Natural City	
2005	Mapado	Woman from Yeosu
2006	The Legend of Seven Cutter	
2007	Mapado 2: Back to the Island	Woman from Yeosu

=== Television ===
Year	Title	Role
1982	Cheonsaengyeonbun	
1987	Terms of Endearment	
1989	And So Flows History	Mrs. Song's servant
1990	Our Paradise	Kim Jin-oh
1990	Fun World	Aunt
1994	The Lonely Man	
1995	Jang Nok-soo	Saeng-won's wife
1995	West Palace	Court Lady Eom
1996	Power of Love	Lee Sun-young
1997	Myth of a Hero	
1998	Legend of Ambition	
1999	Wave	
2002	Royal Story: Jang Hui-bin	Court Lady Kwon
2006	Sharp 3	Han Jeong-hee
2007	Kimchi Cheese Smile	Kim Eul-dong
2007	Daughters-in-Law	Oh Hyang-sim

== Election results ==
=== General elections ===
Year	Elections	Constituency	Political party	Votes (%)	Results
1996	15th National Assembly General Election	Jongno (Seoul)	ULD	6,602 (6.72%)	Defeated (4th)
2000	16th National Assembly General Election	Seongnam Sujeong (Gyeonggi)	ULD	19,018 (20.95%)	Defeated (3rd)
2004	17th National Assembly General Election	Seongnam Sujeong (Gyeonggi)	GNP	32,665 (30.23%)	Defeated (2nd)
2008	18th National Assembly General Election	Proportional representation (5th)	Pro-Park Alliance	2,258,750 (13.18%)	Elected
2012	19th National Assembly General Election	Songpa C (Seoul)	Saenuri	59,664 (51.38%)	Won
2016	20th National Assembly General Election	Songpa C (Seoul)	Saenuri	50,212 (39.66%)	Defeated (2nd)

=== Local elections ===
==== Seoul Metropolitan Council ====
Year	Elections	Constituency	Political party	Votes (%)	Remarks
1991	1991 Iocal Election	Seoul Dongdaemun 2nd	Democratic (1990)	9,016 (32.18%)	Defeated (2nd)
1995	1st Iocal Election	Seoul Dongdaemun 3rd	Democratic (1991)	24,102 (65.33%)	Won
