= Yoon Chan =

Yoon Chan may refer to:

- Yoon Chan (actor, born 1972)
- Yoon Chan (actor, born 1996)
