= Beak Woon-hak =

South Korean filmmaker (born 1962)

- Born: 1962 (age 63–64); South Korea
- Other name: Baek Woon-hak
- Education: Chung-Ang University
- Occupations: Film director, screenwriter

Korean name
- Hangul: 백운학
- RR: Baek Unhak
- MR: Paek Unhak

Beak Woon-hak (Korean: 백운학; born 1962) is a South Korean film director and screenwriter. Beak wrote and directed the thrillers Tube (2003) and The Chronicles of Evil (2015).

== Career ==
Beak was a TV producer and an ad producer, being involved in 50 commercials from 1993 to 1996. In 1996, he was an assistant director on Channel 69 (1996) and three years later, he was involved in the scriptwriting and production of Kang Je-gyu's blockbuster Shiri (1999). His short Waist Bottle won the Grand Prize at the Shin-young Youth Film Festival in 2003.

He made his directorial feature debut with the subway-set thriller Tube (2003).

His second feature The Chronicles of Evil (2015) starring Son Hyun-joo, also a thriller, was a hit with more than 2.1 million admissions.

== Filmography ==
- Channel 69 (1996) - assistant director
- Shiri (1999) - assistant director, script editor
- Waist Bottle (short film, 2003)
- Tube (2003) - director, screenwriter
- The Chronicles of Evil (2015) - director, screenwriter
