= Ordinary Person =

2017 South Korean crime drama film

- Hangul: 보통사람
- RR: Botongsaram
- MR: Pot'ongsaram
- Directed by: Kim Bong-han
- Written by: Samuel Cho
- Starring: Son Hyun-joo; Jang Hyuk
- Production company: Trinity Entertainment
- Distributed by: Opus Pictures
- Release date: March 23, 2017
- Running time: 121 minutes
- Country: South Korea
- Language: Korean
- Box office: US$2.6 million

Ordinary Person (Korean: 보통사람) is a 2017 South Korean crime drama film directed by Kim Bong-han, starring Son Hyun-joo and Jang Hyuk. It was released on 23 March 2017.

== Synopsis ==
In the spring of 1987, Kang Sung-jin (Son Hyun-joo) was an upright police officer with a wife (Ra Mi-ran) and a son. Their only wish was to lead a simple life and they worked hard towards their dream of owning a two-storey house. One day Sung-jin got involved in a conspiracy led by National Security Planning chief, Choi Gyu-nam (Jang Hyuk) after he arrested a suspected murderer (Jo Dal-hwan) by chance. Gyu-nam, being a cold-blooded and manipulative man, made use of Sung-jin's weakness to strike a deal with him. Despite newspaper reporter Chu Jae-jin (Kim Sang-ho)'s advice to quit from the operation, Sung-jin discovered that he did not have a choice as he had already scheduled an operation to treat his son's legs.

== Cast ==
- Son Hyun-joo as Kang Sung-jin, police officer
- Jang Hyuk as Choi Gyu-nam, National Security Planning chief
- Kim Sang-ho as Chu Jae-jin, reporter
- Ra Mi-ran as Song Jeong-sook, Sung-jin's wife (special appearance)
- Ji Seung-hyun as Park Dong-gyu
- Jung Man-sik as Shin Yong-soo (special appearance)
- Jo Dal-hwan as Kim Tae-sang
- Oh Yeon-ah as Park Sun-hee
- Park Hyung-soo as Agent
- Choi Yoon-so as Ji-sook
- Park Ji-il
- Han Ha-na
- Lee Ja-eun
- Joo Kwang-hyun

== Awards and nominations ==
Year	Award	Category	Recipient	Result
2017	39th Moscow International Film Festival	Best Actor	Son Hyun-joo	Won
2017	39th Moscow International Film Festival	NETPAC Award - Jury Prize	Ordinary Person	Won
2017	2017 Korean Film Shining Star Awards	Star Award	Son Hyun-joo	Won
