= Lady Daddy =

- South Korean poster
- Hangul: 아빠가 여자를 좋아해
- Hanja: 아빠가 女子를 좋아해
- RR: Appaga yeojareul joahae
- MR: Appaga yŏjarŭl choahae
- Directed by: Lee Kwang-jae
- Written by: Chun Sung-il
- Produced by: Chun Sung-il; Im Yeong-ho
- Starring: Lee Na-young; Kim Ji-seok
- Cinematography: Oh Seung-hwan
- Edited by: Moon In-dae
- Music by: Choi Seung-hyun
- Release date: January 14, 2010
- Running time: 113 minutes
- Country: South Korea
- Language: Korean
- Box office: US$1,072,598

Lady Daddy (Korean: 아빠가 여자를 좋아해; RR: Appaga yeojareul joahae) is 2010 South Korean film about a transgender photographer who is discovered by her son.

== Plot ==
Ji-hyeon (Lee Na-young) is a transgender woman working as a photographer. Then a young boy, Yoo-bin, shows up claiming Ji-hyeon is his divorced birth father. Ji-hyeon tries to juggle the role of father to Yoo-bin and girlfriend to her boyfriend played by Kim Ji-seok.

== Cast ==
- Lee Na-young as Ji-hyeon
- Kim Ji-seok as Jun-seok
- Jeong Ae-yeon as Bo-yeong (ex-wife of Ji-hyeon)
- Kim Hee-su as Yu-bin (Ji-hyeon & Bo-yeong's son)
- Lee Pil-mo as Min-kyu
- Kim Hee-won as Detective Kim
- Kim Pung as Baek-su
- Jo Seung-eun as Sexy woman
- Kim Eung-soo as Ji-hyeon's father
- Domashchenko Vadym as Joseph
- Kim Jung-suk
- Jeong Gi-seop as Detective 1
- Tae In-ho as Men's suit salesman
