= No Mercy for the Rude =

- Theatrical poster
- Hangul: 예의없는 것들
- Hanja: 禮儀없는 것들
- RR: Yeuieomneun geotdeul
- MR: Yeŭiŏmnŭn kŏttŭl
- Directed by: Park Chul-hee
- Written by: Park Chul-hee
- Produced by: Hwang Woo-hyun; Hwang Jae-woo
- Starring: Shin Ha-kyun; Kim Min-jun; Yoon Ji-hye
- Cinematography: Oh Seung-hwan
- Edited by: Steve M. Choe
- Music by: Jeon Sang-yoon
- Production companies: Tube Pictures; Studio 2.0
- Distributed by: Lotte Entertainment
- Release date: August 24, 2006
- Running time: 113 minutes
- Country: South Korea
- Language: Korean
- Budget: US$3.5 million
- Box office: US$4,884,108

No Mercy for the Rude (Korean: 예의없는 것들; RR: Yeuieomneun geotdeul) is a 2006 South Korean neo-noir action comedy film directed by Park Chul-hee. It stars Shin Ha-kyun in the lead role. The film revolves around a mute hitman who vows to kill only rude people, and use the money for his tongue operation.

The film released theatrically in South Korea on 24 August 2006.

== Plot ==
A lonely chef with a speech impediment takes a job as a professional killer in order to raise the money he needs for an operation on his tongue. Known as "Killar" (Shin Ha-kyun), he and his partner "Ballet" (Kim Min-jun), make a rule to only kill rude and impolite people. After killing each one of his victims, "Killar" goes to the same bar where he meets "Her" (Yoon Ji-hye), a woman who becomes attracted to him. His life begins to unravel after he and "Ballet" kill the wrong person by mistake.

== Cast ==
- Shin Ha-kyun as "Killar"
- Yeo Jin-goo as "young killar"
- Yoon Ji-hye as "Her"
- Kim Min-jun as "Ballet"
- Kang San as "Young Boy"
- Park Gil-soo as "Feces Weight"
- Park Choong-seon as "Detective Seo"
- Park Seon-woo as "Knife Scar"
- Kim Byeong-ok as "Hairtail"
- Lee Han-wi as "Chief Killa"
- Kim Eung-soo as "Director"
- Ko Chang-seok as "Piano"

== Release ==
No Mercy for the Rude was released in South Korea on 24 August 2006, and on its opening weekend was ranked second at the box office with 269,308 admissions. The film went on to receive a total of 904,802 admissions nationwide, with a gross (as of 17 September 2006) of US$4,884,108.
