= Howling (2012 film) =

- Film poster
- Hangul: 하울링
- RR: Haulling
- MR: Haulling
- Directed by: Yoo Ha
- Written by: Yoo Ha
- Based on: The Hunter by Asa Nonami
- Produced by: Lee Tae-hun
- Starring: Song Kang-ho; Lee Na-young
- Cinematography: Gong Pyeong-jae
- Edited by: Park Gok-ji
- Music by: Kim Joon-seok
- Production companies: Opus Pictures; Film Poeta
- Distributed by: CJ Entertainment; United Pictures
- Release date: February 9, 2012
- Running time: 114 minutes
- Country: South Korea
- Language: Korean
- Budget: ₩7.0 billion
- Box office: ₩11,765,039,500 $10,354,039

Howling (Korean: 하울링) is a 2012 South Korean action thriller film written and directed by Yoo Ha based on the 1996 novel The Hunter (凍える牙 lit. "Freezing Fang") by Japanese writer Asa Nonami. The plot follows two detectives, a veteran male cop (Song Kang-ho) and female rookie (Lee Na-young), who are appointed to investigate serial murders.

== Plot ==
Mapo District, Seoul. Middle-aged police detective Jo Sang-gil (Song Kang-ho), a single father with a young son and daughter, is assigned the seemingly straightforward case of a man, Oh Gyeong-il, who set fire to himself inside a car. Chafing at his lack of promotion after so long on the police force, but under pressure from his boss-cum-friend (Shin Jung-geun), he also grudgingly agrees to work with rookie detective Cha Eun-young (Lee Na-young), a 30-year-old divorcee who has just been transferred from motorcycle patrol duty. The dead man, who had drugs in his system, has a large dog-bite on his thigh but no fingerprints. The police discover the immolation was not suicide but was triggered by a timer in the victim's trouser belt. Sang-gil traces the sex club the victim had visited but bawls out Eun-young when she makes an amateurish error during a fight. Against protocol, Sang-gil omits to file reports on the progress of the case, as he wants to earn all the kudos himself and thereby a promotion. His boss finds out, just as a second victim, Nam Sang-hun, is found bitten to death by a large dog or wolf. After talking to dog-trainers, the police learn the man they need to see is Min Tae-shik, a retired police dog trainer who lives with his drug addict daughter; during a raid on his house, Min escapes and a wolf-dog subsequently kills a woman in the backstreets. Eun-young starts questioning police-dog trainers, as well as investigating those missing or dead, and comes up with the name of Kang Myung-ho, who supposedly committed suicide a while ago. She sets off to investigate on her own.

After 4 people fell victim to the dog, Eun-young investigate Tae-shik's home. From the house she discover he has been training his dog, Jil-Po, to kill 6 targets, including a police named Bae. She found Jung-ah in a hospital and gather more information where found that Jung-ah was used as prostitute by the 5 victims. We then switch to a corrupt cop and Min, a businessman who paid him to kill Oh Gyeong-il before. Their deal went awry and the businessman kill him, make it look like a suicide and left a fake last will. Police Department freeze the case after their death but Eun-young still bothered by the unknown 6th man.

Police Department later declare that they will start a hunt to kill the dog. Eun-young and Sang-gil use this information to then convince Young-jin to tell them who is the final target, which is revealed to be a minister. Noticing that all 5 of his henchmen are dead, the minister remember that Jung-ah used to tell him about his dad who was a dog trainer. He then plot his escape using boat. Eun-young later demoted to patrol police by their chief.

The police department then set up an ambush using Jung-ah's cloth in their old house. The ambush fail and Eun-young follow Jil-Pong to an old house where the minister prepare to escape. During the ensuing fight Sang-gil shoot and kill Jil-Pong while he bites the minister, which he later explain that he missed. The movie end with Sang-gil rewarded for the case and Eun-young help to rehabilitate Jung-ah.

== Cast ==
- Song Kang-ho ... Detective Jo Sang-gil
- Lee Na-young ... Detective Cha Eun-young
- Shin Jung-geun as Chief Detective Seo
- Lee Sung-min as Detective Young-cheol
- Im Hyeon-seong as Detective
- Jeong Jin as Detective
- Jo Young-jin as Jung-ah's father
- Nam Bo-ra as Jung-ah
- Kwon Tae-won as Choi, the racketeer
- Lee Tae-ri as Sang-gil's son - (credit as Lee Min-ho)
- Jung In-gi as Coroner
- Jang In-ho
- Kim Gyeong-ryong
- Kim Dong-yoon as Gangster 1
- Kim Young-hoon as Cha Eun-young's ex-husband
