= Ireland (TV series) =

2004 South Korean television series

- Promotional poster
- Genre: Romance; Drama
- Written by: In Jung-ok
- Directed by: Kim Jin-man
- Starring: Lee Na-young; Kim Min-jun; Kim Min-jung; Hyun Bin
- Country of origin: South Korea
- Original language: Korean
- No. of seasons: 1
- No. of episodes: 16

Production
- Producer: Kim Sa-hyun
- Running time: 70 minutes

Original release
- Network: Munhwa Broadcasting Corporation
- Release: September 1 – October 21, 2004

Ireland (Korean: 아일랜드; RR: Aillaendeu) is a 2004 South Korean television series starring Lee Na-young, Kim Min-jun, Kim Min-jung and Hyun Bin. It aired on MBC from September 1 to October 21, 2004, on Wednesdays and Thursdays at 21:55 (KST) for 16 episodes.

== Synopsis ==
Adopted into an Irish family as a child and raised in Northern Ireland, Lee Joong-ah (Lee Na-young) is devastated when her entire family is killed after her brother gets involved with the Irish Republican Army. Deeply traumatized, racked by guilt and suddenly rootless, she decides to journey to her homeland to search for her biological family. She quickly meets Kang Gook (Hyun Bin), a kind, solitary bodyguard who offers to help her in her quest. Fate has her cross paths with her biological brother, Jae-bok (Kim Min-jun), when she saves him from an accident, but they part not knowing they are related. Jae-bok is a slacker living with his girlfriend Si-yeon (Kim Min-jung), a kind-hearted adult film actress who is her family's breadwinner. All four go about their lives, unaware of the gravity this chance encounter will have on their lives.

== Cast ==
=== Main ===
- Lee Na-young as Lee Joong-ah

Irish name Georgia Shaw, an intelligent medical intern who was adopted by an Irish family at the age of three, has a hippie-like eccentric personality. She tends to cook Korean food while in a good mood, and Irish food while in a bad mood. Having been completely accepted into the family, despite her ethnicity, she leads a peaceful life both in the United States and in Ireland. Her adoptive family protected her at all times, even in politically unstable Northern Ireland. Due to her Irish brother's serious involvement with the IRA, her parents are attacked and tragically killed. In order to save herself, Joong-ah is forced to turn her back on her brother and leave. Deeply traumatized and filled with guilt, she later laments and grieves this fact at her parents' graves. She felt then that she was no longer a doctor, nor a Shaw, believing that she brought the tragedy on all by herself. At the end of her mourning, she becomes determined to fly back to her native country Korea, only to fall in love with two men with quite opposite characters. First, there is Kang Gook, a bodyguard who is always there for her, but whom she doesn't love passionately. Her real passion is for Jae-bok, a drifter she saves by giving mouth-to-mouth resuscitation to as he was choking on the street.

- Kim Min-jun as Lee Jae-bok

A drifter with no sense of fashion or morality, talks much but does little. His mother has remarried and his younger sister was adopted to an Irish family. Although helplessly thoughtless and reckless, there are two things that truly make him genuine and sincere; his mother and his sister. He believes that his life doesn't matter if his mother is happy. With his extraordinary skill with women, he meets a young actress named Si-yeon and freeloads off of her. While she's out filming, he does the dishes and when she's home, he gives her a good massage. But he often loses his temper and breaks things, cursing and yelling. One day, a girl saves him by giving him mouth-to-mouth resuscitation. He first starts coming on to her, but eventually he falls in love with her. He is amazed to realize how one can feel ashamed and in turn change through the influence of another person. His hearts starts aching because of Joong-ah. He wants to change and become someone important in her life. He impulsively takes a job at a musical instrument manufacturing company but soon gets bored and quits. He then encounters Kang Gook, not realizing that he is Joong-ah's husband, and with Kang's influence begins training as a bodyguard. The friendship between Jae-bok and Kang Gook grows despite their different personalities.

- Kim Min-jung as Han Si-yeon

A young porn actress who used to be a famous child actress. A bit of a scatterbrain, but strong and full of energy. Her family was well-off and never worried about money until she finished middle school when her father's business went under. Since her family never had to work, her father's failure left her mother and her little sisters clueless. Si-yeon, the strongest daughter, went to work for a small porn movie production company to support her family. Confident with her perfectly gorgeous body, she aspires to be in a really successful movie someday. She is currently living with her older boyfriend Jae-bok, a drifter who's wise about life and knows how to make her happy. He never loses fights and is excellent in bed. One day at a movie premiere, she bumps into a silent bodyguard, Kang Gook, the type of a guy she would generally never show a bit of interest in. Kang mistakes her for the famous movie star he is to protect and later, when he finds out that Si-yeon is only wearing the same dress as the star, he mistakes her for a stalker. They keep bumping into each other here and there. Over time she develops feelings for him.

- Hyun Bin as Kang Gook

A handsome bodyguard who doesn't say much but always says the right thing. A survivor of a car accident on a family picnic when he was a little boy. His father's old friend, a former pastor and an artist raised Kang since then. Kang grew up enjoying martial arts and painting. He wanted to be an artist but was convinced that art was a tough way to make a living. Ironically, his job ended up being tougher than any other job; he became a bodyguard. He wants to protect Joong-ah, a damaged soul who suffers from a mental illness. He may in fact need her to suffer and depend on him so he can be a huge part of her life. Taking pleasure in helping others, he is a bodyguard in his love life, too. He was the happiest when Joong-ah bandaged his wound after an accident. The way they love is to share each other's pain. One day while doing his job trying to protect a famous actor, he bumps into little known porn actress Si-yeon. She hits him repeatedly in the face after she is knocked over by him, yelling and vowing that one day he will be hired as her bodyguard. Funny girl, he thinks. As they keep bumping into each other, he is attracted to her strong personality and falls in love with her. When she is around, he is no longer quiet. He even reads lines of a porn movie for her. It's awkward at first, but he finds a way to have fun with it. Realizing that she truly makes him happy, he begins to enjoy being with her.

=== Supporting ===
- Lee Hwi-hyang as Kim Boo-ja, Jae-bok's mother
- Kim In-tae as Han Sang-man, Jae-bok's stepfather
- Kim Sung-kyum as Si-yeon's father
- Youn Yuh-jung as Si-yeon's mother
- Lee Dae-yeon as Noh Dong-seok, Eastern medicine doctor
- Im Ye-jin as Kwon Byung-ran, doctor's wife
- Kim Chang-wan as Moon Jae-seok, Gook's godfather ("Pastor")
- Song Seung-hwan as President Park
- Yoon Ji-hye as Go Yang-sook
- Jung Seung-woo as Baek Ki-woong
- Park Kwang-jung
- Seo Ji-seok
- Lee Bong-gyu
- Yoon Chan
- Kim Kwang-kyu (cameo, ep. 2)

== Awards and nominations ==
Year	Award	Category	Recipient	Result
2004	MBC Drama Awards	Top Excellence Award, Actress	Lee Na-young	Nominated
2004	MBC Drama Awards	Best New Actor	Hyun Bin	Won
2004	MBC Drama Awards	Best New Actress	Kim Min-jung	Won
2004	MBC Drama Awards	Popularity Award, Actress	Lee Na-young	Won
2005	41st Baeksang Arts Awards	Best Drama	Ireland	Nominated
2005	41st Baeksang Arts Awards	Best New Director (TV)	Kim Jin-man	Won
2005	41st Baeksang Arts Awards	Best New Actor (TV)	Hyun Bin	Nominated
2005	41st Baeksang Arts Awards	Best Screenplay (TV)	In Jung-ok	Nominated
