= Yoon Ji-hye =

South Korean actress (born 1979)

- Born: November 10, 1979 (age 46); South Korea
- Education: Seoul Institute of the Arts - Theater
- Occupation: Actress
- Years active: 1998–present
- Agent(s): Quantum E&M

Korean name
- Hangul: 윤지혜
- Hanja: 尹智慧
- RR: Yun Jihye
- MR: Yun Chihye

Yoon Ji-hye (Korean: 윤지혜; born November 10, 1979) is a South Korean actress. Yoon made her acting debut in the 1998 horror movie Whispering Corridors. She has since starred in films such as Possible Changes (2004), No Mercy for the Rude (2006), and Kundo: Age of the Rampant, as well as the television series Que Sera, Sera (2007).

== Filmography ==
=== Film ===
Year	Title	Role
1998	Whispering Corridors	Kim Jung-sook
2000	Plum Blossom	Jeong Ha-ra
2000	Pisces	Hee-soo
2003	Spring Bears Love	Park Mi-ran
2004	Possible Changes	Lee Yoon-jung
2005	Never to Lose	Kim Tae-hee
2006	No Mercy for the Rude	Her
2010	Vegetarian	Hye-kyung
2014	Kundo: Age of the Rampant	Ma-hyang
2014	Phantoms of the Archive (short film)	
2020	Hot Blooded	In-Sook
2023	Past Lives	Nora's mom

=== Television series ===
Year	Title	Role	Network
1999	Hometown Legends: "Sinjo"	Warrior	KBS2
2004	Ireland	Go Yang-sook	MBC
2006	Drama City: "Shining All About"	Lee Soo-yeon	KBS2
2007	Que Sera Sera	Cha Hye-rin	MBC
2011	The Peak	Noh Yoon-hee	MBC
2011	Special Affairs Team TEN	Seo Yoo-rim	OCN
2012	Phantom	Goo Yeon-joo	SBS
2013	Special Affairs Team TEN 2	Seo Yoo-rim	OCN
2015	High Society	Jang Ye-won	SBS
2016	The Royal Gambler	Hong-mae	SBS
2016	Entourage	Yoon Se-na	tvN
2018	The Miracle We Met	Kwak Hyo-joo	KBS2
2018	Come and Hug Me	Han Ji-ho	MBC
2019	The Wind Blows	Baek Soo-ah	JTBC
2021	Navillera	Eun So-ri	tvN
2022	Jinxed at First	Mi-su	KBS
2024	The Tale of Lady Ok	Madam Kim	JTBC

=== Web series ===
Year	Title	Role	Network
2023	Queenmaker	Eun Seo-jin	Netflix

=== Music video appearances ===
Year	Song title	Artist
2000	"Can't Stand It"	Tashannie
2003	"Annie"	Yoon Jong-shin

== Theater ==
Year	Title	Role
2005	Closer	Soo-jung

== Awards and nominations ==
Year	Award	Category	Nominated work	Result
1998	19th Blue Dragon Film Awards	Best Supporting Actress	Whispering Corridors	Nominated
2000	21st Blue Dragon Film Awards	Best Supporting Actress	Plum Blossom	Nominated
2006	27th Blue Dragon Film Awards	Best Supporting Actress	No Mercy for the Rude	Nominated
2014	23rd Buil Film Awards	Best Supporting Actress	Kundo: Age of the Rampant	Nominated
2014	51st Grand Bell Awards	Best Supporting Actress	Kundo: Age of the Rampant	Nominated
2014	1st Korean Film Producers Association Awards	Best Supporting Actress	Kundo: Age of the Rampant	Won
