= Please Teach Me English =

- Theatrical release poster
- Hangul: 영어완전정복
- Hanja: 英語完全征服
- RR: Yeongeo wanjeon jeongbok
- MR: Yŏngŏ wanjŏn chŏngbok
- Directed by: Kim Sung-su
- Written by: No Hye-yeong; Choi Hee-dae; Kim Sung-su
- Produced by: Jo Min-hwan; Kim Sung-su
- Starring: Lee Na-young; Jang Hyuk
- Cinematography: Kim Hyung-koo
- Edited by: Nam Na-yeong
- Music by: Jo Seong-woo
- Distributed by: Cinema Service; Im Pictures Corp. Nabi Pictures
- Release date: 5 November 2003 (South Korea)
- Running time: 118 minutes
- Country: South Korea
- Languages: Korean; English

Please Teach Me English (Korean: 영어완전정복; lit. 'The Complete Mastering of English') is a 2003 South Korean romantic comedy film about a young woman who begins English lessons after she is unable to help a foreigner at her government office.

== Synopsis ==
Park Mun-su (Jang Hyuk) and Na Young-ju (Lee Na-young) are classmates in a private English class. Mun-su frequently chases women while working in his shoe shop. However, Young-ju has an unreciprocated interest in him. They eventually become friends, and frequently sit together in class.

One day, Young-ju boasts about a pig on her grandparents' farm who can recognize the English alphabet. The class decide to visit the pig, only to discover it has been eaten the same day and Young-ju just invented the whole story. Young-ju tries to train a piglet to recognize the alphabet; and when Mun-su finds out about her efforts, he tries to help her. However, the pig escapes, and has to be recaptured. The class and Young-ju's family have a party that night.

One day, while riding the bus, Young-ju catches Mun-su showing the photo of a woman who she mistakenly believes to be his girlfriend. Discouraged by this, Young-ju skips English classes. Her teacher, an Australian woman, tries to convince her to return to the classes. Young-ju attends a farewell party for the class, but Mun-su is not there. Afterwards she meets Mun-su's mother, who is looking for him. She discovers that his mother is about to meet the girl in the photo.

The girl, known as Victoria or Mun-young, speaks no Korean and needs Young-ju to translate. Dressed in a hanbok, Mun-su's mother and talking to Victoria, Young-ju, who thinks Victoria is her rival, purposefully translates incorrectly telling Victoria; "You looked more beautiful in the photo." Victoria is astonished. Young-ju tells Victoria that everybody hates her because she is not Korean. Victoria asks her to tell Mun-su's mother that she came with good intentions and leaves. Mun-su arrives to find his mother weeping. Young-ju hides. Victoria has checked out of the hotel, but Young-ju stops her car, and admits that she lied. Victoria reunites with Mun-su and his mother. Ashamed, Young-ju boards a train but Mun-su follows her, leaving his family behind. She tries to hide from him, but Mun-su finds Young-ju, loudly confessing to her that Victoria is not his girlfriend, but his long-lost sister from New York. They make up, kissing in the train, with the entire train cheering them on. They marry and have a baby.

== Cast ==
- Lee Na-young as Na Young-ju
- Jang Hyuk as Park Mun-su
- Angela Kelly as Catherine
- Na Moon-hee as Mun-su's mother
- Kim Yong-gun as Young-ju's father
- Kim Young-ae as Young-ju's mother
- Kim In-moon as Young-ju's grandfather
- Moon Mi-bong as Young-ju's grandmother
- Jung Sang-hoon as Young-ju's younger brother
- Lee Chang-hwan as Richard
- Baek Ye-young as Julie
- Jung Suk-yong as Tyson
- Hwang Hyo-eun as Betty
- Choi Joo-bong as Chief of district office
- Kang Nam-young as Bo-kyeong
- Lee So-eun as Mun-young
- Kim Sun-hwa as Madam
- Jo Jae-yoon as Manager Hong
- Jang Ji-soo as Miss Lee
- Yoo Hae-jin as Subway passenger (cameo)
- Lee Beom-soo as Subway passenger (cameo)
- Jung Doo-hong as Terrorist (cameo)
- Kim In-kwon as Sergeant (cameo)
