= The Chronicles of Evil =

- Theatrical poster
- Directed by: Beak Woon-hak
- Written by: Beak Woon-hak
- Produced by: Jang Won-seok; Jeong Ui-seok
- Starring: Son Hyun-joo; Ma Dong-seok; Choi Daniel; Park Seo-joon
- Cinematography: Park Jong-chul; Jung Chul-min
- Edited by: Steve M. Choe
- Music by: Hwang Sang-jun
- Production company: B.A. Entertainment
- Distributed by: CJ Entertainment
- Release date: May 14, 2015
- Running time: 102 minutes
- Country: South Korea
- Language: Korean
- Budget: US$3.4 million
- Box office: US$15.5 million

The Chronicles of Evil (Korean: 악의 연대기; RR: Agui yeondaegi) is a 2015 South Korean thriller film written and directed by Beak Woon-hak (or Baek Woon-hak), starring Son Hyun-joo, Ma Dong-seok, Choi Daniel and Park Seo-joon. The film was remade in Turkish as Kin (English title: Grudge) starring Yılmaz Erdoğan.

== Plot ==
Highly decorated homicide detective Choi Chang-sik has an enviable record and the respect of his peers. Days before a promotion, he dozes off on his way home after a celebratory drink with his colleagues. He wakes up to find that his taxi driver has taken him to a remote mountain trail and has pulled a knife on him to kill him. The two struggle, and Choi manages to kill the taxi driver in self-defense. At first, he tries to call the cops, but his superior calls him and reminds him to stay out of trouble before his promotion. Fearing that his career will be tarnished, he decides to covers up the crime scene and flees. The next day, the taxi driver's dead body has been strung up on a crane in front of the police station, and Choi is assigned to the case amidst widespread media attention. Choi's ordeal begins as he tries to misdirect the investigation and remove evidence, to the growing suspicion of rookie detective Cha Dong-jae. During the investigation, Choi manages to corner what seems to be a suspect in the murder, and learns that he was paid to move the taxi driver's body to the crane. Choi is then forced to kill him in self-defense. Then former movie star Jin Kyu turns himself in claiming to be the killer, and threatens to reveal the truth unless Choi reopens an old case.

It is revealed that years ago, several people in an illegal casino died from cyanide poisoning. Due to the pressure from the higher-ups, the police framed a mentally disabled man named Kim who worked there as culprit and created fake witnesses, who turned out to be the driver and the man that moved the driver's body. It turns out that Jin Kyu is Kim's son, and he deliberately sets Choi up to avenge his father. Choi is forced to declare that there is not enough evidence to convict Jin Kyu so they have to let him go. Later on, Jin Kyu declares he going to kill the Chief of Police because of his involvement in his father's case, and Choi is too late to save the chief as the bomb in his car explodes, killing him

Eventually, Choi confronts Jin Kyu and he reveals that he is not the mastermind, but rather it is his gay lover Cha Dong-Jae. Jin Kyu eventually dies of drug overdose. Choi pursues Cha Dong-Jae and he reveals that he was the culprit behind the cyanide poisoning and the real son of Kim. His mentally disabled father was always abused by the employers and customers of the illegal gambling so he decided to kill them all in revenge for the mistreatment by putting cyanide in their drinks. His father knows about it but decided to cover for his son. Despite Cha confessing his crime to the police to save his father, they still arrested and convicted his father anyway due to corruption.

After exposing Choi for the killing of the driver and the corruption Choi has committed in his father's case, Cha demands Choi kill him as he has nothing left to live for. Feeling guilty, Choi decides not to kill Cha and instead turn himself in to clear Cha's father name, but Cha committed suicide nevertheless. Choi cries over Cha's body and surrenders himself to the police for his past crime.

== Cast ==
- Son Hyun-joo as Detective Choi Chang-sik
- Ma Dong-seok as Detective Oh
- Choi Daniel as Kim Jin-kyu
- Park Seo-joon as Cha Dong-jae
- Jung Won-joong as Chief of police
- Woo Jung Kook as Kim Bong-soo
- Lee Jun-hyeok as Lee Myeong-cheon
- Lee Seung-ho as Supporting
- Jung Joon-won as Myeong-ho
- Bae Jin-woong as Gambler in the past
- Ji Dae-han as Apartment man
- Eom Ji-seong as Cha Dong-jae
- Han Geu-rim as Traffic situation room female employee
- Yoon Hee-won as Deputy head of department Kang
- Jang Joon-nyeong as Autopsy

== Release ==
The Chronicles of Evil was released in South Korean theaters on May 14, 2015. It opened at first place in the box office with 857,000 admissions in its first four days, grossing ₩6.91 billion (US$6.37 million). At the end of its run, it grossed a total of ₩17,361,815,332 (US$14,958,245) on 2,192,525 admissions.

== Awards and nominations ==
Year	Award	Category	Recipient	Result
2015	52nd Grand Bell Awards	Best Actor	Son Hyun-joo	Nominated
2015	52nd Grand Bell Awards	Best New Actor	Park Seo-joon	Nominated
2015	36th Blue Dragon Film Awards	Best New Actor	Park Seo-joon	Nominated
2015	36th Blue Dragon Film Awards	Popular Star Award	Park Seo-joon	Won
2016	52nd Baeksang Arts Awards	Best New Actor	Park Seo-joon	Nominated
