= Lee Na-young =

South Korean actress (born 1979)

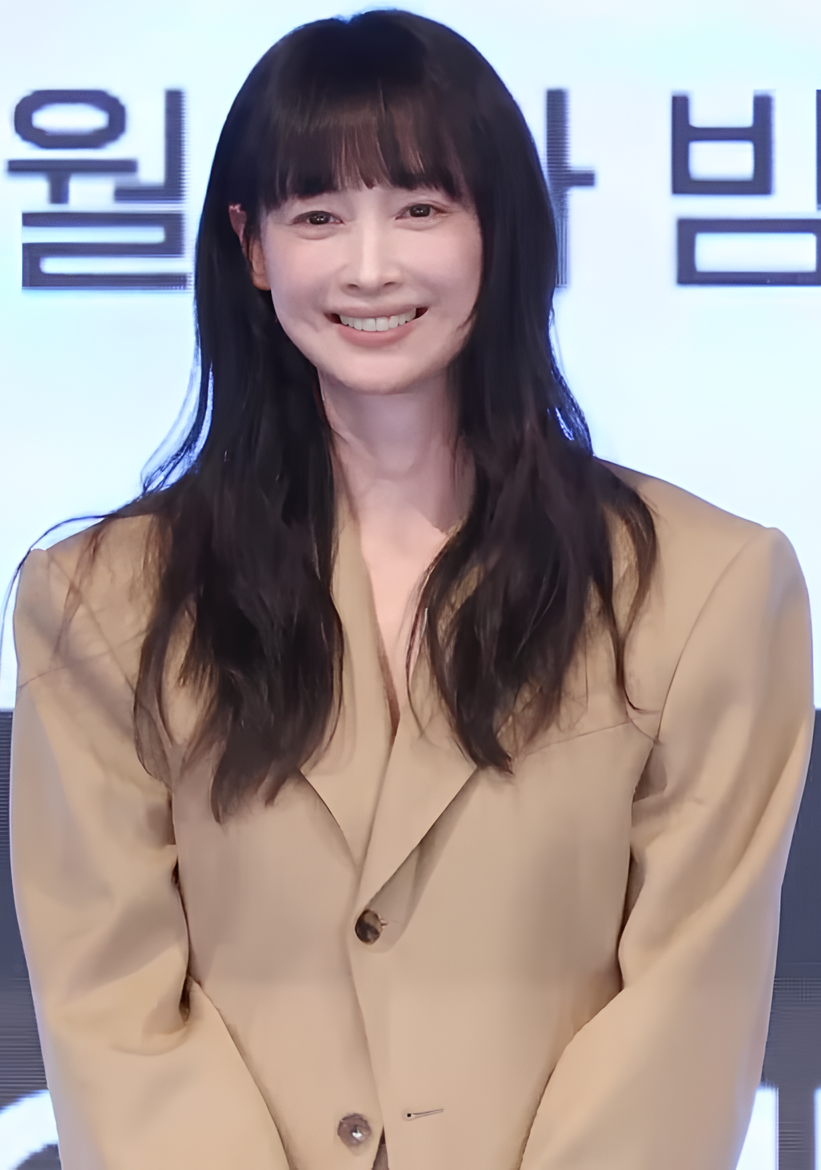
- Lee in 2026
- Born: February 22, 1979 (age 47); Hapjeong-dong, Mapo District, Seoul, South Korea
- Education: Shingu University (Majoring in Business)
- Occupation: Actress
- Years active: 1998–present
- Agent: Eden 9
- Height: 1.73 m (5 ft 8 in)
- Spouse: Won Bin (m. 2015)
- Children: 1

Korean name
- Hangul: 이나영
- RR: I Nayeong
- MR: I Nayŏng
- Website: Official website

Lee Na-young (Korean: 이나영; born February 22, 1979) is a South Korean actress. She is best known for her leading roles in television series such as Ruler of Your Own World (2002), Ireland (2004) and Romance Is a Bonus Book (2019), as well as the films Someone Special (2004) and Maundy Thursday (2006). Aside from acting, Lee is also known for appearing in numerous commercials.

== Career ==
Lee Na-young began her modeling career in a Jambangee Jeans TV commercial in 1998, then made her acting debut that same year. Following supporting roles in 1999 television dramas Did We Really Love?, KAIST, and Queen, Lee starred in the tepidly received 2001 Hong Kong sci-fi action film Dream of A Warrior starring Leon Lai. She also appeared in the 2001 music video for "Catherine's Wheel" by Britpop band Rialto.

But Lee rose to fame in 2002 with the critically acclaimed series Ruler of Your Own World. She played an indie rock musician who unexpectedly falls for a terminally ill grifter, and Lee and her fellow cast members were praised for their realistic, nuanced acting. She later reunited with Ruler of Your Own World screenwriter In Jung-ok for Ireland, a 2004 drama about a Korean adoptee who journeys to her homeland, but its reception was less positive.

During this time, Lee had become one of the top-ranked and highest-paid commercial models, endorsing diverse products such as cosmetics (notably Laneige and Lancôme), electronics, clothing lines, beverages, food, telecommunications, and construction companies. Lee later became the first Korean to appear on the cover of fashion magazine W Korea, for its November 2009 issue.

But unlike her graceful and glamorous public persona in advertisements, her image in film has been the opposite, with Lee choosing to portray women who are awkward and eccentric. In 2002, she starred in the cyber romance Who R. U.? as an introverted character similar to her role in Ruler of Your Own World. Lee then played a quirky, English-challenged civil servant in Kim Sung-su's comedy film Please Teach Me English (2003) and the harmless stalker of a struggling baseball player in Jang Jin's romantic comedy Someone Special (2004). She won several Best Actress prizes for Someone Special, notably from the prestigious Blue Dragon Film Awards.

Lee again drew praise in 2006, this time for her dramatic chops in Maundy Thursday, Song Hae-sung's film adaptation of Gong Ji-young's novel Our Happy Time about a suicidal rape victim who develops a close bond with a death row inmate. She next played an emotionally tormented sleepwalker in Kim Ki-duk's Dream (2008), and nearly died while filming a scene where her character hangs herself.

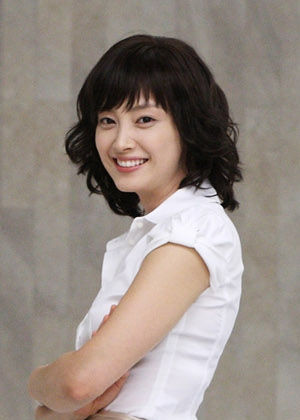
Lee in 2010

In 2010, Lee headlined Lady Daddy, playing a trans woman photographer whose life is disrupted with the sudden arrival of a young boy who claims that she's his biological father. To promote the film, she made a guest appearance in the sitcom High Kick Through the Roof. Lee then returned to television with the big-budget action-mystery series The Fugitive: Plan B, in which she performed her own action scenes without a stunt double.

When Lee's contract with talent agency KeyEast expired in 2011 (she had signed with KeyEast in 2006, and with the William Morris Agency in 2009), she joined Eden 9 Entertainment. In 2012, she starred in Yoo Ha's suspense thriller Howling, about a veteran detective (played by Song Kang-ho) who teams up with a female rookie (Lee) to solve a series of murders involving a mysterious wolfdog.

In 2013, Lee appeared in a minor role in the two-part Japanese film SPEC: Close. She then played an actress having a secret romance with a boom operator in Sad Scene; it was among the three short films in the omnibus Woman, Man commissioned by W Korea for its 10th anniversary in 2015.

In 2018, Lee returned to the silver screen with the North Korean refugee drama Beautiful Days, which premiered at the 23rd Busan International Film Festival.

In 2019, Lee returned to the small screen after nine years by starring in the romance comedy drama Romance Is a Bonus Book alongside Lee Jong-suk. She played a main character named Kang Dan-yi who is a new temporary worker of book publishing company.

In 2026, Lee starred in ENA's mystery legal thriller television series Honour alongside Jung Eun-chae and Lee Chung-ah. It is based on the Swedish television series Heder which evolves around a 20-year-old secret that the three lawyer friends buried, which resurfaces and throws their lives into chaos.

== Personal life ==
Lee married actor Won Bin on May 30, 2015, in a small, private ceremony in a wheat field near an inn in Won's hometown, Jeongseon County, Gangwon Province, South Korea. The couple belong to the same talent agency, Eden 9, and reportedly began dating in August 2012 (though the agency only confirmed the relationship in July 2013). A press release from Eden 9 on December 19, 2015, announced that Lee had given birth to the couple's first child, a son.

== Filmography ==
=== Film ===
Year	Title	Role	Notes
1999	Eiji	Mae-hwa	Japanese film
2001	Dream of a Warrior	Shosho	
2002	Who R. U.?	Seo In-joo	
2003	Please Teach Me English	Na Young-ju	
2004	Someone Special	Han Yi-yeon	
2004	Sweet Home		short film
2004	Leaving Me, Loving You	(cameo)	Hong Kong film
2006	Maundy Thursday	Moon Yu-jeong	
2008	Dream	Ran	
2010	Lady Daddy	Ji-hyeon	
2012	Howling	Cha Eun-young	
2013	SPEC: Close	Woman who speaks Korean	Japanese film
2015	Woman, Man		segment: "Sad Scene"
2018	Beautiful Days	Mother	

=== Television series ===
Year	Title	Role	Notes/Ref.
1998	One Day Suddenly	So-hee, a ghost	(bit part)
1998	Three Guys and Three Girls		(bit part)
1998	MBC Best Theater: "What Was I to You?"		
1999	KAIST	Lee Hye-sung	
1999	Did We Really Love?	Kang Jae-young	
1999	MBC Best Theater: "Goodbye Audrey Hepburn"		one act-drama
1999	Queen	Oh Soon-jung	
1999	Magic Castle	Hong Yoon-hee	
1999	Love Story: "Message"	So-young	
2000	Cool Friends	Broadcasting writer Lee Na-young	
2002	Ruler of Your Own World	Jeon Kyung	
2004	Ireland	Lee Joong-ah	
2009	High Kick Through the Roof	Lee Na-bong	Cameo (episode 85)
2010	The Fugitive: Plan B	Jini	
2019	Romance Is a Bonus Book	Kang Dan-yi	
2026	Honour	Yoon Ra-young	

=== Web series ===
Year	Title	Role	Ref.
2023	One Day Off	Park Ha-kyung	

=== Music video appearances ===
Year	Song title	Artist
1998	"Kiss Me"	Park Jin-young
1998	"The Last Lie"	Yoon Sang
1998	"Miracle"	Kim Dong-ryool feat. Lee So-eun
2000	"Only You Wouldn't Know"	As One
2000	"My Love"	Im Chang-jung
2001	"Catherine's Wheel"	Rialto
2001	"Goodbye, My Love"	Jo Sung-mo
2006	"Eternal Love"	Lee Seung-chul

== Accolades ==
=== Awards and nominations ===
Year	Award	Category	Nominated work	Result	Ref.
2002	MBC Drama Awards	Excellence Award, Actress in a Miniseries	Ruler of Your Own World	Won	
2003	39th Baeksang Arts Awards	Best Actress – Television	Ruler of Your Own World	Nominated	
2004	25th Blue Dragon Film Awards	Best Leading Actress	Someone Special	Won	
2004	12th Chunsa Film Art Awards	Best Actress	Someone Special	Won	
2004	5th Women in Film Korea Awards	Best Actress	Someone Special	Won	
2004	MBC Drama Awards	Top Excellence Award, Actress	Ireland	Nominated	
2004	MBC Drama Awards	Popularity Award, Actress	Ireland	Won	
2006	6th Korea Advertisers Association	Good Model Award	—N/a	Won	
2006	27th Blue Dragon Film Awards	Best Leading Actress	Maundy Thursday	Nominated	
2007	1st Korea Broadcast Advertising Festival - Model Awards	Best Partner Award	—N/a	Won	
2007	41st Taxpayer's Day	Prime Minister's Commendation	—N/a	Won	
2010	KBS Drama Awards	Excellence Award, Actress in a Mid-length Drama	The Fugitive: Plan B	Nominated	
2023	59th Grand Bell Awards	Best Actress in a Series	One Day Off	Nominated	

=== Listicles ===
Name of publisher, year listed, name of listicle, and placement
Publisher	Year	Listicle	Placement	Ref.
Forbes	2011	Korea Power Celebrity 40	24th	
Korean Film Council	2021	Korean Actors 200 (Note: Introduces 200 actors that best represent the present and future of Korean cinema to the people in the film industry all over the world.)	Included	
