= Kundo: Age of the Rampant =

- Theatrical poster
- Hangul: 군도: 민란의 시대
- Hanja: 群盜: 民亂의 時代
- RR: Gundo: millanui sidae
- MR: Kundo: millanŭi sidae
- Directed by: Yoon Jong-bin
- Written by: Jeon Cheol-hong
- Story by: Yoon Jong-bin
- Produced by: Yoon Jong-bin; Yoo Jeong-hun
- Starring: Ha Jung-woo; Gang Dong-won
- Cinematography: Choi Chan-min
- Edited by: Kim Sang-bum; Kim Jae-bum
- Music by: Jo Yeong-wook
- Distributed by: Showbox/Mediaplex
- Release date: July 23, 2014
- Running time: 137 minutes
- Country: South Korea
- Language: Korean
- Budget: US$35.9 million

Kundo: Age of the Rampant (Korean: 군도: 민란의 시대) is a 2014 South Korean period action film starring Ha Jung-woo and Gang Dong-won, and directed by Yoon Jong-bin. Set in mid-19th century Joseon, it is about a power struggle between the unjust wealthy noblemen who run society and a group of righteous outlaws who steal from corrupt officials to give to the downtrodden and starving.

== Plot ==
The year is 1862. The late Joseon dynasty was a period of social and economic unrest in Korea, and it was also a time of great tyranny. Due to continuous natural disasters and poor harvests, poverty, hunger and death are rampant. The aristocracy rule the country and, concerned only with their own wealth, they exploit and persecute the poor. In these turbulent times, the Chusul clan, a notorious bandit group, rise against the authorities. They raid corrupt officials, then share their loot with the vulnerable and impoverished. Their members believe that their cause is more important than their own lives.

The film opens with a raid of the mansion of Governor Choi, who rules the Naju region. The clan confiscates the mansion's rice stores, distributes them to the poor and summarily execute Choi and his retinue. Elsewhere, Dol Mo-chi, a poor butcher, is asked by Jo Yoon, a young nobleman to perform a hit on a young woman for a hefty sum. When the time comes, Mo-chi could not commit the deed and allows the woman to escape. The following night, he found himself ambushed, locked inside his house along with his family while it is set ablaze. Mo-chi survives, and confronts Jo Yoon. He is harhly beaten. Taken into prison, he is due to be executed that very night, Jo Yoon having bribed the new governor to do so.

Jo Yoon's backstory is revealed: born the son of a gisaeng (a Joseon-era female entertainer) and the nobleman Joo Won-sook, he was raised as Won-sook's heir due to the man's lack of sons. This changed when Won-sook's wife gave birth to a son, Seo-in, resulting in Yoon's position being displaced. He grew into a bitter, proud and cunning young man who gained a great proficiency of martial arts. Flash forward to the present, it is revealed that Seo-in was among the dead in the Choi mansion raid and the woman who Dol Mo-chi was sent to kill being Seo-in's pregnant wife, her child a potential threat to Yoon's newfound inheritance of the Joo family fortune.

Dol Mo-chi is rescued by the bandits and taken back to their base at the foot of Mt. Jisu, Seo-in's wife with them. Dae-ho, their leader, welcomes the butcher into their ranks, rechristening him as "Dochi". In the next two years, Dochi trains hard and quickly becomes one of the most feared bandits in all of the land. He also raises Seo-in's son as his own, the child's mother having passed from the birth.

In those two years, Jo Yoon, through a series of fraudulent contracts that take advantage of the common folk's illiteracy, takes over all of the land in Naju, while enslaving its inhabitants. Enraged, the bandits stage a daring raid on Naju, with Dochi confronting Jo Yoon, his tormentor. After a brief fight, Dochi lures Jo Yoon out to an ambush staged by Dae-ho while the rest of the bandits ransack the rice stores and redistribute them to the common folk of Naju. Jo Yoon manages to escape the ambush with his life, killing Dae-ho in the process and heavily wounding Dochi.

In the aftermath of the raid, Jo Yoon exacts brutal revenge on the citizenry, imprisoning them en masse. Ttaeng-choo, one of the bandits, finds himself captured and forced to reveal the bandits' mountain hideout through gruesome torture. Jo Yoon leads a force of government soldiers on a counter-raid of the hideout, burning down the base and inflicting heavy casualties, all while taking back his brother's son. Dochi, healing in a nearby monastery, makes it back too late and swears revenge.

The following morning, the survivors of the counter-raid are scheduled to be executed by hanging. Dochi crashes the execution with a Gatling gun, mowing down many of the troops. The Naju populace, already incensed from the many injustices committed against them, join Dochi on one final attack on the Joo family mansion. Jo Yoon greets his adversary calmly, despite losing everything. Standing in front of Jo Yoon, Dolchi challenges his arch-enemy to a final duel. The duel continues into the nearby bamboo forest, with Dochi finally dealing a mortal wound on Jo Yoon, who could not dodge properly due to cradling his nephew on his arm while fighting. Jo Yoon is promptly finished off by the Naju mob, who drive a spear into his back.

Dochi, now the de facto leader of the bandits, takes back his child and rides into the sunset with the remaining bandits and the Naju citizens who had joined him, continuing the Chusul clan's fight another day.

== Cast ==
- Ha Jung-woo as Dol Mo-chi/Dochi, a former butcher (an occupation which was in the cheonmin caste) who joins a makeshift band of outlaws to avenge the deaths of his family members.
- Gang Dong-won as Jo Yoon, a nobleman's son who is gifted in martial arts, but he has no rights as his mother was only a concubine and his father refuses to acknowledge him after the birth of a new son.
  - Nam Da-reum as young Jo Yoon
- Lee Geung-young as Ttaeng-choo, mood-maker and recruiter of the band. He is a monk by trade.
- Lee Sung-min as Dae-ho, leader of the band
- Cho Jin-woong as Lee Tae-ki, a thief who used to be an aristocrat
- Ma Dong-seok as Cheon-bo, the band's powerhouse
- Yoon Ji-hye as Ma-hyang, the band's archer
- Joo Jin-mo as Song Young-gil
- Song Young-chang as Jo Won-sook
- Jung Man-sik as Butler Yang
- Kim Byeong-ok as Toposa
- Kim Jong-gu as Choi Hyun-ki
- Kim Sung-kyun as Jang
- Kang Hyun-joong as Park
- Kim Jae-young as Geum-san
- Jung Yi-seo as Si-ra
- Im Hyeon-seong as Yeom-tong
- Lee David as Jo Seo-in
- Woo Jeong-guk as Citizen 1
- Choe Yeong-do as Citizen 2
- Park Myung-shin as Choi's wife
- Cho Seon-mook as Foreigner
- Kim Sam-il as Jang's father
- Noh Gang-min as young Lee
- Eom Ji-seong as Joong-man-yi
- Jang Woo-jin as Warehouse constable 1
- Park Song-taek as Warehouse constable 2
- Yeon Jun-won as Kundo 1
- Eom Ji-man as Kundo 2
- Kim Tae-su as Jo Yoon's slave 1
- Yoon Kyung-ho as Jo Yoon's slave 2
- Ri Min as Tribute government official
- Heo Ji-hye as Former gisaeng
- Jeon Seong-ae as Former midwife
- Jeong Dae-yong as Oksa elder
- Kim Hae-sook as Dolmuchi's mother
- Han Ye-ri as Gok-ji

== Box office ==
Kundo: Age of the Rampant drew 551,848 viewers on its first day in theaters on July 23, 2014, grossing ₩4.08 billion (or US$3.997 million). This was the all-time highest opening day box office in South Korea, for both a foreign and domestic film, breaking previous records set by Transformers: Dark of the Moon (2011) and Secretly, Greatly (2013) (Kundo's record would shortly be broken eight days later by The Admiral: Roaring Currents. It reached 3.1 million viewers in five days.

== Awards and nominations ==
Year	Award	Category	Recipient	Result
2014	23rd Buil Film Awards	Best Supporting Actress	Yoon Ji-hye	Nominated
2014	23rd Buil Film Awards	Best Cinematography	Choi Chan-min	Nominated
2014	23rd Buil Film Awards	Best Art Direction	Park Il-hyun	Nominated
2014	23rd Buil Film Awards	Best Music	Jo Yeong-wook	Won
2014	34th Korean Association of Film Critics Awards	Best Cinematography	Choi Chan-min	Won
2014	34th Korean Association of Film Critics Awards	Best Music	Jo Yeong-wook	Won
2014	51st Grand Bell Awards	Best Actor	Gang Dong-won	Nominated
2014	51st Grand Bell Awards	Best Supporting Actress	Yoon Ji-hye	Nominated
2014	51st Grand Bell Awards	Best Art Direction	Park Il-hyun	Nominated
2014	51st Grand Bell Awards	Best Costume Design	Jo Sang-gyeong	Won
2014	51st Grand Bell Awards	Best Music	Jo Yeong-wook	Nominated
2014	51st Grand Bell Awards	Technical Award (visual effects)	Lee Jeon-hyeong, Jo Yong-seok	Nominated
2014	22nd Korea Culture and Entertainment Awards	Excellence Award, Actor in a Film	Jung Man-sik	Won
2014	35th Blue Dragon Film Awards	Best Supporting Actor	Lee Sung-min	Nominated
2014	35th Blue Dragon Film Awards	Best Cinematography	Choi Chan-min	Won
2014	35th Blue Dragon Film Awards	Best Lighting	Yu Yeong-jong	Won
2014	35th Blue Dragon Film Awards	Best Art Direction	Park Il-hyun	Nominated
2014	35th Blue Dragon Film Awards	Best Music	Jo Yeong-wook	Won
2014	35th Blue Dragon Film Awards	Technical Award (martial arts)	Jung Doo-hong, Kang Young-mook	Nominated
2014	1st Korean Film Producers Association Awards	Best Supporting Actress	Yoon Ji-hye	Won
2014	1st Korean Film Producers Association Awards	Best Music	Jo Yeong-wook	Won
2015	20th Chunsa Film Art Awards	Best Actor	Ha Jung-woo	Won
