= The Fugitive: Plan B =

2010 South Korean TV series

- Promotional poster
- Hangul: 도망자 플랜 B
- Hanja: 逃亡者 플랜 B
- RR: Domangja peullaen B
- MR: Tomangja p'ŭllaen B
- Genre: Action, Romance, Comedy
- Written by: Cheon Sung-il
- Directed by: Kwak Jung-hwan
- Starring: Rain; Lee Na-young; Lee Jung-jin; Yoon Jin-seo; Daniel Henney
- Opening theme: Crazy Bounce
- Ending theme: "Running and Running" and "Bang Bang Bang" MBLAQ
- Country of origin: South Korea
- Original languages: Korean; English
- No. of episodes: 20

Production
- Production locations: Korea; Manila, Philippines
- Running time: 60 minutes on Wednesdays and Thursdays at 21:55 (KST)

Original release
- Network: Korean Broadcasting System
- Release: September 29 – December 8, 2010

The Fugitive: Plan B (Korean: 도망자 플랜 B; RR: Domangja peullaen B) is a 2010 South Korean action television series, starring Rain and Lee Na-young. It aired on KBS2 from September 29 to December 8, 2010, on Wednesdays and Thursdays at 21:55 for 20 episodes.

The series was directed by Kwak Jung-hwan and written by Cheon Sung-il, the same team behind The Slave Hunters. The rights to the series were sold to seven countries in Asia including Japan, Taiwan, the Philippines, Thailand, Hong Kong, China, Singapore, Malaysia and Indonesia.

== Plot ==
Prior to the series' timeline, Ji-woo, a young, rich and cunning Korean private investigator handled the case of an Asian couple who died at a casino in Las Vegas. He solved the case in a single day, concluding that it was a suicide. As a result, Ji-woo received a large amount of money as the reward from the casino's owner General Wei and became renowned for being the first private investigator in the world to solve a case in a single day.

Shortly after the case was concluded, his Korean-American best friend Kevin was murdered. The Korean police acquired some mysterious evidence framing Ji-Woo for his friend's death. The Korean police issued a warrant to arrest Ji-woo and Squad Leader Officer Do-Soo was appointed for this case.

A year later, Ji-woo is approached by a woman named Jini, who asks Ji-woo to find a person called Melchidec and offers 100 million won as a reward to solve her case. Jini believes that Melchidec was the one who had killed off her family and that she will be his next target. Jini deliberately mentions Kevin's name, stating that she knew who killed him.

Surprised by this, Ji-woo investigates Jini's past. He discovers that the Asian couple who had died in Las Vegas were Jini's adoptive parents her uncle and aunt). He had "solved" that case by concluding it was a suicide, after finding a suicide note in the hotel. Jini had chosen Ji-woo to investigate the case because she wanted revenge on him for wrongly concluding that her adoptive parents' death was a suicide rather than a murder. Thus, she was indifferent to Ji-woo's safety by involving him in the case. Jini knew that Ji-woo will also try hard to solve this case, as his friend Kevin had also been a victim of Melchidec.

Kai is Jini's boyfriend and a rich businessman, who hires several people to keep an eye on Ji-woo and Jini. He desperately tries to save Jini from being killed by Melchidec, by any means. He learns that Yang Du-hi, with whom he has worked for many years, is Melchidec. Despite his initial surprise, but in order to save Jini, he meets with Yang Du-hi through his secretary, Sophie, who is actually working for Yang Du-hi. It is revealed that the reason why Melchidec had killed Jini's parents and adoptive parents is that she is in possession of the Joseon bank note, which is the key to finding a large amount of gold that mysteriously went missing after the Korean war. Kai strikes a deal with Yang Du-hi (a.k.a. Melchidec) to find the Joseon bank note (from the Bank Of Korea) for the latter, on the condition that Yang Du-hi will leave Jini alone and will ensure her safety. To hide Yang's crimes, Kai comes up with the idea of framing Ji-woo as the murderer of Kevin and Jini's family.

Ji-woo discovers the link to the Joseon bank note through his investigations, but is arrested by Officer Do-soo in Macau. As Ji-woo is taken back to Korea, Yang Du-hi's people provide Senior Officer Oh, a corrupt police officer, with the fake evidence against Ji-woo, thus framing him for the murder of Kevin and Jini's family. Meanwhile, Kai brings Jini to Macau to meet with Yang Du-hi and General Wei, and shows Jini the evidence that Yang Du-hi had fabricated. Jini is shocked by the evidence and believes Kai. She visits Ji-woo in police custody and tells him that she knows that he is Melchidec, leaving him confused.

While interrogating Ji-woo, Officer Do-soo presents the fabricated evidence against him. Ji-woo is stunned by the evidence and suspects Kai to be a part of Melchidec. While Ji-woo is being led to the DA's office after the interrogation, he escapes by unlocking his cuffs with a straw he stole from Do-soo's coffee. He then contacts Jini immediately and tells her that he was not the one who killed her family and that Kai is working along with Yang Du-hi, who is the real Melchidec. Meanwhile, Do-soo is framed for Ji-woo's escape.

Ji-woo manages to find Jini and convinces her that Kai is actually in cahoots with Yang Du-hi. They both find Kai in conversation with Yang. Jini confronts Kai and breaks up with him. An ambush from Yang's people leads to the capture of Ji-woo, Jini and Kai. They are tied up and taken to the office of Professor Hwang Mi-jin (Yoon Son-ha), who is Yang Du-hi's assistant. They meet Yang Du-hi, who reveals himself to be Melchidec and the murderer of Jini's family. From then on, Ji-woo explains the story behind Yang Du-hi.

Yang Du-hi was one of the soldiers who were awarded medals by the Korean government for his contribution in the Korean war. After the Korean war, some soldiers, including Yang Du-hi and Jini's grandfather, Jin Junggil, were appointed to bring a huge amount of gold bullion to the South from the North. During this time, Yang and Jini's grandfather worked together to steal the gold for themselves. Yang killed the rest of the soldiers while Jini's grandfather did the work of stealing the gold. Jini's grandfather, however, betrayed Yang and kept the gold for himself, burying all the gold to hide it from Yang. After learning about this, Yang Du-hi killed Jini's grandfather in order to find the gold, but in vain.

Yang Du-hi is now worried that his reputation, as well as his son's, would be ruined if people discover the truth about the missing gold bullion and Yang Du-hi's crimes. His son is a rising politician, who is standing for election to the office of the President of Korea, and the truth would destroy his career. Thus, in order to hide his crimes and find the gold, Yang Du-hi killed Jini's entire family and is now after Jini.

After Ji-woo's revelation, Yang Du-hi orders Hwang Mi-jin to kill Ji-woo and Jini, but they manage to escape and continue their search for the gold bullion. Meanwhile, Nakamura Hwang, who is the top private investigator in Asia and Ji-woo's mentor, wants to be the one to solve Jini's case because of the huge sum of money involved. Nakamura steals Ji-woo's documents and learns about the gold. He then approaches Mi-jin and they work together, using the stolen documents, to find the gold. At the same time, Ji-woo contacts Officer Do-soo, who reluctantly agrees to help him solve the case.

Through clues provided by Ji-woo, Do-soo follows Nakamura and Mi-jin to the location of the gold. The police arrive just in time to arrest Hwang Mi-jin and her accomplices, but Mi-jin is shot by an unknown person hired by Yang Du-hi. The next day, the corrupt officer Oh released all the people arrested by Do-soo and hands over the gold to Yang Du-hi. This makes Do-soo believe that Ji-woo is not the actual murderer of Kevin and that Kevin's murder is in fact a diversion to a much larger plot which is being carried out by Yang Du-hi.

Yang decides to melt the gold using an illegal chemical. Ji-woo informs Do-soo, who goes to the location where the gold is about to be melted. After a fight, in which a fellow police office is injured, Do-soo manages to get the gold and capture Yang Du-hi. When he is brought to the police station, Officer Oh fires Do-soo and releases Yang Du-hi. At the same time, Hwang Mi-jin and her doctor disappear together.

Frustrated by the loss of his job, Do-soo prepares to leave the country, taking with him the gold bullion that he had stored in his car while arresting Yang Du-hi. Ji-woo tracks him down and retrieves the gold with Sophie's (Kai's secretary) help. Jini contacts Yang Du-hi, tells him that she has the gold and asks him to meet her alone. Instead, Yang sends Dr Lee (Hwang Mi-jin's murderer) to kill Kai, Ji-woo and Jini. Kai, Jini and Ji-woo arrive at the pre-arranged location and Ji-woo hides himself. Kai tells Jini that he still loves her, but Jini refuses to forgive him for his past behaviour. When Dr Lee is about to shoot Jini, Ji-woo subdues him and hands him over to Do-soo, who is now looking to solve this case to reinstate his post as a police officer. Officer Choi, a friend of Do-soo, is put on the case.

Kai, who still loves Jini, asks for help from Yang Young-joon, Yang Du-hi's son. Yang Young-joon has no idea of his father's crimes, which Kai reveals to him. Kai then asks him to save Jini. Young-joon is both shocked and worried about his future after learning about his father's crimes. He promises Kai that he will do everything he can to keep Jini safe and later meets Jini to apologize to her on behalf of his father.

A few days later, Kai's secretary, Sophie, who is in love with him, confronts Yang Du-hi to kill him to keep Kai safe. However, she fails to kill him and is captured by Yang Du-hi's assistant, who ties her up and brings her to an unknown location. Kai is also captured and brought to the same location, where he and Sophie are shocked to see Hwang Mi-jin alive. Mi-jin explains that she also wants to destroy Yang Du-hi and provides Kai with some evidence that reveals Yang Du-hi's crimes. Mi-jin asks Kai to pass the evidence to the press and hand over all the gold bullion held by Jini. Kai agrees and passes the evidence to the press, along with a description of his own involvement with Yang Du-hi, so as to make it up to Jini. Kai also learns that Young-joon and Mi-jin are collaborating and that Young-joon is against his own father.

Meanwhile, Young-joon is informed of the spreading of the news of his father's crimes in the foreign press. He immediately orders his men to stop the spread of the news and decides to meet Jini for the last time. Ji-woo asks Do-soo for help in recording the whole conversation between Jini and Young-joon, where Young-joon tells Jini to leave the country, saying that he will not apologize for his father's crimes. After saying this, he leaves Jini alone to be assaulted by his men. Ji-woo comes to her rescue and saves her. Do-soo also tries to save the recorder and fights with Young-joon's men. In the chaos, Officer So-ran, who was trying to save Do-soo from being stabbed by Young-joon's men, ends up being stabbed herself. Ji-woo is shocked to see Officer So-ran dead and starts blaming himself for So-ran's death and Do-soo's involvement in his case. Officer Choi consoles Do-soo and tells him to continue to solve the case in order to avenge So-ran's death. After gathering enough evidence to prove Ji-woo's innocence, he clears Ji-woo of all charges.

At a press conference held by Young-joon, the presidential candidate, Jini interrupts the proceedings by playing the taped conversation between her and Young-joon in front of the press. Young-joon deflects the ensuing questions by claiming that anyone can fabricate this type of evidence. The press asks Jini if she has the gold, which is the key to solving the case, but she refuses to answer and is taken away by the security.

Meanwhile, Ji-woo is in his office and is taking out all his certificates out of frustration. While taking out the second one, a gold bullion drops out. He realizes that Jini has hidden one of the gold bars in his office as a Plan B. Ji-woo immediately leaves for the press conference that Jini interrupted and arrives just in time to present the gold, and thereby the truth about Yang Du-hi, to the world media. Ji-woo also expresses his love for Jini. Doo-soo arrests Yang Du-hi and Hwang Mi-jin, as well as their accomplices. It is revealed that Nakamura has the gold and is spending it lavishly. Ji-woo and Jini both suspect Nakamura to be in possession of the gold and set out to find it.

== Cast ==
=== Main ===
- Rain as Ji-woo

A private investigation administrator and the head of the Korean office in Asia Pacific region of International Detective Association. He's good looking, lives luxuriously, has a global business and carries romances in every country he goes to. Ji-woo's only problem is that he is the prime suspect in the murder of his long-time partner and friend Kevin. One day, an attractive woman comes to him as a client and he will soon face a violatile case with an outcome even he can't predict. He is depicted as a man who only cares about money but later on he falls in love with Jini.
The official KBS website spells Ji-woo's name as "Gee-woo", despite the use of Ji-woo in the series.

- Lee Na-young as Jini

Jini has experienced the world and pursued ambitious dreams. Jini was adopted by her uncle after the death of her parents. Then Jini's adoptive parents were killed. The only clue Jini has of the perpetrator is a mysterious figure named Melchidec. Jini believes Melchidec killed her foster parents and soon will kill her. She now approaches private detective Ji-Woo, who was involved in her foster parents murder in Las Vegas. Kai is her first love interest whereas until later on she falls in love with Ji-woo.

- Daniel Henney as Kai

An international shipping businessman and a core lobbyist connecting Asia with North America. From a young age Kai has acquired power, fortune, and intricate network connections. He is also the only person Jini can trust and love. Because of the threat Jini feels over her life and anyone that comes close to her, she pushes Kai away. When Jini drags Ji-woo into her foster parents investigation, Kai uses all of his fortune and personnel networking to save her from being killed. However, he is involved in the murder of Jini's family.

- Lee Jung-jin as Do-soo

A detective. He comes from a poor background, so he works obsessively to have overachieve. Do-soo gets shot by Ji-woo and his pride is wounded. Moreover, he is passed over for a promotion.

- Yoon Jin-seo as Yoon So-ran

A female detective working with Do-soo. So-ran is not skilled at martial arts, but stubbornly attempts to complete. She believes Do-soo's kindness to her is a sign of affection from him. So-ran never thinks that her affections for Do-soo might be one-sided. Her pressure to arrest Ji-woo makes Do-soo indifferent to her. Her efforts at chasing Do-soo is later rewarded.

- Song Jae-ho as Yang Doo-Ui

Men who called Melchidec and he killed Jini's parents, and her adopted parents

- Sung Dong-il as Nakamura Hwang

A renowned Japanese-Korean private investigator who was Ji-woo's mentor, based in Tokyo.

- Yoon Son-ha as Hwang Mi-Jin

=== Supporting ===
- Jo Hee-bong as James Bong

Ji-woo's rival, private investigator in South-East Asia.

- Claudia Kim as Sophie

Kai assistant and she has feelings for him.

- Takako Uehara as Kieko

Ji-woo's Japanese girlfriend.

- Oh Ji-ho as Kelvin

Ji-woo's deceased partner.

- Naoto Takenaka as Hiroki

Kieko's father and leader of yakuza

- Ti Lung as General Wei

Ji-woo's friend, as well as Kai's business partner.

== Ratings ==
Date	Episode	Nationwide	Seoul
2010-09-29	01	21.7% (2nd)	21.4% (2nd)
2010-09-30	02	17.3% (4th)	17.2% (4th)
2010-10-06	03	15.9% (3rd)	16.1% (3rd)
2010-10-07	04	16.0% (3rd)	16.6% (3rd)
2010-10-13	05	15.5% (2nd)	16.0% (2nd)
2010-10-14	06	12.0% (6th)	12.2% (7th)
2010-10-20	07	11.9% (8th)	12.5% (4th)
2010-10-21	08	11.6% (9th)	12.3% (7th)
2010-10-27	09	12.7% (6th)	13.3% (5th)
2010-10-28	10	13.1% (8th)	13.5% (6th)
2010-11-03	11	13.8% (3rd)	13.9% (3rd)
2010-11-04	12	13.8% (4th)	14.6% (4th)
2010-11-10	13	12.3% (7th)	12.4% (6th)
2010-11-11	14	13.9% (4th)	14.2% (5th)
2010-11-17	15	12.2% (6th)	12.3% (7th)
2010-11-18	16	13.9% (6th)	14.2% (5th)
2010-11-24	17	14.3% (4th)	15.3% (4th)
2010-12-01	18	11.5% (6th)	11.7% (6th)
2010-12-02	19	12.1% (7th)	12.5% (7th)
2010-12-08	20	12.7% (6th)	12.7% (6th)
Average		13.9%	14.2%

Source: TNS Media Korea

== Awards and nominations ==
Year	Award	Category	Recipient	Result
2010	KBS Drama Awards	Excellence Award, Actor in a Mid-length Drama	Jung Ji-hoon (Rain)	Nominated
2010	KBS Drama Awards	Excellence Award, Actress in a Mid-length Drama	Lee Na-young	Nominated
2010	KBS Drama Awards	Best Supporting Actor	Sung Dong-il	Won

== International broadcast ==
- (Philippines) : TV5, retitled as Runaway.
- Japan: BS Japan, retitled as Tobosha: PLAN B. The series began airing in Japan in April 2011.
- Malaysia: 8TV (Malaysia)
- Thailand: Channel 7, retitled as Seub Sab Zaa...La Krob Suth. The series began airing on September 23, 2013.
- Indonesia: B-Channel, retitled as The Fugitive: Plan B. The series began airing on October 9, 2013.
