= Tube (film) =

- Hangul: 튜브
- RR: Tyubeu
- MR: T'yubŭ
- Directed by: Beak Woon-hak
- Written by: Beak Woon-hak; Byeon Weon-mi; Kim Jeong-min; Kim Min-ju
- Produced by: Lee Chang-woo; Seo Gyeong-seok
- Starring: Kim Suk-hoon; Bae Doona; Park Sang-min
- Cinematography: Yun Hong-shik
- Edited by: Kim Mi-yeong; Park Gok-ji
- Music by: Hwang Sang-jun
- Production companies: Tube Entertainment; Mir Film
- Distributed by: CJ Entertainment
- Release date: June 5, 2003
- Running time: 112 minutes
- Country: South Korea
- Language: Korean
- Budget: $8 million

Tube (Korean: 튜브) is a 2003 South Korean action thriller film directed by Beak Woon-hak (or Baek Woon-hak). The film features police officer Jay (Kim Suk-hoon) who is a subway police officer who spends his days reminiscing over his lost lover. The pickpocket Kay (Bae Doona) becomes infatuated with Jay and tips him off about the government assassin Bishop (Park Sang-min) hijacking a subway car. Both Jay and Kay find themselves in the target car when the Bishop makes his move.

== Plot ==
Detective Jang Do-joon (Kim Suk-hoon) who does not know the meaning of giving up, is hot on the trail of Kang Gi-taek, a deadly terrorist. Kang Gi-taek (Park Sang-min) was an elite secret agent for the government's intelligence agency before getting tossed out for assassinating a key figure.

On the day of the new mayor's official visit to the subway, Kang Gi-taek hijacks the train and begins a full-scale act of terror. Pickpocket girl Song Yin-gyung (Bae Doona), who senses what is going on, quickly contacts Detective Jang Do-joon. The greatest act of terrorism in history, with the lives of 13 million citizens held hostage—the showdown begins between an out-of-control terrorist and a determined detective who is on the verge of life and death.

As the passengers face their deaths, Detective Jang Do-joon disconnects the first car. He has made the decision to sacrifice himself to save the others. His love was only too happy to be rid of the terrorist and it is only after he handcuffs her to the train that she realizes what he is about to do. Detective Jang Do-joon holds onto the controls of the first car and asks her to pull the lever to disconnect the two cars. The heroine must send the most cherished person in her life to fate. She must watch with the survivors in sorrow as the man who gave his life to save theirs, meets his end.

== Cast ==
- Kim Suk-hoon as Jang Do-joon - subway inspector/detective
- Bae Doona as Song Yin-gyung - subway pickpocket
- Park Sang-min as Kang Gi-taek - former leader (rank 'major') of a secret elite squad 'Rhodes Team'
- Son Byong-ho
- Kwon Oh-joong
- Kim Dong-wook
- Bong Tae-gyu as High schooler

== Reception ==
The United States release of Tube was handled by Silver Nitrate Releasings.

Kevin Thomas of the Los Angeles Times wrote that the film "means to compete with razzle-dazzle Hollywood action thrillers, and at least on a technical level succeeds, but elliptical, hard-to-follow plotting compounded by inadequate and banal subtitles flatten the film's thrills" and also that "On visual — and visceral — levels, Tube works like gangbusters." Wade Major of Boxoffice magazine gave the film a rating of three and a half stars out of five, and wrote that and described the film as a "John Woo-style cross between Speed and Die Hard".
