= Son Hyun-joo =

South Korean actor (born 1965)

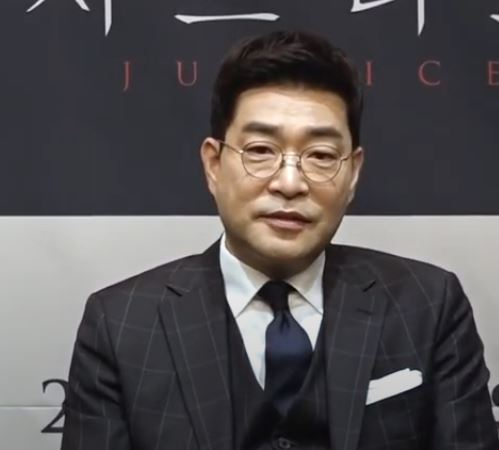
- Son in 2019
- Born: June 24, 1965 (age 61); Gyeongsan, Gyeongsangbuk-do, South Korea
- Education: Chung-Ang University (Graduate School of Advanced Imaging Science, Multimedia & Film)
- Occupation: Actor
- Years active: 1991–present
- Agent: Billions

Korean name
- Hangul: 손현주
- Hanja: 孫賢周
- RR: Son Hyeonju
- MR: Son Hyŏnju
- Website: bladeent.com

Son Hyun-joo (Korean: 손현주; born June 24, 1965) is a South Korean actor. Since 1991, he has starred in numerous television series and films, such as First Love (1996), My Rosy Life (2005), My Too Perfect Sons (2009), Secretly, Greatly (2013), Empire of Gold (2013), The Chronicles of Evil (2015), and The Good Detective (2020–2022).

Most notable in his filmography are two low-profile projects in which he played the leading role, both of which became unexpected hits: critically acclaimed revenge drama The Chaser (2012), and mystery thriller film Hide and Seek (2013). In year 2017, Son won the Best Actor award at the 39th Moscow international film festival for his role in the movie Ordinary Person.

== Filmography ==
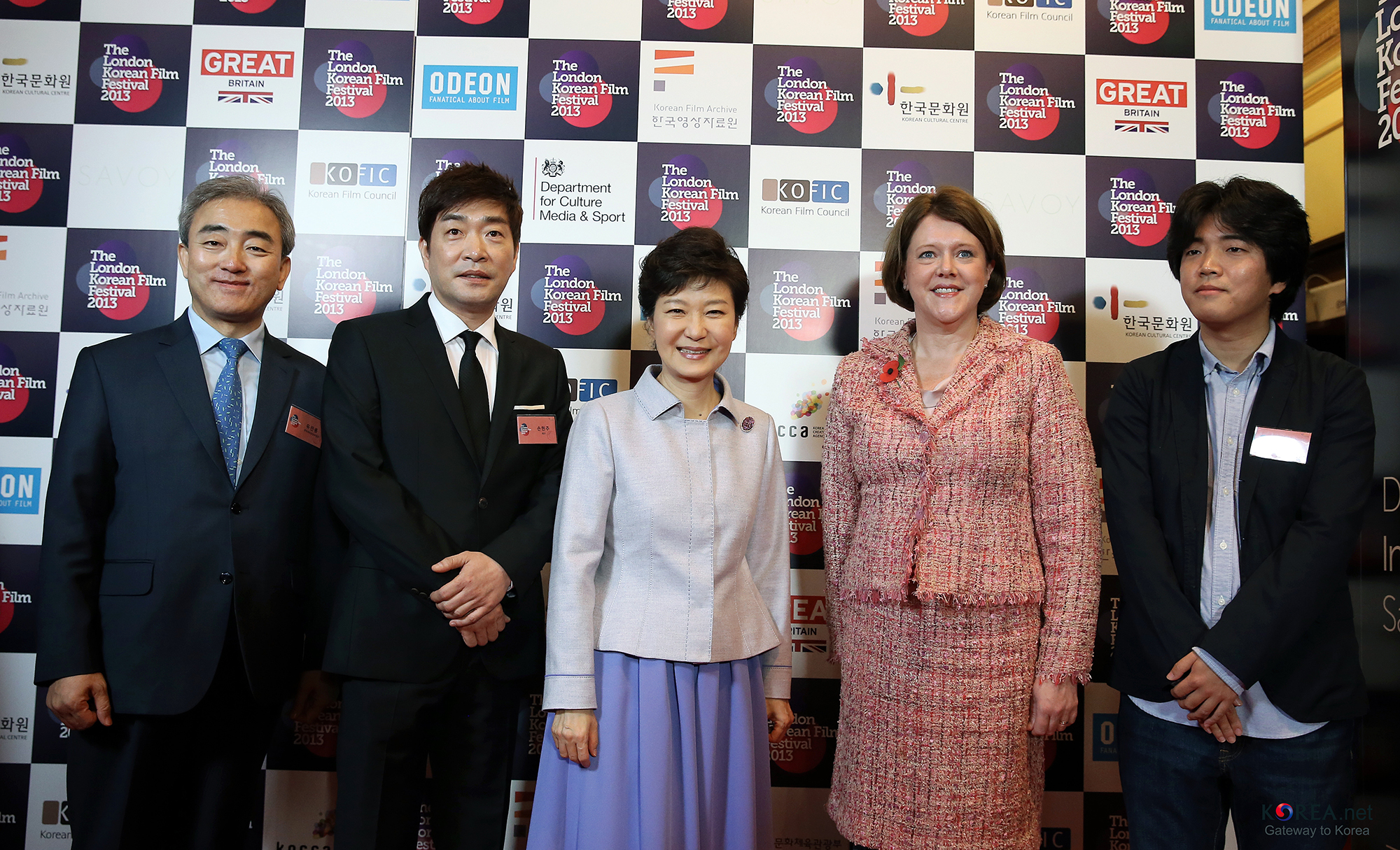
Son (2nd from left) at the 2012 London Korean Film Festival

Key
†	Denotes films that have not yet been released

=== Film ===
Year	Title	Role	Notes	Ref.
1996	Piano Man			
1997	Baby Sale			
1998	The Happenings	Unlucky prisoner		
1999	The Spy			
2001	Guns & Talks	Tak Mun-bae		
2004	Two Guys	Vice chief Im		
2004	Liar	Inspector Park		
2004	Father and Son: The Story of Mencius	Father Pig		
2005	Short Time	Detective Kang Jong-tae		
2006	Now and Forever	Section chief Min		
2007	Punch Lady	Soo-hyun		
2008	The Devil's Game	Min Tae-suk		
2013	Secretly, Greatly	Kim Tae-won		
2013	Hide and Seek	Sung-soo		
2015	The Chronicles of Evil	Choi Chang-sik		
2015	The Phone	Go Dong-ho		
2016	The Hunt	Detective Squad Chief Son		
2017	Ordinary Person	Kang Sun-jin		
2019	Jesters: The Game Changers	Han Myeong-Hoe		
2022	When Spring Comes	Ho-seong		
2022	The Killer: A Girl Who Deserves to Die	Gun seller	Special appearance	
2022	Hansan: Rising Dragon	Won Gyun		

=== Television series ===
Key
†	Denotes television productions that have not yet been released

Year	Title	Role	Notes	Ref.
1994	Salut D'Amour			
1995	Sandglass			
1995	Even If the Wind Blows	Kim Jin-gook		
1996	First Love	Ju Jung-nam		
1998	Love on a Jujube Tree			
1998	Lie			
1999	Happy Together			
1999	Rising Star, Rising Moon			
1999	Sweet Bride			
2000	The Thief's Daughter	Min-gyu		
2000	Pardon	Han Ho-sub		
2001	School 4	Oh Dal-sung		
2001	Rules of Marriage	Hwang Bok-soo		
2002	The Woman	Oh Man-soo		
2002	To Be With You	Choi Min-ki		
2003	Love Letter	Father Peter		
2003	Near to You	Won-joon		
2003	Lady Next Door	Sang-tae		
2004	Terms of Endearment	Noh Kwang-taek		
2004	Passion	Kang Woo-sik		
2005	Single Again			
2005	My Rosy Life	Ban Sung-moon		
2006	What's Up Fox	Park Byung-gak		
2007	H.I.T	Jo Kyu-won		
2007	Several Questions That Make Us Happy	Sun Jae-hyung		
2007	How to Meet a Perfect Neighbor	Yang Duk-gil		
2007	First Wives' Club	Gil Eok		
2008	Tazza	Go Kwang-ryul		
2009	My Too Perfect Sons	Song Jin-poong		
2009	Swallow the Sun			
2009	Temptation of an Angel	Pervert at the sauna	Cameo	
2010	Jejungwon	General	Cameo	
2010	Definitely Neighbors	Kim Sung-jae		
2010	My Sister's March	Park Jong-pyo		
2010	KBS Drama Special: "Texas Hit"	Jae-hoon		
2010	Thank You for Your Smile			
2011	KBS Drama Special: "Special Task Force MSS"	Hwang Joon-sung		
2011	KBS Drama Special: "Perfect Spy"	Sweeper		
2011	KBS Drama Special: "Men Cry"	Nam-soo		
2011	Living in Style	Na Dae-ra		
2012	Take Care of Us, Captain	Dae-young	Cameo	
2012	KBS Drama Special: "True Colors of Kang-chul"	King		
2012	The Chaser	Detective Baek Hong-seok		
2013	Empire of Gold	Choi Min-jae		
2014	Three Days	President Lee Dong-hwi		
2016	Signal	Jang Young Chul	Ep. 7, 11, 14, 16	
2017	Criminal Minds	Kang Ki-hyung		
2019	Justice	Song Woo-yong		
2020	Itaewon Class	Park Seong-yeol	Cameo; Ep. 1–2 & 15	
2020	The Good Detective	Kang Do-chang		
2022	Tracer	In Tae-joon		
2024	Your Honor	Song Pan-ho		
2026	The Wonderfools	Ha Won-do		
2026	Reborn Rookie	Kang Yong-ho / Chairman Kang		
2026	Doctor X: Mafia in White	Bu Seung-gwon		

=== Television shows ===
Year	Title	Role	Notes	Ref.
2021	Son Hyun-joo's Simple Station	MC	with Lim Ji-yeon and Kim Jun-hyun	

== Discography ==
Year	Title	Notes
1997	Ju Jung-nam's First Love Medley	Album
1998	Ju Jung-nam's IMF Medley Best 21	Album

== Accolades ==
=== Awards and nominations ===
Name of the award ceremony, year presented, category, nominee of the award, and the result of the nomination
Award ceremony	Year	Category	Nominee / Work	Result	Ref.
APAN Star Awards	2012	Grand Prize (Daesang)	The Chaser	Won	
APAN Star Awards	2023	Top Excellence Award, Actor in Serial Drama	The Good Detective 2	Nominated	
Baeksang Arts Awards	2006	Best Actor – Television	My Rosy Life	Nominated	
Baeksang Arts Awards	2013	Best Actor – Television	The Chaser	Won	
Baeksang Arts Awards	2014	Best Actor – Film	Hide and Seek	Nominated	
Blue Dragon Film Awards	1998	Best Supporting Actor	The Happenings	Nominated	
Buil Film Awards	2014	Best Actor	Hide and Seek	Nominated	
Grand Bell Awards	2008	Best Supporting Actor	The Devil's Game	Nominated	
Grand Bell Awards	2015	Best Actor	The Chronicles of Evil	Nominated	
KBS Drama Awards	1995	Best New Actor	Even If the Wind Blows	Nominated	
KBS Drama Awards	1996	Best Supporting Actor	First Love	Won	
KBS Drama Awards	1996	Popular Actor Award	First Love	Nominated	
KBS Drama Awards	2002	Best Supporting Actor	To Be with You	Won	
KBS Drama Awards	2005	Best Couple Award	Son Hyun-joo (with Choi Jin-sil); My Rosy Life	Won	
KBS Drama Awards	2005	Excellence Award, Actor	My Rosy Life	Won	
KBS Drama Awards	2009	Grand Prize (Daesang)	My Too Perfect Sons	Nominated	
KBS Drama Awards	2009	Top Excellence Award, Actor	My Too Perfect Sons	Won	
KBS Drama Awards	2009	Excellence Award, Actor in a Serial Drama	My Too Perfect Sons	Nominated	
KBS Drama Awards	2010	Best Actor in a One-Act Drama/Special	Texas Hit	Won	
KBS Drama Awards	2011	Best Actor in a One-Act Drama/Special	Perfect Spy	Nominated	
KBS Drama Awards	2019	Excellence Award, Actor in a Miniseries	Justice	Nominated	
KBS Drama Awards	2019	Netizen Award, Actor	Justice	Nominated	
KBS Drama Awards	2019	Top Excellence Award, Actor	Justice	Nominated	
KBS Drama Awards	2019	Grand Prize (Daesang)	Justice	Nominated	
Korea Broadcasting Awards	2013	Best Actor	The Chaser	Won	
Korea Drama Awards	2012	Grand Prize (Daesang)	The Chaser	Nominated	
Korea Drama Awards	2012	Top Excellence Award, Actor	The Chaser	Nominated	
Korean Film Shining Star Awards	2017	Star Award	Ordinary Person	Won	
MBC Drama Awards	2003	Top Excellence Award, Actor	Lady Next Door	Nominated	
Moscow International Film Festival	2017	Best Actor	Ordinary Person	Won	
SBS Drama Awards	2000	Congeniality Award	Son Hyun-joo	Won	
SBS Drama Awards	2000	Excellence Award, Actor	The Thief's Daughter	Nominated	
SBS Drama Awards	2001	Best Supporting Actor	The Thief's Daughter	Won	
SBS Drama Awards	2005	Best Supporting Actor	Single Again	Nominated	
SBS Drama Awards	2007	Best Supporting Actor in a Drama Special	How to Meet a Perfect Neighbor	Nominated	
SBS Drama Awards	2008	Best Supporting Actor in a Special Planning Drama	Tazza	Won	
SBS Drama Awards	2010	Top Excellence Award, Actor in a Weekend/Daily Drama	Definitely Neighbors	Won	
SBS Drama Awards	2011	Top Excellence Award, Actor in a Weekend/Daily Drama	Living in Style	Nominated	
SBS Drama Awards	2012	Grand Prize (Daesang)	The Chaser	Won	
SBS Drama Awards	2012	Top 10 Stars	The Chaser	Won	
SBS Drama Awards	2012	Top Excellence Award, Actor in a Miniseries	The Chaser	Nominated	
SBS Drama Awards	2014	Excellence Award, Actor in a Miniseries	Three Days	Nominated	
The Korean Film Actors Guild Awards	2015	Top Star Award	The Chronicles of Evil	Won	
Wildflower Film Awards	2023	Best Actor	When Spring Comes	Nominated	

=== Honors ===
Name of country or organization, year given, and name of honor or award
Country or organization	Year	Honor / Award	Ref.
National Tax Service	2011	Presidential Commendation	
South Korea (Note: Honors are given at the Korean Popular Culture and Arts Awards, arranged by the Korea Creative Content Agency and hosted by the Ministry of Culture, Sports and Tourism.)	2010	Citation	
South Korea	2017	Presidential Commendation	

=== Listicles ===
Name of publisher, year listed, name of listicle, and placement
Publisher	Year	Listicle	Placement	Ref.
Korean Film Council	2021	Korean Actors 200 (Note: Introduces 200 actors that best represent the present and future of Korean cinema to the people in the film industry all over the world)	Included	
