= Park Sang-min (actor) =

South Korean actor (born 1970)

- Hangul: 박상민
- Hanja: 朴尙民
- RR: Bak Sangmin
- MR: Pak Sangmin

Park Sang-min (born October 9, 1970) is a South Korean actor. He is best known for Im Kwon-taek's General's Son trilogy and his roles in numerous television dramas such as My Lovely Fool and Giant.

Park has had run-ins with the law: a drunk driving arrest in 2011, and a domestic violence charge in 2012.

== Filmography ==
=== Television series ===
- 2019: Possessed (OCN)
- 2017: Bravo My Life (SBS)
- 2013: The Scandal (MBC)
- 2013: Incarnation of Money (SBS)
- 2012: God of War (MBC)
- 2011: City Hunter (SBS)
- 2011: I Trusted Men (MBC)
- 2010: Giant (SBS)
- 2008: Our Happy Ending (MBC)
- 2008: The Great King, Sejong (KBS)
- 2007: Bad Couple (SBS)
- 2007: By My Side (MBC)
- 2006: My Lovely Fool (SBS)
- 2001: Women's World (SBS)
- 2000: Full of Sun (KBS)
- 2000: Virtue (SBS)
- 2000: Meeting (KBS)
- 1999: Young Sun (SBS)
- 1999: Did We Really Love? (MBC)
- 1996: The Brothers' River (SBS)
- 1995: Our Sunny Days of Youth (KBS2)
- 1994: Love is Blue (SBS)

=== Film ===
- 2009: City of Damnation
- 2003: Tube
- 2002: The Hidden Princess
- 1998: Man's Story
- 1997: Sky Doctor
- 1997: Maria and the Inn
- 1996: Hoodlum Lessons
- 1996: Come to Me
- 1995: 48+1
- 1995: Thief and a Poet
- 1995: Bitter and Sweet
- 1993: No Emergency Exit
- 1992: General's Son III
- 1992: A Woman Who Doesn't Divorce
- 1991: General's Son II
- 1990: General's Son

== Awards ==
- 2013 21st Korean Culture and Entertainment Awards: Top Excellence Award, Actor in Drama (The Scandal)
- 2010 SBS Drama Awards: Producer's Award (Giant)
- 2000 KBS Drama Awards: Excellence Award, Actor (Full of Sun)
- 1995 31st Baeksang Arts Awards: Most Popular Actor in Film (Bitter and Sweet)
- 1991 12th Blue Dragon Film Awards: Popular Star Award (General's Son II)
- 1991 29th Grand Bell Awards: Best New Actor (General's Son)
- 1990 11th Blue Dragon Film Awards: Popular Star Award (General's Son)
- 1990 11th Blue Dragon Film Awards: Best New Actor (General's Son)
