= Natural City =

- Theatrical poster
- Hangul: 내츄럴 시티
- RR: Naechureol siti
- MR: Naech'urŏl sit'i
- Directed by: Min Byeong-cheon
- Written by: Min Byeong-cheon
- Produced by: Lee Dong-jun
- Starring: Yoo Ji-tae; Lee Jae-eun; Seo Lin
- Cinematography: Lee Jun-gyu
- Edited by: Kyung Min-ho
- Music by: Lee Jae-jin
- Distributed by: Tube Entertainment
- Release date: September 5, 2003
- Running time: 113 minutes
- Country: South Korea
- Language: Korean
- Budget: $5.8 million

Natural City (Korean: 내츄럴 시티) is a 2003 South Korean science fiction film, directed by Min Byeong-cheon. It is set in a dystopian future, about a colony world that integrates robots, androids and cyborgs amongst the population.

== Plot ==
Two police officers, R and Noma, hunt down renegade cyborgs. The cyborgs serve a number of duties, ranging from military commandos to "dolls", engineered for companionship. They have a limited 3-year lifespan, although black market technology has been developed to transfer a cyborg's artificial intelligence into the brain of a human host.

This breakthrough compels R into finding Cyon, an orphaned prostitute, who may serve as the host for the mind of his doll Ria. He has fallen deeply in love with his doll and she has only a few days left to live.

Eventually, R must make a decision between leaving the colony with Ria to spend her last days with him on a paradise-like planet or save his friends when a renegade combat cyborg takes over the police headquarters.

== Cast ==
- Yoo Ji-tae as R
- Lee Jae-eun as Cyon
- Seo Lin as Ria
- Jung Eun-pyo as Croy
- Yoon Chan as Noma
- Jung Doo-hong as Cypher
- Ko Ju-hye as Ami

== Reception ==
The film received mixed to positive reviews. Rotten Tomatoes gave at the film 67% positive reviews.
