= Yoon Chan (actor, born 1996) =

South Korean actor

- Born: November 26, 1996 (age 29); South Korea
- Occupation: Actor
- Years active: 2003–present

Korean name
- Hangul: 윤찬
- RR: Yun Chan
- MR: Yun Ch'an

Yoon Chan (born November 26, 1996) is a South Korean actor. He began his career as a child actor.

== Filmography ==
=== Films ===
Year	Title	Role
2003	Live or Die	Lee So-Ryong (young)
2007	Bunt	Kim Joon-Tae
2009	White Night	Min-Jae

=== Television series ===
Year	Title	Role
2004	Ireland	Lee Jae-Bok (young)
2009	Ja Myung Go	Il-Poom (young)
2010	Dong Yi	Crown Prince Lee Yoon
