= Ruler of Your Own World =

South Korean television series

- Also known as: As You Wish
- Written by: In Jung-ok
- Directed by: Park Sung-soo
- Starring: Yang Dong-geun; Lee Na-young; Gong Hyo-jin; Lee Dong-gun
- Country of origin: South Korea
- Original language: Korean
- No. of episodes: 20

Production
- Producer: Jang Keun-soo

Original release
- Network: Munhwa Broadcasting Corporation
- Release: July 3 – September 5, 2002

Ruler of Your Own World (Korean: 네 멋대로 해라; RR: Ne meotdaero haera; lit. Do As You Wish) is a 2002 South Korean television series starring Lee Na-young and Yang Dong-geun. It was written by In Jung-ok and directed by Park Sung-soo.

The series was praised by critics for its realism, strong acting, and refusal to rely on K-drama conventions. While its viewership ratings were considered moderate, the series garnered a fervent fanbase, and the home video release of the series saw record-breaking DVD sales for a South Korean production.

== Synopsis ==
Go Bok-su (Yang Dong-geun) has had a difficult childhood and served time in prison. He has a longtime girlfriend, Song Mi-rae (Gong Hyo-jin) who is a cheerleader of the LG Twins. Jeon Kyung (Lee Na-young), a moody tomboy and a daughter of a rich family, is the keyboardist of an unknown indie rock band.

The lead female vocalist of Kyung's band is diagnosed with a brain injury due to an accident, and her fellow band members try to earn money for the surgical procedure that might save her life. Kyung begs her father, an authoritative hotel owner, but is unable to get the funds. One day Bok-su steals Kyung's wallet which contains the money for the operation.

== Cast ==
- Yang Dong-geun as Go Bok-su
- Lee Na-young as Jeon Kyung
- Gong Hyo-jin as Song Mi-rae
- Lee Dong-gun as Han Dong-jin
- Shin Goo as Go Joong-sup (Bok-su's father)
- Youn Yuh-jung as Jung Yoo-soon (Bok-su's mother)
- Jo Kyung-hwan as Jeon Nak-kwan (Jeon Kyung's father)
- Lee Hye-sook as Kang In-ok (Jeon Kyung's mother)
- Lee Se-chang as Jeon Kang (Jeon Kyung's brother)
- Kim Hye-sun as Jeon Kang's wife
- Kim Myung-kook as Sgt. Park Jung-dal
- Heo In-bum as Ko Boong-yi (Junior)
- Jeon Hye-jin as Song Hyun-ji (Mi-rae's sister)
- Kim Jae-wook as Ki-hong (band member)
- Kim Jae-man as Jung-kook (band member)

== Awards ==
Award ceremony	Year	Category	Nominee	Result	Ref.
Baeksang Arts Award	2003	Best Drama	Ruler of Your Own World	Won	
Baeksang Arts Award	2003	Best Screenplay – Television	In Jung-ok	Won	
Baeksang Arts Award	2003	Best New Actor – Television	Yang Dong-geun	Won	
MBC Drama Awards	2002	Best Actor in a Miniseries	Yang Dong-geun	Won	
MBC Drama Awards	2002	Best Actress in a Miniseries	Lee Na-young	Won	
MBC Drama Awards	2002	Popularity Award – Actress	Gong Hyo-jin	Won	
MBC Drama Awards	2002	Favorite Actor of the Year – Viewers' Choice	Yang Dong-geun	Won	
MBC Drama Awards	2002	Favorite Actor of the Year – Journalists' Choice	Yang Dong-geun	Won	
