= General's Son III =

- Theatrical release poster
- Hangul: 장군의 아들 3
- Hanja: 將軍의 아들 3
- RR: Janggunui adeul 3
- MR: Changgunŭi adŭl 3
- Directed by: Im Kwon-taek
- Written by: Hong Song-yu
- Produced by: Lee Tae-won
- Starring: Park Sang-min; Oh Yeon-soo
- Cinematography: Jung Il-sung
- Edited by: Park Gok-ji; Park Sun-duk
- Music by: Shin Pyong-ha
- Distributed by: Taehung Pictures
- Release date: 11 September 1992
- Running time: 110 minutes
- Country: South Korea
- Languages: Korean; Japanese; Mandarin

General's Son III (Korean: 장군의 아들 3; RR: Janggunui adeul 3), also known as Son of a General III, is a 1992 South Korean crime film directed by Im Kwon-taek. The third film in the General's Son trilogy, and a sequel to the 1991 film General's Son II, it stars Park Sang-min, reprising his role as gangster and later politician Kim Du-han.

== Cast ==
- Park Sang-min as Kim Du-han
- Oh Yeon-soo as Jang Eun-shil
- Lee Il-jae
- Shin Hyun-joon
- Kim Seung-woo
