= General's Son II =

- Theatrical release poster
- Hangul: 장군의 아들 2
- Hanja: 將軍의 아들 2
- RR: Janggunui adeul 2
- MR: Changgunŭi adŭl 2
- Directed by: Im Kwon-taek
- Written by: Hong Song-yu
- Produced by: Lee Tae-won
- Starring: Park Sang-min; Lee Il-jae
- Cinematography: Jung Il-sung
- Edited by: Park Gok-ji; Park Sun-duk
- Music by: Shin Pyong-ha
- Distributed by: Taehung Pictures
- Release date: July 20, 1991
- Running time: 103 minutes
- Country: South Korea
- Languages: Korean; Japanese

General's Son II (Korean: 장군의 아들 2; RR: Janggunui adeul 2), also known as The General's Son II or Son of a General II, is a 1991 South Korean crime film directed by Im Kwon-taek. The second film in Im's General's Son trilogy, it stars Park Sang-min as Kim Du-han, a gangster during the Japanese occupation of Korea.

== Cast ==
- Park Sang-min as Kim Du-han
- Lee Il-jae
- Song Chae-hwan
- Shin Hyun-joon
- Bae Mi-hyang

== Release ==
General's Son II was one of the top 10 highest-grossing films in Seoul in 1992.
