= Lee Seung-gi filmography =

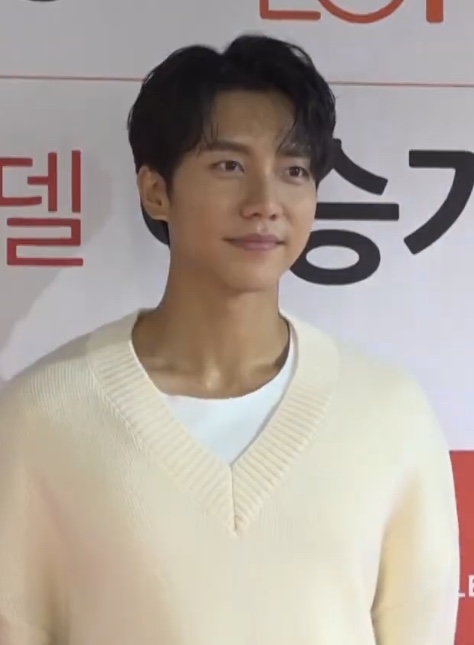
- Leaders fan signing event 2019
- Film: 4
- Television series: 13
- Television show: 24
- Web show: 4
- Hosting: 7
- Music videos: 23
- Narrating: 2

Lee Seung-gi (Korean: 이승기; born January 13, 1987) is a South Korean singer, actor, host and entertainer. He has garnered further recognition as an actor with leading roles in popular dramas such as Brilliant Legacy (2009), My Girlfriend Is a Gumiho (2010), The King 2 Hearts (2012), Gu Family Book (2013), You're All Surrounded (2014), A Korean Odyssey (2017–2018), Vagabond (2019), and Mouse (2021). He was a member of the first season of weekend variety show 1 Night 2 Days from November 2007 to February 2012, and the host of talk show Strong Heart from October 2009 to April 2012.

== Film ==
Year	Title	Role	Notes	Ref.
2015	Love Forecast	Kang Joon-soo		
2018	The Princess and the Matchmaker	Seo Do-yoon		
2023	Ma'am Chief: Shakedown in Seoul		Cameo	
2024	About Family	Ham Moon-seok		

== Television series ==
Year	Title	Role	Notes	Ref.
2004–2005	Nonstop 5	Himself	Episode 1–193	
2006	The Famous Chil Sisters	Hwang Tae-ja		
2009	Brilliant Legacy	Sunwoo Hwan		
2010	My Girlfriend Is a Gumiho	Cha Dae-woong		
2011	The Greatest Love	Himself	Cameo (Episode 9)	
2012	The King 2 Hearts	Lee Jae-ha		
2013	Gu Family Book	Choi Kang-chi		
2014	You're All Surrounded	Eun Dae-gu / Kim Ji-yong		
2015	The Producers	Himself	Cameo (Episode 6)	
2017–2018	A Korean Odyssey	Son Oh-gong		
2019	Vagabond	Cha Dal-gun		
2021	Mouse	Jung Ba-reum		
2022	The Law Cafe	Kim Jung-ho		

== Television shows ==
Year	Title	Role	Notes	Ref.
2004–2006	X-Man	Cast member		
2006	Show! Music Core	MC		
2007	Inkigayo	MC		
2007	SBS 2007 Love Sharing Concert	MC		
2007–2012	1 Night 2 Days	Cast member	Season 1	
2009	Lee Seunggi's Ideal Type World Cup	Cast member		
2009–2012	Strong Heart	MC	with Kang Ho-dong	
2012	The Romantic	Narrator		
2013	Sisters Over Flowers	Cast member	with Kim Hee-ae, Lee Mi-yeon, Youn Yuh-jung, Kim Ja-ok	
2013	Insects, Great Instinct	Narrator		
2015	New Journey to the West	Cast member	Season 1	
2017–2022	Master in the House	Cast member	Episode 1–238	
2018	Produce 48	MC		
2019	Little Forest	Cast member	with Lee Seo-jin, Park Na-rae, Jung So-min	
2020	Hometown Flex	Cast member	with Cha Tae-hyun	
2020	Friday Joy Package	Cast member		
2020–2023	Sing Again	MC	Season 1–3	
2021	Loud	Cast member	Super agent and MC	
2021–2022	Golf Battle: Birdie Buddies	Cast member	Season 1–3	
2022	Circle House	MC	with Han Ga-in, Oh Eun-young, Noh Hong-chul, Leejung Lee	
2023	Peak Time	MC		
2023	Strong Heart League	MC	with Kang Ho-dong	
2023	Brother Ramyeon	Cast member	with Kang Ho-dong and Bae In-hyuk	
2024	King of Survival: Tribal War	Leader Military Team	with Kim Byeong-man, Choo Seong-hoon, Park Tae -hwan, Jeong Ji- hyun, Kim Dong-jun, Kim Dong-hyun, Park Ha-yan, Kang Min - ho, Amotti, Jeong Dae-se, Kim Min-ji	
2024	Starlight Boys	Guider	with Daesung, Choi Young-joon, Hanhae, Kwon Eun-bi, Hui, Eric, Yoon	

== Web shows ==
Year	Title	Role	Notes	Ref.
2019–2021	Busted!	Cast member	Seasons 2–3	
2020	Twogether	Cast member	with Jasper Liu	
2021	New World	Cast member	with Eun Ji-won, Kim Hee-chul, Jo Bo-ah, Park Na-rae, Kai	
2023	Bro & Marble	Cast member	with Yoo Yeon-seok, Lee Dong-hwi, Ji Seok-jin, Kyuhyun, Joshua and Hoshi	

== Hosting ==
Year	Title	Role	Notes	Ref.
2018	32nd Golden Disc Awards	MC (Digital Sound Source part)	with Lee Sung-kyung	
2019	33rd Golden Disc Awards	MC (1st day)	with Park Min-young	
2020	34th Golden Disc Awards	MC (2nd day)	with Park So-dam	
2020	2020 SBS Entertainment Awards	MC	with Shin Dong-yeob and Cha Eun-woo	
2021	35th Golden Disc Awards	MC (1st day)	with Park So-dam	
2021	2021 SBS Entertainment Awards	MC	with Jang Do-yeon and Han Hye-jin	
2022	36th Golden Disc Awards	MC	with Lee Da-hee and Sung Si-kyung	
2024	33rd Seoul Music Awards	MC	with Tiffany Young, BamBam and Young-jae	

== Music videos ==
Year	Title	Starring	Featuring clip
2004	"Because You're My Girl" (내 여자라니까)	Kim Sa-rang	
2004	"Delete" (삭제)		
2006	"Words That Are Hard To Say" (하기 힘든 말)	Nam Sang-mi	
2006	"Shape of Your Lips" (입모양)		
2006	"Please" (제발)	Park Min-ji	
2006	"Desire And Hope" (원하고 원망하죠)	Park Min-ji	
2006	"Addio" (아디오)	Park Min-ji	
2006	"Tears" (눈물)	Park Min-ji	
2007	"White Lie" (착한 거짓말)	Wang Ji-hye	
2007	"Why... Are You Leaving" (왜...가니)	Wang Ji-hye	
2008	"I'll Give You All" (다 줄꺼야)		
2008	"Let's Go on a Vacation" (여행을 떠나요)		"1 Night 2 Days"
2009	"Let's Break Up" (우리 헤어지자)	Lee Se-na	
2010	"Smile Boy (Rock ver.)"	Yuna Kim	
2010	"Losing My Mind" (정신이 나갔었나봐)		"My Girlfriend Is a Nine-Tailed Fox"
2010	"From Now on I Love You" (지금부터 사랑해)		"My Girlfriend Is a Nine-Tailed Fox"
2011	"Aren't We Friends" (친구잖아)		
2012	"Time for Love" (恋愛時代)	Park Shin-hye	
2012	"Aren't We Friends" (チングジャナ -友達だから-)	Park Shin-hye, Joo Sang-wook	
2012	"Return" (되돌리다)	Park Gun-tae, Kim You-jung	
2012	"An Invitation For Me" (나에게 초대)		
2012	"Forest" (숲)		
2013	"Last Word" (마지막 그 한마디)		"Gu Family Book"
2015	"And Goodbye" (그리고 안녕)		
2016	"Meet Someone Like Me" (그런 사람)		
2020	"The Ordinary Man" (뻔한남자)		
2020	"I Will" (잘할게)	Park Gyu-young	
