= List of awards and nominations received by Lee Seung-gi =

Lee Seung-gi awards and nominations
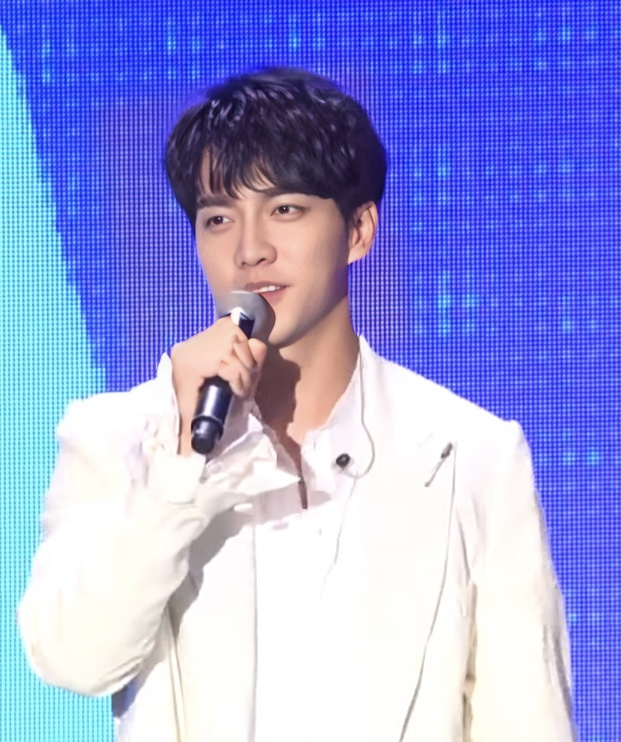
- Lee at the 2019 Taiwan Fanmeet
Awards and nominations
Award	Wins	Nominations
APAN Star Awards	0	2
Asia Artist Awards	4	4
Asia Rainbow TV Awards	1	1
Asia Song Festival	1	1
Baeksang Arts Awards	2	4
Brand Customer Loyalty Award	1	1
Brand of the Year Awards	1	1
Gaon Chart K-Pop Awards	2	2
Golden Disc Awards	3	3
KBS Drama Awards	2	4
KBS Entertainment Awards	3	3
Korea Advertiser Awards	2	2
Korea Best Dresser Awards	1	1
Korea Drama Awards	0	2
Korea Entertainment Arts Awards	1	1
Korea PD Awards	1	1
Korean Film Actors' Guild Awards	1	1
MBC Best 10 Singers Music Festival	1	1
MBC Drama Awards	3	5
MBC Entertainment Awards	1	1
MelOn Music Awards	2	2
Mnet 20's Choice Awards	1	3
Mnet Asian Music Awards	4	4
SBS Drama Awards	8	13
SBS Entertainment Awards	12	16
SBS Music Awards	2	2
Seoul International Drama Awards	1	2
Seoul Music Awards	5	5

Totals (Note: Certain award groups do not simply award one winner. They acknowledge several different recipients, have runners-up, and have third place. Since this is a specific recognition and is different from losing an award, runner-up mentions are considered wins in this award tally. For simplification and to avoid errors, each award in this list has been presumed to have had a prior nomination.)
- Wins: 66
- Nominations: 88

This is a list of awards and nominations received by South Korean singer, actor, host, and entertainer Lee Seung-gi.

== Awards and nominations ==
=== Music awards ===
Name of the award ceremony, year presented, category, nominee of the award, and the result of the nomination
Award ceremony	Year	Category	Nominee / Work	Result	Ref.
Asia Song Festival	2011	Korea's Representative Best Singer of Asia Award	Lee Seung-gi	Won	
Brand Customer Loyalty Awards	2021	Best Male vocal	Lee Seung-gi	Won	
Gaon Chart K-Pop Awards	2012	Song of the Month (October 2011)	"Time for Love"	Won	
Gaon Chart K-Pop Awards	2013	Song of the Month (December 2012)	"Return"	Won	
Golden Disc Awards	2009	Digital Bonsang	"Will You Marry Me"	Won	
Golden Disc Awards	2010	Digital Bonsang	"Love Taught Me To Drink"	Won	
Golden Disc Awards	2021	Best Ballad Award	Lee Seung-gi	Won	
Korea Best Dresser Awards	2006	Singer Award	Lee Seung-gi	Won	
Korea Entertainment Arts Awards	2008	Best Male Singer (Ballad)	Lee Seung-gi	Won	
MBC Best 10 Singers Music Festival	2004	Best Newcomer	"Because You're My Girl"	Won	
MBC Entertainment Awards	2004	Special Singer Award	"Because You're My Girl"	Won	
Melon Music Awards	2010	Top 10 Artists Award	"Losing My Mind"	Won	
Melon Music Awards	2010	Special OST My Girlfriend Is a Nine-Tailed Fox Award	"Losing My Mind"	Won	
Mnet Asian Music Awards	2004	Best New Male Artist	"Because You're My Girl"	Won	
Mnet Asian Music Awards	2006	Best Ballad Performance	"Words That Are Hard To Say"	Won	
Mnet Asian Music Awards	2007	Best Male Artist	"White Lie"	Won	
Mnet Asian Music Awards	2013	Best Vocal Performance – Male	"Return"	Won	
SBS Music Awards	2004	Best Newcomer Awards	"Because You're My Girl"	Won	
SBS Music Awards	2005	Bonsang Award	"Words That Are Hard To Say"	Won	
Seoul Music Awards	2004	Best Newcomer	"Because You're My Girl"	Won	
Seoul Music Awards	2012	Popularity Award	"Aren't We Friends"	Won	
Seoul Music Awards	2012	Bonsang Award	"Aren't We Friends"	Won	
Seoul Music Awards	2013	Popularity Award	"Return"	Won	
Seoul Music Awards	2013	Bonsang Award	"Return"	Won	

=== Film and television awards ===
Name of the award ceremony, year presented, category, nominee of the award, and the result of the nomination
Award ceremony	Year	Category	Nominee / Work	Result	Ref.
APAN Star Awards	2013	Excellence Award, actor	Gu Family Book	Nominated	
APAN Star Awards	2021	Popular Star Award, Actor	Vagabond	Nominated	
Asia Artist Awards	2017	Best Welcome Award	Lee Seung-gi	Won	
Asia Artist Awards	2018	Artist of the Year	Lee Seung-gi	Won	
Asia Artist Awards	2018	Best Popular	Lee Seung-gi	Won	
Asia Artist Awards	2021	Grand Prize (Daesang) (TV category)	Mouse	Won	
Asia Rainbow TV Awards	2014	Outstanding Leading Actor	Gu Family Book	Won	
Baeksang Arts Awards	2010	Best New Actor – Television	Brilliant Legacy	Nominated	
Baeksang Arts Awards	2010	Most Popular Actor	Brilliant Legacy	Won	
Baeksang Arts Awards	2014	Most Popular Actor	Gu Family Book	Nominated	
Baeksang Arts Awards	2021	Best Male Variety Performer	Master in the House, Sing Again, Busted!	Won	
Brand of the Year Awards	2020	Male Multi-entertainer of the Year Award	Lee Seung-gi	Won	
KBS Drama Awards	2022	Grand Award (Daesang)	The Law Cafe	Won	
KBS Drama Awards	2022	Top Excellence Award, Actor	The Law Cafe	Nominated	
KBS Drama Awards	2022	Excellence Award, Actor in a Miniseries	The Law Cafe	Nominated	
KBS Drama Awards	2022	Best Couple Award (with Lee Se-young)	The Law Cafe	Won	
KBS Entertainment Awards	2008	Popularity Award	1 Night 2 Days	Won	
KBS Entertainment Awards	2010	Top Excellence MC Award (Show/Entertainment Division)	1 Night 2 Days	Won	
KBS Entertainment Awards	2011	Grand Award (Daesang) (with 1 Night 2 Days team)	1 Night 2 Days	Won	
Korea Advertiser Awards	2009	Model of the Year	Lee Seung-gi	Won	
Korea Advertiser Awards	2010	Model of the Year	Lee Seung-gi	Won	
Korea Drama Awards	2013	Top Excellence Award, actor	Gu Family Book	Nominated	
Korea Drama Awards	2014	Top Excellence Award, actor	You're All Surrounded	Nominated	
Korea PD Awards	2023	Best Actor Award	The Law Cafe	Won	
Korean Film Actors' Guild Awards	2015	Popularity Award	Love Forecast	Won	
MBC Drama Awards	2012	Top Excellence Award, Actor in a Miniseries	The King 2 Hearts	Nominated	
MBC Drama Awards	2012	Best Couple Award (with Ha Ji-won)	The King 2 Hearts	Nominated	
MBC Drama Awards	2013	Top Excellence Award, Actor in a Miniseries	Gu Family Book	Won	
MBC Drama Awards	2013	Popularity Award	Gu Family Book	Won	
MBC Drama Awards	2013	Best Couple Award (with Suzy)	Gu Family Book	Won	
Mnet 20's Choice Awards	2009	Hot Male Drama Star	Brilliant Legacy	Won	
Mnet 20's Choice Awards	2012	20's Drama Actor	The King 2 Hearts	Nominated	
Mnet 20's Choice Awards	2013	20's Drama Star – Male	Gu Family Book	Nominated	
SBS Drama Awards	2009	Excellence in Acting (Special Planning Drama)	Brilliant Legacy	Won	
SBS Drama Awards	2009	Top 10 Stars Award	Brilliant Legacy	Won	
SBS Drama Awards	2009	Best Couple Award (with Han Hyo-joo)	Brilliant Legacy	Won	
SBS Drama Awards	2010	Excellence in Acting (Drama Special)	My Girlfriend Is a Nine-Tailed Fox	Won	
SBS Drama Awards	2010	Top 10 Stars Award	My Girlfriend Is a Nine-Tailed Fox	Won	
SBS Drama Awards	2010	Best Couple (with Shin Min-a)	My Girlfriend Is a Nine-Tailed Fox	Won	
SBS Drama Awards	2014	Top Excellence Award, Actor in a Drama Special	You're All Surrounded	Nominated	
SBS Drama Awards	2014	Netizen Popularity Award	You're All Surrounded	Nominated	
SBS Drama Awards	2014	Best Couple Award (with Go Ara)	You're All Surrounded	Nominated	
SBS Drama Awards	2019	Grand Prize (Daesang)	Vagabond	Nominated	
SBS Drama Awards	2019	Producer Award	Vagabond	Nominated	
SBS Drama Awards	2019	Top Excellence Award in a Miniseries (Male)	Vagabond	Won	
SBS Drama Awards	2019	Best Couple (with Bae Suzy)	Vagabond	Won	
SBS Entertainment Awards	2009	Netizens' Popularity Award	Strong Heart	Won	
SBS Entertainment Awards	2010	Netizens' Popularity Award	Strong Heart	Won	
SBS Entertainment Awards	2010	Top Excellence MC Award	Strong Heart	Won	
SBS Entertainment Awards	2010	Grand Award (Daesang)	Strong Heart	Nominated	
SBS Entertainment Awards	2011	Netizens' Popularity Award	Strong Heart	Won	
SBS Entertainment Awards	2011	Top Excellence MC Award (Talk Show Division)	Strong Heart	Won	
SBS Entertainment Awards	2011	Grand Award (Daesang)	Strong Heart	Nominated	
SBS Entertainment Awards	2018	Grand Award (Daesang)	Master in the House	Won	
SBS Entertainment Awards	2019	Grand Award (Daesang)	Master in the House	Nominated	
SBS Entertainment Awards	2019	Best Teamwork Award	Master in the House	Won	
SBS Entertainment Awards	2019	Producer's Award	Master in the House, Little Forest	Won	
SBS Entertainment Awards	2020	Grand Prize (Daesang)	Master in the House	Nominated	
SBS Entertainment Awards	2020	Hot Star Award – OTT Content Category	Master in the House	Won	
SBS Entertainment Awards	2021	Entertainer of the Year Award	Master in the House, Loud, Golf Battle: Birdie Buddies	Won	
SBS Entertainment Awards	2021	Best Teamwork Award	Master in the House	Won	
SBS Entertainment Awards	2021	Producer's Award	Master in the House, Loud	Won	
Seoul International Drama Awards	2010	People's Choice Popular Actor	Brilliant Legacy	Won	
Seoul International Drama Awards	2012	Outstanding Korean Actor	The King 2 Hearts	Nominated	

== Other accolades ==
=== State and cultural honors ===
Name of country or organization, year given, and name of honor or award
Country or organization	Year	Honor/Award	Ref.
48th Korea Savings' Day	2011	Presidential Commendation	
Korea Sharing Volunteer Awards	2018	Humanitarian and Voluntary Services Award	
Korean Ministry of Culture, Sports and Tourism	2010	Hallyu Merit Award	
Korean Popular Culture and Arts Awards	2014	Minister of Culture, Sports and Tourism Commendation	
Korean Red Cross	2023	Highest Honorary Captain Commendation Award	
National Tax Service	2022	Presidential Commendation	

=== Listicles ===
Name of publisher, year listed, name of listicle, and placement
Publisher	Year	List	Rank	Ref.
Forbes	2010	Korea Power Celebrity 40	7th	
Forbes	2011	Korea Power Celebrity 40	4th	
Forbes	2012	Korea Power Celebrity 40	6th	
Forbes	2013	Korea Power Celebrity 40	11th	
Forbes	2014	Korea Power Celebrity 40	14th	
Forbes	2015	Korea Power Celebrity 40	6th	
Forbes	2018	Korea Power Celebrity 40	33rd	
Forbes	2019	Korea Power Celebrity 40	25th	
Forbes	2020	Korea Power Celebrity 40	21st	
Forbes	2021	Korea Power Celebrity 40	30th	
Forbes	2022	Korea Power Celebrity 40	6th	
Forbes	2023	Korea Power Celebrity 40	15th	
Forbes	2024	Korea Power Celebrity 40	27th	
