= Twogether (TV program) =

- Promotional poster
- Genre: Travel documentary
- Created by: Cho Hyo-jin; Chang Hyuk-jae; Go Min-seok
- Starring: Lee Seung-gi; Jasper Liu
- Country of origin: South Korea; Taiwan
- Original languages: Korean; Mandarin
- No. of seasons: 1
- No. of episodes: 8

Production
- Producer: Jang Hyuk-jae
- Production locations: Indonesia; Thailand; Nepal
- Running time: 55–83 minutes
- Production company: Company SangSang

Original release
- Network: Netflix
- Release: June 26, 2020

Twogether is a South Korean-Taiwanese travel documentary television series starring Lee Seung-gi and Jasper Liu. It was released by Netflix on June 26, 2020.

== Synopsis ==
Actors Lee Seung-gi and Jasper Liu travel to six Asian cities (Yogyakarta and Bali in Indonesia, Bangkok and Chiang Mai in Thailand, Pokhara and Kathmandu in Nepal) where they must complete missions together, even though they do not speak each other's language, in order to meet their fans who recommended the locations they visited.

== Cast ==
- Lee Seung-gi
- Jasper Liu

== Episodes ==
No.	Title	Original release date
1	"Episode 1"	June 26, 2020
Lee Seung-gi and Jasper Liu meet in Yogyakarta and find their accommodation. They are told that they must complete missions in places that were suggested by their fans in order to meet them. The following day, they are given their first mission: find a lamp in Jomblang Cave. They succeed, find clues inside the lamp and head to another cave in Kalisuci. At a fishing spot inside the cave, they can ask a question about the next clue every time they catch a fish. After Jasper catches a fish, Seung-gi finds the next clue. Back to their car and on their way to the next place, Seung-gi seems to discover how to use the two clues they found.
2	"Episode 2"	June 26, 2020
Seung-gi figures out a way to narrow down the cities where their fan lives. They take a tour of Prambanan Temple Compounds and are given their third mission: solve a quiz while playing a spinning top game. While Seung-gi makes the tops spin, Jasper goes back to the Temple and take a picture which answers the question given to them. They can only succeed if Jasper comes back before the tops stop spinning; they succeed the third time and head to Alun-Alun. Their final mission in Yogyakarta is to find two locals holding a badminton racket, play a match against them and win; they succeed at the second game. They meet their fan and make it to the airport before the allocated time. They fly to Bali and win a Golden Key which will help them later. In Nusa Dua, they are given their first mission to meet their second fan.
3	"Episode 3"	June 26, 2020
Jasper goes harpoon fishing while Seung-gi fishes on board of a boat; they can succeed if the total length of the fish they catch is at least 50-centimeter long (however they must release all fish smaller than 10 centimeters). Unable to fulfill their mission, they use their Golden Key and a mercenary catches fish for them. At Sawangan beach, Seung-gi goes paragliding while Jasper draws words given to him on the sand. Seung-gi recognizes five drawings; they succeed. They go to Garuda Park where they must find at least one of the Korean words hidden in the Kecak performance; they succeed when recognizing the word "iced tea." At Canggu, they must complete couple poses during a yoga class without doing the forbidden acts. They succeed, get the last clue and find their fan's home.
4	"Episode 4"	June 26, 2020
After meeting their fan, they fly to Bangkok. At a restaurant on Ram Buttri Road, they play diverse games with tourists and get the first clue to meet their third fan. They then go to the Artbox night market and play an axe throwing game with the club owner. They win and are giving the chance to gain another Golden Key if the owner is satisfied with the duo's busking performance of the show's theme song.
5	"Episode 5"	June 26, 2020
They win a Golden Key and use it the following day to get a chauffeur who drives them to Damnoen Saduak Floating Market. There, the play rock-paper-scissors with the merchants who have their dolls. They must win X times in a row according to the X number they draw; each good answer can be exchanged for a clue. If they lose, they must buy products from the merchants. They win two times, get two clues and decide to skip the last destination as they think they have enough clues to find their fan's address. After walking around her neighborhood for an hour, they eventually find their fan's house. They then fly to Chiang Mai where a competition between the two starts and only the winner will get to meet the fan. At the Hang Dong Canyon, after competing during a water bicycle game, Jasper must dive from a 8-meter height and Seung-gi from a 15-meter height.
6	"Episode 6"	June 26, 2020
After jumping into the water, Seung-gi drives to Chiang Mai University, closely followed by Jasper. The latter eventually arrives first at the destination as Seung-gi takes more time during his lunch break. There, they must each find three university students to play a simpler version sepak takraw with, and compete against each other. Seung-gi's team wins, he thus gets to choose first one of the two destinations where they will each make presents for the fan. Seung-gi chooses the cooking class, Jasper is left with the art class. Seung-gi gets to his fan's home first while Jasper is escorted to the airport. They each go home and meet at Tribhuvan International Airport one week later. There, they are told that they might not be able to go to Pokhara due to the heavy rain form the wet season.
7	"Episode 7"	June 26, 2020
After multiple delays, they are finally able to board the plane and land in Pokhara. At their new accommodation, Seung-gi cooks for Jasper. The following day, their first mission is to go trekking in Dhampus and take a picture of the Annapurna Massif from the observatory. They succeed despite the cloudy weather. At Phewa Lake, they row a boat to Tal Barahi Temple. There, they play a simpler version of carrom with locals and win, thus getting a new clue. At the airport, they are waiting for their delayed flight to Kathmandu when a siren starts wailing.
8	"Episode 8"	June 26, 2020
After the airport car chases birds away, the siren stops and the duo boards their plane to Kathmandu. In Bhaktapur, they must find pictures held by four citizens in the area and say the word bhetiyo which means "found it" in Nepali. They find out that the syllables at the back of the pictures form the word "Annapurna" and find the painting which is seen on the pictures. After getting their clue, they head to Dilli Bazaar. At the Bhojan Griha restaurant, they must say the order in which their dal bhat dishes were served; they win during their last attempt. They meet their fifth fan and fly to Seoul. There, they board a water taxi at Hangang Park and must find clues in each station they stop at within the allocated time. They find their sixth fan before sharing a meal with all of them.

== Production ==
=== Development ===
On June 24, 2019, South Korean news media Osen reported that Lee Seung-gi and Jasper Liu would film a variety show where they would travel around the world together to meet their fans. Lee Seung-gi's agency confirmed that the two actors were planning on starring in the show but denied that Netflix would release the program, which the streaming platform also denied. On September 9, 2019, a week after filming began, Netflix announced through a press release that Twogether would be available for streaming exclusively on its platform.

The show is produced by Company SangSang which is also behind the production of Netflix's game show Busted!.

=== Filming ===
Filming began on September 2, 2019 in Indonesia and ended in the fall in Seoul.

== Release ==
On June 8, 2020, the main poster for the show was released along with the announcement that Twogether would premiere on June 26. The first trailer was released on June 11, the second one was released on June 23.

== Critical reception ==
Joel Keller of Decider said that "Twogether is a pleasant diversion that has great scenery and two ingratiating young stars. Whether you read the subtitles or not, you'll wish you were on the adventures Jasper and Seung-gi are on."
