= Lee Seung-gi =

South Korean singer and actor (born 1987)

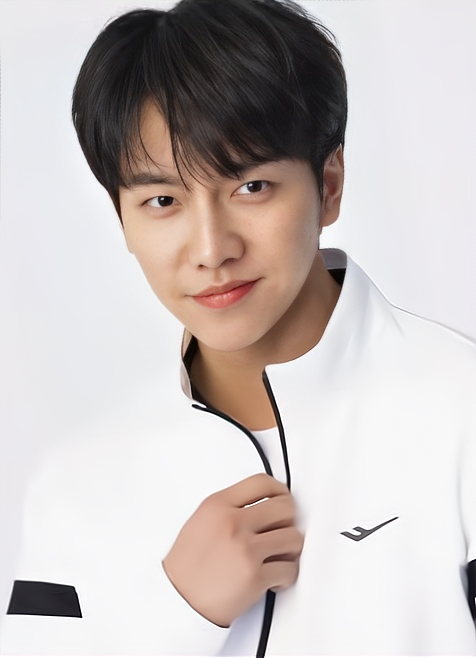
- Lee in 2022
- Born: January 13, 1987 (age 39); Dobong District, Seoul, South Korea
- Education: Dongguk University
- Occupations: Singer; actor; host; entertainer
- Years active: 2004–present
- Agents: HumanMade; BPM
- Works: Full list
- Spouse: Lee Da-in (m. 2023)
- Children: 2
- Awards: Full list
- Honours: Ministry of Culture, Sports and Tourism Commendation for Korean Popular Culture and Arts Awards (2014); Presidential Commendation for National Tax Service (2022)
- Musical career
- Genres: K-pop; ballad
- Instrument: Vocals
- Labels: Hook Entertainment; HumanMade; BPM
- Website: leeseunggi.co.kr

Korean name
- Hangul: 이승기
- Hanja: 李昇基
- RR: I Seunggi
- MR: I Sŭnggi

Lee Seung-gi (Korean: 이승기; Hanja: 李昇基; born January 13, 1987) is a South Korean singer, actor, host, lyricist and entertainer. As one of the highest paid celebrities of South Korea and recipient of numerous awards and accolades, including a Golden Disc Award for music and Baeksang Arts Award for acting, Lee has been featured multiple times in Forbes Korea Power Celebrity 40 list since 2010, and recently ranked sixth in 2022. His success as a singer, actor and host has earned him the title of "Triple Threat" entertainer and has established him as a top Hallyu star.

He has numerous hit songs as a singer such as "Because You're My Woman", "Will You Marry Me", "Return" and "The Ordinary Man". He has garnered further recognition as an actor and rose to popularity in parts of Asia with leading roles in popular dramas such as Brilliant Legacy (2009), My Girlfriend Is a Gumiho (2010), The King 2 Hearts (2012), Gu Family Book (2013), You're All Surrounded (2014), A Korean Odyssey (2017–2018), Vagabond (2019), Mouse (2021), and The Law Cafe (2022). He was a member of the first season of weekend variety show 1 Night 2 Days from November 2007 to February 2012, and the host of talk show Strong Heart from October 2009 to April 2012.

Lee was first included in Forbes Korea Power Celebrity 40 list in 2010 placing seventh, subsequently ranking fourth in 2011 and sixth in 2012, 2015 and 2022.

In 2021, Lee was selected as one of the 200 actors (100 males and 100 females) to be featured in the Korean Actors 200 Campaign, run by the Korean Film Council (KOFIC). This methodical project's aim is to select actors that best represent the present and future of Korean film and to introduce them to other people that work in the film industry overseas.

== Early life and education ==
Lee Seung-gi was born on January 13, 1987, in Banghak-dong, Dobong District, South Korea. His family consists of his parents and younger sister. During his elementary and middle school days, Lee was considered a good student, he was an all rounder and performed equally well in sports, academics and arts and was the elected president of the student council throughout his school years. In school, he became well-versed in English, Japanese and Korean. Lee was also part of a band in his local high school, where he was the lead vocalist. Their band name was initially called Brain Hemorrhage to give a strong impression, but it was later changed to Natural. During his band's last activity, he was scouted by singer Lee Sun-hee when she saw him perform in a small theater. Although Lee initially rejected the offer to concentrate on his studies, he later accepted it after his mother's persuasion as Lee Sun-hee was her favorite singer. He trained for 2 years before making his singing debut at the age of 17.

While busy in his career, Lee graduated from Dongguk University obtaining his degree in International Trade and Commerce on February 20, 2009, and received a special achievement award during graduation. He then continued his studies obtaining two master's degrees, Marketing, Trade Theory as well as Finance and Cultural Contents at Dongguk Graduate School. He successfully received Child Psychiatry Counselling Certificate while he was doing Little Forest variety show.

== Career ==
=== 2004–present: As singer ===
Scouted by singer Lee Sun-hee, Lee trained for two years before debuting on June 5, 2004, at the age of 17. "Because You're My Girl", his debut song from his first album The Dream of a Moth, became a popular ballad which created a 'liking older women' syndrome in South Korea. With this song, he won the Best Newcomer award in various music awards ceremonies in 2004, such as the M.net KM Music Festival and Seoul Music Awards. In 2007, he also won the Best Male Solo Artist award at the M.net KM Music Festival with his song "White Lie" from his third album Story of Separation.

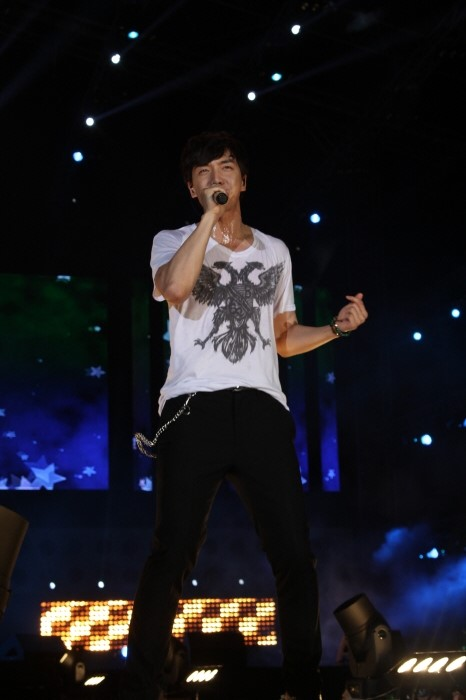
At Yeosu Expo Pop Festival, 2012

He released a digital single titled "Will You Marry Me" in 2009, which became a hit in South Korea. With this single, he received the Digital Single Bonsang award in the 24th Golden Disc Awards. The same year, he released his fourth album Shadow, which was a success and received 40,000 pre-order copies before its release.

In 2010, he recorded a duet version of his 2007 song "Smile Boy" with South Korean figure skater Kim Yuna, which became the official 2010 FIFA World Cup commercial song in South Korea. He also received the Digital Single Bonsang award for the second consecutive time at the 25th Golden Disc Awards with his song "Love Taught Me To Drink". This was followed by the release of his fifth album, Tonight in 2011, a departure from his usual traditional ballads and encompasses more of a rock band-style sound and melodies. The title song "Aren't We Friends" instantly topped online music charts upon release. His other single, "Era of Love" also earned the No. 1 spot on that week's Billboard K-Pop Hot 100.

On March 6, 2012, Lee made his debut in Japan with the release of his first Japanese album Time for Love (also translated as Alone in Love) and a single of the same title. Both the album and single ranked number one on the Oricon Daily Chart. He held a concert at Nippon Budokan, Tokyo, on June 1, 2012, three months after his debut. Back in South Korea the same year, he released an EP titled Forest. The title song "Return" set a record for being number one for six consecutive weeks on Billboard's Korea K-Pop Hot 100. On June 10, 2015, he made his music comeback with his sixth album And... after a hiatus of two years and seven months. On January 21, 2016, his agency, Hook Entertainment, announced that he would be enlisting for his mandatory military service on February 1. As a gift to fans, he also released a new track on January 21 at noon, titled "I Am Going to the Military". On March 3, 2016, his song "Meet Someone Like Me" was released. The single is the last song he recorded before joining the army, and was produced by Psy.

On November 15, 2020, he released a pre-released track titled "The Ordinary Man" (뻔한 남자), ahead of his anticipated seventh album The Project, which was released on December 10, 2020. On June 21, 2022, his agency announced that Lee will be partnering with guitarist Lee Byung-ho from Captain Planet's songwriting team to release the project's theme song on July 1.

=== 2004–present: As actor with pan-Asian fame ===
In 2004, Lee starred in MBC's sitcom Nonstop 5. He then officially debuted as an actor in KBS's 2006 weekend drama The Infamous Chil Sisters. He was then cast as the male lead in SBS's weekend drama Brilliant Legacy in 2009, co-starring Han Hyo-joo. The drama maintained its top spot in viewer ratings throughout its run, with its final episode attaining a viewer rating of 47.1%. The huge success boosted Lee's popularity as an actor and led to increased advertising offers for the actor. For his performance in the drama, he received the "Excellence in Acting" award, the "Top 10 Stars" award and the "Best Couple" award with Han Hyo-joo at the 2009 SBS Drama Awards.

This was followed by SBS's fantasy drama My Girlfriend Is a Nine-Tailed Fox in 2010, playing a university student who (despite strong discouragement from his grandfather) wants to drop out in order to pursue his dream of becoming an action movie star. His performance earned him his second "Excellence in Acting" award at the 2010 SBS Drama Awards. He then starred in MBC's action drama The King 2 Hearts (2012) with Ha Ji-won, fantasy-historical drama Gu Family Book (2013) with Bae Suzy, and SBS's police drama You're All Surrounded (2014). In 2015, Lee Seun-gi made his film debut with romantic comedy Love Forecast which co-stars Moon Chae-won. In July 2015, Lee was cast in the period comedy film The Princess and the Matchmaker with Shim Eun-kyung, directed by The Face Reader director Han Jae-rim. The film was released in 2018.

In 2017, he was the lead actor in the fantasy drama A Korean Odyssey, written by the Hong sisters. This marked his first project after enlistment. In 2019, he and Bae Suzy starred in the spy action drama Vagabond as their second drama together. With this drama, he received the Top Excellence Award in a Miniseries and the "Best Couple" award with Bae Suzy at the 2019 SBS Drama Awards. In 2021, Lee starred alongside Lee Hee-joon in the crime thriller Mouse, playing the role of Jeong Ba-reum, which earned him the Grand Award (Daesang) for best actor in TV category at the 6th Asia Artist Awards. On April 7, 2022, Lee was confirmed to appear in a KBS drama alongside Lee Se-young titled The Law Cafe, it is a healing romance drama about a former prosecutor now landlord and a former Miss Korea now lawyer, based on a popular web novel.

=== 2007–present: As host and entertainer ===
Lee was a permanent cast member of the first season of 1 Night 2 Days, a segment of KBS's weekend variety show Happy Sunday, from November 2007 to February 2012. Known by his nickname heodang, his appearance on the show shot him to fame in Korea and made him a household name. In 2008, he received the Best Popularity award in the KBS Entertainment Awards due to his popularity with audience in 1 Night 2 Days. He also earned the Top Excellence Host award in the 2010 KBS Entertainment Awards and the Daesang award with the other cast members of the first season at the 2011 KBS Entertainment Awards.

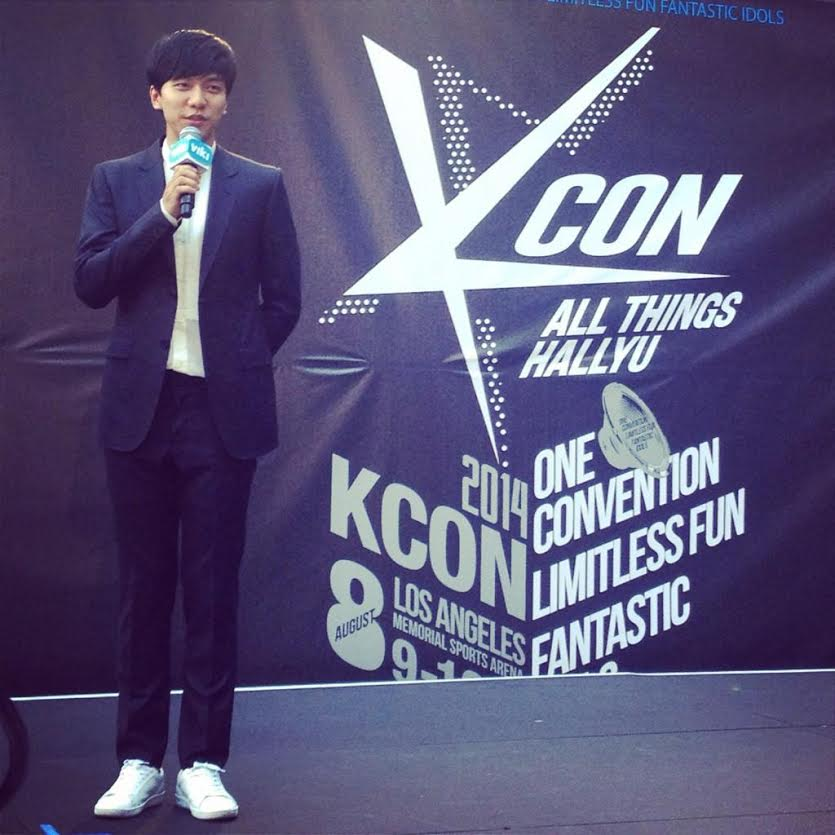
At KCON, 2014

In October 2009, Lee took on a hosting role in SBS's Tuesday night talk show Strong Heart with Kang Ho-dong. It was recognized as the Best Program at the 2009 SBS Entertainment Awards and he was awarded the Netizens' Popularity award. He was again recognized for his role in the talk show and received the Top Excellence Host award for two consecutive years at the 2010 and 2011 SBS Entertainment Awards. In March 2012, Lee announced his departure from Strong Heart in order to focus on his singing career. He recorded his last episode on March 15, which was broadcast on April 3. Lee reunited with 1 Night 2 Days cast members and PD Na Young-seok in the travel-reality show New Journey to the West in 2015. In 2017, he joined the cast of SBS variety show Master in the House.

In 2018, he was chosen to be the MC of Mnet's reality/survival program, Produce 48. The same year, it was announced that he will join the second season of Netflix's variety show Busted!. At 2018 SBS Entertainment Awards, he won the Grand Prize (Daesang) for Master in the House, becoming the youngest entertainer to receive the award. In 2019, he joined the cast of Little Forest – a healing variety program designed as a home kids garden development project for children. The same year, he featured in the Netflix travel show Twogether alongside Taiwanese actor Jasper Liu. In 2020, he hosted Friday Joy Package, Hometown Flex and a singing reality show Sing Again.

In 2021, he rejoined the cast of Netflix's variety show Busted! for a third season and also joined the SBS golf entertainment show Golf Battle: Birdie Buddies. On July 24, Lee joined the reality program Loud as an MC and Special Agent, a unique position whose task is to provide the remaining contestants with warmth, guidance, and support as they prepare for the finale. On November 20, Lee featured in a Netflix game variety show, New World. On December 6, he rejoined the hit reality TV show, Sing Again, for a second season as its MC and Host. In the same year, he won the Baeksang Arts Award for Best Male Variety Performer for his work in Busted!, Twogether, Hometown Flex, Sing Again and Master in the House. In 2022, Lee hosted the SBS new year special program Circle House – a 10-episode talk show discussing concerns of the MZ generation and seeking solutions with applicants. In 2023, Lee hosted JTBC Peak Time - a show that will offer already-debuted K-pop idols whose activities were halted — whether due to Covid-19, agency issues, or rookie idols who want to step up to the spotlight — a second chance for success. On April 29, 2024, Lee entered into a contract with Big Planet Made Entertainment.

=== 2021–present: As CEO and producer ===
On June 1, 2021, Lee established his own production company called Human Made. For one of its program, the company has prepared a performance exclusively for Moment House Japan which features a hybrid of documentary and live performance content. Lee took part in the production of the show as its executive producer starring Korean-American rapper Jessi. In March 2022, Lee released a Human Made original mini documentary series about food and music titled Human Table on the YouTube under the channel name "Human Made".

== In the media ==
In South Korea, Lee Seung-gi has earned multiple nicknames such as Nation's Umchina (your mother's friend's brilliant son), Nation's Little Brother, and Nation's Heodang (adorable klutz), an image he had earned from his appearance in the show, 1 Night 2 Days. Lee's success as a singer, actor and host also earned him the titles "Triple Threat" entertainer, Emperor, and Prince of Ballad. Other nicknames given to him by the media include Human amulet and Weather fairy.

In 2011 and 2012, he was one of the most in-demand and popular commercial models and celebrity endorsers. Throughout his career, he has endorsed a wide variety of products and services and had ranked high in the monthly endorser survey of the Korea Advertisers Association. On June 23, 2012, Lee was one of the torchbearers in the 2012 London Summer Olympics Torch Relay chosen by Samsung. On October 30, 2012, he was appointed as the Honorary Online Ambassador of the nation's campaign by the National Election Commission of South Korea for a fair and clean presidential election. In 2021, he was dubbed by the media as the MC with "Sincerity and Empathy", a name he earned from the JTBC's talent show, Sing Again. In a survey conducted by DC Inside that was held for seven days in January 2023, Lee was voted the leading star who does good deeds with sincerity and not for keeping up an image.

== Personal life ==
=== Mandatory military service ===
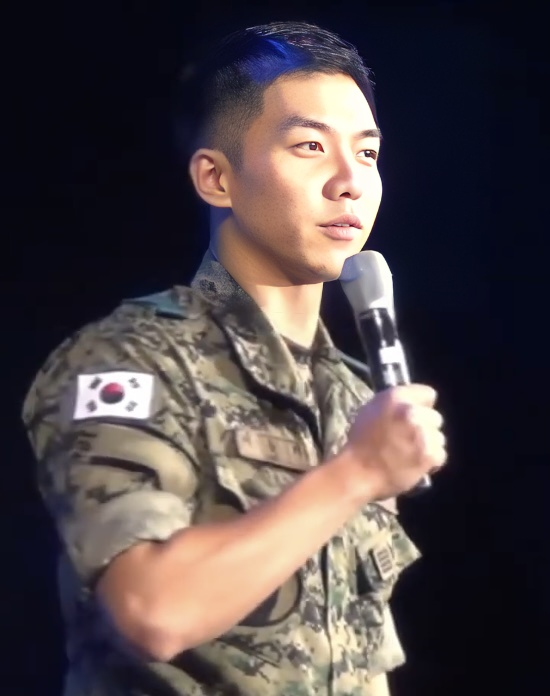
At military concert, 2017

On February 1, 2016, Lee began his 21-month mandatory military service as an active duty soldier, entering Nonsan Army Recruit Training Center in South Chungcheong Province. After training there for five weeks and received the highest score in his training company, he was dispatched to his assigned role following the completion ceremony, where he was awarded the Honors citation. The citation is reportedly given to a total of four people by four companies, one each. He was formally discharged on October 31, 2017, from the military at Jeungpyeong County in North Chungcheong Province where he was a member of the 13th Special Mission Brigade, Republic of Korea Army Special Warfare Command serving as a military intelligence specialist.

During his service, it was reported that Lee had volunteered and completed trainings not required for enlisted soldiers and administrative soldiers, including parachute training, wherein he succeeded in a parachute descent drill conducted 730 meters above the ground. Other optional trainings include Krav Maga level 1 and long distance march of 400 kilometers (about 250 miles), where he was in the top 10% of the 1000 marathoners, as part of the 'Black Panther' Brigade (which was re-designated as a decapitation unit named 13th Special Mission Brigade on December 1, 2017, with the mission of assassinating North Korean leaders in the event of a war breaking out within the two nations).

In October 2016, Lee hosted the military event, 14th Ground Forces Festival, as the goodwill ambassador. The event was co-hosted by Gyeryong and the army, where visitors can experience and watch the Korean military culture.

=== Relationship and marriage ===
Lee began a relationship with actress Lee Da-in in late-2020. They married on April 7, 2023, at the Grand Intercontinental Seoul Parnas in presence of friends and family. Their first child, a daughter, was born on February 5, 2024. The couple welcomed a second child, a son, on July 7, 2026.

== Dispute with Hook Entertainment ==
On November 18, 2022, the dispute between Lee and his agency, Hook Entertainment, was revealed for the first time when Lee had sent a request for transparency of payments to Hook regarding settlements. Later, on November 21, through an independent report by Dispatch, it was revealed that Lee had not been properly settled for 18 years of music revenue and was even gaslighted by his agency since debut.

On November 25, 2022, Hook Entertainment claimed that the debt relationship with Lee has been settled in 2021 when their contract was renewed and the unsettled music revenue is false.

In response, Lee's legal representative made another statement on November 28 to refute Hook Entertainment's claim and said Lee's side never received any music settlement. They further added that the 2021 agreement between Lee and Hook Entertainment concerns ₩4.7 billion in real estate investment in Hook Entertainment which they received from Lee in 2011 for the purchase of its building, but CEO Kwon Jin-young of Hook did not keep her promises related to the investment.

On December 1, 2022, Lee forwarded a notice to Hook Entertainment to terminate their exclusive contract citing Hook's violation of obligations due to unsettled revenue. According to the reports, Hook Entertainment has partially admitted to some earnings from Lee's music distribution not being paid to the artist. As a result, Lee's legal side has obtained evidence to sue Hook Entertainment for violation of management duties, and thus, the artist will be moving forward with the one-sided termination of his contract.

On December 16, 2022, Hook announced that they had additionally paid the base payment of ₩1.3 billion, the unpaid settlement amount of ₩2.9 billion and the delay interest of ₩1.2 billion, which total about ₩5.4 billion to Lee. On the same day, Lee posted on Instagram and revealed that he would donate all of the money he received from the settlement to charity. In his letter, Lee writes that although he has received ₩5.4 billion from Hook, the amount he was to receive was one-sidedly decided by the agency and that even now he wasn't given a full accounting. As such, he will continue with the lawsuit.

Lee officially filed a criminal lawsuit against Hook Entertainment's CEO Kwon Jin-young, as well as its former and current directors on December 22, 2022. It was also revealed in the legal statement that Hook's CEO and directors had embezzled a portion of Lee's advertising model fees, ten percent of his fees were thought to be for agency fees, but in truth, three percent was shared amongst themselves.

On April 4, 2025, it is confirmed that Lee won the lawsuit against Hook Entertainment. Court orders former agency to pay ₩580 million. This is Lee's second win against the agency. The ruling has set a precedence for accountability and transparency in the entertainment industry of Korea, especially in the dynamic between artists and their agencies. Lee's victory has been welcomed with cheers by fans and industry insiders alike as a step in the right direction to protect artist rights.

=== Legacy ===
On April 21, 2023, it has been reported that the Ministry of Culture, Sports & Tourism has passed the Lee Seung-gi Incident Prevention Act. The bill requires entertainment companies to disclose their earnings settlement details to their celebrities at least once a year.

The bill also prohibits agencies from forcing minor-aged celebrities to take excessive care of their appearance or making them work more than seven hours a day.

== Philanthropy ==
Lee has involved himself with various philanthropic activities. Since 2009, he had donated 1 million won weekly to families who appeared on KBS's "Field Report Companion," for total of ₩100 million. In addition to the donations, Lee also volunteered to personally seek out the families and help them.

He had also participated in a charity fan signing event for world hunger relief. The event was held at Seoul Hongdae branch of Pizza Hut on October 28, 2012.

In 2013, Lee donated 5.88 tons of rice to Nowon District, Seoul. According to Nowon District, the 5.88 tons of rice donated by Lee is enough to feed 50,000 children. Nowon District plans to distribute the rice to underprivileged groups in the area, including people receiving national basic livelihood security, lower-income families, and single-parent families.

In 2014, Lee collaborated with CJ E&M to provide assistance to an education contents donation event for low-income female students in the US.

Lee was awarded the 2018 Korea Sharing Volunteer Award for the ₩100 million donation to DongHaeng, volunteer work repairing House of Love, and talent donation to Severance Hospital.

In 2019, Lee donated ₩100 million to Severance hospital for rehab hospital patients' medical expenses. The donation was used to support wheelchairs, prosthetic legs, prosthetic limbs, and posture aids to 23 children and adolescents with spinal cord injuries. He also participated in the '10,000-Won Happiness' mobile donation.

In 2020, to help with COVID-19 prevention and aid underprivileged children in Korea, Lee has donated ₩100 million to Good Neighbors, an international humanitarian and development NGO.

In 2021, Lee along with the cast of Golf Battle: Birdie Buddies, has been donating scholarship money for every birdie scored on the show.

For his 35th birthday on January 13, 2022, Lee became the first charity fairy under the entertainment category on the celebrity ranking service, CHOEAEDOL Celeb. Countless fans, including his fan club – AIREN, joined forces and collected 61,105,486 votes, passed the charity fairy cut line of 55,555,555 votes, making Lee a charity fairy. A total of ₩500 thousand donated to the Miral Welfare Foundation under Lee's name, a fund for the disabled isolated under COVID-19.

On January 27, 2022, Lee had donated ₩100 million to support the children and adolescents who are being treated at the Severance Rehabilitation Hospital. A cumulative of ₩200 million sponsorship to the hospital as of Jan 2022. It is also reported that Lee's fan club – AIREN also joined the sponsorship move and donated ₩10 million to Severance Hospital to celebrate Lee's birthday in 2020. According to the reports, Lee stated:

I was really grateful to receive letters from my young friends, who received help from the last donation, after their treatment and felt that I received much more than I gave. I was also sincerely grateful my fans shared the same mindset as me and joined me. I hope this donation will be of at least a little bit of help so that children can live healthier and happier lives and achieve their dreams.

In December 2022, Lee donated ₩2 billion in development funds to improve the medical environment of Seoul National University Children's Hospital.

On Lee's 36th birthday, January 13, 2023, he donated ₩550 million to Korean Red Cross. The donation was used for mobile meal vehicles to support disaster relief activities and the production of blood donation buses to solve the problem of blood shortages. Lee continues to participate in donations for neighbors in need through various social organizations, including the Korean Red Cross every year.

On February 3, 2023, Lee donated ₩300 million to the Korea Advanced Institute of Science and Technology (KAIST) to lead the development of science and technology. The entire donation will be used to fund the establishment of KAIST's New York campus. He was also appointed honorary ambassador for the New York campus.

On April 24, 2023, Lee and his wife, Lee Da-in donated the money they received as wedding gifts to neighbors in need. Lee donated ₩110 million to the Korean Red Cross. Of these, ₩100 million will be used to provide childcare products to low-income families and ₩10 million was donated to help neighbors affected by forest fires in Gangneung.

On March 15, 2025, Lee donated ₩100 million to the Millennium Foundation.

== Ambassadorship ==
Year	Title	Ref.
2009	Honorary ambassador for the breakfast campaign	
2009	Goodwill ambassador for the joint download service (ConTing) of three terrestrial broadcasters	
2010	Public relations ambassador of the Strategy and Finance Ministry Lottery Commission	
2010	The head of the 3rd Happiness Empathy Volunteer Group	
2010	Public relations ambassador of the Human Network Council of the Ministry of Health and Welfare	
2011	Public relations ambassador of the Strategy and Finance Ministry Lottery Commission	
2011	Head of the 4th Happiness Empathy Volunteer Group	
2012	National Election Committee's online public relations ambassador for the 18th presidential election	
2013	Han Woo-Kim's PR ambassador	
2016	2016 Ground Forces Festival Honorary Ambassador	
2021	Breitling Ambassador	
2022	Public relations ambassador of the National Tax Service	
2022	Public relations ambassador of Craft Trend Fair	
2023	Public relations ambassador of KAIST's New York Campus	
2023	Public relations ambassador for Red Cross' climate crisis resilience	
2025	Public relations ambassador for Red Cross	

== Discography ==
- The Dream of a Moth (2004)
- Crazy For U (2006)
- Story of Separation (2007)
- Shadow (2009)
- Tonight (2011)
- And... (2015)
- The Project (2020)
- With (20AnniversaryAlbum) (2024)

== Awards and nominations ==
Since his debut in 2004, Lee has won various awards, including two Baeksang Arts Awards, three Golden Disc Awards, four Asia Artist Awards, four Mnet Asian Music Awards, five Seoul Music Awards, two KBS Drama Awards, eight SBS Drama Awards, and twelve SBS Entertainment Awards.

Lee has also won five Bonsang Awards (Main Prize), including two from Golden Disc Awards, one from SBS Music Awards and two from Seoul Music Awards. Lee has received nine Daesang Awards (Grand Prize) nominations, winning four Daesangs, including one from KBS Drama Awards, one from Asia Artist Awards, one from KBS Entertainment Awards, and one from SBS Entertainment Awards. Additionally, Lee was honored at the 2014 Korean Popular Culture and Arts Awards, held by the Korean Ministry of Culture, Sports and Tourism, for contributing to Korean culture and spreading Korean Wave, or hallyu. Lee was also selected as the male multi-entertainer of the year at the 2020 Brand of the Year Daesang Award.

In March 2022, Lee was awarded the Presidential Citation as an exemplary taxpayer on the 56th Taxpayers' Day and was appointed public relations ambassador of 2022 for the National Tax Service.
