= Hometown Flex =

South Korean television program

- Promotional poster
- Hangul: 서울촌놈
- Lit.: Seoul Bumpkin
- RR: Seoul chonnom
- MR: Sŏul ch'onnom
- Genre: Reality; Variety; Travel
- Starring: Cha Tae-hyun; Lee Seung-gi
- Country of origin: South Korea
- Original language: Korean
- No. of seasons: 1
- No. of episodes: 11

Production
- Executive producer: Yoo Ho-jin
- Production location: South Korea
- Running time: 70 minutes

Original release
- Network: tvN
- Release: July 12 – September 20, 2020

Hometown Flex (Korean: 서울촌놈; RR: Seoul chonnom) is a South Korean television program that aired on tvN, every Sunday at 22:50 (KST) starting from July 12 to September 20, 2020.

== Overview ==
A "hardcore local variety" show in which two "Seoul Bumpkins" (Cha Tae-hyun, Lee Seung-gi), who have only lived in Seoul all their lives, travel outside Seoul, and experience life outside Seoul by going on local tours guided by celebrities who were born and raised in their hometowns.

== Episodes (2020) ==
- In the ratings below, the highest rating for the show will be in red and the lowest rating for the show will be in blue.

Ep.	Broadcast Date	Location	Guest(s)	Ratings (Nielsen Korea)		Ref.
Ep.	Broadcast Date	Location	Guest(s)	Nationwide	Seoul Capital Area	Ref.
1	July 12	Busan	Jang Hyuk, Lee Si-eon, Simon Dominic	3.177%	3.438%	
2	July 19	Busan	Jang Hyuk, Lee Si-eon, Simon Dominic	3.152%	3.229%	
3	July 26	Gwangju	Kim Byung-hyun, Hong Jin-young, U-Know Yunho (TVXQ)	2.411%	2.504%	
4	August 2	Gwangju	Kim Byung-hyun, Hong Jin-young, U-Know Yunho (TVXQ)	2.250%	2.351%	
5	August 9	Cheongju, North Chungcheong Province	Lee Beom-soo, Han Hyo-joo, Kim Kang-hoon (Note: Only appeared in episode 6)	3.519%	3.577%	
6	August 16	Cheongju, North Chungcheong Province	Lee Beom-soo, Han Hyo-joo, Kim Kang-hoon	2.118%	2.113%	
7	August 23	Daejeon	Kim Jun-ho, Pak Se-ri, Han Da-gam	2.695%	2.961%	
8	August 30	Daejeon	Kim Jun-ho, Pak Se-ri, Han Da-gam	2.251%	2.422%	
9	September 6	Jeonju, North Jeolla Province	Defconn, So Yi-hyun, Yoon Kyun-sang	2.377%	2.705%	
10	September 13	Jeonju, North Jeolla Province	Defconn, So Yi-hyun, Yoon Kyun-sang	1.701%	2.112%	
11	September 20	Special Episode		1.755%	1.864%	(Note: This is the final episode of the show as the COVID-19 pandemic in South Korea made the filming for the show difficult.)
