= Friday Joy Package =

South Korean variety television series

- Hangul: 금요일 금요일 밤에
- Hanja: 金曜日 金曜日 밤에
- RR: Geumyoil geumyoil bame
- MR: Kŭmyoil kŭmyoil pame
- Genre: Reality show Variety show Talk show
- Directed by: Na Young-seok; Jang Eun-jung
- Starring: Yang Jung-moo; Kim Sang-wook; Han Jun-hee; Lee Seo-jin; Hong Jin-kyung; Eun Ji-won (Sechs Kies); Park Ji-yoon; Jang Do-yeon; Lee Seung-gi; Song Min-ho (Winner)
- Country of origin: South Korea
- Original language: Korean
- No. of episodes: 11 (list of episodes)

Production
- Production location: South Korea
- Running time: 90 minutes

Original release
- Network: tvN
- Release: January 10 – March 27, 2020

Friday Joy Package (Korean: 금요일 금요일 밤에; lit. 'Friday Friday Night') is a South Korean television program that aired on tvN every Friday at 21:10 (KST) from January 10 to March 27, 2020.

== Synopsis ==
The program is an omnibus program which consists of six different corners, each corner lasting for only 15 minutes per episode. The genres of the corners are sports, science, art, travel, cooking and labour.

== Corners and cast members ==
Corner Name	Genre	Cast
Life Experience Factory (체험 삶의 공장)	Labour	Lee Seung-gi; Na Young-seok (as Junior Na) (cameo)
Amazing Science Wonderland (신기한 과학나라)	Science	Kim Sang-wook, Eun Ji-won (Sechs Kies), Jang Do-yeon, Song Min-ho (Winner)
Amazing Art Wonderland (신기한 미술나라)	Art	Yang Jung-moo, Eun Ji-won (Sechs Kies), Jang Do-yeon, Song Min-ho (Winner)
Lee Seo-jin's New York New York (이서진의 뉴욕뉴욕)	Travel	Lee Seo-jin; Na Young-seok (cameo)
My Friend's Home's Very Special and Secretive Recipes (아주 특별하고 비밀스런 내 친구네 레시피)	Cooking	Hong Jin-kyung
We're Cheering For You (Note: This corner ended after episode 7 due to the COVID-19 pandemic in South Korea.) (당신을 응원합니당)	Sports	Han Jun-hee, Park Ji-yoon (Note: Absent for episodes 6-7, and Park Seung-hi stood in)

== List of episodes ==
The listing of the corners are based on the sequence it is shown per episode. The corner names are named the genres of the corners.

Episode	Broadcast date	Corner	Description
1	January 10, 2020	Cooking	Guests：Kim Young-chul, Lee Bok-ja (Kim Young-chul's mother) & Kim Ae-sook (Kim Young-chul's elder sister); Cuisine：Grilled Rice Cake Soup
1	January 10, 2020	Science	2020: Future technology
1	January 10, 2020	Sports	Judo; Event：2019 Jeju Cup International Judo Tournament
1	January 10, 2020	Travel	Chinatown is the best in the USA
1	January 10, 2020	Art	The secret of painting price
1	January 10, 2020	Labour	Cockles factory
2	January 17, 2020	Labour	Traditional Yugwa factory
2	January 17, 2020	Cooking	Guests：Yoon Sung-ho, Kim In-seok & Jo Gyu-sun (Yoon Sung-ho's mother); Cuisine：Seafood doenjang bibimbap with chives
2	January 17, 2020	Travel	This is New York
2	January 17, 2020	Science	The Solar system
2	January 17, 2020	Art	Stolen artworks
2	January 17, 2020	Sports	Judo; Event：2019 Jeju Cup International Judo Tournament
—	No new episode on January 24, 2020		
3	January 31, 2020	Cooking	Guests：Oh Sang-jin & Jin Su-yeon (Oh Sang-jin's mother); Cuisine：Fried anchovies with aged kimchi
3	January 31, 2020	Labour	Cheese factory
3	January 31, 2020	Travel	Reply 1989
3	January 31, 2020	Sports	Amateur Ssireum wrestling (Female); Event：2019 President Cup National Ssireum Competition
3	January 31, 2020	Art	The brutal history of art rivalry
3	January 31, 2020	Science	Volcano and earthquake
4	February 7, 2020	Labour	Bamboo salt factory
4	February 7, 2020	Cooking	Guests：Nam Chang-hee & Nam Seong-woo (Nam Hee-suk's father); Cuisine：Fish soup sujebi
4	February 7, 2020	Travel	Amusement Park in the Middle of Winter
4	February 7, 2020	Art	Street art / Mural art
4	February 7, 2020	Science	Sound
4	February 7, 2020	Sports	Amateur Ssireum wrestling (Female); Event：2019 President Cup National Ssireum Competition
5	February 14, 2020	Cooking	Guests：Jessi & Ho Sun-hwa (Jessi's mother); Cuisine：Leek dumplings
5	February 14, 2020	Travel	Amusement Park in the Middle of Winter
5	February 14, 2020	Labour	Laundry factory
5	February 14, 2020	Science	Science stories in movies
5	February 14, 2020	Art	Hidden code in paintings
5	February 14, 2020	Sports	Curling; Event：2019/2020 South Korea Curling League
6	February 21, 2020	Cooking	Guests：Tony Ahn (H.O.T.) & Lee Ok-jin (Tony's mother); Cuisine：Braised Red Crab
6	February 21, 2020	Travel	New York is the best place to dine out
6	February 21, 2020	Labour	Glove factory
6	February 21, 2020	Science	Combustion
6	February 21, 2020	Art	Forgey Scandal
6	February 21, 2020	Sports	Speed skating Event：52nd White Bear Cup Championship
7	February 28, 2020	Labour	Dumpling factory
7	February 28, 2020	Cooking	Guests：Yang Hee-eun & Yang Hee-kyung; Cuisine：Steamed tofu with egg
7	February 28, 2020	Travel	Rich part of New York and the Gossip man
7	February 28, 2020	Art	Dramatic Art
7	February 28, 2020	Science	Gravity
7	February 28, 2020	Sports	Speed skating Event：52nd White Bear Speed Skating Cup
8	March 6, 2020	Science	Optics
8	March 6, 2020	Cooking	Guests：Solbi & Choi Chun-ran (Solbi's mother); Cuisine：Spicy noodles with sliced pork
8	March 6, 2020	Travel	The memories of studying abroad
8	March 6, 2020	Labour	Fan assembly factory
8	March 6, 2020	Art	The history of art materials
9	March 13, 2020	Labour	Pre-fabricated House factory
9	March 13, 2020	Cooking	Guests：Lee Hyun-yi, Kim Jae-hak (Lee Hyun-yi's mother-in-law) & Hong Sung-ki (Lee Hyun-yi's husband); Cuisine：Galbijjim
9	March 13, 2020	Travel	Finding the Korean Wave in New York City
9	March 13, 2020	Art	The Past and Present of Landscape Painting
9	March 13, 2020	Science	Quantum mechanics
10	March 20, 2020	Labour	LP factory
10	March 20, 2020	Cooking	Guests：Nam Chang-hee, Jo Se-ho & Kim Jin-sook (Hong Jin-kyung's mother); Cuisine：Beef tripe soup
10	March 20, 2020	Travel	Old and New York
10	March 20, 2020	Science	Electricity
10	March 20, 2020	Art	Self-portrait drawing
11	March 27, 2020	Labour	Director's cut: Award as per Lee Seung-gi's point of view; Best Master Award — Jung Rak-hyun (Bamboo salt factory); Best Colleague Award — Seo Hong-seok (Cockles factory owner); Best Partner Award — Na Young-seok (a.k.a. Junior Na)
11	March 27, 2020	Cooking & Sports	Director's cut
11	March 27, 2020	Travel	Director's cut: Spaghetti with meatball at a pizza place (Episode 8); Betting on the bill amount at Chinese Dimsum restaurant (Episode 1); Traffic jam in New York; This is for Sam Okyere
11	March 27, 2020	Science & Art	Director's cut and the cast members answering viewers' questions

== Ratings ==
In the ratings below, the highest rating for the show will be in red and the lowest rating for the show will be in blue.

From episode 4 to 7, the ratings are recorded as Part 1 and Part 2.

=== 2020 ===
Ep.	Broadcast date	Nielsen Korea	
Ep.	Broadcast date	Nationwide	Seoul
1	January 10	2.889%	2.979%
2	January 17	2.837%	2.769%
3	January 31	2.827%	3.079%
4	February 7	2.752%	2.788%
4	February 7	1.974%	2.143%
5	February 14	3.066%	3.137%
5	February 14	1.998%	2.072%
6	February 21	3.075%	3.153%
6	February 21	2.202%	NR
7	February 28	3.222%	2.511%
7	February 28	NR	2.323%
8	March 6	2.595%	2.852%
9	March 13	3.379%	3.728%
10	March 20	2.780%	3.103%
11	March 27	2.728%	2.951%
