= Love Forecast =

- Theatrical release poster
- Hangul: 오늘의 연애
- Lit.: Today's Love
- RR: Oneurui yeonae
- MR: Onŭrŭi yŏnae
- Directed by: Park Jin-pyo
- Written by: Lee Byeong-heon; Park Jin-pyo
- Produced by: Jung Dae-hoon
- Starring: Lee Seung-gi; Moon Chae-won
- Cinematography: Seong Seung-taek
- Edited by: Bae Ye-eun
- Music by: Jeong Se-rin
- Production companies: Popcorn F&M
- Distributed by: CJ Entertainment
- Release date: January 15, 2015 (South Korea)
- Running time: 118 minutes
- Country: South Korea
- Language: Korean
- Budget: ₩6 billion
- Box office: US$13.6 million

Love Forecast (Korean: 오늘의 연애; RR: Oneurui yeonae; lit. 'Today's Love') is a 2015 South Korean romantic comedy film co-written and directed by Park Jin-pyo. Starring Lee Seung-gi and Moon Chae-won, the film depicts the relationship between men and women as being as delicate and complex as the weather.

== Synopsis ==
Weather reporter Kim Hyun-woo (Moon Chae-won) is known for her beauty and elegance on television, but off-screen, she drinks and swears a lot. Hyun-woo has been friends for 18 years with Kang Joon-soo (Lee Seung-gi), a mild-mannered elementary school teacher who gives too much of himself in his relationships but always ends up getting dumped. Joon-soo has secretly loved Hyun-woo for years, but she claims she doesn't feel any sexual attraction between them, and he's had to stand by and watch while she fawns over married colleague Lee Dong-jin (Lee Seo-jin) and goes on a blind date with nice but boring photographer Yeom Hyo-bong(Jung Joon-young). Fate turns out that the childhood friends are destined together.

== Cast ==
- Lee Seung-gi as Kang Joon-soo
- Moon Chae-won as Kim Hyun-woo
  - Hong Hwa-ri as young Hyun-woo
- Lee Seo-jin as Lee Dong-jin
- Jung Joon-young as Yeom Hyo-bong/Andrew
- Go Yoon as Jae-joong
- Lizzy as Min-ah
- Ryu Hwa-young as Hee-jin
- Park Si-eun as Joon-hee
- Ha Kyeong-min as Han Seong-gu
- Park Eun-ji as Cha Myung-sun
- Nam Neung-mi as Bath house granny
- Hong Seong-heun as Man at amusement park
- Song Young-chang as Headquarters director
- Im Jong-yoon as General manager

=== Cameo appearance ===
- Im Ha-ryong as Principal
- Kim Kap-soo as Joon-soo's father
- Lee Kyung-jin as Joon-soo's mother
- Kim Bu-seon as Hyun-woo's mother
- Kim Kwang-kyu as Man in Hongdae without an office
- Hong Seok-cheon as My Thai China restaurant owner
- Kim So-yeon as Joon-soo's ex-girlfriend 1
- Son Ga-in as Joon-soo's ex-girlfriend 2

== Production ==
This was Lee Seung-gi's film debut, and his onscreen reunion with Moon Chae-won after the television series Brilliant Legacy in 2009.

Love Forecast began filming in July 2014, and the shoot wrapped on November 9, 2014.

== Box office ==
Love Forecast was released on January 15, 2015. It opened at second place on the South Korean box office, grossing ₩7.80 billion (US$7.23 million) from 972,000 admissions in its first five days. As of February 5, it has grossed ₩14,925,738,687 (US$13,395,272) from 1,892,125 admissions.
