= The Law Cafe =

2022 South Korean television series

- Promotional poster
- Hangul: 법대로 사랑하라
- Lit.: Love According to the Law
- RR: Beopdaero saranghara
- MR: Pŏptaero saranghara
- Genre: Legal; Romance
- Based on: Love According to the Law by Noh Seung-ah
- Written by: Im Ji-eun
- Directed by: Lee Eun-jin
- Starring: Lee Seung-gi; Lee Se-young
- Music by: Gaemi
- Country of origin: South Korea
- Original language: Korean
- No. of episodes: 16

Production
- Executive producer: Kim Sang-hwi (KBS)
- Producers: Ahn Hyeong-jo; Kim Hwan-cheol; Jeong Ho-seok
- Production companies: Jidam Media; Higround

Original release
- Network: KBS2
- Release: September 5 – October 25, 2022

The Law Cafe (Korean: 법대로 사랑하라) is a South Korean television series starring Lee Seung-gi and Lee Se-young. It aired on KBS2 from September 5 to October 25, 2022, airing every Monday and Tuesday at 21:50 (KST) for 16 episodes. It is also available for streaming on Viu in selected regions.

== Synopsis ==
The Law Cafe tells the love story of Kim Jeong-ho (Lee Seung-gi), a former prosecutor who is known as "Monster Genius", and Kim Yu-ri (Lee Se-young), a beautiful lawyer with a four-dimensional personality.

== Cast ==
=== Main ===
- Lee Seung-gi as Kim Jeong-ho

A former prosecutor known as the "Monster Genius". He is currently the owner of a building which houses a law firm that also operates as a cafe. He has a past with Kim Yu-ri.

- Lee Se-young as Kim Yu-ri

A beautiful lawyer with a somewhat eccentric personality. She opens a Law Cafe after resigning from Hwang & Gu Law Firm.

=== Supporting ===
==== Eunha Building Family ====
- Kim Nam-hee as Park Woo-jin

Kim Jeong-ho's cousin and Director of Barun Mental Health Clinic.

- Ahn Dong-goo as Seo Eun-kang

A quiet barista with a handsome face.

- Kim Do-hoon as Bae Joon

A part-time worker at Law Cafe. He is a law student who is taking time off from law school.

- Jang Hye-jin as Kim Cheon-daek

Owner of a happy supermarket across the street from the Eunha building.

- Baek Hyun-joo as Mrs. Choi

Owner of a bakery across the street from the Eunha building.

==== Others ====
- Kim Seul-gi as Han Se-yeon

A police officer who has been a friend of both Kim Jeong-ho and Kim Yu-ri for the past 17 years. She is bold and outspoken.

- Oh Dong-min as Do Jin-ki

A restaurant chef and Han Se-yeon's husband.

- Jo Han-chul as Lee Pyun-woong

Representative of Dohan Construction and the son of President Lee.

- Jeon Guk-hwan as President Lee / Lee Byung-ok

Representative of Dohan group.

- Jeon No-min as Kim Seung-woon

Kim Jeong-ho's father and head of the Seoul Central District Prosecutor's Office. He is the son-in-law of the Dohan group.

- Kim Won-hae as CEO Hwang

Representative of law firm Hwang & Gu Law Firm.

- Hwang Young-hee as Song Ok-ja

Kim Yu-ri's mother.

=== Extended ===
- Lee Min-young as Chae Song-hwa

A single mother who lives in the same neighborhood as Kim Jeong-ho.

- Shin Seung-hwan as President Kim

The owner of the publisher where Kim Jeong-ho is publishing his novel.

- Kim Ba-da as Yo-han

A customer visiting the coffee shop.

- Kwon Da-ham
- Lee Mi-sook as Lee Yeon-joo

Kim Jeong-ho's mother is warm like Ondol and bright as the sun.

- Ahn Se-bin as Kang Yi-seul

Songhwa's daughter.

=== Special appearances ===
- Kim Jae-hwa as Geum-ja

A real estate broker in Golden Real Estate.

- Jo Bok-rae as Jo Seok-hoon

A customer at Park Woo-jin's clinic.

- Go Geon-han as Attorney Meng

A defense lawyer and Kim Yu-ri's opponent.

- Park Sang-hoon as Hong Ji-hoon

School villain. The 'King of the End' is eviler than a simple high school gang.

- Kim Ja-young as Na Mak-rye

Grandma lives on the island, where Jeong-ho and Yu-ri visit for legal advice.

- Kim Young-ok as Wol-seon

Grandma who lives on the island Jungpyeong-do, where Kim Jeong-ho and Kim Yu-ri came to consult the law.

- Shin So-yul as Da-young

Park Woo-jin's Patient Later, she became a stalker who followed Park Woo-jin because she liked him.

- Lee Jae-yong as Choi Yeo-hwan

Member of the Korean Party in Parliament who harassed Chae Song-hwa.

- Oh Min-suk as Baek Geon-man

Kim Yu-ri's ex-boyfriend. He is currently the prosecutor responsible for Songhwa's case.

== Original soundtrack ==
=== Part 1 ===
Released on September 6, 2022
No.	Title	Lyrics	Music	Artist	Length
1.	"Wonderland"	Han Kyung-soo	Han Kyung-soo; Choi Ji-san (Artmatic); Lee Hyun-sang (Artmatic); Lee Do-hyung (AUG), Kiss Me Joy	Cheeze	4:20
2.	"Wonderland" (Inst.)		Han Kyung-soo; Choi Ji-san (Artmatic); Lee Hyun-sang (Artmatic); Lee Do-hyung (AUG), Kiss Me Joy		4:20
Total length:					8:40

=== Part 2 ===
Released on September 13, 2022
No.	Title	Lyrics	Music	Artist	Length
1.	"Can You Feel My Heart" (내 마음을 느끼나요)	Bark; Jeong Gyu-chang	Bark; Jeong Gyu-chang	Jo Yu-ri	3:29
2.	"Can You Feel My Heart" (내 마음을 느끼나요; Inst.)		Bark; Jeong Gyu-chang		3:29
Total length:					6:58

=== Part 3 ===
Released on September 20, 2022
No.	Title	Lyrics	Music	Artist	Length
1.	"When the Rain Stops" (그랬으면 좋겠네)	Midnight	Ant; Midnight	Ailee	4:14
2.	"When the Rain Stops" (그랬으면 좋겠네; Inst.)		Ant; Midnight		4:14
Total length:					8:28

=== Part 4 ===
Released on September 26, 2022
No.	Title	Lyrics	Music	Artist	Length
1.	"I'm In Love With You" (봄바람처럼)	Ant; Midnight	Ant; Midnight; TM	Dvwn	3:26
2.	"I'm In Love With You" (봄바람처럼; Inst.)		Ant; Midnight; TM		3:26
Total length:					6:52

=== Part 5 ===
Released on September 27, 2022
No.	Title	Lyrics	Music	Artist	Length
1.	"More Than Me" (사랑하게 됐나 봐)	Ant; Midnight	Ant; Midnight	June	3:47
2.	"More Than Me" (사랑하게 됐나 봐; Inst.)		Ant; Midnight		3:47
Total length:					7:34

=== Part 6 ===
Released on October 3, 2022
No.	Title	Lyrics	Music	Artist	Length
1.	"Tell Me You Love Me" (별이 빛나는 오늘 밤에)	Ant; Midnight	Ant; Midnight	Punch	3:34
2.	"Tell Me You Love Me" (별이 빛나는 오늘 밤에; Inst.)		Ant; Midnight		3:34
Total length:					7:08

=== Part 7 ===
Released on September 13, 2022
No.	Title	Lyrics	Music	Artist	Length
1.	"Traces of You" (그날의 위로)	Chan Ran	Chan Ran	Standing Egg	3:49
2.	"Traces of You" (그날의 위로; Inst.)		Chan Ran		3:49
Total length:					7:38

=== Part 8 ===
Released on October 10, 2022
No.	Title	Lyrics	Music	Artist	Length
1.	"Walk with Me" (나랑 걷자)	Juniel	Lee Do-hyung (AUG); Juniel	Sunwoo Jung-a	3:37
2.	"Walk with Me" (나랑 걷자; Inst.)		Lee Do-hyung (AUG); Juniel		3:37
Total length:					7:34

=== Part 9 ===
Released on October 11, 2022
No.	Title	Lyrics	Music	Artist	Length
1.	"My Romance"	Ant; Midnight	Ant; Midnight	Lee Joo-hyuk	3:21
2.	"My Romance" (Inst.)		Ant; Midnight		3:21
Total length:					6:42

== Production ==
=== Release ===
The series was initially scheduled to premiere on August 29, 2022, but was pushed back to September 5, 2022

=== Filming ===
On October 13, 2022, it was reported that filming had ended.

== Viewership ==
The Law Cafe : South Korea viewers per episode (thousands)

Season	Episode number																Average
Season	1	2	3	4	5	6	7	8	9	10	11	12	13	14	15	16	Average
1	1228	1332	958	983	976	991	1008	1086	1158	1080	955	1124	978	979	950	929	1045

Source: Audience measurement performed nationwide by Nielsen Korea.

Average TV viewership ratings
Ep.	Original broadcast date	Average audience share		
Ep.	Original broadcast date	Nielsen Korea		TNmS
Ep.	Original broadcast date	Nationwide	Seoul	Nationwide
1	September 5, 2022	7.1% (6th)	7.4% (4th)	5.4% (12th)
2	September 6, 2022	6.6% (9th)	6.5% (9th)	5.2% (12th)
3	September 12, 2022	5.3% (13th)	5.3% (12th)	4.2% (19th)
4	September 13, 2022	6.0% (9th)	5.8% (7th)	4.7% (14th)
5	September 19, 2022	5.5% (13th)	5.5% (9th)	4.3% (17th)
6	September 20, 2022	5.6% (11th)	5.7% (7th)	4.6% (16th)
7	September 26, 2022	5.9% (11th)	5.9% (8th)	4.5% (17th)
8	September 27, 2022	6.5% (7th)	6.5% (6th)	5.5% (10th)
9	October 3, 2022	6.5% (10th)	6.3% (7th)	4.6% (18th)
10	October 4, 2022	6.2% (10th)	6.3% (8th)	5.5% (12th)
11	October 10, 2022	5.4% (13th)	5.1% (14th)	4.5% (17th)
12	October 11, 2022	6.5% (6th)	6.1% (6th)	5.1% (12th)
13	October 17, 2022	5.5% (12th)	5.4% (12th)	4.0% (18th)
14	October 18, 2022	5.8% (8th)	5.8% (7th)	5.3% (13th)
15	October 24, 2022	5.4% (13th)	5.1% (11th)	4.6% (15th)
16	October 25, 2022	5.3% (10th)	5.2% (8th)	4.7% (12th)
Average		5.9%	5.9%	4.8%
In the table above, the blue numbers represent the lowest ratings and the red numbers represent the highest ratings.

== Awards and nominations ==
Name of the award ceremony, year presented, category, nominee of the award, and the result of the nomination
Award ceremony	Year	Category	Nominee(s)	Result	Ref.
KBS Drama Awards	2022	Best Couple Award	Lee Seung-gi and Lee Se-young	Won	
KBS Drama Awards	2022	Grand Award (Daesang)	Lee Seung-gi	Won	
KBS Drama Awards	2022	Best Supporting Actor	Jo Han-chul	Nominated	
KBS Drama Awards	2022	Best Supporting Actress	Kim Seul-gi	Nominated	
KBS Drama Awards	2022	Excellence Award, Actor in a Miniseries	Lee Seung-gi	Nominated	
KBS Drama Awards	2022	Excellence Award, Actress in a Miniseries	Lee Se-young	Nominated	
KBS Drama Awards	2022	Top Excellence Award, Actor	Lee Seung-gi	Nominated	
KBS Drama Awards	2022	Top Excellence Award, Actress	Lee Se-young	Nominated	
KBS Drama Awards	2022	Best Young Actress	Ahn Se-bin	Nominated	
Korea Broadcasting Awards	2023	Best Actor/Actress	Lee Se-young	Won	
Korea PD awards	2023	Best Actor Award	Lee Seung-gi	Won	
