= Golf Battle: Birdie Buddies =

South Korean television show

- Hangul: 편먹고 공치리
- RR: Pyeonmeokgo gongchiri
- MR: P'yŏnmŏkko kongch'iri
- Genre: Reality show Golf
- Directed by: Ahn Jae-cheol; Yoon Jong-ho
- Starring: Lee Seung-gi; Lee Kyung-kyu; Lee Seung-yuop; Yoo Hyeon-joo
- Country of origin: South Korea
- Original language: Korean
- No. of seasons: 5
- No. of episodes: 57

Production
- Production location: South Korea

Original release
- Network: SBS
- Release: July 16, 2021 – present

Golf Battle: Birdie Buddies (Korean: 편먹고 공치리(072); lit. 'Team Up 072') is a South Korean television program that airs on SBS TV starting July 16, 2021. It was originally scheduled to run on every Friday night at 23:30 (KST), but was changed to every Saturday at 18:00 (KST) starting August 7 after garnering positive response from viewers.

== Overview ==
To play golf as a team is more fun than playing alone. The three regular hosts, Lee Seung-gi, Lee Kyung-kyu, and Lee Seung-yuop each form a team to compete with one another. Each team will be rewarded or penalized with shocking punishments accordingly.

== Cast ==
Cast member	Occupation	Introduction	Notes
Lee Seung-gi	Singer, actor, entertainer	'100-Scoring Seung-Pro who's stirring up trouble on the field. He's not very experienced, but you won't know the outcome unless you measure it. A full-of-passion Super Rookie who's surprising everyone with unexpected skills. The growth drama of a golf beginner with 2-year experience is now starting. The 2030 Representative Young Golfer Lee Seung Gi who's chasing his dream of scoring 72.	Season 1-3
Lee Kyung-kyu	Entertainer	A veteran golfer with 30 years of experience. A man who proudly named himself the God of Golf. He is determined to keep his par score 72 even at the age of 72. The legendary founder of golf entertainment shows.	Season 1-present
Lee Seung-yuop	Retired baseball player	A professional baseball player challenging himself in golf with lion instincts. He is making his first appearance in an entertainment show!	Season 1-4
Yoo Hyeon-joo	Golf player	A charismatic golf star player who's seeking victory with professional keenness!	Season 1-present
Park Mi-sun	Entertainer		Season 4-present
Lee Jung-jin	Actor		Season 4
Joo Sang-wook	Actor		Season 4
Tak Jae-hoon	Entertainer		Season 4
Kim Jun-ho	Entertainer		Season 4
Lee Jong-hyuk	Actor		Season 4
Im Chang-jung	Entertainer		Season 4
Kim Jong-min	Entertainer		Season 4-present
Yang Se-chan	Entertainer		Season 4-present
Lee Jung-shin	Entertainer		Season 4-present
Kang Min-hyuk	Entertainer		Season 4
Kang Ho-dong	Entertainer		Season 5
Eun Ji-won	Entertainer		Season 5
Dae-ho Lee	Former baseball player		Season 5
Cha Tae-hyun	Entertainer		Season 5
Hong Kyung-min	Entertainer		Season 5
Young Tak	Entertainer		Season 5
Kang Ho-dong	Entertainer		Season 5
Eric (The Boyz)	Singer and rapper		Season 5
Shin Seung-hwan	Actor		Season 5

== Ratings ==
=== Season 1: 2021 ===
In the ratings below, the lowest rating for the show will be in blue and the highest rating for the show will be in red.

Ep. #	Broadcast Date	Nielsen Korea (Nationwide)
1	July 16, 2021	2.8%
2	July 23, 2021	2.1%
3	July 30, 2021	2.3%
4	August 7, 2021	4.2%
5	August 14, 2021	3.0%
6	August 21, 2021	4.1%
7	August 28, 2021	2.9%
8	September 4, 2021	3.5%
9	September 11, 2021	2.6%
10	September 18, 2021	3.2%
11	September 22, 2021	4.2%
12	September 25, 2021	3.9%
13	October 2, 2021	2.7%
14	October 9, 2021	2.7%
15	October 16, 2021	3.4%
16	October 23, 2021	2.8%

=== Season 2: 2021–2022 ===
In the ratings below, the lowest rating for the show will be in blue and the highest rating for the show will be in red.

Ep. #	Broadcast Date	Nielsen Korea (Nationwide)
1	November 6, 2021	3.3%
2	November 13, 2021	2.0%
3	November 20, 2021	3.1%
4	November 27, 2021	2.7%
5	December 4, 2021	3.1%
6	December 11, 2021	3.8%
7	December 18, 2021	3.4%
8	January 1, 2022	4.1%
9	January 8, 2022	3.6%
10	January 15, 2022	3.6%
11	January 22, 2022	3.2%
12	January 29, 2022	2.6%

=== Season 3: 2022 ===
In the ratings below, the lowest rating for the show will be in blue and the highest rating for the show will be in red.

Ep. #	Broadcast Date	Nielsen Korea (Nationwide)
1	March 19, 2022	3.0%
2	March 26, 2022	2.5%
3	April 2, 2022	2.7%
4	April 9, 2022	2.1%
5	April 16, 2022	2.1%
6	April 23, 2022	2.3%
7	April 30, 2022	2.6%
8	May 7, 2022	2.1%
9	May 14, 2022	2.6%
10	May 21, 2022	2.3%
11	May 28, 2022	2.1%
12	June 4, 2022	2.1%
13	June 11, 2022	2.2%
14	June 18, 2022	2.0%
15	June 25, 2022	2.1%
16	July 2, 2022	2.9%

=== Season 4: 2022 ===
In the ratings below, the lowest rating for the show will be in blue and the highest rating for the show will be in red.

Ep. #	Broadcast Date	Rating
1	August 31, 2022	2.2%
2	September 7, 2022	3.2%
3	September 14, 2022	2.8%
4	September 21, 2022	2.5%
5	September 28, 2022	2.5%
6	October 5, 2022	2.4%
7	October 12, 2022	3%
8	October 19, 2022	2.5%
9	October 26, 2022	2.6%
10	November 9, 2022	2.8%
11	December 7, 2022	2%
12	December 14, 2022	1.9%

=== Season 5: 2023 ===
In the ratings below, the lowest rating for the show will be in blue and the highest rating for the show will be in red.

Ep. #	Broadcast Date	Rating
1	March 22, 2023	2.5%
2	March 29, 2023	2.8%
3	April 5, 2023	2.5%
4	April 12, 2023	2.4%
5	April 19, 2023	2.2%
6	May 3, 2023	1.9%
7	May 10, 2023	2.1%
8	May 17, 2023	2%
9	May 24, 2023	2.4%
10	May 31, 2023	2.2%

== Awards and nominations ==
Year	Award	Category	Recipient	Result	Ref.
2021	2021 SBS Entertainment Awards	Entertainer of the Year Award	Lee Seung-gi	Won	
2021	2021 SBS Entertainment Awards	Entertainer of the Year Award	Lee Kyung-kyu	Won	
2021	2021 SBS Entertainment Awards	Producer Award	Lee Seung-gi	Won	
