= Gu Family Book =

2013 South Korean TV series

- Promotional poster for Gu Family Book
- Also known as: The Love Story of Kang Chi; Kang Chi, the Beginning; Gu Family's Secret; The Writings of Nine Houses; Book of the House of Gu; The Fox Family Book
- Hangul: 구가의 서
- Hanja: 九家의 書
- RR: Gugaui seo
- MR: Kugaŭi sŏ
- Genre: Historical; Romance; Action; Fantasy
- Written by: Kang Eun-kyung
- Directed by: Shin Woo-chul; Kim Jung-hyun
- Starring: Lee Seung-gi; Bae Suzy; Sung Joon; Lee Yu-bi; Yoo Yeon-seok
- Composer: Park Se-jun
- Country of origin: South Korea
- Original language: Korean
- No. of episodes: 24

Production
- Executive producer: Lee Chang-seop (MBC Drama Division)
- Producer: Park Tae-young
- Cinematography: Hae Jae-young; Kim Seon-gi
- Editor: Lee Taek-joo
- Running time: 60 minutes
- Production company: Samhwa Networks
- Budget: ₩8.4 billion

Original release
- Network: MBC TV
- Release: April 8 – June 25, 2013

Gu Family Book (Korean: 구가의 서; also known as Kang Chi, the Beginning) is a 2013 South Korean television series starring Lee Seung-gi and Bae Suzy. The fusion martial arts action historical drama is about a half-man half-monster who is searching for a centuries-old book that according to gumiho legend, contains the secret to becoming human.

Filmed at MBC Dramia in Gyeonggi Province, the series aired on MBC from April 8 to June 25, 2013, on Mondays and Tuesdays at 21:55 for 24 episodes.

== Synopsis ==
After their nobleman father is unfairly accused of being a traitor and killed, Yoon Seo-hwa (Lee Yeon-hee), her younger brother Jung-yoon (Lee David) and their maid Dam (Kim Bo-mi) are sent to a gisaeng house. Seo-hwa's first "patron" is Jo Gwan-woong (Lee Sung-jae), the man who betrayed and killed her father. Before Jo Gwan-woong arrives, Dam swaps clothes with Seo-hwa so that she can run away, chased by Gwan-woong's men. Gu Wol-ryung (Choi Jin-hyuk), a mystical forest protector and gumiho, finds Seo-hwa unconscious and, as he had fallen in love with her, protects her. When Seo-hwa wakes up, she too falls in love with him and marries him after he tells her that both Dam and Jung-yoon were able to run away and are safe. Actually, Jung-yoon has been hanged whereas Dam has committed suicide, but Wol-ryung, unable to tell her the truth, lied to her and did not tell her that he is a gumiho.

Wol-ryung decides to become human in order to be with Seo-hwa. To do so, he must live 100 days without showing his original form to a human, without taking a life, and must help anyone that needs aid. But if he fails, he'll lose any chance of ever becoming human and will become a demon for the next thousand years. Wol-ryung successfully lives most of these days following these rules, but one day, Gwan-woong's men find Seo-hwa alone in the forest. Wol-ryung rushes to help her and reveals his true form, massacring the soldiers. Seo-hwa, horrified, leaves him, and he is later killed by the righteous soldier Dam Pyeong-joon (Jo Sung-ha), who had been told that the gumiho was murdering innocents. Seo-hwa soon discovers that she is with Wol-ryung's child and gives birth to a son. Realizing that the baby isn't a monster and regretting her betrayal of Wol-ryung, Seo-hwa entrusts the baby in the care of a monk, So-jung (Kim Hee-won). She then confronts Gwan-woong, but is killed.

The infant is adopted by nobleman Park Mu-sol (Um Hyo-sup) and grows up as Choi Kang-chi (Lee Seung-gi), ostensibly the son of Lord Park's servant Choi (Kim Dong-kyun), but raised as part of the Park family. Though Mu-sol's wife Lady Yoon (Kim Hee-jung) never warmed up to him, Lord Park loves Kang-chi like his own son, and he is close to the siblings Tae-seo (Yoo Yeon-seok) and Chung-jo (Lee Yu-bi), whom he loves even though she is betrothed to another. Kang-chi is notorious in the village as a troublemaker, but he is good-hearted and loyal, and beloved by the servants at the Hundred Year Inn, which the Park family runs. However, Jo Gwan-woong returns to the village. He believes the wealthy Lord Park has hidden treasure inside the inn and, in his scheme to take over it, Lord Park is killed defending Kang-chi. Gwan-woong throws Tae-seo and his mother in jail, and Chung-jo is sold as a gisaeng and convinced to use her beauty and wiles to someday gain power and revenge. After Kang-chi promises Lady Yoon that he will take care of the Park siblings, she makes a futile attempt to stab Gwan-woong and is killed. Meanwhile, Gwan-woong becomes intrigued by Kang-chi and his seemingly superhuman strength.

In the meantime, Dam Yeo-wool (Bae Suzy) and Gon (Sung Joon) have been dispatched to the village by her father, now martial arts master Dam Pyeong-joon, to investigate a series of murders they suspect Gwan-woong is responsible for. Yeo-wool witnesses the events that befall the Park family and instinctively helps Kang-chi when he is hunted by Gwan-woong's soldiers. During a fight, a soldier slices off Kang-chi's beaded bracelet, which was used to contain his powers. Kang-chi transforms into a half-human, half-beast and easily defeats his enemies. So-jung later tells Kang-chi the truth about his origins, including the mystical and elusive Gu Family Book, which holds the secret to becoming fully human.

Kang-chi is taken under the wing of Yi Sun-sin (Yoo Dong-geun), a naval commander. Yi Sun-sin, Master Dam, and the late Lord Park were part of a secret group protecting the Joseon nation against foreign invasions. Yi places Kang-chi in the martial arts school run by Master Dam. There he is trained physically and mentally and learns to control his transformations. After discovering that under the man's clothes, there's a girl, Kang-chi gradually falls in love with Yeo-wool, and vice versa. But several obstacles remain in their way: the continuing villainy of Gwan-woong; the knowledge that it was Yeo-wool's father who killed Kang-chi's father; the reappearance of Wol-ryung who has turned into a soul-sucking demon with no memories who can only be killed by his son; and Sojung's warning that Yeo-wool is fated to die if she stays by the side of the man she meets beneath the blossoming peach tree under a crescent moon, which is none other than Kang-chi himself.

== Cast ==
=== Main ===
- Lee Seung-gi as Choi Kang-chi
  - Jung Joon-won as young Choi Kang-chi

A half-man, half-gumiho who longs to become fully human. He originally loved Chung-jo, but soon slowly fell in love with Yeo-Wool.

- Bae Suzy as Dam Yeo-wool

A martial arts instructor at her father's school, she is particularly skilled with a bow and arrow. When she was younger, Kang-chi saved her from being attacked by a dog, and she never forgot about him. She then falls in love with him when they meet again. She also accepts Kang-chi for who he is inside, even though he is a divine creature that many people are afraid of.

- Sung Joon as Gon

He has a one-sided love for Yeo-wool, for whom he serves as a bodyguard. He also has a bickering relationship with Kang-chi.

- Lee Yu-bi as Park Chung-jo

Kang-chi's first love. She is promised off to someone in marriage in order to sustain the family-owned-inn's longevity, hence the reason she originally first began spurning Kang-chi's open display of emotions towards her. After the family tragedy, she is forced to become a gisaeng. She makes a pact with Kang-chi that he should come and take her away from her current place once he has proven Lord Park's innocence.

- Yoo Yeon-seok as Park Tae-seo

A cool-headed, responsible scholar who helps his father, Mu-sol run their inn. He comes under a hypnotism that makes him think Kang-chi murdered his father, testing the bonds of their friendship and brotherhood.

=== Supporting ===
- Choi Jin-hyuk as Gu Wol-ryung

Kang-chi's father. He is the guardian spirit of Mt. Jiri. He's fond of traveling outside to see the world and during one such travels comes across Seo Hwa and falls in love with her. They marry, but he keeps his identity hidden until it's revealed, and Seo hwa, being too young and fearful, betrays him with her impulsive actions. A betrayal which costs his 'life' since he loses the will to fight after finding out and doesn't fight back.
Not long after he's 'killed', his body 'dies' and stays still, hidden from everyone's eyes deep in the mountains for several years. After decades, he revives but as a '1000 year demon', stripped of his 'guardian spirit' status. This happens due to him breaking the 100-day oath he took, which he couldn't complete due to certain incidents.
Being a demon leads to him losing the ability to heal or revive. The only thing left was hatred, anger, destruction and death, causing him to go on a rampage, massacring several villages.
It also led to him having memory loss over time, which he predicts that once he's lost it all, he truly would become an agent of chaos, a true demon. To prevent that, he tries to force his son through threats and intimidation in hopes of being put at peace since the only one capable of killing the current him was his own blood, his son Kang-chi.
It isn't until his wife, Seo-hwa sacrifices herself by committing suicide and apologizes that he had a chance of becoming 'alive' again, not as a demon but as a mountain spirit.

- Yoon Se-ah as Yoon Seo-hwa (ep 14–21)
  - Lee Yeon-hee as young Yoon Seo-hwa (ep 1–2, 21)

Kang-chi's mother. She is the daughter of a nobleman who becomes a gisaeng after her father is framed for treason and killed but gets saved by Wol-ryung, who protects and eventually marries her.
She becomes afraid and angry towards Wol-ryung after learning of his true identity and, in impulsiveness, anger and fear, sells off his living place to soldiers, eventually 'killing' him. She tries to get rid of the child inside her womb in fear of it being a monster but fails. She eventually gives birth to the child(Kan-chi) and regrets her actions, asking him not to forgive her. After leaving her son in the monk's care, she goes off to die as her punishment, but survives and disappears.
She returns years later disguised as a Japanese lad,y Ja Hong-myung, and secretly plans her revenge against Jo Gwan-woong but finds her missing son and learns of her husband being alive but amnesic, having turned into a demon mainly due to her actions.
She stops Wol-ryung from causing any more havoc and apologizes for everything that happened. In the end, she commits suicide in order to truly bring Wol-ryung back to life, not as a demon but as a guardian spirit. She dies in his hands after proclaiming her love for him, along with one last apology.

- Lee Sung-jae as Jo Gwan-woong

A villainous nobleman. He lusted after Seo-hwa, then framed and killed her father, destroying many lives. He is now the mastermind behind a string of murders and a traitorous plan against Joseon, and he hunts down Kang-chi.

- Um Hyo-sup as Park Mu-sol

A just and righteous nobleman, Lord Park is beloved by his countrymen and is the father of Tae-seo and Chung-jo. When he finds the orphaned baby Kang-chi inside a basket floating in a river, he takes him in and becomes his surrogate father.

- Jo Sung-ha as Dam Pyeong-joon

A former soldier and now a martial arts master. Yeo-wool's father.
He's the one who leads the soldiers to Wol-ryung's residence since he deems the spirit too dangerous to be left alive. Due to Wol-ryung not fighting back, he manages to strike the spirit, dealing heavy injuries and 'killing' him.
He believes himself to be a part reason of Wol-ryung has turned into a demon and wants to stop the massacre however possible.
Strong ally of Admiral Sun-sin and tough enemy to Gwan-woong after learning of his villainous actions.

- Jung Hye-young as Chun Soo-ryun – The head gisaeng.
- Yoo Dong-geun as Yi Sun-sin – A patriotic naval commander with secret plans for building turtle ships that could aid in fighting against invading Japanese warships.
- Kim Hee-won as So-jung – A Buddhist monk who was Wol-ryung's friend and now watches over Kang-chi.
- Lee Do-kyung as Teacher Gong-dal – A wise old teacher at Master Dam's martial arts school.
- Jo Jae-yoon as Ma Bong-chul – A local gangster whose life is spared by Kang-chi, and becomes loyal to him.
- Kim Dong-kyun as Choi – Lord Park's servant and Kang-chi's adoptive father.
- Jin Kyung as Yeo-joo – Yeo-wool's teacher in domestic skills, who has a crush on Gon.
- Kim Ki-bang as Eok-man – Kang-chi's friend.
- Kim Sung-hoon as Wol-dae – Jo Gwan-woong's chief minion.
- Son Ga-young as Wol-sun – A gisaeng who becomes jealous of Chung-jo, bullying and sabotaging her.
- Kim Hee-jung as Lady Yoon – Mu-sol's wife who resents Kang-chi.
- David Lee McInnis as Kageshima
- Song Young-kyu as Pil-mok – Seo-hwa's assistant.
- Park Joo-hyung as Han Noh
- Nam Hyun-joo as chief maid at the gibang
- Lee David as Yoon Jung-yoon – Seo-hwa's younger brother (ep 1)
- Kim Bo-mi as Dam – Seo-hwa's maid (ep 1)

== Original soundtrack ==
Gu Family Book: Original Sound Track

Soundtrack album by Various Artists
- Genres: Pop, K-pop, soundtrack, R&B, teen pop
- Labels: Samhwa Networks, LOEN Entertainment

Part 1:
No.	Title	Artist	Length
1.	"My Eden"	Yisabel	3:41
2.	"My Eden (Inst.)"	Yisabel	3:41

Part 2:
No.	Title	Artist	Length
1.	"사랑이 아프다" (Love Hurts)	Lee Sang-gon	4:35
2.	"사랑이 아프다 (Inst.)" (Love Hurts)	Lee Sang-gon	4:35

Part 3:
No.	Title	Artist	Length
1.	"사랑이 불어온다" (Love Is Blowing)	Lee Ji-young	4:26
2.	"사랑이 불어온다 (Inst.)" (Love Is Blowing)	Lee Ji-young	4:26

Part 4:
No.	Title	Artist	Length
1.	"봄비" (Spring Rain)	Baek Ji-young	3:41

Part 5:
No.	Title	Artist	Length
1.	"나를 잊지 말아요" (Don't Forget Me)	Suzy	3:40

Part 6:
No.	Title	Artist	Length
1.	"잘 있나요" (Best Wishes to You)	The One	3:51

Single:
No.	Title	Artist	Length
1.	"마지막 그 한마디" (The Last Word)	Lee Seung-gi	4:48

Part 7:
No.	Title	Artist	Length
1.	"너 하나야" (Only You)	4Men	4:50

Part 8:
No.	Title	Artist	Length
1.	"나의 사랑비가 되어줄래" (Will You Be My Love Rain?)	Shin Jae	3:36

Bonus Track:
No.	Title	Artist	Length
1.	"잘 있나요 (acoustic ver)" (Best Wishes To You (acoustic ver))	Choi Jin-hyuk	3:35

== Ratings ==
Ep.	Broadcast date	Average audience share			
Ep.	Broadcast date	TNmS		AGB Nielsen	
Ep.	Broadcast date	Nationwide	Seoul	Nationwide	Seoul
1	April 8, 2013	11.5%	13.1%	11.2%	12.2%
2	April 9, 2013	12.4%	13.4%	12.2%	13.4%
3	April 15, 2013	13.6%	15.2%	13.6%	15.5%
4	April 16, 2013	14.1%	15.7%	15.1%	17.1%
5	April 22, 2013	13.3%	15.4%	14.4%	17.0%
6	April 23, 2013	14.2%	16.5%	15.8%	18.3%
7	April 29, 2013	14.0%	16.2%	16.3%	19.3%
8	April 30, 2013	14.2%	16.2%	16.4%	19.0%
9	May 6, 2013	13.8%	15.5%	15.4%	18.0%
10	May 7, 2013	14.3%	16.2%	14.4%	16.9%
11	May 13, 2013	14.1%	16.3%	14.5%	16.9%
12	May 14, 2013	15.1%	18.2%	15.9%	18.7%
13	May 20, 2013	15.9%	17.2%	14.8%	17.2%
14	May 21, 2013	14.4%	16.9%	15.9%	18.0%
15	May 27, 2013	15.3%	18.3%	16.4%	19.3%
16	May 28, 2013	16.6%	20.1%	18.2%	21.7%
17	June 3, 2013	15.8%	18.2%	17.5%	21.0%
18	June 4, 2013	16.0%	18.9%	18.8%	22.4%
19	June 10, 2013	17.3%	21.0%	18.3%	21.5%
20	June 11, 2013	18.2%	21.7%	19.1%	22.3%
21	June 17, 2013	18.5%	21.8%	18.6%	21.8%
22	June 18, 2013	15.3%	17.5%	16.3%	18.9%
23	June 24, 2013	17.7%	20.2%	17.8%	21.1%
24	June 25, 2013	18.7%	22.1%	19.5%	23.1%
Average		15.1%	17.5%	16.1%	18.9%

== Awards and nominations ==
Year	Award	Category	Recipient	Result
2013	7th Mnet 20's Choice Awards	20's Drama Star - Male	Lee Seung-gi	Nominated
2013	7th Mnet 20's Choice Awards	20's Drama Star - Female	Suzy	Won
2013	7th Mnet 20's Choice Awards	20's Booming Star - Female	Lee Yu-bi	Nominated
2013	8th Seoul International Drama Awards	Outstanding Korean Drama	Gu Family Book	Nominated
2013	8th Seoul International Drama Awards	Outstanding Korean Actress	Suzy	Won
2013	8th Seoul International Drama Awards	Outstanding Korean Drama OST	Spring Rain - Baek Ji-young	Nominated
2013	8th Seoul International Drama Awards	Outstanding Korean Drama OST	Don't Forget Me - Suzy	Nominated
2013	6th Korea Drama Awards	Best Production Director	Shin Woo-chul	Nominated
2013	6th Korea Drama Awards	Top Excellence Award, Actor	Lee Seung-gi	Nominated
2013	6th Korea Drama Awards	Excellence Award, Actress	Suzy	Nominated
2013	6th Korea Drama Awards	Best Couple Award	Lee Seung-gi and Suzy	Nominated
2013	6th Korea Drama Awards	Best Original Soundtrack	Only You - 4Men	Won
2013	5th MelOn Music Awards	Best Original Soundtrack	Only You - 4Men	Nominated
2013	15th Mnet Asian Music Awards	Best Original Soundtrack	Don't Forget Me - Suzy	Nominated
2013	2nd APAN Star Awards	Excellence Award, Actor	Lee Seung-gi	Nominated
2013	2nd APAN Star Awards	Acting Award, Actor	Lee Sung-jae	Nominated
2013	2nd APAN Star Awards	Best New Actor	Choi Jin-hyuk	Won
2013	2nd APAN Star Awards	Best New Actress	Lee Yu-bi	Won
2013	2nd APAN Star Awards	Best Action	Gu Family Book	Won
2013	MBC Drama Awards	Drama of the Year	Gu Family Book	Nominated
2013	MBC Drama Awards	Top Excellence Award, Actor in a Miniseries	Lee Seung-gi	Won
2013	MBC Drama Awards	Top Excellence Award, Actress in a Miniseries	Suzy	Won
2013	MBC Drama Awards	Excellence Award, Actress in a Miniseries	Lee Yeon-hee	Nominated
2013	MBC Drama Awards	Best New Actor	Choi Jin-hyuk	Nominated
2013	MBC Drama Awards	Best New Actress	Lee Yu-bi	Nominated
2013	MBC Drama Awards	Popularity Award	Lee Seung-gi	Won
2013	MBC Drama Awards	Popularity Award	Suzy	Nominated
2013	MBC Drama Awards	Best Couple Award	Lee Seung-gi and Suzy	Won
2014	50th Baeksang Arts Awards	Best New Actor (TV)	Choi Jin-hyuk	Nominated
2014	50th Baeksang Arts Awards	Most Popular Actor (TV)	Lee Seung-gi	Nominated
2014	50th Baeksang Arts Awards	Most Popular Actor (TV)	Choi Jin-hyuk	Nominated
2014	50th Baeksang Arts Awards	Most Popular Actress (TV)	Suzy	Nominated
2014	2nd Asia Rainbow TV Awards	Outstanding Costume Drama	Gu Family Book	Won
2014	2nd Asia Rainbow TV Awards	Outstanding Leading Actor	Lee Seung-gi	Won
2014	2nd Asia Rainbow TV Awards	Outstanding Supporting Actor	Choi Jin-hyuk	Won
2014	2nd Asia Rainbow TV Awards	Best Supporting Actress	Lee Yu-bi	Nominated
2014	2nd Asia Rainbow TV Awards	Outstanding Director	Shin Woo-chul	Won
2014	2nd Asia Rainbow TV Awards	Best Scriptwriter	Kang Eun-kyung	Nominated
2014	2nd Asia Rainbow TV Awards	Best Theme Song	Only You - 4Men	Nominated
2014	16th Seoul International Youth Film Festival	Best Young Actor	Sung Joon	Nominated
2014	16th Seoul International Youth Film Festival	Best Young Actress	Suzy	Nominated
