= My Girlfriend Is a Gumiho =

2010 South Korean TV series

- Promotional poster
- Also known as: My Girlfriend Is a Nine Tailed Fox
- Hangul: 내 여자친구는 구미호
- Hanja: 내 女子親舊는 九尾狐
- RR: Nae yeojachinguneun gumiho
- MR: Nae yŏjach'in'gunŭn kumiho
- Genre: Romance; Comedy; Fantasy
- Written by: Hong Jung-eun; Hong Mi-ran
- Directed by: Boo Sung-chul
- Starring: Lee Seung-gi; Shin Min-a
- Music by: Lee Seon-hee; Park Se-joon
- Ending theme: "Fox Rain" by Lee Sun-hee
- Country of origin: South Korea
- Original language: Korean
- No. of episodes: 16

Production
- Executive producer: Choi Moon-seok (SBS)
- Producers: Kwon Hyuk-chan; Moon Seok-hwan; Hwang Gyu-hyuk
- Running time: 60 minutes
- Production companies: Bon Factory Worldwide; soft line

Original release
- Network: SBS TV
- Release: 11 August – 30 September 2010

My Girlfriend Is a Gumiho (Korean: 내 여자친구는 구미호; RR: Nae yeojachinguneun gumiho) is a 2010 South Korean romantic comedy television series, starring Lee Seung-gi and Shin Min-a. It aired on SBS from August 11 to September 30, 2010 on Wednesdays and Thursdays at 22:00 for 16 episodes.

== Synopsis ==
Cha Dae-woong (Lee Seung-gi) is a normal college student, with ambitions of becoming an action star. One day, he accidentally releases a gumiho (Shin Min-ah), a legendary fox with nine tails who was sealed inside a painting by Samshin Grandmother (三神). Fleeing the scene, Dae-woong suffers a life-threatening fall and is only saved by the gumiho giving him her "fox bead" (여우 구슬). When Dae-woong awakes and meets a mysterious and very beautiful girl, he initially treats her as eccentric or mentally ill, before she discloses that she is actually a gumiho in human form. According to myth, gumihos eat men's livers, so Dae-woong is scared out of his wits, and the gumiho takes advantage of his fear by sticking by his side. He names her "Mi-ho," and keeps her happy by buying her beef and hiding her true identity. Mi-ho wants nothing more than to become human, so they strike a deal: she'll lend him her mystical fox bead so that with his increased speed and strength, he'll be able to do difficult stunts, and in exchange he'll help her become human. As time passes, they get to know each other better and Dae-woong is charmed by how Mi-ho looks at the world with childlike wonder.

Park Dong-joo (No Min-woo), a half-human, half-supernatural being, whose cover identity is a working veterinarian. Dong-joo tells Mi-ho that she'll be able to turn human if she follows these instructions: She must drink Dong-joo's blood then place her fox bead inside a human's body for 100 days. Once she does this, her supernatural self will start to die, gradually. Her gumiho energy will slowly empty away while her bead will live in the human for 100 days and take in his energy. And when she reclaims her bead, she will become human. Mi-ho happily complies, and Dae-woong accepts her bead.

However, Dong-joo deliberately withheld the information that this process will result in the human's death. Mi-ho and Dae-woong thus fall in love without knowing the consequences of fulfilling her goal: in 100 days, Dae-woong will die if Mi-ho becomes fully human, but Mi-ho will die if the bead isn't returned.

== Cast ==
=== Main ===
- Lee Seung-gi as Cha Dae-woong
  - Hyunwoo as young Cha Dae-woong

An immature aspiring actor who lost his parents at a young age, and was subsequently raised by his affluent grandfather and aunt. When his grandfather tries to enroll him in a strict boarding school, Dae-woong runs away and eventually ends up at a Buddhist temple, where a woman's voice tells him to draw nine tails on a painting of a fox. He then meets a girl who informs him that she was the gumiho in the painting (he later calls her Mi-ho). Fearing that she would eat him, he tries to keep her happy by buying her meat (Korean beef in particular, her favorite) and hiding the fact that she's a gumiho from others. As they spend more time together, he's surprised to see that instead of the ferocious figure of legend, Mi-ho is cute and full of wonder, and falls in love with Mi-ho.

- Shin Min-a as Gu Mi-ho/Park Seon-ju/Gil-dal

A legendary nine-tailed fox (or "gumiho" in Korean mythology) who was sealed inside a painting for 500 years. She has dreamed of becoming a human for centuries, but once rumors spread that she's a femme fatale who eats men's livers, and no human man would agree to marry her. She has superhuman strength, can run exceptionally fast, jump great heights, and can identify people and objects from great distances by smell. However, she has a mortal fear of water, since her fox bead (which houses her life energy or "qi") is made from goblin fire. After Dae-woong has an almost fatal fall from a cliff, she gives him her fox bead to keep him alive.

- No Min-woo as Park Dong-joo

A half-human, half-supernatural being who disguises himself as an ordinary veterinarian. His initial mission was to capture the gumiho and put her back into the painting, but upon seeing Mi-ho, he changes his mind as she is the spitting image of Gil-dal, a goblin he'd once loved centuries ago, who was betrayed by her human lover and died at Dong-joo's hand. Suspecting that Mi-ho is Gil-dal's reincarnation, he acts as her mentor, watching over her and supplying her with information about humans. He also constantly warns her that humans cannot be trusted. Dong-joo tells Mi-ho how she can become human, deliberately withholding the fact that Dae-woong will die in the process. He readies all the necessary identifications and papers under the name "Park Seon-joo," which Mi-ho would assume once the 100 days have passed and she's become fully human. He also started to have feelings for Mi-ho.

- Park Soo-jin as Eun Hye-in

Dae-woong's older classmate and love interest whom he calls "noona"; Dae-woong stopped liking Hye-in after spending some time with Mi-ho. When Mi-ho becomes Dae-woong's girlfriend, she becomes jealous, and attempts to throw a wrench into their relationship by investigating Mi-ho's true identity.

=== Supporting ===
- Sung Dong-il as Ban Doo-hong

Stunt director and head of the action school that Dae-woong attends. He is also the widowed father of Ban Sun-nyeo. Doo-hong idolizes Hong Kong star Chow Yun-fat and tries to imitate him in his appearance and manner of speaking. He falls for Dae-woong's aunt Cha Min-sook.

- Yoon Yoo-sun as Cha Min-sook

Dae-woong's aunt. She was never married and is very obedient to her father. She's unable to express her feelings for Ban Doo-hong, causing her to often make a fool of herself in his presence.

- Byun Hee-bong as Cha Poong

Dae-woong's strict but loving grandfather. He's concerned that his spoiled and shallow grandson isn't making good choices in life. He becomes fond of Mi-ho upon meeting her, and sees that being with her has made Dae-woong more mature and responsible. He eventually accepts Dae-woong's dream of becoming an actor.

- Kim Ho-chang as Kim Byung-soo

Dae-woong's best friend and classmate in action school. He is supportive of Dae-woong, and secretly likes Sun-nyeo.

- Hyomin as Ban Sun-nyeo

Dae-woong's friend and the daughter of Ban Doo-hong. After she gets over her crush on Dae-woong, she finally realizes that Byung-soo likes her and reciprocates his love.

=== Special appearances ===
- Im Hyun-sik as Buddhist monk (ep 1, 8, 15)
- Lee Soo-geun as police officer (ep 4)
- Uee as art major in college (ep 5)
- Park Shin-hye as Go Mi-nyeo (ep 6)
- Lee Hong-gi as Jeremy (ep 16)
- Kim Ji-young as Samshin grandmother (ep 15, 16)

== Original soundtrack ==
My Girlfriend is a Gumiho OST

Soundtrack album by Various Artists
- Released: 2010
- Genre: Soundtrack
- Languages: Korean; English
- Label: Hook Entertainment

=== Part 1 ===
No.	Title	Artists	Length
1.	""Losing My Mind" (정신이 나갔었나봐)"	Lee Seung-Gi	4:12
2.	""From Now on I Love You" (지금부터 사랑해)"	Lee Seung-Gi	4:01

=== Part 2 ===
No.	Title	Artists	Length
1.	"The Person I Loved (미호 Theme)"	Lee Seul-bi	3:39
2.	"Ooh La La"	Kim Gun-mo	3:33

=== Part 3 ===
No.	Title	Artists	Length
1.	"Sha La La"	Shin Min-a	3:35
2.	"I Can Give You All (다 줄 수 있어)"	Shin Min-a	4:38

=== Part 4 ===
No.	Title	Artists	Length
1.	"Love Theme (둘이 하나)"	Lyn, GB9	3:32

=== Part 5 ===
No.	Title	Artists	Length
1.	"Losing My Mind"	Lee Seung Gi	3:07

== Ratings ==
Date	Episode	Nationwide	Seoul
2010-08-11	1	12.7% (6th)	13.0% (6th)
2010-08-12	2	12.6% (8th)	13.1% (8th)
2010-08-18	3	14.6% (6th)	14.9% (6th)
2010-08-19	4	14.1% (7th)	14.0% (7th)
2010-08-25	5	14.0% (6th)	14.1% (6th)
2010-08-26	6	14.2% (8th)	14.1% (8th)
2010-09-01	7	13.4% (9th)	13.4% (9th)
2010-09-02	8	13.4% (12th)	13.6% (12th)
2010-09-08	9	13.2% (9th)	12.8% (9th)
2010-09-09	10	12.3% (11th)	12.6% (11th)
2010-09-15	11	13.0% (9th)	12.8% (9th)
2010-09-16	12	10.7% (11th)	10.4% (11th)
2010-09-22	13	20.9% (1st)	21.3% (1st)
2010-09-23	14	20.9% (1st)	21.3% (1st)
2010-09-29	15	18.6% (3rd)	18.6% (3rd)
2010-09-30	16	21.3% (2nd)	21.0% (2nd)
Average		15%	15%

Source: TNS Media Korea

== Reception ==
My Girlfriend Is a Nine-Tailed Fox achieved both nationwide and international success topping ratings in South Korea during its 2-month run. It is one of the most awarded and nominated South Korean series of all time receiving high honors including Best Foreign Soap Opera at the USTv Students' Choice Awards in the Philippines and earning both Lee Seung-gi and Shin Min-ah excellence awards at the SBS Drama Awards.

The drama has also accumulated over 180,000,000 views on Chinese streaming platform Youku and an average of 11,000,000 views per episode (as of April 2016) making it one of the most watched South Korean dramas online in the country.

== Accolades ==
=== Awards and nominations ===
Award	Year	Category	Recipient	Result	Ref
MelOn Music Awards	2010	Bonsang - Top 10 Artist	"Losing My Mind" - Lee Seung-gi	Won	
MelOn Music Awards	2010	Best OST Song	"Losing My Mind" - Lee Seung-gi	Won	
Bugs Music Awards	2010	Best OST	"I Love You Starting Now" - Lee Seung-gi	Nominated	
SBS Drama Awards	2010	Excellence Award, Actor in a Drama Special	Lee Seung-gi	Won	
SBS Drama Awards	2010	Excellence Award, Actress in a Drama Special	Shin Min-ah	Won	
SBS Drama Awards	2010	Best Supporting Actress in a Drama Special	Yoon Yoo-sun	Nominated	
SBS Drama Awards	2010	New Star Award	No Min-woo	Won	
SBS Drama Awards	2010	Top 10 Stars	Lee Seung-gi	Won	
SBS Drama Awards	2010	Top 10 Stars	Shin Min-ah	Won	
SBS Drama Awards	2010	Best Couple Award	Lee Seung-gi and Shin Min-ah	Won	
SBS Drama Awards	2010	Netizen's drama of the year	My Girlfriend Is a Nine-Tailed Fox	Nominated	
DramaBeans Awards	2010	Favorite Drama of 2010	My Girlfriend Is a Nine-Tailed Fox	Won	
DramaBeans Awards	2010	Favorite Comedic Drama	My Girlfriend Is a Nine-Tailed Fox	Won	
DramaBeans Awards	2010	Favorite Lead Couple	Shin Min-ah & Lee Seung-gi|style="background: #9EFF9E; color: #000; vertical-align: middle; text-align: center; " class="yes table-yes2 notheme"|Won		
DramaBeans Awards	2010	Best Kiss	Shin Min-ah & Lee Seung-gi|style="background: #9EFF9E; color: #000; vertical-align: middle; text-align: center; " class="yes table-yes2 notheme"|Won	Won	
DramaBeans Awards	2010	Favorite character	Shin Min-ah	Won	
DramaBeans Awards	2010	Favorite character	Lee Seung-gi	Nominated	
DramaBeans Awards	2010	Best Villain	Park Soo-jin	Nominated	
DramaBeans Awards	2010	Favorite Alternate Pairing	No Min-woo & Shin Min-ah	Nominated	
DramaBeans Awards	2010	Breakout Performance of The Year	No Min-woo	Nominated	
DramaBeans Awards	2010	Best Performance	Lee Seung-gi	Nominated	
Style Icon Awards	2010	Style Icon Actress (TV)	Shin Min-ah	Won	
Seoul International Drama Awards	2011	Outstanding Korean Drama	My Girlfriend Is a Nine-Tailed Fox	Nominated	
47th Baeksang Arts Awards	2011	Male Popularity Award - TV	Lee Seung-gi	Nominated	
47th Baeksang Arts Awards	2011	Female Popularity Award - TV	Shin Min-ah	Nominated	
USTv Students' Choice Awards	2012	Best Foreign Soap Opera	My Girlfriend Is a Nine-Tailed Fox	Won	

=== Listicles ===
Publisher	Year	List	Ranking	Ref.
Naver	2010	Most searched Terms in 2010	3rd	

== See also ==
- Foxes in popular culture, films and literature
