= Little Forest (TV program) =

Korean television program

- Hangul: 리틀 포레스트
- RR: Riteul poreseuteu
- MR: Rit'ŭl p'oresŭt'ŭ
- Genre: Children's series; Reality television; Variety show
- Written by: Oh Yoo-seon; Lee Seong-jeong; Lim Jung-mi; Yang Ji-in; Lee Seon-hye; Park Hee-kyung; Kim Na-rin; Lee Seong-hee; Rose; Kim Hye-lim
- Directed by: Kim Jung-wook; Cho Yong-jae; Park So-hyeon; Ahn Jung-hyun; Kwon Hyeong-gu; Yoo Sun-myeong
- Starring: (Various artistes)
- Country of origin: South Korea
- Original language: Korean
- No. of episodes: 16

Production
- Camera setup: Multi-camera
- Running time: 60–80 minutes
- Production company: SBS

Original release
- Network: SBS TV
- Release: 12 August – 7 October 2019

Little Forest (Korean: 리틀 포레스트) is a South Korean television entertainment program broadcast by SBS every Monday and Tuesday from 12 August to 7 October 2019. The program starred Lee Seo-jin, Lee Seung-gi, Park Na-rae and Jung So-min.

== Overview ==
The program is a 16-episode series program to "Caring for Kids in the Nature" for children who have no place to play with and is a healing variety program designed as a home kids garden development project for children. The kids will spend 2 days and 1 night with the cast, away from their parents for the first time.

Lee Seung-gi and Jung So-min are certified child psychology counselor and Lee Seo-jin is a certified chef who went through training for a cooking course to cater for young kids. Park Na-rae also took a cooking course. Lee Seung-gi has some experience in woodworking and utilizes the wood workshop to build fun activities for the kids.

== Location and facility ==
The filming location is at Jjigbaggol, Inje, Gangwon Province with the land area of about 33,000m^{2}. The place consists of a big open field with an open concept kitchen, front yard, workshop, living quarters (for kids and cast), garden, small animal farm and Pine forest.

=== Addition of facilities ===
- Suspension bridge — Seung-gi, Seo-jin and So-min added a suspension bridge course in the Pine forest for the kids to play with. Further improvement is made in episode 3 to adapt to younger kids.
- Treehouse — Seung-gi designed and built a treehouse, in the Pine forest, under the supervision of a teacher in episode 5. Seo-jin and the workers help in the construction of the treehouse.

== Airtime ==
Airdate	Broadcast Start Time (KST)	
12 August – 7 October 2019	Part 1	Mondays & Tuesdays at 10:00 pm
12 August – 7 October 2019	Part 2	Mondays & Tuesdays at 10:40 pm

== Cast ==
=== Main cast ===
Name	Episode	Notes
Lee Seo-jin	1 – 16	
Lee Seung-gi	1 – 16	
Park Na-rae	1 – 16	
Jung So-min	1 – 16	

=== Kids ===
- Listing of the kids are in the sequence of arrival at the Little Forest.

Name	Korean Age	Gender	Episode
Ma Yi-hyeon	4	male	1 – 8, 16
Brooke	5	female	1 – 16
Grace	5	female	1 – 16
Kang Yi-han	7	male	1 – 16
Choi Yoo-jin	4	female	1 – 16
Lee Jeong-heon	6	male	5 – 8, 12 – 14, 16
Kim Ye-jun	4	male	8 – 9, 16
Kim Ga-on	6	female	8 – 9, 16
Kim Yoo-na	5	female	12 – 14, 16

== Ratings ==
- In the ratings below, the highest rating for the show will be in red, and the lowest rating for the show will be in blue.

Episode	Broadcast Date (2019)	AGB Nielsen (Nationwide)	
Episode	Broadcast Date (2019)	Part 1	Part 2
1	12 August	5.1%	6.8%
2	13 August	3.5%	5.0%
3	19 August	3.1%	5.2%
4	20 August	4.0%	5.4%
5	26 August	3.0%	3.5%
6	27 August	3.1%	4.5%
7	2 September	3.9%	4.7%
8	3 September	3.6%	4.2%
9	9 September	2.9%	4.1%
10	16 September	3.5%	3.9%
11	17 September	3.4%	4.5%
12	23 September	3.2%	3.5%
13	24 September	2.9%	3.6%
14	30 September	2.8%	3.5%
15	1 October	3.1%	3.6%
16	7 October	3.0%	3.8%

== Awards and nominations ==
Year	Award	Category	Recipient(s)	Result	Ref.
2019	13th SBS Entertainment Awards	SNS Star Award	Park Na-rae	Won	
2019	13th SBS Entertainment Awards	Producer's Award	Lee Seung-gi	Won	
