= Busted! =

South Korean variety show

- Season 1 promotional poster
- Hangul: 범인은 바로 너
- Hanja: 犯人은 바로 너
- Lit.: The Culprit Is You
- RR: Beomineun baro neo
- MR: Pŏminŭn paro nŏ
- Genre: Mystery; Thriller; Variety show
- Starring: Yoo Jae-suk; Ahn Jae-wook; Kim Jong-min; Lee Kwang-soo; Park Min-young; Oh Se-hun; Kim Se-jeong; Lee Seung-gi
- Country of origin: South Korea
- Original language: Korean
- No. of seasons: 3
- No. of episodes: 28

Production
- Executive producers: Jang Hyuk-jae; Cho Hyo-jin; Kim Ju-hyung
- Running time: 62–97 minutes
- Production companies: SangSang Company; Netflix Services Korea Ltd.

Original release
- Network: Netflix
- Release: May 4, 2018 – January 22, 2021

Busted! (Korean: 범인은 바로 너; RR: Beomineun baro neo) is a South Korean television program on Netflix starring Yoo Jae-suk, Ahn Jae-wook, Kim Jong-min, Lee Kwang-soo, Park Min-young, Oh Se-hun, Kim Se-jeong and Lee Seung-gi. It premiered on May 4, 2018, and concluded on January 22, 2021.

The program is a Netflix Original that is co-produced with SangSang Company, a Korean production company that is responsible for X-Man, Running Man, and Family Outing. The show is Netflix's first original program to showcase an all-Korean cast. During a press briefing, producer Cho Hyo-jin mentioned that Netflix's goal is to create a hit show for South Korea, which can then be "consumed on the global stage". The show mixes both scripted and unscripted lines.

The first season consists of 10 episodes; two episodes a week were released from May 4 to June 1, 2018. On May 30, 2018, Netflix published a press release announcing the program had been renewed for a second season. All ten episodes were released on November 8, 2019. On February 16, 2020, the show was renewed for a third season. Similar to second season, all eight episodes were released on January 22, 2021. Two weeks prior to the premiere of the third season, it was announced that the latter would conclude the show.

== Synopsis ==
=== Season 1 ===
Seven celebrity sleuths discover that they are a part of an operation called Project D, in which they are implanted with a chip containing the DNA of famous detectives throughout history. Led by a man only known as "K" (Ahn Nae-sang), they are recruited as private detectives and are given a new case in each episode, all the while gradually uncovering the mystery behind Project D and its inception.

=== Season 2 ===
One year after the incidents of Season 1, the detectives reunite along with a new recruit to unveil the truth of K's death. With different murder cases that are interconnected, they conclude to search for the notorious serial killer named "Flower Killer".

=== Season 3 ===
With old faces back on the team, the detectives investigate a series of bewildering cases that seem to be linked to Hwalbindang, the secret organization who is responsible for killing the criminals.

== Cast ==
Cast	Season 1 2018	Season 2 2019	Season 3 2021
Yoo Jae-suk	Main	Main	Main
Ahn Jae-wook	Main	Main	
Kim Jong-min	Main	Main	Main
Lee Kwang-soo	Main	Guest	Main
Park Min-young	Main	Main	Main
Oh Se-hun	Main	Main	Main
Kim Se-jeong	Main	Main	Main
Lee Seung-gi		Main	Main

== Episodes ==
Each episode features guest celebrities. Unlike other Korean variety show formats, guests for Busted! play characters many of whom have the same names as the celebrities themselves. The characters are somehow involved in the murder mystery in each episode and/or lead the cast to clues for solving the murder mystery.

=== Series overview ===
Season	Episodes	Originally released	
Season	Episodes	First released	Last released
1	10	May 4, 2018	June 1, 2018
2	10	November 8, 2019	
3	8	January 22, 2021	

=== Season 1 (2018) ===
No. overall	No. in season	Title	Original release date
1	1	"Forewarned Murder"	May 4, 2018
A man named M invites seven people to a murder game party hosted by his boss, known as K. As soon as the game begins, M is shot by an unknown perpetrator, which turns the game into a real crime scene. They soon realize that the murder is related to an operation called "Project D", in which they are also involved in. Using the tarot cards given by a gypsy as their clues, the seven witnesses must attempt to find the culprit before it reaches the next victim. Guests: Yoo Yeon-seok, Kangnam, Kim Jung-tae, Lee Jae-yong, Park Na-rae, Ye Ji-won Note: Kim Se-jeong did not appear in this episode
2	2	"Treasure Island"	May 4, 2018
After being recruited by K, the amateur detectives travel to Jeju Island in order to help a museum director retrieve an artifact that belonged to his deceased friend. With the help of a local news reporter and a tourist from Seoul, they embark on a treasure hunt around the island. Meanwhile, K reveals that, in the past, an error in the chip that was implanted in the detectives had caused them to slowly lose their memories, which led him to abandon Project D. Guests: Ahn Nae-sang, Woo Hyun, Kim Soo-ro, Hong Jong-hyun
3	3	"Kwang Soo, a Murderer"	May 11, 2018
While on a vacation in Jeju Island, Kwang-soo wakes up with a hangover and finds a dead woman in his room. Fearing that the police will brand him as a suspect, he flees the scene and decides to find the murderer himself. The six other detectives receive a call from K, saying that Kwang-soo has become a murder suspect. This leads them to investigate the case in an effort to prove his innocence, or else they would have to arrest him. Guests: Ahn Nae-sang, Lee Ki-woo, Lee Chang-min, Lee Guk-joo, Lee Myung-hoon, Jo Yoon-ho, Moon Kyu-park, Choi Min-jae
4	4	"Messages From the Dead"	May 11, 2018
Jong-min encounters a child who gives him the diary of a teen girl. He finds out that the girl had recently died at Songdo Central Park under mysterious circumstances and receives a call from K, who tells him to gather the detectives at the high school where she attended to look into her death. During the investigation, the detectives discover that her friends have been receiving text messages from her even after she died. Guests: Ahn Nae-sang, 5urprise (Yoo Il, Seo Kang-joon, Gong Myung, Kang Tae-oh, Lee Tae-hwan), Kangnam, Kang Jae-joon, Lee Eun-hyung, Ji Yoon-ha
5	5	"The Last Vampire"	May 18, 2018
An ex-criminal, whom Jae-wook had arrested during his days as an agent, tells him that a woman was murdered in his hometown, a small island near Incheon. When the detectives go to the island, they discover that the residents believe that a vampire lives in the island and kills a woman whenever anyone tries to investigate on the murders happening in the village. Meanwhile, K tells them that one of the doctors involved in Project D was from the same island. Guests: Ahn Nae-sang, Park Hae-jin, Lee Won-jong, Kim Shin-young, Nam Chang-hee (actor)
6	6	"Battle of the Detectives"	May 18, 2018
Two rival curators of an art museum enlist the help of K's detectives and the Genius Detective Team in an attempt to outshine each other. The competition between the two teams becomes fierce as they must find the self-portrait of a recently deceased artist before the painting is auctioned off on the same night. Guests: Ahn Nae-sang, Jung Jae-hyung, Lee Juck, Lee Jang-won (Peppertones), Shin Jae-pyung (Peppertones), John Park, Wendy (Red Velvet), Kim Beom-soo, Kangnam, Min Ji-young, Choi Young-wan
7	7	"The Vanished Magician"	May 25, 2018
The detectives attend a magic show rehearsal to support Se-hun, who would be opening the show with a dance performance. During the rehearsal, the magician mysteriously disappears while performing one of his tricks, which sends the crew in a panic as the show would be happening in a few hours. As a result, the director asks the detectives to find him before the show begins. Guests: Ahn Nae-sang, Choi Hyun-woo, Shin Hye-jeong (AOA), Jung Hye-sung, Jo Woo-jong, Joshua Seth
8	8	"The Mysterious Gentleman"	May 25, 2018
A man claiming to be K's old friend challenges the detectives to solve a 20-year-old case through a series of tests in order to measure their skills in criminal investigation. Each test has a different goal, and the first detective to complete a test is rewarded with a large sum of money. The man also promises to provide the passcode for the box that the detectives had obtained in Jeju Island, which contains valuable information about Project D. Outside the mission, Se-jeong is seen leaving flowers for M at a columbarium. Guests: Ahn Nae-sang, Jang Gwang, Ahn Il-kwon, Yoon Sung-ho, Lee Moon-jae, Seo In-a, Kriesha Chu, Shin So-i, Kim Beom-joon, Yoo Yeon-seok
9	9	"Operation: Criminal Transport"	June 1, 2018
Yeon-seok turns himself in and requests that K's detectives should be the one to transport him to prison. Although this confuses the detectives, they accept his request in exchange for information about Project D and his involvement with it. While on their way to prison, Jae-suk receives a phone call from an unknown man demanding Yeon-seok to be brought to him, or else, a bomb that he planted onto a stranger's bag will be detonated. Guests: Yoo Yeon-seok, Jeong Jun-ha, Kang Sung-jin, Lee Jae-young
10	10	"The Disappearance of K"	June 1, 2018
The detectives receive a scheduled message from K that was written three months ago, during the planning of the murder game party. He tells them that a final test for them is waiting at a safe house in Incheon. However, they also receive a message from a familiar voice saying that he has kidnapped K. Guests: Cha Yu-ram, Kim Jung-tae, Yoon Hyung-bin

=== Season 2 (2019) ===
No. overall	No. in season	Title	Original release date
11	1	"Hell of the Gods: Tartarus"	November 8, 2019
K's detectives find themselves chained and trapped in separate rooms. When they manage to get out, they find Jae-suk, who explains that he survived the explosion and has since been watching over them secretly. Under the guise of Tartarus, he and K created the missions to test their ability to work as a team. Things do not go as planned when the detectives realize that Kwang-soo has disappeared with a mysterious microchip and that K has been murdered by a serial killer called the "Flower Killer". Guests: Lee Kwang-soo, Im Won-hee, Kim Min-jae, Yoon Jong-hoon
12	2	"Serial Killing"	November 8, 2019
With C being a potential suspect of K's murder, the detectives visit the psychiatric hospital where he is confined only to discover that he escaped. They find his body at the office of Stephanie Lee, a profiler who frequently visited C, and notice that his wounds are the same as K's. After numerous investigations, they realize that someone is murdering Project D's researchers to seek revenge. Guests: Park Jin-joo, Jung Jae-hyung, Stephanie Lee, Tae Hang-ho, Lee Yoo-jin, Kim Min-jae
13	3	"Odd Eye: Detective Team vs Phantom Thief"	November 8, 2019
A client recruits the detectives to ensure the safety of the Odd Eye, a family heirloom, before the Phantom Thief steals it first. Meanwhile, K's detectives have decided to open a position for a new member. Yook Sung-jae, a new intern with a cocky personality, helps them with the mission. Guests: Yook Sung-jae, Jin Se-yeon, Ahn Il-gwon, Tae Hang-ho
14	4	"Along with the Gods; The Return of the Genius Detective Team"	November 8, 2019
While the detectives wait for their client, a new applicant, Hani, arrives and they immediately take a liking to her. However, they discover that she has also applied to be a part of the Genius Detective Team, who soon show up at the same place. With Hani joining the Genius Detectives, the rival teams once again try to outdo each other to win a portion of a shaman's lottery winnings. Guests: Hani, Jung Jae-hyung, Lee Juck, John Park, Lee Jang-won (Peppertones), Shin Jae-pyung (Peppertones), Kim Hwan, Yoon Jong-hoon, Stephanie Lee, Shin A-young, Park Kyung, Jung Jin-young
15	5	"There Lives a Devil"	November 8, 2019
K's detectives cautiously welcome former detective Lee Seung-gi into their team after he gains them a client. A supposedly simple investigation becomes complicated when they discover the client's body inside her house, with her neighbor being the prime suspect. They also discover that this neighbor is a fan of the Flower Killer and their murders. Guests: Kim Dong-jun, Tae Hang-ho, Min Sung-wook, Kim Min-jae Note: Lee Seung-gi joins the cast.
16	6	"The Curse of the Shaman"	November 8, 2019
A distressed girl sends her friend's urn to Jae-suk and believes that she died by murder instead of committing suicide. The detectives visit her hometown called Guiyi Village in the South Jeolla Province to investigate her claim. There, they notice that there are no men in the village and that, except for the shaman, everyone is deaf. They soon realize that all the young girls have disappeared and supernatural occurrences seem to happen around them. They also discover that Stephanie is the shaman's daughter. Guests: Lee Yong Nyeo, Yoon Jong-hoon
17	7	"The Chairman's Secret"	November 8, 2019
With a large amount of money involved, the detectives split up into different alliances to help three chaebol sons find the will of their late father. One of them is revealed to be Sergeant Kim Min-jae, who has been distancing himself from the family out of shame. While on the way to one of their missions, he discloses that K's autopsy report shows that he had died of poisoning long before he was stabbed, implying that someone else had murdered him. Guests: In Gyo-jin, Kim Ji-hoon, Kim Min-jae, Byun Jung-soo, Tae Hang-ho, Yoon Bo-ra
18	8	"The Two Clients: The Guys' and Girls' Case Records"	November 8, 2019
While Se-jeong and Min-young are nowhere to be found, the male detectives are invited to shoot an episode of the Curious Detective Show with Iz*One. They are tasked to solve the fictitious abduction of two of their members, but they soon realize that someone has kidnapped them for real. The detectives gradually discover that this case connects to their past investigations, as well as to forensic investigator Yoo Jong-hoon, Stephanie, and the Flower Killer. Guests: Kim Hwan, Iz*One, Stephanie Lee
19	9	"The 5 Flower Killers"	November 8, 2019
The detectives secretly initiated to attend an interactive role-playing mystery game called Killosophy using an invitation given to them by Stephanie. The game is a reenactment of the Flower Killer's murders, including K's, and those who are invited are his worshippers called "Sophias". By following each murder, the detectives are able to collect clues that lead them to the identity of the serial killer. Guests: Yoon Jong-hoon
20	10	"The Flower Of Death"	November 8, 2019
The detectives investigate the suspected Flower Killer's house and find Stephanie dead in a hidden room. With the Flower Killer watching them, they receive photos showing Jong-hoon and Detective Im Won-hee being held captive, and the latter explains that he and Stephanie created Killosophy to lure the Flower Killer. The detectives then receive a video from the culprit, which leads them to a desolate place with murals of flowers. There, they discover the truth behind the murders they have encountered so far. Guests: Ahn Il-kwon, Yoon Jong-hoon, Kim Min-jae, Im Won-hee

=== Season 3 (2021) ===
No. overall	No. in season	Title	Original release date
21	1	"Share House Food Lupin"	January 22, 2021
The son of a deceased mystery author asks for the detectives' help to find out which of his housemates has been stealing his food. Thinking that the case is easy, Kwang-soo believes it to be the perfect time to rejoin the team, which annoys the detectives. They soon realize that the case is much more complicated and everyone in the house is hiding something suspicious. Meanwhile, Seung-gi asks Jong-min to meet him in an unknown area where they are chased by a group of men. While trying to escape, Seung-gi is run over by a truck and is sent to a hospital, where he and Jae-suk meet again. Guests: Suho, Im Soo-hyang, Han Bo-reum, Kim Kyung-jin, Jo Byung-gyu, Jung Seok-yong
22	2	"Detectives Reunited; Two New Cases"	January 22, 2021
The detectives split up when they are hired to solve two cases on the same day. One team is tasked to find out what happened to a professor who was starved to death, while the rest attempt to solve a murder in a gambling den. Various clues and evidence lead both teams to believe that the cases are linked to the murder of Gruntrack, one of the housemates from the previous case. Meanwhile, Seung-gi is diagnosed with selective amnesia and does not remember himself as the Flower Killer. Though the detectives are initially against it, they let him join the team as they think that his life could be in danger. Guests: Tae Hang-ho, Kwon Jae-kwan, Ko Kyu-pil, Hwang Bo-ra, Joo Hye-ji, Jung Seok-yong, Baek Seo-yi
23	3	"The Missing Body"	January 22, 2021
When the detectives discover a mysterious website that claims to guarantee humans a place in heaven, Se-jeong and Min-young decide to use themselves as bait to uncover the truth behind the website. They find out that the website lures vulnerable women into an abandoned hospital and kills them to sell their organs and body parts. While one of the culprits are caught and escorted by the police, an unknown sniper shoots and kills him. Guests: Ko Kyu-pil, Hwang Bo-ra, Yoon Joo-man, Kim Gi-du, Shin Min-jae, Lee Yong-bum
24	4	"Nam Uk-gun and Seonnyeo"	January 22, 2021
Nam Uk-gun, CEO and heir to a high fashion brand, decides to hold a party in an attempt to look for Seonnyeo, his childhood friend and fiancee. However, he had last seen her as a child and has forgotten what she looks like. He hires the detectives to look for the real Seonnyeo among the girls at the party so he can marry her, which was his grandfather's final wish. Guests: Rowoon, Pyo Ye-jin, Kim Hye-yoon, Kim Bo-ra, Tae Hang-ho
25	5	"Hostage; The Live"	January 22, 2021
The detectives receive a package containing a flash drive with a video. In it, different footages and photos of an old crime scene appear. A sudden broadcast signal intrusion was hijacked around the country, shows a footage of a masked man holding a woman hostage. Addressing the detectives directly, he threatens them to solve the case in the video, or else, he would kill the woman. Because of the limited time given to them by the masked man, the detectives enlist the help of users in an online forum. Guests: Yum Dong-hun, Park Hyo-joo, Tae Hang-ho, Kim Il-joong, Yoo Jae-pil, Greg Priester
26	6	"I Just Died"	January 22, 2021
Min-young meets with the team while holding a bouquet of cistus sent by their client. The same client sends them a letter, who tells them that he would have died by the time they receive the flowers. While investigating the case, Seung-gi confides in Jae-suk about his whereabouts before his amnesia: he discovered that a large organization with a scale symbol has been killing criminals involved in the detectives' past and present cases. Because of this, Seung-gi (as the Flower Killer) is one of its targets. He also discovered that one of the detectives is a member of the organization, which lead him to fake his amnesia so he could rejoin the team and find out who it is. Guests: Oh Man-seok, Kang Hong-seok, Kim Kang-hyun, Kim San-ho, Ko Kyu-pil, Hwang Bo-ra, Lee Su-ji
27	7	"The Ghost Client; The Case of the Imposter Detectives"	January 22, 2021
After being confronted by an angry client, the detectives realize that someone has been impersonating them to scam clients. At a cafe, they meet another client, who is possessed by a ghost, as well as a group of people pretending to be them. With both teams claiming to be the real detectives, they go against one another to solve the case. Midway through the investigation, each team notices that one of their members is missing. The culprit of the case is also shot by a sniper. When the detectives go to the rooftop where the sniper would have been, they find a note from Hwalbindang, the secret organization who responsible for killing the criminals. The note tells them that Seung-gi, the Flower Killer, will be killed next. Guests: Song Ji-hyo, Ahn Bo-hyun, Jo Se-ho, Kwanghee, Yoo Byung-jae, Ravi, Ha Sung-woon, Seunghee, Ahn So-mi
28	8	"The Scale of Destiny"	January 22, 2021
The detectives suspect that Min-young may be working for Hwalbindang and they go to an abandoned village full of traps to find her. Seung-gi decides to face Min-young himself and leaves the others during the search. Meanwhile, the detectives find the flash drive that Kwang-soo stole when he disappeared. It contains a list of potential criminals, which was gathered by Project D, and includes Min-young. On the computer screen, Hwalbindang's godmother reveals that she has killed Seung-gi and is planning to eliminate everyone else on the list. With only an hour given to them, the detectives must find a way to get to Min-young before a bomb is detonated. Guests: Im Soo-hyang, Ahn Bo-hyun, Kim Hye-yoon, Tae Hang-ho

== Development and production ==
Cho Hyo-jin, one of the executive producers of Busted!, stated that he and the other producers pitched a variety show to Netflix where ordinary people can become detectives and solve cases, and Netflix liked the concept. The initial title for the show was "Dumb and Dumber Detective".

=== Season 1 ===
On September 27, 2017, it was reported that the final lineup for the show would consist of Yoo Jae-suk, Ahn Jae-wook, Kim Jong-min, Lee Kwang-soo, Park Min-young, EXO's Oh Se-hun, and Gugudan's Kim Se-jeong. According to Cho, Lee Kwang-soo and Kim Jong-min were added to the cast to highlight the "dumb and dumber" aspect of the show, while Ahn Jae-wook and Park Min-young were added due to their serious personalities.

Filming for Busted! began on September 27, 2017, with Yoo Yeon-seok being confirmed as the show's first guest. The show was initially set to be released in March 2018. The first two episodes premiered on Netflix on May 4, 2018.

=== Season 2 ===
On May 30, 2018, Netflix renewed the show for a second season. On September 6, 2018, it was reported that the original cast would return for the second season, apart from Lee Kwang-soo who would not be joining due to scheduling conflicts. In a Netflix event held in November 2018, producer Jang Hyuk-jae announced that Lee Seung-gi would join the cast. Netflix announced that the second season was scheduled to premiere on November 8, 2019.

The episodes are shorter than the first season because "although some of the viewers liked the show's length because it felt like watching a movie, others said that the episodes were too long" according to producer Kim Dong-jin. There are also several fixed guests who appear multiple times during the season and who play a more important role than in the first season.

Due to his drunk driving incident in February 2019, Ahn Jae-wook did not promote the second season with the rest of the cast. He was removed from the opening credits and did not appear on the promotional posters.

=== Season 3 ===
On January 17, 2020, it was reported that Lee Kwang-soo was in talks to return for the third season of the show. On February 16, 2020, Busted! was officially renewed for a third season. Filming began in April and ended in early June. The release date was teased on Instagram by the cast on December 14–16, with the season premiere of January 22, 2021 being officially confirmed by Netflix on December 17. On January 19, the cast and producer Cho Hyo-jin held an online media conference to promote the final season.

== Accolades ==
Name of publication, year awarded, name of the record, and the name of the record holder
Publication	Year	World record	Record holder	Ref.
Guinness World Records	2021	The smallest printed magazine advertisement	Busted!	
