= Lee Myung-han =

South Korean producer (born 1970)

- Born: June 17, 1970 (age 56); Chungcheongbuk-do, Seoul, South Korea
- Other names: M.H. Rhee; Rhee Myung-han
- Education: Departemen of Business Administration Kyung Hee University
- Occupation: Producer
- Years active: 1995–present
- Employers: KBS (1995–2011); CJENM (2011–2022); CJ Studio—Egg is Coming (2023–present)

Korean name
- Hangul: 이명한
- RR: I Myeonghan
- MR: I Myŏnghan

Lee Myung-han (Korean: 이명한; born June 17, 1970), also known as M.H. Rhee, is a South Korean producer and entertainment executive. He is currently a CEO of Egg is Coming, a content production company which is a subsidiary of CJ Studio under CJ ENM.

He used to be known by his nickname Lee PD, the term "PD" is commonly used in Korean television to denote a "producer-director" or "production director." Lee worked as director for shows such as Star Golden Bell, Happy Sunday: Heroine 5, Happy Sunday: Heroine 6, Happy Sunday: High-Five. However he is best known for directing and producing the popular KBS variety-reality shows 2 Days & 1 Night, and as creative producer for popular tvN variety-reality shows Grandpas Over Flowers and their spin-offs.

== Early years and education ==
Lee Myung-han was born June 17, 1970, in Cheongju, North Chungcheong Province. He attended Unho High School before enrolling in the Department of Business Administration at Kyung Hee University. During his college years, he actively participated as a member of an amateur rock band, and his passion for music fueled his aspiration to become a show producer.

== Career ==
=== Career in KBS as director and producer ===
After graduating in 1995 with a Bachelor of Business Administration, Lee joined KBS as a director through the 22nd KBS open recruitment. He began his career as an assistant director in the network's variety department, contributing to shows such as Open Concert and Celebrity Relay.

In 2002, Lee assumed his first official directing role with the show Declaration of Freedom Today is Saturday – The War Of Roses. The program involved male entertainers and female college students meeting and searching for a partner at a mountain lodge. It was during this program that Lee crossed paths with writer Lee Woo-jung, who served as the main writer, as well as two assistant directors, Na Young-seok and Shin Won-ho. In the same year, Lee was in charge of directing Super TV Sunday is Fun. His colleagues took charge of directing each segment of the show, with Na Young-seok directing Let's Go! Dream Team – Season 1 and Shin Won-ho directing Kung Kung Ta. Lee later collaborated with them again on Star Golden Bell in 2004. He temporarily separated from both when he directed the music show Yoon Do-hyun's Love Letter.

Lee and Na Young-seok reunited with writer Lee Woo-jung when they were both in charge of directing Heroine 5. Heroine 5 was one of the segments of Sunday 101%, which was renamed Happy Sunday since November 2004. It was broadcast from April 4, 2004, to May 1, 2005, on KBS 2. It was followed by the sequel, Heroine 6, which aired from May 8, 2005, to April 29, 2007, on KBS 2. When Lee and Na Young-seok developed other segments, Shin Won-hoo took over as the director.

Lee and Na Young-seok collaborated to create two new segments for Happy Sunday: High Five and Are You Ready? High Five aired on KBS 2TV from May 6, 2007, to May 18, 2008. Hosted by Jee Seok-jin, the show focused on five female stars as they embarked on different job experiences. From flight attendants to farmers, stuntwomen to police officers, the stars took on various roles. Given their diverse backgrounds, comedic twists and events were often incorporated into their training. The initial lineup of High Five included comedian Jo Hye-ryun, entertainer Hyun Young, singer Chae Yeon, MC Park Kyung-lim, and actress Kim Min-sun.

Happy Sunday: Are You Ready? aired from May 6, 2007, to July 29, 2007. Hosted by Kang Ho-dong, the cast included Lee Soo-geun, Eun Ji-won, Kim Jong-min, Noh Hong-chul, and Ji Sang-ryeol. The show revolved around the cast and special guests engaging in a variety of games. The initial episodes focused on games related to the Chinese language, while subsequent episodes featured physical and logic-based games. Unfortunately, due to poor ratings, Are You Ready? was discontinued after airing 12 episodes.

Following the discontinuation of Are You Ready? Lee, Na Young-seok, and Lee Woo-jung created a replacement segment titled 2 Days & 1 Night. The initial cast included most of the members from Are You Ready?, such as Kang Ho-dong, Lee Soo-geun, Eun Ji-won, Kim Jong-min, Noh Hong-chul, and Ji Sang-ryeol. Later, Kim C, Lee Seung-gi, MC Mong, and Uhm Tae-woong joined the cast. 2 Days & 1 Night revolutionized Korean reality programming by introducing the road trip format. The show featured a regular cast who embarked on trips to different towns across South Korea, spending one night and two days there. During these trips, they engaged in various activities such as games, camping, and sightseeing.

Lee and Na Young-seok achieved a breakthrough with 2 Days & 1 Night, which became a massive success, gaining immense popularity and becoming the highest-rated variety program on KBS. It captivated audiences nationwide, achieving a peak viewership rating of 40%. The show not only had a positive impact on the featured locations by boosting tourism but also garnered a massive fan base for its cast members and production crew. Na Young-seok, in particular, gained recognition as he frequently appeared onscreen during interactions with the cast, earning the affectionate nickname "Na PD" from Korean audiences.

In December 2008, Lee stepped down from his role in the production of 2 Days & 1 Night. He then assumed the position of Happy Sunday's Team Leader (Producer). In 2009, Lee collaborated with writer Lee Woo-jung on a new segment for Happy Sunday titled Qualifications of Men, with Shin Won-ho serving as the director. This variety show aired on KBS2 from March 29, 2009, to April 7, 2013. Subtitled as "101 Things a Man Must Do Before He Dies," the show featured a group of male celebrities with diverse ages and personalities. They undertook missions aimed at helping them become "real men." These missions encompassed a wide range of challenges, both physical and emotional. Throughout the show, the participants met various mentors from different fields, learning valuable skills along the way.

In February 2011, Lee made headlines for his plan to study musicals for a year at Goldsmiths College, University of London, England. However, he actually withdrew from his programs due to conflicts with KBS's superiors. As a result, he was compelled to study abroad. Subsequently, on April 27, 2011, several media reports emerged stating that Lee would be transferring to CJ E&M.

=== Career in CJ ENM ===
In July 2011, Lee Myung-han joined CJ E&M as the chief producer in the Entertainment Department. CJ E&M is the owner of various cable channels, including tvN. During the "tvN Foundation 5th Anniversary Conference," Song Chang-eui (Director of tvN) and Lee Deok-jae (Broadcasting Planning Director) unveiled the program lineup and content production investment plan for 2012. One of the highlights of the lineup was a new concept reality program created by Lee Myung-han and writer Lee Woo-jung, known for her work on 2 Days & 1 Night. The program was scheduled to air on tvN the first half of the following year.

In early 2012, Lee debuted on the cable channel tvN with the reality program called The Romantic. To create the show, Lee sought the assistance of director Yoo Hak-chan, writer Lee Woo-jung, and junior writer Kim Dae-joo, which were former crew members from 2 Days & 1 Night. The 12-episode show introduced a unique concept of a dating game show. Ten ordinary young men and women embarked on a journey to unfamiliar locations, gradually getting to know each other and seeking true love. The filming took place in Dubrovnik, Croatia, spanning over a period of 9 nights and 10 days from late December to early January. Dubrovnik, renowned as the pearl of the Adriatic Sea for its breathtaking location in the Balkans, is a popular honeymoon destination for Europeans. It has also gained recognition as a filming location for a coffee commercial featuring actress Go Hyun-jung. The Romantic premiered on tvN at 11:00 pm on a Saturday in February 2012.

There were also high expectations for a collaboration between Lee and his junior, Shin Won-ho, on a new reality program, as reported in a news coverage in November 2011. However, in April 2012, tvN announced that Shin Won-ho was actually directing a drama titled Reply 1997, scheduled to air in June. Lee Myung-han served as executive producers and Lee Woo-jung as the scriptwriter. The drama starred Seo In-guk, Eun Ji-won, Jung Eun-ji, Hoya, Lee Si-eon, Lee Il-hwa, and Sung Dong-il. This project held significance for Shin Won-ho as it marked his first work at CJ E&M after transferring from KBS in July of the previous year.

After a month-long delay, the first self-produced drama by tvN, Reply 1997, finally broadcast on July 24, 2012. The series revolves around the lives of six friends from Busan. The storyline jumps back and forth between their teenage years as high school students in 1997 and their present lives as 32-year-olds attending their high school reunion dinner in 2012, where a couple announces their engagement. It also highlights the emergence of extreme fan culture in the 1990s, with the rise of the first generation of idol groups like H.O.T. and Sechs Kies, as well as the beginnings of the flourishing K-pop industry.

The show garnered high ratings and received critical acclaim, establishing itself as one of the highest-rated Korean dramas in cable television history. Its authenticity, humor, and heartfelt storytelling have been praised by both viewers and critics, who also appreciate its well-researched and refreshing approach to the genre. Following its broadcast, the show was credited with starting the "retro" trend in South Korea, and media and cultural commentators have observed a growing fascination with 1990s pop culture. Specifically, the show reignited interest in the "first generation" of K-pop idol groups who achieved fame in the 1990s before the Korean Wave and were not as widely known to international audiences as the younger generations of idols.

In the same year, Lee once again collaborated with director Yoo Hak-chan, writer Lee Woo-jung, and junior writer Kim Dae-joo for his second reality programming pilot Three Idiots Season 1. Jun Hyun-moo took on the role of the host, and the cast included Lee Soo-geun, Kim Jong-min, and Eun Ji-won. All cast members, except Jun Hyun-moo, were original members of Season 1 of 2 Days & 1 Night. The show premiered on tvN on October 7, 2012, marking the first time a weekend entertainment program in Korea was broadcast live. Starting from November 11, 2012, Three Idiots became a segment of 'Sunday N tvN,' a 135-minute program that featured two segments within a framed composition. During the live broadcasts of Three Idiots, a pre-recorded program titled The Romantic and Idol was also aired.

In March 2013, Lee delivered a lecture during the CJ E&M New Production PD Recruitment Information Session, which aimed to recruit new talents. Prior to that, in January 2013, Lee played a role in recruiting his junior, the infamous Na Young-seok, to CJ E&M. The company reportedly enticed Na with not only higher compensation but also the promise of creative control.

Under Lee's leadership as CP, Na Young-seok reunited with writer Lee Woo-jung, and together they created Grandpas Over Flowers, a travel-reality show that featured four veteran actors in their seventies: Lee Soon-jae, Shin Goo, Park Geun-hyung and Baek Il-seob. Alongside them, actor Lee Seo-jin in his forties joined as their porter for their backpacking tours to various international destinations. The show's title is a wordplay/parody of the popular Japanese manga Boys Over Flowers (花より男子, Hana Yori Dango) and also references the 2009 South Korea drama adaptation of the manga. The first season of Grandpas Over Flowers aired from July 5 to August 16, 2013, on tvN, consisting of seven episodes. It was filmed in Paris, Strasbourg, Bern, and Lucerne. The success of the first season led to the immediate airing of the second season from August 23 to September 20, 2013, comprising five episodes that were filmed in Taiwan, featuring Sunny as Lee Seo-jin's assistant.

In April 2013, tvN announced the second installment of the Reply Series. Despite having the same writer, director, and producer, as well as the inclusion of Sung Dong-il and Lee Il-hwa in the cast, Reply 1994 is not a prequel to Reply 1997. While it maintains the concept of a coming-of-age drama combined with 1990s nostalgia, it introduces a completely new plot and characters. Initially, director Shin Won-ho and writer Lee Woo-jung intended to set their first Reply series in 1994, the year they were college freshmen. However, after casting Sechs Kies member Eun Ji-won, they decided to change the year to 1997. This decision was influenced by the fact that the fandoms of H.O.T. and Sechs Kies were at their peak in 1997, which created an interesting contrast to the struggling South Korean economy during the IMF crisis. Feeling that they had enough material for another series, Shin and Lee returned to their original plan and created Reply 1994.

In September 2013, Lee produced the pilot episodes of Island Teacher. After receiving positive reviews during its pilot debut, the show was organized as a regular series. Directed by Kim Jong-hoon, it featured a cast of four foreigners: Sam Hammington from Australia, Brad from the US, Abigail from Paraguay, and Sam Okyere from Ghana. These four members became native English teachers for elementary school students at a branch school in an island village.

Following that, Lee collaborated with Yoo Hak-chan on Ha Jung-woo Brothers, a reality road talk show that followed actor Ha Jung-woo and his close friends, including actors Jung Kyung-ho, Kang Shin-cheol, and Ko Sung-hee, on a two-day impromptu trip. The show's premise involved escaping the city and traveling with a limited budget of 200,000 won. The production team used candid cameras and minimal intervention, allowing the natural interactions and experiences of the cast to unfold. It was broadcast on tvN on October 11, 2013.

Lee and Na Young-seok also produced the first spin-off of Grandpas Over Flowers, titled Sisters Over Flowers. It aired between the second and third seasons of Grandpas Over Flowers and showcased the adventures of four middle-aged actresses: Youn Yuh-jung, Kim Ja-ok, Kim Hee-ae, and Lee Mi-yeon. Accompanying them on their journey to Croatia was the 27-year-old singer-actor Lee Seung-gi. It was broadcast on tvN from November 29, 2013, to January 17, 2014.

On November 5, 2013, Lee was appointed as the Chief of Production Planning at tvN. In January 2014, he was invited as one of the speakers at the 1st CJ Creative Forum Culture Talk. His contributions and achievements led to his promotion in October 2014 to the esteemed position of Director, overseeing both cable channel tvN and StoryOn. Notably, within just three years since joining CJ E&M, Lee swiftly advanced from the role of Chief to Director.

In early 2014, Lee and Na Young-seok participated in the 2nd CJ Creative Forum Culture Talk, which took place at Yonsei University Auditorium in Sinchon, Seoul. In the same year, Lee recruited his former KBS juniors, Shin Hyo-jung, who directed Hwasin: Controller of the Heart on SBS, and Go Min-goo, director of Immortal Songs on KBS. Lee was recognized as a leader who led the golden era in cable channels.

During his time as the Director of tvN, Lee oversaw the production of various shows and also served as a producer for some of them. One notable production was Grandpas Over Flowers Season 3, which was filmed in Spain. Following that, its second spin-off called Youth Over Flowers was created. Having younger casts, Na Young-seok pushed the backpacking concept to the extreme by informing the cast about the trip only few hours before their flight, resulting in them traveling without any luggages. The first and second seasons featured a cast composed of three singer-songwriters in their forties (Yoon Sang, You Hee-yeol and Lee Juck) and three actors in their twenties and thirties (three actors from Reply 1994, Yoo Yeon-seok, Son Ho-jun and Baro), who went to Peru and Laos, respectively.

Additionally, Grandpas Over Flowers Season 4 was filmed in Dubai and Greece, with Choi Ji-woo joining as Lee Seo-jin's assistant. It was aired in tvN from March 27 to May 8, 2015. Followed by Three Meals a Day: Jeongseon Village, where Lee starred alongside his former co-star from drama series Wonderful Days, Ok Taecyeon. It was a show that originated from a joke during the filming of Grandpas Over Flowers, "Cooking King Seo-jinnie," a fake cooking show that joke about Lee Seo-jin's lack of cooking skill.

In 2015, Na Young-seok won Grand Prize at 51st Baeksang Arts Awards, marking the first time in history that an entertainment director received the award, for variety shows he created under Lee's leadership.

Lee's approach to production involved taking risks and considering the potential success of projects in the overseas market, even if they didn't generate high viewership ratings domestically. This was evident in the case of the program Let's Go Time Expedition, directed by Kim Hyeong-oh. Despite not achieving high ratings in South Korea, it was anticipated to be well received in China, and it was produced based on those predictions. Lee acknowledged that the predictions turned out to be accurate.

In September 2015, Lee introduced OtvN, a new entertainment broadcasting channel. Interestingly, OtvN was a rebranding StoryOn, a cable channel owned by CJ E&M. Along with the rebranding, Lee took on the role of Director at OtvN, overseeing its operations and strategic direction.

To celebrate tvN's 10th anniversary in October 2015, Lee unveiled an impressive lineup of dramas. The highly anticipated third installment of the Reply series, Reply 1988, broadcast from November 6, 2015, to January 16, 2016. Another notable drama in the lineup was Cheese in The Trap, starring Park Hae-jin and Kim Go-eun, also scheduled for release in January. Additionally, Signal, written by renowned writer Kim Eun-hee and featuring acclaimed actors Kim Hye-soo, Lee Je-hoon, and Cho Jin-woong, was also set to air in January. In March, viewers could look forward to the thriller drama Memory, starring Lee Sung-min and directed by Park Chan-hong. In May, the highly anticipated drama Dear My Friends, directed by Hong Jong-chan and written by Noh Hee-kyung, featured a star-studded cast including Kim Young-ok, Kim Ji-young, Kim Hye-ja, Na Moon-hee, Joo-hyun, Park Won-sook, Go Doo-shim, Go Hyun-jung, Shin Sung-woo, Zo In-sung, Sung Dong-il, and Lee Kwang-soo. There was also the possibility of Youn Yuh-jung's involvement, making the drama's lineup comparable to that of an ensemble cast like the Avengers.

On November 17 to 18, 2015, Lee was invited to The 'International Contents Conference (DICON) 2015', where he emphasized the importance of content creators becoming brands. The event, hosted by the Korea Creative Content Agency, took place at COEX in Samseong-dong, Seoul. The theme of the event was 'Contents, Connection, and Expansion'. In December 2015, based on personnel information disclosed by CJ Group, Lee Myung-han, who was the Head of tvN headquarters, was promoted to the position of managing director.

In January 2016, Lee also served as creator African edition of Youth Over Flowers. Na Young-seok "kidnapped" Ahn Jae-hong, Ryu Jun-yeol, and Go Kyung-pyo while they were on a vacation in Phuket, Thailand. The vacation had been arranged by the production crew of the TV drama Reply 1988 as a reward for its success. Na Young-seok took them to Namibia in Southern Africa. Park Bo-gum had to make his own way from Seoul to Namibia after participating in another TV program. They spent 10 days in Africa and visited popular destinations like Victoria Park and Dune 45.

Under Lee's leadership at tvN, the network achieved several significant milestones. One notable accomplishment was the expansion of tvN Asia. In April 2016, tvN announced the rebranding of Channel M as tvN Asia, starting from June 3. Channel M had been providing content to about 7.8 million households through 40 platforms in 10 Southeast Asian countries, including Hong Kong, Singapore, Malaysia, Indonesia, Taiwan, and the Philippines. The aim of this move was to enhance the network's brand competitiveness in Korea and provide a more diverse and enjoyable content experience to viewers in Southeast Asia.

In October 2016, tvN celebrated its 10th anniversary by organizing a special two-day event on October 8 and 9 to engage with its viewers. The 'tvN10 Festival' took place at KINTEX in Ilsan, Gyeonggi-do, and offered recreated program booths, fun games, and delicious tastings. Additionally, there was an exclusive live session featuring popular stars.

As part of the anniversary celebrations, tvN hosted its first awards ceremony, known as the tvN10 Awards. The event started with a glamorous red carpet on the 9th at 6:30 pm, followed by two parts. Kang Ho-dong and Shin Dong-yup served as the hosts for the ceremony, and an impressive lineup of stars from various tvN productions was expected. To emphasize its connection with loyal viewers, the selection of award nominees incorporated subjective recommendations and voting from the audience. The awards ceremony aimed to establish a unique 'tvN-like' atmosphere, departing from traditional award formats. Prior to these celebrations, a press conference was held on September 28 at the Stanford Hotel Seoul in Sangam-dong, Mapo-gu, Seoul. Attendees at the conference included Lee Deok-jae, CEO of CJ E&M's Media Contents Division, Lee Myung-han, General Manager, Kim Seok-hyeon, CP in charge of planning and production, and Producer Yoo Seong-mo.

In 2017, Lee organized a special event called the 'tvN Joy Exhibition 2017'. The event took place on November 11 and 12 at Blue Square NEMO in Hannam-dong. It featured a talk session and an exhibition centered around the theme of 'joy'. The exhibition showcased popular tvN content from that year. The talk session included appearances by famous creators and cast members from tvN's dramas and variety shows. The first talk session, held on the 11th, focused on the theme of 'Three Meals a Day & Daily Romantic Talk at Yoon's Kitchen', with producers Na Young-seok and Lee Jin-joo and surprise guests. The second talk session, titled 'tvN Scene Stealer Drama Talk', featured Park Hee-von from Argon, Um Hyo-sup from Secret Forest, and Lee Kyu-hyung from Secret Forest and Prison Playbook.

In 2018, Lee introduced a new entertainment broadcasting channel called XtvN. It was a rebranding of the cable channel XTM, owned by CJ ENM, targeting millennials born between the 1980s and the early 2000s. Several shows were organized for late-night airing on Fridays, Saturdays, and Sundays as part of the launch. These included Super Junior's variety show Super TV, the rapper's travel variety show Today's Swag, BoA's debut reality show Keyword #Boa, and a foreign variety show titled Can Love Be Translated? scheduled to be aired in February.

In January 2019, Lee took on the dual role as Head of CJ ENM's Media Contents Division and Head of Media Production Business, reaching new heights in his career. In August, according to CJ ENM's semi-annual report, Lee received a total compensation of 1.215 billion won, including a salary of 152 million won and a bonus of 1.063 billion won. The bonus consisted of various components such as special contribution money, long-term incentives, holiday bonuses, and other support funds, given in recognition of his contribution to the company's growth and profitability. In accordance with the executive rules and compensation committee resolution, the long-term incentives were based on business performance compared to targets, organizational payment ratio, and KPI evaluation.

=== Career in TVING ===
On March 12, 2021, TVING made an announcement regarding the appointment of Lee Myung-han as co-CEO of the company, alongside the then-current CEO Yang Ji-eul. CEO Yang Ji-eul assumed the responsibility of leading business operations and overseeing the expansion of TVING in international markets, while CEO Lee Myung-han was entrusted with managing investments and overseeing the production of original content. Both individuals shared their respective roles within the company.

During his tenure, Lee played a crucial role in driving the growth of TVING. He successfully introduced popular trends such as the entertainment series Transit Love and High School Mystery Club, as well as hit content like the drama series Work Later, Drink Now. Transit Love, a dating reality program, received widespread acclaim and even earned a nomination for the Best Entertainment award at the Baeksang Arts Awards, marking it as the first TVING original production to receive such recognition.

Under Lee's leadership, the number of paid subscribers more than tripled in the first year since TVING's launch, showcasing a remarkable growth rate of 206% as of October 2021. Particularly noteworthy was the significant expansion in the subscriber base among middle-aged viewers who were previously unfamiliar with the platform, with a growth rate of 176% among those in their 50s and 246% among those in their 60s. Additionally, there was a substantial increase of 231% in male subscribers who had relatively low interest initially. Lee also forged a significant partnership by signing a memorandum of understanding (MoU) with Hyundai Motor.

On May 2, 2022, TVING reported that Lee had recently expressed his intention to resign from his position. At that time, Lee had not yet submitted his official resignation letter and was engaged in discussions about potentially assuming a new role within CJ ENM. As a result, the exact timing of his resignation as the company's representative had not been established. However, it was later reported that he eventually resigned during the first half of the year.

=== Regroup in Egg is Coming ===
Lee Myung-han currently serves as CEO of Egg is Coming (에그이즈커밍), following his transfer with Na Yeong-seok and Shin Won-ho to the company in March 2023. Eggs is Coming was established by Lee Woo-jung and She appointed the CEO role to former producer of KBS and Monster Union Ko Jeong-seok. During the process of deciding the company name, Lee Woo-jung, Na Yeong-seok, and Shin Won-ho were involved, aiming to create a fun company name. Lee Woo-jung suggested, "Eggs are coming, how about that?" She had a reason for liking eggs but also mentioned how something that appears weak can be strong. They couldn't express this idea in Korean, so they ended up with 'Egg is coming' in English, which became '에그이즈커밍' in Korean. Their intention was to produce entertaining programs and have some fun with it.

Since 2018, Eggs is Coming has acted as an outsourcing company for program production directed by Na Yeong-seok and Shin Won-ho. By 2020, they had a team of 30 employees, including writers like Baek Sang-sook and Kim Ran-ju. Their initial project, Coffee Friends, was followed by the production of popular programs such as Korean Hostel in Spain, Kang's Kitchen (Seasons 2 and 3), Three Meals a Day (Mountain Village Edition, Fishing Village Edition Season 5), and Hospital Playlist. The YouTube channel Fifteen Nights was launched in May 2019 with a focus on embracing failure. It collaborates with CJ ENM and has produced various content including Rakinam, Mapo Hipster, Three Meals a Day, and Lee's Kitchen.

In April 2023, Eggs is Coming officially became a label under CJ ENM Studios, following the establishment of CJ ENM Studios as a wholly-owned subsidiary of CJ ENM, with Ha Yong-su as CEO. In 2022, CJ ENM announced its plan to consolidate its eight production house subsidiaries, including Eggs is Coming, under CJ ENM Studios. This involved acquiring any remaining shares to make each subsidiary wholly owned and merging them into CJ ENM Studios, while keeping their names as brands or labels. CJ ENM Studios aims to leverage the production capabilities of its subsidiaries to become a major production company. Drawing inspiration from the success of Studio Dragon, another CJ ENM production company, CJ ENM Studios aspires to create synergy and produce diverse content across different genres for global OTT platforms.

== Producing style ==
During their time at KBS, Lee established partnership with writer Lee Woo-jung, as well as Shin Won-ho and Na Young-seok. This collaborative team produced a string of highly successful shows, earning them the nickname of "Yeouido Research Institute," named after the KBS office's location in Yeouido. After transferring to CJ E&M, they became known as Lee Myung-han's Division. This notable migration of esteemed directors to cable channels was widely referred to as the "Great Migration 2011" by the press.

Lee produced successive hit dramas such as Reply Series, with Lee Woo-jung as writer and Shin Won-ho as director, which sparked a retro craze. Lee explained the success of two installments of Reply series with black swan theory. The series' production team, composed of variety show creators rather than traditional drama creators, was unfamiliar with the standard conventions of drama production. This lack of knowledge led them to integrate various entertainment formats and deviate from traditional methods, an unconventional approach that unexpectedly resonated with audiences and created a fresh and appealing product. Lee emphasizes the importance of breaking free from stereotypes and embracing challenges through convergence strategies. He suggests that by leveraging expertise in one field while exploring unfamiliar territory, one can create something transformative. This method, which he refers to as "genre destruction," "crossover," and "convergence," has the potential to bring about significant changes. Lee considers the Reply series a successful example of this approach.

In collaboration with Lee Woo-jung as the writer, Lee produced entertainment programs Three Meals a Day and Grandpas Over Flowers. Lee emphasized the significance of content creators transforming into recognized brands, as the success of their work relies on establishing trust and recognition among the audience. Lee said, "If you look at popular broadcasting contents, they have one thing in common: they are not programs belonging to one broadcasting station, but have become 'brands' that independently influence the public. For broadcast producers, it is difficult to be completely free from the quantitative indicator of viewership. However, in the future, the popularity of the program and the influence it has on the public will be the criteria for judging whether the content is successful or not."

== Filmography ==
=== Television shows ===
| Year | Title | | Network | Credited as | | Ref. |
| Year | English | Korean | Network | Director | Producer | Ref. |
|---|---|---|---|---|---|---|
| 1995 | Entertainment Weekly | 연예가 중계 | KBS2 | Assistant director | No | |
| 1996–1999 | Open Concert | 열린 음악회 | KBS2 | Assistant director | No | |
| 1999 | Animal Quiz Show | 퀴즈탐험 신비의 세계 | KBS2 | Yes | No | |
| 2001 | Declaration of Freedom Today is Saturday: Star Search Lookalike | 자유선언 토요대작전 : 스타서치 닮은 그대 | KBS2 | Yes | No | |
| 2001 | Declaration of Freedom Today is Saturday: My Love My Bride | 자유선언 토요대작전 : 나의 사랑 나의 신부 | KBS2 | Yes | No | |
| 2001–2003 | Declaration of Freedom Today is Saturday: Sanjang Meeting: The War Of Roses | 자유선언 토요대작전 : 산장미팅 장미의 전쟁 | KBS2 | Yes | No | |
| 2003 | Challenge! Housewife Popstar | 도전! 주부가요스타 | KBS2 | Yes | No | |
| 2004 | Star Golden Bell | 스타골든벨 | KBS2 | Yes | No | |
| 2004–2007 | Yoon Do-Hyun's Love Letter | 윤도현의 러브 레터 | KBS2 | Yes | No | |
| 2007 | Happy Sunday: Are You Ready? | 해피선데이 — 준비했어요 | KBS2 | Yes | Yes | |
| 2007–2012 | Happy Sunday: 2 Days 1 Night Season 1 | 1박 2일 | KBS2 | Yes | Yes | |
| 2012 | Sunday N tvN – The Romantic | 일요일N tvN – 더로맨틱 | tvN | Yes | Yes | |
| 2012 | Three Idiots Season 1 | 세 얼간이 | tvN | No | Yes | |
| 2012–2013 | Sunday N tvN – The Romantic & Idol | 일요일N tvN – 더로맨틱&아이돌 | tvN | No | Yes | |
| 2013 | Ha Jung-woo's Brothers | 하정우 부라더스 | tvN | No | Yes | |
| 2013–2018 | Grandpas Over Flowers (Season 1 – 5) | 꽃보다 할배 | tvN | No | Yes | |
| 2013–2014 | Sisters Over Flowers | 꽃보다 누나 | tvN | No | Yes | |
| 2014–2021 | Three Meals a Day (Season 1 – 10) | 삼시세끼 | tvN | No | Yes | |
| 2014–2018 | Youth Over Flowers (Season 1 – 5) | 꽃보다 청춘 | tvN | No | Yes | |
| 2016 | Let's Go to the Time Expedition | 렛츠고 시간탐험대 | tvN | No | Yes | |

=== Television series ===
| Year | Title | | Network | Credited as | | Director | Production House | Ref. |
| Year | English | Korean | Network | Producer | Creator | Director | Production House | Ref. |
|---|---|---|---|---|---|---|---|---|
| 2012 | Reply 1997 | 응답하라 1997 | tvN | Yes | No | Shin Won-ho | tvN | |
| 2013 | Reply 1994 | 응답하라 1994 | tvN | Yes | No | Shin Won-ho | tvN | |
| 2015–2016 | Reply 1988 | 응답하라 1988 | tvN | Yes | No | Shin Won-ho | tvN | |
| 2017 | Circle | 써클: 이어진 두 세계 | tvN | No | Yes | Min Jin-ki | tvN; Studio Dragon | |
| 2018–2019 | Memories of the Alhambra | 알함브라 궁전의 추억 | tvN | No | Yes | Ahn Gil-ho | tvN; Studio Dragon | |
| 2020 | Hospital Playlist | 슬기로운 의사생활 1 | tvN | Yes | No | Shin Won-ho | Egg is Coming | |
| 2022 | Hospital Playlist 2 | 슬기로운 의사생활 2 | tvN | Yes | No | Shin Won-ho | Egg is Coming | |
| 2021–2022 | Yumi's Cells | 유미의 세포들 | TVING | No | Yes | Lee Sang-yeob | Studio Dragon; Merrycow Creative; Studio N; Locus Corporation (Animation) | |

== Accolades ==
=== Awards and nominations ===
| Year | Ceremony | Category | Work | Result | Ref. |
|---|---|---|---|---|---|
| 2007 | KBS Entertainment Awards | Best Corner Award in Entertainment Show | 2 Days & 1 Night | Won | |
| 2008 | Korea Broadcasting Awards | Best Program Award in Entertainment & Entertainment | Happy Sunday | Won | |
| 2008 | KBS Entertainment Awards | Best Program Award chosen by viewers | Happy Sunday | Won | |
| 2008 | 15th Korea Entertainment Arts Awards | Best Program Award | Happy Sunday | Won | |
| 2009 | 21st Korean PD Awards | Best Production, TV Entertainment category | Happy Sunday | Won | |
| 2009 | 10th Broadcasting Award | Broadcast Production Division | Happy Sunday | Won | |

=== Listicles ===
Name of publisher, year listed, name of listicle, and placement
| Publisher | Year | Listicle | Placement | Ref. |
|---|---|---|---|---|
| Movie Week | 2008 | Movie Week's 50 Creative Entertainers | Top 50 | |
| The Herald Economy | 2012 | Pop Culture Power Leader Big 30 | 26th | |
| The Herald Economy | 2013 | Pop Culture Power Leader Big 30 | 15th | |
| The Herald Economy | 2014 | Pop Culture Power Leader Big 30 | 19th | |
| The Herald Economy | 2015 | Pop Culture Power Leader Big 30 | 26th (Note: with Baek Jong-won) | |

== See also ==
- Lee Woo-jung
- Na Yeong-seok
- Shin Won-ho
