= Lee Woo-jung =

South Korean television screenwriter

- 이우정
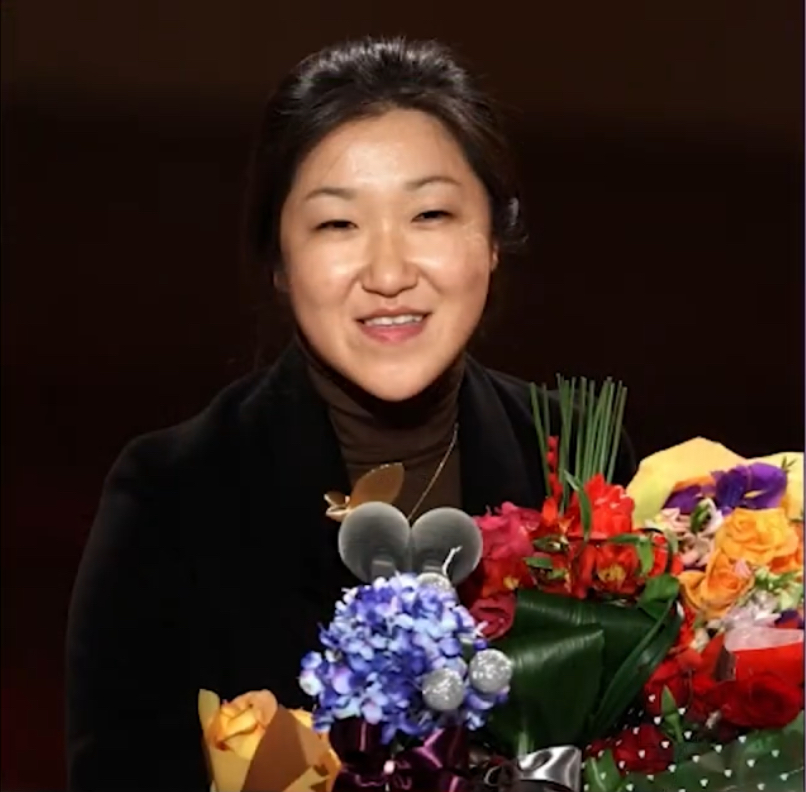
- Lee in 2008
- Born: 1976 (age 49–50); Jinju, South Gyeongsang Province, South Korea
- Education: Department of Trade Sookmyung Women's University
- Occupation: Television screenwriter
- Years active: 2000–present
- Employer(s): Egg Is Coming of CJ ENM Studio
- Organization(s): Korea Television and Radio Writers Association (KTRWA)

Korean name
- Hangul: 이우정
- Hanja: 李祐汀
- RR: I Ujeong
- MR: I Ujŏng

Lee Woo-jung (Korean: 이우정; born 1976) is a South Korean television screenwriter. She is best known for writing the tvN television dramas Reply series: Reply 1997 (2012), Reply 1994 (2013) and Reply 1988 (2015–2016). She also wrote the popular variety-reality shows 2 Days & 1 Night, Qualifications of Men, Grandpas Over Flowers, Sisters Over Flowers, Youth Over Flowers, and Three Meals a Day.

She was given a presidential commendation for her work on Grandpas Over Flowers at the 2013 Korea Content Awards, which praised her for its depiction of "four elderly backpackers with humor and warmth."

== Education ==
Lee Woo-jung was born on 1976, in Jinju, South Gyeongsang, South Korea. After graduating from the Department of Trade at Sookmyung Women's University, Lee began her career as an advertising copywriter. During her writer training at the MBC Academy, she made the transition to the broadcasting industry. At that time, becoming a broadcast writer required education from institutions affiliated with broadcasting companies, such as the MBC Academy or broadcasting writers' training institutes. Prospective writers would submit their resumes and portfolios with script composition plans, and broadcasting companies would request manpower from these institutions when they needed new writers.

In 2000, writer Lee participated in MBC's pilot program called An Outing with a Girlfriend! which was an entertainment survival program following the global trend of the time. Through this program, she gained experience and entered the broadcasting industry with 21st Century Committee.

== Career ==
=== Career as an unscripted show writer ===
After being scouted by KBS, Lee worked as assistant writer on music show Music Bank. In 2002, she became the main writer for the show "Declaration of Freedom Today is Saturday – The War Of Roses." This program was held at a mountain lodge and involved male entertainers and female college students meeting to find a mate. It was during this program that Lee met Lee Myung-han, the main director, along with two assistant directors, Na Yeong-seok and Shin Won-ho. Sharing similar creative tendencies, They quickly hit it off.

They eventually formed a group known as the Yeouido Research Institute, (Note: Yeouido Research Institute is a small group consisting of Lee Myung-han, Na Yeong-seok, Shin Won-ho, and writer Lee Woo-jung. They met as seniors and juniors in the entertainment department at KBS. The four of them collaborated at KBS and achieved great success by producing acclaimed programs like 'Man's Qualification' and '1 Night 2 Days'. Even after recently transitioning to CJ, they continue to achieve remarkable success with each program they produce, consistently hitting the jackpot.) which later became Lee Myung-han's division. They collaborated again on Super TV Sunday is Fun, with Lee Myung-han as the main director and his juniors in charge of directing each segment of the show. Na Yeong-seok directed "Let's Go! Dream Team – Season 1," and Shin Won-ho directed "Kung Kung Ta".

Lee returned as the main writer for Heroine 5, and collaborated with directors Lee Myung-han and Na Yeong-seok. Heroine 5 was one of the segments of Sunday 101%, which was renamed Happy Sunday since November 2004. It was broadcast from April 4, 2004, to May 1, 2005, on KBS 2. It was followed by the sequel, Heroine 6, which aired from May 8, 2005, to April 29, 2007, on KBS2. When Lee Myung-han and Na Yeong-seok developed other segments, Shin Won-hoo took over as the director of the show.

Lee, Lee Myung-han and Na Yeong-seok collaborated to create two new segments for Happy Sunday: High Five and Are You Ready? High Five aired on KBS 2TV from May 6, 2007, to May 18, 2008. Hosted by Jee Seok-jin, the show focused on five female stars as they embarked on different job experiences. From flight attendants to farmers, stuntwomen to police officers, the stars took on various roles. Given their diverse backgrounds, comedic twists and events were often incorporated into their training. The initial lineup of High Five included comedian Jo Hye-ryun, entertainer Hyun Young, singer Chae Yeon, MC Park Kyung-lim, and actress Kim Min-sun.

Happy Sunday: Are You Ready? aired from May 6, 2007, to July 29, 2007. Hosted by Kang Ho-dong, the cast included Lee Soo-geun, Eun Ji-won, Kim Jong-min, Noh Hong-chul, and Ji Sang-ryeol. The show revolved around the cast and special guests engaging in a variety of games. The initial episodes focused on games related to the Chinese language, while subsequent episodes featured physical and logic-based games. Unfortunately, due to poor ratings, Are You Ready? was discontinued after airing 12 episodes.

Following the discontinuation of Are You Ready? Lee, Lee Myung-han, and Na Yeong-seok, created a replacement segment titled 2 Days & 1 Night. The initial cast included most of the members from Are You Ready?, such as Kang Ho-dong, Lee Soo-geun, Eun Ji-won, Kim Jong-min, Noh Hong-chul, and Ji Sang-ryeol. Later, Kim C, Lee Seung-gi, MC Mong, and Uhm Tae-woong joined the cast. 2 Days & 1 Night revolutionized Korean reality programming by introducing the road trip format. The show featured a regular cast who embarked on trips to different towns across South Korea, spending one night and two days there. During these trips, they engaged in various activities such as games, camping, and sightseeing.

They achieved a breakthrough with 1 Night 2 Days. The show gained immense popularity and became the highest-rated variety program on KBS, captivating audiences nationwide. It achieved a peak viewership rating of 40%. The show not only had a positive impact on the featured locations by boosting tourism, but it also garnered a massive fan base for its cast members and even the production crew. Na Young-seok, in particular, gained significant recognition as he frequently appeared onscreen during interactions with the cast. As a result, he became a well-known figure among Korean audiences, affectionately referred to as "Na PD". Lee received the Writer Award at the 2008 KBS Entertainment Awards for her work on the show.

In December 2008, Lee stepped down from her role in the production of 2 Days & 1 Night. She then assumed the position of Happy Sunday's Team Leader (Producer). In 2009, Lee and creative producer Lee Myung-han collaborated on a new segment for Happy Sunday titled Qualifications of Men, with Shin Won-ho served as the director. This variety show aired on KBS2 from March 29, 2009, to April 7, 2013. Subtitled as "101 Things a Man Must Do Before He Dies", the show featured a group of male celebrities with diverse ages and personalities. They undertook missions aimed at helping them become "real men". These missions encompassed a wide range of challenges, both physical and emotional. Throughout the show, the participants met various mentors from different fields, learning valuable skills along the way.

On August 19, 2011, KBS officially announced that Happy Sunday – 1 Night 2 Days Season 1 will be ended after 6 months. It was announced 10 days since MC Kang Ho-dong's intention to get off from the show was announced. After the end of Season 1 of 2 Days & 1 Night, which broadcast its final episode on February 26, 2012. Writer Lee, left KBS to follow Lee Myung-han and Shin Won-ho, who left KBS to transfer to CJ E&M in July. Prior to that, during the 'tvN Foundation 5th Anniversary Conference' in October 2011, Director Song Chang-eui of tvN and Broadcasting Planning Director of CJ E&M Lee Deok-jae announced their 2012 program lineup and content production investment plan. One of the highlights of the lineup was a new concept reality program created by Lee Myung-han and writer Lee Woo-jung. The program was scheduled to air in the first half of the following year on tvN.

In early 2012, Lee made her debut on the cable channel tvN with the reality program called The Romantic. To create the show, Lee sought the assistance of director Yoo Hak-chan, and junior writer Kim Dae-joo, who were former crew members from 2 Days & 1 Night. The 12-episode show introduced a unique concept of a dating game show. Ten ordinary young men and women embarked on a journey to unfamiliar locations, gradually getting to know each other and seeking true love. The filming took place in Dubrovnik, Croatia, spanning over a period of 9 nights and 10 days from late December to early January. Dubrovnik, renowned as the pearl of the Adriatic Sea for its breathtaking location in the Balkans, is a popular honeymoon destination for Europeans. It has also gained recognition as a filming location for a coffee commercial featuring actress Go Hyun-jung. The Romantic premiered on tvN at 11:00 pm on a Saturday in February 2012.

In the same year, Lee once again collaborated with Lee Myung-han, director Yoo Hak-chan, and junior writer Kim Dae-joo for her second reality programming pilot Three Idiots Season 1. Jun Hyun-moo took on the role of the host, and the cast included Lee Soo-geun, Kim Jong-min, and Eun Ji-won. All cast members, except Jun Hyun-moo, were original members of Season 1 of 2 Days & 1 Night. The show premiered on tvN on October 7, 2012, marking the first time a weekend entertainment program in Korea was broadcast live. Starting from November 11, 2012, Three Idiots became a segment of 'Sunday N tvN,' a 135-minute program that featured two segments within a framed composition. During the live broadcasts of Three Idiots, a pre-recorded program titled The Romantic and Idol was also aired.

The Yeouido Research Institute was in full force after Na Yeong-seok moved to CJ ENM in early 2013. Together with Na Yeong-seok, Lee made Grandpas Over Flowers, a travel-reality show that featured four veteran actors in their seventies: Lee Soon-jae, Shin Goo, Park Geun-hyung and Baek Il-seob. Alongside them, actor Lee Seo-jin in his forties joined as their porter for their backpacking tours to various international destination. The show's title is a word play/parody of the popular Japanese manga of Boys Over Flowers (花より男子, Hana Yori Dango), and also references the 2009 South Korea drama adaptation of the manga. The first season of Grandpas Over Flowers aired from July 5 to August 16, 2013, on tvN, consisting of seven episodes. It was filmed in Paris, Strasbourg, Bern, and Lucerne. The success of the first season led to the immediate airing of the second season from August 23 to September 20, 2013, comprising five episodes that were filmed in Taiwan. Lee as writer received Presidential Commendation for this work.

"Lee Woo-jung has a keen eye for observing people. She quickly figures out someone's personality and what they like. Nowadays, storytelling is crucial in variety shows. Instead of having a script, they create an improvisational storytelling platform on-site and later structure the story. She is capable of understanding the hidden psychology behind events and has excellent talent in capturing context and flow." - Jeong Deok-hyeon, a popular culture critic.

Na Yeong-seok has often praised writer Lee for her ability to create engaging content that speaks to the heart of people's lives. "When you talk about people's lives with writer Lee, junior writers, and junior PDs, it naturally develops into a broadcasting item," he said at production presentations and lectures. "This writer is the creator who has the greatest influence and stimulation on me." Na Yeong-seok also praised Lee Woo-jung's personality, saying, "Usually, when writers become well-known, they tend to become arrogant. However, Lee Woo-jung still listens to people's stories, asks questions, and strives to broaden her horizons."

Following that, Lee collaborated with Yoo Hak-chan on Ha Jung-woo Brothers, a reality road talk show that followed actor Ha Jung-woo and his close friends, including actors Jung Kyung-ho, Kang Shin-cheol, and Ko Sung-hee, on a two-day impromptu trip. The show's premise involved escaping the city and traveling with a limited budget of 200,000 won. The production team used candid cameras and minimal intervention, allowing the natural interactions and experiences of the cast to unfold. It was broadcast on tvN on October 11, 2013.

Lee and Na Young-seok also produced the first spin-off of Grandpas Over Flowers, titled Sisters Over Flowers. It aired between the second and third seasons of Grandpas Over Flowers and showcased the adventures of four middle-aged actresses: Youn Yuh-jung, Kim Ja-ok, Kim Hee-ae, and Lee Mi-yeon. Accompanying them on their journey to Croatia was the 27-year-old singer-actor Lee Seung-gi. It was broadcast on tvN from November 29, 2013, to January 17, 2014.

Lee acted as main writer the production of various shows. One notable production was Grandpas Over Flowers Season 3, which was filmed in Spain. Following that, its second spin-off called Youth Over Flowers was created. With a younger cast, Na Young-seok pushed the backpacking concept to the extreme by informing the cast about the trip only few hours before their flight, resulting in them traveling without any luggage. The first and second seasons featured a cast composed of three singer-songwriters in their forties (Yoon Sang, You Hee-yeol and Lee Juck) and three actors in their twenties and thirties (three actors from Reply 1994, Yoo Yeon-seok, Son Ho-jun and Baro), who went to Peru and Laos, respectively.

This was followed by Three Meals a Day: Jeongseon Village, where Lee starred alongside his former co-star from drama series Wonderful Days, Ok Taecyeon. It was a show that originated from a joke during the filming of Grandpas Over Flowers, "Cooking King Seo-jinnie," a fake cooking show that joke about Lee Seo-jin's lack of cooking skill. The show revolved around two men preparing meals using ingredients they grew themselves in a rural village. Despite their city backgrounds, they struggled with tasks like cultivating a vegetable garden and tending to farm animals. This led to comical situations as they tried to feed themselves and their celebrity guests. In the second season, a third cast member, Kim Kwang-kyu and added a four-month project showcasing the entire process of food cultivation. The cast members were prohibited from grocery shopping to emphasize the challenges of sourcing ingredients from nature. The show aimed to highlight the difficulty of obtaining materials for daily meals, which are readily available in supermarkets.

Grandpas Over Flowers Season 4 was filmed with Choi Ji-woo joining as Lee Seo-jin's assistant. Choi had appeared in Lee's previous show, "Three Meals a Day." In the fourth season, the program set its new destination as Greece, which the four grandpas chose over Cuba. The cast is set to return to Korea on February 25. It aired on tvN from March 27 to May 8, 2015.

On July 16, 2015, the first web entertainment show written by Lee and directed by Na Yeong-seok's show New Journey to the West, was announced. It was the first project from "tvN Go", a digital-content brand from the cable channel tvN. The concept was a 'Travel Real Variety.' The initial idea came from one of the original members, Lee Seung-gi, who want to travel with former 2 Days & 1 Night members and film all of their activities. It was unprecedented for a variety show to be distributed solely through online streaming (on the web portals Naver TV Cast and QQ).

The show's first season reunited the former 2 Days & 1 Night Season 1 members Lee Seung-gi, Kang Ho-dong, Eun Ji-won and Lee Soo-geun. Each of the four members portrayed a character from the classic 16th-century Chinese novel Journey to the West. They embarked on a 5-day and 4-night backpacking trip through Xi'an, once the capital of China during the Tang dynasty. The show was a success, garnering over 42 million views on Naver TV Cast and 10 million views on Chinese portal site QQ.

=== Career as drama writer and creator ===
In 2011, Lee made her debut as a drama writer in Reply 1997, despite having no prior experience in drama writing. Director Shin Won-ho gave her the opportunity. The drama held great significance for Shin Won-ho as his first work at CJ E&M after transferring from KBS the previous year. Initially focused on reality programming, Shin had no plans to direct dramas. However, the director of tvN, Song Chang-eui, suggested that Shin direct a drama and promised to pair him with a talented drama writer. Shin had concerns about working with an established writer, but agreed to the project under the condition of creating a fresh version and experimenting with it. Director Song Chang-eui eventually agreed, and a production team, including Lee Woo-jung and other entertainment writers, was formed. In April 2012, tvN announced that the drama Reply 1997, with Lee Myung-han as the executive producer, Shin Won-ho as the director, and Lee Woo-jung as the scriptwriter, would air in June. However, due to a one-month delay, Reply 1997 premiered on July 24, 2012, as tvN's first self-produced drama.

Reply 1997 revolves around six friends from Busan. The story timeline shifts between their past as high school in 1997 and their present reunion in 2012, where a couple gets engaged. The show explores the growing popularity of fan culture in the 1990s with K-pop groups like H.O.T. and Sechs Kies. The setting brings back nostalgic feelings, and the love triangle of Seong Si-won (Jung Eun-ji), Yoon Yoon-jae (Seo In-guk), and Yoon Tae-woong (Song Jong-ho), with the "guess who's the husband" concept, makes the viewers intrigued.

One interesting thing about Reply 1997 is how it accurately depicts the IMF crisis and the political situation of that time. The actors did a great job, using different dialects and humor, which contributed to the show's success. Being a cable drama, it had the freedom to present a detailed and realistic portrayal of the era, while also having an exciting romantic storyline. The performances by the casts were highly praised. Reply 1997 initially attracted viewers in their 30s, but quickly gained popularity among a wider age range, including people in their 50s. Positive word-of-mouth reviews praised its entertaining and relatable qualities. The drama's storytelling approach with memory, nostalgia, and retro elements appealed to different generations, making it popular and resonating with a diverse audience. Additionally, the success of Reply 1997 sparked a revival of 1990s popular culture and a retro craze.

In April 2013, tvN announced the second installment of the Reply series: Reply 1994. Despite having the same writer, director, and producer as Reply 1997, is not a prequel. It maintains the concept of a coming-of-age drama with 1990s nostalgia but introduces a completely new plot and characters. Initially, writer Lee Woo-jung and director Shin Won-ho planned to set the first Reply series in 1994, the year they were college freshmen. However, after casting Eun Ji-won from Sechs Kies, they changed the year to 1997. This decision was influenced by the peak popularity of H.O.T. and Sechs Kies fandoms in 1997, which created an interesting contrast to the struggling Korean economy during the IMF crisis. Feeling that they had enough material for another series, Lee and Shin returned to their original plan and created Reply 1994.

Reply 1994 (2013) depicts the lives of college students hailing from various provinces who share a boarding house in Seoul. The drama features a talented ensemble cast including Go Ara, Jung Woo, Yoo Yeon-seok, Kim Sung-kyun, Son Ho-jun, Baro, Min Do-hee, Sung Dong-il, and Lee Il-hwa. The drama garnered exceptional success, reaching a record-breaking viewership rating of 14.3%, the highest in the history of cable dramas. Lee and Shin Won-ho, gained a lot of attention because of this success.

In October 2015, Lee Myung-han, the director of tvN, announced a lineup of dramas to celebrate tvN's 10th anniversary, which began in November with the highly anticipated third installment of the Reply series called Reply 1988. The drama features a talented ensemble cast including Lee Hye-ri, Ryu Jun-yeol, Go Kyung-pyo, Park Bo-gum, and Lee Dong-hwi. Set in the year 1988, the story revolves around five friends and their families who live in the same neighborhood called Ssangmun-dong, Dobong District, Northern Seoul. The drama aired every Friday and Saturday from November 6, 2015, to January 16, 2016, on tvN, totaling 20 episodes. It received both critical acclaim and popularity among viewers, with its final episode achieving an 18.8% nationwide audience share, making it the sixth highest rated drama in Korean cable television history and highest rated television drama at the time of airing.

Reply series, Reply 1997 (2012), Reply 1994 (2013), and Reply 1988 (2016), were all successful in terms of viewership and popularity, despite the challenging Korean climate for seasonal dramas. The fact that "even a single line of dialogue was meticulously crafted through collaborative meetings" sheds light on why the series garnered an exceptional response. This collaborative effort between Shin Won-ho and Lee, led by producer Lee Myung-han, contributed to Lee's rise as a renowned writer. Lee Myung-Han further explained the success of the Reply series with black swan theory.

The critic Jeong Deok-hyeon attributed the success of Lee Woo-jung's dramas to her experience of attempting various things in variety shows. With the boundaries between variety shows, dramas, documentaries, and current affairs programs becoming blurred, the grammar of dramas has also changed significantly. Above all, there is an increasing number of dramas that expand empathy based on viewers' reactions. Lee Woo-jung, who has experience in hosting variety programs, perfectly fits the current trend. In the case of the Reply series, for example, they first decide on a theme for each episode and multiple writers gather to generate episodes. They then select the best ones from the pool, which allows them to break free from the constraints of the traditional "this is how a drama should be" framework. With her ability to empathize, flexible thinking, quick wit, and compatible colleagues, Lee Woo-jung was able to create the most popular TV programs of the year.

In May 2016, Lee and Shin Won-ho started planning for black comedy drama Prison Playbook. She served as creator, the writer was junior writer from Reply Series, Jeong Bo-hoon. The drama depicts the story of superstar baseball player Kim Je-hyeok, who became a criminal overnight and thrown to prison, and the lives of the people living in prison with him. The series was a commercial hit and became one of the highest-rated series in Korean cable television history.

Lee returned to the drama scene with the television series Hospital Playlist. It is the second installment of the Wise Life series, following Prison Playbook (2017–18). Lee, who has partnered with Shin Won-ho on all her previous dramas for tvN, has once again joined forces with the director. They have also reunited with two actors from their past dramas, Jung Kyung-ho from Prison Playbook, and Yoo Yeon-seok from Reply 1994. The series also features Jo Jung-suk, Kim Dae-myung, and Jeon Mi-do.

The first season of the show was broadcast on tvN every Thursday from March 12 to May 28, 2020. Following their television airing, each episode was made available on Netflix in South Korea, Asia-Pacific, Latin America and English-speaking countries. (Note: For Japan and rest of the world, all episodes (season 1) were launched at once on April 6, 2020.) By the end of the first season, it had achieved the status of being the ninth highest-rated Korean drama in cable television history at the time. The second season was aired from June 17 and September 16, 2021. According to Nielsen Korea, the first episode garnered 10.007% viewership, setting a network record for the highest premiere ratings.

=== Establishment of Egg is Coming and content production ===
In the summer of 2018, Lee established the production company Egg is Coming (에그이즈커밍). The name was developed alongside directors Na Yeong-seok and Shin Won-ho. were also involved, aiming to create a fun company name. Lee proposed "Egg is Coming" to symbolize hidden strength in something seemingly fragile. Finding no suitable Korean equivalent for this concept, they adopted the English name. The company was founded with the goal of producing engaging, entertaining content. Later, they appointed former KBS and Monster Union producer Ko Jeong-seok as CEO.

Since its establishment, Egg is Coming acts as outsourcing company for program production directed by Na Yeong-seok and Shin Won-ho, in collaboration with CJ ENM. By 2020, they had a team of 30 employees, including talented writers like Baek Sang-sook and Kim Ran-ju. Their initial project, Coffee Friends, was followed by the production of popular programs such as Korean Hostel in Spain, Kang's Kitchen (Seasons 2 and 3), Three Meals a Day (Mountain Village Edition, Fishing Village Edition Season 5), and Hospital Playlist. The YouTube channel Fifteen Nights was launched in May 2019 with a focus on embracing failure. It collaborates with CJ ENM and has produced various content including 'Rakinam', 'Mapo Hipster', 'Three Meals for Four', and 'Lee's Kitchen Alone'.

In 2022, the company was acquired by CJ ENM. CJ ENM announced its plan to consolidate its eight production house subsidiaries, including Egg is Coming, under the umbrella of CJ ENM Studios. This involved acquiring any remaining shares to make each subsidiary wholly owned and merging them into CJ ENM Studios, while keeping their names as brands or labels. CJ ENM Studios aims to leverage the production capabilities of its subsidiaries to become a major production company. Drawing inspiration from the success of Studio Dragon, another CJ ENM production company, CJ ENM Studios aspires to create synergy and produce diverse content across different genres for global OTT platforms.

Lee Myung-han currently serves as CEO of Egg is Coming, following his transfer with Na Yeong-seok and Shin Won-ho to the company in March 2023. In April 2023, Egg is Coming officially became a label under CJ ENM Studios, following the establishment of CJ ENM Studios as a wholly owned subsidiary of CJ ENM, with Ha Yong-su as CEO.

== Filmography ==
=== Television shows ===
Year	Title		Network	Credited as		Ref.
Year	English	Korean	Network	Assistant Writer	Main Writer	Ref.
2000	An Outing with a Girlfriend!		MBC	Yes	No	
2000	21st Century Committee	섹션TV 연예통신	MBC	Yes	No	
2000	Music Bank	뮤직뱅크	KBS2	Yes	No	
2001–2003	Declaration of Freedom Today is Saturday – The War Of Roses	자유선언 토요대작전 – 산장미팅 장미의 전쟁	KBS2	No	Yes	
2001–2003	Super TV Sunday is Fun — Let's Go! Dream Team – Season 1	슈퍼 TV 일요일은 즐거워 — 출발드림팀 시즌1	KBS2	No	Yes	
2004–2005	Happy Sunday: Heroine 5 (Note: The show originally aired from April 4, 2004 to May 1, 2005)	여걸파이브	KBS2	No	Yes	
2005–2007	Happy Sunday: Heroine 6 (Note: The show originally aired from May 8, 2005 to April 29, 2007)	여걸식스	KBS2	No	Yes	
2007–2008	Happy Sunday: High-Five	하이파이브	KBS2	No	Yes	
2007	Happy Sunday: Are You Ready? (Note: The program originally aired on May 6, 2007 and ended on July 29, 2007)	해피선데이 — 준비했어요	KBS2	No	Yes	
2007–2012	Happy Sunday: 2 Days 1 Night Season 1 (Note: Season 1 premiered on August 5, 2007 and ended on February 26, 2012)	1박 2일	KBS2	No	Yes	
2012	Happy Sunday: The Human Condition (Pilot episode)	남자의 자격	KBS2	No	Yes	
2012	Sunday N tvN – The Romantic	일요일N tvN – 더로맨틱	tvN	No	Yes	
2012	Three Idiots Season 1	세 얼간이	tvN	No	Yes	
2012–2013	Sunday N tvN – The Romantic & Idol	일요일N tvN – 더로맨틱&아이돌	tvN	No	Yes	
2013	Ha Jung-woo's Brothers	하정우 부라더스	tvN	No	Yes	
2013–2018	Grandpas Over Flowers (Season 1–5)	꽃보다 할배	tvN	No	Yes	
2013–2014	Sisters Over Flowers	꽃보다 누나	tvN	No	Yes	
2014–2018	Youth Over Flowers (Season 1–5)	꽃보다 청춘	tvN	No	Yes	
2014–2021	Three Meals a Day (Season 1–10)	삼시세끼	tvN	No	Yes	
2015–2020	New Journey to the West (Season 1–8)	신서유기	Naver TV Cast, tvN	No	Yes	
2017	Newlywed Diaries (Season 1–2)	신혼일기	tvN	No	Yes	
2017–2018	The Dictionary Of Useless Knowledge (Season 1–3)	알아두면 쓸데없는 신비한 잡학사전	tvN	No	Yes	
2017–2018	Youn's Kitchen (Season 1–2)	윤식당	tvN	No	Yes	
2017–2019	Kang's Kitchen (Season 1–3)	강식당	tvN	No	Yes	
2018	Little Cabin in the Woods	숲속의 작은 집 만들기	tvN	No	Yes	
2019	Coffee Friends	커피프렌즈	tvN	No	Yes	
2019	Korean Hostel in Spain	스페인 하숙	tvN	No	Yes	
2019	Three Meals a Day in Iceland	삼시세끼 – 아이슬란드 간 세끼	tvN	No	Yes	
2019–2020	The Ramyeonator	라끼남: 라면 끼리는 남자	tvN	No	Yes	
2020	Friday Joy Package	금요일 금요일 밤에	tvN	No	Yes	
2020	Mapo Hipster	마포 멋쟁이	tvN	No	Yes	
2020	Three Meals for Four	삼시네세끼	tvN	No	Yes	
2020	Summer Vacation	여름방학	tvN	No	Yes	
2020	Lee's Kitchen	나홀로 이식당	tvN	No	Yes	
2020–present	Things That Make Me Groove	내 어깨를 봐 탈골됐잖아	tvN	No	Yes	
2021	Youn's Stay	윤스테이	tvN	No	Yes	
2021	Don't Look Back	뒤돌아보지 말아요 만들기	tvN	No	Yes	
2021	The Devils Wear Jung Nam (Season 1–2)	악마는 정남이를 입는다	tvN	No	Yes	
2021	Hospital Playlist Goes Camping	슬기로운 캠핑생활	tvN	No	Yes	
2021	Athletic Genius Ahn Jae Hyun	운동천재 안재현	tvN	No	Yes	
2021	Spring Camp	신서유기 스페셜 스프링 캠프	TVING	No	Yes	
2021–present	The Game Caterers	출장 십오야	tvN	No	Yes	
2022	Unexpected Journey	뜻밖의 여정	tvN	No	Yes	
2022	Earth Arcade (Season 1–2)	뿅뿅 지구오락실	tvN	No	Yes	
2023	Jinny's Kitchen	서진이네	tvN	No	Yes	

=== Television series ===
Year	Title		Network	Credited as		Ref.
Year	English	Korean	Network	Creator	Writer	Ref.
2012	Reply 1997	응답하라 1997	tvN	No	Yes	
2013	Reply 1994	응답하라 1994	tvN	No	Yes	
2015–2016	Reply 1988	응답하라 1988	tvN	No	Yes	
2017	Prison Playbook	슬기로운 감빵생활	tvN	Yes	No	
2020–2021	Hospital Playlist (season 1–2)	슬기로운 의사생활	tvN	No	Yes	
2025	Resident Playbook	언젠가는 슬기로울 전공의생활	tvN	Yes	No	

== Accolades ==
=== Awards and nominations ===
List of award
Award ceremony	Year	Category	Recipient	Result	Ref.
Asia Contents Awards	2020	Best Writer	Hospital Playlist	Nominated	
49th Baeksang Arts Awards	2013	Best Screenplay – Television	Reply 1997	Nominated	
52nd Baeksang Arts Awards	2016	Best Screenplay – Television	Reply 1988	Nominated	
56th Baeksang Arts Awards	2020	Best Screenplay – Television	Hospital Playlist	Nominated	
KBS Entertainment Awards	2008	Best Variety Show Writer	2 Days & 1 Night	Won	
23th Korean Broadcasting Writers Awards	2010	Best Variety Show Writer	Happy Sunday – Qualifications of Men	Won	

=== State honors ===
State honor
Country	Award Ceremony	Year	Honor	Ref.
South Korea	4th Korean Content Awards (Note: Honors are given at the Korean Content Awards (대한민국 콘텐츠 대상) arranged by the Korea Creative Content Agency and hosted by the Ministry of Culture, Sports and Tourism. The 2022 Korea Content Awards Ceremony, which started in 2009 and celebrated its 14th this year, aims to inspire pride in the content industry and develop the Korean cultural content industry by discovering and awarding contributors and excellent content that have contributed to the development of the content industry in 2022. It is a place to promote. The winners (works) of honor, which are recommended through the website of the Korea Creative Content Agency (www.kocca.kr) and announced through careful examination by experts and three-step verification, play a leading role in shining the Korean content industry in the world.)	2013	Presidential's Commendation for Grandpas Over Flowers	
South Korea	12th Korean Content Awards	2020	Minister of Culture, Sports and Tourism Commendation for Contribution to the development of the broadcasting and video industry for Hospital Playlist	

=== Listicles ===
Name of publisher, year listed, name of listicle, and placement
Publisher	Year	Listicle	Placement	Ref.
Herald Economy	2013	Pop Culture Power Leader Big 30	25th	
Herald Economy	2015	Pop Culture Power Leader Big 30	24th (Note: Draw with Choi Min-shik)	

== See also ==
- Lee Myung-han
- Na Yeong-seok
- Shin Won-ho
