= Lee Young-ja =

South Korean comedian

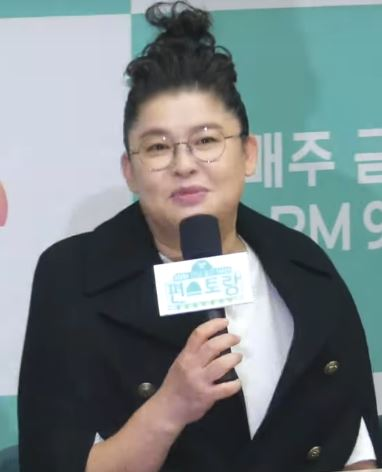
- Born: August 15, 1967 (age 59); Asan, South Chungcheong Province, South Korea

Comedy career
- Years active: 1991–present
- Medium: Stand-up, television
- Genres: Observational, Sketch, Wit, Parody, Slapstick, Dramatic, Sitcom

Korean name
- Hangul: 이유미
- Hanja: 李有美
- RR: I Yumi
- MR: I Yumi

Stage name
- Hangul: 이영자
- RR: I Yeongja
- MR: I Yŏngja

Lee Yoo-mi (Korean: 이유미; born August 15, 1967), better known by her stage name Lee Young-ja (Korean: 이영자) is a South Korean comedian and television presenter. She is signed with iOK Company as her agency.

== Career ==
Lee made her debut in the South Korean entertainment industry in 1991, after successfully winning MBC's comedy competition.

== Ambassadorship ==
In 2010, Lee became an ambassador for the World Disaster Relief Organization after going to Haiti on her talk show, Live Talk Show Taxi, and volunteering during the 2010 Haiti earthquake.

== Filmography ==
=== Variety shows ===
| Year | Title | Role | Notes/Ref. |
|---|---|---|---|
| 1991 | Youth March | Cast member | |
| 1992 | If You Laugh, Blessings Will Come Your Way | Cast member | |
| 1992 | Today is a Good Day | Cast member | |
| 1992–1993 | Sunday Night | Cast member | 영자의방, 댄싱 히어로, 일요매거진, 일요스타앨범 |
| 1993 | 특종 TV연예 | With Kim Won-jun and Choi Jin-young | |
| 1994 | Good Saturday | Host | |
| 1994 | Star and Tonight (스타와 이밤을) | | |
| 1995 | Super Sunday | Host | 톱스타 인생극장, 금촌댁네 사람들 |
| 1996 | My Father (친정아버지) | | |
| 1996 | Moonlight Sonata (달빛 소나타) | | |
| 1999 | Super TV Sunday is Fun | Host | |
| 1999 | Family Entertainment | Contestant with Jung Hye-sun and Hong Jin-kyung | Episode 745 |
| 2005 | Find a Happy World | Host | |
| 2007 | Squeeze | Host | Season 1 |
| 2007–2012 | Live Talk Show Taxi | Host | |
| 2008 | People Looking for a Laugh | Cast member | |
| 2010–2019 | Hello Counselor | Co-host with Shin Dong-yeop and Cultwo | |
| 2012 | Invincible Youth 2 | Host | |
| 2012 | Blind Test 180° | Contestant | Chuseok special |
| 2012–2013 | 100 Dancing Golden Microphones (춤추는 100인의 황금 마이크) | Host | |
| 2013–2014 | Mamma Mia | Host | |
| 2014–2015 | Good Eating, Good Living - Did You Eat? | Host | |
| 2014–2017 | Live Talk Show Taxi | Host | |
| 2015 | Golden Wagon | Host | |
| 2015 | Serial Shopping Family | Host | |
| 2016 | Eating Show Star (먹스타 총출동) | Host | |
| 2018–present | Omniscient Interfering View | Cast member | |
| 2018–present | Food Bless You | Cast member | |
| 2018–present | Lanlife | Host | |
| 2019–2022 | Stars' Top Recipe at Fun-Staurant | Cast member | |
| 2021–2022 | I'm here to make money | Host with Jason | Season 1–2 |
| 2021 | War of the Sword | Host | with Lee Chan-won and Do Kyung-wan |
| 2022 | The House Detox | Host | Season 2 |

=== Web series ===
| Year | Title | Notes |
|---|---|---|
| 2020 | K-Bob Star | Host (with Kim Sook) |

=== Television series ===
| Year | Title | Role | Notes |
|---|---|---|---|
| 1995 | Jazz | | |
| 1998 | Will Make You Happy | Lee Young-ja | |
| 2006 | Love Truly | Song Eon-joo (cook, 39y/o) | Supporting character |
| 2008 | Last Scandal | Min-joo's mother | Supporting character |
| 2015 | The Producers | Herself | Special appearance/cameo in episode 3 with Shin Dong-yeop and Cultwo |
| 2017 | The Package | Woman in airport | Cameo |

=== Films ===
| Year | Title | Role | Notes |
|---|---|---|---|
| 1992 | Don't Cry, Young-ja | | |
| 1992 | I Love You, Young-ja | | |
| 1999 | Ghost in Love | Deity | |
| 2004 | Don't Tell Papa | Gong Sun-mi | Supporting character |

== Accolades ==
=== Awards and nominations ===
| Year | Award | Category | Nominated work | Result | Ref. |
|---|---|---|---|---|---|
| 1993 | 29th Baeksang Arts Awards | Best Variety Performer – Female | | Won | |
| 1996 | 23rd Korean Broadcasting Awards | Comedian Award | | Won | |
| 1996 | 3rd Korean Entertainment Arts Awards | Comedian Award | | Won | |
| 2010 | SBS Entertainment Awards | SBS 20th Anniversary Entertainment 10 Star Award | | Won | |
| 2011 | 10th KBS Entertainment Awards | Top Excellence Award (Variety) | | Won | |
| 2012 | 11th KBS Entertainment Awards | Top Excellence Award (Variety) | Hello Counselor, Invincible Youth Season 2 | Won | |
| 2014 | Asia Rainbow TV Awards | Best Entertainment Hostess | Hello Counselor | Won | |
| 2015 | 51st Baeksang Arts Awards | Best Variety Performer – Female | Hello Counselor | Nominated | |
| 2016 | tvN10 Awards | Perfect Attendance Award in Variety | Live Talk Show Taxi | Won | |
| 2016 | tvN10 Awards | Best MC | Live Talk Show Taxi | Nominated | |
| 2016 | 15th KBS Entertainment Awards | Top Excellence Award (Talk Show) | Hello Counselor | Nominated | |
| 2018 | 16th KBS Entertainment Awards | Grand Prize (Daesang) | Hello Counselor | Won | |
| 2018 | 18th MBC Entertainment Awards | Grand Prize (Daesang) | Omniscient Interfering View | Won | |
| 2018 | 18th MBC Entertainment Awards | Entertainer of the Year Award | Omniscient Interfering View | Won | |
| 2018 | 18th MBC Entertainment Awards | Best Couple Award (with manager Song Sung-ho) | Omniscient Interfering View | Nominated | |
| 2019 | 55th Baeksang Arts Awards | Best Variety Performer – Female | Omniscient Interfering View | Won | |
| 2019 | 17th KBS Entertainment Awards | Best Couple Award with Lee Kyung-kyu | Stars' Top Recipe at Fun-Staurant | Won | |
| 2019 | 19th MBC Entertainment Awards | Grand Prize (Daesang) | Omniscient Interfering View | Nominated | |
| 2019 | 19th MBC Entertainment Awards | Entertainer of the Year | Omniscient Interfering View | Won | |
| 2020 | 18th KBS Entertainment Awards | Producers' Special Award | Stars' Top Recipe at Fun-Staurant | Won | |
| 2020 | 18th KBS Entertainment Awards | Top Excellence Award in Reality Category | Stars' Top Recipe at Fun-Staurant | Nominated | |
| 2020 | 20th MBC Entertainment Awards | Grand Prize (Daesang) | Omniscient Interfering View | Nominated | |
| 2020 | 20th MBC Entertainment Awards | Best Couple Award with Jun Hyun-moo | Omniscient Interfering View | Nominated | |
| 2021 | 19th KBS Entertainment Awards | Top Excellence Award in Reality Category | Stars' Top Recipe at Fun-Staurant | Nominated | |
| 2021 | 21st MBC Entertainment Awards | Entertainer of the Year | Omniscient Interfering View | Won | |
| 2022 | 2022 MBC Entertainment Awards | Entertainer of the Year | Omniscient Interfering View | Won | |
| 2022 | 2022 MBC Entertainment Awards | Best Couple Award with Jun Hyun-moo | Omniscient Interfering View | Nominated | |

=== Listicles ===
Name of publisher, year listed, name of listicle, and placement
| Publisher | Year | Listicle | Placement | Ref. |
|---|---|---|---|---|
| Forbes | 2019 | Korea Power Celebrity 40 | 33rd | |
