= Grandpas Over Flowers =

South Korean travel-reality show

- Also known as: Grandfathers Over Flowers; Halbae Over Flowers
- Hangul: 꽃보다 할배
- Hanja: 花樣爺爺
- RR: Kkotboda halbae
- MR: Kkotpoda halbae
- Genre: Variety show
- Written by: Lee Woo-jung; Lee Eon-joo; Kim Jeong-mi; Park Shin-hye; Choi Eun-sol; Lee Da-som
- Directed by: Na Young-seok; Park Hee-yeon; Jang Eun-jeong
- Starring: Lee Soon-jae; Shin Goo; Park Geun-hyung; Baek Il-seob; Lee Seo-jin; Kim Yong-gun (season 5)
- Country of origin: South Korea
- Original language: Korean
- No. of seasons: 5
- No. of episodes: 38

Production
- Executive producer: Lee Myung-han
- Production locations: Seoul; France; Switzerland; Taiwan; Spain; Portugal; UAE; Greece; Germany; Czech Republic; Austria
- Running time: 70 minutes

Original release
- Network: tvN
- Release: July 5, 2013 – August 24, 2018

Related
- Sisters Over Flowers; Youth Over Flowers

Grandpas Over Flowers (Korean: 꽃보다 할배; RR: Kkotboda halbae) is a South Korean travel-reality show that airs on tvN. The title is a word play/parody of Boys Over Flowers (花より男子, Hana Yori Dango), a popular Japanese manga about four handsome young men (Boys Over Flowers also refers to the 2009 adaptation of the manga from South Korea).

The series stars four veteran actors in their seventies — Lee Soon-jae, Shin Goo, Park Geun-hyung and Baek Il-seob — as they go on a backpacking tour to overseas travel destinations alongside Lee Seo-jin, an actor in his forties.

Grandpas Over Flowers became a cultural phenomenon, receiving high ratings for a Korean cable program and spawning several spin-offs and remakes.

== Cast ==
Name	Seasons					Ref.
Lee Soon-jae	1	2	3	4	5	
Shin Goo	1	2	3	4	5	
Park Geun-hyung	1	2	3	4	5	
Baek Il-seob	1	2	3	4	5	
Kim Yong-gun					5	
Lee Seo-jin	1	2	3	4	5	
Choi Ji-woo				4		

Guests

- Sunny (Season 2, Episodes 2–4)
- Choi Bool-am (cameo in Season 2, Episode 1)

== History ==
The show marked producer Na Young-seok's first variety show since leaving KBS, where he was best known for creating the first season of hit variety show 2 Days & 1 Night.

The first season aired from July 5 to August 16, 2013 with seven episodes. It was filmed in Paris, Strasbourg, Bern, and Lucerne.

It was immediately followed by the airing of the second season from August 23 to September 20, 2013. The five episodes were filmed in Taiwan, with an additional two-episode special featuring unaired footage on September 27 and October 4, 2013.

The third season aired from March 7 to May 2, 2014 with eight episodes. It was filmed in Spain, specifically the cities of Barcelona, Granada, Seville, Ronda, and Madrid. Shin Goo also went on a solo trip to Lisbon.

The fourth season aired from March 27 to May 8, 2015 with seven episodes. It was filmed in Dubai and Greece, with Choi Ji-woo joining as a second travel guide and assistant.

After a few years' break, a fifth season titled Grandpa Over Flowers Returns aired from June 29 to August 24, 2018 with nine episodes. Actor Kim Yong-gun joined the cast for the trip filmed in Germany, Czech Republic and Austria.

== Reception ==
The show's teaser trailers got a positive reception from viewers, which led to its press conference being streamed live through web portal Naver on June 28, 2013; although it is common for popular singers to stream their performances live, this was the first time a Korean variety show live-streamed its press promotion event.

Defying a youth-centric entertainment industry, Grandpas Over Flowers became a surprise ratings hit. It recorded 6 to 7 percent average viewership ratings (according to AGB Nielsen Korea). This was considered remarkable as many shows on Korean cable rarely secure viewership ratings of even 1 percent.

The show's audience demographic not only consisted of senior citizens, but younger viewers in their twenties and thirties. It resulted in renewed popularity and name recognition for its older cast, particularly among teenagers who were only familiar with the actors in their recent supporting roles as patriarchs in television dramas; this, in turn, led to more acting projects and commercials. Lee Seo-jin's cool, intellectual celebrity image was also reinvented through the show's more approachable portrayal of him as being witty yet bumbling while he gets constantly stressed out over being the older men's tour guide and "luggage boy".

According to Korean Air and Asiana Airlines, occupancy rates notably rose on flights to cities that appeared in the show.

It also sparked a trend of programs with older celebrities in leading roles, including the 2014 sitcom Flower Grandpa Investigation Unit which again starred Lee Soon-jae. But terrestrial broadcaster KBS received criticism for "copying" the concept of Grandpas Over Flowers through their new reality show Mamado ("Mama, Too"), which featured four veteran actresses — Kim Young-ok, Kim Yong-rim, Kim Soo-mi and Lee Hyo-chun — who go traveling with younger actor Lee Tae-gon. Another cable channel TV Chosun also launched the show Yes Yes, wherein veteran entertainers go on two-day trips with their grandchildren to the countryside all across Korea.

Show creator and PD Na Young-seok attributed the show's success to its cast and their spontaneity, saying, "It's because older people with a lot of experience, have lots of stories to tell. When you travel with people with a lot of experience who have gone through the success and failures in life, you learn a lot from them. Their stories teach us something about life." tvN executive Lee Deok-jae added, "I think it's because the program dealt with the universal issue of declining communications between old and young generations, and suggested solutions in ways that entertain viewers. I think entertainment programs people watch only to kill time are quickly losing ground. For a program to have wide appeal and good feedback, it has to contain either a lesson or warm hearts or suggest something productive." Meanwhile, culture critic Jung Duk-hyun said, "Old people speak very frankly, but because of their experience: they have been through so much so they seem always unfazed. Programs such as Halbae are doing a good job in making an entertaining show out of their cast members, who are shown as people the younger generation of people can sympathize and identify with. And of course, the older generation of viewers love the experience of watching shows about people closer to their age."

Writer Lee Woo-jung was given a presidential commendation at the 2013 Korea Content Awards, which praised her show for its depiction of "four elderly backpackers with humor and warmth." Then in 2014, Grandpas Over Flowers won Best Entertainment Program at the 50th Baeksang Arts Awards.

== Spin-offs ==
Cable channel tvN produced two successful spin-offs with the same format and the same crew (including PD Na). Sisters Over Flowers (2013) aired in between seasons two and three of Grandpas Over Flowers, and it starred four middle-aged actresses (with ages ranging from forties to sixties) Youn Yuh-jung, Kim Ja-ok, Kim Hee-ae and Lee Mi-yeon alongside 27-year-old singer-actor Lee Seung-gi, who travel to Croatia. Youth Over Flowers (2014) had a cast composed of three singer-songwriters in their forties (Yoon Sang, You Hee-yeol and Lee Juck) and three actors in their twenties and thirties (Yoo Yeon-seok, Son Ho-jun and Baro), who went to Peru and Laos, respectively. Youth Over Flowers itself became a huge hit, spanning five seasons from 2014 to 2017.

== Remakes ==
Grandpas Over Flowers was exported to TVB in Hong Kong and EBC in Taiwan, prompting a CJ E&M network executive to say, "It is really surprising that the grandfathers have become a leading force in Hallyu."

The show's popularity in China led to the production of a Chinese remake titled Hua Yang Ye Ye, which was directed by Li Wen Yu and co-produced by CJ E&M. Starring Lei Kesheng, Niu Ben, Chin Han, Kenneth Tsang and Liu Ye (with a guest appearance by f(x) member Victoria), its first season was also filmed in Europe, and it aired on Dragon Television in June 2014.

An American remake began airing in September 2016 at NBC. Titled Better Late Than Never, Craig Zadan and Neil Meron are attached as directors, and it is produced by Small World IFT, Storyline Entertainment, and Universal Television. The show follows cultural icons Henry Winkler, William Shatner, Terry Bradshaw, and George Foreman "on the journey of a lifetime, traveling across Asia on their own with no schedule and no itinerary. The only 'help' comes from Jeff Dye, a strong young tech-savvy comedian with an agenda of his own – who isn't above leading the men off track. Each stop is packed with hilarious cultural experiences, heartwarming spectacles, and unexpected twists as the legends take on this unforgettable adventure."

After the success of the American remake, a Dutch version under the literal translation of the former Beter Laat Dan Nooit will air from September 2018 onwards at RTL. Starring Dutch actor and singer Gerard Cox, actor Peter Faber, journalist and TV-personality Willibrord Frequin, Dutch-based British choreographer Barrie Stevens, and fashion designer Olcay Gulsen as the travel guide, traveled like their American counterpart across Asian countries.

== Ratings ==
- In the ratings below, N/R means no record or not reported, the highest rating for the show will be in red and the lowest rating for the show will be in blue each year.

Season 1, 2 & unaired episode (2013)
Episode	Date	AGB Nielsen Ratings (Nationwide)
1	5 July	4.1%
2	12 July	4.4%
3	19 July	4.4%
4	26 July	5.0%
5	2 August	5.0%
6	9 August	6.4%
7	16 August	5.7%
8	23 August	6.4%
9	30 August	5.8%
10	6 September	6.0%
11	13 September	6.5%
12	20 September	3.7%
13	27 September	3.9%
14	4 October	4.1%

Season 3 (2014)
Episode	Date	AGB Nielsen Ratings (Nationwide)
1	7 March	6.8%
2	14 March	6.8%
3	21 March	6.5%
4	28 March	6.6%
5	4 April	6.8%
6	11 April	5.4%
7	25 April	6.0%
8	2 May	5.1%

Season 4 (2015)
Episode	Date	AGB Nielsen Ratings (Nationwide)
1	27 March	9.5%
2	3 April	8.7%
3	10 April	9.0%
4	17 April	8.5%
5	24 April	8.5%
6	1 May	7.4%
7	8 May	7.6%

Season 5 (2018)
Episode	Date	AGB Nielsen Ratings (Nationwide)
1	29 June	9.189%
2	6 July	8.453%
3	13 July	9.595%
4	20 July	8.851%
5	27 July	8.444%
6	3 August	7.908%
7	10 August	7.919%
8	17 August	7.378%
9	24 August	7.635%

== Awards and nominations ==
Year	Award	Category	Recipient	Result
2014	50th Baeksang Arts Awards	Best Entertainment Program	Grandpas Over Flowers	Won
2015	51st Baeksang Arts Awards	Grand Prize (Television)	Na Young-seok	Won
2016	tvN10 Awards	Grand Prize (Daesang), Variety Performer	Lee Seo-jin	Won
2016	tvN10 Awards	Best Content Award, Variety	Grandpas Over Flowers	Won
2016	tvN10 Awards	Variety Icon	Lee Soon-jae, Shin Goo, Park Geun-hyung and Baek Il-seob	Won
2016	tvN10 Awards	Two Star Award	Choi Ji-woo	Nominated
2016	tvN10 Awards	Two Star Award	Shin Goo	Nominated
