= TvN10 Awards =

2016 South Korean media award ceremony

tvN10 Awards
- Date: October 9, 2016
- Site: KINTEX, Ilsanseo District, Goyang, Gyeonggi Province
- Presented by: CJ E&M (tvN)
- Hosted by: Main: Kang Ho-dong; Shin Dong-yup; Special: Yang Se-hyung
- First award: 2016
- Website: http://tvn10festival.interest.me/

Television/radio coverage
- Network: tvN
- Runtime: 250 minutes

tvN10 Awards is an award ceremony for excellence in television in South Korea, organized by tvN, one of the networks under the umbrella of CJ E&M. It was held at the KINTEX in Ilsanseo District, Goyang, Gyeonggi Province and was emceed by Kang Ho-dong and Shin Dong-yup on October 9, 2016.

== Background ==
A part of "tvN10 Festival", the inaugural ceremony was a celebration of 10 years of broadcasting by cable network tvN. The nominees were chosen from dramas, comedy shows and variety shows that aired on tvN from October 2006 to September 2016.

== Nominations and winners ==
(Winners denoted in bold)

Grand Prize (Daesang), Drama	Grand Prize (Daesang), Variety
**Reply 1988**	**Three Meals a Day: Fishing Village 1, 2**
Grand Prize (Daesang), Actor	Grand Prize (Daesang), Variety Performer
**Cho Jin-woong** - **Signal**	**Lee Seo-jin** - **Three Meals a Day: Jeongseon Village**, **Grandpas Over Flowers**
Best Actor	Best Actress
**Lee Sung-min** - **Misaeng: Incomplete Life**; Cho Jin-woong - Signal; Lee Je-hoon - Signal; Eric Mun - Another Miss Oh; Sung Dong-il - Reply series	**Kim Hye-soo** - **Signal**; Choi Ji-woo - Second 20s; Go Hyun-jung - Dear My Friends; Kim Hye-ja - Dear My Friends; Seo Hyun-jin - Another Miss Oh
Best Comedian	Best Comedienne
**Yang Se-hyung** - **Comedy Big League**; Jang Dong-min - Comedy Big League; Jung Sung-ho - SNL Korea; Lee Jin-ho - Comedy Big League; Yang Se-chan - Comedy Big League; Yoo Se-yoon - SNL Korea	**Ahn Young-mi** - **Comedy Big League**; Jang Do-yeon - Comedy Big League; Jung Yi-rang - SNL Korea; Lee Guk-joo - Comedy Big League; Park Na-rae - Comedy Big League
Best Content Award, Drama	Best Content Award, Variety
**Another Miss Oh**; **Dear My Friends**; **Misaeng: Incomplete Life**; **Nine**; **Oh My Ghost**; **Reply 1988**; **Reply 1994**; **Reply 1997**; **Ugly Miss Young-ae**; **Signal**	**Comedy Big League**; **The Genius**; **Grandpas** – **Sisters** – **Youth Over Flowers**; **House Cook Master Paik**; **Martian Virus**; **New Journey to the West**; **Problematic Men**; **Roller Coaster**; **SNL Korea**; **Three Meals a Day**
Best MC	Variety Icon
**Shin Dong-yup** - **SNL Korea**; Jun Hyun-moo - Problematic Men; Kim Gura - Martian Virus; Kim Sung-joo - Martian Virus; Lee Kyung-kyu - Martian Virus; Lee Young-ja - Live Talk Show Taxi	**Lee Soon-jae**, **Shin Goo**, **Park Geun-hyung** and **Baek Il-seob** - **Grandpas Over Flowers**; Paik Jong-won - House Cook Master Paik; Cha Seung-won and Yoo Hae-jin - Three Meals a Day: Fishing Village 1, 2; Kang Ho-dong, Lee Soo-geun, Eun Ji-won and Ahn Jae-hyun - New Journey to the West – Season 2; Lee Seo-jin - Three Meals a Day: Jeongseon Village
Romantic-Comedy King	Romantic-Comedy Queen
**Eric Mun** - **Another Oh Hae-young**; Jo Jung-suk - Oh My Ghost; Park Seo-joon - A Witch's Love; Sung Joon - I Need Romance 3; Yoon Doo-joon - Let's Eat 2	**Seo Hyun-jin** - **Another Miss Oh**; Jung Yu-mi - I Need Romance 2012; Park Bo-young - Oh My Ghost; Park Shin-hye - My Cute Guys; Yoo In-na - Queen and I
Made in tvN, Actor in Drama	Made in tvN, Actress in Drama
**Seo In-guk** - **Reply 1997**; Jung Woo - Reply 1994; Park Bo-gum - Reply 1988; Ryu Jun-yeol - Reply 1988; Seo Kang-joon - Cheese in the Trap; Yim Si-wan - Misaeng: Incomplete Life	**Seo Hyun-jin** - **Another Miss Oh**; Go Ara - Reply 1994; Jung Eun-ji - Reply 1997; Kang So-ra - Misaeng: Incomplete Life; Kim Hyun-sook - Ugly Miss Young-ae; Lee Hye-ri - Reply 1988
Made in tvN, Actor in Variety	Made in tvN, Actress in Variety
**Son Ho-jun** - **Three Meals a Day: Fishing Village 1, 2**; Hong Jin-ho - The Genius; Jung Sang-hoon - SNL Korea; Kim Min-kyo - SNL Korea; Kwon Hyuk-soo - SNL Korea; Lee Sang-joon - Comedy Big League	**Kim Seul-gi** - **SNL Korea**; Jeong Ga-eun - Roller Coaster; Jung Yi-rang - SNL Korea; Lee Se-young - SNL Korea; Park Na-rae - Comedy Big League
PD's Choice Award, Drama	PD's Choice Award, Variety
**Lee Je-hoon** - **Signal**	**Jung Sang-hoon** - **SNL Korea**
Special Acting Award	Best Chemistry Award
**Sung Dong-il** - **Reply series**	**Park Bo-young** and **Kim Seul-gi** - **Oh My Ghost**
Two Star Award	Asia Star Award
**Jo Jung-suk** - **Oh My Ghost**, **Youth Over Flowers**; Choi Ji-woo - Second 20s, Grandpas Over Flowers; Go Kyung-pyo - Reply 1988, SNL Korea; Kim Ji-seok - Another Miss Oh, Problematic Men; Shin Goo - Dear My Friends, Grandpas Over Flowers; Youn Yuh-jung - Dear My Friends, Sisters Over Flowers	**Park Bo-gum** - **Reply 1988**
Perfect Attendance Award in Drama	Perfect Attendance Award in Variety
**Kim Hyun-sook** - **Ugly Miss Young-ae**	**Lee Young-ja** - **Live Talk Show Taxi**
Rising Star Award, Actor	Rising Star Award, Actress
**Ryu Jun-yeol** - **Reply 1988**	**Lee Hye-ri** - **Reply 1988**
Scene-Stealer Award, Actor	Scene-Stealer Award, Actress
**Kim Sung-kyun** - **Reply 1988**; Byun Yo-han - Misaeng: Incomplete Life; Jang Hyun-sung - Signal; Kang Ha-neul - Misaeng: Incomplete Life; Kim Ji-seok - Another Miss Oh; Lee Dong-hwi - Reply 1988	**Ra Mi-ran** - **Reply 1988**; Kim Mi-kyung - Another Miss Oh; Kim Sun-young - Reply 1988; Lee Il-hwa - Reply series; Ryu Hye-young - Reply 1988; Ye Ji-won - Another Miss Oh
Variety "Slave" Award	Best Kiss Award
**Kwon Hyuk-soo** - **SNL Korea**; **Lee Se-young** - **Comedy Big League**; Jang Do-yeon - Comedy Big League; Jo Se-ho - Let's Go Time Expedition; Kim Kwang-kyu - Three Meals a Day: Jeongseon Village 2	**Seo In-guk** and **Jung Eun-ji** - **Reply 1997**; 2nd place: Eric Mun and Seo Hyun-jin - Another Miss Oh; 3rd place: Park Bo-gum and Lee Hye-ri - Reply 1988; 4th place: Jo In-sung and Go Hyun-jung - Dear My Friends; 5th place: Jung Woo and Go Ara - Reply 1994; 6th place: Jo Jung-suk and Park Bo-young - Oh My Ghost; 7th place: Kim Ji-seok and Ye Ji-won - Another Miss Oh; Not ranked: Lee Jin-wook and Jo Yoon-hee - Nine; Yeon Woo-jin and Han Groo - Marriage, Not Dating; Yoon Doo-joon and Seo Hyun-jin - Let's Eat 2

== Presenters ==
Order	Presenter	Award
1	Ryu Jun-yeol	Best Content Award, Drama (3 dramas)
2	Park Sung-woong	Made in tvN, Variety
3	Lee Seo-jin, Cha Seung-won	Made in tvN, Drama
4	Ku Hye-sun	Best Content Award, Variety (3 shows)
5	Go Kyung-pyo, Yura (Girl's Day)	Variety "Slave" Award
6	Jung Sang-hoon	Scene-Stealer Award
7	Ha Seok-jin, Park Ha-sun	Rising Star Award
8	Lee Sung-min	Best Content Award, Drama (4 dramas)
9	Ra Mi-ran	Perfect Attendance Award in Drama
10	Song Yoon-ah	Perfect Attendance Award in Variety
11	Entourage's main cast (Seo Kang-joon, Cho Jin-woong, Lee Kwang-soo, Lee Dong-hwi, Park Jung-min)	Two Star Award
12	Jun Hyun-moo	Asia Star Award
13	Yoo Se-yoon	Best Content Award, Variety (3 shows)
14	Lee Sang-min, Tak Jae-hoon	Best Comedian/Comedienne
15	Na Young-seok, Jung Yi-rang	PD's Choice Award
16	Eun Jiwon	Best Content Award, Drama (3 dramas)
17	Jung Eun-ji (Apink), Lee Hye-ri (Girl's Day)	Special Acting Award
18	Kim Ji-seok, Ye Ji-won	Romantic-Comedy King/Queen
19	Jo Se-ho	Best Content Award, Variety (4 shows)
20	Sung Dong-il, Seolhyun (AOA)	Variety Icon; Best MC
21	Kim Sang-joong, Park So-dam	Best Actor/Actress
22	Lee Soon-jae, Shin Goo, Park Geun-hyung, Baek Il-seob	Grand Prize (Daesang), Actor/Variety Performer
23	Yoon Sang-ah (tvN's viewer delegate)	Grand Prize (Daesang), Drama/Variety

== Special performances ==
Order	Artist	Song
1	Psy	Napal Baji (나팔바지); Entertainer (연예인)
2	Seo In-guk and Jung Eun-ji	All For You (Reply 1997 OST)
3	Kim Sung-kyun and Min Do-hee	Fate (운명) (Reply 1994 OST)
4	Lee Moon-se	A Little Girl (소녀) (Reply 1988 OST); Flaming Sunset (붉은 노을)

== See also ==
- List of Asian television awards
