= Willibrord Frequin =

Dutch journalist and television presenter (1941–2022)

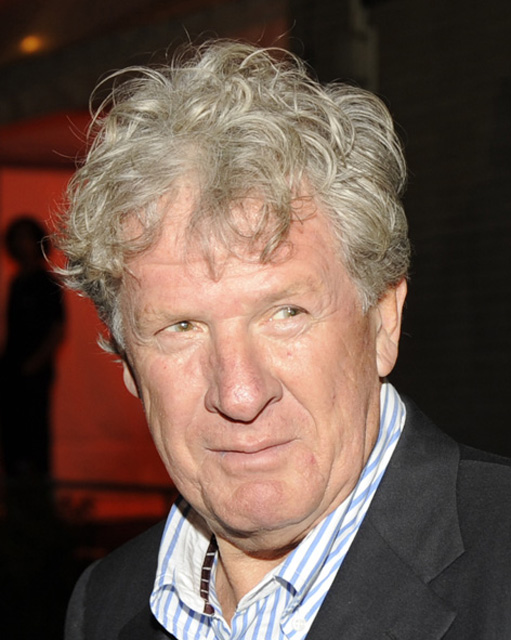
- Frequin in 2008
- Born: Willibrordus Jan Louis Maria Frequin; 6 September 1941; Arnhem, Reichskommissariat Niederlande, Germany
- Died: 26 May 2022 (aged 80); Laren, North Holland, Netherlands
- Occupation(s): Journalist, television presenter
- Children: 3

Willibrord Frequin (6 September 1941 – 26 May 2022) was a Dutch journalist and television presenter.

== Biography ==
Frequin was born in Arnhem, the son of Louis Frequin, an Editor-in-chief. He was raised in Nijmegen. Frequin attended the Canisuis College, a boarding school. He was a journalist for the Katholieke Radio Omroep since 1963, in which Frequin was also an assistant director at the NOS Studio Sport. In his life, he met head of the Catholic Church and sovereign of the Vatican City Pope John Paul II. In 1976, Frequin was the only journalist to ask the prince consort of Queen Juliana Prince Bernhard of Lippe-Biesterfeld regarding his part in the Lockheed bribery scandals.

Frequin worked for the RTL 4, RTL 5 and SBS6, where he served as a television presenter for programs. He worked for at least a year as a columnist for the magazine Panorama. In 1995, Frequin had made numerous appearances in the news for which he was being chased by a man with a pickaxe. He came off unscathed. In 2002, Frequin was arrested in Tokyo for "shooting" two paratroopers jumping off a skyscraper. In the same year on 20 December 2002, he had offset the house of politician and economist Wim Duisenberg and his wife Gretta Duisenberg with an Israeli flag for which he had rented a large aerial platform and Frequin also announced a playful action with a flag. He did not want to remove the flag or leave the premises on a summons from the police. Frequin was arrested then released after a few hours and the flag was confiscated.

In 2018, Frequin had a collaboration with Gerard Cox, Peter Faber and Barrie Stevens, in which they made an appearance in the program Beter Laat Dan Nooit. He then had another collaboration with them in 2020 in the same program. According to the De Telegraaf interview, Frequin had revealed that he was suffering from heart failure and Parkinson's disease, stating that he only has a few months to live. He was married four times.

Frequin died in May 2022 of Parkinson's disease in Laren, North Holland, at the age of 80.
