= Picnic (2023 film) =

2023 film by Kim Young-gyun

- Theatrical release poster
- Hangul: 소풍
- Hanja: 逍風
- RR: Sopung
- MR: Sop'ung
- Directed by: Kim Yong-gyun
- Written by: Jo Hyun-mi
- Starring: Na Moon-hee; Kim Young-ok; Park Geun-hyung; Ryu Seung-soo
- Cinematography: Kwak Kyung-ho
- Music by: Jeong Hyun-soo; Jeong So-ri
- Production company: Rocket Film Co.
- Distributed by: Lotte Entertainment
- Release dates: October 5, 2023 (BIFF); February 7, 2024 (South Korea)
- Running time: 114 minutes
- Country: South Korea
- Language: Korean
- Budget: ₩1.2 billion
- Box office: US$2.2 million

Picnic (Korean: 소풍) is a 2023 South Korean drama film directed by Kim Yong-gyun, starring Na Moon-hee, Kim Young-ok, Park Geun-hyung, and Ryu Seung-soo. It premiered at the 28th Busan International Film Festival on October 5, 2023, and was released in South Korea on February 7, 2024, by Lotte Entertainment.

== Synopsis ==
Eun-sim keeps seeing her late mother in her dreams these days. All of a sudden, Geum-soon, her best friend and in-law, comes to visit without contacting her. Eun-sim decides to visit her hometown in Namhae for the first time in 60 years and recalled memories from when she was 16. There, by chance, she meets Tae-ho, who had a crush on her. One by one, forgotten memories come to mind.

== Cast ==
- Na Moon-hee as Go Eun-sim, an elderly woman living alone in a mansion in Seoul
- Kim Young-ok as Jin Geum-soon, Eun-sim's friend from her hometown village
- Park Geun-hyung as Jeong Tae-ho, a man who had a crush on Eun-sim
- Ryu Seung-soo as Song Hae-woong, Eun-sim's son
- Lee Hang-na as Yoon Mi-hyeon, Hae-woong's wife and Geum-soon's daughter
- Im Ji-kyu as Yoon Seong-pil, Geum-soon's son
- Gong Sang-a as Jeong Yun-ju, Tae-ho's daughter

== Production ==
=== Development ===
Contrary to expectations that it would be a heartwarming film about the friendship of the elderly, after its release, it was revealed that the film mainly deals with the heavy themes of death with dignity and the conflict with the new generation that forces the older generation to make sacrifices.

=== Filming ===
Most scenes of the movie were filmed in Pyeongsan-ri, Nam-myeon, Namhae County, South Gyeongsang Province.

== Reception ==
=== Box office ===
As of March 10, 2024, Picnic has grossed $2.2 million with a running total of 331,489 tickets sold, exceeding the break-even point of 270,000 admissions.

=== Accolades ===
Award	Year	Category	Recipient(s)	Result	Ref.
Baeksang Arts Awards	2024	Best Supporting Actor	Park Geun-hyung	Nominated	
