= Live Talk Show Taxi =

- Promotional poster
- Genre: Talk show
- Presented by: Lee Young-ja; Oh Man-seok
- Country of origin: South Korea
- Original language: Korean
- No. of episodes: 501

Production
- Running time: 60 minutes
- Production company: tvN

Original release
- Network: tvN
- Release: September 8, 2007 – November 1, 2017

Live Talk Show Taxi (Korean: 현장토크쇼 택시; also known as Live Talk Show TAXI or TAXI) is a 2014 South Korean talk show presented by Lee Young-ja and Oh Man-seok. It airs on tvN on Tuesdays at 23:00 (KST).

== Presenter ==
- Lee Young-ja (September 2007 – December 2012, June 2014 – November 2017)
- Kim Chang-yeol (September 2007 – December 2008)
- Gong Hyung-jin (January 2009 – August 2012)
- Kim Gu-ra (September 2012 – May 2014)
- Jun Hyun-moo (October 2012 – July 2013)
- Hong Eun-hee (August 2013 – May 2014)
- Oh Man-seok (June 2014 – November 2017)

== International versions ==
Country	Local Title	Host	Channel	Broadcast Timeline
Vietnam	Taxi Show Vietnam	Current; Quốc Bảo (1-); Huy Khanh (1-)	VTC 5 tvBlue	Season 1: April 11, 2017 – present

== Awards and nominations ==
Year	Award	Category	Recipient	Result
2016	tvN10 Awards	Best MC	Lee Young-Ja	Nominated
2016	tvN10 Awards	Perfect Attendance Award in Variety	Lee Young-Ja	Won
