= Youth Over Flowers =

South Korean travel-reality show

- Also known as: Friends Over Flowers
- Hangul: 꽃보다 청춘
- Hanja: 꽃보다 靑春
- RR: Kkotboda cheongchun
- MR: Kkotpoda ch'ŏngch'un
- Genre: Travel, Reality
- Written by: Lee Woo-jung; Choi Jae-young
- Directed by: Na Young-seok; Shin Hyo-jung (1st, 2nd & 5th edition); Shin Won-ho (2nd edition); Yang Jung-woo (3rd & 4th edition)
- Country of origin: South Korea
- Original language: Korean
- No. of seasons: 5
- No. of episodes: 29

Production
- Production locations: Seoul; Peru; Laos; Iceland; Namibia; Botswana; Zimbabwe; Zambia; Australia
- Running time: 90 minutes Fridays at 21:40 (KST)

Original release
- Network: tvN
- Release: August 1, 2014 – January 9, 2018

Related
- Grandpas Over Flowers; Sisters Over Flowers

Youth Over Flowers (Korean: 꽃보다 청춘) is a South Korean travel-reality show which premiered on tvN in 2014.

== Editions ==
=== I. Peru ===
- Yoon Sang
- You Hee-yeol
- Lee Juck

The three singer-songwriters went on a backpacking tour of Peru, with Machu Picchu as their ultimate destination. They went to Peru on June 25, 2014, and were only informed about the trip three hours before the flight, causing them to travel with no luggage.

=== II. Laos ===
- Yoo Yeon-seok
- Son Ho-jun
- Baro

Similar to the previous season, the three actors (who all starred in Reply 1994) were also not informed about their trip to Laos and only found out about it three hours before the flight. They went to Laos on July 7, 2014, and returned on July 14, 2014.

=== III. Iceland ===
- Jung Sang-hoon
- Jung Woo
- Jo Jung-suk
- Kang Ha-neul

This season of Youth Over Flowers was initially announced with three cast members, Jung Sang-hoon, Jung Woo, and Jo Jung-suk. The three actors went to Iceland on November 25, 2015, whereas Kang Ha-neul, who thought he couldn't go due to his commitment to appear at the Blue Dragon Film Awards, was surprised by the Youth Over Flowers team and taken right after the award show to join the other actors on November 26, 2015. The four actors were given a mission to see aurora before they return home on December 4, 2015.

=== IV. Namibia & Zimbabwe ===
- Ahn Jae-hong
- Ryu Jun-yeol
- Go Kyung-pyo
- Park Bo-gum

On January 22, 2016, Ahn Jae-hong, Ryu Jun-yeol, and Go Kyung-pyo were surprised by Youth Over Flowers team during the last day of their Reply 1988's celebratory vacation in Phuket, Thailand and were taken to Namibia. Park Bo-gum who had returned from Phuket early for his Music Bank filming was taken right after the recording concluded. The actors stayed in Namibia and Zimbabwe for 10 days and returned to South Korea on February 2, 2016.

=== V. Australia ===
- Winner
  - Kim Jin-woo
  - Lee Seung-hoon
  - Song Min-ho
  - Kang Seung-yoon

After completing the mission on New Journey to the West 4, Song Min-ho chose to film Youth Over Flowers with his band (Winner) as his prize. The wish were granted and Youth Over Flowers team tricked Winner and took them to Australia on October 10, 2017. They stayed in Australia for 7 days and returned to South Korea on October 18, 2017.

== Airtime ==
Airdate	Airtime
August 1, 2014 – October 10, 2014	Friday at 9:40 PM KST
January 1, 2016 – April 1, 2016	Friday at 9:40 PM KST
November 7, 2017 – November 28, 2017	Tuesday at 10:50 PM KST

== Ratings ==
=== 2014 ===
Peru

Episode	Original airdate	AGB Ratings
Episode	Original airdate	Average ratings
1	August 1, 2014	4.6%
2	August 8, 2014	5.5%
3	August 15, 2014	5.7%
4	August 22, 2014	4.9%
5	August 29, 2014	4.8%
6	September 5, 2014	3.8%

Laos

Episode	Original airdate	AGB Ratings
Episode	Original airdate	Average ratings
7	September 12, 2014	5.4%
8	September 19, 2014	5.7%
9	September 26, 2014	4.8%
10	October 3, 2014	5.0%
11	October 10, 2014	3.7%

=== 2016 ===
Iceland

Episode	Original airdate	AGB Ratings
Episode	Original airdate	Average ratings
1	January 1, 2016	8.2%
2	January 8, 2016	8.5%
3	January 15, 2016	7.8%
4	January 22, 2016	6.9%
5	January 29, 2016	6.7%
6	February 5, 2016	8.2%
7	February 12, 2016	7.5%

Namibia & Zimbabwe

Episode	Original airdate	AGB Ratings
Episode	Original airdate	Average ratings
8	February 19, 2016	11.8%
9	February 26, 2016	10.4%
10	March 4, 2016	8.8%
11	March 11, 2016	8.3%
12	March 18, 2016	6.2%
13	March 25, 2016	5.8%
14	April 1, 2016	4.1%

=== 2017 ===
Australia

Ep.	Date	Average audience share		
Ep.	Date	AGB Nielsen		TNmS
Ep.	Date	Nationwide	Seoul	Nationwide
1	November 7, 2017	3.377%	3.797%	4.9%
2	November 14, 2017	2.376%	2.855%	3.6%
3	November 21, 2017	2.236%	2.485%	2.6%
4	November 28, 2017	1.692%	1.549%	2.2%
5	January 9, 2018 (Note: Director's cut with Kang's Kitchen)	5.880%	6.742%	7.1%

== Awards and nominations ==
Year	Award	Category	Recipient	Result
2016	tvN10 Awards	Best Content Award, Variety	Youth Over Flowers	Won
2016	tvN10 Awards	Two Star Award	Jo Jung-suk	Won
