= Park Geun-hyung =

South Korean actor

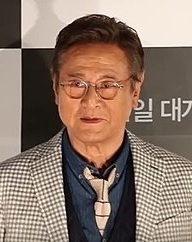
- Park in 2016
- Born: June 7, 1940 (age 86); Jeongeup, North Jeolla Province, South Korea
- Other name: Park Keun-hyong
- Education: Chung-Ang University - Theater and Film
- Occupation: Actor
- Years active: 1963–present
- Agent: SB Entertainment
- Children: Park Sang-hoon (son)
- Honours: Eungwan Order of Cultural Merit (2017)

Korean name
- Hangul: 박근형
- Hanja: 朴根瀅
- RR: Bak Geunhyeong
- MR: Pak Kŭnhyŏng

Park Geun-hyung (born June 7, 1940) is a South Korean actor. His career in film, television and theater has spanned over five decades.

== Career ==
He was born in Suseong-ri, Jeongju-eup, Jeongeup-gun, Jeollabuk-do during the Japanese colonial period in 1940 (currently, Suseong-dong, Jeongeup-si). After graduating from middle school, he studied at Whimoon High School in Seoul. He was active in the theater department at Whimoon High School. Then He majored in theater and film at Seorabeol Arts College (predecessor of Chung-Ang University College of Arts), and became a member of the National Theater Company after graduation. Park debuted in 1963 KBS 3rd public recruitment talent.

Park was originally one of the leading actors of the National Theatre in the 1960s. He joined the National Theatre Company in 1964 and was active until 1967. He played the role of Geum Oh-bong in the play The Movement of Thread and Needle at the People's Theatre in 1968. He won the Dong-A Theater Award for Best Actor.

He debuted on the screen in 1969 with the movie 7 People in the Basement, which is regarded as a masterpiece by director Lee Seong-gu. In 1974 he won the Grand Bell Award for Best Actor in the movie Painter Lee Joong-seop.

=== Variety show ===
In 2013, cable channel tvN launched the travel-reality show Grandpas Over Flowers (the title parodies the manga Boys Over Flowers). It marked producer Na Young-seok's first variety show since leaving KBS, where he was best known for creating the first season of hit variety show 2 Days & 1 Night. Defying a youth-centered entertainment industry, the hit show stars four veteran actors in their 70s, Lee Soon-jae, Shin Goo and Baek Il-seob, with their porter actor Lee Seo-jin as they go on a backpacking tour of France, Taiwan and Spain.

The first season aired from July 5 to August 16, 2013, with seven episodes. It was filmed in Paris, Strasbourg, Bern, and Lucerne. It was immediately followed by the airing of the second season from August 23 to September 20, 2013. The five episodes were filmed in Taiwan, with an additional two-episode special featuring unaired footage on September 27 and October 4, 2013. The third season aired from March 7 to May 2, 2014, with eight episodes. It was filmed in Spain, specifically the cities of Barcelona, Granada, Seville, Ronda, and Madrid. Shin Goo also went on a solo trip to Lisbon. The fourth season aired from March 27 to May 8, 2015, with seven episodes. It was filmed in Dubai and Greece, with Choi Ji-woo joining as a second travel guide and assistant.

After a few years' break, a fifth season titled Grandpa Over Flowers Returns aired from June 29 to August 24, 2018, with nine episodes. Actor Kim Yong-gun joined the cast for the trip filmed in Germany, Czech Republic and Austria.

== Filmography ==
=== Film ===
- 7 People in the Cellar (1969)
- Lovers of Seoul (1973)
- Spies in the National Assembly (1974)
- The Wild Flowers in the Battlefield (1974)
- Pupils of Evil (1974)
- Lee Jung-seob, a Painter (1974)
- Black Butterfly (1974)
- The Tigress (1974)
- The Instinct (1974)
- Flower and Snake (1975)
- Unfortunate Woman (1975)
- Visitor in Dawn (1975)
- Wasteland (1975)
- Wood and Swamp (1975)
- Lovers (1975)
- A Special Investigator, One-Armed Kim Jong-won (1975)
- Why Did I Do That? (1975)
- Black Night (1975)
- An Extinguished Window (1976)
- Seong Chun-hyang (1976)
- A Young Man Aware of Kwang Hwa Moon Well (1976)
- Wife (1976)
- The Door (1977)
- Under the Sky With No Mother (Sequel) (1977)
- The Land of Snow (1977)
- The World without Mom (1977)
- A Traveler with Love (1977)
- Scholar Yul-gok and His Mother Shin Sa-im-dang (1978)
- The Door of Youth (1978)
- Chorus of Doves (1978)
- Confession of Life or Death (1978)
- Wanderer (1978)
- There Must be Mother Somewhere (1978)
- Festival of the Chicks (1978)
- The Swamp of Exile (1978)
- No More Sorrow (1978)
- The Loneliness of the Journey (1978)
- The Trappings of Youth (1979)
- The Rain at Night (1979)
- Jade Color (1979)
- Who Knows the Pain (1979)
- Eternal Inheritance (1979)
- Miss Oh's Apartment (Sequel) (1979)
- The Woman Who Stole the Sun (1979)
- The Last Secret Affair (1980)
- The Man Who Dies Every Day (1980)
- Lonely Star of Osaka (1980)
- The Warm-hearted Girl Gok-ji (1980)
- Home of the Stars 3 (1981)
- A Battle Journal (1981)
- The Invited Ones (1981)
- Tears of the Idol (1981)
- Iron Men (1982)
- The Tender Passion of the Thirteenth Month (1982)
- Sweethearts (1983)
- Daughter of Fire (1983)
- The Stolen Apple Tastes Good (1984)
- The Last Day of That Summer (1984)
- I Want To Go (1984)
- An Ark Shell Lands on Earth (1985)
- Getting on the Elevator (1985)
- A Long Journey, A Long Tunnel (1986)
- Ticket (1986)
- Gorgeous Transformation (1987)
- Yohwa Eoludong (1987)
- The Lady in the Wall (1988)
- All For You (1989)
- Who Broke the Red Rose Stem (1990)
- Enchantment (1990)
- Fire and Blood (1991)
- Who Saw the Dragon's Toenail? (1991)
- I Have Nothing (1991)
- The Son and the Lover (1992)
- The Rose of Sharon Blooms Again (1995)
- Boss (1996)
- Kill the Love (1996)
- Channel 69 (1996)
- Father (1997)
- Free to Fly (1997)
- Promenade (2000)
- The Rhapsody (2001)
- Boss X File (2002)
- Marrying the Mafia (2002)
- Another Public Enemy (2005)
- Parallel Life (2010)
- Grand Prix (2010)
- Return of the Mafia (2012)
- Boomerang Family (2013)
- Salut d'Amour (2015)
- Because I Love You (2017)
- Detective K: Secret of the Living Dead (2018)
- Innocent Witness (2019)
- In the Name of the Son (2021)
- Camellia (2021)
- Remember (2022)
- Picnic (2023)
- People and Meat (2025)

=== Television series ===
Year	Title	Role	Notes/Ref.
1969	Lovers of the Sun		
1969	Beloved Reed		
1969	Frog Husband		
1972	The Imjin War		
1972	Song of the Reeds		
1973	Kowloon Peninsula		
1973	Royal Emissary		
1974	Telephone		
1974	Some Couples		
1974	Servant Girl		
1974	Wings		
1974	Rivers and Mountains of the Eight Provinces in Bloom		
1974	On Ruya		
1975	Heartless		
1977	I Regret It		
1978	Trap of Youth		
1978	Happiness for Sale		
1978	Even if the Wind Blows		
1979	Who Are You		
1979	Chief Inspector		
1980	Terminal		
1980	Lawyer Hong		
1981	1st Republic	Song Jin-woo	
1981	Nari House		
1981	Cloth and Paper		
1981	Aging Human		
1982	Conditions of Love		
1983	Galaxy of Dreams		
1983	Diary of Youth		
1983	Geum-nam's House		
1984	Cliff		
1984	Fireworks		
1985	Silver Rapids		
1985	Police Task Force		
1986	Farewell to Love		
1987	Lee Cha-don		
1987	MBC Bestseller Theater – "Piano Murder"		
1987	Guests Who Arrived on the Last Train		
1987	Temptation		
1987	Love and Ambition		
1988	The Golden Tower		
1988	Human Market		
1988	The Sandcastle		
1989	Young-joo's Proof		
1989	The Fifth Row		
1989	Half of a Failure - Divorced Couples		
1990	Night Train		
1990	Ambitious Times		
1990	Wife's Garden		
1991	Rosy Life		
1991	My Heart Is a Lake		
1991	Eyes of Dawn		
1992	Calendula		
1992	Namok		
1992	Rainbow in Mapo		
1992	Gwanchon Essay		
1993	The Third Republic		
1993	Good Morning, Yeong-dong		
1993	Woman's Mirror		
1993	The Distant Ssongba River		
1993	My Mother's Sea		
1993	Friday's Woman – "Woman on the Edge of the Cliff"		
1994	Police		
1994	Adam's City		
1994	Last Lovers		
1995	A Sunny Place of the Young		
1995	The Fourth Republic		
1995	Journey		
1995	War and Love		
1995	Your Voice		
1995	You Said You Loved Me		
1995	A Bold Man		
1995	Sandglass		
1996	Ahn Joong-geun		
1996	Until We Can Love		
1996	Crime Squad		
1996	The Brothers' River		
1997	Yesterday		
1997	Beyond the Horizon		
1998	Until the Azalea Blooms		
1998	Barefoot Days		
1998	Seven Brides		
1998	The King's Path		
1998	Advocate		
1998	Love and Success		
1999	Should My Tears Show		
1999	Sunday Best – "Just a Pickpocket's Pattern"		
1999	When Time Flows		
1999	Sunday Best – "The Wind Blows in Yeouido"		
1999	The Little Prince		
1999	Days of Delight		
1999	Into the Sunlight		
2000	Oh-cheon's Secret Number		
2000	Tough Guy's Love		
2000	Fireworks		
2000	Foolish Princes		
2000	SWAT Police		
2000	Secret		
2000	Daddy Fish		
2001	Delicious Proposal		
2001	Stock Flower		
2001	Her House		
2001	Morning Without Parting		
2001	Pure Heart		
2001	Wonderful Days		
2002	My Name is Princess		
2002	Miss Mermaid		
2002	Affection		
2002	Ice Flower		
2003	Fairy and Swindler		
2003	South of the Sun		
2004	Phoenix		
2004	Beautiful Temptation		
2005	Traveling Women		
2005	Hong Kong Express		
2005	Love Hymn		
2005	Love and Sympathy		
2005	Becoming a Popular Song		
2005	Marrying a Millionaire		
2006	Jumong		
2006	Fireworks		
2006	My Beloved Sister		
2006	My Lovely Miss Dal-ja		
2006	Special Crime Investigation: Murder in the Blue House		
2007	By My Side		
2007	The Person I Love		
2007	Surgeon Bong Dal-hee		
2007	Cruel Love		
2008	Woman of Matchless Beauty, Park Jung-geum		
2008	HDTV Literature – "Spring, Spring Spring"		
2008	You Are Very Good		
2008	East of Eden		
2008	Glass Castle		
2009	The Road Home		
2009	The Return of Iljimae		
2009	Assorted Gems		
2010	Definitely Neighbors		
2010	Big Thing		
2010	It's Okay, Daddy's Girl		
2011	You're So Pretty		
2011	The Musical		
2011	Color of Woman		
2012	Tasty Life		
2012	The Chaser		
2012	Miss Panda and Mr. Hedgehog		
2012	The Third Hospital		
2012	Ugly Cake		
2012	The King of Dramas		
2012	How Long I've Kissed		
2013	You Are the Boss!		
2013	Empire of Gold		
2013	The Suspicious Housekeeper		
2013	A Little Love Never Hurts		
2014	Mother's Garden		
2014	Tears of Heaven		
2014	4 Legendary Witches		
2015	Angry Mom		
2016	The Love Is Coming		
2017	Criminal Minds	Cameo	
2018	Evergreen		
2018	I Am the Mother Too		
2018	Four Men		
2018	A Pledge to God		
2019	Doctor Detective		
2020–2022	The Good Detective		
2021	Undercover		
2021	Taxi Driver	Cameo	
2022	Sponsor	President Park	
2024	Beauty and Mr. Romantic	Kim Joon-seop	

=== Web series ===
Year	Title	Role	Notes	Ref.
2022–2023	Island	Jong-ryeong	Part 1–2	

=== Variety shows ===
Year	Title		Role	Notes/Ref.
Year	English	Korean	Role	Notes/Ref.
1977	KBS Long Live Hometown	KBS 내고장만세	MC	
1978	DBS Park Geun-hyung's Female Number One	DBS 여성넘버원	DJ	
1995	KBS Between Night and Music	KBS 밤과 음악사이	MC	
2007	TJB Hwache trip	TJB 화첩기행	Main Cast	
2010	Jeonju MBC Radio Yoo Jeong Cheon-ri	유정천리	MC	
2017	The Chaser with Park Geun-hyung		Main Cast	TV Chosun
2013; 2014; 2015	Grandpas Over Flowers (Season 1 to 5)	꽃보다 할배	Cast Member	tvN
2021	Granpar	그랜파	Cast Member	

=== Music video appearances ===
Year	Song title	Artist	Ref.
2006	"Mo Memory"	Melo Breeze	

== Theater ==
List of stage play(s)
Year	Title		Role	Theater	Date	Notes/Ref.
Year	English	Korean	Role	Theater	Date	Notes/Ref.
1964	Desire	욕망	Lieutenant Kim	National Theater of Korea (Myeongdong)	March 1–10	
1964	Manseon	만선	성삼	National Theater of Korea (Myeongdong)	July 1–7	
1964	The Martyred	순교자	Pastor	National Theater of Korea (Myeongdong)	Sep 28–Oct 4	
1965	Not ashamed to cry	울어도 부끄럽지 않다	Maury Novak	National Theater of Korea (Myeongdong)	April 2–8	
1965	Bakkoji	바꼬지	Yoon-goo	National Theater of Korea (Myeongdong)	June 25–July 1	
1965	Narcissus	수선화	Lee Chang-sun	National Theater of Korea (Myeongdong)	Sep 29–Oct 5	
1966	Yi Sunsin	이민선	Song Hee-lip	National Theater of Korea (Myeongdong)	Jan 1–7	
1966	The Emigrant Ship	이민선	Repairer	National Theater of Korea (Myeongdong)	June 2–8	
1967	Returning to my mossy hometown	이끼 낀 고향에 돌아오다	Father Michael	National Theater of Korea (Myeongdong)	Dec 1–7	
1968	The Movement of Thread and Needle	실과 바늘의 악장	Geum Oh-bong	National Theater of Korea (Myeongdong)	Sep 17–22	
1972	POWs	포로들	Watt Surgeon	National Theater of Korea (Myeongdong)	May 16 to 22	
1983	King Lear	리어왕				
1992	Two Women, Two Men	두여자 두남자	Professor	Trade Center Hyundai Department Store Hyundai To Art Hall	April 22-May 17	
1999	The Abduction from the Seraglio	후궁탈출	Pasha Selim	Sejong Center for the Performing Arts	June 4	
2012	Snow in March	3월의 눈	Jang Oh	National Theater of Korea Baek Sung-hee Jang Min-ho Theater	Jan 1–March 18	
2016	Father	아버지	Andre	Myeongdong Arts Theater	July 13–August 14	
2023	Death of a Salesman	세일즈맨의 죽음	Willie Roman	National Theater of Korea Daloreum Theater	May 21–June 7	

== Accolades ==
=== Award and nominations ===
Year	Award	Category	Nominee / Work	Result	Ref.
1968	5th Dong-A Theatre Awards	Best Theater Actor	The Movement of Thread and Needle	Won	
1974	13th Grand Bell Awards	Best Actor	Lee Jung-seob, a Painter	Won	
1979	15th Baeksang Arts Awards	Best Actor	The Swamp of Exile	Won	
1979	The Korea Times	Actor of the Year	Park Geun-hyun	Won	
1989	25th Baeksang Arts Awards	Most Popular TV Actor	Sandcastle	Won	
1991	29th Grand Bell Awards	Best Supporting Actor	Who Saw the Dragon's Toenail?	Won	
1996	SBS Drama Awards	Grand Prize	The River of Brothers	Won	
1997	24th Korea Broadcasting Awards	Best Male Talent	Park Geun-hyun	Won	
1999	MBC Drama Awards	Special Award	Park Geun-hyun	Won	
2000	KBS Drama Awards	Top Excellence Award, Actor	Tough Guy's Love	Won	
2002	MBC Drama Awards	Special Award	Miss Mermaid	Won	
2005	KBS Drama Awards	Best Actor in a One-Act Drama/Special	Becoming a Popular Song	Won	
2007	5th Korean Culture and Environment Awards	Best Talent (Note: In Korea, "talent" is another term for "TV actor.")	Park Geun-hyun	Won	
2008	2008 MBC Drama Awards	Golden Acting Award, Actor in a Serial Drama	Woman of Matchless Beauty, Park Jung-geum, East of Eden	Won	
2010	2010 SBS Drama Awards	Achievement Award	Daemul	Won	
2012	2012 SBS Drama Awards	PD Award	The Chaser	Won	
2013	13th Korea Youth Film Festival Popularity Award for Senior Actor	Popularity Award for Senior Actor	Park Geun-hyun	Won	
2015	14th Korea National Assembly Award	Award for Achievement	Park Geun-hyun	Won	
2015	The 23rd Korean Culture and Entertainment Awards	Grand Prize in Film Category	Jangsu Sanghoe	Won	
2016	20th Bucheon International Fantastic Film Festival Korean	Fantastic Best Actor Award	Grandfather	Won	
2016	1st tvN10 Awards	Entertainment Icon Award (Note: shared with Lee Soon-jae, Shin Goo and Baek Il-seob)	Grandpas Over Flowers	Won	
2024	60th Baeksang Arts Awards	Best Supporting Actor – Film	Picnic	Nominated	
2026	Beautiful Art Awards (Shin Young-kyun Arts and Culture Foundation)	Performing Artist Award	Park Geun-hyung	Won	

=== State honors ===
List of state honour(s)
State	Award Ceremony	Year	Honor	Ref.
South Korea	8th Korean Popular Culture and Arts Awards (Note: Since 2010 Honors are given at the Korean Popular Culture and Arts Awards, arranged by the Korea Creative Content Agency and hosted by the Ministry of Culture, Sports and Tourism.)	2017	Eungwan Order of Cultural Merit (2nd Class)	
