= Sisters Over Flowers =

2013 South Korean television series

- Promotional poster
- Also known as: Noonas Over Flowers
- Hangul: 꽃보다 누나
- RR: Kkotboda nuna
- MR: Kkotpoda nuna
- Genre: Variety show
- Written by: Lee Woo-jung
- Directed by: Na Young-seok
- Starring: Youn Yuh-jung; Kim Ja-ok; Kim Hee-ae; Lee Mi-yeon; Lee Seung-gi
- Country of origin: South Korea
- Original language: Korean
- No. of seasons: 1
- No. of episodes: 8

Production
- Executive producer: Lee Myung-han
- Production locations: Seoul; Turkey; Croatia
- Running time: 90 minutes Fridays at 22:00 (KST)

Original release
- Network: tvN
- Release: 29 November 2013 – 17 January 2014

Related
- Grandpas Over Flowers; Youth Over Flowers

Sisters Over Flowers (Korean: 꽃보다 누나; RR: Kkotboda nuna), also known as Noonas Over Flowers, is a South Korean travel-reality show that aired on tvN from 29 November 2013 to 17 January 2014. It featured veteran actresses Youn Yuh-jung, Kim Ja-ok, Kim Hee-ae and Lee Mi-yeon going on a 10-day backpacking trip through Turkey and Croatia, accompanied and assisted by the significantly younger Lee Seung-gi. The trip covered the cities of Istanbul, Zagreb, Split, and Dubrovnik.

It is a spin-off of Grandpas Over Flowers, which featured a similar premise but with older male actors. The show's title also follows after its predecessor, which is itself a word play/parody on Boys Over Flowers (花より男子, Hana Yori Dango), a popular Japanese manga about four handsome young men.

== Cast ==
- Youn Yuh-jung
- Kim Ja-ok
- Kim Hee-ae
- Lee Mi-yeon
- Lee Seung-gi

== Production ==
While Grandpas Over Flowers starred a cast of veteran actors in their seventies, the Sisters Over Flowers cast were significantly younger and spanned a wider age range, with Youn Yuh-jung and Kim Ja-ok in their 60s alongside Kim Hee-ae and Lee Mi-yeon in their 40s. Producer Na Young-seok said the age gap was intentional during casting as they "wanted actors with more than 15 years of experience" who were "wise, experienced and had great life stories to tell."

Singer-actor Lee Seung-gi, then 27 years old, was also cast as the actresses' companion and "luggage boy." This marked Lee's reunion with producer Na, whom he had previously worked with on hit reality show, 2 Days & 1 Night. Lee later admitted that he had difficulty fulfilling his duties as a tour guide for the actresses.

Producer Na said he chose Eastern Europe as the show's destination because most Koreans are unfamiliar with it, praising Croatia as an "exotic" country with "strong colors, beautiful landscapes, and cultural heritage."

== Reception ==
Sisters Over Flowers was a hit with audiences, surpassing Grandpas Over Flowers by recording an average viewership rating of 7.5 percent with a peak rating of 10.5 percent, a significant figure considering most Korean cable programs rarely reach 1 percent. Like its predecessor, the show's success also led to a Chinese remake.

Actresses Kim Hee-ae and Lee Mi-yeon also saw a boost in popularity after the show, with clothing and accessories worn by the former becoming sold out in stores.

The show had a notable impact on tourism in Croatia, with Korean tourist arrivals rising sharply from 70,000 in 2013 before its airing to 147,000 from February to July 2014. In September 2014, visiting Speaker of the Croatian Parliament Josip Leko gave the Order of the Croatian Star to CJ Group vice chairwoman Lee Mi-kyung on behalf of his government for her contributions to Croatian tourism and economy. Lee is the first Korean to win this highest recognition from the Croatian government.

== Ratings ==
In the ratings below, the highest rating for the show will be in red and the lowest rating for the show will be in blue.

Episode	Date	AGB Nielsen (Nationwide)
1	29 November 2013	9.8%
2	6 December 2013	8.6%
3	13 December 2013	9.0%
4	20 December 2013	7.6%
5	27 December 2013	7.6%
6	3 January 2014	7.0%
7	10 January 2014	6.2%
8	17 January 2014	6.6%

- Note that the show airs on a cable channel (pay TV), which plays part in its slower uptake and relatively small audience share when compared to programs broadcast (FTA) on public networks such as KBS, SBS, MBC or EBS.

== Awards and nominations ==
Year	Award	Category	Recipient	Result
2016	tvN10 Awards	Best Content Award, Variety	Sisters Over Flowers	Won
2016	tvN10 Awards	Two Star Award	Youn Yuh-jung	Nominated
