= Yoon Sang =

South Korean musician (born 1968)

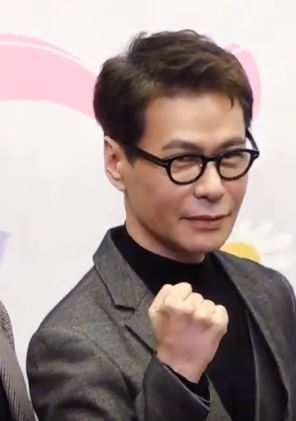
- Yoon Sang in September 2019

Background information
- Born: 11 May 1968 (age 58); Seoul, South Korea
- Genres: Electronic; synthpop; Ballad; Pop; Jazz; R&B
- Occupations: Composer; record producer; singer-songwriter; professor
- Instruments: Vocals; guitar bass; piano; keyboard; guitar
- Years active: 1987–present
- Labels: Pop Music Co., Ltd.
- Member of: OnePiece
- Website: Official Website (Archive.org)

Korean name
- Hangul: 이윤상
- RR: I Yunsang
- MR: I Yunsang

Stage name
- Hangul: 윤상
- RR: Yun Sang
- MR: Yun Sang

Lee Yoon-sang (Korean: 이윤상; born 11 May 1968), known professionally as Yoon Sang, is a South Korean composer, record producer, singer and songwriter. He currently serves as a contemporary music professor at Sungshin Women's University.

== Music career ==
Lee began his musical career as a bassist in a band supporting pop singer Kim Wan-sun. He received an offer for a solo debut from Kim Kwangsoo, now head of MBK Entertainment, in 1990 and released an album incorporating synthpop elements entitled Vol.1 to commercial success.Vol.1 was followed with Vol.2 Part 1 in 1992 and Vol.2 Part 2 in 1993. Vol.2 was the more avant-garde and experimental of the two albums but still found commercial success. The title song, "가려진 시간 사이로 (Between The Hidden Time / Between the Veiled Times)" was especially popular.

Lee's third album release, Renacimiento in 1996, consists of remakes of songs from his previous albums sung by French, Italian and American vocals with redone lyrics. Renacimiento was one of the first mainstream albums in Korea incorporating the world music genre and was also popular. Yoon Sang also released a techno album entitled Golden Hits as part of the music collaborative project "NoDance" with rock artist Shin Hae-chul.

After releasing 移徙 이사 (Migration) in 2002 Yoon Sang worked on composing and lyric-writing for SM Entertainment, penning songs for BoA and TVXQ, among other artists. In 2003 he released There Is A Man..., his fifth album, which incorporated rap, Latin, and electronic dance music. A track from that album entitled "길은 계속된다 (The road continues)" also incorporated glitch music. In 2008, Lee released a tribute album called YOONSANG SONGBOOK : Play With Him! with covers by many Korean groups, including electronic duo Peppertones and rock band My Aunt Mary.

In 2009 Lee released an eponymous glitch-focused album as part of project group called "" with fellow Korean musicians Kayip and Superdrive. The group was formed while Lee spent two semesters at the NYU School of Music Technology. Both Kayip (카입) and Superdrive (슈퍼드라이브) were experienced with electronic and IDM-focused music and Lee wanted to expand awareness of these types of music domestically. They finished producing the record by sending files over email and MySpace and held a showcase for the album at Hongik University.

In 2015 Yoon Sang participated in the Infinite Challenge Music Festival and was partnered with cast member Jeong Jun-ha.

In 2019 he was a judge in the JTBC talent show Superband.

In 2022 Yoon made his debut as a music director with the Film Twisted House. Later in July, Yoon has been confirmed to join the music program Sing in the Green.

== Personal life ==
Yoon graduated from Kung Hee University in 1987 with a bachelor's degree in ceramics and crafts. He later studied in the United States, graduating from the Berklee College of Music in 2007 with a bachelor's degree in music synthesis, and graduating from New York University in 2010 with a master's degree in music technology.

Yoon married actress Shim Hye-jin in 2002. The couple met in 1998 when Shim was cast in the music video for Yoon's song, "As Always". They have two sons: Lee Chan-young (born 2004) and Lee Jun-young (born 2009). His eldest son, Chan-young, made his debut with boy group Riize, under SM Entertainment, in September 2023, using his English name, Anton, as his stage name.

== Discography ==
=== Studio albums ===
Title	Album details	Peak chart positions	Sales
Title	Album details	KOR (MIAK)	Sales
Yoon Sang	Released: 30 November 1990; Label: Jigu Records	*	KOR: 900,000
Yoon Sang 2 Part 1	Released: 15 October 1992; Label: Jigu Records	*	KOR: 1,000,000
Yoon Sang 2 Part 2	Released: 1 September 1993; Label: Jigu Records	*	KOR: 300,000
Cliche	Released: 11 June 2000; Label: ode music	20	KOR: 64,720
Migration (이사)	Released: April 12, 2002; Label: SM Entertainment	29	KOR: 21,478
There Is A Man...	Released: April 15, 2003; Label: SM Entertainment	22	KOR: 14,923
I Didn't Know Yet (그땐 몰랐던 일들)	Released: July 3, 2009; Label: ode music	*	
An asterisk (*) denotes a chart that was inactive when the recording was released.

=== Compilation albums ===
Title	Album details	Peak chart positions		Sales
Title	Album details	KOR (MIAK)	KOR (Circle)	Sales
Yoon Sang Golden Best (윤상 골든 베스트)	Released: 1996; Label: Jigu Records	*	*	
Yoon Sang Best	Released: 11 April 2001; Label: Dong-A Planning	39	*	KOR: 11,518
Yoon Sang 20th Anniversary	Released: 14 April 2011; Label: ode music	*	8	KOR: 2,640
An asterisk (*) denotes a chart that was inactive when the recording was released.

=== Extended plays ===
Title	Album details	Peak chart positions	Sales
Title	Album details	KOR (Circle)	Sales
Renacimiento	Released: 1996; Label: Jigu Records	*	
Insensible	Released: 1 April 1998; Label: DMR	*	KOR: 30,344
The Duets	Released: 11 December 2014; Label: ode music	10	KOR: 1,968
An asterisk (*) denotes a chart that was inactive when the recording was released.

== Filmography ==
=== Television ===
Title	Year(s)	Notes	Ref.
Youth Over Flowers	2014	Cast member	
Fantastic Duo	2016	Panelist	
Phantom Singer	2016–2020	Judge	
King of Mask Singer	2018–present	Panelist	
Superband	2019	Judge	

== Awards and nominations ==
Award	Year	Category	Nominated work / nominee	Result	Ref.
Golden Disc Awards	1991	Rookie of the Year	Yoon Sang	Won	
Golden Disc Awards	1992	Album Bonsang	Yoon Sang 2 Part 1	Won	
Korean Music Awards	2010	Musician of the Year	Yoon Sang	Nominated	
Korean Music Awards	2010	Best Dance & Electronic Album	I Didn't Know Yet	Nominated	
Korean Music Awards	2010	Best Dance & Electronic Song	"Hit the Road"	Nominated	
Korean Music Awards	2010	Best Movie/TV Album Soundtrack	Noodle Road OST	Nominated	
Korean Music Awards	2015	Best Dance & Electronic Song	"If You Wanna Console Me"	Won	
Korean Music Awards	2015	Song of the Year	"If You Wanna Console Me"	Nominated	
MBC Broadcasting Awards	1992	Excellence Award in Radio	Yoon Sang's Disc Show	Won	
MBC Entertainment Awards	2019	Achievement Award	King of Mask Singer	Won	
MBC Gayo Daejejeon	1991	Top 10 Singer Award	Yoon Sang	Won	
Seoul Music Awards	1991	Composition Award	Yoon Sang	Won	

=== State honors ===
Country	Ceremony	Year	Honor	Ref.
South Korea	Korean Popular Culture and Arts Awards	2018	Presidential Commendation	
