= Baek Il-seob =

South Korean actor

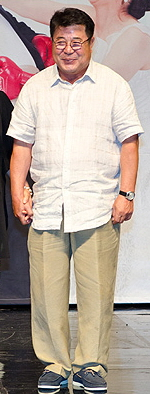
- Baek in 2013
- Born: June 10, 1944 (age 82); Yeosu, South Jeolla Province, South Korea
- Education: Myongji University; English Literature
- Occupation: Actor
- Years active: 1965–present

Korean name
- Hangul: 백일섭
- Hanja: 白一燮
- RR: Baek Ilseop
- MR: Paek Ilsŏp

Baek Il-seob (Korean: 백일섭; born June 10, 1944) is a South Korean film and television actor. In recent years he appeared in the family dramas Mom's Dead Upset, My Too Perfect Sons, and Ojakgyo Brothers.

In 2007, Baek landed in the news after he made remarks at a GNP rally denouncing candidate Lee Hoi-chang's late entry into the presidential race.

== Filmography ==
=== Film ===
- Salut d'Amour (2015) (cameo)
- My Brilliant Life (2014)
- Scout (2007)
- Underground Rendezvous (2007) (cameo)
- Sorrow Even Up in Heaven (2007)
- Magang Hotel (2007)
- Hot for Teacher (2006)
- Lump Sugar (2006) (cameo)
- Hanbando (2006)
- Oh! My God (2006)
- Marrying the Mafia II (2005) (cameo)
- My Boyfriend Is Type B (2005)
- Everybody Has Secrets (2004)
- Spy Girl (2004)
- My Tutor Friend (2003)
- No Blood No Tears (2002)
- Without You (2002)
- Girl, 18 Years Old (1993)
- Marijuana (1990)
- A Burning Rose (1990)
- Sexual Compatibility (1988)
- Madame (1987)
- Mom Is Away (1987)
- Just Once (1987)
- Seven Slaps on the Face (1987)
- Seoul Likes Women (1987)
- Osaka Godfather (1986)
- Heungnam City That I Saw Last (1984)
- My Life is Mine (1983)
- Hotel at 00:00 (1983)
- The Sparrow and the Scarecrow (1983)
- Pyongyang Head Butt (1983)
- Jongro Blues (1982)
- Hwa-sun (1982)
- The Hero, Pal Bul-chul (1982)
- Man Who Couldn't Be Persuaded (1980)
- Dull Servant, Pal Bul-chul (1980)
- The Woman Who Laughed Three Times (1980)
- The Deaf Worker (1980)
- Male Housemaid (1980)
- The Man Who Stops Storms (1979)
- Eul-hwa (1979)
- A Letter from Heaven (1979)
- Miss O's Apartment (1979)
- Byung-tae and Young-ja (1979)
- Romance Gray (1979)
- Wanderer (1978)
- Once Upon a Long Time Ago (1978)
- I Love Only You (1978)
- Woman Walking on Asphalt (1978)
- The Virgin's Castle (1977)
- Even I Don't Know My Mind (1977)
- A Dangerous Woman (1976)
- Cuckoo's Dolls (1976)
- Wang Sib Ri, My Hometown (1976)
- Pebbles (1975)
- Cattle (1975)
- The Fool Yong-chil (1975)
- The Road to Sampo (1975)
- The Executioner (1975)
- A Triangular Trap (1975)
- A True Story of Kim Du-han (1974)
- Dalrae (1974)
- The Han River (1974)
- She Spoke in Death (1974)
- A Season of Blooming Love (1974)
- Cheongnyeo (1974)
- Gypsy in My Mind (1974)
- My Daddy and I (1974)
- Black Butterfly (1974)
- Heavenly Homecoming to the Stars (1974)
- Reminiscences (1974)
- Heavenly Wind (1973)
- Luck (1974)
- Testimony (1974)
- A Match (1973)
- Homecoming (1973)
- Highway of Youth (1973)
- Youth in Barefoot (1973)
- Tto-sun and Gab-sun (1973)
- Leaving Myeongdong (1973)
- A Couple's Shift (1973)
- Resentment of Daughter-in-law (1972)
- Gap-dol and Gap-sun (1972)
- The Last Flight to Pyongyang (1972)
- Bachelor in Trouble (1971)
- A Sworn Brother (1971)
- Jang, the Knife (1970)
- Minbi and Magic Sword (1970)
- Wang-geon, the Great (1970)
- Swordsmen From Eight Provinces (1970)
- Female Soldiers from All the Provinces (1970)
- The Harbormaster Returns (1970)
- The Woman Who Wanted an Apartment (1970)
- The Last Song of Hope (1970)
- A Girl on Myeongdong Street (1970)
- White Rose (1969)
- A Native of Myeongdong (1969)
- Mrs. Wonnim (1969)
- Barber of Jangmaru Village (1969)
- Jumper Q (1969)
- The Third Zone (1969)
- Girls (1969)
- Dead Woman (1969)
- Love and Hate (1969)
- Three Musketeers (1969)
- The World of Men (1969)
- Private Kim (1969)
- Childish Daughter-in-law (1968)
- A Wandering Swordsman and 108 Bars of Gold (1968)
- Revenge (1968)
- Incoherent Answer (1968)
- Mr. Gu at Sajik Village (1968)
- Sam-hyeon-yuk-gak (1968)
- The General's Mustache (1968)
- United Front (1967)
- Dolmuji (1967)

=== Television drama ===
- Top Star U-back (tvN / 2018) (cameo)
- Drama Festival – "The Marvelous Sunshine Funeral Home for the Elderly" (MBC / 2013)
- Can't Stand Anymore (jTBC / 2013)
- Goddess of Marriage (SBS / 2013)
- Cheer Up, Mr. Kim! (KBS1 / 2012)
- I Remember You (SBS / 2012)
- Lights and Shadows (MBC / 2011)
- Ojakgyo Brothers (KBS2 / 2011)
- Believe in Love (KBS2 / 2011) (cameo)
- Flames of Desire (MBC / 2010)
- The Scarlet Letter (MBC / 2010)
- All About Marriage (KBS2 / 2010)
- A Man Called God (MBC / 2010)
- Doenjang-gun and Natto-jjang's Marriage War (MBC / 2010)
- The Woman Who Still Wants to Marry (MBC / 2010)
- Father's House (SBS / 2009)
- My Too Perfect Sons (KBS2 / 2009)
- Bitter Sweet Life (MBC / 2008)
- Mom's Dead Upset (KBS2 / 2008)
- Bad Woman, Good Woman (MBC / 2007)
- My Love (SBS / 2006)
- Love Can't Wait (MBC / 2006)
- Special of My Life (MBC / 2006)
- Taereung National Village (MBC / 2005)
- Let's Go to the Beach (SBS / 2005)
- Father of the Sea (MBC / 2004)
- My Lovely Family (KBS1 / 2004)
- Pretty Woman (MBC / 2004)
- Wedding Gift (KBS2 / 2003)
- Bodyguard (KBS2 / 2003)
- Golden Pond (SBS / 2002)
- Golden Wagon (MBC / 2002)
- Glass Slippers (SBS / 2002)
- Fox and Cotton Candy (MBC / 2001)
- Mina (KBS2 / 2001)
- Legend (SBS / 2001)
- Love on a Jujube Tree (KBS1 / 2001-2007)
- Wrath of an Angel (SBS / 2000)
- Nonstop (MBC / 2000)
- Fireworks (SBS / 2000)
- KAIST (SBS / 2000)
- I'm Still Loving You (MBC / 1999)
- You're One-of-a-Kind (MBC / 1999)
- My Love By My Side (KBS1 / 1998)
- Seven Brides (SBS / 1998)
- Six Children (MBC / 1998–2000)
- Three Women (KBS2 / 1997)
- Bride's Room (KBS2 / 1997)
- Miari No. 1 (SBS / 1997)
- OK Ranch (SBS / 1997)
- Golden Feather (MBC / 1997)
- Salted Mackerel (MBC / 1996)
- The Fourth Republic (MBC / 1995)
- The Liverish Man (KBS2 / 1995)
- Do You Remember Love (MBC / 1995)
- Way of Living: Woman (SBS / 1994)
- I Want to Be Happy (SBS / 1994)
- The Lonely Man (KBS2 / 1994)
- Good Morning, Yeongdong! (KBS2 / 1993)
- Never on Sunday (KBS2 / 1993–1995)
- The Third Republic (MBC / 1993)
- Sons and Daughters (MBC / 1992)
- Yoo Shim Cho (SBS / 1991)
- Half a Failure (KBS2 / 1989)
- Skewers (KBS2 / 1987)
- Eldest Sister-in-law (KBS2 / 1987)
- Detective 25 o'clock (KBS2 / 1986)
- My Happy Home (KBS2 / 1985)
- Now in Pyongyang (KBS2 / 1983)
- Foundation of the Kingdom (KBS1 / 1983)
- Wind Flower (KBS2 / 1982)
- Grape Fountain (KBS2 / 1981)
- Daemyeong (KBS1 / 1981)
- Windbuster Jang Yeong-sil (TBC / 1980)
- Road (MBC / 1970)
- Lover of the Sun (MBC / 1968)

=== Variety show ===
- Grandpas Over Flowers (tvN, 2013–2018)
- Granpar (MBN, 2021)

== Theater ==
List of Stage Play(s)
Year	Production		Role	Notes/Ref.
Year	English title	Korean title	Role	Notes/Ref.
2022	Art	아트	Ivan	
2022	Jangsu Sangho	장수상회	Kim Seong-chil	Special performance on Chuseok

== Book ==
- 살맛나는 임플란트 이야기 (2011; revised in 2012)

== Awards ==
- 2008 9th Korea Visual Arts Festival: Photogenic Award, TV actor category (Mom's Dead Upset)
- 2008 2nd Korea Drama Awards: Achievement Award (Mom's Dead Upset)
- 2002 Proud Yeosu
- 1996 MBC Drama Awards: Top Excellence Award
- 1993 29th Baeksang Arts Awards: Popularity Award
- 1975 11th Baeksang Arts Awards: Best Actor
