= List of programmes broadcast by tvN (Asia) =

This is a list of programmes broadcast on South Korean cable television channel Total Variety Network (tvN) Asia network.

== Original (tvN, Mnet, O'live, TVING) and acquired (CJ E&M and others) programs ==
- Amazing Saturday: DoReMi Market (including Idol Song Dictation Contest)
- Baek Jong-won's Street Food Fighter
- Be Mbitious
- Birdie Boys
- Boys Planet
- Bros on Foot
- Coffee Friends
- Cafe Amor
- Camp Zerobaseone
- EXchange/Transit Love
- Europe Outside Your Tent
- Earth Arcade (Season 1)
- Friends Over Flowers
- Great Escape
- Get It Beauty
- Get It Beauty on the Road (Note: tvN Asia Originals)
- Go Go with Mr. Paik
- Grandpas Over Flowers Returns
- Hometown Flex
- House on Wheels
- High School Mystery Club
- I Can See Your Voice
- I-Land (Season 1 & 2)
- K-Chef Battlefield
- K-Ocean Pathfinders
- K-Pop Generation
- Kang's Kitchen
- Kingdom: Legendary War
- Korean Hostel in Spain
- Korean Tasty Road
- Laborhood on Hire
- Leaving the Nest
- Love Catcher
- Mother's Touch: Korean Side Dishes
- M.U.S.T (My Unexpected Sweet Trip)
- New Journey to the West (including Spring Camp)
- On & Off
- One Day Healing Trip
- One Night Food Trip
- One Night Food Trip: International Edition
- Produce 48
- Produce X 101
- Produce 101
- Produce 101 Season 2
- Queendom
- Restaurant on Wheels
- Road to Kingdom
- RUN
- Summer Vacation
- Seoul At Home
- Seoul Check-In
- Street Man Fighter
- Street Woman Fighter (Season 1 & 2)
- Studying Girl
- Sweetheart in Your Ear
- Super TV
- The Sixth Sense
- Thrifter's Guide to Luxurious Travels
- Top Stars' Parallel Lives
- The Backpacker Chef
- The Call
- The Genius Paik
- The Skip Dating
- The Temps
- Three Meals a Day series
- TMI News
- Trans-Siberian Pathfinders
- Unexpected Business (Season 1 & 2)
- Wanna One Go (including Zero Base and X-CON seasons)
- We Don't Bite: Villains in the Countryside
- What Shall We Eat Today? (including Delivery and Global Recipe seasons)
- You Can Cook With Sam Kim
- You Quiz on the Block
- Youn's Kitchen
- Youn's Stay
- Young Actors' Retreat

=== Live programming ===
- MAMA Awards (previously known as Mnet Asian Music Awards; 2009–present)

=== tvN PRIMEDrama ===
- 100 Days My Prince
- About Time
- A Piece of Your Mind
- A Poem a Day
- A Korean Odyssey (Note: Previously carried by Netflix)
- Another Miss Oh
- Arthdal Chronicles
- Avengers Social Club
- Because This Is My First Life
- Black Dog (available in Indonesia)
- Bring It On, Ghost
- Catch the Ghost (available in Indonesia)
- Cheese In The Trap
- Criminal Minds
- Chicago Typewriter
- Circle: Two Worlds Connected
- Confession
- Delightfully Deceitful (available in Indonesia, Malaysia and Singapore)
- Designated Survivor: 60 Days
- Encounter
- Eve (available in Indonesia and Malaysia)
- Flower of Evil (available in Indonesia, Malaysia and Singapore)
- Ghost Doctor (available in Indonesia, Malaysia and Singapore)
- Goblin
- Happiness
- He Is Psychometric (available in Indonesia)
- Her Private Life
- Hometown (available in Indonesia, Malaysia and Singapore)
- Hotel del Luna
- Jirisan (Note: Co-distribute with iQiyi) (available in Indonesia, Malaysia and Singapore)
- Kill Heel (available in Hong Kong (VOD only), Indonesia and Malaysia)
- Law and the City (Note: Co-distribute with Disney+/Disney+ Hotstar) (available in Indonesia, Malaysia and Singapore)
- Lawless Lawyer
- Let's Eat (Season 1–3)
- Live
- Live Up to Your Name
- Lovely Runner (available in Indonesia, Malaysia and Singapore)
- Memorist
- Mental Coach Jegal (available in Indonesia and Malaysia)
- Military Prosecutor Doberman (available in Indonesia, Malaysia and Singapore)
- Misaeng: Incomplete Life
- Miss Lee
- Money Game (available in Indonesia, Malaysia and Singapore)
- Mother
- Mouse (available in Hong Kong (VOD only), Indonesia, Malaysia and Singapore)
- Mr. Queen
- My Dearest Nemesis (available in Indonesia, Malaysia, and Singapore)
- My Mister
- My Roommate Is a Gumiho (available in Indonesia, Malaysia, and Singapore)
- My Unfamiliar Family
- Nine: Nine Time Travels
- Oh My Baby (available in Hong Kong (VOD only), Indonesia, Malaysia and Singapore)
- Oh My Ghost
- Pied Piper
- Poong, the Joseon Psychiatrist (available in Indonesia, Malaysia and Singapore)
- Prison Playbook
- Psychopath Diary (available in Indonesia, Malaysia and Singapore)
- Reply 1988
- Reply 1994
- Room No. 9
- Revolutionary Love
- Search: WWW
- Secret Royal Inspector & Joy (available in Indonesia and Malaysia)
- Second Shot at Love (available in Indonesia, Malaysia and Singapore)
- Sh**ting Stars
- Signal
- Stealer: The Treasure Keeper (available in Indonesia, Malaysia and Singapore)
- Stranger (Season 1; Season 2 was carried by Netflix)
- Tale of the Nine Tailed
- Tale of Fairy (available in Indonesia)
- The Auditors (available in Indonesia, Malaysia and Singapore)
- The Bride of Habaek
- The Crowned Clown (available in Indonesia, Malaysia and Singapore)
- The Cursed (available in Indonesia)
- The Devil Judge (available in Indonesia and Malaysia)
- The Great Show (available in Indonesia and Malaysia)
- The Heavenly Idol (available in Indonesia, Malaysia and Singapore)
- The K2
- The Queen Who Crowns (available in Indonesia, Malaysia and Singapore)
- The Road: The Tragedy of One (available in Hong Kong (VOD only), Indonesia, Malaysia and Singapore)
- The Smile Has Left Your Eyes
- Tomorrow, with You
- Top Star U-back
- Touch Your Heart (available in Indonesia, Malaysia and Singapore)
- True Beauty
- Twinkling Watermelon (Note: Co-distribute with Viu) (available in Indonesia, Malaysia and Singapore)
- What's Wrong with Secretary Kim
- When My Love Blooms
- When the Devil Calls Your Name (available in Indonesia, Malaysia and Singapore)

==== Acquired from OCN ====
- A Superior Day (available in Indonesia and Malaysia)
- Black
- Bad Guys 2 (available in Malaysia and Singapore)
- Chimera
- Duel
- Life on Mars
- Team Bulldog: Off-Duty Investigation
- Missing Noir M
- Missing: The Other Side (Season 2 was aired on tvN)
- The Player (Season 2 was aired on tvN)
- Save Me
- Strangers From Hell
- Tunnel
- The Virus (available in Hong Kong)
- Voice (Season 1–3; season 4 was aired on tvN)

==== Acquired from TVING ====
- A Bloody Lucky Day (Note: Co-distribute with Paramount; first-air linear rights) (available in Indonesia, Malaysia and Singapore)
- All That We Loved (available in Indonesia, Malaysia and Singapore)
- Bargain (available in Indonesia, Malaysia and Singapore; also on sister channel tvN Movies)
- Dr. Park's Clinic (available in Indonesia and Malaysia)
- Dreaming of a Freaking Fairy Tale (available in Indonesia, Malaysia and Singapore)
- Dongjae, the Good or the Bastard (available in Indonesia, Malaysia and Singapore)
- Duty After School (available in Indonesia, Malaysia and Singapore)
- Pyramid Game (available in Indonesia, Malaysia and Singapore)
- Queen Woo (available in Indonesia, Malaysia and Singapore)
- Work Later, Drink Now (Season 2) (available in Hong Kong (VOD only), Indonesia, Malaysia and Singapore)
- Yonder (available in Indonesia, Malaysia and Singapore; also on sister channel tvN Movies)
- Yumi's Cells (Season 1)

==== Acquired from other networks ====
- A Gentleman's Dignity (Produced by Hwa&Dam Pictures & CJ E&M for SBS)
- Be Melodramatic (Produced by Samhwa Networks for JTBC (Note: Licensed from SLL (formerly JTBC Studios)))
- Boyhood (Produced by The Studio M for Coupang Play) (available in Indonesia, Malaysia and Singapore)
- Cheongdam International High School a.k.a. B**ch X Rich (Produced by Whynot Media)
- Dear Hyeri (Produced by Studio Dragon and Studio Him for Genie TV/ENA (Note: Licensed from KT StudioGenie)) (available in Indonesia and Malaysia)
- Dear My Room (O'live)
- Diary of a Prosecutor (Produced by S-PEACE for JTBC)
- Heo's Diner (Produced by Whynot Media and The Great Show) (available in Indonesia, Malaysia and Singapore)
- My Happy Ending (Produced by Story Vine Pictures, Hi Ground, and IN Culture for TV Chosun) (available in Indonesia, Malaysia and Singapore)
- Not Others (Produced by Arc Media & Baram Pictures for Genie TV/ENA) (available in Indonesia, Malaysia and Singapore)
- Recipe for Farewell (Produced by Acemaker Movieworks and Beyond J for Watcha)
- Something in the Rain (Produced by Drama House Studio and Content K for JTBC)
- Taste Beyond The Senses (O'live)
- The Beauty Inside (Produced by Studio&NEW and Yong Film for JTBC)
- The Legend of the Blue Sea (Produced by Culture Depot & Studio Dragon for SBS)
- The World of the Married (Produced by JTBC Studios for JTBC)
- Welcome to Waikiki 2 (Produced by C-JeS Entertainment & Drama House Studio for JTBC)

=== tvN x tvBlue ===
tvBlue was a Vietnamese cable television channel aired on VTC5's feed. The brand was licensed by CJ ENM to SCTV. The channel was shut down on July 2, 2018.

- Bạn Có Bình Thường
- Hotgirl Loạn Thị

== See also ==
- List of programs broadcast by tvN (South Korean TV channel)
- List of programs broadcast by Arirang TV
- List of programmes broadcast by Korean Broadcasting System
- List of programs broadcast by Seoul Broadcasting System
- List of programs broadcast by JTBC
