= Na Yeong-seok =

South Korean TV producer (born 1976)

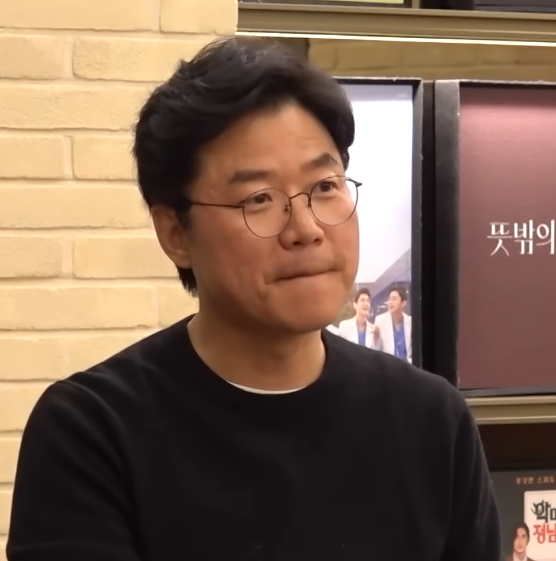
- Na in 2025
- Born: April 15, 1976 (age 50); Cheongju, South Korea
- Other names: Nah Yung Suk; Na PD
- Education: Yonsei University – Public Administration
- Occupations: Television producer; director
- Years active: 2001–present
- Employers: Egg is Coming CJ E&M Studio (2023–present); CJ E&M (2013–2022); KBS (2001–2012)
- Spouse: Undisclosed (m. 2011)
- Children: 1

Korean name
- Hangul: 나영석
- Hanja: 羅䁐錫
- RR: Na Yeongseok
- MR: Na Yŏngsŏk

Na Yeong-seok (Korean: 나영석, born April 15, 1976), often known by his nickname Na PD, is a South Korean television producer and director. Na is best known for producing the popular variety-reality shows 2 Days & 1 Night, New Journey to the West, Grandpas Over Flowers, Three Meals a Day, Youn's Kitchen, Youn's Stay, Earth Arcade and their spin-offs.

== Education ==
Na Young-seok was born on April 15, 1976, in Cheongju, North Chungcheong Province. He lived in his hometown during his middle and high school years, which he described as unremarkable and mundane. Afterwards, Na relocated to Seoul and enrolled at Yonsei University, where he pursued a major in Public Administration. He chose this field of study because his father worked as a civil servant at Cheongju City Hall and advised him to pursue a similar career path if he didn't have any particular aspirations. Initially, Na had plans to take the civil service exam after completing his studies.

During his college years, Na was active in the theater club of the College of Social Sciences, which the Department of Public Administration belongs to. From his freshman year until graduation, he dedicated himself to club activities. Beginning with minor roles, he gained diverse experiences as a supporting actor, staff member, and eventually even as a director. These experiences brought him joy and led him to consider pursuing a career in broadcasting industry, either in television or film.

After completing his studies, Na saw an advertisement for a sitcom writer and applied for it, and entered a film company as an assistant director. However, the company he joined faced financial difficulties and went bankrupt, leaving him unemployed within a mere two months. To make ends meet, he worked as an instructor at an academy while simultaneously preparing to join a media company. However, he struggled with the initial current affairs tests and failed most of them. In 2001, he made the decision to apply to KBS.

== Career ==
=== Early Career in KBS ===
In 2001, Na applied for the 27th Public Recruitment at KBS. He firmly believed that, as an evaluator, he would prefer selecting individuals who excelled in specific areas rather than those who were merely average in multiple areas. Due to his strong aversion to essay writing, he focused his attention on the art of plan writing. From that point onward, he devoted himself entirely to watching TV, narrowing his interests down to analyzing three specific aspects: "It's enjoyable because of this. If it's not enjoyable, it's not enjoyable because of this. If I were asked to modify this program, I would make the changes in this manner." Na firmly believed that his acceptance into KBS was a result of his exceptional 'plan'.

He began his career as an assistant director in the network's variety department. In 2002, he was assigned the role of assistant director to Lee Myung-han in the show "Declaration of Freedom Today is Saturday – The War Of Roses." The program revolved around male entertainers and female college students who would meet and find a mate at a mountain lodge. It was during this program that Shin collaborated with fellow assistant director Shin Won-ho and Lee Woo-jung, who served as the main writer.

In 2002, when Lee Myung-han was in charge of directing Super TV Sunday is Fun, His juniors were in charge of directing each segment of the show. Na was assigned the role as assistant director, in charge of segment Let's Go! Dream Team - Season 1. Meanwhile Shin Won-ho directing Kung Kung Ta. They worked together again in Star Golden Bell (2004).

They eventually formed a group famous as Yeouido Research Institute, (Note: Yeouido Research Institute is a small group consisting of Lee Myung-han, Na Young-seok, Shin Won-ho, and writer Lee Woo-jung. They met as seniors and juniors in the entertainment department at KBS. The four of them collaborated at KBS and achieved great success by producing acclaimed programs like 'Man's Qualification' and '1 Night 2 Days'. Even after recently transitioning to CJ, they continue to achieve remarkable success with each program they produce, consistently hitting the jackpot.)also later known as Lee Myung-han's division.

Na and Lee Myung-han reunited with writer Lee Woo-jung when both were in charge of co-directing Heroine 5. Heroine 5 was one of the segments of Sunday 101%, which was renamed Happy Sunday since November 2004, and it was broadcast from April 4, 2004, to May 1, 2005, on KBS 2. It was followed by the sequel, Heroine 6, which aired from May 8, 2005, to April 29, 2007, on KBS 2. When Lee and Na Young-seok developed another segments, Shin Won-hoo took over as the director.

Na and Lee Myung-han collaborated on two new segments of Happy Sunday: High Five and Are You Ready? High Fiveaired on KBS 2TV from May 6, 2007, to May 18, 2008. The show was hosted by Jee Seok-jin and it focused on five female stars who embarked on different job experiences. Throughout the series, they took on roles such as flight attendants, farmers, stuntwomen, and police officers. Given the diverse backgrounds of the stars, comedic twists and events were often incorporated into their training. The initial lineup of High Five stars included comedian Jo Hye-ryun, entertainer Hyun Young, singer Chae Yeon, MC Park Kyung-lim, and actress Kim Min-sun.

Happy Sunday: Are You Ready? was aired from May 6, 2007, to July 29, 2007. Kang Ho-dong served as the host, and the cast included Lee Soo-geun, Eun Ji-won, Kim Jong-min, Noh Hong-chul, and Ji Sang-ryeol. The show centered around the cast and special guests engaging in a variety of games. The initial three episodes focused on games related to the Chinese language, while the subsequent episodes leading up to the finale featured physical and logic-based games. However, due to poor ratings, Are You Ready? was discontinued after airing 12 episodes.

==== 2 Days & 1 Night ====
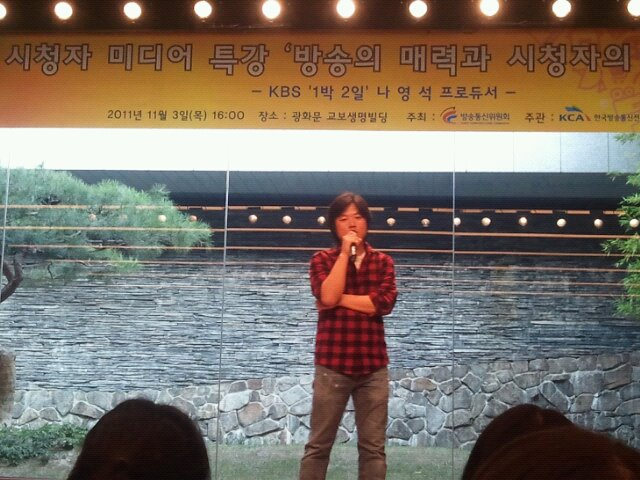
Na giving a lecture at the Korea Media and Communications Commission, 2011

Na and Lee Myung-han made their breakthrough in 2007 with 1 Night 2 Days, which introduced the road trip format to Korean reality programming, as a regular cast of comedians, singers and actors visit various towns across Korea and spend the eponymous one night and two days there, engaging in activities such as games, camping and sightseeing. Starring Kang Ho-dong, Lee Soo-geun, Eun Ji-won, Kim Jong-min, Noh Hong-chul, and Ji Sang-ryeol (Kim C, Lee Seung-gi, MC Mong, and Uhm Tae-woong later joined the cast),1 Night 2 Days quickly became the highest rated variety program on KBS and a national viewing pastime, reaching a peak viewership rating of 40%.

The show not only boosted tourism for the locations it featured, its massive popularity also extended to its cast and even the crew. Because Na often appeared onscreen during interactions with the cast, he himself soon became a household name among Korean audiences, who affectionately called him "Na PD" ("PD" is a commonly used term in Korean television that denotes "producer-director" or "production director").

Kim Seong-yoon, a researcher at the Institute for Culture and Society, said, "Na was the first producer to show a world view through entertainment," and analyzed, "This is the biggest reason why viewers remember PD's name clearly when they can't remember the name of other PDs."

In January 2012, Na, who was recognized for his contributions, was promoted to a second-level deputy general manager, one rank higher than before. Afterwards, he took a break by writing book. He also developed another KBS program in 2012, The Human Condition in October. Cast were six comedians (Kim Jun-hyun, Kim Joon-ho, Heo Kyung-hwan, Yang Sang-guk, Jung Tae-ho and Park Seong-ho) live together for seven days under certain restrictions, such as without gadgets, electricity, or water. Na produced the four-episode pilot. During this hiatus, transfer rumors circulated several times, but PD Na dismissed them as untrue.

Na resigned from KBS on December 18, 2012, after working for the broadcaster for 12 years. His departure and that of other cast members marked the end of the first season of 1 Night 2 Days (episodes 1–232); the second season was launched with a new crew and additional new cast members. The Human Condition also continued airing without Na's involvement.

=== Career in CJENM ===
==== Grandpas Over Flowers ====
On January 2, 2013, Na signed with media conglomerate CJ E&M, which owns cable channels such as tvN. CJ E&M had reportedly wooed him with not just a bigger salary, but the assurance of greater creative control and clout. Na said, "I determined that there is more room for creativity (in cable). Things move at a fast pace. The programs come and go as does the attention of viewers. So we are forced to try different things."

For his first cable program, Na again chose the concept of travel, but this time overseas. In an increasingly youth-obsessed medium and culture, he surprised pundits by casting four actors in their seventies: Lee Soon-jae, Shin Goo, Park Geun-hyung and Baek Il-seob. Since backpacking was mostly associated with the young, Na wanted to flip the idea and make it fresh. He said that by placing veteran actors (who are fixed in their habits) in exotic settings, it allowed for "unexpected" elements to unfold that made for great TV. Titled Grandpas Over Flowers (a pun on the Japanese manga Boys Over Flowers), the show filmed the four actors traveling to France and Switzerland while accompanied by their "porter", 40-something actor Lee Seo-jin. It was immediately a ratings hit when it aired in 2013, and like 2 Days & 1 Night before it, became a cultural phenomenon. The cast drew increased mainstream popularity among the younger generation, and the show sparked a trend of senior citizen-themed shows among rival networks. tvN also leveraged the show's domestic popularity into international success, selling remake rights to the United States. When asked why the show struck a chord with audiences, Na said, "It's because older people with a lot of experience, have lots of stories to tell. When you travel with people with a lot of experience who have gone through the success and failures in life, you learn a lot from them."

With the success of Grandpas Over Flowers following 2 Days & 1 Night, Na cemented his reputation as the most influential creator and producer in Korean reality television.

The next seasons were filmed in Taiwan (2013), Spain (2014), and Greece (2015). Actress Choi Ji-woo joined the cast for the Greece trip.

==== Sisters Over Flowers, Youth Over Flowers ====
While Grandpas Over Flowers went on hiatus in late 2013 (the cast was busy with their respective acting projects), Na produced the first spin-off, Sisters Over Flowers. Using the same format, he cast a group of top actresses (Youn Yuh-jung, Kim Ja-ok, Kim Hee-ae and Lee Mi-yeon) and pushed them out of their comfort zone as they traveled to Croatia. The show also reunited Na with 2 Days & 1 Night alum Lee Seung-gi, who acted as this season's "porter".

The second spin-off, which aired in 2014 after the Spain season of Grandpas Over Flowers, was Youth Over Flowers. It featured singer-songwriters Yoon Sang, You Hee-yeol and Lee Juck in Peru, and Reply 1994 actors Yoo Yeon-seok, Son Ho-jun and Baro in Laos. Na only directed the Peru segments, while Reply 1994 director Shin Won-ho filmed in Laos. Both spin-offs likewise drew high ratings for cable. The series later spawned three more seasons; which were filmed in Iceland, Africa (featuring the cast of Reply 1988) and Australia (featuring boy band Winner).

Na also made cameo appearances on two tvN scripted series. As a meta in-joke about his real-life alma mater, he played a boarder from Yonsei University in episode 2 of the nostalgic campus drama Reply 1994. Reply 1994's director Shin Won-ho and screenwriter Lee Woo-jung had previously worked with Na on 2 Days & 1 Night. Then as a favor to Lee Soon-jae, Na played a police officer in episode 66 of Lee's sitcom Potato Star 2013QR3.

==== Three Meals a Day ====
After Youth Over Flowers, Na wanted to continue to innovate. Inspired by Lee Seo-jin's complaints that he hated cooking while preparing meals in Grandpas Over Flowers, Na cast Lee opposite his Wonderful Days co-star Ok Taecyeon in Three Meals a Day. The two men were tasked to cook three meals a day from home-grown ingredients while living three days a week in a rural village in Jeongseon County, Gangwon Province . Though the concept seemed simple, Lee and Ok, both city dwellers, had difficulty cultivating the vegetable garden and harvesting from the farm animals and the sorghum field, such that they struggled to feed themselves (and weekly celebrity guests) to comical results. Na said, "All cooking shows do not have to feature fancy, delicious food. We seek the sincerity that comes from cooking with all their hearts. I just wanted to work on a lighthearted show that can highlight the small pleasures of life. I wanted to talk about a meal that is made with vegetables from my garden and have these two guys share their homely foods with their friends. The main concept is that it is a cooking show but with no mouth-watering foods because these two guys can't cook."

For the second season in 2015, Na added a third cast member, Kim Kwang-kyu. The show's difficulty level was increased with an additional four-month project depicting the process of growing food, from cultivation to harvest (the cast was strictly prohibited from grocery shopping). Na said, "Nature itself is incredible. I wanted to show the audience how hard it is to harvest the materials for our daily meals that can now be easily purchased at supermarkets near our homes."

==== Three Meals a Day: Fishing Village ====
In 2015, Na produced the spin-off Three Meals a Day: Fishing Village, set on the remote island of Manjae, which takes six hours to reach by ferry from the mainland. Besides the isolated location, the seaside setting meant more intensive physical labor for cast members Cha Seung-won, Yoo Hae-jin, and Son Ho-jun (Son replaced Jang Keun-suk when Jang was edited out of the show after a tax evasion controversy). Viewers were impressed with Cha's cooking skills amidst minimal ingredients and implements (hence his nickname "Chajumma"), and the show received a record-high 14.2% rating. Season 1 had a winter setting, while the second season was filmed in the summer. For the show's third season, Na added a new member, Nam Joo-hyuk. The location was switched from a fishing village to Gochang, where the members take on rice-farming for the first time. The show resumed its "fishing village" concept in the next season, which was filmed in Deukryang island. It stars an entirely new cast which includes a returning Lee Seo-jin alongside Yoon Kyun-sang and Eric Mun from Shinhwa. Viewers were impressed by Eric Mun, who showed unexpected cooking skills and fishing expertise.

Na later said that his rural upbringing in Cheongju, North Chungcheong Province influenced his work ("I'm the perfect opposite of trendy and sophisticated"), and that he specializes in reality shows because he "can take a story from anyone" by editing footage given to him by cameramen and making any story out of it. He said, "Everyone has their own personality and their view on life, which naturally creates stories when they are put together with other people. [...] The viewer ratings can always decline. I don't want to make a fancy reality show where I just think about the ratings. I want to keep my tone when I make a reality show."

==== Three Meals a Day: Sea Ranch ====
The show's seventh season, was filmed in Deungnyangdo, a remote island near the sea. Unlike its previous concept where members had to grow and cook their own food, the show featured a more laid-back concept where members were tasked to deliver fresh milk from mountain goats to the people on the island.

==== New Journey to the West ====
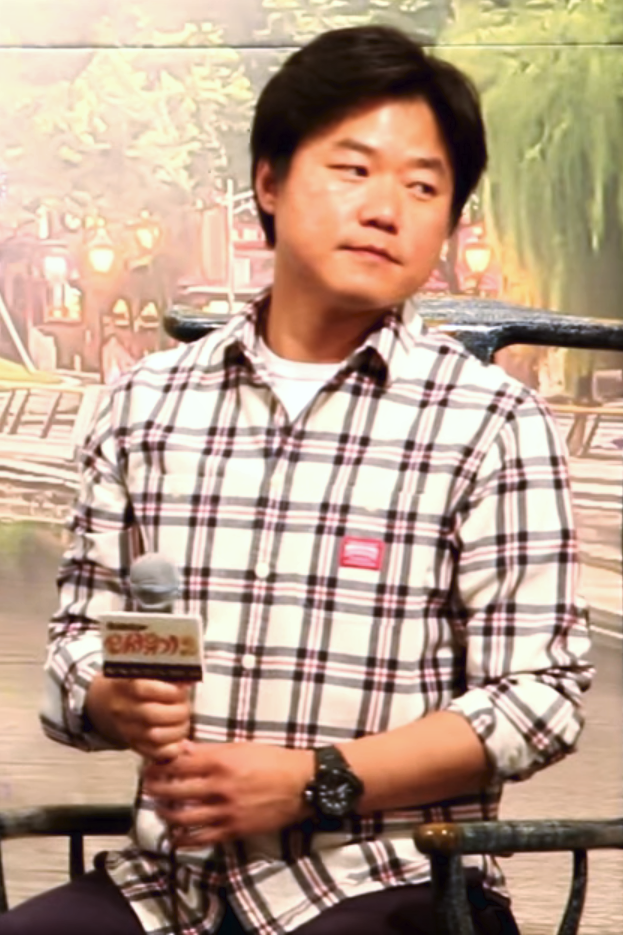
Na during a presentation for New Journey to the West 2, 2016

Na then reunited with his former 2 Days & 1 Night stars Lee Seung-gi, Kang Ho-dong, Eun Ji-won and Lee Soo-geun, as the quartet took on characters from the 16th century classic Chinese novel Journey to the West and traveled for five days through Xi'an, once the capital of China during the Tang dynasty. New Journey to the West was the first project of tvN Go (the cable channel's digital content brand), and it was unprecedented for a variety show to be distributed solely through online streaming (on the web portals Naver TV Cast and QQ). Instead of the usual one-hour episode length, each uploaded video clip lasted from five to ten minutes, and the Internet provided freedom from broadcast television's restrictions, such as a ban on indirect advertising of certain brands and adult language (including references to the tax evasion and illegal gambling controversies Kang and Lee, respectively, had been involved in). The show was a success with over 42 million views on Naver TV Cast and 10 million views on Chinese portal site QQ.

The second season of the show was filmed in Chengdu, which included a new cast member Ahn Jae-hyun (replacing Lee Seung Gi who left for military conscription). Aside from airing on online platforms, the show was now aired on cable channel tvN. It garnered over 100 million views in China. The third season of the show, added boy band members Kyuhyun and Song Min-ho and was filmed in Guilin. The fourth season of the show was filmed in Vietnam. The fifth season was filmed in Hong Kong with a new member P.O (Pyo Ji-hoon Block B). Then, it is continuously aired the sixth season that was filmed in Hokkaido. Ahn Jae-hyun was not shown in the seventh season due to his personal family issue, this season was all filmed in South Korea

==== Youn's Kitchen ====
In 2017, Na decided to introduce a new program which focuses on a group of South Korean celebrities (Youn Yuh-jung, Lee Seo-jin, Park Seo-joon and Jung Yu-mi) operating a small Korean cuisine restaurant on a small island overseas. Season 1 was filmed in Indonesia; while Season 2 was filmed in Spain. Na said that the show aims to fulfill people's fantasy of running a mom-and-pop restaurant in a foreign country. The series was a huge success, with its second season garnering 16% ratings, a record high for an entertainment show on a cable channel. It also helped spread a social trend among young Koreans of trying to break away from a lifestyle devoted to work and money and embracing the motto YOLO ("You Only Live Once").

==== Kang's Kitchen ====
Kang's Kitchen is a spin-off of Na's other program New Journey to the West, which features the cast running a pork cutlet restaurant on Jeju Island. Na PD is shy.

==== Trivia ====
Also known as the dictionary of useless knowledge, is a show that's already in its third season, airing on TVN.

==== Little Cabin in the Woods ====
After the success of Youn's Kitchen, Na was allowed to create a program of his own choice. Na thus decided to create a documentary-formatted program which follows two celebrities' (So Ji-sub and Park Shin-hye) off-grid lives in a house in the middle of the woods in Jeju Island; out of reach of technology and people. There, the cast members are required to fill their day by completing missions and doing such basic chores as cooking, making a fire and chopping firewood. Na explained that he created the show to show busy people in the cities that there is a slow-paced and more leisurely way of life. In line with his philosophy of creating his previous programs, Little Cabin in the Woods was created on the premise that TV viewers take great comfort by watching celebrities living slow-paced, peaceful lives.

==== Youn's Stay ====
Youn's Stay is Youn's third series, an entertainment program in which Korean celebrities (Youn Yuh-jung, Lee Seo-jin, Jung Yu-mi, Park Seo-joon, and Choi Woo-shik) run accommodations in Gurye-gun, Jeollanam-do, Korea.

==== Earth Arcade ====
Earth Arcade is producer Na Young-seok's new travel variety show that aired in 2022. The first season took place in Thailand, with the first shooting in Bangkok, the second shooting in Ko Samui Island, and the third shooting in Khlong Sok National Park. The second season took place in Finland with the first shooting in [Helsinki] and the second shooting [in Rovaniemi] and the third shooting in [Bali] Indonesia. Korean celebrities (Lee Eun-ji, Mimi, Lee Young-ji, and An Yu-jin) appeared, and both the program and the cast gained high popularity.

==== Nana Tour ====
A spin-off of Youth Over Flowers (2014–2019), the show was restructured to allow Seventeen to have a proper rest. Instead of leaving them to their own devices, the group enjoys an all-inclusive package tour in Italy. Kidnapped by producer Na Yeong-seok (Na PD), the cast embarks on a seven-day trip to Italy, minus the exhaustion. Their first group trip to Europe, that they abruptly embarked on after a concert, feels like a holiday of sorts, with a package tour full of additional services tailored to Seventeen—a travelog of Seventeen, by Seventeen, for Seventeen Nana Tour with Seventeen premiered domestically on cable channel tvN and its platform streaming service TVING from January 5 to February 16, 2024. Extended cuts of the 6 episodes were released worldwide via Weverse on the same days.

==== Nana BnB ====
A spin off of Nana Tour, Nana Bnb once again includes a kidnapping of the cast, Seventeen, in the middle of shooting a fake content and getting whisked away to Boeun, Chungcheongnam-do to a traditional rural Minbak (bnb), where they must make at least 3 meals a day and must do so using wood fired ovens and cauldrons. It started airing on six different platforms from June 2, 2025.

== Personal life ==
Na Young-seok married his wife, a home shopping PD, in 2011. They have a daughter.

== Philanthropy ==
In January 2023, Na became the first donor in Chungcheongbuk-do to donate 5 million won, the highest donation amount since the Love Homeland Donation System was implemented.

== Filmography ==
Ref:

=== Variety shows ===
Year	Title		Network	Credited as		Ref.
Year	English	Korean	Network	Assistant Director	Director	Ref.
2001–2003	Declaration of Freedom Today is Saturday – The War Of Roses	자유선언 토요대작전 - 산장미팅 장미의 전쟁	KBS2	Yes	No	
2001–2003	Super TV Sunday is Fun — Let's Go! Dream Team - Season 1	슈퍼 TV 일요일은 즐거워 — 출발드림팀 시즌1	KBS2	Yes	No	
2004–2010	Star Golden Bell	스타골든벨	KBS2	No	Yes	
2004–2005	Happy Sunday: Heroine 5 (Note: The show originally aired from April 4, 2004, to May 1, 2005)	여걸파이브	KBS2	Yes	No	
2005–2007	Happy Sunday: Heroine 6 (Note: The show originally aired from May 8, 2005, to April 29, 2007)	여걸식스	KBS2	Yes	No	
2007–2008	Happy Sunday: High-Five	하이파이브	KBS2	No	Yes	
2007	Happy Sunday: Are You Ready? (Note: The program originally aired on May 6, 2007, and ended on July 29, 2007)	해피선데이 — 준비했어요	KBS2	No	Yes	
2007–2012	Happy Sunday: 2 Days 1 Night Season 1 (Note: Season 1 premiered on August 5, 2007, and ended on February 26, 2012)	1박 2일	KBS2	No	Yes	
2012	Happy Sunday: The Human Condition (Pilot episode)	남자의 자격	KBS2	No	Yes	
2013–2018	Grandpas Over Flowers (Season 1 – 5)	꽃보다 할배	tvN	No	Yes	
2013–2014	Sisters Over Flowers	꽃보다 누나	tvN	No	Yes	
2014–2018	Youth Over Flowers (Season 1 – 5)	꽃보다 청춘	tvN	No	Yes	
2014–2021	Three Meals a Day (Season 1 – 10)	삼시세끼	tvN	No	Yes	
2015	Chok Chok Oppa		tvN	No	Yes	
2015–2020	New Journey to the West (Season 1 – 8)	신서유기	Naver TV Cast, tvN	No	Yes	
2016	Around the World in Eighty Days	80일간의 세계일주	tvN	No	Yes	
2017	Newlywed Diaries (Season 1 – 2)	신혼일기	tvN	No	Yes	
2017–2018	The Dictionary Of Useless Knowledge (Season 1 – 3)	알아두면 쓸데없는 신비한 잡학사전	tvN	No	Yes	
2017–2018	Youn's Kitchen (Season 1 – 2)	윤식당	tvN	No	Yes	
2017–2019	Kang's Kitchen (Season 1 – 3)	강식당	tvN	No	Yes	
2018	Little Cabin in the Woods	숲속의 작은 집 만들기	tvN	No	Yes	
2019	Coffee Friends	커피프렌즈	tvN	No	Yes	
2019	Korean Hostel in Spain	스페인 하숙	tvN	No	Yes	
2019	Three Meals a Day in Iceland	삼시세끼 - 아이슬란드 간 세끼	tvN	No	Yes	
2019–2020	The Ramyeonator	라끼남: 라면 끼리는 남자	tvN	No	Yes	
2020	Friday Joy Package	금요일 금요일 밤에	tvN	No	Yes	
2020	Mapo Hipster	마포 멋쟁이	tvN	No	Yes	
2020	Three Meals for Four	삼시네세끼	tvN	No	Yes	
2020	Summer Vacation	여름방학	tvN	No	Yes	
2020	Lee's Kitchen	나홀로 이식당	tvN	No	Yes	
2020–present	Things That Make Me Groove	내 어깨를 봐 탈골됐잖아	tvN	No	Yes	
2021	Youn's Stay	윤스테이	tvN	No	Yes	
2021	Don't Look Back	뒤돌아보지 말아요 만들기	tvN	No	Yes	
2021	The Devils Wear Jung Nam (Season 1 & 2)	악마는 정남이를 입는다	tvN	No	Yes	
2021	Hospital Playlist Goes Camping	슬기로운 캠핑생활	tvN	No	Yes	
2021	Athletic Genius Ahn Jae Hyun	운동천재 안재현	tvN	No	Yes	
2021	Spring Camp	신서유기 스페셜 스프링 캠프	TVING	No	Yes	
2021–present	The Game Caterers	출장 십오야	tvN	No	Yes	
2022	Unexpected Journey	뜻밖의 여정	tvN	No	Yes	
2022	Earth Arcade (Season 1 – 3)	뿅뿅 지구오락실	tvN	No	Yes	
2023	Jinny's Kitchen (Season 1 – 2)	서진이네	tvN	No	Yes	
2024	Go Together NaNa Tour	함께가요 나나투어	tvN	No	Yes	
2025–2026	Reply 1988 10th Anniversary	응답하라 1988 10주년	tvN			

=== Acting cameos ===
Year	Title	Note
2013	Reply 1994	Episode 2
2014	Potato Star 2013QR3	Episode 66
2021	Hospital Playlist 2	Episode 10
2022	Behind Every Star	Episode 9
2025	Resident Playbook	Episode 9

=== Web shows ===
Year	Title	Role	Notes	Ref.
2022	Incheon Landing Operation, The Light of Victory, Palmido	Narrator	historical documentary	

== Books ==
Books written by Na
Year	Title		Author	Publisher	Published Date	ISBN	Ref.
Year	English	Korean	Author	Publisher	Published Date	ISBN	Ref.
2005	PD, Who & How	대세를 만드는 크리에이티브	co-author	Consonants and Vowels	2015-04-29	978-8-9544-3155-2	
2012	Anyway, the Race Is Long	어차피 레이스는 길다 다시 시작하는 사람들에게,마흔을 준비하는 100일의 휴가	Na Young-seok	Munhakdongne	2012-12-03	978-8-9546-5088-5	
2018	Anyway, the Race Is Long	나영석 피디의 어차피 레이스는 길다 어딘가로 달리고 있는 이들에게	Na Young-seok	Munhakdongne	2018-04-13	978-8-9546-1990-5	

== Lecture/Seminar ==
- 2014 — 'Na Young-seok PD's Creative Lecture Over Flowers' held on May 22 at the M Academy headquarters in Nonhyeon-dong, Gangnam District, Seoul.
- 2015 — Youth Hope Fund Ground Lecture

== Accolades ==
=== Awards and nominations ===
Year	Ceremony	Category	Work	Result	Ref.
2009	21st Korean PD Awards	Best Production, TV Entertainment category	2 Days & 1 Night	Won	
2011	38th Korea Broadcasting Awards	Best Production, TV Entertainment category	2 Days & 1 Night	Won	
2013	6th Style Icon Awards	Special Award	—N/a	Won	
2014	50th Baeksang Arts Awards	Best Production, TV Entertainment category	Three Meals a Day	Won	
2015	9th Cable TV Broadcasting Awards	Best Production in Creative Content category; Special Award	Three Meals a Day	Won	
2015	51st Baeksang Arts Awards	Grand Prize – Television	Grandpas Over Flowers, Three Meals a Day	Won	
2023	CJ ENM Visionary	2023 Visionary	Na Yeong-seok	Won	
2024	Baeksang Arts Awards	Best Male Variety Performer	Na Yeong-seok	Won	

=== State honors ===
Name of country, year given, and name of honor
Country	Award Ceremony	Year	Honor	Ref.
South Korea	10th Anniversary of Mountain Day	2011	Prime Minister's Commendation	
South Korea	Korean Content Awards (Note: Honors are given at the Korean Content Awards (대한민국 콘텐츠 대상) arranged by the Korea Creative Content Agency and hosted by the Ministry of Culture, Sports and Tourism. The 2022 Korea Content Awards Ceremony, which started in 2009 and celebrated its 14th this year, aims to inspire pride in the content industry and develop the Korean cultural content industry by discovering and awarding contributors and excellent content that have contributed to the development of the content industry in 2022. It is a place to promote. The winners (works) of honor, which are recommended through the website of the Korea Creative Content Agency (www.kocca.kr) and announced through careful examination by experts and three-step verification, play a leading role in shining the Korean content industry in the world.)	2021	Cultural Award	
South Korea	Korean Popular Culture and Arts Awards	2014	Prime Minister's Commendation	

=== Listicles ===
Name of publisher, year listed, name of listicle, and placement
Publisher	Year	Listicle	Placement	Ref.
Canon Korea	2023	Canon Master (Note: Canon Masters', which started in 2015, is a program that selects the best experts in the field of photography and video in Korea and supports Canon's various products, technologies, and services so that they can actively promote their work.)	Top 9	
Etoday	2015	Etoday 'Star Success Engineering'	Top 12 (Note: with Jang Keun-suk, Song Hye-kyo, Son Ye-jin, Kim Tae-hee, Jang Na-ra, Ha Jung-woo, Lee Seung-gi, Lee Min-ho, Seo In-guk, Bae Suzy, Kim Woo-bin)	
Forbes	2014	30 Celebrities CEOs Want to Meet	3rd	
Forbes	2015	4th Forbes Korea 30 Young Power Leaders	Top 30	
Hankook Ilbo	2015	Hankook Ilbo Top 10 Influential Figures	3rd	
Herald Economy	2013	Pop Culture Power Leader Big 30	13th	
Herald Economy	2014	Pop Culture Power Leader Big 30	6th	
Herald Economy	2015	Pop Culture Power Leader Big 30	3rd	
Lady Kyunghyang	2014	Best of the Year — Entertainment Show	Top 3	
KBS	2023	The 50 people who made KBS shine	19th	
Sisa Journal (Note: Sisa Journal Next Generation Leader-Society was founded by Sisa Journal in 2008.)	2011	Variety program MC	8th	
Sisa Journal	2015	Next Generation Leader — Pop Culture	2nd	
Sisa Journal	2015	Next Generation Leader 100	39th	
Sisa Journal	2017	Person of the Year	Placed	
Sisa Journal	2017	Korea's Most Influential Cultural Artists	4th	
Sisa Journal	2017	Korea's Most Influential Person in Broadcasting & Entertainment	4th	
Sisa Journal	2017	Next Generation Leader — Society	12th	
Sisa Journal	2017	Next Generation Leader — Culture, Arts, Sports	19th	
Sisa Journal	2018	Next Generation Leader — Society	12th	
Sisa Journal	2020	Most Influential Person in Broadcasting & Entertainment	9th	
Sisa Journal	2021	Person of the Year — Culture	8th	
Sisa Journal	2022	Most Influential Person in Culture and Arts	8th	
Sisa Journal	2023	Most Influential Person in Broadcasting & Entertainment	7th	

== See also ==
- Lee Myung-han
- Lee Woo-jung
- Shin Won-ho
