= CJ ENM Visionary =

Annual South Korean entertainment award

CJ ENM Visionary Award
- Description: Award recognizing innovation and global impact in Korean content
- Country: South Korea
- Hosted by: CJ ENM
- First award: 2020
- Website: www.cjenm.com

Presented annually by entertainment company CJ ENM, the CJ ENM Visionary award recognizes individuals, creative works, and intellectual properties identified by the company for their influence on the entertainment industry. The ceremony is held at the CJ ENM Center in Seoul and honors contributions that introduce new perspectives, demonstrate originality, and contribute to the distribution of Korean content globally.

== History ==
The award was established in 2020 to acknowledge industry pioneers. By 2026, the criteria were expanded to include specific intellectual properties evaluated for their global scalability and adherence to set production standards.

== Recipients ==
=== Visionaries ===
Year	Intellectual Properties	Pioneer	Ref.
2020	—N/a	BTS (Group); Kim Eun-hee (Writer) – Kingdom; Kim Tae-ho (Producer) – Reality Universe; BLACKPINK (Group) – Music/Global Impact; Bong Joon-ho (Director) – Parasite; Park Ji-eun (Writer) – Crash Landing on You; RAIN (Singer/Actor) – Meme Syndrome; Shin Won-ho (Director) – Hospital Playlist; Song Kang-ho (Actor) – Parasite; Yoo Jae-suk (Entertainer)	
2021	—N/a	BTS (Group); Aespa (Group); Yoo Jae-suk (Comedian / Television Host); Youn Yuh-jung (Actress) – Minari; Choi Jeong-nam (Director / Producer) – Street Woman Fighter; Hwang Dong-hyuk (Creator / Director) – Squid Game	
2023	—N/a	(G)I-DLE (Group); IU (Singer-Actress); Kim Hye-soo (Actress); Lee Jung-jae (Actor/Director) – Squid Game, Hunt; Park Chan-wook (Director) – Decision to Leave; Chung Seo-kyung (Writer) – Little Women, Decision to Leave; Na Young-seok (Director/Producer) – Earth Arcade; Ma Dong-seok (Actor/Producer); Park Eun-bin (Actress) – Extraordinary Attorney Woo; Lee Jin-ju (Director/Producer) – EXchange	
2024	—N/a	Kang Full (Writer) – Moving; Kim Yong-hoon (Director) – Mask Girl; Monika (Dancer) – Street Woman Fighter; Ryu Seung-ryong (Actor) – Moving; Song Hye-kyo (Actress) – The Glory; Stray Kids (Group) – Global Music Performance; Uhm Jung-hwa (Actress) – Acting/Music Career	
2026	Bon Appétit, Your Majesty	Jang Tae-yoo (Director); Lim YoonA (Actress); Lee Chae-min (Actor)	
2026	Boys II Planet	Kim Shin-young (Producer); ALPHA DRIVE ONE (Participant)	
2026	Marry My Husband	Sohn Jay (Producer); Park Min-young (Actress); Takeru Satoh (Actor)	
2026	Our Unwritten Seoul	Lee Kang (Writer); Park Bo-young (Actress)	
2026	Severance	Nicholas Weinstock (Producer); Adam Scott (Actor)	
2026	Study Group	Lee Jang-hoon (Director); Hwang Min-hyun (Actor)	

=== Visionary selection ===
30th Anniversary Visionary Selection
Category	Selection
Movie	Joint Security Area
Movie	Parasite
Movie	Snowpiercer
Movie	Veteran
Drama	Dear My Friends
Drama	Guardian: The Lonely and Great God
Drama	My Mister
Drama	Reply Series
Drama	Signal
Music show	MAMA Awards
Music show	Superstar K
Music show	Show Me the Money
Music show	Street Woman Fighter
Entertainment Show	Grandpas Over Flowers
Entertainment Show	New Journey to the West
Entertainment Show	You Quiz on the Block
Musical	Kinky Boots the Musical

== See also ==
- CJ ENM
