= Go Back (TV series) =

South Korean television series

- Promotional poster
- Also known as: Go Back Couple; Couple on the Backtrack; Confession Couple
- Hangul: 고백부부
- RR: Gobaekbubu
- MR: Kobaekpubu
- Genre: Romance; Comedy; Drama
- Based on: Do it one more time (한번 더 해요) by Hong Seung-pyo and Kim Hye-yeon
- Developed by: KBS Drama Production
- Written by: Kwon Hye-joo
- Directed by: Ha Byung-hoon
- Starring: Son Ho-jun; Jang Na-ra
- Country of origin: South Korea
- Original language: Korean
- No. of episodes: 12

Production
- Executive producers: Ha Won; Han Suk-won
- Producers: Son Soo-chun; Yoo Woong-shik
- Running time: 70 min
- Production companies: Confession Couple S.P.C.; KBS N; ZIUM Content Co. Ltd.

Original release
- Network: KBS2
- Release: October 13 – November 18, 2017

Go Back (Korean: 고백부부; RR: Gobaekbubu; lit. 'Go Back Couple') is a 2017 South Korean television series starring Son Ho-jun and Jang Na-ra. It premiered on October 13 to November 18, 2017, and aired every Friday and Saturday at 23:00 (KST) on KBS2.

The series was based on the Naver webtoon series Do it one more time (한번 더 해요; Hanbeon deo haeyo) by Hong Seung-pyo (a.k.a. Miti) and Kim Hye-yeon (a.k.a. Gugu), which was first published online in 2016.

== Plot ==
Choi Ban-do (Son Ho-jun) and Ma Jin-joo (Jang Na-ra) are both 38 years old and married with a little son. Both are struggling through daily lives that leave them exhausted and unhappy. Ban-do is a pharmaceutical salesman who spends his days begging people to buy his medicines, and his evenings either drinking with prospective clients, or helping an arrogant and cruel hospital director, Park Hyun-suk (Im Ji-kyu), hide the fact that he is cheating on his wealthy wife. Jin-joo is a housewife who raises their son while struggling to find meaning in her life, and feels lonely and abandoned by Ban-do. After coming to a breaking point in their relationship, Ban-do and Jin-joo wake up to find themselves as 20-year-old university students. They don't know why they are there or how long they will stay, so they decide to enjoy it and make different choices than they did the first time around. These decisions impact their families and friends.

== Cast ==
=== Main ===
- Son Ho-jun as Choi Ban-do

A pharmaceutical salesman and Ma Jin-joo's husband. He was a Civil Engineering student at Hankook University. However, after he graduated and got married, he started working as a pharmaceutical salesman, begging doctors and directors to buy his products, even willing to spend more money for his clients at bars, do menial jobs, and even be bullied by them. Furthermore, one of his cruel clients pays him to hide his younger nurse mistresses from his wife by using credit cards under his name, with various hotels and motels listed on the bill. One day, feeling exhausted from the cruel treatments from his clients and consistent naggings from Jin-joo, he agrees to his wife's divorce plea, wishing that they had never met each other.

- Jang Na-ra as Ma Jin-joo

A homemaker and Choi Ban-do's wife for more than 10 years. She was a History student at Hankook University. She used to be germophobic, but after becoming a homemaker, her hygiene deteriorates to the extent of willing to eat her son's food that he can't bite, wearing stained outfits most of the time, and becoming gluttonous, eating at a faster pace than the average person. At first she was happy in her marriage, but after some years she started to feel exhausted and unhappy with her situation of being a homemaker, wishing herself to have a better job and income. She also feels that Ban-do starts abandoning her in term of affection and finances, believing that he is a cheap person. After a misunderstanding one night, she wishes to go back to the time when she had never met him, and files for a divorce while demanding alimony for herself and their son, Seo-jin.

=== Supporting ===
==== People around Ban-do ====
- Heo Jung-min as Ahn Jae-woo

Ban-do's classmate in the civil engineering department. He is a weakling and provides comic relief, but tries to change due to his love for Yoon Bo Reum.

- Lee Yi-kyung as Go Dok-jae

Ban-do's classmate in the civil engineering department. He has long hair and a bright and charming personality, but is naive and a little dumb.

- Go Bo-gyeol as Min Seo-young

A ballet major who Ban-do admired, but was too shy to approach in the past.

- Im Ji-kyu as Park Hyun-suk

Ban-do's senior at university in the medicine department. In the present, he is the director of a hospital. A very cruel person, he used to use his innocent looks to cheat on his girlfriend — his wife in the present — that he loves only for her family's wealthy background. He continues his old habit of seducing younger and prettier nurses in the present, even using Choi Ban-do's credit card to hide his mistresses at hotels and motels.

- Lee Do-yeon as Kim Ye-Rim, girlfriend/wife of Park Hyun-suk in the past/present, who comes from a wealthy family.
- Kim Byeong-ok as Choi Gi-il, Ban-do's father
- Jo Ryun as Kang Kyung-sook, Ban-do's mother
- Go Eun-min as Choi Ja-yeon

Ban-do's sister. She bullies her brother, but also stands up for him.

==== People around Jin-joo ====
- Han Bo-reum as Yoon Bo-reum

Jin-joo's best friend in university, now an aerobics instructor. She is a former university cheerleader with an easygoing personality, and a high tolerance for alcohol.

- Cho Hye-jung as Chun Seol

Jin-joo's best friend in university. She has an innocent and a goody-two-shoes appearance, but can be an oddball who makes sarcastic remarks.

- Jang Ki-yong as Jung Nam-gil

An ROTC candidate and popular upperclassman in the same history department as Jin-joo. While all other university females fawn over him, he has a one-sided crush on Jin-joo.

- Lee Byung-joon as Ma Pan-suk, Jin-joo's father
- Kim Mi-kyung as Go Eun-sook, Jin-joo's mother, who has diabetes.
- Cha Min-ji as Ma Eun-joo, Jin-Joo's elder sister

=== Special appearance ===
- Kim Hyun-mok as Broadcasting student
- Yang Dae-hyuk as Senior of history department
- Seo Woo-jin as Cameo
- Jung Yun-ho
- Lee Sang-min
- Lee Hwi-jae
- Yang Ji-won
- Kim Ki-doo as Soldier (Ep.6)
- Seo Woo-jin as Seo-jin running baby on the bridge (Ep.2)

== Production ==
The drama, directed and written by the production team of The Sound of Your Heart, is the first production of Zium Content, the production company founded by ex-KBS drama producer Han Seok-won (Hwarang: The Poet Warrior Youth) in early 2017. It was co-produced by KBS N.

== Original soundtrack ==
Confession Couple Special OST

Soundtrack album by Various Artists
- Released: November 20, 2017
- Genres: Soundtrack, Ballad
- Languages: Korean; English
- Label: NHN Bugs

The soundtrack released on November 20, 2017 for the Korean drama of the same name. The CD 1 composed of 7 tracks which was released as a single while the CD 2 released as a track on the album.

=== Part 1 ===
Released on October 14, 2017
No.	Title	Lyrics	Music	Artist	Length
1.	"Go Back"	Moon Seong-nam, Jung Jae-woo	Moon Seong-nam, Jung Jae-woo	Every Single Day	3:34
2.	"Go Back" (Inst.)		Moon Seong-nam, Jung Jae-woo		3:34
Total length:					7:08

=== Part 2 ===
Released on October 21, 2017
No.	Title	Lyrics	Music	Artist	Length
1.	"Wind Song" (바람의 노래)	Kim Soon-gon	Kim Jung-wook	Sohyang	4:21
2.	"Wind Song" (Inst.)		Kim Jung-wook		4:21
Total length:					8:42

=== Part 3 ===
Released on October 28, 2017
No.	Title	Lyrics	Music	Artist	Length
1.	"Dream"	Honey Jar	Honey Jar	Lucia	4:07
2.	"Dream" (Inst.)		Honey Jar		4:07
Total length:					8:14

=== Part 4 ===
Released on October 29, 2017
No.	Title	Lyrics	Music	Artist	Length
1.	"Confession" (고백)	Yoda	Kim Se-jin, Midnight	Choi Nakta	3:47
2.	"Confession" (Inst.)		Kim Se-jin, Midnight		3:47
Total length:					7:34

=== Part 5 ===
Released on November 4, 2017
No.	Title	Lyrics	Music	Artist	Length
1.	"You and I" (우리라는 세상)	Ho Kyung-kim, 1601	1601	Lee Seok-hoon	4:12
2.	"You and I" (Inst.)		1601		4:12
Total length:					8:24

=== Part 6 ===
Released on November 11, 2017
No.	Title	Lyrics	Music	Artist	Length
1.	"AMAZING"	earattack	earattack, monster factory	Hong Dae-kwang	3:38
2.	"AMAZING" (Inst.)		earattack, monster factory		3:38
Total length:					7:16

=== Part 7 ===
Released on November 18, 2017
No.	Title	Lyrics	Music	Artist	Length
1.	"Perfect Life"	Moon Seong-nam, Jung Jae-woo, Lim Seong-muk	Moon Seong-nam, Jung Jae-woo	Every Single Day feat. Mxxg	3:40
2.	"Perfect Life" (Inst.)		Moon Seong-nam, Jeong Jae-woo		3:40
Total length:					7:20

=== CD 2 ===
No.	Title	Artist	Length
1.	"Go Back Strings"	Moon Seong-nam, Jung Jae-woo, Moon Kyu-hyuk	3:57
2.	"Baam"	Jung Cha-sik	3:15
3.	"Cartoon Comics"	Kang Hwi-chan	2:38
4.	"Dang It"	Jung Jae-woo	2:25
5.	"Go Back Waltz"	Moon Sung-nam (Every Single Day)	2:29
6.	"Devils Destiny"	Lee Kyung-sik	2:20
7.	"Dream Girl Strings"	Moon Sung-nam (Every Single Day)	4:00
8.	"Dumb Chase"	Romantisco	2:54
9.	"Fakery"	Romantisco	2:50
10.	"First Romance"	Romantisco	3:02
11.	"Go Back Gt. Fun"	Moon Sung-nam (Every Single Day), Jung Jae-woo	2:34
12.	"Good Day Pizzi"	Moon Sung-nam (Every Single Day)	1:47
13.	"House Mouse"	Romantisco	2:57
14.	"Master Slave"	Kang Hwi-chan	0:31
15.	"Go Back Happy"	Moon Sung-nam (Every Single Day)	1:37
16.	"Meaning"	Lee Kyung-sik	2:11
17.	"Mess Up"	Jung Jae-woo	1:51
18.	"Now We Are Strings"	Moon Sung-nam (Every Single Day)	3:34
19.	"Over There"	Jung Cha-sik	2:22
20.	"Peer"	Lee Kyung-sik	2:40
21.	"Perfect Life Comic"	Moon Sung-nam (Every Single Day)	1:43
22.	"Reggae Party"	Jung Cha-sik	2:04
23.	"Romantic Swing"	Kang Hwi-chan	1:26
24.	"Still Here"	Moon Sung-nam (Every Single Day)	2:03
25.	"Ting"	Lee Kyung-sik	2:36
26.	"Tired"	Jung Jae-woo	2:17
27.	"Viewing The Moon"	Kang Hwi-chan	1:11

=== Chart performance ===
==== Album chart ====
Title	Artist	Year	Peak chart positions	Chart link
고백부부 OST	Various	2017	44	

==== Digital chart ====
Title	Year	Peak chart positions	Sales	Remarks
Title	Year	Gaon	Sales	Remarks
"Wind Song" Sohyang (소향)	2017	51	KOR: 69,029+	Part 2

== Ratings ==
- In this table, the blue numbers represent the lowest ratings and the red numbers represent the highest ratings.
- NR denotes that the drama did not rank in the Top 20 daily rankings.

Ep.	Broadcast Date	Average audience share			
Ep.	Broadcast Date	TNmS Ratings		AGB Nielsen Ratings	
Ep.	Broadcast Date	Nationwide	Seoul	Nationwide	Seoul
1	October 13, 2017	5.2% (20th)	5.5% (19th)	4.6% (NR)	5.3% (NR)
2	October 14, 2017	6.1% (NR)	6.4% (13th)	6.0% (NR)	6.6% (15th)
3	October 20, 2017	4.9% (NR)	5.5% (20th)	5.2% (NR)	5.4% (NR)
4	October 21, 2017	5.3% (NR)	6.0% (16th)	4.8% (NR)	5.5% (NR)
5	October 27, 2017	5.3% (NR)	5.4% (19th)	5.5% (19th)	5.8% (20th)
6	October 28, 2017	5.2% (NR)	5.6% (14th)	5.5% (NR)	6.0% (20th)
7	November 3, 2017	6.1% (18th)	6.3% (17th)	5.8% (17th)	5.8% (18th)
8	November 4, 2017	5.5% (19th)	6.3% (12th)	6.7% (12th)	7.1% (12th)
9	November 10, 2017	6.9% (17th)	7.3% (14th)	6.5% (16th)	6.4% (15th)
10	November 11, 2017	6.9% (12th)	7.9% (6th)	6.0% (18th)	5.5% (20th)
11	November 17, 2017	6.6% (17th)	7.0% (15th)	5.4% (20th)	5.7% (19th)
12	November 18, 2017	7.6% (10th)	7.9% (6th)	7.3% (11th)	7.6% (11th)
Average		6.0%	6.4%	5.8%	6.1%

== Awards and nominations ==
Year	Award	Category	Recipient	Result	Ref.
2017	31st KBS Drama Awards	Top Excellence Award, Actress	Jang Na-ra	Nominated	
2017	31st KBS Drama Awards	Excellence Award, Actress in a Miniseries	Jang Na-ra	Won	
2017	31st KBS Drama Awards	Netizen Award - Female	Jang Na-ra	Nominated	
2017	31st KBS Drama Awards	Excellence Award, Actor in a Miniseries	Son Ho-jun	Nominated	
2017	31st KBS Drama Awards	Netizen Award - Male	Son Ho-jun	Nominated	
2017	31st KBS Drama Awards	Best New Actor	Jang Ki-yong	Nominated	
2017	31st KBS Drama Awards	Best Couple Award	Jang Na-ra and Son Ho-jun	Won	
2018	6th APAN Star Awards	Excellence Award, Actress in a Miniseries	Jang Na-ra	Nominated	
