= Nana Tour with Seventeen =

South Korean travel-reality television show

- Promotional poster
- Also known as: Go together! Nana Tour with Seventeen
- Hangul: 함께가요 나나투어 with 세븐틴
- RR: Hamkkegayo nanatueo with Sebeuntin
- MR: Hamkkegayo nanat'uŏ with Sebŭnt'in
- Genre: Travel-reality show
- Written by: Choi Jae Young
- Directed by: Na Yeong-seok; Shin Hyo-jung; Jang Eun-jung
- Starring: Seventeen
- Opening theme: "Nana Tour with Seventeen" performed by Seventeen
- Country of origin: South Korea
- Original language: Korean
- No. of seasons: 1
- No. of episodes: 6

Production
- Production locations: Japan (Tokyo); Italy (Rome, Panzano, Porto Venere); South Korea (Note: S.Coups was recovering from an injury at the time, so he stayed in South Korea but appeared in the show through video calls and interviews in some episodes. He appears in episodes 1, 2, 4 and is only mentioned and/or represented by a picture in episodes 3, 5 and 6.)
- Running time: 70 minutes (edited version on tvN) – 120 minutes (extended version on Weverse)
- Production companies: Egg Is Coming; Hybe

Original release
- Network: tvN
- Release: January 5 – February 16, 2024

Related
- Youth Over Flowers

Nana Tour with Seventeen (also known simply as Nana Tour or its full title Go Together! Nana Tour with Seventeen; Korean: 함께가요 나나투어 with 세븐틴) is a South Korean television travel-reality show starring boy group Seventeen.

A spin-off of Youth Over Flowers (2014–2019), the show was restructured to allow Seventeen to have a proper rest. Instead of leaving them to their own devices, the group enjoys an all-inclusive package tour in Italy. Nana Tour with Seventeen premiered domestically on cable channel tvN and its platform streaming service TVING from January 5 to February 16, 2024. Extended cuts of the 6 episodes were released worldwide via Weverse on the same days.

A spin-off titled Nana BnB with Seventeen aired in June 2025.

== Premise ==
Kidnapped by producer Na Yeong-seok (Na PD), the cast embarks on a seven-day trip to Italy, minus the exhaustion. Their first group trip to Europe, that they abruptly embarked on after a concert, feels like a holiday of sorts, with a package tour full of additional services tailored to Seventeen—a travelog of Seventeen, by Seventeen, for Seventeen.

== Cast ==
- Seventeen
  - S.Coups as himself
  - Jeonghan as himself
  - Joshua as himself
  - Jun as himself
  - Hoshi as himself
  - Wonwoo as himself
  - Woozi as himself
  - DK as himself
  - Mingyu as himself
  - The8 as himself
  - Seungkwan as himself
  - Vernon as himself
  - Dino as himself
- Special appearance of producers Na Yeong-seok (as Na PD) and Shin Hyo-jung, and writer Choi Jae-young

== Production ==
=== Background ===
In April 2023, Seventeen were guests on Na PD's variety show The Game Caterers. As a prize to a music quiz, Seventeen were divided into six teams and competed in a raffle, where each team wrote one wish on paper and put it in a bag containing 60 blank papers. Among the wishes, Wonwoo and Dino decided to request a season of Youth Over Flowers for Seventeen. On the second draw, DK pulled the paper containing the wish. The last draw by Seungkwan and Hoshi also corresponded to a wish to appear in one of Na PD's shows, but they decided to give it up since Youth Over Flowers already won.

=== Development ===
Right after The Game Caterers, the crew started to work on the project and planning a trip for the 13 members of Seventeen. To organize this, they only involved two staff members from Pledis and created a fake schedule to fool members. Chinese members The8 and Jun needed visas to visit Italy, so they also created a fake show supposed to be filmed in Rome, Italy, with the help of actor Yoo Yeon-seok.

Despite the high costs, Shin PD insisted on bringing the group to Italy to reward them for their hard work, and focused the show on a comfy atmosphere of close friends traveling together. The trip being more of a package tour than a field trip, so the show has been renamed Nana Tour.

=== Filming ===
Filming began with Na PD showing up in Seventeen's hotel in Tokyo following their Tokyo Dome concert on September 7, 2023. Although they were spotted at the Rome Airport in Italy on September 8, the production kept the filming secret to "ensure safe and smooth filming". On December 8, 2023, it was revealed that it took place during a 6-night, 7-day trip to Italy.

== Release ==
The show was broadcast on South Korean cable channel tvN and its platform streaming service TVING from January 5 to February 16, 2024. The last episode was postponed by a week due to Lunar New Year holidays on February 9. On the same days, the extended versions were released worldwide via Weverse, with subtitles provided in six languages: Korean, English, Japanese, Simplified Chinese, Traditional Chinese, Indonesian.

In total, it was simultaneously broadcast in 12 countries including Japan and Southeast Asia.

== Episodes ==
Nana Tour with Seventeen episodes
No. overall	No. in season	Original release date	South Korea viewers (millions)
1	1	January 5, 2024	0.640
Na PD surprises Seventeen at their hotel after a Follow Tour concert in Tokyo to take them on a trip to Italy. With no bags allowed, the group quickly prepares for their flight. They arrive at Leonardo da Vinci Airport in the evening, take a bus to the Colosseum before going to a hotel for the night.
2	2	January 12, 2024	0.635
The group spends their first morning in Rome, waking up at their own pace and enjoy their breakfast in small groups. They then return to the Colosseum to visit the Arch of Constantine. On their way to Tuscany, they play quizzes with Na PD. In Tuscany, they go grocery shopping before cooking and eating together. The day ends with a game to decide which of the three activities they'll be participating in the next day: a hot air balloon tour at 5 AM, a Florence city tour at 10 AM, or a winery tour at 12 PM.
3	3	January 19, 2024	0.550
The games continue from the previous episode. Once the three groups are determined, they all go on their various activities the following day. They then all attend a wine festival in Greve in Chianti. In the evening, the members are assigned secret missions to complete in order to earn more spending money.
4	4	January 26, 2024	0.630
The secret missions are continued, with various members being successful. The following day, the group has a relaxed morning before playing a new game to determine who will go on each of the three activities for the day: a pasta cooking class, a tour of Pisa, and tasting award-winning gelato.
5	5	February 2, 2024	0.433
Seventeen put on a talent show, with various prizes to be won by the acts earning the highest number of votes. The next day, they leave Greve in Chianti and reach the final stop on their vacation, Forte dei Marmi.
6	6	February 16, 2024	0.492
The group reflect on their week in Italy. They eat a seafood meal and are recognized by fans. The next day, they explore Porto Venere, go on a boat tour, and swim in the sea.

== Reception ==
=== Critical response ===
Kim Heon-sik reviewed the show, commenting that it was a noticeable difference in premise from Na's other shows, with the stars being all idols instead of a mix of entertainers. Kim Ji-hye elaborated that while Seventeen could be considered "less accessible" than Na's other guests, Na himself expressed that it was intentional and he had faith in the group's popularity. Kang Ga-hee reviewed episode 5 for Herald Pop, describing the talent show as "cheerful and lively" proof of their skills.

=== Viewership and ratings ===
- In the table below,
  - the blue numbers marks the lowest ratings in each season and the red numbers marks the highest ratings.
  - the text in brackets () indicates the episode's position among top cable programs in terms of ratings.
- This show airs on a cable channel/pay TV which normally has a relatively smaller audience compared to free-to-air TV/public broadcasters (KBS, SBS, MBC & EBS).

==== Season 1 ====
Ep.	Broadcast date	AGB Nielsen	
Ep.	Broadcast date	Nationwide	Metropolitan
1	January 5, 2024	2.078% (2nd)	2.337% (1st)
2	January 12, 2024	2.147% (1st)	2.642% (1st)
3	January 19, 2024	1.955% (3rd)	2.214% (2nd)
4	January 26, 2024	1.901% (2nd)	2.154% (1st)
5	February 2, 2025	1.575% (6th)	1.822% (5th)
6	February 16, 2025	1.427% (2nd)	1.744% (1st)
Average		1.847%	2.152%

== Spin-off ==
On March 7, 2025, tvN announced that Seventeen and Na PD reunited for a new show, titled Nana BnB with Seventeen (나나민박; Nanaminbak; 'Nana's guesthouse'), with the concept of managing a BnB.

On May 9, 2025, it was revealed that the show comprises 3 episodes and is scheduled to be released starting June 2, 2025, domestically on both tvN and Disney+. The extended versions will be available simultaneously on Weverse, with 3 additional episodes being aired. In total, it will be released simultaneously in 78 countries and regions including countries in America and Europe, as well as Japan, India, and Thailand through 5 platforms including Lemino, Kocowa, and Channel K.

=== Casting ===
Once again, 12 out of 13 members are present, with Jeonghan being absent due to him fulfilling his mandatory military service. S.Coups, who could not travel in Nana Tour, is present.

=== Promotion ===
On March 10, 2025, Na PD and Seventeen went live on their filming location to celebrate the release of Hoshi X Woozi's first single album, Beam, talking about Seventeen's upcoming 10 years anniversary and teasing the show. The YouTube live gathered 50,000 real-time viewers.
