= Busan Arts College =

Coordinates: 35.142°N 129.085°E

- 부산예술대학교
- Established: 1993; 33 years ago
- Dean: Kim Gi-deok
- Administrative staff: 6
- Students: 790
- Location: Busan, South Korea
- Website: http://www.pia.ac.kr/ (in Korean)

- Busan Arts College
- Hangul: 부산예술대학교
- Hanja: 釜山藝術大學校
- RR: Busan yesul daehakgyo
- MR: Pusan yesul taehakkyo

Busan Arts College (Korean: 부산예술대학교) provides training in a range of fine and applied arts. The campus is located in the Nam-gu district of Busan metropolitan city, in southeastern South Korea. Under government regulations, the school has a maximum enrollment of 790, of whom 700 may be enrolled in the day program and 90 in weekend classes.

As of the reorganization of 2003, the college includes fifteen academic departments: applied music, music, theatre, practical dance, film and video, beauty art, modelling, sports and leisure studies, interior design, advertisement design, cartoon and animation, fine art, event producing, performing arts management, and creative writing.

== History ==
The college received permission to open as a college with a maximum enrollment of 480 in 1993, and accepted its first students in spring 1994. The Wongok Educational Foundation, which established it, had been in operation since 1978. The school's art gallery opened in 1999. The current dean, Kim Gi-deok, was installed in 2003.

In 2026, the government restricted financial aid to students at the college, effective in 2027.

== Notable people ==
- Kim Kwang-kyu, actor
- Park Jimin, member of BTS
- Jung Hyun-Jeon, former member of Baby Vox

== See also ==
- List of colleges and universities in South Korea
- Education in South Korea
