= Three Meals a Day =

South Korean television series

- Also known as: Three Meals
- Hangul: 삼시세끼
- RR: Samsisekki
- MR: Samsisekki
- Genre: Variety show; Cooking show; Reality show
- Written by: Lee Woo-jung; Kim Dae-joo
- Directed by: Na Young-seok; Yang Seul-gi
- Starring: Lee Seo-jin; Ok Taec-yeon; Cha Seung-won; Yoo Hae-jin; Son Ho-jun; Eric Mun; Yoon Kyun-sang and others
- Country of origin: South Korea
- Original language: Korean
- No. of seasons: 9
- No. of episodes: 106

Production
- Production location: South Korea
- Running time: 70 – 90 minutes

Original release
- Network: tvN
- Release: October 17, 2014 – July 10, 2020

Three Meals a Day (Korean: 삼시세끼; RR: Samsisekki) is a South Korean reality cooking show broadcast on tvN. The cast live in a small rural or fishing village for three days a week and are tasked to use whatever food they find there to cook three meals a day. They also experience village life while interacting with the locals and entertain various celebrity guests for dinner.

Nine seasons aired from October 2014 to July 2020 on Friday nights at various time slots. Each season featured different locations and casts, according to various themes. There are four themes in total: Jeongseon Village and Fishing Village, which recur across multiple seasons; Gochang Village; and an all-female cast edition Mountain Village.

Two web spin-offs featuring various cast members of New Journey to the West were also produced and released on producer Na Young-seok's YouTube channel. Three Meals in Iceland was released from September 20 to November 29, 2019, while Three Meals a Day for Four, featuring Sechs Kies, was released from May 15 to July 24, 2020.

In October 2021, a third spin-off was released for television broadcast, featuring the cast of hit drama series Hospital Playlist.

== Production ==
The idea for Three Meals a Day came about from a joke on Grandpas Over Flowers, which producer-director Na Young-seok and actor Lee Seo-jin had worked together on previously. Due to his poor cooking skills while filming Grandpas Over Flowers, the production crew jokingly nicknamed Lee the "Cooking King." This became a running gag about Lee starring in a fake cooking show titled Cooking King Seo-jinnie, a parody of the popular drama series Bread, Love and Dreams, which eventually materialised into Three Meals a Day.

Lee was cast for the first season of the series, also the first of the Jeongseon Village editions, alongside former Wonderful Days co-star Ok Taecyeon. In the second Jeongseon Village edition, former guest Kim Kwang-kyu joined the two as a regular cast member. On top of the regular cooking premise, the trio were given the additional task of growing and harvesting crops from spring to early fall, with grocery shopping strictly prohibited.

The first four seasons of Three Meals a Day in 2014 and 2015 alternated between the Jeongseon Village and Fishing Village editions, showcasing different seasons in different locations. Cha Seung-won, Yoo Hae-jin and Son Ho-jun formed a separate cast for the first two Fishing Village editions. In 2016, this cast filmed in a new location for the standalone Gochang Village edition, alongside new member Nam Joo-hyuk.

Later in October 2016, it was announced that Lee Seo-jin would return for a new season, a year after his last appearance in Jeongseon Village 2. New cast members Eric Mun and Yoon Kyun-sang joined him for Fishing Village 3, filmed on a new island location. The same cast returned in 2017 to the same location, but were tasked with island farming instead of fishing, hence the Seaside Ranch subtitle for the fourth Fishing Village edition.

On July 1, 2019, it was confirmed that actresses Yum Jung-ah, Yoon Se-ah and Park So-dam had joined the first all-female cast for the Mountain Village edition, which began airing in August.

In 2020, the original Fishing Village cast returned for the theme's fifth edition. Unlike previous editions, this season was filmed on an uninhabited island due to the ongoing COVID-19 pandemic and the need for social distancing.

== Overview ==
| Season | Title | | Location | Broadcast date | No. of episodes | Time slot (KST) | Ref. |
|---|---|---|---|---|---|---|---|
| 1 | Three Meals a Day: Jeongseon Village | JS | Jeongseon County, Gangwon Province | October 17 – December 26, 2014 | 11 | 21:50 – 23:10 | |
| 2 | Three Meals a Day: Fishing Village | F | Manjae Island (Sinan-gun, South Jeolla Province) | January 23 – March 20, 2015 | 9 | 21:45 – 23:10 | |
| 3 | Three Meals a Day: Jeongseon Village 2 | JS | Jeongseon County, Gangwon Province | May 15 – September 11, 2015 | 18 | 21:45 – 23:25 | |
| 4 | Three Meals a Day: Fishing Village 2 | F | Manjae Island (Sinan-gun, South Jeolla Province) | October 9 – December 11, 2015 | 10 | 21:45 – 23:25 | |
| 5 | Three Meals a Day: Gochang Village | | Gochang County, North Jeolla Province | July 1 – September 16, 2016 | 12 | 21:45 – 23:25 | |
| 6 | Three Meals a Day: Fishing Village 3 | F | Deukryang Island (Goheung County, South Jeolla Province) | October 14 – December 30, 2016 | 12 | 21:15 – 23:00 | |
| 7 | Three Meals a Day: Seaside Ranch (Fishing Village 4) | F | Deukryang Island (Goheung County, South Jeolla Province) | August 4 – October 20, 2017 | 12 | 21:50 – 23:25 | |
| 8 | Three Meals a Day: Mountain Village | M | Jeongseon County, Gangwon Province | August 9 – October 18, 2019 | 11 | 21:10 – 23:00 | |
| 9 | Three Meals a Day: Fishing Village 5 | F | Jukgul Island (Wando County, South Jeolla Province) | May 1 – July 10, 2020 | 11 | 21:10 – 23:00 | |
| Spin-off 2 | Three Meals for Four | M | Jeongseon County, Gangwon Province | May 15 – July 24, 2020 | 10 | Fridays, 23:00 – 23:15 | |
| Spin-off 3 | Three Meals a Day: Doctors | M | Jeongseon County, Gangwon Province | October 8, 2021 to December 3, 2021 | 8 | Fridays, 20:50 – 22:25 | |

== Cast ==
| Name | Season(s) | | | | | | | | | | | Ref. |
|---|---|---|---|---|---|---|---|---|---|---|---|---|
| Name | Jeongseon Village | | Fishing Village | | | | | Gochang Village | Mountain Village | | | Ref. |
| Lee Seo-jin | 1 | 2 | | | 3 | 4 | | | | | | |
| Ok Taec-yeon | 1 | 2 | | | | | | | | | | |
| Cha Seung-won | | | 1 | 2 | | | 5 | ✓ | | | | |
| Yoo Hae-jin | | | 1 | 2 | | | 5 | ✓ | | | | |
| Son Ho-jun | | | 1 (Note: Son Ho-jun initially appeared as a guest for episodes 2 and 3, but stayed on as a main cast for the rest of the season. He replaced Jang Keun-suk, who was edited out from the first 4 episodes and eventually left the show following tax evasion allegations.) | 2 | | | 5 | ✓ | | | | |
| Kim Kwang-kyu | | 2 | | | | | | | | | | |
| Nam Joo-hyuk | | | | | | | | ✓ | | | | |
| Eric Mun | | | | | 3 | 4 | | | | | | |
| Yoon Kyun-sang | | | | | 3 | 4 | | | | | | |
| Yum Jung-ah | | | | | | | | | ✓ | | | |
| Yoon Se-ah | | | | | | | | | ✓ | | | |
| Park So-dam | | | | | | | | | ✓ | | | |
| Eun Ji-won | | | | | | | | | | ✓ | | |
| Jang Su-won | | | | | | | | | | ✓ | | |
| Kim Jae-duck | | | | | | | | | | ✓ | | |
| Lee Jae-jin | | | | | | | | | | ✓ | | |
| Jeon Mi-do | | | | | | | | | | | ✓ | |
| Jo Jung-suk | | | | | | | | | | | ✓ | |
| Jung Kyung-ho | | | | | | | | | | | ✓ | |
| Kim Dae-myung | | | | | | | | | | | ✓ | |
| Yoo Yeon-seok | | | | | | | | | | | ✓ | |

== List of episodes, guests and ratings ==
In the tables below, the blue numbers represent the lowest ratings of the season and the red numbers represent the highest ratings of the season.

=== Jeongseon Village ===
==== Jeongseon Village 1 ====
List of episodes, guests and ratings

In the first episode, the production crew introduces the below rules for the cast's village experience:

- All ingredients used, except rice, must come from their farm
- Every meal has to follow a pre-determined menu
- Preparation for winter should be undertaken during their free time
- Cell phones will be taken away to aid integration into farming life

| Ep. # | Broadcast Date | Guest(s) | AGB Ratings | | Notes |
| Ep. # | Broadcast Date | Guest(s) | Nationwide | Seoul Capital Area | Notes |
|---|---|---|---|---|---|
| 1 | October 17, 2014 | Youn Yuh-jung, Choi Hwa-jung | 4.287% | 3.979% | |
| 2 | October 24, 2014 | Shin Goo, Baek Il-seob | 5.729% | 6.484% | |
| 3 | October 31, 2014 | Kim Kwang-kyu | 6.697% | 7.765% | |
| 4 | November 7, 2014 | Kim Kwang-kyu | 6.963% | 8.099% | |
| 4 | November 7, 2014 | Kim Ji-ho | 6.963% | 8.099% | |
| 5 | November 14, 2014 | Ryu Seung-soo | 6.984% | 8.859% | |
| 6 | November 21, 2014 | Go Ara | 7.231% | 9.169% | |
| 7 | November 28, 2014 | Son Ho-jun, Choi Ji-woo | 7.799% | 8.990% | (Note: Taec-yeon was unable to join the shoot due to 2PM's world tour and only makes a brief appearance in this episode.) |
| 8 | December 5, 2014 | Son Ho-jun, Choi Ji-woo | 8.177% | 9.277% | (Note: Taec-yeon was absent in this episode due to 2PM's world tour.) |
| 8 | December 5, 2014 | Lee Soon-jae, Kim Yeong-cheol | 8.177% | 9.277% | (Note: Taec-yeon was absent in this episode due to 2PM's world tour.) |
| 9 | December 12, 2014 | Lee Seung-gi, Kim Kwang-kyu | 8.746% | 9.368% | |
| 10 | December 19, 2014 | Lee Seung-gi, Kim Kwang-kyu | 8.946% | 11.043% | |
| 10 | December 19, 2014 | Lee Seung-gi, Kim Kwang-kyu, Youn Yuh-jung, Choi Hwa-jung | 8.946% | 11.043% | |
| 11 | December 26, 2014 | — | 5.748% | 6.274% | (Note: Director's cut epilogue) |
| Average | | | 7.028% | 8.119% | |

==== Jeongseon Village 2 ====
List of episodes, guests and ratings

| Ep. # | Broadcast Date | Guest(s) | AGB Ratings | |
| Ep. # | Broadcast Date | Guest(s) | Nationwide | Seoul Capital Area |
|---|---|---|---|---|
| 1 | May 15, 2015 | — | 7.886% | 8.775% |
| 2 | May 22, 2015 | Park Shin-hye | 7.477% | 8.006% |
| 3 | May 29, 2015 | Park Shin-hye | 8.240% | 8.783% |
| 4 | June 5, 2015 | Ji Sung | 8.857% | 9.958% |
| 5 | June 12, 2015 | Ji Sung | 8.685% | 10.079% |
| 6 | June 19, 2015 | BoA, Yoo Hae-jin | 8.432% | 9.872% |
| 7 | June 26, 2015 | BoA, Yoo Hae-jin | 10.500% | 11.419% |
| 8 | July 3, 2015 | Kim Ha-neul | 11.990% | 13.805% |
| 9 | July 10, 2015 | Kim Ha-neul | 11.197% | 12.258% |
| 10 | July 17, 2015 | Choi Ji-woo | 12.148% | 15.095% |
| 11 | July 24, 2015 | Choi Ji-woo | 10.918% | 11.878% |
| 12 | July 31, 2015 | Son Ho-jun | 10.310% | 9.742% |
| 13 | August 7, 2015 | Hong Seok-cheon | 10.654% | 11.564% |
| 14 | August 14, 2015 | Lee Sun-kyun | 10.188% | 11.053% |
| 15 | August 21, 2015 | Lee Sun-kyun | 11.165% | 12.180% |
| 16 | August 28, 2015 | Park Shin-hye | 11.112% | 12.091% |
| 17 | September 4, 2015 | Park Shin-hye | 10.766% | 11.933% |
| 18 | September 11, 2015 | — | 7.351% | 7.468% |
| Average | | | 9.882% | 10.887% |

=== Fishing Village ===
==== Fishing Village 1 ====
List of episodes, guests and ratings

| Ep. # | Broadcast Date | Guest | AGB Ratings | | Notes |
| Ep. # | Broadcast Date | Guest | Nationwide | Seoul Capital Area | Notes |
|---|---|---|---|---|---|
| 1 | January 23, 2015 | — | 9.676% | 10.052% | |
| 2 | January 30, 2015 | Son Ho-jun | 10.413% | 12.118% | |
| 3 | February 6, 2015 | Son Ho-jun | 10.549% | 10.590% | (Note: Son Ho-jun featured as a guest until episode 3, joining the regular cast from episode 4.) |
| 4 | February 13, 2015 | — | 12.381% | 13.941% | |
| 5 | February 20, 2015 | Jung Woo | 13.338% | 13.018% | |
| 6 | February 27, 2015 | Jung Woo | 12.810% | 13.658% | |
| 7 | March 6, 2015 | Choo Sung-hoon | 13.042% | 15.086% | |
| 8 | March 13, 2015 | Choo Sung-hoon | 12.838% | 13.703% | |
| 9 | March 20, 2015 | — | 8.645% | 8.811% | |
| Average | | | 11.521% | 12.331% | |

==== Fishing Village 2 ====
List of episodes, guests and ratings

Promotional poster for Three Meals a Day: Mountain Village

| Ep. # | Broadcast Date | Guest | AGB Ratings | |
| Ep. # | Broadcast Date | Guest | Nationwide | Seoul Capital Area |
|---|---|---|---|---|
| 1 | October 9, 2015 | Park Hyung-sik | 12.815% | 14.258% |
| 2 | October 16, 2015 | Park Hyung-sik | 12.890% | 14.103% |
| 3 | October 23, 2015 | Park Hyung-sik | 11.862% | 13.558% |
| 4 | October 30, 2015 | Lee Jin-wook | 13.284% | 14.719% |
| 5 | November 6, 2015 | Lee Jin-wook | 11.671% | 11.231% |
| 6 | November 13, 2015 | Lee Jin-wook | 11.503% | 13.226% |
| 7 | November 20, 2015 | — | 12.336% | 13.015% |
| 8 | November 27, 2015 | Yoon Kye-sang | 11.600% | 12.700% |
| 9 | December 4, 2015 | Yoon Kye-sang | 11.732% | 12.345% |
| 10 | December 11, 2015 | — | 9.677% | 10.522% |
| Average | | | 11.937% | 12.968% |

==== Fishing Village 3 ====
List of episodes, guests and ratings

Promotional poster for Three Meals a Day: Mountain Village

| Ep. # | Broadcast Date | AGB Ratings | | TNmS Ratings |
| Ep. # | Broadcast Date | Nationwide | Seoul Capital Area | Nationwide |
|---|---|---|---|---|
| 1 | October 14, 2016 | 11.536% | 11.788% | 13.0% |
| 2 | October 21, 2016 | 9.661% | 10.038% | 11.0% |
| 3 | October 28, 2016 | 10.587% | 10.306% | 11.6% |
| 4 | November 4, 2016 | 10.057% | 9.769% | 11.1% |
| 5 | November 11, 2016 | 9.934% | 9.843% | 10.6% |
| 6 | November 18, 2016 | 10.036% | 10.529% | 11.4% |
| 7 | November 25, 2016 | 9.685% | 10.369% | 10.6% |
| 8 | December 2, 2016 | 10.646% | 11.464% | 11.4% |
| 9 | December 9, 2016 | 10.169% | 11.736% | 11.1% |
| 10 | December 16, 2016 | 11.395% | 11.588% | 12.4% |
| 11 | December 23, 2016 | 10.866% | 12.527% | 10.6% |
| 12 | December 30, 2016 | 7.524% | 7.964% | 7.5% |
| Average | | 10.175% | 10.660% | 11.0% |

==== Seaside Ranch (Fishing Village 4) ====
List of episodes, guests and ratings

| Ep. # | Broadcast Date | Guest | AGB Ratings | | TNmS Ratings | Ref. |
| Ep. # | Broadcast Date | Guest | Nationwide | Seoul Capital Area | Nationwide | Ref. |
|---|---|---|---|---|---|---|
| 1 | August 4, 2017 | Han Ji-min | 10.568% | 11.403% | 10.9% | |
| 2 | August 11, 2017 | Han Ji-min | 9.233% | 9.812% | 9.8% | |
| 3 | August 18, 2017 | Han Ji-min | 9.817% | 11.431% | 10.0% | |
| 4 | August 25, 2017 | Lee Je-hoon | 8.740% | 9.595% | 9.1% | |
| 5 | September 1, 2017 | Lee Je-hoon | 8.330% | 9.003% | 8.2% | |
| 6 | September 8, 2017 | Seolhyun (AOA) | 9.116% | 9.388% | 10.0% | |
| 7 | September 15, 2017 | Seolhyun (AOA) | 8.764% | 9.681% | 8.6% | |
| 8 | September 22, 2017 | Lee Jong-suk | 9.810% | 11.471% | 9.5% | |
| 9 | September 29, 2017 | Lee Jong-suk | 8.580% | 9.250% | 8.9% | |
| 10 | October 6, 2017 | Shinhwa (Lee Min-woo, Andy Lee) | 9.049% | 9.641% | 7.9% | |
| 11 | October 13, 2017 | Shinhwa (Lee Min-woo, Andy Lee) | 9.085% | 10.162% | 9.0% | |
| 12 | October 20, 2017 | — | 6.046% | 7.212% | 6.2% | |
| Average | | | 8.928% | 9.837% | 9.0% | |

==== Fishing Village 5 ====
List of episodes, guests and ratings

| Ep. # | Broadcast Date | Guest | AGB Ratings | | Ref. |
| Ep. # | Broadcast Date | Guest | Nationwide | Seoul Capital Area | Ref. |
|---|---|---|---|---|---|
| 1 | May 1, 2020 | — | 9.276% | 8.861% | |
| 2 | May 8, 2020 | Gong Hyo-jin | 9.842% | 10.818% | |
| 3 | May 15, 2020 | Gong Hyo-jin | 12.188% | 12.814% | |
| 4 | May 22, 2020 | Gong Hyo-jin | 11.378% | 12.580% | |
| 5 | May 29, 2020 | Lee Kwang-soo | 11.472% | 12.503% | |
| 6 | June 5, 2020 | Lee Kwang-soo | 10.869% | 12.228% | |
| 7 | June 12, 2020 | Lee Kwang-soo | 11.194% | 12.931% | |
| 8 | June 19, 2020 | — | 10.981% | 11.645% | |
| 9 | June 26, 2020 | Lee Seo-jin | 12.199% | 13.945% | |
| 10 | July 3, 2020 | Lee Seo-jin | 11.686% | 12.613% | |
| 11 | July 10, 2020 | — | 8.594% | 9.427% | |
| Average | | | 10.880% | 11.851% | |

=== Gochang Village ===
List of episodes, guests and ratings

Promotional poster for Three Meals a Day: Gochang Village

After two Fishing Village editions, Cha Seung-won, Yoo Hae-jin and Son Ho-jun are reunited in their first inland location in Gochang County, joined by Nam Joo-hyuk. In order to buy groceries, they have to provide farm labour for which they are paid hourly wages. Through the series, they experience various farming activities: planting rice, rearing ducks, and picking black raspberries, watermelons, sweet potatoes, grapes, muskmelons and pears.

| Ep. # | Broadcast Date | AGB Ratings | | TNmS Ratings |
| Ep. # | Broadcast Date | Nationwide | Seoul Capital Area | Nationwide |
|---|---|---|---|---|
| 1 | July 1, 2016 | 10.785% | 10.957% | 10.7% |
| 2 | July 8, 2016 | 10.181% | 10.572% | 8.8% |
| 3 | July 15, 2016 | 11.587% | 12.483% | 9.4% |
| 4 | July 22, 2016 | 10.564% | 11.591% | 10.3% |
| 5 | July 29, 2016 | 11.056% | 12.075% | 10.3% |
| 6 | August 5, 2016 | 10.194% | 10.127% | 12.0% |
| 7 | August 12, 2016 | 9.164% | 9.833% | 10.4% |
| 8 | August 19, 2016 | 8.971% | 9.376% | 11.9% |
| 9 | August 26, 2016 | 10.840% | 11.630% | 12.2% |
| 10 | September 2, 2016 | 9.478% | 9.306% | 11.3% |
| 11 | September 9, 2016 | 9.328% | 9.483% | 10.6% |
| 12 | September 16, 2016 | 5.178% | 5.244% | 5.7% |
| Average | | 9.777% | 10.223% | 10.3% |

=== Mountain Village ===
List of episodes, guests and ratings

Promotional poster for Three Meals a Day: Mountain Village

| Episode # | Broadcast Date | Guest | AGB Ratings | | Ref. |
| Episode # | Broadcast Date | Guest | Nationwide | Seoul Capital Area | Ref. |
|---|---|---|---|---|---|
| 1 | August 9, 2019 | Jung Woo-sung | 7.231% | 7.507% | |
| 2 | August 16, 2019 | Jung Woo-sung | 7.764% | 7.529% | |
| 3 | August 23, 2019 | Jung Woo-sung | 7.243% | 7.200% | |
| 4 | August 30, 2019 | Oh Na-ra | 7.122% | 7.236% | |
| 5 | September 6, 2019 | Oh Na-ra | 6.635% | 6.338% | |
| 6 | September 13, 2019 | Nam Joo-hyuk | 5.614% | 5.683% | |
| 7 | September 20, 2019 | Nam Joo-hyuk | 6.671% | 6.913% | |
| 8 | September 27, 2019 | Nam Joo-hyuk | 6.184% | 5.652% | |
| 9 | October 4, 2019 | Park Seo-joon | 6.886% | 7.141% | |
| 10 | October 11, 2019 | Park Seo-joon | 6.895% | 6.812% | |
| 11 | October 18, 2019 | Park Seo-joon | 5.280% | 5.001% | |
| Average | | | 6.684% | 6.637% | |

== Spin-offs ==
The first two spin-offs of Three Meals a Day were "hybrid" programs produced for both online release and television broadcast. Short highlight videos between 5 and 15 minutes were broadcast on tvN, with the full episodes released on "Channel 15ya" (채널 십오야; Chaeneol siboya), a YouTube channel run by producer Na Young-seok and his team. Both spin-offs were born from New Journey to the West, another series produced by producer Na, and feature some of its cast.

In October 2021, a third spin-off was released for television broadcast featuring the main cast of drama series Hospital Playlist: Jo Jung-suk, Yoo Yeon-seok, Jung Kyung-ho, Kim Dae-myung and Jeon Mi-do. The series is titled Wise Mountain Village Life (Korean: 슬기로운 산촌생활), borrowing on the drama's title, but is commonly known in English as Three Meals a Day: Doctors.

| Title | Cast | Location | Web release date | Television time slot (KST) | No. of episodes |
|---|---|---|---|---|---|
| Three Meals a Day in Iceland (Korean: 삼시세끼: 아이슬란드 간 세끼) | Lee Soo-geun, Eun Ji-won | Iceland | September 20 – November 29, 2019 | Fridays, 22:40 – 22:45 | 12 |
| Three Meals a Day for Four (Korean: 삼시네세끼) | Eun Ji-won, Lee Jai-jin, Kim Jae-duck, Jang Su-won (Members of Sechs Kies) | Jeongseon County, Gangwon Province | May 15 – July 24, 2020 | Fridays, 23:00 – 23:15 | 11 |
| Three Meals a Day: Doctors (Korean: 슬기로운 산촌생활) | Jo Jung-suk, Yoo Yeon-seok, Jung Kyung-ho, Kim Dae-myung and Jeon Mi-do | Jeongseon County, Gangwon Province | October 8, 2021 to December 3, 2021 | Fridays, 20:50 – 22:25 | 9 |

Three Meals a Day: Doctors — List of episodes, guests and ratings
Three Meals a Day - Doctors : South Korea viewers per episode (millions)

| Season | Episode number | | | | | | | | | Average |
| Season | 1 | 2 | 3 | 4 | 5 | 6 | 7 | 8 | 9 | Average |
|---|---|---|---|---|---|---|---|---|---|---|
| Doctors | 1.814 | 1.535 | 1.621 | 1.572 | 1.358 | 1.598 | 1.410 | 1.144 | 1.055 | 1.456 |

Source: Audience measurement performed nationwide by Nielsen Media Research.

| Ep. # | Broadcast Date | Guest | AGB Ratings | |
| Ep. # | Broadcast Date | Guest | Nationwide | Seoul Capital Area |
|---|---|---|---|---|
| 1 | October 8, 2021 | — | 6.700% | 7.789% |
| 2 | October 15, 2021 | Shin Hyun-been | 5.542% | 6.369% |
| 3 | October 22, 2021 | Shin Hyun-been, Kim Hae-sook | 5.901% | 6.678% |
| 4 | October 29, 2021 | Shin Hyun-been, Kim Hae-sook | 5.474% | 6.637% |
| 5 | November 5, 2021 | Shin Won-ho | 5.482% | 6.316% |
| 6 | November 12, 2021 | Bae Hyun-sung, Cho Yi-hyun | 6.225% | 6.881% |
| 7 | November 19, 2021 | Bae Hyun-sung, Cho Yi-hyun | 5.401% | 5.781% |
| 7 | November 19, 2021 | Jung Moon-sung | 5.401% | 5.781% |
| 8 | November 26, 2021 | Jung Moon-sung, Ahn Eun-jin | 4.226% | 4.603% |
| 9 | December 3, 2021 | — | 4.033% | 4.798% |
| Average | | | 5.443% | 6.206% |

In the table above, the blue number represents the lowest ratings and the red number represents the highest ratings.

== Reception ==
Three Meals a Day drew a great response from Korean viewers and became a trending topic numerous times on Naver, a Korean search portal. It received viewership ratings of 6%, which is high for Korean cable television for which a 1% rating is considered a success.

Originally 8 episodes were planned for the first season, but the show was extended by two episodes. A "director's cut" epilogue also aired, for a total of 11 episodes.

The table below charts viewership numbers according to Nielsen Korea; data for 2017 and earlier is not provided. Individual episode ratings can be viewed by season in the episode lists above.

Three Meals a Day : South Korea viewers per episode (millions)

| Season | Episode number | | | | | | | | | | | Average |
| Season | 1 | 2 | 3 | 4 | 5 | 6 | 7 | 8 | 9 | 10 | 11 | Average |
|---|---|---|---|---|---|---|---|---|---|---|---|---|
| Mountain Village | 1.837 | 1.991 | 1.844 | 1.725 | 1.822 | 1.420 | 1.722 | 1.448 | 1.695 | 1.707 | 1.274 | 1.680 |
| Fishing Village 5 | 2.492 | 2.625 | 3.179 | 3.026 | 2.828 | 2.751 | 2.806 | 2.949 | 3.084 | 2.987 | 2.104 | 2.803 |

Source: Audience measurement performed nationwide by Nielsen Media Research.

== Awards and nominations ==
| Year | Award | Category | Recipient | Result | Ref. |
|---|---|---|---|---|---|
| 2015 | 9th Cable TV Broadcasting Awards | Best Production in Creative Content | Na Young-seok | Won | |
| 2015 | 51st Baeksang Arts Awards | Grand Prize (Television) | Na Young-seok | Won | |
| 2015 | 51st Baeksang Arts Awards | Best Entertainment Program | Three Meals a Day | Nominated | |
| 2016 | tvN10 Awards | Grand Prize (Daesang), Variety | Three Meals a Day: Fishing Village 1, 2 | Won | |
| 2016 | tvN10 Awards | Grand Prize (Daesang), Variety Performer | Lee Seo-jin (Three Meals a Day: Jeongseon Village) | Won | |
| 2016 | tvN10 Awards | Best Content Award, Variety | Three Meals a Day | Won | |
| 2016 | tvN10 Awards | Variety Icon | Cha Seung-won and Yoo Hae-jin (Three Meals a Day: Fishing Village 1, 2) | Nominated | |
| 2016 | tvN10 Awards | Variety Icon | Lee Seo-jin (Three Meals a Day: Jeongseon Village) | Nominated | |
| 2016 | tvN10 Awards | Made in tvN, Actor in Variety | Son Ho-jun (Three Meals a Day: Fishing Village 1, 2) | Won | |
| 2016 | tvN10 Awards | Variety "Slave" Award | Kim Kwang-kyu (Three Meals a Day: Jeongseon Village 2) | Nominated | |
