= Summer Vacation (2020 TV series) =

South Korean reality show

- Promotional poster
- 여름방학
- Genre: Reality television
- Directed by: Na Young-seok & Lee Jin-Ju
- Country of origin: South Korea
- Original language: Korean
- No. of seasons: 1
- No. of episodes: 11

Production
- Running time: 90 minutes

Original release
- Network: tvN
- Release: July 17 – September 25, 2020

Summer Vacation (Korean: 여름방학) is a South Korean "home vacation" reality show that aired on tvN every Friday at 21:50 (KST) starting from July 17, 2020.

== Overview ==
It is a reality show featuring Korean celebrities, Jung Yu-mi and Choi Woo-shik. They take a vacation in an unfamiliar location so as to recover from the stresses and strains of modern urban life. These celebrities also invite their other celebrity friends to stay at their countryside vacation home.

== Episodes ==
Ep.	Broadcast Date	Location	Guest(s)	Ratings (AGB Nielsen Korea) Nationwide
1	July 17	Goseong-gun, Gangwon-do	Park Seo-joon	4.989%
2	July 24	Goseong-gun, Gangwon-do	Park Seo-joon	4.163%
3	July 31	Goseong-gun, Gangwon-do	Park Seo-joon	3.118%
4	August 7	Goseong-gun, Gangwon-do	-	2.508%
5	August 14	Goseong-gun, Gangwon-do	Lee Sun-kyun & Park Hee-soon	2.905%
6	August 21	Goseong-gun, Gangwon-do	Lee Sun-kyun & Park Hee-soon	3.069%
7	August 28	Goseong-gun, Gangwon-do	Lee Sun-kyun & Park Hee-soon	2.799%
8	September 4	Goseong-gun, Gangwon-do	Ahn So-hee & Choi Yong-bin	2.501%
9	September 11	Goseong-gun, Gangwon-do	Ahn So-hee & Choi Yong-bin	2.208%
10	September 18	Goseong-gun, Gangwon-do	Ahn So-hee & Choi Yong-bin	2.104%
11	September 25	Goseong-gun, Gangwon-do	(Director's cut)	1.337%
