= Lee Eun-ji (entertainer) =

South Korean entertainer (born 1992)

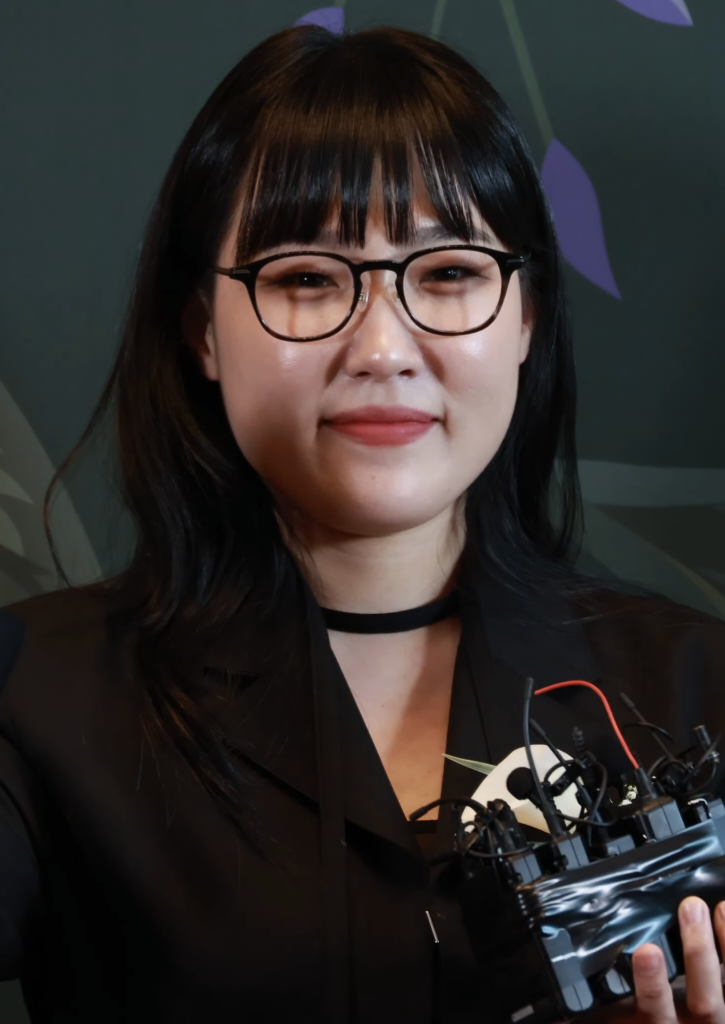
- Lee in May 2024
- Born: January 16, 1992 (age 34); Incheon, South Korea
- Occupation: Entertainer
- Years active: 2014–present
- Agent: Black Paper

Korean name
- Hangul: 이은지
- RR: I Eunji
- MR: I Ŭnji

Lee Eun-ji (Korean: 이은지; born January 16, 1992) is a South Korean entertainer. She won the Best Female Variety Performer at the 59th Baeksang Arts Awards for Earth Arcade.

== Career ==
In 2014, Lee debuted in tvN's comedy skit show Comedy Big League, a career shift after being a dance sports athlete during her teen years.

In March 2021, she had signed an exclusive contract with Cube Entertainment. In February 2026, Lee had signed an exclusive contract with Black Paper.

== Public image ==
In 2023, Lee was considered one of South Korea's most sought-after entertainers on television, YouTube, and other online streaming platforms.

== Other ventures ==
=== Ambassadorship ===
In November 2023, Lee had been appointed as ambassador of Incheon to increase the value of the city, promote municipal administration, and instill pride in citizens.

In July 2024, Lee had been appointed as goodwill ambassador of Incheon International Airport Customs to promote and create a culture of sincere reporting of traveler's belongings.

In March 2025, Lee had been appointed as goodwill ambassador of Z-Foundation's "Run for the Moon" campaign, in commemoration of World Menstruation Day, which aims to raise funds to create a healthy menstrual environment for women.

=== Endorsements ===
In June 2024, Lee became an advertising model for "Max Spicy Shanghai Burger" of the fast food chain McDonald's.

In August 2025, Lee was selected as a model for Derma Clean Beauty's The Lab by Blanc Dou, presenting the "Moisture Pul-rotating (Flirting)" campaign.

== Filmography ==
=== Television shows ===
Year	Title	Role	Notes	Ref.
2014	Comedy Big League	Cast member	Season 5	
2021	Hesitation Before Going to School	Host	My Teenage Girl prequel	
2021	Awesome Romance	Host		
2022	War of the Roses	Host		
2022	Our Cha Cha Cha	Host		
2022	SNL Korea Reboot	Host	Season 12	
2022	Mr. Trot	Judge	Season 2	
2022–2025	Earth Arcade	Cast member	Season 1–3	
2023	The Wedding War	Host		
2023	Alumni Lovers	Host		
2023	Miss Trot	Judge	Season 3	
2024	Subscription King	Host		
2024	Watcha Up to?	Cast member		
2024	JangAhn Sellabration Pilot	Cast member		
2024	Earth Arcade's Vroom Vroom	Cast member	Earth Arcade spinoff	
2024	Real Dating Lab: Poisoned Apple	Cast member		
2024	Country Life of Gen-Z	Cast member		
2024	Extreme Tour	Cast member		
2025	Please Take Care of My Refrigerator	Special host	Season 2	
2025	I'm Sunny Thank You	Cast member		
2025	Idol Star Athletics Championships	Host	3 days; October 6–8, 2025	
2026	The Last Humanity	Cast member		

=== Web shows ===
Year	Title	Role	Ref.
2021	Panda Ideas	Host	
2022–2023	Love Alarm Clap! Clap! Clap!	Host	
2023	Comedy Royale	Cast member	
2024	Agents of Mystery	Cast member	
2025–present	Better Late than Single	Host/Cupid	

=== Radio shows ===
Year	Title	Role	Notes	Ref.
2023	Lee Eun-ji's Music Plaza	DJ	KBS Cool FM	

== Awards and nominations ==
Name of the award ceremony, year presented, category, nominee of the award, and the result of the nomination
Award ceremony	Year	Category	Nominee / Work	Result	Ref.
Baeksang Arts Awards	2023	Best Female Variety Performer	Lee Eun-ji; Earth Arcade	Won	
Brand Customer Loyalty Award (Note: Co-organized by the Korean Customers Council and Brand Keys, this event recognizes the most influential brands in society and culture, as determined through consumer research.)	2023	Female Comedian	Lee Eun-ji	Won	
Brand Customer Loyalty Award	2024	Female Comedian	Lee Eun-ji	Won	
Brand Customer Loyalty Award	2025	Female Comedian	Lee Eun-ji	Won	
Brand of the Year Awards (Note: It is a large-scale brand award that selects and awards the best brands that shined in the year through direct consumer voting.)	2021	Female Entertainer	Lee Eun-ji	Won	
Brand of the Year Awards	2022	Female Entertainer	Lee Eun-ji	Won	
Brand of the Year Awards	2023	Female Entertainer	Lee Eun-ji	Won	
Brand of the Year Awards	2023	Female Comedian	Lee Eun-ji	Won	
Brand of the Year Awards	2024	Female Entertainer	Lee Eun-ji	Won	
Brand of the Year Awards	2024	Female Radio DJ	Lee Eun-ji	Won	
KBS Entertainment Awards	2023	DJ Award	Lee Eun-ji's Music Plaza	Won	
Korea Arts and Culture Awards	2021	Female Comedian	Lee Eun-ji	Won	
Korea Culture Entertainment Awards	2016	Rookie of the Year Award	Comedy Big League	Won	
Korea Culture Entertainment Awards	2021	Entertainment Star Award	Lee Eun-ji	Won	
Korea First Brand Awards (Note: The Korea First Brand Awards is hosted by the Korea Consumer Brand Committee and the Korea Consumer Forum. Awards are based on a nationwide survey held in South Korea.)	2022	Female Variety Star	Lee Eun-ji	Won	
Korea First Brand Awards	2025	Female Entertainer	Lee Eun-ji	Won	
