= Son Ho-jun =

South Korean actor and singer (born 1984)

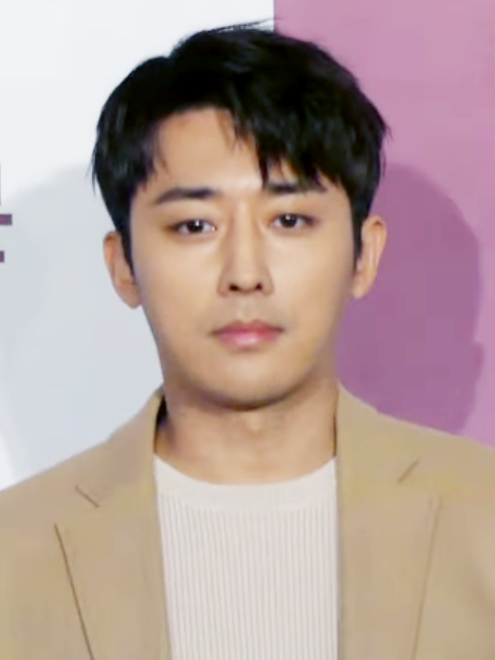
- Son in 2019
- Born: June 27, 1984 (age 42); Gwangsan District, Gwangju, South Korea
- Education: Songwon University – Department of Entertainment
- Occupation: Actor
- Years active: 2006–present
- Agent: 333

Korean name
- Hangul: 손호준
- RR: Son Hojun
- MR: Son Hojun

Son Ho-jun (Korean: 손호준; born June 27, 1984) is a South Korean actor and singer.

== Early years and career ==
Son made his acting debut in 2006 in the educational drama, Jump 2. In 2007, Son made his entertainment debut as the leader of Tachyon, a three-member boyband, which first performed on the show A-Live on Channel V Korea. The first pop group launched by J&H Media, Tachyon released the debut single Feel Your Breeze (a Korean remake from the Japanese boyband V6), then disbanded shortly after.

After appearing in the SBS drama Coffee House, which ended in July 2010, Son entered military service. Upon his return in 2013, he returned to acting and rose to stardom for playing the character Haitai in campus drama Reply 1994. He also gained popularity for appearing in reality shows, notably Youth Over Flowers and Three Meals a Day: Fishing Village.

In July 2016, Son signed with YG Entertainment. In 2017, he starred in the hit romance drama Confession Couple. In 2019, he gained critical acclaim for his acting in The Light in Your Eyes. In 2020, Son played the role of a successful novelist and scriptwriter in the Netflix drama, Was It Love?.

On June 30, 2021, Son signed with Think Entertainment. In June 2024, Son has decided not to renew his contract. In March 2025, Son established a new agency, 333.

== Philanthropy ==
On December 6, 2022, Son participated in Naver's "Happy Bean Special Fundraising" (Note: Happy Bean is online donation service established by Naver in 2005.) with branded "119REO" firefighting suits to help improve the treatment of firefighters.

== Filmography ==
=== Film ===
Year	Title	Role	Notes	Ref.
2008	Death Bell	Jo Beom		
2009	Wish	Kim Young-joo		
2010	Death Bell 2: Bloody Camp	Park Jung-beom		
2014	Big Match	Jae-yeol		
2015	Three Summer Nights	Wang Hae-goo		
2015	Circle of Atonement	Nam Chul-woong		
2017	Wedding	Joo-yeon		
2019	A Diamond in the Rough	Kim Gi-kang		
2021	A Wild Apricot	Young-shin	Self-produced short film	
2022	Stellar	Young-bae	In production, tentative release date.	

=== Television series ===
Year	Title	Role	Notes	Ref.
2006	Jump 2			
2008	The Shanghai Brothers			
2009	Cinderella Man	Yeo Jeong-min		
2010	Coffee House			
2013	Reply 1994	Haitai		
2014	Beyond the Clouds	Han Young-joon		
2014	Lovers of Music	Seol Tae-song		
2015	Warm and Cozy	Son Joon-hee	Cameo (Episode 16)	
2015	Mrs. Cop	Han Jin-woo		
2016	Blow Breeze	Lee Jang-go		
2017	KBS Drama Special: "Let Us Meet, Joo Oh"	Cha Joo-oh		
2017	Go Back	Choi Ban-do		
2018	My Secret Terrius	Jin Young-tae		
2019	The Light in Your Eyes	Kim Young-soo / Lee Min-soo		
2020	Was It Love?	Oh Dae-oh		
2021	The Uncanny Counter	Oh Jung-gu	Cameo (Episode 15)	
2022–2023	The First Responders	Bong Do-jin	Season 1–2	
2023	My Happy Ending	Heo Soon-young		

=== Web series ===
Year	Title	Role	Notes	Ref.
2022	Work Later, Drink Now	Sung-soo	Cameo (Season 2)	

=== Television shows ===
Year	Title	Role	Notes	Ref.
2014	Youth Over Flowers Season 2: Laos	Cast member		
2015	Three Meals a Day: Fishing Village	Cast member		
2015	Law of the Jungle in Palau	Cast member	Episode 146–153	
2015	Law of the Jungle in Indochina	Cast member	Episode 154–158	
2015	Mr. Baek: The Homemade Food Master	Cast member	Episode 1–11	
2015	Off To School	Cast member	Episode 46–50	
2015	Three Meals a Day: Fishing Village – Season 2	Cast member		
2016	Three Meals a Day: Gochang Village	Cast member		
2019	Coffee Friends	Cast member	with Yoo Yeon-seok, Choi Ji-woo and Yang Se-jong	
2020	Three Meals a Day: Fishing Village – Season 5	Cast member		
2022	Kilimanjaro	Cast member	with Uee, Yoon Eun-hye, and Hyojung	

=== Web show ===
Year	Title	Role	Ref.
2021	Love Catcher in Seoul	Host	

=== Music video appearances ===
Year	Song title	Artist	Ref.
2008	"That Person"	SeeYa	
2009	"My Ugly Love"	Voice One	
2009	"Apple is A"	T-ara	
2013	"Do You Know Me?"	T-ara	
2014	"More and More"	The SeeYa	
2014	"Pillow"	Davichi	
2015	"Growing"	K.Will	
	"Just For One Day"	JeA feat. Baro	
2017	"Compass"	Lee Juck	

== Theater ==
Theater play performance
Year	Title		Role	Theater	Date	Ref.
Year	English	Korean	Role	Theater	Date	Ref.
2013–2014	Joseph Amazing	요셉 어메이징	Joseph	Daehak-ro Musical Centre	December 31, 2013 to February 9, 2014	
2024	Angels in America	엔젤스인 아메리카	Prior Walter	LG Signature Hall at LG Arts Center, Seoul	August 6 to September 28	
2025	Killing Ceasar		Ceasar			

== Discography ==
=== Singles ===
Title	Year	Album
"Feel Your Breeze" (with Tachyon and V6 cover)	2007	Tears
"Only Feeling You" (with Jung Woo & Yoo Yeon-seok)	2013	Reply 1994 OST
"More and More" (with The SeeYa)	2014	Tears
"Winter Love" (with Rocoberry)	2014	Winter Love
"Christmas Time" (with Rocoberry)	2014	Winter Love

== Awards and nominations ==
Name of the award ceremony, year presented, category, nominee of the award, and the result of the nomination
Award ceremony	Year	Category	Nominee / Work	Result	Ref.
APAN Star Awards	2014	Best New Actor	Reply 1994	Won	
APAN Star Awards	2015	Popular Star Award, actor	Mrs. Cop	Won	
Asia Model Awards	2015	Popular Star Award	Son Ho-jun	Won	
Baeksang Arts Awards	2019	Best Supporting Actor – Television	The Light in Your Eyes	Nominated	
KBS Drama Awards	2014	Best New Actor	Trot Lovers, The Full Sun	Nominated	
KBS Drama Awards	2017	Excellence Award, Actor in a Miniseries	Confession Couple	Nominated	
KBS Drama Awards	2017	Netizen Award – Male	Confession Couple	Nominated	
KBS Drama Awards	2017	Best Crying Scene	Son Ho-jun with Jang Na-ra; Confession Couple	Won	
KBS Drama Awards	2017	Best Couple Awards	Son Ho-jun with Jang Na-ra; Confession Couple	Won	
KBS Drama Awards	2017	Best Actor in a One-Act/Special/Short Drama	Drama Special – Let Us Meet, Joo-Oh	Nominated	
Korea Drama Awards	2014	Best New Actor	Reply 1994	Nominated	
MBC Drama Awards	2016	Excellence Award, Actor in a Serial Drama	Blow Breeze	Won	
MBC Drama Awards	2018	Excellence Award, Actor in a Wednesday-Thursday Miniseries	My Secret Terrius	Nominated	
MBC Drama Awards	2018	Bromance Award	Son Ho-jun with So Ji-sub and Kang Ki-young; My Secret Terrius	Won	
Metro Best K-drama Awards	2020	People's Choice – Best Couple	Son Ho-jun with Song Ji-hyo; Was It Love?	Nominated	
Metro Best K-drama Awards	2020	People's Choice – Best Kiss	Son Ho-jun with Song Ji-hyo; Was It Love?	Nominated	
MTN Broadcast Advertising Festival	2018	CF Star Award	Son Ho-jun	Won	
SBS Drama Awards	2015	New Star Award	Mrs. Cop	Won	
SBS Drama Awards	2015	Special Award, Actor in a Miniseries	Mrs. Cop	Nominated	
SBS Drama Awards	2022	Excellence Award, Actor in a Miniseries Genre/Fantasy Drama	The First Responders	Nominated	
tvN10 Awards	2016	Made in tvN (Variety), Male	Three Meals a Day	Won	
