= Kim Kwang-kyu (actor) =

South Korean actor (born 1967)

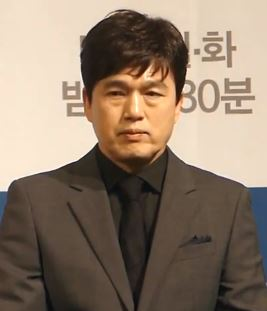
- Kim in 2019
- Born: December 8, 1967 (age 58); Yeongdo District, Busan, South Korea
- Education: Busan Arts College; Korea National Open University
- Occupation: Actor
- Years active: 1999–present
- Agent: Think Entertainment

Korean name
- Hangul: 김광규
- Hanja: 金光奎
- RR: Gim Gwanggyu
- MR: Kim Kwanggyu

Kim Kwang-kyu (Korean: 김광규; born December 8, 1967) is a South Korean actor. He made his acting debut in 1999 in Dr. K, and its director fellow Busan native Kwak Kyung-taek later cast him in a small but memorable role as a physically abusive teacher in the 2001 box-office hit Friend. Kim continued acting in both television and film as a supporting actor, notably in Couple or Trouble (2006), The Secret of Coocoo Island (2008), Scent of a Woman (2011), and I Can Hear Your Voice (2013). He also appears on the reality shows I Live Alone (since 2013) and Three Meals a Day (2015).

== Filmography ==
=== Film ===
Year	Title	Role	Notes/Ref.
1999	Dr. K	Physical therapist	
2000	Terror Taxi	Cab driver 2	
2001	Friend	Ill-mannered teacher	
2001	Take Care of My Cat	Train station ticket inspector	
2003	Mutt Boy	Team leader Seok	
2003	North Korean Guys	Detective squad chief	
2004	Windstruck	Undercover cop/Prince 3	
2004	My Brother	Homeroom teacher	
2005	You Are My Sunshine	Village leader	
2006	Oh! My God	Secretary Shin	
2006	Lump Sugar	Jang Man-ju	
2006	Tazza: The High Rollers	Lanky	
2007	Voice of a Murderer	Chief detective	
2007	Meet Mr. Daddy	Man in a suit	
2007	Underground Rendezvous	Regimental commander	Cameo
2007	The Worst Guy Ever	Man on blind date	Cameo
2007	Myodo Wild Flower	Pro-golfer	
2007	A Love	Union leader	Cameo
2008	My Mighty Princess	Machine operator, 5th brother	
2008	Modern Boy	Park Ga-song	
2008	Sweet Lie	Nice PD	
2009	Closer to Heaven	Aide team Kook Dong-sik	
2009	Where is Jung Seung-pil?	Director Park	
2009	Girlfriends	Department head	Cameo
2010	Secret Reunion	Gyeongsang Province chief	Cameo
2010	Twilight Gangsters	Police team leader	
2010	Haunters	Manager	Cameo
2011	My Black Mini Dress	Father of pre-college girl	Cameo
2011	Champ	Kwang-kyu	
2011	Countdown	Detective Park	
2013	Blood and Ties	Detective Kang	
2013	Marriage Blue	Doctor Kim	Cameo
2014	Hot Young Bloods	Dae-poong ("Typhoon")	Cameo
2014	A Dynamite Family		Cameo
2015	Love Forecast	Man in Hongdae without an office	Cameo
2016	Will You Be There?	Postman	Cameo
2016	Queen of Walking	Man-bok's father	
2017	The Sheriff In Town	Subsection chief Park	
2018	The Dude In Me	Kim Jong-ki	
2018	The Accidental Detective 2: In Action	Gwang-goo	
2018	Door Lock	Deputy head of department	
2021	New Year Blues	Civil affairs office chief	
2022	Birth	Im Chi-baek	

=== Television series ===
Year	Title	Role	Notes	Ref.
2003	Sang Doo! Let's Go to School			
2003	Jewel in the Palace	Lamp Holder		
2004	Into the Storm			
2004	Lovers in Paris	Man at bus stop	Cameo (Ep. 13)	
2004	Island Village Teacher	Driver	Cameo	
2004	When a Man Loves a Woman			
2004	Ireland	Man at river	Cameo (Ep. 2)	
2005	Eighteen, Twenty-Nine			
2005	Fashion 70s	Detective		
2006	Special of My Life	Senior detective		
2006	Mr. Goodbye	Kwon Bok-haeng		
2006	Please Come Back, Soon-ae	Harassing male passenger		
2006	Couple or Trouble	Department head Gong Young-gu		
2006	Freeze	Inspector Jang	Cameo	
2006	Princess Hours	Teacher	Cameo (Ep. 2)	
2007	Hello! Miss	Chief Kwak		
2007	Legend of Hyang Dan	Ui-jik		
2008	Successful Life	Choi Dong-joon		
2008	The Secret of Coocoo Island	Section chief Kim		
2008	Drama City – Disciplinary Committee	Park Seung-gyu		
2009	The Accidental Couple	Post office team leader Go		
2009	Soul	Bae Seong-bin		
2009	Hometown of Legends – Forbidden Book	Jeon Ki-soo		
2009	Assorted Gems	Plastic surgeon	Cameo	
2009	Will It Snow for Christmas?	Homeroom teacher	Cameo	
2010	Oh! My Lady	Han Min-kwan		
2010	The Miracle of Love	Jang Gap-dol		
2010	KBS Drama Special – Our Slightly Risque Relationship	Cameraman		
2010	KBS Drama Special – Summer Story	Bong Pil-ho		
2010	Sungkyunkwan Scandal	Hwang-ga		
2010	KBS Drama Special – Snail Dormitory			
2011	Welcome to the Show	Manager		
2011	Listen to My Heart	Director of botanical garden		
2011	Scent of a Woman	Yoon Bong-kil / Ramses		
2011	Lights and Shadows	Pierre		
2011	Bolder By the Day	Go Dae-ro		
2012	Late Blossom	Go Seok-ho		
2012	A Gentleman's Dignity	Teacher	Cameo (Ep. 4)	
2012	Arang and the Magistrate	Lee Bang		
2012	Jeon Woo-chi	Park Myung-gi		
2012	My Kids Give Me a Headache	Gas station customer	Cameo	
2013	You Are the Best!	Manager Shin	Cameo	
2013	The Queen of Office	Manager Han		
2013	Pots of Gold	Jung Byung-dal		
2013	I Can Hear Your Voice	Judge Kim Gong-sook		
2013	KBS Drama Special – Yeon-woo's Summer	Cleaning manager		
2013	Potato Star 2013QR3	Director Oh		
2013	The Suspicious Housekeeper	Eun Han-kyul's homeroom teacher		
2013	Reply 1994	Na Chang-seok	Cameo (Ep. 5)	
2014	Wonderful Days	Kang Sang-shik		
2014	Triangle	Internal affairs detective		
2014	Boarding House 24th St.	Boarding house owner		
2014	Dodohara (Be Arrogant)	Ha Ra's apartment owner	Cameo (Ep. 10)	
2014	Pinocchio	Kim Gong-joo		
2015	Angry Mom	Kang Ja's Homeroom teacher	Cameo (Ep. 2)	
2015	Warm and Cozy	Mr. Choi	Cameo (Ep. 1)	
2015	Splendid Politics	Yi Yeong-bu		
2016	Marriage Contract	Park Ho-joon		
2016	Gogh, The Starry Night	Person at the funeral	Cameo (Ep. 1–2)	
2016	Hwarang: The Poet Warrior Youth	Pi Joo-ki		
2017	Save Me	Woo Choon-kil		
2017	Hospital Ship	Choo Won-gong		
2017	Rain or Shine	Delegate	Cameo (Ep. 1)	
2018	Lawless Lawyer	Kong Jang-soo		
2018	The Undateables	Kim So-wool	Cameo	
2018	Still 17	Violin repairman		
2018	Your Honor	Hong Ran's ex-husband		
2018	My Strange Hero	Song Yoo-taek		
2019	Spring Turns to Spring	Bang Kwang-gyu		
2019	Trap	Squad Chief Jang Man-ho		
2019	The Secret Life of My Secretary	Director at interview	Cameo (Ep. 3)	
2019	Diary of a Prosecutor	Hong Jong-hak		
2020	Team Bulldog: Off-Duty Investigation	Gang boss	Cameo (Ep. 1)	
2020	Was It Love?	Hong Pyeon		
2020	Graceful Friends	Fantastic Film CEO		
2021	She Would Never Know	Kim Joong-hyuk		
2021	The Penthouse: War in Life 2	Detective	Cameo (Ep. 8)	
2021	Somehow Family	Himself		
2021	Police University	Kang Seon-ho's homeroom teacher	Cameo (Ep. 1)	
2021	Lovers of the Red Sky	Choi Won-ho		
2022	Business Proposal	Shin Joon-hae		
2022	Our Blues	Kim Myung-bo		
2023	Bad Memory Eraser	Han Dong-chil		
2024	Knight Flower	Hwang Chi-dal		
2024	The Judge from Hell	Ahn Dae-young		

=== Web series ===
Year	Title	Role	Ref.
2020	Extracurricular	Byung-kwan	
2022	Dr. Park's Clinic	Ji Min-ji	

=== Television shows ===
Year	Title	Notes/Ref.
2011	Law of the Jungle: Papua	Cast member (Season 2)
2013–2015; 2022	I Live Alone	Cast member
2014	Saturday Night Live Korea	Host, episode 83
2014	Hello! Stranger	MC
2014	Health Report Returns	MC
2015	Three Meals a Day - Season 2	Cast member
2017	Battle Trip	Contestant with Ok Taec-yeon, episodes 37-38
2019	The Barber of Seville	Cast Member
2022	Hot Singers	Cast Member
2022	Tomorrow is a Genius	Cast Member
2022	Golf King 4	Special training assistant
2023	Brave Detectives 2	Special MC
2023	Rice Planting Club	Host

== Discography ==
=== Single album ===
Album information	Track listing
Open Sesame (열려라 참깨): Released: January 24, 2014; Label: Koen TN Entertainment/A&G Modes	Track listing: 1. "Open Sesame" (열려라 참깨); 2. "Open Sesame" (열려라 참깨) (Inst.)

== Awards and nominations ==
Name of the award ceremony, year presented, category, nominee of the award, and the result of the nomination
Award ceremony	Year	Category	Nominee / Work	Result	Ref.
Korea Drama Awards	2013	Excellence Award, Actor	Queen of the Office	Nominated	
MBC Entertainment Awards	2008	Popularity Award in a Sitcom or Comedy	The Secret of Coocoo Island	Won	
MBC Entertainment Awards	2013	Excellence Award in a Variety Show	I Live Alone	Won	
MBC Entertainment Awards	2014	Popularity Award in a Variety Show	I Live Alone	Won	
SBS Drama Awards	2013	Special Award, Actor in a Miniseries	I Can Hear Your Voice	Nominated	
SBS Entertainment Awards	2017	Best Entertainer Award	Burning Youth	Won	
SBS Entertainment Awards	2020	Excellence Award in Reality Category	Burning Youth	Won	
SBS Entertainment Awards	2025	Top Excellence Award (Show/Variety)	My Grumpy Secretary	Won	
