= Coffee Friends =

South Korean reality show

- Promotional poster
- Hangul: 커피프렌즈
- RR: Keopi peurenjeu
- MR: K'ŏp'i p'ŭrenjŭ
- Genre: Cooking show Reality show
- Starring: Yoo Yeon-seok; Son Ho-jun; Choi Ji-woo; Yang Se-jong
- Country of origin: South Korea
- Original language: Korean
- No. of seasons: 1
- No. of episodes: 10

Production
- Production locations: Jeju Island, South Korea
- Running time: 80 minutes
- Production company: CJ E&M

Original release
- Network: tvN
- Release: January 4 – March 8, 2019

Coffee Friends (Korean: 커피프렌즈) is a South Korean reality show program on tvN starring Yoo Yeon-seok, Son Ho-jun, Choi Ji-woo and Yang Se-jong.

It aired on tvN on January 4 and ended on March 8, 2019, broadcast on Fridays at 19:10 (KST).

== Synopsis ==
On a tangerine farm in Seogwipo, Jeju Island, four actors run a cafe where they serve brunch to visitors. The show was inspired by a donation project that Yoo Yeon-seok and Son Ho-jun ran each month in 2018. During the donation project, the two friends gave free cups of coffee in exchange for donations of any amount.

In this cafe, the menu does not list prices. Instead, customers are encouraged to donate what they want for their food and beverages.

The total profits earned by the project, 12,093,977₩ (roughly 10,200$), were donated in full to a charity for disabled children at the end of the show.

== Cast ==
| Name | Role | Episode | | | | | | | | | |
| Name | Role | 1 | 2 | 3 | 4 | 5 | 6 | 7 | 8 | 9 | 10 |
|---|---|---|---|---|---|---|---|---|---|---|---|
| Yoo Yeon-seok | Shop Owner, Main Cook | | | | | | | | | | |
| Son Ho-jun | Shop Owner, Coffee Brewer, Baker | | | | | | | | | | |
| Choi Ji-woo | Shop Manager | | | | | | | | | | |
| Yang Se-jong | All-Rounder Helper | | | | | | | | | | |
| Jo Jae-yoon | Dishwasher | | | | | | | | | | |
| Yunho (TVXQ) | Dishwasher | | | | | | | | | | |
| Baro (B1A4) | Part-time worker | | | | | | | | | | |
| Paik Jong-won | Part-time worker | | | | | | | | | | |
| Sehun (EXO) | Orange seller & Dishwasher | | | | | | | | | | |
| Nam Joo-hyuk | Bread delivery man (7), Part-time worker (8-10) | | | | | | | | | | |
| Kang Daniel | Temporary part-time worker | | | | | | | | | | |

== Ratings ==
Coffee Friends : South Korea viewers per episode (millions)

| Season | Episode number | | | | | | | | | | Average |
| Season | 1 | 2 | 3 | 4 | 5 | 6 | 7 | 8 | 9 | 10 | Average |
|---|---|---|---|---|---|---|---|---|---|---|---|
| 1 | 1.162 | 1.281 | 1.328 | 1.107 | 1.242 | 1.489 | 1.549 | 1.233 | 1.218 | 0.908 | 1.252 |

Source: Audience measurement performed nationwide by Nielsen Media Research.

Average TV viewership ratings
| Ep. | Original broadcast date | Average audience share (AGB Nielsen) | |
| Ep. | Original broadcast date | Nationwide | Seoul |
|---|---|---|---|
| 1 | January 4, 2019 | 4.901% | 6.151% |
| 2 | January 11, 2019 | 4.951% | 6.697% |
| 3 | January 18, 2019 | 5.380% | 6.493% |
| 4 | January 25, 2019 | 4.258% | 5.421% |
| 5 | February 1, 2019 | 5.139% | 5.947% |
| 6 | February 8, 2019 | 5.879% | 7.166% |
| 7 | February 15, 2019 | 6.135% | 6.878% |
| 8 | February 22, 2019 | 5.137% | 5.518% |
| 9 | March 1, 2019 | 4.321% | 4.876% |
| 10 | March 8, 2019 | 3.960% | 4.534% |
In this table below, the blue numbers represent the lowest ratings and the red numbers represent the highest ratings.; Ratings listed do not include commercial time, which regular ratings usually do.
