= Earth Arcade =

South Korean variety TV show

- Promotional poster for Season 3
- Hangul: 뿅뿅 지구오락실
- RR: Ppyongppyong jigu oraksil
- MR: Ppyongppyong chigu oraksil
- Genre: Reality Show
- Written by: Lee Woo-jung (Season 1-2)
- Directed by: Na Young-seok; Park Hyun Yong
- Starring: Lee Eun-ji; Mimi (Oh My Girl); Lee Young-ji; An Yu-jin (Ive)
- Country of origin: South Korea
- Original language: Korean
- No. of seasons: 3
- No. of episodes: 35

Production
- Running time: 60–100 minutes
- Production company: CJ ENM

Original release
- Network: tvN
- Release: June 24, 2022

Earth Arcade (Korean: 뿅뿅 지구오락실) is a South Korean reality-variety show that aired on tvN on June 24, 2022. The four heros: Ahn Yujin, Lee Eun-ji, Lee Young-ji, and Mimi are grouped together to capture a moon rabbit Torong that has escaped to Earth. They travel through time and space to catch the target.

== Synopsis ==
On the Moon, the Jade emperor runs the best restaurant that specializes in space rice cakes. The store only has one staff Torong, a rabbit that runs the place by himself. One day, the Jade emperor orders Torong to put in more effort as the line of customers is getting longer. Fed up with his attitude, Torong hops to Earth and leaves a resignation letter at the cash register. When the Jade emperor discovers his note, he is outraged and puts a bounty on Torong. Four heroes from Earth set off to catch him.

== Cast ==
- Lee Eun-ji
- Mimi (Oh My Girl)
- Lee Young-ji
- An Yu-jin (Ive)

The producers intended to create a young female cast. Involved in the decisions were the writers and more than 20 production crew members. They voted and nominated potential female celebrities to be cast.

Lee Young-ji was the first to be cast. She received the most votes from the production crew members. The crew asked Lee's manager and they declined the offer as Lee was staying away from variety shows to focus on her music career. After the refusal, the crew still continued to ask for Lee Young-ji on the show. Eventually, her manager told Lee Young-ji about the show and she accepted.

Lee Eun-ji was then cast as the second member. She was mentioned by producer Nam Kyung-mo and managing director Park Sung-jae. The crew did a background check on her and viewed a positive image of her. They contacted Lee and she accepted the invitation.

The crew decided that they needed idol members. At that time, Ive had just debuted, with Lee Woo-jung and Na Yeong-seok being interested in their debut song Eleven. The producers got into contact with a colleague Yoon In-hoe who previously cast An Yu-jin as a guest on his show. She was successfully cast.

Mimi from Oh My Girl was the last to be cast. Director Park Hyun-yong was diagnosed with COVID-19, and while quarantining with his wife, they would watch YouTube videos. His wife suggested to watch Oh My Girl's Mimi. Park would later bring up Mimi as a potential cast member, and the rest of the crew would soon agree to cast her as they gained a positive reception from her online presence.

== List of episodes ==
Season 1
| Episode Number | Broadcast Date | Locations |
|---|---|---|
| 1 | June 24, 2022 | Sangam-dong, Korea; Bangkok, Thailand |
| 2 | July 1, 2022 | Bangkok, Thailand |
| 3 | July 8, 2022 | Bangkok, Thailand |
| 4 | July 15, 2022 | Bangkok, Thailand |
| 5 | July 22, 2022 | Ko Samui, Thailand |
| 6 | July 29, 2022 | Ko Samui, Thailand |
| 7 | August 5, 2022 | Ko Samui, Thailand |
| 8 | August, 12th, 2022 | Ko Samui, Thailand |
| 9 | August 19, 2022 | Ko Samui, Thailand |
| 10 | August 26, 2022 | Goseong, Korea |
| 11 | September 2, 2022 | Goseong, Korea |
| 12 | September 16, 2022 | Goseong, Korea |

Season 2
| Episode Number | Broadcast Date | Locations |
|---|---|---|
| 1 | May 12, 2023 | Itaewon, Korea; Helsinki, Finland |
| 2 | May 19, 2023 | Helsinki, Finland |
| 3 | May 26, 2023 | Helsinki, Finland |
| 4 | June 2, 2023 | Helsinki, Finland |
| 5 | June 9, 2023 | Rovaniemi, Finland |
| 6 | June 16, 2023 | Sangam-dong, Korea |
| 7 | June 23, 2023 | Bali, Indonesia |
| 8 | June 30, 2023 | Bali, Indonesia |
| 9 | July 7, 2023 | Bali, Indonesia |
| 10 | July 17, 2023 | Bali, Indonesia |
| 11 | July 21, 2023 | Bali, Indonesia |
| 12 | July 28, 2023 | Bali, Indonesia |

Season 3
| Episode Number | Broadcast Date | Locations |
|---|---|---|
| 1 | April 25, 2025 | Abu Dhabi, United Arab Emirates |
| 2 | May 2, 2025 | Abu Dhabi, United Arab Emirates |
| 3 | May 9, 2025 | Abu Dhabi, United Arab Emirates |
| 4 | May 16, 2025 | Abu Dhabi, United Arab Emirates |
| 5 | May 23, 2025 | Abu Dhabi, United Arab Emirates |
| 6 | May 30, 2025 | Lisbon, Portugal |
| 7 | June 6, 2025 | Lisbon, Portugal |
| 8 | June 13, 2025 | Lisbon, Portugal |
| 9 | June 20, 2025 | Albufeira, Portugal |
| 10 | June 27, 2025 | Albufeira, Portugal |
| 11 | July 4, 2025 | Nonhyeon-dong, Korea |

== Spin-offs ==
A spin-off Vroom! Vroom! (뛰뛰빵빵) was broadcast on tvN on May 24, 2024. About two hours later after its first broadcast, it would be released on YouTube channel fullmoon (채널십오야). It features the cast each obtaining their driver license.

On July 31, 2026, another spin-off, Space Rice Cake Shop (우주떡집) premiered on tvN. The cast will run a rice cake shop as a penalty for failing a mission in Season 2. Karina, Doh Kyung-soo, and Gabee appeared as guest part-time workers.

== Ratings ==
Season 1
| Episode # | Broadcast Date | AGB Ratings (nationwide) |
|---|---|---|
| 1 | June 24, 2022 | 2.183% |
| 2 | July 1, 2022 | 2.460% |
| 3 | July 8, 2022 | 2.575% |
| 4 | July 15, 2022 | 2.637% |
| 5 | July 22, 2022 | 2.925% |
| 6 | July 29, 2022 | 3.069% |
| 7 | August 5, 2022 | 2.939% |
| 8 | August, 12th, 2022 | 3.523% |
| 9 | August 19, 2022 | 2.908% |
| 10 | August 26, 2022 | 3.813% |
| 11 | September 2, 2022 | 3.516% |
| 12 | September 16, 2022 | 2.741% |
| Average | | 2.940% |

Season 2
| Episode # | Broadcast Date | AGB Ratings (nationwide) |
|---|---|---|
| 1 | May 12, 2023 | 3.493% |
| 2 | May 19, 2023 | 3.774% |
| 3 | May 26, 2023 | 3.554% |
| 4 | June 2, 2023 | 3.835% |
| 5 | June 9, 2023 | 3.364% |
| 6 | June 16, 2023 | 3.518% |
| 7 | June 23, 2023 | 3.312% |
| 8 | June 30, 2023 | 3.265% |
| 9 | July 7, 2023 | 3.755% |
| 10 | July 17, 2023 | 4.113% |
| 11 | July 21, 2023 | 3.475% |
| 12 | July 28, 2023 | 2.893% |
| Average | | 3.529% |

Season 3
| Episode | Broadcast Date | AGB Ratings (nationwide) |
|---|---|---|
| 1 | April 25, 2025 | 2.850% |
| 2 | May 2, 2025 | 2.426% |
| 3 | May 9, 2025 | 2.696% |
| 4 | May 16, 2025 | 3.087% |
| 5 | May 23, 2025 | 2.618% |
| 6 | May 30, 2025 | 2.440% |
| 7 | June 6, 2025 | 2.599% |
| 8 | June 13, 2025 | 2.637% |
| 9 | June 20, 2025 | 2.240% |
| 10 | June 27, 2025 | 1.912% |
| 11 | July 4, 2025 | 2.036% |
| Average | | 2.503% |

== Nominations and awards ==
| Award ceremony | Year | Category | Work/Subject | Result | Ref. |
|---|---|---|---|---|---|
| Baeksang Arts Awards | 2023 | Best Entertainment Program | Earth Arcade (Season 2) | Nominated | |
| Baeksang Arts Awards | 2023 | Best Female Variety Performer | Lee Eun-ji (Earth Arcade S2) | Won | |
