= The Game Caterers =

2021–2022 South Korean television show

- Poster for The Game Caterers 2
- Also known as: Fifteen Nights on a Business Trip
- Hangul: 출장 십오야
- Lit.: Fifteen Night Business Trip
- RR: Chuljang siboya
- MR: Ch'ulchang siboya
- Genre: Game show
- Written by: Lee Woo-jung
- Directed by: Shin Hyo-jeong (Season 1–2); Ha Moo-seong (Season 1); Cho Eun-jin (Season 2)
- Presented by: Na Yeong-seok
- Country of origin: South Korea
- Original language: Korean
- No. of seasons: 2
- No. of episodes: 48

Production
- Producer: Na Young-seok
- Production location: South Korea
- Editor: Shin Hyo-jung
- Production company: CJ ENM

Original release
- Network: tvN; YouTube (international)
- Release: March 12, 2021 – March 4, 2022 (Main)

The Game Caterers (Korean: 출장 십오야) is a South Korean variety show that airs on tvN and a re-run on YouTube channel, 'Fullmoon' after the broadcast. This program is tvN's short-form content following the previous Don't Look Back.

== Background ==
The Game Caterers is a new concept entertainment delivery service in which producer Na Yeong-seok (Na PD) visits official broadcasting events and entertainment programs of various guests, regardless of entertainment or drama, and plans to bring laughter to guests through multiple games played in New Journey to the West or Channel 15 Nights.

A total of 19 teams in the span of both seasons appeared on the show. In season 1, 51 people were on seven business trips, from the first business trip Hospital Playlist Goes Camping to BH Entertainment. In season 2, The Game Caterers draws attention by trying to expand the format as a unique feature of picnics that inevitably require long recordings. When asked about the secret to recruiting guests for each episode, PD Ham Moo-seong of the show said, "I try to make the atmosphere at the scene comfortable by packing the staff in the smallest possible size. It seems that this part is well known to artists and officials." Six out of 19 teams are entertainment agencies such as Antenna, BH Entertainment, Artist Company, YG Entertainment, Hybe Label, and Starship Entertainment.

Games

All guests require to play the game with prizes to be won. With more than four players, the sequence will go down and back (each person gets two rounds except the last person). If the players succeed in the first round, they will receive all the prizes. If one of the players fails, they need to pick one prize and return it to The Game Caterers staff. The game will restart to player number one with the remaining prizes.

- Famous People quiz/Guess Who/Snack game/Character Quiz – The players have to name the picture of a person/character/snack shown by Na PD in three seconds.
- Shout in Silence/Scream in Silence – Two players (a guesser and an interpreter) should face each other, both wearing headphones. The staff will play songs loud enough that the players are hard to hear what other players are saying. A helper will stand behind the guesser with a word. The interpreter is given the task of explaining the word to the guesser. In season one, episode twelve, this game is played as a group, with the first player passing the word to the second player and continuing until the last player. The team wins if the last player says the exact and correct word.
- Terms in Order/Pirate Quiz – An altered game just for tvN's variety show producers and The Pirates: The Last Royal Treasure. The game requires a quiz board of different categories and score points drawn in a table. Each square contains keywords/questions/hints that are related to them.
- Korean-Only Ping-Pong – This is a ping-pong game where English words are forbidden. The points will go back to zero if the player says it. Examples are okay, wow, zero, yes, fighting, serve, nice, English names (Sam Kim, RM, Suga, J-Hope, V), etc.
- Word Continuation/Word Relay – The staff will give the players a category/ending/number of a word/questions. Each player gets 3 seconds to answer. The game continues until a player is stumped or repeats the same word and cannot continue the chain. Example: -won, -seok, chicken brand, ramen brand, three letter word; what food do you eat in a Chinese restaurant? etc.
  - Word Relay with Exceptions – The player must answer one-syllable words except for rice and soup dishes.
- Drawing in Succession – The players have to choose one person to guess, and that person will sit at the end of the round. * The remaining players will get ten seconds each to do a drawing based on the sayings/famous movie quotes/famous movie lines/song titles the staff gave.
- Dragon Balls – It is a one-attempt game for players to win one million won. In season one, episode nine, the players must collect seven dragon balls. Each player will have an individual mission. If the player succeeds in a challenge, the player will receive a dragon ball. Then, they can proceed to a group mission if they collect all seven dragon balls. If they succeed, the staff will grant their wishes.
- Strawberry Game – It is a 4-beats/8-beats game; a player attacks with another player's nickname and that other player will have to repeat its name four times/move eight points (starting with the 4-beats and continue with a left shoulder up, right shoulder up, head down and head up).
- Daily 4-letter word/Four-syllable Word – Na PD will give the word, and the player has to continue it. Examples: sun-glass, hwegngdan-bodo (crosswalk), namhaeng-yeolcha (train), anjeon-jidae (safety zone), etc.
- Body Language/Isimjeonsim Game – A group/2-people mission that requires the players to stand, and the staff will yell out a word, and the players must strike a pose that suits the word in three seconds. In a 2-person game, a director (a person who will hold the sketchbook) and two players; a guesser and a describer.
- What Are You Doing? – T This game is a spinoff of New Journey to the West "What are You Doing Now." The players have to complete various missions written on the cards with a time limit of thirty minutes. Suppose other players fail their tasks; those who succeed will divide up the winnings equally.
  - What are you doing on the Moon Right Now? – This game is specifically for the casts of The Silent Sea. Each player was assigned to task based on their characters in the series. The game will start when Na PD says, "We'll take a break," and the players must complete their task within ten minutes.
- Operation Party Hat – It is a group mission where a player must stand on the opposite side of the other players with party hats in front of their faces. The other players must find the player on the opposite side and form a straight line in ten seconds.
- Music Quiz – The staff will play any movie soundtracks/idol songs. The players must listen and guess the movie title/song title and group name and dance to the music.
- Famous Line Quiz – It is a group mission where the staff will show a picture of a scene from a famous movie, and the players have to guess the script from that scene. All players on the team must answer to win the prize. If a team fails to respond, the other team can answer.
- Speed Game – Two players (a guesser and an interpreter) should face each other. A helper will stand behind the guesser with a word. The interpreter is given the task of explaining the word to the guesser. The team with more answers wins within a time limit of 2 minutes.
- Balance Game – Each player will receive a whiteboard to write their answer. If every player chooses the same answer, they will receive the prize. Example: ramyeon or steak?
- Say the Strength – This game is a spin-off of the I Am Ground game and is specifically for Girls' Generation. There is a four-beat rhythm that is created by hitting the thighs (1 beat), clapping (2 beat), and snapping the left (3 beat) and right fingers (4 beats). The first person will start by calling out a person to go with their name and the strength/weakness within the completion of the four beats, meaning ending on the last snap and not the thighs. If the member thinks that person made up their strength/weakness for the show, make a time-out sign to let the staff know. That person must defend, and the other members will decide if that person is out or in.
- Red HYBE Green HYBE – This game is a spin-off to the Red Light, Green Light game. The players all stand inside a semicircle. Then, they will walk forward when the tagger says Green HYBE and pick an item from four coolers, a coffee station, and drinking water bottles. They will walk until they reach the yellow finish line with their preferred drinks. The player must avoid getting caught by the tagger.
- A Pair Race – Each team picks two players with strength and intelligence. The chosen players would've to stand before the starting line. After hearing the sound of the whistle, the players will start running until the finishing line and pick a piece of paper out of six that contains a mission. That player has to choose a person that can complete the task.
- Nana Cafeteria – The players will answer random questions prepared by Na PD. If they answer, they can choose which lunch meal they want. If they fail, the players will have to return to the line's end. The game only opens for 10 minutes, first come, first serve.
- Korean Proverb Relay – The players must provide an answer as long as it is close to the proverb's meaning.
- Random Play Dance – The players all stand outside the line; when the music plays, don't go past a cat plushie. A professor is selected among the players to determine if the players are in or out of the game. The eliminated players will also work alongside the professor. They will judge the player's dancing knowledge.
- Reverse Rock-paper-scissors – It is a Rock paper scissors game between the guest and Na PD. The players have to shout the opposite of the result in 3 seconds. If the player wins, they have to shout 'I lose'; if the player loses, they have to shout 'I win.' When it's a draw, the players have to shout 'gaegol' (Korean: 개골; lit. '"ribbit"') and continue playing. If every player in a team wins twice, they win. In season two, Starship Entertainment's special episode, this game is played in one attempt.
- Relay Confidential Assignment Mission – This game is specifically for the casts of Confidential Assignment 2: International. The staff prepared games that can be played during Chuseok Day; jegichagi, yut, gonggi, ddakji, and a game of removing the table cloth without dropping or falling the tablewares. Each player gets 99 seconds to complete the mission they were assigned.
- Charades – This game requires one player (an interpreter) from each team to explain the keywords given by the staff, and the remaining players (the guesser) in the team will have to guess it. The team with the highest score within 3 minutes will win the game.
- Dice Stack – The game requires a cup and three dice. While moving the cup in a swinging motion the cup back and forth across the table, the player needs to collect three dice into the cup. When the player stops swinging, the cup is lifted with all three dice stack together. Each player was given 5 minutes to practice.

== Overview ==
Season	Episodes		Originally aired		Time slot (KST)
Season	Total	Special	First aired	Last aired	Time slot (KST)
1	14	13	March 12, 2021	June 4, 2021	Friday at 22:50
1	14	1	June 13, 2021		Friday at 22:50
2	34	9	December 26, 2021	March 4, 2022	Friday at 22:30 or 22:40
2	34	1	July 10, 2022		Friday at 22:30 or 22:40
2	34	3	July 15, 2022	July 29, 2022	Friday at 22:30 or 22:40
2	34	2	August 5, 2022	August 12, 2022	Friday at 22:30 or 22:40
2	34	1	September 9, 2022		Friday at 22:30 or 22:40
2	34	3	November 6, 2022	November 20, 2022	Sunday at 22:40
2	34	1	January 27, 2023		Friday at 22:30
2	34	2	February 3, 2023	February 10, 2023	Monday at 22:30
2	34	1	February 20, 2023		Monday at 22:30
2	34	1	April 2, 2023		Sunday at 18:00
2	34	1	April 26, 2023		Wednesday at 18:50
2	34	1	May 5, 2023		Friday at 22:00
2	34	2	May 12, 2023	May 19, 2023	Friday at 22:40
2	34	1	November 29, 2024		Friday at 20:40
2	34	2	October 22, 2025	October 29, 2025	Wednesday at 22:30
2	34	3	November 5, 2025	November 19, 2025	Wednesday at 22:50

Notes

- In season 1, it was aired for 5 minutes at 22:50 on Friday. After the broadcast, the full version was released on the Fullmoon YouTube Channel.
- In season 2, episode 1 was aired for 20 minutes at 22:50 on December 24, 2021. Then, starting from episode 2, which airs on January 7, 2022, it aired for 5 minutes on Friday at 22:30. After the broadcast, the full version was released on the Fullmoon YouTube Channel.

== Episodes ==
=== Season 1 ===
The Game Caterers season one episodes
No. overall	No. in season	Team	Original release date	Guest(s)	South Korea viewers (millions)
1	1	Hospital Playlist (Note: The episodes with five main cast members of TVN/Netflix's drama Hospital Playlist going on a two-days-and-one-night camping trip together to celebrate their new season. The episodes are title Hospital Playlist Goes Camping X The Game Catheres.)	March 12, 2021	Shin Won-ho, Jo Jung-suk, Yoo Yeon-seok, Jung Kyung-ho, Kim Dae-myung, and Jeon Mi-do	0.549
Na PD brought former 2 Days & 1 Night writer and current New Journey to the West writer with him to Yulje Hospital located at Pocheon, the northeast of Gyeonggi Province. There, he met the producer of Hospital Playlist, Shin Won-ho, who also took part in pranking the guests. The guest had to play the "Famous People Quiz" that was played in New Journey to the West for them to win back their camping food supplies. Prizes: Oysters, liquor, grilled dried pollack, shine muscat grapes, kimchi-jjigae ingredients, breakfast kit with sliced beef brisket, and aged filet steak).
2	2	Hospital Playlist	March 19, 2021	Shin Won-ho, Jo Jung-suk, Yoo Yeon-seok, Jung Kyung-ho, Kim Dae-myung, Jeon Mi-do	0.607
The guests played "Shout in Silence", and the members were rearranged as pairs as Team Meoktae (Kim Dae-myung and Shin Won-ho), Jo Jung-suk and Jeon Mi-do Team and Hot Mess Team (Yoo Yeon-seok and Jung Kyung-ho). After the game, the guest prepared dinner with the food they had won. In the second part, the team played a "Mafia Game". Each person received two CJ vouchers at the start of the game. If the mafia wins, the voucher citizens must go to the mafia, and vice versa. Prizes: Two CJ vouchers
3	3	Antenna	March 26, 2021	You Hee-yeol, Jung Jae-hyung, Peppertones, Sam Kim, Kwon Jin-ah, Lee Jin-ah	0.504
Na PD surprised the guest while they were in a meeting. All seven guests played "Terms in Order" starting with Shin Jae-pyung (Peppertones), Lee Jang-won (Peppertones), You Hee-yeol, Jung Jae-hyung, Lee Jin-ah, Kwon Jin-ah, and Sam Kim. (Note: In bonus round, You Hee-yeol exchanged places with Sam Kim) Prizes: Coffee machine, foot massager, electric scooter, ginseng root, oxtail, bidet, orchid plant and a bag of rice.
4	4	Antenna	April 2, 2021	You Hee-yeol, Jung Jae-hyung, Peppertones, Sam Kim, Kwon Jin-ah, Lee Jin-ah	0.445
The guests played "Korean-Only Ping-Pong", and the guests were rearranged into teams of three with Team Hee-yeol (Note: The team consisted of You Hee-yeol, Sam Kim, and Kwon Jin-ah) (led by You Hee-yeol) and Team Jae-hyung (Note: The team consisted of Jung Jae-hyung, Shin Jae-pyung (Peppertones) and Lee Jin-ah) (led by Jung Jae-hyung). (Note: Lee Jang-won of Peppertones was excluded from this game because he won a game before this episode. However, to get the big prize, he gets to bet which team will win.) For the third game, Na PD brought along The Dragon God and its dragon balls, which were used in New Journey to the West. The guest will receive a massive prize of one million won if they win . (Note: Voice appearances through phone by Lucid Fall and Park Sae-byul.)
5	5	tvN's variety show producers	April 16, 2021	Kim Min-seok, Lee Jin-ju, Jung Jong-yeon, Lee Tae-kyung, Yoo Ho-jin, Park Hee-yeon	0.401
This episode was filmed at tvN's headquarters in Sangam-dong with guests Kim Min-seok (produced You Quiz on the Block), Lee Jin-ju (produced Youth Over Flowers, Three Meals a Day), Jung Jong-yeon (produced The Genius, Society Game and The Great Escape, Girls' High Mystery Class), Lee Tae-kyung (produced Life Bar, DoReMi Market), Yoo Ho-jin (produced Wednesday Music Playlist, Hometown Flex, Unexpected Business) and Park Hee-yeon (produced Grandpas Over Flowers, Father and I, Home Food Rescue 3, Street Food Fighter). Next, the guest played the "Name Game". Prizes: Terra beer (First place), 300,000 won gift card to Baekkobjib BBQ restaurant (Second place), 200,000 won gift card to a café (Third place), and 100,000 won gift card to Korean fast dining restaurant (Fourth place), a bag of rice (Fifth place), and New Journey to the West merchandise (Last place).
6	6	Webtoon artist + YouTuber	April 23, 2021	Joo Ho-min, Kim Poong, Lee Malnyeon, Lee Jong-beom	0.384
Na PD introduced guests Joo Ho-min (written and illustrated Along with the Gods), Kim Poong (written and illustrated History of Losers, World of the Dejected), Lee Malnyeon (written and illustrated New Journey to the West) and Lee Jong-beom (written and illustrated Dr. Frost). They were asked to do a self-portrait of a character or an icon they usually draw using Samsung Galaxy Tab S7. Next, the guest played the "Famous People Quiz". Prizes: Samsung Galaxy Tab S7, sitz bath, Curble chair, kids drawing tablet, scalp massager, vitamin D3 drink, and back-to-basic art kit.
7	7	Webtoon artist + YouTuber	April 30, 2021	Joo Ho-min, Kim Poong, Lee Malnyeon, Lee Jong-beom	–
The guest had mukbang with Puradak Chicken and Terra beer while talking about work life. Na PD provided a game related to their work, "Drawing in Succession", with Joo Ho-min as the guesser. The third game is "Dragon Balls".
8	Special	Vincenzo	May 2, 2021	Song Joong-ki, Jeon Yeo-been, Yoon Byung-hee, Im Chul-soo, Choi Deok-moon, Lee Hang-na, Kim Young-woong, Lee Dal, Jung Ji-yoon, Yang Kyung-won, Seo Ye-hwa, Kim Yoon-hye, Kim Seol-jin, Kim Hyung-mook, Ri Woo-jin, Kwon Seung-woo	–
At Geumga Plaza, a set from Vincenzo, all sixteen guests were introduced by Na PD according to the guests' designated floor in Geumga Plaza. They played the "Strawberry Game" as a warm-up game, and the winner received two bottles of Bogo, an Italian wine, and a trophy. Next, the guests played the "Daily 4-letter word", (Note: Six players play this game Song Joong-ki, Yoon Byung-hee, Ri Woo-jin, Kim Young-woong, Im Chul-soo, Seo Ye-hwa) Shout in Silence with three teams in pairs: Team Jipuragi Couple, (Note: The team consisted of Song Jong-ki and Jeon Yeo-been) Team Pawnshop Couple (Note: The team consisted of Yang Kyung-won and Seo Ye-hwa) and Team Nanyak Temple (Note: The team consisted of Ri Woo-jin and Kwon Seung-woo) and "Isimjeonsim Game". Prizes: Foot massager, eight Seoul Land tickets, multivitamin Centrum, travel-size tissues, ten boxes of Jinro soju and ten boxes of Terra beer, fifty hand fans, beef, sixteen cans of spam, a flower basket, three camping chairs, and a small gold bar or chocolate gold bars.
9	8	BTS (Note: This episode is a collaboration between Run BTS Episode 141 and TV producer-director Na Young-seok (Na PD). The episodes are title The Game Cateres X Run BTS.)	May 7, 2021	Jin, Suga, J-Hope, RM, Jimin, V, Jungkook	0.354
Na PD surprised the guest while they were filming Run BTS playing Mafia game. He started off with basic questions such as questions related to the guest, food and BBQ. Next, they played the "Famous People Quiz". While they were cooking, they took turns in meeting Na PD at the Room of Secrecy. Then, they played "What Are You Doing?". Prizes: BBQ ingredients such as kimchi, rice, every part of beef (First game) and gift cards worth 700,000 won (Second game)
10	9	BTS (Note: This episode is a collaboration between Run BTS Episode 142 and TV producer-director Na Young-seok (Na PD). The episodes are title The Game Cateres X Run BTS.)	May 14, 2021	Jin, Suga, J-Hope, RM, Jimin, V, Jungkook	354
The guests were divided into two teams of three with Team V (Note: The team consisted of V, J-Hope, RM) (Note: Suga was excluded from this game because he was injured. However, to get the big prize, he gets to bet which team will win.) (led by V) and Team Jimin (Note: The team consisted of Jin, Jimin, Jungkook) (led by Jimin). Suga act as a referee. Next, they play "Dragon Balls". Prizes: Trophy (First game) and the staff will grant the player's wishes (Second game)
11	10	BH Entertainment	May 21, 2021	Choo Ja-hyun, Lee Jin-wook, Park Hae-soo, Han Ji-min, Han Hyo-joo, Kim Go-eun, Ahn So-hee	352
All seven guests were introduced by Na PD. They talked about their current projects. The guests played "Strawberry Game". Prizes: Camping chair
12	11	BH Entertainment	May 28, 2021	Choo Ja-hyun, Lee Jin-wook, Park Hae-soo, Han Ji-min, Han Hyo-joo, Kim Go-eun, Ahn So-hee	349
The guests played "Word Continuation". Prizes: A scooter, hammock and shade, a griddle set, a beam projector and a few LPs, forty-eight neck fans, forty-eight sun protection caps, seven copies of cartoon art by Lee Malnyeon, forty-eight CJ gift cards worth 50,000 won (Note: Special appearance by Park Bo-young due to scheduling conflict.) and a life-size Lee Byung-hun cutout.
13	12	BH Entertainment	June 4, 2021	Choo Ja-hyun, Lee Jin-wook, Park Hae-soo, Han Ji-min, Han Hyo-joo, Kim Go-eun, Ahn So-hee	254
The guests played three rounds of "Body Language Game"; Korean films, foreign films and proverbs. Choo Ja-hyun as the director who will call two names to play. The guests were paired into three groups: Park Hae-soo and Han Hyo-joo, Lee Jin-wook and Kim Go-eun, and Han Ji-min and Ahn So-hee. For special round, Emotion category, Choo Ja-hyun paired with Han Hyo-joo. Next, they play "Scream in Silence" in group and in pair with Lee Jin-wook and Kim Go-eun. Prizes: For the first game, Fullmoon company card for one million won at yang gopchang restaurant (Round 1), one million won at beef restaurant (Round 2) and one million won at cafe (Round 3). For the second game, prizes they lost during the Word Continuation game.
14	Special	Sinkhole	June 13, 2021	Cha Seung-won, Kim Sung-kyun, Lee Kwang-soo, Kim Hye-jun	–
The guest were introduced by Na PD and they talked about the film Sinkhole. Next, they played "Strawberry Game" and "Shout in Silence". The guests were paired into Team Cha Seung-won and Kim Sung-kyun, and Team Lee Kwang-soo and Kim Hye-jun. For final game, they played "Guess Who". Prizes: Exclusive promotion interview (First and second game) and one thousand advance premier tickets (Third game).

=== Season 2 ===
The Game Caterers season two episodes
No. overall	No. in season	Team	Original release date	Guest(s)	South Korea viewers (millions)
15	1	Dr. Park's Clinic	December 26, 2021	Lee Seo-jin, Ra Mi-ran, Cha Chung-hwa, Seo Bum-june, Shin Eun-jung, Jung Hyung-suk, Kim Kwang-kyu	579
Na PD introduced the guest, and they talked about the drama and the chemistry between the casts in Dr. Park's Clinic. The guests played "Word Continuation Game" and "Music Quiz". In the "Music Quiz", the guests were divided into two teams, Team Seo Jin (Note: The team consisted of Lee Seo-jin, Cha Chung-hwa and Shin Eun-jung) and Team Mi Ran. (Note: The team consisted of Ra Mi-ran, Jung Hyung-suk, Seo Bum-june and Kim Kwang-kyu) Lee Seo-jin took on the challenge of naming the title, main cast and short synopsis after hearing the movie soundtracks in the 1980s played by the staff. Prizes: Energy drink Bacchus-F, aroma oil, massage gun, acupressure slippers, scalp caring device, wild ginseng, blueberries, Gongjin-dan, premium tea bags, and air purifying plant (First game), CJ vouchers worth 50 thousand won (Second game) and one month of free TVING subscription to 1,000 subscribers (Third game).
16	2	Artist Company	January 7, 2022	Jung Woo-sung, Lee Jung-jae, Yum Jung-ah, Kim Ye-won, Kim Jong-soo, Shin Jung-geun, Jang Dong-joo, Cho Yi-hyun, Lim Ji-yeon, Pyo Ji-hoon	362
Na PD introduced all ten guests, and they talked about their current film project. The staff prepared the gifts based on the Artist Company's staff request. The guests played "Guess Who". Prizes: Bidet, instant coffee mix, acupressure slippers, paid vacation, feet heater, Canon EOS R6, PlayStation 5, Coway's air purifier, HUTECH's massage chair, and a signed poster of City of the Rising Sun featuring the lead actors, Jung Woo-sung and Lee Jung-jae.
17	3	Artist Company	January 14, 2022	Jung Woo-sung, Lee Jung-jae, Yum Jung-ah, Kim Ye-won, Kim Jong-soo, Shin Jung-geun, Jang Dong-joo, Cho Yi-hyun, Lim Ji-yeon, Pyo Ji-hoon	–
The guests played "Famous Line Quiz", and they were rearranged into two teams of five with Team AS (Note: The team consisted of Kim Jong-soo, Shin Jung-geun, Lim Ji-yeon and Kim Ye-won) (led by Jung Woo-Sung) and Team ACOM (Note: The team consisted of Yum Jung-ah, Cho Yi-hyun, Jang Dong-joo, Pyo Ji-hoon) (led by Lee Jung-Jae). For a special round, both leaders joined in a mission of playing the jegichagi game to win prizes for the employees at Artist Company. Prizes: Korean beef from Hoengseong (first round), sea bream from Jeju (second round), honey from Jirisan and 6 years old ginseng from Guemsan (third round), cockles from Beolgyo and seaweed from Gijang (fourth round), strawberry (fifth round) and New Journey the Wests calendar, a special prize from Sangam-dong and CJ vouchers (sixth round). For the special round, prizes they lost during the "Guess Who" game.
18	4	The Pirates: The Last Royal Treasure	January 21, 2022	Kim Sung-oh, Kang Ha-neul, Lee Kwang-soo, Han Hyo-joo, Chae Soo-bin, Park Ji-hwan, Oh Se-hun	313
Before shooting The Pirates x The Game Caterers, Na PD came to meet the guests in the waiting room. Fullmoon Theater prepared 7 movie tickets for the guests to pick a seat. The ticket is a scratch ticket that has a letter and the number of the seat. Na PD introduced the guest, and they talked about the film The Pirates: The Last Royal Treasure. To win the prizes, the guests get to draw tickets from a pouch that contains 100 tickets, including the prizes. (Note: To win, the guests have to collect 7 tickets (First place), 6 tickets (Second place), 5 tickets (Third place), 4 tickets (Fourth place), 3 tickets (Fifth place), 2 tickets (Sixth place), 1 ticket (Last place)) The guests played the "Pirate Quiz" and "Pop-up Pirate Game" which the guests had to pick a sword and stick the sword into the barrel. If the player manages to stick it into the barrel without the pirate popping out, the player will receive 100 tickets. If every player succeeds, they will receive 1000 tickets. Prizes: In first game, Premium beef, Johnnie Walker Blue Label scotch whisky, Samsung Galaxy Z Fold 3, CJ vouchers, Dyson hair dryer, and 37.5g gold bar. In second game, one thousand advance premier tickets.
19	5	The Silent Sea	January 28, 2022	Bae Doona, Gong Yoo, Lee Joon, Lee Sung-wook, Lee Moo-saeng, Kim Sun-young, Jung Woo-sung	–
Before shooting The Silent Sea x The Game Caterers, the cast gather in a room with Na PD one at a time. Na PD introduced the guest, and they talked about the series The Silent Sea and their character. The guests played "What are you Doing on the Moon Right Now?" after Na PD gave the signal "We'll take a break". Prizes:
20	6	The Silent Sea	February 4, 2022	Bae Doona, Gong Yoo, Lee Joon, Lee Sung-wook, Lee Moo-saeng, Kim Sun-young, Jung Woo-sung	452
The guests continued to play "What are you doing on the Moon Right Now?". For the second game, "Scream in Silence", the guests were paired into three groups: Lee Joon and Lee Moo-saeng, Kim Sun-young and Lee Sung-wook, Gong Yoo, and Bae Doona. Jung Woo-sung as the helper. Prizes: A pure gold rabbit bar. For the second game, a Fullmoon card (First place), two CJ gift cards (Second place), and a congratulatory card (Third place)
21	7	tvN's variety show producers 2	February 18, 2022	Yang Jung-woo, Lee Woo-hyung, Park Hyun-young, Kim Sae-hee	409
This episode was filmed at tvN's headquarters in Sangam-dong with guests Yang Jung-woo (produced Rakkinam, The Dictionary of Useless Knowledge, Racket Boys), Lee Woo-hyung (produced Grandpas Over Flowers, Three Meals a Day, 4 Wheeled Restaurant), Park Hyun-young (produced New Journey to the West, Spring Camp, Youth Over Flowers - Africa, Kang's Kitchen, Earth Arcade), and Kim Sae-hee (produced Youn's Kitchen, Great Escape, Youn's Stay, Youth Over Flowers - Iceland, Racket Boys). The guests talked about the year they joined tvN and their current and upcoming projects. Then, they play "Speed Game" in groups of two with Team Colleague (Note: The team consisted of Yang Jung-woo and Lee Woo-hyung) and Team Senior-Junior, (Note: The team consisted of Park Hyun-young and Kim Sae-hee) and "Guess Who". Prizes: For one thousand won, the winner (2 players) can choose any restaurant and pay using Fullmoon's company card (First game). Acupressure slippers, New Journey to the West merchandise, cards that younger producers wrote for the guests, a whiskey, producer Shin Hyo-jung's edit coupon, and one hundred coupons for Dongdaemun Yeogi tteokbokki (Second game).
22	8	YG Entertainment	February 25, 2022	Eun Ji-won, Lee Chan-hyuk, Jinu, Kang Seung-yoon, Mino, Kim Jin-hwan, Song Yun-hyeong, Jennie, Choi Hyun-suk, Jihoon	502
Na PD assigned the guests to their seats according to their debut date. Starting from Eun Ji-won debuted in 1997, Lee Chan-hyuk, Jinu, and Mino debuted in 2014, Kim Jin-hwan and Song Yun-hyeong debuted in 2015, Jennie debuted in 2016, Choi Hyun-suk and Jihoon debuted in 2020. They talked about their group's greeting and favourite or well-known respective songs. They played the "Strawberry Game" as a warm-up game and the "Guess Who Game". Kang Seung-yoon made a special appearance on the show, and for this, Na PD introduced a new game, Snack Name, as a special round. Prizes: A YG Strawberry King trophy (First game). For the second game, Incheon rice, a gift set of Myohan, an inventory box (contains Johnnie Walker Blue Label scotch whisky, Samsung Galaxy Z Fold 3, and Dyson hair dryer), acupressure slippers, cartoon art by Lee Malnyeon, premium beef, balloon flower extract tonic, a gift certificate for a coffee truck and snack truck, and Gentle Monster and Jennie collaboration Jentle Home collection.
23	9	YG Entertainment	March 4, 2022	Eun Ji-won, Lee Chan-hyuk, Jinu, Kang Seung-yoon, Mino, Kim Jin-hwan, Song Yun-hyeong, Jennie, Choi Hyun-suk, Jihoon	–
The guests continue to play "Guess Who" and "Music Quiz". For the "Music Quiz", the guests were mixed and rearranged into two teams; Team Jennie (Note: The team consisted of Mino, Jennine, Kim Jin-hwan, and Song Yun-hyeong) (Note: Jinu was excluded from this game because he was discharged from the army recently. However, to get the big prize, he gets to bet on which team will win.) and Team Answer. (Note: The team consisted of Eun Ji-won, Lee Chan-hyuk, Choi Hyun-suk, and Jihoon) Prizes: Canola oil sets, daily necessities set, seasoned tuna can develop, spam set, red ginseng set. MVP received a gift certificate worth 1,000 won.
24	Special	Emergency Declaration	July 10, 2022	Song Kang-ho, Lee Byung-hun, Kim Nam-gil, Im Si-wan, Kim So-jin, Park Hae-joon, Han Jae-rim	–
Na PD introduced the guest, and they talked about the film Emergency Declaration, how Han Jae-rim cast casts, and their character. The guests played "Balance Game" and "Guess Who". For the special game "Famous Line Quiz", the guests were divided into two groups: Team Emergency (Note: The team consisted of Song Kang-ho, Lee Byung-hun, and Kim Nam-gil) and Team Declaration. (Note: The team consisted of Im Si-wan, Kim So-jin, Park Hae-joon, Han Jae-rim) Prizes: One thousand Emergency Declaration movie tickets to Fullmoon subscribers. For the second and special game, a travel kit, a chance to appear on Lee Truck Lee Byung-hun's business variety show, a chance to appear on Youth Over Flowers with Song Kang-ho, One thousand Emergency Declaration movie tickets, hotel voucher, a flight ticket worth one thousand won, organic honey from Jirisan, a bottle of whiskey, Josun Hotel meat and kimchi, and watermelon from Gochang.
25	Special	Hybe Label (Note: The episodes are title HYBE Goes Picnic.)	July 15, 2022	Lee Hyun, Baekho, Minhyun, Seventeen, Fromis 9, TXT, Enhypen, Le Sserafim	–
The guests appeared on the camping site in Yeoju. All 36 guests are assigned to their respective tents, with Baekho, Minhyun, and Lee Hyun in the same tent as Team TT, followed by Le Sserafim, Seventeen, (Note: Seventeen members that appeared on the show are Jun, Joshua, Hoshi, The8, Mingyu, Seungkwan, and Dino.) Enhypen, TXT, and Fromis 9, respectively. The guests were required to present themselves uniquely. For the first game, the guests played "Red HYBE Green HYBE" to win to fill their empty ice cooler. Boo Seung-kwan of Seventeen was selected as the tagger. Next, they played "A Pair Race". Prizes: For the second game, a $200 department store gift voucher (First place twice), a $100 department store gift voucher (First place), a $50 CJ gift voucher (Second place), and $10 gift card (Last place).
26	Special	Hybe Label	July 24, 2022	Lee Hyun, Baekho, Minhyun, Seventeen, Fromis 9, TXT, Enhypen, Le Sserafim	–
The guests continue to play "A Pair Race" and "Nana Cafeteria". For the third game, the guest played a different game; "Character Quiz" (TXT, Seventeen and TT (Note: The team consisted of Baekho, Minhyun, and Lee Hyun)), "Korean Proverb Relay" (Fromis 9), "Word Relay with Exceptions" (Enhypen), and "Reverse Rock-paper-scissors" (Le Sserafim). Prizes: 3 types of lunch meals (Second game). Ice cream, iced americano, a cake, and watermelon (Third game).
27	Special	Hybe Label	July 31, 2022	Lee Hyun, Baekho, Minhyun, Seventeen, Fromis 9, TXT, Enhypen, Le Sserafim	–
The guests played "Random Play Dance" with Boo Seung-kwan of Seventeen was selected as the professor. Prizes: A snack truck (First place), a coffee truck (Second place), and a Dyson hair dryer (Special award)
28	Special	Girls' Generation	August 5, 2022	Taeyeon, Sunny, Tiffany, Hyoyeon, Sooyoung, Yoona	–
Na PD introduced all six guests, and they talked about their current solo project, the year they joined SM Entertainment, and the fifteenth-anniversary album Forever 1. The guests played "Say the Strength" and "Scream in Silence". The prize for the game is to commemorate their fifteenth anniversary. Champagne is a rose colour drink made in 2007, its debut year and official colour. For Scream in Silence, the guests were divided into three pairs; Sunny and Yoona, Taeyeon and Tiffany, and Hyoyeon and Sooyoung. Prizes: Rose colour champagne from 2007
29	Special	Girls' Generation	August 12, 2022	Taeyeon, Sunny, Tiffany, Hyoyeon, Sooyoung, Yoona	–
The guests continue to play "Guess Who" and "Music Quiz". For "Music Quiz", the guests are rearranged into two teams; Team King of Singers (Note: The team consisted of the vocalist of the group, Taeyeon, Tiffany, and Sunny) and Team Diva. (Note: The team consisted of the dancers of the group, Hyoyeon, Sooyoung and Yoona) The quiz covers the history of Korean pop music in four periods, the Zero period (before 2007), the First period (2007–2011), the Second period (2012–2017), and the Third period (after 2018). Prizes: For the second game, a 15th-anniversary wreath, delivery app vouchers, Girls' Generation first album tape Girls' Generation, 37.5g gold bar, "Forever 1" music video will be played on TV and Youtube after Na PD's variety show Earth Arcade, massage gun, balloon flower extract tonic, ramyeon, rice, dog treats. For the third game, chicken and ginseng soup and honey (first round), a fruit basket (second round), Gongjin-dan (third round), ginseng (fourth round), and beef (final round).
30	Special	Confidential Assignment 2: International	September 9, 2022	Hyun Bin, Yoo Hae-jin, Im Yoon-ah, Daniel Henney, Jin Seon-kyu	–
Na PD introduced the guest, and they talked about the film Confidential Assignment 2: International and their character. The guests played "Character Quiz" and "Relay Confidential Assignment Mission". Prizes: For the first game, tissue, a bag of rice, a spam set, a set of cooking paste, a box of mushrooms, a box of premium cheese, premium beef, a collection of oil combo for making pancakes, and a box of bath products. For the second game, one hundred movie tickets times the remaining seconds.
31	Special	Starship Entertainment (Note: The episodes are titled Starship First Fall Outing.)	November 6, 2022 (Note: The October 30 broadcast was canceled due to the aftermath of the Itaewon Halloween crowd crush and aired on November 6 instead.)	Song Seung-heon, (Note: As the pillar or the leader of Starship Entertainment during the Starship: The First Fall Outing.) Lee Dong-wook, Yoo Yeon-seok, Lee Kwang-soo, Kim Bum, Son Woo-hyeon, Ryu Hye-young, Chae Soo-bin, Shin Seung-ho, Cheon Young-min, K.Will, (Note: As the director of Starship Entertainment during the Starship: The First Fall Outing because he was the first celebrity in Starship Entertainment and King Kong by Starship.) Monsta X, (Note: Monsta X members that appeared on the show are Minhyuk, Kihyun, Hyungwon, and Joohoney.) WJSN, (Note: WJSN members that appeared on the show are Exy, Seola, Bona, Soobin, and Dayoung.) Jeong Se-woon, Cravity, (Note: Cravity members that appeared on the show are Serim, Jungmo, Minhee, Hyeongjun, and Seongmin.) Ive (Note: IVE members that appeared on the show are Gaeul, Yujin, Rei, Wonyoung, and Liz)	–
The guests appeared at a studio in Misa-ri. All 31 guests, Team Solo, (Note: The team consisted of K.Will and Jeong Se-woon.) Team Actor 1, (Note: The team consisted of Song Seung-heon, Yoo Yeon-seok, Kim Bum, Ryu Hye-young, and Shin Seung-ho) Team Actor 2 (Note: The team consisted of Lee Dong-wook, Lee Kwang-soo, Chae Soo-bin, Son Woo-hyeon, and Cheon Young-min) Monsta X, WJSN, Cravity, and IVE were assigned to write their names down on the attendance book and find their name tags portrayed as a check-in. Every team with five members has to draw lots from a can and pick a paper that contains their seat number on a 2-hour bus journey from Misa-ri to Inje. Four out of five pieces have a seat number on them. If the guest picks a paper with 'Spare' written on it, that guest has to be separated from their team and joined as a member of Team Spare. (Note: The team consisted of Yoo Yeon-seok, WJSN's Seola, Cheon Young-min, Cravity's Seongmin, Ive's Rei) After checking in, Na PD explained the itinerary of their trip. The guest played "Reverse Rock-paper-scissors" for breakfast. The guests arrived at a Chinese restaurant. There were five tables with Team Solo and Monsta X at the same table. For the second game, the guest played a different game for each round; "Word Relay – Ending word" (Round one), "Word Relay – Questions" (Round two), and "Word Relay – Category" (Round three). Then they reached Nature Experience school near the Nalincheon river. The guests were mixed and rearranged into four groups according to their food preferences: Team Yoo Nine (Note: The team consisted of Yoo Yeon-seok, Son Woo-hyeon, Ryu Hye-young, Chae Soo-bin, Shin Seung-ho, Jeong Se-woon, WJSN's Dayoung, Cravity's Hyeongjun, and IVE's Wonyoung. Yoo Nine took the team name from Yoo Yeon-seok's name and Nine because the group consisted of nine members.) (led by Yoo Yeon-seok), Team TSS (Note: The team consisted of Lee Dong-wook, Cheon Young-min, Monsta X's Hyungwon, WJSN's Exy, Cravity's Minhee, and IVE's Yujin and Rei who prefer tuna kimchi jjigae. The team name TSS stands for seven people, seven siblings.) (led by Lee Dong-wook), Team Mean (Note: The team consisted of Song Seung-heon, Monsta X's Minhyuk, Kihyun and Joohoney, WJSN's Seola and Soobin, Cravity's Seongmin and IVE's Liz who prefer vegetable bun than red bean bun. Team Mean took the team name from the team's youngest member Cravity's Seongmin.) (led by Song Seung-heon), Team Root (Note: The team consisted of K.Will, Lee Kwang-soo, Kim Bum, WJSN's Bona, Cravity's Serim and Jungmo, and IVE's Gaeul who prefer doenjang-jjigae than naengmyeon. The team was named Root because the leader of the group K.Will was the root of Starship Entertainment and King Kong by Starship as he was the first celebrity.) (led by K.Will). The guests played two rounds of "Music Quiz"; First round songs released after 2010 (Team Yoo Nine vs. Team Root and Team TSS vs. Team Mean and Team TSS vs. Team Yoo Nine) and second-round songs released before 2010 (Team Root vs. Team Mean and Team TSS vs. Team Yoo Nine and Team Root vs. Team Yoo Nine). Prizes: For the Reverse Rock-paper-scissors game, a fruity breakfast set for the winner, and sweet potatoes, potatoes, and crackers for the losing team. For the Word Relay game, Fried dumplings (Round one), sweet and sour pork (Round two), cream shrimp (Round three), and beer or Kaoliang liquor (Special request for Team Actor 1 and 2). For Music Quiz, premium apples (Round one).
32	Special	Starship Entertainment	November 13, 2022	Song Seung-heon, Lee Dong-wook, Yoo Yeon-seok, Lee Kwang-soo, Kim Bum, Son Woo-hyeon, Ryu Hye-young, Chae Soo-bin, Shin Seung-ho, Cheon Young-min, K.Will, Monsta X, WJSN, Jeong Se-woon, Cravity, Ive	–
The guests continued to play the second round of the "Music Quiz" of songs released before 2010 (Team Root vs. Team Mean and Team TSS vs. Team Yoo Nine and Team Root vs. Team TSS). Then, the guest played different games; a "Four-syllable Word" (IVE), "Character Quiz" (Cravity), "Snack Game" (WJSN), and "Music Quiz of movie and drama soundtracks" (Team Actor 1 and 2). Prizes: For Music Quiz, premium pears (Round two). For the "Four-syllable Word", "Character Quiz", "Snack Game", "Music Quiz", and the guests' favourite food.
33	Special	Starship Entertainment	November 20, 2022	Yoo Yeon-seok, Lee Kwang-soo, Son Woo-hyeon, Shin Seung-ho, Cheon Young-min, K.Will, Monsta X, WJSN, Jeong Se-woon, Cravity, Ive	–
Monsta X and Team solo played "Character Quiz". On day two of the outing, five actors were absent from the event, including Song Seung-heon, Lee Dong-wook, Kim Bum, Ryu Hye-young, and Chae Soo-bin, due to filming shooting. For Team TSS, Monsta X's Hyungwon replaced Lee Dong-wook as the new team leader, and Team Mean's new leader was Monsta X's Joohoney. The guests played "Charades" with proverbs, movie titles, food, and emotions categories. The game started with Team Mean, Team TSS, Team Root, and Team Yoo Nine. For their last game, they played "Random Play Dance". Prizes: Monsta X and Team solo favourite food. The last top 3 players get a coffee truck and can request it anytime, anywhere. The final player gets a CJ gift voucher worth one thousand won.
34	Special	Comedy Big League	January 27, 2023	Kim Doo-young, Lee Eun-ji, Kim Young-myung, Hwang Jae-seong, Shin Kyu-jin, Park Kyung-ho	–
This episode was filmed after the shooting of Comedy Big League at CJ ENM's headquarters. The guests introduced themselves and talked about their roles and segments in the show. The guests played "Word Relay" and "Charades". Prizes: For the first game, an air purifier, a robot vacuum, a massage gun, tissues, rice, whiskey, joke books, a face soap set, producer Jung Moo-won super pass, and a personal promotion pass. For the second game, 100$ per question and prizes they lost during the "Word Relay" game.
35	Special	Big Bet	February 3, 2023	Im Hyung-joon, Son Suk-ku, Kim Joo-ryoung, Son Eun-seo, Lee Dong-hwi, Lee Hae-woo	–
The guests were seated according to their age, starting from the oldest (Im Hyung-joon) to the youngest (Lee Hae-woo). The guests introduced themselves and they talked about the drama, their roles, and shooting in the Philippines. The guests played "Strawberry Game". Prizes: CJ vouchers worth $300
36	Special	Big Bet	February 10, 2023	Im Hyung-joon, Son Suk-ku, Kim Joo-ryoung, Son Eun-seo, Lee Dong-hwi, Lee Hae-woo	–
The guests played the "Character Quiz" and "Dice Stack". Prizes: Hotel buffet coupon, liquor gift coupon, business class flight ticket, a basket filled with tropical fruits, golf gloves, lottery, acupuncture slippers, rice puff, and 37.5g gold bar. For the second game, Big Bet season 2 promotion video for a week and a department store gift voucher worth 2000 won.
37	Special	Jinny's Kitchen	February 20, 2023	Lee Seo-jin, Park Seo-joon, V, Jung Yu-mi, Choi Woo-shik	–
The guests were seated according to their roles in Jinny's Kitchen, starting from CEO (Lee Seo-jin), director (Jung Yu-mi), senior manager (Park Seo-joon), and interns (Choi Woo-shik and V). The guests played "Word Relay" and "Character Quiz". Prizes: For the first game, a flamingo tube, a basket filled with apple mangoes, one thousand layers of lavers, a bottle of Clase Azul Reposado tequila, Jinny's Kitchen will air 10 seconds of the guest's scene at the end of the show, informal talk time, work promotion for Jinny's Kitchen season 2, CJ gift voucher worth $1000, digital camera worth $1000, premium Korean beef worth $300, Geneva speaker, massage gun worth $300, and a bouquet of 100 red roses. For the second game, a department store gift voucher worth 2000 won.
38	Special	Kill Boksoon	April 2, 2023	Jeon Do-yeon, Sul Kyung-gu, Kim Si-a, Esom, Lee Yeon	–
39	Special	Dream	April 26, 2023	Park Seo-joon, IU, Kim Jong-soo, Ko Chang-seok, Jung Seung-gil, Lee Hyun-woo, Yang Hyun-min, Hong Ahn-pyo, Heo Joon-seok	–
40	Special	Seventeen	May 5, 2023	S.Coups, Jeonghan, Joshua, Jun, Hoshi, Wonwoo, Woozi, DK, Mingyu, The8, Seungkwan, Vernon, Dino	–
41	Special	Seventeen	May 12, 2023	S.Coups, Jeonghan, Joshua, Jun, Hoshi, Wonwoo, Woozi, DK, Mingyu, The8, Seungkwan, Vernon, Dino	–
42	Special	Seventeen	May 19, 2023	S.Coups, Jeonghan, Joshua, Jun, Hoshi, Wonwoo, Woozi, DK, Mingyu, The8, Seungkwan, Vernon, Dino	–
43	Special	SM Entertainment's SM Town	November 29, 2024	Kangta, Max Changmin, Leeteuk, Hyoyeon, Key, Suho, Seulgi, Doyoung, Karina, Wonbin	–
44	Special	JYP Entertainment's JYP Nation	October 22, 2025	J.Y. Park, 2PM, (Note: 2PM members that appeared on the show are Jun. K, Nichkhun, and Wooyoung.) Day6, Twice, (Note: Twice members that appeared on the show are Nayeon, Jeongyeon, Jihyo, and Dahyun.) Stray Kids, (Note: Stray Kids members that appeared on the show are Bang Chan, Changbin, Hyunjin, and I.N.) Itzy, (Note: Itzy members that appeared on the show are Lia, Ryujin, Chaeryeong, and Yuna.) Xdinary Heroes, (Note: Xdinary Heroes members that appeared on the show are Gunil, O.de, Jun Han, and Jooyeon.) Nmixx, (Note: Nmixx members that appeared on the show are Lily, Haewon, Sullyoon, and Jiwoo.) NiziU, (Note: NiziU members that appeared on the show are Mako, Rima, Miihi, and Nina.) Nexz, (Note: Nexz members that appeared on the show are Tomoya, Yu, Haru, and So Geon.) KickFlip (Note: KickFlip members that appeared on the show are Kyehoon, Donghwa, Minje, and Keiju.)	–
45	Special	JYP Entertainment's JYP Nation	October 29, 2025	J.Y. Park, 2PM, Day6, (Note: Day6 members that appeared on the show are Sungjin, Young K, Wonpil, and Dowoon.) Twice, Stray Kids, Itzy, Xdinary Heroes, Nmixx, NiziU, Nexz, KickFlip	–
46	Special	Starship Entertainment	November 5, 2025	Song Seung-heon, Lee Dong-wook, Yoo Yeon-seok, Lee Kwang-soo, Kim Bum, Son Woo-hyeon, Chae Soo-bin, Shin Seung-ho, Kim Kyung-nam, Ahn Jee-hwan, K.Will, Monsta X, (Note: Monsta X members that appeared on the show are Shownu, Minhyuk, Kihyun, Hyungwon, and Joohoney.) WJSN, (Note: WJSN members that appeared on the show are Exy, Bona, Dayoung, and Yeonjung.) Cravity, (Note: Cravity members that appeared on the show are Jungmo, Hyeongjun, Wonjin, and Taeyoung.) Ive, (Note: IVE members that appeared on the show are Gaeul, Yujin, Rei, Wonyoung, Liz, and Leeseo.) KiiiKiii, (Note: KiiiKiii members that appeared on the show are Leesol, Sui, Jiyu, and Haum.) Idid (Note: Idid members that appeared on the show are Jang Yong-hoon, Kim Min-jae, Baek Jun-hyuk, and Jeong Se-min.)	–
47	Special	Starship Entertainment	November 12, 2025	Song Seung-heon, Lee Dong-wook, Yoo Yeon-seok, Lee Kwang-soo, Kim Bum, Son Woo-hyeon, Chae Soo-bin, Shin Seung-ho, Kim Kyung-nam, Ahn Jee-hwan, K.Will, Monsta X, WJSN, Cravity, Ive, KiiiKiii, Idid	–
48	Special	Starship Entertainment	November 19, 2025	Song Seung-heon, Lee Dong-wook, Yoo Yeon-seok, Lee Kwang-soo, Kim Bum, Son Woo-hyeon, Chae Soo-bin, Shin Seung-ho, Kim Kyung-nam, Ahn Jee-hwan, K.Will, Monsta X, WJSN, Cravity, Ive, KiiiKiii, Idid	–

== Poster ==
In the published poster for season 1, the design of the program's poster is reminiscent of a fifteen-year-old egg-shaped character with a fierce expression holding a flag and carrying a yellow suitcase. In the published poster for season 2, the program introduced a new character 'Fifteen Nyang'. The poster showed it was running recklessly forward, wearing a yellow cone hat and a sling bag. The bags contain game tools that Na Young-seok (PD Na) uses for his games, such as five dragon balls (orbs), a stopwatch, jegichagi, yut, a ping-pong paddle and a conical hat.

== Reception ==
On June 4, 2021, The Game Caterers Season 1 accumulated 34 million views on its Channel 15 Nights YouTube channel and reached a maximum of 200,000 concurrent users in real-time streaming. According to the Weekly Report on the Content Influence Index published by CJ ENM every week, The Game Caterers episodes with Hybe Label took second place for two consecutive weeks and topped the most influential entertainment show for the 4th week of July, July 25 – 31, 2022. As of December 2021, season 1 surpassed 150 million cumulative views on its YouTube channel.

In the first episode with Starship Entertainment, the number of views on YouTube exceeded 7.5 million in 13 days after its release. It rose ten places and ranked 7th in the non-drama TV topical category based on Good Data Corporation in the 2nd week of November.

== Ratings ==
- In the table below, the blue numbers represent the lowest ratings and the red numbers represent the highest ratings.
Season One

Average TV viewership ratings (nationwide)
Ep.	Original broadcast date	Average audience share (Nielsen Korea)
1	March 12, 2021	2.193% (2nd)
2	March 19, 2021	2.19% (2nd)
3	March 26, 2021	1.822% (4th)
4	April 2, 2021	1.909% (2nd)
5	April 16, 2021	1.533% (6th)
6	April 23, 2021	1.514% (4th)
7	April 30, 2021	0.973% (26th)
8	May 7, 2021	1.25% (9th)
9	May 14, 2021	1.495% (2nd)
10	May 21, 2021	1.591% (3rd)
11	May 28, 2021	1.449% (4th)
12	June 4, 2021	1.065% (13th)
Average		1.516%

Season Two

Average TV viewership ratings (nationwide)
Ep.	Original broadcast date	Average audience share (Nielsen Korea)
1	December 26, 2021	2.142% (11th)
2	January 7, 2022	1.408% (12th)
3	January 14, 2022	1.178% (23rd)
4	January 21, 2022	1.258% (13th)
5	January 28, 2022	0.905% (35th)
6	February 4, 2022	1.76% (4th)
7	February 18, 2022	1.594% (9th)
8	February 25, 2022	1.869% (8th)
9	March 4, 2022	1.526% (27th)
Average		1.516%
