= Kim Ye-won =

Kim Ye-won may refer to:

- Kim Ye-won (actress, born 1987) (born 1987), South Korean actress
- Kim Ye-won (entertainer) (born 1989), South Korean singer and actress, former member of girl group Jewelry
- Kim Ye-won (actress, born 1997) (born 1997), South Korean actress
- Kim Ye-won (singer, born 1998) (born 1998), stage name Umji, South Korean female singer, member of girl group GFriend
- Kim Ye-won (born 1999), South Korean female idol under Pledis Entertainment, member of group Pristin
