= Jinny's Kitchen =

South Korean reality television show

- Promotional poster for Season 1
- Also known as: Seojin's
- Seojinny-ne
- Genre: Cooking show Reality show
- Written by: Kim Dae-joo
- Directed by: Na Young-seok (season 1, 2 and TB); Park Hyun-yong (season 1 and TB)
- Starring: See list
- Country of origin: South Korea
- Original language: Korean
- No. of seasons: 2
- No. of episodes: 22

Production
- Production locations: Season 1 (Bacalar, Mexico); Season 2 (Reykjavík, Iceland)
- Running time: 90–110 minutes
- Production company: Egg is Coming (CJ ENM Studios)

Original release
- Network: tvN
- Release: February 24, 2023 – present

Related
- Youn's Kitchen; Youn's Stay; Jinny's Kitchen: Team Building

Jinny's Kitchen (also known as Seojin's or its full title Seojin's Korean Street Food; Korean: 서진이네) is a South Korean television reality show that premiered domestically on cable channel tvN and its platform streaming service TVING on February 24, 2023, and internationally on Prime Video. It is the first Korean entertainment show distributed worldwide by Amazon Prime. Both seasons comprise eleven episodes each.

It is the second spin-off of Youn's Kitchen (2017) after Youn's Stay (2021), with the goal of forming a franchise. A two-episode spin-off special, named Jinny's Kitchen: Team Building (출장소통의신 - 서진이네편), was later released on Amazon Prime.

== Premise ==
The show is a spin-off of the reality show Youn's Kitchen (2017), in which Lee Seo-jin becomes a restaurant owner after having worked as a manager under Youn in the initial series. He opens Jinny's Kitchen in the small town of Bacalar, in southeastern Mexico, to introduce Korean street food to customers.

In season 2, the cast flies to the capital of Iceland, Reykjavík, to serve warm and spicy Korean dishes. The store sign is thereby changed to read "Seojin Ttukbaegi" (Jinny's Kitchen hot pot). Seo-jin changed his attitude to put the customer first. Meanwhile, the head chef changes on a daily basis.

== Cast ==
Name	Role	
Name	Season 1	Season 2
Lee Seo-jin	Himself and the restaurant owner / CEO	Himself, the restaurant owner / CEO and head chef
Jung Yu-mi	Herself and executive director	Herself, managing director and head chef
Park Seo-joon (Note: Credited as "Park Seo Jun" on Amazon Prime.)	Himself, senior manager and the head of kitchen	Himself, director and the head of kitchen
Choi Woo-shik	Himself and an intern	Himself, assistant manager and head chef
Kim Tae-hyung / V of BTS	Himself and the new intern	—N/a (Note: Shown in episode 1 with footage from Na PD's YouTube channel show, The God of Gratitude.)
Go Min-si (Note: Credited as "Ko Min-si" on Amazon Prime.)	—N/a	Herself, the new intern and head chef

== Episodes ==
=== Series overview ===
Series overview
Season	Episodes	Originally released	
Season	Episodes	First released	Last released
1	11	February 24, 2023	May 5, 2023
Team Building	2	October 12, 2023	October 19, 2023
2	11	June 28, 2024	September 6, 2024

=== Season 1 ===
No. overall	No. in season	Original release date
1	1	February 24, 2023
In Seoul, the stars of the show—except V of BTS, who has other schedules—all gather to speak about the new program. Na PD announces his intent to extend the Youn's Kitchen franchise and introduces the new roles to the cast. Old Youn's Kitchen cast Lee Seo-jin, Jung Yu-mi and Park Seo-joon are promoted to executives while Choi Woo-shik stays an intern since he'll work for the first time in a restaurant. Because of his career, Woo-shik will also join the team in Mexico 2 days after. The main theme for this season is "snack bar", food that is usually sold in Korean streets, which concerns the new boss. Less than two weeks before opening, the executives meet with chef Lee Won-il to develop the menu and receive lessons in the kitchen. One week later, it's the interns turn to learn, before they fly to Mexico to discover the restaurant and the city the next week. As they test their recipes, do grocery shopping and get the preparations ready, they notice that it takes more time than they expect. They also determine the menu and set the price with the production staff. After an hour of waiting, they get their first customers. Menu: Bulgogi gimbap; Tuna gimbap; Fried tofu gimbap; Ramyeon (classic); Cheese ramyeon; Tteokbokki; Cheese Tteokbokki; Corn dog; Half-and-half corn dog; Water, sparkling water, coke and sprite (drinks)
2	2	March 3, 2023
The freshly opened Jinny's Kitchen instantly becomes one of the most popular restaurants in Bacalar. Intern Tae-hyung is now in charge on cooking the rice. So to always gain more, new items are added to the menu. On day 2, Woo-shik is back from Atlanta and is immediately thrown in the job. The cast also makes friend with a stray dog they nicknamed Seo Jin. Additional items: Spicy pork gimbap; Potato corn dog (aka Tater dogs); White wine and red wine (drinks)
3	3	March 10, 2023
They end day 2 busily, but it still isn't satisfying enough for the owner Lee Seo-jin. The cast think of a way to increase revenue while matching cultural Korean tradition and create "Jinny's combo". Plus, they add an extra spicy dish to the menu with Mexican tastes in mind. While the amount of tasks of interns Tae-hyung and Woo-shik keeps increasing, they start to feel very tired. The stray dog is renamed Perro (dog in Spanish). Additional items: Korean Sweet Chili Chicken (aka Spicy glazed fried chicken); Hellamyeon (extra spicy ramyeon with corn)
4	4	March 17, 2023
After their last three busy days and reaching Seo-jin's goal of 10,000 pesos, the boss gives a well-deserved day off to the team. The team spends time in their villa and on the lake, but when they reopen on Tuesday, they experience an empty restaurant for the first time with empty streets. To attract new customers they start to distribute brochures. Additional items: Fresh juices (apple and pineapple) (drinks)
5	5	March 24, 2023
As the night comes, Seo-jin decide to close early. They try a new dish with rice to follow various customers asks. The cast also discuss new strategies and goals. They discover that stores are closed on Wednesday and hope this will help us attract new customers. The next day, the employees confront Seo-jin on how he changed since becoming the boss. Interns are in charge of grocery shopping alone and take the opportunity to buy shirts in a local shop whilst Seo-jin gives a bilan on his employees. Additional items: Chibap (chicken-mayo rice); Fresh watermelon juice (drinks)
6	6	March 31, 2023
Since regular and new customers keep coming, they are quickly fully booked, forced to find extra chairs and the 10,000 goal is unexpectedly reached a second time. Yu-mi show again her meticulous side by helping in the back kitchen when needed. Tired Seo-joon wants to go home. On day 6, Tae-hyung assist the head chef and Woo-shik tries harder in the service. Additional items: Korean hot spicy chicken
7	7	April 7, 2023
The team keeps on dealing with heavy amount of customers. From the first half of the day, they already reach 6,000 pesos mark, leading them to make even better profit. Seeing his employees exhausted, Seo-jin suggest a morning off. To add more rice dishes, they decide to remove the Tteokbokki and the combos menus. Yu-mi offers to be in charge of these new dishes since only two days are left. While the team go jet skiing, Seo-jin go grocery shopping alone. Meanwhile, customers are already waiting in front of the restaurant. Additional items: Bulgogi rice; Spicy pork rice
8	8	April 14, 2023
For the penultimate day, the team wears the shirts previously bought by the interns and a Jinny's Kitchen patch. Day 7 starts with 3 reservations before opening and even Perro is already waiting in the restaurant. People not only come eating but also order take-outs. A rival restaurant visits Jinny's Kitchen too. So, to cope with the high number of customers they add a new table and a waiting list is created. Yu-mi manage to do 2 gimbap at once while Tae-hyung is suspected of stealing.
9	9	April 21, 2023
With the goal of 12,000 pesos in mind, the crew wears a special t-shirt with the restaurant logo and makes the biggest preparations since the start of the show. Tae-hyung makes his first corn dog. They also prepare a Dalgona game, repopularized by the Netflix series Squid Game. Seo-jin shares that he wants to remove his image of being a money-hungry person but seeing the restaurant running low, he announces that it won't close before they reach at least 10,000 pesos. The restaurant faces a rough start because of the England vs France match during the FIFA World Cup.
10	10	April 28, 2023
During quiet times, Seo-joon trains the interns: Tae-hyung for the corn dog and Woo-shik for the rice dishes. Despite minor mistakes at first, the team quickly handles the numerous orders, leading them to reach the 12,000 pesos goal at the last minute. They happily end the shooting.
11	11	May 5, 2023
The special episode starts with individual bilan interviews with the cast. Then, they reunites after 4 months over a meal and answers questions from viewers. Statistics on the journey, deleted scenes and interviews of customers are revealed. Finally, they play in two teams a traditional Korean board game called Yut Nori to win a luxury bottle of alcool and gift cards. To add to the difficulty, they are required to speak exclusively korean, without saying words from foreign languages. Teams oppose Seo-jin and Yu-mi against the three others.

=== Team Building ===
No. overall	No. in season	Original release date
-	1	October 12, 2023
On September 1st, the cast is invited in the new head office building of Egg is Coming (production company of the show). To strengthen the team spirit, Na PD has organized a retreat in Goseong consisting in a series of games for the cast, with the help of Earth Arcade and 2 Days & 1 Night crew. The CEO of Egg is Coming, Lee Myung-han, also offers them whiskey. The retreat starts with a competition to eat dakgalbi in Chuncheon, opposing the employers against interns and Ye-seul PD. They have to win a quiz, Jegichagi in Misa Gyeongjeong Park and Reverse Rock Paper Scissors in front of the restaurant. The loser has to grill the food for the winner team. Seo-jin doubts the purpose of the retreat that seems to tear them more apart but is ready to give it a chance if the show becomes more successful than Jinny's Kitchen. Finally, a Ddalgi game (Strawberry Game) determine in which room they will each sleep.
-	2	October 19, 2023
The cast ends the day as one united team with a game of completing the sentence to choose their dinner. Tired Woo-shik is particularly struggling. The next day, they are divided again to win gift cards through a speed quiz. They are separated in 3 teams with Woo-shik being in two of them. Then, as one team they play shoe archery, table tennis in doubles and group skipping against the show crew and lose.

=== Season 2 ===
No. overall	No. in season	Title	Original release date
12	1	"The Birth of Jinny's Ttukbaegi"	June 28, 2024
The cast reunites in the headquarters of Egg is Coming, meets new cast member Go Min-si, discuss promotions and dishes to serve, and learns about the new restaurant location. Then, days later they learn how to cook the three main dishes with the one-star Michelin Guide chef, Eom Tae-cheol, and practice for days. Gomtang and other pot dishes are set to be the signature dishes to warm the customers in the cold Reykjavík city. Later, they visit their restaurant next to Lake Tjörnin and observe the high prices in Iceland. With a bigger restaurant, they match bigger preparations and plan on opening 3 hours during lunch and dinner time. Seo-jin switches the restaurant motto into "customer is king". Although Seo-jin is proud to have an intern like her, Min-si is advised to take care of herself to avoid being overworked. Woo-shik burns himself but is selected as the first head chef by Seo-jin, thinking there won't be lots of customers. The restaurant becomes unexpectedly busy as soon as opened. Menu (+ side dish): Kkori-gomtang (Korean oxtail soup) (+ Kkakdugi); Beef galbijjim (Beef short rib stew) and Spicy beef galbijjim (+ Deep-fried vegetables); Dolsot-bibimbap (Korean vegan bibimbap served in hot pot) (+ Laver)
13	2	"The Debut of Rookie Chef"	July 5, 2024
Day 1 sets record as the best start in the franchise with 55 customers served. It becomes hectic in the kitchen as the restaurant is fully booked within minutes and additional orders are made. Woo-shik and Min-si still manage to quickly prepare orders. Yu-mi and Seo-joon occasionally jump in the kitchen to help and serve as a bridge between dining hall and kitchen. They run out of ingredients prepared to last several days and use their 3 hours-break to restart the preparation and grocery shopping. They also don't have enough printed menus. Despite being happy, Seo-jin feels sorry for sending people back without feeding them when they run out of ingredients once again. Seeing his staff tired, he asks them to stop working but Min-si especially won't stop. Additional items: Green plum tea, coke, yuzu tea, yuzu ade, beer, soju and sparkling water (drinks); Twibap ice cream (puffed rice and vanilla ice cream topped with sweetened red beans)
14	3	"The Return of Master Chef"	July 12, 2024
After a successful first day reaching 3,260,000 won, (Note: Approximately $2,443.60 as of March 22, 2024) Woo-shik receives a gold star for his work as head chef. Reserving Seo-joon for weekends, Yu-mi is appointed Chef du jour by Seo-jin making her anxious. Despite having a long queue waiting before opening, Yu-mi and Min-si peacefully deliver ordered dishes with Yu-mi's organization system. When a group of customers decides to pay separately, Seo-jin gets confused and miss one dish. Before the opening on dinner time, people that were turned down the day before came on reservation, leading other waiting customers to follow them. To prevent confusion, they make the decision to stop reservations. Additional items: Omija tea and omija ade (drinks)
15	4	"Captain Ace, Chef Seo-jun, Joins the Kitchen"	July 19, 2024
Day 2 ends smoothly and the golden star is handed over to Yu-mi. Seo-joon is the designed chef for day 3 and he prepares to introduce his signature dish, Dakgalbi, for dinner. Seo-joon and Min-si are particularly fast in the kitchen. Because of the weekend more people come and the waiting list is quickly completed. Seo-jin and Woo-shik are forced to refuse clients willing to wait, indicating their no reservation policy and the hour of the reopening for dinner. Additional items: Yuja tea (drink)
16	5	"There Comes An Aurora After Hard Work"	July 26, 2024
Seo-jin mistakenly adds one additional order for a table. Seeing that dish left alone in the kitchen, confused Woo-shik serves it to another table. When Yu-mi notices the error, Seo-jin and Woo-shik apologize, give the customers the original dish they ordered and additional gochujang sauce to bring home for free. More than an hour before the restaurant opens for dinner, a queue surrounds the building forcing the cast to speed up preparations. The waiting list is filled in advance and other people are told to stop waiting. When Seo-jin takes the first orders, Woo-shik is still setting up the group table while Seo-joon and Min-si are still doing dishes. Making noodles for the new Dakgalbi menu slower the kitchen a bit. Several fan customers share how they watched the show. The cast finally sees the aurora at night, which lifts their mood and makes them feel like they are in Iceland. Additional items: Dakgalbi (with noodles); Sprite (drink)
17	6	"Ace Chef Park's Reboot"	August 2, 2024
Min-si shares her opinion on the three chefs. Seo-joon stays the head chef and replaces galbijim by sundubu-jjigae on the menu, a dish his character played in the K-drama Itaewon Class. Seo-jin buys new uniforms. Seo-joon, Woo-shik and Min-si buy groceries while Seo-jin and Yu-mi make kimchi-jjigae for everyone. Some business management changes are made: Seo-jin decides to take order every 10 minutes instead of taking it all at once and Woo-shik makes it easier to wash dishes by letting the plates soak in a container with soapy water. The whole team feels more relaxed thanks to the new systems. Seeing that some dakgalbi dishes were not completely finished, the team decides to just use half a bag of noodles per person. Additional items: Sundubu-jjigae; Green plum ade, yuja ade (drinks)
18	7	"It's The Invitation Day!"	August 9, 2024
The cast and crew prepare a birthday surprise for Woo-shik. Yu-mi resumes her role as head chef, with beef galbijjim, yukjeon bibim-guksu, dolsot-bibimbap and kkori-gomtang on the menu. As a thanks to local people that helped on the Jinny's Ttukbaegi project, the restaurant is accessible on invitation only. In this way, the owner of their lodge (a celebrity chef), a driver, two local coordinators (or interpreters), a pottery studio owner, and a filming coordinators are invited with their family and friends. On the occasion, desserts are served with double ice scoops and with hotteok. Additional items: Yukjeon bibim-guksu
19	8	"Chef Choi's Secret Menu, Ttukbaegi Bulgogi"	August 16, 2024
Invitation day continues. For the dinner service, a local interpreter, an electrician, the owner of chairs and several other equipment (with one of them being also the owner of a ramen restaurant). On the next day, Woo-shik takes over the role of head chef, with spicy beef galbijjim, dolsot-bibimbap, kkori-gomtang and ttukbaegi bulgogi on the menu. His motto is to serve generously to warm customers on this cold weather. Seo-jin decides to try a new version of kkori-gomtang. The long waiting line is back, with even returning customers. Several groups of customers are led to share a table. On Yu-mi's advice and after making the crew laugh, Woo-shik prepares several servings of ttukbaegi bulgogi at the same time in one pan, instead of several individual ones, to speed up the dish that takes the longest to make. Seo-joon cooks one non-spicy galbijjim for a customer who is not good with spice. Woo-shik and Seo-jin offer kimchi and gochujang to take home to an American of Korean origin. Additional items: Ttukbaegi bulgogi

== Production ==
On November 9, 2022, tvN announced through various medias the project presented as more intense and fun than the healing and full of laughter Youn's Kitchen. It was also revealed that the menu will feature Korean street food.

=== Casting ===
The original cast of Youn's Stay, minus Youn Yuh-jung, who chose to focus on other projects, returned for Jinny's Kitchen. Lee Seo-jin, business graduate from NYU, is promoted as restaurant owner in the show while Jung Yu-mi becomes the executive. This new promotion is considered as key to the new season as the new owner's philosophy is all about revenue. Youn's Stay cast members Choi Woo-shik and Park Seo-joon also joined the cast.

Singer V of BTS, who is also known in the entertainment industry as part of a group of friends—with actors Park Seo-joon, Choi Woo-shik, Park Hyung-sik and rapper Peakboy—called the "Wooga Squad", was announced on December 7, 2022 after being spotted on the filming location by locals.

On February 20, 2024, SPOTV News revealed that the actress Go Min-si was offered to replaced BTS's V in the new season, absent due to mandatory military service. Yet, they also added that CJ ENM official declined to confirm it. On March 18, Go Min-si was spotted filming with the rest of the cast. It was revealed that she did various jobs, including as a wedding planner and part-time jobs at a barbecue restaurant and a cafe, before becoming an actress which comforted Na PD in his decision to have her join the show. She also played in the film The Witch: Part 1. The Subversion alongside Woo-shik and in the drama Live with Yu-mi.

=== Filming ===
Despite difficulties due to coordinating schedules of active Youn's Stay actors working on different projects, the initial plan—announced on November 9, 2022—of filming within the year and air in the first quarter of 2023, was followed. For safety reasons, the location was kept secret. While the TV show was filmed in Bacalar in Mexico, the special episode "Jinny's Kitchen Director's Cut with Na PD" took place in Itaewon-dong, Seoul in South Korea. The special episode reunited cast members to recall and talk about the memorable moments of the show and was filmed around May, about two months after the pre-recording of the press conference for Jinny's Kitchen. It aired as the 11th episode.

Pero, the stray dog that suddenly came to the restaurant during the filming of the show, has been adopted by one of the crew members living in Mexico, after paying for vaccinations and treatment for his sore leg.

On February 15, 2024, tvN informed through various medias that a second season was in the process. However, the filming location was kept secret like season 1 for safety and filming reasons, as well as the cast members. On the same day, according to SPOTV News, it was announced that the cast was scheduled to leave for Iceland in mid-March and begin filming Season 2. The filming started on March 18 in Reykjavík, Iceland, confirming the presence of Go Min-si and that the filming was not affected by the ongoing series of volcanic eruptions in the Reykjanes peninsula. Season 2 was set to be broadcast on June 28, 2024 with a goal to attract viewers before the Paris Summer Olympics.

== Promotion ==
In early February 2023, the cast featured in a special episode of The Game Caterers, Na Young-seok PD's YouTube variety show to promote Jinny's Kitchen.

In April 2023, Kim Tae-hyung group's BTS channel shared part of the Jinny's Kitchen Press Conference and of Tae-hyung's appearance in the Game Caterers. The press conference for season 2 has been shared on both Na PD and CJ ENM Global YouTube channels on June 28, 2024, the morning of the release of the first episode.

In a video filmed in the end of 2023 and posted on June 17, 2024 on Na PD's Youtube channel, Tae-hyung advised Go Min-si to be fast in her tasks and be ready for when he comes back from his military service. In July 2024, productor Na commented the first episode of the second season in a live YouTube broadcast alongside productor Park Hyun Yong and writer Kim Dae-joo who have both worked on Jinny's Kitchen. In this live, Na PD confirmed wanting Tae-hyung to rejoin the cast after his military service but with the hierarchy in the restaurant still to be determined.

== Reception ==
=== Critical response ===
Popular culture critic Kim Heon-sik analysed the anticipation of Jinny's Kitchen's international success by referring to BTS V as "a leading figure in K-culture" and pointing out that, if it is difficult for entertainment shows to be a global hit since it has to be based on cultural understanding, "the 'food' code is also advantageous from a multicultural perspective" and with the rise of interest in Korean culture, "[Jinny's Kitchen] doing business as K-food will be of interest to overseas viewers and will have points of empathy. [...] The appearance of V, a leading figure in K-culture, and the Hallyu craze with K-food and other things, combined with PD Na Young Seok's witty entertainment will create a synergy effect." With the same anticipation, the BBC cited Jinny's Kitchen while predicting Korean reality shows as "the next Korean cultural trend".

On March 26, 2023, Jinny's Kitchen ranked 15th in the "Most Watched TV Shows" category on Amazon Prime Video worldwide. It also entered the top 10 in 12 countries and regions, including Hong Kong, Singapore, Thailand, and Indonesia. It was stated by Manila Bulletin that FlixPatrol recorded that Jinny's Kitchen placed in the top 10 in 14 countries and territories on April 22, 2023, reaching number one in 8 of them. It remained the most watched TV show for the first half of 2023 on TVING, CJ ENM's streaming platform, as reported by India Today.

Reviews for the show have been mainly positive. To Philiana N. from TheWrap, Jinny's Kitchen stands out because of "how wholesome and unpretentious it is", the complicity between the cast and the appetizing food. She also describes it as "a refreshing reminder that there is value and joy to be had in a reality show that isn't loud or over-the-top, and instead celebrates the small, seemingly inconsequential wins that may be boring on paper but are extremely relatable to the everyday person." On IMDb, the series has a rating of 8.9 on 10 based on 3 800 critics.

According to Na PD during a YouTube live broadcast, the crew had to mention BTS V and the program's streaming platform Amazon to prove their credibility to the house owner for season 2 in Reykjavík (Iceland). While the owner was unaware of the show's popularity, the season 1 success led to the restaurant being fully booked in less than half an hour after the opening. Moreover, the new JTBC variety show My Name Is Gabriel originally scheduled to air every Friday at 20:50 (KST) was moved to 22:30 slot starting from the third episode (July 5) to avoid competition with Jinny's Kitchen. Ilgan Sports reminded us however that this mechanical evaluation solely based on viewership ratings isn't enough to correctly report the situation. Indeed, Jinny's Kitchen is a franchise entertainment program with a first season highly watched, broadcast on a channel (tvN) generally more viewed than JTBC and on a streaming platform (TVING) which has a much higher number of domestic subscribers than Disney Plus, where My Name Is Gabriel is released.
The change of schedule has resulted in an increase in viewership ratings for both programs. Jinny's Kitchen's Season 2 Episode 2 went up 1.2% leading to 8.1% while My Name Is Gabriel's third episode went up 0.3%, bringing it to 1.4%. Overall, the combined viewership ratings of the two programs went up 1.5 points from 8% on June 28 to 9.5% on July 5, 2024.

=== Viewership and ratings ===
According to data generated by Nielsen Korea, Jinny's Kitchen did a good score in terms of ratings. The first season reached its lowest ratings with its finale episode consisting of behind-the-scenes, interviews and sum-up of the journey. It still maintained its n°1 position as the highest-rated program of the day among non-terrestrial channel programs throughout the season, based on both the percentage of households subscribed to paid platforms and number of individuals estimated that tuned in. Conversely, Jinny's Kitchen: Team Building episodes dropped to 2nd place in the top 10 cable programming in terms of ratings, against the K-drama The Kidnapping Day, though the 1st episode kept its first place based on the estimated number of individuals watching the show.

- In the tables below,
  - the blue numbers marks the lowest ratings in each season and the red numbers marks the highest ratings.
  - the text in brackets () indicates the episode's position among top cable programs in terms of ratings.
  - "TB" refers to "Jinny's Kitchen: Team Building" season.
- This show airs on a cable channel/pay TV which normally has a relatively smaller audience compared to free-to-air TV/public broadcasters (KBS, SBS, MBC & EBS).

Jinny's Kitchen : South Korea viewers per episode (millions)

Season	Episode number											Average
Season	1	2	3	4	5	6	7	8	9	10	11	Average
1	2.219	2.278	1.914	2.102	1.810	2.056	1.980	1.930	1.921	1.859	1.905	1.998
TB	0.966	0.870	–									0.918
2	1.702	1.923	2.179	2.066	2.430	1.881	1.979	1.910	1.697	1.860	1.618	1.933

Source: Audience measurement performed nationwide by Nielsen Media Research.

==== Season 1 ====
Ep.	Broadcast date	AGB Nielsen	
Ep.	Broadcast date	Nationwide	Metropolitan
1	February 24, 2023	8.792% (1st)	10.338% (1st)
2	March 3, 2023	9.347% (1st)	11.120% (1st)
3	March 10, 2023	8.390% (1st)	9.390% (1st)
4	March 17, 2023	8.578% (1st)	9.852% (1st)
5	March 24, 2023	7.598% (1st)	8.649% (1st)
6	March 31, 2023	8.924% (1st)	10.839% (1st)
7	April 7, 2023	8.097% (1st)	8.893% (1st)
8	April 14, 2023	8.666% (1st)	9.952% (1st)
9	April 21, 2023	8.402% (1st)	9.913% (1st)
10	April 28, 2023	7.898% (1st)	9.562% (1st)
11	May 5, 2023	6.777% (1st)	7.763% (1st)
Average		8.315%	9.661%

==== Jinny's Kitchen: Team Building ====
Ep.	Broadcast date	AGB Nielsen	
Ep.	Broadcast date	Nationwide	Metropolitan
1	October 12, 2023	3.797% (2nd)	4.045% (2nd)
2	October 19, 2023	3.660% (2nd)	3.585% (2nd)
Average		3.729%	3.815%

==== Season 2 ====
Ep.	Broadcast date	AGB Nielsen	
Ep.	Broadcast date	Nationwide	Metropolitan
1	June 28, 2024	6.887% (1st)	7.877% (1st)
2	July 5, 2024	8.141% (1st)	8.433% (1st)
3	July 12, 2024	9.059% (1st)	9.837% (1st)
4	July 19, 2024	8.176% (1st)	8.954% (1st)
5	July 26, 2024	9.211% (1st)	9.787% (1st)
6	August 2, 2024	7.711% (1st)	8.555% (1st)
7	August 9, 2024	8.173% (1st)	8.980% (1st)
8	August 16, 2024	7.679% (1st)	8.915% (1st)
9	August 23, 2024	6.852% (1st)	7.869% (1st)
10	August 30, 2024	7.434% (1st)	8.445% (1st)
11	September 6, 2024	6.484% (1st)	6.948% (1st)
Average		7.806%	8.604%

=== Awards and nominations ===
Year	Organization	Category	Result	Ref.
2023	TVING Awards	Content of the Year – Best 9	Won	
2023	TVING Awards	Healing of the Year	Won	
2024	Asia Contents Awards & Global OTT Awards	Best Reality & Variety	Won	

== Spin-off ==
In the continuation of season 1, the same cast returned for a two-episode special titled Jinny's Kitchen: Team Building (also known as Visiting God of Communication: Jinny's Kitchen). The episodes premiered on tvN in Korea on October 12 and 19, 2023, respectively, and on Amazon Prime internationally on November 12. Following an anonymous complaint, Producer Na, the God of Communication, organizes a retreat to improve teamwork and communication through various games. The first episode consists of a competition between the executives and interns, while in the second episode both sides play as a unified team.
