= A Witch's Love =

2014 South Korean television series

- Promotional poster
- Genre: Romance, Comedy
- Based on: My Queen by Ching-Chen Lin
- Written by: Lee Sun-jung; Ban Ki-ri
- Directed by: Lee Jung-hyo
- Starring: Uhm Jung-hwa; Park Seo-joon
- Country of origin: South Korea
- Original language: Korean
- No. of episodes: 16

Production
- Production location: Korea
- Production company: Group 8

Original release
- Network: tvN
- Release: April 14 – June 10, 2014

A Witch's Love (Korean: 마녀의 연애; RR: Manyeoui yeonae; lit. 'Witch's Romance') is a 2014 South Korean television series starring Uhm Jung-hwa and Park Seo-joon. It aired on cable channel tvN from April 14 to June 10, 2014, every Monday and Tuesday at 21:40 (KST) for 16 episodes.

The romantic comedy series is a remake of the hit 2009 Taiwanese drama My Queen.

== Synopsis ==
Sparks fly when Ji-yeon (Uhm Jung-hwa) and Dong-ha (Park Seo-joon) meet, and despite the age difference, they find a lot in common with each other, including their scarred hearts.

== Cast ==
=== Main ===
- Uhm Jung-hwa as Ban Ji-yeon

A 39-year-old investigative news reporter at Trouble Maker. Her job is the most important thing in Ji-yeon's life, and she's so passionate about it that colleagues call her a "witch" behind her back. Ji-yeon focuses all her energy on work because she stopped believing in love after her last boyfriend, 41-year-old war photographer Noh Shi-hoon (Han Jae-suk) disappeared prior to their wedding day.

- Park Seo-joon as Yoon Dong-ha

A 25-year-old guy who runs a small errand center with his friend. Their store will do pretty much anything for a customer from dressing as Santa Claus to providing security for an idol star. Dong-ha seems happy-go-lucky, but he hides a secret sorrow, having lost his girlfriend to a fatal heart problem. Since her death, he's lost all his ambition and drive, with his career plans sidelined.

=== Supporting ===
- Yang Hee-kyung as Choi Jung-sook, Ji-yeon's mother
- Ra Mi-ran as Baek Na-rae, Ji-yeon's friend
- Lee Se-chang as Kang Min-gu, Na-rae's husband
- Yoon Hyun-min as Yong Soo-cheol, Dong-ha's friend
- Han Jae-suk as Noh Shi-hoon, photographer
- Sa Hee as Hong Chae-hee, Shi-hoon's assistant
- Bang Eun-hee as Oh Mi-yeon, Eun-chae's mother
- Joo Jin-mo as Kwon Hyun-seob, publisher and Ji-yeon's boss
- Kang Sung-jin as Byun Seok-ki
- Yoon Joon-sung as Song Young-shik
- Shin Soo-hang as Nam Chang-min
- Lee Seul-bi as Oh Rin-ji
- Heo Do-young as Jae-woong
- Jung Yeon-joo as Jung Eun-chae
- Moo Jin-sung as Jin Woo

=== Special appearances ===
- Jeon No-min as Kim Jeong-do (ep. 1–2)
- Lee Eung-kyung as Baek Soo-jeong (ep. 1–2)
- Sung Ji-ru as security guard (ep. 1–2)
- Narsha as mudang (ep. 1–2)
- Ryu Dam as MC (ep. 1–2)
- Choi Jung-hwa as curator
- Lee Jae-yoon as Ji-yeon's blind date (ep. 4)
- Noh Soo-ram as Hyun-ji
- Kim Yul-ho as Dong-ha's senior colleague
- Yeo Eui-joo as Jin-woo, Eun-chae's friend
- Jin Ye-sol as Jung Young-chae
- Lee Guk-joo as misunderstanding woman
- Kim Yeo-woon as that woman's boyfriend
- Jo Sun-mook as Yoon Se-joon
- Lee Jin-ho
- Kwon Young-min
- Han Yeon-soo
- Park Young-soo
- Yoon In-jo
- Lee Moo-saeng as Detective Lee (ep.10 & 13)

== Original soundtrack ==
No.	Title	Artist	Length
1.	"마녀의 연hi" (Witch's Romance)	이크거북
2.	"마녀의 일기" (A Witch's Diary)	Spica
3.	"미안해" (I'm Sorry)	Jung Joon-il
4.	"내 맘에 들어와" (Come into My Heart)	Park Seo-joon
5.	"안녕" (Hello)	Joo Hee (8Eight)
6.	"Witch Comic"	이크거북
7.	"마녀의 일기 (Inst.)" (A Witch's Diary (Inst.))	Various Artists
8.	"미안해 (Inst.)" (I'm Sorry (Inst.))	Various Artists
9.	"내 맘에 들어와 (Inst.)" (Come into My Heart (Inst.))	Various Artists
10.	"안녕 (Inst.)" (Hello (Inst.))	Various Artists
11.	"내게 그대는" (To Me You Are)	이크거북

== Awards and nominations ==
Year	Award	Category	Recipient	Result
2016	tvN10 Awards	Romantic-Comedy King	Park Seo-joon	Nominated
