= Freeze (TV series) =

- Promotional poster
- Genre: Drama, Horror, Romance
- Written by: Ha Seon-jae; Lee Jin-woo
- Directed by: Jung Jae-hoon
- Starring: Lee Seo-jin; Park Han-byul; Son Tae-young
- Composer: Kim Yong-hwi
- Country of origin: South Korea
- Original language: Korean
- No. of episodes: 5

Production
- Producer: Ahn Sang-hoon
- Production location: Korea
- Running time: 60 minutes Friday to Tuesday at 24:00 (KST)
- Production company: Yellow Film

Original release
- Network: CJ CGV
- Release: October 27 – October 31, 2006

Freeze (Korean: 프리즈) is a 2006 South Korean miniseries starring Lee Seo-jin, Park Han-byul and Son Tae-young. It aired on Channel CGV from October 27 to October 31, 2006 for 5 episodes.

== Plot ==
Baek Joong-won once saved the vampire Ehwa from being burned at the stake by his fellow villagers. While attempting to escape together, Joong-won fell off a cliff, and Ehwa gave him her blood to save him from dying. Thus, Joong-won was also transformed into a vampire.

In modern-day Seoul, the 350-year-old Joong-won runs a luxurious wine bar in Gangnam District with Ehwa. Though she holds a torch for him, Ehwa can only observe and protect her friend from afar, as he has long closed himself to any new emotion. One day, Joong-won receives a letter from a former lover, a human he had broken up with 20 years ago without telling her the truth about himself. In her letter, the dying woman asks Joong-won to look after her daughter, Ji-woo.

After her mother's funeral, Ji-woo finds a photograph her mother treasured very much, and she searches for the man in the photo, her mother's long-lost lover. When she finds Joong-won, she assumes that he is the son of the man in the photo. As Joong-won spends time with Ji-woo, all his emotions which were frozen by time start to melt away, and the two fall in love. Ehwa has difficulty dealing with this turn of events. Meanwhile, a serial killer who sucks blood from his or her victims is on the loose.

== Cast ==
- Lee Seo-jin as Baek Joong-won
- Park Han-byul as Ji-woo
- Son Tae-young as Ehwa
- Lee In (Note: Credited as Lee Joon.)
- Lee Han-wi as Park Hyung-joon
- Ji Dae-han
- Kim Kwang-kyu as Inspector Jang (cameo)
- Eun Joo-hee

== Original soundtrack ==
1. 인연 Lover
2. Just Another Daybreak 350년을 기다려온 고독 350 Years Waiting in Solitude
3. Sad Secret (중원의 비밀) (Joong-won's Secret)
4. Never Cry
5. 그대도... 나처럼 You Also... Like Me (Instrumental)
6. Forget Me Not - Waltz for Ji-woo (Piano Solo)
7. 꿈꾸는 소녀 A Girl Who Dreams
8. Russian Roulette (Tango for Ehwa)
9. 그대도... 나처럼 You Also... Like Me (Vocal version)
10. Forget Me Not - Waltz for Ji-woo (Clarinet & String version)
11. I'll Make You Cry Baby - V's in the House
12. Bye...Memories of Mom
13. Point of No Return (End Theme)

== See also ==
- Vampire film
- List of vampire television series
