= Dr. Park's Clinic =

2022 South Korean television series

- Promotional poster
- Hangul: 내과 박원장
- Hanja: 內科 朴院長
- Lit.: Internal Medicine Park Won-jang
- RR: Naegwa Bak Wonjang
- MR: Naekwa Pak Wŏnjang
- Genre: Comedy; Medical drama
- Based on: Internal Medicine Park Won-jang by Jang Bong-soo
- Written by: Seo Jun-beom
- Directed by: Seo Jun-beom
- Starring: Lee Seo-jin; Ra Mi-ran
- Music by: Jung Gi-hoon
- Country of origin: South Korea
- Original language: Korean
- No. of episodes: 12

Production
- Executive producer: Lee Jin-wook
- Producers: Handae Rhee; Seo Jun-beom
- Running time: 30 minutes
- Production companies: Sidus Pictures; XL Pictures

Original release
- Network: TVING
- Release: January 14 – February 18, 2022
- Network: tvN
- Release: May 16 – May 31, 2022

Dr. Park's Clinic (Korean: 내과 박원장) is a South Korean streaming television series directed by Seo Jun-beom and starring Lee Seo-jin and Ra Mi-ran. It premiered on TVING on January 14, 2022.

== Synopsis ==
A medical comedy about Dr. Park Won-jang, a new doctor who struggles with the demands of his vocation.

== Cast ==
=== Main ===
- Lee Seo-jin as Dr. Park Won-jang

Director of a new medicine clinic, which is struggling in terms of patient visits. Due to constant pressure from his clinic's low visitor, piling up debt and family lifestyle, he starts losing hair, therefore has to wear a wig most of the time.

- Ra Mi-ran as Sa Mo-rim

Park Won-jang's wife, who gently wraps her husband's shoulder. She tries to understand her husband's financial situation however, she kept spending her husband's money with her lifestyle that is mainly influenced by TV shows.

=== Supporting ===
- Cha Chung-hwa as Cha Mi-young

The head nurse at Park Won-jang's medicine clinic.

- Shin Eun-jung as Sunwoo Soo-ji

The director of an anal surgery with an innocent appearance and rough speech.

- Kim Kwang-kyu as Ji Min-ji

An obstetrician and gynecologist who is a lover of mixed coffee.

- Jung Hyung-suk as Choi Hyung-suk

The director of the urology department.

- Seo Bum-june as Cha Ji-hoon

Son of Cha Mi-young and a new nurse who works undercover at Park Won-jang's medicine clinic.

- Joo Woo-yeon as Park Min-gu

Park Won-jang's gluttonous first son who has physical strength stronger than human being.

- Han Da-sol as Yoon-ji

Cha Ji-hoon's girlfriend.

- Kim Kang-hoon as Park Dong-gu

Park Won-jang's second son and a young YouTuber.

=== Special appearances ===
- Park Sung-woong

An uber rich, successful doctor and clinic director. His clinic has never been low of visitors.

- Yoo Byung-jae

== Viewership ==
Dr. Park's Clinic : South Korea viewers per episode (thousands)

Season	Episode number						Average
Season	1	2	3	4	5	6	Average
1	584	625	584	476	368	483	TBD

Source: Audience measurement performed nationwide by Nielsen Korea.

Average TV viewership ratings
EP	Original broadcast date	Average audience share (Nielsen Korea)	
EP	Original broadcast date	Nationwide	Seoul
1	May 16, 2022	2.406% (1st)	2.286% (1st)
2	May 17, 2022	2.812% (2nd)	3.071% (1st)
3	May 23, 2022	2.574% (2nd)	2.673% (2nd)
4	May 24, 2022	2.407% (2nd)	2.595% (2nd)
5	May 30, 2022	1.476% (5th)	—N/a
6	May 31, 2022	2.097% (2nd)	2.002% (2nd)
Average		2.295%	— (Note: Due to some ratings not recorded, the exact average rating is unknown.)
In the table above, the blue numbers represent the lowest ratings and the red numbers represent the highest ratings.; This television series airs on a cable channel/pay TV which normally has a relatively smaller audience compared to free-to-air TV/public broadcasters (KBS, SBS, MBC and EBS).
