= Youn's Kitchen =

South Korean reality television show

- Promotional poster for Season 1
- Also known as: Yoon's Restaurant
- Genre: Cooking show Reality show
- Written by: Lee Woo-jung
- Directed by: Na Young-seok; Lee Jin-joo
- Starring: See list
- Country of origin: South Korea
- Original language: Korean
- No. of seasons: 2
- No. of episodes: 20

Production
- Production locations: Season 1 (Gili Trawangan, Indonesia); Season 2 (Garachico, Spain)
- Running time: 100 minutes
- Production companies: CJ E&M

Original release
- Network: tvN
- Release: March 24, 2017 – March 23, 2018

Related
- Youn's Stay; Jinny's Kitchen; Jinny's Kitchen: Team Building

Youn's Kitchen (Korean: 윤식당; RR: Yun sikdang) is a South Korean television reality show that aired on tvN on Fridays nights from March 24, 2017, to March 23, 2018, for a total of twenty episodes.

== Cast ==
=== Season 1 ===
Name	Episode	Notes
Youn Yuh-jung	1 – 9	
Shin Goo	2 – 9	
Lee Seo-jin	1 – 9	
Jung Yu-mi	1 – 9	

=== Season 2 ===
Name	Episode	Notes
Youn Yuh-jung	1 – 11	
Lee Seo-jin	1 – 11	
Jung Yu-mi	1 – 11	
Park Seo-joon	1 – 11	

== Main dish ==
=== Season 1 ===
Youn's main ingredient was bulgogi, which was available in three dishes: Bulgogi Rice, Bulgogi Noodles and Bulgogi Burger. Prior to filming, Youn met with Lee Won-il and Hong Seok-cheon to ask for advice, and received expertise on how to operate Youn's Kitchen, including menu development and restaurant management. From the 4th episode, new items were added to the menu, such as fried dumplings and buns, egg rolls, dumplings, and ramyeon. From the 5th episode, chicken was added.

=== Season 2 ===
The main dish of Youn's Restaurant was bibimbap, and there were initially three varieties: bulgogi bibimbap, spicy pork bibimbap, and vegetable bibimbap. For this season, Youn again met chef Lee Won-il and Hong Seok-cheon for advice and received further know-how on restaurant operations. Kimchi was also on the initial menu. From the 2nd episode, a traditional noodle dish called japchae was added. From the 3rd episode, the spicy pork bibimbap was removed and Korean fried chicken was added. From the 4th episode, ribs were added. From the 6th episode, kimchi fried rice was added.

== Viewership and ratings ==
=== Viewership ===
Youn's Kitchen : South Korea viewers per episode (millions)

Season	Episode number											Average
Season	1	2	3	4	5	6	7	8	9	10	11	Average
2	3.560	3.674	3.518	3.998	4.127	3.171	1.974	3.156	3.056	3.226	2.416	3.261

Source: Audience measurement performed nationwide by Nielsen Media Research.

=== Ratings ===
- In the tables below, blue marks the lowest ratings in each season and red marks the highest ratings.
- This show airs on a cable channel/pay TV which normally has a relatively smaller audience compared to free-to-air TV/public broadcasters (KBS, SBS, MBC & EBS).

==== Season 1 ====
Ep.	Broadcast date	AGB Nielsen		TNmS
Ep.	Broadcast date	Nationwide	Metropolitan	Nationwide
1	March 24, 2017	6.215%	6.785%	7.2%
2	March 31, 2017	9.554%	10.957%	9.0%
3	April 7, 2017	11.298%	12.454%	12.3%
4	April 14, 2017	11.191%	11.837%	11.9%
5	April 21, 2017	13.278%	14.348%	12.0%
6	April 28, 2017	14.141%	16.376%	13.5%
7	May 5, 2017	13.820%	15.168%	12.5%
8	May 12, 2017	11.600%	13.401%	13.0%
9	May 19, 2017	9.032%	10.811%	7.8%
Average		11.125%	12.460%	11.0%

==== Season 2 ====
Promotional poster for Season 2

Ep.	Broadcast date	AGB Nielsen		TNmS
Ep.	Broadcast date	Nationwide	Metropolitan	Nationwide
1	January 5, 2018	14.074%	16.389%	13.7%
2	January 12, 2018	14.840%	17.208%	14.9%
3	January 19, 2018	14.440%	16.574%	15.2%
4	January 26, 2018	15.249%	16.886%	15.1%
5	February 2, 2018	15.986%	18.701%	14.7%
6	February 9, 2018	13.104%	14.908%	12.4%
7	February 23, 2018	8.477%	10.019%	7.4%
8	March 2, 2018	13.583%	16.197%	12.3%
9	March 9, 2018	12.816%	15.503%	11.7%
10	March 16, 2018	13.371%	15.563%	12.4%
11	March 23, 2018	10.695%	11.975%	9.9%
Average		13.330%	15.448%	12.7%

== Franchise ==
Youn's Kitchen has produced three spin-offs: Youn's Stay (2021), Jinny's Kitchen (2023–), Jinny's Kitchen: Team Building (2023).

While the first spin-off is a result of an unanticipated change of format due to the COVID-19 pandemic, all spin-offs starting from Jinny's Kitchen have been developed with the goal of forming a franchise.

=== Youn's Stay ===
While the initial plan was to produce the third season of Youn's Kitchen, the cast and crew weren't able to travel abroad due to the COVID-19 pandemic restrictions and shutdown in 2020. Instead of opening a small Korean restaurant overseas, the production choose to open a traditional hanok guest house in South Jeolla Province in Korea to share part of the Korean culture to the guests who were mainly foreigners.

In December 2020, the new season is renamed "Youn's Stay" to reflect the change of format. The show premiered on tvN on January 8, 2021.

The reality TV show stars original Youn's Kitchen cast members Youn Yuh-jung as the owner and CEO, Lee Seo-jin as the Vice President, Jung Yu-mi and Park Seo-joon as managers. Actor Choi Woo-shik also joined as the new intern of the hotel. He starred in Summer Vacation alongside Jung Yu-mi earlier in the year and is known for the highly awarded movie Parasite in which actor Park Seo-joon also played.

=== Jinny's Kitchen ===
Early 2023, a second spin-off series is announced. The original cast of Youn's Stay-minus Youn Yuh-jung-is back, with Lee Seo-jin as the new owner whose philosophy is all about revenue.

Singer V of BTS joined the cast in season 1 and is replaced by actress Go Min-si for season 2.

=== International adaptation ===
Taiwan became the first country to adapt the show outside South Korea. Titled Ai's Kitchen, the cast include Sylvia Chang as the owner, Tony Yang as the manager, Alice Ko as co-chef, and Darren Wang as the bartender. (G)I-dle's Shuhua and Austin Lin also joined the cast. The show was filmed in Koh Samui, Thailand and premiered on SET Metro on October 5, 2024.

== Awards and nominations ==
Year	Award	Category	Nominated work	Result	Ref.
2018	54th Baeksang Arts Awards	Best Entertainment Program	Youn's Kitchen 2	Nominated	
