= Dream (2023 film) =

2023 South Korean film by Lee Byeong-heon

- Theatrical release poster
- Hangul: 드림
- RR: Deurim
- MR: Tŭrim
- Directed by: Lee Byeong-heon
- Written by: Lee Byeong-heon
- Produced by: Kim Chang-yeol
- Starring: Park Seo-joon; IU; Kim Jong-soo; Ko Chang-seok; Jung Seung-gil; Lee Hyun-woo; Yang Hyun-min; Hong Ahn-pyo; Heo Joon-seok
- Cinematography: Noh Seung-bo
- Edited by: Nam Na-yeong
- Music by: Kim Tae-seong
- Production company: Oktober Cinema Co. Ltd.
- Distributed by: Megabox Plus M
- Release date: April 26, 2023
- Running time: 125 minutes
- Country: South Korea
- Language: Korean
- Box office: US$8.3 million

Dream (Korean: 드림) is a 2023 South Korean sports comedy-drama film written and directed by Lee Byeong-heon, starring Park Seo-joon and IU. It revolves around Yoon Hong-dae, a football player, who receives disciplinary provision and is given the challenging job of coaching the national football team of homeless people for the Homeless World Cup. It was released theatrically on April 26, 2023.

== Synopsis ==
After football player Hong-dae (Park Seo-joon) is involved in an unexpected incident and receives disciplinary probation, he is appointed the coach for a special national soccer team. The team consists of homeless people, some of whom have never even handled a ball before, or they exhibit eccentric and challenging behaviour. They aim to compete in the international Homeless World Cup.

Hong-dae is skeptical and cranky, but slowly warms to the role of coach, also becoming something of a TV star thanks to a documentary simultaneously being filmed about him and the team by videographer Lee So-min (Lee Ji-eun), whose career was also flagging. Hong-dae received a tempting offer that would mean leaving his coaching role, but he sticks with it and rejoins the team for the competition.

The movie is based on a true event, believed to be the 2010 Homeless World Cup, and the team flies to Europe. Although the team does not win the Cup, their performance in their final matches captures the hearts of the spectators and the documentary audience. The careers of Lee So-min and Hong-dae are rehabilitated back in Korea, and Hong-dae is seen re-entering major league soccer in the final sequence.

== Cast ==
- Park Seo-joon as Yoon Hong-dae, a football coach.
- IU as Lee So-min, an aspiring director
- Kim Jong-soo as Kim Hwan-dong
- Ko Chang-seok as Jeon Hyo-bong
- Jung Seung-gil as Son Beom-soo
- Lee Hyun-woo as Kim In-sun
- Yang Hyun-min as Jeon Moon-soo
- Hong Ahn-pyo as Young-jin
- Heo Joon-seok as Hwang In-guk, the secretary general of the club
- Lee Ha-nui as Byeong-sam
- Han Joon-woo as Enterprise Staff 2
- Lee Ji-hyun as Jin-ju
- Baek Ji-won as Sun-ja, Hong-dae's mother
- Jung Soon-won
- Park Hyung-soo as Representative Kim
- Yoon Ji-on as Entertainment company staff
- Cho Woo-jong as a caster
- Park Moon-sung as a football commentator
- Kang Ha-neul as Sung-chan
- Park Myung-hoon as a reporter
- Jo Hyang-gi as MC

== Production ==
=== Casting ===
In January 2020, Park Seo-joon was cast to play Yoon Hong-dae, a football player-turned-coach. In January 2020, IU was confirmed to star alongside Park. Park prepared for his role by going to the gym.

=== Filming ===
Principal photography began on May 7, 2020. In October 2020, the production team wrapped up filming in South Korea. Additional scenes were scheduled to be filmed in Hungary or Colombia, depending on the COVID-19 situation. Foreign locale shooting of the film were then postponed to 2022 due to post COVID-19 complications and working schedule of actors.

On February 8, 2022, it was reported that the actors and staff of Dream would start filming overseas in Europe in March. Later, director Lee Byung-hun flew to Europe and toured the filming location. On March 3, 2022, it was reported that Park Seo-joon flew to Hungary for the shooting of the film.

Filming wrapped on April 13, 2022, in Hungary. Commenting on post-production work, director Lee Byung-hun said, "I will do my best to complete the rest of the post-production work so that the feelings we wanted to convey through this film can be conveyed to the audience."

== Release ==
The film was released theatrically on April 26, 2023. It made its international premiere as Centerpiece Presentation at the 22nd New York Asian Film Festival on July 17, 2023.

=== Home media ===
The film was made available for streaming on IPTV (KT olleh TV, SK Btv, LG U+ TV), Home Choice, Google Play, Apple TV, TVING, WAVVE, Naver TV, KT skylife, and Coupang Play from June 14, 2023 in South Korea and globally via Netflix from July 25, 2023.

== Reception ==
=== Box office ===
The film was released on April 26, 2023 on 1229 screens. It opened at 1st place on the South Korean box office with 93,417 people viewing the film. It was placed at 2nd place on first weekend of its release with 138,859 admissions. The film surpassed 1 million cumulative viewers on 16th day of its release.

As of December 31, 2023, with gross of US$8,222,678 and 1,128,375 admissions, it is the twelfth highest-grossing Korean film of 2023.

=== Critical response ===
On the review aggregator Rotten Tomatoes website, the film has an approval rating of 38% based on 8 reviews, with an average rating of 6/10. Viewers found the film rushed, predictable, lengthy at 125m, and only passable, with its many 'feelgood' scenes.
