= Park Seo-joon =

South Korean actor (born 1988)

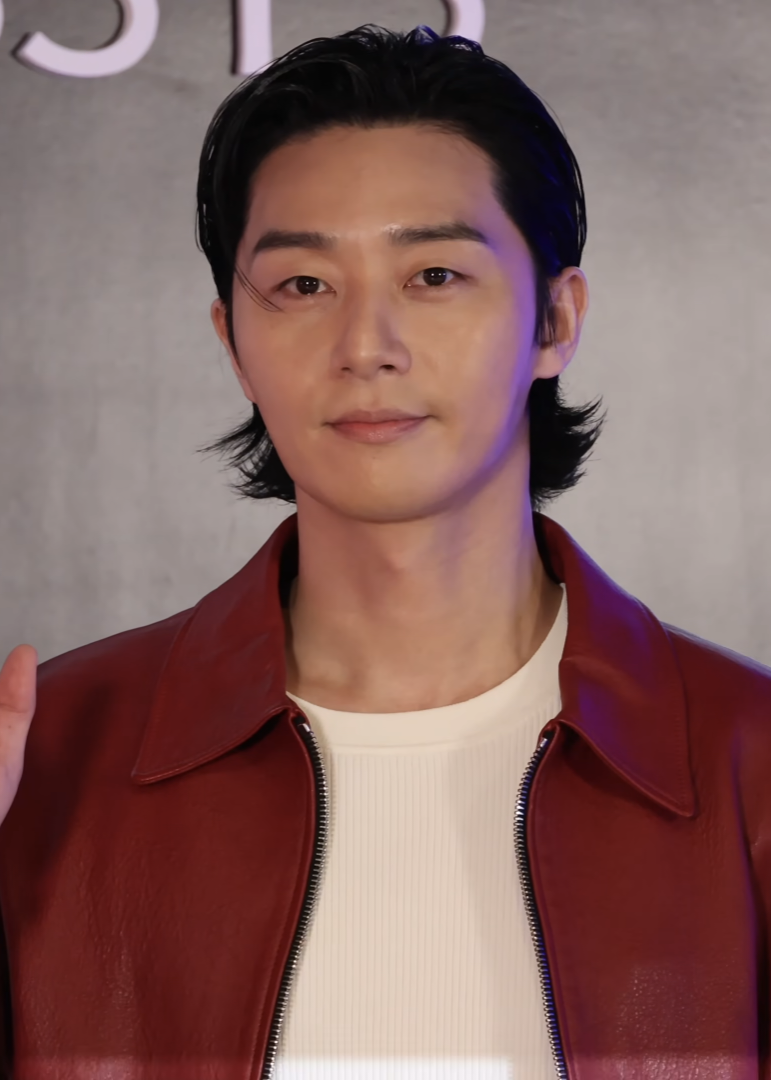
- Park in 2026
- Born: Park Yong-kyu; December 16, 1988 (age 37); Seoul, South Korea
- Education: Seoul Institute of the Arts
- Occupation: Actor
- Years active: 2011–present
- Agent: Awesome ENT

Korean name
- Hangul: 박용규
- RR: Bak Yonggyu
- MR: Pak Yonggyu

Stage name
- Hangul: 박서준
- Hanja: 朴敘俊
- RR: Bak Seojun
- MR: Pak Sŏjun
- Website: awesomeent.co.kr

Signature
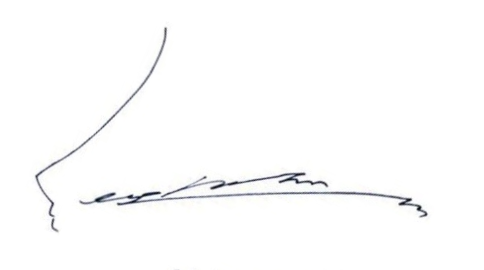

Park Yong-kyu (Korean: 박용규; born December 16, 1988), better known by the stage name Park Seo-jun (박서준), is a South Korean actor. He first gained wide recognition for starring in the television series Fight for My Way (2017) and What's Wrong with Secretary Kim (2018), gaining further prominence with dramas Itaewon Class (2020) and Gyeongseong Creature (2023–2024). He also starred in films The Chronicles of Evil (2015) and Midnight Runners (2017), and made his Hollywood debut with superhero film The Marvels in 2023.

== Early years and education ==
During his middle school years, Park Seo-joon happened to join an animation club by chance. Through this club, he had the opportunity to participate in an annual performance stage. He gained a lot of experience from being the center of attention, which led him to pursue his studies in the Acting Department at Seoul Institute of the Arts.

While pursuing his studies in acting, Park encountered challenges and became overwhelmed by the constant presence of others. In 2008, he chose to enlist in the military, seeing it as an opportunity to gather his thoughts and organize his life. As such, Park believed that fulfilling his military service obligation should be his first priority. He was assigned to the Security Guard Battalion and completed his active military service at the Cheongju Correctional Facility.

== Career ==
=== 2011–2015: Beginnings and breakthrough ===
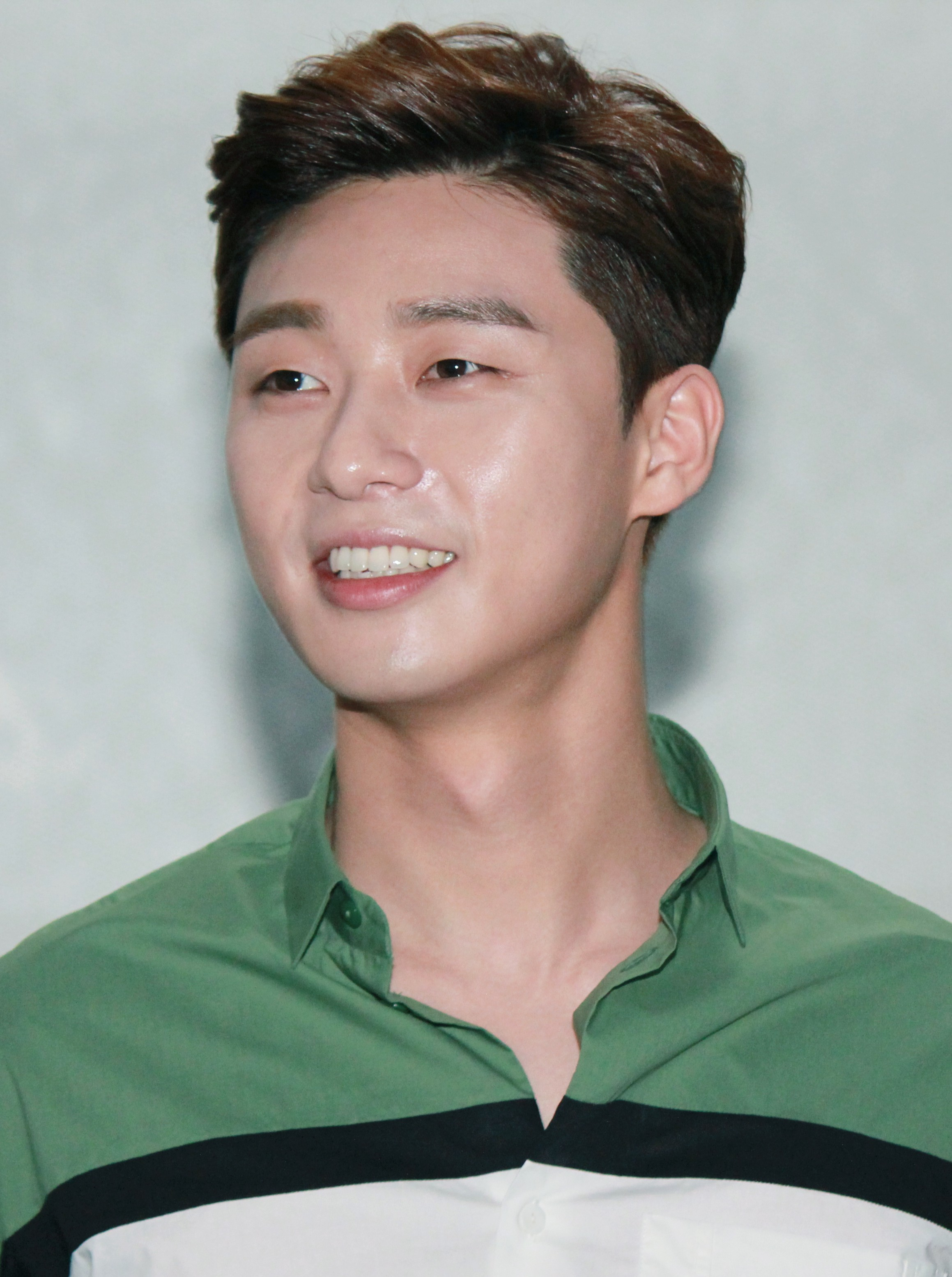
At The Chronicles of Evil stage greeting in Busan, 2015

Park made his entertainment debut in 2011 by appearing in the music video of Bang Yong-guk's single "I Remember." He played supporting roles in television dramas Dream High 2 (2012), Pots of Gold (2013), and One Warm Word (2013), and had his first leading role in A Witch's Love (2014). From October 2013 to April 2015, he hosted Music Bank.

His breakout roles came in 2015 with the dramas Kill Me, Heal Me and She Was Pretty, where he starred alongside Hwang Jung-eum. The same year, Park featured in the thriller film The Chronicles of Evil.

=== 2016–present: Mainstream popularity ===
In 2016, Park starred in the youth historical drama Hwarang: The Poet Warrior Youth alongside Go Ara and Park Hyung-sik, playing a young man of low birth, who becomes a legendary Hwarang warrior in the Silla period.

Park found success in the 2017 KBS2 romance comedy drama, Fight for My Way, where he played Ko Dong-man, a former taekwondo player with a painful past, who struggles to find his success as a mixed martial arts fighter, alongside Kim Ji-won. The television series was a major hit in South Korea and topped ratings in its time slot. The same year, he played his first big-screen leading role in the action-comedy Midnight Runners with Kang Ha-neul. Park won the Best New Actor award at major film award ceremonies such as the Grand Bell Awards and the Korean Association of Film Critics Awards. In 2018, Park starred in the romantic comedy drama What's Wrong with Secretary Kim, playing a narcissistic vice-chairman of a major corporation who falls in love with his secretary, played by Park Min-young. The series was a hit and Park received positive reviews from critics for his performance, being dubbed the "master of romantic comedy" by the Korean press.

In 2019, Park starred in the action horror film The Divine Fury in the role of a martial arts champion with divine powers. The same year, Park served as the special juror for the Asiana International Short Film Festival. He also made a guest appearance in the Oscar-winning movie Parasite (2019). In 2020, Park starred in JTBC drama Itaewon Class, based on the webtoon of the same name. He played an owner of a bar-restaurant who successfully expands it into a franchise. The drama was a success, and was praised for its interesting story development and colorful performances. For his role, Park was nominated for Best Actor - Television at 56th Baeksang Arts Awards In 2023, he starred in the sports film Dream as a soccer player turned coach named Yoon Hong-Dae, directed by Lee Byeong-heon, and disaster-thriller film Concrete Utopia directed by Um Tae-hwa. He made his Hollywood debut, appearing in the MCU film The Marvels as Prince Yan of Aladna.

Park starred in the romance drama series Surely Tomorrow opposite Won Ji-an which premiered in JTBC in 2025.

== Philanthropy ==
On February 10, 2023, Park donated ₩100 million to the Hope Bridge National Disaster Relief Association to help victims of the 2023 Turkey–Syria earthquake.

== Filmography ==
Key
†	Denotes films that have not yet been released

=== Film ===
Year	Title	Role	Notes	Ref.
2011	Perfect Game	Chil-goo	Bit part	
2015	The Chronicles of Evil	Cha Dong-jae		
2015	The Beauty Inside	Woo-jin		
2017	Real	Dressed-up bodyguard	Cameo	
2017	Midnight Runners	Park Ki-joon		
2018	Be with You	adult Jung Ji-ho	Cameo	
2019	Parasite	Min-hyuk	Cameo	
2019	The Divine Fury	Yong-hoo		
2023	Dream	Yoon Hong-dae		
2023	Concrete Utopia	Min-sung		
2023	The Marvels	Prince Yan	Hollywood debut	

=== Television series ===
Year	Title	Role	Notes	Ref.
2012	Dream High 2	Lee Si-woo		
2012	Family	Cha Seo-joon		
2013	Pots of Gold	Park Hyun-tae		
2013	Drama Festival: The Sleeping Witch	Kim Him-chan		
2013	One Warm Word	Song Min-soo		
2014	A Witch's Love	Yoon Dong-ha		
2014	Mama	adult Han Geu-roo	Cameo (episode 24)	
2015	Kill Me, Heal Me	Oh Ri-on		
2015	She Was Pretty	Ji Sung-joon		
2016–2017	Hwarang: The Poet Warrior Youth	Moo Myung / Kim Sun-woo		
2017	Fight for My Way	Ko Dong-man		
2018	What's Wrong with Secretary Kim	Lee Young-joon		
2020	Itaewon Class	Park Sae-ro-yi		
2020	Record of Youth	Song Min-soo	Cameo (episode 9–10)	
2023–2024	Gyeongseong Creature	Jang Tae-sang / Ho-jae	Season 1–2	
2025–2026	Surely Tomorrow	Lee Gyeong-do		
2026	Bloodhounds	Choi Sin-hyeong	Cameo (season 2)	
2027	Born Guilty †	Pengi		

=== Television shows ===
Year	Title	Role	Notes	Ref.
2013–2015	Music Bank	Host	with Yoon Bo-ra	
2018	Youn's Kitchen	Cast member	Season 2	
2021	Youn's Stay	Cast member		
2022	In the Soop: Friendcation	Cast member		
2022	Young Actors' Retreat	Cast member		
2023–2024	Jinny's Kitchen	Cast member	2 seasons	
2023	Jinny's Kitchen: Team Building	Cast member		

=== Hosting ===
Year	Title	Notes	Ref.
2014	2014 SBS Drama Awards	with Lee Hwi-jae and Park Shin-hye	

=== Music video appearances ===
Year	Song title	Artist	Ref.
2011	"I Remember"	Bang Yong-guk and Yang Yo-seob	
2014	"One Two Three Four"	The One	
2017	"Dream All Day"	Kim Ji-soo	
2021	"Gyopo Hairstyle"	Peakboy	
2024	"Ice Cream"	Jeon Somi	

== Discography ==
List of singles, showing year released, selected chart positions, and name of the album
Title	Year	Peak chart positions	Album
Title	Year	KOR	Album
"New Dreaming" (with JB)	2012	—	Dream High 2 OST
"Come into My Heart"	2014	—	A Witch's Love OST
"Letting You Go"	2015	91	Kill Me, Heal Me OST
"Long Way"	2015	—	She Was Pretty OST
"Our Tears"	2017	—	Hwarang: The Poet Warrior Youth OST
"—" denotes a recording that did not chart or was not released in that territory

== Accolades ==
=== Awards and nominations ===
Name of the award ceremony, year presented, category, nominee of the award, and the result of the nomination
Award ceremony	Year	Category	Nominee / Work	Result	Ref.
APAN Star Awards	2013	Best New Actor	Pots of Gold	Nominated	
APAN Star Awards	2015	Excellence Award, Actor in a Miniseries	Kill Me, Heal Me, She Was Pretty	Nominated	
APAN Star Awards	2018	Top Excellence Award, Actor in a Miniseries	What's Wrong with Secretary Kim	Won	
APAN Star Awards	2021	Grand Prize (Daesang)	Itaewon Class	Nominated	
APAN Star Awards	2021	Popular Star Award, Actor	Itaewon Class	Nominated	
Asia Artist Awards	2017	Fabulous Award	Fight for My Way	Won	
Asia Artist Awards	2017	Best Star Award	Fight for My Way	Won	
Asian Film Awards	2019	AFA Rising Star Award	Park Seo-joon	Won	
Baeksang Arts Awards	2014	Best New Actor – Television	One Warm Word	Nominated	
Baeksang Arts Awards	2016	Best New Actor – Film	The Chronicles of Evil	Nominated	
Baeksang Arts Awards	2018	Best Actor – Television	Fight for My Way	Nominated	
Baeksang Arts Awards	2020	Best Actor – Television	Itaewon Class	Nominated	
Blue Dragon Film Awards	2015	Best New Actor	The Chronicles of Evil	Nominated	
Blue Dragon Film Awards	2015	Popular Star Award	The Chronicles of Evil	Won	
Brand Customer Loyalty Awards	2020	Most Influential Male Actor – Trend Icon	Park Seo-joon	Won	
Buil Film Awards	2017	Best New Actor	Midnight Runners	Nominated	
Chunsa Film Art Awards	2016	Best New Actor	The Chronicles of Evil	Nominated	
Chunsa Film Art Awards	2018	Best New Actor	Midnight Runners	Nominated	
Cosmo Beauty Awards	2018	Annual Shining Beauty Idol	Park Seo-joon	Won	
Fashionista Awards	2015	Best Fashion in TV	She Was Pretty	Won	
Grand Bell Awards	2015	Best New Actor	The Chronicles of Evil	Nominated	
Grand Bell Awards	2017	Best New Actor	Midnight Runners	Won	
Herald Donga Lifestyle Awards	2014	Best Style of the Year	Park Seo-joon	Won	
KBS Drama Awards	2017	Top Excellence Award, Actor	Fight for My Way, Hwarang: The Poet Warrior Youth	Nominated	
KBS Drama Awards	2017	Excellence Award, Actor in a Mid-length Drama	Hwarang: The Poet Warrior Youth	Nominated	
KBS Drama Awards	2017	Excellence Award, Actor in a Miniseries	Fight for My Way	Won	
KBS Drama Awards	2017	Netizen Award, Actor	Fight for My Way	Won	
KBS Drama Awards	2017	Best Couple Award	Park Seo-joon with Kim Ji-won; Fight for My Way	Won	
KBS World Global Fan Awards	2018	Best Couple Award	Park Seo-joon with Kim Ji-won; Fight for My Way	Won	
KOFRA Film Awards	2018	Best New Actor	Midnight Runners	Won	
Korea Drama Awards	2013	Best New Actor	Pots of Gold	Won	
Korea Drama Awards	2018	Top Excellence Award, Actor	What's Wrong with Secretary Kim	Nominated	
Korea Film Actors Association Awards	2017	Popular Star Award	Midnight Runners	Won	
Korea Tourism Awards	2018	Special Merit Award	Park Seo-joon	Won	
Korean Association of Film Critics Awards	2017	Best New Actor	Midnight Runners	Won	
Max Movie Awards	2016	Best New Actor	The Chronicles of Evil	Nominated	
MBC Drama Awards	2013	Best New Actor	Pots of Gold	Nominated	
MBC Drama Awards	2015	Excellence Award, Actor in a Miniseries	Kill Me, Heal Me, She Was Pretty	Won	
MBC Drama Awards	2015	Popularity Award, Actor	Kill Me, Heal Me, She Was Pretty	Won	
MBC Drama Awards	2015	Top 10 Stars Award	Kill Me, Heal Me, She Was Pretty	Won	
MBC Drama Awards	2015	Best Couple Award	Park Seo-joon with Ji Sung; Kill Me, Heal Me	Won	
SBS Drama Awards	2014	New Star Award	One Warm Word	Won	
Seoul International Drama Awards	2018	Outstanding Korean Actor	Fight for My Way	Won	
The Seoul Awards	2017	Best New Actor (Film)	Midnight Runners	Nominated	
tvN10 Awards	2016	Romantic-Comedy King	A Witch's Love	Nominated	

=== Listicles ===
Name of publisher, year listed, name of listicle, and placement
Publisher	Year	Listicle	Placement	Ref.
Forbes	2018	Korea Power Celebrity	22nd	
Forbes	2019	Korea Power Celebrity	30th	
Forbes	2021	Korea Power Celebrity	14th	
Forbes	2022	Korea Power Celebrity	12th	
Forbes	2025	Korea Power Celebrity	35th	
