= Youn's Stay =

South Korean reality show

- Promotional poster
- Genre: Reality show
- Written by: Kim Ran-ju
- Directed by: Na Young-seok; Kim Se-hee
- Starring: See list
- Country of origin: South Korea
- Original languages: Korean; English
- No. of seasons: 1
- No. of episodes: 12

Production
- Production locations: Gurye County, South Jeolla Province
- Running time: 100 minutes
- Production company: CJ ENM

Original release
- Network: tvN
- Release: January 8 – April 2, 2021

Related
- Youn's Kitchen; Jinny's Kitchen; Jinny's Kitchen: Team Building

Youn's Stay (Korean: 윤스테이) is a South Korean reality show which premiered on tvN on January 8, 2021, and aired every Friday at 21:10 (KST).

Due to the COVID-19 pandemic situation, many important changes were made to the original format of the reality show "Youn's Kitchen" for the third season, leading the producers to make the decision to release it under the new title "Youn's Stay". It is the first spin-off of Youn's Kitchen.

== Overview ==
The show is a rebrand from Youn's Kitchen, in which the cast members operate a hanok guesthouse, specially for foreigners who have lived in South Korea for less than a year.

== Cast ==
- Youn Yuh-jung as herself (Owner and CEO of Youn's Stay)
- Lee Seo-jin as himself (Vice CEO of Youn's Stay)
- Jung Yu-mi as herself (Manager)
- Park Seo-joon as himself (Manager)
- Choi Woo-shik as himself (Intern)

== Production ==
Since travelling abroad was not possible due to the COVID-19 pandemic, the reality show took place in Korea to run a traditional hanok guest house in South Jeolla Province instead of opening a small Korean restaurant overseas. According to the series producer, Kim Sae-hee, the show's purpose was to show the guests (who were mainly foreigners who have lived in South Korea for less than a year for educational or business matters) part of the culture and "beauty of Korea" that they couldn't see freely due to the pandemic.

Matching the change of format, it is stated in December 2020 that the new season is renamed "Youn's Stay".

=== Casting ===
On April 1, 2020, it is revealed that production had tried to take Youn Yuh-jung, Lee Seo-jin, Jung Yu-mi and Park Seo-joon abroad to film the third season of Youn's Stay but were unable to due to the COVID-19 situation.

On October 26, 2020, the new addition of actor Choi Woo-shik is announced. Choi is known for Our Beloved Summer and the highly awarded movie Parasite in which actor Park Seo-joon also played.

Choi joins as the new intern of the hotel, while Youn stays the owner and CEO. Others are promoted: Lee as Vice President, Jung and Park as managers.

The part-time helper, Shin Gu, does not appear in this show.

=== Filming ===
While the initial plan was to produce a third season for the original program "Youn's Kitchen", the production had to face the COVID-19 pandemic restrictions and shutdown in 2020, leading to major changes in the show format. First, the filming of season 3 which was planned for March 3, 2020 overseas was postponed until the second half of the year, monitoring the global situation.
On October 26, 2020, it is announced that, after considering filming in January 2021, the filming would take place in Korea in the end of November 2020. However, for safety reasons related to the COVID propagation, the location was kept secret. The broadcast was also scheduled for January 2021.

== Viewership ==
Youn's Stay : South Korea viewers per episode (millions)

Season	Episode number												Average
Season	1	2	3	4	5	6	7	8	9	10	11	12	Average
1	2.172	2.654	2.950	2.919	2.849	1.971	1.859	1.753	2.025	1.890	1.797	1.661	2.208

Source: Audience measurement performed nationwide by Nielsen Korea.

Average TV viewership ratings
Ep.	Original broadcast date	Average audience share (Nielsen Korea)	
Ep.	Original broadcast date	Nationwide	Seoul
1	January 8, 2021	8.210%	9.828%
2	January 15, 2021	10.212%	11.699%
3	January 22, 2021	11.486%	13.280%
4	January 29, 2021	11.404%	13.204%
5	February 5, 2021	11.578%	13.339%
6	February 19, 2021	7.852%	9.148%
7	February 26, 2021	7.591%	8.069%
8	March 5, 2021	7.315%	8.556%
9	March 12, 2021	8.272%	9.534%
10	March 19, 2021	7.145%	7.715%
11	March 26, 2021	7.390%	8.591%
12	April 2, 2021	6.613%	7.458%
Average		8.756%	10.035%
In the table above, the blue numbers represent the lowest ratings and the red numbers represent the highest ratings.; This show airs on a cable channel/pay TV which normally has a relatively smaller audience compared to free-to-air TV/public broadcasters (KBS, SBS, MBC & EBS).
