= Lee Seo-jin =

South Korean actor (born 1971)

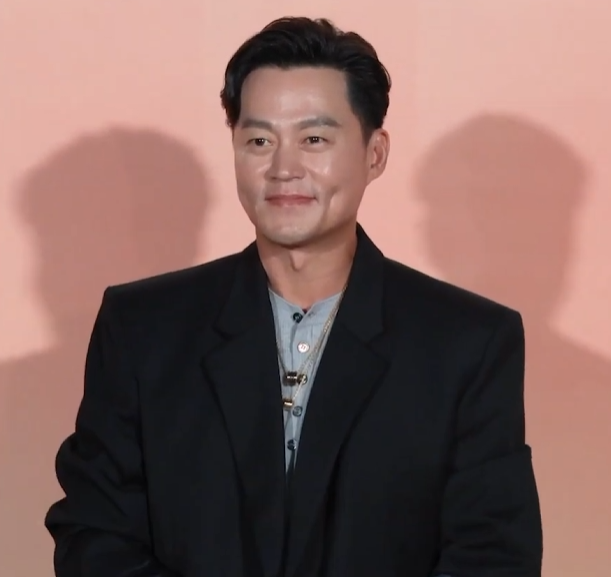
- Lee in September 2024
- Born: January 30, 1971 (age 55); Jung District, Seoul, South Korea
- Other name: Lee Suh-jin
- Education: New York University
- Occupation: Actor
- Years active: 1999–present
- Agent: Antenna

Korean name
- Hangul: 이서진
- RR: I Seojin
- MR: I Sŏjin
- Website: seojinlee.com

Lee Seo-jin (Korean: 이서진; born January 30, 1971) is a South Korean actor. He is best known for the reality shows Three Meals a Day and Grandpa Over Flowers. As an actor, he came to prominence with his leading roles in the television series Damo (2003), Phoenix (2004), Lovers (2006), Yi San (2007) and Marriage Contract (2016).

== Career ==
Lee Seo-jin made his acting debut in 1999 in the television series House Above the Waves. After several supporting roles on TV, he rose to fame in the 2003 hit period drama Damo, followed by another popular contemporary drama Phoenix in 2004. Lee then landed his first big screen leading role in the 2005 action blockbuster Shadowless Sword.

Lee played a vampire in the cable series Freeze (2006), a gangster in Lovers (2006), and a criminal profiler in Soul (2009). He expanded his new audience when he portrayed Korean historical characters King Jeongjo of Joseon in Yi San (2007), and General Gyebaek of Baekje in Gyebaek (2011).

== Other activities ==
Lee comes from a family with strong ties to the financial sector, and was believed to be involved in the banking, transportation and tourism industries, among others. He has a Business Management degree from the New York University Stern School of Business. In 2011, Lee joined the company Ask Veritas Assets Management, which specializes in intellectual property and real estate investment. He was appointed managing director for the firm's second global contents division.

A regular volunteer of Habitat for Humanity since 2006, he was appointed its Goodwill Ambassador for Korea in 2008. Together with the Nippon Foundation and South Korean food franchise Genesis, Lee established the "Let's Tree Fund" in 2010 to conduct reforestation activities. In 2011, Lee joined relief efforts for victims of the Japanese earthquake and tsunami. Like many celebrities, Lee also publicly protested the forced repatriation of North Korean defectors.

== Filmography ==
=== Film ===
Year	Title	Role	Notes	Ref.
2000	Ghost Taxi	Gil-nam		
2001	I Love You	Jin-sung		
2005	Shadowless Sword	Dae Jeong-hyun, the last prince of Balhae		
2006	Freeze	Male		
2009	Hon	Shin-ryu		
2015	Love Forecast	Lee Dong-jin		
2015	The Shameless			
2018	Intimate Strangers	Joon-mo		
2019	Trap: Director's Cut	Kang Woo-hyun		

=== Television series ===
Year	Title	Role	Notes	Ref.
1999	House Above the Waves			
1999	Wang Cho (The Boss)			
2001	Her House	Lee Joon-hee		
2001	New Nonstop		guest	
2001	Sunday Best "A Good Man, Lee Young-woo"		one act-drama	
2002	Since We Met	Kang Min-suk		
2002–2003	Shoot for the Stars	Do-hyun		
2003	Damo	Commander Hwangbo Yoon		
2004	Phoenix	Jang Sae-hoon		
2006	Freeze	Baek Joong-won		
2006–2007	Lovers	Ha Kang-jae		
2007–2008	Lee San, Wind of the Palace	Yi San (King Jeongjo)		
2008	On Air	Himself	cameo, ep 9	
2009	Soul	Shin Ryu		
2011	Gyebaek	Gyebaek		
2014	Wonderful Days	Kang Dong-seok		
2016	Marriage Contract	Han Ji-hoon		
2019	Trap	Kang Woo-hyun		
2021	Times	Lee Jin-woo		
2022	Behind Every Star	Matthew / Tae-oh		

=== Web series ===
Year	Title	Role	Ref.
2014	The Best Future	Choi Kang-ja	
2022	Dr. Park's Clinic	Park Won-jung	
2024	High School Return of a Gangster	Kim Deuk-pal	

=== Television show ===
Year	Title	Role	Ref.
2013–2015	Grandpas Over Flowers	Cast member	
2014–2015	Three Meals a Day	Cast member	
2016	Talents for Sale	Cast member	
2016	Three Meals a Day: Fishing Village 3	Cast member	
2017–2018	Youn's Kitchen	Cast member	
2017	Three Meals a Day: Sea Ranch	Cast member	
2018	Grandpas Over Flowers Returns	Cast member	
2019	Little Forest	Cast member	
2020	Friday Joy Package	Cast member	
2021	Youn's Stay	Cast member and vice-CEO	
2022	Unexpected Journey	Cast member	
2023–2024	Jinny's Kitchen	Cast member and owner of the restaurant	
2023	Jinny's Kitchen: Team Building	Cast member	
2025	My Grumpy Secretary Season 1	Cast member	
2026	Ready or Not: Texas	Cast member	
2026	My Genie Secretary Season 2 (또는 무엇이든 해드립니다) (Note: Prior to its second season premiere on August 28, 2026, the series changed its official English and Korean title from 'My Grumpy Secretary'(내겐 너무 까칠한 매니저) to My Genie Secretary (또는 무엇이든 해드립니다) to reflect an updated production concept.)	Cast member	
2026	Just a Friend (그냥 사람 친구)	Cast member	

=== Music video appearances ===
Year	Title	Artist	Ref.
1999	"Forever"	Sky	
2000	"Lieblich"	Boohwal	
2001	"Goodbye"	Jung Jae-wook	
2004	"Where Are You?"	Yim Jae-beom for Ditto 3 compilation album	

== Stage ==
=== Musical ===
Musical's performance
Year	Title		Role	Theater	Date	Ref.
Year	English	Korean	Role	Theater	Date	Ref.
2000	Shakespeare's Love Method	세익스피어식 사랑메소드	Hamlet	Hoam Art Hall	May 12–14	
2001	Shakespeare's Love Method	세익스피어식 사랑메소드	Hamlet	Daehakro Performing Arts Center Grand Theater	November 17–25	

=== Theater ===
Theater performance
Year	Title		Role	Theater	Date	Ref.
Year	English	Korean	Role	Theater	Date	Ref.
2026	Uncle Vanya	바냐 삼촌	Vanya	LG Signature Hall, LG Arts Center	May 7–31	

== Accolades ==
=== Awards and nominations ===
Name of the award ceremony, year presented, category, nominee of the award, and the result of the nomination
Award ceremony	Year	Category	Nominee / Work	Result	Ref.
APAN Star Awards	2014	Top Excellence Award, Actor in a Serial Drama	Wonderful Days	Nominated	
Baeksang Arts Awards	2008	Best Actor – Television	Yi San	Nominated	
Baeksang Arts Awards	2026	Best Male Variety Performer	Lee Seo-jin	Nominated	
KBS Drama Awards	2014	Excellence Award, Actor in a Serial Drama	Wonderful Days	Nominated	
KBS Drama Awards	2014	Netizen Award, Actor	Wonderful Days	Nominated	
KBS Drama Awards	2014	Best Couple Award with Kim Hee-sun	Wonderful Days	Nominated	
MBC Drama Awards	2001	Best New Actor	Her House	Won	
MBC Drama Awards	2003	Excellence Award, Actor	Damo	Won	
MBC Drama Awards	2003	Popularity Award, Actor	Damo	Nominated	
MBC Drama Awards	2003	Best Couple Award with Ha Ji-won	Damo	Won	
MBC Drama Awards	2004	Top Excellence Award, Actor	Phoenix	Won	
MBC Drama Awards	2004	Popularity Award, Actor	Phoenix	Nominated	
MBC Drama Awards	2004	Best Couple Award with Lee Eun-ju	Phoenix	Won	
MBC Drama Awards	2007	Top Excellence Award, Actor	Yi San	Won	
MBC Drama Awards	2007	Popularity Award, Actor	Yi San	Nominated	
MBC Drama Awards	2007	Best Couple Award with Han Ji-min	Yi San	Nominated	
MBC Drama Awards	2016	Grand Prize (Daesang)	Marriage Contract	Nominated	
MBC Drama Awards	2016	Top Excellence Award, Actor in a Special Project Drama	Marriage Contract	Won	
MBC Drama Awards	2016	Best Couple Award with Uee	Marriage Contract	Nominated	
SBS Drama Awards	2006	Netizen Popularity Award, Actor	Lovers	Won	
SBS Drama Awards	2006	Top 10 Star	Lovers	Won	
SBS Entertainment Awards	2025	Top Excellence Award (Show/Variety)	My Grumpy Secretary	Won	
Style Icon Awards	2013	Style Icon	Lee Seo-jin	Won	
tvN10 Awards	2016	Grand Prize (Daesang), Variety Performer	Three Meals a Day: Jeongseon Village, Grandpas Over Flowers	Won	
tvN10 Awards	2016	Variety Icon	Three Meals a Day: Jeongseon Village	Nominated	

=== State honors ===
Name of country, year given, and name of honor
Country or Organization	Year	Honor or Award	Ref.
National Tax Service (Note: Honors are given at the Taxpayers' Day ceremony.)	2019	Presidential Commendation	

=== Listicles ===
Name of publisher, year listed, name of listicle, and placement
Publisher	Year	Listicle	Placement	Ref.
Forbes	2015	Korea Power Celebrity 40	25th	
Korean Film Council	2021	Korean Actors 200 (Note: Introduces 200 actors that best represent the present and future of Korean cinema to the people in the film industry all over the world.)	Included	
