= Kim Ye-won (actress, born 1997) =

South Korean actress (born 1997)

- Born: August 23, 1997 (age 29); South Korea
- Occupation: Actress
- Agent: Artist Company

Korean name
- Hangul: 김예원
- Hanja: 金艺媛
- RR: Gim Yewon
- MR: Kim Yewŏn

Kim Ye-won (Korean: 김예원; born August 23, 1997) is a South Korean actress.

== Filmography ==
=== Television series ===
Year	Title	Role	Network
2004	Toji, the Land	young Yang-hyeon	SBS
2004	Dal-rae's House	Song-yi (guest, episode 54)	KBS2
2006	Finding Dorothy	Lee Soo-ah	MBC
2006	The Vineyard Man	So Hee-jung	KBS2
2007	Drama City: "Run, Gong-joo"	Na Gong-joo	KBS2
2007	The King and I	young Seol-young	SBS
2007	The Innocent Woman	Oh Sa-rang	KBS2
2008	My Pitiful Sister	young Song In-soo	KBS1
2009	Empress Cheonchu	young Chun Hyang-bi	KBS2
2009	Strike Love	young Choi Hyun-ji	MBC

=== Film ===
Year	Title	Role
2006	Almost Love	
2010	Poetry	Mr. Kang's granddaughter
2011	Funny Neighbors	Yang Sol-mi
2013	Steal My Heart	young Yoon Jin-sook

== Awards and nominations ==
Year	Award	Category	Nominated work	Result
2007	KBS Drama Awards	Best Young Actress	The Innocent Woman	Won
