= Agent Kim Reactivated =

2026 South Korean television series

- Promotional poster
- Also known as: Mr. Kim
- Hangul: 김부장
- Lit.: Manager Kim
- RR: Gim bujang
- MR: Kim pujang
- Genre: Revenge; Action thriller; Comedy
- Based on: Manager Kim by: Jeong Jong-taek; Toy
- Written by: Nam Dae-joong
- Directed by: Yi Seung-young; Lee So-eun
- Starring: So Ji-sub; Choi Dae-hoon; Yoon Kyung-ho; Joo Sang-wook; Son Na-eun; Kim Sung-kyu; Lee Jae-yong; Won Hyun-jun; Park Jin-woo; Jo Bok-rae; Lee Dong-ha; Seo Su-min; Yu Ji-ahn
- Music by: Kim Sung-yul
- Country of origin: South Korea
- Original language: Korean
- No. of episodes: 10

Production
- Executive producers: Hong Sung-chang; Namkoong Jung; Kim Chul-min; Lee Kwang-soon; Kim Bo-ram
- Producers: Yoon Yoon-sun; Kim Deok-jin
- Cinematography: Jo Dae-geun; Han Sang-gyu; Jo Ho-soo
- Editors: Sun Han-saem; Lee Ji-hyun
- Production companies: Studio S; Fantagio

Original release
- Network: SBS TV
- Release: June 26 – July 25, 2026

Agent Kim Reactivated (Korean: 김부장) is a 2026 South Korean revenge drama and action thriller television series written by Nam Dae-joong, and directed by Yi Seung-young and Lee So-eun. It stars So Ji-sub in the titular role as a former black-ops operative alongside an ensemble cast featuring Choi Dae-hoon, Yoon Kyung-ho, Joo Sang-wook, Son Na-eun, Kim Sung-kyu, Lee Jae-yong, Won Hyun-jun, Park Jin-woo, Jo Bok-rae, Lee Dong-ha, Seo Su-min, and Yu Ji-ahn. Based on the Naver Webtoon Manager Kim by Jeong Jong-taek and Toy, the plot centers on Mr. Kim, a retired covert agent living a quiet life as a bank employee and single father who is forced to unearth his lethal past when his high school daughter is kidnapped.

Jointly produced by Studio S and Fantagio, the series adapts a spin-off of the PTJ Webtoon Universe and has drawn comparisons by media outlets to the American action film Taken. It made television history as the first South Korean drama to utilize full artificial intelligence models to generate a three-minute action sequence, reducing visual effects and production costs.

Agent Kim Reactivated aired on SBS TV from June 26 to July 25, 2026, every Friday and Saturday at 21:50 (KST), and is available globally for streaming on Netflix. The series was commercially and critically success, with praise directed at So Ji-sub's emotional performance and the core "father-trio" dynamic, though the finale drew minor viewer controversy regarding heavy product placement (PPL). It achieved a peak nationwide rating of 23.1%, making it one of the highest-rated Friday–Saturday dramas in SBS network history.

== Synopsis ==
Kim Do-hyeon, known as Mr. Kim, is a former North-South Korean covert operative who retired to live as an office worker and single father, fulfilling his late wife's wishes. When his daughter, Min-ji, is kidnapped, Kim utilizes his past combat training to rescue her. His sudden activity draws the attention of the National Special Missions Bureau. During his search, Kim aligns with two other fathers who are also former operatives: Seong Han-soo and Park Jin-cheol. The trio faces opposition from various figures, including construction executive Ju Gang-chan, an associate named Jung Sang-a, and Park Kang-seong, a North Korean agent.

== Cast and characters ==
=== Main ===
- So Ji-sub as Kim Do-hyeon / Mr. Kim (Hong Dong-yeong as young Kim): A typical middle-aged salaryman at a bank and a single father raising his teenage daughter, Min-ji. He's secretly a North Korean defector, later serving as a South Korean special forces operative, forced to conceal his lethal past and his identity as "Agent 66".
- Choi Dae-hoon as Seong Han-soo: A former Olympic Taekwondo gold medalist and three-time World Taekwondo champion who runs his own martial arts dojo. He's a long-time friend and comrade of Kim.
- Yoon Kyung-ho as Park Jin-cheol: A Korean Marine Corps veteran of the elite "Cheonsan" special forces unit. He's also a long-time friend and comrade of Kim, and a volunteer member of the Marine Corps Veterans Association.
- Joo Sang-wook as Ju Gang-chan: A very wealthy and powerful figure, he's the president of Juhak Construction and the father of his daughter Ju Hye-ri. He maintains a private security force composed of former special forces mercenaries and relies heavily on corruption and physical intimidation to eliminate competition and adversaries to his business.
- Son Na-eun as Jung Sang-a: A Special Missions Directorate (SMD) agent who's assigned to keep Kim under surveillance while working undercover as his co-worker.
- Kim Sung-kyu as Park Gang-seong (Yang Hee-sang as young Gang-seong): A North Korean operative who's tasked with infiltrating South Korea to bring Kim back to the North.
- Lee Jae-yong as Ri Eung-ryeong: The Director General of North Korea's General Bureau of Intelligence on South Korea.
- Won Hyun-jun as Kang Guk-cheol / Mole Cricket: The director of the Special Missions Directorate (SMD), operating under the codename "Mole Cricket".
- Park Jin-woo as Im Ho-won: The owner of a laundromat located in Kim's block and another undercover SMD agent assigned to monitor Kim.
- Jo Bok-rae as Jung-dae / Gold Teeth: A gangster and subordinate of Gang-chan. He's known as "Gold Teeth" after Gang-chan forcibly pulled all of his teeth out and replaced them with gold.
- Lee Dong-ha as Secretary Nam: Gang-chan's chief of staff and bodyguard.
- Seo Su-min as Kim Min-ji (Kong I-jae as baby Min-ji, Choi Ha-yoon as 7-year-old Min-ji, and Lee A-ra as 13-year-old Min-ji): Kim's daughter and a sophomore at Songin High School. She's a constant victim of bullying stemming from being raised in a single parent household and struggles to get along at school and at home.
- Yu Ji-ahn as Ju Hye-ri: Gang-chan's daughter and a student at Songin High School.

=== Supporting ===
- Kang Hee-do as Agent Jang: A member of SMD.
- Kim Kyeong-ryong as Assemblyman Shim Eui-won: A member of South Korea's National Assembly and a close political aide to Gang-chan.
- Kim Dae-han as Kim Sang-man: A subordinate of Gold Teeth.
- Kim Yoon-bae as Park Kang-min: Another subordinate of Gold Teeth.
- Lee Kyeong-chae as Kang Hye-ryeong: Min-ji's friend.
- Choi Bum-ho as Director Jang So-jang: A General of the South Korean special forces' unit, "Cheonsan" who's overseen Kim during his time as an ROK operative.
- Chael as Kim Nam-hoon: A student and volleyball player at Songin High School.
- Bae Ji-wan as Reggae Hair: A gang member who works for Seong-ho.
- Kim Mi-hye as an anchor
- Lee Na-yeon as Park Da-bin: Jin-cheol's daughter.

=== Special appearances ===
- Seo Ji-hye as Im Yu-jin: Kim's wife, who dies right after giving birth to Min-ji.
- Hwang Seong-bin as Seong Min-ho: Hye-ri's gangster friend.
- Ok Taec-yeon as Park Yeong-gwang (Kang Ye-chan as young Yeong-gwang): A North Korean operative and Gang-seong's older brother.
- Yoo Hee-je as Oh Min-cheol: A juvenile offender and a south side collector of Gold Teeth's gang.
- Won Tae-min as Shin Seong-ho: A gang leader who took Min-ji's phone.
- Kim Ji-young as Kang Ji-yeong: Jin-cheol's wife and a former Marine Corps Brigadier General.
- Im Cheol-hyeong as Im Do-hyeon: The Vice Minister of National Security whose interests are closely intertwined with Gang-chan.
- Park Ji-il as the Prime Minister of South Korea
- Song Kyung-cheol as Jo Pyeong-gyeon: Kim's teacher who is a powerful figure in the underworld.

== Episodes ==
No.	Original release date	South Korea viewers (millions)
1	June 26, 2026	1.971
Mr. Kim raises his daughter Kim Min-ji as a single father, struggles to get along as she grows older. While having dinner with his friends and former operatives Seong Han-soo and Park Jin-cheol, attract the attention of a group of thugs Kim had encountered earlier. Jin-cheol incites a brawl while being restrained by Han-soo before being subdued by police while Kim walks away. Ju Hye-ri, the daughter of Ju Gang-chan, and her friends spot Min-ji speaking with Hye-ri's love interest Kim Nam-hoon. Hye-ri confronts Min-ji before both become entangled in a physical altercation. The school summons their fathers, Ju Gang-chan and Kim respectively. Kim apologizes to Gang-Chan, aware of his status as a powerful figure, much to the ire of Min-ji. She refuses to return home despite her birthday being the next day, which is also the day her mother died. Min-ji goes missing the next day, prompting Kim to investigate. He encounters Hye-ri and her friend, who is also a thug. He attempts to take out Kim, revealing bullet wounds and scars all over his body, and his true past as a South Korean covert operative who defected from North Korea; partaking in missions against the North, who presumes Kim (codename "66") to be dead.
2	June 27, 2026	3.253
In 2008, Agent Kim, an operative of the Cheonsan unit, assassinates a high-ranking North Korean general. Immediately after, he visits his wife in the hospital, before she dies from childbirth complications. He holds his own general hostage, having broken his promise numerous times to discharge Kim after a number of missions. Fast forward to the present on the night Min-ji went missing, Hye-ri and her friends lure Min-ji behind the school and both become involved in another fight before Hye-ri knocks Min-ji out. Believing that Min-ji is dead, she enlists Jung-dae (also known as "Gold teeth"), a subordinate of her father, to dispose of Min-ji's body, unaware that she is still alive. North Korea discovers that Kim is alive and Director General on South Korean intelligence, Ri Eung-ryeong sends Park Gang-seong, who believes that Kim is responsible for his brother Young-kwang's death, to kill him. Gang-seong sneaks into South Korea and encounters Jin-cheol at a police station before Jin-cheol breaks himself out, realizing Kim is in danger. Kim himself goes out of his way to find his daughter before he is arrested by local police.
3	July 3, 2026	3.767
The Special Missions Directorate (SMD), its operatives Jung Sang-a and Im Ho-won, who are Kim's co-worker and neighbor respectively, and Gang-seong begin to tail Kim. Kim breaks free of police custody and enlists Han-soo to find his daughter by tracking her cellphone's location. Gang-chan becomes suspicious of Hye-ri's behavior and orders his bodyguards to investigate. Kim and Han-soo find themselves in an abandoned clubhouse occupied by a gang specializing in online scams and organized crime. The duo subdues everyone inside including the ringleaders before being stopped at gunpoint by Gang-seong.
4	July 4, 2026	4.430
In 1997, Major Ri Eung-ryeong recruits Kim and Park Young-kwang on the premise of scouting for young athletes. Instead, it was a ploy to train the boys into becoming elite operatives for North Korea. Kim is assigned number "73" while Park is given "66" as both undergo intense training. Their squad sneaks into South Korea in a covert mission to kill top South Korean figures, but it turned out to be a trap as someone from North Korea tipped off the mission to South Korea, resulting in the entire squad being killed except for Kim. Gang-seong, believing Kim stole his brother's his "66" identity, labels him "fake 66" before being stopped by Sang-a and Ho-won. Kim and Han-soo convince Sang-a and Ho-won to let them go before Gang-seong escapes. The duo reunites with Jin-cheol and begins to trace their way to Min-ji at Myeongpo Port before being stopped by SMD director Kang Guk-cheol. Han-soo distracts Guk-cheol and both fall into a river while Kim drives off in his Jeep; Jin-cheol surrenders himself to the SMD. At the port, Jung-dae decides to use Min-ji as leverage against his boss Gang-chan. However, Min-ji, who was presumed dead, wakes up in a cold storage warehouse, much to the surprise of Jung-dae.
5	July 10, 2026	4.021
Jung-dae's henchmen, Kim Sang-man and Park Gang-min are attacked by Kim upon his arrival to Myeongpo Port. He kills Sang-man and chases down Gang-min before being interrupted by Gang-seong. Kim and Gang-seong both fight before Kim reveals that before Gang-seong's brother died in Kim's arms, as he prevented Kim from committing suicide and urged him to stay alive. In addition, he reveals Ri Eung-ryeong was the one that leaked the mission to South Korea in a ploy to make himself the Director General. Min-ji lures Jung-dae into the warehouse and knocks him out while Jin-cheol frees himself from SMD captivity and reunites downstream with Han-soo and an unconscious Guk-cheol. Gang-chan's right-hand man, Secretary Nam and his crew, arrive at the port and torture Jung-dae, before Jung-dae reveals Min-ji is alive. Nam orders a frantic search party and leaves one of his guards behind to finish off Jung-dae, but Jung-dae manages to kill the guard and escape unnoticed. Kim chases down Min-ji, unaware her father is also at the port. She unknowingly hitches a ride from Gang-chan's SUV while SMD director Guk-cheol is found by his fellow agents and decides to take Min-ji hostage, knowing that it is the only way to lure and capture Kim.
6	July 11, 2026	4.582
Kim reunites with Han-soo and make their way to Gang-chan's estate. Gang-chan orders Min-ji to be killed but is forced to hide her in the basement as SMD agents storm his house. Gang-chan's guards force the SMD out while Sang-a and Ho-won sneak in through the rear and successfully rescue Min-ji before handing her over to Guk-cheol. As they return to SMD headquarters, Han-soo hides as a stowaway under Guk-cheol's Jeep while Kim chases from behind. Guk-cheol orders SMD HQ to be reinforced by tactical units, anticipating Kim's arrival. As Han-soo sneaks into SMD HQ, Guk-cheol interrogates Min-ji, revealing her father's lethal past. Vice Minister of National Security Im Do-hyeon visits Guk-cheol and scolds him before demanding the handover of Min-ji, to which Guk-cheol rebukes him. Han-soo and Jin-cheol rescue Min-ji but are surrounded by SMD agents and SWAT teams. Vice minister Im suddenly appears and orders the troops to stand down while being held in a chokehold by Kim.
7	July 17, 2026	4.476
Kim holds vice minister Im hostage as leverage to force the SMD and tactical units into standing down. Kim, Han-soo, Jin-cheol, and Min-ji are briefly stopped by Sang-a and Ho-won, but Kim promises to surrender once he guarantees his daughter's safety. They drive off, dumping minister Im in the process. Nam follows them and carjacks their vehicle, but Kim and the trio fight back, subduing Nam and his men. The group makes their way back to Gang-chan's estate where Kim overpowers Gang-chan and forces him to apologize on his knees to Min-ji. Later, the SMD surrounds Kim's apartment as he and Min-ji have their last meal together before Kim, Han-soo, and Jin-cheol turn themselves in. Gang-chan bribes Assemblyman Shim Eui-won into suppressing any police investigations against him while Ho-won closes his laundromat following Kim's arrest. Kim is later transferred into North Korean custody where he finds himself in a North Korean torture chamber.
8	July 18, 2026	4.686
Kim is tortured for several days in North Korea but escapes, only for it to turn out to be a set up to test his loyalty. Impressed, Director Jang gives Kim one final mission; if successful, he and his daughter would be free and be given new identities. Kim requests Han-soo and Jin-cheol to be released in exchange, and both are promptly dumped in Haenam. Kim is tasked with protecting a high-ranking North Korean officer who recently defected, which turns out to be Director General Ri Eung-ryeong. Just days prior, North Korea discovered Ri's plot the make himself the Director General, forcing Ri to evade arrest. Meanwhile, the Juhak Heritage Resort is used to host North Korea for Inter-Korean talks. Upon learning of Kim's true identity and Ri's defection from vice minister Im, Gang-chan bribes Suh Gwang-nam, the head of North Korea's delegation in exchange for information leading to Kim and Ri's capture. North Korean agents storm the safehouse holding Ri, which was also guarded by Sang-a and Ho-won. All manage to escape but the Prime Minister of South Korea Sim Jong-seon, orders the SMD to detain Kim and Ri, who are seeking refuge at Jin-cheol's place. SMD agents arrive and Guk-cheol declares that Kim's mission has failed.
9	July 24, 2026	4.135
After Kim and Ri escaped, Gang-chan suggests North Korea threaten to cancel the Inter-Korean talks unless South Korea hands Kim and Ri over. Prime Minister Sim orders the SMD to do just that. Gang-chan is to personally execute Kim but decides to do so later, before being subdued by Han-soo and Jin-cheol. Sang-a, Ho-won, and Kim's trio devise a plan to sneak into the hotel and rescue Ri. Meanwhile, Ri is secretly brought back to the hotel and interrogated by Gwang-nam. He offers Ri a chance to live, in exchange for the key to a safe containing $8 million USD in casino chips Ri funneled from the North into a casino in Macau. Kim knocks out Gwang-nam and comes to Ri's aid, but the North Koreans dsicover Kim and his crew have infiltrated the hotel. Han-soo and Jin-cheol distract a majority of the North Koreans while Gwang-nam regains consciousness and orders Ri and Kim to be killed. Gang-chan frees himself and reveals that he is holding Han-soo's and Jin-cheol's kids at gunpoint; Kim and Ri force their way through a shootout but are caught in a Mexican standoff by armed North Koreans.
10	July 25, 2026	4.550
Sang-a, Ho-won, Kim, and Ri escape but are stopped by Gang-seong, confronting Ri about the truth of his brother's death and why Kim is protecting the man that used them as bait. Kim explains the whole operation was to protect his daughter, before the group drives off. Kim then diverges and finds Da-bin and Tae-hun, Jin-cheol's and Han-soo's kids respectively, are being held at gunpoint by Secretary Nam. Gang-chan forces Kim into an MMA cage with Han-soo and Jin-cheol. Both must kill Kim in exchange for freeing their kids, but the trio break themselves out of the cage, taking down Gang-chan and Nam. North and South Korea sign a free-trade agreement while South Korea informally agrees not to take retaliatory action against North Korea for the shootout at Juhak Resort. The North Korean delegation leaves and Gwang-nam orders his men to inform the Workers Party of Korea that Kim and Ri have been executed. Ri is treated at a hospital while Director Jang interviews Ri on North Korea's ballistic missile capabilities. While in his sleep, Ri is kidnapped by Kim, who hands Ri over to Gang-seong, both promising to stay alive. Ri wakes up on the coast of North Korea before being chased by his own soldiers. Kim phones an old contact who agrees to orchestrate Juhak Construction's downfall at a price. The government opens an investigation into the company. Assemblyman Shim, Vice Minister Im, Gang-chan, and Hye-ri (who fled to Cambodia) are all arrested. A wounded Gang-chan is escorted out of the hospital but is stabbed by Jung-dae. The government fakes Kim's death, while Kim and Min-ji are given new identities and relocate away from Seoul. North Korea confirms Kim's "death" and his profile is deleted by Gwang-nam, who now sits as the new Director General. Kim appears for a "job interview" by a man connected to his old contact, with Kim preparing to "interview" with a duel.

== Production ==
=== Development ===
In April 2023, The Grimm Entertainment signed a drama production contract for the Naver webtoon Manager Kim with Fantagio. The webtoon is a spin-off series centered around the character Manager Kim from Lookism, alongside Park Jin-cheol from My Life as a Loser and Seong Han-soo from Viral Hit. The series marks a major expansion of the "One Source Multi-Use" (OSMU) strategy for the PTJ Universe. It is described as a revenge-action drama revolving around a father who uses a dangerous skillset to rescue his daughter. Media and production sources have frequently compared its premise to the Hollywood film Taken.

The script is written by Nam Dae-joong, known for his work on films such as The Last Ride (2016) and Homme Fatale (2019), and directed by Yi Seung-young, whose previous credits include Voice 2 (2018), Tracer (2022), and Wonderful World (2024). It is planned and produced by Studio S along with Fantagio.

=== Casting ===
In September 2025, My Daily reported that So Ji-sub, Choi Dae-hoon, and Yoon Kyung-ho would lead the series as the central trio. So was cast in the titular role of Mr. Kim, marking his return to the action-noir genre, while Choi was selected to portray Seong Han-soo and Yoon was cast as Park Jin-cheol. Media outlets highlighted So's casting by drawing comparisons between his character's trajectory in the revenge thriller and Bryan Mills from the action film Taken. The following month, Kim Sung-kyu and Son Na-eun were reportedly joined the cast. By the end of 2025, Joo Sang-wook, Lee Dong-ha, and Jo Bok-rae were cast to play various villain roles.

In May 2026, Won Hyun-jun was confirmed to join the cast. The same month, SBS officially confirmed the onscreen appearances of So, Choi, Yoon, Joo, Son, and Kim.

=== Visual effects ===
The series was the first Korean drama to utilize artificial intelligence (AI) generation for an entire major sequence. In the first two episodes, which depict the backstory of protagonist Mr. Kim (played by So Ji-sub) as a North Korean secret agent, a three-minute action sequence was produced through AI technology rather than live-action filming. The sequence includes depictions of building explosions, car chases on snowy roads and inside tunnels, a vehicle overturning and crashing into a river, gunfights, and martial arts choreography.

The sequence was created by Morpheus Studio using its "AICRON" platform, an AI content creation system launched in February 2026. The platform uses a node-based integrated pipeline that processes prompts, image and video generation, audio generation, and editing on a single interface using various commercial AI models. The AI production was supervised by Ryu Jae-hwan, the vice president of Morpheus Studio and a visual effects (VFX) director who previously won technical awards at the Grand Bell Awards and Blue Dragon Film Awards.

According to the production team, an AI-generated sequence was selected to manage the high location, set construction, pyrotechnic, and conventional VFX costs associated with filming a large-scale scene within budget constraints. The production team stated that the platform minimized character consistency issues typical of AI-generated video, allowing the actor's facial expressions and appearance to remain stable during fast-moving action shots. Following the broadcast, South Korean media outlets reported that audience reception to the visual quality of the sequence was generally positive, with minimal criticism regarding visual awkwardness.

Ryu stated that the sequence demonstrated AI could be used to construct entire narrative scenes rather than just replacing short VFX shots. He argued that when used with clear planning and production objectives, AI technology can function as a viable tool for storytellers.

== Release ==
SBS confirmed that Agent Kim Reactivated was slated to air in 2026, as part of their Friday–Saturday lineup. Later, the series premiered on SBS TV on June 26, at 21:50 (KST), and is available for streaming on Netflix.

A two-part special titled Agent Kim Reactivated the Universe (Korean: 김부장 더 유니버스) were broadcast on SBS TV on July 31, and August 1, 2026, and it featured behind-the-scenes footage, cast commentary with lead actors, interviews, and production details regarding the series.

== Reception ==
=== Critical response ===
The series received generally positive reviews from critics, who praised its balance between action sequences and character emotional development. James Melzer of MovieWeb considered the series a blend of the Taken and John Wick franchises, with influences from the television series Reacher, noting that it builds substantial suspense before transitioning into action. Both Melzer and Joel Keller of Decider commented on the show's pacing; Keller observed that the first episode is a "slow build," but noted that this deliberate pacing allows for a deeper understanding of the protagonist's transition from an elite agent to a mild-mannered bank worker.

Critics also highlighted the emotional core of the series. Monica Yadav of the Hindustan Times praised its "confident start," stating that while the show displays expected revenge-thriller tropes, the central emotional narrative is what keeps viewers invested. Yadav concluded that if the writing remains focused and develops more nuanced antagonists, the show has the potential to become one of the best action thrillers of the year. Additionally, critics noted positive reception regarding the release strategy and early audience metrics; Melzer considered Netflix's two-episode weekly release model highly effective and pointed out the show's strong early audience scores on IMDb, where it achieved an average user rating of 8 out of 10.

Domestic South Korean media also gave high praise. Star Today noted that lead actor So Ji-sub, returning to SBS after 13 years since Master's Sun (2013), successfully blended a cold agent with profound fatherly love, delivering convincing eye acting and action scenes that set a new benchmark for his career. Furthermore, the "Dad Universe" trio composed of So Ji-sub, Choi Dae-hoon, and Yoon Kyung-ho was well received; reports praised the contrast and chemistry between their top-tier combat skills and their "relatable dad" personas around their children, which became a key element of the show's popularity. A column analysis in Economic Review argued that the product placement (PPL) of the auto repair shop (SpeedMate) transformed "car repair" into a symbolic metaphor for "repairing life," serving as a positive example of integrating commercial sponsorship with script narrative.

=== Audience response and controversy ===
Following the broadcast of the series finale, it received widespread praise from South Korean viewers as a "strong start and strong finish" (용두용미), with many expressing satisfaction with the heartwarming conclusion that punished evil and promoted good.

However, during the final 20 minutes of episode 10, a heavy concentration of product placement (PPL)—including caffeinated candy, automobiles, conveyor-belt sushi, and eyewear brands—sparked dissatisfaction among some viewers and netizens, who criticized the excessive advertising density for ruining immersion and emotional continuity. This phenomenon sparked discussion regarding the differences in production environments between broadcast networks and OTT platforms, with some viewers expressing a desire for a potential second season to be produced by an OTT platform (such as Netflix) to minimize commercial interruptions.

=== Viewership ===
Agent Kim Reactivated recorded strong viewership ratings upon its debut. According to Nielsen Korea, the premiere episode broadcast on June 26, 2026, achieved a nationwide rating of 9.5%, marking the highest premiere rating for any miniseries broadcast in 2026. The series experienced a significant increase for its second episode, rising 6.2 percentage points to a nationwide rating of 15.7%, with a peak real-time rating reaching 18.1%. This marked the first time a miniseries surpassed the 15% viewership threshold within two episodes since the third season of The Penthouse: War in Life in 2021.

By its fourth episode on July 4, 2026, the series surpassed the 20% mark, recording a nationwide viewership rating of 21.6%. This achievement set a record as the fastest SBS Friday–Saturday drama to cross the 20% threshold, surpassing the pacing of previous series such as The Fiery Priest, Hot Stove League, and The Penthouse 2. The 21.6% rating also positioned Agent Kim Reactivated as the third highest-rated SBS Friday–Saturday drama series in the network's history, behind The Penthouse 2 (29.2%) and The Fiery Priest (22%).

Agent Kim Reactivated : South Korea viewers per episode (millions)

Season	Episode number										Average
Season	1	2	3	4	5	6	7	8	9	10	Average
1	1.971	3.253	3.767	4.430	4.021	4.582	4.476	4.686	4.135	4.550	3.987

Source: Audience measurement performed nationwide by Nielsen Korea.

Average TV viewership ratings
Ep.	Original broadcast date	Average audience share (Nielsen Korea)	
Ep.	Original broadcast date	Nationwide	Seoul
1	June 26, 2026	9.5% (2nd)	9.8% (1st)
2	June 27, 2026	15.7% (1st)	15.9% (1st)
3	July 3, 2026	18.8% (1st)	19.6% (1st)
4	July 4, 2026	21.6% (1st)	22.7% (1st)
5	July 10, 2026	20.5% (1st)	21.0% (1st)
6	July 11, 2026	22.3% (1st)	23.2% (1st)
7	July 17, 2026	21.9% (1st)	22.6% (1st)
8	July 18, 2026	23.1% (1st)	23.6% (1st)
9	July 24, 2026	21.5% (1st)	21.3% (1st)
10	July 25, 2026	23.0% (1st)	23.4% (1st)
Average		19.8%	20.3%
Special 1	July 31, 2026	4.5% (11th)	4.8% (8th)
Special 2	August 1, 2026	3.5% (12th)	3.7% (8th)
In the table above, the blue numbers represent the lowest ratings and the red numbers represent the highest ratings.

== See also ==
- Taken, has a similar premise about tracking down a kidnapped daughter – 2008 film by Pierre Morel
