= List of film music awards =

This is a list of film music awards.

== By category ==
=== Best film music ===
- BAFTA Award for Best Film Music
- César Award for Best Original Music
- Golden Arena for Best Film Music
- Golden Calf for Best Music
- Golden Goblet Award for Best Music
- Los Angeles Film Critics Association Award for Best Music
- Mainichi Film Award for Best Music
- Prix Iris for Best Original Music
- Saturn Award for Best Music

=== Best composer ===
- Critics' Choice Award for Best Composer
- European Film Award for Best Composer

=== Best music director ===
- Bollywood Movie Award – Best Music Director
- Filmfare Award for Best Music Director
- Filmfare Award for Best Music Director – Tamil
- Filmfare Award for Best Music Director – Telugu
- ITFA Best Music Director Award
- National Film Award for Best Music Direction
- Santosham Best Music Director Award
- Sarasaviya Best Music Direction Award
- Screen Award for Best Music Director

=== Best score ===
- AACTA Award for Best Original Music Score
- Academy Award for Best Original Score
- Canadian Screen Award for Best Original Score
- Chicago Film Critics Association Award for Best Original Score
- Dallas–Fort Worth Film Critics Association Award for Best Musical Score
- Academy of Canadian Cinema and Television Award for Best Achievement in Music – Original Score
- Guldbagge Award for Best Original Score
- Golden Globe Award for Best Original Score
- Goya Award for Best Original Score
- Grammy Award for Best Score Soundtrack for Visual Media
- Lumière Award for Best Music
- Magritte Award for Best Original Score
- Online Film Critics Society Award for Best Original Score
- David di Donatello for Best Score
- Nastro d'Argento for Best Score
- Washington D.C. Area Film Critics Association Award for Best Score

=== Best soundtrack ===
- Africa Movie Academy Award for Best Soundtrack
- Empire Award for Best Soundtrack
- World Soundtrack Academy
- ARIA Award for Best Original Soundtrack, Cast or Show Album
- Grammy Award for Best Compilation Soundtrack for Visual Media

=== Best song ===
- Academy Award for Best Original Song
- Black Reel Award for Best Original or Adapted Song
- Black Reel Award for Outstanding Original Song
- Canadian Screen Award for Best Original Song
- Critics' Choice Movie Award for Best Song
- Academy of Canadian Cinema and Television Award for Best Achievement in Music – Original Song
- Golden Globe Award for Best Original Song
- Golden Raspberry Award for Worst Original Song
- Metro Manila Film Festival Award for Best Original Theme Song
- Mnet Asian Music Award for Best OST
- MTV Movie Award for Best Song from a Movie
- Satellite Award for Best Original Song
- Vijay Award for Favourite Song
- World Soundtrack Award for Best Original Song Written Directly for a Film

=== Best singer ===
- ITFA Best Female Playback Award
- ITFA Best Male Playback Award
- National Film Award for Best Female Playback Singer
- National Film Award for Best Male Playback Singer
- Odisha State Film Award for Best Singer
- Saturn Award for Best Music

=== Various ===
- Georges Delerue Award
- International Film Music Critics Association
- Primetime Emmy Award for Outstanding Main Title Theme Music
- Primetime Emmy Award for Outstanding Music Composition for a Miniseries, Movie, or a Special
- Primetime Emmy Award for Outstanding Music Composition for a Series

=== Worst music ===
- Golden Raspberry Award for Worst Musical Score
