= So Ji-sub =

South Korean actor (born 1977)

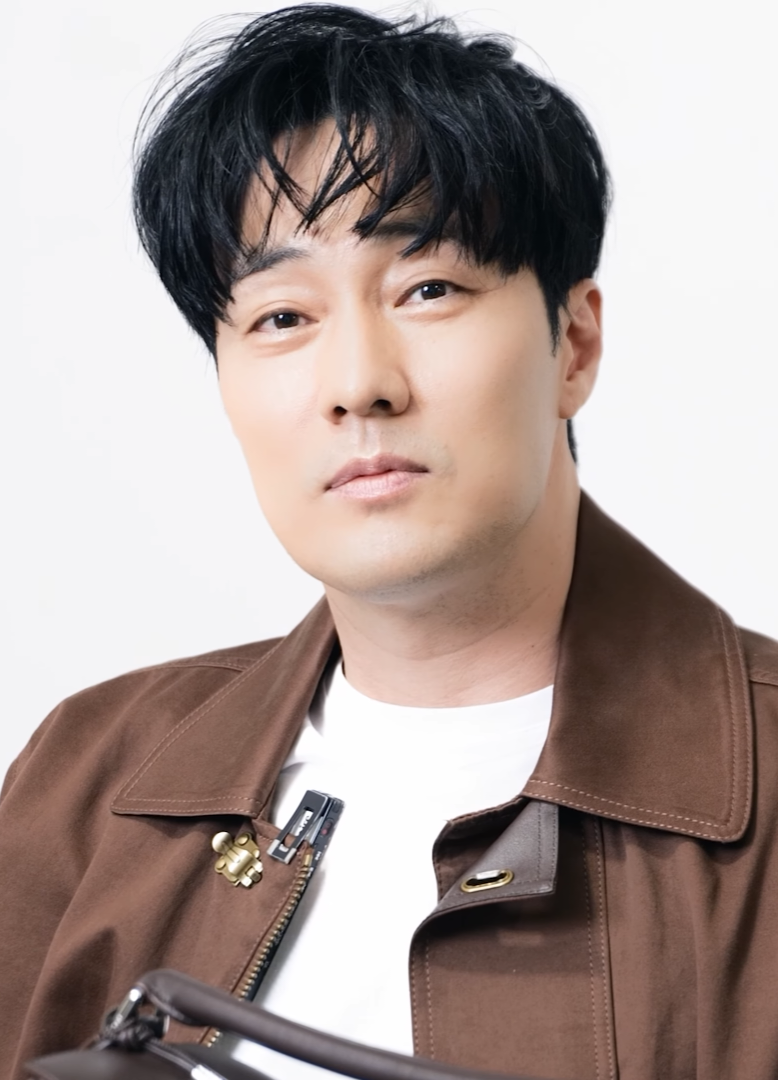
- So in May 2025
- Born: November 4, 1977 (age 49); Seoul, South Korea
- Occupations: Actor; rapper
- Years active: 1995–present
- Agent: 51K
- Spouse: Cho Eun-jung (m. 2020)

Korean name
- Hangul: 소지섭
- Hanja: 蘇志燮
- RR: So Jiseop
- MR: So Chisŏp
- Website: sojisub.com

So Ji-sub (Korean: 소지섭; born November 4, 1977) is a South Korean actor. After making his entertainment debut as a jeans model, he became known for his lead roles in television dramas and films. So has also released several hip hop EPs.

== Early life ==
So Ji-sub was born on November 4, 1977, in Seoul, South Korea and moved to Incheon when he was in his third year of elementary school. Self-described as introverted and insecure in his childhood and teenage years, So trained to become a professional swimmer for eleven years and got the bronze medal at the Korean National Games. His parents divorced when he was young. He has one older sister who lives in Australia.

He tried out modeling simply because he wanted to pose alongside hip-hop artist Kim Sung-jae, who was the celebrity face for a clothing brand at the time. "I was never really interested in becoming a celebrity," So said. "My life was all about swimming and hip-hop music. I did modeling because I wanted to see Kim and also because it was the best way to earn good easy money."

== Career ==
=== Acting ===
So was chosen as a model for jeans brand 292513=STORM in 1995, then made his acting debut in the sitcom Three Guys and Three Girls and the television drama Model. But whereas fellow 292513=STORM model Song Seung-heon quickly rose to stardom, So had difficulty raising his profile. He appeared in small roles on television throughout the late 1990s and early 2000s, and started to gain popularity when he was cast as the male second lead in Glass Slippers in 2002. He played his first lead role in the time travel historical drama Thousand Years of Love.

So began to rise to fame with 2004 hit drama What Happened in Bali At that time, So thought he would end up being a supporting actor. But later that year, he had his breakout role as a tragic hero in the critically acclaimed melodrama I'm Sorry, I Love You. It established him as a top star in Korea, as well as all over Asia. In a 2009 interview, So said he still considers the two the best television dramas in his filmography.

So enlisted for mandatory military service in 2005 as a public relations officer with the Mapo District Office, and was discharged on April 27, 2007. He made his comeback in Jang Hoon's directorial debut Rough Cut, in which he played a gangster who dreams of becoming an actor. Because of the film's low budget, So and costar Kang Ji-hwan decided to invest their fees back into the movie, and were credited as producers. So's performance was well received by audiences and critics, and the film became a surprise box office hit.

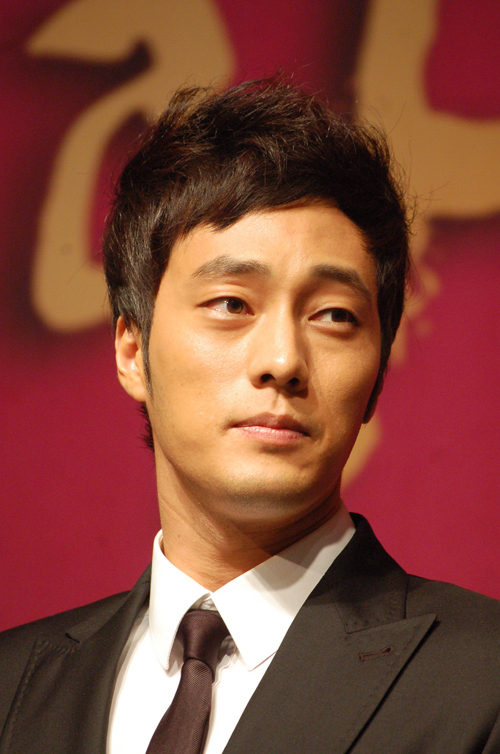
So in 2009

In 2009, So attempted to break into the Japanese and Chinese markets. In I am GHOST, an action drama that aired in 24 five-minute episodes on Japan's mobile-exclusive broadcaster BeeTV, he played a mysterious killer on the run with a high school girl. So spoke no lines in the mobile drama, and was "worried whether (their) emotions would be delivered just through (their) motions." The year before, he had appeared in a supporting role as a monster in the Japanese manga live-action adaptation GeGeGe No Kitaro 2: Kitaro and the Millenium Curse.

So starred opposite Zhang Ziyi in the Chinese romantic comedy Sophie's Revenge, saying, "I wanted to do a bright and cheery role because I've played so many sad and gloomy ones." He later signed with a Chinese talent agency, ATN Entertainment. So then returned to Korean television with Cain and Abel, about two doctor brothers with an intense sibling rivalry. His performance received critical acclaim, and won him Best Actor at the 2009 Grimae Awards, an honorable award chosen by directors in every broadcasting station in Korea.

In 2010 So headlined the big-budget Korean War epic Road No. 1, but despite high expectations, the series tanked in the ratings, averaging 6% for its entire run.

So then played a boxer who falls in love with a blind girl in romantic melodrama Always (Korean title: Only You), directed by auteur Song Il-gon. It was the opening film of the 2011 Busan International Film Festival.

After portraying a workaholic detective in the cyber criminal investigative service in TV procedural Phantom, So starred in the film A Company Man, about a hitman in a killer-for-hire company who, after he falls in love and decides he wants out of his job, finds himself the target of his former colleagues.

Later that year he starred in Master's Sun, a horror-romantic comedy written by the Hong sisters. Known for his melodramatic roles, So made an acting transformation in Master's Sun, playing a character with charm. The drama was a commercial hit and renewed his domestic and international popularity. So then starred in another romantic comedy series Oh My Venus, about a celebrity trainer who helps a lawyer lose weight and find her inner beauty as they heal each other's emotional scars.

In 2017, So starred in the film The Battleship Island, which depicts the unknown history behind the actual Hashima Island, where thousands of conscripted Joseon people were forced to work to death during the Japanese colonial era. He plays Gyeongseong's best fighter who brought peace to the entire Jongno district.

In 2018, So starred alongside Son Ye-jin in the romance film Be with You, based on the Japanese novel of the same name. The same year, he returned to the small screen with spy comedy drama My Secret Terrius. So won his first major award, the "Daesang (Grand Prize)" at the MBC Drama Awards for his performance.

In 2022, he starred in the MBC medical-legal drama Doctor Lawyer in the title role as a genius double-board surgeon turned lawyer. He also appeared in Choi Dong-hoon's science fiction action film Alienoid. So next starred in the Netflix action-thriller Mercy for None on June 6, 2025.

In 2026, So starred in Agent Kim Reactivated as a former North Korean operative turned bank manager and single father, who returns to action after his daughter's kidnapping. Adapted from the Naver webtoon Manager Kim, the drama earned praise for its chemistry between So and fellow main cast members Choi Dae-Hoon and Yoon Kyung-Ho. The drama achieved its peak national viewership rating of 23.1%, one of the highest in SBS history.

=== Book and music releases ===
In 2010, So published his photo-essay collection, So Ji-sub's Journey. The volume covers stories and photos over the past 13 years since his debut, using unpretentious language and sensitive photography taken during So's trips to the DMZ and Gangwon Province. The usually taciturn and stoic actor revealed his inner thoughts throughout the book, with essays on his favorite number 51 (reflected in the name of his company - it means a 50-50 probability then believing just 1% more; the K stands for Korea), Romeo and Juliet, why he likes rainy days, and stories about his interactions with other celebrities and artists such as Tiger JK. Within ten days of its release, the book hit the bestseller list, and entered its third printing.

A professed longtime hip-hop lover, So rapped for two original tracks – "Lonely Life" and "Foolish Love" – under the artist pseudonym "G" or "G-Sonic" for the soundtracks of Rough Cut and Cain and Abel respectively. In 2011, he released another digital single Pick Up Line under his own name. Two teaser videos were released, the first one described as a comedic version that featured guest stars Jung Joon-ha (who is a close friend of So's) and Kim Byung-man (whom So named as one of his favorite comedians). The single, along with the music video itself, was released on February 17, 2011, but recorded low sales.

In 2011, he published a second book of photo-essays titled Only You with So Ji-sub featuring photographs, notes and commentary on playing his movie character.

On March 14, 2012, he launched a magazine for his fans titled SONICe; inside were So's suggested dating ideas and locations, favorite food and books, and more stories through his eyes. Its name is a combination of "so nice" and "Sonic," which is So's nickname.

So's first mini-album (or EP), Corona Borealis was released in March 2012. It featured collaborations with songwriter Kim Kun-woo, vocal trainer Mellow, soprano Han Kyung-mi, and singers Huh Gak and Bobby Kim. Bobby Kim complimented So's rapping in their duet track That Day, a Year Ago, saying, "So has a talent in feeling the groove and it's as good as his acting skills." So also starred in a music video of the album's title song "Some Kind of Story".

In January 2013, So released another rap EP titled 6 PM...Ground, and his recording process aired on Music Triangle as part of Mnet's Collabo One project. The four songs of the album were combined to make a 12-minute music drama starring So, Park Shin-hye and Yoo Seung-ho; which was also re-edited into individual music videos for each track.

In June 2014, So released his third electro-hip-hop EP titled 18 Years, which represents how long he has been in the industry since he debuted as an actor. He wrote and composed the title track (featuring the vocals of singer Satbyeol), and the other two tracks were collaborations with hip-hop group Soul Dive. He released another single in July 2015 titled So Ganzi, his second collaboration with Soul Dive.

== Other ventures ==
=== Ambassadorship ===
So was named the goodwill ambassador of Gangwon Province in an effort to boost tourism there, and a 51 kilometer-long trail in the province was named "So Ji-sub Road", which was unveiled to the public on May 20, 2012. He was the first Korean actor to have an entire road named after him.

He was also named promotional ambassadors for cyber crime prevention by the National Police Agency, helping to raise awareness and prevent cyber crimes such as hacking and Internet fraud by taking part in various promotional activities.

=== Investments ===
So is the owner of the Apgujeong-dong branch of CJ Foodville's A Twosome Place.

He has also helped imported foreign films, having invested in art-house films such as the U.S.-British-French co-production Philomena (2014), the Chinese film Coming Home (2014), the Japanese crime thriller The World of Kanako (2014), and the American horror film A Girl Walks Home Alone at Night (2015).

== Personal life ==
In 2019, So confirmed that he is in a relationship with former announcer and reporter Jo Eun-jung. On April 7, 2020, the actor's label 51K confirmed that he had registered his marriage with Jo.

== Filmography ==
=== Film ===
Year	Title	Role	Notes	Ref.
2002	Can't Live Without Robbery	Choi Kang-jo		
2008	Kitaro and the Millennium Curse	Yaksha	Japanese production	
2008	Rough Cut	Gang-pae		
2008	U-Turn	Ji-sub	Short film	
2009	Sophie's Revenge	Jeff	Chinese and Korean co-production	
2011	Always	Jang Cheol-min		
2012	A Company Man	Ji Hyeong-do		
2015	The Throne	King Jeongjo	Cameo	
2017	The Battleship Island	Choi Chil-sung		
2018	Be with You	Jung Woo-jin		
2022	Alienoid	Moon Do-seok		
2022	Confession	Yoo Min-ho		
2024	Alienoid: Return to the Future	Moon Do-seok		

=== Television series ===
Key
†	Denotes television productions that have not yet been released

Year	Title	Role	Notes	Ref.
1996	Three Guys and Three Girls	Kim Chul-soo		
1997	Model	Song Kyung-chul		
1998	MBC Best Theater: "What You Cherish Can Never Be Forgotten"	Dong-woo	Episode 316	
1998	I Hate You, But It's Fine	Chul-min		
2000	Love Story: "Miss Hip-hop & Mr. Rock"	Oh Chul-soo	Episode 6	
2000	MBC Best Theater: "Have You Ever Said 'I Love You'?"	Kyung-min	Episode 389	
2000	Wang Rung's Land	Park Min-ho		
2000	Because of You	Yoon Min-ki		
2000	Joa, Joa	Park Ji-sub		
2000	Cheers for the Women	Hwang Joon-won		
2001	Long Way	Ki-hyun		
2001	Delicious Proposal	Jang Hee-moon		
2001	Law Firm	Choi Jang-goon		
2002	We Are Dating Now	Choi Kyo-in		
2002	Glass Slippers	Park Chul-woong		
2003	Thousand Years of Love	General Guishil Ari / Kang In-chul		
2004	Something Happened in Bali	Kang In-wook		
2004	I'm Sorry, I Love You	Cha Moo-hyuk		
2009	Cain and Abel	Lee Cho-in / Oh Kang-ho		
2009	I am GHOST	Ghost	Japanese drama	
2010	Road No. 1	Lee Jang-woo		
2012	Phantom	Kim Woo-hyun / Park Gi-young		
2013	Master's Sun	Joo Joong-won		
2015	Warm and Cozy	Jeju Island restaurant owner	Cameo; episode 1	
2015–2016	Oh My Venus	Kim Young-ho / John Kim		
2018	My Secret Terrius	Kim Bon		
2022	Doctor Lawyer	Han Yi-han		
2025	Mercy for None	Nam Gi-jun		
2026	Agent Kim Reactivated	Manager Kim / Kim Do-hyeon		

=== Web series ===
Year	Title	Role	Ref.
2014–2015	One Sunny Day	Kim Ji-ho	

=== Television show ===
Year	Title	Role	Notes	Ref.
1997	Decision Inkigayo 43	MC		
1999	Declaration of Freedom Today is Saturday	MC		
1999–2000	Music Camp	MC	with Chae Rim	
2018	Little Cabin in the Woods	Cast member	with Park Shin-hye	

=== Music video appearances ===
Year	Title	Artist	Ref.
1997	"Goodbye Yesterday"	Turbo	
1999	"For You"	Ryu Chan	
2001	"The End"	Lee Hyun-woo	
2001	"Beautiful Days"	Jang Hye-jin	
2005	"Mr. Flower"	Jo Sung-mo	
2008	"Lonely Life"	G	
2010	"Smiling Goodbye"	Soya n Sun	
2011	"Pick Up Line"	So Ji-sub (feat. Shi Jin)	
2011	"Take"	Seo In-guk	
2012	"Some Kind of Story"	So Ji-sub (feat. Huh Gak and Mellow)	
2013	"Picnic"	So Ji-sub (feat. Younha)	
2013	"6PM...Ground"	So Ji-sub (feat. Mellow)	
2014	"18 Years"	So Ji-sub (feat. Satbyeol)	
2014	"Boy Go"	So Ji-sub (feat. Soul Dive)	

== Discography ==
=== Extended plays ===
List of extended plays, with selected details, chart positions, and sales
Title	Album details	Peak chart positions	Sales
Title	Album details	KOR	Sales
Corona Borealis	Released: March 13, 2012; Label: 51K & CJ E&M; Formats: CD, digital download; Track listing: 1. 11월 어느 날 2. 그렇고 그런 얘기 (feat. Huh Gak & Mellow); 3. 일년 전 그날 (with Bobby Kim); 4. 북쪽왕관자리 (feat. soprano Han Kyung-mi); 5. 그렇고 그런 얘기 (Inst.); 6. 1년 전 그날 (Bobby Kim only)	8	KOR: 5,142
6PM... Ground	Released: January 23, 2013; Label: 51K & CJ E&M; Formats: CD, digital download; Track listing: 1. 소풍 (feat. Younha); 2. 지우개 (feat. Mellow); 3. 눈금자 (feat. 테이커스); 4. 6시...운동장	7	KOR: 4,824+
18 Years	Released: June 24, 2014; Label: 51K & CJ E&M; Formats: CD, digital download; Track listing: 1. 18 Years (feat. Satbyeol); 2. Boy Go (feat. Soul Dive); 3. 환상 속의 그대 (Inside the Illusion) (feat. Soul Dive); 4. 18 Years (Inst.); 5. Boy Go (Inst.); 6. 환상 속의 그대 (Inside the Illusion) (Inst.)	—	—N/a
"—" denotes releases that did not chart or were not released in that region.

=== Single albums ===
List of single albums, with selected details, chart positions, and sales
Title	Album details	Peak chart positions	Sales
Title	Album details	KOR	Sales
Lonely Life (고독한 인생)	Released: August 13, 2008; Label: Kingpin Entertainment; Formats: Digital download; Track listing: 1. 고독한 인생 (and Amazing Soul, feat. Park Da-ye); 2. 고독한 인생 (Inst.)	(Note: The Gaon Music Chart was established in 2010.)	(Note: Data not available.)
Foolish Love (미련한 사랑)	Released: November 4, 2008; Label: SBS Contents Hub; Formats: Digital download; Track listing: 1. 11월 4일 그 후...(intro); 2. 미련한 사랑 (feat. Chae Dong-ha)	(Note: The Gaon Music Chart was established in 2010.)	(Note: Data not available.)
Pick Up Line	Released: February 17, 2011; Label: CJ E&M; Formats: CD, digital download; Track listing: 1. Pick Up Line (feat. Shi Jin); 2. Pick Up Line (Inst.)	—	—N/a
So Ganzi	Released: July 22, 2015; Label: 51K & CJ E&M; Formats: CD, digital download; Track listing: 1. So Ganzi (BLACK) (feat. Soul Dive, Newday); 2. So Ganzi (WHITE) (feat. Soul Dive, Newday)	—	—N/a
"—" denotes releases that did not chart or were not released in that region.

=== Singles ===
==== As lead artist ====
List of singles, with selected chart positions, year, and albums
Title	Year	Peak chart positions	Sales (DL)	Album
Title	Year	KOR	Sales (DL)	Album
"Pick Up Line" (Feat. Shi Jin)	2011	62	—N/a	Pick Up Line
"Some Kind of Story" (feat. Huh Gak and Mellow)	2012	54	—N/a	Corona Borealis
"Picnic" (feat. Younha)	2013	23	KOR: 175,312+	6PM... Ground
"Eraser" (feat. Mellow)	2013	56	—N/a	6PM... Ground
"18 Years" (feat. Satbyeol)	2014	81	—N/a	18 Years
"So Love"	2014	—	—N/a	Non-album singles
"Cola Baby"	2015	—	—N/a	Non-album singles
"Are You With Me?"	2017	—	—N/a	Non-album singles
"—" denotes releases that did not chart or were not released in that region.

==== Soundtrack appearances ====
Title	Year	Peak chart positions	Sales (DL)	Album
Title	Year	KOR	Sales (DL)	Album
"Foolish Love"	2009	—	—N/a	Cain and Abel OST
"The Sound Of Memory"	2010	—	—N/a	Road No. 1 OST
"—" denotes releases that did not chart or were not released in that region.

== Bibliography ==
Year	Title	Publisher	Notes
2010	So Ji-sub's Journey	Sallim	photo-essays
2011	Only You with So Ji-sub	51K	photo-essays
2012	SONICe Vol. 1	51K & CJ E&M	magazine

== Accolades ==
=== Awards and nominations ===
Name of the award ceremony, year presented, category, nominee of the award, and the result of the nomination
Award ceremony	Year	Category	Nominee / Work	Result	Ref.
APAN Star Awards	2012	Excellence Award, Actor	Phantom	Nominated	
APAN Star Awards	2013	Top Excellence Award, Actor	Master's Sun	Nominated	
Asian Film Awards	2009	Best Newcomer	Rough Cut	Nominated	
Baeksang Arts Awards	2001	Best New Actor – Television	Wang Rung's Land	Nominated	
Baeksang Arts Awards	2004	Most Popular Actor – Television	Something Happened in Bali	Won	
Baeksang Arts Awards	2005	Best Actor – Television	I'm Sorry, I Love You	Won	
Baeksang Arts Awards	2009	Best New Actor – Film	Rough Cut	Won	
Baeksang Arts Awards	2010	Best Actor – Television	Cain and Abel	Nominated	
Best Jeanist Awards	2008	Best Jeanist, International Category	So Ji-sub	Won	
Blue Dragon Film Awards	2008	Best New Actor	Rough Cut	Won	
Buil Film Awards	2009	Best Dressed	So Ji-sub	Won	
Buil Film Awards	2009	Best New Actor	Rough Cut	Won	
Busan Film Critics Awards	2009	Best New Actor	Rough Cut	Won	
Donga TV Korea Lifestyle Awards	2010	Best Dressed Male of the Year	So Ji-sub	Won	
Fashion Model Awards	2001	Ms. & Mr. Davidoff Award	So Ji-sub	Won	
Fundex Awards	2026	Best Actor of TV Drama	Agent Kim Reactivated	Pending	
Grand Bell Awards	2009	Best New Actor	Rough Cut	Nominated	
Grand Bell Awards	2010	Achievement in Cultural Exchange	So Ji-sub	Won	
Grimae Awards	2009	Best Actor	Cain and Abel	Won	
KBS Drama Awards	2004	Best Couple Award	So Ji-sub (with Im Soo-jung); I'm Sorry, I Love You	Won	
KBS Drama Awards	2004	Excellence Award, Actor	I'm Sorry, I Love You	Won	
KBS Drama Awards	2004	Netizen Award	I'm Sorry, I Love You	Won	
KBS Drama Awards	2004	Popularity Award	I'm Sorry, I Love You	Won	
KBS Drama Awards	2015	Grand Prize (Daesang)	Oh My Venus	Nominated	
KBS Drama Awards	2015	Top Excellence Award, Actor	Oh My Venus	Won	
KBS Drama Awards	2015	Excellence Award, Actor in a Miniseries	Oh My Venus	Nominated	
KBS Drama Awards	2015	Netizen Award	Oh My Venus	Nominated	
KBS Drama Awards	2015	Best Couple Award	So Ji-sub (with Shin Min-a); Oh My Venus	Won	
Korea Broadcasting Grand Prix Award	2009	Actor of the Year in Broadcasting	Cain and Abel	Won	
Korea Drama Awards	2012	Top Excellence Award, Actor	Phantom	Nominated	
Korea Drama Awards	2016	Top Excellence Award, Actor	Oh My Venus	Nominated	
Korean Association of Film Critics Awards	2008	Best Actor	Rough Cut	Won	
Korean Culture and Entertainment Awards	2011	Grand Prize (Daesang) for Film	Always	Won	
Korean Film Awards	2008	Best Actor	Rough Cut	Nominated	
MBC Drama Awards	2018	Bromance Award	So Ji-sub (with Son Ho-jun and Kang Ki-young); My Secret Terrius	Won	
MBC Drama Awards	2018	Grand Prize (Daesang)	My Secret Terrius	Won	
MBC Drama Awards	2018	Top Excellence Award, Actor in a Wednesday-Thursday Drama	My Secret Terrius	Won	
MBC Drama Awards	2022	Grand Prize (Daesang)	Doctor Lawyer	Nominated	
MBC Drama Awards	2022	Top Excellence Award, Actor in a Miniseries	Doctor Lawyer	Nominated	
New York Asian Film Festival	2009	Rising Star Asia Award	Rough Cut	Won	
SBS Drama Awards	2000	Best New Actor	Joa, Joa, Cheers for the Women, Wang Rung's Land	Won	
SBS Drama Awards	2003	Excellence Award, Actor in a Special Planning Drama	Thousand Years of Love	Won	
SBS Drama Awards	2003	Top 10 Stars	Thousand Years of Love	Won	
SBS Drama Awards	2004	Top Excellence Award, Actor	Something Happened in Bali	Nominated	
SBS Drama Awards	2004	Excellence Award, Actor in a Drama Special	Something Happened in Bali	Nominated	
SBS Drama Awards	2009	Top 10 Stars	Cain and Abel	Won	
SBS Drama Awards	2009	Top Excellence Award, Actor	Cain and Abel	Won	
SBS Drama Awards	2012	Top 10 Stars	Phantom	Won	
SBS Drama Awards	2012	Top Excellence Award, Actor in a Drama Special	Phantom	Won	
SBS Drama Awards	2013	Top 10 Stars	Master's Sun	Won	
SBS Drama Awards	2013	Top Excellence Award, Actor in a Miniseries	Master's Sun	Won	
Style Icon Awards	2010	International Style Icon	So Ji-sub	Won	

=== Honors ===
Name of country or organization, year given, and name of honor or award
Country or organization	Year	Honor / Award	Ref.
Korea Tourism Organization	2011	Special Achievement Award	
National Tax Service	2018	Beautiful Taxpayer	

=== Listicles ===
Name of publisher, year listed, name of listicle, and placement
Publisher	Year	Listicle	Placement	Ref.
Forbes	2010	Korea Power Celebrity	35th	
Forbes	2012	Korea Power Celebrity	21st	
