= Brilliant Legacy =

2009 South Korean television series

- Also known as: Shining Inheritance
- Hangul: 찬란한 유산
- Hanja: 燦爛한 遺產
- RR: Challanhan yusan
- MR: Ch'allanhan yusan
- Genre: Melodrama; Romance; Family
- Created by: SBS Drama
- Written by: So Hyun-kyung
- Directed by: Jin Hyuk
- Starring: Han Hyo-joo; Lee Seung-gi; Moon Chae-won; Bae Soo-bin
- Opening theme: "Only You" by Kang Ha-ni
- Composer: Changyeop Jeon
- Country of origin: South Korea
- Original language: Korean
- No. of episodes: 28

Production
- Executive producer: Huh Woong
- Producers: Kim Jong-sik; Kim Hee-yeol
- Running time: 1 hr 10 min
- Production company: Pan Entertainment

Original release
- Network: SBS
- Release: April 25 – July 26, 2009

Brilliant Legacy (Korean: 찬란한 유산), also known as Shining Inheritance, is a 2009 South Korean television series starring Han Hyo-joo, Lee Seung-gi, Moon Chae-won, and Bae Soo-bin. It aired on SBS in 28 episodes from April 25 to July 26, 2009 on Saturdays and Sundays at 21:45.

It was among the top-rated Korean dramas of the year; it maintained its number one spot in the viewership ratings chart for 20 consecutive weeks and reached a peak rating of 47.1% for its last episode. The series is commonly known as the star-making vehicle of popular Hallyu stars Han Hyo-joo and Lee Seung-gi, and is credited with launching their careers into the household names they are today.

== Synopsis ==
Go Eun-sung (Han Hyo-joo) was studying overseas in New York and returned to Korea for a vacation and to take her autistic brother, Eun-woo (Yeon Joon-seok), to the United States to study music. Sunwoo Hwan (Lee Seung-gi), who was also studying in New York, was ordered to return to Korea by his grandmother, Jang Sook-ja (Ban Hyo-jung), to learn how to manage her food company. Eun-sung and Hwan, who were on the same flight back home, accidentally had their bags exchanged, which led to several misunderstandings between the two.

Go Pyung-joong (Jeon In-taek), Eun-sung's father, was struggling to save his company from going bankrupt. One day, his wallet and valuables were stolen by a thief who subsequently died in a gas explosion accident. Upon finding Pyung-joong's belongings on the thief, the police mistakenly identified the thief as him and a death certificate for Pyung-joong was promptly issued. He decided to lie low and not tell his family that he was alive so that his family could claim his life insurance money and use it to clear the debts. However, his second wife, Baek Sung-hee (Kim Mi-sook), kicked her stepchildren, Eun-sung and Eun-woo, out of the house after collecting the insurance money and moved into a new home with her daughter, Yoo Seung-mi (Moon Chae-won). Seung-mi was also Hwan's longtime best friend, hoping to be something more.

Eun-sung asked for help from several of her friends, including Hyung-jin, who avoided her because she was no longer rich. She managed to find a job at a nightclub with the help of her friend, Hye-ri. At the nightclub, Eun-sung met Hyung-jin's upperclassman, Park Joon-se (Bae Soo-bin), who was shocked to see her working there. She also met Hwan, who caused her to lose contact with Eun-woo. Realizing that Eun-woo was missing, Eun-sung was devastated and tried searching for her brother but to no avail. With the help of Hye-ri and Joon-se, Eun-sung rented a small room and started a small dumpling stall while continuing her search for Eun-woo.

Meanwhile, Sook-ja became deeply disappointed in her grandson as Hwan had no direction in life and did not know how to cherish her company and employees. While pondering over what to do about her grandson, Sook-ja visited a neighborhood that she used to live in when she was poor and encountered Eun-sung, who was selling dumplings. Sook-ja had an accident and received help from Eun-sung. Seeing that Eun-sung had tried her best to take care of her even when she could not afford her own daily expenses, Sook-ja was touched by Eun-sung's compassion. She brought Eun-sung home, then announced to her family that Eun-sung was going to live with them and that she was going to appoint Eun-sung as the heir of her food company, if she could raise the profits of the sinking second branch by 20%.

== Cast ==
=== Main cast ===
- Han Hyo-joo as Go Eun-sung
- Lee Seung-gi as Sunwoo Hwan

==== Go family ====
- Jeon In-taek as Go Pyung-joong (father)
- Kim Mi-sook as Baek Sung-hee (stepmother)
- Moon Chae-won as Yoo Seung-mi (stepsister)
- Yeon Joon-seok as Go Eun-woo (younger brother)

==== Sunwoo family ====
- Ban Hyo-jung as Jang Sook-ja (grandmother)
- Yu Ji-in as Oh Young-ran (mother)
- Han Ye-won as Sunwoo Jung (younger sister)
- Lee Seung-hyung as Pyo Sung-chul

==== Park family ====
- Bae Soo-bin as Park Joon-se
- Choi Jung-woo as Park Tae-soo (father)

==== Extended cast ====
- Min Young-won as Lee Hye-ri (Eun-sung's friend)
- Jung Suk-won as Jin Young-seok (Hwan's friend)
- Son Yeo-eun as Jung In-young (Eun-sung and Seung-mi's friend)
- Kim Jae-seung as Lee Hyung-jin (Joon-se's junior colleague)
- Baek Seung-hyeon as Lee Joon-young / Manager Lee (store manager)
- Park Sang-hyun as Han Soo-jae (store worker)
- Kim Sung-oh as Seon Woo Hwan's friend (Ep.7)

== Original soundtrack ==
1. Only You (너 하나만) – Kang Ha-ni (Opening Title)
2. The Person Living in My Heart (내 가슴에 사는 사람) – Isu
3. Crazy in Love (사랑에 미쳐서) – Ji-sun
4. Love is Punishment (사랑은 벌이다) – K.Will
5. Spring Rain – Ji-hye
6. Dear Sister (그리운 누나)
7. Catch Hwan (환이를 잡아라)
8. Are We Family? (우리가 가족이니?)
9. Funny Life
10. The Road Leading to You (너에게 가는 길)
11. Smile Working
12. Last Lie (마지막 거짓말)
13. Bickering (티격태격)
14. Memories of Separation (이별의 기억)
15. Spring Rain (Guitar Ver.)
16. Destiny, the Second Story (운명, 그 두번째 이야기)

== Ratings ==
In this table, the blue numbers represent the lowest ratings and the red numbers represent the highest ratings.

Date	Episode	Nationwide	Seoul
April 25, 2009	1	15.9% (5th)	15.8% (5th)
April 26, 2009	2	19.6% (4th)	19.4% (4th)
May 2, 2009	3	17.9% (2nd)	18.8% (2nd)
May 3, 2009	4	23.2% (1st)	23.9% (1st)
May 9, 2009	5	22.8% (1st)	23.8% (1st)
May 10, 2009	6	26.9% (1st)	27.6% (1st)
May 16, 2009	7	25.1% (1st)	25.4% (1st)
May 17, 2009	8	28.1% (1st)	29.1% (1st)
May 23, 2009	9	27.2% (1st)	27.8% (1st)
May 24, 2009	10	28.8% (1st)	30.2% (1st)
May 30, 2009	11	27.2% (1st)	28.4% (1st)
May 31, 2009	12	32.0% (1st)	34.2% (1st)
June 6, 2009	13	30.0% (1st)	30.8% (1st)
June 7, 2009	14	32.4% (1st)	33.5% (1st)
June 13, 2009	15	30.6% (1st)	31.5% (1st)
June 14, 2009	16	33.4% (1st)	33.9% (1st)
June 20, 2009	17	32.8% (1st)	33.5% (1st)
June 21, 2009	18	34.6% (1st)	34.6% (1st)
June 27, 2009	19	33.3% (1st)	33.8% (1st)
June 28, 2009	20	38.4% (1st)	38.8% (1st)
July 4, 2009	21	35.7% (1st)	35.6% (1st)
July 5, 2009	22	39.0% (1st)	38.5% (1st)
July 11, 2009	23	37.2% (1st)	37.2% (1st)
July 12, 2009	24	41.3% (1st)	41.2% (1st)
July 18, 2009	25	39.3% (1st)	39.0% (1st)
July 19, 2009	26	42.2% (1st)	42.8% (1st)
July 25, 2009	27	40.5% (1st)	39.9% (1st)
July 26, 2009	28	45.2% (1st)	46.0% (1st)
Average		31.5%	32.0%

Source: TNS Media Korea

== Awards and nominations ==
Year	Award	Category	Recipient	Result
2009	3rd Mnet 20's Choice Awards	Hot Male Drama Star	Lee Seung-gi	Won
2009	3rd Mnet 20's Choice Awards	Hot Female Drama Star	Han Hyo-joo	Won
2009	SBS Drama Awards	Top Excellence Award, Actress	Kim Mi-sook	Won
2009	SBS Drama Awards	Excellence Award, Actor in a Special Planning Drama	Lee Seung-gi	Won
2009	SBS Drama Awards	Excellence Award, Actor in a Special Planning Drama	Bae Soo-bin	Nominated
2009	SBS Drama Awards	Excellence Award, Actress in a Special Planning Drama	Kim Mi-sook	Nominated
2009	SBS Drama Awards	Excellence Award, Actress in a Special Planning Drama	Han Hyo-joo	Won
2009	SBS Drama Awards	Best Supporting Actor in a Special Planning Drama	Lee Seung-hyung	Nominated
2009	SBS Drama Awards	Best Supporting Actress in a Special Planning Drama	Yu Ji-in	Nominated
2009	SBS Drama Awards	Top 10 Stars	Han Hyo-joo	Won
2009	SBS Drama Awards	Top 10 Stars	Lee Seung-gi	Won
2009	SBS Drama Awards	Top 10 Stars	Bae Soo-bin	Won
2009	SBS Drama Awards	Best Couple	Lee Seung-gi and Han Hyo-joo	Won
2009	SBS Drama Awards	Achievement Award	Ban Hyo-jung	Won
2010	46th Baeksang Arts Awards	Best Drama	Brilliant Legacy	Nominated
2010	46th Baeksang Arts Awards	Best Actress (TV)	Han Hyo-joo	Nominated
2010	46th Baeksang Arts Awards	Best New Director (TV)	Jin Hyuk	Nominated
2010	46th Baeksang Arts Awards	Best New Actor (TV)	Lee Seung-gi	Nominated
2010	46th Baeksang Arts Awards	Best Screenplay (TV)	So Hyun-kyung	Nominated
2010	46th Baeksang Arts Awards	Most Popular Actor (TV)	Lee Seung-gi	Won
2010	37th Korea Broadcasting Awards	Best Serial Drama	Brilliant Legacy	Won
2010	5th Seoul International Drama Awards	Outstanding Korean Actress	Han Hyo-joo	Won
2010	5th Seoul International Drama Awards	Most Popular Actor	Lee Seung-gi	Won
2011	44th WorldFest-Houston International Film Festival	Platinum Remi Award	Brilliant Legacy	Won
2011	17th Shanghai Television Festival Magnolia Awards	Foreign TV Series Special Award	Brilliant Legacy	Won

== Adaptation ==
A Chinese remake called My Splendid Life (我的灿烂人生 Wo De Can Lan Ren Sheng) aired in 2011, on Dragon TV. A Turkish remake titled Don't Let Go of My Hand (Elimi Bırakma) aired in 2018, on TRT 1. A Philippine adaptation titled Shining Inheritance has premiere in 2024, on GMA Network.
