= 2009 SBS Drama Awards =

17th edition of award ceremony

- Date: December 31, 2009
- Site: SBS Open Hall, Deungchon-dong, Seoul
- Hosted by: Jang Keun-suk; Moon Geun-young; Park Sun-young

Television coverage
- Network: SBS

The 2009 SBS Drama Awards is a ceremony honoring the best performances in television on the SBS network for the year 2009. It was held on December 31, 2009, at the SBS Open Hall in Deungchon-dong, Seoul, and was hosted by actor Jang Keun-suk, actress Moon Geun-young and announcer Park Sun-young.

== Nominees and winners ==
Complete list of nominees and winners:

Grand Prize (Daesang)	Achievement Award
Jang Seo-hee - Temptation of Wife as Goo Eun-jae/Min So-hee	Ban Hyo-jung - Brilliant Legacy
Top Excellence Award, Actor	Top Excellence Award, Actress
So Ji-sub - Cain and Abel as Lee Cho-in/Oh Kang-ho; Bae Soo-bin - Temptation of an Angel as Shin Hyun-woo/Ahn Jae-sung; Jun Kwang-ryul - Swallow the Sun as Jang Min-ho/Kim Il-hwan	Kim Mi-sook - Brilliant Legacy as Baek Sung-hee; Jang Seo-hee - Temptation of Wife as Goo Eun-jae/Min So-hee; Kim Hye-soo - Style as Park Ki-ja
Excellence Award, Actor in a Drama Special	Excellence Award, Actress in a Drama Special
Cha Seung-won - City Hall as Jo Gook; Jang Keun-suk - You're Beautiful as Hwang Tae-kyung; Ji Sung - Swallow the Sun as Kim Jung-woo; Ryu Si-won - Style as Seo Woo-jin; Shin Hyun-joon - Cain and Abel as Lee Seon-woo	Kim Sun-a - City Hall as Shin Mi-rae; Choi Ji-woo - Star's Lover as Lee Ma-ri; Han Ji-min - Cain and Abel as Oh Young-ji; Lee Ji-ah - Style as Lee Seo-jung; Park Shin-hye - You're Beautiful as Go Mi-nyeo/Go Mi-nam
Excellence Award, Actor in a Special Planning Drama	Excellence Award, Actress in a Special Planning Drama
Lee Seung-gi - Brilliant Legacy as Sunwoo Hwan; Park Si-hoo - Family's Honor as Lee Kang-suk; Bae Soo-bin - Brilliant Legacy as Park Joon-se; Choi Bool-am - Smile, You as Kang Man-bok; Jung Kyung-ho - Smile, You as Kang Hyun-soo	Han Hyo-joo - Brilliant Legacy as Go Eun-sung; Lee Min-jung - Smile, You as Seo Jung-in; Lee So-yeon - Temptation of an Angel as Joo Ah-ran; Kim Mi-sook - Brilliant Legacy as Baek Sung-hee; Yoon Jung-hee - Family's Honor as Ha Dan-ah
Excellence Award, Actor in a Serial Drama	Excellence Award, Actress in a Serial Drama
Byun Woo-min - Temptation of Wife as Jung Gyo-bin; Ahn Jae-mo - Innocent You as Kang Ji-hwan; Jung Gyu-woon - Loving You a Thousand Times as Baek Kang-ho; Kim Ho-jin - Two Wives as Kang Chul-soo; Park Geun-hyung - Glass Castle as Kim Doo-hyung	Kim Seo-hyung - Temptation of Wife as Shin Ae-ri; Jung Ryeo-won - Ja Myung Go as Princess Jamyung; Lee Soo-kyung - Loving You a Thousand Times as Go Eun-nim; Kim Ji-young - Two Wives as Yoon Young-hee
Best Supporting Actor in a Drama Special	Best Supporting Actress in a Drama Special
Baek Seung-hyeon - Cain and Abel as Choi Chi-soo; Kim In-kwon - You're Beautiful as Ma Hoon-yi; Lee Hyung-chul - City Hall as Lee Jung-do; Oh Dal-su - Dream as Lee Young-chul; Yu Oh-seong - Swallow the Sun as Jackson Lee	Na Young-hee - Style as Son Myung-hee; Choi Ran - You're Beautiful as Go Mi-ja, Swallow the Sun as Choi In-sook; Chu Sang-mi - City Hall as Min Joo-hwa; Kim Hae-sook - Cain and Abel as Na Hye-joo; Yoon Se-ah - City Hall as Go Go-hae
Best Supporting Actor in a Special Planning Drama	Best Supporting Actress in a Special Planning Drama
Kang Seok-woo - Smile, You as Seo Jung-gil; Han Jin-hee - Temptation of an Angel as Shin Woo-sub; Kim Sung-min - Family's Honor as Ha Tae-young; Lee Chun-hee - Smile, You as Seo Sung-joon; Lee Seung-hyung - Brilliant Legacy as Pyo Sung-chul	Cha Hwa-yeon - Temptation of an Angel as Jo Kyung-hee; Maya - Family's Honor as Na Mal-soon; Song Ok-sook - Smile, You as Baek Geum-ja; Yu Ji-in - Brilliant Legacy as Oh Young-ran
Best Supporting Actor in a Serial Drama	Best Supporting Actress in a Serial Drama
Choi Jun-yong - Temptation of Wife as Goo Kang-jae; Jang Hyun-sung - Glass Castle as Kim Gyu-sung; Kang Ji-sub - Two Wives as Song Ji-ho; Kang Nam-gil - Innocent You as Kang Jung-yong; Ryu Jin - Loving You a Thousand Times as Baek Sae-hoon	Lee Hwi-hyang - Loving You a Thousand Times as Son Hyang-sook, Innocent You as Yoon Soon-hee; Geum Bo-ra - Temptation of Wife as Baek Mi-in; Kim Hye-ok - Don't Hesitate as Cha Young-ran; Sung Hyun-ah - Ja Myung Go as Song Maesolsoo; Yang Jung-a - Glass Castle as Oh Yoo-ran
Producer's Award	Best Young Actor/Actress
Yoon Jung-hee - Family's Honor as Ha Dan-ah; Jung Kyung-ho - Ja Myung Go as Prince Hodong, Smile, You as Kang Hyun-soo	Jung Yun-seok - Temptation of Wife as Jung Ni-no; Kim Su-jung - Two Wives as Han So-ri
Best Couple Award	Netizen Popularity Award
Lee Seung-gi and Han Hyo-joo - Brilliant Legacy; Cha Seung-won and Kim Sun-a - City Hall; Choi Jun-yong and Oh Young-shil - Temptation of Wife; Jang Keun-suk and Park Shin-hye - You're Beautiful; Ji Sung and Sung Yu-ri - Swallow the Sun; Jung Gyu-woon and Lee Soo-kyung - Loving You a Thousand Times; Jung Kyung-ho and Lee Min-jung - Smile, You; Ryu Si-won and Kim Hye-soo - Style; So Ji-sub and Han Ji-min - Cain and Abel; Yoo Ji-tae and Choi Ji-woo - Star's Lover	Jang Keun-suk - You're Beautiful as Hwang Tae-kyung

== Top 10 Stars ==
- Bae Soo-bin - Brilliant Legacy
- Cha Seung-won - City Hall
- Han Hyo-joo - Brilliant Legacy
- Jang Keun-suk - You're Beautiful
- Jang Seo-hee - Temptation of Wife
- Kim Hye-soo - Style
- Kim Sun-a - City Hall
- Lee Seung-gi - Brilliant Legacy
- Lee Soo-kyung - Loving You a Thousand Times
- So Ji-sub - Cain and Abel

== New Star Award ==
- Jin Tae-hyun - Temptation of an Angel
- Jung Gyu-woon - Loving You a Thousand Times
- Jung Yong-hwa - You're Beautiful
- Kim Bum - Dream
- Lee Hong-gi - You're Beautiful
- Lee Min-jung - Smile, You
- Lee So-yeon - Temptation of an Angel
- Lee Tae-im - Don't Hesitate
- Lee Yong-woo - Style
- Oh Young-shil - Temptation of Wife
- Park Shin-hye - You're Beautiful
- Son Dam-bi - Dream
