= Mercy for None =

2025 South Korean television series

- Promotional poster
- Hangul: 광장
- Hanja: 廣場
- Lit.: Square
- RR: Gwangjang
- MR: Kwangjang
- Genre: Action; Noir; Revenge drama
- Based on: Plaza Wars: Mercy for None by: Oh Se-hyung; Kim Gyun-tae
- Written by: Yoo Ki-seong
- Directed by: Choi Sung-eun
- Starring: So Ji-sub; Huh Joon-ho; Ahn Gil-kang; Lee Beom-soo; Gong Myung; Choo Young-woo; Jo Han-chul
- Music by: Dalpalan
- Country of origin: South Korea
- Original language: Korean
- No. of episodes: 7

Production
- Running time: 37–49 minutes
- Production companies: Yong Film; Studio N

Original release
- Network: Netflix
- Release: June 6, 2025

Mercy for None (Korean: 광장) is a 2025 South Korean action noir television series written by Yoo Ki-seong, directed by Choi Sung-eun, and starring So Ji-sub, Huh Joon-ho, Ahn Gil-kang, Lee Beom-soo, Gong Myung, Choo Young-woo, and Jo Han-chul. It was released on Netflix on June 6, 2025.

== Synopsis ==
Nam Gi-jun, a former criminal gang enforcer, leaves his brother and criminal past behind after an incident. Eleven years later, his younger brother, Nam Gi-seok, is brutally murdered, forcing Gi-jun back into the world of crime to uncover the truth and seek brutal revenge on those responsible.

== Cast and characters ==
=== Main ===
- So Ji-sub as Nam Gi-jun

A former top enforcer of the Joowoon organisation, he severed his Achilles tendon and left to make peace with the opposing gang, but returned after 11 years due to his younger brother Gi-seok's death.

- Huh Joon-ho as Lee Joo-woon

The head of Joowoon.

- Ahn Gil-kang as Gu Bong-san

The head of Bongsan, a rival organisation of Joowoon.

- Lee Beom-soo as Sim Sung-won

The CEO of N.Clean, a trauma cleaning company.

- Gong Myung as Gu Jun-mo

Bong-san's son who is expected to take over the reins of Bongsan from his father.

- Choo Young-woo as Lee Geum-son

Joo-woon's son who is a prosecutor.

- Jo Han-chul as Choi Sung-cheol

A director of Joowoon, and Joo-woon's capable assistant.

=== Supporting ===
==== Joowoon ====
- Jung Gun-joo as Chun Hae-bum

Gi-seok's assistant.

==== Bongsan ====
- Ahn Se-ho as Kim Chun-seok

A department head of Bongsan. Formerly under Joowoon, he betrayed the organisation to join Bongsan.

- Kang Shin-hyo as Hong Hyun-seok

A director of Bongsan.

==== Others ====
- Ji Yi-soo as a female employee of N.Clean
- Kim Hak-sun as Han Seok-yoon

The chief of the Investigation Unit of the Seoul Metropolitan Police Agency.

- Ku Sung-hwan as a detective of the Seoul Metropolitan Police Agency
- Lee Sang-hee as a lawyer
- Lee Ki-young as a doctor of Taekwang Clinic
- Lee Jae-yoon as Kaneyama / Kim Gil-rok

A Zainichi Korean contract killer.

- Kim Tae-in as Jung In-seok

A former MMA champion who was recruited by Jun-mo.

- Don Mills as Hyung-jin

A fighter who accompanied In-seok.

=== Special appearances ===
- Cha Seung-won as Cha Yeong-do / Mr. Kim

A person who exists for the coexistence of Joowoon and Bongsan organisations. He is a superintendent of the Seoul Metropolitan Police Agency.

- Lee Joon-hyuk as Nam Gi-seok

Gi-jun's younger brother, and the second-in-charge of Joowoon. He was brutally murdered, which led to Gi-jun's road of revenge.

== Episodes ==
No.	Title	Directed by	Written by	Original release date
1	"Episode 1"	Choi Sung-eon	Yoo Ki-seong	June 6, 2025
2	"Episode 2"	Choi Sung-eon	Yoo Ki-seong	June 6, 2025
3	"Episode 3"	Choi Sung-eon	Yoo Ki-seong	June 6, 2025
4	"Episode 4"	Choi Sung-eon	Yoo Ki-seong	June 6, 2025
5	"Episode 5"	Choi Sung-eon	Yoo Ki-seong	June 6, 2025
6	"Episode 6"	Choi Sung-eon	Yoo Ki-seong	June 6, 2025
7	"Episode 7"	Choi Sung-eon	Yoo Ki-seong	June 6, 2025

== Production ==
=== Development ===
The series is based on the webtoon Plaza Wars: Mercy for None by Oh Se-hyung and Kim Geun-tae. It is directed by Choi Sung-eun, written by Yoo Ki-seong, and produced by Yong film and Studio N.

=== Casting ===
In February 2023, So Ji-sub was cast to appear as the lead in the series. In July, Gong Myung was cast and positively reviewing the script. In August, Lee Joon-hyuk, Huh Joon-ho, Lee Beom-soo, Ahn Se-ho, and Ahn Gil-kang were cast with the former making a special appearance.

=== Filming ===
Principal photography began in the second half of 2023.

== Release ==
The series was released on Netflix on June 6, 2025.

== Reception ==
On the review aggregator website Rotten Tomatoes, 88% of 8 critics' reviews are positive, with an average rating of 7.6/10.
