= Temptation of an Angel =

- Promotional poster
- Also known as: Angel's Temptation
- Genre: Melodrama; Suspense; Erotica drama
- Written by: Kim Soon-ok
- Directed by: Son Jung-hyun; Cho Young-kwang
- Starring: Bae Soo-bin; Lee So-yeon; Jin Tae-hyun; Hong Soo-hyun
- Composers: Moon Dae-hyun; Kim Hyun-jong
- Country of origin: South Korea
- Original language: Korean
- No. of episodes: 21

Production
- Production location: South Korea
- Running time: 70 minutes
- Production company: Samhwa Networks

Original release
- Network: SBS TV
- Release: October 12 – December 22, 2009

Related
- Temptation of Wife

Temptation of an Angel (Korean: 천사의 유혹; RR: Cheonsaui yuhok) is a 2009 South Korean television series starring Bae Soo-bin, Lee So-yeon, Jin Tae-hyun and Hong Soo-hyun. It aired from October 12 to December 22, 2009, on SBS TV's Mondays and Tuesdays at 20:50 (KST). This drama was a male version of another series, Temptation of Wife. Bae Soo-bin and Lee So-yeon reunited onscreen on the MBC television series Dong Yi, less than a year after the show ended.

== Synopsis ==
Joo Ah-ran (Lee So-yeon) and Shin Hyun-woo (Han Sang-jin / Bae Soo-bin) have an elaborate wedding at a luxurious hotel. Shin Hyun-woo sincerely loves Joo Ah-ran, but Joo Ah-ran has ulterior motives for the marriage. Joo Ah-ran's family was destroyed by Shin Hyun-woo's parents and, because of this, she is marrying Shin Hyun-woo in a secret plan to exact revenge.

Sometime after their marriage, Shin Hyun-woo is involved in a horrible car accident, leaving him in a coma. Once Shin Hyun-woo awakes from his coma, he learns of Joo Ah-ran's revenge plot and then sets out on his own path for revenge.

== Cast ==
=== Main ===
- Lee So-yeon as Joo Ah-ran

Wife of Shin Hyun-woo. A furniture designer who married the son of Soul Furniture's owners. She once had an ordinary and happy childhood. But when she lost her parents, she became orphan who went through life's hardships. To avenge her parents' death, she got herself married into the family she believed have led to her parents' death. Growing up as an orphan, she devised a plan to make Hyun-woo fall for her and manipulating him into marrying her as his wife. She started destroying her husband's family thereafter. Ah-ran possesses extreme tenacity and fast thinking. Despite the loss of her parents, she still has an aunt and uncle and even a sister who was put up for adoption.

- Han Sang-jin as Shin Hyun-woo (before plastic surgery)

He was the chief of design department in Soul Furniture, a furniture company owned by his parents. He has soft personality. He's a sweetheart with a romantic sense. Despite his family's objections, Hyun-woo married the woman of his dreams, Ah-ran. His life changed after he was betrayed by the very woman he loved, which led him to a horrific car accident that altered his life forever.

- Bae Soo-bin as Shin Hyun-woo / Ahn Jae-sung (after plastic surgery) - After regaining consciousness, he became totally different person, vowing revenge to his wife. Undergoing plastic surgery, he became a physically attractive man, possessing an image of both an angel and a demon.
- Jin Tae-hyun as Nam Joo-seung - Joo Ah-ran's lover. He is a person who has secrets of his own. Joo-seung works as a doctor during the day and works as a lounge singer at a jazz café at night. His father was the secretary of Mr. Shin, who the younger Nam now works for as the family doctor. He has no physical prowess, but has a strong eyesight, in addition to having a very strong charisma.
- Hong Soo-hyun as Yoon Jae-hee / Joo Kyeong-ran
  - Park Ha-young as young Jae-hee

She grew up not knowing who her parents are. She has a bright and optimistic viewpoint on the world. As a child, she dreamed of becoming a nurse who takes care of the poor. Even when she was growing up in the orphanage, she took care of younger children like a big sister. Rather than thinking she was abandoned by her real parents, she believed that it was enough that she was given the love and care from the people of the orphanage. Little did she know that her real parents have died and her sister is still alive, which turns out to be Joo Ah-ran.

=== Supporting ===
- Jung Gyu-su as Joo Ah-ran's father
- Kang Yu-mi as Kim Yeon-jae
- Han Jin-hee as Shin Woo-sub
- Cha Hwa-yeon as Jo Kyung-hee
- Kim Dong-keon as Shin Hyun-min
- Jin Ye-sol as Shin Hyun-ji
- Sung Chang-hoon as Secretary Kang
- Choi Ji-na as Jung Sang-ah / Julie Jung
- Lee Jong-hyuk as Jung Sang-mo
- Lee Mi-young as Jae-hee's aunt
- Jung Gyu-soo as Jae-hee's uncle
- Ahn Nae-sang as detective (ep. 15-16)
- Oh Dae-gyu as fake Hyun-woo (ep. 15)
- Lee Jae-hwang as Ahn Jae-sung (cameo)
- Kim Ho-chang as the journalist
- Lee Sol-gu as the money lender
- Son Hyun-joo
- Kim Sung-oh

== Ratings ==
Ep.	Original broadcast date	Average audience share			
Ep.	Original broadcast date	Nielsen Korea		TNmS	
Ep.	Original broadcast date	Nationwide	Seoul	Nationwide	Seoul
1	October 12, 2009	10.0%	10.2%	10.3%	10.9%
2	October 13, 2009	10.6%	10.7%	11.0%	11.5%
3	October 19, 2009	11.5%	10.9%	11.3%	11.6%
4	October 26, 2009	11.2%	10.9%	12.1%	12.7%
5	October 27, 2009	12.8%	12.8%	13.9%	14.2%
6	November 2, 2009	14.8%	14.4%	15.9%	16.5%
7	November 3, 2009	17.0%	16.9%	16.6%	17.2%
8	November 9, 2009	15.2%	15.8%	16.4%	16.8%
9	November 10, 2009	18.3%	18.2%	17.9%	17.4%
10	November 16, 2009	17.5%	17.6%	19.6%	20.0%
11	November 17, 2009	18.5%	19.0%	18.3%	19.0%
12	November 23, 2009	18.3%	18.7%	18.6%	18.9%
13	November 24, 2009	20.4%	20.7%	19.6%	20.0%
14	November 30, 2009	17.2%	16.7%	19.8%	20.3%
15	December 1, 2009	19.1%	19.0%	21.5%	22.1%
16	December 7, 2009	19.6%	19.5%	21.8%	22.8%
17	December 8, 2009	22.6%	22.7%	23.2%	23.7%
18	December 14, 2009	20.6%	21.3%	22.7%	23.2%
19	December 15, 2009	20.1%	20.1%	22.2%	22.6%
20	December 21, 2009	20.0%	21.1%	20.7%	21.4%
21	December 22, 2009	20.5%	21.1%	22.9%	23.6%
Average		16.9%	17.0%	17.9%	18.4%
In the table above, the blue numbers represent the lowest ratings and the red numbers represent the highest ratings.

== Awards ==
2009 SBS Drama Awards

- Best Supporting Actress in a Special Planning Drama: Cha Hwa-yeon
- New Star Award: Lee So-yeon

== Notes ==
This was considered by many as a "male version" of SBS' top-rating primetime daily drama, Temptation of Wife.
