= Min Young-won =

South Korean actress (born 1984)

- Born: Jo Hyo-kyung; January 5, 1984 (age 42); South Korea
- Education: Seoul Institute of the Arts - Film
- Occupation: Actress
- Years active: 2003–present
- Agent: My Name Entertainment

Korean name
- Hangul: 조효경
- RR: Jo Hyogyeong
- MR: Cho Hyogyŏng

Stage name
- Hangul: 민영원
- RR: Min Yeongwon
- MR: Min Yŏngwŏn

Min Young-won (Korean: 민영원; born January 5, 1984), birth name Jo Hyo-kyung, is a South Korean actress. She has mostly played supporting roles in television dramas such as Boys Over Flowers and Brilliant Legacy (both in 2009).

== Filmography ==
=== Television series ===
Year	Title	Role
2003	Twenty Years Old	
2003	HDTV Literature: "The Fragrant Well"	
2007	Drama City: "Sky Lovers"	
2008	Sweet Thief	
2009	Boys Over Flowers	Lee Mi-sook
2009	Brilliant Legacy	Lee Hye-ri
2010	Prosecutor Princess	Lee Yoo-na
2010	Happiness in the Wind	Park Hwa-young
2011	City Hunter	Kim Min-hee (guest)
2012	I Need a Fairy	Jang Hee-bin
2012	Suspicious Family	Oh Soo-jung
2012	KBS Drama Special: "SOS - Save Our School"	Lee Yoo-jin
2012	Seoyoung, My Daughter	Lee Yeon-hee
2017	The King in Love	Court Lady Jo

=== Film ===
Year	Title	Role
2004	Foolish Game	Hye-ryun

=== Variety show ===
Year	Title	Notes
	M Wide News	VJ

=== Music video appearance ===
Year	Song title	Artist
2007	"Walking in the Rain"	Wonwoo
