= Baek Seung-hyeon =

South Korean actor

- Born: Baek Seung-wook; March 1, 1975 (age 51); Busan, South Korea
- Education: Chung-Ang University
- Occupation: Actor
- Years active: 2000–present

Korean name
- Hangul: 백승현
- Hanja: 白承弦
- RR: Baek Seunghyeon
- MR: Paek Sŭnghyŏn

Birth name
- Hangul: 백승욱
- RR: Baek Seunguk
- MR: Paek Sŭnguk

Baek Seung-hyeon (born Baek Seung-wook on March 1, 1975) is a South Korean actor. Baek has starred in supporting roles in television series such as Cain and Abel (2009), Brilliant Legacy (2009), and Prosecutor Princess (2010).

== Filmography ==
=== Film ===
Year	Title	Role
2004	Identification of a Man (short film)	
2004	Who's Got the Tape?	
2005	Daddy-Long-Legs	
2006	Kiss to the Last Paradise	
2012	Home Sweet Home	Detective 1
2013	A Clear Night	Hong Kang-sik
2017	The Sheriff in Town	Detective Jo (special appearance)

=== Television series ===
Year	Title	Role
2000	Joa, Joa	Yoo Hyun-duk
2000	Juliet's Man	
2001	Piano	Lee Kyung-ho's friend
2003	Honey Honey	
2003	All In	Yang Shi-bong
2004	The Age of Heroes	Min Dae-young
2004	Toji, the Land	Dul-yi
2005	Golden Apple	Hwang Sang-taek
2005	Only You	
2005	Wild Flower	Heo Jae-ki
2006	I Want to Love	Mr. Jang
2007	Surgeon Bong Dal-hee	Kim Hyun-bin
2007	Yeon Gaesomun	Munmu of Silla
2008	First Wives' Club	
2008	Iljimae	Byeon Si-wan's friend
2009	Cain and Abel	Choi Chi-soo
2009	Brilliant Legacy	Lee Joon-young
2009	Don't Hesitate	Kim Byung-soo
2009	Will It Snow for Christmas?	
2010	Prosecutor Princess	Kim Dong-seok
2010	I Am Legend	Young-nal
2010	You Don't Know Women	Kim Jin-woo
2011	Sign	Lee Chul-won (guest appearance, episodes 12-13)
2011	Midas	Chang-soo
2011	City Hunter	Park Ho-shik
2011	Lie to Me	Gong Ah-jung's blind date (cameo, episode 9)
2012	Phantom	Kang Eun-jin
2012	The Great Seer	Jeong Do-jeon
2013	Master's Sun	Choi Yoon-hee's husband (cameo, episode 3)
2013	The Suspicious Housekeeper	Manager Kim
2013	The Heirs	Secretary Jung
2013	Thrice Married Woman	Man at fortune telling house
2014	You're All Surrounded	Song Seok-won (cameo, episodes 8–9)
2014	Only Love	Lee Young-chul (cameo)
2014	Secret Door	Shin Chi-woon
2016	The Royal Gambler	Jang Hee-jae
2016	Yeah, That's How It Is	Kwon Dong-cheol
2016	Wanted	Choi Pil-gyu

== Awards and nominations ==
Year	Award	Category	Nominated work	Result
2009	SBS Drama Awards	Best Supporting Actor in a Special Planning Drama	Cain and Abel	Won
