= Cain and Abel (South Korean TV series) =

2009 South Korean action series

- Promotional poster
- Hangul: 카인과 아벨
- RR: Kaingwa Abel
- MR: K'ain'gwa Abel
- Genre: Melodrama; Action
- Written by: Park Kye-ok
- Directed by: Kim Hyung-shik
- Starring: So Ji-sub; Shin Hyun-joon; Han Ji-min; Chae Jung-an
- Music by: Choi Seung-kwon
- Country of origin: South Korea
- Original language: Korean
- No. of episodes: 20

Production
- Production locations: Cheongju, North Chungcheong Province; China
- Running time: 70 mins
- Production companies: Plan B Pictures; DIMA Entertainment

Original release
- Network: SBS TV
- Release: 18 February – 23 April 2009

Cain and Abel (Korean: 카인과 아벨) is a 2009 South Korean television series starring So Ji-sub, Shin Hyun-joon, Han Ji-min, and Chae Jung-an. It aired on SBS from February 18 to April 23, 2009 on Wednesdays and Thursdays at 21:55 (KST) for 20 episodes.

== Synopsis ==
Based on the biblical story of Adam and Eve's first two sons, Cain and Abel is about Cain's jealousy towards his brother Abel. Lee Cho-in (So Ji-sub) is a very gifted doctor who has everything that he wants whereas his older brother, Seon-woo (Shin Hyun-joon), is jealous of all the attention that Cho-in receives. Seon-woo blames his brother for taking everything good in his life away from him: getting their father's love, getting more recognition as a doctor, and for stealing the woman he loves.

== Cast ==
=== Main ===
- So Ji-sub as Lee Cho-in / Oh Kang-ho
  - Kang Yi-seok as young Cho-in
- Shin Hyun-joon as Lee Seon-woo
  - Cha Jae-dol as toddler Seon-woo
  - Jung Chan-woo as young Seon-woo
- Han Ji-min as Oh Young-ji
- Chae Jung-an as Kim Seo-yeon
  - Kim Yoo-jung as young Seo-yeon

=== Supporting ===
- Kim Hae-sook as Na Hye-joo (Seon-woo's mother)
- Jang Yong as Lee Jong-min (Seon-woo's father)
- Ha Yoo-mi as Kim Hyun-joo
- Kwon Hae-hyo as Kim Jin-geun
- Ahn Nae-sang as Jo Hyun-taek
- Yoon Ki-won as Park Soo-rak
- Baek Seung-hyeon as Choi Chi-soo
- Han Da-min as Lee Jung-min
- Park Sung-woong as Oh Kang-chul
- Choi Jae-hwan as Seo Jin-ho
- Song Jong-ho as Kang Suk-hoon
- Kim Ha-kyun as Oh In-geun
- Kim Myung-gook as Bang Tae-man
- Seo Jin-wook as Jang Young-gyu
- Han Si-yoon as Sung Jin-young
- Kang Soo-min as Yang Dong-mi
- Kang Yo-hwan as Uhm Dae-hyun
- Yoo Joo-hee as Nam Yong-tae

== Awards ==
2009 Grimae Awards

- Best Actor: So Ji-sub

2009 Ministry of Culture, Sports and Tourism

- Actor of the Year in Broadcasting: So Ji-sub

2009 SBS Drama Awards

- Top 10 Stars - So Ji-sub
- Best Supporting Actor in a Drama Special: Baek Seung-hyeon
- Top Excellence Award, Actor - So Ji-sub
