= Ban Hyo-jung =

South Korean actress (born 1942)

- Born: Ban Man-hee; November 27, 1942 (age 83); Daegu, Korea, Empire of Japan
- Occupation: Actress
- Years active: 1964–present

Korean name
- Hangul: 반만희
- Hanja: 潘蔓姬
- RR: Ban Manhui
- MR: Pan Manhŭi

Stage name
- Hangul: 반효정
- Hanja: 潘曉靜
- RR: Ban Hyojeong
- MR: Pan Hyojŏng

Ban Hyo-jung (Korean: 반효정; born November 27, 1942), birth name Ban Man-hee (반만희), is a South Korean actress. She made her acting debut in 1964 with a bit part in Shin Sang-ok's film Rice, and went on to a prolific career in television dramas.

== Filmography ==
=== Film ===
Year	Title	Role
1964	Rice	
1964	Red Scarf	
1973	At the Age of 18	
1975	Lust	
1977	You Are the Sun and I'm the Moon	
1988	Diary of King Yeonsan	
2002	The Beauty in Dream	Grandmother
2007	The Old Garden	Han Yoon-hee's mother

=== Television series ===
Year	Title	Role
1981	Jang Hui-bin	
1982	Winds and Clouds	
1982	Soon-ae	
1985	Light and Shadow	
1986	Im Illera Im Illera	
1987	Time	
1987	Land	Mrs. Yoon
1988	The Joy of Love	
1989	The Forest Never Sleeps	
1990	While You Were Dreaming	
1991	Beyond the Mountains	
1991	Kyoto City 25	
1992	Two Women	Yang Young-ja
1992	Man in Crisis	
1992	For Love	
1993	MBC Best Theater: "Manure Flower"	Mr. Kim's first wife
1993	When I Miss You	
1993	Youth Theater	
1993	Daybreak	
1994	The Tragedy of Y	
1995	Jang Nok-su	Queen Insu
1995	West Palace	
1996	Until We Can Love	
1997	When She Beckons	
1997	Beyond the Horizon	
1998	I Love You, I Love You	
1998	Eun-shil	Im Chung-ok's mother
2000	Roll of Thunder	
2000	Because of You	Park Yang-ja
2000	Three Friends	
2001	I Still Love You	Soon-mi
2001	Way of Living: Couple	Madam Yang
2002	We Are Dating Now	
2002	Dae Bak Family	
2002	The Dawn of the Empire	Queen Janghwa
2002	To Be with You	Mal-hee
2003	One Million Roses	Han Kwi-boon
2003	Lovers	Ms. Hwang
2004	Terms of Endearment	Cho Bok-sil
2004	A Second Proposal	Yang Soon-shim
2005	Dear Heaven	Mo Ran-shil
2005	My Sweetheart, My Darling	Yoo Young-soon
2005	HDTV Novel: "The Buckwheat Season"	Woman from Nonsan
2006	Thank You, My Life	Na Kyung-soon
2006	As the River Flows	Kang Hak-shil
2007	Heaven & Earth	Han Bong-rye
2007	Good Day to Love	Lee Jin-kook's mother
2007	That Woman Is Scary	
2007	Hometown Over the Hill	Han Kil-sun (until 2012)
2008	You Stole My Heart	Myung-ja
2008	Star's Lover	Lee Ma-ri's grandmother
2009	Empress Cheonchu	Queen Sinjeong
2009	The Road Home	Gook Hyo-soon
2009	Brilliant Legacy	Jang Sook-ja
2009	Creating Destiny	Jung/Lee Ok-ran
2010	Definitely Neighbors	Lee Jung-soon
2010	Pure Pumpkin Flower	Ms. Jang
2011	49 Days	Senior scheduler (cameo)
2011	Romance Town	Yoo Choon-jak
2011	My Bittersweet Life	Kim Mal-nam
2011	A Thousand Kisses	Cha Kyung-soon
2011	Brain	Hwang Young-sun
2011	Immortal Classic	Kim Hyun-myung's grandmother (cameo)
2012	Rooftop Prince	Chairman Yeo
2012	The Moon and Stars for You	Kang Pil-soon
2012	Seoyoung, My Daughter	Kim Eun-ho (guest)
2013	KBS TV Novel – "Samsaengi"	Ms. Jo, Bong Moo-ryong's mother
2013	Ugly Alert	Chairwoman Ban Hyo-jung
2013	Pots of Gold	Kim Pil-nyeo
2013	KBS TV Novel: "Eunhui"	Lee Geum-soon
2013	Goddess of Marriage	Jin Hee
2013	Melody of Love	Jo Gwi-boon
2014	Cheongdam-dong Scandal	Jang Hye-im
2014	Rosy Lovers	Ma Pil-soon
2015	Save the Family	Cha Ong-shim
2015	Second 20s	Seo Woon-hae (cameo)
2015	Oh My Venus	Lee Hong-im
2016	Memory	Kim Soon-hee
2016	Blow Breeze	Chun Kwi-ok
2017	Bravo My Life	Park Sun-jin
2018	KBS TV Novel: "Through the Waves"	Hong Ki-jun
2020	Hi Bye, Mama!	Mrs. Jung
2020	No Matter What	Jin Ok-hwang
2021	Revolutionary Sisters	Bong Ja's housekeeper
2021	Red Shoes	Choi Sook-ja
2022	It's Beautiful Now	Yoon Jung-ja
2022–2023	The Witch's Game	Ma Hyun-deok
2025	Our Golden Days	Jo Ok-rye

== Awards and nominations ==
Year	Award	Category	Nominated work	Result
1988	KBS Drama Awards	Grand Prize (Daesang)	Land	Won
2007	KBS Drama Awards	Excellence Award, Actress in a Serial Drama	Hometown Over the Hill	Nominated
2009	SBS Drama Awards	Achievement Award	Brilliant Legacy	Won
