= Bae Soo-bin =

South Korean actor (born 1976)

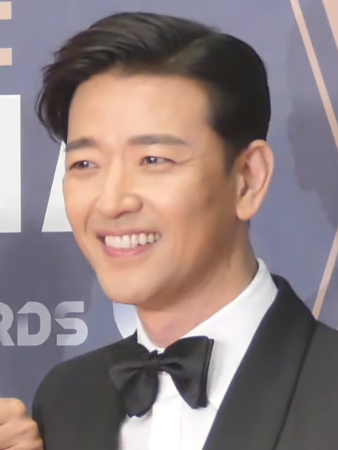
- Bae in December 2018
- Born: Yoon Tae-wook; December 9, 1976 (age 49); Seoul, South Korea
- Education: Daejin University; Theater and Film
- Occupation: Actor
- Years active: 2002–present
- Agent: Origin Entertainment
- Height: 180 cm (5 ft 11 in)
- Spouse: Unknown (m. 2013; div. 2019)
- Children: 2

Korean name
- Hangul: 윤태욱
- Hanja: 尹泰旭
- RR: Yun Taeuk
- MR: Yun T'aeuk

Stage name
- Hangul: 배수빈
- Hanja: 裴秀彬
- RR: Bae Subin
- MR: Pae Subin

Bae Soo-bin (Korean: 배수빈; born Yoon Tae-wook on December 9, 1976) is a South Korean actor. He is best known for his roles in the television dramas Brilliant Legacy, Temptation of an Angel, 49 Days, and Dong Yi. He also starred in the films Girlfriends, The Way - Man of the White Porcelain, 26 Years, and Mai Ratima.

In 2017, Bae signed an exclusive contract with the new agency Origin Entertainment.

== Personal life ==
Bae married his girlfriend, a graduate student, on September 14, 2013. His wife gave birth to their first child, a boy, on June 14, 2014. In December 2020, Bae revealed that he divorced his non-celebrity wife after 6 years of marriage.

== Filmography ==
=== Film ===
Year	Title	Role	Notes	Ref.
2001	Club Butterfly	Jin-ho		
2009	Goodbye Mom	Cheol-min		
2009	After the Banquet	Kim Seong-ho		
2009	Fly High	Ho-soo		
2009	Girlfriends	Jin-ho		
2010	Ghost (Be With Me)	tarot card fortune teller	segment: Tell Me Your Name	
2011	Share the Vision	Seung-chul	4D music video film	
2012	The Way - Man of the White Porcelain	Chung-rim		
2012	Horror Stories	Company president Min	segment: "Secret Recipe"	
2012	26 Years	Kim Joo-an		
2013	Mai Ratima	Soo-young		
2015	Memories of the Sword	Poong-cheon		
2017	Warriors of the Dawn	Jang Yang-sa		
2020	Me and Me	Kim Soo-hyuk		

=== Television series ===
Year	Title	Role	Notes	Ref.
2002	The Proof of Memories	Xiao Han Sheng	Chinese drama	
2004	MBC Best Theater – "My Brother Lives in Shaolin Temple"	Moon Bak-joo		
2004	When a Man Loves a Woman	Seok-hyeon		
2004	Emperor of the Sea	Kim Yang		
2005	MBC Best Theater – "Crying in the Glow of Sunset"			
2005	Fashion 70s	Chinese Communist Army sowi	bit part	
2005	Let's Get Married	Jung Jae-joon		
2006–2007	Jumong	Sa-yong		
2007	Auction House	Park Ki-hyun	Cameo (Episode 12)	
2008	Woman of Matchless Beauty, Park Jung-geum	Detective		
2008	Painter of the Wind	King Jeongjo		
2009	Brilliant Legacy	Park Jun-se		
2009	Temptation of an Angel	Shin Hyun-woo / Ahn Jae-seong		
2010	Dong Yi	Cha Cheon-soo		
2010	KBS Drama Special – "Just Say It!"	Jung Gi-young		
2011	49 Days	Kang Min-ho		
2013	Secret Love	Ahn Do-hoon		
2014	KBS Drama Special – "That Kind of Love"	Jin-wook		
2014	Secret Love	Hyun-joon	(Episodes 5-6: "Lilac")	
2014	The Greatest Marriage	Jo Eun-cha		
2015	My Heart Twinkle Twinkle	Chun Woon-tak		
2015	Who Are You: School 2015	Homeroom teacher	Cameo (Episode 16)	
2018	Nice Witch	Bong Chun-dae		
2018	A Pledge to God	Kim Jae-wook		
2020	Graceful Friends	Jung Jae-hoon		
2021	The King's Affection	Jeong Seok-jo		

=== Variety show ===
Year	Title	Notes
2015	Law of the Jungle in Yap Islands	Cast member

=== Music video appearances ===
Year	Song Title	Artist
2003	"Unfair"	Maggie Chiang
2009	"Don't Call My Name"	Lee Soo-young
2011	"Threads of Your Clothes"	M Signal

== Theater ==
Year	Title	Role	Ref.
2007	Telephone Modern Girl	Sun-tae	
2010	Yi Sang, December 12th	poet Yi Sang	
2013	Masquerade	King Gwanghae/beggar Ha-sun	

== Awards and nominations ==
Year	Award	Category	Nominated work	Result
2008	SBS Drama Awards	New Star Award	Painter of the Wind	Won
2009	SBS Drama Awards	Top 10 Stars	Brilliant Legacy, Temptation of an Angel	Won
2009	SBS Drama Awards	Excellence Award, Actor in a Special Planning Drama	Brilliant Legacy, Temptation of an Angel	Nominated
2009	SBS Drama Awards	Top Excellence Award, Actor	Temptation of an Angel	Nominated
2010	Asia Model Festival Awards	New Star Award	—N/a	Won
2011	Hong Kong Cable TV Awards	Popularity Award	Dong Yi	Won
2011	KBS 감동대상	Hope Award	—N/a	Won
2011	SBS Drama Awards	Excellence Award, Actor in a Drama Special	49 Days	Nominated
2013	KBS Drama Awards	Best Couple Award with Lee Da-hee	Secret Love	Nominated
2013	KBS Drama Awards	Netizen Award, Actor	Secret Love	Nominated
2013	KBS Drama Awards	Best Supporting Actor	Secret Love	Won
2018	MBC Drama Awards	Top Excellence Award, Actor in a Weekend Special Project	A Pledge to God	Nominated
2018	SBS Drama Awards	Excellence Award, Actor in a Daily and Weekend Drama	Nice Witch	Nominated
