= Lee Seung-hyung =

South Korean actor

- Born: Yangju, Gyeonggi, South Korea
- Education: Kyung Hee University - Physical Education
- Occupation: Actor
- Years active: 1989–present

Korean name
- Hangul: 이승형
- RR: I Seunghyeong
- MR: I Sŭnghyŏng

Lee Seung-hyung is a South Korean actor. He is best known as a supporting actor in television dramas, notably in Brilliant Legacy (2009) and Prosecutor Princess (2011).

== Filmography ==
=== Television series ===
Year	Title	Role
1998	White Nights 3.98	ANSP agent
1999	Tomato	
1999	Kuk-hee	
2001	I Want to See Your Face	Seo Jin-woo
2002	Successful Story of a Bright Girl	Assistant chief of public relations
2003	Snowman	Choi Joo-hyung
2003	Rustic Period	Cha Won-ki
2003	Royal Story: Jang Hui-bin	Crown Prince Lee Gyun
2004	Little Women	In-deuk and Jung-wan's manager
2004	Love Story in Harvard	Jason Walker's lawyer
2005	5th Republic	Park Chul-un
2005	My Lovely Sam Soon	Unfaithful husband having dinner (guest, episodes 2 & 4)
2005	Love Needs a Miracle	Yoo Se-joon
2005	That Woman	Kang Seok-joo
2006	I Want to Love	Prosecutor Jang
2007	By My Side	Bae Sun-jang
2007	Fly High	Jang Hyun-soo
2007	Lobbyist	Kang Tae-joon
2008	Woman of Matchless Beauty, Park Jung-geum	Hwang Byung-pal
2008	On Air	Advertiser
2008	Life Special Investigation Team	Jo Min-sik
2008	Strongest Chil Woo	Yusaeng
2008	Working Mom	Lee Bang-won
2008	Star's Lover	Choi Seung-wook
2009	Temptation of Wife	Shin Ae-ri's father
2009	Family's Honor	Ha Joo-jung's ex-boyfriend
2009	Brilliant Legacy	Pyo Sung-chul
2009	Don't Hesitate	Choi Man-soo
2009	Father, Your Place	young Lee Sung-bok
2010	OB & GY	Jung Kyung-joo
2010	A Man Called God	Secretary Pyo
2010	Prosecutor Princess	Cha Myung-soo
2010	Giant	Moon Sung-joong
2011	War of the Roses	Song Hyung-joon
2011	Baby Faced Beauty	Director Ahn Jung-nam
2011	City Hunter	Song Young-deok
2011	Deep Rooted Tree	Nam Sa-chul
2011	If Tomorrow Comes	Son Jung-mo
2012	Moon Embracing the Sun	Han Jae-gil
2012	Man from the Equator	Department head Cha
2012	God of War	Ryu Neung
2012	Five Fingers	Secretary Oh
2013	Incarnation of Money	Go Ho
2013	When a Man Falls in Love	Bae Choon-sam
2013	Master's Sun	Yoo Hye-sung's manager (guest, episode 1)
2013	The Suspicious Housekeeper	Oh Nam-jae
2014	God's Gift: 14 Days	Broadcasting station PD (guest, episodes 1-2)
2014	Angel Eyes	Sung Hyun-ho
2014	Golden Cross	Joo Min-ho
2014	Doctor Stranger	Presidential chief of staff
2014	Endless Love	Director Im Yoon-taek
2015	Life Tracker Lee Jae-goo	Byun Jin-hwan
2015	The Missing	Kim Seok-jin (guest, episode 2)
2015	Splendid Politics	Yi Seo
2015	I Have a Lover	Kim Tae-ho
2016	Monster	Han Sang-goo
2016	Squad 38	Cheon Gap-soo's secretary
2016	I'm Sorry, But I Love You	Gong Man-soo
2017	Missing 9	
2018	My Only One	Chief Secretary Yang
2019	Babel	Director Sin
2019	The Secret Life of My Secretary	Director Park
2020	Good Casting	Nam Bong-man
2024	Beauty and Mr. Romantic	Hong Jin-gu

=== Film ===
Year	Title	Role
1989	Memories of Bal-bari	Myung-chul
1990	Robot Taekwon V 90	Hoon (voice)
1997	The Audition	Kwang-ho
2002	The Beauty in Dream	Tears 2
2006	Moodori	Sung-jin (cameo)

== Awards and nominations ==
Year	Award	Category	Nominated work	Result
2009	SBS Drama Awards	Best Supporting Actor in a Special Planning Drama	Brilliant Legacy	Nominated
