= Rough Cut (2008 film) =

2008 South Korean film

- South Korean poster
- Hangul: 영화는 영화다
- Hanja: 映畫는 映畫다
- RR: Yeonghwaneun yeonghwada
- MR: Yŏnghwanŭn yŏnghwada
- Directed by: Jang Hoon
- Written by: Kim Ki-duk
- Produced by: Kim Ki-duk; David Cho
- Starring: So Ji-sub; Kang Ji-hwan
- Cinematography: Kim Gi-tae
- Edited by: Wang Su-an
- Music by: Roh Hyoung-woo
- Production companies: Showbox; Sponge Entertainment; Kim Ki-duk Film
- Distributed by: Studio 2.0
- Release date: September 11, 2008
- Running time: 113 minutes
- Country: South Korea
- Language: Korean
- Budget: ₩650 million US$1.5 million
- Box office: US$7.2 million

Rough Cut (Korean: 영화는 영화다; lit. 'A Movie is a Movie') is a 2008 South Korean action film. It is the debut feature of director Jang Hoon and based on an original story by Kim Ki-duk. The film had a total of 1,307,688 admissions nationwide.

== Synopsis ==
Gang-pae, played by So Ji-sub, is a local organized crime leader who still wishes he could be in movies. Soo-ta, played by Kang Ji-hwan, is a haughty actor who is easy to provoke. Within his latest film, where he plays a gangster, he gets into the role too much and sends one of the stuntmen to the hospital. The two men meet by chance at a room salon and Soo-ta enlists Gang-pae to join the production. But this real-life gangster will only join the production if the fights are real. The two main characters continue to try and one-up the other every chance they get.

== Cast ==
- So Ji-sub as Gang-pae (gangster)
- Kang Ji-hwan as Jang Soo-ta (actor)
- Hong Soo-hyun as Kang Mi-na (actress)
- Park Soo-young as Chief Lee
- Ko Chang-seok as Director Bong (director)
- Song Yong-tae as Chairman Park
- Jang Hee-jin as Eun-sun (Soo-ta's girlfriend)

== Blurring of real and fake ==
Since this film crosses back and forth between being an actual movie and a movie within a movie, the lines get blurred as to which the audience is watching. Examples:

- The character name Soo-ta (수타) is a parody of 스타 meaning "(movie) star" in Korean. And the character name Gang-pae (강패) is a parody of 깡패 which means "gangster" in Korean.
- Choreographed fights become "real" and a "real" fight turns out to be planned but is however "real".
- The actual movie script for Rough Cut is shown being read and held several times by rehearsing characters and crew within the film.
- Numerous members of the actual crew, including the producer and editor, are seen in the film as "crew members".
- Various movie posters can be seen including Time also written by Kim Ki-duk and an early draft of a Rough Cut poster, which is the same image on the cover of the scripts.
- The "real" arrest of a bloodied Gang-pae for a recent murder turns out to be in image from a film shown in a theater right before the actual credits roll.

== Awards and nominations ==
2008 Blue Dragon Film Awards

- Best New Actor - So Ji-sub
- Best New Actor - Kang Ji-hwan
- Nomination - Best Supporting Actor - Ko Chang-seok
- Nomination - Best New Director - Jang Hoon

2008 Korean Association of Film Critics Awards

- Best Actor - So Ji-sub
- Best New Director - Jang Hoon
- Best New Actor - Kang Ji-hwan

2008 Korean Film Awards

- Best New Actor - Kang Ji-hwan
- Nomination - Best Film
- Nomination - Best Actor - So Ji-sub
- Nomination - Best Supporting Actor - Ko Chang-seok
- Nomination - Best New Director - Jang Hoon
- Nomination - Best Screenplay - Kim Ki-duk

2008 Director's Cut Awards

- Best Producer - Kim Ki-duk

2009 Asian Film Awards

- Nomination - Best Newcomer - So Ji-sub

2009 Baeksang Arts Awards

- Best New Actor - So Ji-sub
- Best New Actor - Kang Ji-hwan
- Nomination - Best Film
- Nomination - Best New Director - Jang Hoon
- Nomination - Best Screenplay - Kim Ki-duk

2009 Shanghai International Film Festival

- Best Music - Roh Hyoung-woo

2009 Buil Film Awards

- Best New Actor - So Ji-sub

2009 Busan Film Critics Awards

- Best New Actor - So Ji-sub
- Best New Actor - Kang Ji-hwan

2009 Grand Bell Awards

- Best Screenplay - Kim Ki-duk, Jang Hoon, Ok Jin-gon, Oh Se-yeon
- Nomination - Best New Director - Jang Hoon
- Nomination - Best New Actor - So Ji-sub
