= Phantom (South Korean TV series) =

South Korean television series

- Promotional poster
- Also known as: Ghost
- Hangul: 유령
- Hanja: 幽靈
- RR: Yuryeong
- MR: Yuryŏng
- Genre: Mystery; Psychological; Police procedural
- Created by: StudioS (SBS)
- Written by: Kim Eun-hee
- Directed by: Kim Hyung-shik; Park Shin-woo
- Starring: So Ji-sub; Lee Yeon-hee
- Composer: Choi Seung-wook
- Country of origin: South Korea
- Original language: Korean
- No. of episodes: 20

Production
- Producer: Choi Moon-suk
- Production location: Korea
- Running time: Wednesdays and Thursdays at 21:55 (KST)
- Production company: HB Entertainment

Original release
- Network: SBS TV
- Release: 30 May – 9 August 2012

Phantom (Korean: 유령; RR: Yuryeong), also known as Ghost, is a 2012 South Korean television series, starring So Ji-sub, Lee Yeon-hee, Um Ki-joon, Kwak Do-won, and Song Ha-yoon. The police procedural tackles crimes and clues in the cyber world, weaving a massive, twist-filled mystery of murders, identity switches, corruption and conspiracy.

It aired on SBS TV from May 30 to August 9, 2012 on Wednesdays and Thursdays at 21:55 for 20 episodes.

== Plot ==
Kim Woo-hyun is the only son of a prominent police officer. Determined to make his own mark, he breezes through the police academy, and along the way racks up accolades, top of the class honors, a lot of praise and perhaps envy from his colleagues. Assigned to the cyber investigations unit, Detective Kim finds himself entrenched in an intense cat and mouse game with faceless enemies in the cyber world. Tirelessly hunting a hacker named Hades, he traces the hacker's location to an apartment building and arrives just in time to witness an actress fall to her death from the high-rise.

What appears initially to be a suicide case reveals a trail of crime and conspiracy as Hades broadcasts a video clip showing a perpetrator pushing the actress to her death. Suspected to be the perpetrator, Hades is hunted down by Woo-hyun, who finds out that Hades is in fact his past roommate in the police academy, Park Ki-young. Ki-young escapes, and later infiltrates the police headquarters in search of an important evidence proving his innocence. He is caught by Yoo Kang-mi, with whom he watches a video titled 'Phantom' that reveals a murder linking right back to Woo-hyun. Ki-young once again escapes, but calls Woo-hyun to meet up with him in an abandoned factory. The factory explodes, and one died while the other suffered severe burns. In a mistaken identity, Ki-young is sent to the hospital for treatment. Ki-young recovers and assumes Woo-hyun's identity, working together with Kang-mi to defeat the enigmatic nemesis and do justice for his friend's sacrifice.

== Cast ==
=== Main characters ===
- So Ji-sub - Kim Woo-hyun / Park Ki-young
- Lee Yeon-hee - Yoo Kang-mi
- Um Ki-joon - Jo Hyun-min
- Kwak Do-won - Kwon Hyuk-joo
- Song Ha-yoon (Note: Credited as Kim Byul.) - Choi Seung-yeon

=== Cyber Investigation Team ===
- Kwon Hae-hyo - Han Young-seok
- G.O - Lee Tae-kyun
- Im Ji-kyu - Byun Sang-woo
- Baek Seung-hyeon - Kang Eun-jin
- Bae Min-hee - Lee Hye-ram

=== Supporting characters ===
- Choi Jung-woo - Shin Kyung-soo
- Jang Hyun-sung - Jeon Jae-wook
- Yoon Ji-hye - Goo Yeon-joo
- Jung Dong-hwan - Kim Seok-joon
- Lee Tae-woo - Kim Seon-woo
- Jung Moon-sung - Yeom Jae-hee
- Myung Gye-nam - Jo Kyung-shin
- Lee Jae-yoon - Jo Jae-min
- Park Ji-il - Director Moon
- Lee Ki-young - Im Chi-hyun
- Lee Won-keun - Kwon Do-young

=== Guest appearances ===
- Choi Daniel - Park Gi-young / Hades (ep 1-2, 6)
- Esom - Shin Hyo-jung (ep 1)
- Kim Sung-oh - Shin Hyo-jung's fan (ep 1)
- Lee Joon - passerby (ep 1)
- Jung Da-hye - Jung So-eun (ep 3)
- Kang Sung-min - Yang Seung-jae (ep 3-4)
- Kwak Ji-min - Kwon Eun-sol (ep 7)
- Han Bo-bae - Kwak Ji-soo (ep 7-8)
- Ha Seung-ri - Jung Mi-young (ep 7-8)
- Kim Min-ha - Kim Hee-eun
- Jin Kyung - Oh Yeon-sook
- Jung Myung-joon - TV news announcer
- Jang Hang-jun - building owner
- Jeon In-taek - Jo Kyung-moon
- Kwon Tae-won - Nam Sang-won

== Reception ==
=== Ratings ===
Episode #	Original broadcast date	Average audience share			
Episode #	Original broadcast date	TNmS Ratings		AGB Nielsen	
Episode #	Original broadcast date	Nationwide	Seoul National Capital Area	Nationwide	Seoul National Capital Area
1	30 May 2012	10.7%	13.4%	7.6%	8.6%
2	31 May 2012	12.1%	14.5%	8.9%	9.9%
3	6 June 2012	13.0%	17.7%	11.4%	13.3%
4	7 June 2012	14.2%	17.3%	11.8%	12.3%
5	13 June 2012	11.9%	15.3%	10.6%	11.9%
6	14 June 2012	13.1%	16.0%	12.2%	13.7%
7	20 June 2012	12.7%	14.9%	10.8%	11.8%
8	21 June 2012	14.1%	17.0%	11.2%	12.6%
9	27 June 2012	13.1%	15.8%	11.1%	11.6%
10	28 June 2012	13.5%	17.0%	11.0%	12.0%
11	4 July 2012	14.1%	17.1%	11.4%	12.0%
12	5 July 2012	15.6%	17.9%	13.8%	15.0%
13	11 July 2012	15.7%	19.6%	13.3%	14.3%
14	12 July 2012	17.0%	20.4%	14.2%	15.7%
15	18 July 2012	15.3%	18.3%	13.4%	14.9%
16	19 July 2012	16.0%	19.8%	13.9%	15.4%
17	25 July 2012	14.5%	16.9%	13.3%	15.0%
18	26 July 2012	16.5%	19.4%	15.3%	16.0%
19	8 August 2012	13.3%	16.5%	12.9%	14.3%
20	9 August 2012	13.7%	16.4%	12.2%	12.8%
Average		14.0%	17.0%	12.0%	13.2%

=== Awards and nominations ===
Year	Award	Category	Recipient	Result
2012	5th Korea Drama Awards	Top Excellence Award, Actor	So Ji-sub	Nominated
2012	5th Korea Drama Awards	Excellence Award, Actor	Kwak Do-won	Won
2012	1st K-Drama Star Awards	Excellence Award, Actor	So Ji-sub	Nominated
2012	SBS Drama Awards	Top Excellence Award, Actor in a Drama Special	So Ji-sub	Won
2012	SBS Drama Awards	Excellence Award, Actor in a Drama Special	Um Ki-joon	Nominated
2012	SBS Drama Awards	Excellence Award, Actress in a Drama Special	Lee Yeon-hee	Nominated
2012	SBS Drama Awards	Special Acting Award, Actor in a Drama Special	Kwak Do-won	Won
2012	SBS Drama Awards	Special Acting Award, Actor in a Drama Special	Jang Hyun-sung	Nominated
2012	SBS Drama Awards	Special Acting Award, Actress in a Drama Special	Song Ha-yoon	Nominated
2012	SBS Drama Awards	Top 10 Stars	So Ji-sub	Won

== Original soundtrack ==
Phantom Original Sound Track

Soundtrack album by Various Artists
- Released: July 17, 2012
- Genres: Pop, K-pop, soundtrack, R&B
- Labels: HB Entertainment; LOEN Entertainment

Phantom OST
No.	Title	Artist	Length
1.	"유령(같이 사랑했잖아) - Title" (Phantom (We Used to Love))	MBLAQ	4:00
2.	"그리워 운다" (I Miss You So I Cry)	Shin Bora	4:14
3.	"그리워서 눈물나서" (Tears Fall Because I Miss You)	Lee Soo-young	4:05
4.	"Burn Out"	Block B	3:47
5.	"어떻게" (How)	Lee Ki-chan	4:15
6.	"GHOST"	Various Artists	1:29
7.	"Save You"	Various Artists	2:40
8.	"Goodbye, My Face"	Various Artists	2:50
9.	"Mysterious Man"	Various Artists	2:10
10.	"Steganography"	Various Artists	2:10
11.	"New Life"	Various Artists	3:12
12.	"Beautiful Agony"	Various Artists	2:26
13.	"Stuxnet"	Various Artists	1:49
14.	"Slow Walking"	Various Artists	1:00
15.	"Black Out"	Various Artists	1:32
16.	"유령(같이 사랑했잖아) (Inst.)" (Phantom (We Used to Love) (Inst.))	Various Artists	4:00
17.	"Burn Out (Inst.)"	Various Artists	3:47
