= Golden Goblet Award for Best Music =

Chinese film award

The Golden Goblet Award for Best Music (Chinese: 金爵奖最佳音乐) is a prize given to the films in the main category of competition at the Shanghai International Film Festival.

== Award winners ==
Year	Film	Composer
1999	Beastie Girl	(Austria) Günter Mokesch
2001	Bo Ba Bu	(France) Claude Samart
2002	All About Lily Chou-Chou	(Japan) Takeshi Kobayashi
2003	no award this year	
2004	Untold Scandal	(South Korea) Lee Byung-woo
2005	Thoi xa vang	(Vietnam) Huu Phuc Dang
2006	River Queen	(New Zealand) Karl Jenkins
2007	Love and Honor	(Japan) Isao Tomita
2008	Loss	(Lithuania) Andrius Mamontovas
2009	Rough Cut	(South Korea) Hyoung-woo Roh
2010	Deep in the Clouds	(China) Giong Lim
2011	The Young Man Sings Folk Song In The Opposite Door	(China) Wen Zi
2012	Chrysalis	(Spain) Avshalom Caspi
