= Master's Sun =

2013 South Korean TV series

- Promotional poster
- Also known as: The Master's Sun; The Sun of My Master; The Sun of the Lord; Mr. Joo's Miss Tae
- Genre: Romantic comedy Fantasy; Mystery
- Written by: Hong Jung-eun; Hong Mi-ran
- Directed by: Jin Hyuk
- Starring: So Ji-sub; Gong Hyo-jin
- Composer: Oh Jun-seong
- Country of origin: South Korea
- Original language: Korean
- No. of episodes: 17

Production
- Executive producer: Son Jung-hyun
- Producers: Kim Jin-geun; Lee Young-joon
- Running time: 60 minutes
- Production company: Bon Factory Worldwide

Original release
- Network: SBS TV
- Release: August 7 – October 3, 2013

Master's Sun (Korean: 주군의 태양; RR: Jugunui taeyang) is a 2013 South Korean television series starring So Ji-sub and Gong Hyo-jin. The romantic comedy is written by the Hong sisters and aired for 17 episodes on SBS TV every Wednesday and Thursday at 21:55 (KST) from August 7 to October 3, 2013.

== Synopsis ==
Joo Joong-won (So Ji-sub) is the cold and distant CEO of Kingdom, a conglomerate that includes a major department store and hotel. He meets the gloomy Tae Gong-shil (Gong Hyo-jin), who started seeing ghosts after an accident. Their lives take a new turn as they discover whenever Gong-shil touches Joong-won the ghosts that surround her disappear; after much pleading from Gong-shil to allow her to stay by Joong-won's side in return she must help him recover a fortune that was stolen from him during a kidnapping attempt.

== Cast ==
=== Main ===
- So Ji-sub as Joo Joong-won
  - Kim Myung-soo as young Joo Joong-won

President of the Kingdom Group. A handsome, self-centered, haughty, ambitious, and money-driven businessman, Joong-won puts a price on every relationship. The trauma of a kidnapping incident when he was younger has rendered him extremely mercenary and distrustful, as well as dyslexic. Upon learning of Gong-shil's supernatural ability, he keeps her near him, hoping to use her to communicate with his dead girlfriend Hee-joo in tracking down the ₩10 billion ransom paid in the form of Joong-won's mother's diamond necklace (the case's statute of limitations is almost up). But as he grows closer to Gong-shil, Joong-won comes to value the more important things in life. (His first name joong-won literally means "ruling position" or "supremacy.")

- Gong Hyo-jin as Tae Gong-shil

A beautiful young woman. She was once a bright and sunny person. But after a mysterious accident, she suddenly gains the ability to see ghosts. They continually haunt her – some wanting her to fulfill their last wishes, others merely scaring her. Gong-shil becomes an outcast, unable to hold down a job and suffers from insomnia. She then works as a cleaning lady at Kingdom shopping mall after she discovers that the ghosts are banished whenever she touches the company president, Joong-won, the most selfish man she's ever known. She begins working for him as his secretary (in name only) and because of Joong-won, she slowly opens herself up to the world.

- Seo In-guk as Kang Woo

A former soldier who served in the Zaytun Division of the South Korean army, which was deployed to Iraq in the mid-2000s. After his discharge, he uses that experience and skill set in pursuing a job in the private sector, thus leading him to become hired as the head of security of Joong-won's shopping mall company. He mysteriously keeps tabs on Joong-won, and notes the latter's interest in Gong-shil, who is his neighbor at the apartment building he'd recently moved into. As part of his plan, Kang Woo confesses that he likes Gong-shil, but his feelings soon begin to turn real, though it shown that he enters into a relationship with Tae Yi-ryung after falling for her after she had pursued him many times, he is seen promising her a kiss on the red carpet indicating that he had moved on from Gong-shil and now loves Tae Yi-ryung and in a relationship with her after the multiple encounters they had, along with her pursuing him.

- Kim Yoo-ri as Tae Yi-ryung

A top star and the model of Joong-won's shopping mall. Yi-ryung's wedding to a soccer player is inadvertently wrecked by Gong-shil, whom she considered her high school rival. Though not related, they share the same surname and in high school they were given the following nicknames: the then-more popular Gong-shil was called "Big Sun" while the homely Yi-ryung, who wore braces and glasses, was called "Little Sun". Wanting revenge against Gong-shil for her bitter high school experiences and ruined wedding, Yi-ryung plans on seducing Joong-won, but finds herself falling for Kang Woo instead.

=== Supporting ===
- Han Bo-reum as Cha Hee-joo (Hanna Brown)

Joong-won's ex-girlfriend. Raised in an orphanage, the shy Hee-joo meets Joong-won there and falls in love with him. Later on, she was killed in the botched kidnapping scheme. Originally thought to be a victim, Joong-won learns that Hee-joo was working with the kidnappers, a fact that he does not reveal to anyone until he meets Gong-shil. However, it is later revealed Hee-joo did not die. In fact, it is actually Hanna who died and follows Joong-won as a ghost.

- Hwang Sun-hee as Hanna Brown (Cha Hee-joo)

Hee-joo's twin sister. Born to two poor artists who died in an accident, the twins were separated. Hanna was adopted and raised comfortably in England, while Hee-joo grew up in an orphanage. After the twin sisters meet in their teens, Joong-won falls in love with the outgoing and sweet Hanna, whom he mistakenly believes to be Hee-joo. Driven by jealousy, Hee-joo masterminds the kidnapping, leading to Hanna's death. Afterwards, Hee-joo assumes her twin sister's identity and returns to England as Hanna. She later undergoes cosmetic surgery to change her facial features and moves next door to Aunt Sung-ran in order to continue her revenge against Joong-won.

- Kim Mi-kyung as Joo Sung-ran

Joong-won's aunt.

- Lee Jong-won as Do Seok-chul

Sung-ran's much younger husband, and vice president of Kingdom Group.

- Choi Jung-woo as Kim Gwi-do

Joong-won's secretary, who also happens to be a lawyer and child psychologist. He is supportive of Joong-won and Gong-shil's relationship. Secretary Kim is later revealed to be Hee-joo and Hanna's uncle.

- Park Hee-von as Tae Gong-ri

Gong-shil's older sister who works at a coffee shop.

- Kim Yong-gun as Chairman Joo

Joong-won's father. He hired Kang Woo to secretly spy on his son.

- Jeong Ga-eun as Ahn Jin-joo

Member of Kingdom's security team.

- Lee Jae-won as Lee Han-joo

A meddlesome busybody and security team member at Kingdom shopping mall. He falls in love with Tae Gong-ri.

- Lee Chun-hee as Yoo Jin-woo

A man who can see ghosts. He fell in love with Gong-shil's spirit while her body was in a coma.

- Lee Do-hyun as Lee Seung-mo

Little boy who lives in Gong-shil's apartment building.

- Hong Eun-taek as Lee Seung-joon

Little boy who lives in Gong-shil's apartment building.

- Ko Nak-hyun as Joon Suk

Ghost boy who always asks for coffee.

=== Special appearances ===
- Jin Yi-han as Yoo Hye-sung (ep. 1)

Top soccer player. He is engaged to Yi-ryung, and they're about to be married in a lavish wedding sponsored by Kingdom Group. But their arguments about their future yield no compromise; he wants to keep playing soccer abroad despite his age and injuries, while she wants him to stay in the country so that they can become the "Korean Becks and Posh". Hye-sung has never gotten over his girlfriend Mi-kyung, whom he believes dumped him cruelly before he became famous, thus driving him to succeed.

- Song Min-jung as Kim Mi-kyung (ep. 1)

Ghost in bridal gown, Hye-sung's dead ex-girlfriend. She and Hye-sung were happy and in love, and she whole heartedly believed in his athletic abilities. But when Mi-kyung learned that she was terminally ill, she broke up with Hye-sung without telling him the reason. After seeing him in a loveless relationship with Yi-ryung, her ghost reappears before him, leading him to cancel the wedding and decide to keep playing soccer.

- Lee Seung-hyung as Hye-sung's manager (ep. 1)

He blackmails Hye-sung using Mi-kyung's name, knowing full well that she's already deceased.

- Nam Myung-ryul as man unwilling to sell his house (ep. 1)

His house is built in the middle of the land Joong-won is planning to turn into a golf course. He previously agreed to sell his house to Joong-won, then reneges on their deal, saying his dead wife opposes his decision to sell, since the flower on her favorite plant never wilts. Joong-won cuts off the flower, and gets his contract. The man tells Joong-won, "If ghosts exist, they'll get you for sure."

- Kim Dong-gyun as gambler son (ep. 1)

The ghost of his elderly mother appears before Gong-shil to hand over her bankbook containing ₩10 million for her funeral expenses and to pay off their debts. Instead, the son gambles away the money.

- Lee Sung-woo as Gong-shil's date (ep. 1)

He tries to kiss her, but Gong-shil pushes him away after seeing a ghost over his shoulder.

- Bang Min-ah as Kim Ga-young (ep. 2)

Leader of a three-member schoolgirl clique, who think they're being haunted by the ghost of a classmate they ignored.

- Kim Bo-ra as Ha Yoo-jin (ep. 2)

Member of the schoolgirl clique.

- Park Hyo-bin as Joo-hyun (ep. 2)

Member of the schoolgirl clique.

- Lee Hye-in as Lee Eun-seol (ep. 2)

Schoolgirl ghost. Eun-seol had wanted to be Ga-young, Yoo-jin and Joo-hyun's friend. She followed them to Kingdom Mall one day, but after overhearing them mocking her, she ran away and was hit by an oncoming truck. Later, the three tearfully apologize for treating her badly, and Eun-seol shows her forgiveness when a nearby vending machine drops three sodas, in their favorite flavors.

- Kim Min-ha as Park Ji-eun (ep. 2)

Another classmate who wanted to scare the clique, after witnessing them being mean to Eun-seol that day at the mall. So using the cellphone that Eun-seol had left behind, Ji-eun sent the three a photo of themselves in front of the mall's fountain with a photoshopped Eun-seol.

- Kim Sang-joong as host of Mystery Z, a TV show similar to Unsolved Mysteries (ep. 2)
- Yoo Kyung-ah as Choi Yoon-hee (ep. 3)

Red shoe ghost. A wealthy woman whose mother owns buildings in the affluent Gangnam District. Yoon-hee not only catches her husband cheating on her, she also overhears him telling his mistress that he plans to kill her and make it look like a hiking accident. He sees her and chases her through the empty mall (making her lose one of her red shoes), and while driving to get away from him, her car hits a parked truck and Yoon-hee dies.

- Baek Seung-hyeon as Yoon-hee's husband (ep. 3)

A store owner in Kingdom Mall. He acts as Yoon-hee's devoted husband, and later, a grieving widower. But in reality, he plans to kill his wife and his mother-in-law to get his hands on their money. Gong-shil and Joong-won reveal the truth about his misdeeds, though Joong-won gruffly claims he only did it because the culprit had been planning to transfer his store to Kingdom Mall's competitor, Giant Mall.

- Jang Ga-hyun as red lipstick ghost (ep. 4)

She possesses vain and insecure women, telling them, "You're the most beautiful."

- Yoo Min-kyu as Ji-woo (ep. 5)

Groom ghost. Because of his sickly constitution, he never left his grandmother's mansion. Ji-woo fell in love with Sun-young, the tomboyish girl who delivered milk to their house. Too embarrassed to tell her that he likes her, he constantly teased and bickered with Sun-young. But before he could confess, he fell ill and died young.

- Kim Bo-mi as Sun-young (ep. 5)

Milk delivery girl. After Ji-woo teasingly compared her to a green rose, cabbage-looking and not very pretty, he kissed her. But she ran away, thinking he was just messing with her. After Gong-shil and Joong-won track her down, she learns the truth about Ji-woo's feelings and cries upon seeing the bouquet of green roses in his room that never wilts. After the ghost of Ji-woo leans in to kiss Sun-young one last time, President Wang sees the flowers finally wilt and disappear. Gong-shil tells Joong-won that green roses symbolize a rare noble love that only exists in heaven.

- Jeon Yang-ja as President Wang (ep. 5)

Ji-woo's grandmother, and company president. She believes that her grandson's spirit isn't at peace because he died without ever falling in love, so she hires a shaman to arrange a ghost marriage for him, but Ji-woo keeps rejecting the brides. Initially planning to invest in Giant Mall, Wang offers to back Joong-won financially if he'll let Gong-shil become her grandson's ghost bride.

- Jung Yoon-seok as the doll ghost (ep. 5-7)
- Lee Yong-nyeo as Madam Go (ep. 5, 13)

Shaman and famous ghost matchmaker of the upper crust. She tells Gong-shil that the reason ghosts are drawn to her and seek her out is because she shines so brightly, ominously adding that Gong-shil needs to be on her guard because "They're looking for an opportunity... to return".

- Hong Won-pyo as Hyung-chul (ep. 6)

A soldier who'd found it tough adjusting to mandatory military service, until he was assigned to train an army dog. They become the best of friends, with the dog defending him from bullies and Hyung-chul teaching the dog to dance to "Nobody", a song by his favorite girl group (Note: This part of episode, the music of "Nobody" of Wonder Girls changed to "Haru Haru" by BIGBANG in the televised broadcast in the Philippines by GMA-7). After the dog fell ill, Hyung-chul was ordered to put down the animal, and the trauma drives him to go AWOL. His ghost dog appears before Gong-shil, and she and Joong-won prevent Hyung-chul from committing suicide.

- Jo Hwi-joon as Chang-min (ep. 7)

A young boy who's a victim of child abuse. His doll is haunted by three children who'd died from similar parental neglect and violence. In the process of rescuing him, Gong-shil and Joong-won get arrested for trespassing and kidnapping, but are later released. Kingdom Group pays for Chang-min's medical bills and reports his mother for her crime.

- Jeon Jin-seo as The doll ghost (ep. 7)
- Jo Se-ho as Park passer-by (ep. 7)
- Kim Hee-jung as Kang Gil-ja (ep. 8)

An overworked and under-appreciated ajumma who received a voucher for Kingdom Hotel and enormously enjoyed her stay there. Now comatose at a hospital, her spirit keeps haunting the hotel swimming pool because she never wants to leave. Gong-shil urges her to return to life, and Gil-ja wakes up and sees her family tearful with gratitude at her recovery.

- Jung Chan as Louis Jang (ep. 9)

A famous concert pianist who was utterly dependent on his wife, and can't get over her recent death. When the ghost of his dead wife possesses Gong-shil's body, he attempts to take her to Paris with him as his muse.

- Lee Hyo-rim as Louis Jang's wife (ep. 9)

Gong-shil helps her bake a pie for her husband (their ritual before every concert). She borrows Gong-shil's body to drive some sense into her husband one last time. Tired of living in Louis's shadow when she was alive, she tells him that he's not picky but lazy, and that he has to let her go.

- Seo Hyo-rim as Park Seo-hyun (ep. 9–10)

A chaebol heiress. During Joong-won's business trip to China, she agrees to become his fake fiancée. The arrangement is mutually beneficial for both; it enables Seo-hyun to take over her family's company Sejin Group (a parody of Empire of Gold), and Joong-won uses her to keep Gong-shil at arm's length. Joong-won breaks the fake engagement after one week.

- Lee Jong-hyuk as Lee Jae-seok (ep. 11)

CEO of Giant Mall, business rival of Kingdom Mall. He's grieving over the death of his father, but also angry because he believes that his father had a mistress, since women's clothing, makeup and perfume were found scattered in his father's house.

- Lee Jae-yong as Lee Yong-jae (ep. 11)

Chairman of Giant Mall, and Jae-seok's father. His ghost eventually reveals that he hadn't been unfaithful to his wife, but instead was secretly a cross-dresser.

- Goo Seung-hyun as Woo-jin (ep. 12)

The ghost of a little boy who was accidentally killed when a mechanic hit Woo-jin with his car. Thinking that Gong-shil witnessed the crime, the mechanic attempts to kill her, but Joong-won protects her and nearly dies instead.

- Lee Ga-ryeong as Ghost woman victim at Kingdom party

A woman who was killed at Kingdom party.

== Original soundtrack ==
Master's Sun Original Sound Track

Soundtrack album by Various Artists
- Released: October 2, 2013
- Genres: Pop, K-pop, soundtrack, R&B
- Labels: Bon Factory Worldwide; LOEN Entertainment

Disc 1:
No.	Title	Artist	Length
1.	"Touch Love"	Yoon Mi-rae
2.	"미치게 만들어" (You Make Me Go Crazy)	Hyolyn (Sistar)
3.	"겁도 없이" (No Matter What)	Seo In-guk
4.	"낮과 밤" (Day and Night)	Gummy
5.	"너와 나" (You and I)	Hong Dae-kwang
6.	"All About"	Melody Day
7.	"Last One"	Youme feat. Joo-seok
8.	"Mystery"	Chung Dong-ha (Boohwal)
9.	"Touch Love (Inst.)"	Various Artists
10.	"미치게 만들어 (Inst." (You Make Me Go Crazy (Inst.))	Various Artists
11.	"겁도 없이 (Inst.)" (No Matter What (Inst.))	Various Artists
12.	"낮과 밤 (Inst.)" (Day and Night (Inst.))	Various Artists
13.	"너와 나 (Inst.)" (You and I (Inst.))	Various Artists
14.	"All About (Inst.)"	Various Artists
15.	"Last One (Inst.)"	Various Artists
16.	"Mystery (Inst.)"	Various Artists

Disc 2:
No.	Title	Artist	Length
1.	"Joogoon's Sun"	Oh Joon-sung
2.	"Who Are You? (Ending Rock Guitar ver.)"	Oh Joon-sung feat. Lee Byung-ho
3.	"Out of the Ghost"	Oh Joon-sung
4.	"Ghost Eyes"	Oh Joon-sung
5.	"This Is Me"	Oh Joon-sung
6.	"Enjoy Party"	Oh Joon-sung
7.	"In Memories"	Oh Joon-sung
8.	"Tears in Rain"	Oh Joon-sung
9.	"Candy Love (Touch Love Guitar ver.)"	Oh Joon-sung
10.	"Love Connection"	Oh Joon-sung
11.	"Ghost Tango"	Oh Joon-sung
12.	"Empty Garden"	Oh Joon-sung
13.	"Keep Out"	Oh Joon-sung
14.	"Dangerous Zone (Opening Title)"	Oh Joon-sung
15.	"Painful Memory"	Oh Joon-sung
16.	"Ghost Presents"	Oh Joon-sung
17.	"Love Is Like a Picture"	Oh Joon-sung
18.	"Feather Kiss"	Oh Joon-sung
19.	"White Flower"	Oh Joon-sung
20.	"Ghost World"	Oh Joon-sung
21.	"Foolish Spy"	Oh Joon-sung
22.	"Dirty Hands"	Oh Joon-sung
23.	"Sad Wave"	Oh Joon-sung
24.	"Water in the Sky"	Oh Joon-sung
25.	"Like a Mosquito"	Oh Joon-sung
26.	"Making Shadow"	Oh Joon-sung
27.	"High Jump"	Oh Joon-sung
28.	"Lake Wave"	Oh Joon-sung

== Ratings ==
Ep.	Original broadcast date	Average audience share			
Ep.	Original broadcast date	Nielsen Korea		TNmS	
Ep.	Original broadcast date	Nationwide	Seoul	Nationwide	Seoul
1	August 7, 2013	13.6%	14.8%	17.5%	21.6%
2	August 8, 2013	14.4%	15.8%	15.9%	19.0%
3	August 14, 2013	15.2%	16.6%	17.1%	20.2%
4	August 15, 2013	16.8%	17.6%	17.6%	19.5%
5	August 21, 2013	16.2%	17.4%	17.3%	19.5%
6	August 22, 2013	16.6%	17.5%	19.5%	22.6%
7	August 28, 2013	16.1%	17.2%	17.0%	18.9%
8	August 29, 2013	17.8%	19.2%	17.6%	20.2%
9	September 4, 2013	16.8%	18.3%	17.2%	20.0%
10	September 5, 2013	17.3%	18.5%	17.3%	20.0%
11	September 11, 2013	18.3%	20.0%	17.9%	20.8%
12	September 12, 2013	19.3%	20.4%	19.7%	23.8%
13	September 19, 2013	14.8%	15.7%	15.6%	17.0%
14	September 25, 2013	18.4%	20.0%	18.4%	20.9%
15	September 26, 2013	19.1%	19.7%	19.3%	21.5%
16	October 2, 2013	19.7%	20.9%	18.9%	22.3%
17	October 3, 2013	21.8%	23.6%	21.1%	24.4%
Average		17.2%	18.4%	18.0%	20.7%

== Awards and nominations ==
Year	Award	Category	Recipient	Result
2013	6th Korea Drama Awards	Top Excellence Award, Actress	Gong Hyo-jin	Nominated
2013	6th Korea Drama Awards	Best Young Actor	Kim Myung-soo	Nominated
2013	2nd APAN Star Awards	Top Excellence Award, Actor	So Ji-sub	Nominated
2013	2nd APAN Star Awards	Top Excellence Award, Actress	Gong Hyo-jin	Nominated
2013	2nd APAN Star Awards	Best New Actress	Kim Yoo-ri	Won
2013	5th MelOn Music Awards	Best OST	Touch Love – Yoon Mi-rae	Won
2013	15th Mnet Asian Music Awards	Best OST	Touch Love – Yoon Mi-rae	Won
2013	SBS Drama Awards	Top Excellence Award, Actor in a Miniseries	So Ji-sub	Won
2013	SBS Drama Awards	Top Excellence Award, Actress in a Miniseries	Gong Hyo-jin	Nominated
2013	SBS Drama Awards	Special Award, Actor in a Miniseries	Choi Jung-woo	Nominated
2013	SBS Drama Awards	Special Award, Actress in a Miniseries	Kim Mi-kyung	Won
2013	SBS Drama Awards	Netizen Popularity Award	So Ji-sub	Nominated
2013	SBS Drama Awards	Best Couple Award	So Ji-sub and Gong Hyo-jin	Nominated
2013	SBS Drama Awards	Best Couple Award	Seo In-guk and Kim Yoo-ri	Nominated
2013	SBS Drama Awards	New Star Award	Seo In-guk	Won
2013	SBS Drama Awards	New Star Award	Kim Yoo-ri	Won
2013	SBS Drama Awards	Top 10 Stars	So Ji-sub	Won
2014	50th Baeksang Arts Awards	Most Popular Actor (TV)	So Ji-sub	Nominated
2014	50th Baeksang Arts Awards	Most Popular Actor (TV)	Seo In-guk	Nominated
2014	50th Baeksang Arts Awards	Most Popular Actress (TV)	Gong Hyo-jin	Nominated
2014	9th Seoul International Drama Awards	Outstanding Korean Drama	Master's Sun	Nominated
2014	9th Seoul International Drama Awards	Outstanding Korean Drama OST	You Make Me Go Crazy – Hyolyn	Nominated
2014	9th Seoul International Drama Awards	Outstanding Korean Drama OST	Touch Love – Yoon Mi-rae	Nominated
2014	9th Seoul International Drama Awards	People's Choice Actor	So Ji-sub	Nominated
2014	9th Seoul International Drama Awards	People's Choice Actress	Gong Hyo-jin	Nominated
2014	7th Korea Drama Awards	Best OST	Touch Love – Yoon Mi-rae	Nominated

== See also ==
- Hanada Shōnen Shi, a Japanese manga series with a similar plot.
