= Sung Yu-ri filmography =

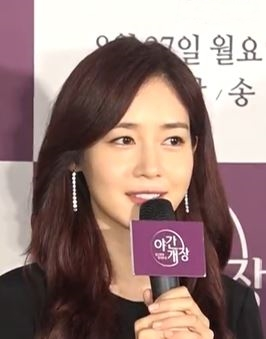
- Sung Yu-ri in 2018
- Film: 8
- Television series: 13
- Television show: 5

Sung Yu-ri (Korean: 성유리, born March 3, 1981) is a German-born South Korean actress and singer.

== Television series ==
Year	Title	Role	Refs.
2002	Bad Girls	Han Yeol-mae	
2002	My Platoon Leader	Lee Kang-hyun	
2003	Thousand Years of Love	Princess Buyeo Ju	
2003	Naebang Naebang	Lee Yoo-jung	
2004	First Love of a Royal Prince	Kim Yu-bin	
2006	One Fine Day	Seo Ha-neul/Park Hae-won	
2006	The Snow Queen	Kim Bo-ra	
2008	Hong Gil-dong	Heo Yi-nok	
2009	Swallow the Sun	Lee Soo-hyun	
2011	Romance Town	Noh Soon-geum	
2012	Feast of the Gods	Go Joon-young	
2013	The Secret of Birth	Jung Yi-hyun	
2016	Monster	Oh Soo-yeon/Cha Jeong-eun	

== Film ==
Year	Title	Role	Refs.
2002	Emergency Act 19	Fin.K.L (bit part)	
2004	How to Keep My Love	TV host (cameo)	
2009	Maybe (Rabbit and Lizard)	May Smith/Won-sun	
2012	Runway Cop	Ko Young-jae	
2013	A Boy's Sister	Yoon-hee	
2014	Chorogi and the Stalker Guy (short film)	Soo-bin's mother	
2014	The Disciple John Oak	Documentary narrator	
2015	Summer Snow	Seo-jung	

== Variety/radio show ==
Year	Title	Notes	Refs.
2002–2003	Section TV Entertainment	Host	
2010	Wanderers of Kalahari, Meerkat and Bushmen	Documentary narrator	
2011	Launch My Life: Sung Yu-ri's Bucket List		
2011	Sweet Night with Yang Jung-a	Guest DJ	
2013–2015	Healing Camp, Aren't You Happy	Host	
2022	Is parting a recall?	Host	
