= Ahn Yong-joon =

South Korean actor (born 1987)

- Born: November 22, 1987 (age 38); Seoul, South Korea
- Education: Myongji College - Theatre and Visual Arts
- Occupation: Actor
- Years active: 2006–present
- Height: 1.75 m (5 ft 9 in)
- Spouse: Venny (Bae So-min) (m. 2015)
- Children: 1

Korean name
- Hangul: 안용준
- RR: An Yongjun
- MR: An Yongjun

Ahn Yong-joon (born November 22, 1987) is a South Korean actor.

== Filmography ==
=== Television series ===
- Under the Queen's Umbrella (2022); Cameo (episode 12)
- The Secret House (2022)
- Tunnel (2017)
- Make Your Wish (MBC, 2014)
- Two Weeks (2013)
- Jeon Woo-chi (2012)
- Full House Take 2 (2012)
- Monster (2012)
- Quiz of God 2 (2011)
- KBS Drama Special – "Our Happy Days of Youth" (2011) (cameo)
- Can't Lose (2011) (guest appearance, ep 12–13)
- KBS Drama Special – "Hair Show" (2011)
- Quiz of God (2010) (guest appearance, ep 9–10)
- Legend of the Patriots (2010)
- Gourmet (2008)
- I Am Happy (2008)
- MBC Best Theater – "Bong-jae Returns" (2007)
- Get Karl! Oh Soo-jung (2007)
- Capital Scandal (2007)
- 90 Days, Time to Love (2006)
- Secret Campus (2006)
- My Love (2006)
- My Lovely Fool (2006)
- Jumong (2006)
- Sharp 3 (2006)
- Love and Ambition (2006)

=== Film ===
- Half (2014)
- School of Youth: The Corruption of Morals (2014)
- How to Use Guys with Secret Tips (2013)
- Almost Che (2012)
- Officer of the Year (2011)
- Lifting King Kong (2009)
- First Love (2008)

=== Music video appearances ===
- 10cm - "Love is Falling in Drops" (2012)
- Huh Gak - "It Hurts" (2012)
- Huh Gak - "The Person Who Once Loved Me" (2012)
- Acoustic Collabo - "You and Me, Heart Fluttering" (2011)
- 2NB - "Because I'm a Girl" (2007)
