= Goo Jae-Hee =

Goo Jae-Hee or Koo Jae-Hee (Korean: 구재희) may refer to:

- A character in the 2005 Korean drama series Be Strong, Geum-soon!
- A character in the 2012 Korean drama series To the Beautiful You
