= Runway Cop =

- Theatrical poster
- Hangul: 차형사
- Hanja: 車刑事
- RR: Cha hyeongsa
- MR: Ch'a hyŏngsa
- Directed by: Shin Tae-ra
- Written by: Go Young-jae
- Produced by: Go Gil-su; Yun Sang-oh
- Starring: Kang Ji-hwan; Sung Yu-ri; Kim Young-kwang; Lee Soo-hyuk; Lee Hee-joon
- Cinematography: Choi Ju-yeong
- Edited by: Jin Lee
- Music by: Choi Seung-hyun
- Production company: Film Company Hong
- Distributed by: CJ Entertainment
- Release date: May 30, 2012
- Running time: 110 minutes
- Country: South Korea
- Language: Korean

Runway Cop (Korean: 차형사; lit. 'Detective Cha') is a 2012 South Korean action comedy film, starring Kang Ji-hwan and Sung Yu-ri and directed by Shin Tae-ra. It tells the story of an overzealous and overweight detective Cha Cheol-soo who goes undercover as a fashion model in order to solve a case. It reunites the two leads since the television series Hong Gil-dong (2008), and is the second film Kang has worked on with Shin since My Girlfriend Is an Agent (2009).

== Plot ==
Cha Chul-soo is an overzealous and overweight detective who stops at nothing to catch his suspect. He doesn't a waste any precious moment to shower, and dresses in ramshackle and sometimes dirty clothes. However, when another cop was injured and unable to go undercover in the city's biggest criminal cases, he steps up to the plate and accepts the challenge to be transformed into a runway model in 60 days. Among the challenges of losing 20 kilograms in 2 weeks, Cha also have to work with high school alum Ko Young-jae, who is the designer. Convinced he stinks and will ruin her show, she sets him the impossible. With so much to learn in such a short period of time, Cha's case turns into the biggest radical makeover at the hands of fashion designer.

== Cast ==
- Kang Ji-hwan as Detective Cha Chul-soo
  - Park Bo-gum as young Chul-soo
- Sung Yu-ri as Fashion designer Ko Young-jae
- Kim Young-kwang as Han Seung-woo
- Lee Soo-hyuk as Top model Kim Sun-ho
- Lee Hee-joon as Kyung-Seok
- Shin Min-chul as Min-seung
- Seo Jiayu as herself
- Seo Jini as herself
