= Han Sang-jin =

South Korean actor (born 1978)

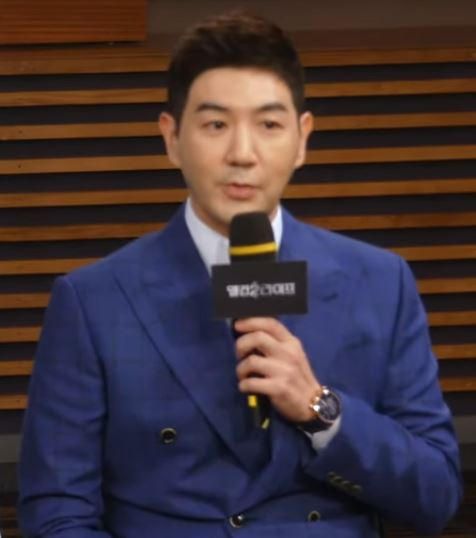
- Han in August 2019
- Born: January 17, 1978 (age 48); Seoul, South Korea
- Education: Seoul Institute of the Arts; Seokyeong University
- Occupation: Actor
- Years active: 1997–present
- Agent: Billions
- Spouse: Park Jung-eun (m. 2004)

Korean name
- Hangul: 한상진
- Hanja: 韓尚進
- RR: Han Sangjin
- MR: Han Sangjin

Han Sang-jin (Korean: 한상진; born January 17, 1978) is a South Korean actor. He is best known for starring in television dramas such as Behind the White Tower (2007), Yi San (2007), My Too Perfect Sons (2009), Marry Me, Please (2010), and The King's Doctor (2012).

== Filmography ==
=== Television series ===
Year	Title	Role
1999	KAIST	Seo Dong-sik
1999	Who Are You	Kim Ki-bae
2001	Wonderful Days	Park Tae-beom
2001	I Still Love You	Secretary Jang
2004	What Happened in Bali	
2004	Proposal	Seung-wook
2005	Golden Apple	
2005	Only You	
2005	Marrying a Millionaire	Assistant director Na Sang-soo
2007	Behind the White Tower	Park Geon-ha
2007	Lee San, Wind of the Palace	Hong Guk-yeong
2009	My Too Perfect Sons	Song Sun-poong
2009	Temptation of an Angel	Shin Hyun-woo
2010	Marry Me, Please	Han Kyung-hoon
2011	Deep Rooted Tree	Shim Jong-soo
2012	The King's Doctor	King Hyeonjong
2013	The Secret of Birth	Choi Ki-tae
2013	Drama Festival "More and More"	Jae-moon
2014	Big Man	Do Sang-ho
2014	Birth of a Beauty	Han Min-hyeok
2015	Hyde Jekyll, Me	Ryu Seung-yeon
2015	Six Flying Dragons	Monk Jukryong
2017	Circle	Park Dong-gun
2018	Mysterious Personal Shopper	Jang Myung Hwan
2018	My Contracted Husband, Mr. Oh	Bang Yong-nim
2019	Haechi	Wi Byung-joo
2019	Welcome 2 Life	Kang Yoon-gi
2020	KBS Drama Special - To My Perpetrator	Mathematics Teacher
2021	Lovers of the Red Sky	Ha Seong-jin (Cameo)
2021	The All-Round Wife	Kang Nam-goo
2022	The Forbidden Marriage	Ahn Ji-hyung (Cameo)
2024	The Judge from Hell	Joo Hyung-seok

=== Film ===
Year	Title	Role
2005	All for Love	Youngest detective
2007	Bank Attack	Stuntman/Bum
2010	Foxy Festival	Delivery man (cameo)
2011	Mama	Boss of Seung-chul's rival gang (cameo)
2012	Code Name: Jackal	Team leader Shin
2014	Twinkle-Twinkle Pitter-Patter (short film)	

=== Television show ===
Year	Title	Role	Notes	Ref.
2010	Hot Brothers	Cast member		
2014	The King of Food	Cast member		
2023	Party Resolution	Host	Season 2	

== Theater ==
Year	Title	Role
2002	King Lear	
2003	Othello	

== Awards and nominations ==
Year	Award	Category	Nominated work	Result
2007	MBC Drama Awards	Best New Actor	Behind the White Tower, Yi San	Won
2008	44th Baeksang Arts Awards	Best New Actor (TV)	Yi San	Nominated
2009	KBS Drama Awards	Best Supporting Actor	My Too Perfect Sons	Nominated
2010	KBS Drama Awards	Excellence Award, Actor in a Daily Drama	Marry Me, Please	Nominated
2012	MBC Drama Awards	Excellence Award, Actor in a Special Project Drama	The King's Doctor	Nominated
2014	SBS Drama Awards	Special Award, Actor in a Drama Special	Birth of a Beauty	Nominated
2018	26th Korea Culture and Entertainment Awards	Excellence Award, Actor in a Drama	Mysterious Personal Shopper	Won
2018	KBS Drama Awards	Excellence Award, Actor in a Daily Drama	Mysterious Personal Shopper	Nominated
2021	KBS Drama Awards	Excellence Award, Actor in a Daily Drama	The All-Round Wife	Nominated
2022	8th APAN Star Awards	Excellence Award, Actor in a Serial Drama	The All-Round Wife	Won
