= Kang Ji-hwan =

South Korean actor (born 1977)

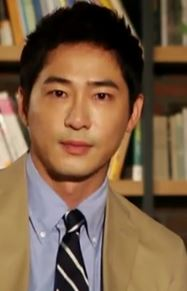
- Kang in March 2016
- Born: Jo Tae-gyu; March 20, 1977 (age 49); Seoul, South Korea
- Occupation: Actor
- Years active: 2002–2019

Korean name
- Hangul: 조태규
- Hanja: 趙太奎
- RR: Jo Taegyu
- MR: Cho T'aegyu

Stage name
- Hangul: 강지환
- Hanja: 姜至煥
- RR: Gang Jihwan
- MR: Kang Chihwan

Kang Ji-hwan (Korean: 강지환; born March 20, 1977), birth name Jo Tae-gyu (조태규), is a South Korean former actor. He began his career in musical theatre, and has since starred in television dramas such as Be Strong, Geum-soon! (2005), Capital Scandal (2007), Hong Gil-dong (2008), Lie to Me (2011), Incarnation of Money (2013), Big Man (2014) and Children of a Lesser God (2018) as well as the films Rough Cut (2008) and My Girlfriend Is an Agent (2009).

== Career ==
=== 2002–2005: Beginnings and rising popularity ===
Jo Tae-gyu made his acting debut in musical theatre in 2002, in the Korean stagings of popular musicals The Rocky Horror Show and Grease. From 2003 to 2004, using the stage name Kang Ji-hwan, he began appearing in small roles on television, which included the sitcom Nonstop 4 and the Korean dramas Summer Scent and Save the Last Dance for Me.

=== 2005–2008: First fame film roles and commercial peak ===
Kang shot to fame in 2005 with Be Strong, Geum-soon!, in his first onscreen leading role as a fastidious doctor who falls for a widowed hairdresser (played by Han Hye-jin). The drama increased his pan-Asian popularity, particularly in Japan, China, and Taiwan. He then made his big screen debut in the role of a Jehovah's Witness who befriends an unemployed professor in the independent film Host and Guest, which traveled the international film festival circuit.

Kang continued acting on television but his 2006 dramas Fireworks, about two cosmetics firm employees who plot revenge against their exes (opposite Han Chae-young), and 90 Days, Time to Love, about a terminally ill married man who's in love with his cousin (opposite Kim Ha-neul), received low viewership ratings. In 2007, he and Han Ji-min starred in Capital Scandal, a period drama adapted from Lee Sun-mi's novel set in Japanese-occupied Korea. His portrayal of a carefree playboy who transforms into an independence fighter garnered positive reviews.

2008 became a successful year for Kang. He was cast as the titular Joseon folk hero in Hong Gil-dong, written by the Hong sisters. Kang said his portrayal was inspired by Stephen Chow, and the fusion-period dramedy became a TV cult hit. Later that year, he also starred in Rough Cut, a low-budget film directed by Jang Hoon and written by Kim Ki-duk about a gangster who wants to become an actor and a hot-tempered star who acts like a thug. Kang and costar So Ji-sub were praised for their performances, and both won several Best New Actor awards.

=== 2009–2012: Commercial success and comeback in film ===
Kang then reunited with previous leading lady Kim Ha-neul in My Girlfriend Is an Agent, a 2009 action-romantic comedy in which their characters are former lovers and spies trying to conceal their professions from each other. It became the fourth highest grossing Korean film of that year, with more than 4 million tickets sold. Afterwards, he played a looks-oriented architect whose eye problem magically causes him to see the homely heroine (played by Lee Ji-ah) as beautiful in The Relation of Face, Mind and Love, a "telecinema" which received a brief theatrical release and a TV run.

In 2010, Kang starred in romantic comedy series Coffee House, in which he played an eccentric novelist who is caught in a love triangle with his publisher (played by Park Si-yeon) and his assistant (played by Ham Eun-jung). This was followed by his return to the stage in the musical revival Cafe In, a love story between a male sommelier and a female barista. Kang produced the show's Korean and Japanese runs, and he also starred in the latter, becoming the first Korean actor to perform at the Tokyo Globe Theatre.

Kang and Yoon Eun-hye then starred in 2011's Lie to Me, playing a hotelier and a civil servant who fake being married to each other after she tells a white lie that quickly spreads through the gossip channels.

The 2012 comedy film Runway Cop reunited him with previous costar Sung Yu-ri (from Hong Gil-dong) and director Shin Tae-ra (from My Girlfriend Is an Agent). During filming, Kang gained 12 kilograms and shed 15 kilograms two weeks later for his role as an overweight and messy detective who goes undercover as a fashion runway model to solve a case. Following that, he and Lee Ki-woo appeared in a 25-minute "music video drama" to promote Kim Hyung-jun's EP Escape.

=== 2013–2015: Success roles ===
In 2013, Kang starred in Incarnation of Money, in the role of a prosecutor with ties to a loan shark. Then in 2014's Big Man, he played a "good-for-nothing" orphan who is tricked into thinking that he is the long-lost eldest son of a wealthy tycoon's family, when they only want to harvest his heart for a transplant.

Kang and Yoon Jin-seo shot the gangster love story Heartbreak Hotel in Los Angeles and Las Vegas, and the indie was released in 2015. He was next cast in the Korean-Chinese romantic comedy A-lister Fall from the Sky, about a scandal-ridden Hallyu star who goes to China and encounters his biggest fan (played by Jiang Yuan).

=== 2016–2017: Other films and later popularity ===
Kang reunited with Hong Gil-dong and Runaway Cop co-star Sung Yu-ri in revenge melodrama Monster, which aired in 2016. In 2018, Kang starred in his first cable drama Children of a Lesser God, playing a genius detective. The same year, he starred in the workplace comedy Feel Good to Die.

=== 2018–2020: Focus on roles and retirement ===
In 2019, Kang starred in the series Joseon Survival Period, but due to sexual assault allegations against him, he was replaced by Seo Ji-seok from episode 11 onward.

== Contract disputes ==
In 2010, Kang was sued for breach of contract by his former talent agency Jambo Entertainment. Kang had signed with S-Plus Entertainment after asking to be released from his contract with Jambo, which the latter claimed was still valid for eight months. S-Plus stated that of the six years that Kang was with Jambo, he was without a contract for three years, and after receiving no response from their overtures regarding Jambo's "unfair terms," they took steps to legally terminate Kang's contract. Upon mediation, the Corea Entertainment Management Association (CEMA) instructed Kang to suspend his entertainment activities for eight months, but when he starred in Coffee House anyway, CEMA members threatened to boycott him unless he dropped out of playing the leading role in Faith.

In 2012, S-Plus Entertainment moved to extend Kang's contract with them for an additional eight months, citing his lack of projects for that same length of time due to CEMA's edict. When Kang refused and began entrusting his business affairs to his lawyer, S-Plus sued him for breach of contract. In 2013, the Seoul Central District Court dismissed the lawsuit and upheld the validity of the original contract; the court also ordered S-Plus to pay Kang ₩5 million in damages after the agency defamed him in the press.

== Sexual assault allegations ==
=== Arrest and sexual content disputes ===
On July 9, 2019, Kang was arrested over allegations that he sexually molested and assaulted two of his agency's female employees at his home. Kang stated that he remembered drinking with them but did not remember what happened afterwards. Kang's agency, Huayi Brothers, issued an apology and sought another actor to replace Kang in his ongoing TV series. On July 15, 2019, Kang admitted to all charges against him and apologized to the victims. Following this, Huayi Brothers terminated their contract with Kang on July 16, 2019 and he decided to retire from the entertainment industry. On July 26, 2019, Kang was indicted on the criminal charges of quasi-rape and quasi-indecent acts by force. During the first trial, in September 2019, it was revealed that Kang had offered the victims a settlement before the trial, but they rejected it.

On December 5, 2019, Kang was found guilty and sentenced to two years and six months imprisonment, suspended for three years of probation, by the Suwon District Court. Kang was also ordered to conduct 120 hours of social service, take part in 40 hours of sexual offender treatment and be restricted from employment for three years.

== Filmography ==
=== Television series ===
Year	Title	Role
2003	MBC Best Theater – "Confession of Murder"	
2003	Summer Scent	Park Jung-ah's husband (episode 20)
2003	Nonstop 4	
2004	More Beautiful Than a Flower	Kim Jae-sik (sticker photo on cellphone)
2004	If You Only Knew	
2004	Save the Last Dance for Me	Shin Jung-kyu
2005	Be Strong, Geum-soon!	Goo Jae-hee
2006	Fireworks	Na In-jae
2006	90 Days, Time to Love	Hyun Ji-seok
2007	Capital Scandal	Sunwoo Wan
2008	Hong Gil-dong	Hong Gil-dong
2010	Coffee House	Lee Jin-soo
2011	Lie to Me	Hyun Ki-joon
2013	Incarnation of Money	Lee Kang-seok / Lee Cha-don
2014	Big Man	Kim Ji-hyuk
2016	Monster	Kang Ki-tan / Lee Guk-cheol
2018	Children of a Lesser God	Cheon Jae-in
2018	Feel Good to Die	Baek Jin-sang
2019	Joseon Survival Period	Han Jung-rok

=== Film ===
Year	Title	Role
2006	Host and Guest	Kye-sang
2008	Rough Cut	Jang Soo-ta
2009	My Girlfriend Is an Agent	Lee Jae-joon
2009	The Relation of Face, Mind and Love	Kang Tae-poong
2012	Runway Cop	Cha Chul-soo
2015	Heartbreak Hotel	John
2015	A-lister Fall from the Sky	Kim Hyun-joon

=== Music video appearance ===
Year	Title	Artist	Notes
2012	"Just Let It Go" / "Bad Guy Thing"	Kim Hyung-jun	From the album Escape

=== Variety show ===
Year	Title	Role
2017	Island Trio	Guest
2018	Real Man 300	Cast

== Musical theatre ==
Year	Title	Role
2002	The Rocky Horror Show	
2004	Grease	Danny Zuko
2010	Cafe In	Jung-min

== Discography ==
=== Soundtrack appearances ===
Year	Song title	Notes
2006	"Just a Person I Know"	Track from Fireworks OST
2011	"Lovin' Ice Cream" (feat. As One)	Track from Lie to Me Japanese OST

== Awards and nominations ==
Year	Award	Category	Nominated work	Result
2005	MBC Drama Awards	Excellence Award, Actor	Be Strong, Geum-soon!	Won
2005	MBC Drama Awards	Best New Actor	Be Strong, Geum-soon!	Won
2005	MBC Drama Awards	Best Couple Award with Han Hye-jin	Be Strong, Geum-soon!	Nominated
2005	MBC Drama Awards	Popularity Award, Actor	Be Strong, Geum-soon!	Nominated
2006	42nd Baeksang Arts Awards	Best New Actor (TV)	Be Strong, Geum-soon!	Nominated
2007	KBS Drama Awards	Excellence Award, Actor in a Miniseries	Capital Scandal	Won
2007	KBS Drama Awards	Best Couple Award with Han Ji-min	Capital Scandal	Won
2007	KBS Drama Awards	Popularity Award, Actor	Capital Scandal	Nominated
2008	44th Baeksang Arts Awards	Best Actor (TV)	Capital Scandal	Nominated
2008	44th Baeksang Arts Awards	Most Popular Actor (TV)	Hong Gil-dong	Won
2008	28th Korean Association of Film Critics Awards	Best New Actor	Rough Cut	Won
2008	29th Blue Dragon Film Awards	Best New Actor	Rough Cut	Won
2008	7th Korean Film Awards	Best New Actor	Rough Cut	Won
2008	KBS Drama Awards	Top Excellence Award, Actor	Hong Gil-dong	Nominated
2008	KBS Drama Awards	Netizen Award, Actor	Hong Gil-dong	Won
2008	KBS Drama Awards	Best Couple Award with Sung Yu-ri	Hong Gil-dong	Won
2009	45th Baeksang Arts Awards	Best New Actor (Film)	Rough Cut	Won
2009	18th Buil Film Awards	Best New Actor	Rough Cut	Nominated
2009	10th Busan Film Critics Awards	Best New Actor	Rough Cut	Won
2009	46th Grand Bell Awards	Best New Actor	My Girlfriend Is an Agent	Won
2009	5th University Film Festival of Korea	Best New Actor	My Girlfriend Is an Agent	Won
2010	SBS Drama Awards	Excellence Award, Actor in a Special Planning Drama	Coffee House	Nominated
2011	6th Seoul International Drama Awards	Outstanding Korean Actor	Coffee House	Nominated
2011	SBS Drama Awards	Excellence Award, Actor in a Special Planning Drama	Lie to Me	Nominated
2013	SBS Drama Awards	Top Excellence Award, Actor in a Drama Special	Incarnation of Money	Nominated
2014	9th Asia Model Awards	Asia Star Award	—N/a	Won
2014	KBS Drama Awards	Top Excellence Award, Actor	Big Man	Nominated
2014	KBS Drama Awards	Excellence Award, Actor in a Miniseries	Big Man	Nominated
2016	5th APAN Star Awards	Best Actor in a serial drama (excellence award)	Monster	Nominated
2016	MBC Drama Awards	Top Excellence Award, Actor in a Special Project Drama	Monster	Nominated
2018	KBS Drama Awards	Excellence Award, Actor in a Miniseries	Feel Good to Die	Nominated
