= Choi Yeo-jin =

South Korean-Canadian actress (born 1983)

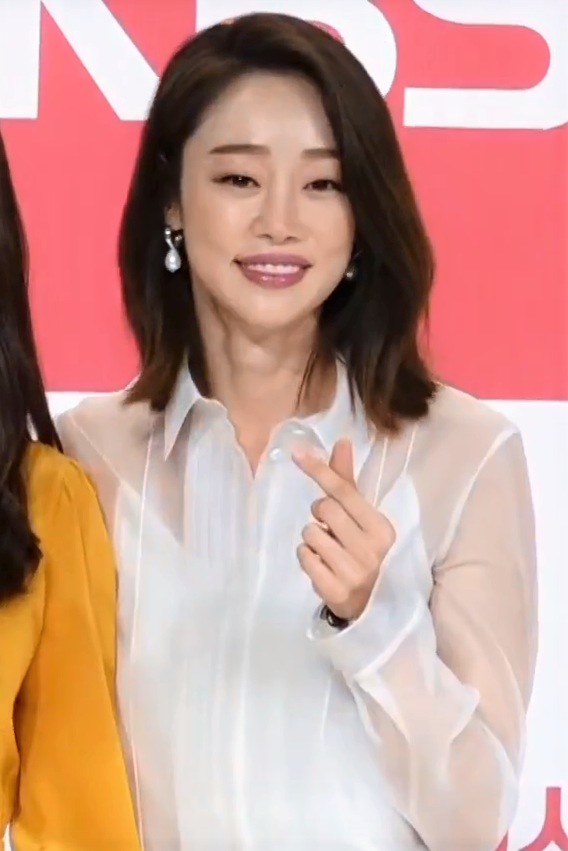
- Choi in 2018
- Born: July 27, 1983 (age 43); Seoul, South Korea
- Education: Hanyang University - Theater and Film
- Occupations: Model; actress
- Years active: 2001–present
- Agent(s): L & Jen Entertainment
- Spouse: Kim Jae-wook (m. 2025)

Korean name
- Hangul: 최여진
- Hanja: 崔汝珍
- RR: Choe Yeojin
- MR: Ch'oe Yŏjin

Choi Yeo-jin (Korean: 최여진; born July 27, 1983) is a South Korean-Canadian model-turned-actress.

== Career ==
Choi Yeo-jin was born in South Korea, but after her parents divorced, they emigrated to Canada when she was in the first year of middle school. She dreamed of becoming a ballerina, but had to give that up after her family went through some financial difficulties.

She debuted in the entertainment business via the Super Elite Model Contest held in Canada in 2001. Choi went on a leave of absence from George Brown College (she was majoring in Hotel Management) to pursue an entertainment career in Korea. She has since starred in several television series, like Dream High 2, and films, notably Surgeon Bong Dal-hee, Golden Bride, My Woman, More Charming by the Day and I Need Romance.

In 2012 she gained popularity due to her stint on reality show Dancing with the Stars, taking the top spot six times out of 11 competitions, and eventually winning. Choi said, "Viewers like my dancing more than my acting. I was kind of frustrated as an actress because I always played the same kind of characters and ended up projecting stereotypes, which could bore viewers. But now I'm much happier because I can turn into a glamorous dancer every time I get on stage."

== Personal life ==
On June 1, 2025, Choi married Kim Jae-wook in a cruise ceremony on the Bukhan River.

== Filmography ==
=== Television series ===
Year	Title	Role	Network
2002	Love Without Obstacle	Choi Yeo-jin	KBS2
2002	Honest Living	Choi Yeo-jin	SBS
2004	I'm Sorry, I Love You	Moon Ji-young	KBS2
2005	Biscuit Teacher and Star Candy	Noh Jem-ma	MBC
2005	Lawyers	Deborah Hong	MBC
2006	The Invisible Man	Jo Hyun-soo	KBS2
2007	Surgeon Bong Dal-hee	Jo A-ra	SBS
2007	Golden Bride	Ok Ji-young	SBS
2007	Capital Scandal	cameo ep 1	KBS
2008	My Woman	Jang Tae-hee	MBC
2009	Dream	Jang Soo-jin	SBS
2010	More Charming by the Day	Im Yeo-jin	MBC
2011	I Need Romance	Park Seo-yeon	tvN
2012	Dream High 2	Ahn Tae-yeon	KBS2
2012	To My Beloved	Baek In-kyung	jTBC
2013	Incarnation of Money	Jeon Ji-hoo	SBS
2014	Emergency Couple	Shim Ji-hye	tvN
2014	Righteous Love	Jang Hee-soo	tvN
2015	Riders: Catch Tomorrow	Ko Tae-Ra	E Channel, Dramacube
2015	The Lover	Choi Jin-nyeo	Mnet
2016	On the Way to the Airport	Song Mi-jin	KBS2
2017	Borg Mom	Boo Ti-Na	MBC
2018	Lovely Horribly	Ki Eun-hyung	KBS2
2020	My Holo Love	Go Yoo-jin	Netflix
2021	Miss Monte-Cristo	Oh Ha-ra	KBS2

=== Film ===
Year	Title	Role
2005	Seoul Raiders	Choi Sun-ah
2005	Love in Magic	herself
2006	Art of Fighting	Young-ae
2006	Detective Mr. Gong	Chinese food delivery girl
2008	Boy Director	Assistant
2015	My Sister, the Pig Lady	Yoo-ja
2017	Yongsoon	English teacher

=== Television show ===
Year	Title	Notes/Ref.
—N/a	Ya Shim Man Man	Panelist
2005–2006	Heroine 6	Cast member
2007–2009	Trend Report Feel: Season 2	Host
2011	Absolute Man: Season 1	Host
2011	Racing Queen: Season 2	Host
2012	Dancing with the Stars: Season 2	Contestant
2012–2013	Follow 美	Host
2013	Saturday Night Live Korea	Host, episode 38
2013	I'm a Super Model	
2013	Super Dog	
2014	A Celebrity Lives in My House	
2014	Chuseok Special: Mirror of Health Returns	Host
2015	The Body Show	Host
2015	Lady Action	Cast member
2015	Headliner	
2016	Law of the Jungle	
2020	Yacht Expedition: The Beginning	Cast
2021–2022	Goal Girl	Cast
2022	Dating is Straight	Host

=== Music video appearances ===
Year	Song title	Artist
2004	"Don't Be Happy"	MC the Max
2004	"A Name Called Parting"	MC the Max
2006	"Love Effect"	Placebo Effect
2009	"Not Even a Call"	Wax
2009	"My Girl"	Brian Joo feat. Supreme Team

== Bibliography ==
Year	Title	Publisher	ISBN
2009	Trendsetter Choi Yeo-jin's; Visual UP Project	Random House Korea	ISBN 9788925535258
2011	Choi Yeo-jin's Aloha Hawaii	Paper Book	ISBN 9788996497301

== Awards and nominations ==
Year	Award	Category	Nominated work	Result
2001	Supermodel Contest Canada (organized by Elite and JoongAng Ilbo)	—N/a	—N/a	Won
2007	SBS Drama Awards	Best Supporting Actress in a Miniseries	Surgeon Bong Dal-hee	Nominated
2007	SBS Drama Awards	New Star Award	Surgeon Bong Dal-hee, Golden Bride	Won
2008	44th Baeksang Arts Awards	Best New Actress (TV)	Golden Bride	Nominated
2008	1st Korea Jewelry Awards	Sapphire Award	—N/a	Won
2010	MBC Entertainment Awards	Excellence Award, Actress in a Sitcom/Comedy	More Charming by the Day	Won
2012	Dancing with the Stars	Season 2 winner	—N/a	Won
2015	4th APAN Star Awards	Best Dressed	—N/a	Won
