= 44th Baeksang Arts Awards =

2008 South Korean award ceremony

- Date: April 24, 2008
- Site: Hae Main Hall, National Theater of Korea

Television coverage
- Network: SBS

The 44th Baeksang Arts Awards ceremony took place on April 24, 2008 at the Hae Main Hall of the National Theater of Korea in Seoul. It was presented by IS Plus Corp. and broadcast on SBS.

== Nominations and winners ==
Complete list of nominees and winners:

(Winners denoted in bold)

=== Film ===
Grand Prize (Film)
**The Chaser**
| Best Film | Best Director (Film) |
| **Forever the Moment**; The Chaser; Happiness; May 18; Secret Sunshine | **Lee Chang-dong** - **Secret Sunshine**; Kim Hyun-seok - Scout; Lee Myung-se - M; Na Hong-jin - The Chaser; Yim Soon-rye - Forever the Moment |
| Best Actor (Film) | Best Actress (Film) |
| **Im Chang-jung** - **Scout**; Byun Hee-bong - The Devil's Game; Ha Jung-woo - The Chaser; Kim Yoon-seok - The Chaser; Song Kang-ho - The Show Must Go On | **Kim Min-hee** - **Hellcats**; Im Soo-jung - Happiness; Jeon Do-yeon - Secret Sunshine; Kim Jung-eun - Forever the Moment; Yunjin Kim - Seven Days |
| Best New Actor (Film) | Best New Actress (Film) |
| **Jang Keun-suk** - **The Happy Life**; Jung Il-woo - My Love; Kim Heung-soo - Hellcats; Jun-seong Kim - West 32nd; Yoo Gun - Kidnapping Granny K | **Han Ye-seul** - **Miss Gold Digger**; Jung Ryeo-won - Two Faces of My Girlfriend; Lee Bo-young - Once Upon a Time; Lee Ha-na - Le Grand Chef; Lee Yeon-hee - M |
| Best New Director (Film) | Best Screenplay (Film) |
| **Na Hong-jin** - **The Chaser**; Jung Sik, Jung Bum-shik - Epitaph; Kim Mee-jung - Shadows in the Palace; Kim Tai-sik - Driving with My Wife's Lover; Ra Hee-chan - Going by the Book | **Kim Hyun-seok** - **Scout**; Kim Han-min - Paradise Murdered; Lee Chang-dong - Secret Sunshine; Na Hong-jin - The Chaser; Na Hyun - Forever the Moment |
| Most Popular - Actor (Film) | Most Popular - Actress (Film) |
| **Kwon Sang-woo** - **Fate** | **Kim Jung-eun** - **Forever the Moment** |

=== Television ===
Grand Prize (Television)
**Kang Ho-dong** - **2 Days & 1 Night**
| Best Drama | Best Director (Television) |
| **War of Money**; Coffee Prince; The Legend; Likeable or Not; My Husband's Woman | **Lee Byung-hoon** - **Yi San**; Jang Tae-yoo - War of Money; Lee Duk-gun - Likeable or Not; Woon Goon-il - Golden Bride; Yoo Chul-yong - H.I.T |
| Best Educational Program | Best Entertainment Program |
| **Asian Corridor in Heaven**; Ganges; Human Documentary: Love; Knowledge Channel e; Master of Living | **Infinite Challenge**; Golden Fishery; Happy Sunday; Happy Together; Star King |
| Best Actor (Television) | Best Actress (Television) |
| **Park Shin-yang** - **War of Money**; Bae Yong-joon - The Legend; Cho Jae-hyun - New Heart; Kang Ji-hwan - Capital Scandal; Lee Seo-jin - Yi San | **Yoon Eun-hye** - **Coffee Prince**; Han Ji-min - Capital Scandal; Kim Hee-ae - My Husband's Woman; Kim Hyun-joo - In-soon Is Pretty; Park Jin-hee - War of Money |
| Best New Actor (Television) | Best New Actress (Television) |
| **Song Chang-eui** - **Golden Bride**; Ha Seok-jin - I Am Happy; Han Sang-jin - Yi San; Kim Ji-seok - Likeable or Not; Lee Phillip - The Legend | **Lee Ji-ah** - **The Legend**; Choi Yeo-jin - Golden Bride; Park Min-young - I Am Sam; Park Shin-hye - Kimcheed Radish Cubes; Yoo In-young - Likeable or Not |
| Best New Director (Television) | Best Screenplay (Television) |
| **Lee Yoon-jung** - **Coffee Prince**; Ham Young-hoon - Evasive Inquiry Agency; Han Joon-seo - Capital Scandal; Lee Myung-woo - Bad Couple; Park Hong-kyun - New Heart | **Lee Kyung-hee** - **Thank You**; Hwang Eun-kyung - New Heart; Jung Yoo-kyung - In-soon Is Pretty; Kim Soo-hyun - My Husband's Woman; Lee Jung-ah - Coffee Prince |
| Best Variety Performer - Male | Best Variety Performer - Female |
| **Park Myeong-su** - **Happy Together**; Kang Ho-dong - 2 Days & 1 Night; Kim Gura - Line Up; Shin Jung-hwan - Happy Sunday; Yoo Jae-suk - Infinite Challenge | **Shin Bong-sun** - **Happy Together**; Hyun Young - Happy Sunday; Jung Joo-ri - People Looking for a Laugh; Jung Sun-hee - TV Animal Farm; Park Kyung-lim - Happy Sunday |
| Most Popular - Actor (Television) | Most Popular - Actress (Television) |
| **Kang Ji-hwan** - **Hong Gil-dong** | **Sung Yu-ri** - **Hong Gil-dong** |

=== Other awards ===
- **Lifetime Achievement Award** - Song Hae
