= Capital Scandal =

2007 South Korean television series

- Promotional poster for Capital Scandal
- Also known as: Scandal in Old Seoul; Scandal in the Capital; Kyeongseong Scandal; Modern Romance
- Genre: Historical; Romance; Comedy; Drama
- Based on: Love Story in the Capital by Lee Sun-mi
- Written by: Jin Soo-wan
- Directed by: Han Joon-seo
- Starring: Kang Ji-hwan; Han Ji-min; Ryu Jin; Han Go-eun
- Music by: Ji Pyeong Kwon
- Country of origin: South Korea
- Original language: Korean
- No. of episodes: 16

Production
- Producers: Jung Sung-hyo; Lee Jung-seob
- Production location: Korea
- Running time: Wednesdays and Thursdays at 21:55 (KST)
- Production company: JS Pictures

Original release
- Network: KBS2
- Release: 6 June – 2 August 2007

Capital Scandal (Korean: 경성 스캔들; RR: Gyeongseong seukaendeul; lit. 'Scandal in Gyeongseong') is a 2007 South Korean television series starring Kang Ji-hwan, Han Ji-min, Ryu Jin, and Han Go-eun. It aired on KBS2 from June 6 to August 2, 2007 on Wednesdays and Thursdays at 21:55 for 16 episodes.

Based on Lee Sun-mi's novel Love Story in the Capital, the story juxtaposes the heroic anti-Japanese movement with young romance by depicting the capital Seoul of the 1930s during colonial rule, at that time called "Keijō" ("Gyeongseong" in Korean; hence its alternate title Scandal in Old Seoul). It was a time when the nation's independence fighters fought against pro-Japanese traitors, while traditional Joseon-era Confucian values clashed and coexisted with a more modern way of life. The series portrays one of the darkest periods of Korean history with a mixture of tragedy, comedy and romance.

== Synopsis ==
Sunwoo Wan (Kang Ji-hwan) is one of the capital's most notorious womanizers who alleges that he can seduce any woman within 10 minutes. The handsome, fashionable and rich young man doesn't have worries about the fate of his country. He gambles with his colleagues on his ability to seduce Na Yeo-kyung (Han Ji-min), whose nickname is "Jomaja" (the last woman of the Joseon period). She is known as a woman who doesn't care about her appearance and has no interest at all in dating. She runs a small bookstore while working as a volunteer teacher for poor children. Yeo-kyung is a very determined woman, and she has strong faith that her country will be liberated from Japan in the near future. Dating a guy or getting married is something she'll do only after the independence of her native land.

At first Wan doesn't take his bet seriously, but as events escalate in the capital, he finds himself falling in love with Yeo-kyung. She opens his eyes to the social injustices around him, which transforms him into becoming an independence movement activist himself. As Wan says, "Love is the strongest and most effective strategy for independence and revolution."

== Cast ==
=== Main characters ===
- Kang Ji-hwan as Sunwoo Wan

A thoroughly "modern boy," Sunwoo Wan is always dressed fashionably in the latest trends, and likes jazz, gambling and women. He frequents the night clubs and has his face splashed on the tabloids. The most famous playboy in Gyeongseong, Wan is confident that it takes him only ten minutes to seduce a girl. One day he makes a bet that he will break his record by seducing not some pretty and sophisticated girl, but the prudish independence fighter nicknamed Jomaja. What begins as false love later evolves into genuine feelings. He experiences real love for the first time, which later evolves into patriotism. The former hedonist turns into an enthusiastic independence fighter.

- Han Ji-min as Na Yeo-kyung

Unlike most young women of the era, though Yeo-kyung received an advanced education, she still prioritizes pre-modern moral values. She still wears a traditional white blouse and a black skirt. She is strong-willed and stubborn — to the extent that she makes others want to challenge her. Many young men have tried to approach her, but failed. Rumor has it that she scolded one man for a full hour for daring to ask her out. That's why Gyeongseong guys have given up on her; they just sarcastically and disparagingly call her Jomaja, meaning "the last woman of Joseon."

- Ryu Jin as Lee Soo-hyun

Having received an elite education in Tokyo, Soo-hyun has outstanding work abilities, good manners and neat looks. He quickly climbs up the promotion ladder at the Japanese government in Korea, and everybody knows that Japanese high-ranking official Ueda Mamoru fully trusts and relies on him. But as talented as he is, Soo-hyun also has many enemies, including his Japanese coworkers, Korean underlings, and even his childhood friend Sunwoo Wan. He merely ignores people who accuse him of betraying his country. His face is always expressionless and doesn't betray his secrets, and he only smiles briefly at decisive moments.

- Han Go-eun as Cha Song-joo

A famous gisaeng, Song-joo has spellbinding looks that can charm anyone, and enviable skills at dancing and singing. Only men of high social status can meet with her. Those who don't have enough money or power to meet with her in person can hear her songs on Gyeongseong Radio or see her smiling face on Japanese government PR posters hanging at the train station. Song-joo is the top celebrity of the era when there were no entertainers in Joseon yet.

=== Supporting characters ===
- Kang Nam-gil as Kim Tak-goo
- Lee Kyung-jin as Choi Hak-hee
- Ahn Yong-joon as Kang In-ho
- Yoon Gi-won as Lee Kang-goo
- Ahn Suk-hwan as Ueda Mamoru
- Choi Phillip as Yamashita Kouji
- Kim Hye-ok as Ueda Sachiko
- Park Ha-sun as So Young-rang
- Yoon Joo-sang as Sunwoo Kwan
- Yoon Ye-hee as Heo Young-hwa
- Heo Jeong-min as Shin Se-ki
- Go Myung-hwan as Wang Gol
- Jang Tae-sung as Chu Geun-deok
- Seo Hyun-ki as Mang-chi
- Uhm Hyun-kyung as Ueda Miyuki
- Choi Yeo-jin (cameo, ep 1)

== Original soundtrack ==
1. Gyeongseong Scandal - Eru
2. Because of you - Jeon So-young
3. Elegy
4. Dance with me
5. You who believe this is the end - Jay
6. No Life Without You (feat. Soseol)
7. Winds of Gyeongseong
8. Gyeongseong Scandal (Inst.)
9. Sweet Song - Noh Jin-young
10. Gyeongseong BLUES
11. Mong (dream)
12. Waltz of Destiny
13. Elegy Tango
14. You who believe this is the end (Inst.)
15. One Summer
16. Because of you (Inst.)
17. In a Mood

== Awards and nominations ==
Year	Award	Category	Recipient	Result
2007	KBS Drama Awards	Excellence Award, Actor in a Miniseries	Kang Ji-hwan	Won
2007	KBS Drama Awards	Excellence Award, Actress in a Miniseries	Han Ji-min	Won
2007	KBS Drama Awards	Excellence Award, Actress in a Miniseries	Han Go-eun	Nominated
2007	KBS Drama Awards	Best Supporting Actor	Kang Nam-gil	Nominated
2007	KBS Drama Awards	Best Supporting Actress	Han Go-eun	Won
2007	KBS Drama Awards	Best Young Actor	Choi Woo-hyuk	Won
2007	KBS Drama Awards	Netizen Award, Actress	Han Ji-min	Won
2007	KBS Drama Awards	Popularity Award, Actor	Kang Ji-hwan	Nominated
2007	KBS Drama Awards	Popularity Award, Actress	Han Ji-min	Nominated
2007	KBS Drama Awards	Best Couple Award	Kang Ji-hwan and Han Ji-min	Won
2008	44th Baeksang Arts Awards	Best Actor (TV)	Kang Ji-hwan	Nominated
2008	44th Baeksang Arts Awards	Best Actress (TV)	Han Ji-min	Nominated
2008	44th Baeksang Arts Awards	Best New Director (TV)	Han Joon-seo	Nominated
2008	Banff World Media Festival	Rockie Award	Capital Scandal	Won
