= Big Man (TV series) =

- Genre: Melodrama, Suspense
- Written by: Choi Jin-won
- Directed by: Ji Young-soo
- Starring: Kang Ji-hwan; Choi Daniel; Lee Da-hee; Jung So-min
- Music by: Kim Joon-seok; Jeong Se-rin
- Country of origin: South Korea
- Original language: Korean
- No. of episodes: 16

Production
- Executive producer: Jung Hae-ryong
- Producers: Ji Byung-hyun; Park Woo-ram
- Running time: 60 minutes
- Production companies: Kim Jong-hak Production; KBS Media

Original release
- Network: KBS2
- Release: April 28 – June 17, 2014

Big Man (Korean: 빅맨; RR: Bingmaen) is a 2014 South Korean television series starring Kang Ji-hwan, Choi Daniel, Lee Da-hee, and Jung So-min. It aired on KBS2 from April 28 to June 17, 2014, for 16 episodes.

== Plot ==
Kim Ji-hyuk grew up a penniless orphan and lived a "third-rate life" before deciding to turn himself around and work himself to the bone, with humble dreams of owning his own restaurant. He gets entangled in a plan to save the life of Kang Dong-seok, a chaebol heir who needs a heart transplant, and is told that he is Dong-seok's older brother and begins a lavish new life in that world... and then later learns that it was all a lie. Disgusted with the corruption of his chaebol "family" and spurred on by hatred of the world's unfair realities, Ji-hyuk embarks on a reckless revenge mission in order to protect himself and those he loves.

== Cast ==
=== Main characters ===
- Kang Ji-hwan as Kim Ji-hyuk
  - Lee Tae-woo as young Ji-hyuk

He is born a penniless orphan and grows up to be an uneducated, poor, "trash-like" man. His life changes when he is tricked into believing that he is the long-lost eldest son of a rich, chaebol family, but everything he's told turns out to be lies. Actually Ji-hyuk is not related to them at all, and the family only wanted to circumvent the transplant program and make him the heart donor for his supposed brother Kang Dong-seok, the real heir.

- Choi Daniel as Kang Dong-seok
  - Nam Da-reum as young Dong-seok

Outwardly friendly and congenial, Dong-seok is a two-faced and cunning businessman who doesn't hesitate to do whatever it takes to survive in business. As the only son and heir to the Hyunsung Group, he readily accepts his future as leader of Korea's most powerful business conglomerate. However, his ascent to power is complicated by a business rival, Kim Ji-hyuk.

- Lee Da-hee as So Mi-ra

The daughter of the chauffeur of Hyunsung Group, and manager of the in-house staff. She gets involved in an effort to save Dong-seok's life, who loves her despite the difference in their social class. But Mi-ra eventually falls for Ji-hyuk, and winds up secretly aiding him on his mission.

- Jung So-min as Kang Jin-ah

Dong-seok's younger sister. A badly behaved, self-centered heiress, Jin-ah is used to getting her own way, until she falls in unrequited love with Ji-hyuk.

=== Supporting characters ===
- Song Ok-sook as Hong Dal-sook
- Jang Tae-sung as Yang Dae-sub
- Kwon Hae-hyo as Gu Deok-gyu
- Kim Ji-hoon as Choi Yoo-jae
- Lee Dae-yeon as Kim Han-doo
- Jang Hang-sun as Jo Hwa-soo
- Kim Dae-ryung as Jo Beom-shik
- Yoon So-hee as So Hye-ra
- Kim Mi-kyung as Ahn Bong-rim
- Um Hyo-sup as Kang Sung-wook
- Cha Hwa-yeon as Choi Yoon-jung
- Han Sang-jin as Do Sang-ho
- Lee Hae-woo as Moon Myung-ho
- Na Seung-ho as Assistant Manager Lee
- Choi Jung-hwa as journalist
- Lee Sung-min as high-ranking executive (cameo)
- Park Won-sang as homicide detective (cameo)
- Song Jae-rim as Park Dong-pal (cameo)
- Oh Sang-jin as news anchor
- Jung Myung-joon as lawyer
- Kim Min-jae as Prosecutor Yong
- Jung Dong-gyu as judge
- Kim Seung-wook
- Jang Seong-Beom as Physician

== Ratings ==
Episode #	Original broadcast date	Average audience share			
Episode #	Original broadcast date	TNmS Ratings		AGB Nielsen	
Episode #	Original broadcast date	Nationwide	Seoul National Capital Area	Nationwide	Seoul National Capital Area
1	28 April 2014	5.2%	6.0%	6.0%	6.0%
2	29 April 2014	4.4%	4.9%	4.8%	5.4%
3	5 May 2014	6.2%	6.6%	8.0%	8.3%
4	6 May 2014	7.7%	9.4%	8.2%	9.2%
5	12 May 2014	6.9%	7.1%	9.7%	10.5%
6	13 May 2014	6.1%	6.1%	8.0%	8.8%
7	19 May 2014	6.4%	7.1%	8.1%	8.5%
8	20 May 2014	8.4%	9.1%	9.0%	9.8%
9	26 May 2014	8.8%	9.7%	10.3%	10.6%
10	27 May 2014	8.7%	8.7%	11.2%	11.5%
11	2 June 2014	8.0%	8.8%	10.0%	10.9%
12	3 June 2014	9.0%	10.0%	11.4%	13.2%
13	9 June 2014	8.3%	8.9%	10.7%	12.2%
14	10 June 2014	8.0%	9.3%	10.3%	11.2%
15	16 June 2014	8.1%	9.0%	10.8%	12.3%
16	17 June 2014	8.5%	9.4%	12.6%	14.0%
Average		7.4%	8.1%	9.3%	10.2%

== Awards and nominations ==
Year	Award	Category	Recipient	Result
2014	KBS Drama Awards	Top Excellence Award, Actor	Kang Ji-hwan	Nominated
2014	KBS Drama Awards	Excellence Award, Actor in a Miniseries	Choi Daniel	Nominated
2014	KBS Drama Awards	Excellence Award, Actor in a Miniseries	Kang Ji-hwan	Nominated
2014	KBS Drama Awards	Excellence Award, Actress in a Miniseries	Lee Da-hee	Nominated
2014	KBS Drama Awards	Popularity Award, Actress	Lee Da-hee	Won

== International broadcast ==
Country	Network(s)/Station(s)	Series premiere	Title
Thailand	PPTV	January 5, 2015	หัวใจและไฟแค้น (Huajai Lae Fai Can; literally: Heart & Revenge Fire)
Vietnam	HTV2	February 18, 2016	Kẻ thế mạng
