= Jung Eun-pyo =

South Korean actor (born 1966)

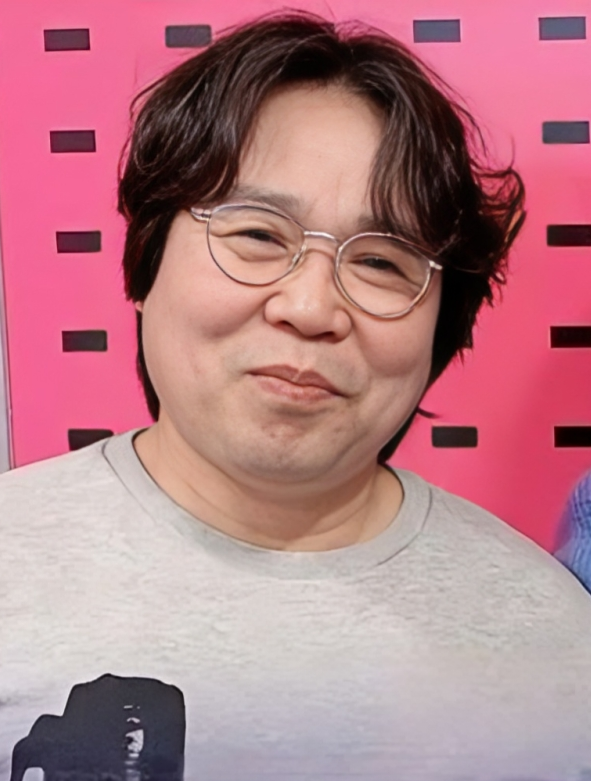
- Jung in February 2021
- Born: March 27, 1966 (age 60); Gokseong County, South Jeolla Province, South Korea
- Education: Seoul Institute of the Arts - Theater
- Occupation: Actor
- Years active: 1990–present
- Spouse: Kim Ha-yan
- Children: 3

Korean name
- Hangul: 정은표
- Hanja: 鄭殷杓
- RR: Jeong Eunpyo
- MR: Chŏng Ŭnp'yo

Jung Eun-pyo (Korean: 정은표; born March 27, 1966) is a South Korean actor. He is active in both stage and screen since 1990, notably in the film Kilimanjaro (for which he won Best Supporting Actor at the Grand Bell Awards) and the television dramas Moon Embracing the Sun and God's Gift: 14 Days.

== Filmography ==
=== Film ===
Year	Title	Role
1990	Ggok-Ji-Ddan	
1994	Sado Sade Impotence	Eunuch
1996	The Real Man	Motel samdoli
1996	Do You Believe in Jazz?	Eschatologist
1999	Phantom: The Submarine	981
2000	The Happy Funeral Director	Gong Dae-shik
2000	Kilimanjaro	Sergeant
2002	Four Toes	Bartender
2002	Bet On My Disco	Gigolo
2002	Break Out	Reservist friend (cameo)
2002	Family	
2002	Survival Game (short film from the Jeonju Digital Project After War)	
2003	Show Show Show	Yong-man
2003	Into the Mirror	Kim Il-hwan
2003	Natural City	Croy
2004	DMZ	Corporal Kwon Hae-ryong
2005	Mapado	Mr. Kang (cameo)
2005	Princess Aurora	Lock picker (cameo)
2006	Sunflower	Doctor (cameo)
2007	A Good Day to Have an Affair	Clerk at motel counter
2007	Le Grand Chef	Ho-seong
2008	Heartbreak Library	Pharmacist
2013	The Hero	Director of Thunder Man
2021	Go Back (Independent film)	Lee Byung-hoon
TBA	PIT	Do-hun (Short Film)

=== Television series ===
Year	Title	Role
2000	Golbangi	
2000	Drama City "Ice City"	
2001	Tender Hearts	Han Pil-jae
2001	Morning Without Parting	Ji Seok-joo
2002	Waves	Jo Il-gu
2002	Loving You	Do Hyung-geun
2003	Wife	Park Dal-soo
2003	Dal-joong's Cinderella	Shim Ki-bong
2004	Jang Gil-san	Go Dal-geun
2004	Immortal Admiral Yi Sun-sin	Dae-man
2005	Loveholic	Han Young-gil
2005	HDTV Literature "Who Murdered Kurt Cobain?"	Dong-chan
2006	Over the Rainbow	Mang-ji
2006	Drama City "Scrubber No. 3"	Joon-tae
2006	Drama City "Blockhead's Quadratic Equation"	Seok-doo
2007	Catching Up with Gangnam Moms	Lee Tae-gu
2007	How to Meet a Perfect Neighbor	Mr. Choi
2008	Hong Gil-dong	Monk Hye-myung
2008	The Great King, Sejong	Slave
2008	HDTV Literature "Spring, Spring Spring"	
2008	My Cop	Jung Eun-pyo
2008	You Stole My Heart	Nam Han-gu
2008	Lawyers of the Great Republic of Korea	Company president Moon
2008	Hometown Legends "Oh Gu the Exorcism"	Mak-seok
2008	Tazza	Painter Jo
2009	Dream	Reporter Joo (cameo)
2009	Invincible Lee Pyung Kang	Lee Jang
2009	High Kick Through the Roof	Jung Eun-pyo (cameo)
2010	Dong Yi	Ge Dwo-ra's father
2010	Grudge: The Revolt of Gumiho	Gumiho's husband
2010	Quiz of God	Gynecologist (guest, episode 6)
2010	Ang Shim Jung	Lee Ja-chool
2011	Sign	Kim Wan-tae
2011	Paradise Ranch	Company president Yang
2011	KBS Drama Special "Hair Show"	Cameraman
2012	Moon Embracing the Sun	Hyung-sun
2012	Dr. Jin	Heo Gwang
2012	The Innocent Man	Manager Jung (cameo)
2012	KBS Drama Special "A Spoonbill Flies Away"	Young-hae
2013	Incarnation of Money	Hwang Jang-shik
2013	Hur Jun, The Original Story	Im Oh-geun
2013	Let's Eat	Police officer (cameo, episode 14)
2013	My Love from the Star	Yoon Sung-dong (cameo, episode 6); Yoon Sung-dong's descendant (cameo, episode 12)
2014	God's Gift: 14 Days	Ki Dong-ho
2014	Angel Eyes	High school teacher (cameo)
2014	You Are My Destiny	Company president Park
2015	OK Family	Han-soo
2015	Kill Me, Heal Me	American psychiatrist (cameo, episode 1)
2015	All About My Mom	Manager Yang
2016	Flowers of the Prison	Ji Cheon-deuk
2018	Top Star U-back	Kim Gook-seop
2020	Mystic Pop-up Bar	Choi Seok-pan (cameo)
2020	Dinner Mate	Woo In-ho
2020	When I Was the Most Beautiful	Lee Kyeong-Sik
2021	River Where the Moon Rises	Uhm-deuk
2021	The Devil Judge	Doh Young-choon (Cameo, Episode 7)
2021	Work Later, Drink Now	Ahn So-hee's Father
2022	Café Minamdang	Kim Cheol-geun
2022	Today's Webtoon	Mo Young-soo
2023	Stealer: The Treasure Keeper	Choi Song-cheol

=== Web series ===
Year	Title	Role
2019	IN SEOUL	Seo Ho-pil
2020	IN SEOUL 2	Dong Ho-pil

=== Variety show ===
Year	Title	Notes
2012	Star Junior Show	Host

=== Music video appearances ===
Year	Song title	Artist
2006	"The Song"	Velvet Glove
2007	Already One Year (벌써1년)	Brown Eyes

== Theater ==
Year	Title	Role
1990	Unsangak (An Arbor Over the Clouds)	
	Baekma River in the Moonlight	
	Chun-pung's Wife	
	Vinyl House	
	Tae (The Life Cord)	
	Mother	
	Bieonso	
	Come and See Me	
	Story of Old Thieves	
1995	Heotang (Fruitless)	
2004	Barber Park Bong-gu	
2008	Do You Know the Milky Way?	
2010	Sanae Watanabe	Park Man-chun/Watanabe
2013-2014	Thursday Romance	Seo Jung-min

== Awards and nominations ==
Year	Award	Category	Nominated work	Result
1995	31st Baeksang Arts Awards	Best New Actor (Theater)		Won
1995	31st Dong-A Theatre Awards	Best Actor	Vinyl House	Won
2000	21st Blue Dragon Film Awards	Best Supporting Actor	Kilimanjaro	Nominated
2001	38th Grand Bell Awards	Best Supporting Actor	Kilimanjaro	Won
2006	KBS Drama Awards	Best Actor in a One-Act/Special/Short Drama	Blockhead's Quadratic Equation	Won
2012	SBS Entertainment Awards	Best Family Award	Bungeo-ppang	Won
2012	MBC Drama Awards	Golden Acting Award, Actor	Moon Embracing the Sun, Dr. Jin	Nominated
2012	MBC Drama Awards	Best Couple Award with Kim Soo-hyun	Moon Embracing the Sun	Nominated
