= Lee Jae-yong (actor) =

South Korean actor

- Born: March 21, 1963 (age 63); Chuncheon, Gangwon Province, South Korea
- Education: Pusan National University - Philosophy
- Occupation: Actor
- Years active: 1987–present
- Agent: Dell Media
- Spouse: Kim Hyeon-ah

Korean name
- Hangul: 이재용
- Hanja: 李在龍
- RR: I Jaeyong
- MR: I Chaeyong

Lee Jae-yong (born March 21, 1963) is a South Korean actor. Best known as a character actor, Lee has played supporting roles in film and television, notably as a dogged ex-detective in Jang Joon-hwan's Save the Green Planet! (2003) and an embezzling Joseon politician in Detective K: Secret of the Virtuous Widow (2011).

== Filmography ==
=== Film ===
Year	Title	Role
1997	3PM Paradise Bath House	Manhwabang owner
1997	Wind Echoing in My Being	Cho Sang-hwa
1999	Dr. K	Mental hospital patient
2001	Friend	"Blade scar"
2002	The Bird Who Stops in the Air	Professor Lee
2002	No Comment	Cafe clerk
2002	Dig or Die	Bong-chang
2002	Birth of a Man	Mr. Choi
2002	Baby Alone	Dong-chul
2003	Save the Green Planet!	Detective Choo
2003	A Man Who Went to Mars	Lee Seung-jae's father (cameo)
2006	Love Phobia	Ari's uncle, a monk
2006	Monopoly	(cameo)
2006	Fly, Daddy, Fly	
2006	Dasepo Naughty Girls	Teacher
2007	Who's That Knocking at My Door?	Street vendor 2
2007	Matjjang	Prosecutor Jeon
2008	Heartbreak Library	Chairman Song (cameo)
2008	4 Days	Ko Kyeong-tae
2010	The Quiz Show Scandal	Academic 2
2011	Detective K: Secret of the Virtuous Widow	Minister Im
2012	Chubby Revolution	Fortune-teller (cameo)
2013	My Paparotti	Gang boss
2015	Empire of Lust	Jeong Do-jeon
2015	The Classified File	Fortuneteller Baek
2017	Steel Rain	Park Kwang-dong
2019	Black Money	CEO (cameo)
2020	Pawn	Head of brothers
2024	About Family	Venerable Jeokjeong
TBA	Stay	Dong Su
TBA	The Mujeogang	

=== Television series ===
Year	Title	Role	Notes/Ref.
2001	Piano	Dok-sa	
2002	Rustic Period	Miwa	
2003	Go, Mom, Go!		
2004	Into the Storm	Kim Ki-ho	
2004	Emperor of the Sea	Jo Sang-gil	
2005	5th Republic	Lee Hak-bong	
2006	Jumong	Bu Deuk-bul	
2006	90 Days, Time to Love	Hyun Ji-seok's father	
2007	War of Money	Oh Jae-bong	
2007	Lee San, Wind of the Palace	Jang Tae-woo	
2007	Lobbyist	Jang Tae-sung	
2008	Love Marriage	Cash King	
2008	Tazza	Stanley Hwang	
2009	Friend, Our Legend	Sang-gon	
2009	Swallow the Sun	Hyun Ki-sang	
2009	Hot Blood	Song Man-deuk	
2009	Detective Mr. Lee		
2010	A Man Called God	Hwang Dal-soo	
2010	Dong Yi	Jang Ik-heon	Cameo
2010	Sungkyunkwan Scandal	Ha Woo-kyu	
2010	Big Thing	Gong Sung-jo	
2010	Athena: Goddess of War	Kim Ho-bin	
2011	Romance Town	Kang Tae-won	
2011	Deep Rooted Tree	Jo Mal-saeng	
2011	Vampire Prosecutor	Paint shop owner	Cameo (episode 8)
2011	Bolder By the Day	Lee Jae-yong	
2012	My Husband Got a Family	Chun Jae-yong's father	Cameo
2012	Man from the Equator	Choi Kwang-chun	
2012	Lovers of Haeundae	Lee Soon-shin	
2012	Can We Get Married?	Dong-bi's father	
2012	Jeon Woo-chi	So-chil	
2013	Hur Jun, The Original Story	Kim Min-se	
2013	The Fugitive of Joseon	Chun-bong	
2013	Master's Sun	Lee Yong-jae	Cameo (episode 11)
2013	Empress Ki	Wang Go	
2014	Three Days	Choi Ji-hoon	
2014	My Dear Cat	Yeom Byung-soo	
2014	Diary of a Night Watchman	Park Soo-jong	
2015	The Jingbirok: A Memoir of Imjin War	Yi San-hae	
2015	KBS Drama Special – "Looking for Argenta"	Nam Ki-seok	
2016	KBS TV Novel – "That Sun in the Sky"	Nam Tae-joon	
2016	Night Light	Park Moo-sam	
2017	Stranger	Kim Nam-jin	
2018	Children of a Lesser God	Kook Han-joo	
2021	Bossam: Steal the Fate	Lee Yi-cheom	
2022	The Law Cafe	Choi Yeo-hwan	Cameo (episode 13)

=== Variety show ===
Year	Title	Network	Role	Notes/Ref.
2016	King of Mask Singer	MBC	Contestant as "Trail of Memories Taffy Peddler"	(episode 67)
2021	Legendary Actors	KBS2	Main Cast	Chuseok special program
2022	People of the Health Office	MBN	Host	

== Awards and nominations ==
Year	Award	Category	Nominated work	Result
2008	16th Korean Culture and Entertainment Awards	모범연예인상		Won
2010	SBS Drama Awards	Best Supporting Actor in a Drama Special	Daemul	Won
2012	KBS Drama Awards	Best Supporting Actor	Man from the Equator, Jeon Woo-chi	Nominated
