= Incarnation of Money =

- Promotional poster
- Genre: Dramedy; Crime
- Written by: Jang Young-chul; Jung Kyung-soon
- Directed by: Yoo In-shik
- Starring: Kang Ji-hwan; Park Sang-min; Hwang Jung-eum; Oh Yoon-ah; Choi Yeo-jin; Kim Soo-mi
- Composer: Ha Geun-young
- Country of origin: South Korea
- Original language: Korean
- No. of episodes: 24

Production
- Executive producer: Han Jung-hwan (SBS)
- Producers: Joo Dongmin; Lee Young jun
- Cinematography: Lee Gil-bok
- Editors: Jo In-hyung; Im Ho-chul
- Running time: 60 minutes
- Production company: JS Pictures

Original release
- Network: SBS TV
- Release: February 2 – April 21, 2013

Incarnation of Money (Korean: 돈의 화신; Hanja: 돈의 化身; RR: Donui hwasin) is a 2013 South Korean television series about greed, ambition, and love. Starring Kang Ji-hwan, Park Sang-min, Hwang Jung-eum, Oh Yoon-ah, Choi Yeo-jin and Kim Soo-mi, it aired on SBS TV from February 2 to April 21, 2013 on Saturdays and Sundays at 22:00 for 24 episodes.

== Plot ==
Lee Cha-don grew up in an orphanage and became a prosecutor, one of the most respected professions in Korea. But, as it turns out, it also can be one of the most corrupt professions, with plenty of opportunities to shake down gamblers and pocket some extra cash. With no memories of his past, Cha-don's fate is inextricably tied with Bok Jae-in, the daughter of a loan shark who funded Cha-don's upbringing and education, and wants to be repaid for the investment. Ji Se-kwang, a senior prosecutor who is responsible for the trajectory of Cha-don's life, pretends to be a righteous prosecutor while hiding the misdeeds of his past.

In 1998, a wealthy businessman, Lee Joong Man, was killed by Ji Se-kwang, and all his property went to his mistress Eun Bi Riyeong (later: Angelina). Lee Joong Man's wife, Park Gi Soo, was accused for that murder, and sentenced to prison. After Park Gi Soo was imprisoned, Lee Joong Man's son, Lee Kang Seok (later: Lee Cha-don) having nowhere to go, went to Ji Se-kwang' apartment, and discovered that Ji Se-kwang was having an affair with Eun Bi Riyeong, and that both conspired to murder Lee Joong Man. Lee Kang Seok then told the lawyer and a reporter who was involved in the murder case about the truth, but both of them were bribed by Ji Se-kwang and stayed silent. Ji Se-kwang, in order to cover all his crimes, tried to kill Lee Kang Seok. Lee Kang Seok, while running away from Ji Se-kwang, was hit by a car, and lost his memory. The person who hit him, Madam Bok Hwa Sool took pity on him and adopted him. When the prosecution office raided Hwa Sool's residence for the ledgers of her illegal dealings, Kang Seok stumped upon the book and discarded the ledger before the prosecutors can acquire it. It is revealed that he has photographic memory, which enabled him to memorize the entire book in record time and discard the ledger after comprehending the content. Seeing his potential, Hwa Sool wanted to make Lee Kang Seok as the official member of her family but Kang Seok disagreed so she was forced to send him to the orphanage and watched over him. Over time, she funded Kang Seok's studies and wished that he would become a prosecutor to become her asset.

Ji Se-kwang, who killed Lee Joong Man, and plotted the whole murder, lives as a respected, righteous prosecutor. Lee Joong Man's mistress, Eun Bi Riyeong, went to the USA after the murder case was closed. Both the lawyer and the reporter live successfully and become famous people in Korea.

It is 2013, and Lee Kang Seok/Lee Cha-don now works as a prosecutor. He learns about his past, and tries to take revenge on five people: Ji Se-kwang, Eun Bi Riyeong/Angelina, the lawyer (Prosecutor Kwon Jae-gyu), the reporter (Reporter Go), and Lee Joong Man's lawyer (Hwang Jang Shik).

== Cast ==
Main characters

- Kang Ji-hwan - Lee Cha-don/ Lee Kang-seok
  - Park Ji-bin - young Kang-seok
- Park Sang-min - Ji Se-kwang
- Hwang Jung-eum - Bok Jae-in
  - Seo Shin-ae - young Jae-in
- Oh Yoon-ah - Eun Bi-ryung
- Choi Yeo-jin - Jeon Ji-hoo
- Kim Soo-mi - Bok Hwa-sool

Supporting characters

- Park Soon-chun - Park Ki-soon, Kang-seok's mother
- Lee Ki-young - Kwon Jae-kyu
- Jung Eun-pyo - Hwang Jang-shik
- Lee Seung-hyung - Go Ho
- Yang Hyung-wook - Yang Goo-shik
- Kim Hak-chul - Jung Hae-ryong
- Choi Jin-ho - Lee Kwan-soo
- Do Ji-han - Kwon Hyuk
- Lee Byung-joon - Jo Sang-deuk
- Yoon Yong-hyun - Kim Pal-do
- Joo Hyun - Lee Joong-man, Kang-seok's father
- Lee Ji-hyun - Hong Ja-mong
- Go In-beom - Kang-seok's uncle
- Seo Dong-kyun - Secretary Seo
- Son Byong-ho
- Jo Woo-jin

Guest appearances

- Song Kyung-chul - Gentleman of Jingogae, Jae-in's father/Hwa-sool's ex-husband
- Noh Hyung-wook - Jae-in's math tutor (ep 3)
- Lee Han-wi - plastic surgeon (ep 5)
- Lee Moon-sik - Park So-tae (ep 9)
- Kim Byeong-ok - nursing home director (ep 11)
- Choi Jong-ryul - Ji Man-ho, Se-kwang's father (ep 15)
- Kim Kwang-in - Yellow Sea Credit Union's major stakeholder
- Maeng Bong-hak - Yellow Sea Credit Union's major stakeholder
- Choi Sang-hoon - Jeon Hoon, Ji-hoo's father

== Ratings ==
Ep.	Original broadcast date	Average audience share			
Ep.	Original broadcast date	TNmS		AGB Nielsen	
Ep.	Original broadcast date	Nationwide	Seoul	Nationwide	Seoul
1	2 February 2013	9.2%	10.0%	9.7%	10.6%
2	3 February 2013	7.6%	8.4%	9.2%	10.2%
3	9 February 2013	11.0%	12.3%	10.2%	10.7%
4	10 February 2013	10.7%	11.1%	10.6%	12.3%
5	16 February 2013	14.1%	14.9%	14.5%	16.6%
6	17 February 2013	13.0%	13.8%	13.1%	15.2%
7	23 February 2013	13.9%	15.3%	13.3%	15.0%
8	24 February 2013	11.7%	12.8%	13.4%	15.1%
9	2 March 2013	13.3%	14.2%	12.2%	14.0%
10	3 March 2013	10.9%	11.6%	11.4%	12.8%
11	9 March 2013	12.4%	13.7%	12.4%	13.8%
12	10 March 2013	11.8%	13.1%	15.1%	16.5%
13	16 March 2013	13.2%	14.7%	14.5%	16.6%
14	17 March 2013	13.0%	14.3%	15.3%	17.5%
15	23 March 2013	14.1%	16.0%	16.4%	19.1%
16	24 March 2013	13.7%	15.3%	15.3%	17.2%
17	30 March 2013	15.1%	17.5%	14.7%	16.0%
18	31 March 2013	13.4%	14.6%	15.6%	17.4%
19	6 April 2013	14.4%	16.6%	16.1%	18.0%
20	7 April 2013	13.4%	15.2%	14.6%	16.3%
21	13 April 2013	11.6%	12.3%	14.2%	16.7%
22	14 April 2013	12.6%	14.0%	15.2%	17.5%
23	20 April 2013	13.4%	14.3%	14.3%	15.4%
24	21 April 2013	14.2%	15.7%	16.8%	18.8%
Average		12.6%	13.8%	13.7%	15.4%

== Awards and nominations ==
Year	Award	Category	Nominee(s)	Result
2013	7th Mnet 20's Choice Awards	20's Booming Star – Male	Do Ji-han	Nominated
2013	21st SBS Drama Awards	Top Excellence Award, Actor in a Drama Special	Kang Ji-hwan	Nominated
2013	21st SBS Drama Awards	Top Excellence Award, Actress in a Drama Special	Hwang Jung-eum	Nominated
2013	21st SBS Drama Awards	Excellence Award, Actor in a Drama Special	Park Sang-min	Nominated
2013	21st SBS Drama Awards	Special Acting Award, Actress in a Drama Special	Oh Yoon-ah	Nominated
2013	21st SBS Drama Awards	Achievement Award	Kim Soo-mi	Won
