= Maeng Se-chang =

South Korean actor and singer (born 1991)

- Born: November 13, 1991 (age 34); South Korea
- Education: Kookmin University
- Occupations: Actor; singer
- Agent: Flight Entertainment

Korean name
- Hangul: 맹세창
- RR: Maeng Sechang
- MR: Maeng Sech'ang

Maeng Se-chang (Korean: 맹세창; born November 13, 1991) is a South Korean actor and singer. Maeng started his career as a child actor. In 2011, he revealed his hidden ambitions as a singer. In July 2011, he debuted as the leader of the ballad group BoM with a single album "Without You." However, BoM was disbanded in March 2013.

== Filmography ==
=== Film ===
Year	Title	Role
2000	Love Bakery	Park Joonho
2003	Scent of Love	Dong-hyun
2003	A Man Who Went to Mars	young Seungjae
2003	Sky Blue	young Sooha (voice)
2005	Diary of June	Jang Joonha
2014	Ode to My Father	Korean miner 4
2016	Su Saek	Yoonseok

=== Television series ===
Year	Title	Role	Network
1999	Hometown Legends: "Oseam"		KBS2
2000	Tough Guy's Love	Bae Kyunggo	KBS2
2000	Taejo Wang Geon	young Gung Ye	KBS1
2000	I Want to Keep Seeing You	Kim Yikang	SBS
2001	The Merchant	young Im Sang-ok	MBC
2002	Present	Kim Yoonshik	MBC
2002	Moon on Cheomseongdae	Hoonsik	KBS2
2002	The Great Ambition	young Park Jaeyoung	MBC
2006	My Beloved Sister	Yoon Youngjoo	MBC
2007	Catching Up with Gangnam Moms	Choi Jinwoo	SBS
2008	Hong Gil-dong	Gom	KBS2
2008	Women in the Sun	young Cha Dongwoo	KBS2
2010	Legend of the Patriots		KBS1
2012	The Strongest K-Pop Survival	Jang Tae-kwon	Channel A
2013	The Greatest Thing in the World	Bo-hyun	MBC
2013	Drama Festival: "Lee Sang That Lee Sang"	young Soo-young	MBC
2016	The Love Is Coming	Jang Han-sol	SBS
2018	Coffee, Do Me a Favor	Lee Dong-goo	Channel A

=== Variety show ===
Year	Title	Notes
2011	Strong Heart	

== Discography ==
Album information	Track listing
Without You: Album; Artist: BoM; Released: July 2011; Label:	Track listing

== Awards and nominations ==
Year	Award	Category	Nominated work	Result
1999	KBS Drama Awards	Best Young Actor	Hometown Legends "오세암(五歲庵)"	Nominated
2002	KBS Drama Awards	Best Young Actor	Moon on Cheomseongdae	Won
2008	KBS Drama Awards	Best Young Actor	Hong Gil-dong	Nominated
