= Terroir (TV series) =

- Genre: Drama
- Written by: Hwang Seong-gu
- Directed by: Kim Young-min
- Starring: Kim Joo-hyuk; Han Hye-jin; Yoo Sun; Ki Tae-young
- Country of origin: South Korea
- Original language: Korean
- No. of episodes: 20

Production
- Production location: South Korea
- Running time: 70 minutes
- Production company: Yedang Entertainment

Original release
- Network: SBS
- Release: December 1, 2008 – February 17, 2009

Terroir (Korean: 떼루아) is a 2008 South Korean television series starring Kim Joo-hyuk, Han Hye-jin, Yoo Sun, and Ki Tae-young. It aired on SBS, premiering on December 1, 2008, on Mondays and Tuesdays at 21:55 (KST).

== Cast ==
=== Main cast ===
- Kim Joo-hyuk as Kang Tae-min
- Han Hye-jin as Lee Woo-joo
- Yoo Sun as Ahn Ji-sun
- Ki Tae-young as Joey Park

=== Supporting cast ===
- Park Byung-ho as Chairman Kang - Kang Tae-min's grandfather
- Jung Ho-bin as Kang Jung-tae - Kang Tae-min's uncle
- Jeon Soo-kyeong as Aunt Ok-rim
- Kim Byung-se as André Lim
- Chae Young-in as Manager Jo Min-ji
- Song Seung-hwan as Representative Yang Seung-geol
- Ryu Hyun-kyung as Gong Yook-gong
- Jang Hyo-jin as Shin Dae-ri
- Song Bong-eun as Sommelier
- Kim Jae-seung as Lee Jae-joo
- Cha Sung-hoon as Manager
- Lee Sung-min
- Lee Tae-sung as Park Dan-byul
