= Children of a Lesser God (TV series) =

2018 South Korean television series

- Promotional poster
- Hangul: 작은 신의 아이들
- RR: Jageun sinui aideul
- MR: Chagŭn sinŭi aidŭl
- Genre: Mystery; Horror; Thriller; Drama
- Created by: Jinnie Choi from Studio Dragon
- Written by: Han Woo-ri
- Directed by: Kang Shin-hyo
- Starring: Kang Ji-hwan; Kim Ok-vin; Sim Hee-seop
- Music by: Ha Geun-young
- Country of origin: South Korea
- Original language: Korean
- No. of episodes: 16

Production
- Executive producers: Kim Young-gyu; Lee Seung-hoon
- Producer: Jang Jin-wook
- Production companies: Studio Dragon; KPJ

Original release
- Network: OCN
- Release: March 3 – April 22, 2018

Children of a Lesser God (Korean: 작은 신의 아이들) is a 2018 South Korean television series starring Kang Ji-hwan and Kim Ok-vin. It aired on OCN from March 3 to April 22, 2018, every Saturday and Sunday at 22:20 (KST).

== Synopsis ==
The story of two detectives who work together to unravel the corruption behind a tragedy that happens within a powerful organization.

== Cast ==
=== Main ===
- Kang Ji-hwan as Cheon Jae-in, an elite and genius detective who is guided by only facts, logic and numbers.
- Kim Ok-vin as Kim Dan, a warm-hearted rookie detective who has a supernatural ability to see death.
  - Han Seo-jin as young Kim Dan

=== Supporting ===
- Shim Hee-sub as Joo Ha-min
- Lee Elijah as Baek A-hyeon
- Lee Jae-yong as Kook Han-joo
- Jang Gwang as Pastor Wang
- Lee Hyo-jung as Baek Do-gyu
- Yeon Je-hyung as Gye Do-hoon
- Ahn Gil-kang as Kim Ho-ki
- Hong Seo-young as Chun Su-in
- Kim Hyung-bum as Choi Sung-ki
- Joo Suk-tae as Park Ji-hoon, Team leader
- Shim So-young as Jamido resident
- Kim Ji-yoo as Da Yun
- Kim Dong-young as serial killer Han Sang-goo

== Production ==
- The first script reading of the cast was held on December 17, 2017 at CJ E&M in Sangam-dong.
- Jo Min-ki originally played Kook Han-joo but he was removed from the series after accusations of sexual harassment and assault. He was replaced by Lee Jae-yong.

== Viewership ==
Children of a Lesser God : South Korea viewers per episode (thousands)

Season	Episode number																Average
Season	1	2	3	4	5	6	7	8	9	10	11	12	13	14	15	16	Average
1	691	759	666	838	663	807	687	902	766	900	868	982	818	929	828	1171	830

Source: Audience measurement performed nationwide by Nielsen Korea.

Average TV viewership ratings
Ep.	Original broadcast date	Average audience share		
Ep.	Original broadcast date	Nielsen Korea		TNmS
Ep.	Original broadcast date	Nationwide	Seoul	Nationwide
1	March 3, 2018	2.540%	2.870%	2.5%
2	March 4, 2018	2.705%	2.702%	2.8%
3	March 10, 2018	2.154%	2.200%	2.2%
4	March 11, 2018	2.861%	2.734%	2.5%
5	March 17, 2018	2.464%	2.208%	2.8%
6	March 18, 2018	3.195%	3.246%	3.2%
7	March 24, 2018	2.548%	2.426%	2.5%
8	March 25, 2018	3.295%	3.412%	3.6%
9	March 31, 2018	2.886%	2.923%	2.9%
10	April 1, 2018	3.502%	3.299%	3.0%
11	April 7, 2018	3.044%	2.807%	3.1%
12	April 8, 2018	3.651%	3.526%	3.8%
13	April 14, 2018	3.155%	3.136%	3.3%
14	April 15, 2018	3.847%	3.426%	3.6%
15	April 21, 2018	3.287%	3.152%	3.4%
16	April 22, 2018	3.926%	3.408%	4.2%
Average		3.065%	2.967%	3.1%
In the table above, the blue numbers represent the lowest ratings and the red numbers represent the highest ratings.; This series aired on a cable channel/pay TV which normally has a relatively smaller audience compared to free-to-air TV/public broadcasters (KBS, SBS, MBC and EBS).
