= Fireworks (2006 TV series) =

South Korean television drama

- Hangul: 불꽃놀이
- Lit.: Fireworks Exhibition
- RR: Bulkkonnori
- MR: Pulkkonnori
- Genre: Melodrama; Romance
- Written by: Kim Soon-deok
- Directed by: Jung Se-ho; Kim Hong-sun
- Starring: Han Chae-young; Kang Ji-hwan; Park Eun-hye; Yoon Sang-hyun
- Country of origin: South Korea
- Original language: Korean
- No. of episodes: 17

Production
- Producer: Lee Chang-sub
- Running time: 60 minutes
- Production company: Chorokbaem Media

Original release
- Network: MBC TV
- Release: May 13 – July 9, 2006

Fireworks (Korean: 불꽃놀이) is a 2006 South Korean television series starring Han Chae-young, Kang Ji-hwan, Park Eun-hye and Yoon Sang-hyun. It aired on MBC from May 13 to July 9, 2006 on Saturdays and Sundays at 21:40 for 17 episodes.

== Plot ==
Headstrong and resourceful, Shin Na-ra once dreamed of becoming a career woman, but she spent the best years of her life supporting Kang Seung-woo, her boyfriend of seven years. Now he is a successful accountant and she is unemployed and rapidly approaching thirty. Na-ra hopes to marry Seung-woo, but after he returns from a business trip, he unexpectedly breaks up with her on their anniversary, telling her that not only did he have an affair, but he fell in love with the other woman, a cosmetics manager named Cha Mi-rae.

To drown her sorrows, Na-ra drinks a large amount of alcohol and unknowingly drops the ring Seung-woo once gave her into a shot glass of soju. A stranger, Na In-jae, drinks the shot without seeing the ring and both of them end up in the hospital.

Later, Na-ra decides to confront the woman who stole her boyfriend, but while at Mi-rae's cosmetics company, a job ad catches her eye. With nothing to lose, Na-ra fakes being her 20-year-old sister Na-kyung, a high school graduate, and starts working as a sales clerk at the company. Just her luck, Na-ra's co-worker is In-jae, who turns out to also be in love with Mi-rae. The two constantly clash at work, with Na-ra finding In-jae immature and spoiled. But what she doesn't know is that In-jae is actually the son of the company's vice president who was forced by his mother to learn the ropes by starting from the bottom.

== Cast ==
- Han Chae-young as Shin Na-ra
- Kang Ji-hwan as Na In-jae
- Park Eun-hye as Cha Mi-rae
- Yoon Sang-hyun as Kang Seung-woo
- Park Jung-soo as Park Jin-hwa
- Kim So-yeon as Shin Na-kyung
- Park Geun-hyung as Shin Ho-sub
- Kim Chang-sook as Choi Soon-young
- Park So-ri as Im Choon-ae
- Kim Joo-hyun as Jo Ah-ra
- Lee Jae-young as Ho-sung
- Lee Tae-ri (Note: Credited as Lee Min-ho.) as Bong-chang
- Chae Eun-joo as customer
