= Choi Seung-hyun =

South Korean composer

Choi Seung Hyun
- Born: South Korea
- Other name: Shawn Choi
- Education: New York University (M.M. in Film Scoring)
- Occupations: composer, music producer, Film score composer
- Years active: 2000-present

Korean name
- Hangul: 최승현
- Hanja: 崔承鉉
- RR: Choe Seunghyeon
- MR: Ch'oe Sŭnghyŏn

Choi Seung Hyun, also known as Shawn Choi, is a South Korean film score composer. He was one of the composers of Oldboy and composed the original score for Lady Vengeance. His filmography also includes The Classic, My Girlfriend Is an Agent, Children..., and other South Korean films.

== Filmography ==
Year	Title	Role	Notes
2002	Ardor	Composer	co-composed with Shim Hyun-jung; music supervised by Jo Yeong-wook
2003	The Classic	Composer	Original score composed by Choi Seung-hyun; music supervised by Jo Yeong-wook
2003	Oldboy	Composer	co-composed with Shim Hyun-jung and Lee Jisoo; music supervised by Jo Yeong-wook
2004	Ice Rain	Composer	co-composed with Lee Hyun-Yang; music supervised by Jo Yeong-wook
2004	Windstruck	Composer	Original score
2005	Sympathy for Lady Vengeance	Composer	Original Score composed by Choi Seung-hyun; music supervised by Jo Yeong-wook
2006	Coma	Composer	OCN television film series (5 episodes)
2006	Fly High	Composer	Romance
2007	Black House	Composer	Thriller
2007	Wide Awake	Composer	Mystery thriller
2008	The Guard Post	Composer	Thriller
2008	Dachimawa Lee	Composer	Action comedy
2008	My Mighty Princess	Composer	Action fantasy
2009	My Girlfriend Is an Agent	Composer	Romantic action-comedy
2009	Sisters on the Road	Composer	Drama
2009	Yoga Hakwon	Composer	Horror film
2010	Joomoonjin	Composer	Fantasy romance
2010	Short! Short! Short!: Fantastic Theater	Composer	Segment "Hunger"
2011	Children...	Composer	Crime drama
2012	Runway Cop	Composer	Action comedy
2014	Meet Miss Anxiety	Composer	Credited as composer in the film’s opening credits.Romantic comedy
2015	The Long Way Home	Composer	War comedy-drama
2016	Bounty Hunters	Composer	Action comedy
2021	Time To Play	Composer	Documentary Film
2021	What Happened to Mr. Cha?	Composer	Netflix film
2021	Whisper in the Wind	Composer	Unreleased film

=== Music department ===
- Waikiki Brothers (2001) – Musician
- Friend (2001) – Musician; Additional Music
- Dig or Die (2002) – Music Department
- Silmido (2003) – Music Department
