= Lie to Me (2011 TV series) =

South Korean television series

- First official poster
- Hangul: 내게 거짓말을 해봐
- RR: Naege geojinmareul haebwa
- MR: Naege kŏjinmarŭl haebwa
- Genre: Romance; Comedy; Drama
- Created by: SBS
- Written by: Kim Ye-ri
- Directed by: Kim Soo-ryung; Kwon Hyuk-chan
- Starring: Kang Ji-hwan; Yoon Eun-hye; Sung Joon; Jo Yoon-hee
- Country of origin: South Korea
- Original language: Korean
- No. of episodes: 16

Production
- Running time: Monday & Tuesday 21:55 (KST)
- Production companies: Verdi Media; Pan Entertainment; Lie to Me SPC

Original release
- Network: SBS
- Release: 9 May – 28 June 2011

Lie to Me (Korean: 내게 거짓말을 해봐) is a South Korean television series starring Kang Ji-hwan, Yoon Eun-hye, Sung Joon and Jo Yoon-hee.

The series revolves around a civil servant named Gong Ah-jung (played by Yoon) who pretends to be the wife of the wealthy hotel heir, Hyun Ki-joon (played by Kang), to impress her former friend. It is directed by Kim Soo-ryung and Kwon Hyuk-chan, produced by Jo Sung-won and written by Kim Ye-ri.

== Synopsis ==
Gong Ah-jung (Yoon Eun-hye) is a government employee of the Ministry of Culture, Sports and Tourism. At the beginning of the series, Ah-jung lies to an antagonistic friend about being married to not lose face in front of her. The lie quickly snowballs (due to several misunderstandings) until Ah-jung realizes that everyone is gossiping about her supposed, secret marriage to Hyun Ki-joon (Kang Ji-hwan), the wealthy president of World Hotel.

Ki-joon confronts Ah-Jung and asks her to rectify the situation as the rumor has spread to even his friends. Ki-joon and Ah-jung decide to take action to squash the rumors, with Ah-jung agreeing to call her friends together so she can confess her indiscretion. When this doesn't go as planned, Ki-joon decides to take legal action against Ah-jung. However, after a series of events that bond the pair, they agree that pretending to be married for a short while would be mutually beneficial. Ki-joon says that in spite of this, Ah-jung's lie is not forgiven, and he threatens to eventually follow through with his lawsuit.

Things become even more complicated when Ki-joon's ex-fiancée returns from France. As Ki-joon and Ah-jung grow closer and fonder of one another over the duration of their pretend marriage, Ki-joon finds himself questioning his commitment to his former fiancée Yoon-joo.

== Cast ==
- Kang Ji-hwan as Hyun Ki-joon – CEO of World Hotel
- Yoon Eun-hye as Gong Ah-jung
- Sung Joon as Hyun Sang-hee – Ki-joon's brother
- Jo Yoon-hee as Oh Yoon-joo – Ki-joon's ex fiancée
- Hong Soo-hyun as Yoo So-ran – Ah-jung's frenemy
- Ryu Seung-soo as Chun Jae-bum – So-ran's husband and Ah-jung's first love
- Kwon Se-in as Park Hoon – Ki-joon's secretary
- Park Ji-yoon as Manager Park Ji-yoon – Ki-joon's friend and manager of the hotel
- Kang Shin-il as Gong Joon-ho – Ah-jung's dad
- Lee Kyung-jin as Shim Ae-kyung – Joon-ho's longtime love
- Kwon Hae-hyo as Hwang Seok-bong – Ae-kyung's admirer and Sang-hee's friend
- Kang Rae-yeon as Rae-yeon
- Song Ji-eun as Ji-eun
- Kim Bo-yeon as Bo-yeo
- Jang Woo-young as Kim Yeon-nim
- Kim Gyu-jin as Gyu-jin
- Ahn Jung-hoon as Manager Ahn
- Park Hyo-jun as Hyo-jun
- Ja Doo as Ja Doo
- Min Joon-hyun as journalist
- Danny Ahn as Ki-joon's friend (cameo)
- Choi Yoon-so as arranged marriage partner (cameo)
- Yoo Ha-na as herself (cameo)

== Ratings ==
Date	Episode	Nationwide	Seoul
2011-05-09	1	8.2% (19th)	10.1% (11th)
2011-05-10	2	8.3% (20th)	10.0% (10th)
2011-05-16	3	7.4%	9.5% (11th)
2011-05-17	4	7.6% (16th)	9.3% (8th)
2011-05-23	5	7.9% (19th)	9.5% (14th)
2011-05-24	6	8.6% (11th)	10.5% (7th)
2011-05-30	7	8.2% (17th)	9.8% (10th)
2011-05-31	8	8.5% (12th)	10.5% (10th)
2011-06-06	9	9.2% (10th)	11.4% (6th)
2011-06-07	10	9.3% (10th)	10.0% (9th)
2011-06-13	11	8.7% (13th)	10.7% (8th)
2011-06-14	12	8.9% (9th)	11.7% (7th)
2011-06-20	13	8.4% (12th)	9.7% (9th)
2011-06-21	14	8.7% (8th)	9.8% (8th)
2011-06-27	15	8.0% (20th)	8.8%
2011-06-28	16	8.0% (16th)	8.4% (17th)
Average		8.4%	—

Source: TNmS Media Korea

== Awards and nominations ==
Year	Award	Category	Recipient	Result
2011	19th SBS Drama Awards	Top Excellence Award, Actress in a Special Planning Drama	Yoon Eun-hye	Nominated
2011	19th SBS Drama Awards	Excellence Award, Actor in a Special Planning Drama	Kang Ji-hwan	Nominated
2011	19th SBS Drama Awards	Special Acting Award, Actress in a Special Planning Drama	Hong Soo-hyun	Nominated
