= Song Seung-hwan =

South Korean actor

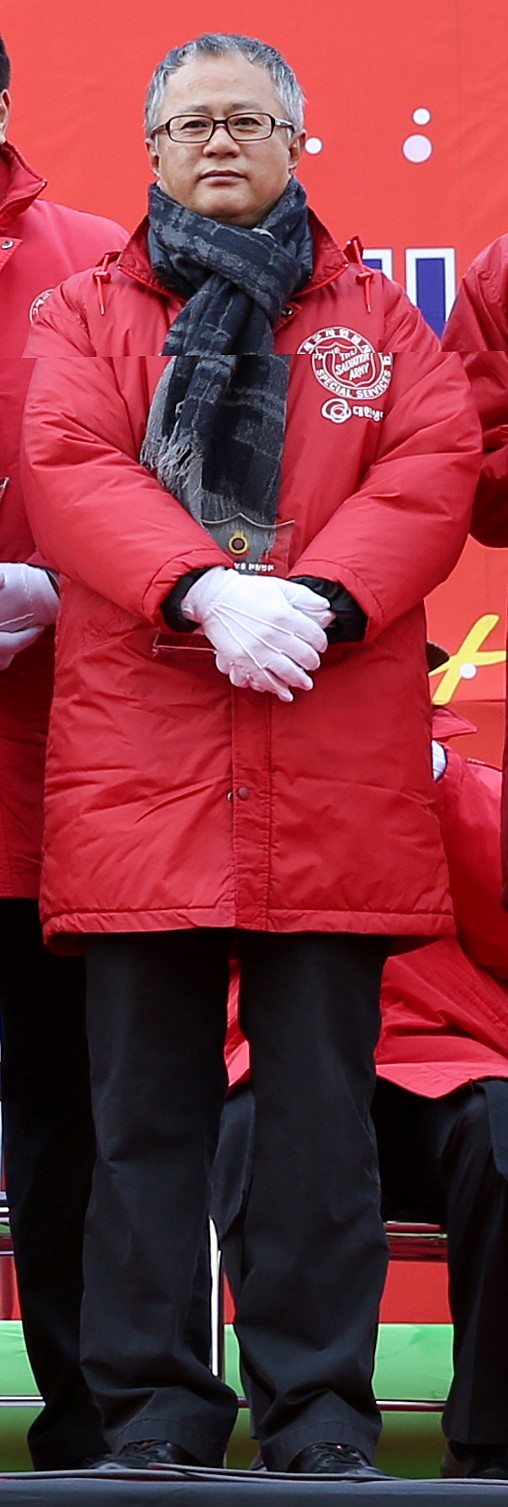
- Song in 2012
- Born: 10 January 1957 (age 69); Seoul, South Korea
- Education: Hankuk University of Foreign Studies
- Occupation: Actor
- Years active: 1965–present
- Agent: PMC Production
- Known for: Racket Boys; One Spring Night; Three Bold Siblings

Korean name
- Hangul: 송승환
- RR: Song Seunghwan
- MR: Song Sŭnghwan

Song Seung-hwan (Korean: 송승환) is a South Korean actor. He is known for his roles in dramas such as My Kids Give Me a Headache, Racket Boys, All About My Mom, One Spring Night and Three Bold Siblings. He also appeared in movies The Memo of a 21-Year-Old, A Peculiar Woman, The Box and The Moon Is... the Sun's Dream.

== Filmography ==
=== Television series ===
Year	Title	Role	Ref.
1979	A Great Korean	Yoo Dong-ha	
1991	Flowers That Never Wilt	Park Seung-hwan	
1995	Men of the Bath House	Yum Byung-ryul	
1997	The Bridal Room	Yang-hwan	
1998	Hug	Min-kyoo	
1999	Kaist	Sung-hu	
2000	Housewife's Rebellion	Park Jae-ha	
2002	Who's My Love	Tak Ki-hwan	
2002	Confession	Yoon Do-sup	
2004	Ireland	President Park	
2005	Be Strong, Geum-soon!	Seung-hwan	
2006	Princess Hours	Emperor	
2006	My Beloved Sister	Ji-na's father	
2008	Terroir	Sommelier	
2011	Listen to My Heart	Choi Jin-chul	
2012	My Kids Give Me a Headache	Ahn Hee-myung	
2015	All About My Mom	Jang Chul-woong	
2016	Yeah, That's How It Is	Yoo Kyung-ho	
2019	One Spring Night	Le Tae-hak	
2021	Racket Boys	Lee Seung-heon	
2022	Three Bold Siblings	Kim Hak-bok	

=== Film ===
Year	Title	Role
1971	A Guilty Woman	Seo-jung
1979	With My Older Brother and, Sister	Hyung-min
1979	The Rose That Swallowed Thorn	Jang-mim's father
1981	A Peculiar Woman	Han Baek Min
1983	The Memo Of A 21-Year-Old	Yeong-bin
1992	The Moon Is... the Sun's Dream	Ha-young
2021	The Box	Audition Judge
2023	That Day I Stand Alone	Nam Goong-hoon

== Ambassadorship ==
- Jeju Special Self-Governing Province Cultural Ambassador in 2009
- Salvation Army Charity Pot Ambassador in 2012

== Accolades ==
=== Awards and nominations ===
Name of the award ceremony, year presented, category, nominee of the award, and the result of the nomination
Award ceremony	Year	Category	Result	Ref.
Dong-A Theater Awards	1968	Best Actor Special Award	Won	
21st Baeksang Arts Awards	1982	Best Actor in a Play	Won	
Seoul Theater Festival Awards	1994	Best Actor Award	Won	
Dong-A Theater Awards	1998	Best Picture	Won	
Korea Musical Grand Prize Special Awards	1998	Best Actor	Won	
Art of the Year Awards	2005	Best Actor	Won	
Government of Russia	2006	Tower Award	Won	
Korea CEO Grand Prix Culture CEO Award	2006	Best CEO Award	Won	
13th Korea Musical Awards	2007	Best Producer Award	Won	
56th Seoul Culture Award in the Theater Field	2007	Best Actor in Theater	Won	
Korea Culture and Arts Awards	2008	Arts Award	Won	
Seoul Tourism Awards	2008	Best Tourism Award	Won	
Alumni Award for Outstanding Foreign Studies	2009	Foreign Studies Award	Won	
Popular Culture and Arts Awards	2012	Order of Archival Culture	Won	
3rd Popular Culture and Arts Award Archiving Culture Medal	2012	Award in Arts	Won	
4th Yegreen Awards	2015	Best Actor Award	Won	
Medal of Sports Merit Medal of Honor	2019	Honor in Sports	Won	
KBS Drama Awards	2022	Best Supporting Actor	Nominated	

=== State honors ===
Name of country, year given, and name of honor
Country or Organization	Year	Honor or Award	Ref.
President of South Korea	2012	Order of Cultural Merit	
