= Sung Yu-ri =

South Korean actress and singer (born 1981)

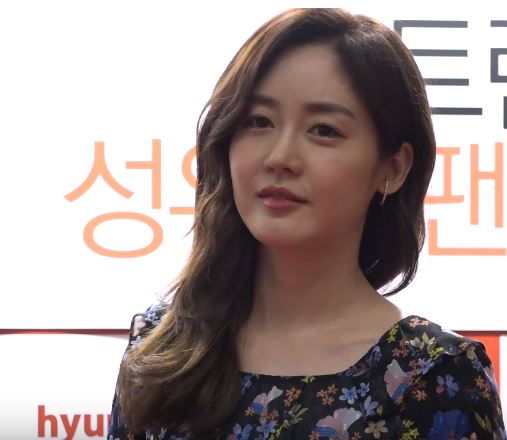
- Sung in 2019
- Born: March 3, 1981 (age 45); Tübingen, West Germany
- Education: Kyung Hee University
- Occupations: Actress; singer
- Years active: 1998–present
- Agent: Initial Entertainment
- Spouse: Ahn Sung-hyun (m. 2017)
- Children: 2
- Musical career
- Genre: Pop
- Instruments: Vocal
- Years active: 1998–2002; 2010–2011; 2019–present
- Label: DSP Media
- Member of: Fin.K.L

Korean name
- Hangul: 성유리
- Hanja: 成宥利
- RR: Seong Yuri
- MR: Sŏng Yuri

Sung Yu-ri (Korean: 성유리; born March 3, 1981) is a South Korean actress and singer. She made her entertainment debut in 1998 as a member of the K-pop group Fin.K.L. Sung turned to acting in 2002, starring in television dramas such as Thousand Years of Love (2003), The Snow Queen (2006), Hong Gil-dong (2008), and Feast of the Gods (2010).

== Early life and education ==
Sung was born in 1981 in Tübingen, Baden-Württemberg, West Germany. Her father Sung Jong-hyun, a prominent professor of theology at the Presbyterian College and Theological Seminary, was studying at the time in West Germany. Sung's family returned to South Korea when she was four years old and she grew up in Gangdong District, Seoul. She attended Myung Elementary and Middle School, and Kwang Nam High School, and graduated from Kyung Hee University with a Post Modern Music major in 2005.

== Career ==
When Sung was a high school student, she began her entertainment career in 1998 as the youngest member of the four-member K-pop girl group Fin.K.L (which stood for "Fine Killing Liberty"), one of the first Korean idol groups. Fin.K.L quickly rose in popularity, releasing four albums (Blue Rain (1998), White (1999), Now (2001), Eternity (2002)), and various singles, live concert albums and compilation albums. But after the release of their fourth album, Sung and fellow band members Ock Joo-hyun, Lee Hyori and Lee Jin began doing solo activities.

Sung made her acting debut in 2002 with Bad Girls, and a year later was cast in her first leading role in Thousand Years of Love (2003). Sung learned horseback riding and martial arts in her role as a Baekje princess who time travels to modern-day South Korea. This was followed by the romantic comedy First Love of a Royal Prince (2004), partly shot in Japan and Bali, in which Sung's fun-loving sandwich shop delivery girl was a departure from her previous feminine characters. During this time, she was harshly criticized for her acting.

Sung graduated from Kyung Hee University in February 2005 with a degree in Theater and Film; she also received an Achievement Award for promoting her alma mater. After a brief return to music via Fin.K.L's digital single Corealism in late 2005, she decided to focus solely on her acting career. In line with this, all the Fin.K.L members left their agency DSP Entertainment, and Sung joined SidusHQ in June 2005.

In 2006, she starred in One Fine Day and The Snow Queen, playing, respectively, an orphan adopted by a wealthy but suffocating family, and a cold-hearted heiress with an incurable disease.

But it was fusion-period dramedy Hong Gil-dong in 2008 that changed how the industry perceived Sung as an actress. The series' screenwriters, the Hong sisters were initially criticized for casting her, but they defended Sung, and her portrayal of a tomboyish, vanity-free outlaw drew a positive reception from audiences.

Sung then played an aspiring show director who joins the Cirque du Soleil in Swallow the Sun, a 2009 big-budget action-romance series with overseas location shoots in Las Vegas and South Africa. That same year, she also appeared in her first big-screen starring role as a Korean-American adoptee who returns to her native country to search for her biological mother in Maybe (titled Rabbit and Lizard in Korean).

In 2011, Sung left SidusHQ and transferred to King Kong Entertainment. She then starred in Romance Town, in the role of a maid who wins ₩14 billion in the lottery and keeps it a secret from her boss and fellow household help.

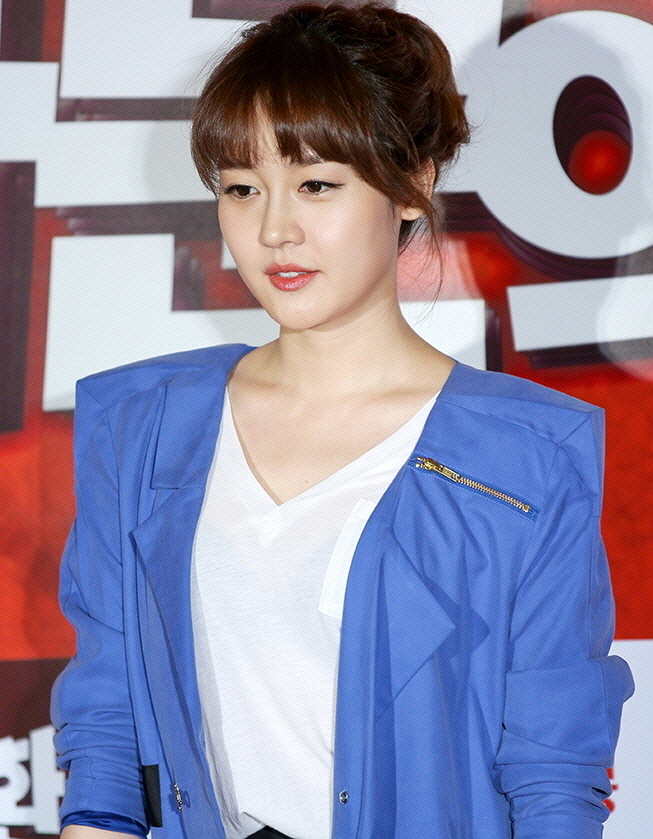
Sung at the Return of the Mafia movie premiere in December 2012

A more traditional melodrama followed with Feast of the Gods (2012), about two rival female chefs of Korean royal court cuisine. Afterwards, Sung reunited onscreen with previous Hong Gil-dong co-star Kang Ji-hwan in the action-comedy film Runway Cop, which revolves around a detective who goes undercover as a fashion model for a drug case.

In 2013, she played a genius with psychogenic amnesia in The Secret of Birth. The low-budget indie A Boy's Sister was then released, in which Sung played the titular character who's grieving after her brother's death. Later that year, she replaced Han Hye-jin as one of the hosts of talk show Healing Camp, Aren't You Happy.

When Sung's contract with King Kong Entertainment expired in January 2014, she signed with Fantagio. She then appeared for free in the short film Chorogi and the Stalker Guy which screened at 6th Seoul International Extreme-Short Image & Film Festival (SESIFF). Sung next played a diva actress who unexpectedly falls for her loyal manager in the 2015 omnibus Summer Snow.

On April 20, 2015, Sung signed an exclusive contract with SL Entertainment. She next starred in the revenge melodrama Monster.

== Personal life ==
Sung married golfer Ahn Sung-hyun in May 2017 in a low-key private ceremony. They had been dating for four years and did not publicly announce their marriage until after the ceremony. On July 16, 2021, Sung announced on her Instagram that she was pregnant with twins. Later on January 8, 2022, Sung's agency announced that Sung had given birth to twin daughters on January 7, 2022.

== Philanthropy ==
On July 22, 2022, Sung purchased cosmetics worth 30 million won with her own money, which were donated to the Skylight Project.

== Video game appearances ==
Sung is a playable character in the video game Tony Hawk's Pro Skater 2 (only in the South Korean PC version).

== Discography ==
=== Solo artist ===
Album information	Track listing
연인선언 (Lover's Declaration): Artist: Tim feat. Sung Yu-ri; Single; Released: August 19, 2010; Label: Sony Music	Track listing: 1. 연인선언 (Lover's Declaration); 2. 연인선언 (Lover's Declaration) (Inst.)
한 사람 (One Person): Artist: Sung Yu-ri; Single; Released: November 20, 2011; Label: CJ E&M	Track listing: 1. Forever; 2. 한 사람 (One Person); 3. 한 사람 (One Person) (Inst.)

== Accolades ==
=== Awards and nominations ===
Year	Award	Category	Nominated work	Result
2002	MBC Entertainment Awards	Best New MC	Section TV Entertainment	Won
2002	SBS Drama Awards	New Star Award	Bad Girls	Won
2003	SBS Drama Awards	Excellence Award, Actress in a Special Planning Drama	Thousand Years of Love	Won
2003	SBS Drama Awards	Netizen Popularity Award	Thousand Years of Love	Won
2003	SBS Drama Awards	Top 10 Stars	Thousand Years of Love	Won
2004	2nd Andre Kim Best Star Awards	Acting Award	—N/a	Won
2004	MBC Drama Awards	Popularity Award, Actress	First Love of a Royal Prince	Nominated
2006	MBC Drama Awards	Excellence Award, Actress	One Fine Day	Nominated
2006	MBC Drama Awards	Special Award, Actress in a Miniseries	One Fine Day	Won
2006	MBC Drama Awards	Popularity Award, Actress	One Fine Day	Nominated
2006	MBC Drama Awards	Best Couple Award with Gong Yoo	One Fine Day	Nominated
2006	KBS Drama Awards	Popularity Award, Actress	The Snow Queen	Won
2006	KBS Drama Awards	Best Couple Award with Hyun Bin	The Snow Queen	Won
2007	3rd Andre Kim Best Star Awards	Female Star Award	—N/a	Won
2007	1st Mnet 20's Choice Awards	Natural Beauty Award	—N/a	Won
2008	44th Baeksang Arts Awards	Most Popular Actress (TV)	Hong Gil-dong	Won
2008	2nd Korea Drama Awards	Excellence Award, Actress	Hong Gil-dong	Nominated
2008	KBS Drama Awards	Excellence Award, Actress in a Miniseries	Hong Gil-dong	Nominated
2008	KBS Drama Awards	Popularity Award, Actress	Hong Gil-dong	Won
2008	KBS Drama Awards	Best Couple Award with Kang Ji-hwan	Hong Gil-dong	Won
2009	SBS Drama Awards	Best Couple Award with Ji Sung	Swallow the Sun	Nominated
2011	KBS Drama Awards	Excellence Award, Actress in a Mid-length Drama	Romance Town	Nominated
2011	KBS Drama Awards	Netizen Award, Actress	Romance Town	Nominated
2011	KBS Drama Awards	Best Couple Award with Jung Gyu-woon	Romance Town	Nominated
2012	MBC Drama Awards	Top Excellence Award, Actress in a Special Project Drama	Feast of the Gods	Won
2012	MBC Drama Awards	Popularity Award, Actress	Feast of the Gods	Nominated
2013	SBS Entertainment Awards	Excellence Award, MC category	Healing Camp, Aren't You Happy	Won
2013	SBS Drama Awards	Excellence Award, Actress in a Miniseries	The Secret of Birth	Won
2014	SBS Entertainment Awards	Producer's Award	Healing Camp, Aren't You Happy	Won
2016	MBC Drama Awards	Top Excellence Award, Actress in a Special Project Drama	Monster	Nominated
2022	2022 KBS Entertainment Awards	Excellence Award in Reality Category	Love Recall	Nominated

=== State honors ===
Name of the organization, year presented, and the award given
Organization	Year	Award	Ref.
51st Taxpayers' Day	2017	Presidential Commendation	
