= My Girlfriend Is an Agent =

My Girlfriend Is An Agent
- Theatrical poster
- Hangul: 7급 공무원
- Hanja: 7級 公務員
- RR: 7geup gongmuwon
- MR: 7kŭp kongmuwŏn
- Directed by: Shin Tae-ra
- Written by: Chun Sung-il
- Produced by: Im Yeong-ho; Chun Sung-il; Shin Hye-yeon; Park Kyung-duk
- Starring: Kim Ha-neul; Kang Ji-hwan
- Cinematography: Choi Ju-yeong
- Edited by: Moon In-dae
- Music by: Choi Seung-hyun
- Production companies: DCG Plus; Harimao Pictures
- Distributed by: Lotte Entertainment
- Release date: April 23, 2009
- Running time: 112 minutes
- Country: South Korea
- Languages: Korean; Russian
- Box office: US$21,056,165

My Girlfriend Is An Agent (Korean: 7급 공무원; lit. "7th Level Civil Servant") is a 2009 South Korean romantic action comedy film directed by Shin Tae-ra and starring Kim Ha-neul and Kang Ji-hwan. The film had 4,078,293 admissions nationwide and was the 4th most -attended film of the year.

== Synopsis ==
A Russian organized crime group takes possession of an advanced bio-chemical weapon from Korea with the help of a corrupt Korean scientist, and two special agents are the world's only hope to stop them. One is a veteran domestic secret agent named Ahn Soo-ji, who is a master martial artist and fencer. The other is a rookie international agent named Lee Jae-joon whose foundation is analytical work, rather than fieldwork. The agents get into trouble when they consistently goof up on the job and have an ill-fated relationship, when coincidentally they are dating and don't know each other's secret identities. The passion between them turns to madness, as the lies and secrets between them build until they nearly kill each other. The only thing they can trust is the fact they love and hate each other. The tension builds as they attempt to work out their relationship while working behind each other's backs, unknowingly on the same mission to save the world.

== Cast ==
- Kim Ha-neul as Ahn Soo-ji
- Kang Ji-hwan as Lee Jae-joon
- Jang Young-nam as Team Leader Hong
- Ryu Seung-ryong as Won-seok
- Kang Shin-il as Dr. No
- Yoo Seung-mok as Police officer Jang
- Jang Nam Yul as Department head Jo
- Elizabeth Sujin Ford as Sonya Victoria

== Awards and nominations ==
2009 Grand Bell Awards

- Best New Actor – Kang Ji-hwan

2009 Blue Dragon Film Awards

- Nomination – Best Actress – Kim Ha-neul
- Nomination – Best Supporting Actress – Jang Young-nam

== Remake ==
It was remade as a television series 7th Grade Civil Servant, starring Choi Kang-hee and Joo Won, which aired on the South Korean network Munhwa Broadcasting Corporation (MBC) in 2013.

In 2011, the remake rights were acquired by UTV Movies. The Bollywood remake will be co-produced by UTV Movies and director-turned-producer Imtiaz Ali, and directed by choreographer Bosco (of Bosco-Caesar fame), with Shahid Kapoor as the male lead and Katrina Kaif as the female lead. The film was canceled.
