= The Secret of Birth =

- Promotional poster
- Also known as: Birth Secret; Secrets about Your Birth
- Genre: Romance
- Written by: Kim Kyu-wan
- Directed by: Kim Jong-hyuk; Ju Dong-min
- Starring: Sung Yu-ri; Yoo Jun-sang
- Composers: Choi Seong-wook; Choi Seong-kwon
- Country of origin: South Korea
- Original language: Korean
- No. of episodes: 18

Production
- Executive producer: Han Jung-hwan
- Producer: Lee Young-joon
- Cinematography: Seo Deuk-won; Bae Hong-soo
- Editor: Kim Hyun-woo
- Production company: iHQ

Original release
- Network: Seoul Broadcasting System
- Release: 27 April – 23 June 2013

The Secret of Birth (Korean: 출생의 비밀; RR: Chulsaengui bimil) is a 2013 South Korean television series that aired on SBS from April 27 to June 23, 2013, on Saturdays and Sundays at 22:00 for 18 episodes. It stars Sung Yu-ri as a genius amnesiac who pieces together her own life in the wake of her memory loss, while Yoo Jun-sang plays her husband who sets out to reclaim what they once had.

== Plot ==
Jung Yi-hyun is a genius, but she suffers from psychogenic amnesia and does not remember her husband and young daughter. Hong Gyung-doo is uneducated and poor, but he's a loving father to young Hae-deum, who's inherited her genius from her mother. Yi-hyun and Gyung-doo met just as both were on the brink of suicide, and they'd decided to choose life together. The drama is about Yi-hyun's journey to putting together the pieces of her lost memory with her husband's help, a man who seems completely unsuited for her. The story explores the relationship from the viewpoint of both parties.

== Cast ==
- Sung Yu-ri - Jung Yi-hyun
  - Kim So-hyun - young Yi-hyun
- Yoo Jun-sang - Hong Gyung-doo
- Kal So-won - Hong Hae-deum
- Lee Jin - Lee Sun-young
  - Lee Hyang-sook - young Sun-young
- Kim Young-kwang - Park Soo-chang
- Kim Kap-soo - Choi Kook
- Lee Hyo-jung - Choi Seok
- Han Sang-jin - Choi Ki-tae
- Jin Hyuk - Choi Ki-joong
- Yoo Hye-ri - Mrs. Jo, Choi Seok's wife
- Jo Mi-ryung - Shim Yeon-jung
- Jung Suk-yong - Tae-man
- Shin Seung-hwan - Jong-tae
- Park Eun-ji - Kwang-sook
- Seo Hyun-chul - Go Eun-pyo
- Kim Hye-jin - Lee Hye-young
- Choi Su-rin - Jung Joo-gyum

== International broadcast ==
- It aired in Japan on cable channel KNTV from April 27 to June 23, 2013 with Japanese subtitles.
- It aired in Vietnam on VTC9 Let's Viet from March 12, 2015.
