= Han Hye-jin (actress) =

South Korean actress (born 1981)

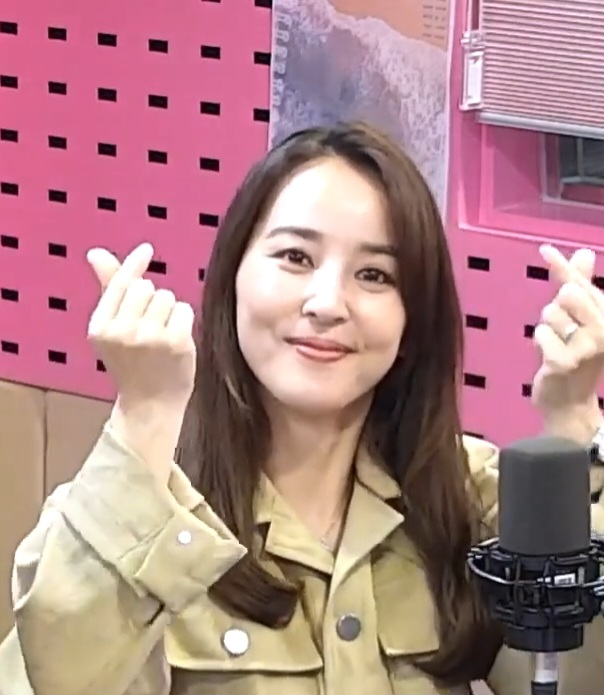
- Han in October 2023
- Born: October 27, 1981 (age 45); Damyang County, South Jeolla Province, South Korea
- Education: Seoul Institute of the Arts (Film)
- Occupation: Actress
- Years active: 2002–present
- Agent: Ace Factory
- Spouse: Ki Sung-yueng (m. 2013)
- Children: 1

Korean name
- Hangul: 한혜진
- RR: Han Hyejin
- MR: Han Hyejin

Han Hye-jin (Korean: 한혜진; born October 27, 1981) is a South Korean actress. Han made her breakthrough in 2005 when she starred as a young widow in her 20s working as an outgoing hairdresser in the hit daily drama Be Strong, Geum-soon!. Among her notable leading roles include Soseono in the historical epic Jumong, Korea's first female doctor of Western medicine in Jejungwon, and a sharpshooter in the manhwa film adaptation 26 Years. She also hosted the popular talk show Healing Camp, Aren't You Happy from 2011 to 2013.

== Personal life ==
Han dated singer Naul (from R&B group Brown Eyed Soul) from 2003 to 2012.

Han confirmed in March 2013 that she was dating South Korean midfielder Ki Sung-yueng, and they announced their engagement two months later. Both are devout Christians. The couple married on July 1, 2013, at the Hotel Intercontinental Seoul. They have a daughter, born on September 13, 2015.

== Filmography ==
=== Film ===
Year	Title	Role	Notes	Ref.
2001	Magic Thumping (두근두근 쿵쿵)	Yoon Mi-ji	short film	
2002	R. U. Ready? (아 유 레디?)	Soo ra	Cameo	
2004	Hi! Dharma 2: Showdown in Seoul	Hong Mi-sun	Cameo	
2010	No Mercy	Min Seo-young		
2012	26 Years	Shim Mi-jin		
2012	Rise of the Guardians		Animation / Korean dubbing	
2014	Man in Love	Joo Ho-jeong		
2014	Late Spring	Female missionary	Cameo	

=== Television series ===
Year	Title	Role	Notes	Ref.
2002	Friends	Park Hye-jin	Korean-Japanese drama	
2002	Romance	Yoon Ji-soo		
2002	I Love You Hyun-jung	Hwang Joo-yeon		
2002	Inspector Park Mun-su	So Hwa-ryeon		
2003	Something About 1%	Yoo Hyun-Jin		
2003	I Love You	Jo hong		
2003	Drama City – "Sweet 18"	Yoon Jeong-suk		
2004	New Human Market	Jang Yeon-hee		
2004	KBS TV Novel – "You Are a Star"	Ha In-kyung		
2004	The Age of Heroes	Cheon Tae-hee		
2005	Be Strong, Geum-soon!	Na Geum-soon		
2006	Jumong	So Seo-no		
2008	Terroir	Lee Woo-joo		
2010	Jejungwon	Yoo Seok-ran		
2011	The Thorn Birds	Seo Jeong-eun		
2012	Syndrome	Lee Hae-jo		
2013	One Warm Word	Na Eun-jin		
2016	The Doctors	Jo Soo-ji	Special appearance	
2018	Hold Me Tight	Nam Hyun-joo		
2020	Mothers	Han Jung-Eun	Special drama	
2023	Divorce Attorney Shin	Lee Seo-jin		
2025	Dont call me mam	Koo ju-young		

=== Television shows ===
Year	Title	Role	Notes	Ref.
2011	KBS Drama Awards	Host	with Joo Won, Jun Hyun-moo	
2011–2013	Healing Camp, Aren't You Happy	Host	July 7, 2011 – August 12, 2013	
2016–2017	My Little Old Boy	Host	July 26, 2016 – February 13, 2017	
2022	Give a gift to the self-reliant youths of tomorrow	Host		
2023	One Meal After Work	Host		

== Theater ==
Theater play performances of Han Hye-jin
Year	Title	Role	Venue	Date	Ref.
2023	Our Little Sister	Sachi	Seoul Arts Center	October 8 to November 19	

== Awards and nominations ==
Year	Award	Category	Nominated work(s)	Result	Ref.
2004	MBC Drama Awards	Best New Actress	Age of Heroes	Nominated	
2004	KBS Drama Awards	Best New Actress	You Are a Star	Won	
2005	The 41st Baeksang Arts Award	Best New Actress in TV Category	Be Strong, Geum-soon!	Won	
2005	Korea Visual Arts Festival	Photogenic Award, Drama Category	Be Strong, Geum-soon!	Won	
2005	MBC Drama Awards	Grand Prize (Daesang)	Be Strong, Geum-soon!	Nominated	
2005	MBC Drama Awards	Top Excellence Award	Be Strong, Geum-soon!	Won	
2005	MBC Drama Awards	Popularity Award Actress	Be Strong, Geum-soon!	Nominated	
2005	MBC Drama Awards	Best Couple Award with Kang Ji-hwan	Be Strong, Geum-soon!	Nominated	
2006	MBC Drama Awards	Grand Prize (Daesang)	Jumong	Nominated	
2006	MBC Drama Awards	Top Excellence Award, Actress	Jumong	Won	
2006	MBC Drama Awards	Popularity Award Actress	Jumong	Nominated	
2006	MBC Drama Awards	Best Couple Award with Song Il-gook	Jumong	Nominated	
2007	The 43rd Baeksang Arts Awards	Best Actress	Jumong	Nominated	
2007	Korea International Jewelry & Watch Fair	Best Jewelry Lady		Won	
2008	SBS Drama Awards	Best Actress in a Special Planning Drama	Terroir	Nominated	
2010	The 31st Blue Dragon Film Awards	Best New Actress Award	No Mercy	Nominated	
2010	SBS Drama Awards	Best Actress in a Special Planning Drama	Jejungwon	Nominated	
2010	SBS Drama Awards	Producers' Award	Jejungwon	Won	
2011	SBS Entertainment Awards	Best New MC, Talk Show category	Healing Camp	Won	
2011	SBS Entertainment Awards	Netizen Popularity Award	Healing Camp	Nominated	
2011	KBS Drama Awards	Top Excellence Award, Actress in a Mini-Series	The Thorn Birds	Nominated	
2011	KBS Drama Awards	Popularity Award	The Thorn Birds	Won	
2011	KBS Drama Awards	Netizen Award, Actress	The Thorn Birds	Nominated	
2011	KBS Drama Awards	Best Couple Award with Joo Sang-wook	The Thorn Birds	Nominated	
2012	SBS 2012 first half program	Special Award of Evaluation and Deliberation	Healing Camp	Won	
2012	Mnet 20's Choice Awards	20's Variety Star	Healing Camp	Won	
2012	Korean Womenlink	Green Media Award	Healing Camp	Won	
2012	SBS Entertainment Awards	Excellence Award in a Talk Show	Healing Camp	Won	
2013	The 49th Baeksang Arts Awards	TV Category Female Variety Show Award	Healing Camp	Nominated	
2014	SBS Drama Awards	Top Excellence Award, Actress in a Drama Special	One Warm Word	Nominated	
2018	MBC Drama Awards	Top Excellence Award, Actress in a Wednesday-Thursday Miniseries	Hold Me Tight	Nominated	
