= First Love of a Royal Prince =

- Promotional poster
- Also known as: A Prince's First Love
- Genre: Romance; Comedy; Drama
- Written by: Kim Eui-chan; Jung Jin-young
- Directed by: Lee Kwan-hee
- Starring: Sung Yu-ri; Cha Tae-hyun; Kim Nam-jin; Jin Jae-young
- Country of origin: South Korea
- Original language: Korean
- No. of episodes: 18

Production
- Producer: Lee Eun-kyu
- Production locations: South Korea; Japan; Bali
- Running time: 60 minutes

Original release
- Network: MBC
- Release: June 23 – August 26, 2004

First Love of a Royal Prince (Korean: 황태자의 첫사랑; RR: Hwangtaejaui cheotsarang; also known as A Prince's First Love) is a 2004 South Korean television series starring Sung Yu-ri, Cha Tae-hyun, Kim Nam-jin and Jin Jae-young. It aired on MBC from June 23 to August 26, 2004 on Wednesdays and Thursdays at 21:55 for 18 episodes.

== Plot ==
Kim Yu-bin (Sung Yu-ri) is a fun-loving, affable sandwich shop delivery girl who has been harboring a crush on the recipient of her first delivery, Cha Seung-hyun (Kim Nam-jin). Seung-hyun, a well pedigreed and recognized manager of Any Electronics, stands in stark contrast to Choi Gun-hee (Cha Tae-hyun), a spoiled heir skipping out on school in the United States unbeknownst to his father.

Yu-bin wins a trip to a ski resort in Japan and decides to visit her friend Shin Ye-seo (Jennie Lee) who works as a guide there, one of several owned by Gun-hee's father. That weekend, Gun-hee sneaks off to the same resort to celebrate his birthday with friends and latest fling, Lee Hae-mi (Jin Jae-young), an actress and rising star. Gun-hee's father's unexpected visit to Japan forces Gun-hee to jump into Yu-bin's cab without his wallet which leads to a full day together for this already contentious pair.

After an unsuccessful stint as secretary for Seung-hyun, Yu-bin finally gets to work her dream job as a tour guide in Bali, only it's alongside her unwanted acquaintance, Gun-hee. When Seung-hyun and Hae-mi travel there to shoot a commercial for a new Any Electronics product launch, strong feelings of attachment and rivalry surface. Meanwhile, a 30-year-old but unforgotten past between Gun-hee's father and Seung-hyun's mother complicates matters.

== Cast ==
- Sung Yu-ri as Kim Yu-bin
- Cha Tae-hyun as Choi Gun-hee
- Kim Nam-jin as Cha Seung-hyun
- Jin Jae-young as Lee Hae-mi, Gun-hee's girlfriend
- Jennie Lee as Shin Ye-seo, Yu-bin's friend
- Lee Deok-hwa as President Choi Eun-chul
- Chang Mi-hee as Cha Mi-hee, Seung-hyun's mother
- Kim Young-joon as Jin-ho, Gun-hee's friend
- Kwon Ki-sun as Yu-bin's mother
- Kim Chang-wan as Yu-bin's father
- Lee Ki-young as Kang Ji-hoon/Kevin
- Yoo Chae-yeong as Han Sarah
- Song Jong-ho as Yoon-joon
- Jeong Jun-ha as Jung Gwang-pil
- Jeon Hye-bin
- Jin Ji-hee
- Seo Il-hyun

== International broadcast ==
- It aired in Vietnam on HTV9 from December 13, 2004.
- It aired in Indonesia on antv from May 6, 2005.
