= Romance Town =

2011 South Korean television series

- Promotional poster
- Hangul: 로맨스 타운
- RR: Romaenseu taun
- MR: Romaensŭ t'aun
- Genre: Romance; Comedy; Drama
- Written by: Seo Sook-hyang
- Directed by: Hwang Eui-kyung; Kim Jin-won
- Starring: Sung Yu-ri; Jung Gyu-woon; Kim Min-jun; Min Hyo-rin
- Country of origin: South Korea
- Original language: Korean
- No. of episodes: 20

Production
- Executive producer: Moon Bo-hyun
- Producers: Im Kyu-yong; Jeon Woo-sung
- Production location: Korea
- Running time: 60 minutes Wednesdays and Thursdays at 21:55 (KST)
- Production companies: CJ E&M; Annex Telecom

Original release
- Network: Korean Broadcasting System
- Release: 11 May – 14 July 2011

Romance Town (Korean: 로맨스 타운) is a 2011 South Korean television series starring Sung Yu-ri, Jung Gyu-woon, Kim Min-jun, and Min Hyo-rin. It aired on KBS2 from May 11 to July 14, 2011 on Wednesdays and Thursdays at 21:55 for 20 episodes.

== Plot ==
Noh Soon-geum is a spunky young woman whose mother and grandmother worked as housemaids, and due to poverty, finds herself continuing the tradition. Her life reaches a turning point when she wins the lottery, with a pot money of ₩14 billion (US$13 million).

Determined to keep her irresponsible father away from her money, Soon-geum stays on at her job and keeps her newfound wealth (stashed away in boxes and boxes of cash) a secret from the residents of her ritzy neighborhood, including her maid friends and her boss's irritable, disagreeable son Kang Gun-woo, with whom she shares a past. But as Soon-geum and Gun-woo later fall in love, her secret eventually gets revealed, and greed and betrayal mount in the neighborhood, from maids and masters alike.

== Cast ==
- Sung Yu-ri as Noh Soon-geum
- Jung Gyu-woon as Kang Gun-woo
- Kim Min-jun as Kim Young-hee
- Min Hyo-rin as Jung Da-kyum
- Park Ji-young as Oh Hyun-joo
- Lee Kyung-shil as Uhm Soo-jung
- Kim Jae-in as Yoon Shi-ah
- Joo Jin-mo as Noh Sang-hoon
- Lee Jae-yong as Kang Tae-won
- Yang Jung-a as Seo Yoon-joo
- Jo Hwi-joon as Kang San
- Ban Hyo-jung as Yoo Choon-jak
- Kim Ye-won as Thu Zar Lin
- Jo Sung-ha as Hwang Yong
- Claudia Kim as Hwang Joo-won
- Lee Jung-gil as Jang Chi-gook
- Shin Shin-ae as Kim Soon-ok
- Kwon Ki-seon as Oh Boon-ja
- Kim Dong-beom as Choi, convenience store clerk
- Heo Tae-hee as Son Jin-pyo
- Im Ye-jin as Soon-geum's mother
- Kim Ji-young as Soon-geum's grandmother
- Go In-beom as Sang-hoon's friend
- Kim Yang-woo as burglar
- Choi Jae-hwan as burglar
