= Be Strong, Geum-soon! =

2005 South Korean television series

- Hangul: 굳세어라 금순아
- RR: Gutseeora Geumsuna
- MR: Kusseŏra Kŭmsuna
- Genre: Drama; Romance; Comedy; Family
- Written by: Lee Jung-sun
- Directed by: Lee Dae-young
- Starring: Han Hye-jin; Kang Ji-hwan
- Opening theme: "One Fine Day" by Marry M
- Ending theme: "Can't This Be Love" by Ki-hoo
- Country of origin: South Korea
- Original language: Korean
- No. of episodes: 163

Production
- Producer: Jang Geun-soo
- Running time: 30 minutes
- Production company: Munhwa Broadcasting Corporation

Original release
- Network: MBC TV
- Release: February 14 – September 30, 2005

Be Strong, Geum-soon! (Korean: 굳세어라 금순아) is a 2005 South Korean television series starring Han Hye-jin and Kang Ji-hwan. It aired on MBC from February 14, 2005 to September 30, 2005 on Mondays to Fridays at 20:20 for 163 episodes.

== Synopsis ==
The drama starts off with Geum-soon in the midst of a hairdressing exam in beautician school, which she fails after suffering a high-tide in her bladder. She marries Song-hwan, who dies in a car accident days later She then moves in with her in-laws and gives birth to son Hwi-seong. She takes on various jobs to earn their keep (although her mother-in-law initially suggests that she should stay at home for another year to look after the baby): she promotes nutritional-drink products in the Korea University Hospital, then went on to be an apprentice in a hair salon.

Geum-soon gets into an accident after her scooter crashes into the car of a fastidious young doctor who reports her to the police and picks up every tiny little fault from a broken finger to a sprained ankle. Later, much to her surprise, when she applies to apprentice at the hair salon, she's shocked to realize that the doctor is the salon owner's son! Eun-ju, the salon's assistant-manager, initially rejects her application because they already have more than enough staff, but later Jae-hee and Mi-ja decide they should employ her.

Geum-soon is placed under the guidance of a colleague, Hae-mee, who bullies her. She changes her hairstyle from a "cabbage-head" (her nickname for Jae-hee) to her a straight and curly one. She loses her job shortly after revealing her past to Miss Yoon after being late one day and her secret is discovered by the assistant-manager.

== Cast ==
- Han Hye-jin as Na Geum-soon
- Kang Ji-hwan as Goo Jae-hee
- Kim Nam-gil as Noh Seong-hwan
- Lee Min-ki as Noh Tae-hwan
- Kim Seo-hyung as Ha Seong-ran
- Youn Yuh-jung as Kim Jin-soon
- Choi Ja-hye as Na Geum-ah
- Yang Hee-kyung as Ahn Soon-ji
- Park In-hwan as Noh So-jang
- Kim Ja-ok as Son Jung-sim
- Kim Yu-seok as Noh Si-hwan
- Jang Yong as Jang Ki-jong
- Yang Mi-kyung as Kim Young-ok
- Lee Se-eun as Jang Eun-ju
- Yoon Mi-ra as Oh Mi-ja
- Lee Hee-do as Na Sang-do
- Chae Eun-seo as Ahn Hae-mee
- Hwang Hye-hee as Yun So-ran
- Song Seung-hwan as Seung-hwan
- Woo Kang-ha as Ah-ki
