= 90 Days, Time to Love =

South Korean television drama series

- Promotional poster
- Also known as: 90 Days of Love; 90 Days of Falling in Love; 90 Days of Romance
- Hangul: 90일, 사랑할 시간
- Hanja: 90日 사랑할 時間
- RR: 90il, saranghal sigan
- MR: 90il, saranghal sigan
- Genre: Melodrama; Romance
- Developed by: Kim Nam-won
- Written by: Park Hae-young
- Directed by: Oh Jong-rok
- Starring: Kang Ji-hwan; Kim Ha-neul; Jung Hye-young; Yoon Hee-seok
- Country of origin: South Korea
- Original language: Korean
- No. of episodes: 16

Production
- Running time: 70 minutes
- Production company: Chorokbaem Media

Original release
- Network: MBC TV
- Release: November 15, 2006 – January 4, 2007

90 Days, Time to Love (Korean: 90일, 사랑할 시간; RR: 90il, saranghal sigan) is a 2006 South Korean television series starring Kang Ji-hwan, Kim Ha-neul, Jung Hye-young and Yoon Hee-seok. It aired on MBC from November 15, 2006, to January 4, 2007, on Wednesdays and Thursdays at 21:55 (KST) for 16 episodes.

== Plot ==
Hyun Ji-seok (Kang Ji-hwan), a university professor, and Go Mi-yeon (Kim Ha-neul), a scriptwriter, were high school sweethearts who discover that they are cousins. They break up, but find themselves attracted to one another once again when they meet in Seoul four years later. They decide to abandon everything and leave for America so that they can get married. However, Ji-seok's father finds out and runs in front of a truck, committing suicide, so that his son doesn't go. Although their visas have just been issued, Ji-seok cannot marry Mi-yeon knowing that their relationship was the cause of his father's death. He abandons Mi-yeon and marries Park Jeong-ran (Jung Hye-young), the daughter of his father's business rival, who is in love with him. They have a daughter, but their marriage is loveless. Mi-yeon goes on to marry another man, Kim Tae-hoon (Yoon Hee-seok).

Nine years later, when Ji-seok learns that he is terminally ill and has only 90 days left to live, he looks for Mi-yeon and asks her to spend the last few days of his life with him.

== Cast ==
=== Main ===
- Kang Ji-hwan as Hyun Ji-seok
- Kim Ha-neul as Go Mi-yeon
- Jung Hye-young as Park Jeong-ran
- Yoon Hee-seok as Kim Tae-hoon

=== Supporting ===
- Kim Hyung-bum as Park Deok-goo, Ji-seok's friend
- Yoon Hyun-sook as Kim Wal-sook, Mi-yeon's friend
- Choi Sung-ho as Boo Byung-chan, Ji-seok's friend
- Ha Jae-young as Mi-yeon's father
- Kim Hye-ok as Ji-seok's mother
- Lee Jae-yong as Ji-seok's father
- Lee Jang-woo as Mi-yeon's classmate

== International broadcast ==
It aired on Japanese cable channel BS Japan in June 2008.

In Thailand, it aired every day from March 18, 2009 to April 21, 2009 on Channel 3.
