= Hong Gil-dong (TV series) =

2008 South Korean television series

- Promotional poster
- Hangul: 쾌도 홍길동
- Hanja: 快刀 洪吉童
- RR: Kwaedo Hong Gildong
- MR: K'waedo Hong Kiltong
- Genre: Historical; Comedy; Romance; Action
- Written by: Hong Jung-eun; Hong Mi-ran
- Directed by: Lee Jung-sub
- Starring: Kang Ji-hwan; Sung Yu-ri; Jang Keun-suk; Kim Ri-na
- Music by: Lee Chang-hee; Choi Myung-hee
- Country of origin: South Korea
- Original language: Korean
- No. of episodes: 24

Production
- Executive producer: Choi Ji-young (KBS Drama Operations Team)
- Producer: Lee Jung-sub
- Production location: Korea
- Camera setup: Multi-camera
- Running time: 60 minutes on Wednesdays and Thursdays at 21:55 (KST)
- Production company: Olive9

Original release
- Network: KBS2
- Release: 2 January – 26 March 2008

Hong Gil-dong (Korean: 쾌도 홍길동) is a 2008 South Korean television series starring Kang Ji-hwan in the title role, Sung Yu-ri, Jang Keun-suk and Kim Ri-na and is written by the Hong sisters. The drama is loosely based on Hong Gil-dong, a fictional book about a Robin Hood-like character during Korea's Joseon Dynasty, but with modern influences and comedic tones. It aired on KBS2 from January 2 to March 26, 2008 on Wednesdays and Thursdays at 21:55 for 24 episodes.

== Synopsis ==
Hong Gil-dong is the illegitimate son of a minister. He is very bright and smart, but was told that he could not accomplish anything in this world due to his illegitimate status. Thus he grows up spending most of his time being lazy and causing trouble for the people around him. However, a local monk thinks he is destined to be much more, and so teaches Gil-dong martial arts. As the series progresses, Gil-dong realizes the severity of the injustices of the ranked world, and starts to fight against these injustices by stealing from the rich and giving to the poor.

Heo Yi-nok is an upbeat, naive and carefree girl. At the beginning of the series, she arrives from China with her grandfather, who has raised her. She meets and befriends Gil-dong. Yi-nok has a past she is unaware of — she does not know her grandfather is not her blood-related grandfather, and that her real parents were murdered. She eventually develops feelings for Gil-dong, who reciprocates her feelings.

Lee Chang-hwi also arrives in Korea from China at the beginning of the series. He seems cold and calculating as he also has a dark past in which his older brother, the current king of Joseon, tried to murder him. Chang-hwi plans a revolution, in which he will overthrow the king and take his place, as he believes he is the rightful king of Joseon. He coincidentally bumps into both Gil-dong and Yi-nok. Both Gil-dong and Yi-nok help Chang-hwi realize what it takes to become a good king. He forges an alliance with Gil-dong, and develops feelings for Yi-nok.

As the question of rightful succession comes into play, Gil-dong and Yi-nok are forced to take sides, all the while having to deal with their own personal problems: their love, Gil-dong with his father issues, and Yi-nok with her murdered parents and their revenge.

== Cast ==
- Kang Ji-hwan as Hong Gil-dong
  - Lee In-sung as young Gil-dong
- Sung Yu-ri as Heo Yi-nok
- Jang Keun-suk as Lee Chang-hwi
  - Choi Soo-han as young Chang-hwi
- Kim Ri-na as Seo Eun-hye
- Kim Jae-seung as Hong In-hyeong, Gil-dong's half-brother
- Cha Hyun-jung as Jung Mal-nyeo
- Park Sang-wook as Shim Soo-geun
- Choi Ran as Court lady Noh
- Kil Yong-woo as Minister Hong Pan-seo, Gil-dong's father
- Ahn Suk-hwan as Minister Seo Yoon-sub, Eun-hye's father
- Jung Eun-pyo as the monk Hye-myung, Gil-dong's master
- Jung Gyu-soo as the elder Heo
- Moon Se-yoon as Mr. Yeon
- In Sung as Chi-soo, Chang-hwi's personal guard
- Lee Deok-hee as Mrs. Kim
- Jo Hee-bong as King Gwanghae
- Maeng Ho-rim as Choi Seung-ji
- Kim Jong-seok as Eunuch Go
- Park Yong-jin as Eunuch Jang
- Choi Seung-kyung as Mr. Wang
- Byun Shin-ho as Hal Meom
- Maeng Se-chang as Gom
- Jang Ah-young as Shim Chung
- Choi Soo-ji as Queen Inmok, Chang-hwi's mother
- Heo In-young as Poong-san's wife

== Ratings ==
Date	Episode	Nationwide	Seoul
2008-01-02	1	16.2% (6th)	15.9% (6th)
2008-01-03	2	15.3% (7th)	15.0% (7th)
2008-01-09	3	14.9% (6th)	14.8% (7th)
2008-01-10	4	16.2% (7th)	15.7% (7th)
2008-01-16	5	14.5% (8th)	14.2% (8th)
2008-01-17	6	15.8% (8th)	16.1% (9th)
2008-01-23	7	13.9% (9th)	13.1% (10th)
2008-01-24	8	17.0% (8th)	16.8% (8th)
2008-01-30	9	15.7% (7th)	15.3% (8th)
2008-01-31	10	15.6% (8th)	15.1% (8th)
2008-02-06	11	14.8% (6th)	14.3% (6th)
2008-02-07	12	8.5% (15th)	8.5% (15th)
2008-02-13	13	14.0% (9th)	14.2% (9th)
2008-02-14	14	14.8% (9th)	14.9% (9th)
2008-02-20	15	13.4% (10th)	13.2% (11th)
2008-02-21	16	13.2% (9th)	13.3% (9th)
2008-02-27	17	13.6% (8th)	13.1% (8th)
2008-02-28	18	14.3% (9th)	14.0% (10th)
2008-03-05	19	15.4% (6th)	15.3% (6th)
2008-03-06	20	16.0% (7th)	16.0% (8th)
2008-03-12	21	14.5% (6th)	14.6% (6th)
2008-03-19	22	14.5% (6th)	14.4% (6th)
2008-03-20	23	14.2% (8th)	14.4% (7th)
2008-03-26	24	13.8% (8th)	14.5% (8th)
Average		14.6%	14.4%

Source: TNS Media Korea

== Awards and nominations ==
Year	Award	Category	Recipient	Result
2008	10th Mnet Asian Music Awards	Best OST	"If" - Kim Taeyeon	Nominated
2008	44th Baeksang Arts Awards	Most Popular Actor (TV)	Kang Ji-hwan	Won
2008	44th Baeksang Arts Awards	Most Popular Actress (TV)	Sung Yu-ri	Won
2008	2nd Roma Fiction Fest	Best Television Product, Miniseries category	Hong Gil-dong	Won
2008	2nd Korea Drama Awards	Excellence Award, Actress	Sung Yu-ri	Nominated
2008	KBS Drama Awards	Top Excellence Award, Actor	Kang Ji-hwan	Nominated
2008	KBS Drama Awards	Excellence Award, Actor in a Miniseries	Jang Keun-suk	Nominated
2008	KBS Drama Awards	Excellence Award, Actress in a Miniseries	Sung Yu-ri	Nominated
2008	KBS Drama Awards	Best Supporting Actor	Jo Hee-bong	Nominated
2008	KBS Drama Awards	Best Young Actor	Maeng Se-chang	Nominated
2008	KBS Drama Awards	Netizen Award, Actor	Kang Ji-hwan	Won
2008	KBS Drama Awards	Popularity Award, Actor	Jang Keun-suk	Won
2008	KBS Drama Awards	Popularity Award, Actress	Sung Yu-ri	Won
2008	KBS Drama Awards	Best Couple Award	Kang Ji-hwan and Sung Yu-ri	Won
2008	KBS Drama Awards	Best Couple Award	Jang Keun-suk and Sung Yu-ri	Nominated

== International broadcast ==
In Thailand, the drama aired dubbed into Thai under the title ฮง กิลดอง จอมโจร โดนใจ (Hong Gil-dong Jomjone Donejai; literally Hong Gil-dong The Thief) on the Channel 7 from April 4, 2009 to June 13, 2009 on Saturdays and Sundays at 09:15.

== See also ==
- Hong Gildong (character)
