= 2016 KBS Entertainment Awards =

15th edition of award ceremony

- Awarded for: Excellence in variety entertainment
- Date: December 24, 2016
- Hosted by: Main: Lee Hwi-jae; Yoo Hee-yeol; Hyeri (Girl's Day) Red Carpet: Jeon So-mi (I.O.I); Choi Yoo-jung (I.O.I)

Television coverage
- Network: KBS, KBS World
- Duration: Approx. 200 minutes
- Ratings: 10.1% (Part 1); 12.8% (Part 2)

The 2016 KBS Entertainment Awards took place on December 24, 2016. The main ceremony was hosted by Lee Hwi-jae, Yoo Hee-yeol and Hyeri (Girl's Day), and the red carpet was hosted by Jeon So-mi and Choi Yoo-jung of I.O.I. The ceremony was televised live on KBS.

== Winners and nominees ==
(Winners denoted in bold)

Grand Prize (Daesang)		Viewers' Choice
**Kim Jong-min** - **2 Days & 1 Night**; Kim Jun-ho - 2 Days & 1 Night, Gag Concert; Lee Hwi-jae - The Return of Superman; Shin Dong-yup - Hello Counselor; Yoo Jae-suk - Happy Together season 3		**2 Days & 1 Night**; Gag Concert; Happy Together season 3; Hello Counselor; Immortal Songs 2; The Return of Superman
Top Excellence
Variety	Talk Show	Comedy
**Lee Dong-gook** - **The Return of Superman**; **Ra Mi-ran** - **Sister's Slam Dunk**; Defconn - 2 Days & 1 Night; Kim Seung-woo - Mr. House Husband	**Jung Jae-hyung** - **Immortal Songs 2**; **Kim Sook** - **Sister's Slam Dunk**, **Battle Trip**; Lee Young-ja - Hello Counselor; Park Myung-soo - Happy Together season 3; Yoo Hee-yeol - You Hee-yeol's Sketchbook	**Lee Su-ji** - **The Most Sensitive People**; **Yoo Min-sang** - **The Most Sensitive People, Large Love**; Kim Min-kyung - Large Love; Lee Sang-hun - Movie Little Television; Park Ji-sun - Like a Family; Song Jun-geun - I Knew This Would Happen, The Most Sensitive People
Excellence
Variety	Talk Show	Comedy
**Ki Tae-young** - **The Return of Superman**; **Lee Beom-soo** - **The Return of Superman**; Bong Tae-gyu – Mr. House Husband; Hong Jin-kyung - Sister's Slam Dunk	**Jun Hyun-moo** - **Happy Together season 3**, **Trick & True**; Jo Se-ho - Happy Together season 3; Kim Jun-hyun - Trick & True; Lee Sang-min - Singing Battle – Victory; Moon Hee-jun - Immortal Songs 2	**Lee Hyun-jung** - **Please Go Away**, **Horror Special**, **Look Again**, **The Escape**, **Like A Family**; **Song Young-gil** - **Poor Young-gil**, **Movie Little** **Television**, **Detective Song**, **Bad Guys**; Heo Min - She Was Pretty, Zoom In Zoom Out; Kim Dae-sung - Please Go Away, Minsang Debate 2, Young President, Real Soap Opera; Lee Se-jin - 1 vs 1, Jang Star Entertainment, Surprise Appearances; Park So-ra - Genome Project, Can't Take It Back, Despicable Train; Park So-young - Like A Family, Manga Teacher, Surprise Appearances; Seo Tae-hun - 1 vs 1, Manly Men, Poor Young-gil, Horror Special, Young President
Rookie Award
Variety	Talk Show	Comedy
**Min Hyo-rin** - **Sister's Slam Dunk**; **Yoon Si-yoon** - **2 Days & 1 Night**; Jessi - Sister's Slam Dunk; Kim Se-jeong - Talents for Sale	**Choi Tae-joon** - **Hello Counselor**; **Uhm Hyun-kyung** - **Happy Together season 3**; San E - Battle Trip; Solbin - Music Bank	**Hong Hyun-ho** - **The Escape**, **Please Go Away**, **Horror Special**; **Kim Seung-hye** - **The Most Sensitive People**, **Horror Special**, **Can't Take it Back**; Im Jong-hyuk - Manga Teacher, Descendants of Pyongyang, The Demon; Jang Ha-na - Surprise Appearances, Despicable Train, Genome Project; Kim Min-hee - Genome Project, Just a Movie; Kim Ni-na - Look Again, Manga Teacher; Lee Chang-ho - Young President, Confusing News, Descendants of Pyongyang, Through the Ranks; Shim Mungyu - The Demon
Other Awards
Best Screenwriter Award	Best Entertainer Award	Popularity Award
**Ji Hyun-sook** - **Sister's Slam Dunk**; **Jung Sun-young** - **2 Days & 1 Night**; **Yoon Ki-young** - **Gag Concert**	**Namkoong Min** - **Singing Battle – Victory**	**Children** of **The Return of Superman**
Radio DJ Award	Producer's Choice	Best Teamwork Award
**Park Myung-soo**	**Park Jin-young** - **Sister's Slam Dunk**	**Happy Together season 3**
Best Couple Award	Best Idea Award	Hot Issue Variety Program Award
**Lee Kwang-soo** & **Jung So-min** - **The Sound of Your Heart**	**Gag Concert** – **The Most Sensitive People**	**The Sound of Your Heart**

== Presenters ==
Presenter(s)	Award
Park Bo-gum, Irene (Red Velvet)	Excellence Award (Comedy)
Kim Jong-kook, Cha Tae-hyun	Top Excellence Award (Talk show)

== Performers ==
Artist	Song(s)
Unnies	Shut Up
Twice	Cheer Up, TT
AOA	Heart Attack, Good Luck
I.O.I	Pick Me
