= Kim Jun-hyun =

South Korean comedian (born 1980)

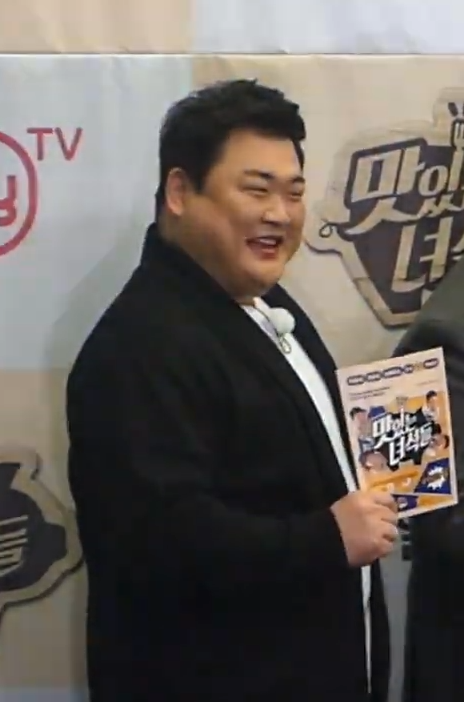
- Kim in 2020
- Born: November 16, 1980 (age 45); Chuncheon, South Korea
- Spouse: Oh Jeong-ju (m. 2013)
- Children: 2 daughters
- Parent: Kim Sang-geun (father)

Comedy career
- Years active: 2007–present
- Medium: Stand-up, television
- Genres: Observational, Sketch, Wit, Parody, Slapstick, Dramatic, Sitcom

Korean name
- Hangul: 김준현
- RR: Gim Junhyeon
- MR: Kim Chunhyŏn

Kim Jun-hyun (Korean: 김준현; born 16 November 1980) is a South Korean comedian. He joined KBS as a comedian for the 22nd open recruitment in 2007 and appeared in KBS's Laughter Club 2, Gag Concert, The Star Who Will Be Big, and Roller Coaster 2. He is currently hosting Immortal Songs: Singing the Legend, and he won the grand prize at the 2023 KBS Entertainment Awards.

He signed an exclusive contract with SM C&C in 2024.

== Early life and education ==
Kim Jun-hyun was born in Chuncheon on 16 November 1980 and raised in Gwangmyeong, Gyeonggi Province. He graduated from Gwangmyeong High School in 2001 and later attended Hankuk University of Foreign Studies (Yongin Campus), where he studied philosophy.

During his military service, Kim aspired to become an announcer or producer, influenced by his father, a former announcer and director at KBS. Following his discharge, he initially prepared for media employment examinations. However, after successfully hosting a dormitory song festival at his university, he redirected his career focus toward comedy.

== Career ==
Following his graduation in 2005, Kim began his career as an aspiring actor at the Daehakro Small Theater. He unsuccessfully auditioned for the Daehakro Theater Company's comedian recruitment in both 2005 and 2006.

Later in 2006, Kim and Kim Young-jo participated in auditions for the KBS2 program Gag Hunt in Yeouido, Seoul. They performed a military-themed skit personifying various food delivery items; however, the performance failed to impress the judging panel, and they were not initially selected for the program.

Despite his initial audition failures, Kim was eventually cast in a segment for rookie performers on a program featuring established comedians. He initially struggled with the lack of formal training and the demands of scriptwriting. During this period, he considered leaving the industry due to professional setbacks and discouraging feedback. However, an accident involving another aspiring comedian made him reconsider, and he decided to approach the production team of the program. After a reconsidering his career path following an incident involving a fellow performer, Kim sought guidance from the program's production team, which included producer Seo Soo-min and writer Choi Dae-woong. With their support, he continued his career and made his official television debut in 2006 on the KBS program Laughter Club 2. He appeared in the segment "Mr. Aristocrat," a role characterized by his signature "Cheers" catchphrase.

Kim was officially selected through the 22nd KBS public recruitment for comedians in 2007. It was a year noted for a significant increase in applicant competition, where passed applicants debuted through the KBS2 flagship comedy program Gag Concert after completing their a month of training. During his early years as a trainee, Kim was part of a cohort of six performers who reportedly earned an initial annual salary of 1.5 million won. Although he initially held minor roles, Kim gained widespread popularity through the segment "Emergency Response Committee." His performance in the segment, characterized by the catchphrase "Whale~?" (Korean: 뭐~?), established him as a prominent figure in the show's lineup.

In 2008, Kim joined the rock band Overaction as a guitarist. Formed by Yoon Hyeong-bin through the Mnet program Moon Hee-jun's Music Rebellion, the group's initial lineup included Kim, Yoon as main vocalist, Kim Young-min on bass, Oh Kyung-soo on drums, and Jacob on keyboards. The band debuted with the single "Run! Run! Run!" and later released the Queen Biho Project Album, which included the autobiographical track "Let's Earn Like a Dog."

Overaction performed at the Incheon Pentaport Rock Festival on 23 July 2010. By this time, the lineup had evolved to include guitarist Lee Kyo-won of the band Burette. Their setlist included original tracks such as "Android" and a cover of Michael Jackson's "Billie Jean." On 23 September 2011, the band appeared on the KBS2 music program Music Bank, performing the single "Taewon." The televised performance featured the core lineup of Yoon, Kim, and Kim Young-min, supported by Lee Kyo-won and session drummer Oh Kyung-su.

In January 2012, Kim joined the Gag Concert segment "Four Things" (Nagasaji), which featured comedians satirizing various social stereotypes. Kim's role focused on self-deprecating humor regarding his physical stature, a persona that remained a consistent element of the segment throughout its run. His performance popularized several catchphrases, including a comedic rationalization for his appetite: "Of course, I thought about it for a moment, but..." Through these performances, Kim established himself as a leading comedian in South Korea, known for signature gestures and catchphrases that achieved broad cultural recognition.

In 2015, he became a founding cast member of the food-themed variety show Delicious Guys. The program significantly contributed to his public image as a "foodie" entertainer. After six years with the show, he departed the production in 2021.

== Personal life ==
Kim is a Roman Catholic. He has cited his father, Kim Sang-geu, a former KBS announcer and director, as a major influence on his life and career.

In September 2011, Kim publicly announced that he was in a relationship. On 20 April 2013, he married Oh Jung-joo, his girlfriend of six years, in a ceremony in Seoul attended by many of his colleagues in the comedy industry. They had their first daughter, Kim Tae-eun, in December 2016. Their second daughter was born on July 6, 2018.

== Filmography ==
=== Television show ===
On-Air

Year	Title	Roles	Notes	Ref.
2006–2008	Laughter Club 2 (폭소클럽 2)	Cast member		
2007–2014; 2020	Gag Concert (개그콘서트)	Cast member		
2011	Big Star (크게 될 스타)	Cast member		
2012	Sponge (스펀지)	Cast member		
2012	Roller Coaster Season 2 (롤러코스터 2)	Cast member		
2012–2014	Crisis Escape No. 1 (위기탈출 넘버원)	Cast member		
2013–2015	The Human Condition	Cast member	Pilot, episode 1–92	
2014	The King of Food	Co-host		
2015	Animals	Host		
2015	What's Wrong with My Age?	Host		
2015	Machohouse	Host		
2015	Always Cantare Season 2	Host		
2015	Same Bed, Different Dreams	Fixed panelist	(Episode 28–44, except episodes 42–43)	
2015–2021	Delicious Guys	Co-host	with Yoo Min-sang, Kim Min-kyung and Moon Se-yoon	
2015–present	Saturday Night Live Korea	Cast member		
2015–2017	Baek Jong-won's Three Great Emperors	Host	(Episodes 1–93)	
2016–2017	Trick & True	Co-host	with Jun Hyun-moo and Lee Eun-gyeol	
2016–2019	Life Bar	Host		
2017	Fantastic Duo season 2	Co-host/panel team leader	with Jun Hyun-moo and Kim Bum-soo	
2017–2021, 2022–present	Welcome, First Time in Korea?	Host		
2019–2020	Battle Trip	Host		
2020–present	Immortal Songs: Singing the Legend	Host		
2021	Son Hyun-joo's Simple Station	MC	with Lim Ji-yeon and Son Hyun-joo~~	
2021	Why Is Classical (Season2)	Host		
2021	The Great Home Cooking Research Institute	Main Host		
2021	Chicken Wars	Host		
2022	One Tree Table	Cast Member		
2022	Heart Beats 38.5	Host		
2022	Day to Eat Out	Host	with Lee Myung-hoon	
2022	Let's Eat GO	Cast Member		
2023	City Sashimi Restaurant	Muk Pro		
2023	Going to Court	Host		
2023, 2024	Mukbo Bro	Cast Member	with Moon Se-yoon	

=== Television series ===
Year	Title	Role
2012	My Husband Got a Family	Variety show PD (cameo, episode 12)
2013	The Queen of Office	Construction worker (cameo, episode 1)
2015	All About My Mom	President Kim (cameo)
2016	Ugly Miss Young-ae 15	Martial arts dojo director (cameo, episode 12)
2018	The Beauty Inside	Cameo, episode 1
2019	Hotel del Luna	Cameo, episode 6

=== Films ===
Year	Title	Role
2010	Nutcracker 3D	Rat King (Korean dub)
2012	A Letter to Momo	Iwa (Korean dub)
2012	Yak: The Giant King	Tossakan/Big Green (Korean dub)
2012	Marrying the Mafia V	Cameo

== Accolades ==
=== Awards and nominations ===
Award	Year	Category	Nominated work(s)	Result	Ref.
48th Baeksang Arts Awards	2012	Best Variety Performer - Male	Gag Concert	Won	
11th KBS Entertainment Awards	2012	Top Excellence Award in Comedy (Male)	Gag Concert: Discoveries in Life, Four Men	Won	
12th KBS Entertainment Awards	2013	Top Excellence Award in Comedy (Male)	Gag Concert: Just Relax, Goosebumps	Won	
15th KBS Entertainment Awards	2016	Excellence Award in Talk Show	Trick & True	Nominated	
17th KBS Entertainment Awards	2019	Top Excellence Award in Entertainment	Battle Trip	Nominated	
2022 KBS Entertainment Awards	2022	Top Excellence Award in Show and Variety Category	Immortal Songs: Singing the Legend	Nominated	
39th Korea Broadcasting Awards	2012	Comedian Award	Gag Concert: Emergency Meeting	Won	
Korea Cable TV Awards	2016	Delicious Star	Delicious Guys	Won	
20th Korean Culture Entertainment Awards	2012	Comedian Award	Gag Concert: Discoveries in Life	Won	
20th Korean Entertainment Arts Awards	2014	Comedian Award		Won	
SBS Entertainment Awards	2015	Excellence Award in Talk Show	Baek Jong-won's Food Truck	Won	
SBS Entertainment Awards	2016	Top Excellence Award in Talk Show	Baek Jong-won's Food Truck	Nominated	
SBS Entertainment Awards	2016	PD Award	Baek Jong-won's Food Truck	Won	
SBS Entertainment Awards	2016	Best Couple Award (paired with Baek Jong-won)	Baek Jong-won's Food Truck	Nominated	
SBS Entertainment Awards	2017	Excellence Award in Talk Show	Fantastic Duo 2	Won	

=== State honors ===
Name of country, award ceremony, year given, and name of honor
Country	Award Ceremony	Year	Honor	Ref.
South Korea	5th Korean Popular Culture and Arts Awards (Note: Honors are given at the Korean Popular Culture and Arts Awards, arranged by the Korea Creative Content Agency and hosted by the Ministry of Culture, Sports and Tourism. They are awarded to those who have contributed to the arts and South Korea's pop culture.)	2014	Ministry of Culture, Sports and Tourism's Commendation	

=== Listicles ===
Name of publisher, year listed, name of listicle, and placement
Publisher	Year	Listicle	Placement	Ref.
Forbes	2013	Korea Power Celebrity	33rd	
Forbes	2014	Korea Power Celebrity	38th	
