= Park Jung-soo (actress) =

South Korean actress (born 1953)

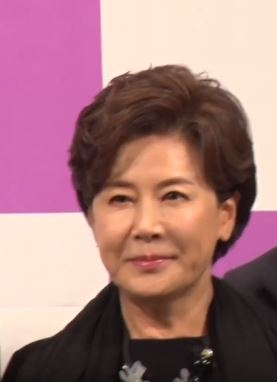
- Park in 2019
- Born: June 1, 1952 (age 74); South Korea
- Education: Duksung Women's University - Business Administration
- Occupation: Actress
- Years active: 1972–present
- Agent: Jellyfish Entertainment

Korean name
- Hangul: 박정수
- RR: Bak Jeongsu
- MR: Pak Chŏngsu

Park Jung-soo (Korean: 박정수; born June 1, 1952), also known as Park Jung-su, is a South Korean actress. Park made her acting debut in 1972 and became best known for starring in television dramas, notably Love and Farewell (1993), Way of Living: Woman (1994), LA Arirang (1995), Why Can't We Stop Them (2000), Rose Fence (2003), and Living in Style (2011).

In 2005, she published her autobiography Park Jung-soo's Inner Beauty, which was also a style guide for women in their fifties.

== Filmography ==
=== Film ===
| Year | Title | Role | Notes/Ref. |
|---|---|---|---|
| 1990 | North Korean Partisan in South Korea | Comrade Myeong-ja | |
| 1991 | Korean Boy | | |
| 1992 | The Son and the Lover | | |
| 1993 | When Adam Opens His Eyes | | |
| 1997 | Change | Eun-bi's mother | |
| 1998 | Seventeen | Ye-jin's mother | |
| 1999 | Until We Meet | Mrs. Choi | |
| 2002 | Sex of Magic | Han Ji-hye's mother | |
| 2005 | The Twins | Mom | |
| 2007 | The Railroad | Han-na's mother | Cameo |
| 2008 | Hana Kage (Flower Shadow) | | Japanese film |
| 2009 | Take Off | Rich wife | Cameo |
| 2023 | Coboweb | Mrs. Oh | |

=== Television series ===
| Year | Title | Role | Network |
|---|---|---|---|
| 1985 | Sun Rising Over the Hill | | KBS2 |
| 1989 | Pain | | MBC |
| 1991 | What is Love | Jung-sook | MBC |
| 1991 | Autumn Flowers in Winter Trees | | KBS2 |
| 1992 | Living | Mrs. Ha | SBS |
| 1992 | Our Paradise 2 | | MBC |
| 1993 | Stormy Season | Jin-hee's mother | MBC |
| 1993 | Pilot | Yoon Mi-ja | MBC |
| 1993 | Love and Farewell | Sun-joo | KBS2 |
| 1993 | Ladies' Man | | MBC |
| 1994 | Challenge | Kwang-sik's wife | MBC |
| 1994 | Way of Living: Woman | Ahn Woo-jung | SBS |
| 1995 | Hopefully the Sky | Mi-ra, second daughter-in-law | KBS1 |
| 1995 | Do You Remember Love? | Yoon-sook | MBC |
| 1995 | LA Arirang | | SBS |
| 1995 | Jazz | Lee Ha-neul's mother | SBS |
| 1996 | Morning in Paris Park | Cha Kyung-ok | KBS2 |
| 1996 | August Bride | | SBS |
| 1996 | First Love | Park Shin-ja's mother | KBS2 |
| 1996 | Splendid Holiday | | MBC |
| 1997 | Light in the Field | | KBS1 |
| 1997 | You and I | Si-yeon's mother | MBC |
| 1998 | Tango in Seoul | Kim Ae-shil | SBS |
| 1998 | For Love | Choi Soon-geum | MBC |
| 1998 | My Love by My Side | | KBS1 |
| 1999 | Happy Together | Jin Soo-ha's mother | SBS |
| 1999 | The Last War | Han Ji-soo's mother | MBC |
| 1999 | Did You Ever Love? | Jung In-ok | KBS2 |
| 1999 | Hur Jun | Mrs. Oh, Yoo Ui-tae's wife | MBC |
| 2000 | More Than Words Can Say | Oh Gap-jin | KBS1 |
| 2000 | Juliet's Man | Chae-rin's mother | SBS |
| 2000 | Snowflakes | Min Hyo-sun | KBS2 |
| 2000 | Aspen Tree | | SBS |
| 2000 | Why Can't We Stop Them | Park Jung-soo | SBS |
| 2001 | Sweet Bear | Kyung-ae | MBC |
| 2001 | Like Father, Unlike Son | Park So-yi | KBS2 |
| 2002 | Who's My Love | Park Kyung-hwa | KBS2 |
| 2002 | Golden Wagon | Jung Soo-mi | MBC |
| 2003 | Drama City: "The Queen of Disco" | Geum-bong's mother | KBS2 |
| 2003 | Rose Fence | Kang Yoon-hee | KBS2 |
| 2003 | Bodyguard | Hong Kyung-tak's mother | KBS2 |
| 2003 | First Love | Yoon Seo-kyung's mother | SBS |
| 2003 | Jewel in the Palace | Park Yong-shin | MBC |
| 2004 | Match Made in Heaven | Hwang Jong-hee's mother | MBC |
| 2004 | Crush | | SBS |
| 2004 | Beautiful Temptation | Jang Geum-shil | KBS2 |
| 2004 | Han River Ballad | Park Dan-ok | MBC |
| 2004 | The Autumn of Major General Hong | Kang Hye-joo | SBS |
| 2005 | Bichunmoo (The Dance in the Sky) | (voice) | SBS |
| 2005 | Hong Kong Express | Shin Kyung-ja | SBS |
| 2005 | Smile of Spring Day | Im Dae-boem's mother | MBC |
| 2005 | Tears of Diamond | Son In-ha's mother | SBS |
| 2005 | Bizarre Bunch | Jung Na-ra | KBS1 |
| 2005 | Let's Get Married | Hong Na-young's mother | MBC |
| 2006 | Fireworks | Park Jin-hwa | MBC |
| 2006 | Barefoot Love | Mrs. Yang | SBS |
| 2006 | My Love | Jo Yi-han's mother | SBS |
| 2006 | High Kick! | Park Hae-mi's mother (cameo, episode 80) | MBC |
| 2007 | The Person I Love | Jo Young-sook | SBS |
| 2007 | Winter Bird | Sook-ja | MBC |
| 2008 | My Lady | Lee Soon-hwa | MBC |
| 2008 | My Life's Golden Age | Kim Hee-kyung | MBC |
| 2009 | Can Anyone Love? | Park Ae-sook | SBS |
| 2009 | What's for Dinner? | Jung Sun-woo's mother (cameo) | MBC |
| 2009 | Enjoy Life | Na Ok-bong | MBC |
| 2010 | Dong Yi | Queen Myeongseong | MBC |
| 2010 | Three Sisters | Park Young-ok | SBS |
| 2010 | Queen of Reversals | Na Young-ja | MBC |
| 2011 | Twinkle Twinkle | Jin Na-hee | MBC |
| 2011 | Living in Style | Chun Yeon-deok | SBS |
| 2012 | Still You | Kim Yi-hyun | SBS |
| 2012 | It Was Love | Ahn Soo-mi | MBC |
| 2013 | Potato Star 2013QR3 | Mi-sook (cameo, episode 7) | tvN |
| 2013 | Hold My Hand | Na Geum-ja | MBC |
| 2013 | One Warm Word | Mrs. Choo | SBS |
| 2014 | Mama | Kang Myung-ja | MBC |
| 2014 | Make a Wish | Kang Jin-hee's mother | MBC |
| 2014 | Tears of Heaven | Mrs. Jo | MBN |
| 2014 | Lady of the Storm | Lee Myung-ae | MBC |
| 2014 | Drama Festival: "Fitting" | 50-year-old Kyung-hee | MBC |
| 2016 | Marriage Contract | Yoon Seon-yeong | MBC |
| 2016 | The Good Wife | Oh Jung-im (cameo) | tvN |
| 2016 | Don't Dare to Dream | Hwa-shin's mother | SBS |
| 2018 | My Contracted Husband, Mr. Oh | Park Jung-ok | MBC |
| 2019 | Mother of Mine | Ha Mi-ok | KBS2 |

=== Variety show ===
| Year | Title | Network | Notes/Ref. |
|---|---|---|---|
| 1994 | Aerobic Gymnastics of Life | MBC | MC |
| 1994 | TV School Board | KBS2 | MC |
| 2007 | Diet War | Story On | MC |
| 2017 | Happy Together | KBS2 | Episode 486 with Lee Kye-in |
| 2018 | Battle Trip | KBS2 | Episode 76-77 with Gong Hyun-joo |
| 2022 | Attack on Grandma | Channel S | Host |
| 2025 | Mental Warrior | YouTube | |

== Theater ==
| Year | English title | Korean title | Role | Ref. |
|---|---|---|---|---|
| 2022 | Jangsu Sangho | 장수상회 | Geum-nim | |
| 2023 | My Mother | 친정엄마 | Bongran | |

== Bibliography ==
| Year | Title | Publisher |
|---|---|---|
| 2005 | Park Jung-soo's Inner Beauty | Image Box |

== Awards and nominations ==
| Year | Award | Category | Nominated work | Result |
|---|---|---|---|---|
| 1974 | MBC Drama Awards | Best New Actress | | Won |
| 2010 | MBC Drama Awards | Golden Acting Award, Veteran Actress | Enjoy Life, Queen of Reversals | Won |
