= Make Your Wish =

- Promotional poster
- Also known as: Make a Wish
- Genre: Melodrama; Romance
- Written by: Park Eon-hee
- Directed by: Choi Won-suk; Lee Jae-jin
- Starring: Oh Ji-eun; Ki Tae-young
- Country of origin: South Korea
- Original language: Korean
- No. of episodes: 122

Production
- Executive producer: Kim Kyung-hee
- Producer: Kim Hyun-jeong
- Running time: 40 minutes
- Production companies: Shinyoung E&C Group

Original release
- Network: Munhwa Broadcasting Corporation
- Release: June 23, 2014 – January 2, 2015

Make Your Wish (Korean: 소원을 말해봐; RR: Sowoneul malhaebwa; lit. Tell Me Your Wish) is a 2014 South Korean drama television series starring Oh Ji-eun and Ki Tae-young. It aired on MBC from June 23, 2014 to January 2, 2015 on Mondays to Fridays at 19:15 for 120 episodes.

== Plot ==
Han So-won struggles to prove the innocence of her husband, who is framed for embezzlement and ends up in a vegetative state after an accident.

== Cast ==
- Oh Ji-eun as Han So-won
- Ki Tae-young as Kang Jin-hee
- Yoo Ho-rin as Song Yi-hyun
  - Lee Go-eun as young Yi-hyun
- Kim Mi-kyung as Lee Jung-sook
- Song Yoo-jung as Han Da-won
- Park Jae-jung as Jang Hyun-woo
- Lee Deok-hee as Kim Choo-cha
- Lee Jong-soo as Jang Gyun-woo
- Cha Hwa-yeon as Shin Hye-ran
- Yeon Joon-seok as Song Seok-hyun
- Kim Young-ok as Chairman Choi
- Im Ji-eun as Jo Myung-hee
- Kim Byung-choon as Ji Sang-geun
- Ahn Yong-joon as Kim Deok-kyu

== Awards and nominations ==
Year	Award	Category	Recipient	Result
2014	MBC Drama Awards	Excellence Award, Actor in a Serial Drama	Ki Tae-young	Nominated
2014	MBC Drama Awards	Excellence Award, Actress in a Serial Drama	Oh Ji-eun	Nominated

== International broadcast ==
- It aired in Vietnam on HTV2 from December 17, 2015.
- It aired in Singapore on Mediacorp Channel U from April 26, 2017.
