= Potato Star 2013QR3 =

South Korean situation comedy

- Promotional poster
- Genre: Sitcom
- Written by: Lee Young-chul; Lee Gwang-jae; Jang Jin-ah
- Directed by: Kim Byung-wook
- Starring: Lee Soon-jae; Yeo Jin-goo; Ha Yeon-soo; Ko Kyung-pyo; Seo Yea-ji
- Country of origin: South Korea
- Original language: Korean
- No. of episodes: 120

Production
- Production location: South Korea
- Production company: Chorokbaem Media

Original release
- Network: tvN
- Release: 23 September 2013 – 15 May 2014

Potato Star 2013QR3 (Korean: 감자별 2013QR3; RR: Gamjabyeol 2013QR3) is a South Korean television sitcom. It aired on tvN from September 23, 2013, to May 15, 2014, on Mondays to Thursdays at 20:50 for 120 episodes.

== Plot ==
A mysterious asteroid nearly crash-lands on Earth in 2013 and causes strange things to happen, specifically to the Noh family and their neighbors. The show begins with Na Jin Ah and her mother Gil Sun-Ja living in a shabby house on the outskirts of Seoul. Jin-Ah dreams of pursuing a career in Kong Kong, a toy company, which her late father contributed to, but due to a lack of a college degree and experience, her application is rejected from the screening process. Meanwhile, the eldest son of the Noh family, Noh Min-Hyuk, prepares to inherit the role of CEO in Kong Kong. Also, the current CEO and head of the Noh family, Noh Soo-Dong is preparing to leave the company due to bladder sensitivity issues. Other members of the Noh family include the father of Soo-Dong, Noh Song, his wife Wang Yoo-Jung, their two daughters, Noh Bo-Young and Noh Soo-Young, and their pet dog, Cheol-Min.

== Cast ==
=== The Noh family ===
- Lee Soon-jae as Noh Song
- Roh Joo-hyun as Noh Soo-dong
- Geum Bo-ra as Wang Yoo-jung
- Ko Kyung-pyo as Noh Min-hyuk
- Seo Yea-ji as Noh Soo-young
- Choi Song-hyun as Noh Bo-young
- Kim Jung-min as Kim Do-sang mama
- Kim Dan-yul as Kim Kyu-young
- Jung Joon-won as Kim Kyu-ho

=== Their neighbors ===
- Ha Yeon-soo as Na Jin-ah
- Oh Young-shil as Gil Seon-ja
- Kang Nam-gil as Na Se-dol
- Yeo Jin-goo as Hong Hye-sung / Noh Jun-hyuk
- Chang Kiha as Jang Yul
- Kim Kwang-kyu as Director Oh
- Julien Kang as Julien
- Mina Fujii as Mina Fujii
- Park Eun-ji as Kim Ji-hyun
- Yoon Seo-hyun as Yoon Seo-hyun
- Kim Sung-eun as Kim Sung-eun
- Kim Sung-min as Kim Ui-chan
- Jung Hye-sung as Park Seung-hee
- Park Hwi-soon as Park Hwi-soon
- Na Seung-ho as Min-hyuk's friend
- Yang Joo-ho as office manager of law firm

=== Cameos and guest appearances ===
- Hwang Jung-eum as Soo-dong's secretary (ep 1)
- Yoo In-na as jogging woman, Do-sang's dream girl (ep 4, 6)
- Park Jung-soo as Mi-sook (ep 7)
- Yoon Kye-sang as brain surgeon Kye-sang (ep 9–10)
- Park Kyung-lim as Bo-young's husky voice (ep 10)
- So Yoo-jin as suspicious housekeeper (ep 11)
- Sunwoo Yong-nyeo as Noh Song's younger sister (ep 14)
- Lee Jong-suk as Jong-suk (ep 15)
- Jung Woong-in as dog's voice (ep 15)
- Jung Yoo-geun as a kid on the bus with Julian (ep 17)
- Lee Kwang-soo as movie director, Bo-young's first love (ep 18)
- Park Ha-sun as president of Jang Yul's fan club (ep 30)
- Kiha & The Faces (ep 30)
- Seo Ji-seok as basketball teammate of young Noh Song (ep 38)
- Yoo Jung-hyun as interview program host (ep 38)
- Choi Woong as Lee Ji-hun, Noh Soo-young's blind date (Ep. 40)
- Yoon Ki-won as martial arts studio master (ep 47)
- Jeong Jun-ha as Wang Jun-ha (ep 55)
- Na Yeong-seok as police officer (ep 66)
- Choi Eun-kyeong as Do-sang's cousin (ep 68)
- Jang Hang-jun as professor (ep 69)
- Im Sung-min as professor's wife (ep 69)
- Seo Shin-ae as Seo Shin-ae (ep 79)
- Choi Hong-man as Choi Hong-man (ep 79)
- Krystal Jung as Jung Soo-jung (ep 81)
- Ahn Nae-sang as photographer (ep 87)
- Gong Seo-young as Gong Seo-young (ep 95, 98–99)
- Kim Hye-seong as delivery boy (ep 100)
- Noh Hyung-ok as AWOL soldier (ep 100)
- Oh Seung-eun as Min Ji-yeon's mother (ep 103)
- Jang Jung-hee as Yoo-jung's high school schoolmate (ep 109)
- Yoon Gun as Soo-young's friend (ep 111)
- Yoon Yoo-sun as bakeshop owner (ep 112)
- Lee Juck as ex-boyfriend of young Seon-ja (ep 114)

== Original soundtrack ==
Potato Star 2013QR3 OST - Part 1

Soundtrack album by Kanto & Dindin feat. Linzy of Fiestar
- Released: October 7, 2013
- Genre: Soundtrack
- Language: Korean
- Label: Chorokbaem Media, LOEN Entertainment

=== Track list ===
No.	Title	Length
1.	"Potato Star 2013QR3)" (Kanto & Dindin feat. Linzy of Fiestar)	3:16
2.	"감자별 2013QR3 (Potato Star 2013QR3) (Inst.)"	3:16

Potato Star 2013QR3 OST - Part 2

Soundtrack album by Kwon Soon-kwan
- Released: March 3, 2014
- Language: Korean
- Label: Chorokbaem Media, LOEN Entertainment

=== Track list ===
No.	Title	Length
1.	"내게로 오면 돼" (Kwon Soon-kwan)	4:45

Potato Star 2013QR3 OST - Part 3

Soundtrack album by Kwon Soon-kwan
- Released: April 7, 2014
- Genre: Soundtrack
- Language: Korean
- Label: Chorokbaem Media, LOEN Entertainment

=== Track list ===
No.	Title	Length
1.	"아직도 난" (Kwon Soon-kwan)	4:34
