= Living in Style =

- Promotional poster
- Also known as: Live in Style; I'll Live with Style
- Genre: Family; Comedy
- Written by: Moon Young-nam
- Directed by: Hong Chang-wook
- Starring: Ki Tae-young; Yoon Se-in
- Country of origin: South Korea
- Original language: Korean
- No. of episodes: 51

Production
- Producer: Oh Se-kang (SBS)
- Production company: Samhwa Networks

Original release
- Network: SBS TV
- Release: 17 September 2011 – 11 March 2012

Living in Style (Korean: 폼나게 살거야; RR: Pomnage salgeoya) is a 2011 South Korean weekend family drama series starring Ki Tae-young and Yoon Se-in. It aired on SBS TV from September 17, 2011 to March 11, 2012, on Saturdays and Sundays at 21:50 for 51 episodes.

== Plot ==
Three families struggle to overcome their problems and live in style.

In the first family, Mo Sung-ae struggles to overcome the difficult hand life has dealt her, and care for her four children — two of them are angels, but two are selfish little devils.

The Choi family is an affluent family dealing with the recent loss of their patriarch, and a mother trying to retain control of her late husband's assets from her stepson. Choi Shin-hyung, her biological son and chosen successor, is forced to choose between fulfilling his mother's wishes, and losing it all for his longtime girlfriend.

The Jo family is a middle-class family led by patriarch Jo Yong-pal, a building security guard, who loves Mo Sung-ae. His jobless, lazy son, Jo Jin-sang, and his daughter-in-law, Lee Hae-shim, add an endearing, but comical flavor to the group.

== Cast ==
Na family

- Lee Hyo-chun as Mo Sung-ae
- Son Hyun-joo as Na Dae-ra
- Choi Su-rin as Nam Eun-jung
- Kim Hee-jung as Na No-ra
- Yoon Se-in as Na Ah-ra
- Choi Woo-shik as Na Joo-ra
- Kim Ji-min as Na Geum-sung
- Nam Da-reum as Na Hwa-sung

Choi family

- Park Jung-soo as Chun Yeon-duk
- Ki Tae-young as Choi Shin-hyung
- Chae Young-in as Choi So-hyung
- Yoon Seo-hyun as Choi Goo-hyung

Jo family

- Roh Joo-hyun as Jo Yong-pal
- Son Jong-beom as Jo Jin-sang
- Lee Sang-sook as Lee Hae-shim

Extended cast

- Oh Dae-gyu as Shin Ki-han
- Lee Jung-gil as Yeon Goo-joong
- Kim Min-hyuk as Park Bi-seo
- Go Se-won as Jo Eun-kul
- Yoo Se-rye as Eun Geum-hee
- Jang Se-yoon as Noh Rin-da
- Park Yong-soo as Shin Moon-suk
- Jang Da-yoon as Lee Pal-pal
- Oh Hee-joon as Sa Daek-yook
- Yoo Seung-bong as Lee Dae-pal

Cameo

- Hyun Young
- Ahn Nae-sang
- Jo Sung-ha
- Song Kyung-chul as Mo Sung-ae's husband
- Kim Hyun-soo as Jo Han-yi
- Min Joon-hyun as Choi Goo-hyung's friend

== Awards and nominations ==
Year	Award	Category	Recipient	Result
2011	19th SBS Drama Awards	Top Excellence Award, Actor in a Weekend/Daily Drama	Son Hyun-joo	Nominated
2011	19th SBS Drama Awards	Special Acting Award, Actor in a Weekend/Daily Drama	Noh Joo-hyun	Nominated
