= Roh Joo-hyun =

South Korean actor

- Born: Roh Un-young; August 19, 1946 (age 80); Seoul, South Korea
- Occupation: Actor

Korean name
- Hangul: 노운영
- Hanja: 盧運永
- RR: No Unyeong
- MR: No Unyŏng

Stage name
- Hangul: 노주현
- Hanja: 盧宙鉉
- RR: No Juhyeon
- MR: No Chuhyŏn

Roh Joo-hyun (born Roh Un-young on August 19, 1946) is a South Korean actor.

== Filmography ==
=== Film ===
Year	Title	Role
1970	Nobody Knows	Yeong
1971	A Virgin Man	
1971	Fresh Love	
1975	Lust	
1976	Windmill Of My Mind	
1977	The Virgin's Castle	
1983	Stray Dog	
1991	Teenage Coup	
1992	Things That Sadden My Wife	
2002	Emergency Act 19	Chief Secretary/Kim Min-ji's father
2004	The Wolf Returns	Special appearance in edited scene
2004	Shut Up!	
2005	She's on Duty	Detective Chun
2005	The Art of Seduction	Seo Min-jun's father
2007	Master Kims	

=== Television series ===
Year	Title	Role	Network
1999	Love in 3 Colors	Company president Jang Dong-wook	KBS2
2001	Sun-hee and Jin-hee	Chairman Choi	MBC
2001	Why Can't We Stop Them		SBS
2002	Five Brothers and Sisters		SBS
2002	Honest Living	Roh Joo-hyun	SBS
2003	KBS TV Novel: "Buni"	Kang Moon-soo	KBS1
2004	War of the Roses	Lee Ki-joon	MBC
2004	Han River Ballad	Kim Young-hee's first love	MBC
2004	Stained Glass	Company president Park Jin-sung	SBS
2005	That Summer's Typhoon	Han Kwang-Suk	SBS
2006	Famous Princesses	Gong Soo-pyo	KBS2
2006	High Kick!	Seo Joo-hyun (cameo, episode 125)	MBC
2007	First Wives' Club	Mayor Choi	SBS
2007	That Woman Is Scary	Baek Dong-soo	SBS
2008	Chunja's Special Day	Lee Man-seok	MBC
2009	Three Brothers	Joo Beom-in	KBS2
2010	The Scarlet Letter	Yoon Jung-ho	MBC
2011	Living in Style	Jo Yong-pal	SBS
2012	Suspicious Family		MBN
2013	Wang's Family	Go Ji-shik	KBS2
2013	Potato Star 2013QR3	Noh Soo-dong	tvN
2014	Everybody Say Kimchi	Park Jae-han	MBC
2014	Pride and Prejudice	Lee Jong-gon	MBC
2021	Love (ft. Marriage and Divorce)	Shin Gi-rim	TV Chosun

=== Variety/radio show ===
Year	Title	Notes
2003	Hello, This is Roh Joo-hyun and Kim Yeon-joo	Radio DJ
2005	Vitamin	
2007	Happy Sunday - Cool Times, Game Song	Cast member
2009–2010	Invincible Youth - Season 1	Host

=== News show ===
Year	Title	Network	Notes
2008	Morning Wide - Human Plus		Commentator

== Theater ==
Year	Title	Role
2008	Fiddler on the Roof	Tevye
2022	Art	Serge

== Ambassadorship ==
- Ambassador of Public Relations to Seoul (2023)

== Awards and nominations ==
Year	Award	Category	Nominated work	Result
2001	SBS Drama Awards	Excellence Award, Actor	Why Can't We Stop Them	Won
2005	KBS Entertainment Awards	Top Entertainer Award	Vitamin	Won
2006	KBS Drama Awards	Best Supporting Actor	Famous Princesses	Nominated
2011	SBS Drama Awards	Special Acting Award, Actor in a Weekend/Daily Drama	Living in Style	Nominated
