= Kim Sung-eun (actress, born 1991) =

South Korean actress (born 1991)

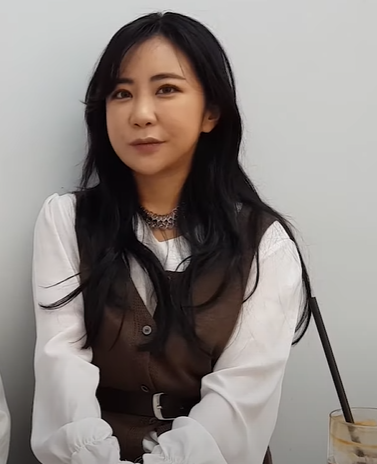
- Kim in 2020
- Born: July 23, 1991 (age 35); Seongnam, South Korea
- Education: Dongduk Women's University – Broadcasting Entertainment
- Occupation: Actress
- Years active: 1996–present
- Agent: Charles Entertainment

Korean name
- Hangul: 김성은
- RR: Gim Seongeun
- MR: Kim Sŏngŭn

Kim Sung-eun (Korean: 김성은; born July 23, 1991) is a South Korean actress. She is known for her role as Park Mi-dal in 1998 TV series Soonpoong Clinic.

== Filmography ==
=== Television series ===
Year	Title	Role
1998–2000	Soonpoong Clinic	Park Mi-dal
2002	Sidestreet People	Min-ji
2013	Potato Star 2013QR3	Kim Sung-eun

=== Film ===
Year	Title	Role
1996	Ambiguous Man	
1998	A Bug's Life	
2000	Legend School	
2014	Ghost Over Flowers	

== Awards and nominations ==
Year	Award	Category	Nominated work	Result	Ref.
1998	SBS Drama Awards	Best Young Actress	Soonpoong Clinic	Won	
