= Battle Trip =

South Korean television program

- Promotional poster for S2
- Hangul: 배틀 트립
- RR: Baeteul teurip
- MR: Paet'ŭl t'ŭrip
- Genre: Reality television Travel documentary
- Starring: Various artistes
- Opening theme: Let's Go (여행 가고싶어) by BTOB (Season 1)
- Country of origin: South Korea
- Original language: Korean
- No. of seasons: 2
- No. of episodes: 216 + 4 specials (list of episodes)

Production
- Executive producers: Jae Young-kwon (Season 1); Son Ji-won (Season 2)
- Production locations: South Korea, Asia, Europe, Middle East, North America, Oceania, Latin America
- Running time: 60–90 minutes
- Production company: KBS

Original release
- Network: KBS2
- Release: 16 April 2016 – 12 August 2023

Battle Trip (Korean: 배틀 트립) is a South Korean television entertainment program, distributed and syndicated by KBS.

Season 1 was aired starting 16 April 2016 and ended on 3 April 2020 with 177 episodes and 4 special episodes. The program starred Kim Sook, Kim Jun-hyun, Yoon Bo-mi of Apink, Lee Hwi-jae, Sung Si-kyung and San E as the main MCs. An invited celebrity will work together with the cast as a special MC to host the show.

Season 2 was aired starting 15 October 2022 and ended on 12 August 2023 with 39 episodes. The program starred Sung Si-kyung, Lee Yong-jin, Heo Kyung-hwan and Lee Mi-joo after 30 months of hiatus. From episode 1 to 9, an invited celebrity will work together with the cast as a special MC to host the show. Since episode 10, no special MCs were invited with the inclusion of Aiki to the main MC lineup.

== Overview ==
=== Season 1 ===
==== Episode 1 to 158 ====
The program is a trip competition between two groups of celebrities or several individual celebrities, travelling based on specific topics and showing viewers travel information and amazing tips. The winner is chosen based on 100 votes from the audience. To discourage cross-country travels, each group can only travel within specified cities or states as the topic stipulates.

==== Episode 159 to 177 ====
The program is revamped and the new concept focuses on the relationship between the selected destination and the guests. There will not have popularity votes from the audience of 100 and a new studio setting is used to film the program.

==== End of Season 1 ====
On 6 February 2020, it was initially announced to have its final airing of the program on 27 March 2020. Between 6 and 27 March 2020, repeat telecast of previous episodes were used due to the COVID-19 pandemic, which made travelling and filming for the show difficult. A final episode was added on 3 April 2020 to conclude the show.

During the course of the programme, 177 episodes of Battle Trip aired, including four specials, between 16 April 2016 and 3 April 2020.

=== Season 2 ===
In season 2, the trip competition is between two groups of celebrities or several individual celebrities. The winner is chosen based on votes tally from the celebrities (main mc, special mc and trip planners).

== History of audiences' votes and special segment (Season 1, Episode 1 to 158) ==
From episode 1 to 6, the winning team will be decided by the popularity votes from the 100 audiences. Each audience can only decide on supporting one team.

From episode 7 onward, the winning team will still be decided by the popularity votes from the 100 audiences but giving the 100 audiences the choices to support either one team or both.

=== Exception on audiences' votes ===
In episodes 21, 22, 39, 83, 84, 87, 88, 131, 132, 139 – 140 and 153 – 156, there are no voting from an audience of 100. These are educational trips for special historical events or informative purposes.

In episodes 42 – 45, 65 – 67, 91 – 93 and 100 – 103, as each team travelled 2 or more locations for the same battle theme, the overall winning team was decided after adding the total votes of both trips or locations (i.e. each team can get more than 100 votes).

In episodes 74 – 77, there is no voting from an audience of 100 due to the labour union strike and no audiences are invited to the show.

In episodes 116 – 119, there is no voting from an audience of 100. Instead, Lovelyz (Jiae, Jisoo, Ryu Su-jeong, Yein) and Pentagon (Hui, Hongseok, Shinwon, Yeo One) are the 8 special judges for the special theme. These 8 special judges can only pick one team each. In the event of a tie, Kim Sook will decide the winning team.

In episodes 127 – 130, Lee Hwi-jae and Kim Sook will be the special judges for The Solo Trip Special. There are four themes (essential courses, essential menus, bucket list and hidden courses) and the special judges will vote one country each for every theme. Trip designers who got chosen by the special judges will get extra five points on top of the popularity votes from the 100 audiences.

In episodes 137 – 138, there is no voting from an audience of 100. The 3 hosts made a bet to see whose trip people like the most via the social media and the one with the lowest number of votes will buy some snacks. Sung Si-kyung got the most votes and followed by Lee Hwi-jae and Kim Sook. Kim Sook bought cream buns for the 100 audiences in episode 141.

Special segment: Battle Trip Awards (2018)

A year-closing episode, Battle Trip Awards, was shown on 29 December 2018 in episode 122. In this end of the year episode, the hosts will introduce recommended vacation spots for 2019 and show some unseen footages of some of the episodes in 2018. The Battle Trip Awards ceremony presents the Hottest Issue Clip Award (hottest issue on the internet) and The Best Trip Location Award (trip designer that received the most votes). Winners of the award are presented with a trophy.

== Slogan ==
These slogans are used before the revamped of the program in Season 1, between episode 1 and 158. These slogans are again used in Season 2.

- Opening Slogan:
  - '여행도 전쟁이다 배틀 트립' (Travelling is like a battle. Battle Trip!)
- Ending Slogan:
  - '세상이 학교다 인생이 여행이다 배틀 트립' (The world is your school, and life is a trip. Battle trip!)

== Airtime ==
=== Season 1 ===
Airdate	Broadcast Start Time (KST)	
16 April 2016 – 14 May 2016	Saturdays at 11:05 pm	
21 May 2016 – 27 May 2017	Saturdays at 10:40 pm	
3 June 2017 – 1 September 2018	Saturdays at 9:15 pm	
8 September 2018 – 30 November 2019	Part 1	Saturdays at 9:15 pm
8 September 2018 – 30 November 2019	Part 2	Saturdays at 10:00 pm
6 December 2019 – 3 April 2020	Part 1	Fridays at 8:30 pm
6 December 2019 – 3 April 2020	Part 2	Fridays at 9:10 pm

=== Season 2 ===
Airdate	Broadcast Start Time (KST)
15 October 2022 – 12 August 2023	Saturdays at 10:40 pm

== Cast ==
=== Main MC ===
==== Season 1 ====
Name	Episode	Notes
Kim Sook	1 – 177	
Kim Jun-hyun	159 – 177	
Yoon Bo-mi (Apink)	159 – 177	
San E	1 – 47	
Lee Hwi-jae	1 – 158	
Sung Si-kyung	1 – 158	

==== Season 2 ====
Name	Episode	Notes
Sung Si-kyung	1 – 39	
Lee Yong-jin	1 – 39	
Heo Kyung-hwan	1 – 39	
Lee Mi-joo (Lovelyz)	1 – 39	
Aiki (Hook)	10 – 39	

=== Special MC ===
==== Season 1 ====
- San E has stepped down from the show after the episode 47 on 22 April 2017. Since then, the show would invite celebrity guest as Special MC to host the show together with the cast.

Name	Episode	Notes
Kim Ji-min	13	Stand-in MC for San E
Sejeong (Gugudan)	48 – 49	
Seo Hyo-rim	50 – 51	
Hyelin (EXID)	52 – 53	
Yura (Girl's Day)	54 – 57	
DinDin	58 – 61	
Jisook (Rainbow)	62 – 64	
Chaeyeon (Dia)	65 – 67	
Hayoung (Apink)	68 – 69	
Sam Hammington	70 – 72	
Dongwoon (Highlight)	73	
No Special MC in Episode 74 – 77
N (VIXX)	78	
Han Dong-geun	79 – 80	
Kim Tae-hoon	81 – 82	
Jung Si-ah	83 – 84	
Eric Nam	85 – 86	
No Special MC in Episode 87 – 88
JooE (Momoland)	89 – 90	
Lee Su-ji	91 – 93	
Kim Min-kyung	94 – 95	
Kim Sae-rom	96 – 97	
JR (NU'EST)	98 – 99	
Leeteuk (Super Junior)	100 – 103	
Kim Il-jung	104 – 105	
Lee Hye-jung	106 – 107	
Dayoung (WJSN)	108 – 109	
Heo Young-ji (Kara)	110 – 111	
Kim Hwan	112 – 115	
No Special MC in Episode 116 – 119
NC.A	120 – 121	
No Special MC in Episode 122
Seol In-ah	123 – 124	
No Special MC in Episode 125 – 130
Jeong Yein (Lovelyz)	131 – 134	
Shindong (Super Junior)	135 – 136	
No Special MC in Episode 137 – 138
Lee Jung-min	139 – 140	
Ju Hak-nyeon (The Boyz)	141 – 142	
Cao Lu	143 – 144	
Kim Dong-han	145 – 146	
Do Kyung-wan	147 – 148	
Lee Ji-hye	149 – 150	
Chaebin (Nature)	151 – 152	
No Special MC in Episode 153
Park Ji-won (fromis 9)	154 – 155	
No Special MC in Episode 156
Hyojung (Oh My Girl)	157 – 158	
No Special MC in Episode 159 – 160
Moonbin (Astro)	161 – 162	
No Special MC in Episode 163 – 164
Choi Bo-min (Golden Child); Ryu Su-jeong (Lovelyz); Jeong Yein (Lovelyz)	165 – 167	
Kim Hwan	167 – 168	
Jung Hyuk	169 – 177	

==== Season 2 ====
Name	Episode	Notes
Honey J (HOLYBANG)	1 – 2	
Kim Yong-jun (SG Wannabe)	3 – 4	
No Special MC in Episode 5 – 7
Kim Ji-min	8 – 9	
No Special MC since Episode 10

== Episodes ==
=== Season 1 ===
List of Episodes (Season 1)

Year	Number of Episodes	Broadcast Date	
Year	Number of Episodes	First aired	Last aired
2016	32	16 April 2016	17 December 2016
2017	42	7 January 2017	2 December 2017
2018	48	6 January 2018	29 December 2018
2019	48	5 January 2019	20 December 2019
2020	7	3 January 2020	3 April 2020
Total	177		

Team Green Team Red

==== 2016 ====
List of Episodes (episode 1 – 32)

Episodes	Broadcast Date	Theme	Destination	Trip Planner(s)	Trip Name	Budget (Note: Amount as per traveller and exclude airfare.)	Winner	Notes
1	16 April 2016	One Day Trip You Want to Leave for Now	Taebaek (Gangwon-do)	Super Junior (Leeteuk & Henry)	Descendants of Taebaek	₩187,400	Seoul Team	
1	16 April 2016	One Day Trip You Want to Leave for Now	Seoul	Doojoon (Highlight) & Seol Min-seok	Taste & History Road	₩82,300	Seoul Team	
2	23 April 2016	1 Night, 2 Days Trip On Lowest Budget	Osaka (Japan)	EXID (Hani & Solji)	Dasoni Tour	₩180,626	Osaka Team	
3	30 April 2016	1 Night, 2 Days Trip On Lowest Budget	Jeju Island	Lee Jae-hoon (Cool) & Shim Hyung-tak	Eternal Grand Place	₩140,000	Osaka Team	
4	7 May 2016	Seoul Snack Trip	Tteok-bokki tour	Apink (Eunji & Bomi)	Don't Ask Just Eat Tour	—	Bread Team	Special guest: I.O.I
4	7 May 2016	Seoul Snack Trip	Bread tour	Park Ji-yoon & Lee Won-il	Good Bread Tour	—	Bread Team	Special guest: I.O.I
5	14 May 2016	Classics from 80's and 90's	Japanese Cartoons Tour (Tokyo)	Haha, Hyun Joo-yup & Kim Seung-hyun	Slamdunk Tour	₩233,580	Japan Team	
6	21 May 2016	Classics from 80's and 90's	Chinese Movies Tour (Hong Kong)	Hong Seok-cheon & Bong Man-dae	Hong Kong Movie Tour	₩524,900	Japan Team	
7	28 May 2016	Just Men. Just Women. 2 days, 3 nights	Singapore	Lee Sang-min & Kim Il-jung	Return to Sing Tour	₩415,000	Singapore Team	
8	4 June 2016	Just Men. Just Women. 2 days, 3 nights	Vladivostok (Russia)	Kim Ok-vin & Kim Hyun-sook	Girls' 3-day trip to Vladivostok	₩270,000	Singapore Team	
9	11 June 2016	A Bonus Book of Travel Locations	Pattaya (Thailand)	Kim Min-kyo, Im Hyung-joon & Lee Jong-hyuk	"Where Are You Going Friend" Trip	₩330,000	Pattaya Team	
10	18 June 2016	A Bonus Book of Travel Locations	Macau (China)	Jonghyun (CNBLUE), Jung Joon-young & Choi Tae-joon	Real Men's Tour	₩383,000	Pattaya Team	
11	25 June 2016	Overseas Trip with a Budget of ₩990,000	Nagasaki (Japan)	Uhm Hyun-kyung & Choi Yoon-young	3 Go Tour	₩854,000	Nagasaki Team	
12	2 July 2016	Overseas Trip with a Budget of ₩990,000	Shanghai (China)	I.O.I (Jeon So-mi & Zhou Jieqiong)	Dangerous Couple's Shanghai Romance	₩625,000	Nagasaki Team	
13	9 July 2016	1 Night, 2 Days Domestic Trip with a Budget of ₩600,000	Busan	Tony An (H.O.T.) & Kim Jae-duck (Sechs Kies)	Big Brother Tour	₩431,500	Busan Team	
13	9 July 2016	1 Night, 2 Days Domestic Trip with a Budget of ₩600,000	Gangwon-do	Lee Guk-joo & Ahn Young-mi	Welcome to Gangwon-do	₩578,000	Busan Team	
14	16 July 2016	Tourist Spot vs Relaxing Spot	Tokyo (Japan)	Defconn (Hyungdon and Daejun) & San E	Show Me the Tokyo	₩758,000	Saipan Team	
15	23 July 2016	Tourist Spot vs Relaxing Spot	Saipan	Lee Jae-hoon (Cool), Ye Jung-hwa & Muzie	"Win By Day and Night" Tour	₩984,000	Saipan Team	
16	30 July 2016	1 Night, 2 Days in Taiwan	Taiwan	Kim Jong-min (Koyote) & Ji Sang-ryeol	Old Boy Tour	₩228,000	BtoB Team	
16	30 July 2016	1 Night, 2 Days in Taiwan	Taiwan	BtoB (Sungjae, Eunkwang & Hyunsik)	Ttuittui Ppangppang Tour	₩205,500	BtoB Team	
–	No new episode between 6 August and 20 August 2016 due to Rio de Janeiro 2016 Olympics							
17	27 August 2016	MC Special: Fall Trip Abroad	Beijing (China)	Lee Hwi-jae, Jo Se-ho & Nam Chang-hee	Beijing Theater	—	Tokyo Team	
18	3 September 2016	MC Special: Fall Trip Abroad	Tokyo (Japan)	Sung Si-kyung & Moon Chun-sik	Trip for the Ladies	—	Tokyo Team	
19	10 September 2016	Enjoy the Trip Like Locals	Philippines	Sandara Park (2NE1) & Kang Seung-hyun	Dara Tour	₩230,000	Vietnam Team	No broadcast on 17 September due to Chuseok Special movie telecast
20	24 September 2016	Enjoy the Trip Like Locals	Vietnam	Kim Tae-hoon & Jo Seung-yeon	CEO Kim, Secretary Jo	₩199,000	Vietnam Team	No broadcast on 17 September due to Chuseok Special movie telecast
21	1 October 2016	Unique Destination Part 1	Busan	Seo Kyung-duk & Yoo Jae-hwan	An Island Thing Tour	—	—	Special guest: Tyler Rasch
22	8 October 2016	Unique Destination Part 2	Seoul	Sam Hammington & Sam Okyere	Two Sam Tour	—	—	
23	15 October 2016	MC Special: Fall Trip in Korea	Jeolla Province	Kim Sook & Park So-hyun	SookSo Tour	—	Jeolla Team	
24	22 October 2016	MC Special: Fall Trip in Korea	Gyeongsang Province	Hwang Kwanghee (ZE:A) & San E	'Meet. Meat' Tour	—	Jeolla Team	
25	29 October 2016	North vs South Region of Thailand	Chiang Mai (North Thailand)	Seo In-young & Lee Ji-hye	Girl Crush Tour	₩260,000	Krabi Team	Special guest: Kim Min-kyo
26	5 November 2016	North vs South Region of Thailand	Krabi (South Thailand)	H.O.T. (Tony An & Kangta) & Lee Jin-ho	Hot Thai Ho	₩250,000	Krabi Team	Special guest: Kim Min-kyo
27	12 November 2016	2 Destinations with 1 Plane Ticket (Part 1)	Dubai (UAE)	Seo Hyo-rim & Lee Chung-ah	Dubaitaly Tour	—	Dubai Team	
28	19 November 2016	2 Destinations with 1 Plane Ticket (Part 1)	London (England, UK)	Lee Kyu-han & Kim Ki-bang	B.B Tour	—	Dubai Team	
29	26 November 2016	2 Destinations with 1 Plane Ticket (Part 1)	Czech Republic	Lee Kyu-han & Kim Ki-bang	B.B Tour	—	Czech Republic Team	
30	3 December 2016	2 Destinations with 1 Plane Ticket (Part 1)	Southern Italy	Seo Hyo-rim & Lee Chung-ah	Dubaitaly Tour	—	Czech Republic Team	
31	10 December 2016	Undiscovered Destinations	Kagoshima (Kyushu, Japan)	Kim Ji-min & Kim Min-kyung	Jiminkyoung Tour	₩438,000	Kagoshima Team	
32	17 December 2016	Undiscovered Destinations	Guilin (Guangxi, China)	Park Sung-kwang & Heo Kyung-hwan	River Mountain Tour	₩310,000	Kagoshima Team	
–	No new episode on 24 December and 31 December 2016 due to 2016 KBS Entertainment Awards and 2016 KBS Drama Awards Live Telecast							

==== 2017 ====
List of Episodes (episode 33 – 75)

Episodes	Broadcast Date	Theme	Destination	Trip Planner(s)	Trip Name	Budget	Winner	Notes
33	7 January 2017	New Year Special: Battle of the Masters	Philippines	Sandara Park (2NE1) & Kang Seung-hyun	Dara Tour Part 2	₩202,400	Bangkok Team	
34	14 January 2017	New Year Special: Battle of the Masters	Bangkok (Thailand)	Kim Min-kyo, Han Jung-soo & Im Hyung-joon	MK Tour Part 2	₩232,000	Bangkok Team	
35	21 January 2017	Drinking Trip	Sapporo (Hokkaido, Japan)	Park Na-rae & Jang Do-yeon	One Shot Tour	₩592,000	Sapporo Team	No broadcast on 28 January due to specialty movie telecast
36	4 February 2017	Drinking Trip	Qingdao (Shandong, China)	Super Junior (Shindong & Leeteuk)	ShinLeeKoala Tour	₩344,000	Sapporo Team	No broadcast on 28 January due to specialty movie telecast
37	11 February 2017	Real Noodle Road Trip	Hanoi (Vietnam)	Taecyeon (2PM) & Kim Kwang-kyu	Good Morning, Vietnam Tour	₩184,000	Hanoi Team	
38	18 February 2017	Real Noodle Road Trip	Takamatsu (Kagawa, Japan)	Lee Yong-jin & Yang Se-chan	Wow Tour	₩320,100	Hanoi Team	
39	25 February 2017	Independence Movement Day Special	Shanghai	Seo Kyung-deok, Yoo Jae-hwan & DinDin	Din-Jae-Duk Historical Tour	—	—	
40	4 March 2017	Overnight Trip for Office Workers	Daegu	Gugudan (Sejeong & Nayoung)	OngDong Tour in Daegu	₩264,000	Yeosu Team	
41	11 March 2017	Overnight Trip for Office Workers	Yeosu	Kim Dae-sung, Oh Nami & Park So-yeong	Ohsosung Tour to Yeosu	₩241,200	Yeosu Team	
42 43 44 45	18 March 2017; 25 March 2017; 1 April 2017; 8 April 2017	Bucket List Destinations	Las Vegas (Nevada, USA)	Sistar (Soyou & Dasom)	Full Full Tour	—	Las Vegas Team	
42 43 44 45	18 March 2017; 25 March 2017; 1 April 2017; 8 April 2017	Bucket List Destinations	Canada	Lee Ki-woo & Lee Yi-kyung	Pop Pop Tour	—	Las Vegas Team	
46	15 April 2017	One Year Anniversary Special	Jeju Island	Lee Hwi-jae, Kim Sook, Sung Si-kyung & San E	MC Tour - My Solo Travel	—	Kim Sook	
47	22 April 2017	One Year Anniversary Special	Jeju Island	Lee Hwi-jae, Kim Sook, Sung Si-kyung & San E	MC Tour - My Solo Travel	—	Kim Sook	
48	29 April 2017	Destinations Not Well-known	Langkawi (Kedah, Malaysia)	Han Chae-ah & Ha Jae-sook	Nature Lover Tour	₩656,400	Brunei Team	
49	6 May 2017	Destinations Not Well-known	Brunei	Eddy Kim, Roy Kim & Parc Jae-jung	'E.ro.parc' Tour	₩447,000	Brunei Team	
50	13 May 2017	Hong Kong vs Taiwan	Taiwan	Shindong (Super Junior) & Kim Shin-young	Shin Sibling's Tour	₩316,700	Taiwan Team	
51	20 May 2017	Hong Kong vs Taiwan	Hong Kong	JeA (Brown Eyed Girls) & Hwangbo	Hong Kong Twist Tour	₩346,800	Taiwan Team	
52	27 May 2017	Youthful Trip	Myanmar	Kim Soo-yong & Park Hwi-soon	Slow Slow Quick Quick Team	₩306,500	Laos Team	
53	3 June 2017	Youthful Trip	Laos	Highlight (Doojoon & Dongwoon)	New Laos Tour	₩321,000	Laos Team	
54	10 June 2017	Educational Trip	Bali (Indonesia)	Hyun Woo & Tim	BBali Bali Tour	₩492,000	Phuket Team	
55	17 June 2017	Educational Trip	Phuket (Thailand)	Hong Seok-cheon & Yoon Park	Phuket mon Tour	₩416,000	Phuket Team	
56	24 June 2017	A Trip Both Parents and Children Can Enjoy	Okinawa (Japan)	Lee Hyun-yi & Kim Na-young	Okie Dokie Tour	₩308,000	Da Nang Team	
57	1 July 2017	A Trip Both Parents and Children Can Enjoy	Da Nang (Vietnam)	Oh Hyun-kyung & Jung Si-ah	Ms.Saigon Tour	₩248,400	Da Nang Team	
58	8 July 2017	2 Destinations with 1 Plane Ticket (Part 2)	Germany	K.Will & Lee Hyun	Lee K Tour	₩540,200	Poland Team	
59	15 July 2017	2 Destinations with 1 Plane Ticket (Part 2)	Poland	Kim So-eun & Jo Bo-ah	Soboru Tour	₩548,500	Poland Team	
60	22 July 2017	2 Destinations with 1 Plane Ticket (Part 2)	Denmark	K.Will & Lee Hyun	Lee K Tour	₩592,500	Denmark Team	
61	29 July 2017	2 Destinations with 1 Plane Ticket (Part 2)	Hungary	Kim So-eun & Jo Bo-ah	Soboru Tour	₩477,200	Denmark Team	
62	5 August 2017	Swimming Holiday	Waterpark	GFriend (Umji, SinB & Yuju)	LOL Park Tour	—	Water Sports Team	
62	5 August 2017	Swimming Holiday	Water Sports	BtoB (Eunkwang, Minhyuk & Changsub)	Best Water Park Tour	—	Water Sports Team	
63	12 August 2017	Encore Episode of Battle Trip	Vladivostok (Russia)	Muzie & Yoo Se-yoon	Love UV Tour	₩248,000	Vladivostok Team	
64	19 August 2017	Encore Episode of Battle Trip	Hokkaido (Japan)	Lee Guk-joo & Park Na-rae	Kaedo Kaedo Hokkaido Tour	₩469,000	Vladivostok Team	
65 66 67	26 August 2017; 2 September 2017; 9 September 2017	Chuseok Holiday Special: Latin America Trip	Cancún (Mexico)	Kangnam (M.I.B) & Lee Tae-gon	Tequila Brothers Tour	₩1,395,000	Cuba Team (Round 1), Mexico Team (Round 2)	
65 66 67	26 August 2017; 2 September 2017; 9 September 2017	Chuseok Holiday Special: Latin America Trip	Cuba	Kim Tae-hoon & Lee Won-suk	Cuba Libre Tour	₩455,000	Cuba Team (Round 1), Mexico Team (Round 2)	
68	16 September 2017	Food Bucket List Trip Special	Singapore	Yoo Min-sang & Moon Se-yoon	SeSang Tasty Trip	₩452,300	Kobe & Osaka Team	
69	23 September 2017	Food Bucket List Trip Special	Kobe & Osaka (Japan)	Jo Se-ho & Nam Chang-hee	ChoNam Trip	₩535,100	Kobe & Osaka Team	
70 71 72	30 September 2017; 7 October 2017; 14 October 2017	Travel to a Different City in Australia (Queensland)	Cairns	Jinwoon (2AM) & Kwon Hyuk-soo	AuCair AuCair Tour	₩1,021,500	Brisbane Team (Round 1), Cairns Team (Round 2)	
70 71 72	30 September 2017; 7 October 2017; 14 October 2017	Travel to a Different City in Australia (Queensland)	Brisbane	SNSD (Hyoyeon & Sunny)	Brisburning Tour	₩649,000	Brisbane Team (Round 1), Cairns Team (Round 2)	
73	21 October 2017	A Domestic Trip to Enjoy the Fall More	Gunsan	WJSN (Cheng Xiao & Eunseo)	I Wish Gunsan Tour	₩84,300	Gyeongju Team	
73	21 October 2017	A Domestic Trip to Enjoy the Fall More	Gyeongju	Lovelyz (Ryu Su-jeong & Jeong Ye-in)	Gyeongju Tour with Deer Bread	₩159,000	Gyeongju Team	
–	No new episode between 28 October and 18 November 2017 due to The Unit: Idol Rebooting Project telecast, 25 November due to KBS strike							
74	2 December 2017	Unique Places in Hong Kong and Taiwan	Lantau Island, Hong Kong	Mamamoo (Moonbyul & Solar)	Yong Kong Byul Kong Hong Kong Tour	₩426,100	—	
75	6 January 2018	Unique Places in Hong Kong and Taiwan	Kaohsiung, Chiayi, Tainan (South-western Taiwan)	Apink (Chorong & Hayoung)	Oh Amazing Tour	₩348,800	—	
–	No new episode between 9 December and 30 December 2017 due to KBS strike.							

==== 2018 ====
List of Episodes (episode 76 – 122)

Episodes	Broadcast Date	Theme	Destination	Trip Planner(s)	Trip Name	Budget	Winner	Notes
76	13 January 2018	A Unique Hot Spring Trip	Nha Trang (Vietnam)	Park Jung-soo & Gong Hyun-joo	Guide Kong's Nha Trang Tour	₩225,900	—	
77	20 January 2018	A Unique Hot Spring Trip	Fukuoka (Japan)	Yang Jung-a & Yoon Hae-young	Fuku, Fuku, Fukuoka Hot Spring Trip	₩302,000	—	
–	No broadcast on 27 January 2018 due to International Friendly soccer match between South Korea & Moldova							
78	3 February 2018	PyeongChang 2018 Winter Olympics Special (Day trip with a Budget of ₩100,000)	Pyeongchang	Seventeen (Mingkyu & Seungkwan)	BuGyu Trip	₩96,000	Gangneung Team	
78	3 February 2018	PyeongChang 2018 Winter Olympics Special (Day trip with a Budget of ₩100,000)	Gangneung	INFINITE (Sungjong & Woohyun)	Namsimi & Jongsimi's Tour	₩79,000	Gangneung Team	
–	No broadcast on 10 February 2018 due to 2018 PyeongChang Winter Olympics							
79	17 February 2018	California, the West Coast of USA Special	Northern California (San Francisco)	Choi Jung-won (UN) & Kim Ji-hoon	Cluck Cluck Tour	₩817,500	Southern California Team	
80	23 February 2018	California, the West Coast of USA Special	Southern California (Los Angeles)	Girl's Day (Yura & Minah)	Yul Bang Tour	₩623,000	Southern California Team	
81	3 March 2018	England Special	Manchester (UK)	Highlight (Doojoon & Gikwang)	HighMan Action Tour	₩660,900	Manchester Team	
82	10 March 2018	England Special	Liverpool (UK)	Lee Jong-hyuk & Im Hyung-joon	JJ Tour	₩500,300	Manchester Team	
83	17 March 2018	Good Tourist Destinations for Couples	Bali (Indonesia)	Choi Dong-seok & Park Ji-yoon	Reset Tour	₩550,700	—	
84	24 March 2018	Good Tourist Destinations for Couples	Penang (Malaysia)	Jin Tae-hyun & Park Si-eun	Lively Park and Jin Tour	₩396,500	—	

Episodes	Broadcast Date	Theme	Destination	Trip Designer	Travellers	Trip Name	Budget	Winner	Notes
85	31 March 2018	A Local's Travel Plan Special	Hanoi (Vietnam)	Yeom Gyeong-hwan	Yeom Gyeong-hwan, Choi Eun-kyung & Ahn Sun-yeong	Yeom Tour	₩217,700	Hanoi Team	
86	7 April 2018	A Local's Travel Plan Special	Boracay (Philippines)	Ryan Bang	Ryan Bang, Boom & Lee Ji-hye	Ryan Bang Tour	₩530,000	Hanoi Team	

Episodes	Broadcast Date	Theme	Destination	Trip Planner(s)	Trip Name	Budget	Winner	Notes
87	14 April 2018	Two Year Anniversary Special in Guam	Guam	Lee Hwi-jae, Kim Sook & Sung Si-kyung	MC's Self-designed Trip & Viewers' Recommendation	—	—	
88	21 April 2018	Two Year Anniversary Special in Guam	Guam	Lee Hwi-jae, Kim Sook & Sung Si-kyung	MC's Self-designed Trip & Viewers' Recommendation	—	—	
89	28 April 2018	Spring Travel of 20-year olds (I.O.I vs Wanna One)	Sunchon & Gwangyang	Kang Mi-na (Gugudan) & Choi Yoo-jung (Weki Meki)	YooBom NaBom Tour	₩162,850	Jinju & Hadong Team	
90	5 May 2018	Spring Travel of 20-year olds (I.O.I vs Wanna One)	Jinju & Hadong	Wanna One (Park Ji-hoon & Park Woo-jin)	Pink Sausage Tour	₩298,000	Jinju & Hadong Team	
91 92 93	12 May 2018; 19 May 2018; 26 May 2018	International Festival	Bagan & Yangon (Myanmar)	So-jin (Girl's Day) & Shin A-young	Firefighting Tour	₩985,300	Thailand Team	
91 92 93	12 May 2018; 19 May 2018; 26 May 2018	International Festival	Pai & Chiang Mai (Thailand)	VIXX (Hongbin & N)	Two Men Trip	₩219,000	Thailand Team	
94	2 June 2018	Supplement, Counterattack of Travel Sites	Hangzhou (Zhejiang, China)	Park So-hyun & Hong Hyun-hee	Toad Tour	₩289,900	Kyoto Team	
95	9 June 2018	Supplement, Counterattack of Travel Sites	Kyoto (Japan)	Mimi (Oh My Girl) & Kim Shin-young	To Go or Not to Go Kyoto Tour	₩560,200	Kyoto Team	
96	16 June 2018	Domestic Island Trip	Gyeongsang	Kim Seung-soo & Park Jung-chul	1 Day 3 Meal Tour	₩190,700	Gyeongsang Team	No broadcast on 23 June due to 2018 FIFA World Cup match live telecast
97	30 June 2018	Domestic Island Trip	Jeolla	Kim Hyun-chul & Cho Jang-hyuk	Why Together Tour	₩189,000	Gyeongsang Team	No broadcast on 23 June due to 2018 FIFA World Cup match live telecast
98	7 July 2018	Emerging Vacation Spots of 2018	Phú Quốc (Kiên Giang, Vietnam)	Song Kyung-a & Song Hae-na	Songs' Vacation	₩488,000	Vietnam Team	
99	14 July 2018	Emerging Vacation Spots of 2018	Khao Yai (Nakhon Nayok, Thailand)	Park Eun-hye & An Mi-na	An and Park's Tour	₩209,000	Vietnam Team	
100 101 102 103	21 July 2018; 28 July 2018; 4 August 2018; 11 August 2018	The Country I Want to Live In	Kingston, Sault Ste. Marie, Niagara Falls & Niagara-on-the-Lake (Canada)	Lee Hong-gi (F.T. Island) & Seo Hyo-rim	Real-life Brother and Sister Tour	₩1,315,300	Austria Team (Both Round)	
100 101 102 103	21 July 2018; 28 July 2018; 4 August 2018; 11 August 2018	The Country I Want to Live In	Vienna, Salzburg & Krems an der Donau (Austria)	Red Velvet (Wendy & Seulgi)	Diggydiggydib Tour	₩1,306,400	Austria Team (Both Round)	
104	18 August 2018	Last-minute Summer Vacation	Cebu (Philippines)	Oh Nami & Lee Soo-kyung	52 Tour or Oh-Lee Tour	₩285,000	Chengdu Team	
105	25 August 2018	Last-minute Summer Vacation	Chengdu (Sichuan, China)	So Yoo-jin & Kang Rae-yeon	Really Awesome Tour (真的好 Tour)	₩269,000	Chengdu Team	
106	1 September 2018	Romantic Getaways for Married Couple	Kota Kinabalu (Sabah, Malaysia)	Choi Yang-rak & Paeng Hyun-sook	Balu Tour	₩456,000	Kota Kinabalu Team	
107	8 September 2018	Romantic Getaways for Married Couple	Hokkaido (Japan)	Kim Yoon-ah (Jaurim) & Kim Hyung-kyu	Manman tour	₩313,000	Kota Kinabalu Team	
108	15 September 2018	2018 Newest Edition of Jeju Island	Seogwipo	Shinhwa (Kim Dong-wan & Jun Jin)	Wan Jun Tour	₩323,000	Jeju City Team	
109	22 September 2018	2018 Newest Edition of Jeju Island	Jeju City	NU'EST (JR & Baekho)	Baekho Tour	₩287,000	Jeju City Team	
110	29 September 2018	Trip for Sisters Special	Xiamen (Fujian, China)	Yang Hee-eun & Yang Hee-kyung	Unexpected Gift Tour	₩327,000	Xiamen Team	
111	6 October 2018	Trip for Sisters Special	Kenting (Pingtung, Taiwan)	Lovelyz (Mijoo & Seo Ji-soo)	Lovelyz Excitement Tour	₩360,200	Xiamen Team	
112	13 October 2018	Domestic Autumn Trip	Danyang (North Chungcheong)	Kangnam (M.I.B), Tae Jin-ah & Choi Tae-sung	Father and Son Tour	₩167,000	Mokpo Team	
113	20 October 2018	Domestic Autumn Trip	Mokpo (South Jeolla)	Moon Chun-sik, Shim Hyun-bo & Noh Jung-hoon	Nilriiri Ten Thousand Steps Tour	₩179,200	Mokpo Team	
114	27 October 2018	A Hidden Destination You Should; Visit Before it Becomes Famous	Bandung (Indonesia)	Lee Su-ji & Song Da-eun	Chatter Signal Tour	₩229,000	Bandung Team	
115	3 November 2018	A Hidden Destination You Should; Visit Before it Becomes Famous	Sakhalin (Russia)	Momoland (JooE & Yeonwoo)	Moa Moa Tour	₩382,000	Bandung Team	
116	10 November 2018	MC Gourmet Tour Special	Venice (Italy)	Sung Si-kyung & Park Joon-woo	We Will Eat Tour	₩204,000	Barcelona Team	
117	17 November 2018	MC Gourmet Tour Special	Barcelona (Spain)	Lee Hwi-jae & Lee Won-il	The Lees' Michelin Tour	₩142,000	Barcelona Team	
118	24 November 2018	MC Gourmet Tour Special	Bologna (Italy)	Sung Si-kyung & Park Joon-woo	We Will Eat Tour	₩166,000	Bologna Team	
119	1 December 2018	MC Gourmet Tour Special	Valencia (Spain)	Lee Hwi-jae & Lee Won-il	The Lees' Michelin Tour	₩207,000	Bologna Team	
120	8 December 2018	Family Trips with Parents	Ha Long Bay (Vietnam)	Sandeul (B1A4) & Park Jun-gyu	Chandelier Tour	₩415,000	Vietnam Team	
121	15 December 2018	Family Trips with Parents	Hong Kong (China)	Shim Hye-jin & Seol In-ah	Mamma Mia Tour	₩510,000	Vietnam Team	
–	No new episode on 22 December due to 2018 KBS Entertainment Awards Live Telecast							
122	29 December 2018	Recommended Vacation Spots for 2019 and 2018 Battle Trip Awards						

==== 2019 ====
List of Episodes (episode 123 – 170)

Episodes	Broadcast Date	Theme	Destination	Trip Planner(s)	Trip Name	Budget	Winner	Notes
123	5 January 2019	New Year Special, Battle of the Masters	Bangkok (Thailand)	Shin Joo-ah & Lee Hye-Jung (model)	Jjoo Ah Tour	₩282,000	Beijing Team	
124	12 January 2019	New Year Special, Battle of the Masters	Beijing (China)	Chae Yeon & Bae Seul-ki	Bae Chae Tour	₩348,300	Beijing Team	
125	19 January 2019	MC Special – Winter Gangwon Province Trip	Gangneung	Team Kim Sook: Song Hae-na, Jin Jung-sun, MXM (Lim Young-min & Kim Dong-hyun)	Sook Tour	₩37,800	Si Kyung Tour	
125	19 January 2019	MC Special – Winter Gangwon Province Trip	Pyeongchang	Team Sung Si Kyung: Hanhae (Phantom}, MC Gree, Kim Jin-kyung	Si Kyung Tour	₩119,600	Si Kyung Tour	
126	26 January 2019	MC Special – Winter Gangwon Province Trip	Hongcheon	Team Kim Sook: Kim Jin-kyung, Jin Jung-sun, MXM (Im Young-min & Kim Dong-hyun)	Sook Tour	₩63,600	Si Kyung Tour	
126	26 January 2019	MC Special – Winter Gangwon Province Trip	Inje	Team Sung Si Kyung: Hanhae (Phantom), MC Gree, Song Hae-na	Si Kyung Tour	₩102,100	Si Kyung Tour	

Episodes	Broadcast Date	Theme	Theme of Course	Trip Planner(s)	Destination	Budget	Winner	Notes
127 128 129 130	2 February 2019; 9 February 2019; 16 February 2019; 23 February 2019	The Solo Trip Special	Essential travel courses for solo trip Essential menus for solo trip Bucket list for solo trip Hidden travel courses for solo trip	Nam Chang-hee	Paris (France)	₩616,000	1st Han Da-gam (Chiangmai); 2nd Nam Chang-hee (Paris); 3rd Heo Young-ji (Hawaii); 4th Rowoon (Nepal); 5th Key (Gyeongju)	
127 128 129 130	2 February 2019; 9 February 2019; 16 February 2019; 23 February 2019	The Solo Trip Special	Essential travel courses for solo trip Essential menus for solo trip Bucket list for solo trip Hidden travel courses for solo trip	Heo Young-ji (Kara)	Hawaii (USA)	₩1,261,000	1st Han Da-gam (Chiangmai); 2nd Nam Chang-hee (Paris); 3rd Heo Young-ji (Hawaii); 4th Rowoon (Nepal); 5th Key (Gyeongju)	
127 128 129 130	2 February 2019; 9 February 2019; 16 February 2019; 23 February 2019	The Solo Trip Special	Essential travel courses for solo trip Essential menus for solo trip Bucket list for solo trip Hidden travel courses for solo trip	Rowoon (SF9)	Nepal	₩872,000	1st Han Da-gam (Chiangmai); 2nd Nam Chang-hee (Paris); 3rd Heo Young-ji (Hawaii); 4th Rowoon (Nepal); 5th Key (Gyeongju)	
127 128 129 130	2 February 2019; 9 February 2019; 16 February 2019; 23 February 2019	The Solo Trip Special	Essential travel courses for solo trip Essential menus for solo trip Bucket list for solo trip Hidden travel courses for solo trip	Han Da-gam	Chiang Mai (Thailand)	₩534,000	1st Han Da-gam (Chiangmai); 2nd Nam Chang-hee (Paris); 3rd Heo Young-ji (Hawaii); 4th Rowoon (Nepal); 5th Key (Gyeongju)	
127 128 129 130	2 February 2019; 9 February 2019; 16 February 2019; 23 February 2019	The Solo Trip Special	Essential travel courses for solo trip Essential menus for solo trip Bucket list for solo trip Hidden travel courses for solo trip	Key (Shinee)	Gyeongju (South Korea)	₩246,000	1st Han Da-gam (Chiangmai); 2nd Nam Chang-hee (Paris); 3rd Heo Young-ji (Hawaii); 4th Rowoon (Nepal); 5th Key (Gyeongju)	

Episodes	Broadcast Date	Theme	Destination	Trip Designer	Travellers	Trip Name	Budget	Winner	Notes
131	2 March 2019	Seol Min-seok's 3-Part History Tour (To commemorate 100th anniversary of the March 1st Movement and establishment of Provisional Government of the Republic of Korea)	Seoul	Seol Min-seok	Christian Burgos & Han Hyun-min	Seoul Subway History Trip	—	—	
132	9 March 2019	Seol Min-seok's 3-Part History Tour (To commemorate 100th anniversary of the March 1st Movement and establishment of Provisional Government of the Republic of Korea)	Busan	Seol Min-seok	Jung Si-ah & Oh Seung-eun	Busan History Trip	—	—	
Episodes	Broadcast Date	Theme	Destination	Trip Planner(s)		Trip Name	Budget	Winner	Notes
133	16 March 2019	The World is Your School	Zhangjiajie (Hunan, China)	Cao Lu & Lee Hye-jung (Big Mama)		Jiajie Big Cao Tour	₩254,000	Zhangjiajie Team	
134	23 March 2019	The World is Your School	Siem Reap (Cambodia)	Kim Tae-hoon & Yang Jae-woong		Tomb Raiders Tour	₩528,000	Zhangjiajie Team	
135	30 March 2019	Spring Trip Special	Da Nang (Vietnam)	Kim Seung-soo & Kang Kyung-joon		A Nang Ne Tour	₩356,000	Da Nang Team	
136	6 April 2019	Spring Trip Special	Taipei (Taiwan)	Choi Eun-kyung & Ahn Sun-yeong		Highly Satisfaction Tour of Taiwan	₩280,000	Da Nang Team	
Episodes	Broadcast Date	Theme	Destination	Trip Recommended by	Trip Planner(s)	Trip Name	Winner		Notes
137 138	13 April 2019; 20 April 2019	3rd Anniversary Special - Celeb Recommendation Tour	Tongyeong & Geoje (South Gyeongsang)	Lee Hwi-jae, Yang Hee-eun & Lee Hye-jung (Big Mama)	Lee Hwi-jae & Moon Jung-won (Lee Hwi-jae's wife)	Romantic and Relaxing Trip	SNS Voting: 1. Sung Si-kyung (1,286 votes); 2. Lee Hwi-jae (970 votes); 3. Kim Sook (788 votes)		
137 138	13 April 2019; 20 April 2019	3rd Anniversary Special - Celeb Recommendation Tour	Yeosu (South Jeolla Province)	Sung Si-kyung, Mamamoo & Chef Park Chan-il	Sung Si-kyung & Kim Jo-han	Daytime Night-time Eating Trip	SNS Voting: 1. Sung Si-kyung (1,286 votes); 2. Lee Hwi-jae (970 votes); 3. Kim Sook (788 votes)		
137 138	13 April 2019; 20 April 2019	3rd Anniversary Special - Celeb Recommendation Tour	Dangjin (South Chungcheong)	Prof. Yoo Hyun-joo, Han Da-gam & Kim Sook	Kim Sook & Lee Se-young	The Best Photos Friendship Travel	SNS Voting: 1. Sung Si-kyung (1,286 votes); 2. Lee Hwi-jae (970 votes); 3. Kim Sook (788 votes)		
Episodes	Broadcast Date	Theme	Destination	Trip Planner(s)		Trip Name	Budget	Winner	Notes
139	27 April 2019	A Married Couple Trip	Singapore	Do Kyung-wan & Jang Yun-jeong		Wani's Tour	₩780,000	—	
140	4 May 2019	A Married Couple Trip	Macau (China)	Son Jun-ho & Kim So-hyun		Kim Son's Macau Tour	₩1,040,000	—	
141	11 May 2019	Domestic Island Tour – Idol Artists Special	Ganghwa-do (Incheon)	Twice (Dahyun, Chaeyoung & Tzuyu)		Cafeteria Team Spring Tour	₩162,000	Ulleungdo Team	
142	18 May 2019	Domestic Island Tour – Idol Artists Special	Ulleungdo (North Gyeongsang Province)	Norazo (Jo Bin & Won Heum)		Ulleng Island, the Island Where You Live Tour	₩495,000	Ulleungdo Team	
—	No new episode on 25 May 2019 due to 2019 FIFA U-20 World Cup match between Portugal & South Korea								
Episodes	Broadcast Date	Theme	Destination	Trip Designer	Travellers	Trip Name	Budget	Winner	Notes
143	1 June 2019	China vs China	Lijiang (Yunnan, China)	Kang Rae-yeon	Lee Hyun (Homme), Kang Rae-yeon & Kim Ho-young	Introduce Lijiang	₩332,000	Lijiang Team	
144	8 June 2019	China vs China	Tianjin & Beijing (China)	Yang Hong-seok (Pentagon)	Yang Hong-seok, Dindin & Yoo Jae-hwan	Team MKHF	₩357,000	Lijiang Team	
—	No new episode on 15 June 2019 due to 2019 FIFA U-20 World Cup match between Ukraine & South Korea								
Episodes	Broadcast Date	Theme	Destination	Trip Planner(s)		Trip Name	Budget	Winner	Notes
145	22 June 2019	Overseas Summer Vacation Special	Palau	Go Ah-sung & Ryu Hyun-kyung		Palau Me Tour	₩548,000	Yogyakarta Team	
146	29 June 2019	Overseas Summer Vacation Special	Yogyakarta (Indonesia)	Seventeen (S.Coups, Jeonghan & Wonwoo)		Yo Yo Yo Tour	₩238,000	Yogyakarta Team	
147	6 July 2019	Korea Summer Vacation	Goseong (Gangwon Province)	WJSN (Bona & Dayoung)		Goseong, Nice to Meet You Tour	₩206,000	Goseong Team	
148	13 July 2019	Korea Summer Vacation	Buan & Gochang (North Jeolla Province)	Kim Won-jun & Hong Kyung-min		Dad, Go Tour	₩632,000	Goseong Team	
149	20 July 2019	Opposite Extremes of Asian Countries	Boracay (Philippines)	Jin Jung-sun & Song Hae-na		Should We Go to Boracay Tour	₩794,000	Kazakhstan Team	
150	27 July 2019	Opposite Extremes of Asian Countries	Almaty (Kazakhstan)	Seo Do-young & Lee Jae-hwang		Off to Kazakhstan Tour	₩373,000	Kazakhstan Team	
151	3 August 2019	Domestic Summer Vacation Spot Special	Jeju Island	Yoo Hye-ri & Choi Su-rin		Two People Should Come, Jeju Island Healing Tour	₩333,000	Jeju Island Team	
152	10 August 2019	Domestic Summer Vacation Spot Special	Busan	NCT (Jaemin & Jeno)		Dream Tour Show Busan	₩372,000	Jeju Island Team	
153	17 August 2019	Hip People Summer Festival	Pocheon, Gapyeong, Hanam, Namyangju, Yongin & Siheung (Gyeonggi Province)	Yoo Min-sang, Seo Tae-hoon & Lee Se-jin		—	—	—	
154	24 August 2019	A Destination to Zone Out	Ulaanbaatar (Mongolia)	Kangnam (M.I.B) & Choi Jung-won (UN)		Zone Out in Mongolia Tour	₩359,000	—	
155	31 August 2019	A Destination to Zone Out	Taichung (Taiwan)	Kim Ji-min & Hong Hyun-hee		Tour with Zoned-Out Comediennes	₩290,000	—	
156	7 September 2019	South Jeolla Province Trip	Damyang, Muan, Hampyeong, and Yeonggwang (South Jeolla Province)	Boom		Boomtivity Tour	—	—	
156	7 September 2019	South Jeolla Province Trip	Damyang, Muan, Hampyeong, and Yeonggwang (South Jeolla Province)	Kim Hwan		Endless Glorious Tour	—	—	
—	No new episode on 14 September 2019 due to Chuseok Drama Special telecast								
157	21 September 2019	Trip to China for Kids These Days	Kunming (Yunnan, China)	Cao Lu & Kim Min-kyu		Charming Kunming Tour	₩432,000	Guangzhou Team	
158	28 September 2019	Trip to China for Kids These Days	Guangzhou (China)	Chungha & Zhou Jieqiong		Clean Tour in Guangzhou	₩207,000	Guangzhou Team	

===== New program concept =====
- New presentation concept after the program is being revamped.

Episodes	Broadcast Date	Destination	Trip Planner(s)	Trip Name	Budget	Notes
159	5 October 2019	Palawan (Philippines)	Park Yeon-su & Song Ji-a	El Nido Island Hopping Tour	₩321,000	
160	12 October 2019	Palawan (Philippines)	Go Joo-won & Kim Da-hyun	Loyalty Tour to Palawan	₩759,000	
161	19 October 2019	Macau (China)	Lee Hyun-yi, Hong Yun-seo & Park Ga-won, Kang Yu-jun	A Trip With Children	—	
162	26 October 2019	Hoi An & Da Nang (Vietnam)	Don Spike & Shin Bong-hee (Don Spike's mother)	Don't Worry, be Happy Tour	—	
163	2 November 2019	Jirisan (South Gyeongsang)	Lee Seung-yoon & Park Sung-kwang	Mount Jiri Autumn Trip	—	
164	9 November 2019	Hallasan (Jeju Island)	NRG (Chun Myung-hoon & Noh Yoo-min) & Dayoung (WJSN)	Knows Everything Tour	—	
165 166 167 (Part 1)	16 November 2019; 23 November 2019; 30 November 2019	Baku (Azerbaijan)	Kim Sook & Song Eun-i (Celeb Five)	MC Sook's Filial Trip	₩493,000	
165 166 167 (Part 1)	16 November 2019; 23 November 2019; 30 November 2019	Croatia	Apink (Yoon Bo-mi & Park Cho-rong)	Best Friend Tour	₩510,000	
167 (Part 2)	30 November 2019	Lisbon (Portugal)	Lee Seol & Lee El	—	₩513,000	
168	6 December 2019	Lisbon (Portugal)	Lee Seol & Lee El	—	₩513,000	
169	13 December 2019	Melbourne (Australia)	Hwang Chi-yeul & Han Bo-reum	Intense Trip in Melbourne	—	
170	20 December 2019	Melbourne (Australia)	Hwang Chi-yeul & Han Bo-reum	Intense Trip in Melbourne	—	
—	No new episode on 27 December 2019 due to 2019 KBS Song Festival live telecast					

==== 2020 ====
List of Episodes (episode 171 – 177) + 4 special episodes

Episodes	Broadcast Date	Destination	Trip Planner(s)	Trip Name	Budget	Notes
171	3 January 2020	Ulsan & Busan	SF9 (Lee Da-won, Kang Chan-hee & Kim In-seong)	2020 Back to Basics with SF9	—	
172 173	10 January 2020; 17 January 2020	Hualien & Yilan (Taiwan)	Lee Chae-young & Lee Young-eun	Women's Team	₩227,000	
172 173	10 January 2020; 17 January 2020	Hualien & Taitung (Taiwan)	Kim San-ho & Kim Sa-kwon	Men's Team	₩272,000	
—	No new episode on 24 January 2020 due to Lunar New Year Eve TV Special.					
174	31 January 2020	Goryeong (North Gyeongsang) & Daegu	Lovelyz (Jisoo, Kei, Ryu Su-jeong)	Lovelyz's 5K Tour	₩185,000	
—	No new episode on 7 and 14 February 2020.					
175	21 February 2020	Mokpo (South Jeolla Province)	Wink (Kang Joo-hee & Kang Seung-hee), Kim Na-hee & Park Seo-jin	Following the Taste & Style Tour of Travelling Trot Singers	—	
176	28 February 2020	Bogor (Indonesia)	The Boyz (Ju Haknyeon & Hyunjae)	—	₩255,000	
Specials	No new episodes were broadcast between 6 and 27 March 2020 due to travel restriction (covid-19 pandemic). 6 March 2020, repeat telecast of episode 156. 13 March 2020, repeat telecast of episode 142. 20 March 2020, repeat telecast of episode 109, 151 & 164 (Jeju Travel Special Food Collection). 27 March 2020, repeat telecast of episode 147 (Gangwon-do Travel Meal Special).					
177	3 April 2020	Jeonju & Jeongeup (North Jeolla Province)	g.o.d (Danny Ahn, Son Ho-young)	—	—	

=== Season 2 ===
Year	Number of Episodes	Broadcast Date	
Year	Number of Episodes	First aired	Last aired
2022	9	15 October 2022	17 December 2022
2023	30	7 January 2023	12 August 2023
Total	39		

==== 2022 ====
List of Episodes (episode 1 – 9)

Episodes	Broadcast Date	Theme	Destination	Trip Planner(s)	Tour/Team Name	Budget	Winner	Notes
1	15 October 2022	Most Popular Post-COVID-19 Travel Destination	Da Nang & Hội An (Vietnam)	Aiki (Hook) & Gabee (LACHICA)	Akabi Tour	₩847,000	Akabi Tour	
2	22 October 2022	Most Popular Post-COVID-19 Travel Destination	Bangkok & Pattaya (Thailand)	Yerin & Kim Hee-jung	Rinjung Tour	₩479,000	Akabi Tour	
3	29 October 2022	A Day Trip to Gangwon Province that Feels Like a Month	Goseong (Gangwon Province)	Oh My Girl (YooA & Yubin)	Two Yoo Tour	₩363,000	Two Yoo Tour	
4	5 November 2022	A Day Trip to Gangwon Province that Feels Like a Month	Yanggu (Gangwon Province)	AB6IX (Jeon Woong & Kim Dong-hyun)	Woong-Dong Tour	₩288,000	Two Yoo Tour	
5	12 November 2022	Hidden Travel Destination in Gangwon Province	Cheorwon (Gangwon Province)	Kim Jin-woo & Choi Young-jae	Team Strong Men in Their 40s	—	Team Cheorwon	
6	19 November 2022	Hidden Travel Destination in Gangwon Province	Hwacheon (Gangwon Province)	Lee Dong-gook, Kim Ho-joong & Jung Ho-young	Team Ho-Ho-Lee	—	Team Cheorwon	
7	26 November 2022	Hidden Travel Destination in Gangwon Province	Inje (Gangwon Province)	Highlight (Yoon Doo-joon & Son Dong-woon)	Team Du-Dong	—	Team Cheorwon	
–	No new episode on 3 December 2022 due to 2022 FIFA World Cup live telecast.							
8	10 December 2022	Switzerland with Untouched Nature	Saas-Fee & Zermatt (Valais, Switzerland)	Yoo Se-yoon & Song Jin-woo	Gentleman in Switzerland	₩1,740,000	Restbre Tour	
9	17 December 2022	Switzerland with Untouched Nature	Leukerbad & Riederalp (Valais, Switzerland)	Kim Jung-hwan & Gu Bon-gil	Restbre Tour	₩1,510,000	Restbre Tour	
–	No new episode on 24 & 31 December 2022 due to 2022 KBS Entertainment Awards & 2022 KBS Drama Awards live telecast.							

==== 2023 ====
List of Episodes (episode 10 – 39)

Episodes	Broadcast Date	Theme	Destination	Trip Planner(s)	Tour/Team Name	Budget	Winner	Notes
10	7 January 2023	The Summer in the Midwinter, Conquer Your Bucket List	Dubai & Abu Dhabi (UAE)	Kim Yong-jun (SG Wannabe) & Heo Kyung-hwan	Heo-Jun Tour	₩1,281,000	Byulnalar Tour	
11	14 January 2023	The Summer in the Midwinter, Conquer Your Bucket List	Dubai & Abu Dhabi (UAE)	Mamamoo (Moonbyul & Solar)	Byulnalar Tour	₩1,721,000	Byulnalar Tour	
–	No new episode on 21 January 2023 due to 2023 KBS Lunar New Year Special Peregrine Falcon Concert.							
12	28 January 2023	They will Become Popular in 2023! Hidden Spots in Southeast Asia	Johor Bahru (Malaysia)	Ryu Seung-soo & Kim Ho-young	Heart Rate Raising Tour	₩489,000	Shooting Bali Tour	
13	4 February 2023	They will Become Popular in 2023! Hidden Spots in Southeast Asia	Bali (Indonesia)	Song Hae-na & Yubin	Shooting Bali Tour	₩698,000	Shooting Bali Tour	
14	11 February 2023	Domestic Hot Spring Travel	Mungyeong (North Gyeongsang)	Ji Sang-ryeol & KCM	Slowly with Alcohol Tour	—	Slowly with Alcohol Tour	
15	18 February 2023	Domestic Hot Spring Travel	Seongju (North Gyeongsang)	Kim Ji-min & Hwang Bo-ra	Scrub & Shine Tour	—	Slowly with Alcohol Tour	
16	25 February 2023	Battle Trip's Married Couple Special: Second Honeymoon	Cebu (Philippines)	In Gyo-jin & So Yi-hyun	Friendship Tour	₩1,774,000	Friendship Tour	
17	4 March 2023	Battle Trip's Married Couple Special: Second Honeymoon	Phuket (Thailand)	Park Sung-kwang & Lee Sol-yi	Better Half Tour	₩906,000	Friendship Tour	
18 19 20	11 March 2023; 18 March 2023; 25 March 2023	Trip to Southeast Asia with ₩500,000 for 2 people	Laos	Kim Yong-myeong & Kim Hae-jun	Yong-Hae's Tear Tour	₩343,000	Let Loose Tour	
18 19 20	11 March 2023; 18 March 2023; 25 March 2023	Trip to Southeast Asia with ₩500,000 for 2 people	Da Lat, (Lâm Đồng, Vietnam)	Shin Bong-sun & Hanhae	Let Loose Tour	₩452,000	Let Loose Tour	
21 22	1 April 2023; 8 April 2023	Food Destruction List! Nearby Destinations with Great Food (Part 1)	Taipei (Taiwan)	Hong Yun-hwa & Lee Hye-jung	Taiwan, How Delicious it is Tour	—	Team Taiwan	
21 22	1 April 2023; 8 April 2023	Food Destruction List! Nearby Destinations with Great Food (Part 1)	Kyoto & Osaka (Japan)	KARA (Kang Ji-young & Heo Young-ji)	Eating Confidently Everywhere Tour	—	Team Taiwan	
23 24	15 April 2023; 22 April 2023	MZ School Trip	Busan	Yoojung (Weki Meki), Ju Haknyeon (The Boyz), WEi (Yohan & Yongha), Dayoung (WJSN) & Arin (Oh My Girl)	99s' Tour	—	—	
25	29 April 2023	Food Destruction List! Nearby Destinations with Great Food (Part 2)	Sapporo (Japan)	Tei & Jung Dong-ha	Balladream Tour	—	Team Hong Kong	
26	6 May 2023	Food Destruction List! Nearby Destinations with Great Food (Part 2)	Hong Kong	Jeong Jun-ha & Heebab	Will You Give Us Food Tour	—	Team Hong Kong	
27 28	13 May 2023; 20 May 2023	Novel Destinations Where You Can Just Pack and Go	Sri Lanka	Kim Won-hoon, Um Ji-yoon & Cho Jin-se	Shortbox Sri Lanka Tour	—	Um Ji-yoon selected the best travelling companion	
29	27 May 2023	A Budget-friendly Trip to Europe	Porto (Portugal)	Hong Seok-cheon & Joo Ho-min	Hairless Brothers Tour	₩460,500	Hairless Brothers Tour	
30	3 June 2023	A Budget-friendly Trip to Europe	Prague (Czech Republic)	Yoo Se-yoon & Song Jin-woo	Gentleman in Prague	₩830,000	Hairless Brothers Tour	
31	10 June 2023	Travelling to a Small European Town	Český Krumlov (Czech Republic)	Yoo Se-yoon & Song Jin-woo	Gentleman in Prague	—	Hairless Brothers Tour	
31	10 June 2023	Travelling to a Small European Town	Aveiro (Portugal)	Hong Seok-cheon & Joo Ho-min	Hairless Brothers Tour	—	Hairless Brothers Tour	
32 33	17 June 2023; 24 June 2023	Level Up! Trip to Thailand – Showdown with Locals	Chiang Mai & Chiang Rai (Thailand)	BamBam (Got7) & Jeong Yein (Lovelyz)	BBAAM Tour	₩537,000	Nichname Tour	
32 33	17 June 2023; 24 June 2023	Level Up! Trip to Thailand – Showdown with Locals	Bangkok & Kanchanaburi (Thailand)	Nichkhun (2PM) & Baekho	Nichname Tour	₩366,000	Nichname Tour	
34	1 July 2023	Domestic Trip Rivalry!	Pohang (North Gyeongsang)	Kwon Il-yong & Pyo Chang-won	Fantastic Combo Tour	—	Cho Twins Tour	
35	8 July 2023	Domestic Trip Rivalry!	Jecheon (North Chungcheong)	Cho Jun-ho & Cho Jun-hyun	Cho Twins Tour	—	Cho Twins Tour	
–	No new episode on 15 July 2023 due to the coverage of the 2023 South Korea floods.							
36	22 July 2023	Hot Summer – Recommended Travel Destinations for Summer Vacation	Hanoi & Hạ Long Bay (Vietnam)	Kim Min-seok (MeloMance) & Park Jae-min	Ear and Nose Slamming Tour	₩391,000	Team Kota Kinabalu	
37	29 July 2023	Hot Summer – Recommended Travel Destinations for Summer Vacation	Kota Kinabalu (Malaysia)	Hwang Soo-kyung & Park Seul-gi	Wise Liberation Notes Tour	₩668,000	Team Kota Kinabalu	
38 39	5 August 2023; 12 August 2023	Battle Trip 2, Host Special in Taiwan	Taiwan	Sung Si-kyung, Lee Yong-jin, Heo Kyung-hwan, Lee Mi-joo (Lovelyz) & Aiki (Hook)	MC Special Graduation Tour Team Leader Confrontation!	—	Heo Kyung-hwan	

== Top 10 destinations as chosen by audience votes (Season 1, Episode 1 to 158) ==
Below is the list of destinations chosen by audiences' votes. Episodes with exceptions are not included in the list.

Ranking	Destination	Episode	Trip Planners / Travellers	Votes
1	Da Nang (Vietnam)	56 – 57	Oh Hyun-kyung & Jung Si-ah	99
2	Czech Republic	29 – 30	Lee Kyu-han & Kim Ki-bang	97
3	Jeolla Province	23 – 24	Kim Sook & Park So-hyun	94
4	Busan	21	Seo Kyung-duk & Yoo Jae-hwan	93
5	Seoul	1	Doojoon (Highlight) & Seol Min-seok	92
5	Dubai (UAE)	27 – 28	Seo Hyo-rim & Lee Chung-ah	92
5	Shanghai (China)	39	Seo Kyung-duk, Yoo Jae-hwan & DinDin	92
5	Da Nang (Vietnam)	135 – 136	Kim Seung-soo & Kang Kyung-joon	92
9	Hanoi (Vietnam)	85 – 86	Yeom Gyeong-hwan, Choi Eun-kyung & Ahn Sun-yeong	91
9	Pai & Chiang Mai (Thailand)	91 – 93	VIXX (Hongbin & N)	91

== Ratings ==
- In the ratings below, N/R means no record or not reported, the highest rating for the show will be in red and the lowest rating for the show will be in blue each year.

=== Season 1 ===
- From 8 September 2018 onward, the show will be aired in two parts. Only the higher rating of the episode will be shown.
List of ratings (Season 1)

2016

List of ratings (episode 1 – 32)

Episode	Broadcast Date	AGB Nielsen (Nationwide)
1	16 April	4.5%
2	23 April	4.5%
3	30 April	3.6%
4	7 May	3.3%
5	14 May	3.1%
6	21 May	3.0%
7	28 May	4.6%
8	4 June	5.2%
9	11 June	5.2%
10	18 June	4.7%
11	25 June	4.8%
12	2 July	4.3%
13	9 July	4.4%
14	16 July	4.9%
15	23 July	4.9%
16	30 July	4.7%

Episode	Broadcast Date	AGB Nielsen (Nationwide)
17	27 August	5.4%
18	3 September	4.5%
19	10 September	5.1%
20	24 September	5.4%
21	1 October	4.3%
22	8 October	4.4%
23	15 October	5.5%
24	22 October	4.5%
25	29 October	4.4%
26	5 November	4.2%
27	12 November	4.1%
28	19 November	3.2%
29	26 November	4.5%
30	3 December	4.7%
31	10 December	4.5%
32	17 December	5.3%

2017

List of ratings (episode 33 – 74)

Episode	Broadcast Date	AGB Nielsen (Nationwide)
33	7 January	4.7%
34	14 January	5.7%
35	21 January	5.4%
36	4 February	5.0%
37	11 February	6.3%
38	18 February	4.2%
39	25 February	4.1%
40	4 March	4.6%
41	11 March	4.4%
42	18 March	5.4%
43	25 March	4.1%
44	1 April	4.9%
45	8 April	4.0%
46	15 April	4.7%

Episode	Broadcast Date	AGB Nielsen (Nationwide)
47	22 April	5.4%
48	29 April	4.6%
49	6 May	4.0%
50	13 May	5.6%
51	20 May	4.9%
52	27 May	4.6%
53	3 June	4.9%
54	10 June	4.2%
55	17 June	4.8%
56	24 June	4.4%
57	1 July	5.2%
58	8 July	3.3%
59	15 July	4.5%
60	22 July	4.5%

Episode	Broadcast Date	AGB Nielsen (Nationwide)
61	29 July	3.5%
62	5 August	4.3%
63	12 August	3.8%
64	19 August	3.7%
65	26 August	4.8%
66	2 September	4.3%
67	9 September	3.4%
68	16 September	3.8%
69	23 September	4.1%
70	30 September	3.4%
71	7 October	3.3%
72	14 October	3.6%
73	21 October	4.7%
74	2 December	4.6%

2018

List of ratings (episode 75 – 122)

Episode	Broadcast Date	AGB Nielsen (Nationwide)
75	6 January	3.3%
76	13 January	5.5%
77	20 January	3.6%
78	3 February	3.7%
79	17 February	3.0%
80	23 February	3.3%
81	3 March	3.7%
82	10 March	3.6%
83	17 March	5.6%
84	24 March	4.6%
85	31 March	6.4%
86	7 April	4.2%
87	14 April	4.0%
88	21 April	3.8%
89	28 April	2.9%
90	5 May	2.9%

Episode	Broadcast Date	AGB Nielsen (Nationwide)
91	12 May	4.8%
92	19 May	3.5%
93	26 May	3.3%
94	2 June	4.8%
95	9 June	4.0%
96	16 June	6.0%
97	30 June	4.2%
98	7 July	4.2%
99	14 July	4.1%
100	21 July	4.7%
101	28 July	3.6%
102	4 August	2.9%
103	11 August	3.7%
104	18 August	4.2%
105	25 August	4.2%
106	1 September	4.1%

Episode	Broadcast Date	AGB Nielsen (Nationwide)
107	8 September	3.5%
108	15 September	3.2%
109	22 September	3.7%
110	29 September	4.7%
111	6 October	3.1%
112	13 October	3.8%
113	20 October	3.6%
114	27 October	3.2%
115	3 November	3.3%
116	10 November	3.5%
117	17 November	3.8%
118	24 November	3.5%
119	1 December	3.0%
120	8 December	4.4%
121	15 December	3.0%
122	29 December	3.0%

2019

List of ratings (episode 123 – 170)

Episode	Broadcast Date	AGB Nielsen (Nationwide)
123	5 January	4.4%
124	12 January	4.1%
125	19 January	3.1%
126	26 January	3.0%
127	2 February	3.7%
128	9 February	3.3%
129	16 February	2.1%
130	23 February	3.2%
131	2 March	3.4%
132	9 March	3.4%
133	16 March	5.3%
134	23 March	3.8%
135	30 March	4.7%
136	6 April	4.5%
137	13 April	3.6%
138	20 April	3.7%

Episode	Broadcast Date	AGB Nielsen (Nationwide)
139	27 April	7.4%
140	4 May	5.6%
141	11 May	3.4%
142	18 May	4.4%
143	1 June	4.1%
144	8 June	4.2%
145	22 June	4.2%
146	29 June	3.4%
147	6 July	3.9%
148	13 July	3.7%
149	20 July	3.2%
150	27 July	4.3%
151	3 August	3.9%
152	10 August	3.0%
153	17 August	3.0%
154	24 August	3.5%

Episode	Broadcast Date	AGB Nielsen (Nationwide)
155	31 August	3.4%
156	7 September	3.1%
157	21 September	2.6%
158	28 September	2.9%
159	5 October	2.9%
160	12 October	3.2%
161	19 October	3.4%
162	26 October	3.5%
163	2 November	3.0%
164	9 November	3.1%
165	16 November	4.1%
166	23 November	3.3%
167	30 November	3.0%
168	6 December	2.9%
169	13 December	2.9%
170	20 December	2.7%

2020

List of ratings (episode 171 – 177)

Episode	Broadcast Date	AGB Nielsen (Nationwide)
171	3 January	2.2%
172	10 January	2.9%
173	17 January	2.9%
174	31 January	1.8%

Episode	Broadcast Date	AGB Nielsen (Nationwide)
175	21 February	1.9%
176	28 February	1.8%
177	3 April	2.4%

=== Season 2 ===
2022

List of ratings (episode 1 - 9)

Episode	Broadcast Date	AGB Nielsen (Nationwide)
1	15 October	2.2%
2	22 October	2.3%
3	29 October	1.5%
4	5 November	1.9%
5	12 November	1.4%
6	19 November	1.9%
7	26 November	1.4%
8	10 December	3.5%
9	17 December	1.4%

2023

List of ratings (episode 10 - 39)

Episode	Broadcast Date	AGB Nielsen (Nationwide)
10	7 January	2.0%
11	14 January	2.0%
12	28 January	2.4%
13	4 February	2.2%
14	11 February	1.4%
15	18 February	1.9%
16	25 February	2.3%
17	4 March	1.4%
18	11 March	2.7%
19	18 March	2.3%
20	25 March	2.2%
21	1 April	2.6%
22	8 April	2.5%
23	15 April	1.5%
24	22 April	1.3%

Episode	Broadcast Date	AGB Nielsen (Nationwide)
25	29 April	1.5%
26	6 May	2.1%
27	13 May	1.9%
28	20 May	1.7%
29	27 May	1.5%
30	3 June	1.3%
31	10 June	1.4%
32	17 June	1.5%
33	24 June	1.9%
34	1 July	1.4%
35	8 July	1.4%
36	22 July	2.0%
37	29 July	1.4%
38	5 August	1.7%
39	12 August	2.2%

== Books ==
- 배틀트립 (Battle Trip) (in Korean). 웅진지식하우스 (Woongjin Knowledge House). 27 April 2018. ISBN 9788901223414. Written by KBS Battle Trip Production Team & Woo Ji-kyung

== Awards and nominations ==
Year	Award	Category	Recipients	Result	Ref
2016	15th KBS Entertainment Awards	Top Excellence Award – Talk Show (Female)	Kim Sook	Won	
2016	15th KBS Entertainment Awards	Rookie Award – Talk Show (Male)	San E	Nominated	
2018	16th KBS Entertainment Awards	Top Excellence Award – Talk Show (Female)	Kim Sook	Won	
2018	16th KBS Entertainment Awards	Excellence Award – Talk Show (Male)	Sung Si-kyung	Won	
2019	17th KBS Entertainment Awards	Grand Prize (Daesang)	Kim Sook	Nominated	
2019	17th KBS Entertainment Awards	Top Excellence Award in Entertainment	Kim Jun-hyun	Nominated	
2019	17th KBS Entertainment Awards	Rookie Award in Entertainment	Yoon Bo-mi	Nominated	
2022	20th KBS Entertainment Awards	Rookie Award in Reality Category	Lee Mijoo	Nominated	
