= Nobody Knows (1970 film) =

- Hangul: 아무도 모르게
- RR: Amudo moreuge
- MR: Amudo morŭge
- Directed by: Jang Il-ho
- Written by: Kim Ha-lim
- Produced by: Kwak Jeong-hwan
- Starring: Oh Yu-kyeong; Noh Joo-hyun; Choi In-suk
- Cinematography: Lee Mun-baek
- Edited by: Kim Hui-su
- Music by: Park Chun-seok
- Distributed by: Hapdong Film Co.
- Release date: February 6, 1970
- Running time: 85 minutes
- Country: South Korea
- Language: Korean

Nobody Knows (Korean: 아무도 모르게) is a 1970 South Korean drama film directed by Jang Il-ho.

== Plot ==
Jeong-ah, who grew up at an orphanage, works as a maid, and is raped by Yeong, the son of her employer. Yeong was engaged to Hyeon-ju, but dislikes her and decides to marry Jeong-ah instead. He takes Jeong-ah to a church and celebrates their own wedding by themselves. Yeong's parents and relatives learn of the fact and go late to the church to celebrate with the new couple.

== Cast ==
- Oh Yu-kyeong ... Jeong-ah
- Roh Joo-hyun ... Yeong
- Choi In-suk ... Hyeon-ju
- Lee Nak-hoon
- Jung Hye-sun
- Choi Bool-am
- Lee Muk-won
- Choe Eun-jeong
- Gwon O-sang
- Yoon Il-ju
