= Creating Destiny =

- Promotional poster
- Also known as: Seeking Love; Making Fate
- Genre: Romance; Comedy
- Written by: Hyun Go-woon
- Directed by: Jang Geun-soo; Lee Sung-joon
- Starring: Eugene; Ki Tae-young
- Country of origin: South Korea
- Original language: Korean
- No. of episodes: 31

Production
- Executive producer: Oh Hyun-chang
- Production locations: South Korea; Australia
- Running time: 70 minutes
- Production company: Olive 9

Original release
- Network: Munhwa Broadcasting Corporation
- Release: October 10, 2009 – January 24, 2010

Creating Destiny (Korean: 인연 만들기; RR: Inyeon mandeulgi; lit. Creating Relations) is a 2009 South Korean romantic comedy television series based on the two-volume manhwa of the same title written by Choi Soo-jung and Hyun Go-woon. It aired on MBC from October 10, 2009 to January 24, 2010 on Saturdays and Sundays at 19:55 for 31 episodes.

Lead actors Eugene and Ki Tae-young fell in love while filming and married in 2011. When Eugene announced their engagement in a posting on her official fan site, she wrote, "The drama Creating Destiny actually created my beloved destiny."

== Plot ==
Han Sang-eun immigrated to Australia with her family at a young age. After graduating from law school, she announces her plans to marry her American boyfriend Alex, a fellow attorney. But her father is strongly opposed to the match, because he has his heart set on her marrying Kim Yeo-joon, the son of his best friend who lives back in Korea. He orders her to meet the bachelor that they picked out for her before she goes ahead and marries Alex. Sang-eun finds herself exiled to Korea, where she reluctantly teams up with Yeo-joon, who is focused on his career and equally uninterested in marriage, to devise a plan that will allow them to avoid their impending wedlock.

== Cast ==
=== Main characters ===
- Eugene as Han Sang-eun
- Ki Tae-young as Kim Yeo-joon
- Kang Byul as Han Hyo-eun
- Kim Jung-nan as Kim Yoon-hee
- Clara Lee (Note: Credited as Lee Sung-min.) as Yoo Hye-rim
- Jung Suk-won as Jung Gyu-hwan
- Byun Woo-min as Kang Hae-sung
- Ryu Sang-wook as Kang Se-won

=== Supporting characters ===
Han family

- Kang Nam-gil as Han Kyung-tae
- Im Hyun-sik as Yoon Seok-joo

Kim family

- Hwang Eun-hye as Kim Jin-joo
- Choi Sang-hoon as Kim Taek-soo
- Yang Hee-kyung as Park Geum-ja
- Ban Hyo-jung as Lee Ok-ran
- Lee Jung-hoon as Park Bok-man

Shim family

- Lee Hee-do as Shim Dae-hwan
- Geum Bo-ra as Shin Jin-hee

Extended cast

- Baek Jong-min as Min Chul-ho
- Olivier as Alex
- Park Soon-chun as Soo-jung
- Yoon Joo-hee as Jung Seo-yeon

== Awards ==
- 2009 MBC Drama Awards: Golden Acting Award, Veteran Actor - Kang Nam-gil
