= Ki Tae-young =

South Korean actor (born 1978)

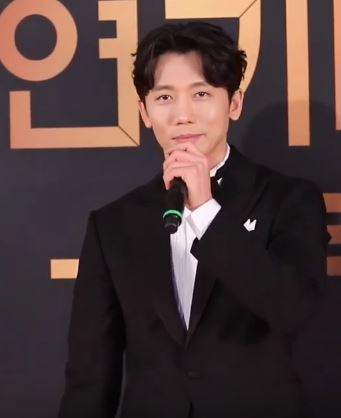
- Ki in 2019
- Born: Kim Yong-woo; December 9, 1978 (age 47); Seoul, South Korea
- Education: Daejin University – Theater and Film
- Occupation: Actor
- Years active: 1997–present
- Agent: J-Stars Entertainment
- Spouse: Eugene (m. 2011)
- Children: 2

Korean name
- Hangul: 김용우
- Hanja: 金容佑
- RR: Gim Yongu
- MR: Kim Yongu

Stage name
- Hangul: 기태영
- Hanja: 奇太映
- RR: Gi Taeyeong
- MR: Ki T'aeyŏng

Ki Tae-young (Korean: 기태영; born Kim Yong-woo on December 9, 1978) is a South Korean actor. Ki made his acting debut in 1997, and went on to play leading roles in the television dramas Creating Destiny (2009), Living in Style (2011), and Make Your Wish (2014). He is loved by viewers for starring on KBS 2 Superman Returns on January 24, 2016. He also released an EP in 2012. He married his Creating Destiny co-star Eugene on July 23, 2011.

== Filmography ==
=== Television series ===
Year	Title	Role
1997	New Generation Report: Adults Just Don't Know	
1998	Vectorman: Warriors of the Earth	Vectorman Eagle
1999	School 2	Yoo Shin-hwa
2000	KAIST	Ki Tae-hoon
2001	I Still Love You	
2005	HDTV Literature "The Outdoor Lamp"	Seo Young-woo
2006	MBC Best Theater "Tongjeong"	Eunuch Ji-gyeom
2007	Behind the White Tower	Yeom Dong-il
2008	Mom's Dead Upset	Kim Jung-hyun
2008	Terroir	Joey Park
2008	Star's Lover	Son Ha-young
2008	Dad's Dead Upset	Kim Jung-hyun
2009	Creating Destiny	Lee Se-yoon
2010	Jejungwon	Jwauijeong's son (cameo, episode 22)
2010	MBC Best Theater "We Teach Love"	Kwon Tae-joon
2011	Royal Family	Kang Choong-ki
2011	Living in Style	Choi Shin-hyung
2012	To the Beautiful You	Jang Min-woo
2012	Drama Special "Mellow in May"	Park Dong-hoon
2013	Case Number 113	Jang Joon-seok
2013	The Scandal	Jang Eun-joong/ Geum Man-bok/ Gu Jae-in
2013	Drama Special "Neighborhood Watch"	Kang Hoe-chan
2014	Make Your Wish	Kang Jin-hee
2015	The Virtual Bride	Kang Joon-soo
2019	Mother of Mine	Kim Woo-jin
2022	Trolley	Choi Ki-young

=== Film ===
Year	Title	Role	Notes/Ref.
2011	A Reason to Live	Sang-woo	
2012	In Between	He	segment: "A Time to Leave"
2015	Han River	Kang Myung-joon	

=== Variety show ===
Year	Title	Notes/Ref.
2012	Super Couple Diary	
2016-2018	The Return of Superman	Ep 114–210
2021–present	Stars' Top Recipe at Fun-Staurant	Ep 76–present

== Discography ==
Album information	Track listing
행복한 사람 (Happy Person): Single; Released: April 16, 2012; Label: SP&J Entertainment, Sony Music	Track listing: 1. 행복한 사람 (Happy Person); 2. 행복한 사람 (Happy Person) (feat. J-Hwan)
Cherish: EP; Released: April 23, 2012; Label: SP&J Entertainment, Sony Music	Track listing: 1. 그대뿐이죠 (Only You); 2. 행복한 사람 (Happy Person); 3. 오 나의 요정 (Oh My Fairy); 4. 행복한 사람 (Happy Person) (feat. J-Hwan); 5. 그대뿐이죠 (Only You) (Inst.)
오 나의 요정 (Oh My Fairy): Single; Released: July 23, 2012; Label: SP&J Entertainment, Sony Music	Track listing: 1. 오 나의 요정 (Oh My Fairy) (feat. Tommy)

== Awards and nominations ==
Year	Award	Category	Nominated work	Result
2008	KBS Drama Awards	Best New Actor	Mom's Dead Upset	Nominated
2014	MBC Drama Awards	Excellence Award, Actor in a Serial Drama	Make Your Wish	Nominated
2016	15th KBS Entertainment Awards	Excellence Award, Variety	The Return of Superman	Won
2019	29th KBS Drama Awards	Excellence Award, Actor in a Serial Drama	Mother of Mine	Won
2021	19th KBS Entertainment Awards	Excellence Award in Reality Category	Stars' Top Recipe at Fun-Staurant	Nominated
