= Mother of Mine (TV series) =

2019 South Korean television series

- Promotional poster
- Hangul: 세상에서 제일 예쁜 내 딸
- Lit.: My Daughter Who Is the Prettiest in the World
- RR: Sesangeseo jeil yeppeun nae ttal
- MR: Sesangesŏ cheil yeppŭn nae ttal
- Genre: Family; Romance; Comedy; Melodrama
- Created by: KBS Drama Production
- Written by: Jo Jung-sun
- Directed by: Kim Jong-chang
- Starring: Kim Hae-sook; Kim So-yeon; Yoo Sun; Kim Ha-kyung; Park Geun-soo; Nam Tae-boo; Choi Myung-gil
- Music by: Gaemi (Music Manager)
- Country of origin: South Korea
- Original language: Korean
- No. of episodes: 108 (Note: Originally scheduled to air for 100 episodes, the series was extended by eight episodes due to its popularity.) (Note: In order to circumvent Korean laws that prevent commercial breaks in the middle of an episode, what would previously have been aired as single 70 minute episodes are now being repackaged as two 35 minute episodes, with two episodes being shown each night with a commercial break between the two.)

Production
- Camera setup: Single-camera
- Running time: 35 minutes
- Production companies: GnG Production; Take2

Original release
- Network: KBS2
- Release: March 23 – September 22, 2019

Mother of Mine (Korean: 세상에서 제일 예쁜 내 딸) is a 2019 South Korean television series starring Kim Hae-sook, Kim So-yeon, Kim Ha-kyung, Park Geun-soo, Nam Tae-boo and Choi Myung-gil. The series aired on KBS2 every Saturday and Sunday from 19:55 to 21:15 (KST) from March 23 to September 22, 2019 for 108 episodes.

== Synopsis ==
While running a small beef soup restaurant, Park Seon-ja (Kim Hae-sook) raised her three daughters Kang Mi-seon (Yoo Sun), Kang Mi-ri (Kim So-yeon) and Kang Mi-hye (Kim Ha-kyung) alone. She still runs the restaurant to this day and her three daughters are now all grown up. Seon-Ja's first daughter Mi-seon is married and she has a daughter. Mi-seon is busy working and taking care of her family. Second daughter Mi-ri cares about her mother a lot. She is confident in herself and good at her job. Mi-ri gets involved in a romantic relationship with her co-worker Han Tae-joo (Hong Jong-hyun). He is the oldest son of the family that owns the company. The youngest daughter is Mi-Hye. She used to be a promising novelist. She helps her mother at the restaurant.

== Cast ==
=== Main ===
- Kim Hae-sook as Park Seon-ja

Mother of Kang Mi-seon, Kang Mi-ri, and Kang Mi-hye. She owns and runs an Ox Bone soup restaurant.

- Choi Myung-gil as Jeon In-sook

Biological mother of Kang Mi-ri and Step-aunt of Han Tae-joo. She is the new CEO of HS Apparel.

- Kim So-yeon as Kang Mi-ri / Kang Seung-yeon

Adopted daughter/Niece of Park Seon-ja and Biological daughter of Jeon In-sook. She works for HS Apparel.

- Yoo Sun as Kang Mi-seon

Park Seon-ja's oldest daughter. She works in a bank.

- Kim Ha-kyung as Kang Mi-hye

Park Seon-ja's youngest daughter. She is a former novelist.

- Park Geun-soo as Park Yeong-dal

Park Seon-ja's younger brother and uncle of Kang Mi-seon, Kang Mi-ri, and Kang Mi-hye. He works in his sister's restaurant.

- Nam Tae-boo as Bang Jae-beom

A successful drama screenwriter and Kang Mi-hye's ex-boyfriend.

- Hong Jong-hyun as Han Tae-joo

Newly recruited employee at HS Apparel and Kang Mi-ri's love interest. He is secretly the oldest son of HS Group's chairman

=== Supporting ===
==== Han Cheon Ox Bone Soup Restaurant ====
- Jo Seung-wook as Min-woo

Part-timer working in the restaurant.

==== HS Group ====
- Dong Bang-woo as Han Jong-soo

Chairman of HS Group. Han Tae-joo and Han Tae-ho's father.

- Kang Sung-yeon as Na Hye-mi

Han Jong-soo's second wife who is a retired actress.

- Choi Jae-won as Na Do-jin

Na Hye-mi's older brother.

- Lee Ro-woon as Han Tae-ho

Han Jong-soo and Na Hye-mi's son and Han Tae-joo's much younger half-brother.
Kang Moon-kyung as Director Park Director of Hansung Group
Nam June Paik as Nam June Park Insuk's representative secretary

==== Kang Mi-seon's family ====
- Joo Hyun as Jeong Dae-cheol

Kang Mi-seon's father-in-law.

- Park Jung-soo as Ha Mi-ok

Kang Mi-seon's mother-in-law.

- Lee Won-jae as Jeong Jin-soo

Kang Mi-seon's husband and Jang Da-bin's father.

- Joo Ye-rim as Jeong Da-bin

Kang Mi-seon and Jeong Jin-soo's only daughter.

==== Doldamgil Publishing ====
- Ki Tae-young as Kim Woo-jin

Doldamgil Publishing's Chief editor and Kang Mi-hye's love interest.

- Han Ki-woong as Peter Park

Doldamgil Publishing's employee and Kim Woo-jin's old friend.

- Lee Da-hae as Seo Hee-Jin

Kim Woo-jin's ex-wife and a book designer.

==== HS Group Marketing and Strategy Department ====
- Kim Wang-geun as Kim Seung-cheol
- Jo Young-hoon as Park Tae-ho
- Lee Tae-yeon as Lee Min-joo
- Jo Joo-won as Park Ji-soo
- Kim Yeo-jin as Jo Min-hye

==== The Bank ====
- Kim Se-dong as Park Haeng-woon
- Joo In-young as Seo Kyung-jin
- Yang Eo-jin as Park Min-ji
- Yoon Bo-mi as Han Na-young

=== Special appearances ===
- Joo Hyun-mi as Wang Wei
- Han Da-sol as Jeong So-hee
- Lee Sang-woo as Mi-ri's blind date
- Ko Kyu-pil as police officer (ep. #3)
- Lee Hwang-ui as Woo-jin's father
- Lee Mi-young as pharmacist
- Kim Gi-ha as Yeong-dal's friend

== Viewership ==
- In this table, the blue numbers represent the lowest ratings and the red numbers represent the highest ratings.
- N/A denotes that the rating is not known.
- The last episode has more than 6.2 million views.

Ep.	Original broadcast date	Average audience share		
Ep.	Original broadcast date	TNmS	AGB Nielsen	
Ep.	Original broadcast date	Nationwide	Nationwide	Seoul
1	March 23, 2019	23.5%	22.6%	20.9%
2	March 23, 2019	27.0%	26.6%	25.3%
3	March 24, 2019	25.0%	24.0%	22.5%
4	March 24, 2019	29.9%	28.2%	26.2%
5	March 30, 2019	21.5%	22.0%	21.1%
6	March 30, 2019	26.2%	26.6%	25.3%
7	March 31, 2019	25.7%	25.0%	22.9%
8	March 31, 2019	31.0%	29.6%	27.4%
9	April 6, 2019	21.9%	21.9%	21.1%
10	April 6, 2019	26.7%	26.2%	24.4%
11	April 7, 2019	24.5%	24.8%	22.7%
12	April 7, 2019	30.1%	30.1%	28.0%
13	April 13, 2019	20.9%	21.2%	20.0%
14	April 13, 2019	26.2%	26.0%	24.6%
15	April 14, 2019	27.2%	26.2%	24.0%
16	April 14, 2019	31.3%	30.5%	28.9%
17	April 20, 2019	23.3%	22.2%	21.6%
18	April 20, 2019	27.7%	25.2%	24.3%
19	April 21, 2019	26.4%	26.3%	25.1%
20	April 21, 2019	32.4%	32.1%	30.8%
21	April 27, 2019	23.0%	22.9%	21.4%
22	April 27, 2019	28.0%	28.1%	27.2%
23	April 28, 2019	26.6%	25.9%	24.1%
24	April 28, 2019	32.1%	30.8%	28.8%
25	May 4, 2019	20.4%	19.5%	17.7%
26	May 4, 2019	26.0%	24.8%	22.7%
27	May 5, 2019	23.5%	23.4%	22.3%
28	May 5, 2019	30.2%	29.3%	28.2%
29	May 11, 2019	23.9%	22.3%	20.9%
30	May 11, 2019	30.2%	26.9%	25.4%
31	May 12, 2019	26.5%	26.6%	25.2%
32	May 12, 2019	32.9%	32.6%	31.3%
33	May 18, 2019	23.6%	23.0%	21.4%
34	May 18, 2019	28.7%	28.2%	26.5%
35	May 19, 2019	27.4%	27.4%	26.1%
36	May 19, 2019	33.4%	33.1%	32.0%
37	May 25, 2019	21.2%	23.4%	22.2%
38	May 25, 2019	26.8%	28.2%	26.9%
39	May 26, 2019	24.3%	25.9%	24.0%
40	May 26, 2019	32.2%	32.5%	30.2%
41	June 1, 2019	22.6%	22.9%	22.1%
42	June 1, 2019	29.5%	28.5%	27.4%
43	June 2, 2019	26.1%	26.9%	25.8%
44	June 2, 2019	33.3%	33.0%	32.4%
45	June 8, 2019	21.6%	22.1%	21.0%
46	June 8, 2019	27.7%	29.1%	28.4%
47	June 9, 2019	26.5%	26.4%	25.5%
48	June 9, 2019	32.6%	32.1%	30.9%
49	June 15, 2019	22.7%	22.8%	21.1%
50	June 15, 2019	29.1%	28.4%	26.9%
51	June 16, 2019	25.1%	26.7%	26.6%
52	June 16, 2019	31.9%	31.8%	30.5%
53	June 22, 2019	—N/a	22.8%	22.4%
54	June 22, 2019	—N/a	28.7%	27.8%
55	June 23, 2019	24.9%	26.4%	25.8%
56	June 23, 2019	32.6%	33.6%	32.5%
57	June 29, 2019	24.0%	24.6%	21.7%
58	June 29, 2019	29.4%	30.5%	27.8%
59	June 30, 2019	25.0%	26.4%	25.2%
60	June 30, 2019	31.6%	32.7%	31.0%
61	July 6, 2019	20.7%	23.1%	21.8%
62	July 6, 2019	27.1%	28.4%	26.9%
63	July 7, 2019	24.4%	26.8%	25.5%
64	July 7, 2019	28.4%	31.3%	30.6%
65	July 13, 2019	21.3%	22.3%	21.3%
66	July 13, 2019	25.8%	26.9%	24.9%
67	July 14, 2019	24.1%	25.7%	24.6%
68	July 14, 2019	29.9%	30.4%	29.6%
69	July 20, 2019	23.3%	25.0%	23.2%
70	July 20, 2019	27.5%	29.5%	27.4%
71	July 21, 2019	24.7%	26.8%	25.7%
72	July 21, 2019	30.4%	32.6%	31.2%
73	July 27, 2019	22.1%	24.2%	23.0%
74	July 27, 2019	27.7%	29.5%	28.0%
75	July 28, 2019	—N/a	26.9%	25.6%
76	July 28, 2019	32.1%	31.6%	30.3%
77	August 3, 2019	—N/a	21.5%	20.0%
78	August 3, 2019	—N/a	27.3%	25.5%
79	August 4, 2019	26.0%	26.1%	24.8%
80	August 4, 2019	31.1%	31.1%	28.8%
81	August 10, 2019	21.0%	21.8%	20.4%
82	August 10, 2019	26.3%	27.7%	26.6%
83	August 11, 2019	26.0%	26.9%	25.5%
84	August 11, 2019	31.6%	31.7%	30.0%
85	August 17, 2019	23.3%	23.7%	22.3%
86	August 17, 2019	27.7%	27.4%	25.4%
87	August 18, 2019	26.2%	27.8%	26.4%
88	August 18, 2019	31.6%	33.5%	31.7%
89	August 24, 2019	22.9%	24.7%	23.6%
90	August 24, 2019	27.8%	29.3%	28.0%
91	August 25, 2019	26.8%	28.0%	26.5%
92	August 25, 2019	32.3%	32.6%	30.4%
93	August 31, 2019	23.9%	25.1%	23.5%
94	August 31, 2019	28.2%	30.0%	27.9%
95	September 1, 2019	27.6%	29.1%	27.1%
96	September 1, 2019	32.2%	33.7%	31.8%
97	September 7, 2019	27.2%	28.4%	27.0%
98	September 7, 2019	31.6%	32.3%	30.8%
99	September 8, 2019	28.9%	29.0%	26.6%
100	September 8, 2019	34.0%	34.3%	32.4%
101	September 14, 2019	27.5%	27.0%	25.3%
102	September 14, 2019	31.0%	30.0%	27.9%
103	September 15, 2019	29.6%	30.7%	28.8%
104	September 15, 2019	34.2%	34.7%	32.3%
105	September 21, 2019	27.1%	28.4%	25.7%
106	September 21, 2019	32.5%	33.2%	30.4%
107	September 22, 2019	33.4%	33.2%	29.9%
108	September 22, 2019	37.3%	35.9%	33.2%
Average		— (Note: Due to some ratings not recorded, the exact average rating is unknown.)	27.6%	26.1%

== Awards and nominations ==
Year	Award	Category	Recipient	Result	Ref.
2019	12th Korea Drama Awards	Grand Prize (Daesang)	Kim Hae-sook	Nominated	
2019	12th Korea Drama Awards	Best Drama	Mother of Mine	Nominated	
2019	12th Korea Drama Awards	Best Screenplay	Jo Jung-sun	Won	
2019	12th Korea Drama Awards	Best New Actress	Kim Ha-kyung	Nominated	
2019	27th Korean Culture and Entertainment Awards	Grand Prize in a Drama	Kim Hae-sook	Won	
2019	KBS Drama Awards	Top Excellence Award, Actress	Kim Hae-sook	Nominated	
2019	KBS Drama Awards	Excellence Award, Actor in a Serial Drama	Hong Jong-hyun	Nominated	
2019	KBS Drama Awards	Excellence Award, Actor in a Serial Drama	Ki Tae-young	Won	
2019	KBS Drama Awards	Excellence Award, Actress in a Serial Drama	Kim Hae-sook	Nominated	
2019	KBS Drama Awards	Excellence Award, Actress in a Serial Drama	Kim So-yeon	Won	
2019	KBS Drama Awards	Best Young Actress	Joo Ye-rim	Won	
2019	KBS Drama Awards	Best New Actress	Kim Ha-kyung	Nominated	
2019	KBS Drama Awards	Netizen Award, Actor	Hong Jong-hyun	Nominated	
2019	KBS Drama Awards	Netizen Award, Actress	Kim So-yeon	Nominated	
2019	KBS Drama Awards	Best Couple Award	Park Jung Soo and Joo Hyun	Nominated	

== Remake ==
- Vietnam - This series is remade in Vietnam as Thương ngày nắng về, aired on government-owned VTV3 in 2021.
