= Song Yoo-jung =

South Korean actress and model (1994–2021)

- Song in 2020
- Born: June 8, 1994; South Korea
- Died: January 23, 2021 (aged 26); South Korea
- Occupations: Actress; model
- Years active: 2012–2021
- Agent: Sublime

Korean name
- Hangul: 송유정
- RR: Song Yujeong
- MR: Song Yujŏng

Song Yoo-jung (Korean: 송유정; June 8, 1994 – January 23, 2021) was a South Korean actress and model. Song made her acting debut in the MBC series Golden Rainbow (2013). She gained viewers' attention for her performance in the same cable channel series Make a Wish (2014). She also appeared in the television series School 2017 (2017).

She was a model for Estee Lauder cosmetics, The Body Shop, and a spokesperson for Baskin Robbins ice cream.

On January 25, 2021, her agency Sublime announced to the media that the actress had died due to an unknown cause.

== Filmography ==
=== Television series ===
Year	Title	Role	Network	Ref.
2013	Golden Rainbow	teenage Kim Chun-won	MBC	
2014	Make Your Wish	Han Da-won	MBC	
2017	School 2017	Choi Hyun-jung	KBS2	
2019	Dear My Name	Jung Ji Woo		
