= Lee Eun-gyeol =

South Korean magician

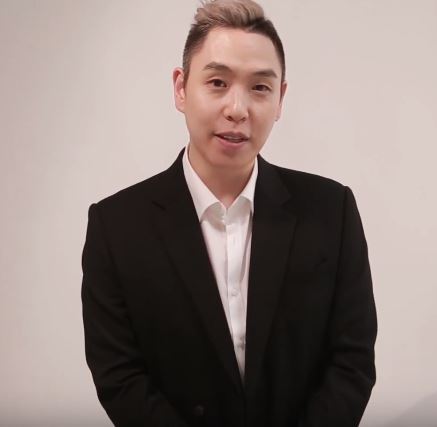
- Born: October 2, 1981 (age 45); Pyeongtaek, South Korea
- Occupation: Magician

Korean name
- Hangul: 이은결
- RR: I Eungyeol
- MR: I Ŭn'gyŏl
- Website: http://www.legproject.com

Lee Eun-gyeol (born October 2, 1981) is a South Korean magician. Lee started performing magic in 1996 and became the first Korean magician to win the grand prize at the esteemed F.I.S.M World Championship of Magic. He is one of the most recognized magicians in South Korea, having appeared on and hosted various South Korean variety programs, such as My Little Television, Trick & True, and I live Alone.

== Awards ==
- "Asia World Magic Contest" (Nagoya), 2001, Winner
- "SA Magic Championship" (Cape Town), 2002, Winner
- "Las Vegas World Magic Seminar" (Las Vegas), 2003, Golden Lion Award Grand Prix
- "FISM" (The Hague), 2003, Runner-up
- "Magic Festival" (Paris), 2003, Les Mandrakes d'or
- "Singapore International Magic Festival" (Singapore), 2005, achievement award
- "IMS" (Stockholm), 2011, Merlin award
