= Trick & True =

South Korean television program

- Hangul: 트릭 & 트루
- RR: Teurik & teuru
- MR: T'ŭrik & t'ŭru
- Genre: Variety
- Presented by: Jun Hyun-moo; Kim Jun-hyun; Lee Eun-gyeol
- Country of origin: South Korea
- Original language: Korean
- No. of episodes: 16 (list of episodes)

Production
- Producer: Lee Se-hee
- Production locations: Seoul, South Korea
- Running time: 80 minutes

Original release
- Network: KBS
- Release: October 25, 2016 – February 15, 2017

Trick & True (Korean: 트릭 & 트루) was a South Korean variety show, which aired on KBS2, KBS' channel for entertainment shows. The show was hosted by television comedy show host Jun Hyun-moo, Kim Jun-hyun and Lee Eun-gyeol. The show replaced Talents for Sale as it got second highest rating, 6.9% in its pilot episode.

== Format ==
The show displayed four acts, performed by either a magician or a KAIST scientist, and it was the guests' job to figure out where the act was purely a magic trick or based on flawed scientific theory or an actual scientific phenomenon. After each answer, the opponent could choose to attempt to modify the act to make it a magic trick or more scientific based on the act.

== Episode and ratings ==
=== 2016 ===
Episode	Air date	Featured guests	Notes	AGB Nielsen Ratings
1	October 25	H.O.T. (Tony An); Koyote (Kim Jong-min); Red Velvet (Irene, Wendy); Peppertones; Twice (Jeongyeon, Sana, Jihyo); Infinite (Sungkyu, Sungyeol); Shinee (Minho)		3.1%
2	November 1	Twice (Jeongyeon, Sana, Jihyo); Red Velvet (Irene, Wendy); Infinite (Sungkyu, Sungyeol); Shinee (Onew); Peppertones		2.7%
3	November 9	Red Velvet (Irene, Wendy); Infinite (Sungkyu, Sungyeol); Shinee (Minho); Peppertones; Cameo: Monsta X (Jooheon, Minhyuk); Apink (Jung Eun-ji, Oh Ha-young)	Moving to the Wednesday timeslot	3.9%
4	November 16	Red Velvet (Irene, Wendy); I.O.I (Kim Se-jeong); Apink (Jung Eun-ji, Oh Ha-young); Peppertones		4.6%
5	November 23	Red Velvet (Joy, Wendy); H.O.T (Tony An); Twice (Sana); M.I.B (Kangnam); Peppertones; Kang Kyun-sung		3.4%
6	November 30	Red Velvet (Joy, Wendy); BtoB (Eunkwang, Changsub); Twice (Sana); Peppertones		3.4%
7	December 7	Red Velvet (Joy, Wendy); B1A4 (Sandeul, Gongchan); Twice (Sana, Chaeyoung); Hello Venus (Nara); Peppertones		3.3%
8	December 14	H.O.T. (Tony An); Red Velvet (Joy, Wendy); ASTRO (Cha Eun-woo); Twice (Dahyun, Mina); Peppertones		3.4%
9	December 21	H.O.T. (Tony An); Red Velvet (Joy, Wendy); Peppertones; M.I.B (Kangnam); Oh My Girl (YooA)		3.7%
10	December 28	Fiestar (Cao Lu); MC Gree; Red Velvet (Joy, Wendy); Laboum (Solbin, Jinyea); Peppertones		3.9%

=== 2017 ===
Episode	Air date	Featured guests	Notes	AGB Nielsen Ratings
11	January 4	Red Velvet (Joy, Wendy); AOA (Seolhyun, Chanmi, Jimin, Yuna); Yoon Jung-soo; Peppertones		4.4%
12	January 11	Red Velvet (Joy, Wendy); AOA (Choa, Hyejeong, Mina); H.O.T. (Tony An); Peppertones		4.1%
13	January 18	Yoo Min-sang; Song Eun-i; Moon Ji-ae; Kangnam; NCT 127 (Doyoung, Jaehyun); Red Velvet (Joy Wendy); Cosmic Girls (Cheng Xiao, Dayoung); Peppertones		4.7%
14	January 25	Song Eun-i; Moon Ji-ae; Kangnam; H.O.T. (Tony An); Red Velvet (Joy, Wendy); Fiestar (Cao Lu); Peppertones		3.8%
15	February 8	Song Eun-i; Moon Ji-ae; Kangnam; H.O.T. (Tony An); Red Velvet (Joy, Wendy); GFriend (Eunha, Yerin, Sowon); ZE:A (Hwang Kwanghee); Yang Se-chan; Peppertones		4.7%
16	February 15	EXID (Hani, Jeonghwa)		4.5%
