= Fly to the Sky discography =

- Studio albums: 9
- EPs: 3
- Live albums: 1
- Compilation albums: 2

This is the discography of South Korean R&B duo Fly to the Sky. They debuted in 1999 under SM Entertainment and were initially pitched as a duo who could sing a variety of genres, before transitioning into R&B beginning with their third album.

== Albums ==
=== Studio albums ===
| Title | Details | Peak chart positions | | Sales |
| Title | Details | KOR RIAK | KOR Gaon | Sales |
|---|---|---|---|---|
| Day By Day | Released: December 14, 1999 (KOR); Label: SM Entertainment; Formats: CD, cassette; Track listing: 1. "INTRO"; 2. "In My Dream" (feat. H.O.T.); 3. "Day by Day"; 4. "I Don't Wanna Say Good-bye"; 5. "Fly to the Sky"; 6. "Wanna Be With You"; 7. "Everything..."; 8. "내겐 너무 예쁜 그대" (You're So Beautiful to Me); 9. "사랑을 닮은 노래" (A Song for Love); 10. "Warning"; 11. "Love Forever"; 12. "In My Dream" [Extended Version] | 7 | — | KOR: 263,111 |
| The Promise | Released: February 2, 2001 (KOR); Label: SM Entertainment; Formats: CD, cassette | 2 | — | KOR: 229,234 |
| Sea of Love | Released: April 26, 2002 (KOR); Label: SM Entertainment; Formats: CD, cassette | 2 | — | KOR: 249,230 |
| Missing You | Released: July 7, 2003 (KOR); Label: SM Entertainment; Formats: CD, cassette; Track listing: 1. "후 (Intro)" (After); 2. "Missing You"; 3. "한" (Grudge); 4. "습관" (Habit); 5. "2 Become 1"; 6. "Magic Song"; 7. "Still"; 8. "Only One"; 9. "Good to You"; 10. "You"; 11. "My Love"; 12. "I'm Gonna" (Streaming TRAX); 13. "Baby Baby Baby" | 2 | — | KOR: 178,731 |
| Gravity | Released: November 8, 2004 (KOR); Label: SM Entertainment; Formats: CD, cassette; Track listing: 1. "Stay"; 2. "중력" (Gravity); 3. "Goodbye; 4. "Old Skool Love; 5. "열감기" (Rest of My Life); 6. "한참이 지나도" (If You Go Away); 7. "Take A Bow"; 8. "사랑을 모르다..."(Monologue); 9. "Tell Me"; 10. "My Neverending Story"; 11. "For You" | 5 | — | KOR: 87,547 |
| Transition | Released: December 20, 2005 (KOR); Label: PFull Entertainment; Formats: CD, cassette; Track listing: 1. "Be With You"; 2. "피" (避); 3. "남자답게" (Like A Man); 4. "노랑나비" (Yellow Butterfly); 5. "빌고 또 빌어도" (No Matter How I Wish and Wish); 6. "하루가 가..." (A Day Goes By...); 7. "사랑해요 우리" (feat. Gummy); 8. "다시 돌아온 너에게" (To You, Who's Come Back); 9. "The Girl Is Mine (feat. Lisa & J.Ho); 10. "폭풍 속에 내 이름 불러주길" Call My Name Out During A Storm); 11. "Question"; 12. "심장" (♡障) | 2 | — | KOR: 145,047 |
| No Limitations | Released: July 7, 2007 (KOR); Label: PFull Entertainment; Formats: CD, cassette; Track listing: 1. "사랑해" (I Love You); 2. "My Angel"; 3. "기억한줌" (Handful of Memories); 4. "가질 수 없어도" (Even If I Can't Have You); 5. "미워해줘" (Please Hate Me); 6. "남겨진 사람" (The One Left Behind); 7. "Let's Get It On"; 8. "Man 2 Man"; 9. "3번째 날" (The Third Day); 10. "결혼하지마" (Don't Marry Him); 11. "그래도 사랑입니다" (feat. Heritage); 12. "오늘도 이쁜걸" (Pretty Today Too); 13. "Kissing You" (feat. Issac Squab of Trespass); 14. "가벼운 사랑" (feat. Hyun Mu & TKO of Trespass) | 1 | — | KOR: 49,477 |
| Decennium | Released: February 12, 2009 (KOR); Label: PFull Entertainment; Formats: CD; Track listing: 1. "Decennium"; 2. "구속" (Restriction); 3. "Close to You" (feat. Dynamic Duo); 4. "가버려 너" (Just Go, You); 5. "Good Girl"; 6. "Song for You"; 7. "즐겨찾기" (feat. Gary of Leessang); 8. "술" (Alcohol); 9. "마지막 기도" (Last Prayer); 10. "사랑이겠지" (It Must Be Love); 11. "눈물아 미안해" (I'm Sorry, Tears); 12. "온음표" (Whole Note) | — | 82 | |
| Continuum | Released: May 20, 2014 (KOR); Labels: H2MEDIA Entertainment; Formats: CD, digital download | — | 4 | KOR: 16,365 |
| Fly High | Released: October 17, 2019 (KOR); Labels: H-Entercom; Formats: CD, digital download, streaming | — | 17 | KOR: 4,844 |
"—" denotes releases that did not chart. Note: The Gaon Music Chart was established in 2010.

=== Live albums ===
| Title | Details | Peak chart positions | Sales |
| Title | Details | KOR RIAK | Sales |
|---|---|---|---|
| 1st Live Concert Unforgettable | Released: April 23, 2004; Label: SM Entertainment; Format: CD; Track listing CD 1: 1. Intro; 2. "한" (Grudge); 3. "Sea of Love"; 4. Opening ment 5. "약속" (Promise)/"Only One"/"Day By Day"; 6. "Magic Song"; 7. "Endless Love"; 8. "Wanna Be With You"; 9. "원망" (Resentment); 10. "습관" (Habit); CD 2: 1. "Condition of My Heart"; 2. Ment; 3. "그대를..." (I Know... But...); 4. "Retry"/"Maybe God Knows"/"Fly to the Sky"; 5. "What U Want"/"No More Games"; 6. "후"; 7. "Missing You"; 8. Closing ment 9. "My Love"; 10. "내겐 너무 예쁜 그대" (You're So Beautiful to Me); 11. "Don't Care No More..."; 12. "Magic Song" (remix) | 26 | KOR: 5,650 |

=== Compilation albums ===
| Title | Details | Peak chart positions | | Sales |
| Title | Details | KOR RIAK | KOR Gaon | Sales |
|---|---|---|---|---|
| Best Album: Eternity | Released: May 24, 2005; Label: SM Entertainment; Format: CD; Track listing CD 1 CD 2 | 8 | — | KOR: 30,881 |
| Back In Time | Released: October 1, 2014; Label: H2MEDIA Entertainment; Format: CD, digital download; Track listing: 1. Sea of Love; 2. 가슴 아파도; 3. Missing You; 4. 남자답게; 5. 그대는 모르죠; 6. 습관; 7. Day By Day; 8. 가슴 아파도 (inst.); 9. Missing You (inst.); 10. Day By Day (inst.) | — | 8 | KOR: 4,761 |
"—" denotes releases that did not chart. Note: The Gaon Music Chart was established in 2010.

== Extended plays ==
| Title | Details | Peak chart positions | Sales |
| Title | Details | KOR Gaon | Sales |
|---|---|---|---|
| Love & Hate | Released: September 14, 2015; Label: H2MEDIA Entertainment, LOEN Entertainment; Format: CD, digital download; Track listing: 1. "그렇게 됐어" (It Happens to Be That Way); 2. "미워해야 한다면" (If I Have to Hate You); 3. "Once Again"; 4. "나쁜 자식"; 5. "Stop Time" | 6 | KOR: 6,208 |
| 너의 계절 (Your Season) | Released: November 15, 2017; Label: H2MEDIA Entertainment, LOEN Entertainment; Format: CD, digital download; Track listing: 1. "너의 계절" (Your Season); 2. "무슨 말이라도 해봐" (Talk to Me); 3. "흔적" (Your Trace); 4. "Into You"; 5. "너의 계절 (Inst.)" | 17 | KOR: 3,585 |
| I | Released: November 13, 2018; Label: H2MEDIA Entertainment, LOEN Entertainment; Format: CD, digital download | 26 | KOR: 3,000 |

== Singles ==
=== As lead artist ===
| Title | Year | Peak chart positions | | Sales | Album |
| Title | Year | KOR | KOR Hot | Sales | Album |
|---|---|---|---|---|---|
| "Day By Day" | 1999 | — | — | | Day by Day |
| "Fly To The Sky" | 1999 | — | — | | Day by Day |
| "The Promise" (약속) | 2001 | — | — | | The Promise |
| "Maybe God Knows" | 2001 | — | — | | The Promise |
| "Sea of Love" | 2002 | — | — | | Sea of Love |
| "Condition of My Heart" | 2002 | — | — | | Sea of Love |
| "Missing You" | 2003 | — | — | | Missing You |
| "Habit" (습관) | 2003 | — | — | | Missing You |
| "Gravity" (중력) | 2004 | — | — | | Gravity |
| "Goodbye" | 2004 | — | — | | Gravity |
| "Blood" (피) | 2005 | — | — | | Transition |
| "Like a Man" (남자답게) | 2005 | — | — | | Transition |
| "My Angel" | 2007 | — | — | | No Limitations |
| "I Love You" (사랑해) | 2007 | — | — | | No Limitations |
| "Restriction" (구속) | 2009 | — | — | | Decennium |
| "You You You" (너를 너를 너를) | 2014 | 1 | 1 | KOR: 1,254,451 | Continuum |
| "It Happens to Be That Way" (그렇게 됐어) | 2015 | 2 | — | KOR: 468,897 | Love & Hate |
| "Your Season" (너의 계절) | 2017 | 39 | — | | Your Season |
| "Thank You for Being Part of My Life" (추억이 돼줘 고마워) | 2019 | 143 | — | | Fly High |

== Contributed singles and tracks ==
| Title | Year | Album | Ref. |
|---|---|---|---|
| "A Song for Love" (사랑을 닮은 노래) | 1999 | Christmas in SMTown | |
| "When Snow Falls" | 2000 | Christmas Winter Vacation In SMTown.com | |
| "Loving for You" | 2000 | Christmas Winter Vacation In SMTown.com | |
| "O Holy Night" | 2001 | Christmas Winter Vacation in SMTown.com – Angel Eyes | |
| "All Night Long" | 2001 | Christmas Winter Vacation in SMTown.com – Angel Eyes | |
| "Forever" | 2002 | Summer Vacation in SMTown.com | |
| "Blind" | 2002 | 2002 Winter Vacation in SMTown.com – My Angel My Light | |
| "Snow Baby" (Dongwan, Jun Jin & Fly to the Sky) | 2002 | 2002 Winter Vacation in SMTown.com – My Angel My Light | |
| "Destiny" | 2003 | Summer Vacation in SMTown.com | |
| "Silent Night, Holy Night" | 2003 | 2003 Winter Vacation in SMTown.com | |
| 가슴 아파도 | 2005 | Fashion 70's OST | |
| 봄날은 간다 | 2014 | Immortal Songs: Singing the Legend — Park Si-chun special | |
| 사랑하기에 | 2014 | Immortal Songs: Singing the Legend — Saturday Night Fever | |
| 겨울이야기 (Lena Park & Fly to the Sky) | 2015 | non-album single | |

== Charted songs ==
| Title | Year | Peak chart positions | | Sales (DL) | Album |
| Title | Year | KOR | KOR Hot | Sales (DL) | Album |
|---|---|---|---|---|---|
| "Your Voice" (니목소리) | 2014 | 9 | 18 | KOR: 317,059 | Continuum |
| "Please Don't Call" (전화하지 말아요) | 2014 | 10 | 7 | KOR: 308,694 | Continuum |
| "Like a Lie" (거짓말 같다) | 2014 | 22 | — | KOR: 154,356 | Continuum |
| "Unknown Farewell" (알 수 없는 이별) (feat. Kim Na-young) | 2014 | 25 | — | KOR: 125,033 | Continuum |
| "We" | 2014 | 50 | — | KOR: 57,807 | Continuum |
| "Missing You" | 2014 | 74 | — | KOR: 27,258 | Back In Time |
| "Habit" (습관) | 2014 | 85 | — | | Back In Time |
| "If I Have to Hate You" (미워해야 한다면) | 2015 | 9 | — | KOR: 160,996 | Love & Hate |
| "Once Again" | 2015 | 64 | — | KOR: 34,465 | Love & Hate |
| "나쁜 자식" | 2015 | 76 | — | KOR: 31,111 | Love & Hate |
| "Stop Time" | 2015 | 95 | — | KOR: 26,851 | Love & Hate |
| "겨울이야기" (Lena Park & Fly to the Sky) | 2015 | 50 | — | KOR: 45,424 | Non-album single |
"—" denotes releases that did not chart or were not released in that region. "*" Billboard Korea K-Pop Hot 100 was introduced in August 2011 and discontinued in July 2014.
