= Kim Ji-hoon (actor, born 1981) =

South Korean actor (born 1981)

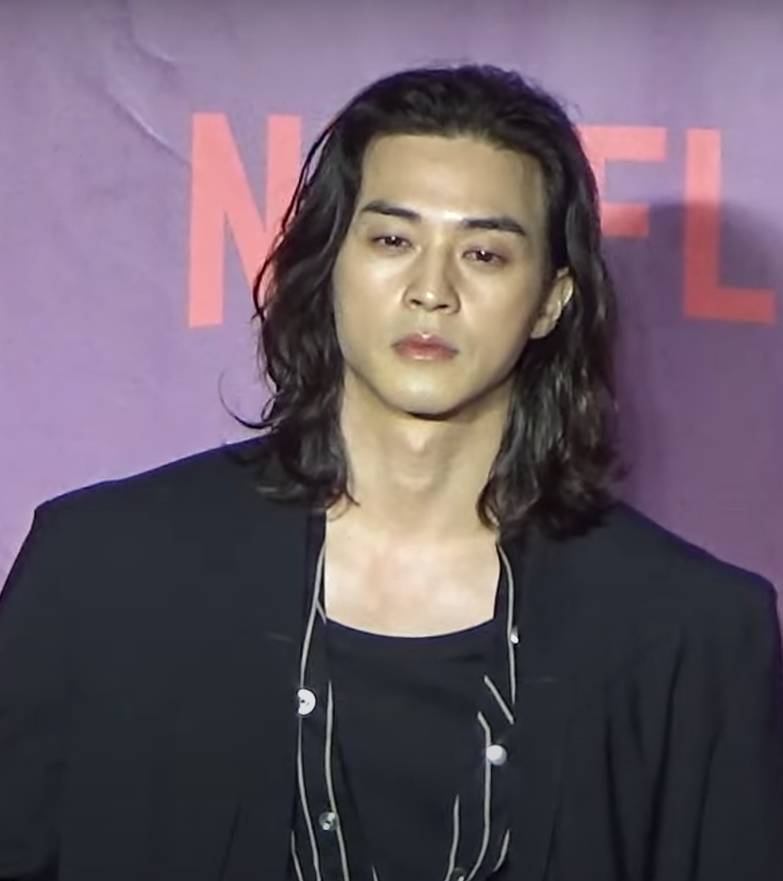
- Kim in February 2023
- Born: May 9, 1981 (age 45); Seoul, South Korea
- Other name: Kim Ji-hun
- Education: Ajou University
- Occupation: Actor
- Years active: 2002–present
- Agent: Big Picture

Korean name
- Hangul: 김지훈
- RR: Gim Jihun
- MR: Kim Chihun

Kim Ji-hoon (Korean: 김지훈; born May 9, 1981) is a South Korean actor. He is best known for his romantic comedies on television such as The Golden Age of Daughters-in-Law (2007), Love Marriage (also known as Matchmaker's Lover, 2008), Stars Falling from the Sky (also known as Wish Upon a Star, 2010), and My Cute Guys (2013). In 2010, he also appeared in the film Natalie, and cable mystery series Joseon X-Files. In 2023 he appeared in Lee Chung-hyun's Netflix film Ballerina. He was cast as a hired assassin in Amazon Prime Video 2025 TV series Butterfly.

== Filmography ==
=== Film ===
Year	Title	Role	Notes	Ref.
2010	Natalie	Min-woo		
2017	The Age of Blood	Lee In-jwa		
2023	Ballerina	Choi Pro		

=== Television series ===
Year	Title	Role	Notes	Ref.
2002	Loving You	Choi Sung-wook		
2003	A Problem at My Younger Brother's House	Park Young-goo		
2004	MBC Best Theater – "Kang Jang-soo's Love House"	Kang Jang-soo		
2004	Toji, the Land	young Kim Gil-sang		
2005	Love Hymn	Kang Hyuk		
2005	Golden Apple	Kim Kyung-gu		
2006	Great Inheritance	Choi Shi-wan		
2006	How Much Love	Seo Dong-soo		
2007	Flowers for My Life	Go Eun-tak		
2007	Daughters-in-Law	Lee Bok-su		
2008	Why Did You Come to My House?	Jo Gi-dong		
2008	Love Marriage	Park Hyun-soo		
2009	Empress Cheonchu	Hyeonjong		
2010	Stars Falling from the Sky	Won Kang-ha		
2010	Joseon X-Files	Kim Hyung-do		
2011	Marching	Na Yo-han		
2013	Flower Boys Next Door	Oh Jin-rak		
2013	Goddess of Marriage	Kang Tae-wook		
2014	Jang Bo-ri Is Here!	Lee Jae-hwa		
2015	KBS Drama Special – "Funny Woman"	Oh Jung-woo		
2016	Sweet Stranger and Me	Jo Dong-jin		
2017	Please Find Her	Kim Jung-nam		
2017	Bad Thief, Good Thief	Han Jun-hee / Jang Min-jae		
2018	The Rich Son	Lee Kwang-jae		
2019	Babel	Tae Min-ho		
2020	Flower of Evil	Baek Hee-Sung		
2022	Money Heist: Korea – Joint Economic Area	Denver / Oh Taek-su		
2022	Behind Every Star	Kim Ji-hoon	Cameo	
2023	Love to Hate You	Do Won-jun		
2023	Death's Game	Park Tae-woo	Special appearance	
2025	The Haunted Palace	King Lee Jeong		
2025	Butterfly	Gun		
2025	Nice to Not Meet You	Joo Jae-hyung		
2025	Dear X	Choi Jeong-ho	Cameo (episode 2–4, 7–8)	

=== Web series ===
Year	Title	Role	Notes	Ref.
2005	Yap	Kim Ji-hoon		
2016	7 First Kisses	Man in the mall	Cameo (episode 1)	
2026	The Affair Was Just the Beginning	Jae-hong		

=== Television shows ===
Year	Title	Role	Notes	Ref.
2001	Hotline	VJ		
2001	Cooking and Cooking Poppang (요리조리 팡팡)	Host		
2008	Sang Sang Plus - Season 2	Host		
2014	Saturday Night Live Korea	Host	Episode 98	
2015	Let's Eat with Friends			
2015	Some Guys, Some Girls			
2017	Crime Scene	Cast member	Season 3	
2023	Black: I Saw the Devil	Cast member	Crime Thriller Crime Documentary (Season 2)	

=== Music video appearances ===
Year	Song title	Artist	Ref.
2002	"Propose"	Kangta	
2002	"Don't Go Away Ver. 2"	Chu Ga Yeoul	
2002	"Waiting.."	BoA	
2002	"Wedding"	Shinhwa	
2003	"Habit"	Fly to the Sky	
2003	"Maybe"	Dana	
2003	"Because I Want To Hold On"	Eunhyul	
2006	"300 Won Coins"	Tutti	
2006	"Memory"	Yurisangja	
2007	"Beautiful Woman"	Lee Ki-chan	
2007	"Did You Forget?"	Hana	
2007	"Can't Forget"	PK Heman feat. Lee Ji Hye	
2008	"You Said You Love Me"	Sungje	
2009	"The Following Car Is Honking"	MC the Max	
2024	"Why didn't I realize"	JeA	

== Theater ==
Year	Title	Role
2010	University of Laughs	Playwright

== Hosting ==
Year	Title	Notes	Ref.
2010	5th Seoul International Drama Awards	With Hahm Eun-jung	

== Awards and nominations ==
Name of the award ceremony, year presented, category, nominee of the award, and the result of the nomination
Award ceremony	Year	Category	Nominee / Work	Result	Ref.
APAN Star Awards	2014	Excellence Award, Actor in a Serial Drama	Jang Bo-ri is Here!	Won	
APAN Star Awards	2018	Excellence Award, Actor in a Serial Drama	The Rich Son	Nominated	
Baeksang Arts Awards	2021	Best Supporting Actor (TV)	Flower of Evil	Nominated	
KBS Drama Awards	2007	Best New Actor	The Golden Age of Daughters-in-Law	Won	
KBS Drama Awards	2007	Best Couple Award with Lee Soo-kyung	The Golden Age of Daughters-in-Law	Won	
Korea Culture and Entertainment Awards	2014	Top Excellence Award, Actor in a Drama	Jang Bo-ri is Here!	Won	
MBC Drama Awards	2006	Best New Actor	How Much Love	Nominated	
MBC Drama Awards	2014	Top Excellence Award, Actor in a Serial Drama	Jang Bo-ri is Here!	Won	
MBC Drama Awards	2018	Top Excellence Award, Actor in a Soap Opera	The Rich Son	Nominated	
SBS Drama Awards	2013	Excellence Award, Actor in a Weekend/Daily Drama	Goddess of Marriage	Won	
SBS Drama Awards	2025	Excellence Award, Actor in a Miniseries Humanity/Fantasy Drama	The Haunted Palace	Won	
