= Continuum (Fly to the Sky album) =

Studio album by Fly to the Sky
- Released: May 20, 2014
- Genres: K-pop; R&B
- Length: 38:21
- Language: Korean
- Labels: H2MEDIA (distributed by LOEN Entertainment)

Fly to the Sky chronology
Decennium (2009)	Continuum (2014)	Love & Hate (2015)

Continuum is the ninth studio album by South Korean R&B duo Fly to the Sky, released on May 20, 2014 by H2MEDIA and distributed by LOEN Entertainment. It marks their first release since 2009 due to the members ventured into individual solo activities.

== Overview ==
The album title was derived from the eponymous Latin word. It was conceived by member Brian as a statement that the duo had never disbanded despite numerous rumors and to reiterate their desire to continue making music together.

== Track listing ==
Bold tracks are noted as the promotional tracks of the album.

No.	Title	Lyrics	Music	Translated Title	Length
1.	"You You You" (너를 너를 너를; Neoreul neoreul neoreul)	Lee Sang-in	Lee Sang-in^{[b]}		4:19
2.	"Please Don't Call" (전화하지 말아요; Jeonhwahaji mal-ayo)	Jo Eun-hee	Shin In-soo^{[b]}		3:31
3.	"Unknown Farewell (feat. Kim Na-young)" (알 수 없는 이별; Al su eomneun yibyeol)		Kim Se-jin,^{[b]} Seo Jung-jin	A Confusing Breakup	3:44
4.	"Your Voice" (니목소리; Ni moksori)				4:25
5.	"Like a Lie" (거짓말 같다; Geojitmal gatda)	Kim Eana	Jo Young-soo (ko)		4:06
6.	"You" (너; Neo)				3:03
7.	"Even If Ten Years Pass" (십년이지나도; Sipnyeon ijinado)	Hwanhee		Years Apart	3:49
8.	"Kiss & Say Goodbye"				4:05
9.	"So Cool"				4:00
10.	"We"				3:12
Total length:					38:21

- ^{^[a]} signifies a producer that has multiple song credits for the album.
- ^{^[b]} signifies a composer who is also the arranger.

== Release and reception ==
Continuum was released on May 20, 2014 at midnight (KST) and launched by members Brian and Hwanhee during the showcase at 8am. The album debuted at #4 on the Gaon Album Chart. Every track in the album charted on the Gaon Digital Chart, with the title track "You You You" (너를 너를 너를) totaling over a million downloads by the end of the year.

"You You You" achieved an "all kill", debuting at #1 on the Gaon Digital Chart and Billboard's Korea K-Pop Hot 100. The accompanying music video for "You You You" was uploaded on YouTube. The song won the R&B genre award at the 6th Melon Music Awards.

English-language K-pop blog Seoulbeats.com described the album as "perfect for those days when you just aren’t “feeling” life, and need an emotional release".
