= Sea of Love (Fly to the Sky album) =

Studio album by Fly to the Sky
- Released: April 26, 2002
- Genre: R&B; K-pop
- Length: 57:45
- Label: SM

Fly to the Sky chronology
The Promise (2001)	Sea of Love (2002)	Missing You (2004)

Singles from Sea of Love
- 1. "Sea of Love"; 2. "Condition of My Heart"

Sea of Love is the third studio album by South Korean R&B duo Fly to the Sky. It was released via SM Entertainment on April 26, 2002. Commercially, the album peaked at number two on the monthly RIAK album chart and sold almost 250,000 copies by the end of the year.

== Overview ==
"Condition of My Heart"
Heavy ballad written by American singer Brian McKnight.

The duo started off with the poppy ballad "Sea of Love", which became a strong single for the duo, being played and promoted heavily on the various music and performance charts. Fany had to perform the song solo while Brian was finishing his studies at Rutgers University, which why the solo version was included as a bonus track on the album.

The second single to come from the album was "Condition of My Heart", a ballad written by Brian McKnight and very unlike their previous singles. It was also a strong success, and would become the song that cemented their signature style, as it (and all the singles following afterwards) were vocally strong ballads.

== Music video ==
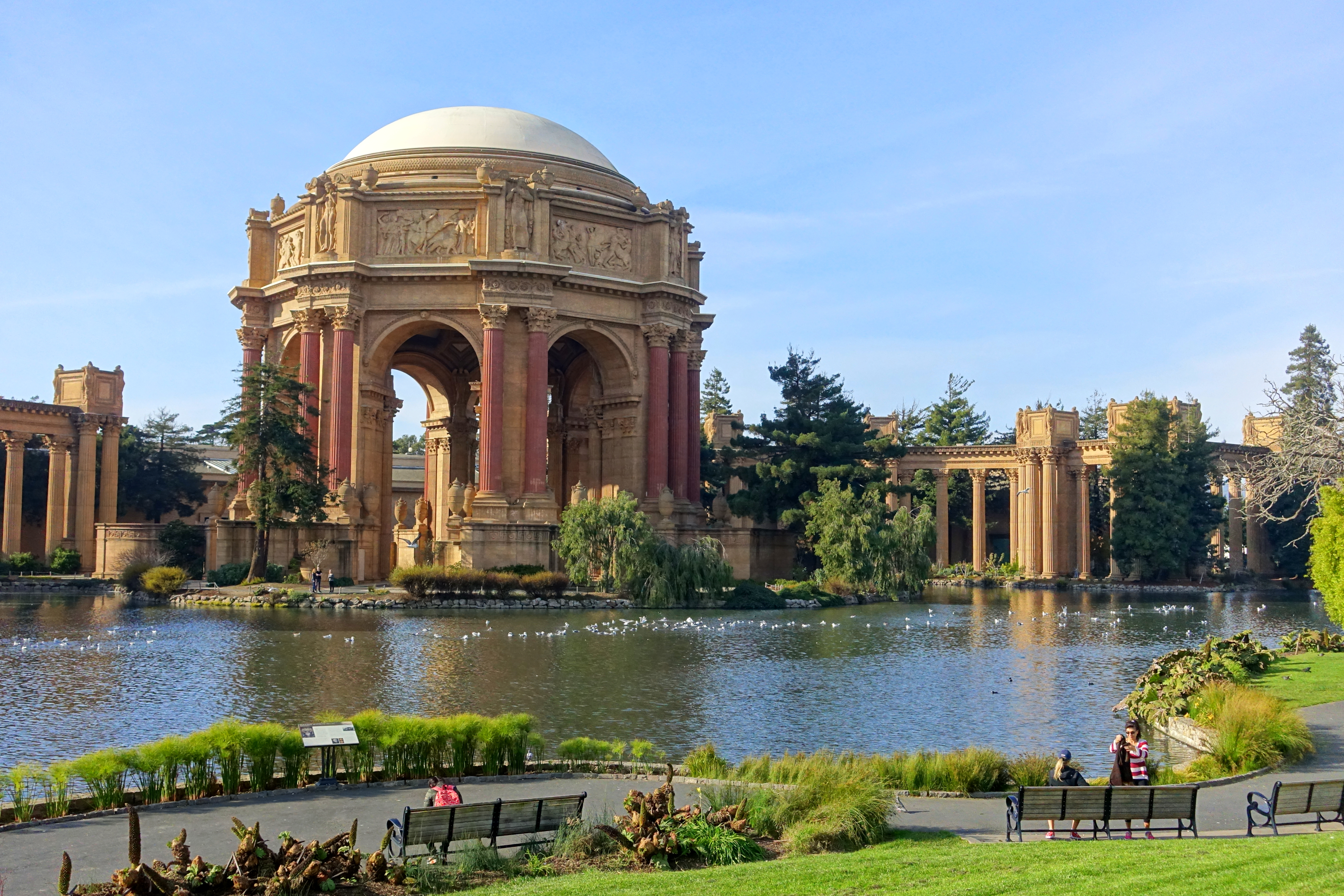
Filming locations for the title track's music video include the Palace of Fine Arts in San Francisco.

=== Sea of Love ===
The video begins with the duo playing football on the beach with their American friends in San Francisco, with the scenes alternating between the football game and singing in front of the Golden Gate Bridge wearing casual shirts and dancing around the Colonnades and Dome of the Palace of Fine Arts. Throughout the video the duo struggles to win the game. One of the American girls watching the game seems to be attracted to Fany as she stands up with a concerned look on her face when he falls. When he finally makes a touchdown with help from Brian, the song reaches the climax, and the same girl stands up and cheers. After the game ends, the duo drives down the Golden Gate bridge in a sports car. In August 2022, the video was remastered and uploaded to SM's official YouTube channel.

== Accolades ==
Music program awards
Song	Program	Date
"Sea of Love"	SBS's Inkigayo	July 14, 2002
"Sea of Love"	SBS's Inkigayo	July 21, 2002

== Track listing ==
Sea of Love track listing
No.	Title	Lyrics	Music	Arrangement	Length
1.	"Sea of Love"	Yoo Young-jin	Yoo Young-jin	Yoo Young-jin	4:23
2.	"Condition of My Heart"	Hong Ji-yu	Brian McKnight	Hwang Seong-jae	4:53
3.	"Rains"	Yoo Young-jin	Brian Joo, Yuhan Jin	Yuhan Jin	4:25
4.	"You (I Know... But...)"	Jeon Seung-woo	Kim Do-hoon	Kim Do-hoon	3:54
5.	"Future Tonight"	Hong Ji-yu	Cho Young-bae	Ahn Ik-soo	3:49
6.	"Say My Name"	Kim Dong-hyun	Park Seong-soo	Park Seong-soo	4:25
7.	"Trust"	Ji Kook-hyun	Ji Kook-hyun	Ji Kook-hyun	4:34
8.	"No More Games"	Seo Yong-geun	Seo Yong-geun	Seo Yong-geun	4:33
9.	"In Love"	Lee Ahn	Saylor Shin	Saylor Shin	4:05
10.	"How Many Nights How Many Days"	Young-hu Kim	Young-hu Kim	Young-hu Kim	4:24
11.	"All My Love"	Bae Hwa-young	Koh Young-jo	Koh Young-jo	3:55
12.	"5 Minutes"	Yoo Young-jin	Yuhan Jin	Yuhan Jin	3:16
13.	"Resentment (Tragic Love)"	민설	Kim Do-hoon	Kim Do-hoon	3:58
14.	"Sea of Love (Fany ver.)"	Yoo Young-jin	Yoo Young-jin	Yoo Young-jin	4:23
Total length:					57:45

== Charts and sales ==
=== Monthly charts ===
Chart (May 2002)	Peak position
South Korean Albums (RIAK)	2

=== Yearly charts ===
Chart (2002)	Position
South Korean Albums (RIAK)	20

=== Sales ===
Region	Sales
South Korea (RIAK)	249,230
