= Kim Ok-vin =

South Korean actress (born 1987)

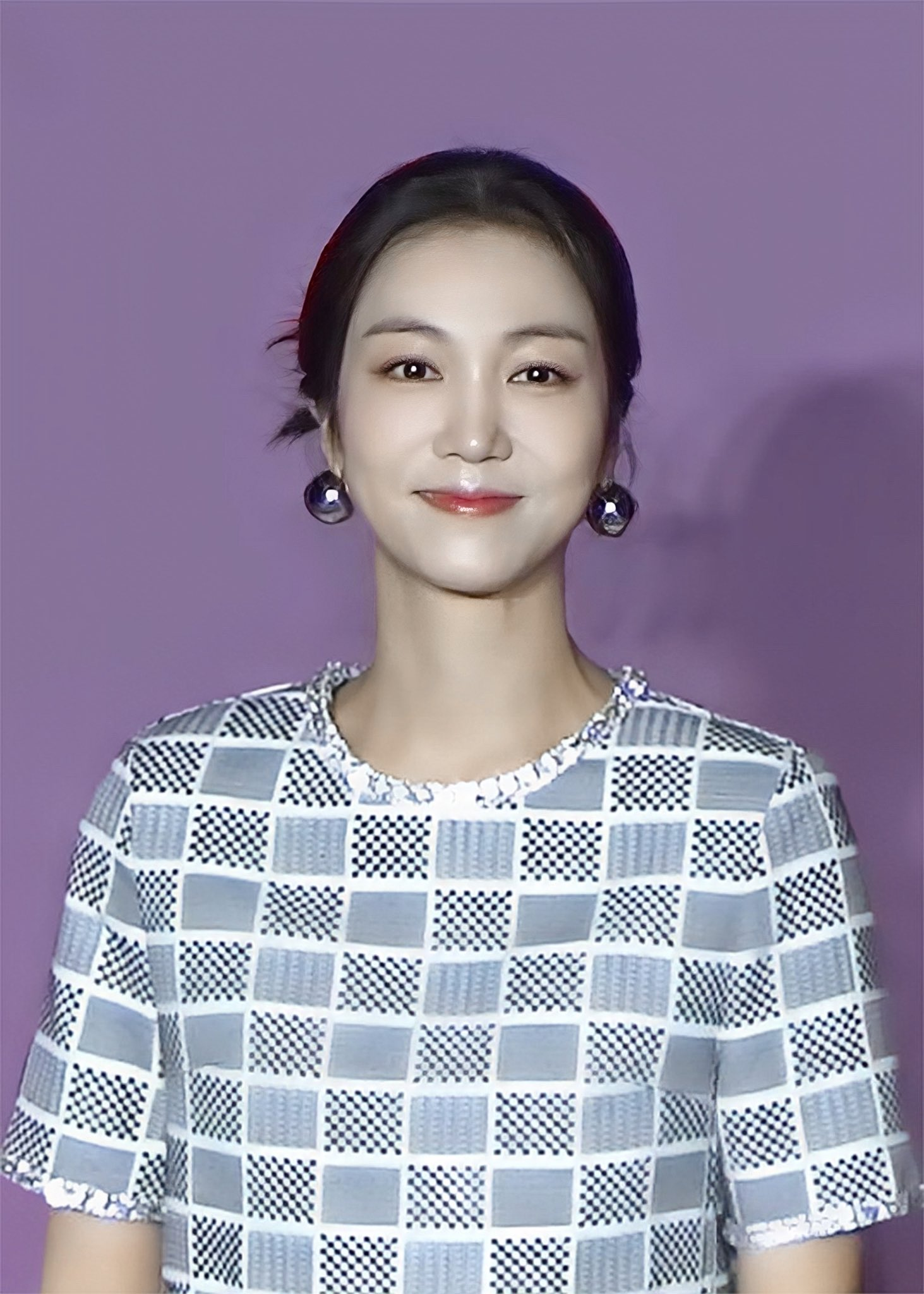
- Kim in February 2023
- Born: 3 January 1987 (age 39); Suncheon, South Korea
- Other name: Kim Ok-bin
- Education: Kyung Hee University
- Occupations: Actress; screenwriter
- Years active: 2005–present
- Agent: Ghost Studio
- Spouse: Unknown (m. 2025)
- Relatives: Chae Seo-jin (sister)

Korean name
- Hangul: 김옥빈
- Hanja: 金玉彬
- RR: Gim Okbin
- MR: Kim Okpin

Kim Ok-vin (Korean: 김옥빈; born 3 January 1987), also known as Kim Ok-bin, is a South Korean actress. She made her debut in an online beauty contest in 2004, and began her acting career with a role in the 2005 film Voice. She appeared in the television drama series Over the Rainbow, and in films such as Dasepo Naughty Girls, The Accidental Gangster and the Mistaken Courtesan and The Villainess. She has received several award nominations, and won Best Actress at the 2009 Sitges Film Festival for her role in Thirst.

== Early life ==
Kim was born on 3 January 1987 and is the eldest of three siblings. She trained in martial arts as a child, and has attained third dan in Hapkido and second dan in Taekwondo. She also practices Muay Thai and boxing. She is interested in cars and motorcycles, speed racing, building computers, and sports such as football and baseball. She is ambidextrous.

== Career ==
=== 2004–2008: Career beginnings ===
Kim made her debut in an online beauty contest hosted by web portal Naver in 2004. Despite having little prior acting experience, she was cast as one of the three leads in the 2005 horror film Voice, for which she was nominated for Best New Actress at both the Blue Dragon Film Awards and Baeksang Arts Awards.

She next starred as the lead actress in Hanoi Bride, a two-part SBS drama aired during the Chuseok holidays to commemorate the 30th anniversary of the Vietnam War. Her performance as Vietnamese girl Lý Thị Vũ caught the attention of film director E J-yong, who cast her as the main character in his 2006 film Dasepo Naughty Girls, based on a popular webcomic. E commented, "Not many young actresses would be mature enough to completely understand the heroine who has to support the family by selling herself as a prostitute... But Kim seemed like an actress who had the ability to understand the character." She was initially reluctant to take the part, as the original comic had some explicit scenes, but decided to trust the director based on his previous work.

Kim auditioned for a part in the 2006 KBS drama series Hello, God, and after impressing director Ji Yeong-soo with her "intense determination," was handed a leading role as confidence trickster Seo Eun-hye. During filming she expressed self-doubts, saying, "I used to cry two or three times everyday [sic] when the shooting began because I felt that I was a rubbish actress," and with a tight schedule that allowed her less than two hours of sleep per day, was reported to have collapsed on set. Later that year, she appeared in MBC drama Over the Rainbow as aspiring pop singer Jeong Hee-su, a part which required her to sing and master difficult breakdance moves. Series producer Han Hee complimented Kim, saying, "She is a bold actress. She's very enthusiastic about her role with an almost perfectionist attitude." However, she caused some concern when she admitted to only eating one meal per day while filming the drama.

In her next film, The Accidental Gangster and the Mistaken Courtesan, she starred alongside Lee Jung-jae as a Joseon-era kisaeng. She said she had found it difficult performing a historical role, but was helped by consultations with director Yeo Gyoon-dong and studied traditional Korean dance for two months. The film opened in South Korea in December 2008.

=== 2009–present ===
In February 2008, Kim was announced as the female lead in Park Chan-wook's Thirst, in a part that required numerous adult scenes with co-star Song Kang-ho. Kim felt that she learned much from working alongside Song, while Park commended her versatility in showing the different sides to her character. Thirst topped the South Korean box office during its opening weekend with over one million admissions, and was invited to the 2009 Cannes Film Festival where it won the Jury Prize. Richard Corliss of Time praised Kim's performance in the film, saying, "It's the lovely Kim, just 22, who is the revelation here. She can play – no, she can be – a creature of mute docility, then searching ardor, then explosive eroticism, then murderous intent. She is Lady Chatterley and Lady Macbeth in one smoldering package." The Hollywood Reporter's Maggie Lee was more critical, commenting, "[Kim's] high-pitched neurosis is sometimes grating, but for a relative newcomer, she keeps her continuous personality transformations in stride," while Kyu Hyun Kim of OhmyNews said, "Kim is stunningly sexy in both wilted-housewife and full-blown femme fatale modes, and throws all of herself into the role," but considered her "a bit too young and contemporary" for the role. She was a co-recipient of the Best Actress award at the 42nd Sitges Film Festival (shared with Elena Anaya for Hierro), and received further nominations at the Blue Dragon Film Awards, the Green Globe Film Awards, and the Baeksang Arts Awards.

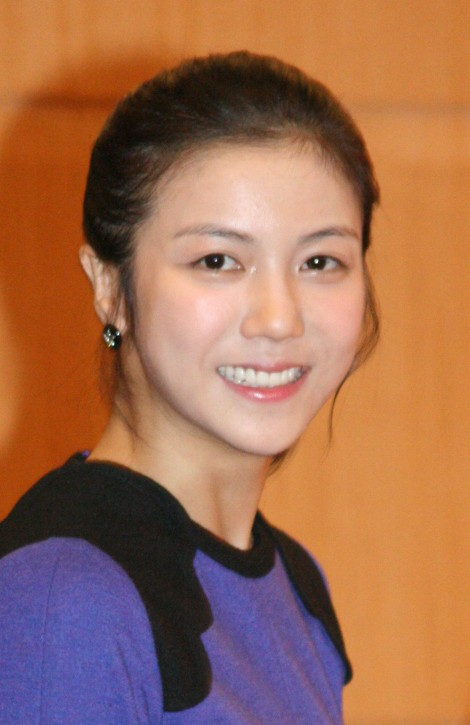
Kim in November 2009

Kim was reunited with director E J-yong for Actresses, a low-budget film in which she and five other leading Korean actresses portray themselves at a special Vogue magazine shoot. Like her co-stars, Kim agreed to take part with no guarantee and shared writing credits. The film opened on 10 December 2009.

In 2011, Kim was to star opposite Eric Mun in KBS's action drama Poseidon, set for broadcast in July 2011. However they dropped out when production was halted after the Bombardment of Yeonpyeong incident in November 2010. Then Kim appeared in the war film The Front Line, playing a sharpshooter.

Then Kim once again worked with E J-yong for the short How to Fall in Love in 10 Minutes, as part of the Samsung Galaxy Note-sponsored film Cine Note. E J-yong had contacted actors that he's personally close to and offered them the roles, and most of them accepted without pay based on their friendship and loyalty to him, Kim included. The filmmaking process was later depicted in Behind the Camera, E's 2013 mockumentary with a similar concept as Actresses.

Kim then dyed her hair pink for the 2012 comedy Over My Dead Body, which she said she greatly enjoyed filming, being a fan of the genre. This was followed by a leading role in the science fiction-thriller film 11 A.M., which was released in the second half of 2013.

Kim returned to television in 2013 in the KBS period epic The Blade and Petal set in the Goguryeo dynasty, her first TV drama in seven years. In 2014, Kim played a pickpocket in the jTBC cable comedy series Steal Heart. Minority Opinion, her courtroom drama alongside Yoon Kye-sang and Yoo Hae-jin which had wrapped filming in 2013, was released in theaters in 2015.

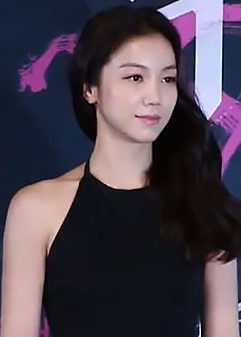
Kim in May 2017

In 2017, Kim starred in action thriller film The Villainess. The film was invited to the Cannes Film Festival, where it had its world premiere.

In 2018, Kim starred in military thriller The Discloser. The same year, she returned to the small screen in OCN's fantasy thriller drama Children of a Lesser God.

In 2020, Kim starred in the historical fantasy drama Arthdal Chronicles, alongside Song Joong-ki, Kim Ji-won and other notable names.

In November 2022, Kim signed with Ghost Studio.

== Personal life ==
On 1 October 2025, Kim announced her upcoming marriage to a non-celebrity. Kim married on 16 November 2025.

== Filmography ==
=== Film ===
Year	Title	Role	Notes/Ref.
2005	Voice	Park Young-eon	
2006	Arang		Cameo appearance
2006	Dasepo Naughty Girls	Poor Girl	
2008	The Accidental Gangster and the Mistaken Courtesan	Seol-ji	
2009	Thirst	Tae-ju	
2009	Actresses	Herself	Also co-screenwriter
2011	The Front Line	Cha Tae-gyeong	
2012	Over My Dead Body	Han Dong-hwa	
2013	Behind the Camera	Herself	
2013	11 A.M.	Young-eun	
2015	Minority Opinion	Gong Soo-kyung	
2017	The Villainess	Sook-hee	
2017	The Discloser	Jung-sook	
2022	Life Is But A Dream	Sable	Short film

=== Television series ===
Year	Title	Role	Notes/Ref.
2005	Hanoi Bride	Lý Thị Vũ	
2006	Hello, God	Seo Eun-hye	
2006	Over the Rainbow	Jeong Hee-su	Also sang "Start" on the soundtrack
2007	War of Money	Lee Soo-young	Appeared in the four bonus episodes
2013	The Blade and Petal	Princess So-hee/Moo-young	
2014	Steal Heart	Kang Yoo-na	
2018	Children of a Lesser God	Kim Dan	
2019–2023	Arthdal Chronicles	Tae Al-ha	Season 1–2
2021	Dark Hole	Lee Hwa-sun	

=== Web series ===
Year	Title	Role	Ref.
2023	Love to Hate You	Yeo Mi-ran	

=== Web shows ===
Year	Title	Role	Notes	Ref.
2023	Saturday Night Live Korea	Host	Episode 8 – Season 3	

=== Music video appearances ===
Year	Song title	Artist
2004	"A Cold Heart"	Lee Seung-chul
2006	"Tomorrow"	Hwanhee
2006	"Dangerous Love"	Lena Park
2007	"Absentmindedly"	Zi-A

== Accolades ==
=== Awards and nominations ===
Year	Award	Category	Nominated work	Result	Ref.
2005	26th Blue Dragon Film Awards	Best New Actress	Voice	Nominated	
2006	42nd Baeksang Arts Awards	Best New Actress	Voice	Nominated	
2006	MBC Drama Awards	Best New Actress	Over the Rainbow	Nominated	
2006	MBC Drama Awards	PD Award	Over the Rainbow	Won	
2006	KBS Drama Awards	Best New Actress	Hello, God	Nominated	
2009	45th Baeksang Arts Awards	Best New Actress	The Accidental Gangster and the Mistaken Courtesan	Nominated	
2009	42nd Sitges Film Festival	Best Actress	Thirst	Won	
2009	30th Blue Dragon Film Awards	Best Actress	Thirst	Nominated	
2010	Green Globe Film Awards	Best International Actress	Thirst	Nominated	
2010	46th Baeksang Arts Awards	Best Actress	Thirst	Nominated	
2010	Fangoria Chainsaw Awards	Best Supporting Actress	Thirst	Nominated	
2013	KBS Drama Awards	Excellence Award, Actress in a Mid-length Drama	The Blade and Petal	Nominated	
2014	3rd APAN Star Awards	Excellence Award, Actress in a Serial Drama	Steal Heart	Won	
2015	51st Baeksang Arts Awards	Best Actress (TV)	Steal Heart	Nominated	
2016	21st Chunsa Film Art Awards	Best Supporting Actress	Minority Opinion	Nominated	
2017	26th Buil Film Awards	Best Actress	The Villainess	Nominated	
2017	1st The Seoul Awards	Best Actress	The Villainess	Nominated	
2017	54th Grand Bell Awards	Best Actress	The Villainess	Nominated	
2017	38th Blue Dragon Film Awards	Best Actress	The Villainess	Nominated	
2018	54th Baeksang Arts Awards	Best Actress	The Villainess	Nominated	
2018	23rd Chunsa Film Art Awards	Best Actress	The Villainess	Won	
2023	9th APAN Star Awards	Excellence Award, Actress in a Serial Drama	Arthdal Chronicles 2	Won	

=== Listicles ===
Name of publisher, year listed, name of listicle, and placement
Publisher	Year	Listicle	Placement	Ref.
Korean Film Council	2021	Korean Actors 200 (Note: Introduces 200 actors that best represent the present and future of Korean cinema to the people in the film industry all over the world.)	Included	
