= Natalie (film) =

- South Korean poster
- Directed by: Ju Kyung-jung
- Written by: Ju Kyung-jung; Kim Wook
- Produced by: Ju Kyung-jung
- Starring: Lee Sung-jae; Kim Ji-hoon; Park Hyun-jin
- Cinematography: Kim Yung-chul
- Edited by: Cho Min-yeong; Kim Chang-ju
- Music by: Si Kyung-won
- Distributed by: Lotte Entertainment
- Release date: 28 October 2010
- Running time: 88 minutes
- Country: South Korea
- Language: Korean
- Box office: $1,042,048

Natalie (Korean: 나탈리) is a 2010 South Korean romance mystery erotic film co-written, directed and produced by Ju Kyung-jung. It was the first South Korean 3D film.

The film's title refers to a famous female nude piece by sculptor Jun-hyuk (Lee Sung-jae). The model of the piece has remained a great mystery in the art world, but a young critic (Kim Ji-hoon) claims to have also loved the femme fatale (Park Hyun-jin) who had been Jun-hyuk's muse.

== Plot ==
Mi-ran, a beautiful dance student (Park Hyun-jin), becomes the model, muse and lover of her philandering sculptor-professor Jun-hyuk (Lee Sung-jae). When Mi-ran realizes that she will never be more than a model for Jun-hyuk, she leaves him for her stalkerish fellow student Min-woo (Kim Ji-hoon).

The story takes place 10 years later, when Min-woo and Jun-hyuk reunite as art critic and interviewee, and the two compare their conflicting memories of Mi-ran, who seems to have since disappeared.

== Cast ==
- Lee Sung-jae as Hwang Jun-hyuk
- Kim Ji-hoon as Jang Min-woo
- Park Hyun-jin as Oh Mi-ran
- Kim Gi-yeon as Park Hyo-rim
