= Choi Kwon =

South Korean actor

- Born: Seoul, South Korea
- Education: Kyungmin College – Theater and Film
- Occupation: Actor
- Years active: 2003–present
- Agent: KeyEast

Korean name
- Hangul: 최권
- RR: Choe Gwon
- MR: Ch'oe Kwŏn

Choi Kwon is a South Korean actor. He is best known for his roles as an aspiring dancer in Over the Rainbow (2006), and a North Korean soldier in The King 2 Hearts (2012).

== Filmography ==
=== Television series ===
Year	Title	Role
2005	A Love to Kill	
2006	Over the Rainbow	Choi Kyu-ho ("King Mart")
2007	Mermaid Story	Detective Lee
2007	Kimchi Cheese Smile	Choi Kwon
2009	Smile, You	Park Kyung-soo
2012	Ice Adonis	Min Kyung-joo
2012	The King 2 Hearts	Kwon Young-bae
2012	Tasty Life	Bae Sam-bong
2013	Heartless City	Detective Shin
2015	The Producers	Manager Kim
2016	The Legend of the Blue Sea	young Manager Nam / Joon-jae's friend in Joseon counterpart
2017	Hit the Top	policeman interrogating Choi Woo-seung (Special appearance, Ep. 2)

=== Film ===
Year	Title	Role
2003	Tube	Guard at the market
2006	Holy Daddy	Kim Kyung-soo
2007	Scout	School freshman
2009	Running Turtle	Pyo Jae-seok
2010	Foxy Festival	In-su
2013	Rockin' on Heaven's Door	Gwang-sam
2014	Murderer	Young man (cameo)

== Theater ==
Year	Title	Role
	The Good Doctor	
	Six Minute Murder	
	Jesus Christ Superstar	Jesus Christ
