= 2007 KBS Drama Awards =

21st edition of award ceremony

- Date: December 31, 2007
- Hosted by: Tak Jae-hoon; Lee Da-hae

Television coverage
- Network: KBS

The 2007 KBS Drama Awards is a ceremony honoring the outstanding achievement in television on the Korean Broadcasting System (KBS) network for the year of 2007. It was held on December 31, 2007, and hosted by Tak Jae-hoon and Lee Da-hae.

== Nominations and winners ==
(Winners denoted in bold)

Grand Prize (Daesang)
**Choi Soo-jong** – **Dae Jo-yeong**
Top Excellence Award, Actor	Top Excellence Award, Actress
**Lee Deok-hwa** – **Dae Jo-yeong**; Cha Tae-hyun – Flowers for My Life; Choi Soo-jong – Dae Jo-yeong; Kim Suk-hoon – A Happy Woman; Kwon Sang-woo – Cruel Love	**Chae Rim** – **Dal-ja's Spring**; **Kim Hyun-joo** – **In-soon Is Pretty**; Kang Hye-jung – Flowers for My Life; Lee Yo-won – Cruel Love; Park Ye-jin – Dae Jo-yeong
Excellence Award, Actor in a Miniseries	Excellence Award, Actress in a Miniseries
**Kang Ji-hwan** – **Capital Scandal**; Ju Ji-hoon – Lucifer; Kim Min-jun – In-soon Is Pretty; Lee Min-ki – Dal-ja's Spring; Uhm Tae-woong – Lucifer	**Han Ji-min** – **Capital Scandal**; **Lee Da-hae** – **Hello! Miss**; Han Go-eun – Capital Scandal; Shin Min-a – Lucifer
Excellence Award, Actor in a Serial Drama	Excellence Award, Actress in a Serial Drama
**Jang Hyun-sung** – **Daughters-in-Law**; Im Dong-jin – Dae Jo-yeong; Jeong Bo-seok – Dae Jo-yeong; Lee Jin-woo – Hometown Over the Hill	**Yoon Jung-hee** – **A Happy Woman**; Ban Hyo-jung – Hometown Over the Hill; Lee Soo-kyung – Daughters-in-Law; Yang Geum-seok – Dae Jo-yeong, Hometown Over the Hill
Excellence Award, Actor in a Daily Drama	Excellence Award, Actress in a Daily Drama
**Park Hae-jin** – **Heaven & Earth**; Kim Ji-seok – Likeable or Not; Kim Kap-soo – The Innocent Woman; Lee Joo-hyun – Heaven & Earth	**Han Ji-hye** – **Likeable or Not**; Han Hyo-joo – Heaven & Earth; Park So-hyun – The Innocent Woman; Yang Jung-a – Here Comes Ajumma
Excellence Award, Actor in a One-Act/Special/Short Drama	Excellence Award, Actress in a One-Act/Special/Short Drama
**Park In-hwan** – **Drama City "Ugly You"**; **Quoc Tri** – **HDTV Literature "A Time Enjoying Lobster"**; Kang Sung-hae – HDTV Literature "A Dwarf Launches a Little Ball"; Kim Heung-soo – Drama City "Aperture"; Park Hee-soon – Drama City "The Reservoir"	**Jeon Ye-seo** – **Drama City "A Death Messenger With Amnesia"**; **Yoo In-young** – **Drama City "Cho Yong-pil in Our Memories"**; Go Doo-shim – HDTV Literature "A Dwarf Launches a Little Ball"; Son Yeo-eun – Drama City "Watch for the Angel!", HDTV Literature "Castella"; Shin Dong-mi – Drama City "When Her Star Shines"
Best Supporting Actor	Best Supporting Actress
**Im Hyuk** – **Dae Jo-yeong**; **Lee Pil-mo** – **Daughters-in-Law**; Choi Cheol-ho – Dae Jo-yeong; Gong Hyung-jin – Dal-ja's Spring; Kang Nam-gil – Capital Scandal	**Han Go-eun** – **Capital Scandal**; **Kim Hye-ok** – **Daughters-in-Law**; Jo Eun-sook – Hometown Over the Hill, The Innocent Woman; Lee Hye-young – Dal-ja's Spring; Seo Young-hee – Daughters-in-Law
Best New Actor	Best New Actress
**Kim Ji-hoon** – **Daughters-in-Law**; **Kim Ji-seok** – **Likeable or Not**; Jin Yi-han – Conspiracy in the Court; Jo Dong-hyuk – Likeable or Not; Lee Pil-mo – Daughters-in-Law, Here Comes Ajumma; Park Gun-hyung – When Spring Comes	**Lee Soo-kyung** – **Daughters-in-Law**; **Park Min-young** – **I Am Sam**; Han Hyo-joo – Heaven & Earth; Lee Ha-na – When Spring Comes; Seo Young-hee – Daughters-in-Law; Yoo In-young – Likeable or Not
Best Young Actor	Best Young Actress
**Choi Woo-hyuk** – **Capital Scandal**, **Hometown Over the Hill**; Kim Seok – Dae Jo-yeong; Park Jun-mok – Likeable or Not; Baek Seung-do – Drama City "A Small Giant"	**Kim Ye-won** – **The Innocent Woman**; Hong Ah-reum – In-soon Is Pretty; Park Sa-rang – A Happy Woman; Yoon Sun-hye – HDTV Literature "A Time Enjoying Lobster"
Netizen Award, Actor	Netizen Award, Actress
**Choi Soo-jong** – **Dae Jo-yeong**	**Han Ji-min** – **Capital Scandal**
Popularity Award, Actor	Popularity Award, Actress
**Jeong Bo-seok** – **Dae Jo-yeong**	**Han Hyo-joo** – **Heaven & Earth**
Best Couple Award	Best Writer
**Kang Ji-hwan** and **Han Ji-min** – **Capital Scandal**; **Kim Ji-hoon** and **Lee Soo-kyung** – **Daughters-in-Law**; **Park Hae-jin** and **Han Hyo-joo** – **Heaven & Earth**	**Jang Young-chul** – **Dae Jo-yeong**
Congeniality Award	Special Award
**Park Seung-gyu** – **President of the KBS Drama Actors Association**	**Na Sang-yeob** – **Producer, Sayuksin**
Lifetime Achievement Award
**Yang Geun-seung** – **Screenwriter, Love on a Jujube Tree**
