= Lee Soo-kyung (actress, born 1982) =

South Korean actress (born 1982)

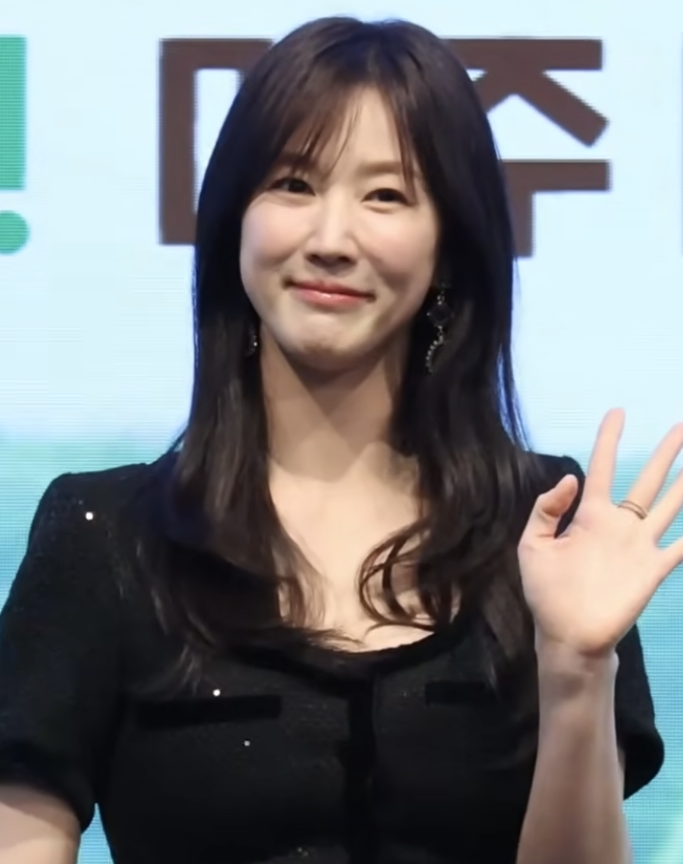
- Lee in March 2026
- Born: March 13, 1982 (age 44); Jungnang District, Seoul, South Korea
- Education: Dongduk Women's University – Broadcasting and Entertainment
- Occupation: Actress
- Years active: 2003–present
- Agents: Snowball Entertainment; Echo Global Group

Korean name
- Hangul: 이수경
- Hanja: 李水京
- RR: I Sugyeong
- MR: I Sugyŏng

Lee Soo-kyung (Korean: 이수경; born March 13, 1982) is a South Korean actress.

== Career ==
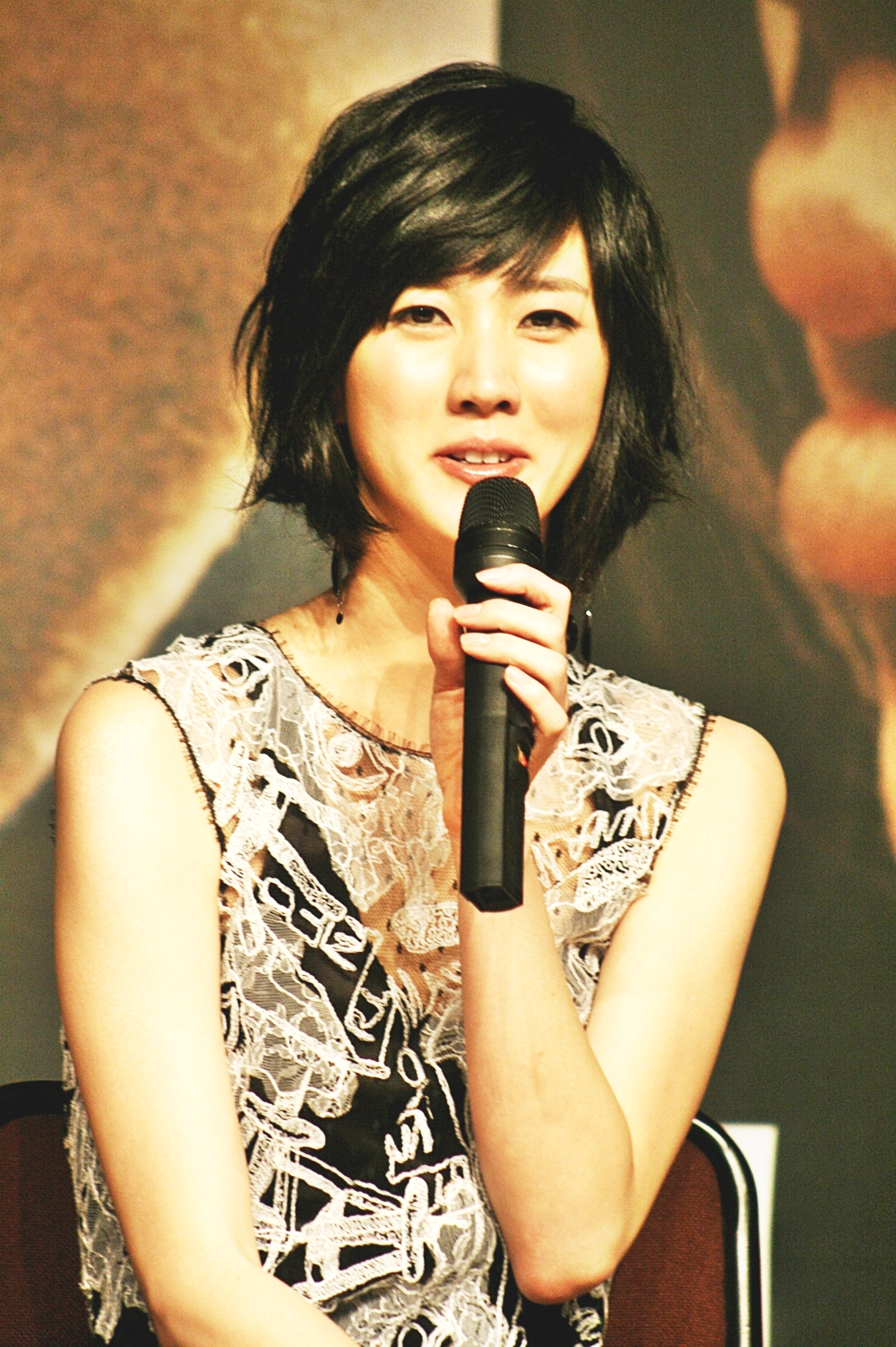
Lee in 2007

She debuted as a commercial model in 2003, then began her acting career by doing supporting roles, notably in Tazza: The High Rollers and Dear Heaven, before being cast in her first leading role in the 2006 sitcom Soulmate. Lee became a household name in 2007 after headlining the hit family drama The Golden Age of Daughters-in-Law. After doing the mystery thriller Rainbow Eyes, and holiday movie Romantic Island, Lee returned to television. She has since starred in the romantic comedy Lawyers of the Great Republic of Korea, surrogacy melodrama Loving You a Thousand Times, and political series Daemul.

In April 2018, Lee signed with new management agency Echo Global Group.

== Filmography ==
=== Television series ===
Year	Title	Role
2003	Span Drama: "Lovers"	
2004	You'll Find Out	Song Na-kyung
2005	Dear Heaven	Gu Seul-ah
2006	MBC Best Theater: "Tongjeong"	Pil-jeong
2006	Soulmate	Soo-kyung
2007	Daughters-in-Law	Jo Mi-jin
2008	Lawyers of the Great Republic of Korea	Woo Yi-kyung
2009	Loving You a Thousand Times	Go Eun-nim
2010	My Country Calls	Oh Ha-na
2010	Big Thing	Jang Se-jin
2011	Can't Lose	Eun Hee-soo (guest, episodes 3-5)
2011	You're Here, You're Here, You're Really Here	Bae Soo-jin
2011	Color of Woman	Hwang Jin-joo
2013	Pots of Gold	Min Sung-eun
2013	Let's Eat	Lee Soo-kyung
2015	A Daughter Just Like You	Ma In-sung
2016	My Little Baby	Han Ye-seul
2016	Bring It On, Ghost	Shin Soo-kyung (guest, episodes 9-10)
2016	Father, I'll Take Care of You	Han Jeong-eun
2018	What's Wrong with Secretary Kim	young Madam Choi
2019	Left-Handed Wife	Oh San-ha
2024	Dog Knows Everything	Kim Si-kyung
2026	Cabbage Your Life	Jo Mi-ryeo

=== Film ===
Year	Title	Role	Notes/Ref.
2005	Wet Dreams 2	Wedding guest who catches the bride's bouquet	
2006	Tazza: The High Rollers	Hwa-ran	
2007	Rainbow Eyes	Cha Su-jin	
2008	Romantic Island	Choi Soo-jin	
2009	Triangle	Han Ji-young	Telecinema
2011	Share the Vision	Min-kyung	4D music video film

=== Variety show ===
Year	Title	Notes/Ref.
2005	Real Romance Love Letter	Contestant
2006	TV Entertainment Tonight	Host
2010	2010 SBS Drama Awards	Host
2011	Diet Survival BIGsTORY	Host
2012	Law of the Jungle W	Cast member
2013	Kim Mi-kyung Show	Co-host
2015	Some Guys, Some Girls	

== Theater ==
Year	Title	Role
2008	Thanks, Honey (여보, 고마워)	

== Discography ==
=== Singles ===
Year	Song title	Notes
2008	"Ocho Ocho (Remake)"	Track from Romantic Island Christmas Story single

== Awards and nominations ==
Year	Award	Category	Nominated work	Result
2007	KBS Drama Awards	Excellence Award, Actress in a Serial Drama	The Golden Age of Daughters-in-Law	Nominated
2007	KBS Drama Awards	Best New Actress	The Golden Age of Daughters-in-Law	Won
2007	KBS Drama Awards	Best Couple Award with Kim Ji-hoon	The Golden Age of Daughters-in-Law	Won
2007	KBS Drama Awards	Popularity Award	The Golden Age of Daughters-in-Law	Nominated
2009	Andre Kim Best Star Awards	Female Star Award	Loving You a Thousand Times	Won
2009	SBS Drama Awards	Excellence Award, Actress in a Serial Drama	Loving You a Thousand Times	Nominated
2009	SBS Drama Awards	Top 10 Stars	Loving You a Thousand Times	Won
2010	SBS Drama Awards	Best Supporting Actress in a Drama Special	Daemul	Won
2010	KBS Drama Awards	Excellence Award, Actress in a Miniseries	My Country Calls	Nominated
2011	SBS Entertainment Awards	Netizen Popularity Award	Bigstory	Nominated
2019	KBS Drama Awards	Excellence Award, Actress in a Daily Drama	Left-Handed Wife	Nominated
