= The Brian =

Studio album by Brian Joo
- Released: December 18, 2006
- Recorded: September – November 2006
- Genres: Soul, jazz, classic pop, dance
- Label: PFull Entertainment

The Brian is the first solo album from Brian Joo (from the R&B duo Fly to the Sky). Originally scheduled for release in November 2006, it was postponed until December 18.

Brian performed two songs from his album, "가지마" (Gajima, "Don't Go") and "바래! 바래!" (Barae! Barae!, "I Wish! I Wish!"), on December 7, 2006 on MNet Countdown, revealing them for the first time. "Gajima" is a slow ballad while "Barae! Barae!" has strong beats. The album incorporates various genres.

Joo performed his first single, "Gajima" (Don't Go), on Mnet Countdown on December 7. He revealed three songs from the album to music website Melon.com. The lead single "Gajima" became one of the most-listened song in various music sites.

== Track listing ==
1. 일년을 겨울에 살아 (Live One Year in Winter)
2. 가지마 (Don't Go)
3. First Date
4. 사랑하지 않으니까요 (Because I Don't Love You)
5. 닮아가기 (Becoming Similar)
6. 하지 말라고
7. 신사 (Gentleman)
8. 검은눈물 (Black Tear)
9. 눈물 속으로 (Into the Tears)
10. 바래! 바래!("I Wish! I Wish!")(Feat.윤동훈(Trespass))
11. All I Know
12. 바래! 바래! (Remix)

== Chart performance ==
Chart	Peak position	Sales total
December 2006 (monthly)	7	19,715
