= Romantic Island =

- Film poster
- Hangul: 로맨틱 아일랜드
- RR: Romaentik aillaendeu
- MR: Romaent'ik aillaendŭ
- Directed by: Kang Chul-woo
- Written by: Lee Jung-sub
- Produced by: Lee Jung-sub; Shin Hyung-chul; Lee Nam-ki; Kevin Kim
- Starring: Lee Sun-kyun; Lee Soo-kyung; Lee Min-ki; Eugene
- Cinematography: Choi Yoon-man
- Edited by: Choi Jae-keun
- Music by: Tearliner
- Distributed by: SBSi; Mirovision
- Release date: December 24, 2008
- Running time: 107 minutes
- Country: South Korea
- Languages: Korean; English; Filipino

Romantic Island (Korean: 로맨틱 아일랜드) is a 2008 South Korean romantic comedy film directed by Kang Chul-woo, starring Lee Sun-kyun, Lee Soo-kyung, Lee Min-ki and Eugene. This film set in Boracay, Philippines.

== Plot ==
Six Koreans from Seoul travel separately to the Philippines: a middle-aged couple on their first trip overseas with the terminally ill husband plotting to kill himself while on holiday so his unsuspecting wife can claim an insurance payment; a convenience store clerk who meets a runaway pop star; and a happy-go-lucky office worker who gets hired as a tour guide by a rich businessman who came to pay his respects to his estranged dead father.

== Cast ==
- Lee Sun-kyun - Kang Jae-hyuk
- Lee Soo-kyung - Choi Soo-jin
- Lee Min-ki - Jung-hwan
- Eugene - Yoo Ga-young
- Lee Moon-sik - Joong-sik
- Lee Il-hwa - Yoon-suk
- Lee Hyun-sook - Soo-jin's mom
- Ki Eun-se - Yoo Hye-ra
- Song Min-ji - Kim Hyun-joo
- Jin Seo-yeon - Sandra
- Choi Dae-sung - manager
- Kim Jong-soo - mover
- Choi Jin-ho - interviewer
