= Over the Rainbow (2006 TV series) =

2006 TV series

- Promotional poster for Over the Rainbow
- Genre: Drama; Music; Romance
- Written by: Hong Jin-ah; Hong Ah-ram
- Directed by: Han Hee
- Starring: Ji Hyun-woo; Seo Ji-hye; Hwanhee; Kim Ok-vin
- Country of origin: South Korea
- Original language: Korean
- No. of episodes: 16

Production
- Producer: Kim Nam-won
- Production locations: South Korea; New Zealand
- Running time: 60 minutes
- Production company: Doremi Media (n/k/a Genie Music)

Original release
- Network: Munhwa Broadcasting Corporation
- Release: July 26 – September 14, 2006

Over the Rainbow (Korean: 오버 더 레인보우) is a 2006 South Korean television series starring Ji Hyun-woo, Seo Ji-hye, Hwanhee, and Kim Ok-vin. It aired on MBC from July 26 to September 14, 2006 on Wednesdays and Thursdays at 21:55 for 16 episodes.

== Synopsis ==
Over the Rainbow is about three people who love to dance. Jeong Hee-su ran away from her father in New Zealand and tried to make a go as a singer in Seoul. She ended up renting a room in Kwon Hyeok-ju's home and helped him realized his talent in dancing. Her main goal was to become famous and for that she turned to the famous singer Rex and dumped her boyfriend Hyeok-ju. Rex didn't mind being used and helped her along even though Hee-su wasn't that talented. Then there was this oddball, Sang-mi, who was a huge fan of Rex. She was poor but full of passion for doing the things she loved. At first, she was despised by everyone but bit by bit she won people over. Hyeok-ju began to develop feelings for her. Things went crazy when Rex started to fall for Sang-mi.

Hyeok-ju and his group, Gangster, are signed on to Pride, the company of which Rex and Hee-su are part of. They are signed on because Rex's popularity is falling because his fans feel that he doesn't have as much passion in his singing as he used to have. Sang-mi was the stylist for Gangster when they were still anonymous, but the president of Pride didn't let her be their stylist anymore, so she instead became Rex's stylist, after an intense scene between Sang-mi and Rex, which Hyeok-ju was not pleased about. Hee-su destroys her own career by singing live, since she cannot sing well, and it is difficult to sing and dance at the same time. She takes pills and is almost in critical condition. Hyeok-ju rushes to the hospital, and Sang-mi follows, and Rex tries to stop her. When she insists on going, he takes her there in his car.

Hyeok-ju and Hee-su reconcile, and Sang-mi walks into the hospital room when they are hugging and Hee-su is crying. She feels like an outsider and leaves, and Rex, seeing her face, takes her to a karaoke place. He sings her his song "Tomorrow" and puts his arm around her while she cries but tries to smile at the same time.

Eventually Rex falls in love with Sang-mi, but Sang-mi is still in love with Hyeok-ju.

== Cast ==
- Ji Hyun-woo as Kwon Hyeok-ju
- Seo Ji-hye as Ma Sang-mi
- Hwanhee as Rex
- Kim Ok-vin as Jeong Hee-su
- Nam Hyun-joon as Manjong
- Choi Kwon as Choi Kyu-ho ("King Mart")
- Shin Hyun-tak as Oh Young-dal
- Yoo Hyun-jae as "Smarty"
- Im Ha-ryong as Kwon Sang-bok
- Kim Hye-ok as Lee Mi-ja
- Na Hye-mi as Kwon Ji-hye
- Park Hee-jin as Ma Sun-young
- Kim Il-woo as Choi Nam-ki
- Lee Hyung-chul as Jeong Sang-hyun
- Jung Han-yong as Mr. Park
- Jung Eun-pyo as Mang-ji
- Jo Sang-gu
