= Daughters-in-Law =

2007 South Korean television series

- Promotional poster
- Also known as: Golden Era of Daughter-in-Law; Daughters-in-Law's Golden Age
- Hangul: 며느리 전성시대
- Hanja: 며느리 全盛時代
- RR: Myeoneuri jeonseongsidae
- MR: Myŏnŭri chŏnsŏngsidae
- Genre: Romance; Drama; Comedy
- Written by: Jo Jung-sun
- Directed by: Jung Hae-ryong KBS Drama Division PD
- Starring: Kim Ji-hoon; Lee Pil-mo; Lee Soo-kyung; Seo Young-hee
- Country of origin: South Korea
- Original language: Korean
- No. of episodes: 54

Production
- Executive producer: Won-Yong Kim (KBS Drama Operations Team)
- Producer: Bae Kyung-soo
- Running time: Saturdays and Sundays 19:55
- Production company: Samhwa Networks

Original release
- Network: KBS2
- Release: 28 July 2007 – 24 January 2008

Daughters-in-Law (Korean: 며느리 전성시대; RR: Myeoneuri jeonseongsidae) is a South Korean drama that aired from July 28, 2007, to January 20, 2008, in Korea by KBS2 starring Kim Ji-hoon, Lee Pil-mo, Lee Soo-kyung and Seo Young-hee. It premiered on KBS2 every Saturday and Sunday at 19:55 for 54 episodes.

The Korean title "며느리 전성시대" can be literally translated to "The Golden Age of Daughters-in-Law". This is an ironic reference to the fact that the traditional role of a Korean daughter-in-law was a life filled with thankless drudgery. This show explores whether modern life and ethos have improved the lives of daughters-in-law in various circumstances with a comedic tone.

== Cast ==
=== Main characters ===
- Kim Ji-hoon as Lee Bok-su

The only son among four sisters, Bok-su is a child in the eyes of his mother. He is the "jang-son" of his family - the oldest son of the oldest son who is expected to carry on his family's legacy, and he feels the weight of that responsibility on his shoulders. Although he is handsome and graduated from the prestigious Seoul National University, he does not hail from a fancy background, as his family owns a pig's feet ("jok-bal") restaurant.

- Lee Soo-kyung as Jo Mi-jin

Mi-jin has such a silly and cute personality that her husband's nickname for her is Dooly. But she is also very ambitious and capable at her job at SOPY Fashion, a clothing design company. She grew up in an affluent family. She meets Bok-su at work, and marries him. Although very independent and modern, she abides by tradition and moves in with his family to live behind the pig's feet restaurant, to the dismay of her mother.

- Lee Pil-mo as Jo In-woo

Mi-jin's older brother. Studied at NYU Stern School of Business, but dropped out and returned to Korea to become a filmmaker. Currently works as a production assistant for a serial drama.

- Seo Young-hee as Lee Bok-nam

Bok-su's younger sister. All her life, she felt overshadowed by her brother. Unlike her new sister-in-law Mi-jin, she doesn't care about her appearance, frequently dressing slovenly, and always wearing her owl-like glasses. Her mother is proud of her, but her grandmother doesn't think any man will marry her. She currently works as a writer for a serial drama where she meets In-woo.

=== Supporting characters ===
Lee family

- Kim Eul-dong as Oh Hyang-sim

Mother of Soo-gil and Myung-hee and Grandmother of Bok-su and Bok-nam. As the matriarch, she handles her family with an iron fist, and everyone lives in fear of her. Although she is a scary mother-in-law, she is wise. Holds the secret recipe for the pig's feet dish that she intends to pass down to her children.

- Park In-hwan as Lee Soo-gil

Father of Bok-su and Bok-nam. Works at the pig's feet restaurant. Lives in fear of his mother Hyang-sim, who he never disobeys. Appears easygoing, but can also have an explosive temper like his mother.

- Youn Yuh-jung as Seo Mi-soon

Served her family and raised her children like a good, traditional daughter-in-law for decades. Very devoted to her son, Bok-su. When Mi-jin becomes her daughter-in-law, she looks forward to ordering Mi-jin around like Hyang-sim ordered her around, but things do not go her way.

Jo family

- Kim Bo-yeon as Yoo In-kyung

Stylish and flamboyant mother of Mi-jin and In-woo. Frequently dresses in mini-skirts and heels, she is a popular "karaoke therapist" for housewives. She is dismayed when her daughter marries into a common family like Bok-su's, and constantly finds them not up to her standard of elegance and luxury. She is also very disappointed by her son for dropping out of business school.

- Lee Young-ha as Jo Minsik

Easygoing and good-humored husband of In-kyung. Quit his corporate job to fulfill his dream of opening a French restaurant. Does not have a problem with his in-laws like his wife does.

Ko family

- Kim Hye-ok as Lee Myung-hee

Daughter of Hyang-sim and sister of Soo-gil. Married into a rich, prestigious family, and uses her status and wealth to get what she wants. Despite her wealth, she takes great pride in how well she serves her husband with meticulous housework and cooking skills. Very disapproving of pretty much everyone. Probably the most abusive mother-in-law in the series and an all-around cold-hearted bitch.

- Yoon Joo-sang as Ko Yeon-joong

Husband of Myung-hee, and father of Joon-myung. An accomplished doctor and the director of a hospital. Although he has a much more easygoing personality than his wife, and loves to laugh, he has somewhat neglected his family over the years due to his focus on his career.

- Jang Hyun-sung as Ko Joon-myung

An only child, he is also a doctor who works at his father's hospital. Fell deeply in love with So-young, who was a nurse, and married her against his mother's wishes. Soyoung left him after a year of marriage because she couldn't take her mother-in-law's abuse. Then Joon-myung marries Soo-hyun. Although he tries to be a good husband to his second wife, he remains very resentful towards his mother.

- Song Seon-mi as Cha Soo-hyun

Joon-myung's second wife, and the daughter of a former university chancellor. Soo-hyun is the head designer of SOPY Fashion, where Bok-su and Mi-jin also work. Soo-hyun's mother died of illness a few years ago and Joon-myung was her doctor. Her husband praises her for having a calm and patient personality. But although Soohyun loves her husband, she comes to realize that his heart is somewhere else.

Extended cast

- Lee Jong-won as Kim Gi-ha

A talented photographer who Soo-hyun hires to work for SOPY Fashion. He has a gruff, sarcastic manner.

- Yeo Woon-kye as Seo Ong-sim

Owns a neighboring restaurant to the Lee family, and loves to gossip. Very curious about the going-ons of her neighbors.

- Kim Mi-kyung as Oh Sang-sook

Employee of SOPY Fashion, and Mi-jin's superior.

- Lee Ha as Noh Seung-yoo

Employee of SOPY Fashion. Recommends that Soo-hyun hire Giha, his friend.

- Sung Eun as Huh Gi-na

A designer at SOPY Fashion who becomes interested in Bok-su because of his good looks and high position in the company, but drops him quickly after discovering that he is the scion of a pig's feet restaurant. Even though she rejected Bok-su, she continues to be jealous when Mi-jin finds happiness with him.

== Awards ==
2007 KBS Drama Awards

- Excellence Award, Actor in a Serial Drama: Jang Hyun-sung
- Best Supporting Actor: Lee Pil-mo
- Best Supporting Actress: Kim Hye-ok
- Best New Actor: Kim Ji-hoon
- Best New Actress: Lee Soo-kyung
- Best Couple Award: Kim Ji-hoon and Lee Soo-kyung

== See also ==
- List of Korean television shows
