= The Accidental Gangster and the Mistaken Courtesan =

- Theatrical release poster
- Directed by: Yeo Kyun-dong
- Written by: Lee Hwa-seong; Yeo Kyun-dong
- Produced by: Cha Seung-jae; Kim Mi-hee
- Starring: Lee Jung-jae; Kim Ok-vin; Kim Suk-hoon
- Cinematography: Choi Hyeon-gi
- Edited by: Jang Seong-ho
- Music by: Kim Tae-seong
- Distributed by: Sidus FNH
- Release date: 3 December 2008 (South Korea)
- Running time: 103 minutes
- Country: South Korea
- Language: Korean
- Box office: $1.4 million

The Accidental Gangster and the Mistaken Courtesan (Korean: 1724 기방난동사건; RR: 1724 gibangnandongsageon) is a 2008 South Korean historical action comedy film. The film depicts the gangster culture of Joseon Korea and is based on an actual fight that occurred at a kisaeng house in 1724. The film was directed by Yeo Kyun-dong, and stars Lee Jung-jae—in his first film role for three years—alongside Kim Ok-vin. Costumes for the film were created by fashion designer André Kim.

== Premise ==
The film is set in Joseon Dynasty Korea, 1724. Cheon-doong, a hoodlum from a small village, meets and falls in love with Seol-ji, a kisaeng at Myeongwolhyang, a luxurious bar. One day he gets into a fight with the head of the Yangjoo gang, but later faces a crisis when the palace decides to crack down on gang activity at Myeongwolhyang. In his pursuit of Seol-ji, Cheon-doong inadvertently incurs the anger of the top-ranking gangster in the area, Man-deuk (Kim Suk Hoon).

== Cast ==
- Lee Jung-jae as Cheon-doong
- Kim Ok-vin as Seol-ji
- Kim Suk-hoon as Man-deuk
- Baek Do-bin as Se-jae
- Yeo Gyoon-dong as Jjak-gwi
- Lee Won-jong as Chil-gab
- Jeong Jae-hyeong as Bong-dal
- Jo Deok-hyeon as Sam Gook-ji
- Lee Won-jae as Excellency Song
- Hong Seok-cheon as tailor shop owner (cameo)

== Release ==
The Accidental Gangster and the Mistaken Courtesan was released in South Korea on 3 December 2008, a day earlier than originally scheduled.
