= Lee Pil-mo =

South Korean actor

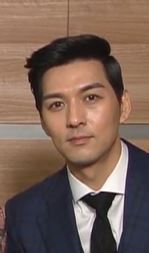
- Lee in 2016
- Born: June 26, 1974 (age 52); Seoul, South Korea
- Occupation: Actor
- Years active: 1999–present
- Agent: PS Entertainment
- Spouse: Seo Soo-yeon (m. 2019)
- Children: 2

Korean name
- Hangul: 이필모
- Hanja: 李必模
- RR: I Pilmo
- MR: I P'ilmo

Lee Pil-mo (born June 26, 1974) is a South Korean actor.

== Personal life ==
In December 2018 K-star Entertainment announced that Lee, who was in an onscreen relationship with the interior designer Seo Soo-yeon on TV Chosun's dating show Taste of Love, would be getting married in Spring 2019.

On February 9, 2019, Lee married Seo Soo-yeon in a private ceremony. All four on-screen brothers from the 2009 KBS drama My Too Perfect Sons were present at the wedding. Actor Son Hyun-joo was the main host of the wedding while Ji Chang-wook and Han Sang-jin were present as well. Lee and his wife welcomed their first child, a son, on August 14, 2019. In February 2022, his wife posted on SNS that she was pregnant with their second child, due for delivery in August 2022.

== Filmography ==
=== Television series ===
Year	Title	Role	Notes/Ref.
2004	Sister-in-Law and Brother-in-Law	Choi Seung-woo	
2004	MBC Best Theater "Love... Stands on the Slopes"	Ahn Seung-woo	
2005	Drama City "Everybody, Cha Cha Cha"	Lee Dong-joon	
2005	Drama City "Go Go Wedding Night"	Kang Bong-soo	
2006	MBC Best Theater "The Taste of Others"	Seo Yoo-jin	
2006	The King of Headbutts	Doctor	
2006	Drama City "Shocking Marriage"	Jang Hyuk	
2006	Drama City "The 108 Men I've Met"	Sung Jin-woo	
2006	As the River Flows	Park Jong-tae	
2006	Here Comes Ajumma	Shim Woo-chan	
2007	Daughters-in-Law	Jo In-woo	
2008	You Are My Destiny	Kim Tae-young	
2009	My Too Perfect Sons	Song Dae-poong	
2010	The Woman Who Still Wants to Marry	Yoon Sang-woo	
2010	Kim Su-ro, The Iron King	Seok Tal-hae	
2011	I Believe in Love	Kim Woo-jin	
2011	KBS Drama Special "Guardian Angel Kim Young-goo"	Kim Young-goo	
2011	Lights and Shadows	Cha Soo-hyuk	
2014	Emergency Couple	Gook Cheon-soo	
2014	Pinocchio	Hwang Gyo-dong	
2015	My Heart Twinkle Twinkle	Jang Soon-chul	
2015	Who Are You: School 2015	Kim Joon-seok	
2015	Ace	Ga Hyung-woo	
2016	Happy Home	Yoo Hyun-gi	
2016	Another Miss Oh	Park Do-kyung's father in flashback	Cameo
2019	Haechi	Han Jeong Seok	
2020	Once Again	Lee Hyun	
2021	The King's Affection	Ye-jong	
2023	Destined With You		
2025	For Eagle Brothers	Oh Jang-Soo	Supporting

=== Web series ===
Year	Title	Role	Notes	Ref.
2022	Work Later, Drink Now	Han Ji-yeon's father	Cameo, Season 2	

=== Film ===
Year	Title	Role
1999	Shiri	North Korean special forces 8th corps
2003	Arirang	Yoon Hyeon-gu
2004	Dance with the Wind	"Handsome"
2010	Lady Daddy	Min-kyu
2011	Secrets, Objects	Duplicator/Homeless person
2013	Superman Kang Bo-sang	Kang Bo-sang
TBA	Dial Girl LEDIEE	Monster No. 17; short film

=== Variety show ===
Year	Title	Notes
2003	Good Night Tonight	
2013	Travel the World: Salaam in Morocco	
2013	Law of the Jungle in New Zealand	Cast member
2014	Answer Me with a Song	
2015	King of Mask Singer	Contestant (Blingbling! Happy New Year)
2018	I Live Alone	
2018	It's Dangerous Beyond the Blankets	Cast Member
2018–2019	Taste of Love	

== Theater ==
Year	Title	Role
pre-2003	The Last Empress	
pre-2003	Oedipus	
pre-2003	Nunsense A-Men	
pre-2003	Strider	
pre-2003	Dancing Dawn	
pre-2003	Lulu	
pre-2003	The Threepenny Opera	
2004	Two Men	
2004	Sunday Seoul	
2008-2009	Really Really Like You	Kang Jin-young
2009	Namhansanseong	Oh Dal-je
2013-2014	The Sound of Music	Captain Georg von Trapp
2016	[Othello], [The Seoul Moon]	
2018-2019	The Days	Cha Jung-hak

== Awards and nominations ==
Year	Award	Category	Nominated work	Result
2007	KBS Drama Awards	Best Supporting Actor	Golden Era of Daughter-in-Law	Won
2007	KBS Drama Awards	Best New Actor	Golden Era of Daughter in Law, Here Comes Ajumma	Nominated
2008	KBS Drama Awards	Excellence Award, Actor in a Daily Drama	You Are My Destiny	Won
2009	7th Korea Visual Arts Festival	Photogenic Award, TV Actor category	My Too Perfect Sons	Won
2009	KBS Drama Awards	Excellence Award, Actor in a Serial Drama	My Too Perfect Sons	Nominated
2009	KBS Drama Awards	Best Couple Award with Yoo Sun	My Too Perfect Sons	Won
2012	MBC Drama Awards	Excellence Award, Actor in a Special Project Drama	Lights and Shadows	Nominated
2016	5th APAN Star Awards	Excellence Award, Actor in a Serial Drama	Happy Home	Won
2017	MBC Drama Awards	Golden Acting Award, Actor in soap operas	Happy Home	Won
