= The Promise (Fly to the Sky album) =

Studio album by Fly to the Sky
- Released: February 3, 2001
- Genre: K-pop; bubblegum pop; hip hop
- Language: Korean
- Label: S.M. Entertainment, Synnara Records
- Producer: Yoo Young-jin

Fly to the Sky chronology
Day By Day (1999)	The Promise (2001)	Sea of Love (2002)

The Promise was the second studio album released by R&B duo Fly to the Sky. Like the debut album, the album included poppy ballads and upbeat dance tracks. Hits from this album includes "The Promise" and "Maybe God Knows." As a bonus track, the remix of "The Promise" is also included in the album. The album peaked at #2, selling more than 200,000 copies in its first month of release. However, it quickly slipped off the charts, falling less than 4,000 copies short of surpassing the chart performance of the duo's debut album. The album features vocal collaboration by Kangta and BoA and songs written by R&B singer Kim Jo-Han.

== Track listing ==
1. 약속 (The Promise)
2. A Confession (고백)
3. What U Want
4. I Want (feat. Kangta and BoA)
5. I Want You I Need You
6. Retry
7. Always Together
8. Maybe God Knows
9. In Your Eyes
10. Crystal (Featuring Jinju)
11. Don't Forget Me
12. Shy Love
13. Baby Love
14. Should I Stay...
15. 약속 (CD Bonus Track, Booty Mix)

== Chart performance ==
Release	Chart	Peak position	Sales total
February 2001	February 2001 Monthly Chart	2	
February 2001	2001 Semi-annual Chart	13	227,001
February 2001	2001 Yearly Chart	29	229,234
