= Hwanhee =

South Korean singer and actor (born 1982)

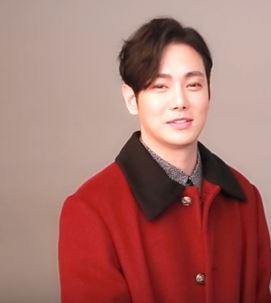
- Hwanhee in 2019

Background information
- Born: Hwang Yoon-seok (황윤석); January 17, 1982 (age 44); Seoul, South Korea
- Genres: K-pop; dance; Korean hip hop; R&B
- Occupations: Singer; actor
- Instrument: Vocals
- Years active: 1999–present
- Labels: SM; PFull; H-Entercom; KeyEast
- Member of: Fly to the Sky
- Website: Hwanhee Official Website (in Korean)

- Korean name
- Hangul: 황윤석
- RR: Hwang Yunseok
- MR: Hwang Yunsŏk

Stage name
- Hangul: 환희
- Hanja: 歡喜
- RR: Hwanhui
- MR: Hwanhŭi

Hwang Yoon-seok (Korean: 황윤석, born January 17, 1982), better known as Hwanhee (환희), is a South Korean singer, actor and a member of South Korean R&B duo Fly to the Sky.

== Career ==
Hwanhee graduated from Gwangmun High School before his debut. He was encouraged to audition by a staff member working for SM Entertainment at his high school festival. He also attended Kyunghee University, majoring in post-modern music.

=== 1999: Fly to the Sky ===
Officially debuting on November 21, 1999, he released the album Day by Day alongside fellow member Brian Joo.

=== 2006-2011: Acting ===
Hwanhee debuted as an actor in 2006, when he starred alongside Seo Ji-hye, Ji Hyun-woo and Kim Ok-vin in Korean drama Over the Rainbow as cocky rock star Rex. The rating of the show was mediocre throughout its airing, plummeting to 7% at one point. His performance received mixed reviews. (SBS)

He continued to pursue his acting career by participating in a 2008 drama "사랑해" ("I Love You") alongside actor Ahn Jae Wook. On 14 September 2008, Hwanhee appeared on the show We Got Married 우리 결혼했어요! together with Hwayobi, as one of the 3 new couples. They made their official exit from the show on January 18, 2009.

In 2010, he acted in a drama called Stormy Lovers. However, due to low ratings, MBC had to cut out about half of the episodes.

Hwanhee also taken part in the movie Star, which was released in late 2011.

=== 2009: Solo ===
In 2009, after releasing their 8th album, Decennium, the group decided its time to focus on their solo career. In December 2009, Hwanhee signed an exclusive acting contract with KEYEAST Co., Ltd (previously known as Boundaries of Forest Entertainment "BOF"). KEYEAST will work with Hwanhee's current recording label, H-Entercom to manage his future acting, advertising, media publicity activities.

In October 2009, Hwanhee released his first solo mini-album "H-Soul". The album, produced by Hwanhee was released on 22 October 2009. After 10 years of performing with Brian as Fly to the Sky, Hwanhee made his comeback as a solo artiste on MBC Music Core on 24 October 2009. His title track from the album was "심장을 놓쳐서" ("Because I Missed Your Heart").

He successfully hold a solo concert in Japan on 23 December 2009, captivating some 2,000 fans at the Japan's JCB Hall with his music. During his solo promotion period in mid December 2009, Hwanhee also participated in the solo album of Song Ji Eun from Secret. He sang a duet with Song Ji Eun. The title song named "어젠" ("Yesterday") was also written by Hwanhee.

On 29 December 2009, Hwanhee's agency (H-Entercom) announced that Hwanhee would take a break from his first solo album's promotional activities due to an abrupt onset of health problems involving his vocal cords. After a hiatus of five months, Hwanhee released a digital duet titled "바보가슴" ("Foolish Heart") with female newcomer singer, 숙희 "Sook Hee" in May 2010. Hwanhee also sang "바람이 되어서라도" ("Even Becoming Wind"), the OST for the highly anticipated Korean war drama, Road No. 1 starring So Ji-sub and Kim Ha-neul.

"내가 더 아플게" ("I Will Hurt More"), a digital single written by Hwanhee was released in July 2010 and it quickly climbed to top of various Korean online music sites. His second mini album "H-Hour", produced by Hwanhee was released on 5 August 2010. The title song of the album is "...하다가" ("...While Doing"). Hwanhee released a digital duet with May Doni titled "남남" ("Strangers") on 29 December 2010.

=== 2010-2011: Studio album and military service ===
Hwanhee was cast in a MBC daily drama, "Stormy Lovers" (previously known as Love is stronger than Death). where he played the role of "Im Hara", a prodigy PD with a playboy attitude. His attitude slowly changed after he met an older woman, Lee Tae Hee. The drama was aired in mid November 2010, after "Golden Fish" ").

Shortly after releasing his 1st album in July 2011, Hwanhee signed on for the production of the movie "Star". As of this writing, the movie is undergoing pre-production. The story will reflect on the life of Romi, portrayed by Hwanhee. Romi is an internationally renowned superstar, and the film will shed some light on the lifestyle and problems such individuals go through during the course of their careers. There is no slated release date at the moment.

On July 28, 2011, Hwanhee released his first official album. He worked with a number of producers and songwriters to make this album. The music video of the title track "죽을 것만 같아" features actor Lee Jang-woo, who is his cousin as well. The original solo arrangement of 어젠 is also included in the album. A few weeks before the release of the album, Hwanhee and H-Entercom agreed to dispose of 20,000 copies of this album due to issues regarding mixing and mastering that did not meet the expectations of the artist.

H-entercom announced that Hwanhee will commence his mandatory military service on 27 October 2011. He served as a public service worker for 23 months after receiving four weeks of basic training at the Nonsan military camp in South Chungcheong Province.

=== 2022: solo concert ===
On November 18, 2022, Hwanhee held his 2022 Hwanhee 'OVER THE SKY' concert on December 17 and 18.

In February 2023, it was announced that Hwanhee would release the single Stay Still, which was set to be released on March 7.

== Discography ==
=== Studio albums ===
Title	Album details	Peak chart positions	Sales
Title	Album details	KOR	Sales
Hwanhee	Released: July 29, 2011; Label: H Entercom; Formats: CD, digital download	5	KOR: 5,697

=== Extended plays ===
Title	Album details	Peak chart positions	Sales
Title	Album details	KOR	Sales
H Soul	Released: October 22, 2009; Label: H Entercom; Formats: CD, digital download	26	
H-Hour	Released: August 5, 2010; Label: H Entercom; Formats: CD, digital download	2	

=== Singles ===
Title	Year	Peak chart positions	Sales (Digital)	Album
Title	Year	KOR	Sales (Digital)	Album
"Because I Missed Your Heart" (심장을 놓쳐서)	2009	—		H Soul
"Foolish Heart" (바보가슴) (with Suki)	2010	19		Non-album single
"I Will Hurt More" (내가 더 아플게)	2010	23		H-Hour
"...While Doing" (...하다가)	2010	22		H-Hour
"Strangers" (남남) (with May Doni)	2010	32		Hwanhee
"Love Pain" (죽을 것만 같아)	2011	16		Hwanhee
"So It Is" (그래)	2017	95		Non-album singles
"The Dawn" (새벽감성)	2018	—		Non-album singles
"Everything" (with Babylon)	2018	—		Non-album singles
"Obvious" (뻔해) (feat. Jung Il-hoon)	2018	—		Non-album singles
"—" denotes release did not chart.

=== Soundtrack appearances ===
Title	Year	Peak chart positions	Sales (Digital)	Album
Title	Year	KOR	Sales (Digital)	Album
"Even Though My Heart Breaks" (가슴 아파도)	2005	—		Fashion 70s OST
"Tomorrow"	2006	—		Over the Rainbow OST
"I Can't Help Missing You" (그리운 건 어쩔 수 없어)	2006	—		Over the Rainbow OST
"I Want U, I Need U"	2006	—		Over the Rainbow OST
"My Person" (내사람)	2008	—		Beethoven Virus OST
"Even Becoming the Wild" (바람이 되어서라도)	2010	9		Road No. 1 OST
"Don't Leave" (가지마)	2011	22		Padam Padam OST
"Only You" (너뿐인걸)	2012	—		Star: Radiant Love OST
"Propose" (프로포즈) (with Kang Yo-han)	2012	—		Star: Radiant Love OST
"Go Away" (가버리라고)	2012	—		Star: Radiant Love OST
"Take It No More"	2012	—		Star: Radiant Love OST
"Heart-breaking" (아프다)	2015	54		Orange Marmalade OST
"Love Is Hurting" (사랑이 아프다)	2016	19		Uncontrollably Fond OST
"Sparkling" (반짝인다)	2017	—		The Emperor: Owner of the Mask OST
"—" denotes release did not chart.

== Filmography ==
=== Television series ===
Year	Title	Role
2006	Over the Rainbow	Rex
2008	I Love You	Park Byung Ho
2010	Stormy Lovers	Im Ha Ra

=== Film ===
Year	Title	Role
2012	Star: Radiant Love	Romi
2015	Five Senses of Love	

=== TV show ===
Year	Title	Notes
2008	We Got Married Season 1	paired with Hwayobi
2014	Immortal Songs 2	Heat of the Saturday Night Special! with Brian Joo Summer Special with Gummy (2014.07.26)
2016	Law of the Jungle	Panama ep 200-202, with Lee Jang-woo
2017	King of Mask Singer	Contestant as "Hoppang Prince" (Episodes 93–100)
