= Fly to the Sky =

South Korean R&B duo

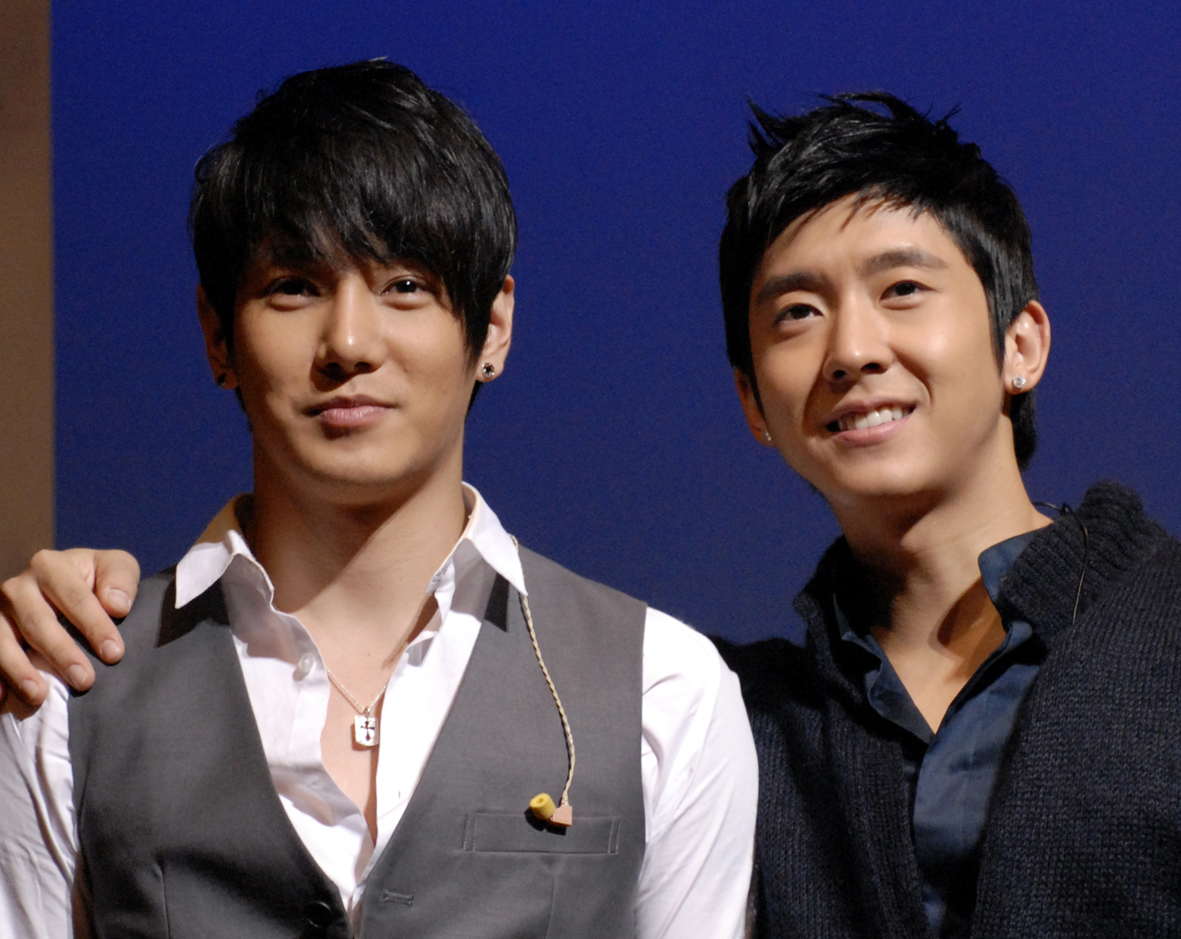
- Fly to the Sky in 2008 (L-R): Hwanhee and Brian Joo

Background information
- Origin: Seoul, South Korea
- Genres: K-pop; R&B
- Years active: 1999–2009; 2014–2019
- Labels: SM Entertainment (1999–2004); PFull Entertainment (2004–2009); H2 Media (2014–present)
- Members: Hwanhee; Brian Joo
- Website: ftts.co.kr

Fly to the Sky (Korean: 플라이 투 더 스카이) is a South Korean R&B duo consisting of Brian Joo and Hwanhee. Initially marketed as K-pop idols, the duo later developed a more mature image and became one of the most popular R&B groups in South Korea. The duo has released nine studio albums since its debut in 1999.

== Musical career ==
=== 1999–2001: Debut and the early years ===
The duo was formed in late 1998 by SM Entertainment. Brian Joo auditioned while he was attending Holy Spirit High School in New Jersey. Hwang Yoon-Suk, later to be known as Hwanhee, was encouraged to audition by a staff member working for the label at his high school festival. Fly to the Sky officially debuted on November 21, 1999, at the LOG-IN H.O.T. Concert and SM Festival Concert '99.

Soon after, the duo released their debut album Day by Day on December 9, 1999, and made their first official television appearance two days later. Unlike their predecessors on their label, popular teen idols at that time, they shied away from upbeat techno and dance music, opting for mid-tempo ballads. The debut became highly successful selling over 250,000 copies. The duo acquired status as the next-generation stars as they won Best New Artist award in 2000. At the same time, the duo failed to rise to instant stardom unlike their predecessors such as H.O.T., whose album sales have passed the one million mark.

Their popularity rapidly climbed with the release of their second album The Promise in 2001, which featured more diverse genres than its predecessor. With more upbeat tracks, it peaked at #2, but quickly disappeared from the charts. In the same year, they held a joint concert with Korean R&B singer Kim Jo-Han.

=== 2002–2004: Musical transition ===
Fly to the Sky - Day by Day (1999)
bubblegum-influenced debut single

Fly to the Sky - Condition of My Heart (2002)
heavy ballad written by Brian McKnight

Fly to the Sky - Like a Man (2006)
the melodramatic title single from their first album under PFull Entertainment

In April 2002, their third album Sea of Love was released while Joo was in New Jersey attending Rutgers University. As a result, Hwang began to perform by himself until Joo returned to Korea. The lead single from the album was the title track, a poppy ballad, and it became a summer hit. Their second single "Condition of my Heart" was written by American singer Brian McKnight; in contrast to the first single, "Condition" was a heavier ballad. The single signaled the duo's musical transition from bubblegum music to R&B. Along with their music, their image began to change as the duo traded in their "flower boy" look for a more masculine image. In the same year, the label released a female duo that was said by fans to complement Fly to the Sky known as Isak N Jiyeon, however the two groups never worked independently with each other.

Their 2003 studio album Missing You featured more tracks that departed from bubblegum music and emphasized their vocal skills for an image as serious artists. Performing commercially well, the album gave the duo many awards including "Bonsang" award from SBS Gayo Daejun and Korea Music Awards. This period is remembered for the highly publicized death of their manager, who was also the manager of BoA, another Korean singer. On a variety show, both members recalled this incident as an emotionally hard time for them. Hwanhee was especially shocked, because he was on the same vehicle with his manager just hours before the incident.

In November 2004, the duo released their fifth and last studio album under SM Entertainment, Gravity. The album received little promotion, and became the duo's lowest-selling studio album, selling just below 90,000 copies. Nevertheless, they held their first official concert successfully in Jamsil Arena on December 21, 2004, and received "Best R&B Artist" award from SBS Gayo Daejun. A controversy rose as critics questioned their eligibility for the award, because the album was released only two months before the show. They challenged the credibility and fairness of SBS Gayo Daejun in its entirety as the artists who boycotted SBS such as YG Family or those who were not present did not receive any awards. They scorned the show as "a party for only those who were present."

The release of their Greatest hits album Eternity in 2005 coincided with the release of the soundtrack of Korean drama Fashion 70s which featured the duo. The popular Korean show made their song "가슴 아파도" ("Although My Heart Aches"), the theme song of the show, an unexpected hit. Eternity is the last Fly to the Sky album released by SM Entertainment.

=== 2004–2006: Leaving SM Entertainment and personal struggles ===
After Fly to the Sky's contract with SM Entertainment expired in November 2004, the duo signed on with PFull Entertainment. The duo stated that they wanted a smaller label that was willing to promote them as musicians and focus less on commercial success. Under this label, Fly to the Sky released their sixth studio album Transition after a year-long hiatus in January 2006. The album became massively successful, selling over 160,000 copies.

The duo embarked on their first nationwide tour, "Fly To The Sky: 2006 The Twice Tour". Starting from Jamsil Arena in Seoul in May 2006, they held concerts in Busan, Daegu, Junju, and Kwangju. Including the number of audiences in the encore concert in Seoul, the tour garnered more than 50,000 people.

To commemorate the success of Transition, Fly To The Sky released a special new edition, which included music videos, deleted scenes and the additional tracks "Hwan Sang (Illusion)," "Hot and Cold," and "When I Say."

In 2004 and 2005, the duo's uncertain future after their contract with SM Entertainment led to a speculation that they would disband. Brian Joo publicly addressed the rumours on SBS show "Yah Shim Man Man," which aired on July 10. He admitted that the two had difficulties in the early days of their career and said that he had been troubled by feelings of inferiority to Hwanhee, because he received more attention and praise than him. Despite their status as a duo, he felt that he was not given his due or the same amount of attention as Hwanhee. Eventually he found this difficult to bear, and suggested to him that they pursue their separate paths. Hwanhee responded angrily and the matter escalated into a serious fight nearly leading to disbandment. The two reconciled soon after, and said they "grew to better understand each other and realized that they both needed each other." Afterwards, the pair decided to try to better understand each other in order to solve their problems together and to support each other. After reflecting on this incident, Joo's eyes were brimming with tears.

Since 2006, the duo has been seen frequently on variety shows and pursued individual careers. Hwanhee appeared on Korean television drama "Over the Rainbow" during summer of 2006, and Joo released his solo album The Brian in December 2006. As they appeared more often on non-music programs, the duo saw an increase in their popularity and backlash from critics at the same time as they felt the duo were compromising their image as artists.

=== 2007–2009: Return to prominence and solo projects ===
The duo's seventh album No Limitations was released on July 4, 2007. Their first television performance to promote the album was on June 29, 2007. Popular tracks that are included in the album are "Oneuldo Eebbeungul," ("오늘도 이쁜걸" Pretty Today Too) "Geuraedo Sarangipnida," ("그래도 사랑입니다" It's still love) and "Gee-uk Han Joom" ("기억 한 줌" Grain of Memory), as well as "My Angel", which peaked at #1 on many on- and offline charts. No Limitations became the duo's first number one album. Decennium (2009) became the group's final album, with the duo stating that they will not renew their contract and will go their separate ways professionally. As of 2009, Hwanhee and Brian have released their respective first and second solo albums. Hwanhee has also participated in the production of Song Ji Eun's solo single "Yesterday" and also features in the title track.

=== 2014: Comeback after five years on hiatus ===
On April 14, 2014, Brian Joo announced on his Twitter that Fly to the Sky will be making their comeback in May. The band later signed up with H2 Media, the agency of member Hwanhee. Their ninth new album Continiuum has been released and the main title track is "You You You". The single peaked at number one on Gaon digital chart.

In June, the duo releases a music video titled "Years Apart" as a theme song for the movie No Tears for the Dead.

Although being on hiatus for 5 years, Hwanhee and Brian expressed their good teamwork and solid friendship in an interview, telling "There were rumors about us being gay and liking men, but it’s not like that. We’re that close so people feel that way about us”.

== Musical style ==
The duo's debut single "Day by Day" was a light bubblegum love song. Their subsequent songs were a combination of R&B, pop rap, and hip-hop until 2002, when the duo abandoned bubblegum pop. Since 2002, they opted for a blend of heavy R&B and Korean pop. They continue to sing love songs, and some of them continue to incorporate hip-hop and rap from Joo.

The duo differs in their taste of music. Producer of Transition, Hwang Se-Jun, has said Hwanhee prefers pure R&B while Brian likes music with distinct beats and has a strong liking for rap. Despite his passion, their 2006 studio album Transition does not feature any. Brian predicts that there will no longer be any opportunity to include his rap in their album, and dislikes "being generalized as a duo comprised of one rapper and one vocalist." He lamented the waning popularity of hip-hop in South Korea where "hip-hop is merely labeled as dance music in Korea."

== Criticisms ==
Prior to the duo's transition to R&B, critics were displeased as despite being promoted as serious artists that appeal to older audiences, they felt that the duo was no different from other popular teen idols at that time. In a lengthy interview with music review site "52street", the site described the duo in the early years as, "trendy hairstyle, thick make-up, and flashy dance moves."

As their career matured, critics have pointed that Fly to the Sky has yet to find their own style. The duo has been criticized for lack of creative control over their works and relying heavily on composers whose distinct styles overpower their vocals. During their career they have written lyrics for four songs in albums Gravity and No Limitations. Music critic Shin Hye Rim says,

Ironically, Fly to the Sky's sixth album Transition, which means change or transformation, shows no significant improvement. Despite that this album is their first step under their new label, the album almost turns out just the way we have predicted. Fany's thick tone color and Brian's clean-cut voice fuse to make music that spits out sorrow. That's about it.

Their appearances at variety shows were met with scrutiny as the duo were seen frequently outside of music programs during 2006. They were one of many artists who hopped on a bandwagon to promote their albums by appearing comical on variety shows. Critics compared this choice to a double-edged sword; while they gained more publicity and a more viewer-friendly image, they were compromising their image as professional artists. From January to February 2006, Seoul YWCA conducted a research to study variety shows that air from 6PM to 8PM. The research concluded that "variety shows star the same celebrities and air similar content." The article listed celebrities who frequent those shows, of which Joo was one of them. He appeared in television shows of three major broadcasting networks of Korea during the same time slot on January 6 and January 29.

== Awards and nominations ==
Golden Disc Awards

Year	Category	Nominated work	Result	Ref.
2003	Main Prize (Bonsang)	"Missing You"	Won	
2006	Main Prize (Bonsang)	"Like a Man"	Won	

Mnet Asian Music Awards

Year	Category	Work	Result	Ref.
2000	Best New Group	"Day By Day"	Nominated	
2000	Best R&B Performance	"Day By Day"	Nominated	
2001	Best R&B Performance	"The Promise" (약속)	Nominated	
2002	Best R&B Performance	"My Heart"	Nominated	
2003	Best R&B Performance	"Missing You"	Won	
2006	Best R&B Performance	"Like a Man"	Won	
2007	Best R&B Performance	"My Angel"	Nominated	

SBS Gayo Daejeon

Year	Category	Nominated work	Result	Ref.
2000	Rookie Award	—N/a	Won	
2002	R&B Award	—N/a	Won	
2003	Main Prize (Bonsang)	—N/a	Won	
2004	R&B Award	—N/a	Won	
2006	Main Prize (Bonsang)	—N/a	Won	

=== Other awards ===
Year	Award	Category	Nominated work	Result	Ref.
2003	Seoul Music Awards	Main Prize (Bonsang)	—N/a	Won	
2006	Korean Fashion World Awards	Best Dressed Singer	—N/a	Won	
2014	Melon Music Awards	R&B/Soul Award	"You You You"	Won	

== Discography ==
Full albums

- Day By Day (1999)
- The Promise (2001)
- Sea of Love (2002)
- Missing You (2003)
- Gravity (2004)
- Transition (2005)
- No Limitations (2007)
- Decennium (2009)
- Continuum (2014)
- Fly High (2019)

Extended plays

- Love & Hate (2015)
- Your Season (너의 계절) (2017)
