= Brian Joo =

American musician (born 1981)

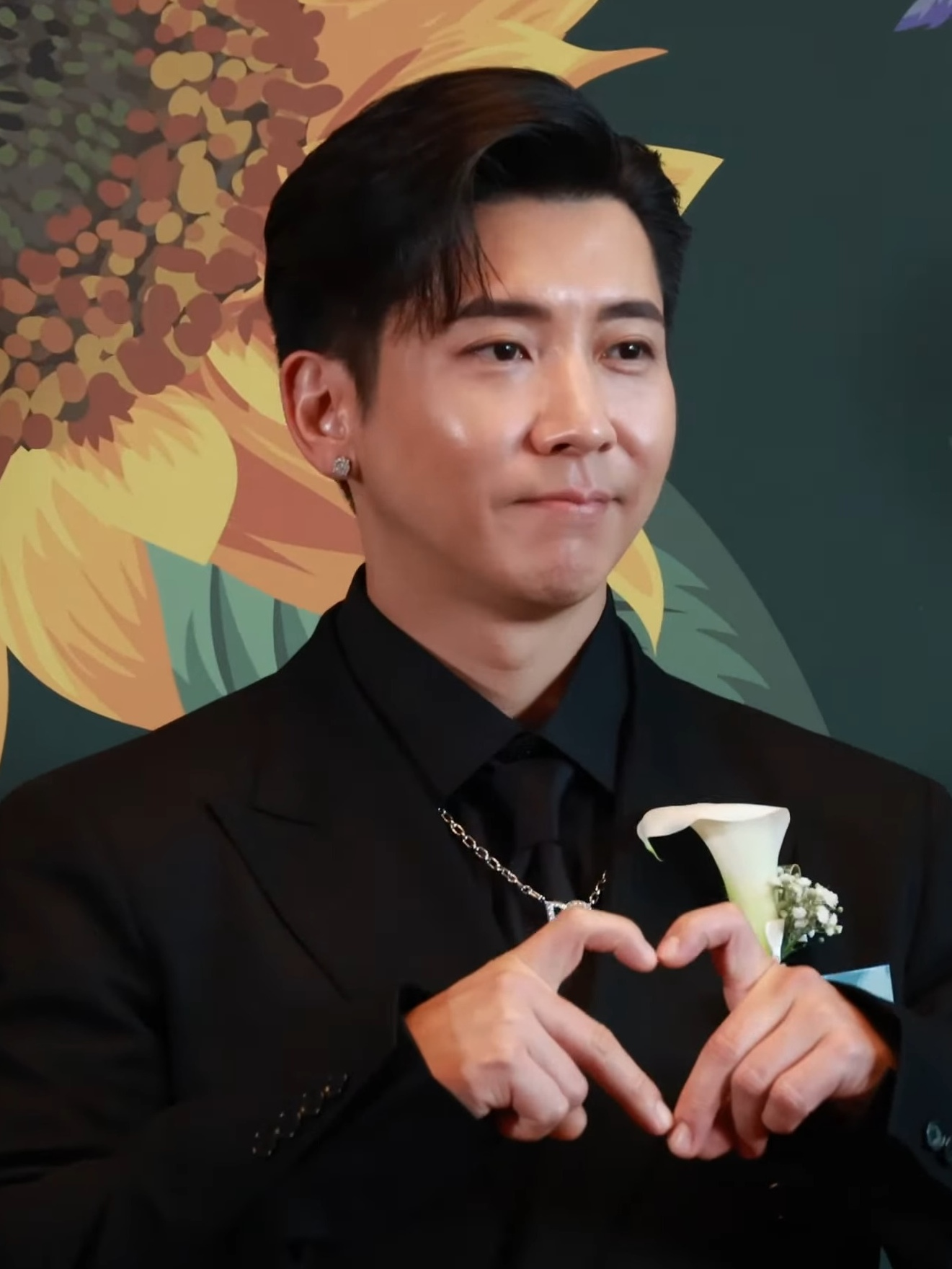
- Joo in 2024

Background information
- Born: January 10, 1981 (age 45); California, United States
- Origin: New Jersey, United States
- Genres: K-pop; R&B; gospel
- Occupations: Singer; songwriter; actor; television host
- Instruments: Vocals; piano; keyboards; drums
- Years active: 1999–present
- Labels: SM; PFull; Jellyfish; iMe Korea
- Member of: Fly to the Sky

Korean name
- Hangul: 주민규
- RR: Ju Mingyu
- MR: Chu Min'gyu

Former name
- Hangul: 주진택
- RR: Ju Jintaek
- MR: Chu Chint'aek

Brian Joo (born January 10, 1981), better known professionally as Brian (Korean: 브라이언), is an American singer and one-half of the R&B duo Fly to the Sky. His first solo album, The Brian was released in December 2006. His second solo album, Manifold was released in December 2009.

== Early life and education ==
Brian Joo was born on January 10, 1981, in Los Angeles, California to South Korean immigrant parents. His original Korean name was Joo Jin-taek (주진택), but his father changed it to Joo Min-gyu (주민규) when he was three years old. Joo grew up in New Jersey and spoke Korean at home. His parents worked at casinos in Atlantic City and his brother, Jason Joo, is an officer in the U.S. Navy.

While attending Holy Spirit High School, a friend signed him up for an audition with Brothers Entertainment without Joo's knowledge. The company has discovered several Korean-Americans who wish to pursue an entertainment career in South Korea. After several months of training, he was sent to SM Entertainment in South Korea, and on December 9, 1999, made his debut as one of the two members of Fly to the Sky, along with Hwanhee, at the age of 17.

Joo was accepted to Rutgers University, but did not end up attending due to the demands of his music career. He later enrolled in Dongguk University, where he graduated from the Department of Theatre and Film.

== Fly to the Sky ==
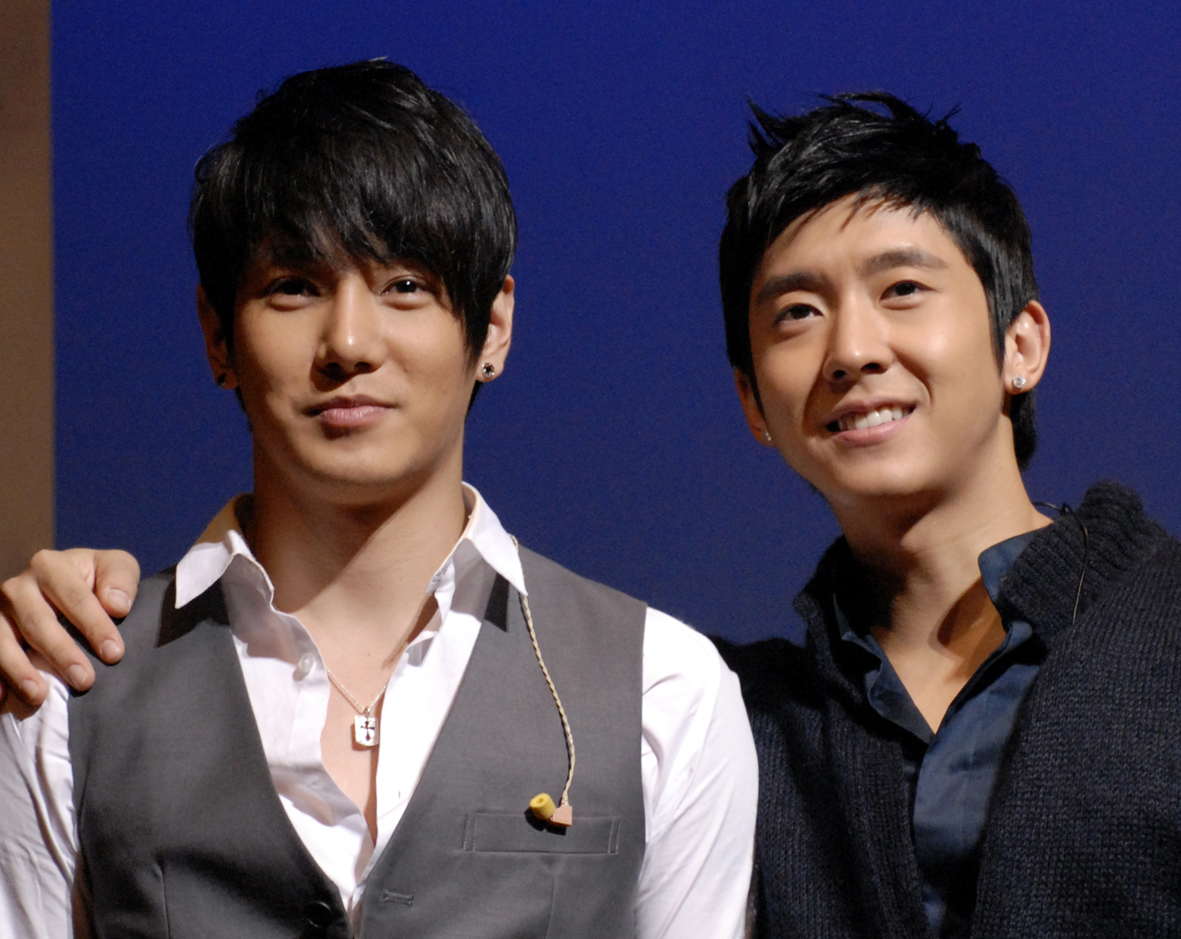
Joo (right) with Hwanhee as Fly to the Sky, 2008.

Joo is a member of Fly to the Sky with Hwanhee, Brian sang and also rapped. As Fly to the Sky made its musical transition from bubblegum pop to heavy R&B, Joo felt discontent and inferior, and felt that Hwanhee was more appreciated for his vocal skills.

Joo has appeared on television many times. Since 2005, he has appeared on a number of variety shows, including hosting MBC's Music Core in 2006 and becoming a host for SBS' Green Gold in 2009.

In August 2009, Fly to the Sky decided to work on separate projects and have become solo singers under different labels.

On April 14, 2014, Brian Joo announced on his Twitter that Fly to the Sky will be making their comeback in May. The band later signed up with H2 Media, the agency of member Hwanhee. Their 9th new album "Continiuum" has been released and the main title track is "You You You". The single peaked at number one on Gaon digital chart.

Although being on hiatus for five years, Hwanhee and Brian expressed their good teamwork and solid friendship in an interview, telling "There were rumors about us being gay and liking men, but it's not like that. We're that close so people feel that way about us".

== Solo career ==
=== 2006-2008: Show! Music Core and solo debut with The Brian ===
In May 2006, Joo became a co-host of Show! Music Core alongside actress Jang Mi-inae. Later that year, he won the Popularity Award at the 2006 MBC Entertainment Awards for his work on the show.

Joo released his debut solo album, The Brian, on December 18, 2006. The album incorporated diverse genres such as soul and jazz. With the album, Joo said he hoped to gain more respect as an artist, rather than being known as "Fly to the Sky without Hwanhee". He described one of his motivations for making a solo album:

Many people think Hwanhee is the main vocalist [of Fly to the Sky] and I am the second vocalist or rapper. I won't mention his name, but one producer once said to Hwanhee after a performance, "You're truly a great singer", when he only said, "Good job", to me. So I wanted to prove that I could do it too.

The album debuted at #7 on the monthly Recording Industry Association of Korea album chart and sold 15,376 copies by the end of December. The album's lead single, a ballad titled "Don't Go", topped various South Korean real-time music charts upon its release and was awarded first place on Inkigayo on January 21. While promoting the album, Joo was diagnosed with vocal cord nodules and had to adjust his schedule to avoid further injury.

Joo left his position on Show! Music Core in November 2007 to focus on overseas promotions.

=== 2009-2012: Manifold, Unveiled, and musical theater ===
On December 10, 2009, Joo released his second solo album, Manifold, which sold 15,000 pre-order copies. The album was a departure from Joo's earlier work and featured hip hop and dance music songs, including the lead single "My Girl" featuring hip hop duo Supreme Team.

Joo signed an exclusive contract with Jellyfish Entertainment in October 2010.

On April 7, 2011, Joo released his first mini album, Unveiled, including for its lead single an emotional ballad titled "Love Is Over Now". Unveiled debuted at #7 on the Gaon Album Chart. To promote the album, Joo went on a solo tour of the United States in June 2011 with stops in Seattle, Atlanta, Los Angeles, and New York.

Upon returning to South Korea, Joo made his musical theater debut in August in a Seoul production of Rent, in which he played the role of Mark. In 2012 at the Shrine Auditorium in Los Angeles, California, Joo performed as a principal cast member representing the Korean culture in a Broadway-style musical called Loving the Silent Tears and based on Supreme Master Ching Hai's poetry collection to commemorate the 19th Anniversary of Supreme Master Ching Hai Day.

== Discography ==
=== Studio albums ===
Title	Album details	Peak chart positions	Sales
Title	Album details	KOR	Sales
The Brian	Released: December 18, 2006; Label: PFull Entertainment; Formats: CD, cassette; Track listing: 1. 일 년을 겨울에 살아(Living One Year in Winter); 2. 가지마 (Don't Go); 3. First Date; 4. 사랑하지 않으니까요(Because I Don't Love You); 5. 닮아 가기(Becoming Similar); 6. 하지 말라고; 7. 신사(Gentleman); 8. 검은 눈물(Black Tear); 9. 눈물 속으로(Into the Tears); 10. 바래! 바래! (I Want! I Want!) (feat. 윤동훈 Trepass); 11. All I know 12. 바래! 바래! (I Want! I Want!) (Remix)	— (Note: The Brian peaked at #7 on the Recording Industry Association of Korea's monthly album chart.)	KOR: 19,715
Manifold	Released: December 10, 2009; Label: On Point Entertainment; Formats: CD, digital download; Track listing: 1. Dreaming; 2. 내 여자 (My Girl) (feat. Supreme Team); 3. One Step; 4. Erase; 5. Tell Me Baby (feat. Day Day of Dalmatian); 6. Lock Me Up; 7. Bullet; 8. Move It; 9. 친구의 여자를 사랑했네 (A Friend's Girl I Loved) (feat. Tablo & Mithra Jin); 10. 눈물이 마르면... (Tears Run Dry); 11. Do It (Move It English Ver.); 12. Tears Run Dry (눈물이 마르면... English Ver.); 13. Bullet (English Ver.)	9	KOR: 15,000

=== Extended plays ===
Title	Album details	Peak chart positions	Sales
Title	Album details	KOR	Sales
Unveiled	Released: April 7, 2011; Label: Jellyfish Entertainment; Formats: CD, digital download; Track listing: 1. Domino (눈물의 구성요소); 2. Love Is Over Now (사랑하다 끝났어); 3. Wish You Were Mine (나도 약속이 있었으면 좋겠다); 4. 24; 5. Song 4 U 6. Domino (English version); 7. Love Is Over Now (English version); 8. Love Is Over Now (Instrumental); 9. Shine. (On Your Heart_ 단편영화 "출발" OST) (Physical Only) [Bonus Track]	7	KOR: 4,466
ReBorn Part 1	Released: January 26, 2012; Label: Jellyfish Entertainment; Formats: CD, digital download; Track listing: 1. Let This Die (너 따윈 버리고) (feat. Tiger JK); 2. Can't Stop (feat. Jay Park, Beenzino); 3. Don't Tell Me I'm Wrong (Duet with Jade Valerie); 4. Let This Die (Extended English version) (feat. Flowsik); 5. Can't Stop (English version) (feat. Jay Park, Dumbfoundead); 6. Domino (Acoustic version); 7. Let This Die (Instrumental)	8	KOR: 2,596

== Filmography ==
=== Television shows ===
Year	Title	Role	Ref.
2006–2007	Show! Music Core	Host	
2009	Strong Heart	Regular guest	
2014	Welcome Back to School	Regular cast	
2021	Cooking - The Birth of a Cooking King	Contestant	
2023	Cleaning Freak Brian	Host	

=== Television series ===
Year	Title	Role	Ref.
2011	The Greatest Love	Kang-min (cameo)	
2015	My Beautiful Bride	Chaebol man (cameo)	
2018	Yeonnam-dong 539	Lion	

=== Web series ===
Year	Title	Role	Ref.
2018	No Choice But to Meet You	Brian	
2024–2025	BYOB	Host	

=== Radio shows ===
Year	Title	Role	Ref.
2022	'K-Pop Connection	Special DJ	
