= List of 2012 box office number-one films in South Korea =

This is a list of films which placed number-one at the South Korean box office during 2012.

== Number-one films ==
†	This implies the highest-grossing movie of the year.

#	Date	Film	Gross
1	January 8, 2012	Mission: Impossible – Ghost Protocol	$3,831,245
2	January 15, 2012	Puss in Boots	$4,544,243
3	January 22, 2012	Dancing Queen	$3,418,494
4	January 29, 2012	Unbowed	$4,754,636
5	February 5, 2012	Nameless Gangster: Rules of the Time	$6,467,355
6	February 12, 2012	Nameless Gangster: Rules of the Time	$5,866,826
7	February 19, 2012	Howling	$3,533,526
8	February 26, 2012	Nameless Gangster: Rules of the Time	$2,495,421
9	March 4, 2012	Love Fiction	$4,017,248
10	March 11, 2012	Helpless	$4,240,711
11	March 18, 2012	Helpless	$3,900,489
12	March 25, 2012	Architecture 101	$3,839,949
13	April 1, 2012	Architecture 101	$3,876,617
14	April 8, 2012	Architecture 101	$3,079,866
15	April 15, 2012	Battleship	$4,487,425
16	April 22, 2012	Battleship	$3,482,543
17	April 22, 2012	The Avengers	$10,792,833
18	May 6, 2012	The Avengers	$10,683,493
19	May 13, 2012	The Avengers	$7,314,419
20	May 20, 2012	The Avengers	$4,074,632
21	May 27, 2012	Men in Black 3	$8,074,440
22	June 3, 2012	Men in Black 3	$3,797,611
23	June 10, 2012	The Concubine	$3,393,012
24	June 17, 2012	The Concubine	$2,472,604
25	June 24, 2012	Miss Conspirator	$1,720,789
26	July 1, 2012	The Amazing Spider-Man	$10,904,887
27	July 8, 2012	The Amazing Spider-Man	$7,851,008
28	July 15, 2012	Deranged	$7,280,644
29	July 22, 2012	The Dark Knight Rises	$12,946,284
30	July 29, 2012	The Thieves †	$12,859,489
31	August 5, 2012	The Thieves †	$13,287,926
32	August 12, 2012	The Thieves †	$7,526,259
33	August 19, 2012	The Thieves †	$5,460,631
34	August 26, 2012	The Neighbor	$5,295,570
35	September 2, 2012	The Traffickers	$3,633,099
36	September 9, 2012	The Bourne Legacy	$3,457,222
37	September 16, 2012	Masquerade	$7,313,393
38	September 23, 2012	Masquerade	$7,877,673
39	September 30, 2012	Masquerade	$9,200,274
40	October 7, 2012	Masquerade	$5,629,291
41	October 14, 2012	Masquerade	$4,446,804
42	October 21, 2012	Masquerade	$3,562,776
43	October 28, 2012	Skyfall	$5,925,335
44	November 4, 2012	A Werewolf Boy	$6,837,109
45	November 11, 2012	A Werewolf Boy	$8,723,686
46	November 18, 2012	The Twilight Saga: Breaking Dawn – Part 2	$5,888,515
47	November 25, 2012	A Werewolf Boy	$3,607,400
48	December 2, 2012	26 Years	$4,585,252
49	December 9, 2012	26 Years	$4,177,574
50	December 16, 2012	The Hobbit: An Unexpected Journey	$7,234,239
51	December 23, 2012	The Hobbit: An Unexpected Journey	N/A
52	December 30, 2012	The Tower	$5,959,582

== Highest-grossing films ==
Highest-grossing films of 2012 (by admissions)
Rank	Title	Country	Admissions	Domestic gross
1.	The Thieves	South Korea; Hong Kong	12,983,182	US$82.1 million
2.	Masquerade	South Korea	12,319,390	US$77.9 million
3.	The Avengers	United States	7,074,867	US$52.2 million
4.	A Werewolf Boy	South Korea	6,654,390	US$40.8 million
5.	The Dark Knight Rises	United States; United Kingdom	6,396,528	US$41.7 million
6.	The Grand Heist	South Korea	4,909,937	US$30.3 million
7.	The Amazing Spider-Man	United States	4,853,123	US$36.1 million
8.	Nameless Gangster: Rules of the Time	South Korea	4,719,872	US$32 million
9.	All About My Wife	South Korea	4,598,821	US$30 million
10.	Deranged	South Korea	4,515,833	US$28.2 million

Highest-grossing domestic films of 2012 (by admissions)
Rank	Title	Admissions	Domestic gross
1.	The Thieves	12,983,182	US$82.1 million
2.	Masquerade	12,319,390	US$77.9 million
3.	A Werewolf Boy	6,654,390	US$40.8 million
4.	The Grand Heist	4,909,937	US$30.3 million
5.	Nameless Gangster: Rules of the Time	4,719,872	US$32 million
6.	All About My Wife	4,598,821	US$30 million
7.	Deranged	4,515,833	US$28.2 million
8.	Architecture 101	4,111,068	US$26.5 million
9.	Dancing Queen	4,058,225	US$26.4 million
10.	Unbowed	3,451,025	US$22.7 million

== See also ==
- List of South Korean films of 2012
