= Moon-soo =

- Hangul: 문수
- RR: Munsu
- MR: Munsu

Moon-soo is a Korean given name.

People with this name include:

- Park Mun-su (1691–1756), Joseon Dynasty secret royal inspector under King Yeongjo
- Kim Moon-soo (politician) (born 1951), South Korean politician, 32nd governor of Gyeonggi Province
- Kim Moon-soo (badminton) (born 1963), South Korean badminton player

Fictional characters with this name include:

- Munsu, in South Korean-Japanese comic Blade of the Phantom Master
- Mun-su, in 2003 South Korean film Please Teach Me English
- Mun-su, in 2008 South Korean film Public Enemy Returns
- Jung Moon-soo, in 2011 South Korean television series Sign
- Moon-soo, in 2012 South Korean film In Another Country
- Park Moon-soo, in 2012 South Korean television series History of a Salaryman
- Park Moon-soo, in 2013 South Korean television series Bel Ami
- Jang Moon-soo, in 2014 South Korean television series God's Gift: 14 Days

== See also ==
- List of Korean given names
