= Ms. Hammurabi =

2018 South Korean television series

- Promotional poster
- Also known as: Miss Hammurabi
- Hangul: 미스 함무라비
- RR: Miseu Hammurabi
- MR: Misŭ Hammurabi
- Genre: Legal drama
- Based on: Miss Hammurabi by Moon Yoo-seok
- Written by: Moon Yoo-seok
- Directed by: Kwak Jung-hwan
- Starring: Go Ara; Kim Myung-soo; Sung Dong-il
- Composer: Choi Chul-ho
- Country of origin: South Korea
- Original language: Korean
- No. of episodes: 16

Production
- Executive producers: Ham Young-hoon; Jang Kyung-ik; Kim Woo-taek
- Producers: Kim Da-yea; Kwon Ji-young; Park Woo-ram; Shin Yoon-ha
- Production company: Studio&NEW

Original release
- Network: JTBC
- Release: May 21 – July 16, 2018

Ms. Hammurabi (Korean: 미스 함무라비) is a 2018 South Korean television series written by Moon Yoo-seok, the chief judge of Seoul Eastern District Court, and starring Go Ara, Kim Myung-soo, and Sung Dong-il. It is based on the screenwriter's own novel of the same name, which was first serialized in 2015 on The Hankyoreh and was later published in paperback form in 2016 by Munhakdongne Publishing Group. It aired on JTBC from May 21 to July 16, 2018, every Monday and Tuesday at 23:00 (KST) for 16 episodes.

The series was well received by viewers for its fresh perspective on judges, as well as its honest depiction of adversities in modern-day Korean society.

== Synopsis ==
The series tells the story of the life of judges and the various disputes that they have to settle.

== Cast ==
=== Main ===
- Go Ara as Park Cha Oh-reum, a passionate and idealistic rookie judge who stays by her beliefs and stands for justice.
- Kim Myung-soo as Lim Ba-reun, an elite judge who prioritizes principles and sticks to the rules.
- Sung Dong-il as Han Se-sang, a down-to-earth chief judge with years of experience and knowledge who understands the harsh realities of life.
- Ryu Deok-hwan as Jung Bo-wang, an elite judge from Department 43, beside Department 44, who knows almost everything about everyone.
- Lee Elijah as Lee Do-yeon, a stenographer for Department 44 who has a secret nighttime job.

=== Supporting ===
- Lee Tae-sung as Min Yong-joon
- Lee Jae-woo as Judge Cheon Seong-hoon
- Ahn Nae-sang as Chief presiding judge
- Cha Soon-bae as Sung Gong-choong
- Lee Won-jong as Bae Gong-dae
- Kim Hong-fa as Chief Judge
- Lee Cheol-min as Maeng Sa-sung
- Yum Ji-young as Yoon Ji-young
- Lee Yea-eun as Lee Dan-di
- Kim Bo-yoon as Han Seo-yeon
- Kim Ji-sung as Kim Da-in
- Kim Hyun as Park Cha-oh Reum's aunt
- Kim Young-ok as Oh-reum's grandmother
- Park Sun-cheon as Lim Ba-reum's mother
- Ko In-beom as Lim Ba-reum's father
- Cha Soo-yeon as Hong Eun-ji
- Lee Kan-hee as Park Cha Oh-reum's mother
- Hong Hee-woon as Lawyer Go Jin-tae
- Kim Wook as Lee Ga-on
- Son Ji-yoon as Lee Myung-soo's wife

== Production ==
- Ms. Hammurabi was planned to be 100% pre-produced.
- This series reunites Sung Dong-il and Go Ara who previously worked together in Reply 1994 (2013) and Hwarang: The Poet Warrior Youth (2016).
- The first script reading of the cast was held on January 16, 2018.

== Original soundtrack ==
Ms.Hammurabi OST

Soundtrack album by Various artists
- Recorded: 2018
- Genre: Soundtrack
- Languages: Korean; English
- Labels: Music & New; Studio & New

=== Part 1 ===
Released on May 21, 2018
No.	Title	Artist	Length
1.	"Like that day" (그날처럼)	Hwang Seon-ho	4:22
2.	"Like that day" (Inst.)		4:22
Total length:			8:44

=== Part 2 ===
Released on May 28, 2018
No.	Title	Artist	Length
1.	"Everyday with you" (일상그리고너)	Illuwa band	3:59

=== Part 3 ===
Released on June 4, 2018
No.	Title	Artist	Length
1.	"Someday, Somehow" (언젠가어띻게든)	U-Mb5 (ft.Hodge)	4:26
2.	"Someday, Somehow" (Inst.)		4:26
Total length:			8:42

=== Part 4 ===
Released on June 11, 2014
No.	Title	Artist	Length
1.	"You are the apple of my eye" (내눈의사과입녀다)	U-Mb5 (ft.Sam Carter)	3:49

=== Part 5 ===
Released on June 25, 2014
No.	Title	Artist	Length
1.	"Ususu" (우수수)	Haru	4:39

Disc 2:
No.	Title	Artist	Length
1.	"Code of Hammurabi" (Opening Title)	Various Artists	3:03
2.	"Amor Fati"	Various Artists	3:48
3.	"Book Store"	Various Artists	2:46
4.	"Cider Attack"	Various Artists	1:55
5.	"Hello"	Various Artists	3:04
6.	"Miss Hammurabi"	Various Artists	4:12
7.	"Melody of star crossed lovers"	Various Artists	2:42
8.	"Melody of star crossed lovers (Piano ver.)"	Various Artists	5:31
9.	"Misstic"	Various Artists	3:48
10.	"Season of Star"	Various Artists	3:08
11.	"The Typewriter"	Various Artists	2:21
12.	"Tears of a City"	Various Artists	2:33

== Viewership ==
Ms. Hammurabi : South Korea viewers per episode (thousands)

Season	Episode number																Average
Season	1	2	3	4	5	6	7	8	9	10	11	12	13	14	15	16	Average
1	782	1124	1181	1071	1056	1165	1025	1133	1004	867	840	818	699	928	1155	1234	1005

Source: Audience measurement performed nationwide by Nielsen Korea.

Average TV viewership ratings
Ep.	Original broadcast date	Average audience share		
Ep.	Original broadcast date	Nielsen Korea		TNmS
Ep.	Original broadcast date	Nationwide	Seoul	Nationwide
1	May 21, 2018	3.739%	4.179%	3.7%
2	May 22, 2018	4.553%	5.201%	4.8%
3	May 28, 2018	5.045%	5.487%	4.9%
4	May 29, 2018	4.924%	5.147%	4.1%
5	June 4, 2018	4.735%	5.049%	4.8%
6	June 5, 2018	5.083%	5.612%	5.2%
7	June 12, 2018	4.475%	4.726%	4.4%
8	June 18, 2018	4.523%	4.660%	4.7%
9	June 19, 2018	4.495%	5.053%	4.6%
10	June 25, 2018	3.838%	4.262%	4.0%
11	June 26, 2018	3.867%	3.946%	4.1%
12	July 2, 2018	3.763%	3.825%	3.9%
13	July 3, 2018	3.438%	3.704%	3.3%
14	July 9, 2018	4.121%	4.494%	4.2%
15	July 10, 2018	4.490%	5.354%	4.5%
16	July 16, 2018	5.333%	5.916%	5.6%
Average		4.401%	4.788%	4.4%
In the table above, the blue numbers represent the lowest ratings and the red numbers represent the highest ratings.; This series aired on a cable channel/pay TV which normally has a relatively smaller audience compared to free-to-air TV/public broadcasters (KBS, SBS, MBC and EBS).; Episode 7 did not air as originally planned on June 11, 2018, due to news coverage of U.S. President Donald Trump and North Korean leader Kim Jong Un's summit in Singapore. The episode aired the following day.

== Awards and nominations ==
Year	Award	Category	Recipient	Result	Ref.
2018	6th APAN Star Awards	Excellence Award, Actress in a Miniseries	Go Ara	Nominated	
2018	6th APAN Star Awards	Best New Actor	Kim Myung-soo	Nominated	
