= 49th Grand Bell Awards =

2012 edition of award ceremony

- Date: October 30, 2012
- Site: KBS Hall in Yeouido, Seoul
- Hosted by: Shin Hyun-joon; Kim Jung-eun

The 49th Grand Bell Awards (Korean: 대종상 영화제; RR: Daejongsang Yeonghwajae), also known as Daejong Film Awards, are determined and presented annually by The Motion Pictures Association of Korea for excellence in film in South Korea. The Grand Bell Awards were first presented in 1962 and have gained prestige as the Korean equivalent of the American Academy Awards.

== 49th ceremony ==
The 49th Grand Bell Awards ceremony was held at the KBS Hall in Yeouido, Seoul on October 30, 2012, and hosted by Shin Hyun-joon and Kim Jung-eun.

== Nominations and winners ==
(Winners denoted in bold)

Best Film	Best Director
**Masquerade**; Silenced; A Muse; Pietà; Unbowed	**Choo Chang-min** - **Masquerade**; Choi Dong-hoon - The Thieves; Chung Ji-young - Unbowed; Kim Ki-duk - Pietà; Lee Yong-ju - Architecture 101
Best Actor	Best Actress
**Lee Byung-hun** - **Masquerade**; Ahn Sung-ki - Unbowed; Choi Min-sik - Nameless Gangster: Rules of the Time; Hwang Jung-min - Dancing Queen; Kim Myung-min - Pacemaker	**Jo Min-su** - **Pietà**; Hwang Jeong-min - Jesus Hospital; Im Soo-jung - All About My Wife; Kim Go-eun - A Muse; Uhm Jung-hwa - Dancing Queen
Best Supporting Actor	Best Supporting Actress
**Ryu Seung-ryong** - **Masquerade**; Jo Jung-suk - Architecture 101; Kim Sung-kyun - Nameless Gangster: Rules of the Time; Ryu Seung-ryong - All About My Wife; Yoo Jun-sang - In Another Country	**Kim Hae-sook** - **The Thieves**; Kang Eun-jin - Pietà; Kim Hyun-soo - Silenced; Moon Jeong-hee - Deranged; Ra Mi-ran - Dancing Queen
Best New Actor	Best New Actress
**Kim Sung-kyun** - **The Neighbor**; Choi Daniel - The Traffickers; Jo Jung-suk - Architecture 101; Kim Sung-kyun - Nameless Gangster: Rules of the Time; Woo Gi-hong - Pietà	**Kim Go-eun** - **A Muse**; Bae Suzy - Architecture 101; Go Ara - Pacemaker; Kang Eun-jin - Pietà; Yoo Hae-jung - Lovable
Best New Director	Best Screenplay
**Choi Jong-tae** - **Hand in Hand**; Kim Dal-joong - Pacemaker; Kim Hong-sun - The Traffickers; Kim Joo-ho - The Grand Heist; Shin A-ga, Lee Sang-cheol - Jesus Hospital	**Hwang Jo-yoon** - **Masquerade**
Best Cinematography	Best Editing
**Lee Tae-yoon** - **Masquerade**	**Nam Na-yeong** - **Masquerade**
Best Art Direction	Best Lighting
**Oh Heung-seok** - **Masquerade**	**Oh Seung-chul** - **Masquerade**
Best Costume Design	Best Music
**Kwon Yu-jin, Im Seung-hee** - **Masquerade**	**Kim Jun-seong, Mowg** - **Masquerade**
Best Visual Effects	Best Sound Effects
**Jung Jae-hoon** - **Masquerade**	**Lee Sang-joon** - **Masquerade**
Best Planning	Best Short Film
**Im Sang-jin** - **Masquerade**	**The Woman**
Special Jury Prize	Special Acting Award
**Kim Ki-duk** - **Pietà**	**Jung Ji-hee**
Popularity Award	Photogenic Award
**Lee Byung-hun** - **Masquerade**	**Min Hyo-rin**
Lifetime Achievement Award
**Kwak Jeong-hwan** (Producer); **Ko Eun-ah** (Actress)
