= Haechi (TV series) =

2019 South Korean television series

- Promotional poster
- Hangul: 해치
- Hanja: 獬豸
- RR: Haechi
- MR: Haech'i
- Genre: Historical period; Adventure
- Written by: Kim Yi-young
- Directed by: Lee Yong-suk
- Starring: Jung Il-woo; Go Ara; Kwon Yul; Park Hoon
- Country of origin: South Korea
- Original language: Korean
- No. of episodes: 48 (Note: In order to circumvent Korean laws that prevent commercial breaks in the middle of an episode, what would previously have been aired as single 70 minute episodes are now being repackaged as two 35 minute episodes, with two episodes being shown each night with a commercial break between the two.)

Production
- Executive producers: Kim Nam-pyo; Sohn Ki-won
- Production location: Yongin Daejanggeum Park
- Camera setup: Single-camera
- Running time: 35 minutes
- Production company: Kim Jong-hak Production

Original release
- Network: SBS TV
- Release: February 11 – April 30, 2019

Haechi (Korean: 해치) is a 2019 South Korean television series starring Jung Il-woo, Go Ara, Kwon Yul, and Park Hoon. Produced by Kim Jong-hak Production, it aired on SBS TV from February 11 to April 30, 2019, every Monday and Tuesday at 22:00 (KST) for 48 episodes.

== Synopsis ==
Set during the Joseon dynasty period, the series follows four people from different walks of life who come together to help Yi Geum, Prince Yeoning (later King Yeongjo) claim the throne and reform the Saheonbu.

== Cast ==
=== Main ===
- Jung Il-woo as Yi Geum, Prince Yeoning (later King Yeongjo)

An intelligent and zealous prince who is discriminated against for his mother's lowly background.

- Go Ara as Chun Yeo-ji

A female police detective of the Saheonbu. One of the best female investigators, she has a talent for both martial arts and foreign languages. Later, she enters the palace as a court maid for Queen Dowager Inwon.

- Kwon Yul as Bak Mun-su

A passionate man who seeks justice and aims to protect the weak and the poor. He is preparing for the civil service exam to become a public officer. Later, he becomes an investigator of Saheonbu, and a secret investigator for King Yeongjo.

- Park Hoon as Dal-moon

Portraying himself as a beggar, he controls a network of informants and storytellers who collect information from all around Joseon's capital and influence common people's opinion.

- Lee Geung-young as Min Jin-won, the late Queen Inhyeon's brother, a leader of the Noron political faction and one of the most seasoned politicians in Joseon court.
- Jung Moon-sung as Yi Tan, Prince Milpung, Crown Prince Sohyeon's direct descendant. He believes that the Joseon throne should be owned by a descendant of Crown Prince Sohyeon. Using all means necessary, he tries to seize the position of Crown Prince and, subsequently, the throne.
- Bae Jung-hwa as Chun Yoon-young / Bok-dan. Dreaming of becoming the Queen of Joseon, she helps Prince Milpung's cause and becomes his partner.
- Han Sang-jin as Wi Byung-joo. An investigator of Saheonbu. Coming from a family of Namin (Southerners) political faction, he faces difficulties in his career as investigator, until he aligns himself with Noron political faction, and controls Saheonbu on their behalf.

=== Supporting ===
- Han Ji-sang as Do Ji-kwang
- Park Ji-yeon as Cho Hong
- Yoo Jung-rae as Kyu Hwa-eun
- Han Seung-hyun as Yi Yun, Crown Prince Hwiso (Later King Gyeongjong)
- Nam Gi-ae as Queen Inwon
- Choi Soo-im as Queen Jeongseong / Lady Seo
- Jung Sun-won as Joo Young-han
- Jung In-seo as Go-mi
- Choi Min-chul as Yoon Hyuk
- Jeon Bae-soo as Jang Dal
- Ahn Seung-gyun as Ah Bong
- Im Ho as Yi Kwang-jwa
- Do Ki-seok as Kae Dol
- Ha Sung-kwang as Ja Dong
- Seo Eun-yul as Han Joon-jae
- Lee Won-jae as Kim Chang-jib
- Kim Jong-soo as Lee I-myung
- Noh Young-hak as Yi Hwon, Prince Yeonryeong
- Lee Jae-woo as New Inspector
- Lee Pil-mo as Han Jeong Seok
- Song Ji-in as Crown Princess Eo (Later Queen Seonui)
- Go Joo-won as Yi In-Jwa
- Lee Do-yeop as Jo Hyeon-myeong

=== Special appearance ===
- Kim Kap-soo as Yi Sun, King Sukjong

== Production ==
First script reading took place in December 2018 at SBS Ilsan Production Studios in Goyang, Gyeonggi Province, South Korea.

On March 7, 2019, it was reported that during the filming of the drama, Go Ara ruptured her Anterior talofibular ligament which resulted in her being hospitalised and having to wear a cast.

== Original soundtrack ==
Haechi OST

Soundtrack album by Various artists
- Recorded: 2019
- Genre: Soundtrack
- Languages: Korean; English
- Labels: Vlending, SBS Contents Hub

=== Part 1 ===
Released on February 25, 2019
No.	Title	Lyrics	Music	Artist	Length
1.	"Love Poem" (순애보)	Jeon Chang-yeob, Kim Kyeong-beom	Jeon Chang-yeob, Kim Kyeong-beom, Kim Ji-hwan	Jung-in	4:11
2.	"Love Poem" (Inst.)		Jeon Chang-yeob, Kim Kyeong-beom, Kim Ji-hwan		4:11
Total length:					8:22

=== Part 2 ===
Released on April 3, 2019
No.	Title	Lyrics	Music	Artist	Length
1.	"Story Conveyed By The Wind" (바람이 전하는 이야기)	Jeon Chang-yeob, Kim Kyeong-beom	Jeon Chang-yeob, Kim Kyeong-beom, HelloGoodBoy	Jeon Woo-sung (Noel)	4:56
2.	"Story Conveyed By The Wind" (Inst.)		Jeon Chang-yeob, Kim Kyeong-beom, HelloGoodBoy		4:56
Total length:					9:52

== Ratings ==
- In this table, the blue numbers represent the lowest ratings and the red numbers represent the highest ratings.
- NR denotes that the drama did not rank in the top 20 daily programs on that date.
- N/A denotes that the rating is not known.

Ep.	Original broadcast date	Title	Average audience share		
Ep.	Original broadcast date	Title	TNmS	AGB Nielsen	
Ep.	Original broadcast date	Title	Nationwide	Nationwide	Seoul
1	February 11, 2019	The Lowly Prince (천한 왕자)	5.4%	6.0% (20th)	6.9% (16th)
2	February 11, 2019	The Lowly Prince (천한 왕자)	6.6%	7.1% (14th)	7.1% (11th)
3	February 12, 2019	Your Name Is... (너의 이름은)	6.0%	6.4% (15th)	7.3% (12th)
4	February 12, 2019	Your Name Is... (너의 이름은)	6.9%	6.9% (11th)	7.5% (8th)
5	February 18, 2019	The Misfortunes of Virtue (미덕의 불운)	6.0%	5.0% (NR)	5.8% (19th)
6	February 18, 2019	The Misfortunes of Virtue (미덕의 불운)	6.8%	6.3% (15th)	7.0% (14th)
7	February 19, 2019	The Night of Fate (운명이 헤매는 밤)	5.6%	5.1% (NR)	5.6% (20th)
8	February 19, 2019	The Night of Fate (운명이 헤매는 밤)	6.5%	5.9% (18th)	6.4% (15th)
9	February 25, 2019	Back to the Living (다시, 산자에게)	—N/a	5.4% (NR)	6.0% (16th)
10	February 25, 2019	Back to the Living (다시, 산자에게)	6.0%	6.1% (17th)	6.4% (14th)
11	February 26, 2019	Wavering Alliance (흔들리는 동맹)	5.3%	5.0% (NR)	5.4% (NR)
12	February 26, 2019	Wavering Alliance (흔들리는 동맹)	6.7%	6.4% (13th)	6.8% (11th)
13	March 4, 2019	The Art of Propaganda (선동의 기술)	—N/a	4.9% (NR)	5.5% (19th)
14	March 4, 2019	The Art of Propaganda (선동의 기술)	6.3%	6.4% (15th)	7.1% (9th)
15	March 5, 2019	The Beginning of the Counterattack (반격의 서막)	6.4%	6.6% (17th)	7.3% (14th)
16	March 5, 2019	The Beginning of the Counterattack (반격의 서막)	7.3%	7.9% (10th)	8.6% (5th)
17	March 11, 2019	The Strike of Man (사람의 가격)	5.7%	6.5% (18th)	6.8% (15th)
18	March 11, 2019	The Strike of Man (사람의 가격)	6.7%	7.5% (12th)	7.8% (11th)
19	March 12, 2019	The Girl with the Black Tattoo (검은 무신을 한 소녀)	5.9%	6.1% (18th)	6.8% (128th)
20	March 12, 2019	The Girl with the Black Tattoo (검은 무신을 한 소녀)	7.1%	7.2% (13th)	7.7% (10th)
21	March 18, 2019	The Limp, The Face with Smallpox Scars (절름발이, 얽은 얼굴, 아홉 손가락)	5.8%	5.5% (20th)	6.2% (16th)
22	March 18, 2019	The Limp, The Face with Smallpox Scars (절름발이, 얽은 얼굴, 아홉 손가락)	6.8%	7.0% (11th)	7.6% (10th)
23	March 19, 2019	A Criminal Transaction (죄의 거래)	6.0%	5.7% (18th)	6.0% (16th)
24	March 19, 2019	A Criminal Transaction (죄의 거래)	7.0%	6.7% (12th)	7.3% (7th)
25	March 25, 2019	Temptation (미혹)	6.3%	6.5% (17th)	6.9% (14th)
26	March 25, 2019	Temptation (미혹)	6.5%	6.8% (12th)	7.2% (11th)
27	March 26, 2019	Decisive Battle (결전)	6.1%	6.7% (13th)	7.1% (12th)
28	March 26, 2019	Decisive Battle (결전)	6.9%	7.4% (9th)	8.3% (6th)
29	April 1, 2019	Decisive Battle (결전)	6.7%	7.2% (13th)	7.7% (9th)
30	April 1, 2019	Decisive Battle (결전)	7.6%	8.1% (9th)	8.7% (7th)
31	April 2, 2019	The Trace of Evil (악의 흔적)	7.1%	7.8% (7th)	8.6% (7th)
32	April 2, 2019	The Trace of Evil (악의 흔적)	7.8%	8.4% (5th)	9.1% (5th)
33	April 8, 2019	A Sorrowful Duty (슬픈 사명)	6.4%	7.5% (11th)	8.6% (7th)
34	April 8, 2019	A Sorrowful Duty (슬픈 사명)	7.0%	8.2% (8th)	9.1% (6th)
35	April 9, 2019	The Rights to Become a King (군왕의 자격)	7.1%	7.4% (15th)	7.4% (12th)
36	April 9, 2019	The Rights to Become a King (군왕의 자격)	8.3%	8.2% (7th)	8.5% (7th)
37	April 15, 2019	A Black Chaos (검은 환란)	6.1%	6.2% (16th)	6.4% (15th)
38	April 15, 2019	A Black Chaos (검은 환란)	6.8%	7.1% (9th)	7.4% (9th)
39	April 16, 2019	A Black Chaos (검은 환란)	6.3%	6.9% (10th)	7.4% (9th)
40	April 16, 2019	A Black Chaos (검은 환란)	7.3%	8.1% (7th)	9.0% (7th)
41	April 22, 2019	Rebellion (변란)	6.6%	7.3% (10th)	8.1% (7th)
42	April 22, 2019	Rebellion (변란)	7.3%	8.0% (6th)	8.8% (5th)
43	April 23, 2019	Triumph (승전)	7.2%	7.5% (8th)	8.2% (8th)
44	April 23, 2019	Triumph (승전)	7.7%	8.2% (5th)	9.0% (5th)
45	April 29, 2019	An Old Hope (오래된 희망)	6.6%	6.9% (13th)	6.9% (11th)
46	April 29, 2019	An Old Hope (오래된 희망)	6.7%	7.0% (12th)	7.1% (7th)
47	April 30, 2019	Haechi: The Legendary Beast That Differentiates Good and Evil (해치: 선악을 구부하는 전설 속의 동물)	6.5%	7.1% (10th)	7.4% (9th)
48	April 30, 2019	Haechi: The Legendary Beast That Differentiates Good and Evil (해치: 선악을 구부하는 전설 속의 동물)	7.3%	7.4% (8th)	7.7% (8th)
Average			6.6%	6.8%	7.4%

== Awards and nominations ==
Year	Award	Category	Recipient	Result
2019	SBS Drama Awards	Producer Award	Jung Il-woo	Nominated
2019	SBS Drama Awards	Top Excellence Award, Actor in a Mid-Length Drama	Jung Il-woo	Nominated
2019	SBS Drama Awards	Top Excellence Award, Actress in a Mid-Length Drama	Go Ara	Nominated
2019	SBS Drama Awards	Excellence Award, Actor in a Mid-Length Drama	Kwon Yul	Nominated
2019	SBS Drama Awards	Excellence Award, Actress in a Mid-Length Drama	Bae Jung-hwa	Nominated
2019	SBS Drama Awards	Best Supporting Actor	Park Hoon	Nominated
2019	SBS Drama Awards	Best Character Award, Actor	Jung Moon-sung	Won
2019	SBS Drama Awards	Best Couple Award	Jung Il-woo and Go Ara	Nominated
