= Who Are You? (2008 TV series) =

2008 South Korean TV series

- Promotional poster
- Also known as: Who R U?
- Genre: Comedy; Drama; Romance
- Written by: Bae Yoo-mi
- Directed by: Shin Hyun-chang; Noh Jong-chan
- Starring: Yoon Kye-sang; Go Ara; Kang Nam-gil
- Opening theme: "Who Are You?" by Kim Sang-heon
- Country of origin: South Korea
- Original language: Korean
- No. of episodes: 17

Production
- Executive producers: Jung Hoon-tak; Jang Jin-wook; Jung Ho-chul
- Producer: Oh Kyung-hoon
- Running time: 70 minutes
- Production company: SidusHQ

Original release
- Network: MBC TV
- Release: March 5 – May 1, 2008

Who Are You? (Korean: 누구세요?; RR: Nuguseyo?) is a 2008 South Korean television series starring Yoon Kye-sang, Go Ara and Kang Nam-gil. It aired on MBC TV from March 3 to May 1, 2008 on Wednesdays and Thursdays at 21:55 for 17 episodes.

== Plot ==
Son Il-gun is a middle-aged deliveryman and devoted father to his daughter, Young-in. Young-in just graduated from high school and is an aspiring cartoonist, but she is working part-time instead of going to college due to financial difficulties, which the quick-tempered young woman partly blames on her "loser" father. She has no idea that Il-gun was once a struggling artist in his youth, but now that one of his paintings was sold for an exorbitant amount to a collector in New York, a local gallery offers Il-gun a solo exhibition. But before he can make a decision, Il-gun dies in a traffic accident, leaving Young-in penniless. According to Buddhism, the soul of a dead person is allowed to wander for 49 days in order to let go of all earthly attachments before going to the afterlife. But Il-gun loves his daughter so much that he takes it one step further, and possesses a stranger's body to care for Young-in and make it up to her.

Cha Seung-hyo was abandoned as a child, then adopted and raised in the United States. He is now a cold-hearted, perfectionist corporate raider without any meaningful relationships. However, after a traffic accident, he begins to lose time and wake up in strange situations, and he eventually learns that Il-gun is spiritually possessing him for three hours a day. Not only does Young-in find it suspicious that this stranger is suddenly concerned about her well-being, buying her expensive clothes and food, but Seung-hyo's subordinates also find it weird that he periodically acts out of character like a manically cheerful, old-fashioned man. Against his will, Seung-hyo gets drawn into Young-in's life, and discovers that Shin Jae-ha, owner of Nuri Art Gallery, is ingratiating himself with her, hoping to find more of the late Il-gun's paintings and buy them off her for less than they're worth. Young-in initially dislikes and mistrusts Seung-hyo, but the more she gets to know him, she glimpses his loneliness and gradually falls for him, which inevitably leads to awkwardness and hijinks.

== Cast ==
- Yoon Kye-sang as Cha Seung-hyo
- Go Ara as Son Young-in
- Kang Nam-gil as Son Il-gun, Young-in's father
- Jin Yi-han as Shin Jae-ha, owner of Nuri Art Gallery
- Park Ji-young as Kim Young-ae, Il-gun's girlfriend
- Kim Sung-eun as Yoon Ha-young, gallery curator
- Lee Eon as Kwon Yong-deok, Young-in's friend
- Lee Min-jung as Yang Ji-sook, Young-in's friend
- Jung Ho-bin as Yoon Hoo-jin, Seung-hyo's lawyer
- Ahn Sun-young as Yeo Ji-won, Seung-hyo's secretary
- Jo Deok-hyun as Driver Pi, Seung-hyo's chauffeur
- Gi Ju-bong as Cha Chul-soo, Seung-hyo's father
- Kim Mi-kyung as Oh Young-hee, Seung-hyo's mother
- Kim Hyung-jong as Loan shark 1
- Jung Hwan-gyu as Loan shark 2
- Yoon Joo-sang as Sa Shin ("Angel of Death" or "Reaper")
- Sunwoo Yong-nyeo as Geum Nan-hee, Jae-ha's mother
- Baek Jung-min as Jang Dong-gun
- Kim Sung-kyum as President Kim
- Kwon Hae-hyo as Funeral service counselor
- Min Ah-ryung
- Park Kwang-jung

== Awards and nominations ==
| Year | Award | Category | Recipient | Result |
|---|---|---|---|---|
| 2008 | 27th MBC Drama Awards | Best New Actress | Go Ara | Nominated |
