= Kim Sung-kyun =

South Korean actor

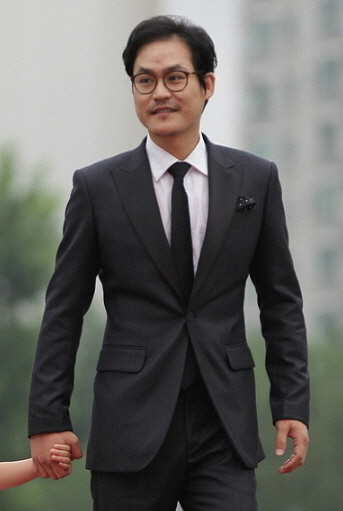
- Kim in July 2015
- Born: May 25, 1980 (age 46); Daegu, South Korea
- Occupation: Actor
- Years active: 2003–present
- Agent: UL Entertainment
- Spouse: Kim Hye-jung (m. 2010)
- Children: 3

Korean name
- Hangul: 김성균
- Hanja: 金成均
- RR: Gim Seonggyun
- MR: Kim Sŏnggyun

Kim Sung-kyun (Korean: 김성균; born May 25, 1980) is a South Korean character actor. He began his career in theater in 2003, remaining active as a theater actor in Daehangno (akin to Off-Broadway) from 2004 to 2012. In 2012, he transitioned to film, making his Chungmuro debut in a series of formidable villain roles. These included a gangster in Nameless Gangster: Rules of the Time, a serial killer in The Neighbor, a National Intelligence Service agent in Secretly, Greatly, and a knifeman in Hwayi: A Monster Boy. He ventured into television with supporting roles in Reply 1994 (2013), Reply 1988 (2015–2016), and Moon Lovers: Scarlet Heart Ryeo (2016), as well as leading roles in series D.P. (2021–2023) and Divorce Attorney Shin (2023).

== Career ==
Kim Sung-kyun was born on May 25, 1980 and spent his childhood in Daegu. He debuted in the 2003 play Romeo and Juliet. His acting career truly commenced in Daehangno after he moved to Seoul in 2004, where he dedicated a decade to theater, starring in productions like Liar, Room Number 13, and I Miss You. He attended Gaya University's Department of Theater and Film for two years before dropping out and marrying in 2010.

Kim made his film debut in 2012 with Yoon Jong-bin's gangster film starring Choi Min-sik and Ha Jung-woo. He appeared as Park Chang-woo, the right-hand man of Ha Jung-woo's character. His performance garnered praise from the lead actors, leading him to be dubbed a "Chungmuro blue chip." He received nominations for Best New Actor at seven awards ceremonies, winning three: at the Baeksang Arts Awards, the Buil Film Awards, and the Korean Culture and Entertainment Awards.

His second film, the thriller The Neighbor, centers on a serial killer residing in the same apartment building as his victims, one of whom is a murdered girl, and the neighbors who become aware of his presence. In the film, Kim portrays Seung-hyeok, a deep-sea fishing boat crew member and the serial killer. His portrayal earned him the Best New Actor award from the Busan Film Critics Awards in 2012, as well as the Grand Bell Awards and the Korean Association of Film Critics Awards in the same year.

In 2013, Kim successfully broadened his scope to television, taking on a comedic role in tvN's Reply 1994. This unexpected comedic turn, marked by his innocent expressions and dialect acting, garnered him significant popularity and the nickname 'Pobely' (Samcheonpo + Lovely).

In 2025, Kim starred in Netflix's crime thriller television series Karma directed by Lee Il-hyung. It is based on the Kakao webtoon of the same name by Choi Hee-seon, about people who are unexpectedly entangled and destroy each other while pursuing their own desires.

== Personal life ==
Kim met his wife as college classmate and later married her in 2010. They have two sons and one daughter. He enjoys carpentry, having built a handmade swing for each child.

== Filmography ==
=== Film ===
Year	Title	Role	Notes	Ref.
2012	Nameless Gangster: Rules of the Time	Park Chang-woo		
2012	The Neighbor	Ryu Seung-hyuk		
2012	577 Project	Himself	documentary	
2013	Man on the Edge	Choon-bong		
2013	South Bound	Bong Man-deok		
2013	Secretly, Greatly	Seo Soo-hyuk		
2013	Hwayi: A Monster Boy	Dong-beom		
2013	Fasten Your Seatbelt	Jo-rong		
2013	The Suspect	Ri Kwang-jo		
2014	Kundo: Age of the Rampant	Mr. Jang		
2014	We Are Brothers	Park Ha-yeon		
2015	Chronicle of a Blood Merchant	Geun-ryong		
2015	The Deal	Seung-hyun		
2015	Summer Snow	Seo-jung's manager		
2015	The Chosen: Forbidden Cave	Jin-myeong		
2016	Phantom Detective	Kang Sung-il		
2017	The Prison	Doctor Kim		
2017	The Sheriff in Town	Duk-man		
2017	The Poet and the Boy	Friend	Special appearance	
2017	The Preparation	In-gyoo		
2017	Wretches	Detective Kang		
2018	Golden Slumber	Geum-chul		
2018	Feng Shui	Kim Byeong-gi		
2018	The Witness	Hyung Gyun		
2018	I Have a Date with Spring	Adidas man		
2019	Story of Villains			
2019	The Divine Move 2: The Wrathful	Heo Il-do		
2021	Waiting for Rain	Academy lecturer	Cameo	
2021	Sinkhole	Park Dong-won		
2022	Hansan: Rising Dragon	Kato		
2022	Seoul Vibe	Director Lee Hyun Kyun		
2023	Don't Buy the Seller	Detective Joo		
2023	12.12: The Day	Kim Jun-yeop		
2024	Officer Black Belt	Kim Sun-min		

=== Television series ===
Year	Title	Role	Notes	Ref.
2013	I Can Hear Your Voice	Detective	Cameo (episode 1)	
2013	Reply 1994	Sam Cheon-po		
2014	Cunning Single Lady	Head of IT security	Cameo (episode 3)	
2015	Reply 1988	Kim Sung-kyun		
2016	Moon Lovers: Scarlet Heart Ryeo	Choi Ji-mong		
2016	Entourage	Himself	Cameo (episode 4)	
2017	Untouchable	Jang Ki-seo		
2019–2024	The Fiery Priest	Gu Dae-young	Season 1–2	
2020	Hospital Playlist	Jung-won's second eldest brother	Cameo (episode 1)	
2023	Divorce Attorney Shin	Jang Hyeong-geun		
2021–2023	D.P.	Park Bum-gu	Season 1–2	
2022	Grid	Kim Man-ok / Lee Si-won		
2022	Weak Hero Class 1	Gyu-jin	Special appearance	
2023	Moving	Lee Jae-man		
2025	Karma	Jang Gil-ryong		
2025	Nine Puzzles	Yang Jeong-ho		

=== Web series ===
Year	Title	Role	Notes	Ref.
2013	After School: Lucky or Not	himself	Cameo (episode 6)	

=== Television show ===
Year	Title	Role	Ref.
2023	Follow Hyung to Maya	Cast member	
2025–2026	Reply 1988 10th Anniversary	Cast member	

== Stage ==
=== Concert and musical ===
Concert and musical play performances
Year	Title		Role	Venue	Date	Ref.
Year	English	Korean	Role	Venue	Date	Ref.
2007 to 2008	Dugeun Dugeun "Thumping Heart"	두근두근	Lonely man Muscular Famous Acapella Singer of	Daehakro Danmak Theater	November 15, 2007 – May 12, 2008	
2008	Dugeun Dugeun "Thumping Heart"	두근두근	Lonely man Muscular Famous Acapella Singer of	Daehakro Danmak Theater	June 19, 2008 – April 30, 2009	
2008	2nd Busan Summer Musical Festival - Dugeun Dugeun	제2회 부산썸머뮤지컬페스티벌 - 두근두근	Lonely man Muscular Famous Acapella Singer of	Kyungsung University Yeno Small Theater	July 26 – August 17	
2008	Dugeun Dugeun (Heartbeat)	두근두근	Lonely man Muscular Famous Acapella Singer of	Dongbang Arts Theater	December 24 – December 25	
2014	Reply 1994 Drama Concert	응답하라 1994 드라마 콘서트	Expert	Grand Peace Palace, Kyung Hee University	February 15 – February 15	

=== Theater ===
Theater play performances
Year	Title		Role	Venue	Date	Ref.
Year	English	Korean	Role	Venue	Date	Ref.
2005	Kang Full's Pure Love Comic	순정만화		—N/a		
2005	Room No. 13	룸넘버13		—N/a		
2006	Suspense Hamlet	서스펜스 햄릿	Theater Actor	Former Daehakro Dongsung Stage Small Theater	June 15 – September 3	
2008	Liar 1 Shot	라이어 1탄	Bobby Franklin	Gangnam Dongyang Art Hall	April 11, 2008 – January 1, 2012	
2008	I Want to See You, Missing You	보고싶습니다	Dok-hee	Kyungsung University Yeno Small Theater	December 22, 2008 – December 31, 2008	
2009	I Want to See You, Missing You	보고싶습니다	Dok-hee	Yeollim Hall	November 28, 2008 – January 4, 2009	
2009	I Want to See You, Missing You	보고싶습니다	Dok-hee	Mudis Hall	January 9 – April 19	
2009	I Want to See You, Missing You	보고싶습니다	Dok-hee	Kyungsung University Yeno Small Theater	February 6 – March 1	
2009	I Want to See You, Missing You	보고싶습니다	Dok-hee	Culture and Arts Exclusive Theater CT	May 8 – June 14	
2009 to 2010	Talk During the Last 20 Minutes	마지막 20분 동안 말하다	Haphazard Multi-man	Lemon Art Hall (formerly Arts Play Theater Hall 2)	October 9, 2009 – January 3, 2010	
2010	I Want to See You, Missing You	보고싶습니다	Dok-hee	KBS Suwon Art Hall	January 16 – February 28	
2010 to 2013	Liar 1 Shot	라이어 1탄	Bobby Franklin	Happy Theater	April 1, 2010 – January 20, 2013	
2011	Liar 1 Shot	라이어 1탄	Bobby Franklin	Gyeongnam Culture and Arts Center (Jinju Culture and Arts Center)	April 1 – April 3	

== Awards and nominations ==
Name of the award ceremony, year presented, category, nominee of the award, and the result of the nomination
Award ceremony	Year	Category	Nominee / Work	Result	Ref.
Asian Film Awards	2013	Best Newcomer	Nameless Gangster: Rules of the Time	Nominated	
Baeksang Arts Awards	2012	Best New Actor	Nameless Gangster: Rules of the Time	Won	
Baeksang Arts Awards	2014	Best New Actor (TV)	Reply 1994	Nominated	
Blue Dragon Film Awards	2012	Best New Actor	Nameless Gangster: Rules of the Time	Nominated	
Blue Dragon Series Awards	2024	Best Supporting Actor	Moving	Nominated	
Buil Film Awards	2012	Best New Actor	Nameless Gangster: Rules of the Time	Won	
Busan Film Critics Awards	2012	Best New Actor	The Neighbor	Won	
Grand Bell Awards	2012	Best New Actor	The Neighbor	Won	
Grand Bell Awards	2012	Best Supporting Actor	Nameless Gangster: Rules of the Time	Nominated	
Grand Bell Awards	2012	Best New Actor	Nameless Gangster: Rules of the Time	Nominated	
Korea Drama Awards	2014	Best Couple Award	Kim Sung-kyun with Min Do-hee; Reply 1994	Won	
Korea Drama Awards	2023	Excellence Award, Actor	D.P.	Won	
Korean Association of Film Critics Awards	2012	Best New Actor	The Neighbor	Won	
Korean Culture and Entertainment Awards	2012	Best New Actor	Nameless Gangster: Rules of the Time	Won	
SBS Drama Awards	2016	Special Acting Award, Actor in a Fantasy Drama	Moon Lovers: Scarlet Heart Ryeo	Nominated	
SBS Drama Awards	2019	Excellence Award, Actor in a Mid-Length Drama	The Fiery Priest	Won	
tvN10 Awards	2016	Scene-Stealer, Actor	Reply 1988	Won	
