= Min Do-hee =

South Korean singer and actress (born 1994)

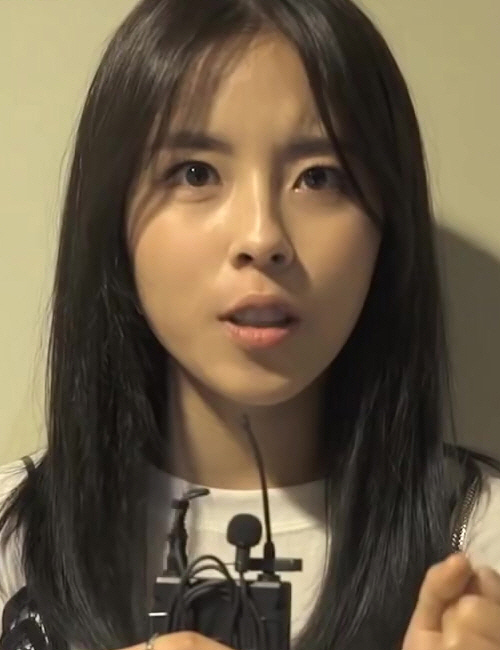
- Min in 2016
- Born: September 25, 1994 (age 32); Yeosu, South Korea
- Occupations: Actress; singer
- Years active: 2012–present
- Musical career
- Genre: K-pop
- Instrument: Vocals
- Years active: 2012–2015
- Label: GNG Production
- Member of: Tiny-G

Korean name
- Hangul: 민도희
- Hanja: 閔都凞
- RR: Min Dohui
- MR: Min Tohŭi

Min Do-hee (Korean: 민도희; born September 25, 1994), professionally known as Dohee, is a South Korean actress and singer. She debuted in 2012 as a lead vocal of South Korean girl group Tiny-G. She made her acting debut in 2013 with tvN drama Reply 1994. In 2015, it was announced that Tiny-G was taking an indefinite hiatus and she later transitioned into acting.

== Discography ==
=== Singles ===
Year	Title	Notes	Album
2013	"Fate"	duet with Kim Sung-kyun	track from Reply 1994 OST
2013	"Keep In Touch"	Untouchable feat. Dohee	track from Untouchable: Fourth Mini Album 'TRIP'
2014	"Mirror Mirror"	duet with J.Min	track from Cunning Single Lady OST

== Filmography ==
=== Film ===
Year	Title	Role	Ref.
2014	Tunnel 3D	Girl	
2015	Perfect Proposal	Yoo-mi	
2017	Daddy You, Daughter Me	Bae Jin-young	
2018	Hideout	Se-young	
2021	The Book of Fish	Bok Rye	
2022	The Leading Role	Joo-yeon	

=== Television series ===
Year	Title	Role	Ref.
2013	Reply 1994	Jo Yoon-jin	
2014	Mother's Garden	Ha Ri-ra (cameo)	
2014	Pluto Secret Society	Convenience store customer (cameo)	
2014	Boarding House No. 24	Min Do-hee	
2014	Naeil's Cantabile	Choi Min-hee	
2015	Hogu's Love	High school girl in Yeosu (cameo, episode 2)	
2015	My Mom	Kong Soon-yi	
2016	My Horrible Boss	Emily (cameo)	
2016	Entertainer	Luna (cameo, episode 4)	
2016	Secret Healer	Soon-deuk	
2017	Girls' Generation 1979	Ae-sook	
2017	Hit the Top	Choi Woo-seung's roommate (cameo, episode 2)	
2018	My First Love	Jang So-ra	
2018	Gangnam Beauty	Oh Hyun-jung	
2018	Clean with Passion for Now	Min Joo-yeon	
2019	Jo Mi-ryo	Jo Mi-ryo	
2020	365: Repeat the Year	Min Joo-young	
2020	How to Buy a Friend	Choi Mi-ra	
2022	Rookie Cops	Woo Joo-young	

=== Web series ===
Year	Title	Role	Ref.
2019	IN SEOUL	Kang Da-mi	
2019	4 Reasons Why I Hate Christmas	Kang Da-mi	
2020	IN SEOUL 2	Kang Da-mi	

=== Variety show ===
Year	Title	Role	Notes/Ref.
2017	King of Mask Singer	Contestant	As "I'm Not a Girl Anymore. Matilda" (Episode 107)

== Awards and nominations ==
Year	Award	Category	Nominated work	Result	Ref.
2014	50th Baeksang Arts Awards	Best New Actress (TV)	Reply 1994	Nominated	
2014	50th Baeksang Arts Awards	Most Popular Actress (TV)	Reply 1994	Nominated	
2014	7th Korea Drama Awards	Best New Actress	Reply 1994	Won	
2014	7th Korea Drama Awards	Best Couple Award (with Kim Sung-kyun)	Reply 1994	Won	
2014	16th Seoul International Youth Film Festival	Best Young Actress	Reply 1994	Nominated	
2014	3rd APAN Star Awards	Best New Actress	Reply 1994	Nominated	
2021	Golden Cinematography Awards	Best New Actress	The Book of Fish	Won	
