= Papa (2012 South Korean film) =

- Film poster
- Hangul: 파파
- RR: Papa
- MR: P'ap'a
- Directed by: Han Ji-seung
- Written by: Han Ji-seung
- Produced by: Kim Mi-hae
- Starring: Park Yong-woo; Go Ara
- Cinematography: Choi Yoon-man
- Edited by: Lee Hyun-mi
- Music by: Kim Hyeong-seok
- Distributed by: Lotte Entertainment
- Release date: 2 February 2012 (South Korea)
- Running time: 118 minutes
- Country: South Korea
- Languages: Korean; English
- Box office: US$3,378,127

Papa (Korean: 파파) is a 2012 South Korean comedy drama film written and directed by Han Ji-seung. Park Yong-woo stars as a talent manager who persuades his step-daughter from a contract marriage, played by Go Ara, to audition for a reality TV show in the United States.

Go Ara was nominated for Best New Actress at the 48th Baeksang Arts Awards, the 21st Buil Film Awards, and the 33rd Blue Dragon Film Awards in 2012.

== Plot ==
Choon-sub (Park Yong-woo) is a talent manager from South Korea who flies to America to chase after his client who ran away with another manager. He soon learns that she is with child and would be unable to pursue her career. To avoid returning to Korea and face his boss, he gets a residency permit through a contract marriage with a Korean-American woman. When his wife dies in a car accident, he is left with her 6 children, all of different races, from her previous marriages. He discovers that the eldest daughter, June (Go Ara), is a talented singer and dancer. Now in need of money, he convinces her to take part in a reality TV show contest. Because the children need Choon-sub to keep the family together and not be relocated to different homes, June agrees.

== Cast ==
- Park Yong-woo as Choon-sub
- Go Ara as June
- Son Byong-ho as Company president Do
- Michael Anthony McMillan as Gordon
- Meg DeLacy as Maya
- Parker Townsend as Jimmy
- Peyton Townsend as Tammy
- Angela Azar as Rosie
- Yoon Seung-hoon as Yang-moo
- Matthew Eldridge
- Sharyn Shields as Phoebe, of the Children's Bureau
- Jeremiah Hobbs as Phoebe's subordinate
- Leland L. Jones as Immigration agent
- Albert Lee as Immigration agent
- Jae Park Shawl as Mr. Do's subordinate 1
- Yeon Seung-joo as Mr. Do's subordinate 2
- Chase Steven Anderson as Audition coordinator
- Justene Alpert as Rosie, 10 years later
- Lee Gyu-seop as Waiter 1
- Paul Stafford as Auditioner
- Michael Beasley as Coordinator
- Holly Britt as Talent judge
- Sherrie Billings as Nurse
- Montrel Miller as Soldier #2
- Seo Tae-hwa as Department head Seo (cameo)
- Shim Hye-jin as Mi-young (cameo)
- Daniel Henney as Daniel, music producer (cameo)
- Park Sang-cheol as himself (cameo)
- Jiyul as Mila (cameo)
- Julian Quintart (cameo)
