= Pacemaker (film) =

2012 Korean sports drama film

- Theatrical poster
- Directed by: Kim Dal-joong
- Written by: Lee Won-jae; Min Ye-ji; Ryu Hoon
- Produced by: Kim Mi-hee; Kim Mi-jin; Lee Won-jae; Im Se-ho
- Starring: Kim Myung-min; Go Ara
- Cinematography: Lee Sung-jae
- Edited by: Kim Sang-bum; Kim Jae-bum
- Music by: Lee Hyeong-ju; Kang Hak-seon
- Production company: Studio Dream Capture
- Distributed by: Lotte Entertainment
- Release date: January 18, 2012
- Running time: 124 minutes
- Country: South Korea
- Language: Korean
- Box office: US$2.96 million

Pacemaker (Korean: 페이스메이커; RR: Peiseumeikeo) is a 2012 South Korean sports drama film. This was director Kim Dal-joong's feature film debut; he had previously directed stage musicals. Pacemaker received three nominations at the 49th Grand Bell Awards (Best Actor, Best New Director, and Best New Actress).

== Plot ==
Joo Man-ho, a boy from an impoverished family, has a talent for long-distance running but always finishes second place in a race — on purpose, in order to win the box of instant noodles given to runners-up. He grows up to become a national marathoner, but because of an injury, he never becomes a premier athlete and instead hold himself back as he did in his childhood. He is relegated to the role of "pacemaker" – someone who runs alongside the star athletes for three-quarters of the marathon (30 of 42.195 kilometers), making sure they stay on winning pace, but then letting them finish the race alone. Later in life, a cold-hearted marathon coach scouts Joo to run again, this time pacing for Korea's star marathoner at the 2012 London Olympics. This creates an opportunity for Joo to complete his lifetime goal of actually running a full Olympic marathon, but he must first summon the courage and drive to fulfill his dream and run for himself and no one else.

== Cast ==
- Kim Myung-min as Joo Man-ho
- Ahn Sung-ki as Coach Park Seong-il
- Go Ara as Yoo Ji-won
- Choi Tae-joon as Min Yoon-ki
- Jo Hee-bong as Jong-soo
- Choi Jae-woong as Joo Seong-ho
  - Jung Joon-won as Young Seong-ho
- Lee Yul as Kyeong-soon
- Abu Dod as Bongjo
- Park Seong-taek as Pole vault coach
- Yoon Min as Woo-jin
- Gye Seong-yong as Coach Lee
- Choi Na-rae as Jong-soo's wife
- Lee El as Choi Min-kyeong
- Lee Yoo-ha as Seong-ho's wife
- Jo Young-jin as Track and Field federation director
- Kwak Jin-seok as Uyuki
- Im Jong-yoon as Nike director
- Han Seong-sik as Coach Han, London Olympics marathon commentator
