= Lee Jae-woo (actor) =

South Korean actor

- Born: June 28, 1991 (age 35); South Korea
- Other name: Lee Je-woo
- Education: Dankook University
- Occupation: Actor
- Years active: 2013–present

Korean name
- Hangul: 이재우
- RR: I Jaeu
- MR: I Chaeu

Lee Jae-woo (born June 28, 1991), also known as Lee Je-woo, is a South Korean actor. He is best known for his roles in the television series The K2 (2016), When the Camellia Blooms (2019), and Hi Bye, Mama! (2020).

== Filmography ==
=== Television series ===
Year	Title	Role	Ref.
2016	Goodbye Mr. Black	Jae-woo	
2016	The K2	Kang Seong-gyoo	
2017	Queen for Seven Days	Royal Commander	
2018	Ms. Hammurabi	Judge Cheon Seong-hoon	
2019	Haechi	New Inspector	
2019	When the Camellia Blooms	Kwon Oh-joon	
2019	Catch the Ghost	Kim Hyung-soo	
2020	Hi Bye, Mama!	Kang Sang-bong	
2021	The Penthouse 3	Police officer	
2022	Work Later, Drink Now 2	University Student	
2025	Love Scout	Lee Kang-seok	

=== Film ===
Year	Title	Role	Ref.
2013	Secretly, Greatly	North Korea Military Officer	
2017	Because I Love You	Audition PD	
2018	The Witness	Detective Jo	
2019	Remain	Detective	
2023	Noryang: Deadly Sea	Japanese army runaway soldier	
