= 33rd Blue Dragon Film Awards =

2012 edition of award ceremony

- Date: November 30, 2012
- Site: Sejong Center for the Performing Arts in Seoul
- Hosted by: Kim Hye-soo; Yoo Jun-sang

Television coverage
- Network: SBS

The 33rd Blue Dragon Film Awards ceremony was held on November 30, 2012 at the Sejong Center for the Performing Arts in Seoul. Presented by Sports Chosun, it was broadcast on SBS and was hosted by Kim Hye-soo and Yoo Jun-sang.

== Nominations and winners ==
Complete list of nominees and winners:

(Winners denoted in bold)

Best Film	Best Director
**Pietà**; Masquerade; Nameless Gangster: Rules of the Time; The Thieves; Unbowed	**Chung Ji-young - Unbowed**; Choi Dong-hoon - The Thieves; Choo Chang-min - Masquerade; Kim Ki-duk - Pietà; Yoon Jong-bin - Nameless Gangster: Rules of the Time
Best Actor	Best Actress
**Choi Min-sik - Nameless Gangster: Rules of the Time as Choi Ik-hyun**; Ahn Sung-ki - Unbowed as Kim Kyung-ho; Ha Jung-woo - Nameless Gangster: Rules of the Time as Choi Hyung-bae; Kim Yoon-seok - Punch as Lee Dong-ju; Lee Byung-hun - Masquerade as King Gwanghae/Ha-sun	**Im Soo-jung** - **All About My Wife as Yeon Jung-in**; Gong Hyo-jin - Love Fiction as Lee Hee-jin; Jo Min-su - Pietà as Jang Mi-sun; Kim Min-hee - Helpless as Kang Seon-yeong/Cha Gyeong-seon; Uhm Jung-hwa - Dancing Queen as Jung-hwa
Best Supporting Actor	Best Supporting Actress
**Ryu Seung-ryong** - **All About My Wife as Jang Sung-ki**; Jang Gwang - Masquerade as Chief Eunuch; Jo Sung-ha - Helpless as Kim Jong-geun; Kwak Do-won - Nameless Gangster: Rules of the Time as Jo Beom-seok; Ma Dong-seok - The Neighbor as Ahn Hyuk-mo	**Moon Jeong-hee** - **Deranged as Gyung-seon**; Jang Young-nam - The Neighbor as Ha Tae-seon; Kim Hae-sook - The Thieves as Chewing Gum; Park Hyo-joo - Punch as Lee Ho-jeong; Ra Mi-ran - Dancing Queen as Myung-ae
Best New Actor	Best New Actress
**Jo Jung-suk** - **Architecture 101 as Nab-ddeuk**; Kim Soo-hyun - The Thieves as Zampano; Kim Sung-kyun - Nameless Gangster: Rules of the Time as Park Chang-woo; Lee Kwang-soo - All About My Wife as PD Choi; Yoo Yeon-seok - Horror Stories as Man	**Kim Go-eun** - **A Muse as Han Eun-gyo**; Bae Suzy - Architecture 101 as Yang Seo-yeon; Go Ara - Papa as June; Han Ye-ri - As One as Yu Sun-bok; Jung Ji-yoon - The Traffickers as Chae-hee
Best New Director	Best Screenplay
**Kim Hong-sun - The Traffickers**; Kim Joo-ho - The Grand Heist; Kim Hwi - The Neighbor; Shin A-ga, Lee Sang-cheol - Jesus Hospital; Woo Seon-ho - Over My Dead Body	**Yoon Jong-bin** - **Nameless Gangster: Rules of the Time**; Choi Dong-hoon, Lee Ki-cheol - The Thieves; Heo Sung-hye, Min Kyu-dong - All About My Wife; Hwang Jo-yoon - Masquerade; Lee Yong-ju - Architecture 101
Best Cinematography	Best Art Direction
**Kim Tae-kyung - A Muse**; Choi Young-hwan - The Thieves; Go Nak-seon - Nameless Gangster: Rules of the Time; Jo Sang-yoon - Architecture 101; Lee Tae-yoon - Masquerade	**Oh Heung-seok** - **Masquerade**; Cho Hwa-sung - Nameless Gangster: Rules of the Time; Jeon Kyung-ran - All About My Wife; Kim Si-yong - A Muse; Woo Seung-mi - Architecture 101
Best Lighting	Best Music
**Hong Seung-chul** - **A Muse**; Kim Sung-kwan - The Thieves; Lee Seung-won - Nameless Gangster: Rules of the Time; Oh Seung-chul - Masquerade; Park Se-mun - Architecture 101	**Jo Yeong-wook** - **Nameless Gangster: Rules of the Time**; Hwang Sang-jun - Dancing Queen; Kim Jun-seong, Lee Jin-hee - All About My Wife; Kim Jun-seong, Mowg - Masquerade; Lee Ji-soo - Architecture 101
Technical Award	Best Short Film
**Yoo Sang-sub, Jung Yoon-hyun** - **The Thieves**; Kwon Yu-jin, Im Seung-hee - Masquerade; Nam Na-yeong - Masquerade; Seo Sang-hwa - Deranged; Song Jong-hee - A Muse	**Night**
Popular Star Award	Audience Choice Award for Most Popular Film
**Bae Suzy** - **Architecture 101**; **Gong Hyo-jin** - **Love Fiction**; **Ha Jung-woo** - **Nameless Gangster: Rules of the Time**; **Kim Soo-hyun** - **The Thieves**	**The Thieves**
