= The Witness (2018 film) =

2018 film by Jo Kyu-jang

- Theatrical poster
- Hangul: 목격자
- Hanja: 目擊者
- RR: Mokgyeokja
- MR: Mokkyŏkcha
- Directed by: Jo Kyu-jang
- Written by: Lee Young-jong
- Produced by: Oh Jung-hyun; Cha Ji-hyun
- Starring: Lee Sung-min; Kim Sang-ho; Jin Kyung; Kwak Si-yang
- Cinematography: Yu Eok
- Edited by: Kim Seon-min
- Music by: Mok Yeong-jin
- Production company: AD406
- Distributed by: Next Entertainment World
- Release date: August 15, 2018
- Running time: 111 minutes
- Country: South Korea
- Language: Korean
- Box office: US$19.2 million

The Witness (Korean: 목격자; RR: Mokgyeokja) is a 2018 South Korean crime thriller film directed by Jo Kyu-jang. It stars Lee Sung-min, Kim Sang-ho, Jin Kyung and Kwak Si-yang. It was released theatrically in South Korea on August 15, 2018. The film is about a man who witnesses a murder and takes no action on what he has seen.

== Plot ==
One night at his apartment, Sang-Hoon hears a woman's scream. He looks outside his apartment and sees Tae-Ho hitting a woman with a hammer. Sang-Hoon and Tae-Ho then make direct eye contact. Too terrified of what he saw, Sang-Hoon does not call the police for fear of retaliation from the killer. The next day, that woman is found dead. Detective Jae-Yeob investigates the case. Sang-Hoon is still terrified and does not tell Detective Jae-Yeob about what he witnessed. Soon, another resident who witnessed the same murder is killed by Tae-Ho. Sang-Hoon tries to protect himself and his family from the murderer.

Eventually, Jae-Yeob manages to track down the killer but he needs Sang-Hoon as witness to formally arrest him but he refuses out of fear. However, after the third witness is beaten to near death, Sang-Hoon breaks down and confesses witnessing the murder and willing to testify. Jae-Yeob and the police get the green light to arrest Tae-Ho but he escapes and hunt down Sang-hoo and his family. Sang-hoo's wife manages to fend off the killer, causing Sang-hoon to chase Tae-Ho through the forest. As they scuffle with each other, a downpour sweeps them under with Sang-hoon escapes while Tae-Ho is impaled by a tree branch and dies.

As Sang-hoon is recovering in the hospital, Jae-Yeob reveals that the police discovers a mass grave of Tae-Ho's past victims and they are unable to find out his motives for killing. At the end of the movie, Sang-hoon and his family move out of the apartment but not before he yells out for help near the apartment to remind the people that "evil prevail when good men fail to act".

== Cast ==
- Lee Sung-min as Sang-Hoon
- Kim Sang-ho as Detective Jae-Yeob
- Jin Kyung as Soo-jin
- Kwak Si-yang as Tae-ho
- Son Jong-hak as Squad chief Choi
- Lee Jae-woo as Detective Jo
- Kim Sung-kyun as Hyung-Gyoon
- Park Bom as Eun-ji
- Kim Nam-hee as Kim Dae-ri
- Shin Seung-hwan as Park Sang-Tae
- Hwang Young-hee as Women's society president
- Jung Jae-kwang as Guy at the store
- Woo Ji-hyun as Newspaper delivery guy
- Lee Min-woong as Woo-min
- Bae Jung-hwa as Seo-yeon
- Yeon Je-wook as Cola
- Kim Hak-sun as Team leader

== Production ==
Principal photography began on September 23, 2017. Production ended in Paju of Gyeonggi Province on December 20, 2017.

== Release ==
The film released theatrically in South Korea on August 15, 2018, with age 15-rating. The Witness was released on VOD by Next Entertainment World on September 8, 2018.

== Reception ==
The film attracted more than 360,000 moviegoers on its first day of release and finished third, behind The Spy Gone North and Along with the Gods: The Last 49 Days. However, the film managed to top the box office on its second day of release. According to the Korean Film Council, the film surpassed one million moviegoers in four days.

On August 24, 2018, the film reached its break-even point, with more than 1.8 million moviegoers having watched the film. After finishing first during its first weekend, the film dropped to second place during its second weekend, trailing behind On Your Wedding Day. The film had a 45% drop in gross during its second weekend, earning US$3.5 million from 433,006 attendance. During its third weekend, the film dropped to fifth place by attracted 102,080 moviegoers with US$814,283 gross, 77% lower gross compared to second weekend. The film dropped to ninth place during its fourth weekend.

As of September 10, the film attracted 2,515,758 admissions with US$19.2 million gross.

== Awards and nominations ==
Awards	Category	Recipient	Result	Ref.
2nd The Seoul Awards	Best Supporting Actor	Kim Sang-ho	Nominated	
