= Phantom Detective =

- Theatrical poster
- Directed by: Jo Sung-hee
- Written by: Jo Sung-hee
- Produced by: Shin Chang-hwan
- Starring: Lee Je-hoon; Kim Sung-kyun; Go Ara
- Cinematography: Byun Bong-sun
- Edited by: Jung Kye-hyun; Nam Na-yeong
- Music by: Kim Tae-seong
- Production companies: Bidangil Pictures; Paramount Pictures
- Distributed by: CJ Entertainment
- Release dates: May 4, 2016 (South Korea and United States)
- Running time: 125 minutes
- Countries: South Korea; United States
- Languages: Korean; English
- Box office: US$10.2 million

Phantom Detective (Korean: 탐정 홍길동: 사라진 마을; lit. 'Detective Hong Gil-Dong: Disappeared Village') is a 2016 neo-noir action thriller film directed and written by Jo Sung-hee. Its central protagonist is a modern iteration of the classic Korean folk hero Hong Gildong. It was released in South Korea on May 4, 2016. It was released in U.S. and Canada on 20 May 2016.

== Synopsis ==
Hong Gil-Dong (Lee Je-hoon) runs an illegal detective agency with President Hwang (Go Ara). They try to take down evil people following the will of President Hwang's late father. Hong Gil-Dong is able to track virtually anyone down in a day, except for Kim Byeong-Duk (Park Geun-hyung) who has eluded him for more than twenty years. Kim Byeong-Duk is the man who killed Hong Gil-Dong's mother. Hong Gil-Dong's memory begins at the age of 8 when his mother was killed.

Finally, Hong Gil-Dong learns of Kim Byeong-Duk's location and drives there late at night. Right before he arrives, Kim Byeong-Duk is kidnapped and only his granddaughters Dong-Yi (Roh Jeong-eui) and Mal-Soon (Kim Ha-na) are left. Following his urge for revenge, Hong Gil-Dong takes the granddaughters to find their grandfather. Soon, Hong Gil-Dong finds himself up against the ultra dark and powerful Gwangeunhwe organization.

== Cast ==
- Lee Je-hoon as Hong Gil-dong
  - Ko Woo-rim as young Gil-dong
- Kim Sung-kyun as Kang Sung-il
- Park Geun-hyung as Kim Byung-deok
- Jung Sung-hwa as Innkeeper
- Go Ara as President Hwang
- Roh Jeong-eui as Dong-i
- Kim Ha-na as Mal-soon
- Lee Jun-hyeok as real estate agency owner
- Hwang Bo-ra as used-book store woman
- Byun Yo-han as Gwangeunhwe member following Hong Gil-dong (cameo)
- Yoo Seung-mok as Tae-kwang auto repair shop owner
- Hong Yeong Geon as Kim Jin-ho
- Yoon Yeong-gyoon as Choi Tae-jeong
- Jung Sung-hwa as innkeeper
- Lee Min-woong as Chinese restaurant employee
- Park Ji-Hoon as police officer 1
- Park Jung-won as police officer 4
