= Go Ara =

South Korean actress (born 1990)

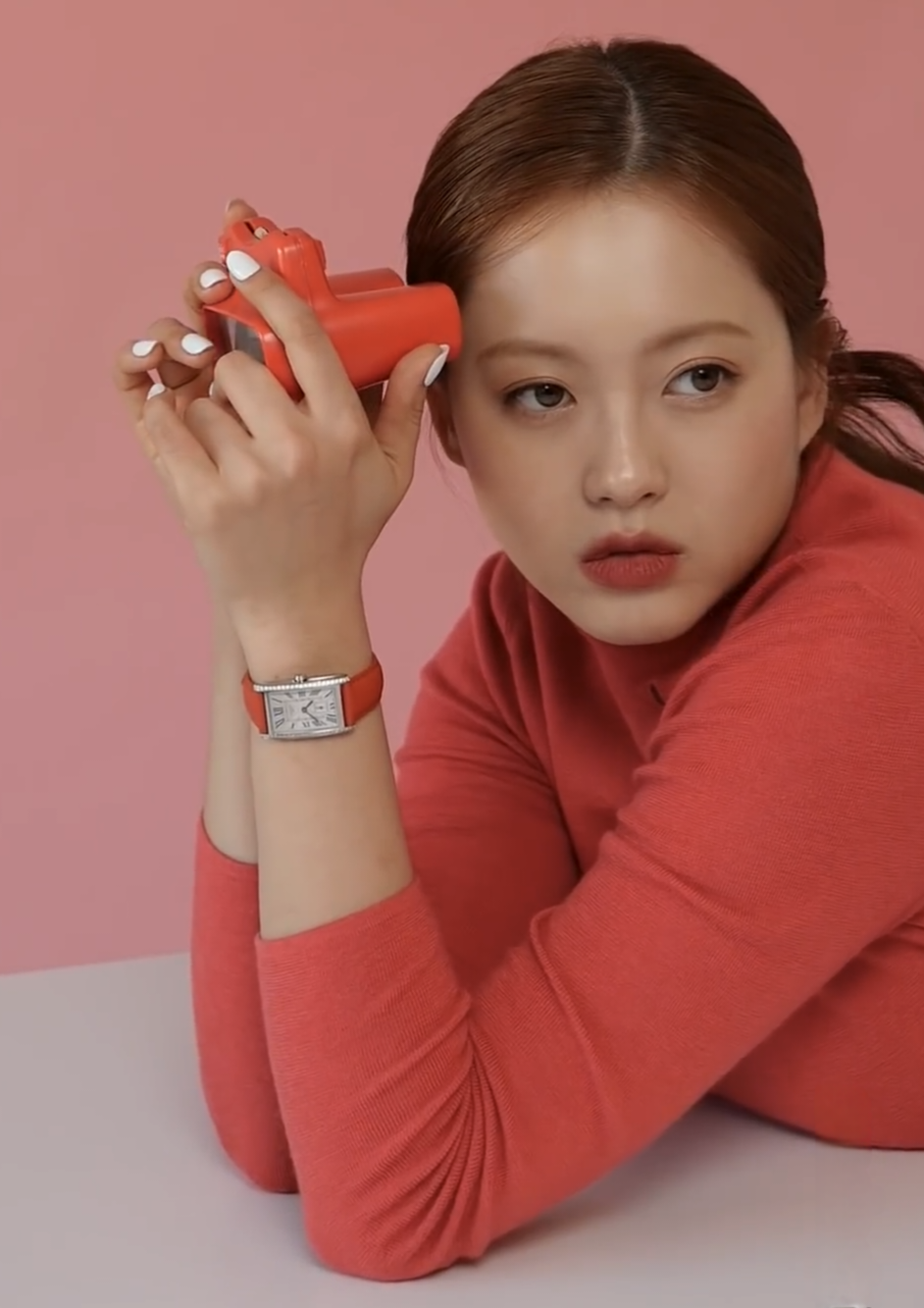
- Go in December 2020
- Born: February 11, 1990 (age 36); Jinju, South Korea
- Education: Chung-Ang University
- Occupations: Actress; model
- Years active: 2003–present
- Agent: King Kong by Starship
- Height: 169 cm (5 ft 7 in)

Korean name
- Hangul: 고아라
- RR: Go Ara
- MR: Ko Ara

Go Ara (Korean: 고아라; born February 11, 1990) is a South Korean actress and model. She is best known for starring in the television series Sharp (2003), Heading to the Ground (2009), Reply 1994 (2013), You're All Surrounded (2014), Hwarang: The Poet Warrior Youth (2016–17), Black (2017), Ms. Hammurabi (2018), Haechi (2019), and Do Do Sol Sol La La Sol (2020).

== Early life ==
Go was born in Jinju, South Korea. At a young age, she constantly moved around Korea because her father was a soldier. When she was in junior high, she was recommended by a friend to audition for the talent agency SM Entertainment. In 2003, she became the winner of the SM Entertainment Teen Model Contest.

== Career ==
=== 2003–2012: Beginnings and rising popularity ===
Go was chosen to play the female lead, Lee Ok-rim, in the 2003 KBS teen drama Sharp. Her role as an ambitious and confident middle school girl catapulted her to instant stardom. She reprised her role in the sequel Sharp 2.

Go next starred in the 2006 SBS melodrama Snow Flower alongside Kim Hee-ae. Her portrayal of the rebellious and ambitious Yoo Da-mi won her acting recognition at the Baeksang Arts Awards.

Go's first film was the big-budget Japanese movie Genghis Khan: To the Ends of the Earth and Sea, which was released in Japan in March 2007. She played Khulan, the mistress of Genghis Khan, after being picked from more than 40,000 auditions. Go was then cast in another Japanese film, Dance Subaru due to her fluency in the language.

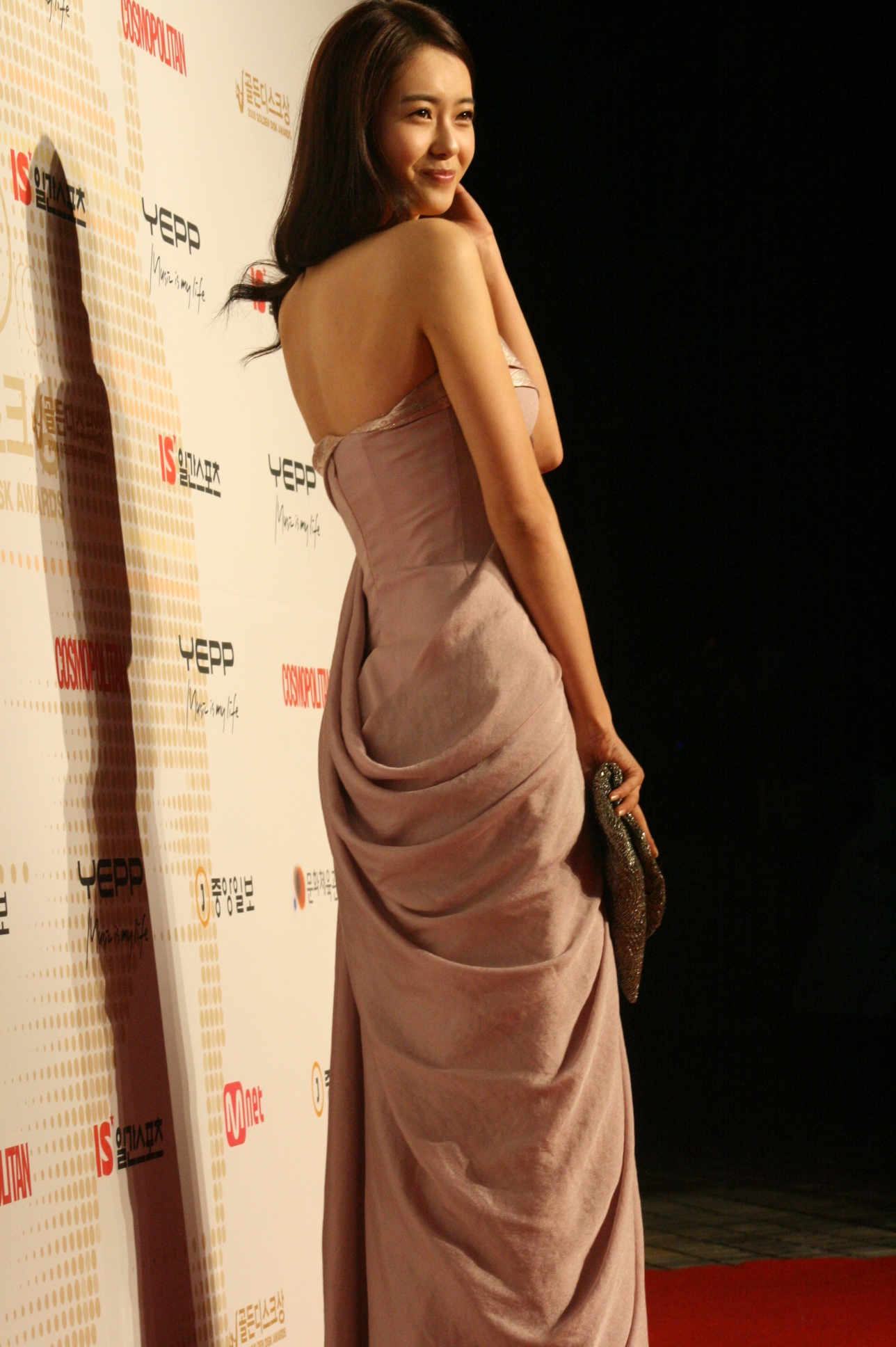
Go at the 23rd Golden Disc Awards in December 2008

In 2008, she was cast in the MBC drama Who Are You? opposite Yoon Kye-sang. Despite low ratings in Korea, the body swap comedy drew in international fans, increasing her Korean Wave profile. This led to an appearance in the Japanese television drama Karei naru Spy.

In 2009, she was cast in MBC's romantic comedy Heading to the Ground with idol singer Jung Yunho from DBSK.

In 2012, Go made her domestic film debut in sports film Pacemaker, where she gained 5 kg weight to portray a pole vaulter representing South Korea. She then displayed her singing skills in the 2012 multicultural film Papa, with Park Yong-woo. Go drew attention for her singing and dancing abilities, fluent English and acting performance in the film.

=== 2013–present: Career resurgence ===
Go's popularity further rose through the nostalgic campus drama Reply 1994 (2013). In order to portray Sung Na-jung, she cut her hair short, and gained 18 lbs. While many doubted her casting when it was first announced, Go's acting later nabbed praise both critically and with viewers. For her performance, Go received Best Actress nominations in the Baeksang Art Awards and APAN Star Awards. She next starred as the sole female rookie detective in the 2014 police drama You're All Surrounded, alongside Lee Seung-gi and Cha Seung-won.

In 2015, Go returned to the big screen alongside Yoo Seung-ho in joseon-era romance film, The Magician, where she plays a princess who finds love with a circus magician. This was followed by a leading role in Phantom Detective, a neo-noir action flick starring Lee Je-hoon as the titular Hong Gil-dong.

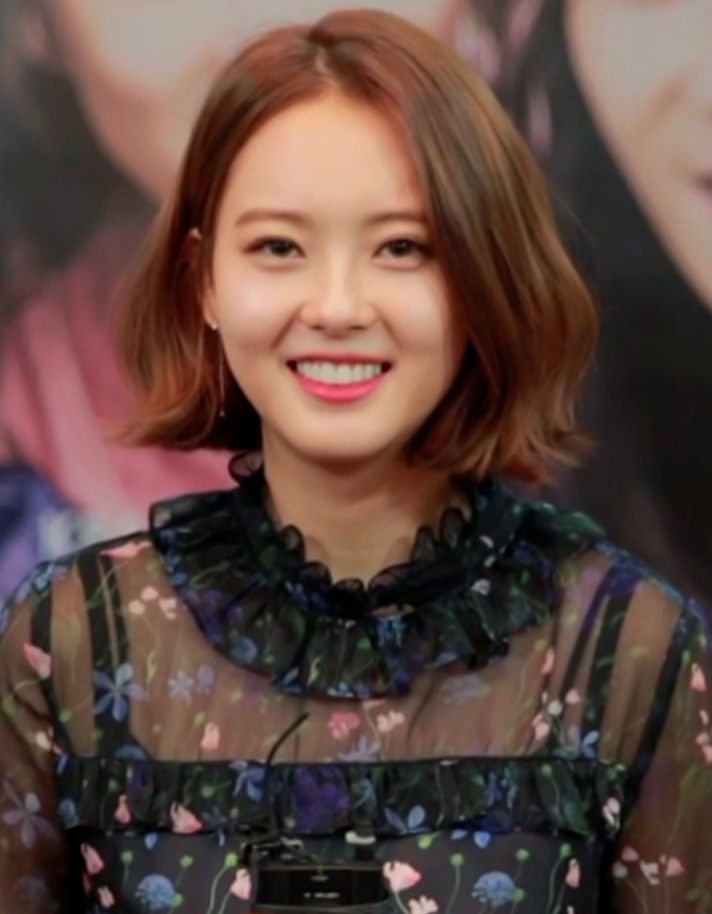
Go in 2017

In 2016, Go starred as the female lead opposite Park Seo-joon in youth historical drama Hwarang: The Poet Warrior Youth. The same year, she left SM Entertainment after 13 years and signed with newly formed management agency Artist Company in January 2017. She then starred in the fantasy thriller drama Black alongside Song Seung-heon, playing a woman who can foresee death.

In 2018, Go starred in the legal drama Ms. Hammurabi alongside Kim Myung-soo, playing a passionate rookie judge. The series was well-received for its honest depiction of adversities in modern-day Korean society; and Go was complimented for her acting.

In 2019, Go starred in the historical action drama Haechi, playing a detective who is well versed in both martial arts and foreign languages.

In 2020, Go starred in the music romance drama Do Do Sol Sol La La Sol as a pianist who hits rock bottom following her family's downfall alongside Lee Jae-wook.

In January 2023, Go signed with King Kong by Starship.

== Personal life ==
On March 7, 2019, Go's agency reported that during the filming of Haechi, Go ruptured her anterior talofibular ligament, which resulted in her being hospitalised.

== Filmography ==
=== Film ===
| Year | Title | Role | Ref. |
|---|---|---|---|
| 2007 | Genghis Khan: To the Ends of the Earth and Sea | Mistress Khulan | |
| 2009 | Dance, Subaru! | Liz Park | |
| 2012 | Pacemaker | Yoo Ji-won | |
| 2012 | Papa | June | |
| 2015 | The Magician | Princess Cheongmyeong | |
| 2016 | Phantom Detective | President Hwang | |
| 2023 | The Childe | Yoon-Ju | |

=== Television series ===
| Year | Title | Role | Notes | Ref. |
|---|---|---|---|---|
| 2003–2005 | Sharp 1 | Lee Ok-rim | | |
| 2005–2006 | Sharp 2 | Lee Ok-rim | | |
| 2006–2007 | Snow Flower | Yoo Da-mi | | |
| 2008 | Who Are You? | Son Young-in | | |
| 2009 | Karei naru Spy | Shin Yoon-ah | Cameo (Episode 3) | |
| 2009 | Heading to the Ground | Kang Hae-bin | | |
| 2013 | Reply 1994 | Sung Na-jung | | |
| 2014 | You're All Surrounded | Eo Soo-sun | | |
| 2015 | The Producers | Herself | Cameo (Episode 8) | |
| 2015–2016 | Reply 1988 | Sung Na-jung | Cameo (Episode 18) | |
| 2016–2017 | Hwarang: The Poet Warrior Youth | Aro | | |
| 2017 | Black | Kang Ha-ram | | |
| 2018 | Ms. Hammurabi | Park Cha Oh-reum | | |
| 2019 | Haechi | Chun Yeo-ji | | |
| 2020 | Hospital Playlist | Herself | Cameo (Episode 5–6) | |
| 2020 | Do Do Sol Sol La La Sol | Goo Ra-ra | | |

=== Web series ===
| Year | Title | Role | Ref. |
|---|---|---|---|
| 2024 | The Scandal of Chunhwa | Princess Hwari | |

=== Music video appearances ===
| Year | Title | Singer | From the Album | Ref. |
|---|---|---|---|---|
| 2004 | "Hug" | TVXQ | Tri-Angle | |
| 2005 | "La'Tale" | | | |
| 2007 | "Innocent Blue" | Mink | | |
| 2011 | "Before U Go" | TVXQ | Keep Your Head Down | |
| 2011 | "Juliette" (Japanese ver) | SHINee | The First | |
| 2015 | "A Million Pieces" | Cho Kyuhyun | Fall, Once Again | |

== Discography ==
=== Soundtrack appearances ===
| Year | Title | From the Album | Ref. |
|---|---|---|---|
| 2012 | "Now" | Papa OST | |
| 2012 | "Little Girl Dreams" | Papa OST | |
| 2013 | "Start" | Reply 1994 OST | |

== Ambassadorship ==
| Year | Title | Ref. |
|---|---|---|
| 2005 | Ambassador of Farming and Forestry | |
| 2008 | Swiss Friend, an ambassador of Switzerland by Switzerland Tourism | |
| 2013– Present | Good Neighbors (NGO) Goodwill Ambassador | |
| 2014–2015 | Seoul Metropolitan PR Ambassador | |
| 2015 | Seoul Police Goodwill Ambassador | |
| 2016 | Ambassador for the Korean Air Force | |

== Awards and nominations ==
Name of the award ceremony, year presented, category, nominee of the award, and the result of the nomination
| Award ceremony | Year | Category | Nominee / Work | Result | Ref. |
|---|---|---|---|---|---|
| André Kim Best Star Awards | 2007 | New Star Award | Go Ara | Won | |
| APAN Star Awards | 2014 | Excellence Award, Actress in a Miniseries | Reply 1994 | Nominated | |
| APAN Star Awards | 2018 | Excellence Award, Actress in a Miniseries | Ms. Hammurabi | Nominated | |
| APAN Star Awards | 2020 | Popular Star Award, Actress | Do Do Sol Sol La La Sol | Nominated | |
| Asia Artist Awards | 2020 | Popularity Award (Actress) | Go Ara | Nominated | |
| Baeksang Arts Awards | 2007 | Best New Actress – Television | Snow Flower | Won | |
| Baeksang Arts Awards | 2010 | Most Popular Actress (Film) | Heading to the Ground | Nominated | |
| Baeksang Arts Awards | 2012 | Best New Actress – Film | Papa | Nominated | |
| Baeksang Arts Awards | 2014 | Best Actress – Television | Reply 1994 | Nominated | |
| Baeksang Arts Awards | 2014 | Most Popular Actress (TV) | Reply 1994 | Nominated | |
| Blue Dragon Film Awards | 2012 | Best New Actress | Papa | Nominated | |
| Buil Film Awards | 2012 | Best New Actress | Papa | Nominated | |
| Buil Film Awards | 2023 | Popular Star Award | The Childe | Nominated | |
| Grand Bell Awards | 2012 | Best New Actress | Pacemaker | Nominated | |
| KBS Drama Awards | 2004 | Best Young Actress | Sharp 1 | Won | |
| KBS Drama Awards | 2017 | Excellence Award, Actress in a Mid-length Drama | Hwarang: The Poet Warrior Youth | Nominated | |
| KBS Drama Awards | 2020 | Best Couple Award | Go Ara with Lee Jae-wook; Do Do Sol Sol La La Sol | Nominated | |
| KBS Drama Awards | 2020 | Excellence Award, Actress in a Miniseries | Do Do Sol Sol La La Sol | Nominated | |
| KBS Drama Awards | 2020 | Netizen Award, Actress | Do Do Sol Sol La La Sol | Nominated | |
| Korea Broadcasting Awards | 2021 | Popularity Award | Do Do Sol Sol La La Sol | Nominated | |
| Korea Film Actors Association Awards | 2016 | Popularity Award | Phantom Detective | Won | |
| Korea Sharing National Awards | 2017 | Minister of Health and Welfare Award | Go Ara | Won | |
| Korean Advertising Association (KAA) | 2008 | Best Advertising Model Award | Go Ara | Won | |
| MBC Drama Awards | 2008 | Best New Actress | Who Are You? | Nominated | |
| Mnet 20's Choice Awards | 2012 | Barbie Girl | Go Ara | Won | |
| SBS Drama Awards | 2006 | New Star Award | Snow Flower | Won | |
| SBS Drama Awards | 2014 | Best Couple Award | Go Ara with Lee Seung-gi; You're All Surrounded | Nominated | |
| SBS Drama Awards | 2014 | Excellence Award, Actress in a Drama Special | You're All Surrounded | Nominated | |
| SBS Drama Awards | 2014 | Netizen Award, Actress | You're All Surrounded | Nominated | |
| SBS Drama Awards | 2019 | Best Couple Award | Go Ara with Jung Il-woo; Haechi | Nominated | |
| SBS Drama Awards | 2019 | Top Excellence Award, Actress in a Mid-length Drama | Haechi | Nominated | |
| SM Entertainment's 5th Anniversary Teen Model Contest | 2003 | —N/a | Go Ara | Won | |
| Style Icon Awards | 2014 | Top 10 Style Icons | Go Ara | Won | |
| tvN10 Awards | 2016 | Best Kiss Award | Go Ara with Jung Woo; Reply 1994 | Nominated | |
| tvN10 Awards | 2016 | Made in tvN, Actress in Drama | Reply 1994 | Nominated | |
| Weibo TV Series Awards | 2020 | Popular Overseas Drama Stars | Do Do Sol Sol La La Sol | Nominated | |
