= The Neighbors (2012 film) =

- Film poster
- Hangul: 이웃사람
- RR: Iutsaram
- MR: Iussaram
- Directed by: Kim Hwi
- Written by: Kim Hwi
- Based on: The Neighbor by Kang Full
- Produced by: Gu Seong-mok; Park Jeong-hyeok; Lee Yong-ho
- Starring: Kim Yunjin; Ma Dong-seok; Kim Sae-ron; Kim Sung-kyun; Chun Ho-jin
- Cinematography: Jung Seong-wook
- Edited by: Jin Lee
- Music by: Shin Yi-gyeong
- Distributed by: Lotte Entertainment
- Release date: August 23, 2012
- Running time: 110 minutes
- Country: South Korea
- Language: Korean
- Box office: US$13.8 million

The Neighbors (Korean: 이웃사람; also known as My Neighbor) is a 2012 South Korea mystery thriller film starring Kim Yunjin in the lead role. In the film, residents of an apartment building suspect that one of their neighbors may be a serial killer responsible for the murder of a residing family's daughter. As the victim's stepmother investigates, the killer begins to target another young girl.

Based on Kang Full's eponymous webtoon, the film sold over 2.43 million tickets, becoming the highest grossing film among the movie adaptations of Kang Full's works.

== Plot ==
What would you do if you found out someone living in your building is a serial killer? A man, whose identity is known, kills his own neighbors ― including a middle-school girl ― living in his building, and continues to stay there even after committing the grisly murders.

All the neighbors in the film are reluctant to act due to self-interest. One character does not want the property price to fall after a scandal. Another wants to avoid attention from the police, as he has just five months left before his statute of limitations runs out. Some simply do not want to meddle without evidence, clinging to their daily routines. Meanwhile, the criminal continues to kill.

== Cast ==
- Kim Yunjin as Song Kyung-hee, stepmother of dead girl
- Ma Dong-seok as Ahn Hyuk-mo, ex-con and loan shark
- Kim Sae-ron as Won Yeo-seon (first victim) / Yoo Soo-yeon
- Kim Sung-kyun as Ryu Seung-hyuk, crew man of fishing vessel
- Im Ha-ryong as Kim Sang-young
- Do Ji-han as Ahn Sang-yoon
- Jang Young-nam as Ha Tae-seon
- Chun Ho-jin as Pyo Jong-rok
- Kim Jung-tae as Kim Jong-guk, ghost
- Jung In-gi as Kim Hong-jung, Ahn Hyuk-mo's uncle
- Kim Ki-cheon as Hwang Jae-yeon, security guard 1
- Cha Hyeon-woo as Detective Lee
- Kwak Min-seok as Ahn Dong-joo, pizza store owner
- Cha Kwang-soo as Won Jung-man, Won Yeo-seon's father

== Awards and nominations ==
2012 Grand Bell Awards

- Best New Actor - Kim Sung-kyun

2012 Korean Association of Film Critics Awards

- Best New Actor - Kim Sung-kyun

2012 Blue Dragon Film Awards

- Nomination - Best New Director - Kim Hwi
- Nomination - Best Supporting Actor - Ma Dong-seok
- Nomination - Best Supporting Actress - Jang Young-nam

2012 Busan Film Critics Awards

- Best New Actor - Kim Sung-kyun

2013 Baeksang Arts Awards

- Best Supporting Actor - Ma Dong-seok
- Nomination - Best New Director - Kim Hwi

2013 Buil Film Awards

- Nomination - Best Supporting Actor - Ma Dong-seok

== See also ==
- Law
- Crime
- Murder
- Abuse
- Child abuse
