= Park Mun-su =

Korean government official (1691–1756)

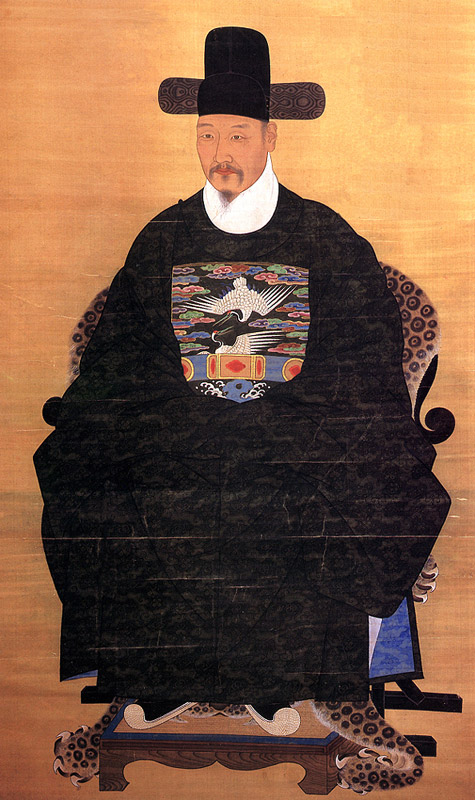
- Portrait of Park Mun-su
- Born: October 28, 1691; Joseon
- Died: 1756 (aged 65); Joseon
- Spouses: Lady Kim of the Cheongpung Kim clan; Lady Yi of the Jeonju Yi clan
- Parents: Park Hang-han (father); Lady Yi (mother)
- Family: Goryeong Park clan

- Korean name
- Hangul: 박문수
- Hanja: 朴文秀
- RR: Bak Munsu
- MR: Pak Munsu

Art name
- Hangul: 기은
- Hanja: 耆隱
- RR: Gieun
- MR: Kiŭn

Courtesy name
- Hangul: 성보
- Hanja: 成甫
- RR: Seongbo
- MR: Sŏngbo

Posthumous name
- Hangul: 충헌
- Hanja: 忠憲
- RR: Chungheon
- MR: Ch'unghŏn

Park Mun-su (Korean: 박문수; Hanja: 朴文秀; October 28, 1691–1756), also known as Bak Munsu, was a Korean government official in the period of King Yeongjo in the Joseon period. He was famous for the lifetime he spent protecting the Korean people from corrupt royal officials.

Park passed the state examination in 1723 and later became a secret royal inspector (Amhaengeosa; 暗行御史, 암행어사). He is the most famous secret inspector in the history of Korea, and has become something of a legendary figure, with many legends surrounding his achievements.

Bak was the son of Park Hang-han, and a member of the Goryeong Park clan. His art name was Gieun, his courtesy name was Seongbo, and his posthumous name was Chungheon.

Two portraits of Park Mun-su have been preserved and are in good condition.

== Popular culture ==
- Portrayed by Yoo Jun-sang in the 2002 MBC TV series Inspector Park Moon-soo.
- Portrayed by Lee Won-jong in the 2014 SBS TV series Secret Door.
- Portrayed by Kwon Yul in the 2019 SBS TV series Haechi.
