= Nameless Gangster: Rules of the Time =

2012 South Korean crime period film

- Theatrical release poster
- Hangul: 범죄와의 전쟁
- Hanja: 犯罪와의 戰爭
- RR: Beomjoewaui jeonjaeng
- MR: Pŏmjoewaŭi chŏnjaeng
- Directed by: Yoon Jong-bin
- Written by: Yoon Jong-bin
- Produced by: Park Shin-gyoo; Yoo Jeong-hoon
- Starring: Choi Min-sik; Ha Jung-woo
- Cinematography: Go Nak-seon
- Edited by: Kim Sang-bum; Kim Jae-bum
- Music by: Jo Yeong-wook
- Production companies: Palette Pictures; Showbox
- Distributed by: Showbox
- Release date: February 2, 2012
- Running time: 133 minutes
- Country: South Korea
- Language: Korean
- Budget: US$4 million
- Box office: US$33.6 million

Nameless Gangster: Rules of the Time (Korean: 범죄와의 전쟁: 나쁜놈들 전성시대; lit. 'War on Crime: The Golden Age of the Bad Guys') is a 2012 South Korean gangster film directed by Yoon Jong-bin starring Choi Min-sik and Ha Jung-woo. The film is set in the 1980s and ’90s in Busan when corruption and crime was so rampant that the government declared war on it in 1990.

Time praised the film, calling it "the Korean mob film Martin Scorsese would be proud of."

== Plot ==
South Korea, 13 October 1990. Following President Roh Tae-woo's declaration of a crackdown on organized crime, Busan businessman Choi Ik-hyun is arrested for embezzling billions of won from hotel construction companies, and is also charged with intimidation, kidnapping and assault. Busan public prosecutor Jo Beom-seok is in charge of the investigation, and especially the murder of hotel owner Heo Sam-shik by mobster Kim Pan-ho, with whom Ik-hyun allegedly was connected.

Back in March 1982, Choi was a Busan customs officer who, along with colleagues, was already taking bribes and pilfering goods. After discovering 10 kilograms of hiropon (crystal meth) in a warehouse one night, he and colleague Mr. Jang approach a friend of Jang's, gangster Choi Hyung-bae, to sell it to Japan's yakuza, with whom Hyung-bae has ties. Ik-hyun discovers that the younger Hyung-bae is also a member of the same Choi family clan from Gyeongju and the two form a close relationship. Ik-hyun leaves his customs job and becomes a full-time businessman, with Hyung-bae taking care of the underworld side and Ik-hyun protecting him with his high-level contacts.

In the mid-'80s the two forcibly take over a nightclub run by Miss Yeo that is on the turf of Pan-ho. Following his humiliation, Pan-ho has the club raided by the police and Hyung-bae arrested, though Ik-hyun gets Hyung-bae released by using the Choi clan connection with Seoul public prosecutor Choi Joo-dong. In May 1987, Ik-hyun and Hyung-bae take their business to the next level, formally linking up with Japan's Yakuza and having a connection with a hotel-casino, the Daedong, that is also on Pan-ho's turf. Pan-ho puts a hit out on Hyung-bae and Ik-hyun and threatens a gang war, and Ik-hyun is forced to decide where his loyalties and self-survival lie.

Out of desperation, Ik-hyun meets up with Pan-ho without Hyung-bae's knowledge to solve the issues between the two gangs, and one of Pan-ho's men tries to kill Hyung-bae shortly after. A paranoid Hyung-bae, who has become increasingly annoyed by Ik-hyun trying to overpower him, has Ik-Hyun beaten up and kicked out of the gang with a stern warning. When Ik-hyun is arrested by the prosecutor, he finally reveals all his connections to the underworld in order to save himself. However, he seemingly only reveals the whereabouts of Pan-ho, who has been hiding away from the authorities. In order to survive, Hyung-bae reconciles with Ik-hyun and they plan to escape together after Ik-hyun has his family sent away to America. However, as they are escaping Busan, the authorities catch up to them. It turns out that Ik-hyun had revealed Hyung-bae's whereabouts as well and has been playing him all along. Hyung-bae tries to kill Ik-hyun out of frustration but he is arrested and taken away. The prosecutor is given an award by the president for bringing down organized crime in Busan.

Twenty years later, Ik-hyun's son is now a law graduate from Seoul University and has joined the prosecutor's office. Despite having escaped the law and living a life of luxury, Ik-hyun is still suffering from guilt over how he betrayed Hyung-bae. While Ik-hyun is celebrating his first grandson's birthday with the rest of the family, Hyung-bae's voice is heard. Ik-hyun turns to face the camera and the screen turns to black.

== Cast ==
- Choi Min-sik as Choi Ik-hyun
- Ha Jung-woo as Choi Hyung-bae, a gang boss
- Cho Jin-woong as Kim Pan-ho, a gang boss
- Kwak Do-won as Jo Beom-seok, a public prosecutor
- Ma Dong-seok as Mr. Kim, brother-in-law of Ik-hyun
- Kim Sung-kyun as Park Chang-woo, Hyung-bae's gang underboss
- Kim Jong-goo as Jo Bong-goo, a customs chief officer
- Kim Jong-soo as Mr. Jang, a customs officer
- Kwon Tae-won as Heo Sam-shik, co-owner of the nightclub
- Kim Hye-eun as Miss Yeo, co-owner of the nightclub
- Kim Eung-soo as Choi Joo-dong, a public prosecutor
- Song Young-chang as Mr. Han, a lawyer
- Takeshi Nakajima as Jaidoku Ganeyama, a yakuza boss
- Lee Cheol-min as Hyung-bae's gang member
- Go In-beom as Choi Moo-il, Hyung-bae's father
- Kim Young-sun as wife of Ik-hyun
- Lee Ji-ha as Bag carrier
- Park Byung-eun as adult Choi Joo-han, son of Ik-hyun
- Yoo Jae-myung as Detective Kim
- Oh Man-seok (1965) as prosecutor
- Lee Cheol-min as gang member and driver

== Production ==
Choi Min-sik reportedly put on 10 kilograms for his role and Ha Jung-woo spent 8 hours putting on the fake body tattoos featured in the film.

== Soundtrack ==
Original Motion Picture Soundtrack from Nameless Gangster: Rules of the Time

Soundtrack album by Jo Yeong-wook
- Released: February 20, 2012
- Genres: Pop, rock
- Label: Ohgam Entertainment
- Producers: Jo Yeong-wook; Hong Dae-seong; Jeong Hyun-soo; Seok Seung-hee

The film's soundtrack was released on February 20, 2012. Jo Yeong-wook, whose credits include Thirst, Oldboy, and Public Enemy, served as the music director, and composed 22 score tracks. Also included was an old K-pop song that was reflective of the era in which the film is set, "I Heard a Rumor" (Korean: 풍문으로 들었소), which was originally sung by 1980s rock band Hahm Joong-ah and the Yankees (Korean: 함중아와 양키스). The cover version sung by rock band Jang Ki-ha and the Faces played during the end credits sequence of the film, and was released on January 13, 2012 as a single.

=== Track listing ===
1. War on Crime Part 1 (범죄와의 전쟁 Part 1) – 2:33
2. Year 1982 (1982년) – 2:28
3. Ourselves (우리끼리) – 1:55
4. Thugs (양아치) – 2:53
5. Memories of a Beach (해변의 추억) – 4:03
6. Road (길) – 1:52
7. Gangsters (건달들) – 2:28
8. War on Crime Part 2 (범죄와의 전쟁 Part 2) – 2:16
9. Pedigree (족보) – 2:48
10. Road of the War – 1:45
11. Crossroad (교차로) – 2:38
12. Target (타겟) – 2:15
13. To Another World (또 다른 세상으로) – 3:02
14. Cold Wall (차가운 벽) – 1:33
15. God of Lobbying (로비의 신) – 2:03
16. War on Crime Part 3 (범죄와의 전쟁 Part 3) – 4:10
17. Profitable Suggestion (유익한 제안) – 2:52
18. Dead-end Road (막다른 길) – 2:05
19. War on Crime Part 4 (범죄와의 전쟁 Part 4) – 5:49
20. Sun Filled (태양은 가득히) – 1:54
21. In My Soul of Souls – 4:21
22. War on Crime Part 5 (범죄와의 전쟁 Part 5) – 2:44
23. I Heard a Rumor (풍문으로 들었소) – 3:16

== Reception ==
Nameless Gangster attracted over 4 million admissions in 26 days of release. It drew 1 million in four days, 2.5 million in 11 days, 3 million in 17 days, and 3.5 million in 20 days. According to data provided by Korean Film Council (KOFIC) it topped the list of ten most-watched films in South Korea in the first quarter of 2012, with a total of 4.6 million admissions.

Its success is notable as it was screened in February (traditionally a low season for movies), rated R, and screened less frequently due to its long running time of 133 minutes. Korean Film Biz Zone stated "the film has elements working against it for box office success. Despite that, "the return of" Choi Min-sik melded with top-rated actor of the day Ha Jung-woo is impressive. The two actors' presence is backed up by a solid supporting cast, giving the film a distinct flavor of a gangster classic."

The film ranked #1 for three weeks, two of which were consecutive. It grossed ₩8 billion in its first week of release, and grossed a total of ₩36 billion after nine weeks of screening.

On review aggregation website Rotten Tomatoes the film has 4 reviews, all are positive.

== In popular culture ==
The film spawned many memorable scenes and lines and has been parodied in many popular variety shows on TV, such as Gag Concert and Infinite Challenge. Comedians would mimick the film characters' hairstyle and fashion and the phrase sara itne (살아 있네, akin to meaning 'fresh') used by Choi Min-sik's character. The song "I Heard a Rumor" also became popular. It was also parodied by members of the boy band Shinhwa in their 2013 Shinhwa Grand Finale: The Classic in Seoul concerts in August 2013.

The overt use of the Busan dialect in dialogs, particularly by gangsters and their associates, gained much attention and increased viewers' interest in regional dialects. The use of regional dialect has historically been frowned upon and viewed as being "backwards", especially in media and broadcasting, and the Seoul dialect is the standard and prestige dialect. Most of the lead and supporting actors portraying the gangsters, aside from Cho Jin-woong, were not from the Busan metropolitan area and had to learn the dialect from scratch for several months prior to filming. Choi and his co-star Ha Jung-woo later compared learning the dialect to learning a foreign language.

== Awards and nominations ==
Year	Award	Category	Recipients	Result	Ref.
2012	48th Baeksang Arts Awards	Best Film	Nameless Gangster: Rules of the Time	Nominated	
2012	48th Baeksang Arts Awards	Best Director	Yoon Jong-bin	Nominated	
2012	48th Baeksang Arts Awards	Best Actor	Choi Min-sik	Nominated	
2012	48th Baeksang Arts Awards	Best Screenplay	Yoon Jong-bin	Nominated	
2012	48th Baeksang Arts Awards	Best New Actor	Kim Sung-kyun	Won	
2012	48th Baeksang Arts Awards	Best New Actress	Kim Hye-eun	Nominated	
2012	21st Buil Film Awards	Best Film	Nameless Gangster: Rules of the Time	Nominated	
2012	21st Buil Film Awards	Best Director	Yoon Jong-bin	Nominated	
2012	21st Buil Film Awards	Best Actor	Choi Min-sik	Won	
2012	21st Buil Film Awards	Best Actor	Ha Jung-woo	Nominated	
2012	21st Buil Film Awards	Best Supporting Actor	Cho Jin-woong	Won	
2012	21st Buil Film Awards	Best Supporting Actor	Kwak Do-won	Nominated	
2012	21st Buil Film Awards	Best Screenplay	Yoon Jong-bin	Nominated	
2012	21st Buil Film Awards	Best New Actor	Kim Sung-kyun	Won	
2012	21st Buil Film Awards	Best New Actress	Kim Hye-eun	Nominated	
2012	21st Buil Film Awards	Best Cinematography	Go Nak-seon	Nominated	
2012	21st Buil Film Awards	Best Art Direction	Cho Hwa-sung	Nominated	
2012	21st Buil Film Awards	Best Music	Jo Yeong-wook	Nominated	
2012	49th Grand Bell Awards	Best Actor	Choi Min-sik	Nominated	
2012	49th Grand Bell Awards	Best Supporting Actor	Kim Sung-kyun	Nominated	
2012	49th Grand Bell Awards	Best New Actor	Kim Sung-kyun	Nominated	
2012	32nd Korean Association of Film Critics Awards	Best Screenplay	Yoon Jong-bin	Won	
2012	6th Asia Pacific Screen Awards	Best Feature Film	Nameless Gangster: Rules of the Time	Nominated	
2012	6th Asia Pacific Screen Awards	Best Actor	Choi Min-sik	Won	
2012	33rd Blue Dragon Film Awards	Best Film	Nameless Gangster: Rules of the Time	Nominated	
2012	33rd Blue Dragon Film Awards	Best Director	Yoon Jong-bin	Nominated	
2012	33rd Blue Dragon Film Awards	Best Actor	Choi Min-sik	Won	
2012	33rd Blue Dragon Film Awards	Best Actor	Ha Jung-woo	Nominated	
2012	33rd Blue Dragon Film Awards	Popularity Award	Ha Jung-woo	Won	
2012	33rd Blue Dragon Film Awards	Best Supporting Actor	Kwak Do-won	Nominated	
2012	33rd Blue Dragon Film Awards	Best Screenplay	Yoon Jong-bin	Won	
2012	33rd Blue Dragon Film Awards	Best New Actor	Kim Sung-kyun	Nominated	
2012	33rd Blue Dragon Film Awards	Best Music	Jo Yeong-wook	Won	
2012	33rd Blue Dragon Film Awards	Best Cinematography	Go Nak-seon	Nominated	
2012	33rd Blue Dragon Film Awards	Best Art Direction	Cho Hwa-sung	Nominated	
2012	33rd Blue Dragon Film Awards	Best Lighting	Lee Seung-won	Nominated	
2012	20th Korean Culture and Entertainment Awards	Best New Actor	Kim Sung-kyun	Won	
2012	13th Busan Film Critics Awards	Best Film	Nameless Gangster: Rules of the Time	Won	
2013	4th KOFRA Film Awards	Best Actor	Choi Min-sik	Won	
2013	7th Asian Film Awards	Best Actor	Choi Min-sik	Nominated	
2013	7th Asian Film Awards	Best Supporting Actor	Ha Jung-woo	Nominated	
2013	7th Asian Film Awards	Best Newcomer	Kim Sung-kyun	Nominated	
2013	7th Asian Film Awards	Best Screenplay	Yoon Jong-bin	Nominated	
2013	7th Asian Film Awards	Best Art Direction	Cho Hwa-sung	Nominated	
2013	7th Asian Film Awards	Best Original Score	Jo Yeong-wook	Nominated	
