= Masquerade (2012 film) =

2012 South Korean film by Choo Chang-min

- Film poster
- Hangul: 광해: 왕이 된 남자
- Hanja: 光海: 王이 된 男子
- RR: Gwanghae: wangi doen namja
- MR: Kwanghae: wangi toen namja
- Directed by: Choo Chang-min
- Written by: Hwang Jo-yoon
- Produced by: Im Sang-jin; Won Dong-yeon; Kim Ho-Sung; Miky Lee
- Starring: Lee Byung-hun; Ryu Seung-ryong; Han Hyo-joo
- Cinematography: Lee Tae-yoon
- Edited by: Nam Na-yeong
- Music by: Mowg; Kim Jun-seong
- Distributed by: CJ Entertainment
- Release date: September 13, 2012
- Running time: 131 minutes
- Country: South Korea
- Language: Korean
- Budget: ₩9.5 billion
- Box office: US$94.3 million

Masquerade (Korean: 광해: 왕이 된 남자; lit. 'Gwanghae: The Man Who Became King') is a 2012 South Korean period drama film starring Lee Byung-hun in dual role as the bizarre King Gwanghae and the humble acrobat Ha-sun, who stands in for the monarch when he faces the threat of being poisoned.

With 12.3 million tickets sold, Masquerade is the ninth highest-grossing South Korean film. Also, it swept the 49th Grand Bell Awards, winning in 15 categories, including Best Film, Director, Screenplay and Actor.

== Plot ==
The confusing and conspiratorial 15th ruler of Korea's Joseon Dynasty King Gwang-hae (Lee Byung-hun) orders his Secretary of Defense, Heo Gyun (Ryu Seung-ryong), to find him a double in order to avoid the constant threat of assassination. In constant fear of being poisoned, the king becomes obnoxious and threatens everyone around him, including the kitchen maids. Heo gyun finds Ha-sun, a lowly acrobat and bawdy joker who looks remarkably like the king to replace the king occasionally whenever the king is out of the palace. In few days, just as feared, King Gwang-hae is drugged with Poppy by his favorite consort, conspired by the law minister. Heo Gyun proposes Ha-sun fill the role as the king until King Gwang-hae fully recovers and grooms Ha-sun to look and act like the king. While assuming the role of the king at his first official appearance, Ha-sun begins to ponder the intricacies of the problems debated in his court. Being fundamentally more humanitarian than King Gwang-hae, Ha-sun's affection and appreciation of even the most minor servants slowly changes morale in the palace for the better. Over time he finds his voice and takes control of governing the country with real insight and fair judgments. Even Heo Gyun and the Chief Eunuch are moved by Ha-sun's genuine concern for the people, and realize he is a better ruler than Gwang-hae. Ha-sun even fights for the respect of the Queen's safety and protects her and her brother from death sentences. However, his chief opposition, Park Chung-seo (Kim Myung-gon), notices the sudden shift in the king's behavior and starts to ask questions. The queen (Han Hyo-joo) is also conflicted between the real king and the fake king's secret. The Chief Eunuch and the Secretary of Defense ask Ha-sun to leave the country for good. The king was again brought back to the throne to punish the revolts.

== Cast ==
- Lee Byung-hun as King Gwanghae/Ha-sun
- Ryu Seung-ryong as Chief Secretary Heo Gyun
- Han Hyo-joo as Queen Consort Yoo
- Jang Gwang as Chief Eunuch Jo
- Kim In-kwon as Captain Do, the king's personal bodyguard
- Shim Eun-kyung as Sa-wol, a food taster
- Park Ji-a as Chief Court Lady Han
- Shin Jung-geun as Lee Jung-rang
- Kim Myung-gon as Interior Minister Park Chung-seo
- Jeon Guk-hyang as Court Lady Jeong
- Yang Joon-mo as Kim Joo-seo
- Moon Chang-gil as the Left state councillors
- Jeon Bae-soo as Hyung-pan
- Do Yong-goo as Byung-pan
- Yoo Soon-woong as Ho-pan
- Lee Yang-hee as Gong-pan
- Park Kyung-geun as a musician
- Shin Woon-sup as Ye-pan
- Kim Jong-goo as Gwanghae's royal physician
- Lee El as Lady Ahn Gae-shi
- Lee Joon-hyuk as a Lord
- Seo Jin-won as General Overseer Do
- Kim Hye-won as Courtesan Pearl
- Kim Hak-joon as Yoo Jung-ho, Queen Yoo's father
- Kim Hye-hwa as Plum Blossom Pot servant
- Kim Seung-hoon as Yi-bang
- Lee Bong-ryun as court woman 1
- Kwon Bang-hyun as court woman 2
- Lee Ran-hee as court woman 3
- Lee Soo-yong as Kal Ja-gook
- Kim Gil-dong as a Military officer
- Kwon Eun-soo as Gwanghae's court lady
- Seo Eun-jung as Gwanghae's court lady
- Joo Young-ho as Gwanghae's astrologist 1
- Jo Sung-hee as Gwanghae's astrologist 2
- Min Jung-gi as Gwanghae's eunuch
- Kim Bi-bi as Queen Yoo's maid

== Background ==
Historically, Gwanghae, the 15th Joseon king from 1608 to 1623, attempted diplomacy through neutrality as China's Ming dynasty (1368–1644) and Qing dynasty (1644–1912) set their sights on the country. He also tried his hand at other reforms and reconstruction to try to make the nation prosperous, including an emphasis on the restoration of documents, but met with opposition and was later deposed and exiled to Jeju Island. Since he was deposed in a coup by the Westerners faction, historians did not give him a temple name like Taejo or Sejong.

The premise behind the film is an interpretation of the missing 15 days in the Seungjeongwon ilgi or Journal of the Royal Secretariat during Gwanghae's reign—designated by his 1616 journal entry, "One must not record that which he wishes to hide." That premise is entirely fictitious in nature. This is because

- The Journal in itself is largely incomplete due to records being destroyed several times and reproductions of the destroyed documents also eventually being destroyed, leading to large missing chunks of records or questionable reproductions that may or may not have been edited every subsequent reproduction.
- Relevant records written during the reign of Gwanghae are also largely missing.
- Even if the Journal were complete, it is highly unlikely the Secretariat would delete or omit records, even by order of the King due to protocol. In fact, due to that same protocol the only thing that would happen is that after having received word or having witnessed a certain incident and subsequently ordered to not record it, the Secretariat would record the incident in full and finish the entry stating the King ordered him not to do so.
- A prime example of the above would be when Taejong fell off his horse when hunting one day and asked the Secretariat to not record this in the journal. The Secretariat however went and recorded the incident and ended his entry with 'and His Majesty asked that the Secretariat not record this'

== Production ==
Announced in early 2011 and initially titled I am the King of Joseon, The Prince and the Pauper-inspired historical film was to be directed by Kang Woo-suk and star Jung Jae-young as Gwanghae/Ha-sun and Yoo Jun-sang as Heo Gyun, but Kang left the project over differences of opinion with production firm CJ E&M.

In November 2011, they were replaced by director Choo Chang-min and actor Lee Byung-hun in his first ever historical film. A month later, Han Hyo-joo was cast as Lee's co-star.

The film was shot at the Namyangju Studio Complex in Gyeonggi Province.

== Reception ==
Called by one review as one of the best South Korean costume dramas in years, the film drew praise for being beautifully written and emotionally involving, as well as for its accomplished acting, sure-handed direction, ambitious scale and commercial appeal. It became the second biggest hit film at the 2012 South Korean box office, attracting 8.2 million admissions in 25 days of release, then 9,091,633 after 31 days. On its 38th day, it became the 7th film in Korean cinema history to surpass the 10 million-milestone attendance. At the end of its theatrical run it was listed as Korea's all-time third highest-grossing film with 12,319,542 tickets sold nationwide (as of April 2015, it is currently sixth).

== Adaptations ==
=== In theater ===
The film was adapted into a stage play which ran at Seoul's Dongsoong Art Center from February 23 to April 21, 2013. It was produced by Lee Byung-hun's agency BH Entertainment. Bae Soo-bin and musical theatre actor Kim Do-hyun alternated in the lead role of Gwanghae. As part of the promotion for the play, Lee, Bae and Kim were featured in a photo spread in the inaugural issue of Grazia Korea, published on February 20, 2013.

=== In television ===
Cable network tvN acquired rights for a television adaptation, starring Yeo Jin-goo. Developed for the station by Studio Dragon and produced by GT:st, it is to air in January 2019. (Note: Both tvN and Studio Dragon are sister entities of the film's distributor, CJ Entertainment, under the CJ Group.)

=== In other media ===
South Korean rapper Agust D draws from the film in his 2020 track Daechwita. The lyrics reference King Gwanghae, as well as rising through the ranks from poverty and servitude to become a king, while in the accompanying music video Agust D portrays a scarred Joseon tyrant, confronted by a modern doppelganger.

== Awards and nominations ==
Year	Award	Category	Recipient	Result
2012	49th Grand Bell Awards	Best Film	Masquerade	Won
2012	49th Grand Bell Awards	Best Director	Choo Chang-min	Won
2012	49th Grand Bell Awards	Best Actor	Lee Byung-hun	Won
2012	49th Grand Bell Awards	Best Supporting Actor	Ryu Seung-ryong	Won
2012	49th Grand Bell Awards	Best Screenplay	Hwang Jo-yoon	Won
2012	49th Grand Bell Awards	Best Cinematography	Lee Tae-yoon	Won
2012	49th Grand Bell Awards	Best Editing	Nam Na-yeong	Won
2012	49th Grand Bell Awards	Best Art Direction	Oh Heung-seok	Won
2012	49th Grand Bell Awards	Best Lighting	Oh Seung-chul	Won
2012	49th Grand Bell Awards	Best Costume Design	Kwon Yu-jin, Im Seung-hee	Won
2012	49th Grand Bell Awards	Best Music	Mowg, Kim Jun-seong	Won
2012	49th Grand Bell Awards	Best Production	Im Sang-jin	Won
2012	49th Grand Bell Awards	Best Visual Effects	Jung Jae-hoon	Won
2012	49th Grand Bell Awards	Best Sound Effects	Lee Sang-joon	Won
2012	49th Grand Bell Awards	Popularity Award	Lee Byung-hun	Won
2012	32nd Korean Association of Film Critics Awards	Best Technical Achievement	Oh Heung-seok	Won
2012	33rd Blue Dragon Film Awards	Best Film	Masquerade	Nominated
2012	33rd Blue Dragon Film Awards	Best Director	Choo Chang-min	Nominated
2012	33rd Blue Dragon Film Awards	Best Actor	Lee Byung-hun	Nominated
2012	33rd Blue Dragon Film Awards	Best Supporting Actor	Jang Gwang	Nominated
2012	33rd Blue Dragon Film Awards	Best Screenplay	Hwang Jo-yoon	Nominated
2012	33rd Blue Dragon Film Awards	Best Cinematography	Lee Tae-yoon	Nominated
2012	33rd Blue Dragon Film Awards	Best Art Direction	Oh Heung-seok	Won
2012	33rd Blue Dragon Film Awards	Best Lighting	Oh Seung-chul	Nominated
2012	33rd Blue Dragon Film Awards	Best Music	Mowg, Kim Jun-seong	Nominated
2012	33rd Blue Dragon Film Awards	Technical Award	Kwon Yu-jin, Im Seung-hee (costume design)	Nominated
2012	33rd Blue Dragon Film Awards	Technical Award	Nam Na-yeong (editing)	Nominated
2012	13th Busan Film Critics Awards	Best Actor	Lee Byung-hun	Won
2013	49th Baeksang Arts Awards	Best Film	Masquerade	Won
2013	49th Baeksang Arts Awards	Best Director	Choo Chang-min	Won
2013	49th Baeksang Arts Awards	Best Actor	Lee Byung-hun	Nominated
2013	22nd Buil Film Awards	Best Film	Masquerade	Nominated
2013	22nd Buil Film Awards	Best Director	Choo Chang-min	Nominated
2013	22nd Buil Film Awards	Best Actor	Lee Byung-hun	Nominated
2013	22nd Buil Film Awards	Best Supporting Actor	Ryu Seung-ryong	Won
2013	22nd Buil Film Awards	Best Art Direction	Kwak Jae-sik, Oh Heung-seok	Nominated
2013	22nd Buil Film Awards	Best Music	Mowg, Kim Jun-seong	Nominated
2013	22nd Buil Film Awards	Buil Readers' Jury Award	Masquerade	Won
2013	7th Asia Pacific Screen Awards	Best Actor	Lee Byung-hun	Won

== See also ==
- I Am a King
- Prem Ratan Dhan Payo
