= Traffickers =

- Hangul: 공모자들
- Hanja: 共謀者들
- RR: Gongmojadeul
- MR: Kongmojadŭl
- Directed by: Kim Hong-sun
- Written by: Kim Sang-myung; Kim Hong-sun
- Produced by: Choi Yeon-ju; Choi Hyeon-muk; Kim Seong-geun
- Starring: Im Chang-jung; Choi Daniel
- Cinematography: Yoon Nam-joo
- Edited by: Shin Min-kyung
- Music by: Kim Jun-seong
- Distributed by: TimeStory/Cinus Entertainment
- Release date: August 30, 2012
- Running time: 110 minutes
- Country: South Korea
- Language: Korean
- Budget: ₩3.0 billion
- Box office: ₩12,240,990,500

Traffickers (Korean: 공모자들; RR: Gongmojadeul) is a 2012 South Korean crime thriller film starring Im Chang-jung, Choi Daniel, Oh Dal-su and Jo Yoon-hee. It takes place in six hours on a passenger boat with an ongoing black market organ-trafficking operation, and a desperate husband out to find his missing wife.

== Plot ==
After his best friend dies in an unexpected accident, the black market dealer Young-gyu decides to wash his hands of his illegal activities and start a new life. He then falls in love with an acquaintance, Yu-Ri, who is unaware of his feelings and of his past. He later learns that Yu-ri needs money for her father's surgery, and she has resorted to procuring the services of a local organ broker, who is Young-gyu's former client. The broker promises to help her secure a legal organ donation but secretly relies on black market dealers like Young-gyu, who engage in multiple kidnappings and killings. To help her out, Young-gyu agrees to do the job one last time when he is once again approached by his former client. His smuggling ring gets back together for a final run, and they resume their M.O. of operating out of a ferry boat that runs between Korea and China, picking victims from among its passengers, abducting them from their rooms, harvesting their organs on board the ship while they are still alive yet restrained, and then brutally disposing of the bodies afterwards.

Meanwhile, a married couple, Sang-ho and Chae-hee (who is disabled and relies on a wheelchair), boards Young-gyu's ferry boat heading to Weihai, China. That very evening, just when the boat enters international waters where countries' laws cannot be enforced, Chae-hee suddenly goes missing, and all her pictures and belongings vanish without a trace. Young-gyu runs into Yu-ri on the same ship, and she claims to be the only witness to Chae-hee's disappearance...

== Cast ==
- Im Chang-jung - Young-gyu
- Choi Daniel - Sang-ho
- Oh Dal-su - Kyung-jae / "Old Man"
- Jo Yoon-hee - Yu-ri
- Jung Ji-yoon - Chae-hee
- Jo Dal-hwan - Joon-sik
- Lee Young-hoon - Dae-woong
- Shin Seung-hwan - Dong-bae
- Choi Il-hwa - Chul-soo
- Lee Moon-soo - Dr. Oh
- Heo Joon-seok - victim in prologue
- Kim Jae-hwa - Gong Choon-ja
- Go Jung-il - customs officer
- Yoon Sang-ho - boat crew member
- Song Yi-joo - Inspector Jang
- Park Se-yeong - Min-seo
- Park Sung-taek - Choi
- Park Il-mok - office head
- Son Jong-hak - company chairman
- Gong Jung-hwan - Yong-chul
- Oh Sang-jin - police station reporter
- Ra Mi-ran - female courier 1
- Shin Hye-jeong - female courier 2

== Awards and nominations ==
2012 Grand Bell Awards

- Nomination - Best New Director - Kim Hong-sun
- Nomination - Best New Actor - Choi Daniel

2012 Blue Dragon Film Awards

- Best New Director - Kim Hong-sun
- Nomination - Best New Actress - Jung Ji-yoon

2012 Korean Culture and Entertainment Awards

- Top Excellence Award, Actor in a Film - Im Chang-jung
