= Reply 1994 =

2013 South Korean television series

- Promotional poster
- Also known as: Answer Me 1994
- Hangul: 응답하라 1994
- Hanja: 應答하라 1994
- RR: Eungdaphara 1994
- MR: Ŭngdaphara 1994
- Genre: Romance; Comedy
- Written by: Lee Woo-jung; Kim Ran-ju
- Directed by: Shin Won-ho
- Starring: Go Ara; Jung Woo; Yoo Yeon-seok; Kim Sung-kyun; Son Ho-jun; Cha Sun-woo; Min Do-hee; Sung Dong-il; Lee Il-hwa
- Country of origin: South Korea
- Original language: Korean
- No. of episodes: 21

Production
- Executive producers: Kathleen Herles; Chris Gifford
- Producer: Lee Myung-han
- Running time: 60–90 minutes
- Production company: tvN

Original release
- Network: tvN
- Release: October 18 – December 28, 2013

Related
- Reply 1997; Reply 1988

Reply 1994 (Korean: 응답하라 1994) is a 2013 South Korean television series and the second installment of the Reply anthology series. It stars Go Ara, Jung Woo, Yoo Yeon-seok, Kim Sung-kyun, Son Ho-jun, Cha Sun-woo, Min Do-hee, Sung Dong-il, and Lee Il-hwa. Set in 1994, it follows six university students who live together at a boarding house in Sinchon, Seoul. It aired on tvN from October 18 to December 28, 2013 for 21 episodes.

Written by Lee Woo-jung and directed by Shin Won-ho, it is one of the highest-rated Korean dramas in cable television history with its final episode garnering an average viewership rating of 11.509%.

== Synopsis ==
Set in 1994, six university students from various provincial areas of South Korea (Jeolla Province, Chungcheong Province and Gyeongsang Province) live together at a boarding house in Sinchon, Seoul, which is run by a couple with a daughter named Sung Na-jung (Go Ara). It follows a nonlinear story telling where it shifts between the past in 1994 and the present in 2013, making the viewers guess who will become Na-jung's husband among the male characters.

The series covers the historical and cultural events that happened in the country in 1994 and the years that followed, including the emergence of seminal K-pop group Seo Taiji and Boys, the Sampoong Department Store collapse and the birth of the Korean Basketball League. The names of the boys are revealed later, to avoid spoilers. They're mostly just referred to by their nicknames listed below.

== Cast ==
=== Main ===
- Go Ara as Sung Na-jung

Originally from Masan, Gyeongnam, she specialise in Computer Engineering at College of Engineering, Yonsei University, has an easygoing personality and is a big fan of Basketball player Lee Sang-min who is the star of KBL.

- Jung Woo as "Sseureki" (meaning "Garbage", "Rubbish" or "Trash")

A medical student at Medical College of Yonsei University. He was the best friend of Na-jung's late older brother, and grew up with the Sung siblings. (Hometown: Masan, Gyeongnam)

- Yoo Yeon-seok as "Chilbong" (meaning "Seven Shut-outs)

Although he is only a freshman, he is the number one pitcher of Yonsei University's Baseball team. He has a crush on Na-jung. (Hometown: Gangnam, Seoul)

- Kim Sung-kyun as "Samcheonpo" (referencing his hometown)

He looks much older than he actually is. He is a student at Department of Engineering, Yonsei University whose specialty is Computer Science. (Hometown: Samcheonpo, Gyeongnam)

- Son Ho-jun as "Haitai" (referencing baseball team Haitai Tigers)

His father is the CEO of the bus company Suncheon Transportation Inc. (Hometown: Suncheon, Jeonnam)

- Cha Sun-woo as "Binggeure" (meaning "Smiley"; referencing baseball team Binggrae Eagles)

Chilbong's cousin, and Garbage's junior in school. (Hometown: Goesan, Chungbuk)

- Min Do-hee as Jo Yoon-jin

A fan of Seo Taiji and Boys, and a quiet, aggressive student. (Hometown: Yeosu, Jeonnam)

- Sung Dong-il as Sung Dong-il

A coach of the baseball team Seoul Ssangdungi, and Na-jung's father.

- Lee Il-hwa as Lee Il-hwa

She runs a boarding house in Seoul along with her husband Dong-il and daughter Na-jung.

=== Supporting ===
- Yook Sung-jae as Sung Joon ("Ssuk-ssuk")
  - Sung Joon (Sung Dong-il's son) as young Sung Joon
- Shin Soo-yeon as young Sung Na-jung
- Yoon Jong-hoon as Kim Ki-tae
- Yeon Joon-seok as Kim Dong-woo
- Lee Bong-ryun as Na-jung's classmate

=== Special appearances ===
- Moon Kyung-eun as himself (ep. 1)
- Woo Ji-won as himself (ep. 1)
- Kim Hoon as himself (ep. 1)
- Hong Seok-cheon as ROTC cadet (ep. 2)
- Na Yeong-seok as Yonsei student boarder (ep. 2)
- Huh Kyung-young as interrogatory student boarder (ep. 2)
- Bae Woo-hee as Ha Hee-ra
- Kim Min-young as Lee Soon-ja (ep. 2)
- Kim Kwang-kyu as Na Chang-seok, Sseureki's professor at the university hospital (ep. 5)
- Kim Jong-min as doctor (ep. 5)
- Lee Joo-yeon as medical student Lee Joo-won (ep. 5)
- Kim Jung-min as himself (ep. 5)
- NC.A as Ssuk-ssuk's girlfriend in 2013 (ep. 6)
- Park Gyeong-ree as one of Na-jung's friends on the group date (ep. 7)
- Park Min-ha as one of Na-jung's friends on the group date (ep. 7)
- Lee Hye-min as one of Na-jung's friends on the group date (ep. 7)
- Lee Yoo-joon as one of Sseureki's friends on the group date (ep. 7)
- Ji Seung-hyun as one of Sseureki's friends on the group date (ep. 7)
- Yang Ki-won as one of Sseureki's friends on the group date (ep. 7)
- Lee Kyung-shil as Dong-il's first love (ep. 8)
- Jung Sung-ho as songwriter (ep. 9)
- Lee Jung-eun as Samcheonpo's mother (ep. 10)
- Choi Deok-moon as Kim Yoon-shik, Samcheonpo's father (ep. 10)
- Jo Yang-ja as Samcheonpo's grandmother (ep. 10)
- Kim Han-jong as Samcheonpo's drunk neighbor (ep. 10)
- Kim In-seo as Haitai's crush (ep. 11)
- Kim Byung-choon as Jung Man-ho, Dong-il's friend (ep. 12)
- Jo Jae-yoon as Kim Jae-young (ep. 12)
- Kim Won-hae as Sseureki's father (ep. 12, 21)
- Seo Yoo-ri as Joo-kyung, Sseureki's first love (ep. 12)
- Kim Min-jong as himself (ep. 13)
- Choi Jong-hoon as sergeant (ep. 14)
- Kim Seul-gi as Sseureki's cousin (ep. 14-15)
- Song Min-ji as Min-jung, Sseureki's coworker (ep. 16–17, 20)
- Yoon Jin-yi as Jin-yi/"Die Die" (ep. 16-17)
- Jung Eun-ji as Sung Shi-won (ep. 16–17, 21)
- Seo In-guk as Yoon Yoon-jae (ep. 16–17, 21)
- Hoya as Kang Joon-hee (ep. 16)
- Lee Si-eon as Bang Sung-jae (ep. 16)
- Shin So-yul as Mo Yoo-jung (ep. 16)
- Eun Ji-won as Do Hak-chan (ep. 17)
- Kim Jae-kyung as "Yonsei's Jun Ji-hyun" (ep. 18)
- Go Woo-ri as "Yonsei's Uhm Jung-hwa" (ep. 18)
- Jun Hyun-moo as Haitai's junior (ep. 18)
- Yoon Min-soo as married man (ep. 18)
- Jo Yun-seo as Ae-jung (ep. 18-19)
- Jung Yu-mi as girl who bumps into Chilbong (ep. 21)

== Production ==
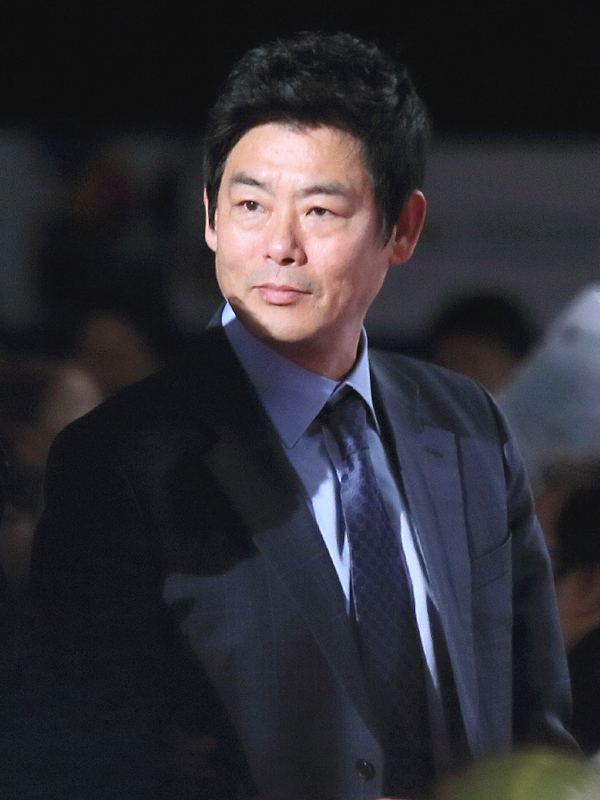
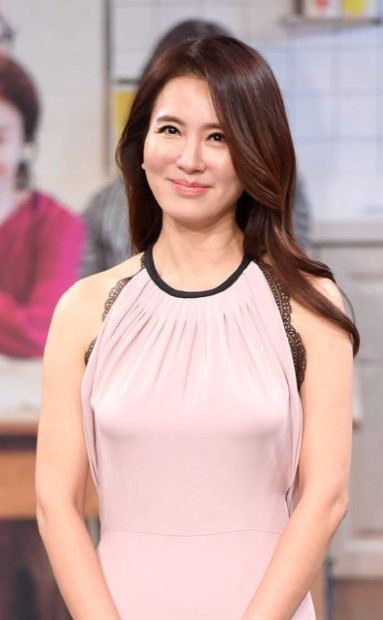
Actors Sung Dong-il and Lee Il-hwa play the parents of the female lead character in each installment of the Reply anthology series

Director Shin Won-ho and writer Lee Woo-jung had originally planned for their previous TV series to be set in 1994, which was the year they entered college (Shin studied Chemical Engineering at Seoul National University). But they decided to change the year to 1997 after casting Sechs Kies member Eun Ji-won, since H.O.T. and Sechs Kies fandom was at its peak that year, which made an interesting juxtaposition to the failing Korean economy during the IMF crisis.

Shin and Lee felt there was enough material for another series, and in a bid to replicate Reply 1997's success, cable channel tvN announced a "sequel" or "second season" in April 2013. Shin said, "The stories about people moving to Seoul are full of unpredictable incidents."

Despite the same writer and director, and the casting of Sung Dong-il and Lee Il-hwa, Reply 1994 is not a prequel of Reply 1997; it uses the same concept of coming-of-age drama combined with 1990s nostalgia, but with a completely new plot and characters. A novelization was published on January 17, 2014.

== Soundtrack ==
Soundtracks for the drama consist of re-arranged popular Korean songs from the nineties. All re-arranged songs are well received by Korean general public and topped various Korean music charts.

=== Part 1 ===
No.	Title	Lyrics	Music	Artist	Length
1.	"Seoul, here (서울 이곳은)"	Kim Soon-gun	Jang Cheol-woong	Roy Kim (Note: Original song by Jang Cheol-woong, released in 1994.)	4:24
2.	"Seoul, Here (서울 이곳은) (Acoustic ver.)"	Kim Soon-gun	Jang Cheol-woong		2:35
3.	"Seoul, Here (서울 이곳은) (Acoustic guitar ver.)"		Jang Cheol-woong		2:35
Total length:					9:34

=== Part 2 ===
No.	Title	Lyrics	Music	Artist	Length
1.	"To You (너에게)"	Seo Taiji	Seo Taiji	Sung Si-kyung (Note: Original song by Seo Taiji, released in 1993.)	3:50
2.	"To You (너에게) (Inst.)"		Seo Taiji		3:50
Total length:					7:40

=== Part 3 ===
No.	Title	Lyrics	Music	Artist	Length
1.	"With You (그대와 함께)"	Son Ji-chang	Seo Young-jin	B1A4 (Note: Original song by The Blue, released in 1994.)	3:11
2.	"With You (그대와 함께) (Inst.)"		Seo Young-jin		3:11
Total length:					6:22

=== Part 4 ===
No.	Title	Lyrics	Music	Artist	Length
1.	"You, I Cannot Have (가질 수 없는 너)"	Jeong Eun-kyung	Jeong Si-ro	Hi.ni (Note: Original song by Bank, released in 1995.)	2:54
2.	"You, I Cannot Have (가질 수 없는 너) (Acoustic ver.)"	Jeong Eun-kyung	Jeong Si-ro	Hi.ni	2:54
3.	"You, I Cannot Have (가질 수 없는 너) (Inst.)"		Jeong Si-ro		2:54
Total length:					8:02

=== Part 5 ===
No.	Title	Lyrics	Music	Artist	Length
1.	"Happy Me (행복한 나를)"	Yoo Yoo-jin	Park Geun-tae	Lim Kim (Note: Original song by E.C.O, released in 1997.)	4:12
2.	"Happy Me (행복한 나를) (Inst.)"		Park Geun-tae		4:12
Total length:					8:24

=== Part 6 ===
No.	Title	Lyrics	Music	Artist	Length
1.	"Parting for Me (날 위한 이별)"	Park Ju-yeon	Kim Hyeong-seok	Dia (Note: Original song by Kim Hye-rim, released in 1994.)	5:06
2.	"Parting for Me (날 위한 이별) (Inst.)"		Kim Hyeong-seok		5:06
Total length:					10:12

=== Part 7 ===
No.	Title	Lyrics	Music	Artist	Length
1.	"Only Feeling You (너만을 느끼며)"	Jiwoo	Seo Young-jin	Jung Woo, Yoo Yeon-seok, Son Ho-jun (Note: Original song by The Blue, released in 1992.)	3:50
2.	"Only Feeling You (너만을 느끼며) (Inst.)"

=== Part 8 ===
No.	Title	Lyrics	Music	Artist	Length
1.	"Start (시작)"	Oh Dong-jun	Oh Dong-jun	Go Ara (Note: Original song by Park Ki-young, released in 1999.)
2.	"Start (시작) (Inst.)"		Oh Dong-jun

=== Reply 1994 Director's Cut OST ===
No.	Title	Lyrics	Music	Artist	Length
1.	"Seoul, Here (서울 이곳은)"	Kim Soon-gun	Jang Cheol-woong	Roy Kim	4:24
2.	"To You (너에게)"	Seo Taiji	Seo Taiji	Sung Si-kyung	3:50
3.	"With You (그대와 함께)"	Son Ji-chang	Seo Young-jin	B1A4	3:11
4.	"You, I Cannot Have (가질 수 없는 너)"	Jeong Eun-kyung	Jeong Si-ro	Hi.ni	2:54
5.	"Happy Me (행복한 나를)"	Yoo Yoo-jin	Park Geun-tae	Lim Kim	4:12
6.	"Parting for Me (날 위한 이별)"	Park Ju-yeon	Kim Hyeong-seok	Dia	5:06
7.	"Only Feeling You (너만을 느끼며)"	Jiwoo	Seo Young-jin	Jung Woo, Yoo Yeon-seok, Son Ho-jun	3:50
8.	"Start (시작)"	Oh Dong-jun	Oh Dong-jun	Go Ara
9.	"Fate (운명)"	Cho Byeong-seok	Cho Byeong-seok	Kim Sung-kyun, Min Do-hee (Note: Original song by Travel Skeches, released in 1997.)
10.	"Seoul, Here (서울 이곳은) (Acoustic ver.)"	Kim Soon-gun	Jang Cheol-woong	Roy Kim	2:35
11.	"You, I Cannot Have (가질 수 없는 너) (Acoustic ver.)"	Jeong Eun-kyung	Jeong Si-ro	Hi.ni	2:54
12.	"To You (너에게) (Inst.)"		Seo Taiji		3:50
13.	"Happy Me (행복한 나를) (Inst.)"		Park Geun-tae		4:12
14.	"Seoul, here (서울 이곳은) (Acoustic guitar ver.)"		Jang Cheol-woong		2:35

== Ratings ==
Ep.	Original broadcast date	Title	Average audience share (Nielsen Korea)	
Ep.	Original broadcast date	Title	Nationwide	Seoul
1	October 18, 2013	Seoul Person	2.858%	3.137%
2	October 19, 2013	We're All Strangers	2.264%	2.491%
3	October 25, 2013	A New Generation's Love	3.185%	3.528%
4	October 26, 2013	Lies	4.020%	4.449%
5	November 1, 2013	Words I Can't Bear to Say	4.778%	4.932%
6	November 2, 2013	Introduction to Gift-Giving	5.698%	5.789%
7	November 8, 2013	The Summer of That Year	5.991%	5.631%
8	November 9, 2013	A Moment's Decision Can Change Your Life Forever	7.242%	7.100%
9	November 15, 2013	So, the Thing I Want to Say Is...	8.090%	7.782%
10	November 16, 2013	It Might Be the Last	8.719%	9.244%
11	November 23, 2013	The Only Way to End an Unrequited Love	9.071%	9.008%
12	November 29, 2013	The Miracle That Will Happen to Us	9.046%	9.810%
13	November 30, 2013	The 10,000-Hour Rule	9.228%	9.573%
14	December 6, 2013	The People Who Changed Me, Part 1	9.241%	8.676%
15	December 7, 2013	The People Who Changed Me, Part 2	8.067%	8.031%
16	December 13, 2013	Love, Fear Part 1: Reply 1997	8.068%	7.769%
17	December 14, 2013	Love, Fear Part 2: Reply 1997	7.892%	8.509%
18	December 20, 2013	Should I Tell You Again That I Love You?	8.258%	8.046%
19	December 21, 2013	Do You Believe in Fate?	9.064%	9.800%
20	December 27, 2013	The Beginning of the End	9.670%	10.464%
21	December 28, 2013	To the Nineties	11.509%	11.962%
Average			7.128%	7.297%
In the table above, the blue numbers represent the lowest ratings and the red numbers represent the highest ratings.; This drama airs on a cable channel/pay TV which normally has a relatively smaller audience compared to free-to-air TV/public broadcasters (KBS, SBS, MBC and EBS).

== Awards and nominations ==
Year	Award	Category	Recipient	Result
2014	8th Cable TV Broadcasting Awards	Grand Prize (Daesang)	Reply 1994	Won
2014	50th Baeksang Arts Awards	Best TV Drama	Reply 1994	Nominated
2014	50th Baeksang Arts Awards	Best Director (TV)	Shin Won-ho	Nominated
2014	50th Baeksang Arts Awards	Best Screenplay (TV)	Lee Woo-jung	Nominated
2014	50th Baeksang Arts Awards	Best Actress (TV)	Go Ara	Nominated
2014	50th Baeksang Arts Awards	Best New Actor (TV)	Jung Woo	Won
2014	50th Baeksang Arts Awards	Best New Actor (TV)	Kim Sung-kyun	Nominated
2014	50th Baeksang Arts Awards	Best New Actress (TV)	Min Do-hee	Nominated
2014	50th Baeksang Arts Awards	Most Popular Actor (TV)	Jung Woo	Nominated
2014	50th Baeksang Arts Awards	Most Popular Actor (TV)	Yoo Yeon-seok	Nominated
2014	50th Baeksang Arts Awards	Most Popular Actor (TV)	Kim Sung-kyun	Nominated
2014	50th Baeksang Arts Awards	Most Popular Actress (TV)	Go Ara	Nominated
2014	50th Baeksang Arts Awards	Most Popular Actress (TV)	Min Do-hee	Nominated
2014	50th Baeksang Arts Awards	Best OST	Seoul, Here - Roy Kim	Nominated
2014	50th Baeksang Arts Awards	Best OST	To You - Sung Si-kyung	Nominated
2014	9th Seoul International Drama Awards	People's Choice Actor	Jung Woo	Nominated
2014	9th Seoul International Drama Awards	People's Choice Actress	Go Ara	Nominated
2014	7th Korea Drama Awards	Best Production Director	Shin Won-ho	Won
2014	7th Korea Drama Awards	Best Screenplay	Lee Woo-jung	Nominated
2014	7th Korea Drama Awards	Best New Actor	Son Ho-jun	Nominated
2014	7th Korea Drama Awards	Best New Actress	Min Do-hee	Won
2014	7th Korea Drama Awards	Best Couple	Kim Sung-kyun and Min Do-hee	Won
2014	6th MelOn Music Awards	Best OST	Only Feeling You - Jung Woo, Yoo Yeon-seok & Son Ho-jun	Nominated
2014	3rd APAN Star Awards	Excellence Award, Actor in a Miniseries	Jung Woo	Won
2014	3rd APAN Star Awards	Excellence Award, Actress in a Miniseries	Go Ara	Nominated
2014	3rd APAN Star Awards	Best Supporting Actor	Sung Dong-il	Nominated
2014	3rd APAN Star Awards	Best New Actor	Son Ho-jun	Won
2014	3rd APAN Star Awards	Best New Actress	Min Do-hee	Nominated
2014	16th Mnet Asian Music Awards	Best OST	Happy Me - Lim Kim	Nominated
2016	tvN10 Awards	Best Actor	Sung Dong-il	Nominated
2016	tvN10 Awards	Special Acting Award	Sung Dong-il	Won
2016	tvN10 Awards	Best Content Award, Drama	Reply 1994	Won
2016	tvN10 Awards	Made in tvN, Actor in Drama	Jung Woo	Nominated
2016	tvN10 Awards	Made in tvN, Actress in Drama	Go Ara	Nominated
2016	tvN10 Awards	Scene-Stealer Award, Actress	Lee Il-hwa	Nominated
2016	tvN10 Awards	Best Kiss Award	Jung Woo and Go Ara	Nominated

== See also ==
- Reply 1997
- Reply 1988
