= A Korean Odyssey =

2017 South Korean television series

- Promotional poster
- Hangul: 화유기
- RR: Hwayugi
- MR: Hwayugi
- Genre: Fantasy; Romance; Comedy; Horror
- Based on: Journey to the West by Wu Cheng'en
- Developed by: Studio Dragon
- Written by: Hong Jung-eun; Hong Mi-ran
- Directed by: Park Hong-kyun; Kim Jung-hyun; Kim Byung-soo
- Creative directors: Choi Hyun-sung; Geum Won-jung; Lee So-jin
- Starring: Lee Seung-gi; Cha Seung-won; Oh Yeon-seo; Lee Hong-gi; Jang Gwang
- Country of origin: South Korea
- Original language: Korean
- No. of episodes: 20

Production
- Executive producer: Lee Jin-suk
- Camera setup: Single-camera
- Running time: 70 minutes
- Production company: JS Pictures

Original release
- Network: tvN
- Release: December 23, 2017 – March 4, 2018

A Korean Odyssey (Korean: 화유기; RR: Hwayugi) is a South Korean fantasy television series starring Lee Seung-gi, Cha Seung-won, Oh Yeon-seo, Lee Hong-gi, and Jang Gwang. Written by the Hong sisters, the drama is a modern spin-off of the Chinese classic 16th-century novel Journey to the West. It aired on tvN starting December 23, 2017, every Saturday and Sunday at 21:00 (KST).

== Synopsis ==
In 2017, Son Oh-gong (Lee Seung-gi) and Woo Ma-wang (Cha Seung-won) are in conflict with each other as they look for a true light in a dark world where evil thrives. From there, Son Oh-gong is bound to his protective role towards Jin Seon-mi (Oh Yeon-seo), the little girl he had met years ago. Having made a contract with Seon-mi 25 years ago, entitling her to seek help from Son Oh-gong whenever she calls him in exchange for letting him free, the two meet again in a fateful encounter. From there, Son Oh Gong is bound to his protective role towards Seon Mi, the little girl he had met years ago.

== Plot ==
Seon-mi is a young girl born with the ability to see ghosts and spirits. Her seemingly irrational behavior has isolated her from her family and peers, and her only protection is her grandmother and a small yellow umbrella with protection spells written by a Buddhist monk. One day when she walks home from school, a ghost follows her, and this is witnessed by a mysterious man in a suit and black top hat (Woo Ma-wang). The mysterious man exorcises the ghost for her, and asks her for a favor: to enter a magical majestic house and retrieve a certain fan. She is also given specific instructions to ignore anyone she sees in there. However, the person inside the house is Son Oh-gong, the Monkey King, who was imprisoned inside by Heaven for his crimes. He blocks her path and forces her to acknowledge him, and tells her that the man outside is a great danger to her as well. Oh-gong makes her a deal: if she puts out the five candles on the table and frees him, he promises to protect her from all dangers in her life every time she calls his name. But after she agrees and releases him, Oh-gong steals the memory of his name out of her head and makes a run for it, leaving young Seon-mi stranded in the middle of nowhere.

In the present day, Seon-mi has grown up into an adult. Still armed with her little magic umbrella, she owns a real estate company that specializes in buying haunted houses, exorcising the spirits, and then flipping them for large profits. At a busy intersection, Seon-mi and Oh-gong spot each other and Seon-mi asks why he did what he did. He gives an unsatisfactory answer and Seon-mi tearfully asks aloud why she ever bothered having faith in him as a child. Meanwhile, Son Oh-gong is looking to reinstate his status as an immortal and has been doing various good deeds to earn brownie points with Heaven. He learns from a possessed doll that Sam-jang has been born, and anyone who eats Sam-jang's flesh can gain immortality. He decides to figure out who it is and eat them. However, Sam-jang is none other than Seon-mi, which means that Oh-gong cannot eat her without violating the promise he made to her as a child that he would protect her.

While Oh-gong tries to figure out a way to convince Seon-mi to die for him, Soo Bo-ri goes to Woo Ma-wang and asks him for help in protecting Sam-jang. Ma-wang takes Seon-mi to an antique shop with magical wares. There an old lady (Bodhisattva Guanyin) sells him a Geumganggo, a magical bracelet that will ensure the obedience of anyone who wears it through the power of love. The original Geumganggo is worn on the head, but this version is worn on the wrist. Seon-mi gives it to Oh-gong as a gift on Christmas Eve, and has a prophetic vision about standing in a field, wearing a hanbok, and giving him a kiss.

This dream comes true when Seon-mi is dragged into a haunted painting by a malevolent spirit that kidnaps women and tries to marry them all. Oh-gong enlists the help of Jeo Pal-gye (Lee Hong-gi), a pig demon and pop artist under Ma-wang's entertainment company, to get inside the painting. Pal-gye helps him, but he and Ma-wang burn the painting instead, trapping both Seon-mi and Oh-gong inside. Seon-mi decides to follow with her vision and kisses Oh-gong, thus activating the Geumganggo, though she did not realize what the Geumganggo would do. Oh-gong gives back her memory of his name and forces her out of the painting world, because he cannot leave the painting world unless she summons him from the outside. Seon-mi cuts her own hand and attracts a horde of demons to her before calling out Oh-gong's name. Oh-gong exits the painting world and rescues her from the demons.

From then on, the main plot is focused on Seon-mi and Oh-gong's budding relationship despite these difficult circumstances. Oh-gong professes to be deeply in love with Seon-mi, but only because of the Geumganggo. He constantly reminds her that if she takes it off, his love will disappear, and he may return to wanting to eat her for immortality instead. (In fact, if he really loves her from heart, he could take off the Geumganggo by himself. However, they don't know this.) Seon-mi, who has been a loner all her life, can't help but be touched by Oh-gong's thoughtful actions, and struggles to guard her heart against any romantic feelings because Sam-jang's tragic destiny is always to be a sacrifice for humanity against growing evil. Each episode involves Seon-mi and Oh-gong fighting off the demon of the week while dealing with their own internal conflicts. Seon-mi's feelings for Oh-gong are also constantly tested as she learns more about the kind of person Oh-gong is and his many secrets. The nightmare looming constantly over both their heads is a prophetic dream that Seon-mi had about the world ending, and knowing that she had to do everything she could to prevent it. Oh-gong later also learns that his role as Sam-jang's protector means he will either kill her, or she will kill him. This further drives them apart even as they fall more in love with each other.

== Cast ==
=== Main ===
- Lee Seung-gi as Son Oh-gong the Great Sage Equal to Heaven (based on Sun Wukong)

An extremely powerful immortal who was exiled to the human world with his powers sealed, due to his mischievous and prideful nature. Jin Seon-mi is the love of his life. He possesses many powers, such as pyrokinesis, levitation, telekinesis, and body imprisonment.

- Cha Seung-won as Woo Hwi / Woo Ma-wang (based on the Bull Demon King)

CEO of Lucifer Entertainment. A gentle and charismatic businessman, he is the object of others' envy due to his popularity. He has a bad history with Son Oh-gong in the past and now seeks chances to become a deity through 'collecting' points in order to change the fate of the woman he loves. He has supernatural powers that can affect Son Oh-gong.

- Oh Yeon-seo as Jin Seon-mi / Sam-jang (based on Tang Sanzang)
  - Kal So-won as young Jin Seon-mi

A real estate CEO who resells houses that have had notoriously bad luck (inhabited by evil spirits). She is wealthy, beautiful, and has an unyielding tenacity. When she was a kid, she was ostracized by her peers. She meets Ma-wang, and releases Son Oh-gong from his prison, and later meets him again by fate. She is put off by Oh-gong initially but eventually comes to enjoy his companionship, and he finally becomes the love of her life. She has the ability to see ghosts and her blood has mystical properties that can enhance the powers of any entity. For this reason, demons and ghosts are easily attracted to her.

- Lee Hong-gi as P.K / Jeo Pal-gye (based on Zhu Bajie)

A top star under Woo Hwi's agency Lucifer Entertainment. He has the power to seduce women and sucks the life force out of them. He is a pig demon.

- Jang Gwang as Yoon Dae-sik / Sa Oh-jeong (based on Sha Wujing)

CEO of MSUN, a mobile phone manufacturing company. He is a river demon and a close friend of Son Oh-gong.

=== Supporting ===
- Lee Se-young as Jung Se-ra / Zombie / Jin Bu-ja / Richie (Bu-ja) / Asanyeo (based on Baigujing)

An idol group trainee under Woo Hwi's agency. She is a corpse accidentally reanimated by San-jang's blood. Because she cannot remember her past, she tries to find out who she is while her body continues to deteriorate.

- Song Jong-ho as Kang Dae-sung

A politician who is a candidate for the presidential election, and is popular with female voters for his good looks and his gentle character.

- Kim Ji-soo as Cha Eun / Seo Yoon-hee / Na Chal-nyeo (based on Princess Iron Fan)

Woo Hwi's first love, who is serving her punishment for stealing human children souls for her child.

- Sung Ji-ru as Soo Bo-ri (based on Subhūti)

An elderly deity who knows hints of the heavens' plans and helps Woo Ma-wang in tabulating the points needed to be accumulated for him to achieve his goal of being a deity.

- Lee El as Ma Ji-young

Woo Hwi's secretary and number one follower. She is a dog demon.

- Kim Sung-oh as Lee Han-joo

A real estate employee who works under Jin Seon-mi.

- Sung Hyuk as General Winter and Summer Fairy

Two spirits in a body whereby General Winter is Son Oh-gong's advisor who owns an ice cream shop in the day, whilst Summer Fairy is a warm and social lady who owns a cocktail shop in the night, offering a listening ear to the demons as well as Sam-jang.

- Yoon Bo-ra as Alice / Ok-ryong (based on White Dragon Horse)

A top star in Woo Hwi's agency. She later becomes the host vessel for Jade Dragon, the second son of one of the four Dragon Kings who rule the oceans.

- Im Ye-jin as Peddler (based on Guanyin)

She owns a general store at Pirun-dong 28 where Woo Ma-wang bought the Geumganggo.

- Jung Jae-won as Hong Hae-ah (based on Hong Hai Er)

A mysterious youth who is also the grandson of a peddler. Woo Ma-wang's son.

=== Special appearances ===
- Oh Yoo-mi as the teacher ghost that Ma-wang got rid of (Ep. 1)
- Jung Sang-hyun as Seon-mi's bully (Ep. 1)
- Seo Jang-hyun as Seon-mi's bully (Ep. 1)
- Lee Yong-yi as Jin Seon-mi's grandmother (Ep. 1, 3)
- Kim Ji-sung as the ghost who died losing 30 kg for an audition (Ep. 1)
- Kim Yeon-woo as TV show "Superstar" judge Kim Yeon-woo (Ep. 1)
- Choi Dae-sung as broadcasting station PD (Ep. 1–2, 6)
- Yoo Yeon-jung as Lee Da-in (Ep. 1)
- Park Sang-hoon as Eun-seong, the boy possessed by wooden doll ghost (Ep. 1)
- Baek Seung-hee as the woman possessed by wooden doll ghost's bride (Ep. 1)
- Kang Jae-joon and Lee Eun-hyung as the newlyweds (Ep. 2)
- Min Sung-wook as Saekjungki (Ep. 2)
- Son Young-sun as the street vendor who sold Seon-mi popcorn (Ep. 3)
- Seo Yoon-ah as Mi-joo, Seon-mi's pregnant cousin (Ep. 3)
- Jung Jae-eun as Maternal Aunt (Ep. 3)
- Jang Keun-suk as Gong Jak, a peacock demon (Ep. 3)
- Kang Sung-pil as Gangster (Ep. 3–4)
- Ham Na-young as Akiko, the Japanese spirit (Ep. 5, 16)
- Park Seung-tae as Kang Myung-ja (Ep. 5, 16)
- Jo Sung-ha as the man reading a newspaper who told Ma-wang the time in the movie (Ep. 5)
- Park Seul-gi as Reporter (Ep. 5)
- Kim Mi-hye as heartbroken woman (Ep. 6)
- Bang Su-jin as Mermaid (Ep. 7)
- Michael K. Lee as Jonathan / Bong Sang-woo (Ep. 6–8, 10, 12, 15–16)
  - Kim Hyun-bin as young Jonathan

Jin Seon-mi is his first love.

- Joey Albright as Tony, Jonathan's business partner (Ep. 7)
- Park Noh-shik as Dokchi (Ep. 8)
- Ok Ye-rin as Han-byul, Han-joo's daughter (Ep. 9, 15, 20)
- Kim Min-ho as Han-sol, Han-joo's son (Ep. 9, 15, 20)
- Oh Ah-rin as Lee Soo-jung (Ep. 9–10)
- Choi Seung-hoon as Lee Soo-chul, Soo-jung's brother (Ep. 9–10, 20)
- Lee So-yeon as Bookseller (Ep. 9–10)
- Kim Si-ha as Woo Hwi's alleged inheritance child (Ep. 11)
- Seo Eun-woo as Summer Fairy's true form (Ep. 15)
- Oh Yeon-ah as Egret (Ep. 16)
- Kum Chae-ahn as the girl introduced to Oh-gong (Ep. 18)

== Production ==
Park Bo-gum was offered the lead role of Son Oh-gong in July 2017, but eventually declined. Choo Ja-hyun was originally cast in the cameo role of Na Chal-nyeo, but had to be replaced by Kim Ji-soo due to pregnancy.

The series reunites Cha Seung-won, Lee Seung-gi, and Lee Hong-gi with the Hong sisters, who have worked together in the TV series The Greatest Love (2011), My Girlfriend Is a Nine-Tailed Fox (2010) and You're Beautiful (2009) respectively. It also reunites Hong sisters and director Park Hong-kyun who worked together on Warm and Cozy (2015) and The Greatest Love (2011), as well as Lee Seung Gi, Cha Seung Won and Sung Ji Ru who starred together in You're All Surrounded (2014).

On December 27, it was announced that director Kim Jung-hyun will join the production. A third director, Kim Byung-soo was added to the production on January 5, 2018.

== Reception ==
According to data released by Nielsen Korea, A Korean Odyssey ranked the most-watched show of its time slot including both cable and public broadcasting channels for its premiere episode. Moreover, the series broke the record for the highest ratings for the first episode of a tvN drama in the Nielsen Korea 20-49 year-old target audience bracket.

== Controversy ==
On December 24, episode 2 broadcast was repeatedly interrupted by long commercial ads during which tvN displayed a message stating that "internal issues delayed the broadcast". The broadcast then resumed but was later abruptly cut altogether. tvN issued an apology stating that there was "a delay in the computer graphics process" and that "the finalized version of episode 2 is set to air on December 25 at 6:10 p.m. (KST)."

The show suffered another controversy when it was revealed that a staff member was seriously injured after falling on set.

== Original soundtrack ==
A Korean Odyssey Original soundtrack

Soundtrack album
- Studio: CJ E&M Music Studios
- Genre: Soundtrack
- Languages: Korean, English
- Label: CJ E&M

=== Part 1 ===
No.	Title	Artists	Length
1.	"Let Me Out"	NU'EST W	3:18
2.	"Let Me Out" (Inst.)		3:18
Total length:			6:36

=== Part 2 ===
No.	Title	Artists	Length
1.	"When I Saw You"	Bumkey	2:57
2.	"When I Saw You" (Inst.)		2:57
Total length:			5:54

=== Part 3 ===
No.	Title	Artists	Length
1.	"I'll Be By Your Side" (네 옆에 있을게)	MeloMance	4:04
2.	"I'll Be By Your Side" (Inst.)		4:04
Total length:			8:08

=== Part 4 ===
No.	Title	Artists	Length
1.	"I'll Be Fine" (뒷모습)	Suran	4:16
2.	"I'll Be Fine" (Inst.)		4:16
Total length:			8:32

=== Part 5 ===
No.	Title	Artists	Length
1.	"If You Were Me (ft. Yoo Hwe-seung of N.Flying)" (니가 나라면)	AOA (Jimin, Yuna)	3:13
2.	"If You Were Me (ft. Yoo Hwe-seung of N.Flying)" (Inst.)		3:13
Total length:			6:26

=== Part 6 ===
No.	Title	Artists	Length
1.	"If We Were Destined" (운명이라면)	Ben	4:08
2.	"If We Were Destined" (Inst.)		4:08
Total length:			8:16

=== Part 7 ===
No.	Title	Artists	Length
1.	"Like A Miracle (Someday)" (그 언젠가 기적처럼)	Hwang Chi-yeul	3:56
2.	"Like A Miracle (Someday)" (Inst.)		3:56
Total length:			7:52

=== Part 8 ===
No.	Title	Artists	Length
1.	"Always You"	leeSA	2:53
2.	"Always You" (Inst.)		2:53
Total length:			5:46

=== Part 9 ===
No.	Title	Artists	Length
1.	"Believe"	Mackelli	3:38
2.	"Believe" (Inst.)		3:38
3.	"Justify" (Opening Title)	Various Artists	1:50
4.	"Fara Effect"	Various Artists	2:29
5.	"Fire"	Various Artists	2:28
6.	"Mawang Tension"	Various Artists	1:26
7.	"Ghost scene"	Various Artists	1:50
Total length:			14:55

== Ratings ==
A Korean Odyssey : South Korea viewers per episode (millions)

Season	Episode number																				Average
Season	1	2	3	4	5	6	7	8	9	10	11	12	13	14	15	16	17	18	19	20	Average
1	N/A	N/A	1.649	1.836	1.845	2.084	1.494	1.914	1.680	1.955	1.782	1.767	1.297	1.865	1.093	1.284	1.237	1.627	1.810	2.115	N/A

Source: Audience measurement performed nationwide by Nielsen Media Research.

Average TV viewership ratings
Ep.	Original broadcast date	Average audience share		
Ep.	Original broadcast date	AGB Nielsen		TNmS
Ep.	Original broadcast date	Nationwide	Seoul	Nationwide
1	December 23, 2017	5.290% (1st)	5.933% (1st)	4.9%
2 (Note: On December 24, 2017, episode 2 did not fully air due to "internal issues" and was re-broadcast the following day at 18:10 (KST).)	December 24, 2017	4.849% (1st)	5.292% (1st)	5.4%
2	December 25, 2017	5.623% (1st)	6.659% (1st)	6.2%
3	January 6, 2018 (Note: Episode 3 and 4, which were supposed to air on December 30 and 31, 2017 respectively, were pushed back a week to give time for the production team to work on the CG, as well as to evaluate the production process of the program.)	5.614% (1st)	6.125% (1st)	7.1%
4	January 7, 2018	6.060% (1st)	6.439% (1st)	7.0%
5	January 13, 2018	6.102% (1st)	6.473% (1st)	6.2%
6	January 14, 2018	6.942% (1st)	7.749% (1st)	7.2%
7	January 20, 2018	5.131% (1st)	5.044% (1st)	6.1%
8	January 21, 2018	5.822% (1st)	5.949% (1st)	6.4%
9	January 27, 2018	5.054% (1st)	5.539% (1st)	5.8%
10	January 28, 2018	6.271% (1st)	6.987% (1st)	6.6%
11	February 3, 2018	5.705% (1st)	5.702% (1st)	6.5%
12	February 4, 2018	5.605% (1st)	6.122% (1st)	6.1%
13	February 10, 2018	4.397% (1st)	4.365% (2nd)	5.0%
14	February 11, 2018	5.517% (1st)	5.810% (1st)	6.2%
15	February 17, 2018	3.586% (2nd)	3.516% (2nd)	4.5%
16	February 18, 2018	4.250% (1st)	4.565% (1st)	4.6%
17	February 24, 2018	3.821% (2nd)	3.819% (3rd)	5.0%
18	February 25, 2018	5.472% (1st)	5.708% (1st)	6.2%
19	March 3, 2018	5.945% (1st)	6.205% (1st)	6.8%
20	March 4, 2018	6.881% (1st)	6.924% (1st)	7.4%
Average		5.415%	5.713%	6.1%
In the table above, the blue numbers represent the lowest ratings and the red numbers represent the highest ratings.; This drama aired on a cable channel/pay TV which normally has a relatively smaller audience compared to free-to-air TV/public broadcasters (KBS, SBS, MBC and EBS).
