= Bonjour Bakery =

2026 South Korean reality show

- Promotional poster
- Hangul: 봉주르빵집
- RR: Bongjureu ppangjip
- MR: Pongjurŭ ppangchip
- Genre: Reality television
- Written by: Kim Ran-ju
- Directed by: Park Geun-hyung
- Starring: Kim Hee-ae; Cha Seung-won; Kim Seon-ho; Lee Ki-taek
- Country of origin: South Korea
- Original language: Korean
- No. of episodes: 8

Production
- Production company: Studio Yeoreumnal

Original release
- Network: Coupang Play
- Release: May 8, 2026

Bonjour Bakery (Korean: 봉주르빵집) is a South Korean reality television show starring Kim Hee-ae, Cha Seung-won, Kim Seon-ho, and Lee Ki-taek. It premiered on Coupang Play on May 8, 2026, at 16:00 (KST), with each new episode being released every Friday. The series is also concurrently streamed globally on Rakuten Viki and exclusively on Hami Video in Taiwan.

== Premise ==
Bonjour Bakery is a baking variety show featuring the "Bakery Family 4," a team of four actors who operate South Korea's first senior-oriented pâtisserie café, with the "Yes Senior Zone" concept, where entry is exclusively reserved for individuals aged 65 or older and their companions. Located in a tranquil rural village, the shop specializes in French desserts reimagined with Korean influences.

== Cast ==
=== Main ===
- Kim Hee-ae as Cafe General Manager, Hall Team.
- Cha Seung-won as Head Patisserie, Chef Team.
- Kim Seon-ho as Barista, Hall Team.
- Lee Ki-taek as Assistant Patisserie, Chef Team.

=== Guest ===
- Dino
- Ong Seong-wu
- Lee Joo-bin

== Production ==
=== Development ===
Coupang Play announced the variety show Bonjour Bakery on February 13, 2026, as part of its annual content lineup. The program is produced by Studio Yeoreumnal, with a creative team that includes screenwriter Kim Ran-ju and director Park Geun-hyung, a former director of You Quiz on the Block. Later Kim shared that preparations began in the fall of 2025.

The show features a four-actor cast operating South Korea's first rural village senior pâtisserie café, which follows a "Yes Senior Zone" concept. Entry is restricted to individuals aged 65 and older, though companions of any age are permitted. Writer Kim and Director Park stated, "We wanted to create an opportunity to broaden intergenerational understanding." They also emphasized that despite casting actors, they wanted the seniors to remain the primary protagonists.

During the show's press conference, Kim Ran-ju cited her late father as her inspiration. She recalled how during his illness, he frequently traveled from Yeosu to a hospital in Seoul, and she would see him off at Yongsan Station. One day, while waiting at a station café, her father noticed a cake in the display case and asked about it. Kim ordered the cake for him, and seeing how much he enjoyed it, she realized for the first time that he liked cake. Realizing that their time together was mostly spent in the hospital cafeteria, she spent the final two years before his death in 2024 by regularly taking him out to different restaurants. Kim explained that these memories provided the emotional support that ultimately inspired her to create Bonjour Bakery. She added that because elderly parents often feel like a burden when their children take them out, she established a strict age limit to invert that dynamic, creating a space dedicated to seniors where they could instead bring their children along as companions.

The café serves coffee, bread, and French desserts that combine classic pastry techniques with local specialties from Gochang County. Its signature item is the Green Barley Field Tart, which incorporates Gochang green barley into both the crust and toppings. Other menu items include the Bonjour Kumquat Forsythia Tart, Camellia Tart, Strawberry and Blueberry Éclair, and Raspberry Croissant. The recipes were developed by pastry chef Kwon Joo-won and Lee So-young of Sous Le Gui. When designing the café's interior, the top priority was ensuring it did not look like a set. Instead of relying on the art team, the production entrusted construction to a company with extensive experience in building actual rural cafes, and selected vintage tiles that looked as if countless footprints had passed over them to lay on the floor. The team also paid attention to every single prop, such as producing large-capacity cups so that customers could linger comfortably.

=== Casting ===
Kim Hee-ae and Cha Seung-won were mentioned as cast members during the Coupang Play annual content lineup announcement on February 13, 2026. On March 4, 2026, reports emerged that Kim Seon-ho and Lee Ki-taek would also join the production. Coupang Play finalized this lineup on April 2, confirming all four actors for the show.

The cast is divided into two teams. For the Hall Team, Kim Hee-ae serves as cafe manager and Kim Seon-ho as barista. Both received professional barista and beverage preparation training before filming. The Kitchen Team consists of pâtissier Cha Seung-won and assistant Lee Ki-taek, neither of whom had prior professional French baking experience. Despite his prior cooking experience in series such as Three Meals a Day and Korean Hostel in Spain, this production marked Cha's first experience with professional French baking. The pair trained for their roles by taking baking classes three times per week for three weeks. Since fall, despite filming another drama and undergoing knee therapy simultaneously, Cha cleared his schedule to practice baking. Although the production team suggested reducing the menu, Cha insisted on learning everything to give seniors a wide variety of new flavors to experience.

=== Filming ===
Principal photography took place over approximately two weeks in starting in March to April 2026, with the cast sharing group accommodations during production. Filming was centered in the show's café, located in Gapyeong-ri, Sinlim-myeon, a village at the foot of Bangjangsan in Gochang County, Jeonbuk. Screenwriter Kim Ran-ju said that Gochang's distinctive geographic landscape, having both mountains and tidal flats, provided an abundance of local specialties that matched the show's culinary concept.

Kim selected the village based on her previous experience filming the 200th-episode special of 2 Days & 1 Night there. The village also served as a location for her shows Three Meals a Day, and Fresh off the Sea. During past location scouting trips, Kim observed that local elderly residents regularly gathered at the village hall to share meals. She also noted a long-abandoned local supermarket that had closed around the time 2 Days & 1 Night was filmed. The production team intended that renovating the former supermarket into the show's dessert café would be meaningful for the neighborhood's elderly residents.

To blend naturally into rural life, the production team sent writers to live in the village two months before filming. Writer Kim explained, "Once we became close to the elders like granddaughters, they began sharing their life and family stories first." This pre-established intimacy enabled the show to capture both interactions inside the shop and personal stories that unfolded when bread was taken home. Producer Park added that they hid the cameras and had the production crew act like people working at the bakery.

== Release ==
A press conference hosted by Park Kyung-lim was held on March 6, 2026, at Community House Masil in Myeong-dong, Seoul. The event was attended by cast members Kim Hee-ae, Cha Seung-won, Kim Seon-ho, and Lee Ki-taek, alongside producing director Park Geun-hyung and writer Kim Ran-ju.

On April 2, 2026, Coupang Play confirmed the series would premiere on Friday, May 8 at 16:00 (KST), with new episodes released every Friday. First teaser was released on April 4. Promotional materials included character posters released on April 9, followed by the official posters on April 16 and 18. The series was also made available for global streaming on Rakuten Viki and exclusively on Chunghwa Telecom's Hami Video in Taiwan.

In July, Kim Ran-ju shared that Bonjour Bakery is scheduled to broadcast on KBS in August. Kim expressed optimism that expanded regional and content exposure through the broadcast would encourage local government engagement, thereby facilitating discussions on infrastructure development and mutual growth strategies. Further report mentions that it will air on KBS2 starting Wednesday, August 5 at 9:50 PM (KST), marking the first time KBS has broadcast content originally released on an OTT platform. KBS selected the show for its public-spirited focus on marginalized regions and seniors, aiming to diversify programming strategies and expand audience reach.

== Episodes ==
Ep. #	Broadcast Date	Guest	Notes
1	May 8, 2026	Dino	Premiere
2	May 15, 2026	Dino	
3	May 22, 2026	—	
4	May 29, 2026	—	
5	June 5, 2026	—	
6	June 12, 2026	Ong Seong-wu and Lee Joo-bin	
7	June 19, 2026	Lee Joo-bin	
8	June 26, 2026	Dino	

== Reception ==
=== Viewership and industry metrics ===
Following its premiere, Bonjour Bakery ranked first on Rakuten Viki's weekly rankings in Southeast Asia during its first week of release. It also made it into the top 10 in 127 countries across the globe, spanning the Americas, Europe, the Middle East, and Oceania. It firmly held the top spot for five consecutive weeks in major Southeast Asian countries, recording the best performance among Korean variety series. In early July, Hami Video announced that Bonjour Bakery was among their top-performing titles in its Movie Theater+ category for the first half of 2026.

The show generated substantial buzz following its May 8 premiere, sustained by strong performances from its main cast. In Week 19th of 2026, Kim Seon-ho placed 10th in the Good Data Corporation's non-drama performer buzz ranking with a score of 0.89%. Per Racoi OTT Response Cast rankings, the ensemble cast debuted in the final week of April before sweeping the top four positions in early May, after which the cast members maintained a steady presence across the top ten rankings throughout May and June. Kim Seon-ho secured first place one time during the debut week in early May, and Lee Ki-taek secured first place one time during the second week of May, making a total of two times that first place was achieved between them. While Kim Hee-ae peaked at second place during early May, and Cha Seung-won peaked at third place twice during early and mid-May. (Note: During May and June 2025, the cast members' weekly rankings fluctuated as follows: Last Week of April: 5. Cha Seung-won, 7. Kim Seon-ho, 8. Kim Hee-ae, 11. Lee Ki-taek.; Early May (Debut Week): 1. Kim Seon-ho, 2. Kim Hee-ae, 3. Cha Seung-won, 4. Lee Ki-taek.; Second Week of May: 1. Lee Ki-taek, 2. Kim Seon-ho, 3. Cha Seung-won, 4. Kim Hee-ae.; Third Week of May: 5. Kim Hee-ae, 6. Cha Seung-won, 7. Lee Ki-taek, 8. Kim Seon-ho.; Fourth Week of May: 5. Lee Ki-taek, 6. (Tie) Cha Seung-won and Kim Seon-ho, 7. Kim Hee-ae.; First Week of June: 6. (Tie) Lee Ki-taek and Kim Seon-ho, 7. (Tie) Kim Hee-ae and Cha Seung-won.; Second Week of June: 8. Cha Seung-won, 9. Lee Ki-taek, 10. (Tie) Kim Hee-ae and Kim Seon-ho.; Third Week of June: 5. Kim Seon-ho, 6. Cha Seung-won, 7. Kim Hee-ae, 9. Lee Ki-taek.)

=== Critical reception ===
Bonjour Bakery received positive reviews from critics. Kim Ga-young of Edaily highlighted the series as a turning point for Coupang Play, writing that it allowed the platform to transcend its reputation for sensational variety programming. Kim praised the show because it "combines fun with warmth and emotion," which she noted successfully demonstrated an expansion of the service's overall programming scope. Kim argued that the show effectively bridges entertainment and heartfelt connection, and that creating a space centered on seniors offers a meaningful opportunity for generational harmony, empathy, and respect in a society where older generations are frequently marginalized.

In his Seo Byeong-gi Culture Insight column, Seo described Bonjour Bakery as a sanctuary for elders in a traditional village, noting that gathering together encourages them to share personal stories rather than stick to fixed family roles. With the production team expanding camera angles to capture these nuances, Seo expressed hope that viewers will appreciate the authentic community culture of the elderly residents as a truly valuable asset.

Writing for Naeoe Economic TV, Jeong Dong-jin noted that the show is both familiar and groundbreaking, pointing out an unusual age restriction for entry. He also stated that its ability to deliver quiet emotion and entertainment stems from viewing subjects with a warm perspective, successfully blurring the lines between entertainment and documentary.

Son Hyo-jeong of Bravo Culture Issue echoed the sentiment regarding the blend of entertainment and documentary. Son highlighted that while most cafes and cultural spaces cater to younger generations amid ongoing controversies surrounding "no-senior zones," (Note: A no-senior zone (노시니어존) refers to a commercial space, such as a café or restaurant, that explicitly restricts or bans entry to elderly individuals, typically defined as those aged 65 and older. This practice reflects a growing generational divide and mirrors the controversial trend of "no-kids zones" in South Korea.) The show reverses this trend by placing seniors at the forefront through its "yes-senior zone" concept. The show requires at least one member of a party to be 65 or older to gain entry, leading to the unique dynamic of cast members personally checking IDs. Son noted that the program's charm stems from the seniors' unpretentious nature, concluding that a super-aged society (Note: A super aged society is a demographic classification used by the United Nations to describe a country where 20 percent or more of its total population is aged 65 or older.) requires viewing seniors as ordinary neighbors rather than subjects of special care.

== Commercial and social impact ==
To commemorate his birthday in May 2026, cast member Kim Seon-ho donated ₩50 million to the Korea Association of Senior Welfare Center. (Note: The Korea Association of Senior Welfare Centers (KASWC; 한국노인종합복지관협회) is a national network of senior welfare facilities in South Korea. It supports policy initiatives, education, research, and collaborative networks to advance the development of senior centers and improve elderly welfare.) According to his agency, the contribution was directly inspired by his experiences interacting with elderly residents during the filming of Bonjour Bakery. The funds were designated to support nationwide educational programs and social participation activities for seniors.

This show leverages its intellectual property by developing recipes featured in the program into actual products. On March 11, 2026, Coupang Play announced a special promotion in which bakery items and kitchenware featured in the program would be available for purchase on Coupang, online shopping app under the same group, using the company's Rocket Delivery infrastructure. The promotion also included collaborations with premium food brands, including Laboca, Artisee, and Breadmill. Seven dessert recipes from the program were developed into commercial products, including the Green Barley Field Tart, Bokbunja Croissant, Peanut Pain au Chocolat, and Sweet Potato Galette. It also promoted professional-grade baking tools, such as Steni mixing bowls and Wagensteiger utensils.

The program also partnered with CU, a convenience store chain operated by BGF Retail. Pre-orders for the Green Barley Field Tart began on May 13 via CU's app, Pocket CU, and the product attracted interest, with 100 units selling out in one minute each day for six consecutive days. Starting May 25, CU planned to sell an additional 120 units daily for five days. From May 25 onward, CU sequentially released the Green Barley Brioche, Raspberry Croissant, Pain au Chocolat, and Sweet Pumpkin Babka.

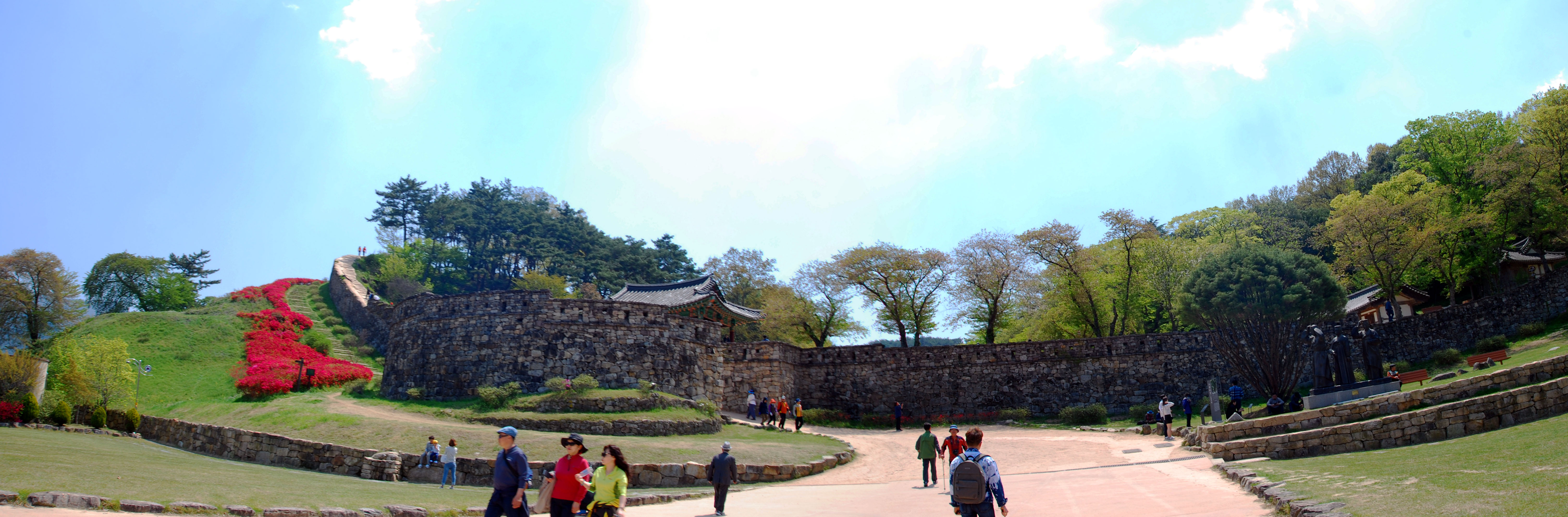
Gochangeupseong Fortress

The locations featured in the show, Gochang Eupseong Fortress and Cheongnongwon, were selected by Jeonbuk Special Self-Governing Province as part of a curated travel route linked with K-content. The program aims to attract summer tourists by combining accommodation discounts with diverse tourism content, in conjunction with the Ministry of Culture, Sports and Tourism's 2026 Summer Accommodation Sale Festa, running from June 11 to July 31, 2026.

== Awards and nominations ==
Awards and nominations
Award ceremony	Year	Category	Recipient(s)	Result	Ref.
Blue Dragon Series Awards	2026	Best New Entertainer	Kim Seon-ho	Nominated	

== See also ==
- List of French desserts
