= Hong sisters =

South Korean television screenwriters

- Occupation: Screenwriter
- Years active: 2005–present
- Employer: Studio Sot (Imaginus)
- Organization: Korea Television and Radio Writers Association
- Hong Jung-eun
- Born: 1974 (age 51–52); South Korea
- Education: Ewha Womans University (Bachelor of Public Administration)
- Years active: 1998–present
- Spouse: Unknown (m. 2000)
- Children: 1
- Hong Mi-ran
- Born: 1977 (age 48–49); South Korea
- Occupation: Teacher

Hong sisters
- Hangul: 홍자매
- RR: Hong jamae
- MR: Hong chamae

Hong Jung-eun
- Hangul: 홍정은
- RR: Hong Jeongeun
- MR: Hong Chŏngŭn

Hong Mi-ran
- Hangul: 홍미란
- RR: Hong Miran
- MR: Hong Miran

The Hong sisters (Korean: 홍자매) are two South Korean screenwriters: Hong Jung-eun (born 1974) and Hong Mi-ran (born 1977), known for writing popular romantic-comedy television series, notably My Girl (2005), You're Beautiful (2009), My Girlfriend Is a Gumiho (2010), The Greatest Love (2011), Master's Sun (2013), A Korean Odyssey (2017–2018), Hotel del Luna (2019), Alchemy of Souls (2022), its second part Alchemy of Souls: Light and Shadow (2022–2023), and Can This Love Be Translated? (2026).

== Career ==
=== Early career in variety television ===
Before transitioning to television drama, Hong Jung-eun and Hong Mi-ran worked as writers for variety programs. Hong Jung-eun began her career as an assistant writer at MBC TV in 1998, where she remained for eight years. Her credits at MBC include Sunday Sunday Night, People Looking for Laughter, and the re-enactment program Mysterious TV Surprise. Hong Mi-ran spent five years working as a variety writer, contributing to SBS TV's Columbus' Great Discovery and KBS2 TV's sitcom Run, My Mom.

=== Television screenwriting debut and early works ===
The Hong sisters made their television drama writing debut in 2005 with Sassy Girl Chun-hyang, a modern reinterpretation of the Korean folktale Chunhyangjeon. The series reimagined the protagonist as a assertive, headstrong character. The drama achieved commercial success throughout Asia. Their subsequent project, My Girl (2005), centered on a con artist who assumes the identity of a wealthy man's long-lost granddaughter, also proved successful. These early works contributed to the rise of their lead actors, including Han Chae-young, Jae Hee, Lee Da-hae, Lee Joon-gi, and Lee Dong-wook into household names and as prominent figures in the Korean Wave.

The Hongs' continued this success with Couple or Trouble (2006), a remake of the 1987 Hollywood film Overboard. The series starred Han Ye-seul an heiress suffering from amnesia who develops a relationship with a handyman played by Oh Ji-ho.

For Hong Gil-dong (2008), the writers based their protagonist on the fictional folk hero of the same name, a Joseon-era figure often compared to Robin Hood for stealing from the rich to provide for the poor. This Kang Ji-hwan and Sung Yu-ri, incorporated royal intrigue and romance alongside unconventional elements such as elaborate stunts, stylized costumes, slapstick humor, and anachronistic modern music. Although the series received average television ratings, it maintained strong popularity online and won Best Miniseries at the 2008 Roma Fiction Fest.

=== Television dramas with Pan Asian recognition ===
For its next production, the Hong sisters transitioned to a youth drama You're Beautiful (2009). Casting Jang Keun-suk and Park Shin-hye in a story about a naive nun who disguises herself as a male idol to join a boy band. While it did not achieve high domestic viewership ratings, it developed a significant cult following online and among international audiences. The series was broadcast across various Asian markets, including Japan, China, Thailand, Malaysia, Singapore, Indonesia, the UAE, and the Philippines.In Japan, it achieved high ratings on Fuji Television, reportedly surpassing its competitors in the same timeslot. The series is believed to have overtaken the popularity of Winter Sonata, another popular Korean drama in Japan.

The series' soundtrack was a commercial success, selling 20,000 copies within its first week and topping various music charts, including Melon, Dosirak, and Mnet. By the end of 2011, the album had sold 57,000 copies in South Korea. The soundtrack was written and produced by Han Sung-ho, who also worked on drama Brilliant Legacy. The drama featured concert footage of the fictional group A.N.JELL, and it was reported that 25,000 fans attended a real-life mini-concert performed by the cast. Due to its pan-Asian success, the series was remade in Japan in 2011 as Ikemen desu ne and in Taiwan 2013 as Fabulous Boys.

In 2010, the Hong sisters subverted Korean mythology for their next drama, My Girlfriend Is a Gumiho. Departing from the traditional portrayal of the gumiho as a predatory femme fatale who consumes human livers, the series introduces a whimsical character (played by Shin Min-a) who is portrayed as a naive, endearing girl with a fondness for Korean beef. The plot follows an aspiring stuntman (played by Lee Seung-gi) who aids her in her quest to become human. The 16-episode series, directed by Boo Sung-chul, aired from August 11 to September 30, 2010, in SBS TV, recording a peak viewership rating of 19.9%.

The Hong sisters returned to the MBC TV in 2011 with The Greatest Love, which aired from May 4 to June 23. Directed by Park Hong-kyun and Lee Dong-yoon, the 16-episode series was set within the image-conscious world of entertainment and starred Cha Seung-won as the nation's most beloved actor Dokko Jin, who falls in love with a has-been pop singer Gu Ae-jung, portrayed by Gong Hyo-jin. The series consistently topped its time slot, reaching a peak viewership rating of 21.0%. It received significant critical acclaim, sweeping the 2011 MBC Drama Awards, including the Writer of the Year award for the Hong sisters, while Gong Hyo-jin secured the Best Actress title at the 2012 Baeksang Arts Awards.

In 2012, the Hong sisters returned to KBS2 with Big, a series starring Gong Yoo and Lee Min-jung that centers on the body-swap premise of an 18-year-old and a 30-year-old. Directed by Ji Byung-hyun and Kim Sung-yoon, the 16-episode drama aired from June 4 to July 24, 2012. Critical reception for Big was mixed. With a peak viewership rating of 11.1%, it is frequently cited as one of the writers' less successful projects compared to their other works.

The Hong sisters reunited with Gong Hyo-jin for their 2013 project, Master's Sun. This horror romantic comedy, which also starred So Ji-sub, follows the story of a woman capable of seeing ghosts. Directed by Jin Hyuk for SBS TV, the 17-episode series aired from August 7 to October 3, 2013, achieving a peak viewership rating of 21.8%.

In 2015, the Hong sisters drew inspiration from the fable of The Ant and the Grasshopper for their 16-episode series Warm and Cozy. Set on Jeju Island, the drama follows Baek Gun-woo (Yoo Yeon-seok) a chef and restaurant owner named Maendorong Ttottot (맨도롱 또똣; 'Warm and Cozy') and Lee Jung-joo (Kang So-ra), an administrative employee who moves to Jeju to start anew after losing her job, house, and boyfriend in Seoul. The series, which notably incorporates the Jeju dialect, aired on MBC TV from May 13 to July 2, 2015, on Wednesdays and Thursdays at 22:00, reaching a peak viewership rating of 8.8%.

=== Legal dispute over tvN drama A Korean Odyssey ===
In 2017, the Hong sisters ventured into cable television with their modern adaptation of the Chinese classic novel Journey to the West, titled A Korean Odyssey. The series featured Cha Seung-won, Lee Seung-gi, and Lee Hong-gi, all of whom had previously collaborated with the screenwriters. The project reunited the sisters with director Park Hong-kyun with whom they had worked on Warm and Cozy (2015) and The Greatest Love (2011). Directors Kim Jung-hyun and Kim Byung-soo later joined the production team.

A Korean Odyssey premiered on tvN on December 23, 2017, airing on Saturdays and Sundays. It immediately outperformed both cable and public broadcast channels in its time slot during its debut. While the series achieved a peak viewership rating of 6.9%, this figure was considered high for a cable production at the time, and the show notably set a new viewership record for tvN dramas within the 20 to 49 age demographic.

In May 2018, internet novelist Ttangyeol accused the Hong sisters of plagiarizing her work, Aeyugi. The Hong sisters denied the allegations, noting that the drama had been in development prior to the 2015 publication of Aeyugi and that both works were independently derived from Journey to the West. On February 15, 2019, the Seoul Western District Court's 11th Civil Affairs Department ruled in favor of the Hong sisters, dismissing the charges.

=== Projects with Studio Dragon ===
Following the resolution of their legal dispute, the Hong sisters returned to television with Hotel del Luna. Starring Lee Ji-eun and Yeo Jin-goo as the owner and manager of a hotel catering exclusively to ghosts, the series was produced by GTist, a subsidiary of Studio Dragon, and directed by Oh Chung-hwan. It aired on tvN from July 13 to September 1, 2019. The drama became the most-watched tvN series of 2019, achieving a peak viewership rating of approximately 12%, and remains one of highest-rated Korean dramas in cable television history. It was also recognized as the most popular fantasy series on Viki in 2019.

In 2019, the they began developing the project alongside director Park Jun-hwa. By December 5 of that year, the series was in development for tvN under working title I saram tongyeogi doenayo? (이 사람 통역이 되나요?; 'Can this person interpret?'). The project was later renamed Guwonui tongyeok (구원의 통역; 'Interpretation of salvation'), with overseas filming scheduled in China, however it was cancelled due to the COVID-19.

The Hong sisters and Park subsequently pivoted to collaborate on a different tvN drama, Alchemy of Souls. Starring Lee Jae-wook, Jung So-min, Go Youn-jung, and Hwang Min-hyun, the story follows young mages navigating the realms of heaven and earth. The series aired on tvN and is available for streaming on TVING and Netflix in selected regions. The production was divided into two parts: Part 1 aired from June 18 to August 28, 2022, spanning 20 episodes, while Part 2, titled Alchemy of Souls: Light and Shadow, aired from December 10, 2022, to January 8, 2023, for 10 episodes.

=== Projects with Imaginus ===
The Hong sister took their previously cancelled project to their new company. Can This Love Be Translated resumed in 2023 under Trii Studio, a label under Imaginus, which also serves as the parent company of the Hong sisters' own label, Studio Sot, with new director Yoo Young-eun. The series follows the romance between polyglot interpreter Joo Ho-jin (Kim Seon-ho) and global actress Cha Mu-hee (Go Youn-jung) as they navigate differing love languages.

== Style ==
The Hong sisters's background in variety television has shaped their narrative approach, which prioritizes audience engagement through fast-paced storytelling. Jin-hyuk, the director of Master's Sun, observed: "Because entertainment is a competition based on minutes and seconds, I think the compulsion to change the channel even if it was boring for just one minute naturally led to training."

Their work is characterized by a blend of broad comedy and romantic elements, which often transition into more dramatic or melancholic tones during the latter half of their series. They are noted for a signature style that utilizes rapid narratives, puns and meta meta-fictional references, and quirky characters. Their approach frequently involves placing figures from classical literature or romance novels into contemporary settings and focusing on the personal growth of ordinary individuals rather than archetypal heroes.

The Hong sisters are also credited with broadening the range of their leading actresses by subverting common genre stereotypes in favor of dynamic, passionate female characters. Their dramas have facilitated significant shifts in public perception for several actresses. Han Chae-young transitioned from a "Barbie doll" image to portraying a plucky, diligent student in Sassy Girl Chun-hyang, while Lee Da-hae demonstrated comedic versatility in My Girl. Han Ye-seul successfully countered early criticism regarding her acting through her performance of a sharp-tongued heiress in Couple or Trouble. The writers publicly supported Sung Yu-ri for her performance in Hong Gil-dong, they posted strong praise and defense of her acting on the drama's website. Similarly, My Girlfriend Is a Nine-Tailed Fox provided Shin Min-ah with a career-defining role that helped distinguish her as an actress rather than a model.

== Filmography ==
Television series appearances
Broadcast period	Title		Ep.	Network	Director(s)	Rating		
Broadcast period	English	Korean	Ep.	Network	Director(s)	Highest	Lowest	Average
January 3 – March 1, 2005	Sassy Girl Chun-hyang	쾌걸 춘향	17	KBS2	Jeon Ki-sang, Ji Byung-hyun	31.3%	15.4%	23.8%
December 14, 2005 – February 2, 2006	My Girl	마이걸	16	SBS	Jeon Ki-sang	24.0%	14.0%	19.4%
October 14 – December 3, 2006	Couple or Trouble	환상의 커플	16	MBC	Kim Sang-ho	21.4%	9.9%	13.6%
January 2 – March 26, 2008	Hong Gil-dong	쾌도 홍길동	24	KBS2	Lee Jung-sub	16.9%	8.8%	14.5%
October 7 – November 26, 2009	You're Beautiful	미남이시네요	16	SBS	Hong Sung-chang	10.9%	7.5%	9.2%
August 11 – September 30, 2010	My Girlfriend Is a Nine-Tailed Fox	내 여자친구는 구미호	16	SBS	Boo Sung-chul	19.9%	8.7%	12.6%
May 4 – June 23, 2011	The Greatest Love	최고의 사랑	16	MBC	Park Hong-kyun, Lee Dong-yoon	21.0%	8.4%	16.0%
June 4 – July 24, 2012	Big	빅	16	KBS2	Ji Byung-hyun, Kim Sung-yoon	11.1%	7.4%	8.5%
August 7 – October 3, 2013	Master's Sun	주군의 태양	17	SBS	Jin Hyuk	21.8%	13.6%	17.2%
May 13 – July 2, 2015	Warm and Cozy	맨도롱 또똣	16	MBC	Park Hong-kyun, Kim Hee-won	8.8%	5.6%	7.4%
December 23, 2017 - March 4, 2018	A Korean Odyssey	화유기	20	tvN	Park Hong-kyun	6.942%	3.586%	5.415%
July 13 – September 1, 2019	Hotel del Luna	호텔 델루나	16	tvN	Oh Choong-hwan	12.001%	7.023%	8.867%
June 18, 2022 – January 8, 2023	Alchemy of Souls	환혼	30 (Note: The series was divided into two parts: Part 1 aired from June 18 to August 28, 2022, for 20 episodes, while Part 2 (Alchemy of Souls: Light and Shadow) aired from December 10, 2022, to January 8, 2023, for 10 episodes.)	tvN	Park Joon-hwa	9.651%	4.989%	6.665%
January 16, 2026	Can This Love Be Translated?	이 사랑 통역 되나요?	12	Netflix	Yoo Young-eun	—N/a		
TBA	Grand Galaxy Hotel	그랜드 갤럭시 호텔		Netflix	Oh Chung-hwan			

== Accolades ==
=== Awards and nominations ===
Awards and nominations
Award ceremony	Year	Category	Recipient(s)	Result	Ref.
Asian Academy Creative Awards	2019	Best Drama Series	Hotel del Luna	Nominated	
Baeksang Arts Awards	2012	Best Drama	The Greatest Love	Nominated	
Baeksang Arts Awards	2012	Best Screenplay (TV)	The Greatest Love	Nominated	
Baeksang Arts Awards	2023	Best Screenplay – Television	Alchemy of Souls	Nominated	
Korea Drama Awards	2011	Best Writer(s)	The Greatest Love	Nominated	
Korea PD Awards	2012	Production Category Award: TV Writer Category	The Greatest Love	Won	
MBC Drama Awards	2011	Drama of the Year	The Greatest Love	Won	
MBC Drama Awards	2011	Writer(s) of the Year	The Greatest Love	Won	
New York Television Festival International TV & Films Awards	2012	Silver Prize, Miniseries category	The Greatest Love	Won	
Seoul International Drama Awards	2012	Outstanding Korean Drama	The Greatest Love	Nominated	
Seoul International Drama Awards	2014	Outstanding Korean Drama	Master's Sun	Nominated	

=== State honors ===
Name of country, year given, and name of honor
Country	Ceremony	Year	Honor Or Award	Ref.
South Korea	Korean Popular Culture and Arts Awards (Note: Honors are given at the Korean Popular Culture and Arts Awards, arranged by the Korea Creative Content Agency and hosted by the Ministry of Culture, Sports and Tourism. They are awarded to those who have contributed to the arts and South Korea's pop culture.)	2012	Minister of Culture, Sports and Tourism Commendation	
