= Red Swan (TV series) =

2024 South Korean television series

- Promotional poster
- Hangul: 화인가 스캔들
- Lit.: Hwain Family Scandal
- RR: Hwainga seukaendeul
- MR: Hwain'ga sŭk'aendŭl
- Genre: Romance; Revenge drama
- Written by: Choi Yoon-jung
- Directed by: Park Hong-kyun
- Starring: Kim Ha-neul; Rain
- Music by: Lee Ji-young
- Country of origin: South Korea
- Original language: Korean
- No. of episodes: 10

Production
- Executive producers: Jung Tae-won; Lee Seung-won; Ham Jin; Kim Young-chan
- Producer: Noh Joon-pyo
- Cinematography: Song In-hyuk; Im Hyung-joon
- Editor: Hwang Yi-seul
- Running time: 49–69 minutes
- Production companies: Taewon Entertainment; Studio&NEW

Original release
- Network: Disney+
- Release: July 3 – July 31, 2024

Red Swan (Korean: 화인가 스캔들) is a 2024 South Korean romance revenge drama television series written by Choi Yoon-jung directed by Park Hong-kyun, and starring Kim Ha-neul and Rain. It was released on Disney+ from July 3 to 31, 2024.

== Synopsis ==
Red Swan tells the story of Oh Wan-soo, a woman born into a poor family, who turns her life around and becomes a world-class golfer, catching the attention of many, including her future husband, Kim Yong-kook, the heir to the Hwain Group. Struggling to pay off her mother's debts, Wan-soo agrees to marry Yong-kook, but soon becomes unhappy when she finds out about her husband's affair. For over a decade, she lives with her husband and is determined to make it work, but things begin to change quickly when she faces the biggest night of her life. Shortly after arriving in Manila for the first time as a Goodwill Ambassador, Wan-soo is caught in a terrorist attack, but narrowly escapes death thanks to Seo Do-yoon, who eventually becomes her bodyguard. Soon after, both Wan-soo and Do-yoon develop feelings for each other and Wan-soo reflects on her life up until that night, but is unsure of Do-yoon's true motivations for working for the Hwain Group.

== Cast and characters ==
=== Main ===
- Kim Ha-neul as Oh Wan-soo

A golf player who rises to the top, marries the heir of Hwain Group, becomes chairman of the foundation, and gains global fame through philanthropic activities.

- Rain as Seo Do-yoon

A police-turned-bodyguard who possesses excellent martial arts skills. He joins the Hwain Group's security team with his own purpose and takes the duty to protect Wan-soo.

=== Supporting ===
- Jung Gyu-woon as Kim Yong-kook

The heir of Hwain Group and Wan-soo's husband.

- Seo Yi-sook as Park Mi-ran

Chairman of Hwain Group.

- Yoon Je-moon as Han Sang-il

The legal representative of Hwain Group.

- Ki Eun-sae as Jang Tae-ra

Yong-kook's mistress.

- Go Yoon as Kim Yong-min

Yong-kook's younger brother and Cosmo Cosmetics's Vice President.

- Kim Yoon-ji as Seo Ji-yeon

The daughter of Cosmo Group, Yong-min's wife, and CEO of Cosmo Cosmetic.

- Fila Lee as Kyung-sook

A maid who is in charge of the Hwain Family's household.

== Production and release ==
In May 2023, Disney+ confirmed Kim Ha-neul and Rain to lead the series. Park Hong-kyun, who directed New Heart (2007), Queen Seondeok (2009), and The Greatest Love (2011), and Choi Yoon-jung, who wrote Three Sisters (2010) and Only Love (2014), took in charged as the director and writer, respectively. Studio&NEW and Taewon Entertainment co-managed the production.

The series would be released on Disney+ on July 3, 2024, with 10 episodes. It will also be available to stream on Hulu in the United States.
