= Ghost House (2004 film) =

- Poster for Ghost House
- Hangul: 귀신이 산다
- RR: Gwisini sanda
- MR: Kwisini sanda
- Directed by: Kim Sang-jin
- Written by: Jang Jae-yeong
- Produced by: Lee Min-ho; Kang Woo-suk
- Starring: Cha Seung-won; Jang Seo-hee
- Cinematography: Lee Gi-won
- Edited by: Ko Im-pyo
- Music by: Sohn Moo-hyun
- Distributed by: Cinema Service
- Release date: September 17, 2004
- Running time: 119 minutes
- Country: South Korea
- Language: Korean
- Budget: US$3.7 million

Ghost House is a 2004 South Korean horror-comedy film directed by Kim Sang-jin. It was released in South Korea on September 7, 2004, and was the fourth best selling film of the year with 2,890,000 tickets sold.

== Plot ==
Pil-gi (Cha Seung-won) has finally saved enough money to make his late father's wish come true: he can buy his own house. However, upon moving into his new residence, he is bothered by one of its previous residents, a poltergeist, who claims the house belongs to it and attempts to scare him out. Pil-gi will not give up on his dream so easily, though. He calls the police, invites friends to stay for the night, and tries exorcism rituals. None of it works. During one attack by the poltergeist he is struck by lightning and awakes in a hospital. He eventually decides it would be best to sell the house, but upon returning he discovers that he can see the ghost who has been haunting him. She reveals that her name is Yeon-hwa (Jang Seo-hee) and, now less frightened, Pil-gi talks to her and he decides to stay. However, an investor looking to build a new hotel on the site makes Pil-gi an offer to buy the house. Now, it is Yeon-hwa's turn to be afraid. She begs him not to sell the house and tells him her life story. Pil-gi vows to help her keep her house.

== Cast ==
- Cha Seung-won as Pil-gi
- Jang Seo-hee as Yeon-hwa
- Jang Hang-sun as Jang Kil-bok
- Son Tae-young as Soo-kyung
- Jin Yoo-young as property developer
- Yoon Moon-sik as Pil-gi's father
- Jang Hyun-sung as Park Gi-tae
- Jang Hang-jun as property house owner
- Park Yeong-gyu as man crawling out of TV set
- Tae In-ho as a group member near the police station

== See also ==
- Haunted house
- List of ghost films
