= Break Out (film) =

- Theatrical release poster
- Directed by: Jang Hang-jun
- Written by: Park Jung-woo
- Produced by: Lee Jun-taek; Baek Nam-su; Lee Gwan-su
- Starring: Kim Seung-woo; Cha Seung-won
- Cinematography: Kim Sung-bok
- Edited by: Ko Im-pyo
- Music by: Yoon Jong-shin
- Distributed by: Cinema Service
- Release date: 17 July 2002
- Running time: 105 minutes
- Country: South Korea
- Language: Korean

Break Out (Korean: 라이터를 켜라; RR: raiteoreul kyeora; lit. 'Spark the Lighter') is a 2002 South Korean action comedy film directed by Jang Hang-jun, and starring Kim Seung-woo and Cha Seung-won. The film was released on July 17, 2002.

== Plot ==
A loser, Bong-gu (Kim Seung-woo), attends a high school reunion, where he is ridiculed for his lack of accomplishments. The next day he goes to the country for army reserve training, where he encounters further humiliation and failure. With his last few won he purchases a cheap cigarette lighter. With no other way home, he shares a taxi to Seoul train station with a fellow reservist and malcontent named Bum-soo (Kang Sung-jin).

While at the station, Bong-gu leaves his lighter in a bathroom stall, where it is purloined by a gangster, Yang Chul-gon (Cha Seung-won). Enraged beyond endurance, Bong-gu demands the lighter back, provoking a beating from the gangster's underlings. Undeterred, he follows Chul-gon onto a train. There, Chul-gon has more important business to attend to, waylaying a senator (Park Yeong-gyu) whom he had helped into office but who has since refused to reciprocate with any political favors. When the senator stubbornly refuses to concede, Chul-gon takes the entire train hostage. Meanwhile, Bong-gu will stop at nothing to recover his lighter.

== Cast ==
- Kim Seung-woo as Heo Bong-gu
- Cha Seung-won as Yang Chul-gon
- Park Yeong-gyu as Park Yeong-gab
- Kang Sung-jin as Bum-soo
- Lee Moon-sik
- Yoo Hae-jin
- Kim Chae-yeon
- Bae Jung-sik
- Park Jae-hyun
- Han Bo-ram
- Jung Eun-pyo
- Jang Hyun-sung
- Jang Hang-jun
- Kim In-moon
- Kim Sun-kyung
- Lee Won-jong
- Im Hyung-joon
- Sung Ji-ru
- Kim Sung-kyum
- Jung Woo
- Yoon Young-geol
- Shin Hyun-sung
- Park Jun-se
- Lee Cheol-min
- Kim Ji-young as Bong-gu's mother
- Kong Yoo-seok as pilot 2
- Nam Moon-chul as senior executive 3
- Kim Kyung-ae as female cleaner
- Jang Nam-yeol as crewman
- Kim Min-kyo as elementary school alumni
