= Sung Ji-ru =

South Korean actor

- Born: October 16, 1968 (age 57); Gongju, South Chungcheong Province, South Korea
- Occupation: Actor

Korean name
- Hangul: 성지루
- RR: Seong Jiru
- MR: Sŏng Chiru

Sung Ji-ru (born October 16, 1968) is a South Korean actor.

== Filmography ==
=== Film ===
Year	Title	Role	Notes/Ref.
1994	Sado Sade Impotence		
2001	Tears	Yong-ho	
2001	Kick the Moon		
2002	A.F.R.I.K.A.		
2002	Public Enemy		
2002	Break Out	Man-soo	Cameo
2002	Marrying the Mafia	Jang Seok-tae	
2002	The Hidden Princess		
2002	H	Detective Park	
2003	My Teacher, Mr. Kim	Chun-shik	
2003	Memories of Murder		
2003	Crazy First Love		
2003	A Good Lawyer's Wife		
2003	Spring Breeze		Cameo
2005	A Bold Family		
2006	The Customer is Always Right	Ahn Chang-jin	
2007	Paradise Murdered	Han Choon-bae	
2008	Forever the Moment	Jin-gook	Cameo
2008	Santamaria	Shin Ho-cheol	
2008	Scandal Makers	Lee Chang-hoon	Cameo
2009	If You Were Me 4		Segment: "Blue Birds on the Desk"
2010	No Mercy	Yoon Jong-kang	
2010	Le Grand Chef 2: Kimchi Battle	Yeo-sang	Special appearance
2010	Secret Love	Inn owner	Special appearance
2010	Happy Killers	Taxi driver	Cameo
2011	Children	Jung-ho's father	
2011	Sunny	Ha Chun-hwa's lawyer	
2013	Fists of Legend	Seo Kang-gook	
2014	Red Carpet	CEO	Cameo
2014	Big Match	Booker	Special appearance
2019	Cheer Up, Mr. Lee	Jeong-kwon	
2022	Vanishing	Detective Jae-yeong	Korean-French film
2022	Awake	Dong-hyeok	

=== Television series ===
Year	Title	Role
2003	Ang-sook	
2003	Fairy and Swindler	Min Jae-soo
2004	Into the Storm	Gong Soo-chang
2004	Ms. Kim's Million Dollar Quest	Jo Min-ho
2006	Special of My Life	Baek Dong-koo
2007	Time Between Dog and Wolf	Byun Dong-suk
2008	Lobbyist	Yoo Sung-shik
2008	Star's Lover	Seo Tae-suk
2010	OB & GY	Joon-suk (guest), episodes 4-5)
2010	Becoming a Billionaire	Woo Byung-doo
2010	Chosun Police 2	Choi Do-gon
2011	Detectives in Trouble	Nam Tae-shik
2011	Warrior Baek Dong-soo	Hwang Jin-gi
2011	Lights and Shadows	Shin Jung-goo
2012–2013	Ugly Miss Young-ae 11	Sung Ji-ru
2013	King of Ambition	Uhm Sam-do
2013	Special Affairs Team TEN 2	Ma Seok-gi (episodes 11-12)
2013	Goddess of Fire	Shim Jong-soo
2013	The King's Daughter, Soo Baek-hyang	Dae-woon
2013	KBS Drama Special: "My Dad is a Nude Model"	Tae-joong
2014	A Witch's Love	Security guard (cameo, episodes 1-2)
2014	You're All Surrounded	Lee Eung-do
2014	Dr. Frost	Nam Tae-bong
2014	Righteous Love	(cameo)
2015	Assembly	Byun Sung-ki
2016	Monster	Go Joo-tae (guest)
2016	Second to Last Love	Dok Go-bong
2017	A Korean Odyssey	Soo Bo-ri
2017	School 2017	Ra Sun-bong
2018	Sweet Revenge 2	Oh Ji-na's father
2018	Ms. Ma, Nemesis	Jo Chang-gil
2019	Rookie Historian Goo Hae-ryung	Heo Sam-bo
2021	The Penthouse: War in Life 3	Cameo
2021–2022	Bad and Crazy	Bong-pil
2022	Insider	Heo Sang-soo
2022	That Guy's Voice	Natsume
2024	Begins ≠ Youth	a disciplinarian
2024	Marry You	Jin Si-Wan

== Awards and nominations ==
Year	Award	Category	Nominated work	Result
2003	SBS Drama Awards	Excellence Award, Best Actor in a Drama Short	Ang-sook	Won
2007	28th Blue Dragon Film Awards	Best Supporting Actor	Paradise Murdered	Nominated
2007	6th Korean Film Awards	Best Supporting Actor	Paradise Murdered	Won
2014	SBS Drama Awards	Special Award, Actor in a Drama Special	You're All Surrounded	Nominated
