= Rebound (2023 film) =

2023 South Korean sports drama film

- Theatrical release poster
- Hangul: 리바운드
- RR: Ribaundeu
- MR: Ribaundŭ
- Directed by: Jang Hang-jun
- Written by: Kwon Seong-hui; Kim Eun-hee
- Produced by: Jang Won-seok; Kim Young-hoon; Ha Jung-woo
- Starring: Ahn Jae-hong; Lee Shin-young; Jeong Jin-woon; Kim Taek; Jung Gun-joo; Kim Min; Ahn Ji-ho
- Cinematography: Moon Yong-gun; Kang Joo-sin
- Edited by: Heo Sun-mi; Ji Hyung-jin
- Music by: Kang Nene
- Production companies: B.A. Entertainment; Walkhouse Company; Nexon
- Distributed by: Barunson E&A
- Release date: April 5, 2023
- Running time: 122 minutes
- Country: South Korea
- Language: Korean
- Box office: $5.3 million

Rebound (Korean: 리바운드; RR: Ribaundeu) is a 2023 South Korean sports drama film directed by Jang Hang-jun. Kim Eun-hee and Kwon Seong-hui wrote the screenplay based on the true story of basketball coach Kang Yang-hyeon and the Busan Jungang High School's 2012 run to the national championships final despite having only six players on its roster. The film stars Ahn Jae-hong as coach Kang and Lee Shin-young, Jeong Jin-woon, and Jung Gun-joo as the players. It was released theatrically in South Korea on April 5, 2023.

== Synopsis ==
The once-renowned basketball team of Jungang High School in Busan is in shambles and on the verge of being shut down after years of poor performance. Alumnus Kang Yang-hyeon, who had been on the coaching staff of the U-16 boys' national team, is brought in as the new head coach, but his appointment sparks many players to walk out as they refuse to play under a still-relatively unknown coach. After some convincing, Coach Kang manages to scrape together a ragtag team of six players, most of whom were rejected by other top basketball schools, for the upcoming National Basketball Championships. He tries to engrain in them the mindset of teamwork and not wasting any loose balls, as summarized by his motto: "There is no such thing as missed shots, only rebounds!"

== Cast ==
- Ahn Jae-hong as Coach Kang Yang-hyeon
- Lee Shin-young as Cheon Ki-beom, captain; #7
- Jeong Jin-woon as Bae Gyoo-hyeok; #10
- Kim Taek as Hong Soon-gyu; #11
- Jung Gun-joo as Jung Kang-ho; #23
- Kim Min as Heo Jae-yoon, sixth man; #14
- Ahn Ji-ho as Jung Jin-wook; #4
- Lee Jun-hyeok as Head coach
- Roh Kyung as basketball coach from another school
- Jang Hyun-sung as Yongsan High School coach
- Kim Jin-soo
- Jo Hyun-il as Narrator
- Park Jae-min as Narrator
- Lee Seok-min as Heo Hoon
- Kim Joon-hyung as Kang Sang-jae
- Yang Han-yeol as Former student
- Jang Woo-nyeong as Player #12 at Anyang High School
- Lee Dae-hee as Han Jun-young

== Production ==
=== Background and development ===
The premise of the plot was the 2012 edition of the National Basketball Championships, an annual high school tournament run by the Korea Secondary Schools Basketball Federation. Once a renowned basketball school, Jungang High School had been on the verge of shutting down the basketball program after years of poor performance and stagnation, a stark contrast to their opponents in the final, Seoul powerhouses Yongsan High School. Despite losing to a Heo Hoon-inspired Yongsan High School, the Jungang High School team was given a standing ovation by the spectators and their story quickly caught the attention of the media. Jungang High School's captain Cheon Ki-beom went on to play for Yonsei University and Seoul Samsung Thunders.

The story came to the attention of the production team of BA Entertainment, best known for the Crime City film series, but plans for a film adaptation remained in development hell for a decade. Kim Eun-hee joined hands with screenwriter Kwon Sung-hui, to write a script for the film.

=== Casting and filming ===
In February 2022, the casting was finalized and principal photography began the following month. Ahn Jae-hong was cast as coach Kang Yang-hyeon. Lee Shin-young, Jeong Jin-woon, Jung Gun-joo, Ahn Ji-ho, Kim Taek, and Kim Min portrayed the Jungang High School players.

The actors portraying Kang and the Jungang High School players spent several months learning to play basketball and filmed on location at the school's basketball court. The production notably received support from the Korean Basketball League and the domestic basketball community. The KBL allowed its referees to serve as technical consultants and portray the referees and match officials. Former men's national team coach Cho Sang-hyun oversaw the auditions for extras to portray players from the opposing teams. Jo Hyun-il, one of the two narrators, is a veteran basketball commentator. Initially schools or opponents were not to be mentioned or explicitly named but the production team decided against it to add more realism to the plot and obtained permission from Yongsan High School as well as Whimoon High School, Jemulpo High School and Anyang High School to use their school names and logos in the tournament scenes.

The film was selected for the Busan Film Commission's 2022 'Busan Location Incentive Support Project' and received an incentive of ₩40 million. It was filmed in Busan at Jungang High School, Tombstone Culture Village, former Dongbusan University, Yeongdo Bridge, Sunrise Observatory, Oncheon Stream, Chungmu-dong Dawn Market, Yeongju Citizen's Apartment, and Daeyeon Cultural Park. Filming was wrapped up on July 29, 2022.

== Release ==
The film was released on April 5, 2023 in South Korea and was pre-sold in the United Kingdom, Australia, New Zealand, Taiwan and Singapore. It was officially invited to the 25th Udine Far East Film Festival, which was held from April 21 to 29, where it won second place at podium alongside Abang Adik of Malaysia.

In July 2023 it had its New York Premiere in 'South Korea at the Forefront' section at the 22nd New York Asian Film Festival on July 15, 2023.

== Reception ==
=== Box office ===
The film was released on April 5, 2023 on 1102 screens. It opened at 2nd place on the South Korean box office with 32,926 people viewing the film.

As of June 10, 2023, with gross of US$5,160,187 and 695,630 admissions, it is at the 6th place among the South Korean films released in 2023.

=== Critical response ===
Jeon Hyung-hwa, writing for Ilgan Sports, called the film a "precious, fun and passionate second chance." Praising Ahn Jae-hong's performance as coach Kang Yang-hyun, he concluded, "Rebound has no enemies, as there are opponents, but not enemies." He added, "If it had been a movie where winning or losing was important, it would have fleshed out an enemy, in which case it would have been punchier, but this movie chose [to highlight] the process, not victory or defeat."

The film received praise for its realism as a sports-centered biopic. Retired player Ha Seung-jin praised the attention to detail, especially in scenes of the tournament games, and noted that it never came across as awkward, even to a former professional basketball player like himself.

== Accolades ==
Year	Award	Category	Recipient(s)	Result	Ref.
2023	25th Udine Far East Film Festival	Golden Mulberry: Audience Award	Rebound	2nd place	
2023	Buil Film Awards	Best New Actor	Lee Shin-young	Nominated	
2023	Grand Bell Awards	Best New Actor	Lee Shin-young	Nominated	
2023	Blue Dragon Film Awards	Best New Actor	Lee Shin-young	Nominated	
