= My Teacher, Mr. Kim =

- Theatrical release poster
- Hangul: 선생 김봉두
- Hanja: 先生 김봉두
- RR: Seonsaeng Gim Bongdu
- MR: Sŏnsaeng Kim Pongdu
- Directed by: Jang Kyu-sung
- Written by: Jang Kyu-sung; Lee Won-hyeong
- Produced by: Kim Mi-hee
- Starring: Cha Seung-won; Byun Hee-bong; Sung Ji-ru
- Cinematography: Kim Yun-su
- Edited by: Ko Im-pyo
- Music by: Jo Seong-woo
- Distributed by: Cinema Service
- Release date: March 28, 2003
- Running time: 117 minutes
- Country: South Korea
- Language: Korean

My Teacher, Mr. Kim (Korean: 선생 김봉두; lit. 'Teacher Kim Bong-du') is a 2003 South Korean comedy-drama film about a man's transformation from a flawed scoundrel into a conscientious teacher when he gets transferred to a rural village school.

== Plot ==
Kim Bong-doo is a young teacher in a Seoul elementary school. He comes to school later than the students, and is scolded by the principal every day. Instead of preparing lesson plans, he goes drinking at room salons, and he actively encourages and coaxes parents to give him bribe money in exchange for his favoring their children. But one day, he finally gets caught in the act, and becomes the target of parent complaints.

So Mr. Kim gets temporarily transferred to the boondocks, a branch school in a remote village in Gangwon Province. In the countryside, cell phones are useless and even buying cigarettes at the nearest corner store is out of the question. There are only five students in the whole school, and he's also discontented with the extremely naive villagers who offer him all sorts of vegetables and fruits instead of money. To make matters worse, a grumpy old man named Mr. Choi blackmails him into teaching him the Korean alphabet.

Driven to near insanity by boredom and peace, Mr. Kim maps out a plan to transfer all of his students to Seoul, thereby closing down the rural school. For starters, Mr. Kim begins an after-school program to focus on developing each student's special talents so that they'll want to get a better education in Seoul. Contrary to his bad intentions, this results in a happy, supportive environment for the children and the village community, such that the school officials reconsider their policy of closing down the school because of Mr. Kim's "wonderful devotion" to the kids.

But when a businessman unexpectedly appears, saying he'd like to turn the school into a survival game site, Mr. Kim becomes tempted by money once again.

== Cast ==
- Cha Seung-won as Kim Bong-doo
- Byun Hee-bong as Mr. Choi
- Sung Ji-ru as Chun-shik
- Lee Bom as Choi Ae-soon
- Lee Jae-eung
- Kim Eung-soo as Nam-ok's father
- Lee Jae-gu
- Ku Bon-rim
- Jung Jin-gak as Seoul principal
- Park Soo-il as leisure businessman
- Seo Hee-seung as Gangwon principal
