= Yang Han-yeol =

South Korean actor (born 2003)

- Born: August 17, 2003 (age 23); Incheon, Gyeonggi-do, South Korea
- Other name: Yang Han-yol
- Education: Icheon Jeil High School
- Occupation: Actor
- Years active: 2011–present

Korean name
- Hangul: 양한열
- RR: Yang Hanyeol
- MR: Yang Hanyŏl

Yang Han-yeol (Korean: 양한열; born August 17, 2003) is a South Korean actor. He is known for his roles in dramas such as Love & Secret, A Thousand Days' Promise, The Greatest Love, Goddess of Marriage and All of Us Are Dead.

== Filmography ==
=== Film ===
| Year | Title | | Role | Ref. |
| Year | English | Korean | Role | Ref. |
|---|---|---|---|---|
| 2011 | Detective K: Secret of the Virtuous Widow | 조선명탐정: 각시투구꽃의 비밀 | Young slave | |
| 2013 | Happiness for Sale | 미나문방구 | Tae-kwon | |
| 2013 | My Paparotti | 파파로티 | Sang-jin's son | |
| 2023 | Rebound | 리바운드 | Former student | |

=== Television series ===
| Year | Title | Role | Ref. |
|---|---|---|---|
| 2011 | The Greatest Love | Gu Hyung-kyu | |
| 2011 | A Thousand Days' Promise | Cha Ji-min | |
| 2011 | KBS Drama Special: My Wife Disappeared | Se-joon | |
| 2011 | High Kick: Revenge of the Short Legged | Yoon Ji-seok's admirer | |
| 2012 | I Need a Fairy | Ji-hoon | |
| 2012 | Full House Take 2 | Mon-ok's student | |
| 2012 | The King's Doctor | Ji-nyeong's friend | |
| 2013 | Thunder Store | Himself | |
| 2013 | Goddess of Marriage | No Jang-woo | |
| 2014 | You're All Surrounded | Park Min-soo | |
| 2014 | Thunder Store 2 | Himself | |
| 2014 | Love & Secret | Kwon Hyoek-min | |
| 2015 | She Was Pretty | Ji Sung-jun | |
| 2019 | Beautiful World | Lee Ki-chan | |
| 2019 | Abyss | Cha Min | |
| 2022 | All of Us Are Dead | Yoo Jun-seong | |
| 2024 | Frankly Speaking | Amusement park boy | |

== Awards and nominations ==
| Year | Award | Category | Work | Result | Ref. |
|---|---|---|---|---|---|
| 2011 | MBC Drama Awards | Best Young Actor | A Thousand Days' Promise | Won | |
| 2015 | MBC Drama Awards | Best Young Actor | She Was Pretty | Won | |
