= Cha Seung-won =

South Korean actor (born 1970)

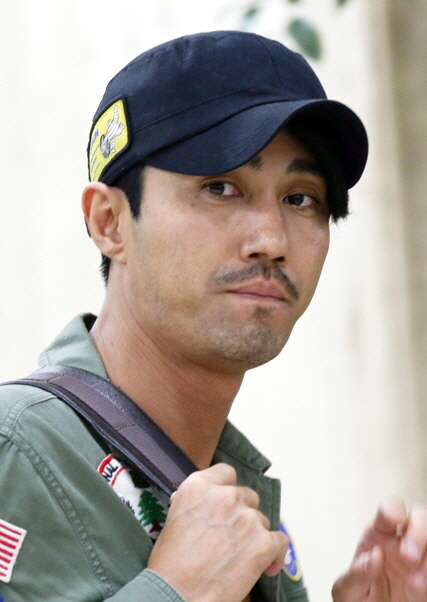
- Cha in September 2012
- Born: June 7, 1970 (age 56); Seoul, South Korea
- Occupations: Actor; model
- Agent: KeyEast
- Height: 1.88 m (6 ft 2 in)
- Spouse: Lee Soo-jin (m. 1992)
- Children: 2

Korean name
- Hangul: 차승원
- Hanja: 車勝元
- RR: Cha Seungwon
- MR: Ch'a Sŭngwŏn

Cha Seung-won (Korean: 차승원; born June 7, 1970) is a South Korean actor, who began his career as an in-demand fashion model in the 1990s. Cha achieved stardom through the hit comedy films Kick the Moon (2001), Jail Breakers (2002), My Teacher, Mr. Kim (2003), and Ghost House (2004). After proving his versatility in other genres, notably in the period thriller Blood Rain (2005) and the melodrama My Son (2007), Cha's popularity continued with the television series Bodyguard (2003), City Hall (2009), The Greatest Love (2011), A Korean Odyssey (2017), One Ordinary Day (2021) and Our Blues (2022).

== Career ==
Cha dropped out of Sungkyunkwan University, and began a successful career as a fashion model in 1988. He was cast in the TV sitcom New York Story, which would eventually pave the way for his debut in film.

Although his debut film Holiday In Seoul (1997) and many of his subsequent roles did not establish him as a major star, he attracted attention in 2000 for his performance as an arsonist in the firefighting film Libera Me. The following summer, the runaway success of Kim Sang-jin's comedy Kick the Moon (over 4.3 million tickets sold) secured his place in the industry as a leading actor with strong star appeal. Since then, Cha has become one of the few surefire box office draws in the country. In a 2005 survey of influential movie producers, he was ranked among the top ten most bankable stars in South Korea.

In early 2003, Cha took on a slightly more serious role as a corrupt schoolteacher who is transferred to a country school in the film My Teacher, Mr. Kim. The film grossed over 2.4 million admissions and drew Cha additional praise for his acting abilities (he would later team up again with director Jang Gyu-seong for 2007 comedy Small Town Rivals).

Cha appeared as a private bodyguard in KBS2's weekend drama Bodyguard aired in July, 2003.

His next role, in Ghost House, reunited him with director Kim Sang-jin in a successful comedy about a man who buys a dream home, only to discover it is haunted by a young female ghost.

In 2005, Cha put aside the comic roles he had become known for and appeared in the grisly period thriller Blood Rain. The film's unexpectedly robust commercial success confirmed Cha's popularity among Korean audiences. He further proved his versatility in Jang Jin's Murder, Take One (also known as The Big Scene). He was named as major film actor from his agency Gooder Better Entertainment.

Cha starred in his first melodrama Over the Border (2006), about a North Korean defector. He then reunited with Jang Jin in My Son (2007), and he said his experience as a father helped a lot in learning the character. Stylish crime thrillers Eye for an Eye (2008), and Secret (2009) followed.

Cha returned to television in 2009, in the political fairytale City Hall penned by writer Kim Eun-sook. 2010 was a busy year for him, with Cha appearing in two films, the Lee Joon-ik-helmed period actioner Blades of Blood, and Korean War film 71: Into the Fire, followed by spy series Athena: Goddess of War.

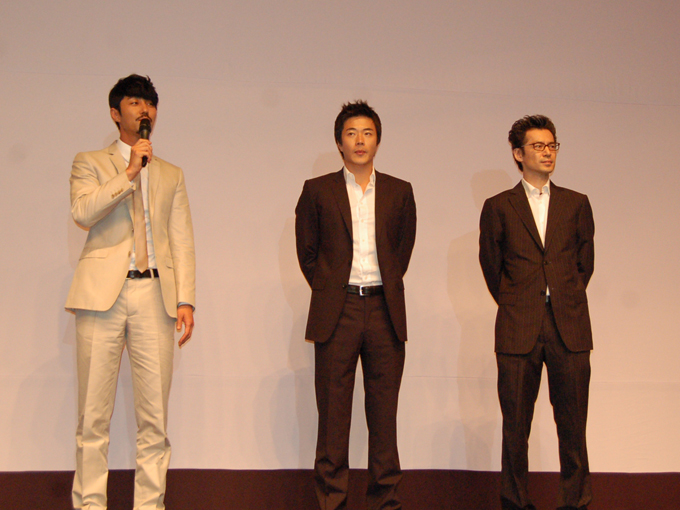
Cha (1st from left) in June 2010

In 2011 his character in the hit romantic comedy series The Greatest Love, arrogant top star "Dokko Jin," became a mini pop culture phenomenon, giving rise to numerous commercial deals and parodies, as well as awards for Cha.

Cha made his theater debut in 2012 in the stage play Bring Me My Chariot Fire alongside Japanese actors Tsuyoshi Kusanagi, Ryōko Hirosue, Teruyuki Kagawa, and Korean veteran actor Kim Eung-soo. Set in the historically turbulent early 1900s, the plot focuses on the friendship of artists from Korea and Japan who work together to preserve traditional Korean arts.

In 2014, Cha signed with the talent agency YG Entertainment, then starred in the police series You're All Surrounded. This was followed by his third team-up with director Jang Jin in the comedy noir film Man on High Heels, which subverted Cha's "macho" image by having him play a transgender homicide detective.

In 2015, Cha appeared in Three Meals a Day: Gochang Village, a cable reality show set on the remote Manjae Island for which he earned the nickname "Chajumma" (from the word ajumma) because of his versatile cooking skills despite the minimal amount of ingredients and implements. He was then cast as Prince Gwanghae in the period drama Splendid Politics, which focused on power struggles for the throne amid the backdrop of the Joseon Dynasty. Cha next plays cartographer and geologist Kim Jeong-ho in Kang Woo-suk's period epic Gosanja, Daedongyeojido, adapted from Park Bum-shin's novel The Map Maker.

In 2017, Cha was cast in tvN's fantasy romantic comedy drama A Korean Odyssey by the Hong sisters. Cha the starred in the family comedy-drama film Cheer Up, Mr. Lee in 2019 and the disaster film Sinkhole in 2021.

Later in 2021, he starred alongside Kim Soo-hyun in the Coupang Play's television series One Ordinary Day, based on the British television series Criminal Justice. In 2022, he appeared in the tvN drama Our Blues.

In October 2022, it was revealed that Cha will participate in film The Tyrant as one of the main characters. Initially The Tyrant was originally created with theater release in mind, but after filming was completed, it was edited in four-part series. The decision to expand it was made to effectively showcase the individual charm of each character and highlight the directorial expertise of Park Hoon-jung. It was announced as part of Disney+ 2024 lineup on February 19 and is set to premiere worldwide on August 14, 2024.

In March 2025, Cha left YG Entertainment and signed with new agency KeyEast.

== Personal life ==
Cha and his wife Lee Soo-jin are the biological parents of their daughter, Cha Ye-ni (born 2003, christened Rachel). In July 2014, a man claiming to be the biological father of Cha and Lee's son, Cha No-ah (born 1989, christened Noah), filed—and quickly withdrew—a ₩100 million defamation lawsuit against Cha. Following this, Cha acknowledged that No-ah is Lee's son from a previous marriage and that he legally adopted No-ah, who was three years old at the time, after marrying Lee. Cha had previously falsified his marriage date as 1989 to align with No-ah's age, later apologizing for intentionally providing the incorrect date to protect their son's knowledge of his paternity.

== Filmography ==
=== Film ===
Key
†	Denotes films that have not yet been released

Year	Title	Role	Notes	Ref.
1997	Holiday in Seoul	Leg model's boyfriend		
1998	If the Sun Rises in the West	Ji-min		
1999	Ghost in Love	Na Han-su		
1999	Attack the Gas Station	Runaway youth	Bit part	
1999	Fin de Siecle	Sang-woo		
2000	Black Honeymoon	Kim Joon-ho		
2000	Libera Me	Yeo Hee-su		
2001	Kick the Moon	Choi Ki-woong		
2002	Break Out	Yang Cheol-gon		
2002	Jail Breakers	Choi Moo-seok		
2003	My Teacher, Mr. Kim	Kim Bong-doo		
2004	Ghost House	Park Pil-gi		
2004	Lovely Rivals	Kim Bong-doo	Cameo	
2005	Blood Rain	Lee Won-gyoo		
2005	Murder, Take One	Choi Yeon-gi		
2006	Over the Border	Kim Sun-ho		
2007	Small Town Rivals	Jo Choon-sam		
2007	My Son	Lee Kang-shik		
2008	Eye for an Eye	Ahn Hyun-min		
2009	Secret	Kim Seong-yeol		
2010	Blades of Blood	Lee Mong-hak		
2010	71: Into the Fire	Park Moo-rang		
2012	Mr. XXX-Kisser	Himself	Cameo	
2014	Man on High Heels	Yoon Ji-wook		
2015	Minions	Narrator	Voice; Korean dub	
2016	The Map Against The World	Kim Jeong-ho		
2018	Believer	Brian Lee		
2019	Cheer Up, Mr. Lee	Chul-soo		
2021	Night in Paradise	Executive Ma		
2021	Sinkhole	Jeong Man-soo		
2023	Believer 2	Brian Lee		
2024	Uprising	Seonjo of Joseon		
2025	No Other Choice	Go Si-jo		

=== Television series ===
Key
†	Denotes television productions that have not yet been released

Year	Title	Role	Note	Ref.
1997	New York Story	Himself	Cameo	
1998	Song of the Wind	Lee Ji-hoon		
1998	Run Barefoot	Director Park		
1998	Shy Lovers	Im Sung-bom		
1998	Angel's Kiss	Jang Tae-ju		
1999	Roses and Bean Sprouts	Choi Gyu-dae		
1999	TV Movie: "Love Story"	Mr. Popular		
1999	Woman vs. Woman			
1999	I Show You The Taste	Seung-il		
2003	Bodyguard	Hong Kyung-tak		
2009	City Hall	Jo Gook		
2010	Athena: Goddess of War	Son Hyuk		
2011	The Greatest Love	Dokko Jin		
2014	You're All Surrounded	Seo Pan-seok		
2015	Splendid Politics	Prince Gwanghae		
2017	A Korean Odyssey	Woo Hwi-chul		
2021	One Ordinary Day	Shin Jung-han		
2022	Our Blues	Choi Han-soo		
2024	The Tyrant	Lim Sang-won		
2025	Mercy for None	Mr. Kim	Cameo	
TBA	Pigpen †	The pension's owner		
TBA	Tantara †	Gil-yeo	Post-production	

=== Television shows ===
Year	Title	Role	Notes	Ref.
1998	Lee Seung-yeon's Say Say Say	Co-host		
1998	GO! Our Heaven	Host		
1998	Kim Hye-soo Plus You	Co-host		
1998	Music Camp	MC		
2006	Cha Seung-won's Health Club (Sunday Sunday Night)	Cast member		
2015	Three Meals a Day: Fishing Village 1	Cast member		
2015	Three Meals a Day: Fishing Village 2	Cast member		
2016	Three Meals a Day: Gochang Village	Cast member		
2019	Korean Hostel in Spain	Cast member		
2020	Three Meals a Day: Fishing Village 5	Cast member		
2021	Hangout with Yoo	Guest		
2023	Follow Hyung to Maya	Cast member		
2024	Three Meals a Day Lite	Cast member		
2026	Cha's Family	Cast member		
2026	Bonjour Bakery	Cast member		

=== Music video appearances ===
Year	Title	Artist	Ref.
1998	"Even if the World Fools You"	Kim Jang-hoon	
1998	"Poison"	Uhm Jung-hwa	
2000	"I am a Man"	Kim Jang-hoon	
2001	"I Love You"	Position	
2002	"In My Heart"	4U	
2003	Project X		
2008	"Rain Shower"	Kim Jang-hoon	
2011	"Cry Cry"	T-ara	
2012	"Lovey Dovey"	T-ara	
2012	"I'm Sorry"	Lena Park	
2017	"Beautiful"	Wanna One	
2025	"Earthquake"	Jisoo	

== Theater ==
Theatre play performances
Year	Title		Role	Ref.
Year	English	Korean	Role	Ref.
2004	Taxi Driver	택시드리벌	Taxi passenger	
2012–2013	Bring Me My Chariot of Fire	나에게 불의 전차를	Lee Soon-woo	

== Accolades ==
=== Awards and nominations ===
Name of the award ceremony, year presented, category, nominee of the award, and the result of the nomination
Award ceremony	Year	Category	Nominee / Work	Result	Ref.
A-Awards (Note: Hosted by Arena Homme Plus Magazine)	2011	The Best Black Collar Workers of 2011 — Style Award	Cha Seung-won	Won	
A-Awards	2016	The Best Black Collar Workers of 2016 — Style Award	Cha Seung-won	Won	
APAN Star Awards	2015	Top Excellence Award, Actor in a Serial Drama	Splendid Politics	Nominated	
Asia Model Festival Awards	2010	Asia Special Award, Film category	Cha Seung-won	Won	
Asia Model Festival Awards	2015	Asia Star Award	Cha Seung-won	Won	
Baeksang Arts Awards	2003	Best Actor – Film	Jail Breakers	Won	
Baeksang Arts Awards	2004	Best Actor – Television	Bodyguard	Nominated	
Baeksang Arts Awards	2006	Best Actor – Film	Blood Rain	Nominated	
Baeksang Arts Awards	2012	Best Actor – Television	The Greatest Love	Nominated	
Best Dressed Awards	1995	Best Dressed, Model category	Cha Seung-won	Won	
Blue Dragon Film Awards	2000	Best Supporting Actor	Libera Me	Nominated	
Blue Dragon Film Awards	2001	Best Actor	Kick the Moon	Nominated	
Blue Dragon Film Awards	2003	Best Actor	My Teacher, Mr. Kim	Nominated	
Broadcast Advertising Festival	2022	CF Star Award	Cha Seung-won	Won	
Buil Film Awards	2021	Best Supporting Actor	Night in Paradise	Nominated	
Chunsa Film Art Awards	2007	Best Actor	My Son	Won	
Chunsa Film Art Awards	2021	Best Supporting Actor	Night in Paradise	Nominated	
Consumers' Day KCA Culture and Entertainment Awards	2024	Actor of the Year	The Tyrant	Won	
Elle Style Awards	2017	Super Icon (Male)	Cha Seung-won	Won	
Golden Cinema Film Festival	2002	Popularity Award	Kick the Moon	Won	
Golden Cinema Film Festival	2021	Cinematographers’ Choice Popularity Award	Sinkhole	Won	
Grand Bell Awards	2000	Best New Actor	A Century's End	Nominated	
Grand Bell Awards	2001	Best Actor	Libera Me	Nominated	
Grand Bell Awards	2003	Best Actor	My Teacher, Mr. Kim	Nominated	
Grimae Awards	2003	Best Actor	Bodyguard	Won	
Grimae Awards	2011	Best Actor	The Greatest Love	Won	
Hong Kong Cable TV Awards	2011	Best Actor	City Hall	Nominated	
KBS Drama Awards	2003	Popularity Award	Bodyguard	Won	
KBS Drama Awards	2003	Top Excellence Award, Actor	Bodyguard	Won	
Korea Advertisers Association	2003	Good Model Award	Cha Seung-won	Won	
Korea Best Dresser Swan Awards	1999	Best Dressed	Cha Seung-won	Won	
Korea Broadcasting Awards	2011	Best Actor	The Greatest Love	Won	
Korea Drama Awards	2011	Best Actor	The Greatest Love	Nominated	
Korea Drama Awards	2015	Grand Prize (Daesang)	Splendid Politics	Nominated	
Korea Fashion & Design Awards	2007	Fashion Icon Award	Cha Seung-won	Won	
Korea Fashion Association	1996	Male Model of the Year	Cha Seung-won	Won	
Korea Fashion Photographers Association	1995	Model of the Year	Cha Seung-won	Won	
Korea Jewelry Awards	2008	Sapphire Award	Cha Seung-won	Won	
Korea Lifestyle Awards	2011	Best Dressed of the Year – Male	Cha Seung-won	Won	
Korea Model Association	1995	Model of the Year	Cha Seung-won	Won	
MBC Drama Awards	2011	Best Couple Award	Cha Seung-won (with Gong Hyo-jin); The Greatest Love	Won	
MBC Drama Awards	2011	Top Excellence Award, Actor in a Miniseries	The Greatest Love	Won	
MBC Drama Awards	2015	Top 10 Stars Award	Splendid Politics	Won	
MBC Drama Awards	2015	Grand Prize (Daesang)	Splendid Politics	Nominated	
MBC Drama Awards	2015	Top Excellence Award, Actor in a Special Project Drama	Splendid Politics	Nominated	
Mnet 20's Choice Awards	2011	Hot Drama Star – Male	The Greatest Love	Won	
Mnet 20's Choice Awards	2011	Hot Male Body (Best Six-Pack)	Cha Seung-won	Won	
Model Center's Adieu Fashion Festival	1997	Grand Prize (Daesang) in Fashion	Cha Seung-won	Won	
Model Line	1995	Best Dressed Award	Cha Seung-won	Won	
SBS Drama Awards	2009	Excellence Award, Actor in a Drama Special	City Hall	Won	
SBS Drama Awards	2009	Top 10 Stars	City Hall	Won	
SBS Drama Awards	2011	Excellence Award, Actor in a Special Planning Drama	Athena: Goddess of War	Nominated	
SBS Drama Awards	2014	Top Excellence Award, Actor in a Drama Special	You're All Surrounded	Nominated	
Style Icon Awards	2011	Style Icon of the Year	Cha Seung-won	Won	
TVCF Awards	2007	Best CF Model for 2006	Cha Seung-won	Won	

=== State honors ===
Name of the organization, year presented, and the award given
Country	Award body	Year	Award	Ref.
South Korea	The Korean Popular Culture and Arts Awards (Note: Honors are given at the Korean Popular Culture and Arts Awards, arranged by the Korea Creative Content Agency and hosted by the Ministry of Culture, Sports and Tourism. They are awarded to those who have contributed to the arts and South Korea's pop culture.)	2017	Presidential Commendation	
South Korea	7th Finance Day (Note: Honors are given at a ceremony on Finance Day, which is designated on the last Tuesday of October every year. It is organized by the Financial Services Commission and is not a public holiday. Originally named Saving Day, it was created to encourage people's spirit of savings and promote savings, insurance, and securities businesses. Starting in 2016, Saving Day was changed to Finance Day. The Financial Services Commission explained the reason as "a measure that reflects the trend in which people's wealth formation methods have diversified from savings to fund investments, and the role of finance has expanded.")	2022	Chairman of the Financial Services Committee Commendation	

=== Listicles ===
Name of publisher, year listed, name of listicle, and placement
Publisher	Year	Listicle	Placement	Ref.
Forbes	2012	Korea Power Celebrity 40	25th	
Forbes	2016	Korea Power Celebrity 40	11th	
Korean Film Council	2021	Korean Actors 200 (Note: Introduces 200 actors that best represent the present and future of Korean cinema to the people in the film industry all over the world.)	Included	
The Screen	2009	1984–2008 Top Box Office Powerhouse Actors in Korean Movies	12th	
