= Jang Hang-jun =

South Korean filmmaker (born 1969)

- 장항준
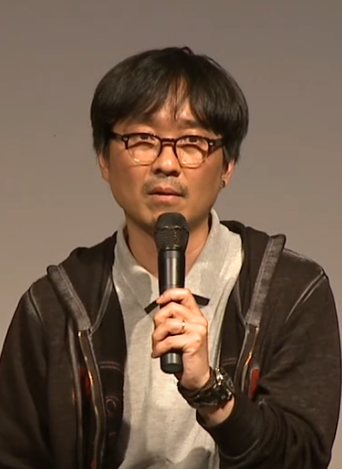
- Jang in 2014
- Born: September 17, 1969 (age 57); Daegu, South Korea
- Education: Seoul Institute of the Arts
- Occupations: Film director; television director; screenwriter
- Years active: 2002–present
- Agent: Media Lab Seeso
- Spouse: Kim Eun-hee (m. 1998)
- Children: 1

Korean name
- Hangul: 장항준
- RR: Jang Hangjun
- MR: Chang Hangjun

Jang Hang-jun (Korean: 장항준; born September 17, 1969) is a South Korean film and television director, screenwriter, and television personality. He is a professor in the Department of Theater and Film at Digital Seoul Culture Arts University. Jang is known for the 2026 historical film The King's Warden, which recorded over 16 million admissions, making it the second most-watched and highest-grossing film in South Korean box office history.

He made his directional debut in the 2002 film Break Out. Jang has directed the feature films Spring Breeze (2003), Forgotten (2017), Rebound (2023) and anthology The Killer.

== Early life ==
Jang was born in Daegu in 1969. He grew up in a privileged household provided with a personal driver and subject-specific tutors. Despite these advantages, Jang did not prioritize his studies, choosing instead to spend his time socializing with friends. This lifestyle changed during his second year of high school when his father's construction business went bankrupt. Following this shift in circumstances, Jang enrolled in a theater department in Seoul. During his studies, he discovered a deep passion for the arts and began to seriously evaluate his professional strengths.

== Career ==
After graduating, Jang secured a position as the youngest writer at a broadcasting station, an opportunity facilitated by a senior acquaintance. His role shifted unexpectedly after six months when the lead writer disappeared. In a surprising turn of events, a script Jang had previously written was adopted by the station, resulting in his promotion to Field Director.

While working as a writer for the SBS entertainment department on the show Good Friends, Jang found inspiration in his friend Jang Jin's success in the Spring Literary Contest. This achievement motivated him to transition from television entertainment to the film industry. He began focusing on screenwriting and gained significant recognition in 1996 with his script for The Adventure of Mrs. Park, which effectively launched his cinematic career.

In 2011, he co-wrote and directed Sign, a medical crime investigation drama starring Park Shin-yang and Kim Ah-joong.

In 2026, he wrote and directed the historical film The King's Warden. The film was released on February 4, 2026, coinciding with the Korean New Year holiday. It received positive reviews and did well at the box office.

== Philanthropy ==
Jang and his wife, Kim Eun-hee, donated 30 million won to the Children's Fund in Ukraine on March 4, 2022, to support those affected by the Russian invasion.

== Personal life ==
Jang married Kim Eun-hee in 1998. They have a daughter named Jang Yeon-soo.

== Filmography ==
=== Film ===
Year	Title		Credited as		Notes	Ref.
Year	English	Korean	Director	Writer	Notes	Ref.
1996	The Adventure of Mrs. Park	박봉곤 가출 사건	No	Yes		
1999	The Great Chef	북경반점	No	Yes		
2002	Break Out	라이터를 켜라	Yes	No		
2003	Spring Breeze	불어라 봄바람	Yes	Yes		
2008	Manner of Battle	전투의 매너	Yes	No	Television film	
2017	Forgotten	기억의 밤	Yes	Yes		
2020	The Night of the Undead	죽지않는 인간들의 밤	No	Co-writer (Note: cowriting with Shin Jeong-won)		
2022	Open the Door	오픈 더 도어	Yes	Yes		
2023	Rebound	리바운드	Yes	No		
2024	The Killers	더 킬러스	Yes	Yes	Segment: "Everyone Is Waiting For The Man"	
2026	The King's Warden	왕과 사는 남자	Yes	Yes		

=== Television series ===
Year	Title		Credited as			Ref.
Year	English	Korean	Director	Writer	Creator	Ref.
2010	Golden House	위기일발 풍년빌라	No	Yes	No	
2011	Sign	싸인	Yes	Yes	No	
2012-2013	The King of Dramas	드라마의 제왕	No	Yes	No	
2013	Who Are You?	후아유	No	No	Yes	

=== Acting credits ===
Film

Year	Title		Role	Ref.
Year	English	Korean	Role	Ref.
1996	The Adventure of Mrs. Park	박봉곤 가출 사건	Cameo	
2002	Break Out	라이터를 켜라		
2003	Spring Breeze	불어라 봄바람	Cameo	
2004	Ghost House	귀신이 산다	Luna Bar Building Manager	
2010	Attack the Gas Station 2		Director Jang	
2010	Loveholic			
2012	The Scent		Chinese restaurant owner	
2012	The Suck Up Project: Mr. XXX-Kisser		Cameo	
2012	Unbearable		Part-time Manager	
2014	Venus Talk			
2008	Hellcats			
2008	Manner of Battle			
2015	Trap		Cameo	
2016	My New Sassy Girl		Theater Company Director	

=== Television ===
Year	Title		Role	Ref.
Year	English	Korean	Role	Ref.
2001	Why Can't We Stop Them	웬만해선 그들을 막을 수 없다	Yoon Hang-jun	
2009–2010	High Kick Through the Roof		Brothers Water Purifier Repairman	
2011	Sign	싸인		
2011	The Greatest Love	최고의 사랑	Director Jang	
2012	I Need a Fairy			
2012	Phantom			
2012–2013	The King of Dramas	드라마의 제왕		
2013	Who Are You?	후아유		
2013	My Love from the Star		Director Park	
2014	Potato Star 2013QR3		Cameo	
2014	Pinocchio		Film director	
2022–2023	Unlock My Boss		Cameo	

=== Television shows ===
Year	Title	Role	Note(s)	Ref.
2007	Access! Movie World!	Host		
2010	Nightlife Variety Nightlife	Host		
2012	Korea's Got Talent 2	Judge		
2019	Song Eun-i, Kim Sook's Movie Guarantee	Cast		
2020–2021	The Story of the Day Biting the Tail S1	Host	Season 1 and 2	
2021	Crime Trivia	Cast member		
2022	The Dictionary of Useless Knowledge	Host		
2023	Very Private Southeast Asia	Cast Member		
2023	Listen, See, It's Okay	Director		

=== Web shows ===
Year	Title	Role	Ref.
2021	King of Quotes	Host	

=== Radio ===
Year	Title	Role	Ref.
2018-2019	Jang Hang-jun, Kim Jin-soo's Mister Radio	DJ	
2022	Bae Chul-soo's Music Camp	Special DJ (August 8)	

== Awards and nominations ==
Awards and nominations received by Jang
Award ceremony	Year	Category	Nominee / Work	Result	Ref.
Baeksang Arts Awards	2026	Gucci Impact Award	The King's Warden	Won	
Baeksang Arts Awards	2026	Best Film	The King's Warden	Nominated	
Baeksang Arts Awards	2026	Best Director – Film	The King's Warden	Nominated	
Brand Customer Loyalty Awards (Note: Brand Customer Loyalty Awards is annual event which selects and awards the most influential brands in society and popular culture, determined through national consumer surveys. It is organized by the Korea Consumer Forum and Brand Keys, a top 10 American brand consulting organization.)	2026	Most influential figure	Jang Hang-jun	Won	
Blue Dragon Film Awards	2026	Best Film	The King's Warden	Pending	
Blue Dragon Film Awards	2026	Best Director	The King's Warden	Pending	
Blue Dragon Film Awards	2026	Best Screenplay	The King's Warden	Pending	
Golden Cinematography Awards	2026	Best Director	The King's Warden	Won	
KBS Entertainment Awards	2018	Entertainment DJ of the Year Award	Jang Hang-jun, Kim Jin-soo's Mister Radio	Won	
Korea Entertainment Awards	2026	Best Director of the Year	The King's Warden	Won	
Korea First Brand Awards	2024	Entertainer of the Year	Jang Hang-jun	Won	

=== State honors ===
Name of the organization, year presented, and the honor given
Organization	Year	Honor	Ref.
Korean Popular Culture and Arts Awards	2026	Presidential Commendation	
