= Kim Ran-ju =

South Korean screenwriter (born 1984)

- Born: 1984 (age 41–42); South Korea
- Occupation: Screenwriter
- Years active: 2007–present
- Employer: Studio Yeoreumnal
- Organization(s): Korea Television and Radio Writers Association (KTRWA)

Korean name
- Hangul: 김란주
- RR: Gim Ranju
- MR: Kim Ranju

Kim Ran-ju (Korean: 김란주; born 1984) is a South Korean broadcast writer. She is known for her collaboration with acclaimed variety show directors Kim Tae-ho and Na Yeong-seok. She was also part of a writers team led by Lee Woo-jung for drama series Reply 1997 and Reply 1994.

== Career ==
Kim Ran-ju started her career as broadcast writer in MBC TV in 2007. In 2009, she joined 2 Days & 1 Night as the youngest writer. Through this work she formed connection with director Na Yeong-seok, as well as writers Lee Woo-jung and Kim Dae-ju.

In 2012, Kim joined a drama writer team led by Lee Woo-jung on the drama Reply 1997. The female lead character Seong Si-won in Reply 1997 is widely considered to be based on Kim's own experiences as a fan of the group H.O.T.

Kim then became a writer on Kim Tae-ho's MBC TV show, Infinity Challenge. She gained recognition after making a special appearance on the show alongside fellow writer Kim Yun-ui on the July 26, 2014, broadcast, with Kim showcasing her Muay Thai skill.

Following the conclusion of Infinity Challenge in 2018, Kim joined Lee Woo-jung's established company, Egg is Coming. Since its establishment, Egg is Coming acts as an outsourcing company for program production directed by Na Yeong-seok and Shin Won-ho, in collaboration with CJ ENM. She served as lead writer for Korean Hostel in Spain.

Kim established her own company, Studio Yeoreumnal, and its debut project was Bonjour Bakery. The variety show premiered on Coupang Play on Korean Parent's Day, May 8, 2026,

== Filmography ==
=== Television series ===
Series screenwriting credit
Year	Title		Network	Credited as		Ref.
Year	English	Korean	Network	Assistant writer	Lead writer	Ref.
2012	Reply 1997	응답하라 1997	tvN	Yes	No	
2013	Reply 1994	응답하라 1994	tvN	Yes	No	

=== Television show ===
Television show screenwriting credit
Year	Title		Network	Credited as		Ref.
Year	English	Korean	Network	Assistant Writer	Main Writer	Ref.
2007	Show Live	쇼바이벌	MBC	Yes	No	
2009	Cheerful Hero	명랑 히어로	MBC	Yes	No	
2009	One Night	일밤	MBC	Yes	No	
2009–2012	Happy Sunday: 2 Days 1 Night Season 1	1박 2일	KBS2	Yes	No	
2014–2018	Infinite Challenge	무한도전	MBC	Yes	No	
2019	Korean Hostel in Spain	스페인 하숙	tvN	Yes	No	
2019	Three Meals a Day Mountain Village	삼시세끼 산촌편	tvN	Yes	No	
2020	Friday Joy Package	금요일 금요일 밤에	tvN	Yes	No	
2020	Summer Vacation	여름방학	tvN	Yes	No	
2021	Youn's Stay	윤스테이	tvN	No	Yes	
2024	Fresh off the Sea	언니네 산지직송	tvN	No	Yes	
2025	Seasonal Man	제철남자	TV Chosun	No	Yes	
2026	Bonjour Bakery	봉주르빵집	Coupang Play	No	Yes	
