= Warm and Cozy =

2015 South Korean television series

- Promotional poster
- Also known as: Warm and Mild; Agreeably Warm
- Genre: Romance, Comedy
- Written by: Hong Mi-ran; Hong Jung-eun
- Directed by: Park Hong-kyun; Kim Hee-won
- Starring: Kang So-ra; Yoo Yeon-seok
- Composer: Lee Im-woo
- Country of origin: South Korea
- Original language: Korean
- No. of episodes: 16

Production
- Executive producers: Moon Seok-hwan; Oh Kwang-hee
- Producer: Han Hee
- Production location: Jeju Island
- Cinematography: Park Chang-soo; Hwang Seong-man
- Editor: Im Gyeong-rae
- Running time: 70 minutes
- Production company: Bon Factory Worldwide

Original release
- Network: MBC TV
- Release: May 13 – July 2, 2015

Warm and Cozy (Korean: 맨도롱 또똣; RR: Maendorong ttottot) is a 2015 South Korean television series starring Kang So-ra and Yoo Yeon-seok. Written by the Hong sisters as a twist on the fable of The Ant and the Grasshopper, it aired on MBC TV from May 13 to July 2, 2015 on Wednesdays and Thursdays at 22:00 for 16 episodes.

== Plot ==
Lee Jung-joo has struggled and worked hard all her life, but has never caught a break, leaving her perpetually grouchy. In her seven years as an administrative employee at a clothing company in Seoul, she has never missed a day of work. But that doesn't stop her from losing her job, her house and her boyfriend in quick succession, so she unwillingly sets off to start a new life in Jeju Island.

There, she meets Baek Gun-woo, chef and owner of the restaurant "Warm and Cozy.". Jung-joo met Baek Gun-woo previously during their nineteenth birthday and mistaken that they are twin. Jung-joo first mistakes him for a con artist, because he can't seem to help himself from telling charming lies left and right. Gun-woo is a laidback romantic from a wealthy family who only does what he feels like doing, including opening a restaurant on Jeju simply because that's where he first met his first crush. Jung-joo and Gun-woo clash over their different personalities and priorities, then gradually fall in love with each other.

== Cast ==
=== Main ===
- Kang So-ra as Lee Jung-joo

29 years old. She was working for 7 years in an underwear company in Seoul. When she lost her job, boyfriend and apartment, she moved to Sorang Town on Jeju island to start a new life.

- Yoo Yeon-seok as Baek Gun-woo

29 years old. Youngest child of a wealthy family. His siblings have different fathers and he is supported by his older brother. He opened a restaurant "Warm and Cozy" in Sorang Town to impress his first love. He is a talented chef, but lazy, working only for fun.

=== Supporting ===
- Jung Jin-young as Jung Poong-san, Gun-woo's friend working with him im "Warm and Cozy" restaurant
- Kim Sung-oh as Hwang Wook, mayor of Sorang Town, bachelor
- Seo Yi-an as Mok Ji-won, Gun-woo's first love
- Lee Sung-jae as Song Jung-geun, Gun-woo's older brother, president of Noblesse Resort
- Kim Hee-jung as Kim Hae-shil, haenyeo, president of Sorang Haenyeo Assoctiaton
- Lee Han-wi as Gong Jong-bae, man of many trades in Sorang Town
- Ok Ji-young as Cha Hee-ra, Gun-woo's older sister, director of entertainment agency
- Kim Mi-jin as Bu Mi-ra, writer living on Jeju.
- Lee Yong-yi as Noh Bok-nyeo, haenyeo of Sorang Town
- Gu Bon-im as Go Yoo-ja, haenyeo of Sorang Town
- Choi Sung-min as Park Dong-soo, Bu Mi-ra's husband
- Lee Sang-hyun as Assistant Jang, Song Jung-geun's personal assistant
- Choi Jae-sung as Jin Tae-yong, Gun-woo's father

=== Special appearance ===
- Lee Hwi-hyang as Baek Se-young, Gun-woo's mother (ep. 1)
- Lee Joong-moon as Hong Gap, Jung-joo's ex-boyfriend (ep. 1)
- Na Seung-ho as public official
- Go Kyung-pyo as Jung-min, Jung-joo's younger brother (ep. 1-2)
- Kim Won-hyo as Gyeongsang groom at the airport (ep. 1)
- Shim Jin-hwa as Seoul bride at the airport (ep. 1)
- Kim Kwang-kyu, as Mr Gong (ep. 1)
- So Ji-sub as Jeju restaurant owner (ep. 1)
- Muzie as Rooftop neighbor (ep. 1-2)
- Sam Okyere as Sam, a foreigner who joins the diving school on the island along with Jung-joo (ep. 5-9)
- Nam Hyeon-joo as Jung-joo's mother (ep. 11)
- Seohyun as Hwang Yura, Hwang Wook's niece (ep. 13)
- Son Ho-jun as Son Joon-hee, Gun-woo's friend (ep. 16)

== Ratings ==
- In the table below, the blue numbers represent the lowest ratings and the red numbers represent the highest ratings.
- NR denotes that the drama did not rank in the top 20 daily programs on that date.

Ep.	Original broadcast date	Average audience share			
Ep.	Original broadcast date	TNmS		AGB Nielsen	
Ep.	Original broadcast date	Nationwide	Seoul	Nationwide	Seoul
1	May 13, 2015	6.4% (NR)	7.8% (19th)	6.3% (NR)	7.3% (19th)
2	May 14, 2015	5.8% (NR)	7.5% (NR)	5.6% (NR)	6.5% (NR)
3	May 20, 2015	7.7% (19th)	10.1% (11th)	6.6% (20th)	7.5% (16th)
4	May 21, 2015	6.7% (NR)	8.4% (16th)	6.7% (20th)	7.4% (17th)
5	May 27, 2015	7.7% (16th)	9.1% (11th)	7.0% (18th)	7.7% (16th)
6	May 28, 2015	7.8% (17th)	11.0% (10th)	7.5% (16th)	8.3% (14th)
7	June 3, 2015	8.2% (17th)	9.8% (11th)	7.0% (19th)	8.1% (15th)
8	June 4, 2015	7.6% (19th)	10.2% (12th)	7.6% (17th)	8.2% (14th)
9	June 10, 2015	8.6% (17th)	10.9% (8th)	8.1% (15th)	8.8% (13th)
10	June 11, 2015	8.5% (18th)	11.3% (9th)	8.8% (18th)	9.2% (16th)
11	June 17, 2015	7.6% (18th)	10.3% (9th)	7.8% (15th)	8.7% (13th)
12	June 18, 2015	7.5% (19th)	9.2% (14th)	8.2% (15th)	9.0% (12th)
13	June 24, 2015	7.1% (NR)	9.0% (13th)	7.5% (17th)	7.8% (14th)
14	June 25, 2015	7.2% (20th)	9.2% (19th)	7.6% (19th)	8.6% (16th)
15	July 1, 2015	8.5% (16th)	11.0% (8th)	7.7% (15th)	8.4% (13th)
16	July 2, 2015	7.7% (18th)	9.0% (12th)	7.6% (17th)	8.3% (16th)
Average		7.5%	9.7%	7.4%	8.1%

== Original soundtrack ==
Warm and Cozy: Original Sound Track

Soundtrack album by Various Artists
- Released: June 26, 2015
- Genres: Pop, K-pop, soundtrack, R&B
- Labels: LOEN Entertainment; Bon Factory Worldwide

No.	Title	Artist	Length
1.	"Thank U"	K.Will	3:24
2.	"Butterfly"	Ha-neul Hae, Kong Bo-kyung	3:29
3.	"더 가까이" (A Little Closer)	Hyolyn	3:40
4.	"보이지 말아줘" (Please Don't Be Seen)	Jubee (Sunny Hill)	3:36
5.	"널 위한거야" (All for You)	Son Seung-yeon	4:09
6.	"Jeju Hands"	Voiture
7.	"라라 테마" (Lala Theme)	Voiture
8.	"Funning Guitar"	Various Artists	2:03
9.	"I Missing You"	Various Artists
10.	"In Deserted House"	Various Artists
11.	"Broken Heart"	Various Artists
12.	"Sea of Love"	Various Artists
13.	"Falling"	Various Artists
