= Korean Hostel in Spain =

South Korean television show

- Promotional poster
- Hangul: 스페인 하숙
- RR: Seupein hasuk
- MR: Sŭp'ein hasuk
- Genre: Reality show Travel documentary
- Written by: Kim Ran-ju
- Directed by: Na Young-seok
- Starring: Cha Seung-won; Yoo Hae-jin; Bae Jung-nam
- Country of origin: South Korea
- Original language: Korean
- No. of seasons: 1
- No. of episodes: 11

Production
- Production locations: Villafranca del Bierzo, Spain
- Running time: 80 minutes

Original release
- Network: tvN
- Release: March 15 – May 24, 2019

Korean Hostel in Spain (Korean: 스페인 하숙) is a South Korean variety show by tvN starring Cha Seung-won, Yoo Hae-jin and Bae Jung-nam. The cast run an albergue, a hostel specially catered to travellers hiking an 800 km pilgrimage known as the Camino de Santiago. The albergue is located in Villafranca del Bierzo, Spain, 187 km away from the pilgrims' destination of Santiago de Compostela. For 9 days, the cast provided passing travellers a comfortable resting space and warm Korean meals, targeted especially for Korean pilgrims who miss the taste of home while on the long journey. The show aired on Fridays at 19:10 (KST) from March 15 to May 24, 2019.

The show reunited Cha Seung-won and Yoo Hae-jin with producer Na Young-seok over 3 years after their last variety show together, Three Meals a Day: Fishing Village 2.

== Cast ==
- Cha Seung-won — main chef who prepares meals for the travellers and the cast
- Yoo Hae-jin — hostel manager in charge of reception and cleaning, who also handcrafts a variety of furniture for the hostel
- Bae Jung-nam — kitchen assistant who helps with food preparation and serving, groceries and miscellaneous tasks like making coffee

== Ratings ==
Average TV viewership ratings
Ep.	Original broadcast date	Average audience share (AGB Nielsen)	
Ep.	Original broadcast date	Nationwide	Seoul
1	March 15, 2019	7.591%	9.133%
2	March 22, 2019	8.345%	9.568%
3	March 29, 2019	9.205%	10.195%
4	April 5, 2019	9.173%	9.851%
5	April 12, 2019	8.479%	8.723%
6	April 19, 2019	8.941%	9.407%
7	April 26, 2019	11.687%	12.452%
8	May 3, 2019	9.820%	10.994%
9	May 10, 2019	10.203%	10.543%
10	May 17, 2019	10.080%	11.228%
11	May 24, 2019	6.496%	7.554%
Average		9.093%	9.968%
In this table, the blue numbers represent the lowest ratings and the red numbers represent the highest ratings.; Ratings listed above do not include commercial time, which regular ratings usually do.

Korean Hostel in Spain : South Korea viewers per episode (millions)

Season	Episode number											Average
Season	1	2	3	4	5	6	7	8	9	10	11	Average
1	1.881	2.118	2.094	2.238	2.117	2.065	2.681	2.308	2.346	2.304	1.454	2.146

Source: Audience measurement performed nationwide by Nielsen Media Research.
