= You're All Surrounded =

2014 South Korean television series

- Promotional poster
- Hangul: 너희들은 포위됐다
- Hanja: 너희들은 包圍됐다
- RR: Neohuideureun powidwaetda
- MR: Nŏhŭidŭrŭn p'owidwaetta
- Genre: Action; Crime; Romance
- Created by: Kim Young-sup (SBS Drama)
- Written by: Lee Jung-sun
- Directed by: Lee Myung-woo; Yoo In-shik (SBS)
- Starring: Lee Seung-gi; Cha Seung-won; Go Ara; Ahn Jae-hyun; Park Jung-min; Oh Yoon-ah; Sung Ji-ru
- Composer: Ha Geun-yong
- Country of origin: South Korea
- Original language: Korean
- No. of episodes: 20

Production
- Executive producers: Hwangbo Sang-mi; Park Song-yi
- Producer: Kim Si-hwan
- Running time: 75 minutes
- Production company: HB Entertainment

Original release
- Network: SBS TV
- Release: May 7 – July 17, 2014

You're All Surrounded (Korean: 너희들은 포위됐다) is a 2014 South Korean television series starring Lee Seung-gi, Cha Seung-won, Go Ara, Ahn Jae-hyun, Park Jung-min, Oh Yoon-ah, and Sung Ji-ru. It aired on SBS from May 7 to July 17, 2014, on Wednesdays and Thursdays at 21:55 (KST) for 20 episodes.

== Synopsis ==
After witnessing his mother's murder at a young age, Kim Ji-yong (Lee Seung-gi) became a detective in order to investigate his mother's death. He later changed his name to Eun Dae-gu to be unnoticed by his mother's killer. On his way, he reunites with Eo Soo-sun (Go Ara), who attended the same middle school and they gradually develop a romantic relationship. At the same time, he spies on his team leader, Seo Pan-seok (Cha Seung-won), believing that he is related to the killer of his mother's case. As he unravels the truth behind the incident 11 years ago, he learns about his past, identity as well as making deep connections with people around him.

== Cast ==
=== Main ===
- Lee Seung-gi as Eun Dae-gu / Kim Ji-yong
  - Ahn Do-gyu as young Ji-yong

He is brusque, intelligent (with an IQ of 150), and has a photographic memory. His problem with authority stems from his painful past; as a young boy named Kim Ji-yong living in Masan, his mother was murdered in front of his eyes when she attempted to testify as a witness to a crime. To avoid getting killed himself, he changed his name to Eun Dae-gu and grew up in an orphanage. He eventually becomes a detective to bring his mother's killer to justice, while spying on his boss Seo Pan-seok, whom he believes conspired with his mother's killer.

- Cha Seung-won as Seo Pan-seok

The short-tempered captain of the Violent Crimes Unit. A legend at the precinct, Pan-seok is known for his tireless commitment to hunting down the most notorious criminals and his success rate in closing difficult cases, as well as his vocal disdain for higher-ups who abuse their authority. He initially despises being assigned rookies to mentor but, after a rough start, becomes fond of them as they prove themselves. But he has never forgotten a long-ago unsolved case involving the murder of a witness and the subsequent disappearance of her son, Kim Ji-yong, a case which is inextricably linked to his own family tragedy: the accidental death of his young son.

- Go Ara as Eo Soo-sun
  - Ji Woo as young Soo-sun

Bold and persistent, Soo-sun applied seven times before being accepted into the police academy. She is the only female in the new class of officers. Soo-sun and Ji-yong went to the same middle school in Masan, but she initially doesn't recognize him in his present incarnation as Dae-gu.

- Ahn Jae-hyun as Park Tae-il

Tae-il is secretive and laidback, but has a way with the ladies. He was in his first year of residency before deciding to leave medicine and become a detective, a decision his family disapproves of which led to his estrangement from them. He is sometimes mocked for being a stereotypical "rich kid" from Gangnam but proves himself with his dedication.

- Park Jeong-min as Ji Gook

A geeky and talkative guy whose sole reason for applying to the force was because he wanted to live in Gangnam. He unexpectedly becomes best friends with Tae-il, and develops a crush on Soo-sun.

- Oh Yoon-ah as Kim Sa-kyung

Sa-kyung is a tenacious detective with strong convictions, whose personal goal is to pave the way for female cops to work in her precinct without being discriminated against. She is also Pan-seok's ex-wife, and the divorced couple are forced to work together when she is transferred to his police station as the new head detective of the Missing Persons Unit. She divorced him due to the grief and anger she felt over their son's death, but upon meeting again at the precinct, Sa-kyung and Pan-seok's love for each other resurfaces and they begin dating again.

- Sung Ji-ru as Lee Eung-do

Pan-seok's older colleague who looks upon the new recruits affectionately.

- Seo Yi-sook as Kang Seok-soon

The chief of police. She secretly sponsored and encouraged Dae-gu for eleven years up until police academy, but may have suspicious ties to Assemblyman Yoo, a crooked politician.

=== Supporting ===
- Im Won-hee as Cha Tae-ho
- Choi Hyo-eun as Park Soo-bin
- Jung Dong-hwan as Yoo Moon-bae
- Moon Hee-kyung as Yoo Ae-yeon
- Lee Ki-young as Shin Ji-il
- Oh Young-shil as Jang Hyang-sook
- Song Young-kyu as Jo Hyung-chul
- Lee Yi-kyung as Shin Ki-jae

=== Special appearances ===
- Kim Hee-jung as Kim Hwa-young, Ji-yong's mother (Ep. 1, 4, 17)
- Lee Yang-hee as Pan-seok's partner (Ep. 1, 10)
- Choi Jin-ho as Park Seung-ho (Ep. 1)
- Lee Han-na as Shim Hye-ji (Ep. 1)
- Yang Han-yeol as Park Min-soo (Ep. 1)
- Maeng Bong-hak as Teacher (Ep. 1)
- Seo Yoo-ri as Night club girl (Ep. 2)
- Park Hwi-soon as Man on blind date (Ep. 3)
- Kim Kang-hyun as Dokgo Soo, the stalker (Ep. 3–4)
- Choi Young-shin as Yoon-jung (Ep. 3–5)
- Lee Han-wi as Plastic surgery director Byung (Ep. 3)
- Jung Se-hyung as Kim Jae-min
- Choi Woo-shik as a perpetrator named Choi Woo-shik (Ep. 4)
- Kim Min-ha as Ji-hee, the student/hostage (Ep. 4)
- Jo Hwi-joon as Seo Joon-woo, Pan-seok's son (Ep. 5)
- Im Seung-dae as Prosecutor Han Myung-soo (Ep. 5–6, 19–20)
- Choi Woong as Kim Shin-myung, hit and run suspect (Ep. 5–6)
- Ahn Se-ha as Lee Young-gu, Shin-myung's chauffeur (Ep. 5–6)
- Kim Ji-young as Lee Hyun-mi (Ep. 6)
- Lee Geum-joo as Orphanage director (Ep. 6, 8)
- Baek Seung-hyeon as Song Seok-won (Ep. 8–9)
- Joo-ho as Song Seok-gu (Ep. 8–9)
- --- as the missing car mechanic (Ep. 10–11)
- Moon Ji-in as the mechanic's fiancée (Ep. 10)
- Han Yoo-yi as young Kang Seok-soon (Ep. 16)
- Seo Yoon-ah as Seo Kyung-eun (Ep. 16)
- Jung Dong-gyu as Kwon Hyuk-joo

== Production ==
While filming an action scene on June 9, 2014, Lee Seung-gi was poked in his left eye by a prop knife, causing corneal damage and an intraocular hemorrhage. His injury required Lee to rest for a few days, which resulted in the preemption of the 10th episode; a special aired instead on June 11, 2014.

== Original soundtrack ==
You're All Surrounded OST

Soundtrack album by Various artists
- Recorded: 2014
- Genre: Soundtrack
- Languages: Korean; English
- Label: Loen Entertainment

=== Part 1 ===
Released on May 29, 2014
No.	Title	Artist	Length
1.	"What's Wrong with Me? (나 왜이래)"	San E	3:20
2.	"What's Wrong with Me? (나 왜이래)" (Inst.)		3:20
Total length:			6:40

=== Part 2 ===
Released on May 30, 2014
No.	Title	Artist	Length
1.	"Love, That One Word (사랑 그 한마디)"	Taeyeon	3:55
2.	"Love, That One Word (사랑 그 한마디)" (Inst.)		3:55
Total length:			7:00

=== Part 3 ===
Released on June 05, 2014
No.	Title	Artist	Length
1.	"I'm in Love (사랑하나 봐)"	Lee Seung-chul	3:28
2.	"I'm in Love (사랑하나 봐)" (Inst.)		3:28
Total length:			6:56

=== Part 4 ===
Released on June 19, 2014
No.	Title	Artist	Length
1.	"I Only See You (그대만 보여요)"	Kwon Jin-ah	4:21
2.	"I Only See You (그대만 보여요)" (Inst.)		4:21
Total length:			8:42

=== OST Special ===
Released on June 20, 2014
No.	Title	Artist	Length
1.	"I'm in Love (사랑하나 봐)" (Ballad ver.)	Lee Seung Chul	3:19
2.	"I'm in Love (사랑하나 봐)" (Inst.)		3:19
Total length:			6:38

You're All Surrounded OST
No.	Title	Artist	Length
1.	"I'm in Love (사랑하나 봐)"	Lee Seung-chul	3:28
2.	"Love, That One Word (사랑 그 한마디)"	Taeyeon	3:55
3.	"What's Wrong with Me? (나 왜이래)"	San E featuring Kang Min-hee of Miss $	3:20
4.	"That Was You (그게 너였다)"	Ahn Jae-hyun	4:37
5.	"I Only See You (그대만 보여요)"	Kwon Jin-ah	4:21
6.	"One Love"	E.D.E.N	3:33
7.	"You Are All Surrounded"	Ha Geun-young and Ryu Min-ji	1:44
8.	"Teheran-ro, 114th Street, Number 11 (테헤란로 114길 11)"	Ha Geun-young and Ryu Min-ji	2:07
9.	"Gangnam Police Station P4 (강남경찰서 P4)"	Ha Geun-young	3:33
10.	"We Are Partners"	Ha Geun-young	2:28
11.	"One Hand's Length of Growth (한 뼘의 성장)"	Ha Geun-young	3:52
12.	"The End, and New Beginning"	Ha Geun-young	2:55
13.	"Trauma"	Ha Geun-young	3:02
14.	"A Person Coming (사람이 온다는 것은)"	Ha Geun-young	5:16
15.	"Photographic Memory"	Ha Geun-young	2:14
16.	"The Crime Occurred!"	Lee Yong-yoon	2:03
17.	"Justice for All"	Lee Yong-yoon	3:42
18.	"Top Secret"	Ha Geun-young	2:00

== Viewership ==
Episode	Broadcast date	Title	Average audience share			
Episode	Broadcast date	Title	TNmS Ratings		AGB Nielsen	
Episode	Broadcast date	Title	Nationwide	Seoul National Capital Area	Nationwide	Seoul National Capital Area
1	May 7, 2014	Teheran-ru, 114th Street, Number 11. Gangnam, Seoul	11.0%	14.1%	12.3%	13.9%
2	May 8, 2014	The Reason We Are Not Detectives	13.2%	16.2%	14.2%	15.8%
3	May 14, 2014	There Are No Rookie Detectives	11.5%	14.3%	12.1%	13.5%
4	May 15, 2014	It's Okay... It's Not Okay	14.0%	17.3%	12.8%	14.0%
5	May 21, 2014	Sometimes You Embrace and Live!	12.0%	15.0%	12.4%	13.5%
6	May 22, 2014	The Ocean Inside My Worn-Out Drawer	12.3%	14.9%	13.2%	14.0%
7	May 28, 2014	A Person Coming...	12.4%	15.6%	13.6%	15.1%
8	May 29, 2014	One Hand's Length of Growth	12.5%	14.8%	12.8%	13.4%
9	June 5, 2014	Top Secret	12.4%	15.4%	10.7%	11.7%
10	June 12, 2014	What Happened That Night	10.3%	11.8%	9.6%	9.9%
11	June 18, 2014	Catch That Bastard!	10.5%	12.4%	10.2%	11.0%
12	June 19, 2014	The End and the Beginning	11.6%	13.6%	11.0%	12.1%
13	June 25, 2014	I'll Be on Your Side	12.2%	15.4%	11.1%	11.6%
14	June 26, 2014	Crocodile Tears	13.1%	15.3%	11.9%	12.7%
15	July 2, 2014	Whether Coincidence or Fate	11.2%	13.4%	10.7%	11.5%
16	July 3, 2014	Things That Can't Be Hidden	12.0%	14.4%	11.8%	13.2%
17	July 9, 2014	Uncomfortable Truth	10.8%	13.7%	12.0%	13.6%
18	July 10, 2014	Without Blood or Tears	11.5%	13.9%	12.9%	14.2%
19	July 16, 2014	On Top of a Flying Man, There Is a Desperate Man	11.2%	13.4%	11.2%	11.9%
20	July 17, 2014	Freeze, You're All Surrounded	14.2%	17.0%	13.4%	14.0%
Average			12.0%	14.6%	12.0%	13.1%
Special	June 11, 2014	Special	6.6%	6.9%	6.5%	7.2%

== Awards and nominations ==
Year	Award	Category	Recipient	Result	Ref.
2014	7th Korea Drama Awards	Top Excellence Award, Actor	Lee Seung-gi	Nominated	
2014	16th Seoul International Youth Film Festival	Best OST by a Female Artist	Love, That One Word – Kim Tae-yeon	Won	
2014	SBS Drama Awards	Top Excellence Award, Actor in a Drama Special	Cha Seung-won	Nominated	
2014	SBS Drama Awards	Top Excellence Award, Actor in a Drama Special	Lee Seung-gi	Nominated	
2014	SBS Drama Awards	Excellence Award, Actress in a Drama Special	Go Ara	Nominated	
2014	SBS Drama Awards	Special Award, Actor in a Drama Special	Sung Ji-ru	Nominated	
2014	SBS Drama Awards	Special Award, Actress in a Drama Special	Oh Yoon-ah	Nominated	
2014	SBS Drama Awards	Netizen Popularity Award	Cha Seung-won	Nominated	
2014	SBS Drama Awards	Netizen Popularity Award	Lee Seung-gi	Nominated	
2014	SBS Drama Awards	Netizen Popularity Award	Go Ara	Nominated	
2014	SBS Drama Awards	Best Couple Award	Lee Seung-gi and Go Ara	Nominated	
