= Bangjangsan =

Mountain in South Korea

Highest point
- Elevation: 743 m (2,438 ft)
- Listing: Mountains of Korea
- Coordinates: 35°26′52″N 126°45′36″E

Geography
- Location: North Jeolla Province, South Korea

Bangjangsan is a mountain of North Jeolla Province, western South Korea. It has an elevation of 743 metres (2,438 ft).
