= Park Hong-kyun =

South Korean television director)

- 박홍균
- Education: Seoul National University
- Occupation: Television director
- Years active: 2002–present
- Agents: MBC (2003–2017); YG Studioplex (2017–present)

Park Hong-kyun (Korean: 박홍균) is a South Korean television director. Previously with Munhwa Broadcasting Corporation, he has been with YG Studioplex since 2017. He made his directorial debut in 2002 with Sinchoneseo Yuteonhada.

== Filmography ==
Year	Title	Ref.
2002	Sinchoneseo Yuteonhada	
2003	Argon	
2004	Age of Heroes	
2006	So In Love	
2007	New Heart	
2009	Queen Seondeok	
2011	The Greatest Love	
2015	Warm and Cozy	
2017	A Korean Odyssey	
2024	Red Swan	
