= The Greatest Love (South Korean TV series) =

2011 South Korean TV series

- Promotional poster for The Greatest Love
- Hangul: 최고의 사랑
- Hanja: 最高의 사랑
- Lit.: Best Love
- RR: Choegoui sarang
- MR: Ch'oegoŭi sarang
- Genre: Romance; Comedy
- Written by: Hong Mi-ran; Hong Jung-eun
- Directed by: Park Hong-kyun; Lee Dong-yoon
- Starring: Cha Seung-won; Gong Hyo-jin; Yoon Kye-sang; Yoo In-na
- Country of origin: South Korea
- Original language: Korean
- No. of episodes: 16

Production
- Producer: Kim Jin-man
- Running time: 60 minutes
- Production company: MBC

Original release
- Network: MBC TV
- Release: May 4 – June 23, 2011

The Greatest Love (Korean: 최고의 사랑; RR: Choegoui sarang) is a 2011 South Korean romantic comedy television series starring Cha Seung-won, Gong Hyo-jin, Yoon Kye-sang and Yoo In-na. Telling a story about true love in the fake world of entertainment, it aired on MBC from May 4 to June 23, 2011, on Wednesdays and Thursdays at 21:55 (KST) for 16 episodes.

== Synopsis ==
Gu Ae-jung (Gong Hyo-jin) was the most popular member of girl group Kukbo Sonyeo, literally meaning "National Treasure Girls," some 10 years ago, but fell from grace after becoming embroiled in scandals. She makes appearances on television programs to eke out a living for her troublemaker father and brother.

On the other hand, Dokko Jin (Cha Seung-won) is the most beloved star in the nation, topping all kinds of popularity polls and appearing in many commercials, but has several character flaws. Ae-jung discovers a secret about Jin by chance and reveals it on a talk show, incurring his fury. However, their ill-fated relationship unfolds in an unexpected way as Jin falls for Ae-jung and tries to win her heart.

Kang Se-ri (Yoo In-na) is the ex band-mate of Ae-jung. But whereas Ae-jung was more famous in her heyday and Se-ri was a nobody, now Se-ri is one of the most popular celebrities. She dated Dokko Jin for a short time, but despite their breakup, they continue to pretend that they're still dating to avoid negative publicity. Se-ri is also the host of popular TV dating show Couple Making Season 3.

Yoon Pil-joo (Yoon Kye-sang) is a well-mannered, thoughtful and a caring doctor of Oriental medicine. He has no interest in celebrities and their outrageous lives. Under pressure from his mother, he agrees to appear on a TV dating show, but after finding out that Ae-jung will also be appearing on the same show, he is eager to participate in the show and meet her. Fictional dating show Couple Making Season 3 is based on MBC's real variety program We Got Married, where they throw celebrities into fake relationships for the cameras. The concept is a competition-based mat-seon program, essentially setting up people on blind dates for the purposes of finding a marriage partner. The major difference is that in Couple Making, celebrity ladies compete over a non-celebrity eligible bachelor who gives them roses to prevent their elimination (a la The Bachelor), which is how Yoon Pil-joo ends up as a contestant on the show.

The mix of the main characters' mismatched personalities with the necessity to maintain (or recoup in Ae-jung's case) public sentiment makes for great hijinks and drama, not to mention an interesting meta social commentary on the entertainment industry and the star-making and -breaking power of image.

== Cast ==
=== Main ===
- Cha Seung-won as Dokko Jin
- Gong Hyo-jin as Gu Ae-jung
- Yoon Kye-sang as Yoon Pil-joo
- Yoo In-na as Kang Se-ri

=== Supporting ===
- Yang Han-yeol as Gu Hyung-kyu (Ae-jung's nephew)
- Jung Joon-ha as Gu Ae-hwan (Ae-jung's brother/manager)
- Lee Hee-jin as Jenny
- Im Ji-kyu as Kim Jae-seok (Jin's manager)
- Choi Hwa-jung as Representative Moon (president of Jin's agency)
- Bae Seul-ki as Han Mi-na
- Jung Man-sik as Manager Jang
- Choi Sung-min as Kim Eun-ho (Couple Making PD)
- Kim Mi-jin as Han Myung-jung (Couple Making writer)
- Park Won-sook as Pil-joo's mother
- Han Jin-hee as Gu Ja-chul (Ae-jung's father)
- Jeong Gyu-soo as Cardiac surgeon
- Ryu Hyo-young as Harumi
- In Gyo-jin (Note: Credited as Do Yi-sung.) as Mi-na's husband

=== Special appearances ===
Episode 1

- Jang Hang-jun
- Jung Doo-hong
- Horan
- Oh Sang-jin

Episodes 1–2 (Quiz to Change the World)

- Kim Gu-ra
- Lee Hwi-jae
- Park Mi-sun
- Jo Hye-ryun
- Lee Byung-jin
- Lee Kyung-shil
- Jo Hyung-gi
- Kim Ji-sun
- Ji Sang-ryeol
- Kim Hyun-chul
- Park Kyung-lim
- Kim Shin-young

Episodes 3–4

- Park Si-yeon

Episode 9

- Lee Seung-gi

Episode 10

- Brian Joo

Episode 14 (Section TV)

- Kim Yong-man
- Goo Eun-young
- Park Seul-gi
- Lee Sung-bae
- Seo Hyo-myung
- Hwang Je-sung
- Jung Hwan-gyu

Episode 15–16 (Ideal Type World Cup)

- Kim Gu-ra

== Production ==
The series was written by Hong Jung-eun and Hong Mi-ran, known collectively as the "Hong sisters", who also wrote other Korean dramas such as Sassy Girl Chun-hyang (2005), My Girl (2005), Couple or Trouble (2006), Hong Gil-dong (2008), You're Beautiful (2009) and My Girlfriend Is a Gumiho (2010). According to director Park Hong-kyun (who previously helmed Queen Seondeok), the Hong sisters' adeptness at character comedy is how The Greatest Love hoped to differentiate itself from other trendy dramas airing on Korean television in Spring 2011.

Though the drama draws from gossip people hear about celebrities, Cha Seung-won said during the drama's press conference that he also wanted to show a bright, healthy side of the entertainment scene in Korea. He admitted that entertainers do hide behind their image due to their job. "However, this drama will show they are just genuine people off-camera," Cha said. Yoon Kye-sang added that, "The script is very realistic, giving a fun sneak peek into what is going on behind the scenes." Cha has described his comedic acting as technical while his co-star Gong Hyo-jin's is more naturalistic and reactive. They believe they struck a good balance between their two acting styles, which benefited the drama greatly.

=== Filming ===
Several of the locations used in the drama are Cafe Monet in Pyeongchang-dong (ostensibly run by Gu Ae-jung's friend Jenny), Kim Jong Young Museum (which served as Dokko Jin's luxurious house), Lotte World Magic Island (setting of Dokko Jin's love confession), D Square Gallery in Nonhyeon-dong (as Dokko Jin's management agency), and Choonwondang Museum of Korean Medicine in Jongno District (as Yoon Pil-joo's clinic).

Product placement (PPL) were integrated into the characters' storylines, and the drama's popularity resulted in increased sales of products such as smartphones LG Optimus Black and Optimus Big, social networking service Me2day, and energy drink VitaminWater. But the production received a warning from the Broadcasting Commission for what it termed the drama's "egregious" use of PPL.

== Original soundtrack ==
The Greatest Love Original Sound Track

Soundtrack album by Various Artists
- Released: July 15, 2011
- Genres: Pop, K-pop, soundtrack, R&B
- Labels: The Grove Entertainment; LOEN Entertainment

| No. | Title | Artist | Length |
|---|---|---|---|
| 1. | "리얼러브송" (Real Love Song) | K.Will |
| 2. | "내 사람이라서" (Because You're My Man) | G.NA |
| 3. | "두근두근" (Pit-a-Pat) | Sunny Hill |
| 4. | "내 손을 잡아" (Hold My Hand) | IU |
| 5. | "나를 잊지 말아요" (Don't Forget Me) | Huh Gak |
| 6. | "눈물나게 사랑해" (Loving You Makes Me Cry) | Big Mama Soul |
| 7. | "아이캔't 드링크" (I Can't Drink) | Baek Ji-young |
| 8. | "LOVE LOVE" | Choi Su-jin |
| 9. | "Hero (Inst.)" | Various Artists |
| 10. | "Destiny (Inst.)" | Various Artists |
| 11. | "네잎클로버 (Inst.)" (Four-leaf Clover (Inst.)) | Various Artists |
| 12. | "Good Boy (Inst.)" | Various Artists |
| 13. | "사랑은 (Inst.)" (Love (Inst.)) | Various Artists |

== Ratings ==
The Greatest Love posted an average viewership rating of 16.6 percent on Total National Multimedia Statistics' (TNmS) chart and 19.5 percent on AGB Nielsen Media Research's (AGB) poll, with its final episode reaching 21 percent on AGB's survey to surpass the 20 percent mark for the first time. It topped the Wednesdays and Thursdays primetime TV chart for five consecutive weeks.

| Ep. | Broadcast date | Average audience share | | | |
| Ep. | Broadcast date | TNmS (%) | | AGB Nielsen (%) | |
| Ep. | Broadcast date | Nationwide | Seoul | Nationwide | Seoul |
|---|---|---|---|---|---|
| 1 | May 4, 2011 | 6.5% | 8.6% | 8.4% | 10.0% |
| 2 | May 5, 2011 | 7.1% | 9.6% | 9.7% | 11.5% |
| 3 | May 11, 2011 | 8.6% | 11.2% | 12.1% | 13.6% |
| 4 | May 12, 2011 | 9.7% | 12.3% | 13.9% | 17.1% |
| 5 | May 18, 2011 | 10.4% | 13.9% | 14.0% | 16.2% |
| 6 | May 19, 2011 | 10.2% | 12.7% | 15.1% | 17.5% |
| 7 | May 25, 2011 | 14.4% | 17.9% | 17.4% | 19.8% |
| 8 | May 26, 2011 | 15.2% | 18.0% | 17.9% | 20.2% |
| 9 | June 1, 2011 | 14.4% | 17.0% | 17.8% | 20.3% |
| 10 | June 2, 2011 | 13.8% | 17.4% | 18.4% | 21.2% |
| 11 | June 8, 2011 | 14.3% | 17.3% | 18.4% | 21.3% |
| 12 | June 9, 2011 | 14.6% | 18.5% | 18.4% | 20.9% |
| 13 | June 15, 2011 | 13.1% | 17.7% | 17.8% | 20.4% |
| 14 | June 16, 2011 | 14.5% | 18.1% | 17.9% | 20.1% |
| 15 | June 22, 2011 | 15.9% | 19.3% | 18.0% | 21.3% |
| 16 | June 23, 2011 | 17.4% | 21.2% | 21.0% | 23.7% |
| Average | | 12.5% | 15.7% | 16.0% | 18.4% |

== Awards and nominations ==
| Year | Award | Category | Recipient | Result |
|---|---|---|---|---|
| 2011 | 4th Korea Drama Awards | Best Drama | The Greatest Love | Nominated |
| 2011 | 4th Korea Drama Awards | Best Actor | Cha Seung-won | Nominated |
| 2011 | 4th Korea Drama Awards | Best Actress | Gong Hyo-jin | Nominated |
| 2011 | 4th Korea Drama Awards | Best Supporting Actress | Yoo In-na | Nominated |
| 2011 | 4th Korea Drama Awards | Best Writer(s) | Hong Mi-ran, Hong Jung-eun | Nominated |
| 2011 | 4th Korea Drama Awards | Best OST | "Don't Forget Me" by Huh Gak | Won |
| 2011 | 3rd MelOn Music Awards | Best OST | "Pit-a-Pat" by Sunny Hill | Won |
| 2011 | 13th Mnet Asian Music Awards | Best OST | "Don't Forget Me" by Huh Gak | Nominated |
| 2011 | 38th Korea Broadcasting Awards | Best Actor | Cha Seung-won | Won |
| 2011 | 24th Grimae Awards | Best Actor | Cha Seung-won | Won |
| 2011 | MBC Drama Awards | Drama of the Year | The Greatest Love | Won |
| 2011 | MBC Drama Awards | Top Excellence Award, Actor in a Miniseries | Cha Seung-won | Won |
| 2011 | MBC Drama Awards | Top Excellence Award, Actress in a Miniseries | Gong Hyo-jin | Won |
| 2011 | MBC Drama Awards | Best New Actor in a Miniseries | Yoon Kye-sang | Nominated |
| 2011 | MBC Drama Awards | Best New Actress in a Miniseries | Yoo In-na | Nominated |
| 2011 | MBC Drama Awards | Best Young Actor | Yang Han-yeol | Won |
| 2011 | MBC Drama Awards | Writer(s) of the Year | Hong Mi-ran, Hong Jung-eun | Won |
| 2011 | MBC Drama Awards | Popularity Award, Actor | Cha Seung-won | Nominated |
| 2011 | MBC Drama Awards | Popularity Award, Actress | Gong Hyo-jin | Won |
| 2011 | MBC Drama Awards | Best Couple Award | Cha Seung-won and Gong Hyo-jin | Won |
| 2012 | 8th New York Television Festival's; International TV & Films Awards | Silver Prize, Miniseries category | The Greatest Love | Won |
| 2012 | 48th Baeksang Arts Awards | Best Drama | The Greatest Love | Nominated |
| 2012 | 48th Baeksang Arts Awards | Best Actor (TV) | Cha Seung-won | Nominated |
| 2012 | 48th Baeksang Arts Awards | Best Actress (TV) | Gong Hyo-jin | Won |
| 2012 | 48th Baeksang Arts Awards | Best Screenplay (TV) | Hong Mi-ran, Hong Jung-eun | Nominated |
| 2012 | 7th Seoul International Drama Awards | Outstanding Korean Drama | The Greatest Love | Nominated |

== Comic adaptation ==
Comic book publisher Tooni Plus released the first two books of The Greatest Love in April 2012. The firm expects to boost Korean comic books' sales abroad with drama-based comic books.
