= Jeong You Jeong =

South Korean writer (born 1966)

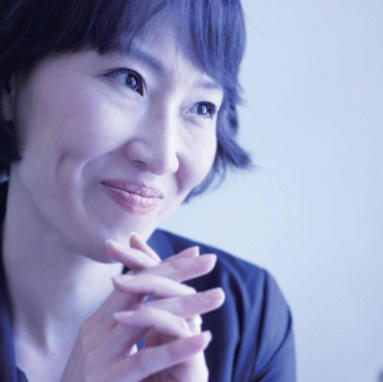
- Born: Jeong You Jeong; August 15, 1966 (age 60)
- Occupation: Writer
- Writing career
- Genre: Fiction

Jeong You Jeong (Korean: 정유정; born August 15, 1966) is a South Korean writer. Her books include Shoot Me in the Heart (내 심장을 쏴라), a book about youths wanting to escape a mental hospital in search for freedom; Chilnyeonui bam (7년의 밤 Seven Years of Night), a book about the story of a father who was forced to become a murderer, and a boy who grows up as the son of the murderer; 28, a book about the end of the world brought about by a waterborne epidemic; and The Good Son, a book that documents the inner side of a psychopathic killer.

== Biography ==
Jeong was born 1966 in Hampyeong County, South Jeolla Province. A Catholic, she graduated from Christian Nursing College in Gwangju. She later worked as a nurse for five years and at the Health Insurance Review & Assessment Service for nine years. Her work experience formed the basis for building her realistic narratives and story structures for her novels, Shoot Me in the Heart (내 심장을 쏴라), and Chilnyeonui bam (7년의 밤 Seven Years of Darkness).

Jeong had dreamed of becoming a writer as a child, but could not pursue it due to her mother's disapproval. Her uncle was a playwright who had died due to poverty in his early 40s, and her mother feared her daughter would meet a similar fate. Jeong is also known for her persistence in becoming a writer. She was rejected by 11 competitions in six years, and pledged to never write again if she was rejected again. She submitted Nae insaeng-ui spring camp (내 인생의 스프링캠프 My Life's Spring Camp) to the Segye Youth Literature Competition and won at age 41.

Her novel Shoot Me in the Heart (내 심장을 쏴라) alludes to her youth. While working as an intensive care nurse in her 20s, her mother died and forced Jeong to be the family breadwinner. She has said she endured that period of her life by holding on to the hope of arriving in a warm and sunny place once her difficulty had passed. In the book, Seungmin's dream of freedom and imagining Annapurna was also the author's wish. After writing her novel 28, she went to Annapurna, and based on this experience she published the book Jeong You Jeong’s Himalaya Hwansangbanghwang (정유정의 히말라야 환상방황 Jeong You Jeong's Fantastic Wandering in the Himalayas).

Two of Jeong's novels have been made into films due to their intense narratives. Shoot Me in the Heart (내 심장을 쏴라) was made into a film released in 2015 by director Mun Che-yong and starring Yeo Jin-goo and Lee Min-ki. Seven Years of Night (7년의 밤) was produced with Choo Chang-min as director and starring Jang Dong-gun and Ryu Seung-ryong. Her recent work The Good Son (종의 기원) has also been optioned by a film studio and is expected to be produced into a film.

== Writing ==
Jeong's debut in the 2010s shocked the Korean literary circle. This was because compared to fellow Korean writers that had debuted through new writer's contests or literary journals, who write works by laying out human psychology over real sentiments on life, Jeong You Jeong had actively drawn genre specific subjects into the narrative in creating a story.

In Shoot Me in the Heart (내 심장을 쏴라), Jeong You Jeong satirizes the whole Korean society through the setting of a mental hospital, and tells the story of two young men attempting to escape. Shoot me in the Heart (내 심장을 쏴라), which was selected as the winner of the ‘Segye Literature Award’, was supported by younger judges, but was not favorably praised by older judges. Because of this, it's been said that there were two secret voting sessions. Literary critic Kim Hwayoung and writer Hwang Sok-yong, the judges at the time, had said that the work had a weakness in that the story was “hard to get through in the beginning,’ but also that it “makes one have sincere doubts through the metaphor of how life goes round in circles despite constantly dreaming and attempting escape”.

Jeong's major work Seven Years of Night (7년의 밤) is structured into separate narratives of a story seven years ago, when the tragic MV Seryeong incident happened, and another in present-day in which a man wandering through life and marked as a murderer's son receives news of his father's execution. The son attempts to solve the incident's mysteries. As the author says she is a fan of Hemingway, Charles Dickens and Stephen King, she uses meticulous descriptions and a narrative that stimulates tension. Writer Park Bum Shin has highly praised Jeong You Jeong as having "opened a new horizon for novels through literary sincerity, dynamic narratives, and daring appeals to the reader," and that she is a monster of Korean Literature, an "Amazon."

28 is about the end of the world brought about by a waterborne epidemic, while The Good Son (종의 기원) deals with the origin of evil within people.

== Works ==
=== Young adult novels ===
- Nae insaeng-ui spring camp (내 인생의 스프링캠프 My Life's Spring Camp), Biryongso, 2007, ISBN 9788949120768

=== Novels ===
- Shoot Me in the Heart (내 심장을 쏴라), Eunhaengnamu, 2009, ISBN 9788956602998.
- Chilnyeonui bam (7년의 밤 Seven Years of Darkness), Eunhaengnamu, 2011.
- 28, Eunhaengnamu, 2013, ISBN 9788956607030.
- Jong-ui Giwon (종의 기원 The Origin of Species) (The Good Son in English), Eunhaengnamu, 2016, ISBN 9788956609959.

=== Essay collection ===
- Jeong You Jeong's Himalaya Hwansangbanghwang (정유정의 히말라야 환상방황 Jeong You Jeong's Fantastic Wandering in the Himalayas), Eunhaengnamu, 2014, ISBN 9788956607726.

=== Translated works ===
- The Good Son (English)
- O Bom Filho (Portuguese)
- Les nuits de sept ans (French)
- Sieben Jahre Nacht (German)
- 28天 (Chinese)
- 7 năm bóng tối (Vietnamese)
- Семилетняя ночь (Russian)
- Хороший сын или Происхождение видов (Russian) & others

== Awards ==
- 2007 1st Segye Youth Literature Competition for Nae insaeng-ui spring camp (내 인생의 스프링캠프 My Life's Spring Camp)
- 2009 5th Segye Literature Prize for Shoot Me in the Heart (내 심장을 쏴라)

== Film adaptations ==
- Seven Years of Night (2018), directed by Choo Chang-min
- Shoot Me in the Heart (2015)
