= Yoon-ah =

- Hangul: 윤아
- RR: Yuna
- MR: Yuna

Yoon-ah (Korean: 윤아) is a Korean given name. As of 2026, the name ranked 6,566th out of 36,179 male names and 33rd out of 28,726 female names. A total of 14,182 people, consisting of 14,173 females and 9 males, were born with the name from 2008 to 2026.

Notable people with the name include:

- Song Yoon-ah (송윤아), South Korean actress
- Lim Yoona (임윤아), South Korean singer and actress
- Oh Yoon-ah (오윤아), South Korean actress and former racing model
- Kim Yuna (김윤아), South Korean singer and songwriter
- Roh Yunah (노윤아), South Korean singer and member of South Korean girl group Illit

== See also ==
- List of Korean given names
