= Jeon Bae-soo =

South Korean actor (born 1970)

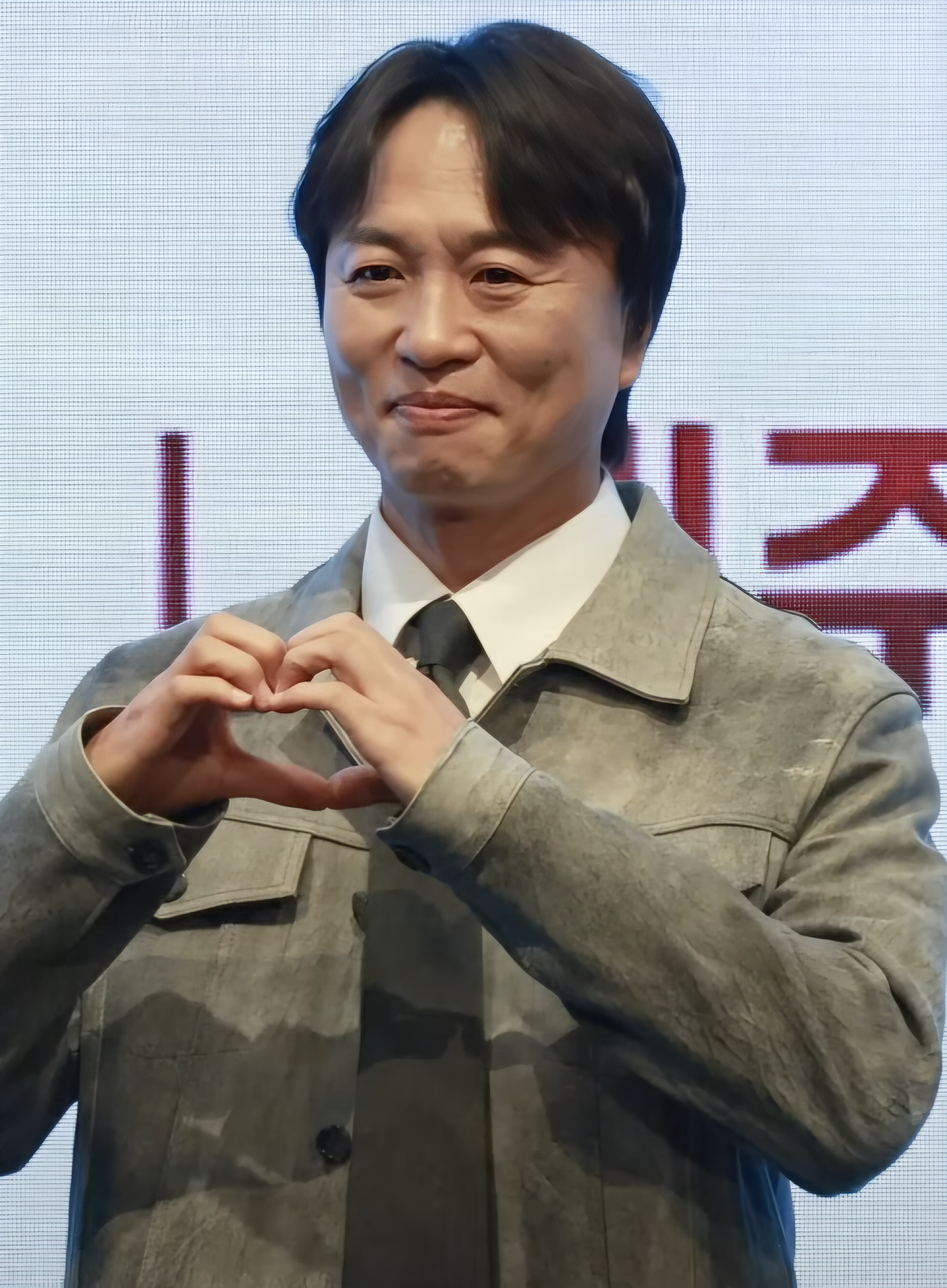
- Jeon in November 2024
- Born: June 2, 1970 (age 56); Imsil-gun, North Jeolla Province, South Korea
- Occupation: Actor
- Years active: 2004–present
- Agent: Noon Company

Korean name
- Hangul: 전배수
- Hanja: 全培秀
- RR: Jeon Baesu
- MR: Chŏn Paesu

Jeon Bae-soo (Korean: 전배수; born June 2, 1970) is a South Korean actor. He is known for his supporting roles in various TV series and films. His better known works are: 2016 TV series The K2, 2019 romantic comedy When the Camellia Blooms, 2020 historical romantic comedy Mr. Queen, Netflix horror web series All of Us Are Dead and the 2024 hit romantic comedy series Queen of Tears. He has appeared in more than 50 TV series, theatrical plays and films including 2022 political drama film Kingmaker. In 2022, he appeared in TV series Tracer and Forecasting Love and Weather.

== Career ==
Jeon Bae-soo debuted as an actor in films in 2004, taking small roles. His major breakthrough was in 2016 with roles in the TV series The K2 and Becky's Back. After that in 2017 he appeared in both seasons of Stranger, Fight for My Way, Witch at Court Mad Dog, and Revolutionary Love. In 2020 he was cast in historical romantic comedy Mr. Queen.

In 2022 Jeon was seen in action thriller TV series Tracer, Netflix original series All of Us Are Dead, JTBC's work place romance Forecasting Love and Weather, KBS's sports drama Love All Play and legal drama Extraordinary Attorney Woo alongside Park Eun-bin. In 2022, he also played role of director Lee's assistant in political drama film Kingmaker.

In January 2023, Jeon signed with Noon Company.

== Filmography ==
=== Films ===
Year	Title	Role	Notes	Ref.
2006	Lost in Love			
2008	Crossing	Coal miner		
2008	Modern Boy	Real estate research group colleague		
2009	Handphone	Song Ki-taek		
2010	Heartbeat	Section chief Park		
2011	Late Blossom	Public officer of small neighborhood office		
2012	Masquerade	Hyung-pan		
2012	The Tower	Young-chul		
2014	The Language of Love	PD		
2014	No Tears for the Dead	Detective Jang		
2014	The Pirates	Baek Seon-gi		
2015	Gangnam Blues	Chairman Gu		
2015	The Himalayas	Jeon Bae-soo		
2016	A Violent Prosecutor	Subsection chief Kang		
2016	The Wailing	Deok-gi		
2016	Detour	Byeong-cheol		
2016	The Age of Shadows	Seodaemun prison officer		
2017	The Prison	Chief of security officer		
2017	The Battleship Island	Ma		
2017	Man of Will	Park Dong-goo		
2018	Seven Years of Night	Hyeon-tae		
2018	On Your Wedding Day	Seung-hee's father		
2018	Default	Yeong-beom		
2019	The Odd Family: Zombie on Sale	Constable Park	Cameo	
2019	The Gangster, the Cop, the Devil	Chief detective	Cameo	
2020	#ALIVE	Mask man		
2022	Kingmaker	Lee's assistant		
2022	Confidential Assignment 2: International	Kim Jung-taek	Cameo	
2024	Land of Happiness	Bu Han-myeong		
2025	Ghost Train		Releasing July 9	

=== Television series ===
Year	Title	Role	Notes	Ref.
2014	Golden Cross			
2016	Becky's Back	Teacher		
2016	The K2	Joo Chul-ho		
2017–20	Stranger	Choi Yoon-soo	Season 1–2	
2017	Fight for My Way	Choi Cheon-gap, Ae-ra's father		
2017	KBS Drama Special – "Let Us Meet"	Cha Min-gwan	Season 8	
2017	Witch at Court	Oh Soo-cheol		
2017	Mad Dog	Sin Ji-woong		
2017	Revolutionary Love	Baek Joon's father		
2017	Drama Stage – "The Picnic Day"		Season 1	
2017	A Midsummer's Memory	Kim Ji-woon's boss	Cameo	
2018	Lawless Lawyer	Giseong Court judge		
2018	Still 17	Woo Sung-hyun		
2018	Lovely Horribly	Eul-soon's father		
2018	The Ghost Detective	Jeon Deok-joong		
2018	The Guest	Kim Yeong-soo		
2019	My Lawyer, Mr. Jo 2: Crime and Punishment	Kang Ki-yeong		
2019	Haechi	Jang Dal		
2019	When the Camellia Blooms	Manager Byeon Bae-soo		
2019	KBS Drama Special – "Wreck Car"	Car mechanic	Season 10	
2020	Welcome	Go Min-joong		
2020	The King: Eternal Monarch	Jeong Do-in		
2020	Hush	Kim Hyeon-do		
2020	Mr. Queen	Kim Mun-geun		
2022	Tracer	Jang Jeong-il		
2022	Forecasting Love and Weather	Lee Myung-han		
2022	Love All Play	Park Man-soo		
2022	Extraordinary Attorney Woo	Woo Gwang-ho		
2023	Strangers Again	Seo Han-gil		
2023	Divorce Attorney Shin	Park Yu-seok		
2024	Queen of Tears	Baek Du-gwan		
2024	Dear Hyeri	Kim Shin		
2025	Undercover High School	An Seok-ho		
2025	When Life Gives You Tangerines	Song Yeon-sam	Cameo (episode 9,10)	
2026	We Are All Trying Here	Park Young-soo		
2026	Happy Anding	Kang Min-gi		

=== Web series ===
Year	Title	Role	Notes	Ref.
2022	All of Us Are Dead	Nam So-ju	Season 1	
2022	Glitch	Hong Jong-sik		
2023	Daily Dose of Sunshine	Yoon Man-cheon		
2024	Queen Woo	Woo-so		
2025	The Murky Stream	Kang Haeng-soo	Disney+	

=== Theater ===
Year	Title	Native title	Role	Ref.
2007	Liar 3	라이어 3탄	Lee Young-ho	
2008	Forever - Daegu International Musical Festival	포에버 - 대구국제뮤지컬페스티벌	Multi roles	
2008	Play Yeoljeon 2 - The Story of the Neulgeun Thief	연극열전2 - 늘근도둑 이야기	Sleazy thief	
2019	All Faces of Eggs - Gimhae	달걀의 모든 얼굴 - 김해	Governor Jang	

== Awards and nominations ==
Year	Award	Category	Nominated work	Result	Ref.
2019	KBS Drama Awards	Best Supporting Actor	When the Camellia Blooms and Drama Special – Wreck Car	Nominated	
