= Attack the Gas Station 2 =

2010 South Korean crime comedy film

- Promotional poster for Attack the Gas Station 2
- Hangul: 주유소 습격 사건 2
- Hanja: 注油所 襲擊事件 2
- RR: Juyuso seupgyeok sageon 2
- MR: Chuyuso sŭpkyŏk sakŏn 2
- Directed by: Kim Sang-jin
- Written by: Baek Sang-yeol
- Produced by: Kang Woo-suk
- Starring: Ji Hyun-woo; Jo Han-sun; Park Yeong-gyu
- Cinematography: Kim Dong-cheon
- Edited by: Ko Im-pyo
- Music by: Sohn Moo-hyun
- Production company: Cinema Service
- Distributed by: CJ Entertainment
- Release date: January 21, 2010
- Running time: 107 minutes
- Country: South Korea
- Language: Korean
- Box office: US$5 million

Attack the Gas Station 2 (Korean: 주유소 습격 사건 2) is a 2010 South Korean action comedy film directed by Kim Sang-jin, starring Ji Hyun-woo and Jo Han-sun. It is the sequel to Attack the Gas Station (1999), and was released on 21 January 2010.

== Plot ==
It's been 10 years since Mr. Park's gas station was attacked by motorcycle gangs. To get his revenge, Park hires a quartet of dodgy boys: a lethal puncher, a footballer with a killer high kick, a potbellied wrestler, and a video game addict who mastered the art of bluffing. But these employees turn out to be more dangerous when they demand their overdue salaries. With a smile of conversion, they wait for the biker raiders to attack, but the bikers don't come, and a gang of high school students riding scooters attack the gas station, and the case goes in an unexpected direction.

== Cast ==
- Ji Hyun-woo as One Punch
- Jo Han-sun as High Kick
- Moon Won-joo as Body-twist
- Jung Jae-hoon as Yaburi
- Baek Jeong-min as Jjangdol
- Park Yeong-gyu as gas station owner
- Park Sang-myun as Mang-chi
- Lee Hyeon-ji as Myeong-rang, female student
- Kwon Yong-woon as narrator manager
- Tak Teu-in as Beol-goo
- Lee Mi-do as Lee Mi-do
- Na Hae-ri as Na Hae-ri
- Lee Se-mi as Lee Se-mi
- Jo Deok-hyun as Jo-jung Daily reporter
- Ko In-beom as revival owner
- Kim Do-yeon as Girl in memories
- Lee Myeong-ho as Pal-bong
- Kim Yoon-sung as motorcycle gang leader
- Hwang Sang-kyung as motorcycle gang member 1
- Kim Jung-woon as motorcycle gang member 2
- Kim Seung-wan as prison officer
- Park Ji-yeon as woman thinking about the past 2
- Kim Do-yeon as woman thinking about the past 3
- Park Jin-young as One Punch's father
- Kim Dae-ho as chicken restaurant owner
- Jang Hang-jun as director
- Lee Mi-so as female student getting statutory rape
- Kim Sang-jin as soccer team coach
- Kim Soo-ro as Ha Re-yi (cameo)
- Kim Sun-a as herself (cameo)
