= Face (2004 film) =

- Face film poster
- Hangul: 페이스
- RR: Peiseu
- MR: P'eisŭ
- Directed by: Yoo Sang-gon
- Written by: Kim Hie-jae; Park Cheol-hie; Park Seong-min; Yoo Sang-gon
- Produced by: Tae Weon-jang
- Starring: Song Yoon-ah; Shin Hyun-joon; Kim Seung-wook
- Cinematography: Choi Ji-yeol
- Edited by: Park Gok-ji
- Music by: Lee Han-na
- Release date: June 11, 2004
- Running time: 92 minutes
- Country: South Korea
- Language: Korean

Face (Korean: 페이스) is a 2004 Korean horror film directed by Yoo Sang-gon.

== Plot ==
Lee Hyun-min, who works reconstructing faces from skulls, quits his work in an institute to stay with his Beta-allergic daughter Jin that was submitted to a transplant of heart by the specialist Dr. Yoon. The newcomer researcher to the institute, Jung Sun-young, comes to his house with the skull of a victim of a serial-killer that had her whole body melted down with acid. At first, Hyun-min refuses the assignment, but he is haunted by the ghost of the victim, and scared, he decides to reconstruct the face of the woman. When Jin has trouble with the transplanted heart, Hyun-min requests the donor case history to Dr. Yoon, but the doctor refuses to give the information, claiming confidentiality issues. Dr. Yoon becomes the prime suspect of Detective Suh, who is in charge of the investigation of the murder cases, and he discloses the identity of the victim based on the reconstructed face. Meanwhile, Hyun-min has a premonition and finds another skull buried a long time ago below the sand in a field. He reconstructs the face, unraveling a supernatural secret.

== Cast ==
- Song Yoon-ah as Jung Sun-young
- Shin Hyun-joon as Lee Hyun-min
- Kim Seung-wook as Detective Seo
- Ahn Suk-hwan as Ph.D. Yoon
- Jo Won-hee as Kim Han-soo
- Song Jae-ho as Department head Song
- Han Ye-rin as Lee-jin
- Jang Suk-won as Dong-chul
- Hong Soo-ah as Jo Hye-ran
- Oh Jung-se as Min-ho
- Shin Cheol-jin as Police officer Son
- Lee Joo-shil as Hyun-min's mother
- Kwak Min-seok as doctor 1
- Lee Cheol-min as Detective Jo

== See also ==
- List of Korean-language films
