= Song Yoon-ah =

South Korean actress (born 1973)

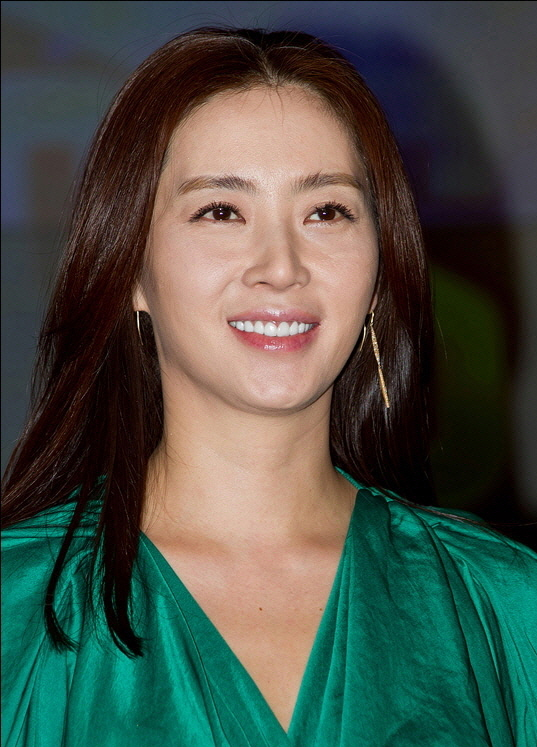
- Song in March 2011
- Born: June 7, 1973 (age 53); Seoul, South Korea
- Education: Hanyang University (Cultural anthropology)
- Occupation: Actress
- Years active: 1995–present
- Agent: Snowball Entertainment
- Spouse: Sul Kyung-gu (m. 2009)
- Children: 1

Korean name
- Hangul: 송윤아
- Hanja: 宋玧妸
- RR: Song Yuna
- MR: Song Yuna
- Website: Official Website

Song Yoon-ah (Korean: 송윤아, born June 7, 1973) is a South Korean actress. She is best known for starring in the film Jail Breakers (2002), as well as the television dramas Hotelier (2001), On Air (2008), Mama (2014), The K2 (2016), and Show Window: The Queen's House (2021–2022).

== Early life and education ==
Song Yoon-ah was born in Seoul, but spent her childhood in Gimcheon, North Gyeongsang Province. She has two elder brothers, the first one is a doctor.

While studying cultural anthropology as a freshman at Hanyang University, she was recommended by an older schoolmate to a modeling agency. Song made her entertainment debut when she won three awards at the KBS Super Talent Contest in 1995, and began appearing in magazine advertisements and as an extra on TV shows.

== Career ==
In 1998, Song rose to fame as the antagonist in Mister Q, playing the head of the design department in an underwear company who bullies the heroine; the trendy drama was a big hit, with a peak viewership rating of 45.3%. Over the next few years, Song became well known for her roles in TV dramas such as Paper Crane (1998), The Boss (1999), and Hotelier (2001).

Her first few films did not make a significant impression at the box office. But in late 2002, Song starred in one of the bigger commercial hits of the year, Jail Breakers with actors Sul Kyung-gu and Cha Seung-won. Her energetic performance in Kim Sang-jin's comedy was recognized with Best Supporting Actress trophies from the Blue Dragon Film Awards, the Chunsa Film Art Awards, and the Grand Bell Awards. Song next played an anthropologist from the National Institute of Scientific Investigation in the 2004 horror film Face.

In 2006, she reunited onscreen with Sol Kyung-gu in Lost in Love, a low-key melodrama directed by Choo Chang-min about two college friends who drift apart and reconnect over the course of ten years. Arang followed, in which Song played a detective on the trail of a serial killer; this was her first time to get top billing over a male costar (rookie actor Lee Dong-wook). But like Face, her previous project in the horror genre, Arang was a commercial and critical failure. Song returned to television with My Beloved Sister, in the title role of a graduate art student who grew up wealthy but must suddenly take on the responsibilities as head of the family and take care of her younger brothers after their father goes bankrupt then disappears.

Her next hit drama came in 2008 with On Air, a behind-the-scenes look at the Korean entertainment industry. Song was cast in the role of scribe Kim Eun-sook's alter ego, a successful, acerbic screenwriter who clashes egos with a top actress (played by Kim Ha-neul) while falling for a TV director (played by Park Yong-ha). Then in the 2009 thriller Secret, Song played the wife of a homicide detective—she becomes the prime suspect in a brutal murder he's investigating, while in the 2010 tearjerker Wedding Dress, her character is a widowed designer who is diagnosed with cancer and begins sewing the ultimate parting gift, a special dress for her young daughter's wedding, which she will never get to see.

After getting married in 2009 and giving birth in 2010, Song went on a five-year hiatus from acting. She became an adjunct professor and part-time lecturer at Seoul Arts College in 2010, as a faculty member of the Department of Performing Arts and the Department of Broadcasting, Entertainment and Visual Arts. Apart from occasional stints as an awards ceremony host (she hosted the Korean Film Awards from 2003 to 2010), in 2011 she also joined the cooking show Food Essay on cable channel Olive, and served as a judge on the first season of talent-reality show Korea's Got Talent.

Song made her acting comeback in the 2014 drama series Mama, which revolved around a terminally ill single mother's quest to find a loving family for her son before her impending death, leading to her befriending the current wife of a former lover. Her performance won Best Television Actress at the 51st Baeksang Arts Awards.

In 2016, Song played a villain in action drama The K2.

In 2017, she returned to the big screen and acted as a war correspondent in VR film Nine Days. The film is planned to exhibit in Sundance Film Festival, Cannes Film Festival and Venice Film Festival. The same year, she was cast in the film Stone, her first feature film in 7 years. And the film has invited to the 23rd Busan International Film Festival.

In 2018, Song was cast in SBS mystery family drama Secret Mother.

Song then starred in JTBC's 2020 pre-produced 19+ age-restricted series Graceful Friends.

Song was cast in Channel A's series for the first time with melodrama mystery Show Window: The Queen's House.

In 2023, Song reunited with Director Park Hye-ryeong for web show Song Yoon-ah by PDC.

== Other activities ==
=== Philanthropy ===
Song and her husband Sul Kyung-gu are known for their philanthropic efforts. In July 2010, they covered the entire surgical expenses for a child with congenital heart disease and personally visited her at Seoul St. Mary's Hospital. They later donated ₩100 million through the Korean Committee for UNICEF to assist victims of the sinking of MV Sewol in April 2014. Sul expressed deep sympathy for the tragedy, stating, "I felt indescribable pain witnessing the Sewol ferry disaster. I sincerely wish for recovery." More recently, on February 13, 2023, the couple contributed another ₩50 million to Korea's UNICEF Committee to support children affected by the 2023 Turkey–Syria earthquakes.

== Personal life ==
Song and actor Sul Kyung-gu got married on May 28, 2009, in a Catholic church in Bangbae-dong, followed by a reception at The Ritz-Carlton Hotel Company in Seoul. Both are graduates of Hanyang University and have acted together in Jail Breakers (2002) and Lost in Love (2006). Their son, Sul Seung-yoon, was born on August 3, 2010.

In 2014, Song filed a defamation suit against 57 netizens who spread online rumors her alleged extramarital affair with Sul in 2002 while he was still married to his first wife, leading to their divorce in 2006. Sul and Song have denied these rumors, stating that their relationship began in 2007.

== Filmography ==
=== Film ===
Year	Title	Role	Notes
1997	1818 (Profanity)	Hong Se-in	
1998	Zzang (The Best)	Song Na-young	
2000	A Masterpiece in My Life	Kang Yeo-kyung	
2002	Jail Breakers	Hahn Kyung-soon	
2004	Face	Jung Sun-young	
2006	Lost in Love	Yeon-soo	
2006	Arang	So-young	
2009	Secret	Yoo Ji-yeon	
2010	Wedding Dress	Seo Go-eun	
2018	Nine Days	Kim Sun-joo / Park Seung-hee	Short film
2019	Innocent Witness	Kim Soo-in	Cameo
2019	Stone Skipping	Teacher Kim	

=== Television series ===
Year	Title	Role	Notes
1995	Age of Individuality		
1995	Brilliant People		
1996	Tears of the Dragon	Ms. Jung, Yi Suk-beon's wife	
1997	Drama City: "The Road to Gorangpo"		
1997	Hometown of Legends: "The Nine-Tailed Fox"		
1997	Beyond the Horizon		
1998	Love	Lee Hee-soo	
1998	Mister Q	Hwang Joo-ri	
1998	Cool Special: "The Eye of Terror"	Jung-in	
1998	Paper Crane	Cha Yeon-hee	
1998	Advocate	Jang Hye-mi	
1999	The Boss	Han Yeon-ji	
1999	You Don't Know My Feelings	Na Sook-ja	
1999	Love Story: "Lost Baggage"	Jung-in	
2000	Bad Friends	Ha Young-seo	
2001	Hotelier	Seo Jin-young	
2001	Sweet Bear	Han Jung-eun	
2002	The Present	Kim Hye-jin	
2004	Into the Storm	Cha Mi-seon	
2005	Hong Kong Express	Han Jung-yeon	
2006	My Beloved Sister	Yoon Seung-joo	
2008	On Air	Seo Young-eun	
2010	Secret Garden	Top star at giveaway event	Cameo (episode 2)
2014	Mama	Han Seung-hee	
2015	Assembly	Choi In-kyung	
2016	The K2	Choi Yoo-Jin	
2016	KBS Drama Special: "Sweet Home"	Dr.Song	Cameo
2018	Secret Mother	Kim Yoon-jin	
2018	Room No. 9	Park Hyun-jung	Cameo
2020	Graceful Friends	Nam Jung-hae	
2021	Show Window: The Queen's House	Han Sun-joo	
2023	Delivery Man	Mo Chae-Ryung	Cameo (episode 12)

=== Television shows ===
Year	Title	Role	Notes
1998	Go! Our Heaven	Host	
1999	Super TV Sunday Is Fun - Song Yoon-ah's Summer Escape	Host	
2011	Food Essay	Host	
2011	Korea's Got Talent	Judge	Season 1
2011	The Miracle of Kangaroo Mother Care	Narrator	Documentary
2012	Spring Hasn't Come Yet: One Year After the Earthquake in Japan	Narrator	Documentary
2014	Hope TV SBS	Host	

=== Web shows ===
Year	Title	Role	Ref.
2023	Song Yoon-ah by PDC	Host	

=== Hosting ===
Year	Title	Notes	Ref.
1998	Puchon International Fantastic Film Festival - Big Concert Musical Journey	with Kim Byun-chan	
1999	Korean Video and Records Awards	with Shin Dong-ho	
2000	36th Baeksang Arts Awards	with Shin Dong-ho	
2000	SBS Drama Awards	with Yoo Jung-hyun	
2002	Golden Disk Awards	with Shin Dong-ho	
2002	SBS Drama Awards	with Yoo Jung-hyun	
2003	2nd Korean Film Awards	with Ahn Sung-ki	
2003	SBS Drama Awards	with Yoo Jung-hyun	
2004	3rd Korean Film Awards	with Ahn Sung-ki	
2005	4th Korean Film Awards	with Ahn Sung-ki	
2006	5th Korean Film Awards	with Ahn Sung-ki	
2007	6th Korean Film Awards		
2008	7th Korean Film Awards		
2010	8th Korean Film Awards		

== Discography ==
=== Soundtrack appearances ===
Year	Song title	Notes
2002	"Pink Lipstick"	Jail Breakers OST
2008	"Shadow"	On Air OST

== Awards and nominations ==
Year	Award	Category	Nominated work	Result
1995	KBS Super Talent Contest	Gold Award	—N/a	Won
1995	KBS Super Talent Contest	Photogenic Award	—N/a	Won
1995	KBS Super Talent Contest	Julia Award	—N/a	Won
1998	SBS Drama Awards	Excellence Award, Actress	Mister Q	Won
1998	KBS Drama Awards	Popularity Award, Actress	Paper Crane	Won
1999	35th Baeksang Arts Awards	Most Popular Actress (TV)	Mister Q	Won
1999	MBC Drama Awards	Excellence Award, Actress	The Boss	Won
2000	SBS Drama Awards	Big Star Award	Love Story "Lost Baggage"	Won
2000	45th Information and Communication Day	Prime Minister's Commendation	—N/a	Won
2001	MBC Drama Awards	Top Excellence Award, Actress	Hotelier, Sweet Bear	Won
2002	Korea Best Dressed Swan Awards	Recipient	—N/a	Won
2002	23rd Blue Dragon Film Awards	Best Supporting Actress	Jail Breakers	Won
2003	11th Chunsa Film Art Awards	Best Supporting Actress	Jail Breakers	Won
2003	40th Grand Bell Awards	Best Supporting Actress	Jail Breakers	Won
2004	SBS Drama Awards	Excellence Award, Actress in a Special Planning Drama	Into the Storm	Won
2004	SBS Drama Awards	Top 10 Stars	Into the Storm	Won
2006	4th Korea Fashion World Awards	Best Dressed, Movie Actress category	—N/a	Won
2006	MBC Drama Awards	Excellence Award, Actress	My Beloved Sister	Nominated
2007	3rd Andre Kim Best Star Awards	Best Star Award	—N/a	Won
2007	MBC Entertainment Awards	Achievement Award		Won
2008	Cosmopolitan	Fun Fearless Female	—N/a	Won
2008	SBS Drama Awards	Grand Prize (Daesang)	On Air	Nominated
2008	SBS Drama Awards	Top Excellence Award, Actress	On Air	Won
2008	SBS Drama Awards	Top 10 Stars	On Air	Won
2009	4th Andre Kim Best Star Awards	Female Star Award	—N/a	Won
2010	2nd Korea Jewelry Awards	Diamond Award	—N/a	Won
2014	3rd APAN Star Awards	Top Excellence Award, Actress in a Miniseries	Mama	Nominated
2014	27th Grimae Awards	Best Actress	Mama	Won
2014	MBC Drama Awards	Grand Prize (Daesang)	Mama	Nominated
2014	MBC Drama Awards	Top Excellence Award, Actress in a Special Project Drama	Mama	Won
2015	51st Baeksang Arts Awards	Best Actress (TV)	Mama	Won
2015	KBS Drama Awards	Excellence Awards, Actress in a Mid-length Drama	Assembly	Nominated
2018	SBS Drama Awards	Top Excellence Award, Actress in a Daily and Weekend Drama	Secret Mother	Won
