= The Cut (2007 film) =

- Theatrical poster
- Hangul: 해부학교실
- Hanja: 解剖學敎室
- RR: Haebuhak gyosil
- MR: Haebuhak kyosil
- Directed by: Son Tae-woong
- Written by: Jeon Soon-wook
- Produced by: Choi Yong-bae; Kim Yeong-ho; Lee Jin-sook; Go Hyeong-uk
- Starring: Han Ji-min
- Cinematography: Seong Seung-taek
- Edited by: Hahm Sung-won; Lee Sang-min
- Music by: Lee Sang-yun
- Distributed by: Chungeorahm; M&FC
- Release date: 11 July 2007
- Running time: 107 minutes
- Country: South Korea
- Language: Korean
- Box office: $3,898,774

The Cut (Korean: 해부학교실; lit. 'Anatomy classroom'), also known as Cadaver, is 2007 South Korean film.

== Plot ==
Seon-hwa is a new student at an elite medical school, and she is initiated into a dissection class headed by Dr. Han along with five other students, including her boyfriend Ki-beom. After the first class the students all start to share the same nightmare involving a one-eyed surgeon, and one by one they start to be murdered, the victims being discovered with their hearts removed. Seon-hwa and Ki-beom are convinced that these events are related to a beautiful cadaver with a rose tattoo on her breast, and they begin an investigation to uncover her identity.

== Cast ==
- Han Ji-min as Seon-hwa
- On Joo-wan as Joong-suk
- Oh Tae-kyung as Ki-beom
- Jo Min-ki as Dr. Han
- Moon Won-joo as Kyung-min
- Soy Kim
- Chae Yun-seo
- Jin Yu-young
- Park Chan-hwan (cameo)
- Jung Chan (cameo)
- Xiyeon as young Seonhwa

== Release ==
The Cut was released in South Korea on 11 July 2007, and on its opening weekend was ranked third at the box office with 264,765 admissions. The film went on to receive a total of 622,400 admissions nationwide, with a gross (as of 5 August 2007) of $3,898,774.
