= Moon Won-joo =

South Korean actor

- Born: 14 February 1980 (age 46); Seoul, South Korea
- Other names: Song Yool-kyu, Moon Won-jun, Mun Won-jun, Mun Won-joo
- Education: Chung-Ang University (BA in Theater Studies)
- Occupation: Actor
- Years active: 2003–present
- Agent: Winsome Entertainment
- Known for: Hot Stove League; Nokdu Flower; Golden Apple

Moon Won-joo is a South Korean actor. He is best known for his roles in dramas such as Hot Stove League, Nokdu Flower and Golden Apple. He also appeared in movies My Girl and I, The Cut and Attack the Gas Station 2.

== Filmography ==
=== Television series ===
Year	Title	Role	Ref.
2005	Golden Apple	Hwang Soon-shik	
2006	The Invisible Man	Won-ju	
2007	Flowers For My Life	Manager	
2008	Elephant	Jang-woo	
2008	Strongest Chil Woo	Villager	
2015	Great Stories	Kim-il	
2015	The Flatterer	Kang Tae-san	
2017	The King in Love	Senior guard Shik	
2019	Nokdu Flower	Kim Dang-son	
2019	Hot Stove League	Kim Gi-bum	
2021	Crime Puzzle	Han Moon-ho	
2022	Tracer	Ko Dong-won	
2022	Tracer	Ko Dong-won	
2022	The First Responders	Kwak	
2023	Brain Works	O Sang-gi	

=== Film ===
Year	Title	Role	Language
2005	She's on Duty	Sung-jin	Korean
2005	My Girl and I	Young-goo	Korean
2005	You Are My Sunshine	Mr. Gook	Korean
2006	Dasepo Naughty Girls	Gangster	Korean
2007	Three Kims	Tattoo man	Korean
2007	The Cut	Kyung-min	Korean
2008	The Sense of Perfect Taste	Chef	Korean
2008	What Happened Last Night?	Young-ho	Korean
2008	Modern Boy	Detective	Korean
2008	Do Re Mi Fa So La Ti Do	Deok-pal	Korean
2010	Attack the Gas Station 2	Potbelly wrestler	Korean
2010	The Servant	Mal-ho	Korean
2011	Fighting Spirit	Neurimbo	Korean
2012	The Ugly Duckling	Monk	Korean
2013	The Hero	Bong-soo	Korean
2013	Secretly, Greatly	Choi Wan-woo	Korean
2014	Campus S Couple	Seung-gyu	Korean
2021	A Trap	Doctor Ma	Korean
2023	Unforgivable	Won-ju	Korean
2024	Again 1997	Bong-gyun	Korean
