= Park Hye-ryeong =

South Korean filmmaker (born 1974)

- 박혜령
- Born: 1974 (age 51–52); Seoul, South Korea
- Occupations: Television Director; Filmmaker
- Years active: 2002 to present
- Employers: Hublist (1999–2002); Leespro (2002–2008); Hayanso Entertainment (2008 to present)
- Organization: Korea Broadcasting Video Producers Association
- Spouse: no
- Children: 0

Korean name
- Hangul: 박혜령
- Hanja: 朴惠領
- RR: Bak Hyeryeong
- MR: Pak Hyeryŏng

Park Hye-ryeong (Korean: 박혜령; born in Seoul, 1974) is a South Korean documentary film director, producer and entertainment executive. She currently serves as the CEO of Hayanso Entertainment, a company she established in 2008.

Park Hye-ryeong has produced over 40 documentaries on terrestrial broadcasting for 18 years. Her notable works include collaborations with culinary researcher Lim Ji-ho on projects such as "Human Theater" (KBS 2006), "Wandering Gourmet" (SBS 2008, 2009, 2012, 2013), and "How to Eat Well and Live Well" (SBS 2014–2016), as well as the feature-length documentary film "The Wandering Chef" (2020).

== Career ==
=== Television documentary director ===
Park Hye-ryeong started her directing career at Hubnet. She directed "VJ Commando" and the pilot program "Youth" for KBS2. Later, she was recruited by CEO Lee Dong-seok to work as a director at his production company called Leespro, which provided outsourced production services for KBS2. At Leespro, she served as one of the directors for the popular KBS show called "KBS Field Report Zone 3," and later for "Human Theater." It was during the filming of an episode titled "Breaking the Chef's Poison" for "Human Theater" that Park first met culinary researcher Lim Ji-ho.

After Leespro closed down in 2008, Park decided to become an independent. Instead of working for another company, she desired the freedom to produce her own work. In that same year, she established Hayanso Entertainment. The name was given to her by her acquaintance, Pianist Lim Dong-chang, and it signifies living with sincerity and integrity, like a white cow.

Hayanso Entertainment's debut project was "SBS Special - Wandering Gourmet." The show features culinary researcher Lim Ji-ho, embarking on another culinary journey across the country in search of the finest ingredients. In 2008, Park proposed the idea to SBS. Initially, it was planned as a two-part series. However, due to the positive response received after the first episode, it was extended into a full series consisting of a total of 7 episodes, with 2 to 3 episodes airing each year. The first SBS special Wandering Gourmet premiered in spring 2009, and achieved a viewership rating of 9.1% (TNS Media Korea). The second episode aired in August of the same year takes place in Jeju, followed by the third episode in Baekdu Mountain. The journey continues to Kyoto in subsequent episodes.

Park, along with Min In-sik, the CP (Chief Producer) of SBS's Culture Bureau, created SBS's "How to Eat Well and Live Well." They were joined by Kwon Hyeon-jeong, the writer of "Human Theater." Kim Hye-soo and Lee Hwi-jae hosted the program as a Lunar New Year special pilot in February 2012. It became a regular program in 2014, as a replacement of "How to Eat Well and Live Well as a Star," and was hosted by culinary researcher Lim Ji-ho and comedian Lee Young-ja. The show aired on Sunday morning and offers a unique concept, featuring top actors such as Kim Hye-soo, Hwang Jung-min, Lee Sun-kyun, and Song Yoon-ah embarking on a healing trip.

The filming process for the show lasts for two days and one night, but the overall production takes two weeks. After the meeting, the team visits the chosen travel destination in advance to make preparations. If the items for the trip are different from what they expected, they don't change the destination but make adjustments to the available choices. Once filming is complete, the process of reviewing the footage, adding subtitles, and incorporating music begins. Around 35 to 40 people are involved in the production, and the busy process continues without a break every week. The show's 75-minute broadcast is successful because it provides a sense of "healing" to viewers. Park acknowledges that the process can be tiring and challenging, but the cast members, including Lim Ji-ho, find solace by spending time with the production team and enjoying food on set. The support and gratitude from viewers also serve as a source of strength for the team. Park emphasizes that the main driving force behind the production is the hope that the show brings joy to its audience.

Park received critical acclaim for her work and was awarded the Excellence Prize at the 8th Korea Independent PD Awards ceremony, organized by the Korea Independent PD Association. The ceremony was held in Yeouido, Seoul.

"Kim Hye-soo's Refugee Diary" was a documentary that aired on KBS1 in September 2017. Directed by Park Hye-ryeong, Jang Hyun-ho, and Lee Byung-han, with the script written by Kwon Hyeon-jeong. The documentary followed Kim Hye-soo's visits to refugees who had survived near-death experiences in the Mediterranean. During her travels in June 2017 to Serbia, Italy, and Greece, which were major refugee destinations, she witnessed the challenges faced by refugees. Despite restrictions, the number of refugees, especially children, continued to rise. Kim Hye-soo shared vivid stories of their journeys and expressed admiration for their resilience, particularly among children living alone without family or guardians.

=== Film documentary director ===
In early 2009, Lim Ji-ho ventured to Jiri Mountain to cook persimmons for Kim Soon-gyu, a grandmother from Jirisan Dancheon Village, whom Lim Ji-ho considered to be the third mother he shared his heart with. Park Hye-ryeong, who had been documenting his life for three years, joined him on this journey. Initially, Park had no intention of making a film, but she was captivated by Lim's unique personality and continued to film his daily life even outside their television program. Over the course of about 10 years, Park accumulated footage, and during that time, she learned about a personal revelation regarding Lim's mothers: the one who gave birth to him, the adopted one, and the one he met in the mountain, Kim Soon-gyu. This revelation sparked the director's interest in exploring the chef's hidden loneliness, leading her to make a movie based on his story.

Kim Soon-gyu's motion sickness prevented her from leaving the neighborhood, making it difficult for her to travel by car. Lim wanted to prepare a special 90th birthday meal for Kim Soon-gyu, sourcing ingredients from all over the country. However, unexpected news was delivered: Kim Soon-gyu had died. Devastated after visiting the house in person, Chef Lim told Park a few days later that he wanted to cook a dinner for the three mothers. He performed his own ritual, cooking 108 plates of ancestral rite food over three days, to express his longing for his three mothers.

In 2016, Park submitted her debut feature-length documentary titled "108 Plates" to compete in the 'Incheon Documentary Report 2016'. The documentary was among 47 projects vying for recognition in the 'Korean Documentary Pitching (K-Pitch)' category, which specifically focuses on Korean documentary projects intended for theatrical release and television broadcast. "108 Plates" was selected as one of the prominent works in the competition.

The documentary "108 Plates" underwent a name change and was rebranded as "Bapjeong" (Korean: 밥정; Hanja: 情; lit. 'The Meal') with its English title being "The Wandering Chef." The duration of "The Wandering Chef" is 87 minutes. The film follows the journey of culinary researcher Lim Ji-ho, a wandering chef who cooks dishes using everything from nature. It also captures chef Lim Ji-ho's personal history, cooking life, and philosophy through his table setting. On March 19, 2019, it was reported that "The Wandering Chef" premiered worldwide as part of the World Showcase program at the Hot Docs Canadian International Documentary Festival, which is recognized as one of the world's top three documentary film festivals. The festival took place from April 25 to May 5.

After its initial premiere, "The Wandering Chef" was featured at the 66th Sydney Film Festival, which took place in Sydney, Australia, from June 5 to June 16, 2019. The film had scheduled screenings on June 15, Saturday, at Event Cinemas George St 9, at 4:30 pm, and on June 16, Sunday, at the same venue, at 6:30 pm.

The U.S. premiere of "The Wandering Chef" took place at the Margaret Mead Film Festival, held at the American Museum of Natural History, New York, on October 20, 2019, in collaboration with The Korea Society.

Following these screenings, "The Wandering Chef" was invited to several other film festivals including the Galway Film Fleadh, San Sebastian International Film Festival, DMZ International Documentary Film Festival, Warsaw International Film Festival, Haifa International Film Festival, Devour! The Food Film Fest, Oslo Films from the South, Hawaii International Film Festival, Minsk International Film Festival in Belarus, Rastapad film festival, Santa Barbara International Film Festival, and the Colorado Dragon Boat Film Festival.

Originally scheduled for release in spring 2020 in South Korea, "The Wandering Chef" had to be postponed due to COVID-19. The press screening of the film took place at At Nine in Dongjak District, Seoul on September 28. The film was chosen as the opening film for the 6th Seoul International Food Film Festival, a six-day event held from October 6 to October 11, 2020. The film had its premiere on October 7, 2020. In November, the film was also screened at The 2nd Agricultural Film Festival. The festival took place at the Wanju-gun Media Center in Jeollabuk-do on November 27 and 28, 2020.

In 2021, "The Wandering Chef" was screened at the food culture film screening Korea-ASEAN Gourmet Dinner, hosted by The ASEAN Cultural Center. This screening provided a glimpse into Korean and ASEAN food culture and was scheduled every weekend from January to February 2021. A total of 10 films from Korea, ASEAN, and other Asian countries were presented under four themes: 'Hororok', 'Chop Chop', 'Omul Omul', and 'Korea-ASEAN Table'.

In 2023, Park reunited with Song Yoon-ah, with whom she had previously worked on SBS's "How to Eat Well and Live Well." They collaborated to create a web talk show called "Song Yoon-ah" on the YouTube channel by PDC.

=== Other activity ===
In 2017, Park on behalf of Hayanso Entertainment, joined the Special Emergency Countermeasures Committee for the Elimination of Unfair Broadcasting Practices. This committee operates under the Korea Broadcasting Video Producers Association and was established on August 4, with the participation of 209 outsourced production companies primarily involved in producing current affairs and culture programs. The Special Countermeasures Committee identified issues within the outsourcing production industry and specifically mentioned Directors Park Hwan-seong and Kim Gwang-il, who died on September 14 while working on an EBS program.

== Filmography ==
=== Film ===
Film credit
Year	Title		Director	Company	Distributor	Ref.
Year	English	Korean	Director	Company	Distributor	Ref.
2006	The Wandering Chef	밥정	Park Hye-ryeong	Hayanso Entertainment Co., Ltd.	At9 Film Co., Ltd.	

=== Television show ===
Film credit
Year	Title		Broadcaster	Production house	Credited as		Ref.
Year	English	Korean	Broadcaster	Production house	Co-director	Director	Ref.
2000	VJ Commando	VJ 특공대	KBS	Hubnet	Yes	NA	
2002	Youth	청춘	KBS	Hubnet	Yes	NA	
2002	KBS On-site Report Zone 3	KBS 현장르포 제3지대	KBS	Leespro	Yes	NA	
2002	Wednesday Planning	수요기획	KBS	Leespro	Yes	NA	
2006	Human Theater	인간극장	KBS	Leespro	Yes	NA	
2013	KBS Documentary Empathy: By itself	KBS다큐공감: 절로절로 저절로	KBS	Hayanso Entertainment Co., Ltd	Yes	NA	
2013	SBS Special - Wandering Gourmet	SBS 스페셜-방랑 식객	SBS	Hayanso Entertainment Co., Ltd	NA	Yes	
2014–2016	How to Eat and Live Well	잘 먹고 잘 사는 법, 식사하셨어요?	SBS	Hayanso Entertainment Co., Ltd	NA	Yes	
2017	KBS Documentary Empathy "Kim Hye-soo's Refugee Diary"	KBS다큐공감: 김혜수의 난민일기	KBS1	Hayanso Entertainment Co., Ltd	Yes (Note: with Jang Hyun-ho and Lee Byung-han)		

=== Web series ===
Web series credit
Year	Title		Director	OTT	Company	Ref.
Year	English	Korean	Director	OTT	Company	Ref.
2023	Song Yoon-ah by PDC	송윤아 by PDC	Park Hye-ryeong	by PDC	Hayanso Entertainment Co., Ltd.	
2023–2024	Way Back Home by PDC	퇴근길 by PDC	Park Hye-ryeong	by PDC	Hayanso Entertainment Co., Ltd.	

== Accolades ==
Award and nomination
Award	Year	Category	Recipient	Result	Ref.
8th Korea Independent PD Awards	2012	Excellence Award	How to Eat and Live Well	Won	
