= Jail Breakers =

- Theatrical release poster
- Hangul: 광복절 특사
- Hanja: 光復節特赦
- RR: Gwangbokjeol teuksa
- MR: Kwangbokchŏl t'ŭksa
- Directed by: Kim Sang-jin
- Written by: Park Jung-woo
- Produced by: Kang Woo-suk
- Starring: Sul Kyung-gu; Cha Seung-won; Song Yoon-ah
- Cinematography: Jeong Kwang-seok
- Edited by: Ko Im-pyo
- Music by: Sohn Moo-hyun
- Production company: Director's Home Pictures
- Distributed by: Cinema Service
- Release date: November 21, 2002
- Running time: 120 minutes
- Country: South Korea
- Language: Korean
- Box office: US$17.8 million

Jail Breakers (Korean: 광복절 특사; RR: Gwangbokjeol teuksa) is a 2002 South Korean comedy film directed by Kim Sang-jin, and starring Sul Kyung-gu, Cha Seung-won, and Song Yoon-ah. It was a box office hit with a total of 3,073,919 admissions nationwide, making it the 4th highest grossing Korean film of 2002.

== Plot ==
Two long-term prisoners manage to break out of jail by tunneling underneath the prison wall with a spoon. Upon returning to society, they read in the newspaper that they are scheduled to be pardoned under a special amnesty on the very next day. The desperate warden agrees to pretend nothing happened if they can break back into prison unnoticed.

== Cast ==
- Sul Kyung-gu as Yoo Jae-pil
- Cha Seung-won as Choi Moo-seok
- Song Yoon-ah as Hahn Kyung-soon
- Kang Sung-jin as Yong Moon-sin
- Kang Shin-il as Prison warden
- Yoo Hae-jin as Police officer
- Lee Hee-do as Director
- Park Jeong-hak as FM
- Jang Tae-sung as Cheol-gu
- Kim Young-woong as Head of academic affairs

== Awards and nominations ==
Year	Award	Category	Recipients	Result	Ref.
2002	23rd Blue Dragon Film Awards	Best Supporting Actress	Song Yoon-ah	Won	
2002	23rd Blue Dragon Film Awards	Best Screenplay	Park Jung-woo	Won	
2003	39th Baeksang Arts Awards	Best Actor	Cha Seung-won	Won	
2003	40th Grand Bell Awards	Best Supporting Actress	Song Yoon-ah	Won	
2003	40th Grand Bell Awards	Best Cinematography	Jeong Kwang-seok	Won	
2003	11th Chunsa Film Art Awards	Best Supporting Actress	Song Yoon-ah	Won	

== See also ==
- Vaisakhi List, a 2016 Indian remake
