= Yeong-ja's Heydays =

1975 South Korean film directed by Kim Ho-sun

- Film poster
- Hangul: 영자의 전성시대
- RR: Yeongjaui jeonseongsidae
- MR: Yŏngjaŭi chŏnsŏngsidae
- Directed by: Kim Ho-sun
- Written by: Jo Seon-jak
- Produced by: Kim Tai-soo
- Starring: Yeom Bok-sun; Song Jae-ho
- Cinematography: Jang Seok-jun
- Edited by: Yoo Jae-won
- Music by: Jeong Sung-jo
- Production company: Tae Chang Enterprises
- Release date: February 11, 1975
- Running time: 103 minutes
- Country: South Korea
- Language: Korean

Yeong-ja's Heydays (Korean: 영자의 전성시대) is a 1975 South Korean romantic drama film directed by Kim Ho-sun. It became a huge box office hit upon its release; it drew an audience of 360,000, surpassing the top foreign film at the time, The Sting, by 30,000.

== Production ==
The film is based on a bestseller novel written by Cho seonjak(趙善作(조선작)) in the 1970s. The crank in for the film was announced in October 12, 1974 in The Dong-a Ilbo.

== Plot ==
After returning from the Vietnam War, Chang-su (Song Jae-ho), who works as a scrubber at a public bath, runs into Yeong-ja (Yeom Bok-sun) in a police station. Three years previously, Chang-su was a laborer at an iron foundry. He met Yeong-ja at his boss's house, where she worked as a housemaid. He fell in love with the innocent and kindhearted Yeong-ja, and proposed to her before leaving for Vietnam. However, while he was gone, Yeong-ja was sexually assaulted by the boss's scoundrel son, and then kicked out of the house.

Wishing to live an upstanding life, she got a job at a garment factory, but her paltry wages were not enough to make ends meet. She even tried working in a bar at a friend's recommendation, but the work did not suit her. Yeong-ja became a conductor on a bus, only to lose one of her arms in a traffic accident with no other means to support herself she becomes a prostitute.

Reuniting with her for the first time in three years, Chang-su is shocked to discover that she is living an armless life with no hope or prospects. He pours all his care into saving her, including making her an artificial arm, but she leaves him for the sake of his future.

Several more years pass. Chang-su discovers Yeong-ja's whereabouts and goes to her house. When he sees that she is living a happy life with her husband (Lee Soon-jae), who also has a disability, and their child, he wishes her happiness and departs.

== Cast ==
- Yeom Bok-sun as Yeong-ja
- Song Jae-ho as Chang-su
- Choi Bool-am
- Lee Soon-jae as Yeong-ja's husband
- Do Kum-bong
