= Song Jae-ho =

South Korean actor (1937–2020)

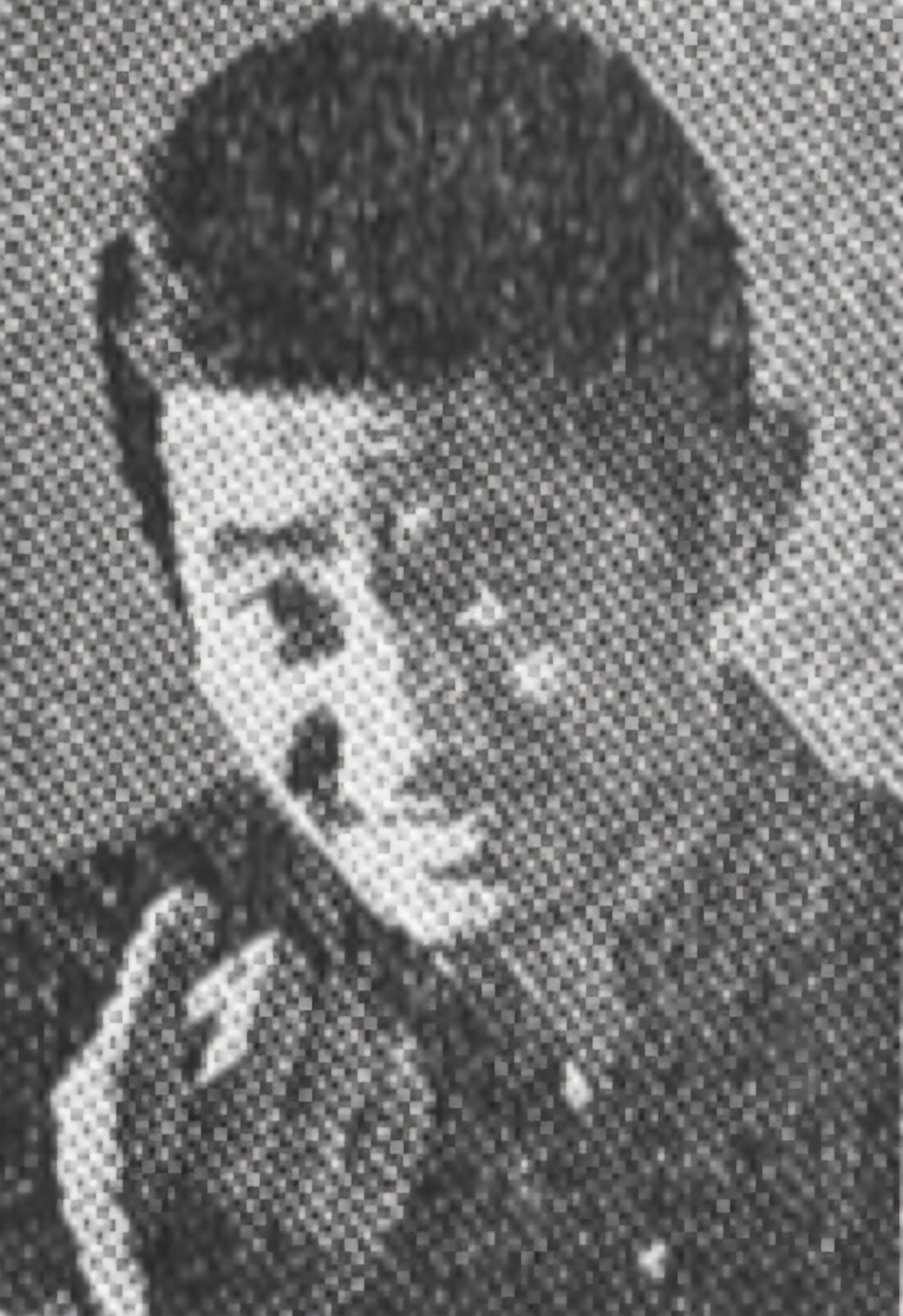
- Song in 1975 Kyunghyang Shinmun
- Born: Song Jae-eon; March 10, 1937; Heijō, Heian'nan-dō, Korea, Empire of Japan (now Pyongyang, North Korea)
- Died: November 7, 2020 (aged 83)
- Education: Dong-a University - Korean Language and Literature
- Occupation: Actor
- Years active: 1959–2020

Korean name
- Hangul: 송재언
- Hanja: 宋在彥
- RR: Song Jaeeon
- MR: Song Chaeŏn

Stage name
- Hangul: 송재호
- Hanja: 宋在浩
- RR: Song Jaeho
- MR: Song Chaeho

Song Jae-ho (born Song Jae-eon; 10 March 1937 – 7 November 2020) was a South Korean actor.

== Career ==
He made his acting debut in 1959, and became best known for his work in 1970s and 1980s South Korean cinema, notably Yeong-ja's Heydays (1975). Song has since become one of the most respected veteran actors in South Korean film and television, with more recent starring roles in the films Memories of Murder (2003), The President's Last Bang (2005) and Late Blossom (2011), as well as the television drama Precious Family (2004).

== Filmography ==
=== Film ===
- The Way (2017)
- Northern Limit Line (2015) (cameo)
- The Suspect (2013)
- Marriage Blue (2013)
- The Spy: Undercover Operation (2013)
- The Tower (2012)
- Sunday Punch (2011)
- Quick (2011)
- Late Blossom (2011)
- Troubleshooter (2010)
- Tidal Wave (2009)
- Private Eye (2009)
- A Tale of Legendary Libido (2008)
- BA:BO (2008)
- May 18 (2007)
- Over the Border (2006)
- The President's Last Bang (2005)
- Face (2004)
- Sweet Sixties (2004)
- Too Beautiful to Lie (2004)
- Silver Knife (2003)
- Singles (2003)
- Memories of Murder (2003)
- Double Agent (2003)
- The Beauty in Dream (2002)
- Musa (2001)
- Ivan the Mercenary (1997)
- Tip (1988)
- The Chameleon's Poem (1988)
- Love Song (1984)
- The Winter That Year Was Warm (1984)
- With Hope for Future Baseball King (1982)
- Night of a Sorceress (1982)
- Ardent Love (1982)
- People of Kkobang Neighborhood (1982)
- The Glorious Days of Young-ja (Sequel) (1982)
- Three Times Each for Short and Long Ways (1981)
- The Hidden Hero (1980)
- The Terms of Love (1979)
- Arirang Ah! (1978)
- Winter Woman (1977)
- A Driver with a Nickname (1977)
- Season of Love (1977)
- Girls From Scratch (1976)
- Why Do You Ask My Past? (1976)
- Kan-Nan (1976)
- Counting Stars in a Night Sky (1976)
- Young City (1976)
- Cuckoo's Dolls (1976)
- You Can Borrow My Love (1976)
- Chang-su's Heydays (1975)
- Wood and Swamp (1975)
- Story of the Youth (1975)
- Lee Jung-seob, a Painter (1975)
- Yeong-ja's Heydays (1975)
- 25 O'clock of Youth (1973)
- Wedding Dress in Tears (1973)
- Looking for Sons and Daughters (1972)
- Cruel History of Myeongdong (1972)
- The Golden Harbor in Horror (1971)
- King Sejo the Great (1970)
- The Lost Wedding Veil (1970)
- Love and Death (1970)
- Evil Person (1969)
- The Starting Point (1967)
- A Spotted Man (1967)
- Legend of Ssarigol (1967)
- Heukmaek (1965)
- The Bacheolor Pub (1964)

=== Television drama ===
- Local Hero (OCN, 2016)
- Missing You (MBC, 2012)
- The Chaser (SBS, 2012)
- Can't Lose (MBC, 2011) (guest appearance, ep 1-4)
- Miss Ripley (MBC, 2011)
- Sign (SBS, 2011)
- I Believe in Love (KBS2, 2011)
- Thank You for Your Smile (KBS2, 2010)
- The Fugitive: Plan B (KBS2, 2010)
- Hot Blood (KBS2, 2009)
- Partner (KBS2, 2009)
- My Husband's Woman (SBS, 2007)
- Que Sera, Sera (MBC, 2007)
- Crazy for You (SBS, 2007)
- The Invisible Man (KBS2, 2006)
- Which Star Are You From? (MBC, 2006)
- Love Is Over (MBC, 2006)
- Shin Don (MBC, 2005)
- Precious Family (KBS2, 2004)
- Freezing Point (MBC, 2004)
- Sweet Buns (MBC, 2004)
- My Hidden Love (MBC, 2004)
- War of the Roses (MBC, 2004)
- Sunlight Pours Down (SBS, 2004)
- Breathless (MBC, 2003)
- The Fairy and the Swindler (SBS, 2003)
- While You Were Dreaming (MBC, 2003)
- Jang Hee-bin (KBS2, 2002)
- Since We Met (MBC, 2002)
- Whenever the Heart Beats (KBS2, 2002)
- Mom's Song (SBS, 2002)
- Present (MBC, 2002)
- The Merchant (MBC, 2002)
- Piano (SBS, 2001)
- Empress Myeongseong (KBS2, 2001)
- Tender Hearts (KBS1, 2001)
- Pardon (SBS, 2000)
- Air Force (MBC, 2000)
- Wrath of an Angel (SBS, 2000)
- Medical Center (SBS, 2000)
- The Full Sun (KBS2, 2000)
- Youth (MBC, 1999)
- Invitation (KBS2, 1999)
- Roses and Bean Sprouts (MBC, 1999)
- KAIST (SBS, 1999)
- The King and the Queen (KBS1, 1998)
- Seoul Tango (SBS, 1998)
- To the End of the World (MBC, 1998)
- The Mountain (MBC, 1997)
- Beautiful My Lady (SBS, 1997)
- The Most Beautiful Goodbye in the World (MBC, 1996)
- Tears of the Dragon (KBS1, 1996)
- Their Embrace (MBC, 1996)
- Project (KBS2, 1996)
- Thaw (SBS, 1995)
- Asphalt Man (SBS, 1995)
- Kka Chi (SBS, 1994)
- Tomorrow Love (KBS2, 1993)
- Autumn Woman (SBS, 1992)
- 92 Whale Hunting (KBS2, 1992)
- And Shaky Times (KBS2, 1991)
- In Search of a Nest (KBS1, 1991)
- What the Women Live (MBC, 1990)
- Punggaek (KBS2, 1988)
- The Tree of Love (KBS2, 1987)
- Southern Cross (KBS1, 1986)
- Family (KBS2, 1984)
- KBS TV Novel: "Tale of Chunhyang" (KBS2, 1984)
- Seagull Maiden (KBS1, 1983)
- Foundation of the Kingdom (KBS1, 1983)
- Ordinary People (KBS1, 1982)
- The New Bride (KBS)
- Eye (KBS2, 1981)
- People on the Cliff (KBS, 1980)
- Junwoo (KBS, 1975)
- 113 Investigation Headquarters (MBC, 1973)

== Accolades ==
=== Award ===
- 1982 18th Baeksang Arts Awards: Best TV Actor (The New Bride)

=== State honor ===
Name of country, year given, and name of honor
Country	Year	Honor	Ref.
South Korea (Note: Honors are given at the Korean Popular Culture and Arts Awards, arranged by the Korea Creative Content Agency and hosted by the Ministry of Culture, Sports and Tourism. They are awarded to those who have contributed to the arts and South Korea's pop culture.)	2021	Order of Cultural Merit	
