= Life Is Cool =

- Theatrical poster
- Directed by: Choi Equan; Choe Seung-won
- Written by: Choi Equan
- Produced by: Lee Tae-hun
- Starring: Kim Soo-ro; Kang Sung-jin; Kim Jin-soo; Park Ye-jin
- Cinematography: Sin Gyeong-won; Jeong Yeong-sam; Choe Byeong-hun
- Edited by: Wang Sang-ik
- Music by: Jang Min-seung; Jeong Jae-il
- Distributed by: CJ Entertainment
- Release date: 12 June 2008
- Running time: 98 minutes
- Country: South Korea
- Language: Korean
- Box office: US$28,100

Life Is Cool (Korean: 그녀는 예뻤다; rr: Geunyeoneun Yeppeotda; lit. "She Was Beautiful") is a 2008 South Korean romance animated film, and is the first rotoscoped film from South Korea. This film's visual style was influenced from Richard Linklater's two films, Waking Life (2001) and A Scanner Darkly (2006).

== Plot ==
Three tricenarian best friends — a heart-broken Romeo, a hopeless romantic, and a goofy playboy — meet for the first time in ten years. However, things get complicated when they all fall for the same woman.

== Cast ==
- Kim Soo-ro as Baek Il-kwon
- Kang Sung-jin as Kim Tae-yeong
- Kim Jin-soo as Seong-hoon
- Park Ye-jin as Kang Yeon-woo
- Kim Roi-ha as Basketball manager
- Lee Won as Samsung scouter
- David Joseph Anselmo as Foreign professor
- Goo Bon-im as Barbershop woman
- Kim Choon-gi as University adulterer
- Kim Joo-hyun as High school girl
- Yoon Joo-hee as Joo-hee
- Jo Young-gyu as Policeman
- Park Jin-taek as Naked man
- Park Yoo-mil as Pregnant woman
- Lee Sang-hong as Tango gangster

== Production ==
Life Is Cool was one of four films produced by CJ Entertainment to receive investment from Keyeast, a media contents company co-established by actor Bae Yong-joon. Although actual shooting only lasted for one month, it then took almost two years and 140 artists to complete the rotoscoping, a technique in which animators traced over live action footage frame by frame. Visual effects were created by local production company DNA, who had previously worked on The Animatrix.

Director Choi Equan has said that he was inspired by the Richard Linklater's film Waking Life, and that the film's plot was based on a real-life story of one of his friends.

== Release ==
Life Is Cool was released in South Korea on 12 June 2008. The film accumulated a total of 3,951 admissions at the domestic box office, and grossed US$28,100.
