= Park Yeong-gyu =

South Korean actor

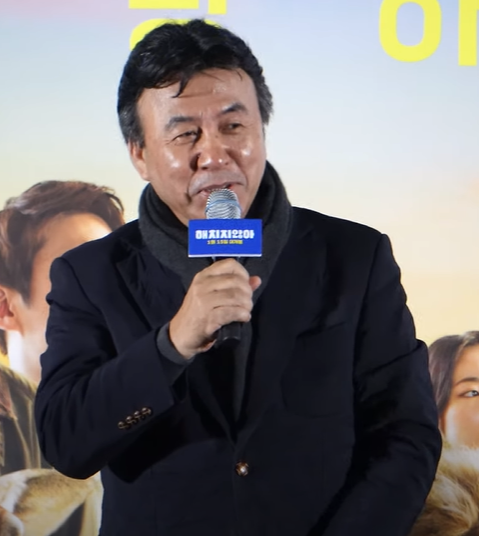
- Park in 2020
- Born: 28 October 1953 (age 72); Daejeon, South Korea
- Other name: Park Young-gyu
- Education: Seoul Institute of the Arts - Theater
- Occupation: Actor
- Years active: 1985–present
- Agent: Crebig Entertainment
- Spouse(s): Unknown (m. 2019) Kim Su-ryun (m. 2004; div. 2019) Choi Kyung-sook (m. 1997; div. 2001) Unknown (m. 1983; div. 1996)
- Children: Park Dal (1983–2004)

Korean name
- Hangul: 박영규
- Hanja: 朴榮奎
- RR: Bak Yeonggyu
- MR: Pak Yŏnggyu
- Website: crebig-ent.com

Park Yeong-gyu (born 28 October 1953) is a South Korean actor. He is best known for his roles in Attack the Gas Station, in which he plays the owner of the titular gas station, and Break Out, in which he plays a corrupt politician.

== Filmography ==
=== Film ===
Year	Title	Role
1985	College Story	
1985	The Parting	
1987	Lethe's Love Song	
1988	Tip	Jang-ho
1988	Love's Scribble	Gil-soo
1989	Rainbow over Seoul	President Pyo
1989	Ae-ran	Yoshimura
1989	Gigolo in Shinsa-dong	Gigolo Dosa
1989	Flesh Trade	
1991	Tomorrow's Rain	
1992	The Emperor of Romance	Master Noh
1995	No Emergency Exit	Rock cafe employee
1999	Attack the Gas Station	Gas station owner
2001	The Humanist	Father
2002	A.F.R.I.K.A.	Gas station owner
2002	Break Out	Park Yeong-gab
2003	Season in the Sun	Monk Woo-nam
2003	Oh! Brothers	President Park (cameo)
2003	Happy Ero Christmas	Bang Seok-doo
2004	Dance with Solitude	Bae Jung-beom
2004	Ghost House	Man crawling out of TV set (cameo)
2004	Flower Shop (short film)	
2010	Attack the Gas Station 2	Gas station owner
2012	I Am the King	King Taejong
2013	How to Use Guys with Secret Tips	Dr. Swarski
2013	Happiness for Sale	Lee Jae-geun
2014	The Royal Tailor	Ssangdungi yangban (cameo)
2020	Secret Zoo	Director Seo
2022	Stella	Grandpa
2022	Life Is Beautiful	Jin-bong's father

=== Television series ===
Year	Title	Role
1985	MBC Bestseller Theater: "Green Hat"	
1987	Beautiful Affair	
1988	Forget Tomorrow	Bae Dong-joon
1989	We Don't Know Either	Hyun Jin-gyu
1989	Your Toast	Kim Min-bong
1990	Dark Sky, Dark Bird	Choi Joong-ki
1991	The Woman Sets the Dining Table	Kim Sung-chul
1992	The Chemistry is Right	
1992	Ambitions on Sand	
1993	Stormy Season	Joo Sung-hyuk
1994	People's Land	
1995	KBS TV Novel: " Road"	Hwang Jong-gu
1995	Bold Men	Yeong-gyu
1995	KBS Drama Game: "Birth of a Villainess"	Professor Hwang
1995	Choi Seung-hee	
1995	Journey	
1996	Women of the Road	Jeon Dong-woo
1997	Ambition	President Ma
1997	Only You	Yoon-ki
1997	Beautiful Crime	Kim Jin-seob
1997	Feelings	Senior Managing Director Oh
1998	Soonpoong Clinic	Yeong-gyu
1998	Paper Crane	Ji-sung Bu
1999	Lost One's Way	
1999	Beautiful Secret	Uncle
1999	Love in 3 Colors	Lee Sung-chul
1999	Oh Happy Day	Park Yeong-gyu
1999	Kuk-hee	Song Joo-tae
2000	Virtue	Jung Han-gu
2000	Mr. Duke	Jang In-chul
2001	How Should I Be?	Gu Seok-ki
2001	Can't Help Being Born Well	Park Yeong-gyu
2002	Great Ambition	Choi Seon-jae
2003	Damo	Jo Se-wook
2003	Honest Living	Park Yeong-gyu
2004	Emperor of the Sea	Seol Pyeong
2006	Common Single	Tae-soo
2009	High Kick Through the Roof	Ja-ok's friend, Park Yeong-gyu (cameo, ep 88)
2011	Protect the Boss	Chairman Cha Bong-man
2011	A Thousand Days' Promise	Noh Hong-gil
2012	I Do, I Do	Park Kwang-seok
2013	A Hundred Year Legacy	Kang Jin
2013	Princess Aurora	Oh Wang-sung
2014	Jeong Do-jeon	Yi In-im
2014	My Love from the Star	Heo Jun (cameo, ep 11)
2014	The Three Musketeers	Kim Ja-jeom
2014	My Lovely Girl	Lee Jong-ho
2015	Angry Mom	Hong Sang-bok
2015	Beating Again	Kang Hyun-chul
2015	Splendid Politics	King Seonjo
2015	The Man in the Mask	Jung Do-sung
2015	Assembly	Park Choon-sub
2015	My Mom	Chairman Uhm
2016	Monster	Do Choong
2017	Good Manager	Park Hyun Do
2018	Are You Human?	Nam Gun-ho
2019	Beautiful Love, Wonderful Life	Kim Yeong-woong
2020	Run On	Gi Jung-do
2025	Villains Everywhere	Oh Young-gyu

=== Web series ===
Year	Title	Role	Notes	Ref.
2021	Work Later, Drink Now	President Park	Cameo	

=== Theater ===
Year	Title	Role
	A Doll's House	Torvald Helmer
2010	Spamalot	King Arthur

== Discography ==
Year	Title	Notes
1995	Chameleon	Album
2010	"Suffer Patiently Again Today"	track from Attack the Gas Station 2 OST
2013	"뚫어"	track from A Hundred Year Legacy OST

== Awards and nominations ==
Year	Award	Category	Nominated work	Result
1993	29th Baeksang Arts Awards	Most Popular Actor (Film)	The Emperor of Romance	Won
1998	SBS Drama Awards	Excellence Award, Actor in Sitcom	Soonpoong Clinic	Won
1999	20th Blue Dragon Film Awards	Best Supporting Actor	Attack the Gas Station	Nominated
2000	37th Grand Bell Awards	Best Supporting Actor	Attack the Gas Station	Nominated
2000	SBS Drama Awards	Grand Prize (Daesang) in Sitcom	Soonpoong Clinic	Won
2000	SBS Drama Awards	Top Excellence Award, Actor	Virtue	Nominated
2000	SBS Drama Awards	Big Star Award	Virtue	Won
2011	SBS Drama Awards	Special Award, Actor in a Drama Special	Protect the Boss	Won
2014	3rd APAN Star Awards	Excellence Award, Actor in a Serial Drama	Jeong Do-jeon	Nominated
2014	KBS Drama Awards	Excellence Award, Actor in a Serial Drama	Jeong Do-jeon	Won
2014	SBS Drama Awards	Special Award, Actor in a Miniseries	My Lovely Girl	Nominated
2015	MBC Drama Awards	Excellence Award, Actor in a Serial Drama	My Mom	Won
