= Mapado =

- Theatrical release poster
- Hangul: 마파도
- RR: Mapado
- MR: Map'ado
- Directed by: Choo Chang-min
- Written by: Jo Joong-hoon
- Produced by: Kim Sung-jin
- Starring: Lee Moon-sik; Lee Jung-jin
- Cinematography: Baek Dong-hyeon
- Edited by: Jang Si-yeon
- Music by: Kim Jun-seok
- Production company: Corea Entertainment
- Distributed by: CJ Entertainment
- Release date: March 10, 2005
- Running time: 105 minutes
- Country: South Korea
- Language: Korean

Mapado (Korean: 마파도) is a 2005 South Korean comedy film directed by Choo Chang-min.

== Plot ==
A gangster and a corrupt police officer travel to the tiny remote island of Mapado to hunt down a young woman who has run off with a winning lottery ticket. Upon arriving, they discover that no one lives there except for five old women who have not once seen a man for 20 years. Both men soon experience a nightmare of hard labour and harassment.

== Title ==
Do can either mean "province" or "island" in Korean. Seom means island in the Korean language as well, although "do" is a Sino-Korean word used in name compound words, but "seom" can stand alone. Filming for Mapado did not take place on an island, but in Dongbaek village in Yeonggwang County, South Korea.
