= Kim Ji-min (actress) =

South Korean actress (born 2000)

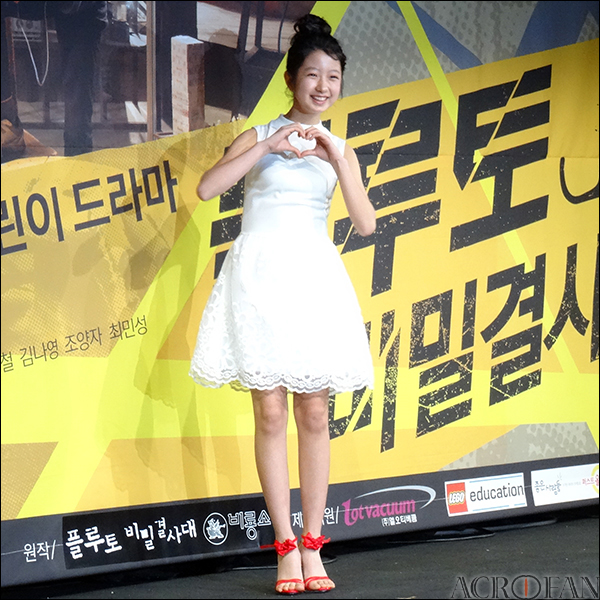
- Kim in August 2014
- Born: February 12, 2000 (age 26); South Korea
- Education: Chung-Ang University
- Occupation: Actress
- Years active: 2003–present
- Agent: SM C&C

Korean name
- Hangul: 김지민
- Hanja: 金志珉
- RR: Gim Jimin
- MR: Kim Chimin

Kim Ji-min (Korean: 김지민; born February 12, 2000) is a South Korean actress. She is best known for her roles in Goddess of Fire (2013) and Pluto Secret Society (2014). Since January 2020, she is part of SM C&C (under SM Entertainment).

== Filmography ==
=== Film ===
Year	Title	Role
2014	A Dynamite Family	Soo-jung
2016	After Love	Eun-hong (young)

=== Television series ===
Year	Title	Role	Notes	Ref.
2008	Bitter Sweet Life	Ha Na-rae		
2009	What's for Dinner?	Yoo Sun-young		
2009	Hometown Legends "The Masked Ghost"	Song Ka-seop (young)		
2011	Living in Style	Na Geum-sung		
2013	Samsaengi	teenage Bong Geum-ok		
2013	Goddess of Fire	Shim Hwa-ryung (young)		
2014	Pluto Secret Society	Kang Ha-ra		
2015	Assembly	Jin Joo-min		
2015	Sweet, Savage Family	Yoon Soo-min		
2016	Lucky Romance	Shim Bo-ra		
2017	Super Family 2017	Na Ik-hee		
2017	Money Flower	Na Mo-hyun (young)		
2018	Prison Playbook	Kim Eun-Su	Cameo	
2018	Gangnam Beauty	Do Kyung-hee		
2018	Top Management	Park Seul-gi		
2019	The Secret Life of My Secretary	Jung Nam-hee		

== Awards and nominations ==
Year	Award	Category	Nominated work	Result
2014	9th Seoul International Drama Awards	People's Choice Actress	Pluto Secret Society	Nominated
2015	29th KBS Drama Awards	Best Young Actress	Assembly	Nominated
2017	25th SBS Drama Awards	Youth Acting Award	Super Family 2017	Won
