= My Beloved Sister =

- Promotional poster
- Also known as: My Sister; My Older Sister; Elder Sister; Noona; Nuna
- Genre: Drama; Romance; Family
- Written by: Kim Jung-soo
- Directed by: Oh Kyung-hoon
- Starring: Song Yoon-ah; Kim Sung-soo
- Country of origin: South Korea
- Original language: Korean
- No. of episodes: 55

Production
- Running time: 60 minutes

Original release
- Network: Munhwa Broadcasting Corporation
- Release: August 12, 2006 – February 18, 2007

My Beloved Sister (Korean: 누나; RR: Nuna; lit. Older Sister) is a 2006 South Korean television series starring Song Yoon-ah and Kim Sung-soo. It aired on MBC from August 12, 2006 to February 18, 2007 on Saturdays and Sundays at 19:55 for 55 episodes.

Song stars as the titular older sister who must carry the family when the world is pulled out from under her.

== Plot ==
Coming from a wealthy family, graduate art student Yoon Seung-joo (Song Yoon-ah) has always lived life with confidence and strong will. She is self-centered, fickle, and quick to lose her temper with her brothers yet is sweet to her boyfriend. But when their father goes bankrupt and then disappears, Seung-joo is suddenly thrown into the real world, facing debt, poverty and hardships for the first time in her life. Now the head of the household with its attendant responsibilities, she must take care of her younger brothers while holding on to her pride even when there is nowhere to turn. Seung-joo learns that there's more to life than greed and the pursuit of money; she approaches life's happy and dark moments with a light, sincere heart and gains courage and determination in the face of adversity. During these difficult times, Geon-woo (Kim Sung-soo) comes back into her life. A university lecturer, Geon-woo broke up with Seung-joo in the past because of his humble family background, but now he wants a second chance to help – and love – Seung-joo again.

== Cast ==
=== Main characters ===
- Song Yoon-ah as Yoon Seung-joo
- Kim Sung-soo as Kim Geon-woo
- Heo Young-ran as Yoon Soo-ah, Seung-joo's cousin
- Kang Kyung-joon as Kim Geon-se, Geon-woo's brother

=== Supporting characters ===
Yoon family

- Jo Kyung-hwan as Seung-joo's father
- Baek Min-hyun as Yoon Hyuk-joo, Seung-joo's brother
- Maeng Se-chang as Yoon Young-joo, Seung-joo's brother
- Jo Hyung-ki as Soo-ah's father
- Song Ok-sook as Soo-ah's mother

Kim family

- Yoon Yoo-sun as Kim Geon-sook, Geon-woo's sister
- Park Geun-hyung as Geon-woo's father
- Kim Ja-ok as Geon-woo's mother
- Oh Hyun-kyung as Geon-woo's grandfather

Extended cast

- Ahn Yeon-hong as Noh Yoo-soon
- Yang Hee-kyung as Geon-woo's aunt
- Kang Nam-gil as Geon-woo's aunt's husband
- Kim Sun-hwa as grocery store owner
- Jung Ho-keun as loan shark
- Park Eun-bin as Ji-na, Young-joo's classmate
- Song Seung-hwan as Ji-na's father
- Jung Hye-sun as Ji-na's grandmother
