= Attack the Gas Station =

- Korean original theatrical poster
- Hangul: 주유소 습격 사건
- Hanja: 注油所 襲擊事件
- RR: Juyuso seupgyeok sageon
- MR: Chuyuso sŭpkyŏk sakŏn
- Directed by: Kim Sang-jin
- Written by: Park Jung-woo
- Produced by: Kim Mi-hee
- Starring: Lee Sung-jae; Yu Oh-seong; Kang Sung-jin; Yoo Ji-tae; Park Yeong-gyu
- Cinematography: Choi Jung-woo
- Edited by: Ko Im-pyo
- Music by: Sohn Moo-hyun
- Production company: Cinema Service
- Distributed by: Cinema Service
- Release date: 2 October 1999
- Running time: 120 minutes
- Country: South Korea
- Language: Korean

Attack the Gas Station (Korean: 주유소 습격 사건) is a 1999 Korean crime comedy film, directed by Kim Sang-jin and written by Park Jung-woo.

The film tells the story of a quartet of thugs who rob a gas station out of sheer boredom, having robbed it only a few days previously. Unable to get any money from the register, they take everyone hostage and start dispensing gas and keeping the money. The film becomes progressively more and more farcical, as the characters find different ways of amusing themselves, mostly through the mixed cast of characters that come in through the gas station. However, it's only a matter of time before they start upsetting the wrong people.

During the question and answer session at a screening during the 2000 Vancouver International Film Festival, director Kim Sang-jin indicated that the film inspired real-life copycats in South Korea.

The cast featured Lee Sung-jae, Yu Oh-seong, Yoo Ji-tae, and Lee Yo-won.

A sequel, Attack the Gas Station 2, was released on 2010.

== Plot ==
Having robbed and thoroughly destroyed a gas station, a group of street thugs with gripes against society rob a gas station convenience store (as the title card reads, "Why do they attack the gas station? Just because!"). But, since the manager had the foresight and sense to stash away the money, the four gang members take the manager and the employees hostage, dispensing gas on all the customers.

A range of characters stop for gas throughout the film, not all with good intentions, but with ludicrous results. A gang of school bullies come by the gas station to harass one of the employees for money (they end up being taken hostages, while the bullied employee ends up being forced into a fist fight with one of the bullies... and wins) The police come by demanding free gasoline (the four thugs refuse, as the police clearly aren't doing their job). A customer refuses to pay for a full tank of gas, only asking for half a tank, and is taken hostage. More school bullies come by the gas station, seeking revenge for the first fight, but then they too are taken hostage. The four titular thugs also order unusually large amounts of food from a Chinese restaurant, and the deliveryman becomes suspicious.

It's not long until they start attracting the wrong kind of attention, which leads to a violent confrontation with the police and further gang members. The fight ends when No Mark sprays everyone in the chaos with gasoline and threatens to throw a lighter at them. The four thugs escape while everyone else remains panicked at the gas station.

During the credits, four scenes show what the characters do after the events in the film. Paint appears to be a successful painter, but he angers a customer when he celebrates by spilling red paint all over one of the paintings. Rockstar restarts his career as a lead singer, and he bosses his members as they prepare for their next performance. Bulldozer becomes a policeman, and he scolds teenagers for smoking. He punishes the kids the same way he dealt with the hostages, and warns them about their futures by alluding to his own past. No Mark joins a baseball team, but accidentally hits the catcher while pitching.

== Cast and characters ==
- Lee Sung-jae - No Mark: The leader of the group. He was an aspiring baseball player, but as an orphan, he didn't have the same opportunities as everyone else.
- Yu Oh-seong - Mu Dae-po (also known as Bulldozer or Mad Dog): The enforcer who carries around a really big stick. He has a big problem with authority, as his run-ins have led to his punishment, regardless of how good his intentions were.
- Kang Sung-jin - Ddan Dda-ra (Rockstar): The resident musician. Was a member of a rock band, but was forced out because of a few bad business decisions with the wrong people.
- Yoo Ji-tae - Paint: Was once an aspiring artist, although his father wouldn't have anything to do with it.
- Park Yeong-gyu - Gas station owner
- Jung Joon - Geon-bbang, a crew of the gas station
- Lee Yo-won - Ggal-chi, a crew of the gas station
- Lee Jeong-ho - Meek man
- Kim Soo-ro - a delivery man
- Lee Won-jong - a policeman
- Jeong So-yeong
- Yoo Hae-jin - Yonggari, one of the gang leaders
- Lee Jong-hyuk - a member of Yonggari's gang

== Social commentary ==
Attack the Gas Station was released around a time of economic turmoil in South Korea in the mid-to-late 1990s called the "IMF crisis," culminating with many Korean car manufacturers laying off thousands of employees. There are many allusions to this throughout the film, mostly when Paint discovers framed pieces of paper with slogans promoting a productive work force (which he subsequently destroys in a fit of rage).

The film also makes a comment on American economic imperialism during a scene where Ddan Dda-Ra drinks from a can of Pepsi and a police officer chides him for his choice, chastising him for "giving money to the Yankees". The young punk defends his choice, saying that Pepsi is a Korean product, referring to the Pepsi logo's resemblance of the Taeguk symbol on the South Korean flag.

== See also ==
- Cinema of Korea
- Contemporary culture of South Korea
- List of Korean-language films
- Attack the Gas Station 2
- Attack the Block
- Darwaaza Bandh Rakho (Keep The Door Shut), a 2006 Bollywood movie by J. D. Chakravarthy that may have been influenced by the film
