= The K2 =

2016 South Korean television series

- Promotional poster
- Genre: Action; Melodrama; Political thriller
- Created by: Jinnie Choi; Studio Dragon
- Written by: Jang Hyuk-rin
- Directed by: Kwak Jung-hwan; Sung Yong-il
- Starring: Ji Chang-wook; Song Yoon-ah; Im Yoon-ah; Jo Sung-ha; Kim Kap-soo
- Composer: Choi Cheol-ho
- Country of origin: South Korea
- Original language: Korean
- No. of episodes: 16

Production
- Executive producer: Park Ho-sik
- Producers: Kim Geun-hong; Moon Boo-mi
- Production locations: Seoul, South Korea; Barcelona, Spain
- Running time: 60 mins
- Production company: HB Entertainment

Original release
- Network: tvN
- Release: September 23 – November 12, 2016

The K2 (Korean: 더 케이투) is a 2016 South Korean television series starring Ji Chang-wook, Song Yoon-ah, Im Yoon-ah and Jo Sung-ha . It premiered on tvN every Friday and Saturday at 20:00 (KST) from September 23 to November 12, 2016 for 16 episodes.

== Plot ==
Kim Je-ha is a former mercenary soldier for the PMC Blackstone. While in Iraq, Je-ha is framed for the murder of his lover Raniya, a civilian, and becomes a fugitive. Je-ha escapes and returns to South Korea, where he is offered work as a bodyguard by Choi Yoo-jin, the owner of JSS Security Company and wife of presidential candidate Jang Se-joon. Je-ha accepts the job in exchange for resources that he needs to exact revenge on Jang's rival presidential candidate, Park Kwan-soo, the man who Je-ha witnessed ordering Raniya's killing.

Je-ha is assigned to guard Go An-na, Jang Se-joon's secret daughter, as An-na's life is always threatened because of her stepmother Yoo-jin. An-na, who has been a recluse and lonely all her life, starts relying on Je-ha, who shows concern for her and protects her. They slowly fall in love, causing Je-ha to be torn between having to work with his boss Yoo-jin to exact revenge on Park Kwan-soo and protecting An-na against the wishes of Yoo-jin.

Another key figure is Choi Sung-won, Choi Yoo-jin's half brother and the son of her father's mistress and eventual second wife, who is his half-sister's fierce rival. Plotting with Park Kwan-soo, Sung-won eventually causes the deaths of Jang Se-joon and Choi Yoo-jin but later pays for this with his life at the hands of Choi Yoo-jin's devoted assistant Kim Dong-mi. Park hangs himself for his atrocious acts and Je-ha finally proves his innocence and achieves his goal of revenge. Je-ha and An-na leave for a foreign country and embrace each other. An-na asks Je-ha for his real name, but the credits roll before Je-ha reveals it.

== Cast ==
=== Main ===
- Ji Chang-wook as Kim Je-ha / K2
  - Choi Seung-hoon as young Kim Je-ha

The main protagonist of the series. He is a former South Korean special forces and Blackstone military operative who had been stationed in Iraq until he flees South Korea after being framed for murder. His skills come to the attention of Choi Yoo-jin, who hires him to work for her security agency JSS Security under the codename K2, and is assigned as bodyguard to Go An-na, the secret illegitimate daughter of Choi's husband, Jang Se-joon. The name "Kim Je-ha" is not Je-ha's real name but an alias he uses to conceal his identity while working as An-na's bodyguard; the name actually belongs to a victim of an unsolved missing person case. The real name of the protagonist is unknown throughout the show, except that his real surname is said to be Kim.

- Song Yoon-ah as Choi Yoo-jin

She is the wife of Jang Se-joon. The eldest daughter of a chaebol family, she was disinherited from the JB Group conglomerate as her father disapproved of a politician as a son-in-law, although she received control of JSS Security. Ambitious and merciless, her corrupt nature is due to the result of her upbringing. She sets her sights on becoming the First Lady and is willing to manipulate An-na and her husband to further her aims. As the series progresses, she begins to develop feelings for Je-ha after he rescues her from an exploding car.

- Im Yoon-ah as Go An-na or Anna
  - Lee Yoo-joo as young Go An-na

She is the illegitimate daughter of Jang Se-joon who is kept hidden from the public to protect his political career. After her father's affair was discovered, An-na was exiled from Korea and grew up in Spain at a convent, under the constant surveillance of her cruel stepmother Choi Yoo-jin. An-na has developed a social phobia and experiences panic attacks from flashing lights, a result of PTSD stemming from her past connection to the death of her biological mother. She returns to South Korea from Barcelona and becomes a pawn in her stepmother's plan to control her husband's political career from behind-the-scenes. She later falls in love with Je-ha.

- Jo Sung-ha as Jang Se-joon

He is a philandering presidential candidate partially responsible for corrupting his wife. He is also An-na's biological father. Because of An-na, whose existence is unknown to the public, he is unwillingly under the control of his corrupt wife, who blackmails him into doing her bidding. Throughout the series, he doesn't seem to show that he cares for his daughter, but later he reveals to Je-ha that he truly loves her and is willing to submit to his wife just to keep An-na safe.

- Kim Kap-soo as Park Kwan-soo

He is Se-joon's political rival and leader of the current ruling party. He is the main antagonist of the series.

=== Supporting ===
- Lee Jung-jin as Choi Sung-won

Yoo-jin's younger half-brother and the current CEO of the chaebol JB Group. Both he and his sister are at odds for the majority control of both JSS Security and their family company. He also constantly tries to get Je-ha to join him, believing him to be a powerful person, but Je-ha continuously refuses due to his loyalty to Yoo-jin, until Sung-won convinces An-na first.

- Shin Dong-mi as Kim Dong-mi

She is Yoo-jin's personal secretary and right-hand woman. She greatly dislikes Je-ha and attempts to kill him on several occasions.

- Lee Ye-eun as Jang Mi-ran

She is one of the personal bodyguards working alongside Je-ha to protect An-na, operating under the codename J4. She had a crush on Je-ha at first, but later accepted Sung-gyu's confession of love.

- Lee Jae-woo as Kang Sung-gyu

He is one of the personal bodyguards working alongside Je-ha and Mi-ran to protect An-na, operating under the codename K1. He is in love with Mi-ran, who later reciprocated his feelings.

- Lee Chul-min as Park Kwan-soo's aide
- Song Kyung-chul as Song Young-chun
- So Hee-jung as Head of JSS medical team.
- Jeon Bae-soo as Joo Chul-ho, JH's former commander in Iraq, now JSS mercenary in charge of SJ and YJ's security where he is often known as Chief Joo.

=== Extended ===
- Park Soon-chun as Choi Sung-won's mother
- Ko In-beom as Guk Chae-wan
- Lee Soon-won as JSS body guard team leader
- Jo Jae-ryong as Secretary Sung
- Kim Ik-tae as Old man helping Je-ha
- Kwon Soo-hyun as Bodyguard
- Jung Ji-young as Noh Ji-yeon
- Yeom Hye-ran as Housekeeper
- Park Gun
- Yoo In-hyuk as Dong-mi's bodyguard and former baseball player.
- Yoon Joo-bin
- Oh Sang-hoon as Battalion captain
- Kim Kyung-ryong as Lee Kyung-jin
- Ji Yoon-jae as Kwan-soo's bodyguard and detective with scar.
- Jung Se-hyung as Detective
- Park Kyun-rak as Prosecutor
- Kim Hyun as Helper
- Carson Allen as Raniya

=== Special appearances ===
- Joo Sae-byuk as Woman having affair with Jang Se-joon (ep. 1)
- Anupam Tripathi as wounded man (ep.2)
- Son Tae-young as Uhm Hye-rin, An-na's mother and a former famous star.
- Jo Hee-bong as Police officer
- Sung Dong-il as Police officer (ep. 3)
- Yoo Seung-mok as Congressman Kim (ep. 1, 12)
- Lee Han-wi as President's secretary (ep. 10)
- Jo Dong-hyuk as JSS Special Ops captain (ep. 8)
- Choi Jung-min
- Park Jung-sang

== Production ==
The drama is written by scriptwriter Jang Hyuk-rin, who wrote Yong-pal (2015) and directed by Kwak Jung-hwan of Neighborhood Hero (2016).

Being depicted with a bodyguard action theme, the drama utilized various fighting techniques including systema, taekwondo, aikido, and jujutsu for its action scenes. It became the first Korean television drama to introduce the Bullet Time effect.

The first script reading was held in August 2016 at the CJ E&M Center in Seoul, South Korea. Filming began in September.

Some scenes of the drama, primarily in episodes 1 and 2, were filmed in Catalonia (along the mountain of Montserrat, the Gothic and Baroque Cistercian Monastery of Santes Creus in Aiguamúrcia), followed by various places in Barcelona (center, Old City, etc., as well as various metro / commuter rail stations such as Plaça d'Espanya and Magòria / La Campana), Gaudí's Modernista Colònia Güell Crypt (fashion show party) among other locations in Spain (probably near Almería for the Iraq War desert locations). The closing scene of episode 16 was filmed at Barcelona's Turó de la Rovira hill. The rest of the series was apparently filmed in Korea.

The male lead Ji Chang-wook, due to his casting, became the highest-paid actor for a tvN drama. He had special training and performed the action stunts in the drama by himself, without a body double. At the press conference, director Kwak expressed "On top of Ji's splendid action, the drama will tell the story of insatiable desire and political fights between people holding secrets of their own."

== Original soundtrack ==
The K2 OST

Soundtrack album by Various Artists
- Released: November 11, 2016
- Genres: K-pop, soundtrack
- Label: CJ E&M Music

The K2 OST
No.	Title	Artist(s)	Length
1.	"The K2 Main Theme"	Various Artists	6:45
2.	"Today" (오늘도)	Kim Bo-hyung	3:44
3.	"Sometimes" (아주 가끔)	U Sung-eun	3:51
4.	"Amazing Grace"	Yoona	2:13
5.	"Love You"	Min Kyung-hoon	3:50
6.	"As Time Stops" (시간이 멈춘듯)	Park Kwang-sun	4:57
7.	"Anemone"	Jan	3:52
8.	"The Witch and the Girl"	Various Artists	3:56
9.	"Mirror Mirror"	Yang Sun-mi	2:52
10.	"Wolf Knight"	Yang Sun-mi	4:44
11.	"Quando Corpus Morietur"	Various Artists	5:01
12.	"Wolf's Song"	Yang Sun-mi	3:30
13.	"Serenade"	Yang Sun-mi	3:38
14.	"Witching Hour"	Various Artists	2:40
15.	"The Witch's Advice"	Kim Min-young	3:01
16.	"Der Rosenkavalier"	Various Artists	4:59
17.	"Against the Odds"	Various Artists	3:25
18.	"A Queen of the Forest"	Various Artists	4:37
19.	"Anna's Appassionata"	Various Artists	3:11
20.	"Anemone"	Yang Sun-mi	3:45
Total length:			1:18:31

== Reception ==
The K2 received favorable reviews, topping cable channel viewership ratings throughout its 8-week broadcast. Till 2023, the drama streamed internationally on Netflix with English subtitles and its broadcasting rights were sold to Vietnam, Taiwan, Hong Kong, Japan, Singapore, Indonesia, Malaysia, Philippines, China, Thailand, Israel and Greece.

== Ratings ==
Ep.	Original broadcast date	Average audience share		
Ep.	Original broadcast date	Nielsen Korea		TNmS
Ep.	Original broadcast date	Nationwide	Seoul	Nationwide
1	September 23, 2016	3.225%	3.257%	4.2%
2	September 24, 2016	3.396%	3.821%	4.9%
3	September 30, 2016	4.390%	4.743%	4.6%
4	October 1, 2016	3.948%	3.936%	5.4%
5	October 7, 2016	4.622%	4.820%	5.2%
6	October 8, 2016	6.636%	8.489%	5.6%
7	October 14, 2016	5.059%	5.343%	6.1%
8	October 15, 2016	5.707%	7.410%	6.4%
9	October 21, 2016	4.849%	5.410%	4.6%
10	October 22, 2016	5.646%	6.688%	5.2%
11	October 28, 2016	4.932%	5.817%	4.5%
12	October 29, 2016	5.369%	5.717%	5.0%
13	November 4, 2016	4.489%	5.210%	4.5%
14	November 5, 2016	4.574%	5.279%	5.4%
15	November 11, 2016	5.523%	6.538%	5.2%
16	November 12, 2016	5.467%	6.537%	5.5%
Average		4.865%	5.563%	5.1%
In the table above, the blue numbers represent the lowest ratings and the red numbers represent the highest ratings.; This drama airs on a cable channel/pay TV which normally has a relatively smaller audience compared to free-to-air TV/public broadcasters (KBS, SBS, MBC and EBS).

== Awards and nominations ==
Year	Award	Category	Recipient	Result	Ref.
2016	Asia Artist Awards	Popularity Award	Im Yoon-ah	Won	
2016	Asia Artist Awards	Asia Star Award	Im Yoon-ah	Won	
2016	31st Korea's Best Dresser Swan Awards	Best Dressed Actress	Im Yoon-ah	Won	
2016	31st Korea's Best Dresser Swan Awards	Best Dressed Actor	Ji Chang-wook	Won	
2017	5th Annual DramaFever Awards	Best Bad Boy	Ji Chang-wook	Won	
2017	5th Annual DramaFever Awards	Best Villain	Song Yoon-ah	Nominated	
