= Seven Years of Night =

2018 film by Choo Chang-min

- Theatrical release poster
- Hangul: 7년의 밤
- Hanja: 7年의 밤
- RR: 7nyeonui bam
- MR: 7nyŏnŭi pam
- Directed by: Choo Chang-min
- Screenplay by: Choo Chang-min; Lee Yong-yeon; Kim You-pyung
- Based on: Seven Years of Night by Jung Yoo-jung
- Produced by: Ahn Eun-mi; Yoon Kyung-hwan
- Starring: Ryu Seung-ryong; Jang Dong-gun; Song Sae-byeok; Ko Kyung-pyo
- Cinematography: Ha Kyoung-ho
- Edited by: Shin Min-kyung
- Music by: Koo Ja-wan; Park Ji-man
- Production companies: CJ E&M Corp
- Distributed by: CJ Entertainment
- Release date: March 28, 2018
- Running time: 123 minutes
- Country: South Korea
- Language: Korean
- Box office: US$3.7 million

Seven Years of Night (Korean: 7년의 밤) is a 2018 South Korean action drama film directed by Choo Chang-min, starring Ryu Seung-ryong, Jang Dong-gun, Song Sae-byeok and Ko Kyung-pyo. The film is based on Jung Yoo-jung's novel of the same name. It was released on March 28, 2018.

== Plot ==
The story of a man who plots revenge against the son of his daughter's murderer over a period of seven years.

== Cast ==
- Ryu Seung-ryong as Choi Hyun-soo
  - Jung Joon-won as young Hyun-soo

A man who is haunted by an unintended murder of a young girl seven years ago.

- Jang Dong-gun as Oh Young-je

The father who seeks revenge for his murdered daughter.

- Song Sae-byeok as Ahn Seung-hwan

Hyun-soo's co-worker.

- Ko Kyung-pyo as Seo-won
  - Tang Joon-sang as Young Seo-won

Hyun-soo's son.

- Moon Jeong-hee as Kang Eun-joo
- Sung Byung-sook as Ha-yong's mother
- Lee Re as Oh Se-ryeong
- Kim Hyun as Woman who lost her husband
- Jeon Bae-soo as Hyeon-tae
- Jeong Seok-yong

== Production and release ==
Filming began on November 19, 2016, and completed on May 25, 2016.

After nearly two years since the film was completed, the local release was set for March 28, 2018.

== Awards and nominations ==
Award ceremony	Category	Recipient(s)	Result	Ref.
55th Grand Bell Awards	Best Supporting Actor	Song Sae-byeok	Nominated	
