= Hong Kong Express (TV series) =

South Korean television series

- Genre: Drama, Romance
- Written by: Kim Sung-hee
- Directed by: Jo Nam-kook
- Starring: Cho Jae-hyun; Song Yoon-ah; Cha In-pyo
- Composer: Park Se-joon (Music Manager)
- Country of origin: South Korea
- No. of episodes: 16

Production
- Executive producers: Moon Jung-soo; Kim Young-sup (SBS)
- Producer: Kim Yang
- Running time: 60 minutes Wednesdays and Thursdays at 21:55 (KST)
- Production companies: SidusHQ; Castle in the Sky

Original release
- Network: Seoul Broadcasting System
- Release: February 16 – April 7, 2005

Hong Kong Express (Korean: 홍콩 익스프레스) is a 2005 South Korean television series starring Cho Jae-hyun, Song Yoon-ah, Cha In-pyo and Kim Hyo-jin. It aired on SBS from February 16 to April 7, 2005 on Wednesdays and Thursdays at 21:55 for 16 episodes.

== Plot ==
Han Jung-yeon is an interior designer living in Hong Kong who's engaged to rich tycoon Choi Kang-hyuk. But before she can marry her rich boyfriend, she comes across her old flame Kang Min-soo. Adding to Jung-yeon's confusion about her love life, is a murder in which both men may be involved.

== Cast ==
Main characters

- Cho Jae-hyun as Kang Min-soo
- Song Yoon-ah as Han Jung-yeon
- Cha In-pyo as Choi Kang-hyuk
- Kim Hyo-jin as Choi Ma-ri

Supporting characters

- Oh Sang-moo as Song Doo-re
- Lee Young-eun as Jo Bong-soon
- Jung Ae-yeon as Jung Eun-ha
- Jo Sang-ki as Kim Bi-seo
- Yoon Hyun-sook as Hong Yoo-shin
- Park Geun-hyung as chairman Choi Jae-sub
- Kim Hye-ok as Ms. Min
- Park Jung-soo as Shin Kyung-ja
- Kim Sung-kyum as Professor Han
- Shin Dong-wook^{1} as Joo Young-yuk
- Kim Eun-soo as Jennifer

== Notes ==
- ^{1}Credited as Shin Hwa-shik.

== See also ==
- List of Korean television shows
- Contemporary culture of South Korea
- Action drama
