= Kang Sung-jin =

South Korean actor (born 1971)

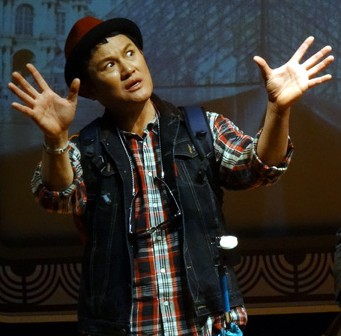
- Kang in 2014
- Born: January 13, 1971 (age 55); Yangpyeong-gun, Gyeonggi-do, South Korea
- Occupation: Actor

Korean name
- Hangul: 강성진
- Hanja: 姜聲振
- RR: Gang Seongjin
- MR: Kang Sŏngjin

Kang Sung-jin (born January 13, 1971) is a South Korean actor. Kang acted in the lead role in The Humanist (2001), APT (2006), Mission Possible: Kidnapping Granny K (2007) and Life Is Cool (2008).

== Personal life ==
His niece is actress Kang Byul.

== Filmography ==
=== Film ===
Year	Title	Role
1991	Teenage Love Song	Jong-soo
1992	Mister Mama	
1993	Two Cops	
1994	The Young Man	
1994	How to Top My Wife	"Big"
1995	Mom Has a New Boyfriend	
1996	Two cops 2	
1996	Final Blow	Genji
1997	Do the Right Thing	
1997	Baby Sale	Ji-hyun's brother
1998	The Last Attempt	
1998	Two Cops 3	
1998	Tie a Yellow Ribbon	
1999	Attack the Gas Station	Ddan Dda-ra
2000	Weathering the Storms	Aide
2001	The Humanist	Euglena
2001	Kick the Moon	(cameo)
2001	Hi! Dharma!	Nal-chi
2001	The Last Witness	
2002	Fun Movie	(cameo)
2002	Break Out	Bum-soo
2002	Jail Breakers	Yong Moon-sin
2003	Reversal of Fortune	Dae-shik
2003	Silmido	Chan-suk
2004	Some	Officer Lee
2006	Running Wild	Hong Jae-geun
2006	APT	Detective Yang Na-sun
2007	Big Bang	Ma Dong-chul
2007	Mission Possible: Kidnapping Granny K	Do-bum
2008	Life Is Cool	Kim Tae-yeong
2010	Dreams Come True	Kim Eung-tae
2011	Shotgun Love	Assistant director (cameo)
2013	Fists of Legend	Announcer
2013	Top Star	Reporter Park

=== Television series ===
Year	Title	Role
2003	Long Live Love	Dong-sik
2006	One Fine Day	Goo Sung-chan/James
2007	Get Karl! Oh Soo-jung	Jung Woo-tak
2007	The Devil That Pours Red Wine	Jin Ah-shim
2008	The Lawyers of the Great Republic Korea	Reporter Bae Soo-jin
2008	Here He Comes	Kang Sung-jin
2008	Fight	Oh Dal-shik
2009	Two Wives	Ahn Kyung-tae
2010	Cinderella's Stepsister	Yang Hae-jin
2010	Three Sisters	Gun-dal (cameo)
2010	The King of Legend	Payun
2011	When Women Powder Twice	Joon-soo
2013	Ad Genius Lee Tae-baek	Ahn Jin-wook (cameo)
2013	Fantasy Tower	Min-chul
2014	God's Gift: 14 Days	Cha Bong-sub (episodes 3–6)
2014	A Witch's Love	Byun Seok-ki
2014	Gunman in Joseon	Kim Moo-deok
2015	Hyde Jekyll, Me	Audition Judge
2015	Hidden Identity	Nam In-ho
2015	All About My Mom	Kim Kwang-ryeol
2016	Jang Yeong-sil	Seok-gu
2016	That Sun in the Sky	CEO Choi
2016	My Fair Lady	Go Joon-pil
2017	Return of Bok Dan-ji	Hwang Geum-bong
2017	Two Cops	Ji Dal-ho
2017	Temporary Idols	Kang Sung-jin

=== Variety show ===
Year	Title	Notes/Ref.
2021	Star Golf Big League	Cast Member

== Theater ==
Year	English title	Korean title	Role	Ref.
2022	Come Back	돌아온다	Restaurant owner	
2023	Wonderful Hill	폭풍의 언덕		

== Discography ==
=== Soundtrack appearances ===
Year	Title	Notes
2008	"Promise"	track from Fight OST
