= The Good Son (Jeong novel) =

2016 South Korean novel

First edition

The Good Son (Korean: 종의 기원 Jong-ui Giwon 'The Origin of Species') is a novel by You-Jeong Jeong, first published in South Korea in 2016 by Eunhaengnamu (도서출판 은행나무) (ISBN 9788956609959). It was translated into English by Chi-Young Kim, with the translation published in 2018 by Little, Brown Book Group. This is the first Novel by Jeong to have an official English translation; the author created three novels prior to this one. Hachette India published the book in English in that country.

The book is about a murder; G. Sampath of The Hindu stated that the book centers on the "interiority" of the person who murders. Anuradha Varma of Indian Express wrote that the book "also touches upon complicated family dynamics and how death changes relationships."

== Contents ==
The main character is Han Yu-jin, 25 years old in the story, who has an adopted brother, Kim Hae-jin. Yu-jin finds his mother dead in his Incheon apartment and realizes that he is a murderer. He resented his mother for forbidding him from doing swimming and for giving preferential treatment to his adopted brother. Yu-jin decides what to do, and later has a confrontation with Hae-jin.

Walter Sim of the Straits Times stated that since the book reveals the identity of the murderer relatively early, The Good Son "evolves into a chilling psychological look down the rabbit hole into a seriously unhinged mind." Much of the novel includes Yu-jin having self-dialogs. Varma stated that the apartment, where the story takes place, "is in keeping with the sparse theme."

== Reception ==
Sim stated that the book is "dark and claustrophobic" and had a positive reception.

Sampath concluded that overall the book "is the stuff of classic page-turners." He states that the "oversimplified prose" is the sole "irritant".

J. David Osborne of El Paso, Texas, in World Literature Today concluded that it "is a perfect read for an airplane ride: it sucks you in with precision and holds your attention". Osborne argued that the book "felt like reading a film" and that the self-dialogs "can at times become tedious, but it’s worth noting that the line between tedium and tension can be extremely thin." Osborne believed the ending was "satisfying".

Varma wrote that "The Good Son is a perfect weekend read or if you have a few hours to kill on the metro to and from work." Varma praised the translation, stating that it "doesn’t get in the way of the storytelling."

Nandita Bose of The Deccan Herald wrote that the book has "a fascinating and terrifying story". Bose stated that the conclusion "is shocking to the point of being funny except for the last chilling note."

Kirkus Reviews concludes that it is "A creepy, insidious, blood-drenched tale in which nothing is quite what it seems. " The publication described the development as "taut, high-tension wire, slowly letting it play out".

Publishers Weekly gave the book a star as a way of recommending it, and stated that "Readers who enjoy grappling with the issue of a narrator’s reliability will relish Yu-jin".
