= Baek Min-hyun =

South Korean actor

- Born: January 13, 1985 (age 41); Seoul, South Korea
- Other name: Baek Hyun
- Education: Dongguk University
- Occupation: Actor
- Years active: 2006–present
- Agent: The Way Company

Korean name
- Hangul: 백민현
- RR: Baek Minhyeon
- MR: Paek Minhyŏn

Baek Min-hyun (born January 13, 1985) is a South Korean actor. He made his acting debut in the television series My Beloved Sister (2006–2007).

== Filmography ==
=== Films ===
Year	Title	Role	Ref.
2006	Arang	Joon-ho	
2021	Ghost Mansion	Editor-in-chief (cameo)	

=== Television series ===
Year	Title	Role	Ref.
2006	Fallen Angel, Jenny	Hyun-se	
2006–2007	My Beloved Sister	Yoon Hyuk-joo	
2009	Empress Cheonchu	Kim Jin	
2011	While You Were Sleeping	Chae Woo-jin	
2012	Koisuru Maison: Rainbow Rose	Ji-hoo	
2015	Enchanting Neighbor	Gong Soo-geo	
2015	Hogu's Love	Man kicked by Ho-kyung (cameo)	
2020	In Your Dream	Kang In	
2021	On the Verge of Insanity	Ahn Joon-soo	
