= Late Blossom =

- Film poster
- Hangul: 그대를 사랑합니다
- RR: Geudaereul saranghamnida
- MR: Kŭdaerŭl saranghamnida
- Directed by: Choo Chang-min
- Written by: Choo Chang-min; Lee Man-hee; Kim Sang-su; Kim Yong-deok
- Based on: I Love You by Kang Full
- Produced by: Kim Sung-jin; Lee Gun-seon; Yoon Ki-chan; Nam Hyun
- Starring: Lee Soon-jae; Yoon So-jung; Song Jae-ho; Kim Soo-mi
- Cinematography: Choi Yun-man
- Edited by: Choo Chang-min; Go Ah-mo
- Music by: Kang Min-guk
- Distributed by: Next Entertainment World
- Release date: February 17, 2011
- Running time: 118 minutes
- Country: South Korea
- Language: Korean
- Box office: US$8.2 million

Late Blossom (Korean: 그대를 사랑합니다; lit. 'I Love You') is a 2011 South Korean film written and directed by Choo Chang-min about the love story of two elderly couples.

After opening quietly to little fanfare, the indie slowly gained positive word-of-mouth and critical praise, and eventually became a box office success with over 1,645,505 ticket sales, as well as a cultural darling among industry peers.

The film is based on the manhwa I Love You by Kang Full. It was serialized online in 2007 and later published in three volumes. In 2008, it was turned into a play and drew audiences of more than 120,000 by 2010.

== Plot ==
The movie revolves around four senior citizens living in a hillside village. Kim Man-seok is a cranky milkman with a short fuse and a foul mouth. He wakes the village early each morning with his noisy, battered motorcycle. He meets Song Ee-peun, who scavenges for scrap paper while roaming around the town at daybreak. As they meet again and again, they slowly develop feelings for each other.

Ms. Song parks her handcart at a junkyard and sees Jang Kun-bong, the caretaker of the parking lot next to the scrap yard. One day, Kun-bong wakes up late and forgets to lock his door and asks Ms. Song to fasten it for him. Meanwhile, Jang's Alzheimer's-afflicted wife Soon-yi wanders around the town, ending up on the back of Man-seok's motorbike.

== Cast ==
- Lee Soon-jae - Kim Man-seok
- Yoon So-jung - Song Ee-peun
- Song Jae-ho - Jang Kun-bong
- Kim Soo-mi - Jo Soon-yi
- Shin Soo-yeon - Hwang Min-ji
- Oh Dal-su - Dal-su
- Song Ji-hyo - Kim Yeon-ah
- Kim Hyung-jun - Jung Min-chae
- Lee Sang-hoon - Duk-bae
- Lee Moon-sik - Scratch
- Gil Hae-yeon - Kun-bong's daughter-in-law 1
- Jo Jae-yoon - Kun-bong's brother-in-law
- Kwon Bum-taek - Man-seok's wife's doctor
- Lee Chae-eun - young Ee-peun
- Kang Hyun-joong - young Sang-tae
- Lee Jun-hyeok - photographer
- Ra Mi-ran - nurse
- Lee Bong-ryun as Dong Office employee
- Jeon Bae-soo - public officer of small neighborhood office
- Lee Moon-su - Duk-bae's father
- Kim Hyang-gi - street light kid

== Box office ==
Initially difficult to finance due to ageism, the film was shot with a ₩1 billion (US$900,000) budget, and then marketed with another ₩1.1 billion (a small amount compared to most Korean mainstream films). The sleeper hit eventually recouped four times its cost in just a few weeks, attracting 1,645,505 admissions and grossing more than US$8,189,246 domestically.

== Spin-off ==
A same-titled 16-episode television series spin-off starring Kim Hyung-jun aired on SBS Plus from April to June 2012. Of the movie cast members, only Lee Soon-jae reprised his role.

== Awards ==
- 2011 Blue Dragon Film Awards: Best Supporting Actress - Kim Soo-mi
- 2011 China Golden Rooster and Hundred Flowers Film Festival: Best Actor, International Film category - Lee Soon-jae
