= Assembly (TV series) =

- Promotional poster
- Genre: Political drama
- Written by: Jung Hyun-min
- Directed by: Hwang In-hyuk
- Starring: Jung Jae-young; Song Yoon-ah; Ok Taec-yeon
- Music by: Park Se-jun
- Country of origin: South Korea
- Original language: Korean
- No. of episodes: 20

Production
- Executive producers: Kang Byun-taek; Lee Jae-gil; Yoon Chang-bum
- Producer: Kim Jin-woo
- Production locations: Seoul, South Korea
- Running time: 65 minutes
- Production companies: Assembly SPC; KBS Media; RaemongRaein Co. Ltd.

Original release
- Network: KBS 2TV
- Release: July 15 – September 17, 2015

Assembly (Korean: 어셈블리; RR: Eosembeulli) is a 2015 South Korean television series starring Jung Jae-young, Song Yoon-ah and Ok Taec-yeon. It aired on KBS2 on Wednesdays and Thursdays at 21:55 for 20 episodes beginning July 15, 2015.

== Plot ==
Jin Sang-pil has been a shipyard welder for 23 years, but when he and his fellow workers get laid off, he fights for their reinstatement as the spokesman for the labor union. To his surprise, this leads to him becoming a newly elected member of the National Assembly. But because of his idealism and naiveté, Sang-pil finds it difficult to navigate the corridors of politics. Enter whip-smart aide Choi In-kyung, who shows him the ropes and together they work to accomplish real change within the government.

== Cast ==
- Jung Jae-young as Jin Sang-pil
- Song Yoon-ah as Choi In-kyung
- Ok Taec-yeon as Kim Kyu-hwan
- Jang Hyun-sung as Baek Do-hyun
- Park Yeong-gyu as Park Choon-sub
- Kim Seo-hyung as Hong Chan-mi
- Lee Won-jae as Kang Sang-ho
- Jung Hee-tae as Im Kyu-tae
- Choi Jin-ho as Jo Woong-kyu
- Gil Hae-yeon as Chun No-shim
- Sung Ji-ru as Byun Sung-ki
- Yoon Bok-in as Oh Ae-ri
- Seo Hyun-chul as Seo Dong-jae
- Im Ji-kyu as Shim Dong-chun
- Kim Bo-mi as Song So-min
- Kang Ye-won as Park Da-jung
- Son Byong-ho as Bae Dal-soo
- Lee Hang-na as Kim Kyung-ah
- Kim Ji-min as Jin Joo-hee
- Cho Jae-hyun (cameo, episode 1)
- Tae In-ho

== Ratings ==
In the table below, the blue numbers represent the lowest ratings and the red numbers represent the highest ratings.

Episode	Broadcast date	TNmS ratings		AGB Nielsen ratings	
Episode	Broadcast date	Nationwide	Seoul Capital Area	Nationwide	Seoul Capital Area
1	July 15, 2015	4.8%	5.9%	5.2%	4.9%
2	July 16, 2015	3.4%	4.1%	4.7%	4.8%
3	July 22, 2015	4.0%	4.4%	5.2%	5.1%
4	July 23, 2015	3.8%	4.5%	4.9%	5.3%
5	July 29, 2015	4.4%	4.5%	5.0%	5.1%
6	July 30, 2015	3.7%	4.2%	4.8%	5.8%
7	August 5, 2015	4.7%	4.1%	5.3%	5.5%
8	August 6, 2015	3.7%	3.8%	4.9%	4.8%
9	August 12, 2015	4.8%	4.4%	5.9%	5.8%
10	August 13, 2015	4.6%	4.1%	4.7%	4.5%
11	August 19, 2015	4.5%	4.3%	6.0%	6.0%
12	August 20, 2015	4.2%	5.0%	5.7%	5.8%
13	August 26, 2015	3.9%	4.0%	4.9%	4.9%
14	August 27, 2015	4.0%	4.5%	5.6%	5.5%
15	September 2, 2015	4.2%	4.4%	5.4%	5.2%
16	September 3, 2015	4.4%	4.6%	6.0%	5.8%
17	September 9, 2015	4.6%	4.4%	5.7%	5.5%
18	September 10, 2015	5.0%	5.1%	6.0%	5.9%
19	September 16, 2015	3.5%	3.5%	5.4%	5.2%
20	September 17, 2015	4.2%	4.7%	4.9%	4.8%
Average		4.2%	4.4%	5.3%	5.3%

== Awards and nominations ==
Year	Award	Category	Recipient	Result
2015	29th KBS Drama Awards	Top Excellence Award, Actor	Jung Jae-young	Nominated
2015	29th KBS Drama Awards	Excellence Award, Actor in a Mid-length Drama	Jung Jae-young	Nominated
2015	29th KBS Drama Awards	Excellence Award, Actress in a Mid-length Drama	Song Yoon-ah	Nominated
2015	29th KBS Drama Awards	Best Supporting Actor	Jang Hyun-sung	Nominated
2015	29th KBS Drama Awards	Best Supporting Actress	Kim Seo-hyung	Won
2015	29th KBS Drama Awards	Best Young Actress	Kim Ji-min	Nominated

== Production ==
This is Jung Jae-young's first Korean drama series in his prolific career as a film and stage actor.

Prior to becoming a drama screenwriter, Jung Hyun-min worked for ten years as a political aide for a member of the National Assembly.
