= Secret Mother =

2018 South Korean television series

- Promotional poster
- Hangul: 시크릿 마더
- RR: Sikeurit madeo
- MR: Sik'ŭrit madŏ
- Genre: Mystery; Thriller
- Created by: Hong Chang-wook
- Written by: Hwang Ye-jin
- Directed by: Park Yong-soon
- Starring: Song Yoon-ah; Kim So-yeon; Kim Tae-woo; Song Jae-rim
- Composer: Jae Min-An
- Country of origin: South Korea
- Original language: Korean
- No. of episodes: 32 (Note: In order to circumvent Korean laws that prevent commercial breaks in the middle of an episode, what would previously have been aired as single 70 minute episodes are now being repackaged as two 35 minute episodes, with two episodes being shown each night with a commercial break between the two.)

Production
- Executive producer: Jo Eun-jung
- Producer: Park Hyeong-Ki
- Running time: 35 minutes
- Production company: The Story Works

Original release
- Network: SBS TV
- Release: May 12 – July 7, 2018

Secret Mother (Korean: 시크릿 마더; RR: Sikeurit madeo) is a 2018 South Korean television series starring Song Yoon-ah and Kim So-yeon with Kim Tae-woo and Song Jae-rim. The series aired four consecutive episodes on Saturday on SBS TV from 8:55 to 11:15 p.m. (KST) starting from May 12, 2018.

== Synopsis ==
Story of a mysterious surrogate mother who enters the home of a woman holding the secret behind her child's death.

== Cast ==
=== Main ===
- Song Yoon-ah as Kim Yoon-jin

An ex-psychiatrist who forgoes her job to become a full-time housewife after the death of her daughter. She was not only a successful doctor, but she became the head of the board of directors to her father's medical foundation. She is extremely dedicated to her son's education, and hires Kim Lisa to ensure her son's admission to a prestigious university.

- Kim So-yeon as Kim Eun-young (Lisa Kim)

A mysterious "surrogate mother" who oversees students' academic endeavors, and help them to achieve the path of an elite. In reality, she takes on the alias of "Kim Lisa" to find someone who was like a sister to her when they grew up in an orphanage.

- Kim Tae-woo as Han Jae-yeol

Kim Yoon-jin's husband. An elite police chief who graduated from the police academy with honors.

- Song Jae-rim as Ha Jung-wan

A homicide detective who is blunt and rash. He is the only person who believes in Kim Yoon-jin's doubts about her daughter's death and helps her find the truth behind it.

=== Supporting ===
- Cha Hwa-yeon as Park Sun-ja

Yoon-jin's mother-in-law. Director of a hospital.

- Seo Young-hee as Kang Hye-kyung.

A "Gangnam Mom" who is in constant pursuit of culture and perfection.

- Kim Jae-hwa as Myung Hwa-sook

A "Devil Mom" who only made it to Gangnam after hitting the jackpot with stocks, and whose goal is putting her child in an international school.

- Oh Yeon-ah as Song Ji-ae

A "Desire Mom" who outshines her own child, and wants to raise them to become the best in the world.

- Min Sung-wook as Jung Suk-hwan

A senior executive at a large company. Hye-kyung's husband.

- Ahn Sang-woo as Yoon Seung-soo

An officer at Ministry of Land Transportation, who quit his job to become a private investigator. Hwa-sook's ex-husband.

- Kim Byeong-ok as Lee Byung-hak

A renter who owns several buildings. Ji-ae's husband.

=== Extended ===
- Yum Ji-yoon as Han Joo-hee
- Kim Ye-jun as Han Min-joon, Yoon-jin's son
- Choi Yoo-ri as Jung Soo-min, Hye-kyung and Suk-hwan's daughter
- Song Ji-woo as Yoon Ji-ho, Hwa-sook and Seung-soo's son
- Lee Go-eun as Lee Chae-rin, Ji-ae and Byung-hak's daughter
- Son Seung-woo as Shin Se-yeon
- Kwon Do-kyun as Min Tae-hwan
- Kang Sang-won as Lee Chi-yeol
- Yeon Min-ji

== Original soundtrack ==
=== Part 1 ===
Released on May 12, 2018
No.	Title	Lyrics	Music	Artist	Length
1.	"Nothing"	Yoo Ji-hoon, Park Se-joon	Yoo Ji-hoon, Park Se-joon	Car, the garden (카더가든)	4:25
2.	"Nothing" (Inst.)				4:25
Total length:					8:50

=== Part 2 ===
Released on May 19, 2018
No.	Title	Artist	Length
1.	"완벽한 사랑" (Perfect Love)	Kim Sa-wol (김사월)	2:25
2.	"완벽한 사랑" (Inst.)		2:25
Total length:			4:50

=== Part 3 ===
Released on May 26, 2018
No.	Title	Artist	Length
1.	"보여" (See)	Ri-won (리원)	3:40
2.	"보여" (Inst.)		3:40
Total length:			7:20

=== Part 4 ===
Released on June 2, 2018
No.	Title	Artist	Length
1.	"낮과 밤" (Day and Night)	Kim Sa-wol (김사월)	3:20
2.	"낮과 밤" (Inst.)		3:20
Total length:			6:40

=== Part 5 ===
Released on June 9, 2018
No.	Title	Artist	Length
1.	"기억속의 너" (You In My Memory)	Goo Yoon-hoe (구윤회)	4:16
2.	"기억속의 너" (Inst.)		4:16
Total length:			8:32

=== Part 6 ===
Released on June 23, 2018
No.	Title	Artist	Length
1.	"Beside You"	Lee Hyuk (이혁)	4:45
2.	"Beside You" (Inst.)		4:45
Total length:			9:30

== Ratings ==
- In the table below, the blue numbers represent the lowest ratings and the red numbers represent the highest ratings.
- NR denotes that the drama did not rank in the top 20 daily programs on that date.
- TNmS stop publishing their report from June 2018.

Ep.	Original broadcast date	Average audience share			
Ep.	Original broadcast date	TNmS		AGB Nielsen	
Ep.	Original broadcast date	Nationwide	Seoul	Nationwide	Seoul
1	May 12, 2018	4.4% (NR)	4.6%	4.8% (NR)	5.0% (NR)
2	May 12, 2018	5.7% (NR)	6.3%	6.5% (17th)	7.1% (14th)
3	May 12, 2018	5.6% (NR)	6.1%	6.5% (17th)	7.0% (16th)
4	May 12, 2018	6.9% (17th)	7.7%	7.8% (10th)	8.6% (7th)
5	May 19, 2018	4.3% (NR)	5.1%	4.6% (NR)	5.4% (18th)
6	May 19, 2018	5.7% (16th)	6.6%	5.7% (16th)	6.5% (13th)
7	May 19, 2018	5.5% (19th)	6.4%	6.2% (15th)	7.2% (9th)
8	May 19, 2018	6.1% (14th)	6.8%	6.6% (13th)	7.3% (8th)
9	May 26, 2018	4.9% (NR)	5.1%	4.3% (NR)	4.5% (NR)
10	May 26, 2018	5.3% (NR)	5.6%	5.1% (NR)	5.4% (NR)
11	May 26, 2018	6.2% (17th)	6.5%	5.9% (18th)	6.2% (16th)
12	May 26, 2018	7.0% (11th)	7.6%	6.9% (10th)	7.4% (6th)
13	June 2, 2018	5.3% (20th)	5.9%	5.0% (NR)	5.6% (20th)
14	June 2, 2018	6.0% (19th)	6.4%	6.5% (17th)	6.9% (14th)
15	June 2, 2018	6.2% (18th)	6.6%	6.6% (15th)	7.0% (12th)
16	June 2, 2018	6.4% (17th)	6.8%	7.4% (8th)	7.5% (8th)
17	June 9, 2018	5.8% (NR)	6.4%	5.6% (NR)	6.2% (20th)
18	June 9, 2018	6.0% 20th)	7.1%	6.8% (15th)	7.9% (10th)
19	June 9, 2018	6.3% (19th)	7.4%	7.7% (10th)	8.8% (7th)
20	June 9, 2018	6.9% (13th)	7.6%	8.1% (9th)	8.8% (7th)
21	June 23, 2018	3.5%	3.7%	4.0% (NR)	4.2% (NR)
22	June 23, 2018	4.5%	4.7%	5.0% (NR)	5.3% (NR)
23	June 23, 2018	5.3%	5.5%	5.8% (NR)	6.0% (NR)
24	June 23, 2018	5.6%	5.8%	6.1% (20th)	6.1% (19th)
25	June 30, 2018	4.8% (NR)	5.0%	5.2% (NR)	5.4% (NR)
26	June 30, 2018	5.4% (NR)	5.6%	5.8% (NR)	6.0% (NR)
27	June 30, 2018	5.9% (NR)	6.1%	6.3% (19th)	6.9% (17th)
28	June 30, 2018	7.0% (19th)	7.6%	7.4% (15th)	8.0% (12th)
29	July 7, 2018	1.5%	1.7%	1.9% (NR)	2.2% (NR)
30	July 7, 2018	5.2%	5.8%	5.6% (NR)	6.1% (19th)
31	July 7, 2018	6.5%	7.2%	7.0% (14th)	7.7% (10th)
32	July 7, 2018	7.4%	8.1%	7.8% (8th)	8.3% (7th)
Average		5.6%	%	6.0%	6.5%

- Episodes 21-24 did not air on June 16 due to coverage of the 2018 FIFA World Cup Group D match between Argentina and Iceland.

== Awards and nominations ==
Year	Award	Category	Nominee	Result	Ref.
2018	SBS Drama Awards	Top Excellence Award, Actor in a Daily and Weekend Drama	Song Jae-rim	Nominated	
2018	SBS Drama Awards	Top Excellence Award, Actress in a Daily and Weekend Drama	Song Yoon-ah	Won	
2018	SBS Drama Awards	Excellence Award, Actor in a Daily and Weekend Drama	Kim Tae-woo	Nominated	
2018	SBS Drama Awards	Excellence Award, Actress in a Daily and Weekend Drama	Kim So-yeon	Won	
2018	SBS Drama Awards	Best Supporting Actress	Kim Jae-hwa	Nominated	
