= Lost in Love (film) =

- Theatrical release poster
- Directed by: Choo Chang-min
- Written by: Choo Chang-min
- Produced by: Baek Sun-hee
- Starring: Sul Kyung-gu; Song Yoon-ah
- Cinematography: Lee Ki-won
- Edited by: Kim Yong-su
- Music by: Jeong Dong-in
- Production company: Cinema Service
- Distributed by: Cinema Service
- Release date: January 26, 2006
- Running time: 118 minutes
- Country: South Korea
- Language: Korean

Lost in Love (Korean: 사랑을 놓치다; RR: Sarangeul notchida) is a 2006 South Korean romantic drama film directed by Choo Chang-min. Starring Sul Kyung-gu and Song Yoon-ah, it follows the emotional paths of two college friends over their ten years of friendship.

== Synopsis ==
Yeon-soo (Song Yoon-ah) and Woo-jae (Sul Kyung-gu) have been college and long time friends. Although Yeon-soo is secretly in love with Woo-jae, she is afraid to reveal it, and he is not attentive enough to sense it. When they meet again after ten years, however, Woo-jae has come to view their relationship differently.

== Cast ==
- Sul Kyung-gu as Woo-jae
- Song Yoon-ah as Yeon-soo
- Lee Ki-woo as Sang-sik
- Lee Hwi-hyang as Yeon-soo's mother
- Jang Hang-sun as Uncle
- Ko Kyu-pil as Chang-geun
