= Kim Sang-jin (film director) =

South Korean filmmaker (born 1967)

- Born: August 9, 1967 (age 59); South Korea
- Education: Hanyang University - Theater and Film
- Occupations: Film director; screenwriter; film producer
- Years active: 1989–present

Korean name
- Hangul: 김상진
- Hanja: 金相辰
- RR: Gim Sangjin
- MR: Kim Sangjin

Kim Sang-jin (born August 9, 1967) is a South Korean film director, screenwriter and producer. He directed the hit comedies Attack the Gas Station (1999), Kick the Moon (2001) and Jail Breakers (2002).

== Filmography ==
- Who Saw the Dragon's Claws? (1991) - assistant director
- Teenage Love Song (1991) - script editor, assistant director
- I Want to Live Just Until 20 Years Old (1992) - screenwriter, assistant director
- Life Isn't a Multiple Choice Test (1992) - actor
- Mister Mama (1992) - assistant director
- Two Cops (1993) - assistant director
- How to Top My Wife (1994) - screenwriter, assistant director
- Millions in My Account (1995) - director
- The Rules of a Gangster (1996) - director
- Two Cops 3 (1998) - director
- Attack the Gas Station (1999) - director
- Last Present (2001) - executive producer, actor
- Kick the Moon (2001) - director, actor
- Jail Breakers (2002) - director
- Spring Breeze (2003) - planner
- Ghost House (2004) - director
- Another Public Enemy (2005) - assistant editor
- King and the Clown (2005) - investor
- Lost in Love (2006) - investor
- Kidnapping Granny K (2007) - director, executive producer
- Attack the Gas Station 2 (2010) - director, actor
- Pitch High (2011) - director, executive producer
- Three Summer Nights (2015) - director
