= Choo Chang-min =

South Korean film director and screenwriter

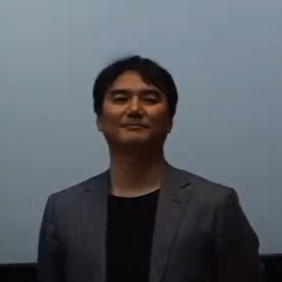
- Choo in March 2018
- Born: 1966 (age 59–60); South Korea
- Occupations: Film director, screenwriter

Korean name
- Hangul: 추창민
- RR: Chu Changmin
- MR: Ch'u Ch'angmin

Choo Chang-min (Korean: 추창민; born 1966) is a South Korean film director and screenwriter. His 2012 period film Masquerade became one of the top-grossing Korean films of all time.

== Career ==
Choo Chang-min began his career as an assistant director on such films as City of the Rising Sun (1999) and The Happy Funeral Director (2000). His first short film, The End of April (2000), was highly acclaimed at several international film festivals. Choo made his feature film debut with hit comedy Mapado: Island of Fortunes (2005).

Choo then directed the Sul Kyung-gu-Song Yun-ah melodrama Lost in Love (2006), followed by the senior citizen romance Late Blossom (2011) which became a sleeper hit through word of mouth after it was released. His period film Masquerade (2012) was a huge critical and commercial success, for which Choo won Best Director at the prestigious Grand Bell Awards and the Baeksang Arts Awards.

== Filmography ==
- Land of Happiness (2024) - director
- Seven Years of Night (2018) - director, screenwriter
- Masquerade (2012) - director
- Late Blossom (2011) - director, screenplay, editor
- Lost in Love (2006) - director, screenplay
- Mapado (2005) - director
- The End of April (short film, 2000) - director, screenplay, producer
- The Happy Funeral Director (2000) - assistant director
- City of the Rising Sun (1999) - assistant director

== Awards and nominations ==
Year	Award	Category	Recipient	Result
2012	49th Grand Bell Awards	Best Film	Masquerade	Won
2012	49th Grand Bell Awards	Best Director	Masquerade	Won
2012	33rd Blue Dragon Film Awards	Best Film	Masquerade	Nominated
2012	33rd Blue Dragon Film Awards	Best Director	Masquerade	Nominated
2013	49th Baeksang Arts Awards	Best Film	Masquerade	Won
2013	49th Baeksang Arts Awards	Best Director	Masquerade	Won
2013	22nd Buil Film Awards	Best Film	Masquerade	Nominated
2013	22nd Buil Film Awards	Best Director	Masquerade	Nominated
