= Mackerel Run =

2007 South Korean television series

- Also known as: Run! Mackerel; Go Mackerel
- Genre: Comedy; Drama; High school
- Written by: Baek Ji-hyun; Park Jae-hyun
- Directed by: Kim Yong-jae; Choi Young-hoon; Kim Hong-seon
- Starring: Lee Min-ho; Moon Chae-won; Kwon Se-in; Jung Yoon-jo; Go Kyu-pil; Jang Tae-hoon
- Country of origin: South Korea
- Original language: Korean
- No. of episodes: 8

Production
- Producer: Ha Seung-bo
- Production location: Korea
- Running time: 50 minutes
- Production companies: Lee Ki-jin Media; Jellybox

Original release
- Network: Seoul Broadcasting System
- Release: 12 May – 30 June 2007

Mackerel Run (Korean: 달려라 고등어; RR: Dallyeora godeungeo) is a 2007 South Korean television series that aired on SBS from May 12 to June 30, 2007 on Saturdays at 16:40 (KST) for 8 episodes.

The high school sitcom was originally planned as a 24-episode series, but low viewership ratings in the 3-4% range led to its early cancellation.

After cast members Lee Min-ho (Boys Over Flowers), Moon Chae-won (Painter of the Wind), and Park Bo-young (Scandal Makers) rose to fame in 2008–2009, cable network tvN aired reruns of the show at 11:00 (KST) beginning February 28, 2009.

Lee, Moon and Park would later work together again in the 2008 comedy film Our School's E.T.; they were cast because director Park Kwang-chun had reportedly enjoyed watching Mackerel Run.

== Synopsis ==
Cha Gong-chan (Lee Min-ho) was able to enter the top private high school in the affluent Gangnam District, Myoung-mun High, because of his soccer skills. But when he quits the sport, he finds himself an outcast and starts cutting class. One day, a beautiful new girl transfers to the school, and when she walks into his class, Gong-chan falls for her instantly. He is finally enthusiastic about going to school, but the school administrator informs him that he will be expelled if he misses one more day. Gong-chan vows that he won't give up on either his school life or his love.

== Cast ==
=== Main ===
- Lee Min-ho as Cha Gong-chan
- Moon Chae-won as Min Yoon-seo
- Kwon Se-in as Baek Heon
- Jung Yoon-jo as Yoon Sae-mi
- Ko Kyu-pil as Jang Dong-gun
- Jang Tae-hoon as Go Bong-tae

=== Supporting ===
- Lee Byung-joon as Ma Do-shik, school administrator
- Yoo Hye-ri as Heo Young-sook, Yoon-seo's mother
- Lee Bong-gyu as Min Joo-hwa, Yoon-seo's father
- Lee Kyung-jin as Lee Geum-ja, Gong-chan's mother
- Park Bo-young as Shim Chung-ah
- -- as Ahn Kyung-tae
- -- as Kim Doo-son
- -- as Yoon Taek-han
- Min Ji-hyun as Ki Yeo-woon
- Kim Joo-young as Go Kwi-dong
- Na Seok-min
- Kim Gook-bin
- Kang Hyun-jung as Kyung-hwa
- Kang Soo-min
- Choi Myung-kyung

== Popular culture ==
A song from this series titled Summer Sunshine (also known as Dallyora Kudongo) was covered by singer Holly Lindin for the 2010 CGI animated film Barbie in a Mermaid Tale. It plays during the beginning of the film.
