= Kim Ki-bang =

South Korean actor

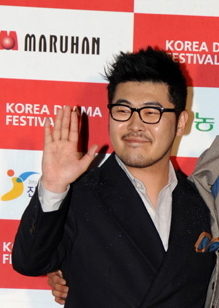
- Kim in 2010
- Born: May 31, 1981 (age 45); South Korea
- Occupation: Actor
- Years active: 2005–present
- Agent: FL ENT(에프엘이엔티)
- Spouse: Kim Hee-kyung (m. 2017)

Korean name
- Hangul: 김기방
- Hanja: 金基邦
- RR: Gim Gibang
- MR: Kim Kibang

Kim Ki-bang (born May 31, 1981) is a South Korean actor. Since his acting debut in 2005, Kim has played supporting roles in television dramas such as Boys Over Flowers (2009), Golden Time (2012), Gu Family Book (2013), Medical Top Team (2013), My Lovely Girl (2014), and Heart to Heart (2015). He played his first leading role in the film Geochang Massacre - Bloody Winter (2013).

== Personal life ==
On June 22, 2017, Kim's agency, Mystic Entertainment, announced that he will get married with Kim Hee-kyung, South Korean cosmetic brand Ground Plan's vice president. The wedding ceremony was held in Hannam-dong, Yongsan, Seoul on September 30, 2017.

== Filmography ==
=== Film ===
Year	Title	Role
2005	She's on Duty	Pippopneun gang member
2006	Three Fellas	High school student 4
2008	Girl Scout	Public worker
2008	Our School's E.T.	Meok-tong
2008	Scandal Makers	PD
2008	A Frozen Flower	Byeok-ran-do store owner
2009	Paradise	Clerk
2011	White: The Melody of the Curse	Manager
2012	Almost Che	Bong-soo
2013	Behind the Camera	
2013	Queen of the Night	Jong-bae
2013	Geochang Massacre - Bloody Winter	PD Cha Dong-seok

=== Television series ===
Year	Title	Role
2005	My Lovely Sam Soon	Ki-bang
2006	Lovers	
2007	Thank You	Song Doo-seob
2007	Kimchi Cheese Smile	Engineer Jung
2007	New Heart	Lee Dong-gwon's manager
2008	Seo-young's Spy	Kim Ki-bang
2008	The Art of Seduction	
2008	Life Special Investigation Team	Lee Soo-hyung (guest, episode 5)
2008	Fantastic and Strange Stories	
2009	Boys Over Flowers	Bom Choon-sik
2009	Strange Stories and Legends 2: "Gooseflesh"	Director Na
2009	Will It Snow for Christmas?	Cha Bu-san
2010	Becoming a Billionaire	Park Kang-woo
2011	The Duo	Gom-chi
2011	Deep Rooted Tree	Cho-tak
2012	Golden Time	Kim Do-hyeong
2013	Gu Family Book	Eok-man
2013	Medical Top Team	Jung Hoon-min
2014	KBS Drama Special: "Illegal Parking"	Client (cameo)
2014	My Lovely Girl	Yoo Sang-bong
2014	Misaeng: Incomplete Life	One International employee (cameo)
2014	Drama Festival: "4teen"	
2015	Heart to Heart	Detective Yang
2015	Splendid Politics	Gu-bok
2016	Cheese in the Trap	Gong Ju-yong
2016	Uncontrollably Fond	No Eul's boss
2016	Entourage	Cameo
2018	Should We Kiss First?	Lee Chung-geol
2021	Moonshine	Chun-gae

=== Web series ===
Year	Title	Role	Ref.
2022	X of Crisis	Myung-soo	

=== Variety show ===
Year	Title	Notes/Ref.
2015	Law of the Jungle in Nicaragua	Cast member (Episodes 184–185)
2023	GBRB Reap What You Sow	Cast Member

=== Music video appearances ===
Year	Song title	Artist
2006	"When a Man Loves a Woman"	Lee Seung-gi
2007	"White Lie"	Lee Seung-gi

== Theater ==
Year	Title	Role
2012	The 1st Shop of Coffee Prince	Jin Ha-rim
