= Lee Ah-jin =

South Korean actress, and model (born 1991)

- Born: Choi Ah-jin; February 4, 1991 (age 35); Daegu, South Korea
- Occupations: Actress; model
- Years active: 2003–present
- Height: 1.62 m (5 ft 4 in)

Korean name
- Hangul: 이아진
- Hanja: 李雅真
- RR: I Ajin
- MR: I Ajin

Lee Ah-jin (Korean: 이아진, born February 4, 1991) is a South Korean actress, and model. She is best known for her leading roles in Assorted Gems (2009) and Death Bell 2 (2010).

== Career ==
Lee began her activities in 2003 with a television program.

In 2008, she starred in her first television film Get Up with Lee Min-ho, and film A Light Sleep as Yeol Lin. In 2009, she received "Young Korean Star" award.

In 2014, she moderated Baseball Tournament at Suwon, Gyeonggi Province.

== Filmography ==
Year	Title	Role	Other notes	Ref.
2008	Get Up	Joo-won	Television Film	
2008	Da Capo	Supporting Role	Korean version	
2010	Death Bell 2	Ji Yoon	Korean version	

=== Television ===
Year	Title	Role	Network	Ref.
2008	A Light Sleep	Yeol Lin	MBC	
2008	My Precious You	Mi Ri	KBS	
2009	Assorted Gems	Seo Kkeut Soon	MBC	
2010	Kim Su-ro, The Iron King	Beo Deul	MBC	
2011–2012	Vampire Prosecutor	-	OCN	
2012	Operation Proposal	-	Fuji TV	
2016	The Vampire Detective	Mi So	OCN	
2017	Man to Man	-	JTBC	
2019	Doctor John	-	JTBC	
2023	The Good Bad Mother	-	JTBC	

=== Music video appearances ===
Year	Song title	Artist	Role	Ref.
2010	"I need your love" MV	PK Heman	Lead Female Character	
2013	"U Who?" MV	Yoo Seung-woo	Lead Female Character	
2014	"Just The Way You Are" MV	Jung Joon-young feat Younha	Lead young Female Character	

== Awards ==
- 2009 - The 2nd Korea Junior Star Awards Movie Rookie Division.
