= Madeleine (2003 film) =

- Theatrical release poster
- Hangul: 마들렌
- RR: Madeulren
- MR: Madŭllen
- Directed by: Park Kwang-chun
- Written by: Seol Jun-seok; Kim Eun-jung; Park Kwang-chun
- Produced by: Seo Woo-sik; Choi Yoon; Choi Jae-won
- Starring: Zo In-sung; Shin Min-a
- Cinematography: Kim Young-chul
- Edited by: Park Gok-ji; Jung Jin-hee
- Music by: Michael Staudacher
- Distributed by: Cinema Service
- Release date: January 10, 2003
- Running time: 119 minutes
- Country: South Korea
- Language: Korean
- Box office: $2.1 million

Madeleine (Korean: 마들렌) is a 2003 South Korean romantic drama film starring Zo In-sung and Shin Min-ah in lead roles, directed by Park Kwang-chun. The film was released on January 10, 2003, in South Korean cinemas and drew a total of 146,482 admissions in the nation's capital of Seoul.

== Plot ==
Ji-suk is a Korean Language & Literature major who dreams of becoming a writer, and delivers newspapers part-time. When he goes to a hair salon to have his long hair cut, a charming woman calls him by name. She is none other than Hee-jin, his classmate in junior high school. Dreaming of becoming a hair designer, Hee-jin is a senior hair designer at the salon despite her young age. They are both drawn to each other, Ji-suk to Hee-jin's beauty, and Hee-jin to Ji-suk's purity. Their paths cross by chance a few more times and the two grow closer. Finally, Hee-jin suggests a 'one-month romance.' "Neither one of us can say 'Let's break up' before the month is up! After a month, we part ways grandly! What do you think? Fun, huh?" Ji-suk is caught off guard. Seeing this, Hee-jin smiles at him sweetly...

Ji-suk who ponders over everything seriously. Hee-jin who is filled with cheerful playfulness. They have 0% in common but together, they learn of a new world unfamiliar to them. Their romance is more splendid than they expected. But one day, Ji-suk's first love, Sung-hae, shows up. Majoring in film, Sung-hae is the lead singer of a band and very cool. Hee-jin gets jealous over Sung-hae and starts to fight with Ji-suk. It is the first time they argue since their month of romance began. And to make matters worse, Hee-jin is faced with an enormous decision... Also Hee-jin found that she is pregnant with her ex-boyfriend's child and wants to keep the child. That causes Hee jin to tell Ji suk that Sung hae also loved him during their junior years. However Ji suk don't give up on Hee jin and helps her during the difficult times leading them to have a happy life together.

== Cast ==
- Zo In-sung as Ji-suk
- Shin Min-a as Hee-jin
- Park Jung-ah as Sung-hae
- Kim Soo-ro as Mah-ho
- Kang Rae-yeon as Yoo-hung
- Ha Jung-woo as Joon-ho
- Lee Mi-young as Hee-jin's mother
- Choi Kyu-hwan
- Kim Ho-jin
- Hong Ji-min
- Park Hyeon-suk
- Kim Jin-hyeok
- Song Chae-min
- Hahm Eun-jung

== Reception ==
=== Accolades ===
Year	Award	Category	Recipient	Result	Ref
2003	New York Korean Film Festival	Nominee	Madeleine	Nominated	
2003	41st Grand Bell Awards	best music	Michael Staudacher	Won	
