= Vampire Cop Ricky =

- Theatrical poster
- Hangul: 흡혈 형사 나도열
- Hanja: 吸血 刑事 나도열
- RR: Heuphyeol hyeongsa Na Doyeol
- MR: Hŭphyŏl hyŏngsa Na Toyŏl
- Directed by: Lee Si-myung
- Written by: Kim Se-gyeom; Jeon Soon-wook; Namgung Kyun; Kim Soo-yeong
- Produced by: Choi Yong-bae; Lee Si-myung; Kim Ik-sang
- Starring: Kim Soo-ro; Cho Yeo-jeong
- Cinematography: Jeon Dae-seong
- Edited by: Kyung Min-ho
- Music by: Lee Dong-joon
- Distributed by: Showbox
- Release date: February 9, 2006
- Running time: 110 minutes
- Country: South Korea
- Language: Korean
- Box office: $ 10,671,848

Vampire Cop Ricky (Korean: 흡혈 형사 나도열) is a 2006 South Korean film.

== Plot ==
A mosquito from Transylvania finds its way to Seoul where it bites Na Do-yol, a corrupt police officer. Soon after he begins to develop a thirst for blood, and finds out that he has vampire super powers whenever he becomes sexually aroused. When Do-yol's past misdeeds come back to threaten his partner and girlfriend, he decides to clean up his act and sets out for revenge.

== Cast ==
- Kim Soo-ro as Na Do-yol
- Cho Yeo-jeong
- Chun Ho-jin
- Son Byong-ho as Tak Moon-su
- Oh Kwang-rok as Vampire Hunter
- Kim Goo-taek
- Lee Sang-hong
- Oh Soon-tae

== Release ==
Vampire Cop Ricky was released in South Korea on 9 February 2006, and on its opening weekend topped the box office with 492,272 admissions. The film went on to receive a total of 1,858,668 admissions nationwide, with a gross (as of 12 March 2006) of $10,671,848.

== See also ==
- Vampire film
