= Fengshui (2018 film) =

- Official release poster
- Hangul: 명당
- Hanja: 明堂
- RR: Myeongdang
- MR: Myŏngdang
- Directed by: Park Hee-gon
- Screenplay by: Jung Ja-young
- Produced by: Lee Kang-jin
- Starring: Cho Seung-woo; Ji Sung; Kim Sung-kyun; Moon Chae-won; Yoo Jae-myung; Baek Yoon-sik
- Cinematography: Baek Yoon-seok; Lee Ji-hoon
- Edited by: Kim Chang-ju
- Music by: Jang Young-gyu
- Production company: Jupiter Film
- Distributed by: Megabox Plus M
- Release date: September 19, 2018
- Running time: 126 minutes
- Country: South Korea
- Language: Korean
- Budget: ₩10 billion
- Box office: US$16 million

Fengshui (also referred as Feng Shui or Grave Site) is a 2018 South Korean period action drama film directed by Park Hee-gon. It stars Cho Seung-woo, Ji Sung, Kim Sung-kyun, Moon Chae-won, Yoo Jae-myung and Baek Yoon-sik. The film tells the story of a pungsu expert, Park Jae-sang, who can determine the land that bring good fortune and people around him who compete to occupy the land in order to change their fate and become king.

The film is the third and final installment of Jupiter Film's three-part film project on the Korean fortune-telling traditions, following The Face Reader (2013) and The Princess and the Matchmaker (2018). It was released in South Korea on September 19, 2018.

== Premise ==
A period drama about those who struggle to become king and fight over grave sites and a young man who lost his parents attempting to take revenge on the king.

== Cast ==
=== Main ===
- Cho Seung-woo as Park Jae-sang
- Ji Sung as Heung-sun
- Kim Sung-kyun as Kim Byung-ki
- Moon Chae-won as Cho-sun
- Yoo Jae-myung as Goo Yong-sik
- Baek Yoon-sik as Kim Jwa-geun

=== Supporting ===
- Lee Won-geun as Hun-jong
- Park Choong-sun as Jung Man-in
- Kang Tae-oh as Won-kyung
- Tae In-ho as Chun Hee-yeon
- Jo Hyun-sik as Jang Soon-kyu
- Jung Jae-heon as Ahn Pil-joo
- Jeon Shin-hwan as Ha Jung-il
- Kim Min-jae as Crown Prince Hyomyeong
- Heo Sung-tae as Lee Si-young
- Son Byong-ho as Kim Yoon-cheol
- Yang Dong-geun as Lady Nam's husband
- Jo Bok-rae as Bbeokkuki

== Production ==
Principal photography began on August 22, 2017. Production ended on January 5, 2018. Filming take place in Hadong, Gyeongnam-do.

== Release ==
The film premiered in South Korea on September 19, 2018, with age 12-rating. The film was released alongside The Great Battle, The Negotiation, and The Nun, which considered as the most competitive week on Korean Box Office this year. In North America, the film was released in limited theaters on September 21, 2018.

The film has been selected to screen at the Spotlight on Korea section of the 38th Hawaii International Film Festival in November 2018.

The film was released in VOD services and digital download on October 15, 2018.

== Reception ==
=== Critical response ===
The film received mixed reviews. Praise was given to the acting performances (particularly by Cho Seung-woo, Baek Yoon-sik, and Ji Sung), and cinematography. Most criticisms centered on how the film failed to become a gripping political period-drama despite its solid cast, and some weak performances (particularly by Ji Sung and Lee Won-geun).

Yoon Min-sik from The Korea Herald wrote, "Director Park does a passable job of keeping up the suspense with intriguing characters and depiction of the peril at hand, although this is not an immensely difficult task with the abundance of quality actors. Cho is good as usual, and Baek's steady tone and solemn look reek of charisma. However, the film relies too much on luck, guesswork and brute force to appeal as a political drama."

Woo Jae-yeon from Yonhap News Agency wrote, "Despite the compelling story peppered with twists and stellar performances by Cho Seung-woo, Ji Sung and Baek Yoon-sik, one might leave the theater, feeling the business is unsolved and more stories are left to be told...[however] the filming locations, boosted by the excellent work of the cinematography, is quite breathtaking and fascinating."

=== Box office ===
The film earned US$78,146 from previews and pre-sales.

On its opening day, the film attracted 108,832 moviegoers and grossed US$778,024, finished second behind The Great Battle which released on the same day. During its opening weekend, the film finished in second place with US$4.5 million gross from 548,989 attendance, tailing The Great Battle in the lead. After 6 days of screening, the film surpassed 1 million admissions on September 24, 2018.

The film dropped to third place during its second weekend with US$1.9 million gross from 240,449 attendance, 58% lower gross compared to its debut weekend. On October 2, the film surpassed 2 million admissions. During its third weekend, the film dropped to seventh place with US$141,921 gross from 19,969 attendance, 92% lower gross compared to its second weekend.

As of October 30, 2018, the film attracted 2,084,811 moviegoers with US$15.8 million gross.
