= Lee Min-ho =

South Korean actor (born 1987)

- Lee in 2026
- Born: June 22, 1987 (age 39); Seoul, South Korea
- Education: Konkuk University
- Occupations: Actor; singer
- Years active: 2002–present
- Agent: MYM Entertainment
- Height: 187 cm (6 ft 2 in)

Korean name
- Hangul: 이민호
- RR: I Minho
- MR: I Minho
- Website: leeminho.kr

Signature
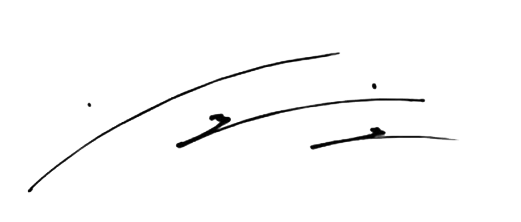

Lee Min-ho (Korean: 이민호, born June 22, 1987) is a South Korean actor and singer. He gained widespread fame with his role as Gu Jun-pyo in the television series Boys Over Flowers (2009), which also earned him the Baeksang Arts Award for Best New Actor. His other notable works are television series City Hunter (2011), The Heirs (2013), The Legend of the Blue Sea (2016), and The King: Eternal Monarch (2020), as well as the action thriller film Gangnam Blues (2015). In 2022, he starred in the Apple TV+ period drama Pachinko based on the novel of the same name.

The success of Lee's television career established him as a top hallyu star. He became the first Korean celebrity to have a wax figure made in his image at Madame Tussauds, with figures being unveiled in Shanghai in 2013, and Hong Kong in 2014.

== Early life and education ==
Lee Min-ho was born on June 22, 1987, in Heukseok-dong, Dongjak District, Seoul. Raised by Buddhist parents, he is the younger one of two children. During childhood, Lee initially hoped to become a professional football player. While attending Namseong Elementary School, he was selected for the junior football class of manager and ex-professional player Cha Bum-kun. However, an injury during fifth grade put an end to his aspiration. In a 2009 interview with the Asia Business Daily, he recalled that during elementary school other pupils nicknamed him kkamdungi (깜둥이; lit. ''darkie'') in reference to his tan skin. Other nicknames were 'skeleton' from his time at Banpo Middle School and 'demon' in high school—the former stemmed from the thought that he was "too skinny" whereas the latter nickname was what his "playful" personality earned him.

By his first year at Danggok High School, Lee had already turned his interests to acting and modeling. After he posed for a few magazines, he met the future president of Starhaus Entertainment by chance. His professional acting career began after the encounter, and he would ultimately sign with the agency in 2005. In 2006, Lee enrolled at Konkuk University's College of Art and Design; he has since obtained a bachelor's degree after majoring in Film Arts. As of 2020 he was pursuing his master's degree in Film at Kookmin University Graduate School.

== Career ==
=== 2002–2008: Beginnings ===
Lee started auditioning and landed minor roles in several television shows such as Romance (2002), Nonstop (2000–2006) and Recipe of Love (2005). His official debut (main) role was in the EBS series Secret Campus (2006). Early in his career, Lee went by the stage name Lee Min because his agency thought his birth name was too ordinary. However, as his stage name was pronounced and written in the same way as the Korean word "imin", which means "immigration", he later said it was difficult to find himself in internet search results. He eventually went back to using his original name.

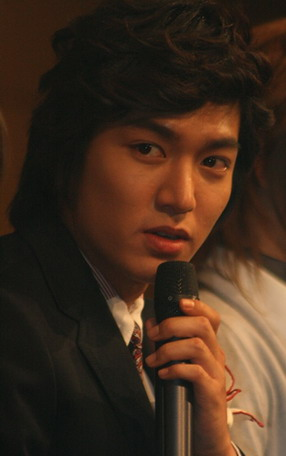
Lee at the Boys Over Flowers press conference in 2008

In 2006, his acting career was put on hold for a year following a serious car wreck, which occurred while riding in the back of a car with fellow actor Jung Il-woo. Their two friends riding in the front seat were killed instantly. Lee was severely injured and spent several months bedridden. Upon recovery, Lee received his first leading role in the high-school drama Mackerel Run (2007), but the series was reduced to only eight episodes due to low viewership ratings.

In 2008, he appeared in television dramas Get Up and I Am Sam, as well as movies Public Enemy Returns and Our School's E.T.. During the filming of the latter, he became good friends with actor Kim Su-ro. Kim later gave him praise on a variety show: "I recognize a star when I see one. When I was doing Our School's E.T., I knew that Lee Min-ho would become one of the top actors in the country".

=== 2009–2010: Breakthrough ===
Lee's breakthrough came in 2009 with the lead role of Gu Jun-pyo in KBS2' Boys Over Flowers, the Korean adaptation of the popular shōjo manga of the same name. Competition for the role was intense and Lee only found out that he had been cast through newspaper articles. The series attracted high viewership ratings and buzz in South Korea during its broadcast. Lee's new-found popularity gained him many endorsement deals; Boys Over Flowers also created another Korean Wave throughout Asia and made Lee a hallyu star.

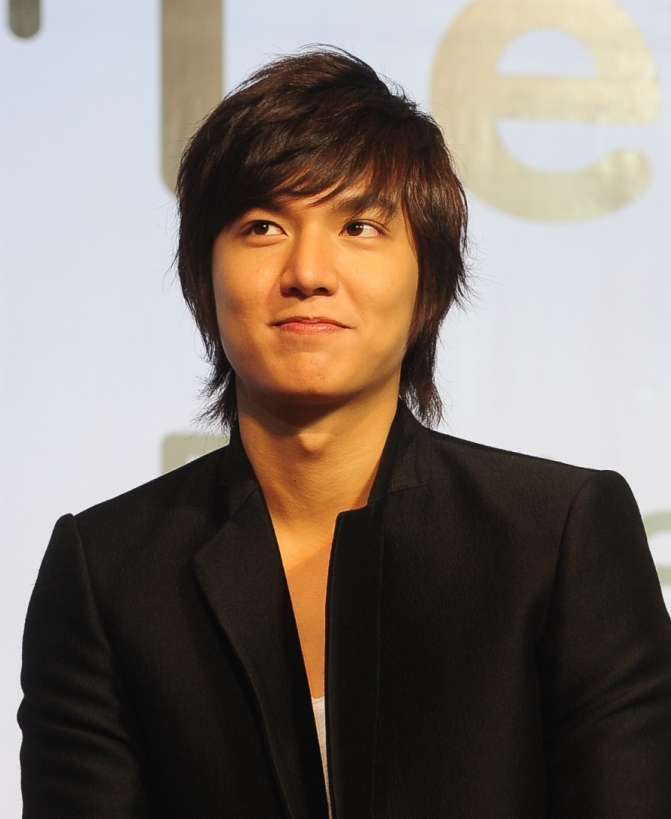
Lee in 2010

In 2010, Lee appeared in the romantic comedy Personal Taste opposite Son Ye-jin; he played a young architect who poses as a gay man in order to become roommates with a young woman, leading to romantic complications. When asked about the reason for choosing the role during an interview, he responded: "I think I would do a better job playing heavy and more defined roles when I am older. I think Personal Taste was perfect because it is bright, cheerful but you can also laugh and cry over it as well."

=== 2011–2013: International popularity ===
In 2011, he took on the role of the titular character in action drama City Hunter as Lee Yun-Seong, which was loosely based on Tsukasa Hojo's popular manga of the same name. The series was a commercial success and contributed to Lee's growing popularity, most notably in Japan, Philippines, China, and in France. He participated in the popular Chinese variety show Happy Camp in December 2011.

In 2012, Lee starred in the medical fusion sageuk Faith alongside Kim Hee-sun. Despite garnering viewership ratings in the 10% range, the drama was a commercial failure due to its high budget. In April 2013, Lee's wax figure was unveiled at the Madame Tussauds Shanghai. He then released his first album "My Everything" in May 2013. Lee also announced his return to television with a new series titled The Heirs, a teen drama written by Kim Eun-sook. On why he decided to take on the role of a chaebol heir in high school four years after playing one in Boys Over Flowers, he answered: "Before I grew past my 20s, I wanted to play a more upbeat character, one that would allow me to return to that feeling of simple, uncomplicated innocence that I had when I was younger." Premiering on October 9, 2013, The Heirs enjoyed immense popularity both locally, with a peak rating of 28.6%, and internationally, having over one billion hits on the Chinese streaming service IQIYI. Lee experienced a further increase in his global popularity as his character of Kim Tan.

=== 2014–2017: Continued success and return to films ===
In January 2014, a second wax figure of Lee was unveiled at Madame Tussauds Hong Kong. On January 30, Lee became the first Korean celebrity to perform on China's CCTV Lunar New Year Gala. He sang a song with Harlem Yu, the original singer of the theme song of Meteor Garden, the Taiwanese version of Boys Over Flowers. He was also invited to the third conference of the South Korean Presidential Committee for Cultural Enrichment as the representative for the entertainment industry, to share and contribute to the discussion of issues related to developing Korea's cultural content. Lee received the Prime Minister's Commendation at the 5th Korean Popular Culture and Arts Awards for his contribution to Koren Wave.

Lee subsequently recorded and released his second EP "Song for You" in October 2014 under Universal Music. As with his previous album, he stated that the tracks were recorded for his fans and that he had no ambition to pursue a singing career. He then took on Yoo Ha's neo-noir action saga Gangnam Blues (2015), set in the 1970s when the real estate development boom swept across the Gangnam area. The film, which co-starred Kim Rae-won, marked Lee's first leading role on the big screen.

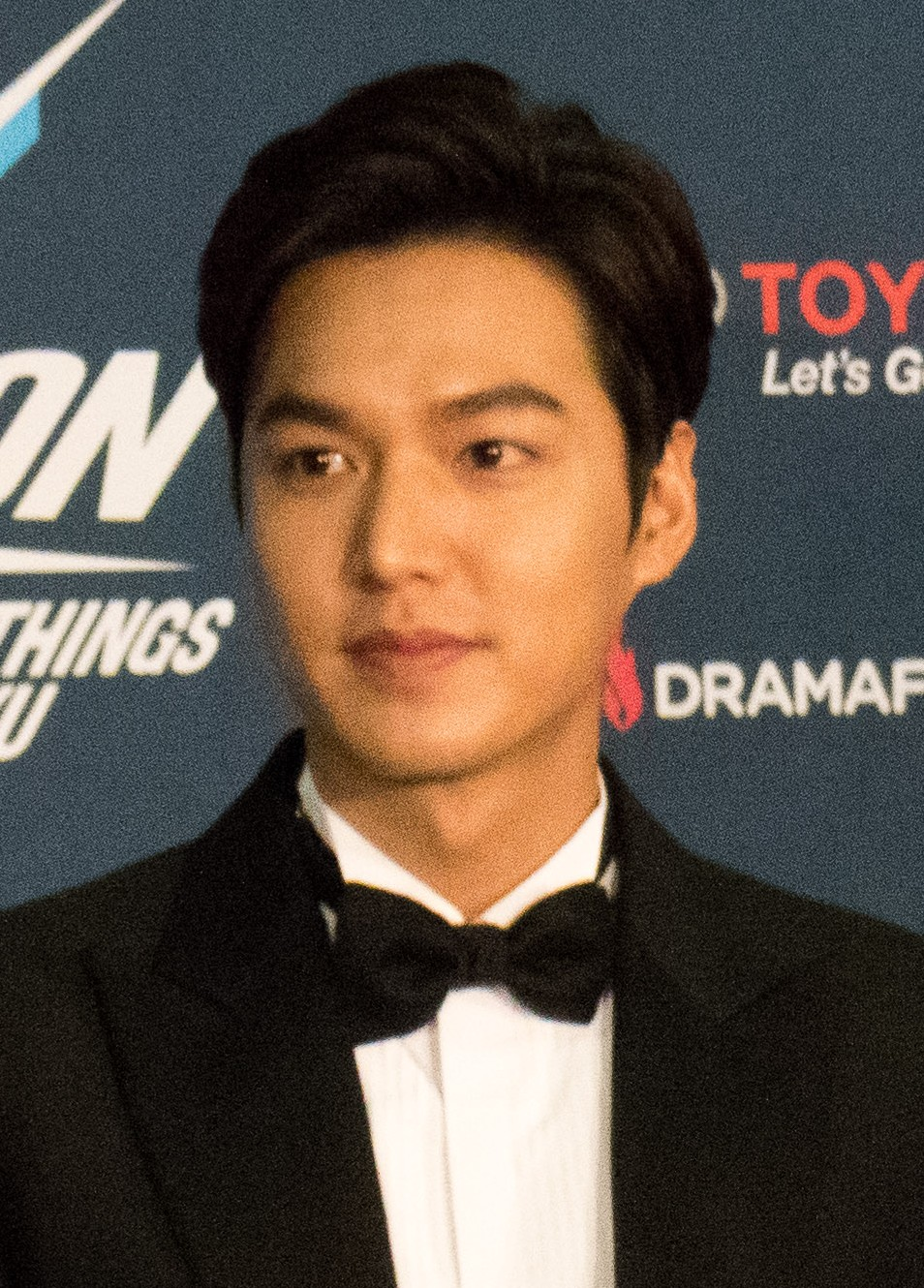
Lee in 2016

In 2016, Lee appeared in the action comedy film Bounty Hunters, directed by Shin Terra; his co-stars were Wallace Chung, Tiffany Tang, Jeremy Tsui, Karena Ng and Louis Fan. The flick topped box office charts upon its release and went on to gross US$31 million in China. Later that year, Lee made his television comeback in the fantasy romance as Hae Joon Jae The Legend of the Blue Sea alongside actress Jun Ji-hyun, which was another success. Lee began his mandatory military service on May 12, 2017 and was discharged on April 25, 2019 as a public service officer.

=== 2019–present: Comeback from military service and Hollywood debut ===
In 2019, Lee was cast in the SBS-broadcast and Netflix-distributed fantasy romance The King: Eternal Monarch written by The Heirs screenwriter Kim Eun-sook. It was hailed as one of the most anticipated series of the first half of 2020, serving as Lee's comeback following his release from mandatory military service as Lee Gun. The series set a record for SBS's highest 2020 Friday-Saturday drama premiere ratings and maintaining the No.1 spot on the weekly Wavve drama chart for eight consecutive weeks, but received mixed reviews and lower-than-expected domestic TV viewership ratings on later episodes compared to previous works by Kim Eun-sook. The King: Eternal Monarch was listed as the most popular Korean drama on Netflix in India, Malaysia, Philippines and Singapore and one of the top two in the U.S. in 2020.

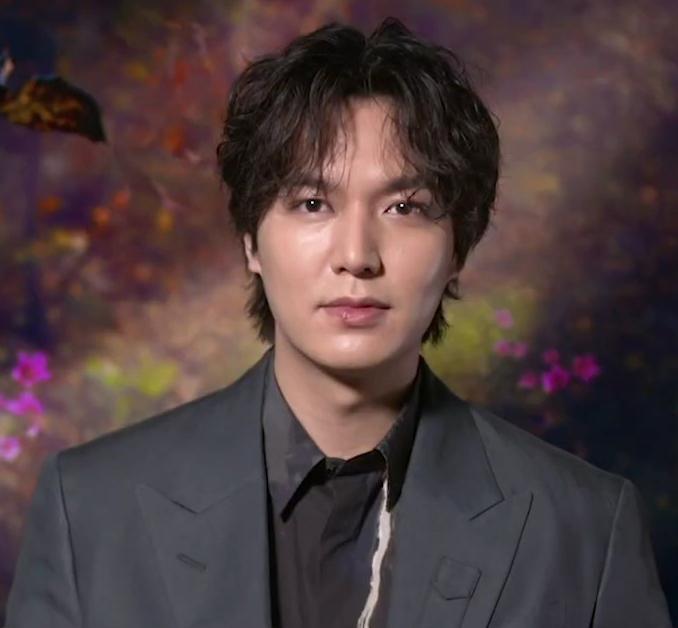
Lee in 2022

In October 2020, Lee Min-ho launched the YouTube channel "leeminho film" where he serves as executive producer and creative director. In 2022, Lee made his Hollywood debut in a main role as Koh Hansu, a mysterious merchant, in the television series adaptation of Min Jin Lee's novel Pachinko. The series received positive reviews and extensive critical acclaim upon release. Lee's performance, particularly in the standalone episode of the series, Chapter 7, which centered around Lee's character, received critical acclaim; outlets such as Rolling Stone, The New York Times, and Collider included the episode in their list of Best TV Episodes of 2022. In August 2023, Hugo Boss launched a new collection, featuring Lee, Patrick Mahomes, Naomi Campbell, Matteo Berrettini, and Suki Waterhouse in its campaign.

== Public image ==
As of October 2020, Lee has over 3 million followers on Twitter, 23 million followers on Weibo and was the first Korean celebrity to garner 20 million followers on both Instagram and Facebook. In 2014 and 2015, Lee topped the online poll organized by a Chinese entertainment magazine and was voted as the "Asian Male God". In 2017, Lee was chosen as the "Most Favoured Korean Actor" by fans of the Korean Wave in the United States. With a combined total of 65 million followers, he is referred to as the "King of Social Media".

== Other ventures ==
=== Ambassadorship ===
In January 2012, Lee was appointed as an honorary prosecutor by the Supreme Prosecutors' Office for building social reputation and trust with the public, alongside Moon Chae-won.

=== Endorsements ===
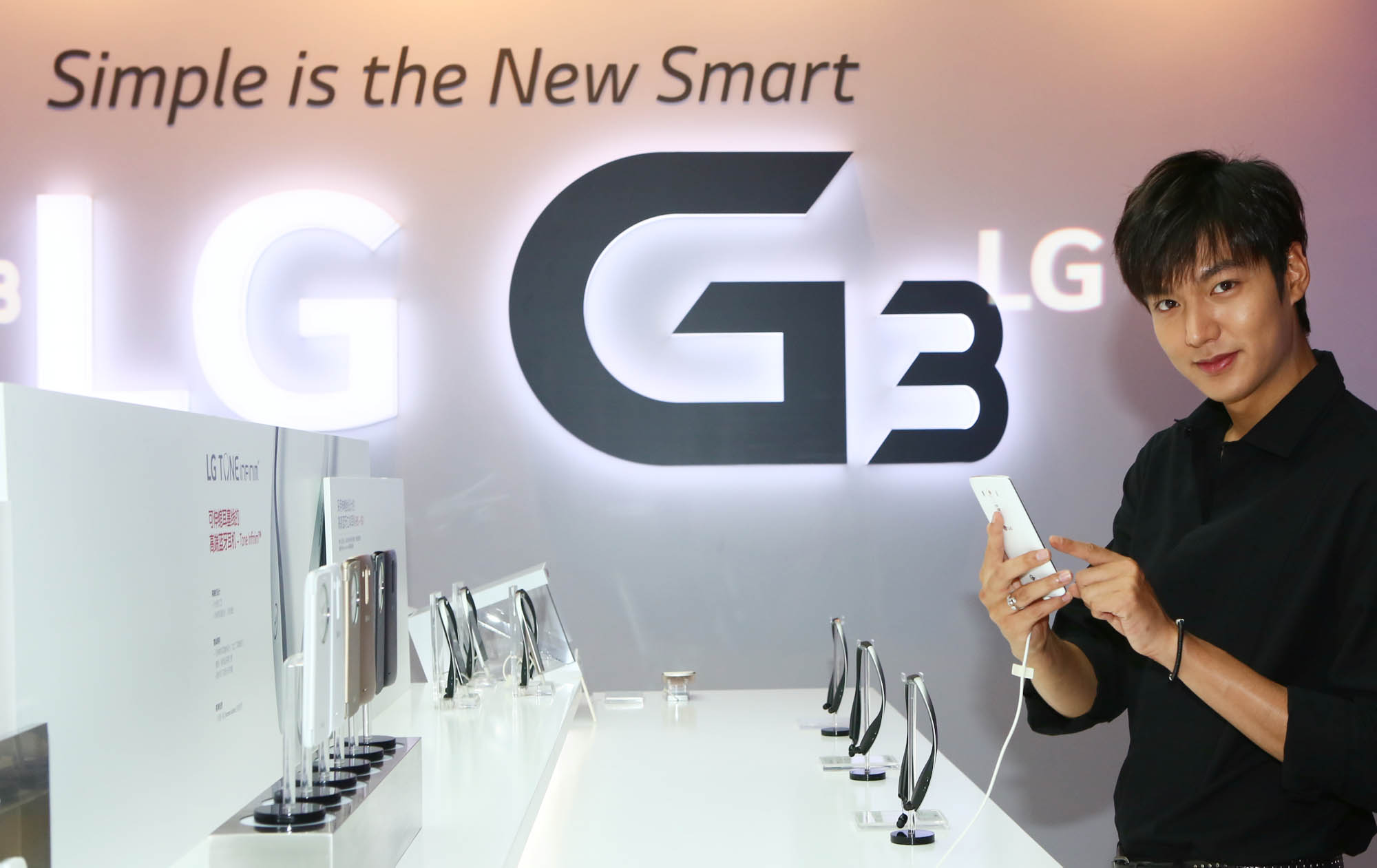
Lee for LG in 2014

Following his debut, Lee became one of South Korea’s most sought-after advertising models, particularly after his breakthrough success in the television series Boys Over Flowers (2009). Since then, he has appeared in a wide range of domestic and international advertising campaigns across fashion, cosmetics, food and beverage, electronics, automotive, tourism, and luxury sectors, serving as both a commercial model and brand ambassador for numerous companies throughout his career.

In 2009, Lee was the advertising model for Pepsi Nex, BR's Dunkin' Donuts, Orion Market O cookies, Samsung Anycall, LG's Teenring, and OB Beer's Cass 2X, appearing alongside model Jessica Gomes. During the same year, he also represented the cosmetic brand Etude House, menswear label Trugen, and Levi Strauss Korea. In 2010, he appeared in advertisements for Binggrae's Banana Flavored Milk, Lotte Chilsung's Cantata coffee, Jangin Furniture, and Bang Bang clothing alongside actress Han Ji-hye. In 2011, Lee was selected as the model for the outdoor clothing brand Eider alongside Yoona. He was also chosen as the advertising model for Toyota's Camry, Hyundai's Veloster, and Chinese clothing brand Semir. In 2012, he was selected as the face of the skincare and beauty brand Innisfree. He also appeared in campaigns for the Thai skincare brand 12Plus, promoting its shower cream alongside actress Patcharapa Chaichua, and for the Philippine clothing brand Bench.

In 2013, Lee was appointed as the promotional ambassador for Lotte Hotel Busan. In 2014, his endorsement activities expanded further both domestically and internationally. He was selected for campaigns for Tencent's Weishi application, Kyochon Chicken, Lotte Duty Free, café brand A Twosome Place, Chinese online shopping platform Taobao, watch brand Romanson, Naver's Line app, and Guess Jeans. In the same year, he also represented Kumho Tire alongside actress Liu Yifei, Singaporean wellness brand OSIM's uDiva massage chairs, Hong Kong-based jewelry brand Chow Tai Fook, and airline Jeju Air. In 2015, Lee was chosen as the model for Ferrero Rocher, Samsonite Red, LF men's lifestyle brand TNGT, and Chinese real-estate developer Shimao Group. In 2016, he was selected as the advertising model for GKL's Seven Luck Casino, Coca-Cola's premium coffee brand Georgia Gothica, and Korea Ginseng Corporation's premium natural ingredients brand Good Base.

In 2020, Lee was selected as the face of BBQ Chicken, Domino's Pizza, and global beauty and healthcare company Cellreturn. He was also selected as an ambassador for the e-commerce platform Lazada. In 2021, he was chosen as the model for the skincare and beauty brand LBB. In 2022, Boss selected Lee as its global ambassador. He was also chosen as the model for the Indonesian cosmetics brand Azarine and the home appliance company Cuckoo Electronics, alongside Malaysian singer Siti Nurhaliza. The same year, Lee was also announced as a brand ambassador for the Italian luxury fashion house Fendi. In 2023, he was appointed as the ambassador for Philippine real-estate developer SMDC. He was also named the face and brand ambassador for Roma Kelapa, a popular Indonesian biscuit brand under Roma. In 2025, Lee was selected as the Asia-Pacific ambassador for the ultrasound lifting device Ultherapy Prime, alongside actress Jun Ji-hyun.

=== Philanthropy ===
In 2014, Lee set up the PROMIZ website, a fund-raising platform to raise awareness and encourage donation for social and humanitarian causes. Proceeds from the sale of PROMIZ merchandise are given to selected partners which execute the charity projects. The site donated $50,000 to help create wells in Malawi through non-profit organization Charity: Water; the sum was gathered by Lee and his fans. PROMIZ has also raised funds and contributed donations to causes such as Good Neighbours, World Water Day, the "Transparent Umbrella Project" and the "Making Warm Winter for Both Bodies and Hearts" campaign. In 2016, PROMIZ won at the Korea Good Brand Awards.

In 2015, Lee donated ₩100 million to UNICEF to aid the victims of the devastating earthquake in Nepal. In 2016, Lee was recognised by the Ministry of Health and Welfare for his contribution to society.

To mark the 10th anniversary of his debut, Lee's fans participated in several charitable events. Lee's Chinese fans planted 510 trees in Inner Mongolia, while his Mexican fans sold plastic bottle caps to recycling companies and donated the proceeds to children suffering from cancer. Taiwanese and Hong Kong made donations to World Vision and UNICEF. In previous years, his Chilean fan club donated to the humanitarian organization Patagonia Compassion and also participated in several other charitable causes.

== Personal life ==
Lee has an older sister, Yun-jeong, who is the co-founder and CEO of his current agency MYM Entertainment.

=== Accident ===
In 2006, Lee's acting career was put on hold for a year following a serious car wreck, which occurred while riding with fellow actor Jung Il-woo and two other friends. The group of friends were driving to Gangwon Province when a car crossing from the opposite lane after fleeing from a previous accident hit them head-on, destroying the hood and engine of their car. Lee and Jung, who were seated in the back, survived the wreck in a critical state. Their friends, both sitting in the front, were instantly killed. Lee was severely injured and in a coma for a month, after which he spent several months bedridden. His injuries included broken ribs, thigh and ankle, along with a tear in his knee cartilage. As part of his treatment, a 46-centimeter metal pin was inserted in his thigh, leaving one of his legs shorter than the other.

=== Military enlistment ===
Lee Min-ho began his mandatory military service on May 12, 2017, at the Suseo Social Welfare Centre in Gangnam District Office as a public service officer. Lee was unable to serve as an active duty soldier due to his previous injuries. He also suffered another car wreck in 2011 while filming City Hunter. On March 15, 2018, Lee started his military training at the Korea Army Training Centre in Nonsan, South Chungcheong Province. He returned to public service duty after four weeks of basic training. He was discharged on April 25, 2019.

== Filmography ==
=== Film ===
Year	Title	Role	Notes	Ref.
2008	Public Enemy Returns	Jung Ha-yeon	Bit part	
2008	Our School's E.T.	Oh Sang-hoon		
2015	Gangnam Blues	Kim Jong-dae		
2016	Bounty Hunters	Yi San	Chinese-South Korean co-production	
2025	Omniscient Reader: The Prophecy	Yoo Joong-hyuk		
2026	The Assassin(s)	Han Young-il		

=== Television series ===
Year	Title	Role	Notes	Ref.
2002	Romance	Student		
2003–2005	Sharp	Lee Jin-ho	Ep. 55–63	
2005	Nonstop 5	MC Mong with plastic surgery	Ep. 213	
2005	Recipe of Love	Waiter		
2006	Secret Campus	Park Du-hyun		
2007	Mackerel Run	Cha Gong-chan		
2007	I Am Sam	Heo Mo-se		
2008	Get Up	Min Wook-gi		
2009	Boys Over Flowers	Gu Jun-pyo		
2010	Personal Taste	Jeon Jin-ho		
2011	City Hunter	Lee Yoon-sung		
2012	Faith	Choe Yeong		
2013	The Heirs	Kim Tan		
2016	The Legend of the Blue Sea	Kim Dam-ryeong / Heo Joon-jae		
2017	DMZ, The Wild	Himself	Documentary	
2020	The King: Eternal Monarch	Emperor Lee Gon		
2022–present	Pachinko	Koh Hansu	Season 1–2	
2025	When the Stars Gossip	Gong Ryong		

=== Web series ===
Year	Title	Role	Notes	Ref.
2011–2012	Toyota Camry; The One and Only	Joon / Kwon		
2012	Innisfree First Love	Innisfree CEO		
2014	Line Romance	Min-ho		
2015	Innisfree Summer Love	Himself		
2016	7 First Kisses	Himself		

=== Music video appearances ===
Title	Year	Artist(s)	Ref.
"Kiss"	2009	Sandara Park	

== Discography ==
- My Everything (2013, Korean)
- My Everything (2013, Japanese)
- Song for You (2014)
