= Get Up (film) =

2008 South Korean television film

- Promotional poster
- Hangul: 나도 잘 모르지만
- Lit.: But I don't really know either
- RR: Nado jal moreujiman
- MR: Nado chal morŭjiman
- Written by: Ko Eun-nim
- Directed by: Lee Jae-dong
- Starring: Lee Min-ho; Rhyme; Lee Ah-jin
- Country of origin: South Korea
- Original language: Korean
- No. of episodes: 1 (television film)

Production
- Production location: South Korea
- Production company: MBC

Original release
- Network: MBC
- Release: 24 February 2008

Get Up is a 2008 South Korean television film on the educational problems of adolescents in schools. It starred Lee Min-ho, Rhyme, and Lee Ah-jin.

== Synopsis ==
High school students Min Wook-gi (Lee Min-ho) and Doo-heon (Rhyme) both land in trouble after they get into a fight. Doo-heon gets suspended, and Wook-gi has to clean his teacher's (Gi Ju-bong) car as punishment. While he's cleaning, his girlfriend Joo-won (Choi Ah-jin) shows up to tell him she's going on a ski trip with her new boyfriend. To chase after his girlfriend, Wook-gi tries to steal his teacher's car – but he can't drive. As he's making a run for it, Doo-heon happens to pass by on his motorcycle, and the two end up hitting the open road together.

== Cast ==
- Lee Min-ho as Min Wook-gi
- Rhyme as Lee Doo-heon
- Lee Ah-jin as Joo-won
- Gi Ju-bong
- Lee Doo-il
- Nam Kyeong-eup
