= Lee Sa-bi =

South Korean model and actress (born 1977)

- Born: Lee Eon-jeong; July 3, 1977 (age 49); Yeongcheon, South Korea
- Education: Catholic University of Daegu - Dance (leave of absence)
- Occupations: Model; actress
- Years active: 1998–present

Korean name
- Hangul: 이언정
- Hanja: 李言貞
- RR: I Eonjeong
- MR: I Ŏnjŏng

Former stage name
- Hangul: 이사비
- Hanja: 李思枇
- RR: I Sabi
- MR: I Sabi

Lee Sa-bi (Korean: 이사비; born July 3, 1977), birth name Lee Eon-jeong, is a South Korean model and actress. She began her modelling career as a runway model in Daegu in 1998. Lee was the first native Korean to become a Playboy model. Her nude photo shoot was published in February 2004, and broadcast by South Korea's three largest telecommunication carriers to 16 mobile and internet services. Lee has since appeared in minor roles on TV and film since her acting debut in 2009: Lost Memories (2002). She also released a yoga exercise video in 2006.

== Filmography ==
=== Television drama ===
- Family Secret (tvN, 2014) - Kim Mi-yeon
- A Touch of Purity (KBS2, 2013) - Se-young
- Love Again (JTBC, 2012)
- Iris (KBS2, 2009) - Tae-young
- Empress Cheonchu (KBS2, 2009) - Hyeolmae
- Urban Legends Deja Vu 1 (Super Action, 2007) - Shin So-ra (guest appearance, ep 4)
- One Fine Day (SBS, 2006) - Choi Sun-kyung
- My Girl (SBS, 2005–2006) - Yoon Jin-kyung
- Hello Franceska (MBC, 2005) - Victoria (guest appearance)
- Toji, the Land (SBS, 2004–2005) - Jang-yi
- You are a Star (KBS1, 2004–2005) - Young-ran

=== Film ===
- Hot Service: A Cruel Hairdresser (2015) - Nan-ja
- Man on High Heels (2014) - Joo-yeon
- A Touch of Unseen (2014) - Yeon-soo
- The Fatal Encounter (2014) - gisaeng at gibang 1
- Way Back Home (2013) - KBC TV writer
- Hindsight (2011) - coffee shop clerk
- Iris: The Movie (2010) - Tae-young
- Our School's E.T. (2008) - chemistry teacher
- She's on Duty (2005)
- Doll Master (2004)
- Hypnotized (2004)
- 2009: Lost Memories (2002)

=== Variety show ===
- Studio Pink (OnStyle, 2007–2008)

=== Music video appearances ===
- Sung Si-kyung - "사랑하는 일 (To Love)" (2008)
- Epik High - "Fly" (2005)

== Theater ==
- Thief's Diary (2009)
