= Last Present =

2001 film by Oh Ki-hwan

- Theatrical release poster
- Hangul: 선물
- Hanja: 膳物
- Lit.: Present
- RR: Seonmul
- MR: Sŏnmul
- Directed by: Oh Ki-hwan
- Written by: Park Jung-woo
- Produced by: Kim Mi-hee; Kim Sang-jin; Kang Woo-suk
- Starring: Lee Jung-jae; Lee Young-ae
- Cinematography: Lee Suck-hyun
- Edited by: Lee Hyun-mee
- Music by: Jo Seong-woo
- Distributed by: Cinema Service
- Release date: March 24, 2001
- Running time: 113 minutes
- Country: South Korea
- Language: Korean

Last Present (Korean: 선물; RR: Seonmul; lit. 'Present') is a 2001 South Korean romantic drama film directed by Oh Ki-hwan. It tells the tale of Yong-ki, a struggling comedian who continues to see parallels between his disintegrating relationship with his wife, Jung-yeon, and the characters he's playing on the stage.

== Plot ==
The film traces the romance, marriage and estrangement of a down-and-out comedian, Yong-ki and his long-suffering wife, Jung-yeon. They defied Yong-ki's parents to get married, but it seems his parents' fears that the marriage will never work out are coming true. Yong-ki hides behind a facade of optimism even as he turns down boring job offers in the hopes that his comedic talent will be noticed on a famous talent show he is auditioning for.

Meanwhile, Jung-yeon has to support them both as well as bear the pain of a miscarriage that Yong-ki is trying his best to forget. To make matters worse, Jung-yeon discovers that she is dying from a terminal disease and though Yong-ki suspects that something is wrong, she never tells him about her illness. Through the silent suffering and the estrangement, both husband and wife believe their marriage is over. What they fail to realize until it is too late, however, is that they still love each other deeply. They have simply been overwhelmed by the trials life has thrown at them.

== Cast ==
- Lee Jung-jae as Jung Yong-ki
  - Oh Seung-jun as young Yong-ki
- Lee Young-ae as Park Jung-yeon
  - Jang Mi-na as young Jung-yeon
  - Kim Tae-hee as teenage Jung-yeon
- Kwon Hae-hyo as Hak-soo
- Lee Mu-hyeon as Hak-chul
- Gong Hyung-jin as Chul-soo
- Yun Jin-young as Jin-young
- Sa Hyeon-jin as Hye-jung
- Lee In-chul as Teacher Kwak Hyung-min
- Lee Moon-sik as Young-man
  - Jang Heon-gwang as young Young-man
- Ku Hye-ryung as Ae-sook
  - Jung Hwa-young as young Ae-sook
  - Yu Min-jeong as teenage Ae-sook
- Kim Sung-kyum sd Yong-ki's father
- Park Seung-tae as Yong-ki's mother
- Maeng Sang-hoon as PD Hwang
- Chu Kwi-jung as PD Hwang's wife
- Park Hwi-soon as Comedian
- Kim Byung-man as Comedian
- Kim Soo-ro as Yoo-sik
- Hong Seok-cheon
- Kim Young-bae as Kwang-sik
- Gong Hyo-jin as Female MC
- Kim Sang-jin as Yoo-sik's manager
