= It's Okay, Daddy's Girl =

2010–2011 South Korean TV series

- Promotional poster
- Also known as: It's Alright, Daddy's Daughter; It's Alright, Daddy's Girl
- Written by: Han Joon-young
- Directed by: Go Heung-shik
- Starring: Moon Chae-won; Park In-hwan; Choi Jin-hyuk
- Country of origin: South Korea
- No. of episodes: 17

Production
- Producer: Kim Young Sub SBS
- Production companies: Story 365; CH Entertainment

Original release
- Network: SBS TV
- Release: November 22, 2010 – January 28, 2011

It's Okay, Daddy's Girl (Korean: 괜찮아, 아빠 딸; RR: Gwaenchana, appa ttal) is a South Korean television series that aired on SBS TV from November 22, 2010 to January 28, 2011.

== Plot ==
Being the youngest and spoiled in her family, Eun Chae-ryung would completely rely on her father. When he has brain hemorrhage one day, she begins to realize that she must grow out of her sheltered life and face numerous hardships before becoming independent.

== Cast ==
Eun family

- Moon Chae-won as Eun Chae-ryung
- Lee Hee-jin as Eun Ae-ryung
- Kang Won as Eun Ho-ryung
- Park In-hwan as Eun Ki-hwan
- Kim Hye-ok as Heo Sook-hee
- Yoo Seung-mok as Heo Man-soo

Choi family

- Choi Jin-hyuk as Choi Hyuk-ki
- Shin Min-soo as Choi Duk-ki
- Lee Donghae as Choi Wook-ki
- Lee Bong-gyu as Hyuk-ki's father
- Lee Yong-nyeo as Hyuk-ki's mother

Jung family

- Im Kang-sung as Jung Jin-goo
- Jin Se-yeon as Jung Se-yeon
- Choi Ja-hye as Seo Hee-jae
- Park Geun-hyung as Jung Pil-suk
- Yeon Woon-kyung as Yeo Chang-ja

Park family

- Jun Tae-soo as Park Jong-suk
- Lee Won-jae as Park Kwon (Jong-suk's father)
- Park Hye-jin as Mo Yoon-kyung (Jong-suk's mother)

Extended cast

- Kang Min-hyuk as Hwang Yeon-doo
- Hong Yeo-jin as Lee Soon-jung
- Song In-hwa as Go Yang-mi
- Jo Han-joon as Park Moo-sool
- Kim Dong-gyoon as Kwak Kyun-woo
- Han Soo-min as Geum Joo-hye
- Nam Ji-hyun (Note: Credited as Son Ji-hyun.) as Shin Sun-hae
- Hwang Sun-hee as Ma Ri-sol
- Min Ji-oh as Kang Bo-ra
- Kim Gyu-jin as Shim Byung-chun
- Park Sang-hoon as Shin Sun-do
- Park Jung-geun as Kang Dong-bo
- Marco as Marco
- Sung Chang-hoon as Ricardo
- Song Yi-woo as Jo Ah-ra
- Seo Dong-soo as Professor Kang
- Lee Jin-ah as Jun So-hyung
- Yoo Byung-sun as Min Hyun-gyo
- Lee Sun-ah as Ah-young
- Yeom Dong-heon as Ah-young's father
- Choi Sung-joon as Doctor Hong
- Kim Min-seo as Park Da-bin
- Lee Do-yeop

== Ratings ==
Date	Episode	Nationwide	Seoul
2010-11-22	1	10.1 (8th)	10.9 (8th)
2010-11-29	2	8.6 (15th)	8.7 (16th)
2010-11-30	3	7.6 (18th)	7.9 (16th)
2010-12-06	4	(<7.8)	8.1 (18th)
2010-12-07	5	(<7.3)	(<7.3)
2010-12-13	6	8.1 (19th)	8.5 (16th)
2010-12-14	7	8.3 (17th)	8.6 (15th)
2010-12-20	8	7.9	(<7.6)
2010-12-21	9	7.4	7.8 (20th)
2010-12-27	10	7.2	(<7.6)
2010-12-28	11	7.3	(<7.8)
2011-01-03	12	6.9	(<9.5)
2011-01-04	13	8.1	9.6 (18th)
2011-01-10	14	8.0	(<10.3)
2011-01-11	15	8.0 (19th)	9.3 (17th)
2011-01-17	16	(<8.5)	9.2 (20th)
2011-01-18	17	9.1 (16th)	10.9 (11th)
Average		8.0	8.8
