= Park Jung-woo (director) =

South Korean filmmaker (born 1969)

- Born: 1969 (age 56–57); South Korea
- Occupations: Film director, screenwriter

Korean name
- Hangul: 박정우
- RR: Bak Jeongu
- MR: Pak Chŏngu

Park Jung-woo (Korean: 박정우; born 1969) is a South Korean film director and screenwriter. Park is a screenwriter turned director, and probably ranks as South Korea's most well-known screenwriter for his famous stories such as Attack the Gas Station (1999), Last Present (2001), Kick the Moon (2001), Break Out (2002) and Jail Breakers (2002). In 2004, he debuted with his directorial feature Dance with the Wind (2004). His third feature Deranged (2012) is a refreshing and unique take on the disaster genre, and was a hit with more than 4.5 million admissions.

== Filmography ==
=== As director ===
- Dance with the Wind (2004)
- Big Bang (2007)
- Deranged (2012)
- Pandora (2016)

=== As assistant director ===
- Beyond the Mountain (1991)
- I Wish for What Is Forbidden to Me (1994)
- To You from Me (1994)
- A Man Wagging His Tail (1995)
- Change (1997)
- Oasis (2002)

=== As screenwriter ===
- The Last Defense (1997)
- First Kiss (1998)
- Attack the Gas Station (1999)
- Promenade (2000)
- Last Present (2001)
- Kick the Moon (2001)
- Break Out (2002)
- Jail Breakers (2002)
- Dance with the Wind (2004)
- Big Bang (2007)
- Thirsty, Thirsty (2009)
- Descendants of Hong Gil-dong (2009)
- Deranged (2012)
- Pandora (2016)

=== As executive producer ===
- Dance with the Wind (2004) (also as investor)

=== As script editor ===
- I Wish for What Is Forbidden to Me (1994)
- Never to Lose (2005)

== Awards ==
- 2002 23rd Blue Dragon Film Awards: Best Screenplay (Jail Breakers)
- 2003 39th Baeksang Arts Awards: Best Screenplay (Break Out)
