= Lee Kan-hee =

South Korean actress (born 1969)

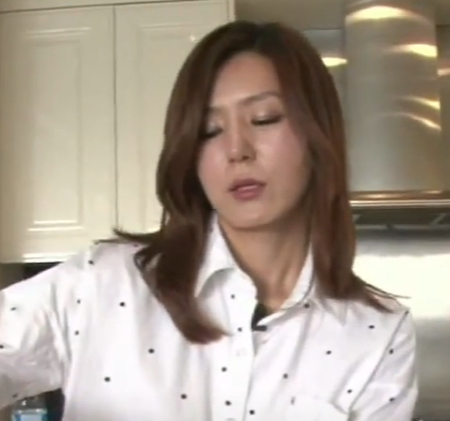
- Lee in 2016
- Born: February 3, 1969 (age 57); South Korea
- Education: Seoul Art College - Theater
- Occupation: Actress
- Years active: 1989–present

Korean name
- Hangul: 이칸희
- RR: I Kanhui
- MR: I K'anhŭi

Lee Kan-hee (born February 3, 1969) is a South Korean actress.

== Filmography ==
=== Film ===
Year	Title	Role
1989	Shinsa-dong Gigolo	Saleswoman
1989	Memories of Balbari	Girl in pool hall
2001	Prison World Cup	Ppang-jang's wife
2002	Public Enemy	Cho Kyu-hwan's wife
2002	Sympathy for Mr. Vengeance	Park Dong-jin's ex-wife
2002	Make It Big	Seong-hwan's mother
2002	Unborn but Forgotten	Hospital director
2003	Out of Focus (short film)	
2004	Dance with the Wind	Kyung-soon
2004	Marrying High School Girl	Ahn Pyung-gang's mother
2005	A Bold Family	Kim Myeong-seok's wife
2005	Bravo, My Life	Sang-soo's mother
2006	A Millionaire's First Love	Choi Eun-hwan's mother
2006	Hanbando	First Lady
2007	Someone Behind You	Ga-in's mother
2008	Modern Boy	Madam of culture club
2009	Flight	Su-kyoung's mother (cameo)
2010	Le Grand Chef 2: Kimchi Battle	Teacher Kong
2011	Ryang-kang-do: Merry Christmas, North!	Jong-soo's mother
2012	Doomsday Book	Yoon Seok-woo's mother (segment: "A Brave New World")
2012	Never Ending Story	Jin-joo's aunt
2017	The Chase	Jung-hyuk's wife
2017	The Artist: Reborn	Shrine mother

=== Television series ===
Year	Title	Role
1998	Panther of Kilimanjaro	
1999	The Clinic for Married Couples: Love and War	
2002–2003	The Dawn of the Empire	Princess Naknang / Lady Sillan
2003	Age of Warriors	Jo Won-jeong's wife
2004	Immortal Admiral Yi Sun-sin	Queen Insun
2005	Sweet Spy	
2007	Bad Diary	
2008	Hometown of Legends: "Gumiho"	In-hong's mother
2009	Glory of Youth	Jang Ji-soon
2010	KBS Drama Special: "Boy Meets Girl"	Sook-hee
2011	Kimchi Family	Lee Kang-san's mother
2012	Flower Band	
2012	Syndrome	Kang Hee-yeon
2012	KBS Drama Special: "The True Colors of Gang and Cheol"	Court lady Ahn
2012	Can Love Become Money	
2014	Secret Affair	Myung-hwa
2014	My Lovely Girl	Shi-woo's mother
2014	SOS Please Save Me	Lee Sang-mi
2016	Something About 1%	Kang Se-hee
2017	Man in the Kitchen	Sarah Kang
2017	Strongest Deliveryman	Jeong Sook
2017	Fatal Promise	Yeon Doo-sim
2017	My Secret Romance	Kim Ae-Ryung
2018	A Poem a Day	Min-ho's mother
2020	No Matter What	Jeong Nan-young
2021	The Second Husband	Ok Kyeong-i
2022	Thirty-Nine	Mi-jo's mother

== Awards and nominations ==
Year	Award	Category	Nominated work	Result
2004	41st Grand Bell Awards	Best Supporting Actress	Dance with the Wind	Nominated
