= Big Bang (film) =

- Poster
- Directed by: Park Jung-woo
- Written by: Park Jung-woo
- Produced by: Kim Tae-eun; Im Seung-yong; Jung Chul-woo
- Starring: Kam Woo-sung; Kim Soo-ro
- Cinematography: Choi Chan-min
- Edited by: Steve M. Choe
- Music by: Shin Hae-chul
- Distributed by: Showbox; Mediaplex
- Release date: March 14, 2007
- Running time: 118 minutes
- Country: South Korea
- Language: Korean
- Budget: US$4.9 million

Big Bang (Korean: 쏜다; RR: Ssonda; lit. 'I'll Shoot') is a 2007 South Korean action-comedy film written and directed by Park Jung-woo, and starring Kam Woo-sung and Kim Soo-ro.

== Plot ==
Park Man-su is an ordinary salaryman who lives his life according to a strict set of rules, and this lack of flexibility makes him hard to like at home and at the office. One day, his wife asks for a divorce because she's bored with their life, and he is fired because his corrupt boss hates him. So on his way home, the frustrated and outraged Man-su tries to set himself free by breaking all the rules that have restricted him his entire life by deviating from them, just for one day. He swears at passers-by, kicks signboards and pees on the street, and he is soon placed under arrest by Ma Dong-cheol, a demoted but zealous cop. Officer Ma takes him to the police station to teach him a lesson, where Man-su meets Yang Cheol-gon, a career criminal with 15 previous convictions, who finds it more comfortable to be behind bars. Cheol-gon incites the desperate and timid Man-su to escape the police station with him, and through a series of mishaps, they happen to steal a gun and police car, with which they also try their hand at punishing "law dodgers" themselves. With Officer Ma in hot pursuit, Man-su and Cheol-gon find themselves branded as antisocial vigilantes, and the ₩50,000 fine for Man-su's original misdemeanor has now turned into a potential life sentence. Thus, the unlikely pair spend a wild night together in Seoul.

== Cast ==
- Kam Woo-sung as Park Man-su
- Kim Soo-ro as Yang Cheol-gon
- Kang Sung-jin as Ma Dong-cheol
- Moon Jeong-hee as Han Gyeong-sun, Man-su's wife
- Jang Hang-sun as Shim Pyeong-seop
- Kim Young-ok as Cheol-gon's mother
- Jo Seok-hyun as Section chief Kim
- Jeon Guk-hwan as Man-su's father
- Lee Jeong-heon as Seo Tae-hun
- Kim Hyuk as Shim Tae-yong
- Choi Jung-woo as Section Chief Detective
- Kim Se-dong as Police Sergeant Kim
- Park Jin-taek as Police Corporal Park
- Park Gun-tae as young Man-su
- Park Jin-young as Gyeong-sun's father
