= Awaiting =

2014 South Korean short film

- Poster
- Hangul: 민우씨 오는 날
- RR: Minu ssi oneun nal
- MR: Minu ssi onŭn nal
- Directed by: Kang Je-gyu
- Written by: Kang Je-gyu
- Produced by: Kang Je-gyu; Victor Koo; Frank Wei
- Starring: Moon Chae-won; Go Soo
- Cinematography: Lee Jong-youl
- Edited by: Park Gok-ji
- Music by: Lee Dong-jun
- Release dates: March 27, 2014 (HKIFF); December 18, 2014 (South Korea)
- Running time: 28 minutes
- Country: South Korea
- Language: Korean

Awaiting (Korean: 민우씨 오는 날; lit. 'The Day Min-woo Arrives') is a 2014 South Korean short film written and directed by Kang Je-gyu, starring Moon Chae-won and Go Soo.

It is one of four short films comprising Beautiful 2014, the third annual omnibus project commissioned by Chinese online platform Youku Tudou and the Hong Kong International Film Festival. The other short films were The Dream directed by Shu Kei, HK 2014 - Education for All directed by Christopher Doyle, and Boss I Love You directed by Zhang Yuan. Beautiful 2014 premiered at the 38th Hong Kong International Film Festival on March 27, 2014. Awaiting received a theatrical release in South Korea on December 18, 2014.

== Plot ==
A young woman named Yeon-hee is traveling to Pyongyang with a coach full of elderly people. As she flips through old photographs, she remembers telling her husband Min-woo that she wouldn't allow him to "cross over" to North Korea given the political situation of the day. But Min-woo left anyway and never returned home, and their marriage was torn apart by the Korean War. Now, sixty years after the division of Korea, she looks forward to reuniting with her beloved Min-woo again.

== Cast ==
- Moon Chae-won as Yeon-hee (past)
- Go Soo as Min-woo
- Son Sook as Yeon-hee (present)
- Yoo Ho-jeong as Sa-ra
- Choi Kyu-hwan
- Yoon Da-hoon as truck driver
- Kim Soo-ro
- Lee Dong-jin as officer
