= Heartman: Rock and Love =

2026 film by Choi Won-sub

- Theatrical release poster
- Hangul: 하트맨
- RR: Hateumaen
- MR: Hat'ŭmaen
- Directed by: Choi Won-sub
- Screenplay by: Lee Soo-ah
- Based on: No Kids by Ariel Winograd
- Starring: Kwon Sang-woo; Moon Chae-won; Kim Seo-heon; Park Ji-hwan; Pyo Ji-hoon
- Cinematography: Kim Sung-an
- Edited by: Kim Chang-ju
- Music by: Kim Ji-hye; Bang Jun-seok
- Production companies: Movie Rock; LikeMCompany; Globalgate Entertainment
- Distributed by: Lotte Entertainment
- Release date: January 14, 2026
- Running time: 100 minutes
- Country: South Korea
- Language: Korean
- Box office: US$1.6 million

Heartman: Rock and Love (Korean: 하트맨) is a 2026 South Korean romantic comedy-drama film directed by Choi Won-sub. It is a remake of the 2015 Argentine film No Kids directed by Ariel Winograd. The film stars Kwon Sang-woo, Moon Chae-won, Kim Seo-heon, Park Ji-hwan, and Pyo Ji-hoon. Distributed by Lotte Entertainment, it was released in South Korea on January 14, 2026.

== Plot ==
In his youth, Seung-min harbors an unspoken first love for Bo-na, the younger sister of a friend. Because of his timid nature, he never confesses his feelings. As time passes, Seung-min, now preparing for a performance as the vocalist of a rock band, is handing out concert flyers when he unexpectedly runs into Bo-na again at a college festival. Not only does Bo-na strike up a conversation first, she also subtly reveals that she, too, had liked Seung-min in the past, giving them a chance to start something anew.

However, just before he is about to sing a song for her at the performance he invited her to, Seung-min suffers a humiliating accident when the front of his pants rips, exposing his underwear. In his frantic attempt to deal with it, he ends up being taken away in an ambulance. The incident leaves him traumatized, and with Seung-min hospitalized and Bo-na soon emigrating overseas with her family, their connection comes to an end.

In the years since, Seung-min has become a divorced man and the devoted father of a beloved daughter, So-young. Running a musical instrument shop, he manages to adapt to everyday life. Then one day, he reunites with his first love Bo-na, who has returned as a photographer with a strict no-kids lifestyle preference.

== Cast ==
- Kwon Sang-woo as Choi Seung-min
- Moon Chae-won as Han Bo-na
- Kim Seo-heon as Choi So-young
- Park Ji-hwan as Lee Won-dae
- Pyo Ji-hoon as Choi Seung-ho
- Shin So-yul as Ji-woo
- Kim Gook-hee as Mi-young

== Production ==
In May 2021, Kwon Sang-woo and Moon Chae-won were confirmed to star in the film.

== Release ==
The first trailer was released on December 2, 2025, and it was announced that the film would be officially released in South Korea on December 31 of the same year.

== Reception ==
The film was released on January 14, 2026, on 839 screens. It opened at third place at the South Korean box office with 26,685 admissions.

The film has grossed US$1,562,127 from 244,293 admissions.
