= Min Ji-hyun =

South Korean actress (born 1984)

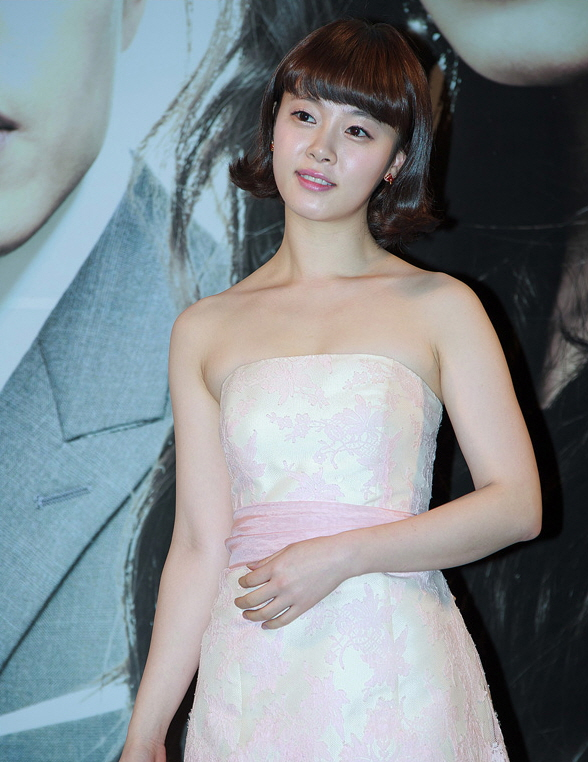
- Min in February 2012
- Born: November 6, 1984 (age 41); South Korea
- Education: Myongji College - Theater Studies
- Occupation: Actress
- Years active: 2005–present

Korean name
- Hangul: 민지현
- RR: Min Jihyeon
- MR: Min Chihyŏn

Min Ji-hyun (Korean: 민지현; born November 6, 1984) is a South Korean actress.

== Filmography ==
=== Television series ===
Year	Title	Role	Network
2005	The Youth in Bare Foot		MBC
2007	Mackerel Run	Ki Yeo-woon	SBS
2008	My Cop	Female police officer	tvN
2009	Splendor of Youth	Yang Sang-mi	KBS1
2011	Servant, The Untold Story of Bang-ja	Hyang-dan	Channel CGV
2012	Ice Adonis	Seol Soo-ae	tvN
2017	Strong Girl Bong-soon	Kidnapped Pharmacist	JTBC

=== Film ===
Year	Title	Role
2008	Our School's E.T.	Ki-ho's seat partner
2008	A Frozen Flower	King's concubine
2013	Norigae	Jung Ji-hee

=== Music video appearance ===
Year	Song title	Artist
2006	"The Knight Who Saved a Doll"	NeXT

== Awards and nominations ==
Year	Award	Category	Nominated work	Result
2013	50th Grand Bell Awards	Best New Actress	Norigae	Nominated
