= Dance with the Wind =

- Film poster
- Hangul: 바람의 전설
- Hanja: 바람의 傳說
- RR: Baramui jeonseol
- MR: Paramŭi chŏnsŏl
- Directed by: Park Jung-woo
- Written by: Seong Seok-jae; Park Jung-woo
- Produced by: Jo Mi-hyang; Kim Yong-dae
- Starring: Lee Sung-jae; Park Sol-mi; Kim Soo-ro; Lee Kan-hee; Moon Jeong-hee
- Cinematography: Jeon Dae-seong
- Edited by: Ko Im-pyo
- Music by: Lee Sang-ho
- Distributed by: Cinema Service
- Release date: April 9, 2004
- Running time: 132 minutes
- Country: South Korea
- Language: Korean

Dance with the Wind (Korean: 바람의 전설; Baramui jeonseol) is a 2004 South Korean comedy-drama film starring Lee Sung-jae and Park Sol-mi, and is the directorial debut of Park Jung-woo. The story is adapted from a 1999 book by novelist Ji Seong-sa.

== Plot ==
In a hospital parking lot, Officer Song Yeon-hwa is briefed about Park Pung-shik, an alleged gigolo who preys on rich housewives. One of his latest victims is the police chief's wife, who refuses to testify against him, despite giving him $30,000. Song is told to go undercover as a hospital patient in order to secure evidence leading to his arrest. In the hospital, she finds the mild-mannered Park and talks to him over coffee, where he mentions that he ballroom dances for a living. Song asks him why he came to become a dancer and he starts his story.

Years ago, Park was living a life without meaning, despite being married with a baby boy. One day he ran into an old school friend, Song Man-su, by chance and they spent the next few weeks partying every night, to his wife's chagrin. Soon Man-su approached him at his place of work, asking if he could use one of the rooms to teach ballroom dance, openly admitting that he is a gigolo. Park vocally turned him down, but a co-worker ended up giving Man-Su permission. The classes proved to be a great success and Man-su asked Park if he would want to help teach the classes. Initially, Park refused, not wanting to be a part of that world, but eventually he agreed to take a single lesson from Man-su. Upon taking the first step of his jive, Park instantly fell in love with dance.

Over the next few days, Park assisted Man-su in his lessons by day, and took additional ones from him at night, his entire life being obsessed with dance. However, this happiness came to an end when Park's office was trashed by a man cuckolded by Man-su. That night, Man-su met Park, saying that he would be going to prison for a while, revealing that he doesn't think of dance as art, just as a way of seducing women. Park was inflamed by this and resolved to redeem dance from the image of scumbags like Man-su.

Since studios were scarce, Park left his home, wife, and child in a quest to learn how to dance properly. His teachers included a geriatric old man who could barely move unless he was dancing Jive, an alcoholic lighthouse keeper who threw himself into the ocean after he finished teaching Park the waltz, a quickstepping rancher, a steelyard worker who danced the cha-cha-cha, a monk who could paso doble, and a construction worker who taught him the tango. After spending five years across the country, Park finally returned home to his family.

Song relays this part of the story to her superior, who is struck by how callous Park must be to abandon his family for five years. However, Song expressed doubt that someone who could pursue dance so earnestly could be a swindler. Back at the hospital, Song asks Park to teach her how to dance. Just like Park, she fell in love with dance with the first step of her jive. For then on, she stalls on getting more testimony from Park, instead taking numerous dance lessons from him. Eventually, the two go out together and he continues his story.

Despite his wife growing increasingly angry at him, the only thing on Park's mind was dance. He eventually lowered himself to going to a shady cabaret bar in order to dance. There he met a woman he only referred to as Madame, and they began to waltz together nightly. Park was happy just to be dancing, but Madame wanted more out of the relationship, eventually forcing herself upon him. After that incident, Park cut off all contact with Madame, despite her persistent efforts to get in contact with him.

After a few weeks, he decided to meet with her. In order to spare her feelings, Park made up a story about how he couldn't see her because he had to tend to his failing business. This touched her heart and the next day she gave him an envelope of money, which he reluctantly accepts. Following this, Park went through a long string of dancing relationships, each ending similarly, with him receiving an envelope of money. He used this money to provide for his family and his married life seemed to have improved.

Man-su caught up with Park once again, telling him even though he was in and out of prison that he heard about Park's exploits, and that he was quickly becoming a legend in the gigolo community. Park was disgusted by being compared to the likes of Man-su, and he angrily maintains that he is not a gigolo. However, this belief was brought into question when he was attacked by the angry husband of one of his former partners.

While taking his son to a school recital one day, Park ran into Madame, also taking her child to the recital. After an awkward conversation, Park agreed to have one last waltz with Madame, dancing to the sound of their children singing. Park's wife arrived as they were finishing their dance, and angrily slapped him. Soon after they were divorced.

After hearing this part of his story, Song turns on Park calling him a gigolo. As always, Park denies this, but Song leaves all the same. She meets her superior telling him that Park confessed, but she doesn't have it on tape and asking to be removed from the case. Torn between her love of dance and her disgust at Park, she tracks down Man-su asking him where she can find Park. In telling her where he will be, Man-su relays more of Park's story to Song.

Shortly after his divorce, Park met a woman named Ji-yeon at the cabaret bar and they began dancing rumba together. For the first time, he fell for one of his partners; her soft-spoken purity enraptured him. However, she didn't reciprocate his feelings, eventually falling out of contact with him.

When they finally meet again, Ji-yeon told him about how her cafe was on the verge of bankrupt. They met again after this and Park gave her an envelope of money, which she tearfully accepts. As they are on the verge of consummating their relationship, Ji-yeon's brother walked into the room and beats Park so viciously that he ends up in the hospital Song would go undercover in. Even throughout his recuperation, Park went out to the cabaret bar every night hoping to see her again. Man-su found him and told him that Ji-yeon was actually an escort, as famous as Park is in the field. He also told him where she would be that night.

Song and Man-su race to the club, hopefully before Park does something foolish. However, Park is already there and confronts Ji-yeon, who is working another mark. She publicly denies knowing Park, though later she coldly acknowledges him, telling him to stop acting like a kid. This sets him off and he grabs her by the hair, intent on harming her. Song arrives just in time and defuses the situation; however, the police arrive just after. With the chief's wife finally agreeing to testify, they arrest him.

Two years later, ballroom dancing has been legitimized in Korea, rebranding itself as DanceSport. Song now runs a dance studio herself. She manages to find Park, who is living at the lighthouse of his former teacher. Park claims that he no longer dances, but Song reignites his passion with an energetic jive and romantic waltz.
