= Moon Chae-won =

South Korean actress (born 1986)

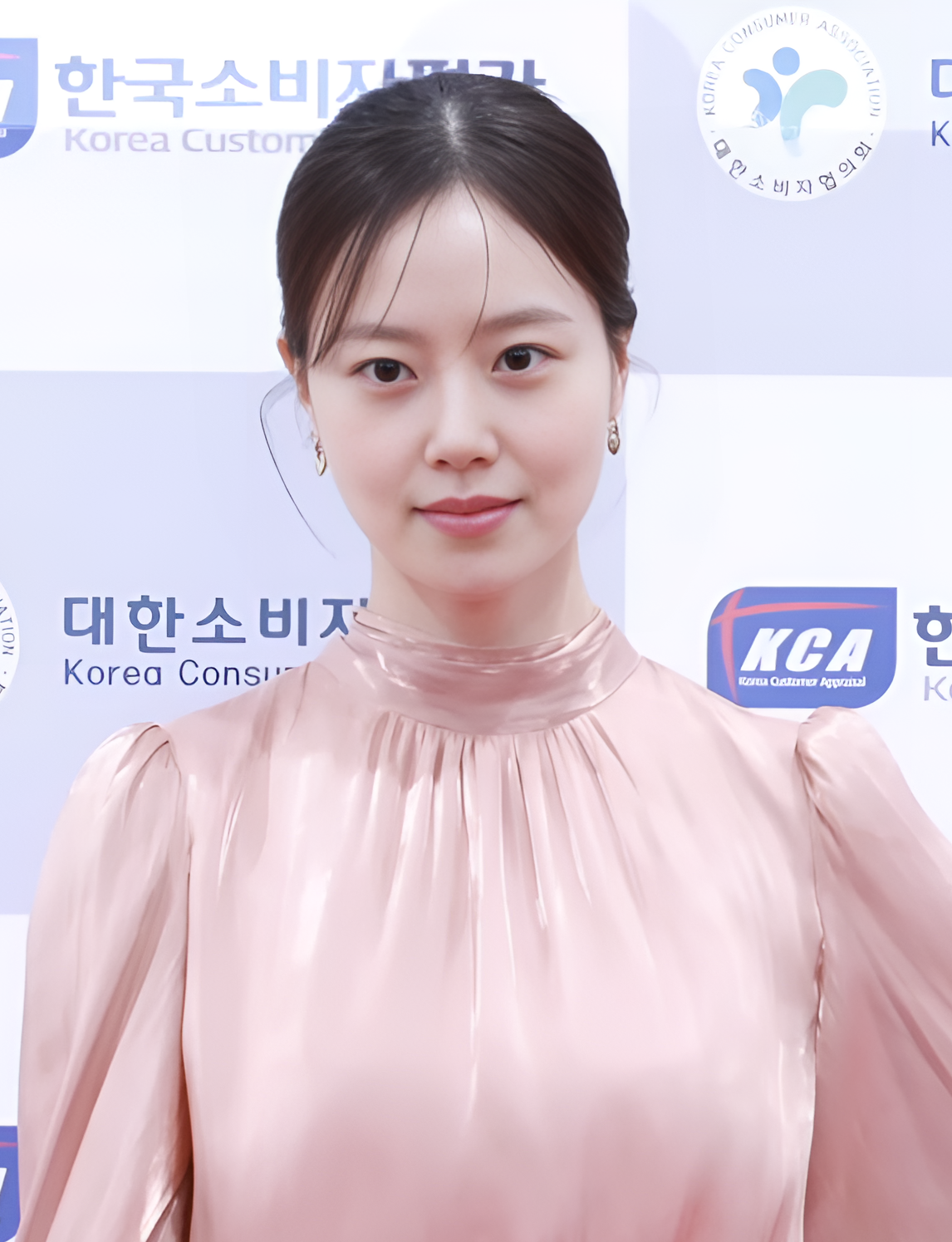
- Moon in December 2023
- Born: November 13, 1986 (age 39); Daegu, South Korea
- Occupation: Actress
- Years active: 2007–present
- Agent: Blitzway Entertainment
- Spouse: Unknown (m. 2026)

Korean name
- Hangul: 문채원
- Hanja: 文彩元
- RR: Mun Chaewon
- MR: Mun Ch'aewŏn

Moon Chae-won (Korean: 문채원; born November 13, 1986) is a South Korean actress. Moon first attracted attention in her supporting role as a gisaeng in Painter of the Wind (2008). She then starred in Brilliant Legacy (2009), one of the top-rated Korean dramas of that year. Moon's career breakthrough came with leading roles in the television period drama The Princess' Man (2011) and the action blockbuster War of the Arrows (2011); both of which were critical and commercial hits. For her performance in the latter, Moon won Best New Actress at the Grand Bell Awards and the Blue Dragon Film Awards. Moon's other notable television series include the revenge melodrama The Innocent Man (2012), the medical drama Good Doctor (2013), and the thriller melodrama Flower of Evil (2020).

== Early life ==
Moon Chae-won was born in Jung District, Daegu, South Korea. When she was in sixth grade, her family moved to Seoul. She studied Western Painting at the Chugye University for the Arts but dropped out in 2006 to pursue acting.

== Career ==
=== 2007–2010: Beginnings ===
Moon made her acting debut in 2007 in Mackerel Run, alongside fellow newcomer Lee Min-ho; they were among 60 actors who auditioned for the teen sitcom. Moon and Lee also appeared in the 2008 comedy film Our School's E.T..

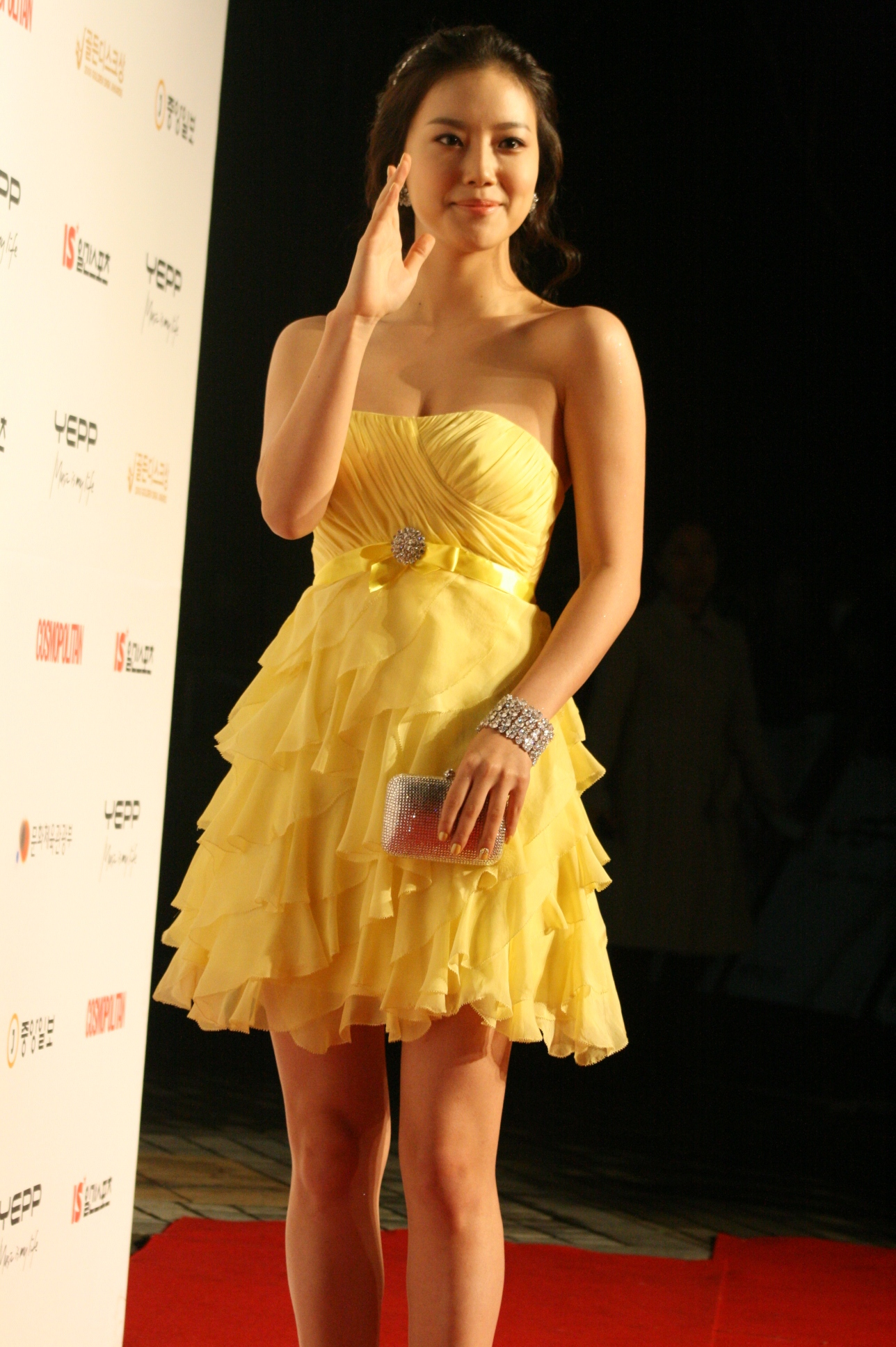
Moon at the 23rd Golden Disc Awards in 2008

Her breakthrough came in 2008 period drama Painter of the Wind. In the adaptation of Lee Jung-myung's historical fiction novel, she played a beautiful gisaeng who falls for Shin Yun-bok (played by Moon Geun-young), a female painter passing herself off as a man. Their onscreen chemistry and the homoerotic subtext of their characters' relationship was received positively, and the couple subsequently received the most votes in the Best Couple poll at the 2008 SBS Drama Awards. It was the first time in Korean drama history that two actresses won the Best Couple Award, despite the sexual conservatism of Korean network television.

Moon's further raised her profile with Brilliant Legacy, in which she played a privileged girl who alternately antagonizes and pities her stepsister. Brilliant Legacy became one of the top-rated Korean dramas of 2009, with a peak viewership rating of 47.1%. The success of the drama boosted Moon's popularity as an actress. Another supporting role followed in My Fair Lady, where she played an upbeat shoe designer who lives next door to her crush, a butler.

In October 2010, she signed with talent agency Barunson Entertainment (later renamed MSTeam). Afterwards, Moon landed her first leading role in It's Okay, Daddy's Girl, playing an immature daughter who transforms into a mature professional woman after a family tragedy.

=== 2011: Breakthrough ===
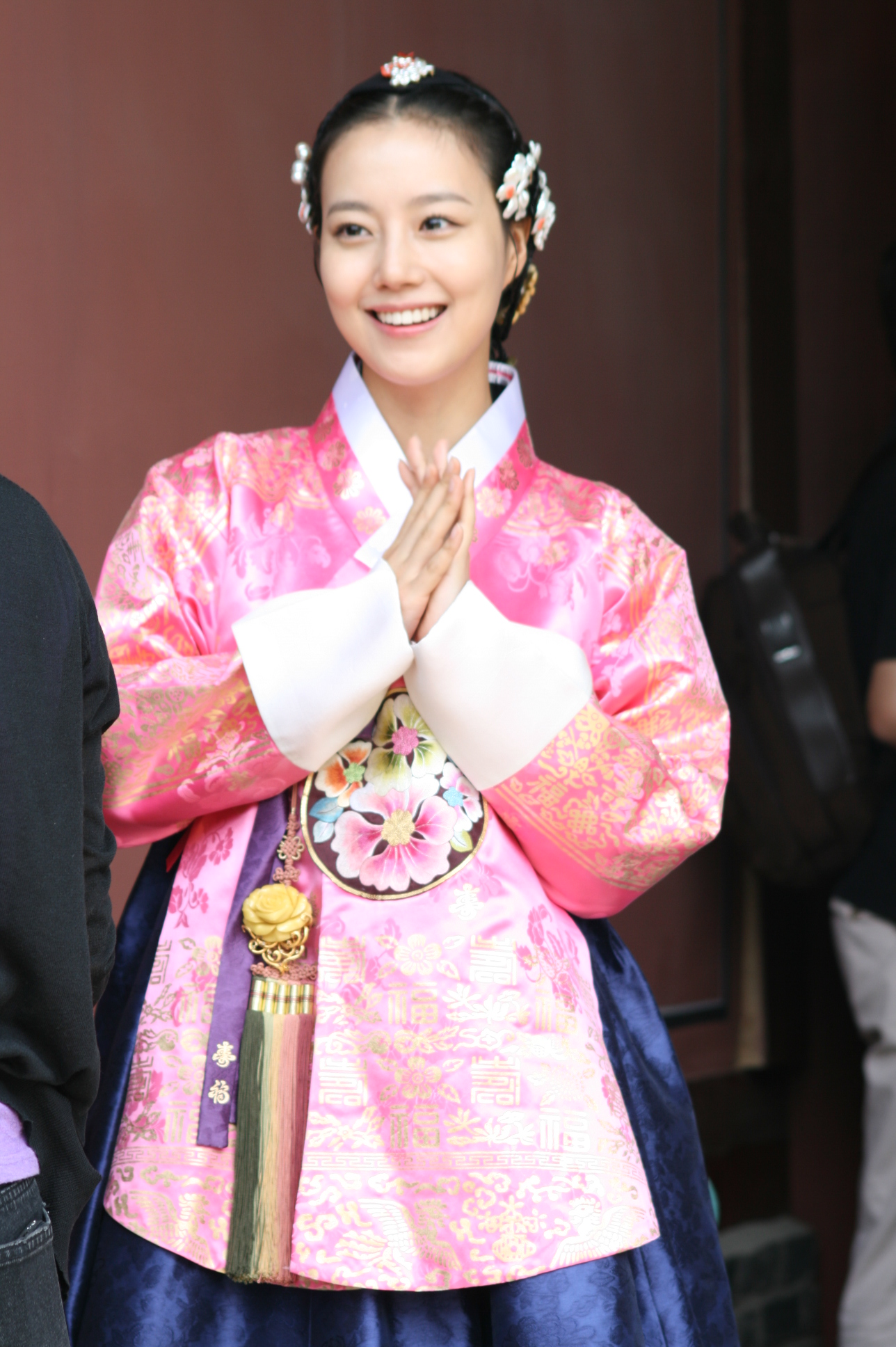
Moon at a photo-shoot for The Princess' Man in 2011

In 2011, Moon was offered the sole female role in War of the Arrows, an action blockbuster set during the Second Manchu invasion of Korea. Along with her costars Park Hae-il and Ryu Seung-ryong, Moon underwent serious archery and horse-riding lessons. War of the Arrows eventually went on to become the highest grossing Korean film of 2011, with 7.48 million admissions. Moon was praised for her portrayal of a feminine yet feisty woman abducted by a foreign army on her wedding day, yet who isn't a typical damsel in distress and instead survives by her wits and sheer will. She later received Best New Actress recognition at the Grand Bell Awards and the Blue Dragon Film Awards for her performance.

Moon returned to the small screen in the Joseon-era drama The Princess' Man, about a fictional forbidden romance between the daughter of Grand Prince Suyang and the son of Kim Chongsŏ (played by Park Si-hoo), whose fathers were real-life political enemies. The Princess' Man was well-received critically and commercially, and though initially criticized for her acting, Moon won viewers over as the series went on, eventually winning a Top Excellence Award at the year-end KBS Drama Awards. She also received a Best Dressed nod from the Korea Lifestyle Awards for giving a boost to the hanbok fashion industry via her two period projects, and was named Honorary Prosecutor by the Supreme Prosecutors' Office.

=== 2012–present: Acclaim ===
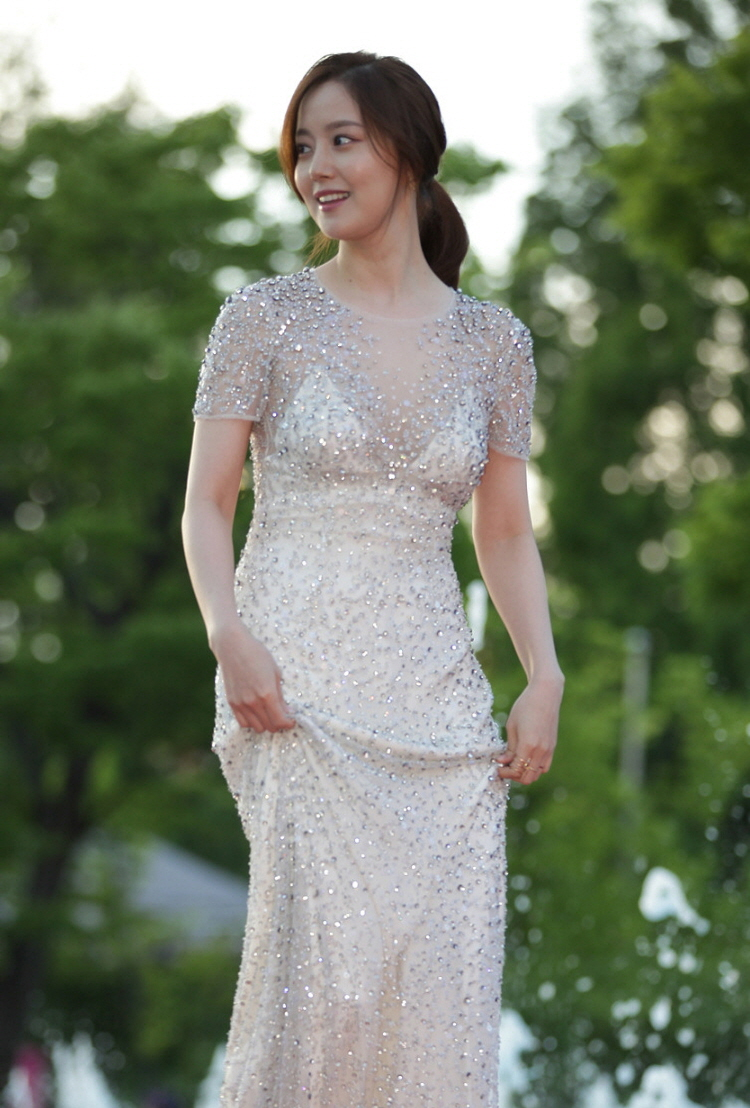
Moon on the red carpet at the 19th Bucheon International Fantastic Film Festival in 2015

In 2012, Moon starred in the Lee Kyung-hee-penned melodrama The Innocent Man opposite Song Joong-ki. She drew praise for her performance as a cold, cynical woman groomed to take over her father's conglomerate, who later reverts to helpless innocence after losing her memory. Ratings for The Innocent Man topped its timeslot during its run and led to Moon winning a Top Excellence Award at the KBS Drama Awards for the second year in a row.

This was followed by the 2013 medical drama Good Doctor revolving around an autistic savant resident (played by Joo Won). To prepare for her role as pediatric surgeon, Moon met with real-life doctors in a hospital setting, familiarizing herself with medical terms and observing surgeries first-hand.

She next starred in Awaiting, a short film directed by Kang Je-gyu. Moon played a woman separated from her husband (played by Go Soo) for sixty years by the division of North and South Korea. Awaiting was one of the four short films comprising Beautiful 2014, an omnibus project that premiered at the 38th Hong Kong International Film Festival.

Moon returned to the big screen in a 2015 romantic comedy directed by Park Jin-pyo, which reunited her with previous Brilliant Legacy costar Lee Seung-gi. In Love Forecast, she played a weather forecaster whose pretty face belies the glib-talking, hard-drinking personality underneath. The film passed the break-even point with 1.89 million viewers 3 weeks after being released and Moon won the Producer's Choice Award at Bucheon International Film Festival. She then starred opposite Yoo Yeon-seok in Mood of the Day, in which they play two strangers who meet on the KTX and spend 24 hours together in the unfamiliar city of Busan.

Moon then took on the leading female role in MBC's thriller Goodbye Mr. Black in 2016, her first television series in three years. The same year, Moon left her former agency MS Team Entertainment and signed with Namoo Actors.

In 2017, Moon was cast in the Korean adaption of the American crime drama Criminal Minds. The same year, Moon was cast in the period film Feng Shui, the third installment of the "divining art trilogy" by Han Jae-rim.

In 2018, Moon starred in the romantic fantasy drama Tale of Fairy.

In 2020, Moon was cast in the thriller melodrama Flower of Evil, reuniting with Criminal Minds co-star Lee Joon-gi.

In 2021, Moon joined the cast of the comedy film No Kids alongside Kwon Sang-woo. Later in November 2021, Moon signed with YNK Entertainment after the expiration of her contract with the original agency. In December 2021, Moon participated in Korea's first audio drama Floor with Lee Je-hoon and Jeong Jun-ha.

In 2023, Moon made her return to the small screen with the SBS drama Payback: Money and Power, her return to terrestrial television in seven years since 2016. Later in the year in April, Moon made a special appearance in the SBS drama Taxi Driver 2.

In March 2025, Moon signed with new agency Blitzway Studios.

== Ambassadorship ==
In January 2012, Moon was appointed as an honorary prosecutor by the Supreme Prosecutors' Office for building social reputation and trust with the public, alongside Lee Min-ho.

== Personal life ==
On April 15, 2026, it was confirmed that Moon would marry her non-celebrity boyfriend in June. Moon married on June 28.

== Filmography ==
=== Film ===
Year	Title	Role	Notes	Ref.
2008	Our School's E.T.	Lee Eun-shil		
2011	War of the Arrows	Choi Ja-in		
2014	Awaiting	Yeon-hee	Short film from Beautiful 2014	
2015	Love Forecast	Kim Hyun-woo		
2016	Mood of the Day	Bae Soo-jung		
2018	Fengshui	Cho-sun		
2025	Gory: A Horror Tale	Chae-won		
2026	Heartman: Rock and Love	Han Bo-na		

=== Television series ===
Year	Title	Role	Notes	Ref.
2007	Reconstruction of Love	Young Hwang Hyo-eun	Episode 2	
2007	Mackerel Run	Min Yoon-seo		
2008	Painter of the Wind	Jung-hyang		
2009	Brilliant Legacy	Yoo Seung-mi		
2009	My Fair Lady	Yeo Eui-joo		
2010	Road No. 1	Min Young-jin	Cameo (Episode 20)	
2010	It's Okay, Daddy's Girl	Eun Chae-ryung		
2011	The Princess' Man	Lee Se-ryung		
2012	The Innocent Man	Seo Eun-gi		
2013	Good Doctor	Cha Yoon-seo		
2016	Goodbye Mr. Black	Swan		
2017	Criminal Minds	Ha Seon-woo		
2018	Tale of Fairy	Sun Ok-nam		
2020	Flower of Evil	Cha Ji-won		
2023	Payback: Money and Power	Park Joon-kyung		
2023	Taxi Driver 2	Oh Mi-seo	Cameo (Episode 16)	

=== Web series ===
Year	Title	Role	Notes	Ref.
2021	Floor	Shin Ji-ho	Audio drama	

=== Music video appearances ===
Year	Title	Artist	Ref.
2008	"Parting Once Again"	Sung Si-kyung	

== Discography ==
=== Soundtrack appearances ===
Title	Year	Album
"Clementine"	2011	It's Okay, Daddy's Girl OST

== Accolades ==
=== Awards and nominations ===
Name of the award ceremony, year presented, category, nominee of the award, and the result of the nomination
Award ceremony	Year	Category	Nominee / Work	Result	Ref.
APAN Star Awards	2012	Excellence Award, Actress	The Innocent Man	Nominated	
APAN Star Awards	2013	Excellence Award, Actress	Good Doctor	Nominated	
APAN Star Awards	2021	KT Seezn Star Award	Flower of Evil	Nominated	
APAN Star Awards	2021	Popularity Award, Actress	Flower of Evil	Nominated	
APAN Star Awards	2023	Excellence Award, Actress	Payback: Money and Power	Nominated	
Asia Artist Awards	2020	Popularity Award, Actress	Flower of Evil	Nominated	
Asian Jewelry Awards	2011	Diamond Award, Actress category	Moon Chae-won	Won	
Baeksang Arts Awards	2009	Best New Actress – Television	Painter of the Wind	Nominated	
Baeksang Arts Awards	2012	Best Actress – Television	The Princess' Man	Nominated	
Blue Dragon Film Awards	2011	Best New Actress	War of the Arrows	Won	
Bucheon International Fantastic Film Festival	2015	Producers' Choice Award	Love Forecast	Won	
Consumer Rights Day KCA Culture and Entertainment Awards	2023	Actor of the Year - Drama	Payback: Money and Power	Won	
Grand Bell Awards	2011	Best New Actress	War of the Arrows	Won	
KBS Drama Awards	2009	Best New Actress	My Fair Lady	Nominated	
KBS Drama Awards	2011	Best Couple Award	Moon Chae-won with Park Si-hoo; The Princess' Man	Won	
KBS Drama Awards	2011	Popularity Award, Actress	The Princess' Man	Won	
KBS Drama Awards	2011	Top Excellence Award, Actress	The Princess' Man	Won	
KBS Drama Awards	2011	Excellence Award, Actress in a Mid-length Drama	The Princess' Man	Nominated	
KBS Drama Awards	2012	Best Couple Award	Moon Chae-won with Song Joong-ki; The Innocent Man	Won	
KBS Drama Awards	2012	Netizen's Award	The Innocent Man	Won	
KBS Drama Awards	2012	Top Excellence Award, Actress	The Innocent Man	Won	
KBS Drama Awards	2012	Excellence Award, Actress in a Mid-length Drama	The Innocent Man	Nominated	
KBS Drama Awards	2013	Best Couple Award	Moon Chae-won with Joo Won; Good Doctor	Won	
KBS Drama Awards	2013	Excellence Award, Actress in a Mid-length Drama	Good Doctor	Won	
KBS Drama Awards	2013	Popularity Award, Actress	Good Doctor	Won	
KBS Drama Awards	2013	Top Excellence Award, Actress	Good Doctor	Nominated	
Korea Best Dressed Swan Awards	2011	Best Dressed, TV Actress category	Moon Chae-won	Won	
Korean Culture and Entertainment Awards	2008	Best New Actress (TV)	Painter of the Wind	Won	
Korean Culture and Entertainment Awards	2011	Excellence Award, Actress	War of the Arrows	Won	
Korean Culture and Entertainment Awards	2011	Top Excellence Award, Actress	The Princess' Man	Won	
Korea Drama Awards	2013	Top Excellence Award, Actress	Good Doctor	Nominated	
Korea Lifestyle Awards	2011	Best Dressed of the Year	Moon Chae-won	Won	
MBC Drama Awards	2016	Top Excellence Award, Actress in a Miniseries	Goodbye Mr. Black	Nominated	
Monte-Carlo Television Festival	2013	Outstanding Actress in a Drama Series	The Princess' Man	Nominated	
SBS Drama Awards	2008	Best Couple Award	Moon Chae-won with Moon Geun-young; Painter of the Wind	Won	
SBS Drama Awards	2008	New Star Award	Painter of the Wind	Won	
SBS Drama Awards	2010	Excellence Award, Actress in a Special Planning Drama	It's Okay, Daddy's Girl	Nominated	
SBS Drama Awards	2023	Top Excellence Award, Actress in a Miniseries-Action / Genre Drama	Payback: Money and Power	Won	
The Seoul Awards	2018	Popularity Award, Actress	Fengshui	Nominated	

=== Listicles ===
Name of publisher, year listed, name of listicle, and placement
Publisher	Year	Listicle	Placement	Ref.
Korean Film Council	2021	Korean Actors 200 (Note: Introduces 200 actors that best represent the present and future of Korean cinema to the people in the film industry all over the world.)	Included	
