= Norigae (film) =

- Theatrical poster
- Directed by: Choi Seung-ho
- Written by: Choi Seung-ho
- Produced by: Lee Jae-sik
- Starring: Ma Dong-seok; Lee Seung-yeon; Min Ji-hyun
- Cinematography: Park Jung-hoon
- Edited by: Park Ji-hyeon
- Music by: Ahn Hye-sook
- Distributed by: Invent D
- Release date: April 18, 2013
- Running time: 100 minutes
- Country: South Korea
- Language: Korean

Norigae (Korean: 노리개) is a 2013 South Korean legal drama thriller film based on the story of Jang Ja-yeon. The film depicts the darker side of the Korean entertainment industry including the casting couch and sexual abuse.

Min Ji-hyun received a Best New Actress nomination at the 50th Grand Bell Awards in 2013.

== Cast ==
- Ma Dong-seok as Lee Jang-ho
- Lee Seung-yeon as Kim Mi-hyun
- Min Ji-hyun as Jung Ji-hee
- Lee Do-ah as Go Da-ryung
- Seo Ho-chul as Jung Jin-seok
- Seo Tae-hwa as Lee Sung-ryul
- Gi Ju-bong as Hyun Sung-bong
- Park Yong-soo as Yoon Ki-nam
- Jang Hyuk-jin as Director Choi Chul-soo
- Kim Kwang-young as Lawyer Kim Gi-seok
- Yang Young-jo as Jin Jong-chul
- Hwang Tae-kwang as Cha Jung-hyuk
- Byun Yo-han as Park Ji-hoon
- Song Sam-dong as Oh Jin-tae
- Kim Dae-heung as Jeon Tae-won
- Ha Si-eun as Yoo Yeon-soo
- Kim Won-hee as Lee Jin-seo
- Choi Gyo-sik as Subsection chief Gong
- Kim Young-ran as Da-ryung's mother
