= She's on Duty =

- She's on Duty poster
- Hangul: 잠복근무
- Hanja: 潛伏勤務
- RR: Jambokgeunmu
- MR: Chambokkŭnmu
- Directed by: Park Kwang-chun
- Written by: Jung Yong-ki
- Produced by: Kim Ik-sang; Jung Hoon-tak; Im Hee-cheol
- Starring: Kim Sun-a; Gong Yoo; Nam Sang-mi
- Cinematography: Park Hyun-cheol
- Edited by: Lee Hyun-mi
- Music by: Choi Wan-hee
- Distributed by: Showbox
- Release date: March 17, 2005
- Running time: 111 minutes
- Country: South Korea
- Language: Korean
- Box office: US$9 million

She's on Duty (Korean: 잠복근무; RR: Jambokgeunmu; lit. 'Stakeout; Undercover') is a 2005 South Korean action comedy film about a police detective (Kim Sun-a) who goes undercover in a high school to befriend the daughter (Nam Sang-mi) of an elusive gangster.

Despite being heavily marketed, the film was generally considered a box office disappointment.

== Plot ==
Chun Jae-in, an orphan-turned-police detective, is assigned a job to go undercover in a high school to befriend Seung-hee, the daughter of notorious gangster Cha Young-jae, and protect her from any of her father's enemies who may want to use her as bait to get Cha Young-jae to do what they want, as well as get information about her father's work from her. At first, Jae-in is very reluctant to accept the job; however, her uncle, also a detective, pushes her at the last minute to take it. Jae-in is considered a loser when she first steps into her class, and the gang girls confront her afterward and challenge her to a fight at the backyard of the school. Jae-in, being a policewoman, easily beats them up. This earns her some sort of respect, although what Jae-in really wants is Seung-hee's friendship. She eventually gets this with the help of Kang No-young, a handsome classmate and next-door neighbor who she starts to like; however, Jae-in thinks her crush is wrong because of their age difference.

Meanwhile, a new teacher arrives at their school. Jae-in later is informed that he is also an undercover agent, working on her side. She becomes slightly suspicious of him and vaguely recognizes his face.

One day after school, Jae-in and other policemen spot Cha Young-jae outside an airport; they rush to catch him, but his rivals are also on the chase. They meet up in the parking lot, where Cha Young-jae is trapped. Suddenly a mysterious motorcycle rider speeds into the middle of the group and his motorcycle produces white smoke, therefore allowing Cha Young-jae to get away. Jae-in and other police go after the motorcycle driver, since Cha Young-jae has already gotten away. The undercover teacher also happens to be at the event and shoots at the motorcycle driver, but the driver gets away. Jae-in rushes after him, but the undercover teacher puts a gun to her head. She assumes it is not serious and runs after the driver, but all she finds is a watch strangely identical to that of No-young's. When she gets home, she knocks at No-young's door and confronts him about his watch. No-young shrugs it off and is playful; however, once he gets inside his apartment, he takes off his shirt, revealing a bullet wound to the camera. Jae-in does not know of this, but she suspects that No-young is also undercover as a spy.

Jae-in increasingly becomes more suspicious of No-young, although she is still head-over-heels about him. One day she challenges him to a Judo match during a physical education class at school. During the match, they vocally argue, although none of their classmates or the teacher seems to notice; by the end of the match, they both know of each other's real position as undercover agents. Jae-in thereafter confesses to Seung-hee that she is not really a schoolgirl, which in turn gets Seung-hee very upset.

Jae-in then receives news: her beloved uncle has been stabbed by an unknown person. She sobs, overcome with grief at the loss of her only family. The camera then shows her with Seung-hee in a car with a fellow policeman. The policeman betrays Jae-in and Seung-hee and leads them to the site where Cha Young-jae has been captured and is meeting with a rival gang leader. No-young arrives, and Jae-in teams up with him to fight off everyone. Jae-in goes to capture the rival gang leader; however, as she is handcuffing him, a gun is put to her head. She turns to see the undercover teacher, who was supposed to be on her side. He reveals to her that he was the one who stabbed her uncle, and she becomes overcome with rage. Meanwhile, No-young is wounded and running out of energy; as an undercover spy, he cannot reveal himself, for he would get caught. He slips away quietly as Jae-in punches the undercover teacher again and again. A police officer finally handcuffs the undercover teacher and leads him away. Cha Young-jae is sent off to an emergency room in an ambulance with Seung-hee, and Jae-in receives news that her uncle will get better.

The movie then cuts to a scene where Jae-in is undercover once again. It has been some time since the Cha Young-jae case, although the movie does not specifically say how long. This time, Jae-in is undercover as a singing nun. She bolts after a criminal down alleys and streets; finally, when she catches up with the criminal, she realizes he has already been knocked out by someone. She looks around and discovers No-young. She starts to punch him, but he blocks it. They reconcile and kiss.

== Cast ==
- Kim Sun-a as Detective Chun Jae-in
- Gong Yoo as Kang No-young
- Nam Sang-mi as Cha Seung-hee
- Roh Joo-hyun as Detective Chun
- Ha Jung-woo as Detective Jo
- Kim Sang-ho as Detective Kang
- Park Sang-myun as Homeroom teacher
- Kim Kap-soo as Detective Cha Young-jae
- Oh Kwang-rok as Bae Doo-sang
- Hong Soo-ah as Jo Hye-ryung
- Choi Bool-am as Chief prosecutor
- Kim Ji-woo as Ja-kyung, female stowaway in opening scene
- Moon Seo-yeon as So-young
- Moon Won-joo as Sung-jin
- Jung Man-sik as Mangchi ("Hammer")
- Kim Sung-oh as Bongeo ("Carp")
- Lee Eon-jeong as Doo-sang's gangster
- Ahn Hyung-joon as Doo-sang's gangster
- Lee Beom-soo as College math professor answering Jae-in's high school exams (cameo)
- Dong Hyun-bae
