= Park Kwang-chun =

South Korean film director

- Born: May 24, 1967 (age 59); South Korea
- Other name: K.C. Park
- Education: New York University
- Occupations: Film director, screenwriter
- Years active: 1998-present

Korean name
- Hangul: 박광춘
- RR: Bak Gwangchun
- MR: Pak Kwangch'un

Park Kwang-chun, also known as K.C. Park (born May 24, 1967) is a South Korean film director. He attended the film school at New York University and worked as an assistant director on Kang Je-gyu's The Gingko Bed (1996). Park directed the special effects-intensive fantasy blockbuster The Soul Guardians (1998), romance drama Madeleine (2003), comedies She's on Duty (2005) and Our School's E.T. (2008), and horror mystery Natural Burials (2012; before its theatrical release, it first aired as a 2-episode TV movie on cable channel MBN).

== Filmography ==
- The Gingko Bed (1996) - assistant director, actor
- The Soul Guardians (1998) - director, screenplay
- Madeleine (2003) - director, script editor
- She's on Duty (2005) - director, script editor
- Our School's E.T. (2008) - director, script editor
- Natural Burials (2012) - director
