= Our School's E.T. =

- Theatrical poster
- Hangul: 울학교 이티
- Hanja: 울學校 이티
- RR: Ulhakgyo iti
- MR: Urhakkyo it'i
- Directed by: Park Kwang-chun
- Written by: Choi Jin-won
- Story by: Lee Hyeon-cheol
- Produced by: Choi Yong-gi; Park Bong-su
- Starring: Kim Soo-ro; Lee Han-wi; Baek Sung-hyun; Park Bo-young; Lee Min-ho; Moon Chae-won; Lee Chan-ho; Kim Sung-ryung
- Cinematography: Choi Deok-kyu
- Edited by: Shin Min-kyung
- Music by: Choi Man-sik
- Production companies: Courage Films; DCG Plus
- Distributed by: SK Telecom
- Release date: September 11, 2008
- Running time: 120 minutes
- Country: South Korea
- Language: Korean
- Box office: US$3.6 million

Our School's E.T. (Korean: 울학교 이티; RR: Ulhakgyo iti) is a 2008 South Korean comedy-drama film directed by Park Kwang-chun (also known as K.C. Park). It stars Kim Soo-ro as an unconventional, "alien-like" high school P.E. teacher whose position is put at stake when the school adopts a new policy to boost English education, so he decides that becoming an English teacher (E.T.) overnight is his only hope.

== Synopsis ==
Chun Sung-geun (Kim Soo-ro) is a gym teacher of a private high school in an upscale district where competition is heated among students to enter top colleges. Called "E.T." by his students because of his quirky appearance and behavior, he is a teacher who has lived life his own lazy, ignorant way for years without any worries. But one day he's hit with a crisis: At the school's board meeting, a parent requests that the school get rid of "useless" gym classes and expand the hours for English classes. The school decides to hire another English teacher— at the cost of a gym teacher. In danger of losing his position, he remembers by chance that he obtained a license to teach English a decade ago. The school board president tells him to pass a test in order for her to acknowledge it. So Sung-geun, who hasn't spoken (much less taught) English for ten years, faces the near-impossible task of becoming an English teacher within two weeks. His only weapon is his amazingly incomparable physical strength, and with the help of a few students who understand his warm heart, the simpleton Sung-geun begins his rigorous training to exercise his brain "muscles" to master English in his journey to become the school's E.T.

== Cast ==
- Kim Soo-ro as Chun Sung-geun
- Lee Han-wi as Principal Joo Ho-shik
- Baek Sung-hyun as Baek Jung-goo
- Park Bo-young as Han Song-yi
- Lee Min-ho as Oh Sang-hoon
- Moon Chae-won as Lee Eun-shil
- Lee Chan-ho as Ok Ki-ho
- Kim Sung-ryung as school board director Lee
- Kim Hyeong-beom as Cha Seung-ryong, English teacher
- Kim Ki-bang as "Meok-tong" (meaning hard-headed)
- Park Jin-taek as Jin-gook
- Kim Young-ok as Sung-geun's mother
- Kim Byeong-ok as president of publishing company
- Ha Jung-woo as handsome doctor (cameo)
- Jang Hee-soo as Ki-ho's mother
- Lee Yong-yi as Eun-shil's mother
- Lee Hyung-kwon as Vice principal
- Gong Ho-seok as Teacher Choi
- Lee Chan-young as Byeong-jin
- Oh Yeon-seo as Soo-jin
- Maeng Bong-hak as Vice principal of countryside school
- Choi Yoon-jung as Yoon-jung
- Jeon In-geol as Kyeong-sam
- Kim Dong-beom as Je-dong
- Min Ji-hyun as Ki-ho's seat partner
- Kim Jae-rok as math teacher
- Jung Jong-yeol as music teacher
- Lee Sa-bi as chemistry teacher
- Yoo Jeong-ho as English Kim
- Kim Si-hyang as Sang-hoon's girlfriend
- Oh Soon-tae as Jo Ba-nom
