= Kim Soo-ro =

South Korean actor (born 1970)

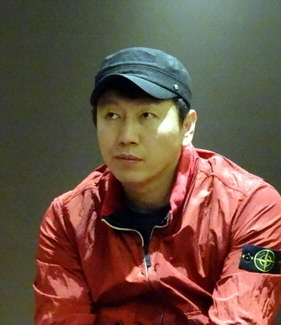
- Kim in October 2014
- Born: Kim Sang-joong; May 7, 1970 (age 56); Anseong, Gyeonggi Province, South Korea
- Other name: Kim Soo-ro
- Education: Dongguk University - Theater
- Occupation: Actor
- Years active: 1993–present
- Agent: S.M. Culture & Contents
- Spouse: Lee Kyung-hwa (m. 2006)

Korean name
- Hangul: 김상중
- Hanja: 金上中
- RR: Gim Sangjung
- MR: Kim Sangjung

Stage name
- Hangul: 김수로
- Hanja: 金秀路
- RR: Gim Suro
- MR: Kim Suro

Kim Soo-ro (Korean: 김수로; born Kim Sang-joong on May 7, 1970) is a South Korean actor.

== Career ==
=== Early career ===
Kim Soo-ro studied Theater at the Seoul Institute of the Arts and Dongguk University, then joined the Mokwha Repertory Company. In 1993, he made his cinematic debut with a minor role in Two Cops, and became known for being a scene-stealing supporting actor, especially in comedies such as The Foul King, Hi! Dharma!, Fun Movie and S Diary.

With Vampire Cop Ricky in 2006, Kim began starring in leading roles, and this was followed by the films A Bold Family, Our School's E.T., Death Bell 2: Bloody Camp, The Quiz Show Scandal, Romantic Heaven, and Ghost Sweepers. He also appeared in the television series Master of Study and A Gentleman's Dignity.

=== Kim Soo-ro's Project ===
In 2009, it was The Lower Depths, a play by Maxim Gorky considered to be one of the most important works of Russian Socialist realism, that drew Kim back to the theater. Kim made his first foray into producing plays with Lee Gi-dong Gymnasium in 2010 (which he also starred in), and its commercial success led him to establish the Kim Su-ro Project in 2011, which aims to produce original works by local playwrights. His first production, Audacious Romance starring Lee Hyun-jin, was a hit and laid the foundation for succeeding productions such as Love Generation, and the musicals Coffee Prince, Black Mary Poppins, and Agatha. Kim starred in another restaging of The Lower Depths in 2014, which is his company's ninth production.

== Filmography ==
=== Film ===
| Year | Title | Role | Notes |
|---|---|---|---|
| 1993 | Two Cops | Young Cadet | |
| 1998 | Two Cops 3 | | |
| 1999 | Shiri | Ahn Hyeon-cheol | |
| 1999 | Attack the Gas Station | Food Delivery Man | |
| 2000 | The Foul King | Yoo Bi-ho | |
| 2000 | Why Do I Want to Be a Boxing Referee? | | Short film |
| 2000 | Bichunmoo | Ashin | |
| 2000 | Libera Me | | |
| 2001 | Last Present | Yoo-sik | Cameo |
| 2001 | Kick the Moon | | Cameo |
| 2001 | Hi! Dharma! | Wang Ku-ra | |
| 2001 | The Last Witness | | |
| 2001 | Volcano High | Jang Ryang | |
| 2002 | Fun Movie | | |
| 2003 | Madeleine | Mah-ho | |
| 2004 | Taegukgi | Anti-Communist Federation Member | Cameo |
| 2004 | Dance with the Wind | Man-su | |
| 2004 | Windstruck | Hostage Taker | Cameo |
| 2004 | S Diary | Jeong-seok | |
| 2005 | A Bold Family | Myung-gyu | |
| 2005 | All for Love | Park Sung-won | |
| 2005 | Shadowless Sword | | Cameo |
| 2006 | Vampire Cop Ricky | Na Do-yeol | |
| 2006 | Detective Mr. Gong | | Cameo |
| 2006 | A Cruel Attendance | Dong-cheol | |
| 2007 | Big Bang | Yang Chul-gon | |
| 2008 | Life Is Cool | Baek Il-kwon | Rotoscoped animation |
| 2008 | Our School's E.T. | Chun Sung-geun | |
| 2009 | Five Senses of Eros | Bong Jan-woon | |
| 2009 | The Descendants of Hong Gil-dong | Lee Jeong-min | |
| 2009 | Take Off | Loan Shark Boss | |
| 2010 | Attack the Gas Station 2 | Ha Re-yi | Cameo |
| 2010 | Death Bell 2: Bloody Camp | Teacher Cha | |
| 2010 | The Quiz Show Scandal | Lee Do-yeob | |
| 2011 | Romantic Heaven | Song Min-gyu | |
| 2011 | Mr. Idol | Sa Hee-moon | |
| 2011 | My Way | Microphone Man | Cameo |
| 2012 | I Am the King | Warrior Hwang-goo | |
| 2012 | Ghost Sweepers | Teacher Park | |
| 2013 | Top Star | Choi Kang-chul | |
| 2014 | Awaiting | | Short film |
| 2017 | Along with the Gods: The Two Worlds | Cat Girl's Father | Cameo |

=== Television series ===
| Year | Title | Role | Notes/Ref. |
|---|---|---|---|
| 2007 | Thank You | Dr. Oh's brother | Cameo (Episode 16) |
| 2008 | Fight | | Cameo |
| 2010 | Master of Study | Kang Seok-ho | |
| 2012 | A Gentleman's Dignity | Im Tae-san | |
| 2013 | My Love from the Star | Lee Hyung-wook | Cameo (Episode 5) |
| 2015 | Reply 1988 | Snack Shop Owner | Cameo (Episode 3) |
| 2016 | Come Back Mister | Han Gi-tak | |
| 2018 | The Miracle We Met | Cathedral priest | Cameo |
| 2019 | Melting Me Softly | Yoo Ji Min [Panelist] | Cameo (Episode 6) |
| 2021 | Inspector Koo | Gotham | Cameo (Episode 5–7) |
| 2022 | Woori the Virgin | Choi Seong-il | |
| 2022 | Behind Every Star | himself | Cameo (Episode 6) |

=== Variety show ===
| Date | Title | Notes/Ref. |
|---|---|---|
| 2008–2010 | Family Outing | Regular cast member |
| 2010 | Hero's Challenge | Host |
| 2010 | Celebrities Goes to School | MBLAQ's Teacher |
| 2011 | Talent Sharing Project DREAM | |
| 2012 | God of Victory | Host |
| 2012 | My Queen | Co-host with Kim Min-jong |
| 2013–2015 | Real Men | Regular cast member |
| 2013 | Dancing 9 | Judge |
| 2017–2018 | Wizard of Nowhere | Regular cast member |
| 2018 | Sea Police | Cast member |
| 2019 | Let's Go, Man Soo Ro | Football Club Owner |
| 2021 | My Neighborhood Class | Cast Member |
| 2022 | Mystery Club | Host |

== Theater ==
| Year | Title | Role | Notes/Ref. |
|---|---|---|---|
| 1994 | Baekma River in the Moonlight | | |
| 1995 | Romeo and Juliet | | |
| 2009 | The Lower Depths | Vaska Pepel | |
| 2010-2011 | Lee Gi-dong Gymnasium | | Also the producer |
| 2013 | Europe Blog | Jong-il | |
| 2014 | The Lower Depths | The Actor | Also the producer |
| 2015 | Taxi Driver | | |
| 2022 | Come Back | Restaurant owner | |
| 2022–2023 | The Seagull | Do-reun | |
| 2023 | Wonderful Hill | | |

== Awards and nominations ==
| Year | Award | Category | Nominated work | Result |
|---|---|---|---|---|
| 2001 | 22nd Blue Dragon Film Awards | Best Supporting Actor | Hi! Dharma! | Nominated |
| 2002 | 23rd Blue Dragon Film Awards | Best Supporting Actor | Volcano High | Nominated |
| 2004 | 41st Grand Bell Awards | Best Supporting Actor | Dance with the Wind | Nominated |
| 2008 | SBS Entertainment Awards | PD Award | Family Outing | Won |
| 2010 | 46th Baeksang Arts Awards | Best Actor (TV) | Master of Study | Nominated |
| 2010 | 3rd Korea Drama Awards | Best Actor | Master of Study | Nominated |
| 2010 | KBS Drama Awards | Excellence Award, Actor in a Miniseries | Master of Study | Won |
| 2012 | SBS Drama Awards | Excellence Award, Actor in a Weekend/Serial Drama | A Gentleman's Dignity | Won |
| 2012 | MBC Entertainment Awards | Excellence Award in a Variety Show | God of Victory | Nominated |
| 2013 | MBC Entertainment Awards | Top Excellence Award | Real Men | Won |
| 2013 | MBC Entertainment Awards | Excellence Award in a Variety Show | Real Men | Nominated |
| 2014 | MBC Entertainment Awards | Grand Prize (Daesang) | Real Men | Nominated |
| 2014 | MBC Entertainment Awards | Top Excellence Award in a Variety Show | Real Men | Nominated |
| 2014 | MBC Entertainment Awards | Friendship Award | Real Men | Won |
