= List of awards and nominations received by My Love from the Star =

This is the list of awards and nominations received by My Love from the Star.

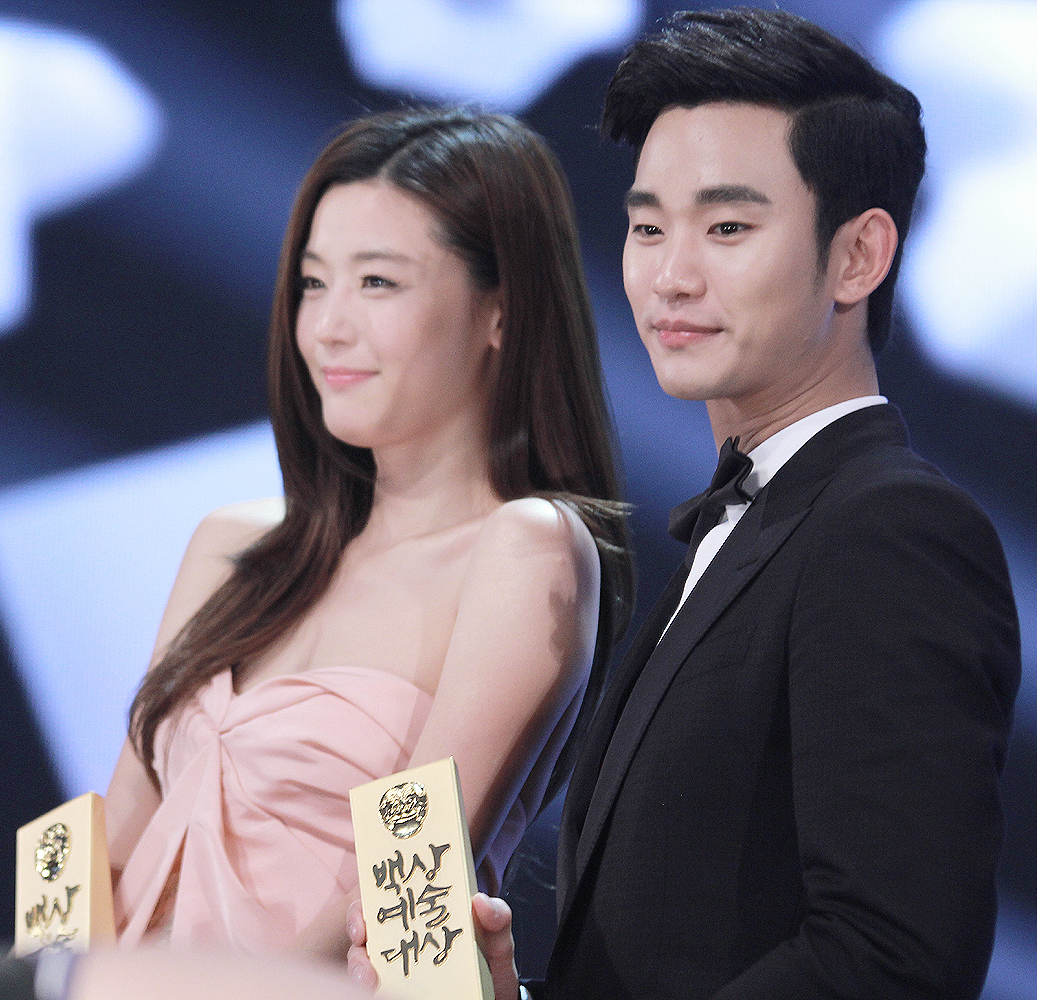
Kim Soo-hyun and Jun Ji-hyun at the 50th Baeksang Arts Awards

== Awards and nominations ==
Year	Award Category	Recipient	Result	Ref.
50th Baeksang Arts Awards
2014	Grand Prize (Daesang) for TV	Jun Ji-hyun	Won	
2014	Best Drama	My Love From the Star	Nominated	
2014	Best Director (TV)	Jang Tae-yoo, Oh Chung-hwan	Nominated	
2014	Best Screenplay (TV)	Park Ji-eun	Nominated	
2014	Best Actor (TV)	Kim Soo-hyun	Nominated	
2014	Best Actress (TV)	Jun Ji-hyun	Nominated	
2014	Most Popular Actor (TV)	Kim Soo-hyun	Won	
2014	Most Popular Actor (TV)	Park Hae-jin	Nominated	
2014	Most Popular Actress (TV)	Jun Ji-hyun	Nominated	
2014	Best OST	My Destiny - Lyn	Won	
20th Shanghai Television Festival Magnolia Awards
2014	Silver Award, Best Foreign TV Series	My Love From the Star	Won	
41st Korea Broadcasting Awards
2014	Best Actor/Actress	Jun Ji-hyun	Won	
9th Seoul International Drama Awards
2014	Excellent Korean Drama	My Love From the Star	Won	
2014	Outstanding Korean Actor	Kim Soo-hyun	Won	
2014	People's Choice Actor	Kim Soo-hyun	Won	
2014	Outstanding Korean Actress†	Jun Ji-hyun	Nominated	
2014	People's Choice Actress†	Jun Ji-hyun	Nominated	
2014	Outstanding Korean Drama OST	My Destiny – Lyn	Won	
2014	Outstanding Korean Drama OST	Every Moment of You – Sung Si-kyung	Nominated	
†Denotes categories which were cancelled due to award show policy. (no attendance, no award)
7th Korea Drama Awards
2014	Grand Prize (Daesang)	Kim Soo-hyun	Won	
2014	Grand Prize (Daesang)	Jun Ji-hyun	Nominated	
2014	Best Drama	My Love from the Star	Won	
2014	Best Production Director	Jang Tae-yoo, Oh Chung-hwan	Nominated	
2014	Best Screenplay	Park Ji-eun	Nominated	
2014	Excellence Award, Actor	Park Hae-jin	Nominated	
2014	Best New Actor	Ahn Jae-hyun	Won	
2014	Best New Actor	Lee Yi-kyung	Nominated	
2014	Best OST	My Destiny – Lyn	Nominated	
2014	Best OST	Hello / Goodbye – Hyolyn	Nominated	
2014	Hallyu Hot Star Award	Kim Soo-hyun	Won	
2014	Hot Star Award	Shin Sung-rok	Won	
8th Tokyo International Drama Festival
2014	Special Award for Foreign Dramas	My Love from the Star	Won	
2014	Best Actor in Asia	Kim Soo-hyun	Won	
6th MelOn Music Awards
2014	Best OST	My Destiny – Lyn	Won	
3rd APAN Star Awards
2014	Top Excellence Award, Actor in a Miniseries	Kim Soo-hyun	Won	
2014	Top Excellence Award, Actress in a Miniseries	Jun Ji-hyun	Nominated	
2014	Excellence Award, Actor in a Miniseries	Park Hae-jin	Nominated	
2014	Best Supporting Actor	Kim Chang-wan	Nominated	
2014	Best Supporting Actor	Shin Sung-rok	Nominated	
2014	Best New Actor	Ahn Jae-hyun	Nominated	
2014	Best Production Director	Jang Tae-yoo, Oh Chung-hwan	Won	
2014	Hallyu Star Award	Jun Ji-hyun	Won	
2014	Hallyu Star Award	Kim Soo-hyun	Won	
22nd Korea Culture and Entertainment Awards
2014	Excellence Award, Actor in a Drama	Shin Sung-rok	Won	
16th Mnet Asian Music Awards
2014	Best OST	My Destiny – Lyn	Won	
2014	Best OST	Every Moment of You – Sung Si-kyung	Nominated	
27th Grimae Awards
2014	Grand Prize (Daesang)	Lee Gil-bok, Jung Min-gyun (cinematographers)	Won	
2014	Best Production Director	Jang Tae-yoo, Oh Chung-hwan	Won	
2014 SBS Drama Awards
2014	Grand Prize (Daesang)	Jun Ji-hyun	Won	
2014	Grand Prize (Daesang)	Kim Soo-hyun	Nominated	
2014	Top Excellence Award, Actor in a Mid-length Drama	Kim Soo-hyun	Won	
2014	Top Excellence Award, Actress in a Mid-length Drama	Jun Ji-hyun	Nominated	
2014	Excellence Award, Actor in a Mid-length Drama	Shin Sung-rok	Won	
2014	Excellence Award, Actor in a Mid-length Drama	Park Hae-jin	Nominated	
2014	Special Award, Actor in a Mid-length Drama	Kim Chang-wan	Won	
2014	Special Award, Actress in a Mid-length Drama	Na Young-hee	Nominated	
2014	Netizen Popularity Award	Kim Soo-hyun	Won	
2014	Netizen Popularity Award	Jun Ji-hyun	Nominated	
2014	Netizen Popularity Award	Park Hae-jin	Nominated	
2014	Producer's Award	Jun Ji-hyun	Won	
2014	Top 10 Stars	Kim Soo-hyun	Won	
2014	Top 10 Stars	Jun Ji-hyun	Won	
2014	New Star Award	Ahn Jae-hyun	Won	
2014	Best Couple Award	Kim Soo-hyun and Jun Ji-hyun	Won	
29th Golden Disk Awards
2015	Best OST	Tears Like Today – Huh Gak	Won	
15th Huading Awards
2015	Best Global Actor	Kim Soo-hyun	Won	
24th Seoul Music Awards
2015	Best OST	My Destiny – Lyn	Won	
27th Korea Producers & Directors (PD) Awards
2015	Best Drama	My Love From the Star	Won	
