= Oh Chung-hwan =

South Korean drama director

- Education: Seoul National University
- Occupations: Drama director, producer
- Years active: 2006–present
- Employers: SBS (2007–2017); Studio Dragon (2018–2020); Next Scene (2021–present

Korean name
- Hangul: 오충환
- Hanja: 吳忠煥
- RR: O Chunghwan
- MR: O Ch'unghwan

Oh Chung-hwan (Korean: 오충환) is a South Korean drama television director best known for his television dramas series My Love from the Star (2013–2014), The Doctors (2016), While You Were Sleeping (2017), Hotel del Luna (2019), Start-Up (2020), Big Mouth (2022), and Castaway Diva (2023).

== Career ==
Oh began his career in the broadcasting industry through the 2006 SBS New Employee Open Recruitment for drama production director position. In 2009, Yoo worked as assistant director for directors Son Jung-hyun and Cho Young-Hwang on a 21-episode drama series called Temptation of an Angel written by Kim Soon-ok.

In 2013, Oh co-directed drama My Love from the Star with director Jang Tae-yoo.

Oh first work as lead director in full feature-length drama was in 2016 SBS medical drama The Doctors. The drama won Excellence Award in The Seoul Drama Awards 2017. When receiving the award, Oh paid tribute to the late Kim Young-ae.

In 2021, Oh and director Park Shin-woo co-founded Next Scene, a drama production company. Studio Dragon announced on March 28, 2022, that it had signed an equity investment contract with Next Scene, securing a 19.98% stake. In April 2025, Studio Dragon acquired 8,002 shares of Next Scene for 16 billion won, making it a wholly owned subsidiary.

== Filmography ==
=== Television series ===
Key
†	Denotes television productions that have not yet been released

Year	Title		Credited as			Note	Ref.
Year	English	Korean	Assistant Director	Co-director	Director	Note	Ref.
2009	Temptation of an Angel	천사의 유혹	Yes	No	No		
2010	The Miracle of Love	사랑의 기적	Yes	No	No	also acted as cameo	
2010–2011	Pure Pumpkin Flower	호박꽃 순정	Yes	No	No		
2012	History of a Salaryman	샐러리맨 초한지	Yes	No	No		
2012	Five Fingers	다섯 손가락	Yes	No	No		
2012	The Birth of a Family	가족의 탄생	No	Yes	No		
2013–2014	My Love from the Star	별에서 온 그대	No	Yes	No		
2015	Run towards Tomorrow	내일을 향해 뛰어라	No	No	Yes		
2015	A Girl Who Sees Smells	냄새를 보는 소녀	No	Yes	No		
2016	The Doctors	닥터스	No	No	Yes		
2017	While You Were Sleeping	당신이 잠든 사이에	No	No	Yes		
2019	Hotel del Luna	호텔 델루나	No	No	Yes		
2020	Start-Up	스타트업	No	No	Yes		
2022	Big Mouth	빅 마우스	No	No	Yes		
2023	Castaway Diva	무인도의 디바	No	No	Yes		
2025	Melo Movie	매로 무비	No	No	Yes	Netflix original series	
TBA	Grand Galaxy Hotel †	그랜드 갤럭시 호텔	No	No	Yes	Netflix original series	

== Casting ==
Oh frequently re-casts actors whom he has worked with on previous dramas.

Recurring casts
Actor Work	Bae Suzy	Lee Jong-suk	Kim Joo-hun	Kim Soo-hyun	Nam Da-reum	Yeo Jin-goo
The Birth of a Family						
My Love from the Star	check			check		
Run towards Tomorrow						
A Girl Who Sees Smells						
The Doctors						
While You Were Sleeping	check	check			check	
Hotel del Luna				check	check	check
Start-Up	check		check		check	check
Big Mouth		check	check			
Castaway Diva			check			

== Awards and nominations ==
Awards and nominations received by Oh
Award ceremony	Year	Category	Nominated work(s)	Result	Ref.
APAN Star Awards	2014	Best Production Director	My Love from the Star (Note: Co-directing with Jang Tae-yoo)	Won	
Baeksang Arts Awards	2014	Best Director–Television	My Love from the Star	Nominated	
Grimae Awards	2014	Best Production Director	My Love from the Star	Won	
Korea Drama Awards	2014	Best Production Director	My Love from the Star	Nominated	
Seoul International Drama Awards	2021	Outstanding Korean Drama	Start-Up	Won	

== See also ==
- Jang Tae-yoo
- Park Hye-ryun
