= 3rd APAN Star Awards =

2014 edition of award ceremony

- Date: November 15, 2014
- Site: Jeongsimhwa International Cultural Center; Chungnam National University, Daejeon
- Hosted by: Park So-yeon; Kim Sung-joo

The 3rd APAN Star Awards was held on November 15, 2014 at the Hall of Jeongsimhwa International Cultural Center, Chungnam National University in Daejeon. T-ara's Park So-yeon and Kim Sung-joo were the host of the award ceremony. First held in 2012, the annual awards ceremony recognizes the excellence in South Korea's television. The nominees were chosen from 87 Korean dramas that aired from November 1, 2013 to September 2014.

== Nominations and winners ==
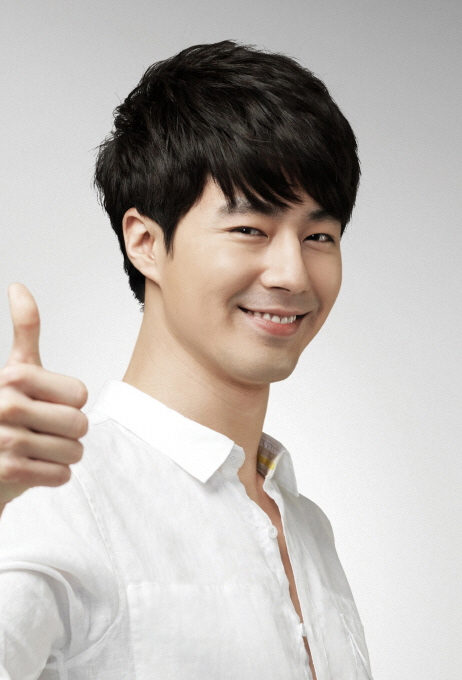
Zo In-sung — Grand Prize (Daesang) winner for It's Okay, That's Love

Winners are listed first, highlighted in boldface, and indicated with a dagger (†).

**Grand Prize**: **Zo In-sung** - **It's Okay, That's Love** †
**Top Excellence Award, Actor in a Miniseries**: **Kim Soo-hyun** - **My Love from the Star** †; Jang Hyuk - You Are My Destiny; Zo In-sung - It's Okay, That's Love; Lee Min-ho - The Heirs; Yoo Ah-in - Secret Affair	**Top Excellence Award, Actress in a Miniseries**: **Kim Hee-ae** - **Secret Affair** †; Gong Hyo-jin - It's Okay, That's Love; Jang Na-ra - You Are My Destiny; Jun Ji-hyun - My Love from the Star; Song Yoon-ah - Mama
**Top Excellence Award, Actor in a Serial Drama**: **Cho Jae-hyun** - **Jeong Do-jeon** †; Joo Jin-mo - Empress Ki; Lee Dong-wook - Hotel King; Lee Seo-jin - Wonderful Days; Yoo Dong-geun - What Happens to My Family?	**Top Excellence Award, Actress in a Serial Drama**: **Kim Hee-sun** - **Wonderful Days** †; Ha Ji-won - Empress Ki; Jang Seo-hee - Two Mothers; Lee Ji-ah - Thrice Married Woman; Lee Yu-ri - Jang Bo-ri Is Here!
**Excellence Award, Actor in a Miniseries**: **Jung Woo** - **Reply 1994** †; Ji Sung - Secret Love; Kim Woo-bin - The Heirs; Park Hae-jin - My Love from the Star; Park Yoo-chun - Three Days	**Excellence Award, Actress in a Miniseries**: **Park Shin-hye** - **The Heirs** †; Go Ara - Reply 1994; Jin Se-yeon - Doctor Stranger; Kang So-ra - Doctor Stranger; Moon Jeong-hee - Mama
**Excellence Award, Actor in a Serial Drama**: **Kim Ji-hoon** - **Jang Bo-ri Is Here!** †; Ji Chang-wook - Empress Ki; Kim Sang-kyung - What Happens to My Family?; Ok Taec-yeon - Wonderful Days; Park Yeong-gyu - Jeong Do-jeon	**Excellence Award, Actress in a Serial Drama**: **Kim Ok-vin** - **Steal Heart** †; Oh Yeon-seo - Jang Bo-ri Is Here!; Kim Ji-young - Everybody Say Kimchi; Kim Hyun-joo - What Happens to My Family?; Seo Hyun-jin - The King's Daughter, Soo Baek-hyang
**Best Supporting Actor**: **Ryu Seung-soo** - **Wonderful Days** †; Kim Chang-wan - My Love from the Star; Park Hyuk-kwon - Secret Affair; Shin Sung-rok - My Love from the Star; Sung Dong-il - Reply 1994	**Best Supporting Actress**: **Kim Hye-eun** - **Secret Affair** †; Baek Jin-hee - Empress Ki; Kim Ji-ho - Wonderful Days; Song Ok-sook - Only Love; Yoon A-jung - Empress Ki, Temptation
**Best New Actor**: **Do Kyung-soo** - **It's Okay, That's Love** †; **Son Ho-jun** - **Reply 1994** †; Ahn Jae-hyun - My Love from the Star; Baro - God's Gift: 14 Days; Park Hyung-sik - What Happens to My Family?	**Best New Actress**: **Nam Bo-ra** - **Only Love** †; **Kim Seul-gi** - **Discovery of Love** †; Kim Da-som - Melody of Love; Kyung Soo-jin - Plus Nine Boys; Min Do-hee - Reply 1994
**Best Young Actor**: **Choi Kwon-soo** - **Wonderful Days** †; **Yoon Chan-young** - **Mama** †	**Best Young Actress**: **Kim Hyun-soo** - **My Love from the Star** †; **Kim Ji-young** - **Jang Bo-ri Is Here!** †
**Best Production Director**: **Jang Tae-yoo**, **Oh Chung-hwan** - **My Love from the Star** †	**Best Writer**: **Jung Sung-joo** - **Secret Love Affair** †
**Best Original Soundtrack**: **"Goodbye My Love" (Ailee)** - **You Are My Destiny** †	**Best SNS Web Drama**: **A Hungry Woman** †
**Popular Star Award, Actor**: **Lee Kwang-soo** - **It's Okay, That's Love** †	**Popular Star Award, Actress**: **Jin Se-yeon** - **Doctor Stranger** †
**Hallyu Star Award**: **Jun Ji-hyun** - **My Love from the Star** †; **Kim Soo-hyun** - **My Love from the Star** †	**Best Dressed**: **Ji Hyun-woo** †; **Kim Yoo-ri** †
**Best Manager**: **Lee Jin-sung, King Kong Entertainment** †	**Achievement Award**: **Choi Jin-sil** †
