= My Love from Another Star =

- Based on: My Love from the Star by Park Ji-eun
- Screenplay by: Suthisa Wongyoo
- Directed by: Phawat Panangkasiri
- Starring: Nadech Kugimiya; Peranee Kongthai
- Country of origin: Thailand
- Original language: Thai
- No. of episodes: 16

Production
- Producer: Arunosha Bhanubhand
- Running time: 135 minute
- Production company: Broadcast Thai Television

Original release
- Network: Channel 3
- Release: September 17 – November 11, 2019

My Love from Another Star (Thai: ลิขิตรักข้ามดวงดาว) it is a Thai romantic-drama television series that remakes from the Korean series My Love from the Star into a Thai version. It is the first South Korean series that Channel 3 bought the rights to turn into a drama starring Nadech Kugimiya and Peranee Kongthai, produced by Broadcast Thai Television, and originally directed by Pantham Thongsang but for some reason was changed to Phawat Panangkasiri, who had great success directing the hit period drama Love Destiny in 2018.

== Production ==
Broadcast Thai Television initially appointed Pantham Thongsang as the drama director, holding a sacrifice ceremony in mid-November 2017, and filming began in the same month. Filming was stressful at first, only about 10 percent of the filming was done and then filming stopped. With Pantham resigning as director, Phawat Panangkasiri took over as director, while Phawat was directing another drama for Broadcast, which wrapped production in March 2019. It took 1 year and 2 months to film, and the filming used many special effects, all of which were made by Thai people. There was investment in building a condominium set at Nong Khaem Studio, with producers flying to see the studio used for filming in South Korea, and construction took 5–6 months with a cost of nearly 50–60 million baht. The drama was originally planned to air around May, as scheduled to air in Thailand along with China for which Channel 3 sold the rights, with Chinese subtitles.
