= My Love from the Star =

2013–2014 South Korean television series

- Promotional poster
- Hangul: 별에서 온 그대
- Lit.: You Who Came from the Stars
- RR: Byeoreseo on geudae
- MR: Pyŏresŏ on kŭdae
- Genre: Romantic comedy; Fantasy
- Created by: Moon Bo-mi; Park Ji-eun
- Written by: Park Ji-eun
- Directed by: Jang Tae-yoo; Oh Chung-hwan
- Starring: Jun Ji-hyun; Kim Soo-hyun; Park Hae-jin; Yoo In-na; Shin Sung-rok; Ahn Jae-hyun
- Opening theme: "Man From Star (Opening Title)"
- Ending theme: "My Destiny" by Lyn
- Country of origin: South Korea
- Original language: Korean
- No. of episodes: 21 (+1 special)

Production
- Executive producer: Choi Moon-suk
- Producer: Moon Bo-mi
- Cinematography: Lee Gil-bok; Jung Min-gyun
- Camera setup: Multiple-camera setup
- Running time: 60 minutes
- Production company: HB Entertainment

Original release
- Network: SBS TV
- Release: December 18, 2013 – February 27, 2014

Related
- My Love from the Star (Philippines); Likit Ruk Karm Duang Dao (Thailand); My Love from the Stars (Japan); Kau yang Berasal dari Bintang (Indonesia); Oppa, Saranghae! (Singapore)

My Love from the Star (Korean: 별에서 온 그대) is a South Korean fantasy romantic comedy television series written by Park Ji-eun and directed by Jang Tae-yoo. Produced by Choi Moon-suk and Moon Bo-mi, it stars Jun Ji-hyun, Kim Soo-hyun, Park Hae-jin, Yoo In-na, Shin Sung-rok, and Ahn Jae-hyun. It tells the story of an extraterrestrial alien who landed on Earth in 1609 during the Joseon period and 400 years later falls in love with a top female actor. The plot is originally inspired by historical records from the Annals of the Joseon Dynasty dating to autumn 1609, when residents reported sightings of unidentified flying objects across the Korean peninsula.

The series aired for 21 episodes on Seoul Broadcasting System (SBS) from December 18, 2013, to February 27, 2014. According to Nielsen Korea, it recorded an average nationwide television viewership rating of 24 percent. It garnered widespread popularity during its broadcast and sparked trends in fashion, make-up and restaurants. It has been also credited for spreading the Korean wave.

My Love from the Star received several accolades. At the 50th Baeksang Arts Awards, it received nine nominations with three wins; Jun won the Grand Prize – Television and Kim won the Most Popular Actor – Television. The series won the Korea Drama Award for Best Drama, the Seoul International Drama Award for Excellent Korean Drama and the Magnolia Award for Best Foreign Television Series.

== Plot ==
Do Min-joon is an alien who landed on Earth in 1609 during the Joseon period. He saves a girl named Seo Yi-hwa from falling off a cliff and misses his return trip to his home planet and is stranded on Earth for the next four centuries. He has a near-perfect human appearance, enhanced physical abilities involving his vision, hearing and speed, and a cynical, jaded view of human beings. Min-joon never ages and is forced to take on a new identity every ten years; he has worked as a doctor, an astronomer, a lawyer, and a banker, and is now working as a college professor.

Cheon Song-yi is a famous Hallyu actress who attained stardom as a schoolchild; her haughty demeanor has earned derision in the entertainment industry and on social media. Song-yi's spendthrift mother has mismanaged her finances and her younger brother Cheon Yoon-jae is estranged by her success. Lee Hee-kyung has been Song-yi's friend since middle school and remains in love with her but is continually rejected. In turn, Yoo Se-mi, Song-yi's childhood friend who is frequently cast in a supporting role alongside Song-yi has had a crush on Hee-kyung since middle school despite her love being unrequited. As a result, Se-mi secretly harbors a deep jealousy towards Song-yi for standing in the way of her career and love interest.

With only three months left before Min-joon's long-awaited departure to his planet of origin, Song-yi suddenly becomes his next-door neighbor in the condominium where he lives. Slowly, Min-joon finds himself entangled in Song-yi's crazy and unpredictable situations, saving her multiple times using his special powers and eventually acting as her manager due to his vast legal knowledge. He finds out that she at a young age resembles Yi-hwa, with whom he fell in love with 400 years earlier. Min-joon and Song-yi eventually fall in love; Min-joon aims to leave Earth without being emotionally attached so he tries to avoid her but fails. While Song-yi initially does not understand his impending departure, she ultimately accepts letting him go to assure his survival.

Song-yi's career goes into a downturn when her talent agency and sponsors drop her in a backlash against her recent behavior, particularly rumors that she caused the suicide of her arch-rival, actress Han Yoo-ra. Earlier at a celebrity wedding, Song-yi had discovered Yoo-ra was in a secret relationship with Lee Jae-kyung, the elder brother of Hee-kyung. Jae-kyung tries to silence Song-yi until Min-joon brokers a deal to spare her in return for burying the evidence. Jae-kyung, however, turns out to be much more dangerous than Min-joon suspected, learning to exploit Min-joon's weaknesses and injuring Se-mi's older brother, a prosecutor who is investigating Yoo-ra's suicide. Min-joon, despite being discreet in the use of his special abilities, eventually draws the attention of police while losing control of his powers as his departure date nears. While jealous of Min-joon for winning Song-yi's heart, Hee-kyung works with Min-joon to protect her from Jae-kyung.

== Cast ==
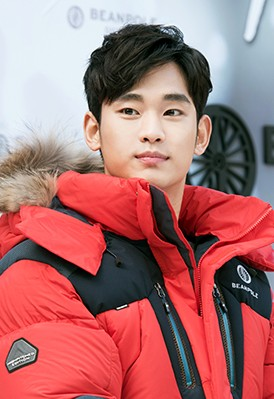
Kim Soo-hyun plays the character of an extraterrestrial alien, Do Min-joon

=== Main ===
- Jun Ji-hyun as Cheon Song-yi
  - Kim Hyun-soo as young Cheon Song-yi / Seo Yi-hwa
- Kim Soo-hyun as Do Min-joon
- Park Hae-jin as Lee Hee-kyung
  - Jo Seung-hyun as young Lee Hee-kyung
- Yoo In-na as Yoo Se-mi
  - Kim Hye-won as young Yoo Se-mi

=== Supporting ===
==== Cheon Song-yi's family ====
- Na Young-hee as Yang Mi-yeon, Song-yi's mother
- Um Hyo-sup as Cheon Min-goo, Song-yi's father
- Ahn Jae-hyun as Cheon Yoon-jae, Song-yi's younger brother
  - Jeon Jin-seo as young Cheon Yoon-jae

==== People around Do Min-joon ====
- Kim Chang-wan as Jang Young-mok, Min-joon's lawyer who serves as a close confidant and "father figure".

==== Lee Hee-kyung's family ====
- Shin Sung-rok as Lee Jae-kyung, Hee-kyung's older brother
- Lee Jung-gil as Lee Beom-joong, Hee-kyung's father and the chairman of S&C Group.
- Sung Byung-sook as Hong Eun-ah, Hee-kyung's mother

==== Yoo Se-mi's family ====
- Lee Il-hwa as Han Sun-young, Se-mi's mother
- Oh Sang-jin as Yoo Seok, Se-mi's older brother who is a prosecutor.

==== People around Cheon Song-yi ====
- Hong Jin-kyung as Bok-ja, a comic book store owner and Song-yi's high school friend.
- Jo Hee-bong as Ahn Dong-min, CEO of Song-yi's talent agency.
- Kim Bo-mi as Min-ah, Song-yi's stylist
- Kim Kang-hyun as Yoon Bum, Song-yi's manager

==== Others ====
- Kim Hee-won as Park Byung-hee, a detective who works with Yoo Seok.
- Lee Yi-kyung as Lee Shin, Jae-kyung's secretary
- Jo Se-ho as Cheol-soo, a patron of Bok-ja's comic book store who twists celebrity gossip and creates rumours.
- Nam Chang-hee as Hyuk, Cheol-soo's partner

=== Special appearances ===
- Yoo In-young as Han Yoo-ra, an actress and Cheon Song-yi's arch-rival.
- Yoo Jun-sang as Mr. Yoo, section chief at Lee Hee-kyung's workplace.
- Park Jung-ah as Noh Seo-young, an actress
- Jang Hang-jun as Park Min-kyu, a director
- Son Eun-seo as Hwang Jin-yi, a kisaeng in the Joseon era.
- Kim Soo-ro as Lee Hyung-wook, an auditor in Gangwon during Joseon era.
- Jung Eun-pyo as Yoon Sung-dong, a Joseon realtor / Yoon Sung-dong's descendant in the present time.
- Park Yeong-gyu as Heo Jun, a doctor in the Joseon era.
- Bae Suzy as Go Hye-mi, Do Min-joon's student (Note: The character appears in a short crossover scene, alluding Bae Suzy's previous work Dream High (2011), where she starred alongside Kim Soo-hyun who portrays Song Sam-dong.)
- Yeon Woo-jin as Lee Han-kyung, Lee Hee-kyung's eldest brother
- Ryu Seung-ryong as Heo Gyun, a poet in the Joseon era.
- Sandara Park as herself

== Production ==
Developed under the working title Man from the Stars (별에서 온 남자; Byeoreseo on namja), My Love from the Star was written by Park Ji-eun. She based the drama on the historical Gwanghae Journal from the Veritable Records of the Joseon Dynasty that references mysterious UFO sightings. The journal documented sightings of strange flying objects resembling Halo or washbowls in various parts of present-day Gangwon Province on August 25, 1609 (September 22 in the solar calendar). The series was directed by Jang Tae-yoo and the cinematography was handled by Lee Gil-bok and Jung Min-gyun. Produced by Choi Moon-suk and Moon Bo-mi, HB Entertainment managed the show's production.

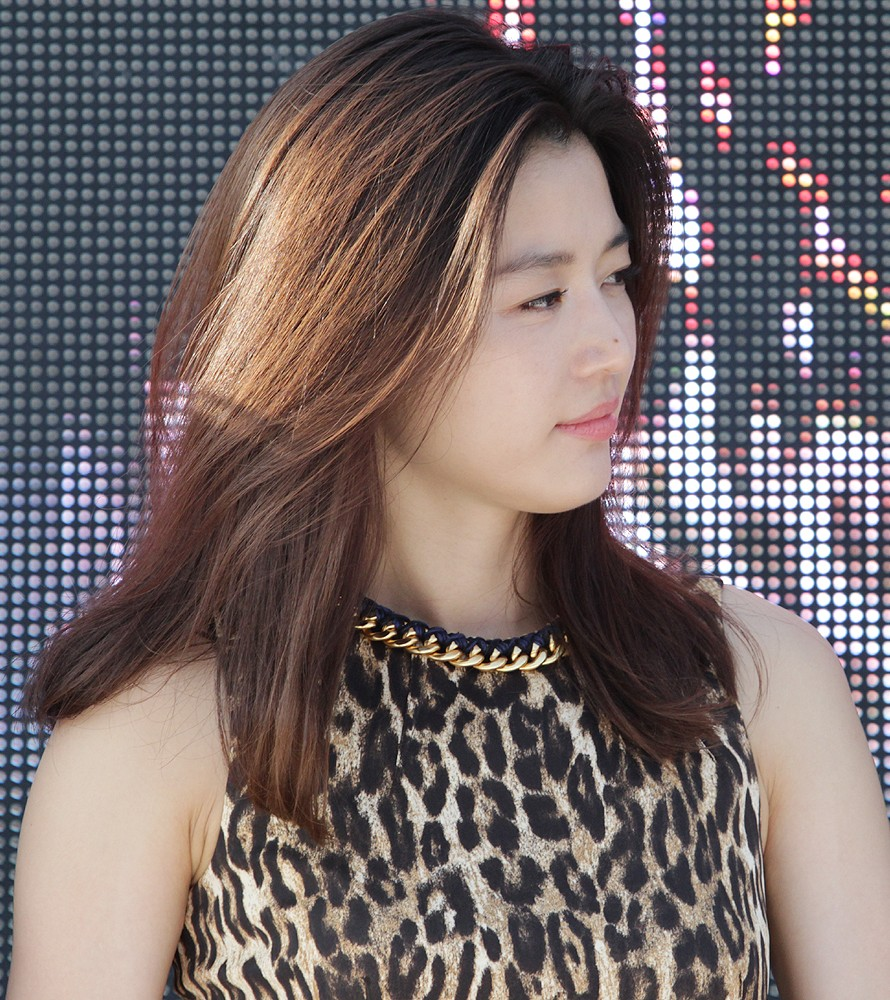
My Love from the Star marked Jun Ji-hyun's return to television after 14 years

In August 2013, media reported that Kim Soo-hyun and Jun Ji-hyun were cast in a fantasy rom-com; it is the second collaboration between Kim and Jun, coming after the successful film The Thieves (2012). It also marks Jun's small screen comeback after 14 years. Initially Park Hae-jin was cast to play Lee Jae-kyung, the antagonist, and Choi Min was cast to play his younger brother Lee Hee-kyung; but Choi Min's injury led to Park's role being changed to that of Lee Hee-kyung and Shin Sung-rok was cast as Lee Jae-kyung.

The first script reading was held on October 14, 2013, and filming began in early November 2013. The protagonist of the series possesses superpowers including the ability to teleport and stop time so special effects were needed. The crew used 60 small, special cameras to create bullet time effects. GoPro cameras were installed in a 180-degree arc and "stopped" characters were filmed from various angles. The final scene is a montage of small details and was enhanced digitally. This was the first time high-definition cameras were used to produce a television drama in South Korea.

== Original soundtrack ==
=== Album ===
My Love from the Star

Soundtrack album by Various artists
- Released: February 26, 2014
- Length: 95:11
- Languages: Korean; English
- Labels: SBS Contents Hub; LOEN Entertainment

Singles from My Love from the Star
- 1. "My Destiny" Released: December 26, 2013; 2. "Like a Star" Released: January 8, 2014; 3. "My Love from the Star" Released: January 15, 2014; 4. "Goodbye" Released: January 22, 2014; 5. "I Love You" Released: January 29, 2014; 6. "Tears Fallin' Like Today" Released: February 5, 2013; 7. "Every Moment of You" Released: February 12, 2014; 8. "If I" Released: February 19, 2014

My Love from the Star soundtrack album was released on February 26, 2014; it contains all of the singles and background tracks from the series. The album debuted on the weekly Gaon Album Chart at number four and was ranked seventy-one on the 2014 year-end Gaon Album Chart.

==== Tracklist ====
CD 1
No.	Title	Artist	Length
1.	"My Destiny"	Lyn	3:53
2.	"Like a Star" (별처럼)	K.Will	3:31
3.	"My Love from the Star" (별에서 온 그대; You Who Came from the Stars)	Younha	3:20
4.	"Goodbye" (안녕; Hello/Goodbye)	Hyolyn	3:40
5.	"I Love You"	JUST	4:01
6.	"Tears Fallin' Like Today" (오늘 같은 눈물이; Tears Like Today)	Huh Gak	3:53
7.	"Every Moment of You — Original" (너의 모든 순간)	Sung Si-kyung	4:05
8.	"If I" (너의 집 앞; In Front of Your House)	Kim Soo-hyun	3:43
9.	"Every Moment of You — Piano Ver."	Sung Si-kyung	4:02
Total length:			34:08

CD 2 is composed by Jeon Chang-yeop, Jin Myeongyong and Choe Changguk. (Note: Choe Changguk only contributed to the track no. 3, 9, 10 and 19.)

CD 2
No.	Title	Length
1.	"Man From Star (Opening Title)"	2:12
2.	"Back to the Present"	5:12
3.	"Cliff Tension"	4:41
4.	"Star Bach Comic"	1:39
5.	"Dark Fantasy"	3:14
6.	"Past Love"	3:12
7.	"Star Comic Pizzicato"	1:28
8.	"Dream Scenery I"	3:12
9.	"Dream Scenery II"	4:16
10.	"Mocha Comic Tension"	1:58
11.	"Tears in Minuet"	3:14
12.	"Missing You"	2:59
13.	"Beethoven Revolution"	4:01
14.	"Killing Tension I"	3:09
15.	"Killing Tension II"	1:44
16.	"Welcome to Earth"	3:35
17.	"Stars Comic Tension"	2:10
18.	"Waltz With Star"	2:08
19.	"Stars Love Mambo"	1:53
20.	"Space Love"	3:38
21.	"Run Away (Ending Title)"	2:26
Total length:		61:03

==== Chart performance ====
Weekly charts
Chart (2014)	Peak position
South Korean Albums (Gaon)	4

Year-end charts
Chart (2014)	Peak position
South Korean Albums (Gaon)	71

=== Singles ===
Singles included on the album were released from December 2013 to February 2014, and a special standalone single from the series, "Promise" (약속), sung by Kim Soo-hyun was released on March 13, 2014. Kim also contributed to the vocals of the soundtrack with "If I" (너의 집 앞; In Front of Your House); both of his covers were well-received by the audience. "Promise" reached the top of online music charts Soribada, Daum Music and Cyworld Music. All of the soundtrack's songs were popular across the Asia-Pacific region, including South Korea. Lyn's soundtrack single "My Destiny" peaked at number two on the Gaon Digital Chart and Billboard's K-pop Hot 100. She later received the Best Original Soundtrack award at the 16th Mnet Asian Music Awards for the song. Hyolyn's "Goodbye" topped the Billboard's K-pop Hot 100 chart for three consecutive weeks, making it the longest-running number one of January and February 2014.

==== Chart performance ====
List of singles, showing year release, selected chart positions, sales figures, and notes
Title	Year	Peak chart positions		Sales (Note: Korean sales are paid digital downloads weekly, monthly and annually provided by the Gaon Music Chart.)	Notes
Title	Year	KOR Gaon	KOR Hot	Sales	Notes
"My Destiny" (Lyn)	2013	2	2	KOR: 1,074,581 (Note: Sales figure as of December 2014.)	Part 1
"Like a Star" (K.Will)	2014	5	1	KOR: 723,530	Part 2
"My Love from the Star" (Younha)	2014	15	9	KOR: 389,907 (Note: Sales figure for "My Love from the Star" and "I Love You" as of March 8, 2014, and February 22, 2014, respectively.)	Part 3
"Goodbye" (Hyolyn)	2014	1	1	KOR: 1,161,073	Part 4
"I Love You" (JUST)	2014	29	7	KOR: 166,329	Part 5
"Tears Fallin' Like Today" (Huh Gak)	2014	2	2	KOR: 745,484	Part 6
"Every Moment of You" (Sung Si-kyung)	2014	2	2	KOR: 1,260,644	Part 7
"If I" (Kim Soo-hyun)	2014	4	4	KOR: 379,336 (Note: Sales figure as of March 2014.)	Part 8
"Promise" (Kim Soo-hyun)	2014	16	13	KOR: 125,051	Special

== Broadcast and viewership ==
My Love from the Star was originally broadcast on Seoul Broadcasting System (SBS) on Wednesdays and Thursdays at 10:00 pm Korea Standard Time (KST); it was the most-watched television program of its time slot from December 18, 2013. Episode 14, which was supposed to air on January 30, 2014, was delayed and Secretly, Greatly starring Kim Soo-hyun was broadcast instead. A 70-minute special episode titled My Love from the Star: the Beginning was aired on February 7, 2014, at 11:20 pm KST; it recapped episodes 1 to 15, focusing on the love story of Do Min-joon and Cheon Song-yi. The program was aired 30 minutes ahead of its original time on February 12 due to coverage of the 2014 Winter Olympics but it still ranked as the most-watched program.

Although My Love from the Star was originally planned as a twenty-episode series, the production company decided to make an extra episode due to demand from viewers. The 21-episode run finished its first run on February 27, 2014, with its highest nationwide rating of 28.1 percent, according to Nielsen Korea. A minute-long epilogue of the drama that shows happily newlywed couple Cheon Song-yi and Do Min-joon in a house with a garden was released on March 4.

Viewership ratings per episode of My Love from the Star in South Korea
Ep.	Original broadcast date	Average audience share			
Ep.	Original broadcast date	Nielsen Korea		TNmS (Note: Total National Multimedia Statistics (TNmS) is one of two audience-rating companies in Korea along with the Nielsen Korea.)	
Ep.	Original broadcast date	Nationwide	Seoul	Nationwide	Seoul
1	December 18, 2013	15.6%	17.0%	15.5%	19.1%
2	December 19, 2013	18.3%	20.5%	15.9%	18.5%
3	December 25, 2013	19.4%	21.0%	17.2%	20.4%
4	December 26, 2013	20.1%	22.1%	18.4%	20.8%
5	January 1, 2014	22.3%	25.3%	21.0%	24.8%
6	January 2, 2014	24.6%	27.8%	22.8%	28.2%
7	January 8, 2014	24.1%	26.6%	22.1%	27.0%
8	January 9, 2014	24.4%	27.4%	22.9%	29.1%
9	January 15, 2014	23.1%	25.4%	21.8%	26.2%
10	January 16, 2014	24.4%	27.1%	22.7%	28.3%
11	January 22, 2014	24.5%	26.8%	23.3%	28.1%
12	January 23, 2014	26.4%	28.2%	24.6%	29.0%
13	January 29, 2014	24.8%	26.1%	24.3%	27.5%
14	February 5, 2014	25.7%	27.8%	25.1%	30.7%
15	February 6, 2014	25.9%	27.7%	24.5%	28.7%
16	February 12, 2014	25.7%	28.1%	23.3%	28.0%
17	February 13, 2014	27.0%	29.5%	25.6%	29.8%
18	February 19, 2014	27.4%	29.9%	25.9%	30.8%
19	February 20, 2014	26.7%	29.1%	26.0%	29.9%
20	February 26, 2014	26.0%	28.0%	24.5%	29.3%
21	February 27, 2014	28.1%	29.6%	28.1%	33.2%
Average		24.0%	26.2%	22.6%	27.0%
Special	February 7, 2014	10.0%	11.5%	8.2%	9.4%
In the table above, the blue numbers represent the lowest ratings and the red numbers represent the highest ratings.

=== International broadcast ===
The show was premiered outside South Korea, during its official run on SBS, through online video platforms LeTV and iQIYI. It was one of the most-viewed streaming shows on iQIYI, where it was streamed more than 14.5 billion times from December 2013 to February 2014. Later, it was exported to nearly twenty countries. In the Philippines, it topped viewership ratings when it aired on GMA Network from April 21 to June 30, 2014, dubbed in Filipino. In China, My Love from the Star was aired with a different ending because of the government's censorship of materials that depict aliens and supernatural beings. Its broadcast on the Chinese television channel Anhui was concluded with the entire story being a fictional tale that Do Min-joon writes for Cheon Song-yi. The broadcasting rights has also been acquired by over-the-top content platforms like Viu, Viki and Netflix, where it is available with multi-language subtitles.

== Reception ==
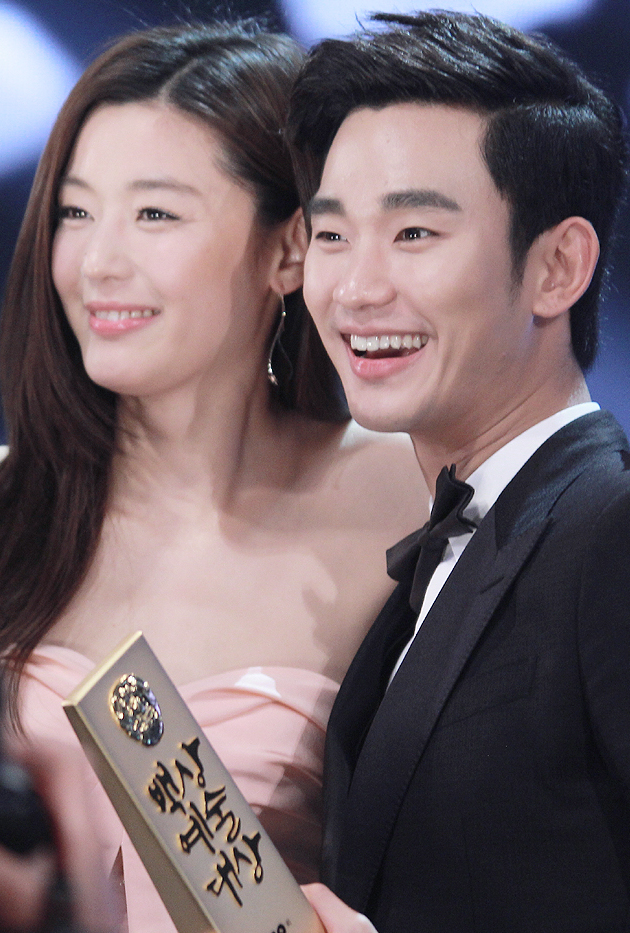
Jun Ji-hyun and Kim Soo-hyun photographed at the 50th Baeksang Arts Awards

My Love from the Star led to the resurgence of Korean wave (or "Hallyu") throughout Asia with reigniting it in China, and an increase in interest in the United States and North Korea. It was placed first as "Korea's most favorite program" in a poll conducted by Gallup Korea in February 2014, with 11.5 percent of the votes, replacing MBC's Infinite Challenge, which had held that position for the previous eleven months. Additionally, it was named the "most popular television program" of 2014 by CJ E&M and research firm AGB Nielsen Media Research.

=== Critical response ===
My Love from the Star largely received positive reviews from critics and viewers. In an op-ed piece published by the China Daily, writer Xiao Lixin attributed the program's success to "great innovations in South Korean TV productions in terms of themes and narrative patterns." He praised the plot as "logical and fast-paced", and interspersed with "whimsy and romantic punch lines", and write "high-speed photography and computer-generated effects" help "create a lifelike visual impact". Film and drama critic Greg Wheeler described it as "a silly, funny and surprisingly poignant drama, one that strips away the humour to lean in hard on the melodrama at just the right times. While the show is an outright romance first and foremost, it does have some great drama throughout too."

Lee Sang-hyun of Yonhap News Agency said the "power of the drama is also in the charm of the ... leading actors" and that "[i]t would have been difficult to gain convincing power for such an unrealistic setting and storytelling without Kim Soo-hyun's unique thick voice and stable acting ability". He also said Jun Ji-hyun's "acting tone" synchronised well with story development and that "[w]hen the comic melody with Do Min-joon reinforced, she showed a lovely appearance, and when a crisis came in the relationship, she stably conveyed sad emotions". Philippines Cosmopolitan's Hanna Tamondong called the series as "iconic" and said that it will "send you dancing and laughing and crying because of Do Min-joon and Cheon Song-yi". Park Si-soo writing for The Korea Times said that "Shin Sung-rok was a scene stealer" and "his villain role gave the drama a new dimension".

A year-end poll that Gallup conducted in South Korea named Kim Soo-hyun the "most memorable actor" of 2014, while Jun Ji-hyun was listed in third position.

=== Cultural impact ===
My Love from the Star became a cultural phenomenon in South Korea and China. The series started a craze for chimaek; Korean fried chicken (chicken) and maekju, a popular Korean snack of chicken and beer, which is the female protagonist's favourite snack. Despite declining chicken consumption in China due to fear of H7N9 bird flu, fried chicken restaurants in cities saw an increase in orders after the show was broadcast there. Korean instant noodle maker Nongshim said sales in January and February 2014―when the drama aired―rose to a record high in its more-than-15-year history of business in China, which was attributed to a scene in which the lead couple enjoyed a bowl of noodles on a trip.

The series influenced Korean fashion; clothes, accessories and make-up products worn by Jun Ji-hyun saw an "unprecedented" surge in orders. The children's novel The Miraculous Journey of Edward Tulane by Kate DiCamillo, from which the male protagonist repeatedly quotes throughout the series, went to the top of the bestseller lists in major Korean bookshops. A luggage manufacturing company also saw increased sales in China after Kim Soo-hyun carried one of its backpacks. The drama also drew the international community to the Korean language; "씨" (ssi), (Note: The word "ssi" is added after the name of a person, which is considered a polite way to refer to a person in South Korea.) which Jun Ji-hyun adds after male protagonist's name, became the most-discussed word. Although the series was sold to China for US$40,000 per episode, its increased popularity led to a sharp rise in the price for the Chinese distribution rights of future Korean dramas.

My Love from the Star attracted international tourism to South Korea and its filming locations became major attractions. Songdo rocky mountain in Incheon, where Do Min-joon rescues Cheon Song-yi from a near-death experience, was developed into a tourist attraction by Incheon Development and Tourism Corporation. Among the filming locations were Dongdaemun Design Plaza & Park (DDP) and Boutique Monaco; newly built luxury buildings. The Korea Tourism Organization held a 3D exhibit at the DDP Art Hall that featured one of the show's house sets with display rooms titled "Start," "Fate," "Shaking" and "Longing" in line with the plot, from June 10, to August 15, 2014. At the exhibition, Do Min-joon's knit and Cheon Song-yi's handbag were sold in an auction for US$2,346; the proceeds were donated to a local charity. Other locations that attracted tourists include Incheon National University—one of the major shooting locations— and the French-themed village Petite France in Gapyeong, Gyeonggi, where Do Min-joon and Cheon Song-yi share a kiss.

In March 2014, The Washington Post reported My Love from the Star's popularity had led to it being discussed at China's National People's Congress, particularly in a committee of the political advisory body Chinese People's Political Consultative Conference (CPPCC), where it reportedly topped the agenda among delegates from the culture and entertainment industry.

=== Awards and nominations ===
My Love from the Star's cast and crew won numerous awards, both in South Korea and internationally. The series won the Best Drama Award at the 7th Korea Drama Awards, the Top Excellence Korean Drama Award at the 9th Seoul International Drama Awards, Magnolia Award for Best Foreign Television Series at the 20th Shanghai Television Festival, and the Best Foreign Drama Award at the 8th International Drama Festival in Tokyo. It was nominated at the 50th Baeksang Arts Awards in nine television categories including Best Drama, Best Director and Best Screenplay. Jun Ji-hyun won the Grand Prize – Television and Kim Soo-hyun won the Most Popular Actor – Television at the ceremony. Jun also won the Grand Prize at the 22nd SBS Drama Awards while Kim Soo-hyun earned the notch at the 7th Korea Drama Awards. Kim Soo-hyun also won the Best Actor in Asia Award at the 8th International Drama Festival in Tokyo.

== Adaptations ==
=== China ===
Due to its popularity in mainland China, Chinese production company Meng Jiang Wei re-edited the series into a two-hour, feature-length film that was released in theatres in August 2014.

=== North America ===
In September 2014, it was announced an American remake was under development at American Broadcasting Company; it was to be written by Elizabeth Craft and Sarah Fain, and produced by HB Entertainment and EnterMedia Contents in association with Sony Pictures Television. However, for unknown reasons, the remake was shelved.

=== Philippines ===
In 2017, a Philippine remake of the same title, which was directed by Joyce Bernal, was broadcast on GMA Network. The rights for the production were acquired by GMA-7 in 2016. Jennylyn Mercado was cast as Cheon Song-yi, who was renamed Steffi Cheon; and Filipino-Spanish model and first-time actor Gil Cuerva was cast for the role of Do Min-joon, who was renamed Matteo Do. After the premiere of its first episode on May 29, 2017, the hashtag "#MyLoveFromTheStarPH" was the most-popular Twitter hashtag in the Philippines and at number two worldwide.

=== Thailand ===
A Thai remake, titled My Love from Another Star (Note: Thai: ลิขิตรักข้ามดวงดาว; lit. Destiny of Love Across the Stars) was broadcast in Thailand in the second half of 2019 by Channel 3; it stars Nadech Kugimiya and Peranee Kongthai, and achieved low ratings.

=== Japan ===
A Japanese remake was released on Amazon Prime on February 23, 2022, starring Mizuki Yamamoto and Sota Fukushi.

== Plagiarism suit ==
In a statement posted on her blog on December 20, 2013, author Kang Kyung-ok alleged the concept of My Love from the Star was plagiarized from her 2008 comic book Seol-hee, claiming the background, setup, jobs and relationships between characters were similar. The production company HB Entertainment denied plagiarism in an official statement, calling the claim "completely baseless". The company said; "the two works may look similar as they both take a motif from the Gwanghae Journal in the Veritable Records of the Joseon Dynasty". The show's screenwriter Park Ji-eun said she "had never read or heard of" Seol-hee.

On May 20, 2014, Kang filed her lawsuit against Park Ji-eun and HB Entertainment in court, asking for ₩600 million in damages. HB Entertainment said it was prepared to "strongly confront" the lawsuit with its own evidence and witnesses, calling the charges of plagiarism "synonymous to a death sentence" for creators that must be "eradicated". Kang dropped her lawsuit on July 3, 2014, after an out-of-court settlement.

In April 2014, Indonesian television network RCTI aired a series titled Kau Yang Berasal Dari Bintang, (Note: lit. You Are from a Star) which was first thought to be an authorised remake of My Love from the Star but was then found to have been plagiarized. The Indonesian series has exactly the same set up and storyline as the Korean drama. A representative of SBS Contents Hub stated: "The drama was created without the obtainment of legal publication rights. You could view it as plagiarism ... While we were in the process of discussing the sale of legal publication rights with another Indonesian enterprise, this drama came out. We are in the midst of finding what course of action to take." Broadcast of the series was discontinued but after an agreement between RCTI and SBS, it began airing again in June 2014.
