= MAMA Award for Best OST =

Annual Korean television series award

- Awarded for: Top soundtrack for a television series
- Country: South Korea
- Presented by: CJ E&M Pictures (Mnet)
- First award: 2004
- Currently held by: Huntrix – "Golden" (2025)
- Website: Mnet Asian Music Awards

The MAMA Award for Best OST (Korean: 베스트 OST) is an award presented annually by CJ E&M Pictures (Mnet) at the MAMA Awards. It was first awarded at the 2004 Mnet KM Music Video Festival; Jo Sungmo won the award for his song "By Your Side" for the drama series Lovers in Paris, and is given in honor for the performers with the best soundtrack for a television series.

== Winners and nominees ==
Year^{[I]}	Recipient(s)	Soundtrack	Television series	Nominees (Television series in parentheses)
2004 (6th)	Jo Sung-mo	"By Your Side"	Lovers in Paris	Moon Geun-young – "I Don't Know About Love Yet" (My Little Bride); Lee Seung-chul – "Fate" (Phoenix); Cho Eun – "Can't It Be" (Something Happened in Bali); Han Ye-seul – "You Are Different" (Nonstop 4)
2005 (7th)	Clazziquai	"She Is"	My Lovely Sam Soon	—
2006 (8th)	SeeYa	"Crazy Love Song"	Invisible Man	—
2007 (9th)	No award given			
2008 (10th)	Kim Jong-wook & SG Wannabe	"Fate Reverse"	East of Eden	Taeyeon – "If" (Hong Gil-dong); Yoo Seung-chan – "I Love You" (Mom's Dead Upset); Tei – "Time Of Dreams" (Gourmet); F.T. Island – "One Word" (On Air)
2009 (11th)	SS501	"Because I'm Stupid"	Boys Over Flowers	Baek Ji-young – "Don't Forget" (Iris); Lee Seung-chul – "No More Love Like This" (Blue Love Story); T-max – "Paradise" (Boys Over Flowers); Tiffany – "I'm Alone" (Ja Myung Go)
2010 (12th)	No award given			
2011 (13th)	Baek Ji-young	"That Woman"	Secret Garden	Huh Gak – Please Don't Forget Me" (The Greatest Love); IU – "Someday" (Dream High); Yim Jae-bum – "Love" (City Hunter); Taeyeon – "I Love You" (Athena: Goddess of War)
2012 (14th)	Seo In-guk & Jung Eun-ji	"All For You"	Reply 1997	Huh Gak – "One Person" (Big); Lee Jong-hyun – "My Love" (A Gentleman's Dignity); Lyn – "Back In Time" (Moon Embracing the Sun); Taeyeon – "Missing You Like Crazy" (The King 2 Hearts)
2013 (15th)	Yoon Mi-rae	"Touch Love"	Master's Sun	Davichi – "Don't You Know" (IRIS 2); Jungyup – "Why Did You Come Now?" (I Can Hear Your Voice); Suzy – "Don't Forget Me" (Gu Family Book); The One – "Winter Love" (That Winter, the Wind Blows)
2014 (16th)	Lyn	"My Destiny"	My Love from the Star	Davichi – "It's Okay, That's Love" (It's Okay, That's Love); Lim Kim – "Happy Me" (Reply 1994); Sung Si-kyung – "Every Moment of You" (My Love from the Star); Yoon Mi-rae – "I Love You" (It's Okay, That's Love)
2015 (17th)	No award given			
2016 (18th)	Lee Juck	"Don't Worry"	Reply 1988	Gummy – "Moonlight Drawn by Clouds" (Love in the Moonlight); Davichi – "This Love" (Descendants of the Sun); Ben – "Like a Dream" (Another Miss Oh); Jang Beom-june – "Reminiscence" (Signal)
2017 (19th)	Ailee	"I Will Go to You Like the First Snow"	Guardian: The Lonely and Great God	Bolbbalgan4 – “You and Me from the Start” (The Emperor: Owner of the Mask); Suzy – "I Love You Boy" (While You Were Sleeping); Crush – "Beautiful" (Guardian: The Lonely and Great God); Chanyeol, Punch – "Stay With Me" (Guardian: The Lonely and Great God)
2018 (20th)	Seventeen	"A-Teen"	A-Teen	NU'EST W – "And I" (Mr. Sunshine); Roy Kim – "No Longer Mine" (Familiar Wife); Park Hyo Shin – "The Day" (Mr. Sunshine); Paul Kim – "Every Day, Every Moment" (Should We Kiss First?)
2019 (21st)	Gummy	"Remember Me"	Hotel del Luna	Jannabi – "Take My Hand" (Romance Is a Bonus Book); Jang Beom-june – "Your Shampoo Scent In The Flowers" (Be Melodramatic); Paul Kim – "So Long" (Hotel del Luna); Ha Jin – "We All Lie" (Sky Castle)
2020 (22nd)	Gaho	"Start Over"	Itaewon Class	Baek Ye-rin – "Here I Am Again" (Crash Landing on You); Sandeul – "Slightly Tipsy" (She Is My Type); Joy – "Introduce Me A Good Person" (Hospital Playlist); Jo Jung-suk – "Aloha" (Hospital Playlist)
2021 (23rd)	Jo Jung-suk	"I Like You"	Hospital Playlist Season 2	10cm – "Borrow Your Night" (Romance 101); Choi Yu-ree – "Wish" (Hometown Cha Cha); Lee Mu-jin – "Rain and You" (Hospital Playlist Season 2); Yang Yo-seob & Jung Eun-ji – "Love Day" (2021) (Romance 101)
2022 (24th)	MeloMance	"Love, Maybe"	Business Proposal	10cm – "Drawer" (Our Beloved Summer); Jimin and Ha Sung-woon – "With You" (Our Blues); V – "Christmas Tree" (Our Beloved Summer); Wonstein – "Your Existence" (Twenty-Five Twenty-One)
2023 (25th)	BTS	"The Planet"	Bastions	Big Naughty – "With Me" (The Interest of Love); Lim Jae-hyun – "Heaven (2023)" (It Was Spring); Paul Kim – "You Remember" (The Glory); Tomorrow X Together – "Goodbye Now" (Love Revolution)
2024 (26th)	Crush	"Love You With All My Heart"	Queen of Tears	Eclipse – "Sudden Shower" (from Lovely Runner); Lee Chang-sub – "Heavenly Fate" (from A Not So Fairytale); Roy Kim – "Whenever, Wherever" (from My Demon); Taeyeon – "Dream" (from Welcome to Samdal-ri)
2025 (27th)	Huntrix	"Golden"	KPop Demon Hunters	BoyNextDoor – "Never Loved this Way Before" (Odd Girl Out); Park Hyo-shin – "Hero" (The Firefighters); Saja Boys – "Soda Pop" (KPop Demon Hunters); Tomorrow X Together – "When the Day Comes" (Resident Playbook)

^{^[I]} Each year is linked to the article about the Mnet Asian Music Awards held that year.

== Gallery of winners ==
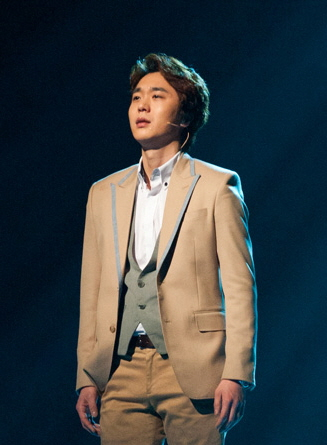
Jo Sungmo, (2004)

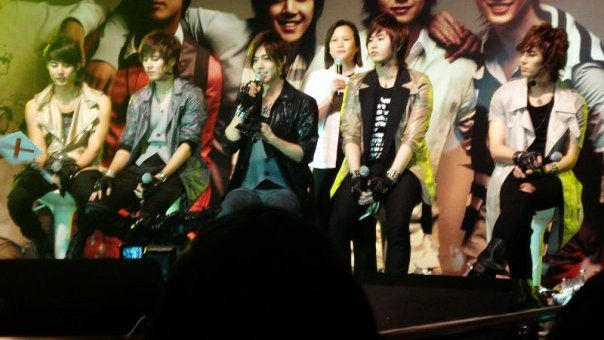
SS501, (2009)

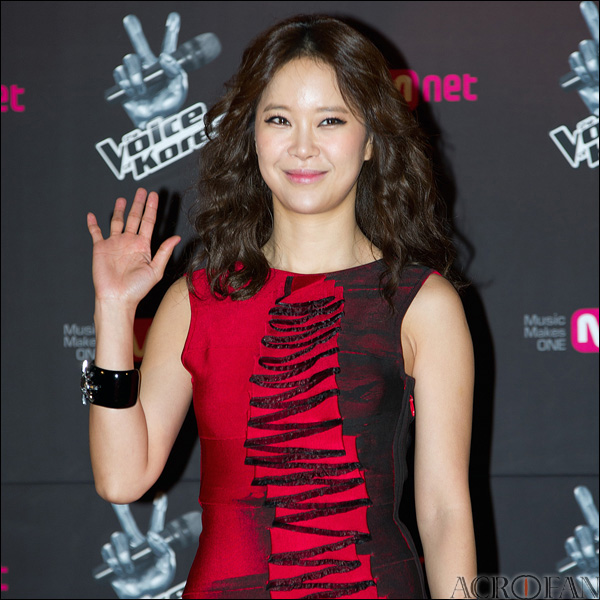
Baek Ji-young, (2011)

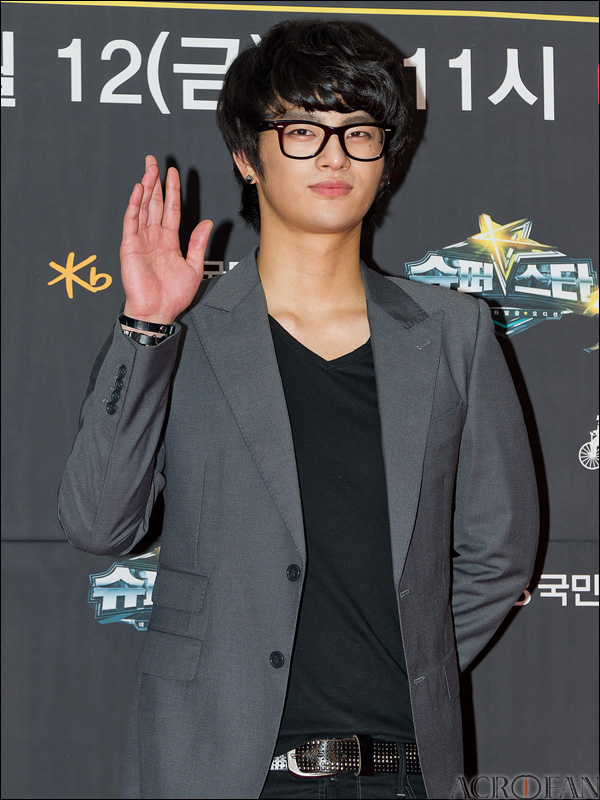
Seo In-guk, (2012)

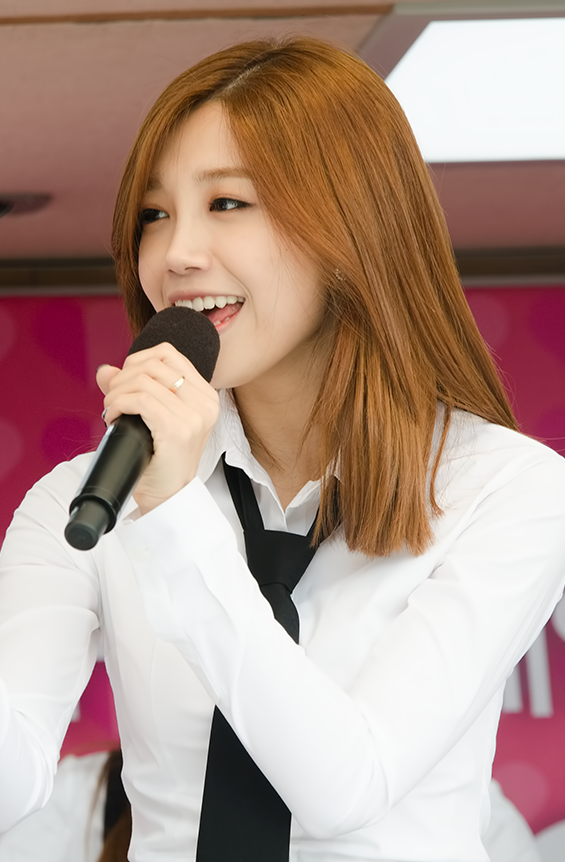
Jung Eun-ji, (2012)

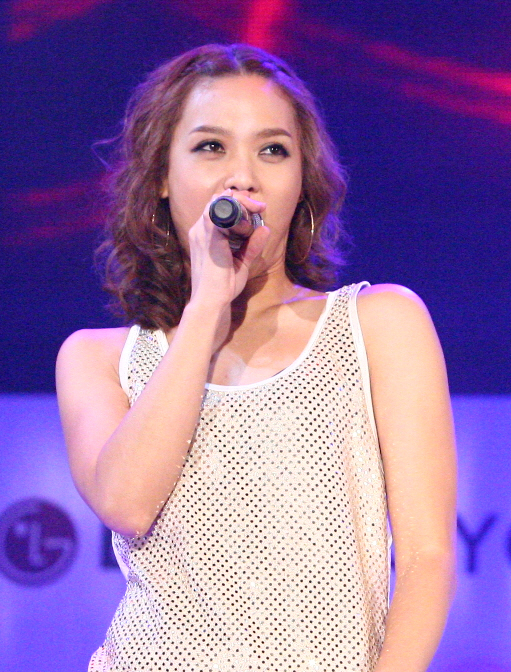
Yoon Mi-rae, (2013)

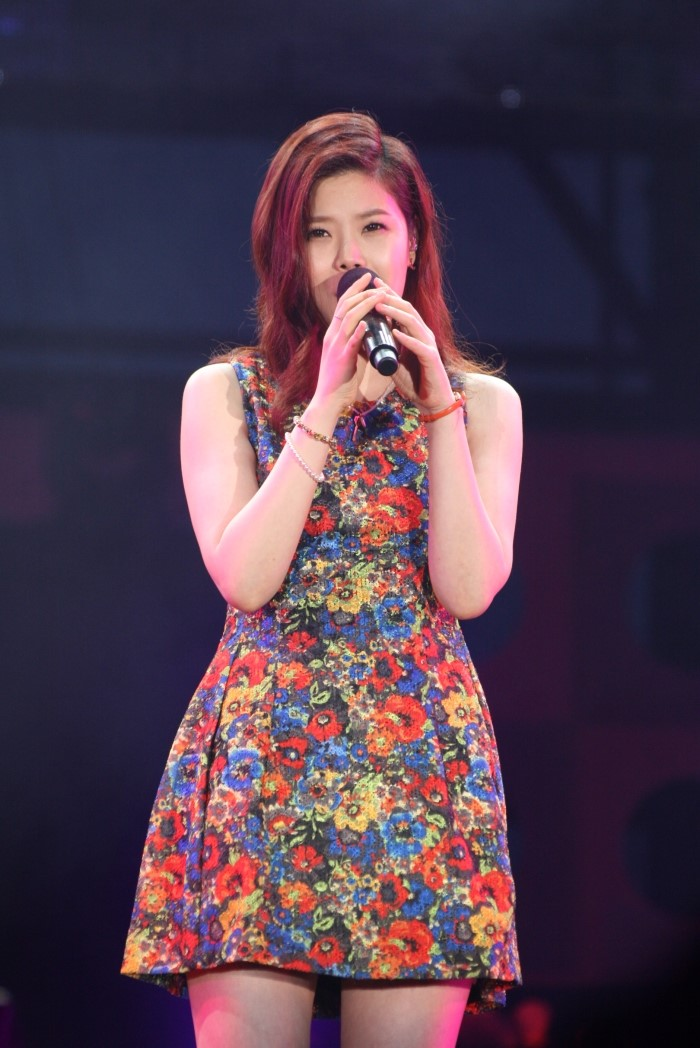
Lyn, (2014)

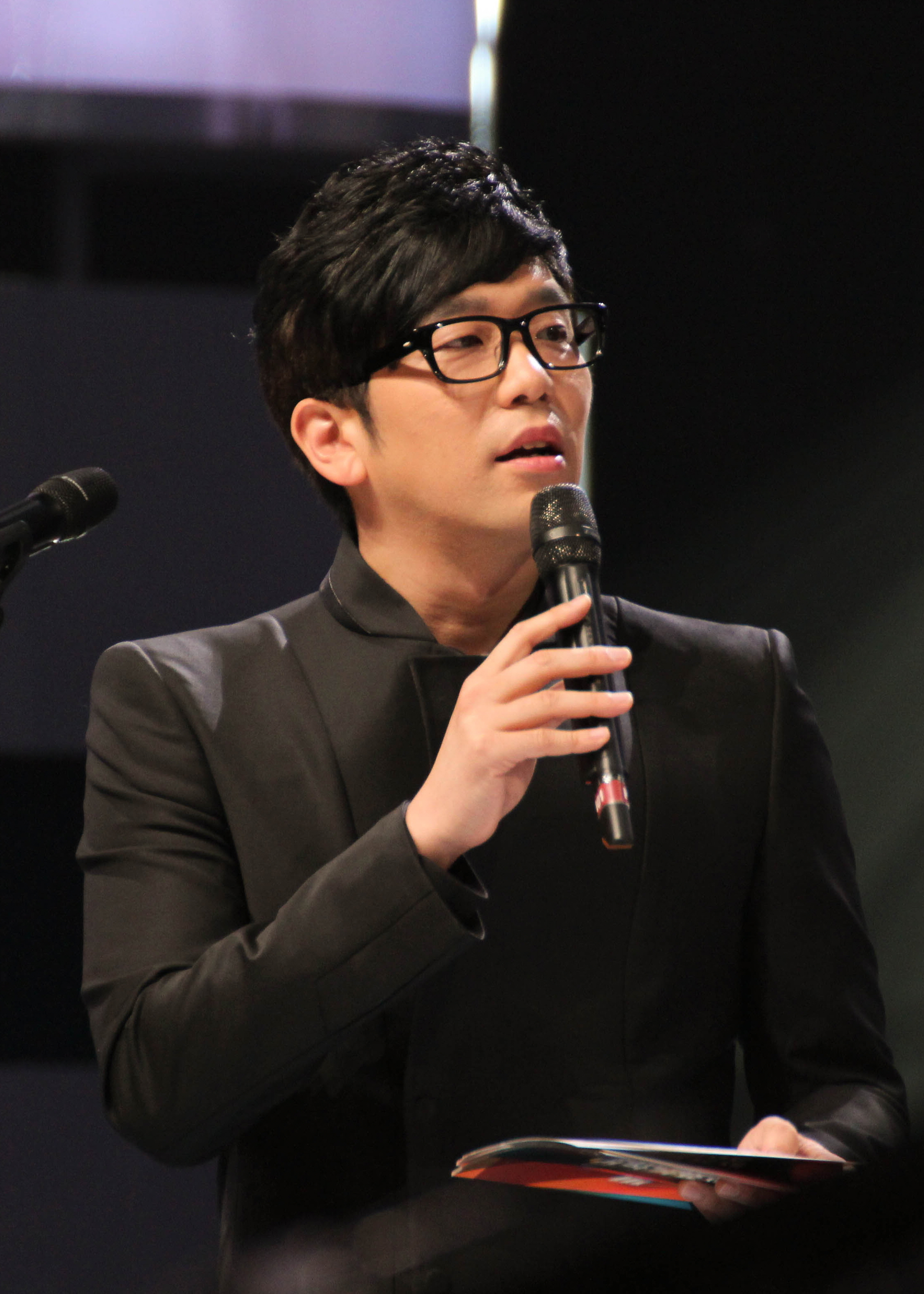
Lee Juck, (2016)

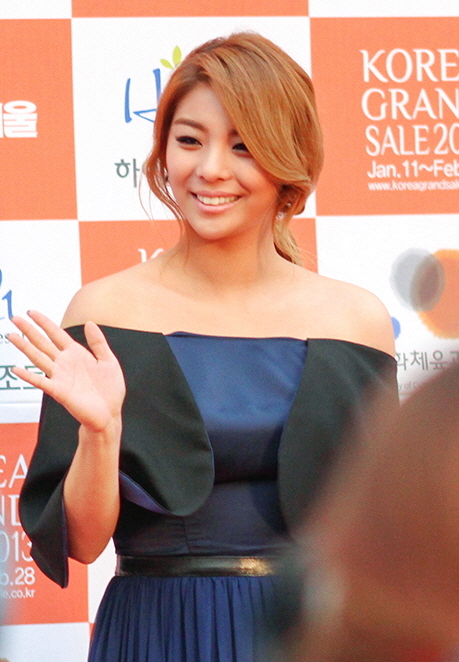
Ailee, (2017)

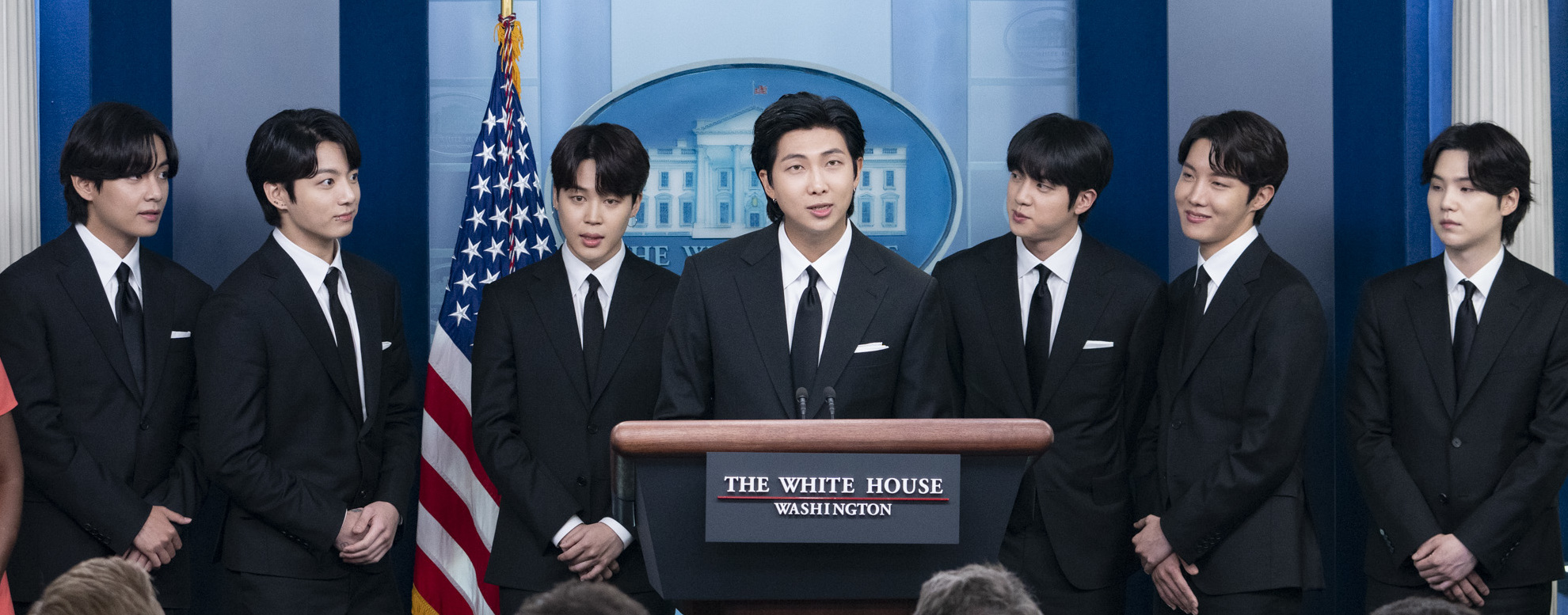
BTS, (2023)

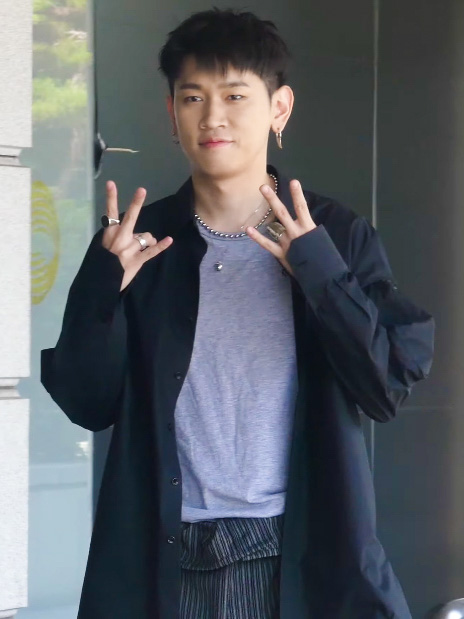
Crush, (2024)
