= 7th Korea Drama Awards =

2014 edition of award ceremony

- Date: October 1, 2014
- Site: Gyeongnam Culture and Art Center, Jinju, South Gyeongsang Province

The 7th Korea Drama Awards is an awards ceremony for excellence in television in South Korea. It was held at the Gyeongnam Culture and Art Center in Jinju, South Gyeongsang Province on October 1, 2014. The nominees were chosen from Korean dramas that aired from October 2013 to September 2014.

== Nominations and winners ==
(Winners denoted in bold)

Grand Prize (Daesang)	Best Drama
**Kim Soo-hyun** - **My Love from the Star**; Cho Jae-hyun - Jeong Do-jeon; Ha Ji-won - Empress Ki; Jun Ji-hyun - My Love from the Star; Lee Min-ho - The Heirs	**My Love from the Star (SBS)**; Empress Ki (MBC); Jeong Do-jeon (KBS1); Wang's Family (KBS2); Secret Love Affair (jTBC)
Best Production Director	Best Screenplay
**Shin Won-ho** - **Reply 1994**; Ahn Pan-seok - Secret Love Affair; Han Hee, Lee Sung-joon - Empress Ki; Jang Tae-yoo - My Love from the Star; Kang Shin-hyo, Boo Sung-chul - The Heirs	**Jung Hyun-min** - **Jeong Do-jeon**; Jung Sung-joo - Secret Love Affair; Kim Soon-ok - Jang Bo-ri is Here!; Lee Woo-jung - Reply 1994; Park Ji-eun - My Love from the Star
Top Excellence Award, Actor	Top Excellence Award, Actress
**Kim Jae-joong** - **Triangle**; Ji Chang-wook - Empress Ki; Lee Jong-suk - Doctor Stranger; Lee Seung-gi - You're All Surrounded; Yoo Ah-in - Secret Love Affair	**Oh Yeon-seo** - **Jang Bo-ri is Here!**; Choi Ji-woo - The Suspicious Housekeeper; Hwang Jung-eum - Endless Love, Secret Love; Kim Hee-ae - Secret Love Affair; Lee Ji-ah - Thrice Married Woman
Excellence Award, Actor	Excellence Award, Actress
**Lee Kwang-soo** - **It's Okay, That's Love**; Choi Jin-hyuk - You Are My Destiny, The Heirs; Kim Woo-bin - The Heirs; Park Hae-jin - My Love from the Star; Seo In-guk - High School King of Savvy	**Kang So-ra** - **Doctor Stranger**; Baek Jin-hee - Empress Ki; Jeon So-min - Princess Aurora; Lee Jin - Shining Romance; Park Han-byul - One Well-Raised Daughter
Best New Actor	Best New Actress
**Ahn Jae-hyun** - **My Love from the Star**; **Seo Kang-joon** - **Cunning Single Lady**; Lee Joon - Gap-dong; Lee Yi-kyung - My Love from the Star; Son Ho-jun - Reply 1994	**Min Do-hee** - **Reply 1994**; Jun Hyoseong - My Dear Cat; Kim Dasom - Melody of Love; Kim Ga-eun - I Can Hear Your Voice; Ko Sung-hee - Miss Korea
Best Young Actor/Actress	Best Couple Award
**Kim Ji-young** - **Jang Bo-ri is Here!**; Hong Hwa-ri - Wonderful Days; Kim Yoo-bin - God's Gift: 14 Days	**Kim Sung-kyun** and **Min Do-hee** - **Reply 1994**
Best Original Soundtrack	Hallyu Hot Star Award
**"Goodbye My Love" (Ailee)** - **You Are My Destiny**; "Hello / Goodbye" (Hyolyn) - My Love from the Star; "My Destiny" (Lyn) - My Love from the Star; "Touch Love" (Yoon Mi-rae) - Master's Sun	**Kim Soo-hyun** - **My Love from the Star**
Hot Star Award	Global Star Award
**Shin Sung-rok** - **My Love from the Star**	**Ryohei Otani** - **Gunman in Joseon**
