= Jang Tae-yoo =

South Korean television director (born 1972)

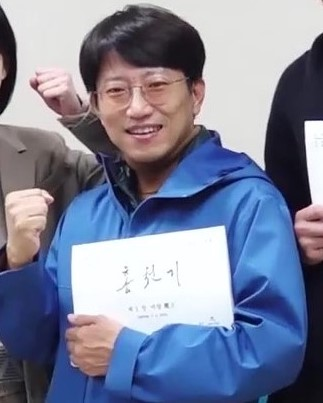
- Jang in 2020
- Born: 1972 (age 53–54); Seoul, South Korea
- Other name: David Chang
- Occupation: Television director
- Years active: 1999-present
- Agents: SBS Studio TaeYou; Yuehua Entertainment

Korean name
- Hangul: 장태유
- Hanja: 張太侑
- RR: Jang Taeyu
- MR: Chang T'aeyu
- Website: Studio TaeYou

Jang Tae-yoo (born 1972) is a South Korean television director. He directed the Korean dramas War of Money (2007), Painter of the Wind (2008), Deep Rooted Tree (2011), My Love from the Star (2013-2014), Hyena (2020), Lovers of the Red Sky (2021), and Bon Appétit, Your Majesty (2025).

== Career ==
Jang Tae-yoo entered Seoul National University in 1998 majoring in Industrial Design, but eventually dropped out. He originally wanted to direct commercials, but during the IMF crisis, there were no new hires at advertising agencies. So his older brother Jang Hyuk-jae, then a television director at SBS, encouraged him to join the network.

Jang began working as an assistant director on the television drama Tomato in 1999, which he later described as more difficult than mandatory military service. This was followed by Woman on Top (also in 1999; though he was replaced after three months), Ladies in the Palace (2001-2002), Sunrise House (2002), and Punch (2003). He was also the second unit director on Choice (2004-2005) and Bad Housewife (2005).

Jang's first drama as the lead director was The 101st Proposal (2006) starring Lee Moon-sik and Park Sun-young, a remake of the same-titled 1991 Japanese drama about an unattractive but kind-hearted aging bachelor who meets the girl of his dreams, a TV announcer still mourning her dead boyfriend. Then in 2007, Jang directed War of Money, which explored loan shark culture and drew high ratings as well as praise for its cast led by Park Shin-yang (Park later won the highest honor, called the "Daesang" or Grand Prize, at the 2007 SBS Drama Awards). Jang reunited with Park in the period drama Painter of the Wind (2008), adapted from Lee Jung-myung's historical fiction novel that depicted the relationship between two Joseon era artists, Kim Hong-do and Shin Yun-bok (the latter is a woman disguised as a man, portrayed by Moon Geun-young). Though Jang said he found it "challenging to make art interesting," the drama drew critical acclaim, particularly for Moon, who became the youngest ever Daesang winner at the 2008 SBS Drama Awards. War of Money and Painter of the Wind established Jang as one of the top production-directors (or "PD") in Korean television.

For his next drama, Jang chose another Lee Jung-myung adaptation Deep Rooted Tree (2011), about a murder mystery surrounding King Sejong's invention of the Hangul system. It starred Han Suk-kyu and Jang Hyuk, and was notable for Han's return to television after appearing mostly in films (Han won the Daesang at the 2011 SBS Drama Awards). Jang's track record continued to attract movie stars to the small screen, followed by Jun Ji-hyun in My Love from the Star (2013-2014). Written by Park Ji-eun (herself a hitmaker), the romantic-sci-fi dramedy about an alien who falls for a famous actress (played by Kim Soo-hyun and Jun) was popular domestically and overseas. The drama's massive success in the Chinese market led to more opportunities for Jang, so he took a leave of absence from SBS, and signed an exclusive five-year contract with Yuehua Entertainment. His next project will be a Chinese 3D romantic comedy film.

Jang is also an adjunct professor of Performing Arts at the Seoul Arts College since the first semester of 2012.

== Filmography ==
=== Film ===
Year	Title		Credited as			Ref.
Year	English	Original	Assistant Director	Second unit director	Director	Ref.
2016	MBA Partners	夢想合夥人	No	Yes	No	

=== Television series ===
Year	Title		Network	Credited as			Ref.
Year	English	Korean	Network	Assistant Director	Second unit director	Director	Ref.
1999	Tomato	토마토	SBS	Yes	No	No	
1999	Woman on Top	맛을 보여드립니다	SBS	Yes	No	No	
2001-2002	Ladies in the Palace	여인천하	SBS	Yes	No	No	
2002	Sunrise House	해뜨는 집	SBS	Yes	No	No	
2003	Punch	때려	SBS	Yes	No	No	
2004-2005	Choice		SBS	No	Yes	No	
2005	Bad Housewife	불량 주부	SBS	No	Yes	No	
2006	The 101st Proposal	101번째 프러포즈	SBS	No	No	Yes	
2007	War of Money	쩐의 전쟁	SBS	No	No	Yes	
2008	Painter of the Wind	바람의 화원	SBS	No	No	Yes	
2011	Deep Rooted Tree	뿌리깊은 나무	SBS	No	No	Yes	
2013-2014	My Love from the Star	별에서 온 그대	SBS	No	No	Yes	
2020	Hyena	하이에나	SBS	No	No	Yes	
2021	Lovers of the Red Sky	홍천기	SBS	No	No	Yes	
2024	Knight Flower	밤에 피는 꽃	MBC	No	No	Yes	
2025	Bon Appétit, Your Majesty	폭군의 셰프	tvN	No	No	Yes	

== Awards and nominations ==
Year	Award	Category	Nominated work	Result	Ref.
2008	35th Korea Broadcasting Awards	Best Director (TV)	War of Money	Won	
2008	44th Baeksang Arts Awards	Best Director (TV)	War of Money	Nominated	
2012	48th Baeksang Arts Awards	Best Director (TV)	Deep Rooted Tree	Nominated	
2012	5th Korea Drama Awards	Best Production Director	Deep Rooted Tree	Won	
2014	50th Baeksang Arts Awards	Best Director–Television (Note: Co-directing with Oh Chung-hwan)	My Love from the Star	Nominated	
2014	7th Korea Drama Awards	Best Production Director	My Love from the Star	Nominated	
2014	3rd APAN Star Awards	Best Production Director	My Love from the Star	Won	
2014	27th Grimae Awards	Best Production Director	My Love from the Star	Won	
