= 2014 Mnet Asian Music Awards =

K-pop music award ceremony in Hong Kong

- Date: December 3, 2014
- Location: AsiaWorld–Arena, Hong Kong
- Hosted by: Song Seung-heon
- Most awards: Exo (4)
- Most nominations: Exo (5)
- Website: Mnet Asian Music Awards

Television/radio coverage
- Network: South Korea: Mnet; Japan: Mnet Japan; Southeast Asia: Channel M Thailand: GMM 25; Cambodia: MyTV
- Runtime: Approximately 430 minutes

The 2014 Mnet Asian Music Awards (MAMA) was held on December 3, 2014, at the AsiaWorld–Arena, Hong Kong. It marked its sixteenth edition acknowledging the past year's K-pop releases. Nominees were announced on October 27, 2014. Leading the nominees was Exo with five. By the end of the ceremony, Exo received four awards, the most received awards of the night.

== Background ==
This event marked the sixteenth Mnet Asian Music Awards. It was broadcast live in China, Japan, Hong Kong and Southeast Asia through various channels, as well as around the world. The event took place in the same country and the same venue for the second consecutive time. This also marked the first time that the event organized a campaign called Girls' Education Campaign with CJ and UNESCO. It was also the first time that UnionPay sponsored the event exclusively.

== Performers and presenters ==
The following individuals and groups, listed in order of appearance, presented awards or performed musical numbers.

=== Performers ===
Name(s)	Performed	Notes	Ref.
AOA	"Miniskirt", "Like a Cat"		
Fred Cheng	"Light My Fire"		
Block B	"Very Good", "Jackpot"		
Dancing 9	"Step by Step", "Get Up (I Feel Like Being a) Sex Machine", "Beat It"	"Beat Box" (Opening Act)	
Bobby ft. The Quiett and Dok2 and Masta Wu	"YGGR", "Come Here"	"Beat Box" (Opening Act)	
Girl's Day and Ailee	"Something", "Don't Touch Me", "Problem"	"Last Fantasy"	
Winner and Epik High ft. Yoo In-na, Mino, B.I & Bobby	"Empty", "Happen Ending", "Born Hater"	"Beyond the Screen"	
John Legend ft. Tiffany & Chen	"Green Light"	"The Legend Continues"	
John Legend	"All Of Me	"The Legend Continues"	
IU ft. Mino	"Friday", "Fly, Chick"	"Memories"	
Eason Chan	"Exaggerated"	"Rain"	
Sistar ft. Junggiggo, P.O, Nam JooHyuk, and Lee Jong-hyuk	"Some", "Touch My Body"	"Four Shades Of Love"	
Block B and BTS	Dance Battle, "Tough Cookie", "RM", "Danger", "H.E.R.", "Let's Get It Started"	"Fight Of The Century"	
Kwak Jin-eon ft. Kim Feel of Superstar K6	"Be Proud Of", "Don't Worry Dear"	"Miracles Never Stop"	
Infinite	"Last Romeo", "Back"	"Infinite Spectrum"	
Lee Seung-chul and Yoon Eun-hye with the Choir	"The Day"	"2014 MAMA x UNESCO's Music Makes One"	
Seo Taiji ft. IU, Zico and Vasco	"Sogyeokdong", "Christmalo.win", "Come Back Home"	"Media Wonderland"	
Exo	"Black Pearl", "Tell Me What Is Love", "Deep Breath", "Overdose"	"The New Age of EXO"	
G-Dragon and Taeyang	"Eyes, Nose, Lips", Rap Performance, "Good Boy", "Fantastic Baby"	"Colorize"	

=== Presenters ===
2014 Mnet Asian Music Awards host

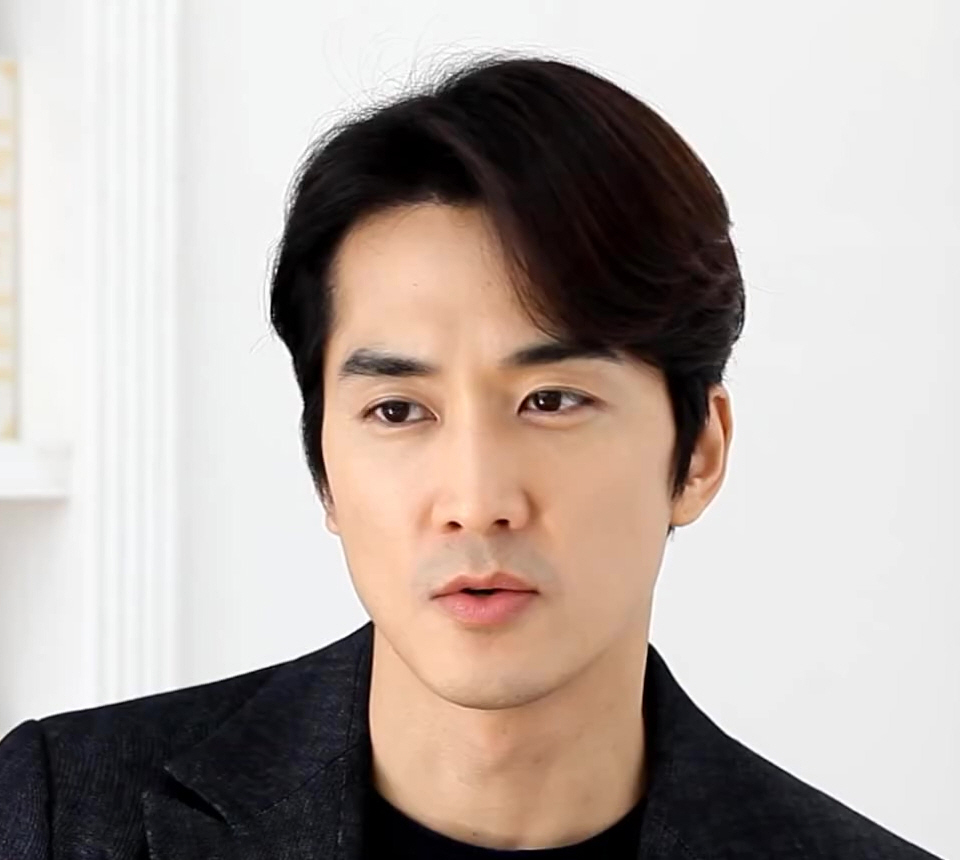
Song Seung-heon

- Moon Hee-joon, Choi Yeo-jin, and Yura – red carpet hosts, presented Best Asian Style
- Song Seung-heon – main host of ceremony
- Ahn Jae-hyun and Park Min-woo – presented Best New Artist
- Yeon Woo-jin and Han Groo – presented Best Dance Performance – Solo
- Henry Lau – introduced presenters Gao Zi Qi and Chae Rim
- Gao Zi Qi and Chae Rim – presented Best Collaboration
- Mike He – presented the special award for Style in Music
- Lee Kwang-soo and Song Ji-hyo – presented Best Male Group and Best Female Group
- Tiffany of Girls' Generation – presented John Legend
- Jeremy Lin via VTR – presented Favorite Music in China
- Jo Se-ho and Lee Kuk-ju – presented Best OST
- Yoon Jong-shin – Introduced performer IU
- South Korea President Park Geun-hye – Video greeting
- Eric Tsang and Park Bo-young – presented Best Vocal Performance – Male and Female
- Nam Joo-hyuk and Lee Jong-hyuk – presented Best Band Performance
- Alan Tam – introduced performer Kwak Jin-eon and presented the award for K-pop Fans' Choice – Male
- Yoon Jong-shin and Kang So-ra – presented Best Female Artist and Best Male Artist
- Forest Whitaker (via VTR) and Yoon Eun-hye – Talked about 'Bright Girls. Brighter Future!' UNESCO campaign
- Alan Tam and Yoon Eun-hye – presented Artist of the Year by country
- Kim Ji-suk – presented K-pop Fan's Choice – Female
- Lee Dong-wook and Yoo In-na – presented Best Dance Performance – Male and Female Group
- Oh Yeon-seo and Kim Ji-hoon – presented Best Rap Performance
- Jang Dong-min and Kyung Soo-jin – presented Best Music Video
- Song Seung-heon – presented the special award for The Most Popular Vocalist
- Kwon Sang-woo and Choi Ji-woo – presented Song of the Year
- Andy Lau – presented Album of the Year
- Song Seung-heon – Closing Remarks

== Winners and nominees ==
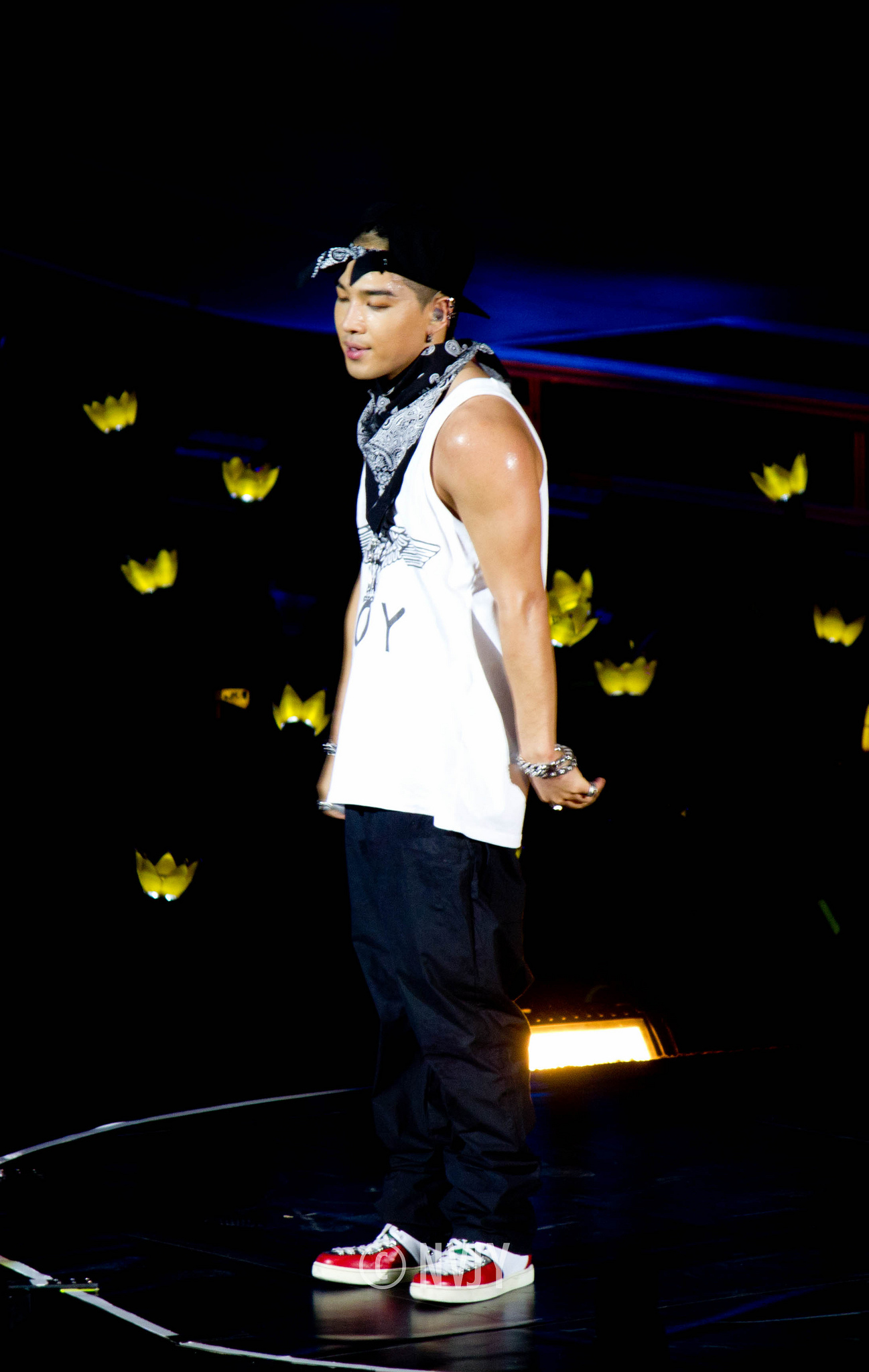
Taeyang, received multiple awards including Song of the Year

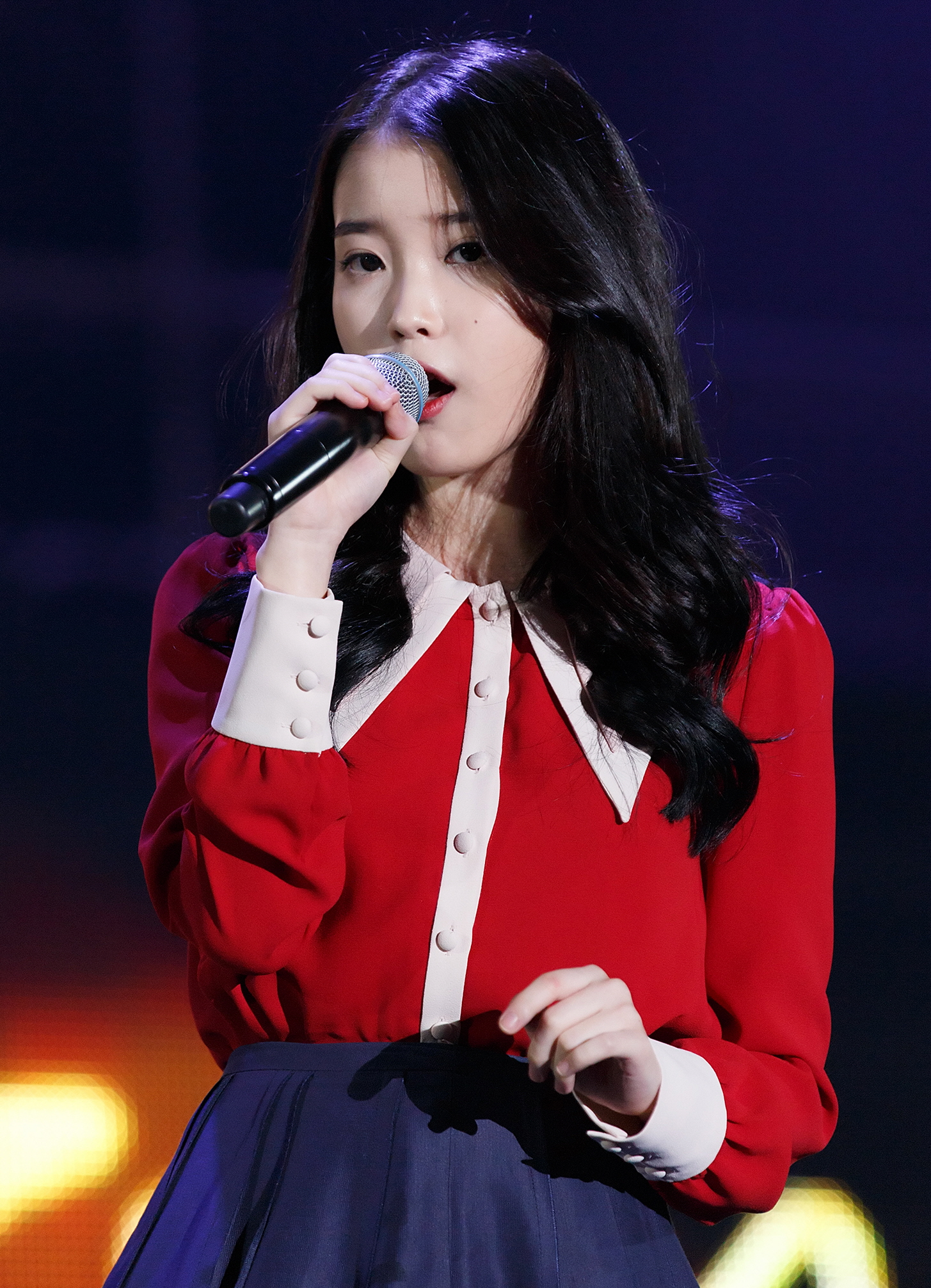
IU, Best Female Artist

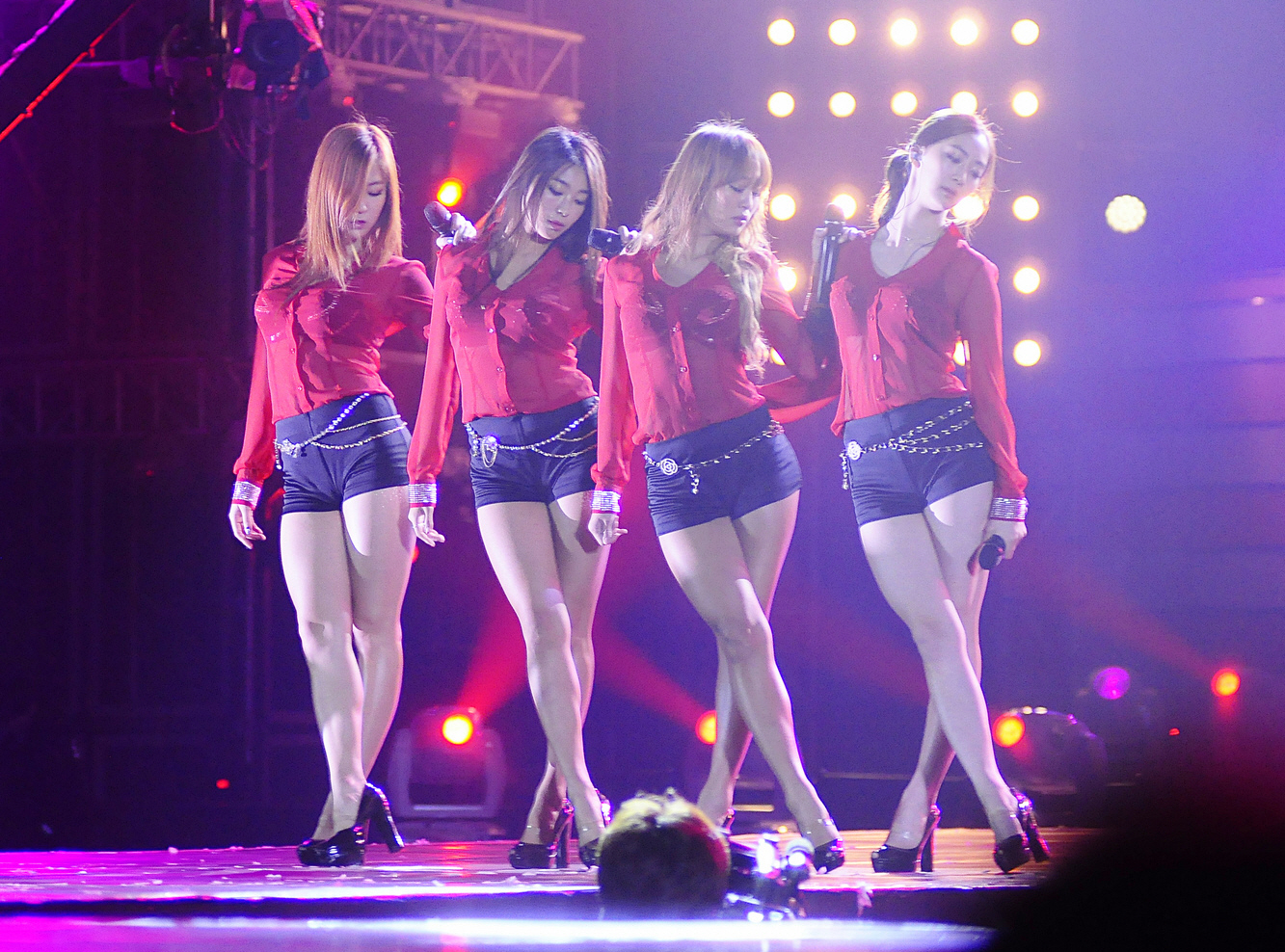
Sistar, Best Female Group

Best Dance Performance

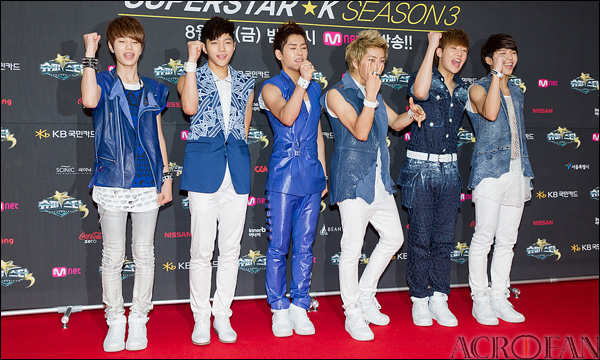
Infinite

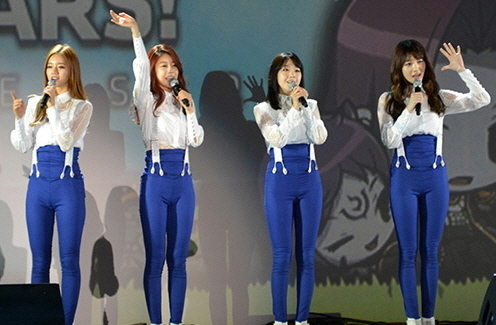
Girl's Day

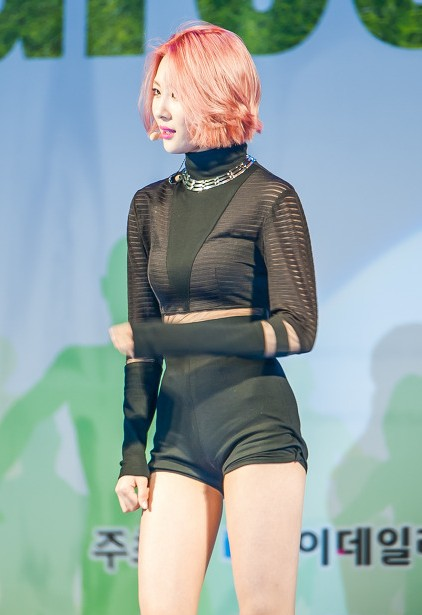
Sunmi

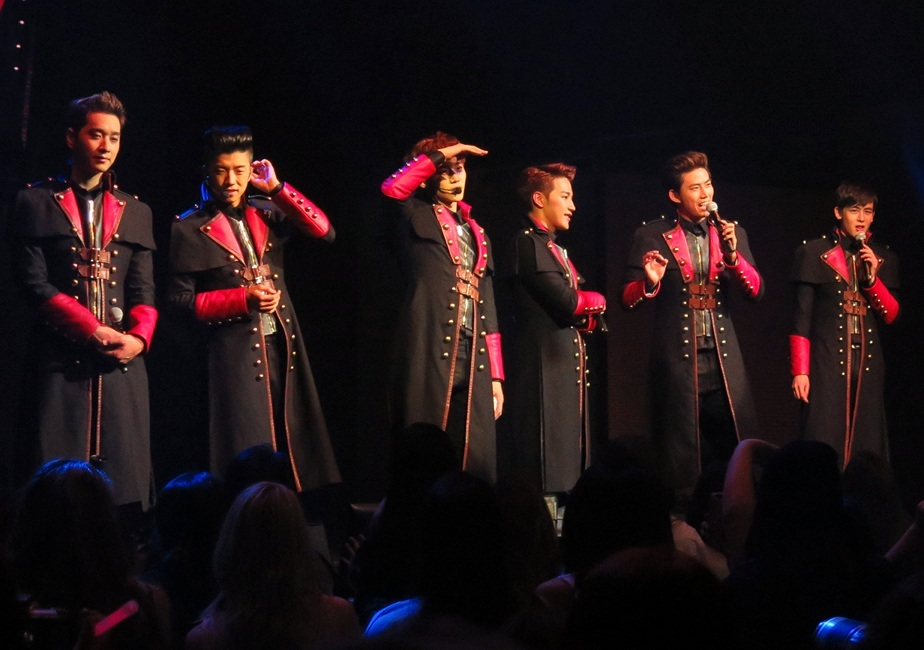
2PM, Best Music Video

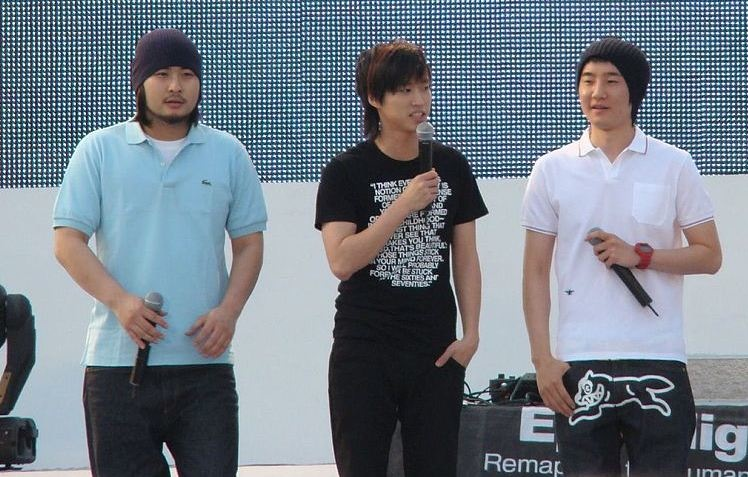
Epik High, Best Rap Performance

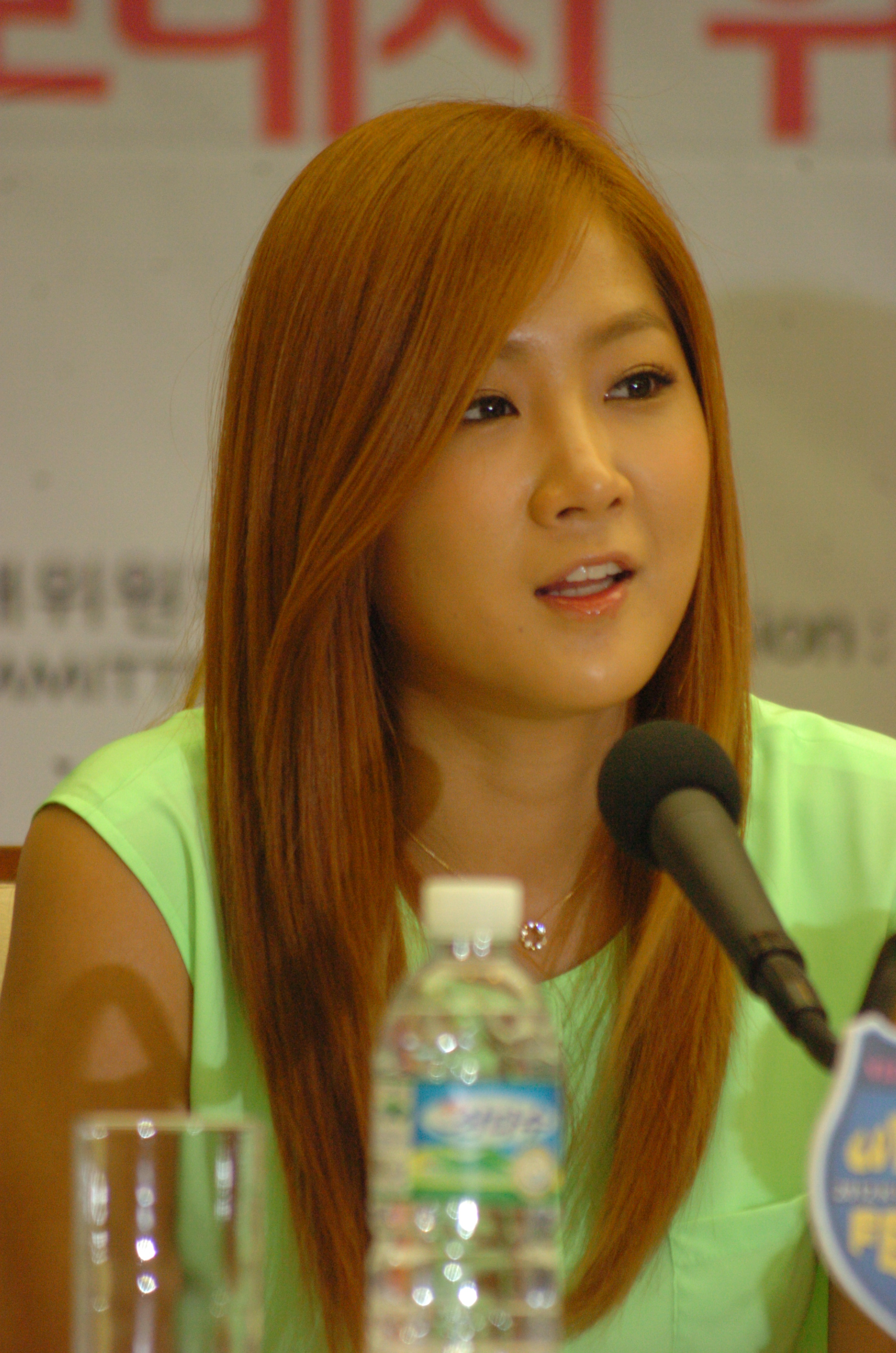
Soyou, Best Collaboration

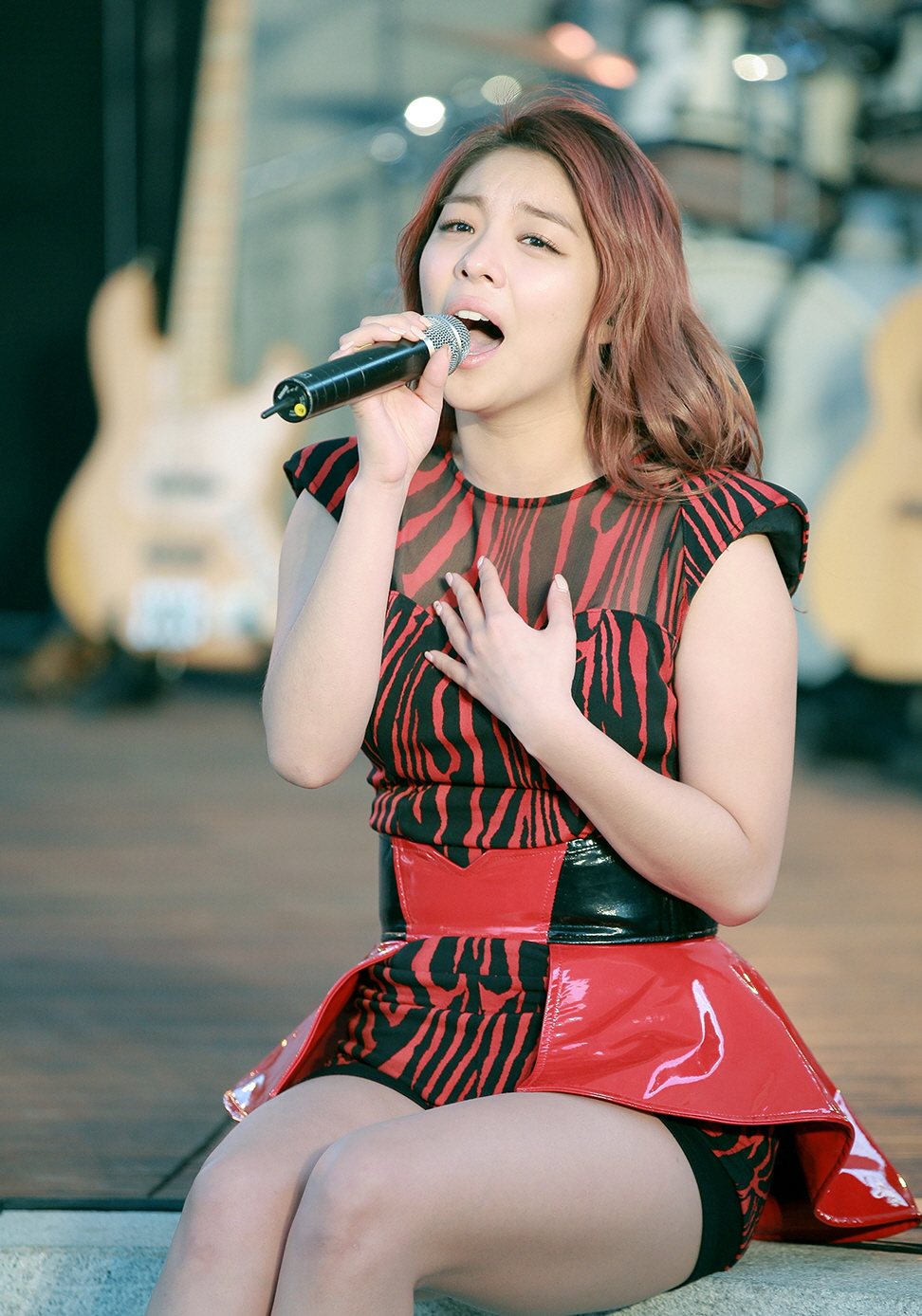
Ailee, Best Vocal Performance – Female

Winners are listed first and highlighted in boldface.

Album of the Year (Daesang)	Song of the Year (Daesang)
**Exo – Overdose**; Beast – Good Luck; Super Junior – Mamacita; Girls' Generation – Mr.Mr.; Infinite – Season 2	**Taeyang – "Eyes, Nose, Lips"**; Girl's Day – "Something"; Sistar – "Touch My Body"; IU – "Friday"; Exo – "Overdose"
Artist of the Year (Daesang)	Best Music Video
**Exo**; Taeyang; IU; Girls' Generation; 2NE1	**2PM – "Go Crazy!"**; Block B – "JackPot"; Seo Taiji – "Sogyeokdong"; Girls' Generation-TTS – "Holler"; Teen Top – "Missing"
Best Male Artist	Best Female Artist
**Taeyang**; Roy Kim; Rain; Seo Taiji; Im Chang-jung	**IU**; Sunmi; Ailee; Hyuna; Hyolyn
Best Male Group	Best Female Group
**Exo**; B1A4; Block B; Beast; Super Junior	**Sistar**; 2NE1; Girl's Day; Girls' Generation; A Pink
Best Dance Performance – Male Group	Best Dance Performance – Female Group
**Infinite – "Last Romeo"**; Exo – "Overdose"; VIXX – "Eternity"; TVXQ – "Something"; BTS – "Boy In Luv"	**Girl's Day – "Something"**; AOA – "Miniskirt"; Miss A – "Hush"; Sistar – "Touch My Body"; 4Minute – "Whatcha Doin' Today"
Best Dance Performance – Solo	Best Collaboration
**Sunmi – "Full Moon"**; Rain – "30 Sexy"; Ailee – "Don't Touch Me"; Hyuna – "Red"; Hyolyn – "One Way Love"	**Soyou and Junggigo – "Some"**; San E and Raina – "A Midsummer Night's Sweetness"; Seo In-guk and Zia – "Loved You"; Jung-in and Gary – "Your Scent"; Huh Gak and Eunji – "Break Up to Make Up"
Best Rap Performance	Best Band Performance
**Epik High – "Happen Ending"**; Gary – "Shower Later"; Gaeko – "No Make Up"; Mad Clown – "Without You"; San E – "Body Language"	**CNBLUE – "Can't Stop"**; F.T. Island – "Madly"; Nell – "Four Times Around The Sun"; Seo Taiji – "Christmalo.win"; Jung Joon-young – "Teenager"
Best Vocal Performance – Male	Best Vocal Performance – Female
**Taeyang – "Eyes, Nose, Lips"**; Kim Dong-ryool – "How I Am"; Roy Kim – "Home"; K.Will – "Day 1"; Wheesung – "Night And Day"	**Ailee – "Singing Got Better"**; Baek Ji-young – "Fervor"; IU – "Friday"; Younha – "Umbrella"; Lee Sun-hee – "Meet Him Among"
Best OST	Best New Artist
**Lyn – "My Destiny" (My Love from the Star)**; Lim Kim – "Happy Me" (Reply 1994); Davichi – "It's Okay, That's Love" (It's Okay, That's Love); Sung Si-kyung – "Every Moment of You" (My Love from the Star); Yoon Mi-rae – "I Love You" (It's Okay, That's Love)	**Winner**; Got7; Park Boram; Akdong Musician; Eddy Kim

Special Awards

- Best Asian Style: **Exo**
- International Favorite Artist: **John Legend**
- Style in Music: **Jung Joon-young**
- Favorite Music in China: **Chopstick Brothers – "Little Apple"**
- K-pop Fans' Choice – Male: **Infinite**
- K-pop Fan's Choice – Female: **Girls' Generation-TTS**
- Artist of the Year by country: **Hồ Quỳnh Hương**; **Thaitanium**; **Raisa Andriana**; **JJ Lin**; **Leo Ieiri**
- The Most Popular Vocalist: **IU**

== Multiple awards ==
=== Artist(s) with multiple wins ===
The following artist(s) received two or more wins (excluding the special awards):

Awards	Artist(s)
4	Exo
3	Taeyang

=== Artist(s) with multiple nominations ===
The following artist(s) received more than two nominations:

Nominations	Artist(s)
5	Exo
4	IU
4	Taeyang
3	Super Junior
3	Girls' Generation (Note: Including the sub-group, TTS.)
3	Girl's Day
3	Sistar
3	Seo Taiji
3	Ailee

== G-Dragon's performance ==
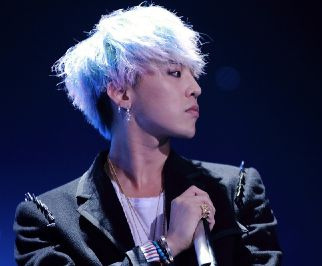
G-Dragon's opening rap performance garnered widespread attention among K-pop fans.

G-Dragon became the subject of widespread attention following a rap performance prior to performing "Good Boy" with bandmate Taeyang. He raps: "It's been a year, MAMA. Because you set such a large table/awards, you hand it out generously so your children don't fight". Observers saw that the performance was meant to criticize the award committee for giving out awards to popular artists too easily, even when there are more technically qualified artists for the award.

The reception of the performance was mostly positive. CNN Indonesia wrote that "2014 became an unforgettable MAMA event for K-Pop fans, especially BigBang fans" when "G-Dragon openly satirized the award ceremony on stage." In an article published by Yahoo! News Taiwan prior to the 2020 awards, an observer believed it to be one of the most legendary stages in MAMA history.
