= Petite France (theme park) =

French-themed cultural village in South Korea

Coordinates: 37.7150°N 127.4905°E

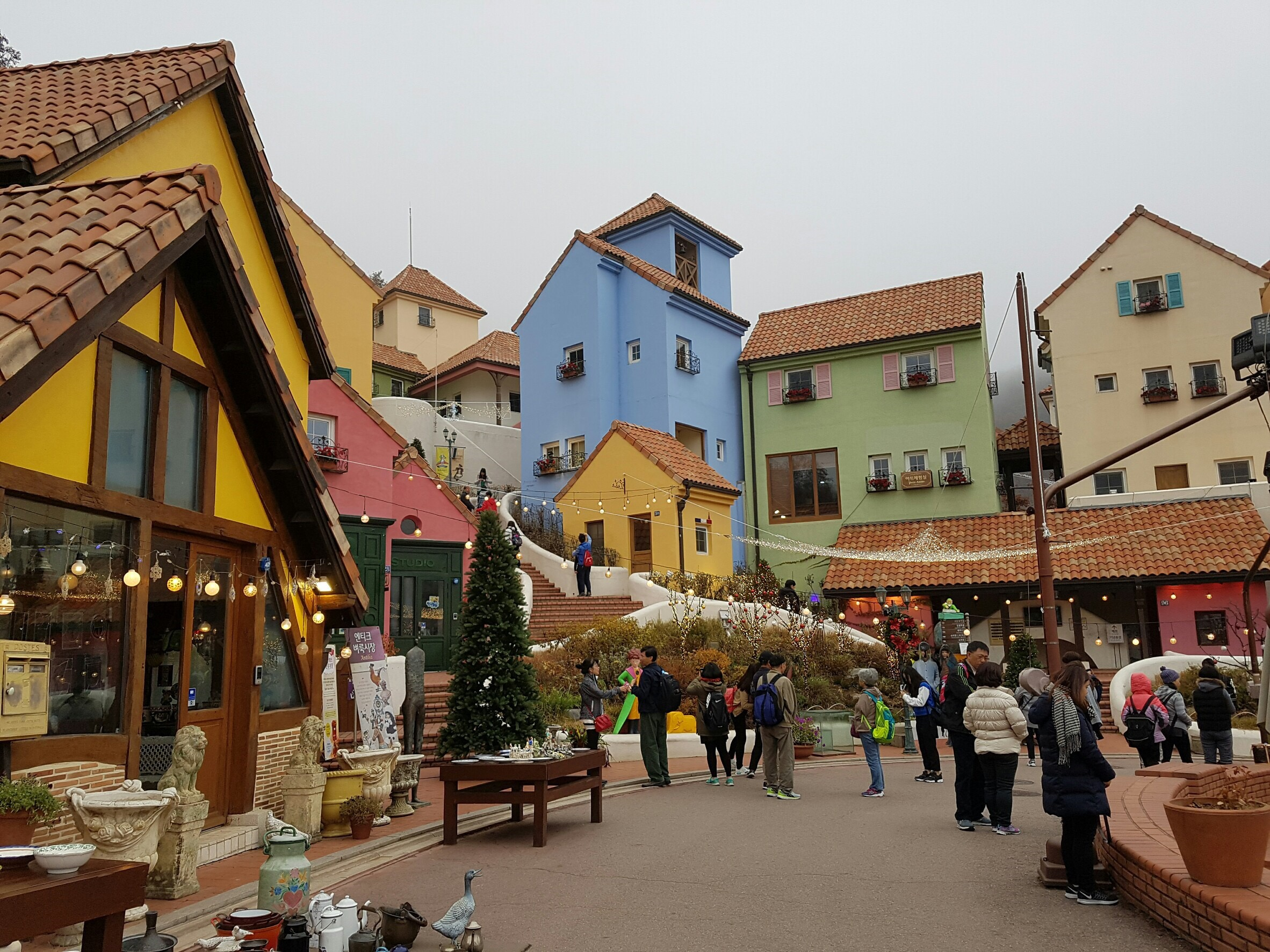
Petite France, Gapyeong

Petite France (쁘띠프랑스) is a French-style theme park that was constructed in July 2008 in Gyeonggi Province, South Korea. It consists of a theme park themed on the novel The Little Prince, a memorial to Saint-Exupéry, a gallery, an exhibition of French houses, and various shops, and has various performances such as music box demonstrations, puppet theatre orgel, and magical mime shows. The organisation is run by the castle youth retreat centre.

== Hours of operation ==
- 9 am to 6 pm

== Admission fees ==
	Admission fees
Adult	10000 won
Youth (middle and high school students)	8000 won
Child (36 months ~ elementary school student)	5,000 won
