= Lyn (singer) =

South Korean singer (born 1981)

Lee Se-jin
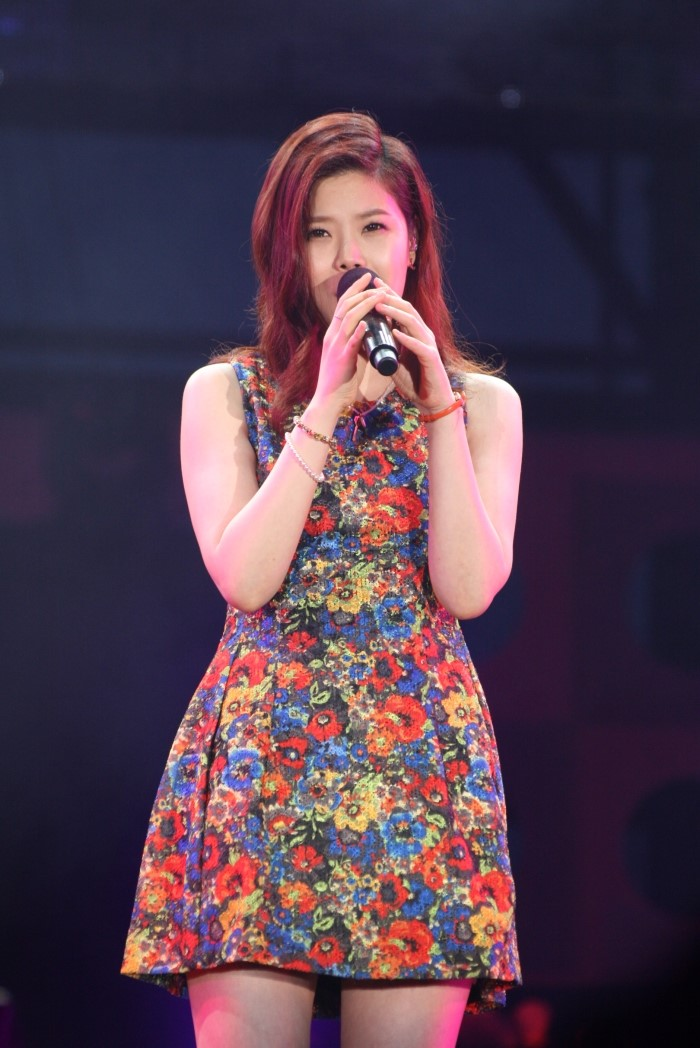
- Lyn in 2015

Background information
- Born: Lee Se-jin; 9 November 1981 (age 44); Namyangju, Gyeonggi, South Korea
- Genres: K-pop
- Occupation: Singer
- Years active: 2000–present
- Labels: Good Entertainment; Live Works Company; Jun Music Co.; Music&NEW; COMPANY919
- Spouse: ISU (m. 2014; div. 2025)

- Lyn
- Hangul: 이세진
- RR: I Sejin
- MR: I Sejin

Lee Se-jin (Korean: 이세진; born 9 November 1981), better known by the stage name Lyn (린), is a South Korean singer. She debuted in 2000 and rose to fame with the 2002 single "Have You Ever Been Hurt By Love?". She is best known for ballads and TV soundtrack appearances, including "Back in Time" from 2012's Moon Embracing the Sun, and the award-winning "My Destiny" from 2013's My Love From the Star.

== Career ==
Lyn made her singing debut in 2000 with the album My First Confession, released under her real name, Lee Se-jin. The album was unsuccessful, and Lyn temporarily quit her singing career.

She re-debuted under the stage name Lyn in 2002 with the album Have You Ever Had Heart Broken?, which included her breakthrough single "Have You Ever Been Hurt By Love?" (사랑에 아파 본 적 있나요?). Her next album, 2004's Can U See The Bright, was an even bigger success and spawned the hit single "We Were in Love" (사랑했잖아).

Lyn's next several albums were commercial successes. She released her third album, One and Only Feeling, with the lead single "Ordinary Woman" (보통여자), in 2005. She followed it up with 2006's Misty Memories, an album of remakes of popular South Korean songs from the 1980s and 1990s. In 2007, she released her fourth official album, The Pride of the Morning, which was the second best-selling album of March, according to Music Industry Association of Korea's monthly chart. The album's lead single, "Parting Life" (이별살이), performed well on the Bugs! digital song chart.

In 2008, Lyn collaborated with Shin Hye-sung of the boy band Shinhwa to release the album The Story of the Man and the Woman (그 남자 그 여자 이야기). The following year, she again saw commercial success with her digital single "Charisma" (featuring rapper MC Mong) and "Love.. It's All Lies" (사랑..다 거짓말), the lead single from her fifth album, Let Go, Let In, It's a New Day.

Lyn released her sixth album in two parts, with New Celebration released in 2009 and Candy Train in 2010. "Honey Baby Love" (자기야 여보야 사랑아), the lead single from Candy Train, was considered an upbeat departure from Lyn's trademark sad ballads and was a steady hit on several digital song charts. She also released her seventh album in two parts, releasing Metro Sexy 7 in 2011 and Love Fiction in 2012.

In 2012, Lyn sang "Back in Time" (시간을 거슬러) for the soundtrack to the period drama Moon Embracing the Sun. The song reached number one the weekly Gaon Digital Chart, was the best performing soundtrack on the chart for the first half of 2012, and ranked number 20 on the year-end chart, selling over three million copies.

She then sang "My Destiny" for My Love from the Star, for which she won Best Original Soundtrack at the 50th Baeksang Arts Awards in 2014. She is the first artist to win in the category. In 2015, she also sang "Just One Day" for melodrama Mask, followed by "Such Person" with 4MEN's Shin Young Jae for the drama Oh My Venus. In 2016 she sang "With You" for the drama Descendants of the Sun. After that, she sang "Love Story" for the main soundtrack of The Legend of the Blue Sea. In 2018, she collaborated with Hanhae on "LOVE", a song from the soundtrack of Are You Human?.

On 27 October 2015, Lyn's label MUSIC&NEW announced on through an official Facebook post that the singer's contract with the company had ended. She would be continuing promotions under her new individual music label COMPANY919.

== Personal life ==
Lyn married her longtime boyfriend ISU of MC the Max at Conrad Hotel Seoul on 19 September 2014. On August 23, 2025, Lyn's agency confirmed that the couple had recently divorced.

== Discography ==
=== Studio albums ===
Title	Album details	Peak chart position	Sales
Title	Album details	KOR	Sales
My First Confession	Released: 13 December 2000; Label: Daeyoung AV; Formats: CD, cassette; Track listing: 1. 이런 느낌 (Intro); 2. 기억; 3. Goodbye My Friend; 4. Yesterday New Day; 5. 미로; 6. Another Day; 7. 기회 (Please, Come Back); 8. 비밀; 9. Be; 10. Yesterday New Day; 11. Crystal; 12. Sentiment	—	—N/a
Have You Ever Had Heart Broken? (사랑에 아파본 적 있나요)	Released: 22 November 2002; Label: Bakjin; Formats: CD, cassette; Track listing: 1. Flying High; 2. New Day(Feat. CB MASS); 3. 사랑에 아파본 적 있나요; 4. 아직도 사랑하는데...; 5. 제발; 6. 또 다른 시작; 7. 이제는 그만; 8. 단 한번 그대를 위한 일 9. Time; 10. 니가 아닌 너 (Because I Love You); 11. 부탁해요; 12. S.H.A; 13. First Love; 14. 데미지	32	KOR: 25,115
Can U See The Bright	Released: 26 March 2004; Label: Genie Showbiz; Formats: CD, cassette; Track listing: 1. Intro (See The Light); 2. 인사; 3. ...사랑했잖아...; 4. Time Enough; 5. 사막에서 꿈꾸다...; 6. Come 2 Me; 7. Baby Tonight; 8. Spring Fever (Feat. Double K); 9. 사랑이 올 때... (Duet With 박효신); 10. 들리니...; 11. 헤어져! (Featuring 허인창); 12. Stay With Me; 13. ...사랑했잖아... (MR)	22	KOR: 64,902
One And Only Feeling	Released: 16 June 2005; Label: Genie Showbiz; Formats: CD, cassette; Track listing: 1. 결혼재줘요; 2. 낮이 사라진밤 (feat. Eddie); 3. 보통여자; 4. Wedding Song; 5. 어떡하라고; 6. 그녀에게; 7. 날 모르죠 (feat. 휘성); 8. Naughty Girl; 9. 물망초; 10. 버려	10	KOR: 32,026
Misty Memories (Remake album)	Released: 13 March 2006; Label: Tube Media; Formats: CD, cassette; Track listing: 1. Intro: Go Back; 2. 이병여행; 3. 날 위한 이별; 4. 난 남자가 있는데; 5. 바보 같은 미소; 6. 보이네; 7. 그대 안의 블루 (duet with 김태우); 8. 키 작은 하늘; 9. 보고싶어 얼굴; 10. 미련; 11. 천일동안	27	KOR: 2,940
The Pride of the Morning	Released: 7 March 2007; Label: Good Entertainment; Formats: CD; Track listing: 1. 키스 유 2. 마음이 시키는 일 3. 이별살이; 4. 사랑했잖아 Pt. 2; 5. 눈물이 모를까요; 6. 궁금해; 7. 미칠것 캍다; 8. 죄송합니다; 9. 집으로; 10. 눈을 떠도 감아도; 11. Lovelyn (feat. Crown J); 12. For The Dream	2	KOR: 25,171
The Story of the Man and the Woman (그 남자 그 여자 이야기) with Shin Hye-sung	Released: 27 February 2008; Label: Good Entertainment; Formats: CD, digital download	—	—N/a
Let Go, Let In, Is A New Day	Released: 13 January 2009; Label: Mnet Media; Formats: CD, digital download; Track listing: 1. 사랑노래; 2. 노래편지; 3. 사랑… 다 걱짓말; 4. 철부지; 5. 므네모시네; 6. 기억을 가져가; 7. 공감; 8. 하소연; 9. 매력쟁이 (with MC뭉); 10. 데이트	—N/a	—N/a
New Celebration (Half Album). Part 1	Released: 27 October 2009; Label: KT Music; Formats: CD, digital download; Track listing: 1. New Celebration; 2. 누나의 노래 (ft. E.Via); 3. 실화 타이틀곡; 4. 사랑해, 사랑해; 5. 통화연결은; 6. 실화 (New Edit Inst.)	—N/a	—N/a
Candy Train (Half Album). Part 2	Released: 13 May 2010; Label: KT Music; Formats: CD, digital download; Track listing: 1. 데이트 해줘요; 2. 자기야 여보야 사랑아; 3. 아! 아!; 4. 특별한 날 5. 달관한 마음	8	—N/a
Le Grand Bleu	Released: 6 March 2014; Label: Music&NEW; Formats: CD, digital download; Track listing: 1. 보고싶다… 운다; 2. 우리 심장 (ft. 용준형 of 비스트); 3. 뒤에서 안아줘; 4. Song for Love (한국 ver.); 5. 우리를 어떡해; 6. 오늘 밤 (ft. 배치기); 7. 히할이 (ft. 주연); 8. 공기 속에 녹았는지; 9. 잘해준 것 밖에 없는데; 10. Song for Love (언이 ver.); 11. 보고 싶어 운다 (instr.); 12. 오늘 밤 (instr.)	19	KOR: 1,000
9X9th	Released: 9 September 2015; Label: Music&NEW; Formats: CD, digital download; Track listing: 1. 사랑은 그렇게 또 다른 누구에게; 2. 이별주; 3. 주정 블루스; 4. 나 하나만 남겨줘요; 5. Only you 6. 나를 봐요; 7. 아무도 모르게; 8. 청사포; 9. 그리움은 사랑이 아니더이다	16	KOR: 798
#10	Released: 25 October 2018; Label: 325 E&C; Formats: CD, digital download; Track listing: 1. 노래뿐이라서; 2. 이별의 운도; 3. 별처럼; 4. 두 마음에 빛이 나 5. 말해봐; 6. 뻔한 노래; 7. 너는, 책 8. 취한 밤 9. 엄마의 꿈 10. 이별의 운도 (instr.)	55	—N/a
"—" denotes release did not chart. "N/A" denotes data unavailable.

=== Live albums ===
Title	Album details	Peak chart position	Sales
Title	Album details	KOR	Sales
Home	Released: 12 September 2014; Label: Music&NEW; Formats: CD, digital download	30	KOR: 594

=== Compilation albums ===
Title	Album details	Peak chart position	Sales
Title	Album details	KOR	Sales
The Essential LYn	Released: 24 June 2014; Label: Music&NEW; Formats: CD, digital download; Track listing CD 1: 1. 사랑에 아파본 적 있나요; 2. …사랑했잖아…; 3. …사랑했잖아…Part 2; 4. 사랑… 다 거짓말; 5. 마음이 시키는 일 6. 어떡하라고; 7. 이별살이; 8. 보통 여자; 9. 인사; 10. 기억을 가져가; 11. 다 알면서 (LYn ver.); 12. 물망초 (원곡: " WILL " – NAKASHIMA MIKA); 13. 집으로; 14. 철부지; 15. 눈을 떠도 감아도; CD 2: 1. (Duet with 신혜성) from Special album 2. Lovelyn (feat. Crown J); 3. Kissing U 4. 매력쟁이 (feat. MC몽); 5. Love Song; 6. 키스해주겠니 (feat. Eddie); 7. Naughty Girl; 8. 내 남자; 9. Spring Fever (feat. Double K); 10. 눈물이 마를까요 (feat. 강태우); 11. 므네모시네 (Mnemosyne); 12. 궁금해 (feat. 에릭); 13. 데이트; 14. 결혼해줘요	12	KOR: 1,391

=== Extended plays ===
Title	Album details	Peak chart position	Sales
Title	Album details	KOR	Sales
Metro Sexy 7.	Released: 14 July 2011; Label: KT Music; Formats: CD, digital download	—	—N/a
LoveFiction	Released: 16 March 2012; Label: MUSIC&NEW; Formats: CD, digital download	—	—N/a
Joue Avec Moi	Released: 14 July 2017; Label: COMPANY919; Formats: CD, digital download	48	—N/a
"—" denotes release did not chart. "N/A" denotes data unavailable.

=== Singles ===
==== As lead artist ====
Title	Year	Peak chart positions	Sales (DL)	Album
Title	Year	KOR	Sales (DL)	Album
"Christmas Carol"	2002	—		Non-album single
"Have You Ever Been Hurt By Love?" (사랑에 아파 본 적 있나요?)	2002	—		Have You Ever Had Heart Broken?
"We Were in Love" (사랑했잖아)	2004	168		Can U See the Bright
"Ordinary Woman" (보통여자)	2004	—		One and Only Feeling
"For Me, Goodbye" (날 위한 이별)	2006	—		Misty Memories
"Parting Life" (이별살이)	2007	—		The Pride of the Morning
"Kissing U"	2007	—		The Pride of the Morning (Special Edition)
"It's You" (그대죠)	2008	—		Her Story
"I Know (Lyn's Version)" (다 알면서)	2008	—		Her Story
"Charisma" (매력쟁이) (feat. MC Mong)	2008	—		Non-album single
"Love.. It's All Lies" (사랑..다 거짓말)	2009	—		Let Go, Let In, It's A New Day
"New Celebration" (feat. Doki)	2009	—		6 1/2 New Celebration
"True Story" (실화)	2009	—		6 1/2 New Celebration
"Refresh" (새로고침) (feat. Seo In-guk)	2010	51		Director's Cut
"Honey, Baby Love" (자기야 여보야 사랑아)	2010	13		6th Part 2 'Candy Train'
"We Were In Love + We Were In Love, Part 2 (A-Live)" (사랑했잖아 + 사랑했잖아 Part 2 (A-Live))	2010	—		A-Live Vol. 15 린의 다락방 'Lovelyn'
"Blizzard of Love" (사랑의 눈보라)	2010	39		Winter's Melody
"Love Me For Me"	2011	39	KOR: 446,580	Metro Sexy 7.
"Rain On Me" (비를 내려줘요)	2012	7	KOR: 653,488	LoveFiction
"Teddy Bear" (곰인형) (feat. Haegeum)	2012	5	KOR: 1,602,435	LoveFiction
"Tonight" (오늘 밤) (feat. Baechigi)	2013	3	KOR: 1,116,295	Le Grand Bleu
"Glass Heart" (유리 심장)	2013	10	KOR: 672,465	Le Grand Bleu
"I Like This Song" (이 노래 좋아요)	2013	8	KOR: 403,785	Le Grand Bleu
"Miss You... Crying" (보고 싶어...운다)	2014	3	KOR: 564,933	Le Grand Bleu
"Blossom Tears" (꽃잎놀이) (with VIXX's Leo)	2014	11	KOR: 202,041	Y.BIRD from Jellyfish with LYn X Leo
"Thank You My Dear" (고마워요 나의 그대여)	2014	57	KOR: 95,722	2014 LYn 1st Live Album 'Home'
"Farewell" (정말 헤어지는 거야) (with George)	2019	58	—N/a	Non-album singles
"Fuzzy Peach" (그 여름 밤 린)	2020	—	—N/a	Non-album singles
"Night We Shine" (백야)	2022	102	—N/a	Non-album singles
"—" denotes releases that did not chart or were not released in that region. Note: Gaon Chart was established in February 2010. Releases before this date have no chart data.

==== Collaborations ====
Title	Year	Peak chart positions	Sales (DL)	Album
Title	Year	KOR	Sales (DL)	Album
"A Letter To You" (with MC Mong	2004	—		Vol. 1 – 180 Degree
"Love… After" (사랑…후에) (with Shin Hye-sung)	2006	—		
"I Say Ya, You Say Ye!" (내가 야! 하면 넌 예!) (with Kim Tae-woo)	2009	—		T-Virus
"Regrets" (늦은 후회) (with Kim Hyung-suk)	2011	—		Non-album single
"Chu! Pop! Chu!" (with Na Yoon Kwon)	2011	35	KOR: 540,694	나는 작사가다 Season 02
"Walking Dead" (좀비) (with Kim Jin-pyo)	2013	39	KOR: 132,529	JP7
"Brushing By" (스치다) (with Kim Junsu)	2013	—		Musical December 2013 with Kim Junsu
"Surrender" (with Chancellor)	2016	—		My Full Name
"—" denotes releases that did not chart or were not released in that region. Note: Gaon Chart was established in February 2010. Releases before this date have no chart data.

=== Soundtrack appearances ===
Title	Year	Peak chart positions	Sales (DL)	Album
Title	Year	KOR	Sales (DL)	Album
"Stay With Me"	2004	—		Save The Last Dance For Me OST
"My Farewell Begins"	2005	—		101st Proposal OST
"First Person"	2006	—		Bad Family OST
"Love... After"	2007	—		Winter Story (Music Drama) OST
"Do You Know?" (아나요)	2008	—		I Love You OST
"Yesterday"	2009	—		Triangle (Telecinema) OST
"Two As One (Love Theme)" (둘이 하나) (feat. Gilgu Bonggu's Bonggu)	2010	44		My Girlfriend Is a Nine-Tailed Fox OST Part 4
"Tears, I Just Cry" (그냥 눈물이 나)	2010	—		Home Sweet Home OST Part 4
"Don't Know Very Well" (잘 알지도 못하면서)	2011	47	KOR: 334,887	Protect the Boss OST Part 2
"Rain On Me"	2012	—		The Sun and the Moon OST
"Back In Time" (시간을 거슬러)	2012	1	KOR: 3,025,492	Moon Embracing the Sun OST Part 2
"My Destiny"	2013	2	KOR: 1,074,581	My Love from the Star OST Part 1
"One Day" (단 하루)	2015	—		Mask OST Part 1
"That Person (Duet Ver.)" (그런 사람)	2015	—		Oh My Venus OST Part 4
"That Person (Woman Ver.)" (그런 사람)	2015	—		Oh My Venus OST Part 7
"With You"	2016	15	KOR: 518,695	Descendants of the Sun OST Part 7
"Wanna Be Free "	2016	—		Dear My Friends OST Part 3
"Love Story"	2016	21	KOR: 252,648	The Legend of the Blue Sea OST Part 1
"LOVE"	2018	100	KOR: 6,536,156	Are You Human? OST Part 2
"Moonchild Ballad" (월아연가/月兒戀歌)	2020	105		Tale of the Nine Tailed OST Part 3
"One and Only" (알아요)	2021	— (Note: "One and Only" did not enter the Gaon Digital Chart but peaked at number 22 on the component Download Chart.)		The King's Affection OST Part 2
"Open Your Heart"	2022			Forecasting Love and Weather OST Part 9
"—" denotes releases that did not chart or were not released in that region. Note: Gaon Chart was established in February 2010. Releases before this date have no chart data.

=== Music videos ===
Title	Year
"Have You Ever Been Hurt By Love?"	2002
"A Greeting"	2004
"We Were In Love"	2004
"Ordinary Woman"	2005
"Naughty Girl"	2005
"What Do I Do?"	2005
"For Me, Goodbye"	2006
"Little Sky"	2006
"Just One Love"	2006
"Love… After"	2006
"Parting Life"	2007
"We Were In Love, Part 2"	2007
"It's You"	2008
"Do You Know?"	2008
"Charisma"	2008
"Love.. It's All Lies"	2009
"New Celebration"	2009
"True Story"	2009
"Making Memories"	2010
"Honey, Baby Love"	2010
"Tears, I Just Cry"	2010
"Blizzard of Love"	2010
"Love Me for Me"	2011
"Don't Know Very Well"	2011
"Chu! Pop! Chu!"	2011
"Back in Time"	2012
"Teddy Bear"	2012
"Rain On Me"	2012
"Glass Heart"	2013
"I Like This Song"	2013
"My Destiny"	2014
"Missing You... Crying"	2014
"Blossom Tears"	2014
"Thank You My Love"	2014

== Awards and nominations ==
Year	Award	Category	Song	Result
2004	6th Mnet Asian Music Awards	Best R&B Performance	"Used to Love"	Nominated
2012	14th Mnet Asian Music Awards	Best OST	"Back in Time" ( Moon Embracing the Sun OST)	Nominated
2012	5th Korea Drama Awards	Best OST	"Back in Time" ( Moon Embracing the Sun OST)	Won
2013	15th Mnet Asian Music Awards	Best Vocal Performance	"Breakable Heart"	Nominated
2014	50th Baeksang Arts Awards	Best OST	"My Destiny" (My Love from the Star OST)	Won
2014	9th Seoul International Drama Awards	Outstanding Korean Drama OST	"My Destiny" (My Love from the Star OST)	Won
2014	6th MelOn Music Awards	Best OST	"My Destiny" (My Love from the Star OST)	Won
2014	16th Mnet Asian Music Awards	Best OST	"My Destiny" (My Love from the Star OST)	Won
2014	Yahoo Asia Buzz Award	Top Searched Song of the Year	"My Destiny" (My Love from the Star OST)	Won
2014	Seoul Music Awards	Best OST	"My Destiny" (My Love from the Star OST)	Won
