= Choi Jin-hee (entrepreneur) =

South Korean television producer (born 1968)

- 최진희
- Born: October 4, 1968 (age 58); South Korea
- Other name: Jinnie Choi
- Education: Sungshin Women's University (B.A. in French Literature, College of Humanities); INSEEC Business School (Master of Advertising Marketing)
- Occupations: Television Producer; Entrepreneur
- Years active: 1993–present

Korean name
- Hangul: 최진희
- Hanja: 崔珍熙
- RR: Choe Jinhui
- MR: Ch'oe Chinhŭi

Choi Jin-hee (Korean: 최진희; Born November 9, 1968) is a South Korean television producer and businesswoman. Choi Jin-hee is the chief executive officer at Imaginus, a content production company that she established in December 2021. Choi also serves as the Executive Advisor of Myriagon Studio, a subsidiary of Aniplex, since June 2023.

In 2012, Choi began her career as producer in CJ E&M's drama business division. She then served as the first CEO of Studio Dragon from May 2016 to July 2020. During her tenure, Choi ranked 14th in 2019 Forbes Korea 65 Powerful Female CEOs. In the same year she was selected as the winner of the CEO Leadership Award in the 2019 Media Management Award by The Media Future Research Institute. After leaving Studio Dragon, she was promoted to the role of Director of Film and Drama Business at CJ ENM, where she served from July 2020 to November 2021.

== Education ==
Choi Jin-hee was born on October 4, 1968. She enrolled in the Department of French Language and Literature at Sungshin Women's University, graduating with a B.A. in French Literature from the College of Humanities. Later, she received a master's degree in advertising marketing from INSEEC Business School in France.

== Career ==
=== Early career ===
In 1993, Choi started working at Dentsu, Young and Rubicam Korea (DYR Korea), (Note: A joint venture company of Doosan Group subsidiary Oricom, Japan's Dentsu, and USA-based Young and Rubicam. Dissolved in 2003.) where she was involved in advertising production. She later moved to Daewoo Video Business Division, where Choi took charge of foreign films import.

After joining On-Media, Choi assumed the role of the head of the content acquisition team. On October 31, 2010, she was promoted to an executive position as the Film Business Manager. In 2011, On-Media was acquired by CJ E&M, marking the beginning of Choi's career within CJ Group. On October 17, 2012, Choi was further promoted to the position of Head of CJ E&M Channel 1. Later, on January 28, 2013, she was elevated to the position of Managing Director (Sangmu). Her most recent role was as the head of CJ E&M's Content Business Department and Drama Business Department, where she was well-known as an executive producer for notable dramas such as Misaeng and Oh My Ghost.

=== Studio Dragon ===
Choi was appointed as Chief executive officer when Studio Dragon was founded on May 3, 2016, as a spin-off from CJ E&M's Drama Business Department. Studio Dragon was created with a focus on drama planning, production, and distribution. Unlike many production companies that rely on broadcasting companies, Studio Dragon independently plans and produces its own works by analyzing market demands and target audiences.

Under Choi's leadership, Studio Dragon had a strategic focus on mergers and acquisitions, particularly targeting television drama production companies associated with successful drama writers. Culture Depot, where writer Park Ji-eun belongs, which had been acquired by CJ E&M in January 2016, was reorganized as a subsidiary of Studio Dragon. In May 2016, Studio Dragon further expanded its portfolio through equity swaps with Hwa&Dam Pictures, renowned for writer Kim Eun-sook, Additionally, in September 2016, Studio Dragon engaged in equity swaps with KPJ, well-known for writers Kim Young-hyun and Park Sang-yeon.

In September 2016, Choi on behalf of Studio Dragon signed a memorandum of understanding (MOU) with Warner Bros.'s DramaFever. During the Broadcast World Wide Convention (BCWW) opening ceremony in Seoul, Craig Hunegs, the president of business and strategy at Warner Bros., revealed that the two companies would also be exploring the potential for remaking existing films and TV shows under their co-production agreement.

Under Choi's leadership, Studio Dragon successfully transitioned into a listed company. On November 24, 2017, Studio Dragon conducted an initial public offering (IPO) and became a publicly traded entity on the KOSDAQ. Preceding the IPO, on November 9, 2017, Choi held a press conference in Yeouido, Seoul, during which she said, "Through listing on KOSDAQ, we will solidify our position as number one in domestic market share by 2020 and continue to grow overseas sales to become a major global studio." She also emphasized that a stable profit structure was established based on original intellectual property rights (IP). In the past, IP ownership was owned by broadcasting companies, but Studio Dragon directly owns the IP based on its excellent creator planning ability. Choi also set a goal to increase Studio Dragon's domestic drama market share to 40% by 2020 and increasing overseas sales by an average of 30% per year.

By early 2018, Studio Dragon had emerged as the leading South Korean TV drama production company, commanding approximately 20% of the market share in terms of the number of TV dramas broadcast in 2017. Studio Dragon records a high profit margin of 60% on average.

According to media reports, in June 2018, Studio Dragon entered into a licensing agreement with Netflix for the distribution of their tentpole work, Mr. Sunshine, a historical drama comprising 24 episodes. This deal held great significance for the studio as it represented their first exclusive distribution arrangement. The licensing fee for the series amounted to ₩28 billion, which equated to 70% of the production cost of Mr. Sunshine, estimated at ₩43 billion. In the end of the year, Studio Dragon became a subsidiaries of CJ ENM after their previous parent company, CJ E&M, was merged into CJ ENM.

In March, 28, Choi announced Studio Dragon acquisition of a full equity stake (200,000 shares) in GTist, a drama production company owned by Noh Hee-kyung, Kim Kyu-tae, and Hong Jong-chan, for KRW 25 billion in cash. Noh Hee-kyung made her debut in 1995 and has long career as drama writer, with notable works including Worlds Within, That Winter, the Wind Blows, It's Okay, That's Love, Dear My Friends, and Live. Director Kim Kyu-tae has collaborated with writer Noh Hee-kyung in many projects such as Worlds Within, That Winter, the Wind Blows, It's Okay, That's Love, and Live. Meanwhile Director Hong Jong-chan has directed dramas such as Doctor Stranger, Dear My Friends, and Her Private Life.

Through acquisition of Culture Depot, Hwa&Dam Pictures, KPJ, and GTist, Studio Dragon have recruited many talents, reaching 183 people as of the second quarter of 2019. In September, Choi announced that Studio Dragon has acquired an about 20% equity share in Movierock, a movie production company. Founded in 2012, Movierock (CEO Kim Jae-joong) is a domestic film production company that is recognized for its excellent planning and production ability by successively releasing films such as Thread of Lies, Midnight Runners, Be With You, Innocent Witness, and Tune in for Love.

In November 2019, Studio Dragon and Netflix signed a production and distribution agreement. The three-year agreement, effective in 2020, involved Studio Dragon creating original series that would be globally distributed by Netflix on its platform. Additionally, Netflix acquired distribution rights to certain titles from Studio Dragon that were not included in the partnership. The deal followed pre-existing ties between CJ, Studio Dragon, and Netflix, resulting in the streaming of series such as Stranger, Mr. Sunshine, Memories of the Alhambra, Romance Is A Bonus Book, and Arthdal Chronicles.

In December 2019, Choi announced that Studio Dragon had successfully acquired a 19% stake in Merrycow Creative, a production company owned by Song Jae-jung who wrote Memories of the Alhambra and Nine.

Choi's leadership played a pivotal role in Studio Dragon sales growth from ₩200 million in 2016 to ₩4.7 billion by the end of 2019. As part of 2020 executive reshuffle, CJ Group made an announcement on December 30, 2019, promoting 58 individuals, including Choi Jin-hee. In this reshuffle, Choi, previously serving as executive vice president, was promoted to vice chairman rank. Choi's was the first female executive to achieve such a rank through internal promotion within CJ Group.

On July 16, 2020, CJ ENM announced leadership changes at Studio Dragon. Choi was promoted as the director of the newly established Film and Drama Division at CJ ENM. Kang Cheol-gu, the Management Planning Director of Studio Dragon, and Kim Young-gyu, the First Production Director of Studio Dragon, were selected as the new co-CEOs of Studio Dragon, taking over Choi's previous position.

On August 31 of the same year, Choi exercised options on 21,840 shares of Studio Dragon stock at an exercise price of ₩27,500 per share. With a closing price of ₩82,100 on September 8, it appeared that a 200% valuation return was achieved. Studio Dragon had granted Choi 72,800 shares as stock options for being the first CEO of Studio Dragon in 2016. The first time Choi exercised stock options was in August 2019, when she exercised options for 21,840 shares. Therefore, a total of 43,680 stock options had been exercised so far, leaving 29,120 shares unexercised. Through this stock option exercise, Choi earned a market profit of ₩2.4 billion. Considering the remaining shares, the value of Choi's stake in Studio Dragon amounted to ₩6 billion.

=== Imaginus ===
In November 2021, Choi departed from her position in CJ ENM before the end of her term, which was originally scheduled to conclude in March 2022. Following her departure, Choi establish a new company called Imaginus (이매지너스) on December 15, 2021. Imaginus operates as a comprehensive content production company. Initially capitalized at ₩10 million, Imaginus attracted investment of ₩50 billion from J&Private Equity (J&PE) on December 8. According to an industry official, J&PE's investment in Imaginus was made at a corporate value of around ₩200 billion. It is said that the follow-up investment aims to increase the corporate value to ₩1 trillion.

In August 2022, Choi was recognized as one of "Korea's 100 female startup leaders" by Hankyung Geeks and Startup Alliance. The selection was based on factors such as cumulative investment amount, experience, and industry. The list showcased the top female startup representatives in 10 different industries, including Education, Fashion & Beauty, E-commerce, Finance & Insurance, Healthcare, Living & Space, Food Tech, Content & Social, Leisure & Travel, and Advertising & Marketing. Choi, representing Imaginus, ranked first in the Content & Social category and 9th overall.

Choi signed a strategic partnership between Imaginus and Myriagon Studio. Myriagon Studio, formerly known as Origamix Partners Inc, is a management company led by Shinsuke Sato, renowned for his original Netflix series Alice In Borderland. The rebranding took place following the acquisition of Origamix Partners Inc by Aniplex, a subsidiary of Sony Music Entertainment Japan. Starting from June 1, 2023, Choi appointed as Executive Advisor at Myriagon Studio in order to help establish a formidable Asian premium production network.

In the summer of 2023, Choi collaborated with Hwang Ji-young and Kim Hee-won to establish Studio Abit. Hwang Ji-young is a renowned entertainment show director, recognized for her work on MBC's I Live Alone from 2017 to 2021, which earned her accolades such as the 2018 Korean Broadcasting Awards Producer Award and the 2020 MBC Special Achievement Award. Her last MBC project was With the Silk of Dohpo Flying in Denmark. Hwang oversees the entertainment department at Studio Abit, while director Kim Hee-won, known for directing Little Women and Vincenzo, oversees the drama department.

Studio Abit was established as a joint venture between Imaginus and Innocean, an advertising production house affiliated with Hyundai Motor. The studio's primary focus is to create relatable and enjoyable commercial content, including entertainment shows, dramas, and films. Leveraging the expertise of talented creators, Studio Abit aims to accelerate production and deliver high-quality projects. The signing ceremony for Studio Abit took place on August 7 at Innocean's Seoul headquarters, with key executives in attendance, including Innocean CEO Lee Yong-woo, Imaginus CEO Choi Jin-hee, and Studio Abit CEO Hwang Ji-young.

On March 21, 2024, Choi and Adam Burke, the Director of the Los Angeles Tourism Office, signed a memorandum of understanding (MoU) to collaborate on producing a Korean drama set in Los Angeles and promoting the city as a global tourism destination. This marks the first time a U.S. city tourism office has entered into a content production MoU, establishing a three-year partnership. In November 2024, Choi also signed a content joint development partnership with Japan's Asahi Broadcasting Corporation (ABC TV) to develop Japanese dramas combining Korean and Japanese production expertise. Imaginus received the 10 Million Dollar Export Tower Award at the 61st Trade Day in December 2024.

== Filmography ==
=== CJ E&M/CJ ENM ===
Drama credits
Year	Title		Network	Credited as		Notes	Ref.
Year	English	Korean	Network	Producer	Planner	Notes	Ref.
2012	Vampire Prosecutor Season 2	뱀파이어 검사 2	OCN	Lee Seung-hoon	Choi Jin-hee; Park Ji-young	CMG Chorok Stars	
2013	My Cute Guys	이웃집 꽃미남	tvN	Jo Moon-joo	Choi Jin-hee; Park Ji-young	Oh!Boy Project; CJ E&M	
2013	The Virus	더 바이러스	OCN	Choi Young-soo; Lee Jong-jae	Choi Jin-hee; Park Ji-young	JS Pictures	
2013	Nine	나인: 아홉 번의 시간여행	tvN	Lee Sang-hee; Moon Seon-ho; Lim Eun	Choi Jin-hee; Park Ji-young	JS Pictures, Chorokbaem Media	
2013	Crazy Love	미친 사랑	tvN	Lee Min-jin, Jo Na-hyun	Choi Jin-hee; Park Ji-young	JS Pictures	
2013	Dating Agency: Cyrano	연애조작단; 시라노	tvN	Kang Hee-joon; Lee Ye-rim	Choi Jin-hee; Park Ji-young	Oh!Boy Project; CJ E&M	
2013	She is Wow	우와한 녀	tvN	Jo Moon-ju	Choi Jin-hee; Park Ji-young	Urban Works Media	
2013	Special Affairs Team TEN 2	특수사건 전담반 TEN 2	OCN	Kim Mi-sook	Choi Jin-hee; Park Ji-young	MBC C&I	
2014	Emergency Couple	응급남녀	tvN	Yoon Hyun-ki	Choi Jin-hee; Park Ji-young	Content K Co. Ltd.	
2014	Gap-dong	갑동이	tvN	Kang Hee-jun; Lee Young-ok	Choi Jin-hee; Park Ji-young	Pan Entertainment	
2014	Marriage, Not Dating	연애 말고 결혼	tvN		Choi Jin-hee; Park Ji-young	IOK Media	
2014	It's Okay, That's Love	괜찮아, 사랑이야	SBS	Kim Kyu-tae; Choi Jin-hee; Park Ji-young	Kim Young-seop (SBS Drama Division)	GT Entertainment, CJ ENM	
2014	Family Secret	가족의 비밀	tvN	Kim Ji-yeon; Park Eun-kyung	Choi Jin-hee; Park Ji-young	Creative Leaders Group 8	
2014	Cheo Yong	귀신 보는 형사 처용	OCN		Choi Jin-hee; Park Ji-young; Park Sun-jin	CMG Chorok Stars (now Star Road Entertainment); Darin Media	
2014	Forever Young	오늘도 청춘	VTV	Choi Jin-hee		VFC	
2014	Misaeng: Incomplete Life	미생	tvN	Lee Jae-moon; Ham Seung-hoon	Choi Jin-hee; Park Ji-young	Number 3 Pictures	
2015	Heart to Heart	하트 투 하트	tvN		Choi Jin-hee; Park Ji-young	Chorokbaem Media; Story Plant	
2015	Love Weaves Through a Millennium	상애천사천년	Hunan TV	Choi Jin-hee		Hunan TV; EE-Media; CJ E&M	
2015	Hogu's Love	호구의 사랑	tvN	Choi Jin-hee; Park Ji-young; Executive Producer	Choi Jin-hee; Park Ji-young	MI Co., Ltd.	
2015	Super Daddy Yeol	슈퍼대디 열	tvN	Choi Jin-hee; Park Ji-young; Shin Dae-shik; Jang Jung-do; Lee Esther; Ham Seung-hoon	Choi Jin-hee; Park Ji-young	tvN	
2015	A Bird That Doesn't Sing	울지 않는 새	tvN	Seo Yong-il; So Jae-hyun	Choi Jin-hee; Park Ji-young	Story Plant	
2015	Ex-Girlfriends' Club	구여친클럽	tvN	Yoo Hyun-ki; Choi Jin-hee; Park Ji-young	Choi Jin-hee; Park Ji-young	JS Pictures	
2015	Hidden Identity	신분을 숨겨라	tvN	Hwang Joon-hyeok; Jo Eun-sol	Choi Jin-hee; Park Ji-young	Neo Entertainment	
2015	Hello Monster	너를 기억해	KBS2	Choi Jin-hee; Park Ji-young; Jung Sung-hyo; Executive Producer	KBS Drama Departement	CJ E&M	
2015	Oh My Ghost	오 나의 귀신님	tvN	Jo Moon-joo; Lee So-yoon	Choi Jin-hee; Park Ji-young	Chorokbaem Media	
2015	Cheo Yong Season 2	귀신 보는 형사 처용 2	OCN		Choi Jin-hee; Park Ji-young; Park Sun-jin	CMG Chorok Stars (now Star Road Entertainment); Darin Media	
2015	Second 20s	두번째 스무살	tvN	Lee Min-jin; Lee Ye-rim; Choi Jin-hee; Park Ji-young	Choi Jin-hee; Park Ji-young	JS Pictures; Astory	
2015	Bubble Gum	풍선껌	tvN	Jo Moon-ju	Choi Jin-hee; Park Ji-young	Hwa&Dam Pictures	
2016	Cheese in the Trap	치즈인더트랩	tvN	Kim Keo-hong; Jung Se-ryung	Choi Jin-hee; Park Ji-young	Eight Works; Kross Pictures; PGood Media	
2016	Signal	시그널	tvN	Lee Sang-baek	Choi Jin-hee; Park Ji-young	Astory	
2016	Pied Piper	피리부는 사나이	tvN	Kim Sung-min; Pyeong chang-woo; Kim Jin-i	Choi Jin-hee; Park Ji-young	Content K	
2016	Memory	기억	tvN	Yoon Hyun-ki	Choi Jin-hee; Park Ji-young	MI Co., Ltd.	
2016	The Vampire Detective	뱀파이어 탐정	OCN	Lee Seung-hoon	Choi Jin-hee; Park Ji-young	OCN	
2020	Birthcare Center	산후조리원	tvN	Kim Dong-rae	Choi Jin-hee for CJ ENM	tvN; RaemongRaein Co., Ltd.	
2021	Mouse	마우스	tvN	tvN; Choi Jin-hee	Jeong Hoe-seok; Nam Gun-jung; Lee Hyun-young	HIGROUND; Studio Invictus	
2021	Adult Trainee	어른연습생	TVING	Choi Jin-hee; Kim Dong-gu; (Executive Producer)		CJ ENM; DK E&M	

=== Studio Dragon ===
Drama credits
Year	Title		Network	Credited as		Notes	Ref.
Year	English	Korean	Network	Producer	Planner	Notes	Ref.
2016	Another Miss Oh	또! 오해영	tvN	Choi Jin-hee; Yoon Ki-tae	Choi Jin-hee for Studio Dragon	Studio Dragon; Chorokbaem Media	
2016	Dear My Friends	디어 마이 프렌즈	tvN	Bae Jong-byung; Kim Kyu-tae; Choi Jin-hee	Choi Jin-hee for Studio Dragon	Studio Dragon; GT Entertainment	
2016	Squad 38	38사기동대	OCN	Choi Jin-hee; Jeong Chang-hwan; Han Se-min	Choi Jin-hee for Studio Dragon	Studio Dragon; SM C&C; InfinityOne Comics Entertainment Inc.; CJ E&M	
2016	The Good Wife	굿 와이프	tvN	Han So-jin; Lee So-yoon	Choi Jin-hee for Studio Dragon	Studio Dragon	
2016	On the Way to the Airport	공항 가는 길	KBS 2TV	Choi Jin-hee; Park Ji-young	KBS Drama Departement	Studio Dragon	
2016	Woman with a Suitcase	캐리어를 끄는 여자	MBC TV	Choi Jin-hee; Park Ji-young	MBC Drama Departement	Studio Dragon	
2016	Hey Ghost, Let's Fight	싸우자귀신아	tvN	Yoon Hyun-gi; Lee Se-hee	Choi Jin-hee for Studio Dragon	Creative Leaders Group 8; The Unicorn	
2016	Cinderella with Four Knights	신데렐라와 네 명의 기사	tvN	Lee Jung-su; Gwak Geun-su; Kim Mi-ra; Kim Ye-ji	Choi Jin-hee for Studio Dragon	HB Entertainment	
2016	The K2	더 케이투	tvN	Kim Geun-hong; Moon Boo-mi	Choi Jin-hee for Studio Dragon	HB Entertainment	
2016	Shuttle Love Millennium	상애천사천년 2: 달빛 아래의 교환	Hunan TV	Jang-yong; Ryuk Danni	Choi Jin-hee	Hunan Satellite TV; Tianyu Media; Studio Dragon; Mango Film and Television	
2016	Entourage	안투라지	tvN	Choi Jin-hee; Kim Young-kyu; (Executive Producer)	Choi Jin-hee for Studio Dragon	Studio Dragon (Under license from Warner Bros. International Television)	
2016–2017	The Legend of the Blue Sea	푸른 바다의 전설	SBS TV	Kim Sun-jung; Choi Jin-hee; Lee Ji-hyun; (EP)	Park Young-soo (SBS Drama); Developer	Culture Depot	
2016–2017	Guardian: The Lonely and Great God	도깨비	tvN	Joo Kyung-ha; Kim Ji-yeon	Choi Jin-hee for Studio Dragon	Hwa&Dam Pictures	
2017	Voice	보이스	OCN	Kim Ryun-hee	Choi Jin-hee for Studio Dragon	Content K	
2017	Introverted Boss	내성적인 보스	tvN	So Jae-hyeon	Choi Jin-hee for Studio Dragon	KBS Media; Introverted Boss SPC	
2017	Tomorrow, With You	내일 그대와	tvN	Cho Moon-joo	Choi Jin-hee for Studio Dragon	Celltrion Entertainment	
2017	The Liar and His Lover	그녀는 거짓말을 너무 사랑해	tvN	Jung Se-ryung	Choi Jin-hee for Studio Dragon	Bon Factory Worldwide	
2017	Tunnel	터널	OCN	Kim Sung-min; Park Ji-young	Choi Jin-hee for Studio Dragon	The Unicorn	
2017	Chicago Typewriter	시카고타자기	tvN	Kim Ki-jae	Choi Jin-hee for Studio Dragon	The Unicorn	
2017	Circle	써클: 이어진 두 세계	tvN	Choi Jin-hee; Jang Jin-wook	Lee Myung-han for tvN (Creator)	tvN; Studio Dragon	
2017	Duel	듀얼	OCN	Lee Sung-hoon; Yoo Seul-gi	Choi Jin-hee for Studio Dragon	Chorokbaem Media	
2017	Stranger	비밀의 숲	tvN	Choi Jin-hee (EP)	Choi Jin-hee for Studio Dragon	Signal Entertainment Group; IOK Media	
2017	The Bride of Habaek	하백의 신부	tvN		Choi Jin-hee for Studio Dragon	Number Three Pictures	
2017	Criminal Minds	크리미널 마인드	tvN		Choi Jin-hee for Studio Dragon	Taewon Entertainment; ABC Studios (in association with)	
2017	Save Me	구해줘	OCN	Choi Jin-hee (EP)	Choi Jin-hee for Studio Dragon	Hidden Sequence	
2017	Live Up to Your Name	명불허전	tvN	Choi Jin-hee (EP)	Choi Jin-hee for Studio Dragon	Bon Factory Worldwide	
2017	Argon	아르곤	tvN		Choi Jin-hee for Studio Dragon	Daydream Entertainment	
2017	Black	블랙	OCN		Choi Jin-hee for Studio Dragon	iWill Media	
2017	Because This Is My First Life	이번 생은 처음이라	tvN		Choi Jin-hee for Studio Dragon	Studio Dragon; MI Inc.	
2017	Avengers Social Club	부암동 복수자들	tvN		Choi Jin-hee for Studio Dragon	JS Pictures	
2017	Revolutionary Love	변혁의 사랑	tvN		Choi Jin-hee for Studio Dragon	Samhwa Networks	
2017	The Most Beautiful Goodbye	세상에서 가장 아름다운 이별	tvN	Kim Kyu-tae	Choi Jin-hee for Studio Dragon	GTist	
2017–2018	Bad Guys 2	나쁜 녀석들: 악의 도시	OCN	Heo Gun	Choi Jin-hee for Studio Dragon	Urban Works Media	
2017–2018	A Korean Odyssey	화유기	tvN	Choi Jin-hee (EP)	Choi Jin-hee for Studio Dragon	Studio Dragon; JS Pictures	
2017–2018	Drama Stage	드라마 스테이지	tvN	Choi Jin-hee (seasons 1–3)	Choi Jin-hee for Studio Dragon	Studio Dragon	
2018	Mother	마더	tvN		Choi Jin-hee for Studio Dragon	The Unicorn	
2018	Cross	크로스	tvN		Choi Jin-hee for Studio Dragon	Logos Film	
2018	Live	라이브	tvN		Choi Jin-hee for Studio Dragon	GTist	
2018	My Mister	나의 아저씨	tvN	Choi Jin-hee (EP)	Choi Jin-hee for Studio Dragon	Chorokbaem Media	
2018	Mistress	미스트리스	OCN		Choi Jin-hee for Studio Dragon	Chorokbaem Media	
2018	Lawless Lawyer	무법 변호사	tvN		Choi Jin-hee for Studio Dragon	Logos Film	
2018	What's Wrong with Secretary Kim	김비서가 왜 그럴까	tvN	Choi Jin-hee (EP)	Choi Jin-hee for Studio Dragon	Bon Factory Worldwide	
2018	Life on Mars	라이프 온 마스	OCN	Jeong Se-ryeong; Hwang Chang Woo; Cho Hye-rin	Choi Jin-hee for Studio Dragon	Production H	
2018	Mr. Sunshine	미스터 션샤인	tvN		Choi Jin-hee for Studio Dragon	Hwa&Dam Pictures	
2018	Familiar Wife	아는 와이프	tvN		Choi Jin-hee for Studio Dragon	Chorokbaem Media	
2018	Voice 2	보이스 2	OCN	Kim Ryun-hee	Choi Jin-hee for Studio Dragon	Content K	
2018	About Time	백일의 낭군님	tvN		Choi Jin-hee for Studio Dragon	Story TV	
2018	100 Days My Prince	백일의 낭군님	tvN		Choi Jin-hee for Studio Dragon	AStory	
2018	The Guest	손 The Guest	OCN	Choi Jin-hee; Kim Gun-hong	Choi Jin-hee for Studio Dragon	Studio Dragon	
2018	Player	플레이어	OCN		Choi Jin-hee for Studio Dragon	iWill Media	
2018	Room No. 9	나인룸	tvN		Choi Jin-hee for Studio Dragon	Kim Jong-hak Production	
2018	Tale of Fairy	계룡선녀전	tvN		Choi Jin-hee for Studio Dragon	JS Pictures	
2018–2019	Quiz of God: Reboot	신의 퀴즈: 리부트	OCN	Park Ji-hyun	Choi Jin-hee for Studio Dragon	Curo Holdings; Eight Works	
2018–2019	Dear My Room	은주의 방	Olive		Choi Jin-hee for Studio Dragon	Studio 605	
2018–2019	Encounter	남자친구	tvN	Moon Seok-hwan; Oh Kwang-hee	Choi Jin-hee for Studio Dragon	Bon Factory Worldwide	
2018–2019	Priest	프리스트	OCN	Jeon Kyu-ah	Choi Jin-hee for Studio Dragon	Crave Works	
2018–2019	Memories of the Alhambra	알함브라 궁전의 추억	tvN	Park Ho-sik (CP)	Choi Jin-hee for Studio Dragon; Lee Myung-han for tvN (Creator)	Studio Dragon; Chorokbaem Media	
2019	The Crowned Clown	왕이 된 남자	tvN	Kim Gyu-tae	Choi Jin-hee for Studio Dragon	Studio Dragon; GTist	
2019	Romance Is a Bonus Book	로맨스는 별책부록	tvN	Hwang Jee-woo (EP)	Choi Jin-hee for Studio Dragon	Story & Pictures Media	
2019	Touch Your Heart	진심이 닿다	tvN	Jang Jung-do (CP); Lee Jun-ho (EP); Han Suk-won (EP); Jung Da-hyung (Producer)	Choi Jin-hee for Studio Dragon	Mega Monster; HighZium studio	
2019	Possessed	빙의	OCN	Song Jung-woo	Choi Jin-hee for Studio Dragon	Daydream Entertainment	
2019	He Is Psychometric	사이코메트리 그녀석	tvN	Lee Jin-suk (EP)	Choi Jin-hee for Studio Dragon	JS Pictures	
2019	Confession	자백	tvN	Min Hyun-il (EP)	Choi Jin-hee for Studio Dragon	Ace Factory	
2019	Kill It	킬잇	OCN	OCN	Choi Jin-hee for Studio Dragon	Crave Works	
2019	Her Private Life	그녀의 사생활	tvN	—	Choi Jin-hee for Studio Dragon	Bon Factory Worldwide	
2019	Abyss	어비스	tvN	Lee Hyang-bong; Bae Lik-hyeon	Choi Jin-hee for Studio Dragon	Studio Dragon	
2019	Save Me 2	구해줘 2	OCN	Lee Jae-moon	Choi Jin-hee for Studio Dragon	Hidden Sequence	
2019	Voice 3	보이스 3	OCN	Kim Ryun-hee	Choi Jin-hee for Studio Dragon	Content K	
2019	Search: WWW	검색어를 입력하세요: WWW	tvN		Choi Jin-hee for Studio Dragon	Hwa&Dam Pictures	
2019	Designated Survivor: 60 Days	60일, 지정생존자	tvN		Choi Jin-hee for Studio Dragon	DK E&M	
2019	Watcher	왓쳐	OCN	Choi Jin-hee; Kim Young-kyu; (EP)	Choi Jin-hee for Studio Dragon	Studio Dragon	
2019	Hotel Del Luna	호텔 델루나	tvN		Choi Jin-hee for Studio Dragon	Studio Dragon; GTist	
2019	Class of Lies	미스터 기간제	OCN	Park Jeong jun; Lee Jin seok	Choi Jin-hee for Studio Dragon	JS Pictures	
2019	The Great Show	위대한 쇼	Huayi Brothers		Choi Jin-hee for Studio Dragon	Huayi Brothers; Lotte Cultureworks	
2019	The Running Mates: Human Rights	달리는 조사관	OCN	Song Jung-woo	Choi Jin-hee for Studio Dragon	Daydream Entertainment	
2019	Miss Lee	청일전자 미쓰리	tvN	Lee Jang-soo	Choi Jin-hee for Studio Dragon	Logos Film	
2019	Melting Me Softly	날 녹여주오	tvN		Choi Jin-hee for Studio Dragon	Story Phoenix	
2019	The Lies Within	모두의 거짓말	OCN	—	Choi Jin-hee for Studio Dragon	OCN	
2019	Catch the Ghost	유령을 잡아라	tvN	Lee Jang-soo; Choi Tae-young	Choi Jin-hee for Studio Dragon	Logos Film	
2019–2020	Psychopath Diary	싸이코패스 다이어리	tvN	—N/a	Choi Jin-hee for Studio Dragon	KeyEast	
2019–2020	Black Dog: Being A Teacher	블랙독	tvN	—N/a	Choi Jin-hee for Studio Dragon	Urban Works Media	
2019–2020	Crash Landing on You	사랑의 불시착	tvN	Kim Seon-jung; Park Ji-young; Lee Se-hee	Choi Jin-hee for Studio Dragon	Culture Depot	
2020	Money Game	머니게임	tvN	Lee Jin-seok	Choi Jin-hee for Studio Dragon	JS Pictures	
2020	My Holo Love	나 홀로 그대	Netflix	Choi Jin-hee; Lee Hye-young; (EP)	Choi Jin-hee for Studio Dragon	Netflix Services Korea	
2020	The Cursed	방법	tvN	Lee Jung-mook	Choi Jin-hee for Studio Dragon	Lezhin Studio	
2020	Hi Bye, Mama!	하이바이, 마마!	tvN	Lee Seung-hee; Park Ji-hyun; Yoo Sung-min	Choi Jin-hee for Studio Dragon	MI Inc.	
2020	Tell Me What You Saw	본대로 말하라	OCN	Kim Hong-sun (EP)	Choi Jin-hee for Studio Dragon	H House	
2020	A Piece of Your Mind	반의 반	tvN	—	Choi Jin-hee for Studio Dragon	The Unicorn; Movie Rock	
2020	Rugal	루갈	OCN	Noh Ji-yeon	Choi Jin-hee for Studio Dragon	LIAN Entertainment	
2020	The King: Eternal Monarch	더 킹 : 영원의 군주	SBS TV	Choi Jin-hee; Yoon Ha-rim; (EP)	SBS Drama Department	Studio Dragon; Hwa&Dam Pictures	
2020	When My Love Blooms	화양연화 – 삶이 꽃이 되는 순간	tvN	—	Choi Jin-hee for Studio Dragon	Studio Dragon; Bon Factory Worldwide	
2020	Oh My Baby	오 마이 베이비	tvN	—	Choi Jin-hee for Studio Dragon	Studio Dragon; Studio&NEW	
2020	Memorist	메모리스트	tvN	So Jae Hyeon (EP)	Choi Jin-hee for Studio Dragon	Studio 605	
2020	My Unfamiliar Family	(아는 건 별로 없지만) 가족입니다	tvN	—	Choi Jin-hee for Studio Dragon	Studio Dragon	
2020	It's Okay to Not Be Okay	사이코지만 괜찮아	tvN	—	Choi Jin-hee for Studio Dragon	Story TV; Gold Medalist	
2020	Train	트레인	OCN	—	Choi Jin-hee for Studio Dragon	doFRAME	
2020	Sweet Home	스위트홈	Netflix	Choi Jin-hee; Kwon Mi-kyung; Kim Je-hyeon; Yoo Sang-won; Yang Eun-jin	Studio Dragon	Studio N	

== Accolades ==
=== Awards and nominations ===
List of award
Award ceremony	Year	Category	Recipient	Result	Ref.
Media Management Awards (Note: Media Management Award was organized by The Media Future Research Institute.)	2019	CEO Leadership Award	Choi Jin-hee	Won	

=== Listicles ===
Name of publisher, year listed, name of listicle, and placement
Publisher	Year	Listicle	Placement	Ref.
Datanews	2019	Female CEO of a listed company in her 30s	Top 2	
Forbes Korea	2019	65 Powerful Female CEOs	14th	
The K-Brand Index	2026	Female CEO category	8th	
Leader+ (Note: Business People (www.businesspeople.co.kr), a recruitment portal for experienced executives and professionals)	2019	10 Leaders who Lead K-Culture	Top 10	
Hankyung Geeks and Startup Alliance	2022	Korea's 100 Female Startup Leaders	9th (Note: Overall)	
Hankyung Geeks and Startup Alliance	2022	Korea's 100 Female Startup Leaders	1st (Note: Content and Social Category)	
