= It's Okay, That's Love =

2014 South Korean TV series

- Promotional poster
- Also known as: It's Okay, It's Love; It's Alright, This Is Love
- Genre: Romance; Melodrama; Medical
- Written by: Noh Hee-kyung
- Directed by: Kim Kyu-tae
- Starring: Zo In-sung; Gong Hyo-jin; Sung Dong-il; Lee Kwang-soo; Do Kyung-soo
- Country of origin: South Korea
- Original language: Korean
- No. of episodes: 16

Production
- Executive producer: Kim Young-sub
- Producers: Kim Kyu-tae; Choi Jin-hee; Park Ji-young
- Production locations: South Korea; Japan
- Production companies: GT Entertainment; CJ E&M

Original release
- Network: SBS TV
- Release: July 23 – September 10, 2014

It's Okay, That's Love (Korean: 괜찮아, 사랑이야; RR: Gwaenchana, sarangiya) is a 2014 South Korean television series starring Zo In-sung, Gong Hyo-jin, Sung Dong-il, Lee Kwang-soo, and Doh Kyung-soo. It aired on SBS from July 23 to September 11, 2014, on Wednesdays and Thursdays at 21:55 (KST) for 16 episodes.

== Synopsis ==
Jang Jae-yeol is an author of bestselling mystery novels and a radio DJ. Playful and a bit arrogant, he also has obsessive–compulsive disorder. Jang Jae-yeol was assaulted by his father when he was young and his mother accidentally killed his father, but he falsely testified that his brother killed his father. That guilt leads him to develop obsessive-compulsive disorder. Ji Hae-soo is a psychiatrist on her first year of fellowship. Driven and ambitious with her career yet compassionate towards her patients, Hae-soo has a negative attitude towards love and relationships in her personal life. Once Jae-yeol and Hae-soo meet, there is much contention between them caused by their strong personalities and refusal to give in to each other. However, their bickering slowly turns into love and they begin to learn how compatible they are. Jae-yeol and Hae-soo attempt to heal each other's deep-seated wounds, but their fledgling relationship takes a blow when they learn that Jae-yeol's mental health issues are more serious than they initially suspected.

== Cast ==
=== Main ===
- Zo In-sung as Jang Jae-yeol
  - Sung Yoo-bin as young Jang Jae-yeol

A bestselling mystery fiction novelist and radio DJ. Because of his troubled past and obsessive–compulsive disorder, Jae-yeol can only sleep in his own bathtub. From his first meeting with psychiatrist Ji Hae-soo on a talk show, they have had a combative relationship. When noise from ongoing construction beside his house interrupts his writing, and he learns that Hae-soo is currently a tenant living in a building he owns in Hongdae, Jae-yeol temporarily moves in with her and her housemates because of his fascination with her. As the two fall in love, they must later come to grips with Jae-yeol's undiagnosed schizophrenia.

- Gong Hyo-jin as Ji Hae-soo
  - Kang Joo-eun as young Ji Hae-soo

A first-year fellow in the psychiatry department at a university hospital. A smart and compassionate doctor but not very affectionate. Hae-soo self-diagnoses herself as having insecurity/anxiety issues, a fear of commitment and sex phobia due to an incident where she saw her mom cheating on her dad with another guy.

- Sung Dong-il as Jo Dong-min

Hae-soo's senior colleague at the hospital and housemate, who also happens to be her first love. His wife and children are based in the United States, and he has an amicable relationship with his ex-wife and colleague, Young-jin. After he becomes the court-appointed psychiatrist to a convict, Jang Jae-beom, whom he later finds out is Jae-yeol's brother, Dong-min sets out to find the truth behind the crime.

- Lee Kwang-soo as Park Soo-kwang

A cafe waiter with Tourette syndrome, and housemate of Hae-soo and Dong-min. He is particularly close friends with Dong-min, who often calms him down during his panic attacks. Soo-kwang is unlucky in love and keeps getting dumped by girls, but the one he can't quite get over is So-nyeo, who is not only a minor but has several boyfriends at the same time.

=== Supporting ===
- Doh Kyung-soo as Han Kang-woo

A high school student who's a big fan of Jae-yeol, and aspires to become a famous author like him. Kang-woo constantly bugs Jae-yeol to read his manuscripts, and follows him around. He and his mother are frequently beaten by his alcoholic father. Kang-woo is later revealed to be more than just a fan to Jae-yeol. Jae-yeol first saw Kang-woo three years ago, ever since Jae-beom stabbed him.

- Jin Kyung as Lee Young-jin

A psychiatrist and Hae-soo's immediate boss at the hospital. Young-jin still has unresolved feelings towards her ex-husband Dong-min, since the breakdown of their marriage was partially caused by her decision to focus on her career and not have children.

- Yang Ik-june as Jang Jae-beom
  - Noh Tae-yub as young Jang Jae-beom

Jae-yeol's older brother who served eleven years in prison after being found guilty of killing their abusive stepfather. His defense attorney at the time found the verdict and sentence needlessly harsh, which came about due to a tough-on-juveniles judge and an ambitious prosecutor. Jae-beom has maintained his innocence through the years, but after being released, he repeatedly stabs his brother, and gets sentenced to another 30 months in jail. Violent and unstable, Jae-beom can't wait to get out of prison and get his revenge on Jae-yeol, whom he believes is the real murderer.

- Lee Sung-kyung as Oh So-nyeo

A troubled girl with behavioral problems who was expelled from high school and was also abandoned by her mother. So-nyeo works at a cafe alongside Soo-kwang; she takes advantage of his feelings for her and uses him to give her money and buy her things, even though he knows she's seeing someone else. So-nyeo eventually falls for Soo-kwang and begins dating him exclusively, then decides she wants to become a psychiatrist like Hae-soo.

- Jang Ki-yong as Sam

So-nyeo's boyfriend.

- Cha Hwa-yeon as Ok-ja

Jae-yeol and Jae-beom's mother. She and Jae-yeol have a close, affectionate relationship. Her older son Jae-beom believes that Ok-ja gave false testimony against him at his trial in order to save Jae-yeol. But as Dong-min later learns from Jae-beom's defense attorney, Ok-ja was the true culprit, setting fire to her unconscious husband after one of her sons non-fatally stabbed him (the man's cause of death was asphyxia). The psychologist who examined her at the time diagnosed Ok-ja as suffering from dissociative disorder, a defense mechanism which made her forget what happened and what she'd done.

- Tae Hang-ho as Yang Tae-yong

Jae-yeol's best friend from childhood and an employee at his publishing house. Tae-yong betrays Jae-yeol by giving Pul-ip a galley proof of his latest book, but Jae-yeol forgives him.

- Kim Mi-kyung as Hae-soo's mother

She takes good care of her severely-handicapped husband, but is also having a decades-long affair with another man, Mr. Kim. Hae-soo's aversion to physical intimacy stems from her knowledge of her mother's affair.

- Do Sang-woo as Choi Ho

The director (PD) of a TV talk show, and Hae-soo's boyfriend of almost a year. They break up when she learns that he's been unfaithful to her.

- Choi Moon-kyung as Ji Yoon-soo
  - Lee Chae-eun as young Ji Yoon-soo

Hae-soo's older sister and Soo-kwang's coworker at the cafe.

- Choi Seung-kyung as Oh Do-deuk, Yoon-soo's husband.
- Han Jung-hyun as Editor Bae, Jae-yeol's book editor.
- Myung Jong-hwan as Resident, Hae-soo's colleague.
- Lee Seo-joon as Resident, Hae-soo's colleague.

=== Special appearances ===
- Yoon Jin-yi as Lee Pool-ip (Ep. 1–2)

A magazine journalist who goes after an interview with Jae-yeol because she's a fan of his work, and ends up becoming his girlfriend for three years. Pool-ip later steals his latest book and passes it off as her own, then publicly accuses Jae-yeol of plagiarism.

- Moon Ji-in as Min-young

Choi Ho's colleague at the TV station and the girl he's been cheating on Hae-soo with.

- Lee El as Se-ra

A transgender woman who was beaten to near-death by her family.

- N/A as Soo-bin, a patient with severe depression.
- Baek Seung-do as Hwan-hee, a patient who draws erotic art.
- Lee Dong-ha as Yoon-chul, a boy band singer and Hae-soo's close friend.
- Jeong Ji-yun as Hye-jin, Yoon-chul's wife who has schizophrenia.
- Ha Yeon-joo as Hyun-joo, Jae-yeol's crush in the past.
- Kim Myung-joong as Hae-soo's father.
- Kim Hwan as Talk show host (Ep. 1)
- N/A as Dong-min's woman on bed (Ep. 1)
- Heo Ji-woong as Radio DJ (Ep. 16)
- Goo Hara as Female fan (Ep. 16)

== Production ==
Screenwriter Noh Hee-kyung and director Kim Kyu-tae said that by realistically exploring characters from a romantic comedy standpoint, their drama also aimed to address the discrimination and social stigma attached to people with mental health issues and other minorities. This was Noh and Kim's fourth collaboration; actor Zo In-sung had previously worked with them on That Winter, the Wind Blows (2013), while actress Gong Hyo-jin had starred in Noh's Wonderful Days (2001).

The first read-through was held in April 2014 at an SBS studio in Ilsan, and filming began shortly after.

At 1:00 a.m. on June 19, 2014, the van Gong Hyo-jin was riding became involved in a three-vehicle rear-end collision with two trucks; she was on her way back to Seoul after filming in Yongin, Gyeonggi Province. This resulted in a left arm fracture, a knee injury, and scratches on Gong's face. After recuperating, she and co-star Jo In-sung later left for a shoot in Okinawa, Japan where their characters go on a romantic trip. Gong's fractured arm was incorporated into the story.

== Original soundtrack ==
Volume 1:
No.	Title	Artist	Length
1.	"최고의 행운" (The Best Luck)	Chen (EXO)	3:45
2.	"괜찮아, 사랑이야" (It's Okay, That's Love)	Davichi	4:04
3.	"잠 못드는 밤" (Sleepless Night)	Crush feat. Punch	3:57
4.	"For You"	Wheesung	3:46
5.	"I Feel You"	Hong Dae-kwang	3:55
6.	"Love Fiction"	Ulala Session	3:38
7.	"Love"	Park Joon-soo and 88 feat. Chen Meihan	1:44
8.	"Slow Romance"	Ahn Joong-jae	2:49
9.	"Get Over"	Kim Ji-soo	2:34
10.	"I Love Party"	Bae Bo-ram	1:39
11.	"Pizz Bizz 44"	Choi Sung-kwon	1:36
12.	"Green Grass"	Jung Yong-gook and Choi Jae-woo	3:26
13.	"OK Love Wawoo"	Bae Bo-ram	1:59
14.	"Harmonica of Retaliation"	Kim Ji-soo	2:40
15.	"Pizz Bizz 34"	Choi Sung-kwon	1:50
16.	"U So Beauty"	Park Joon-soo and 88	2:01
17.	"Balkans"	Choi Sung-kwon	1:58

Volume 2:
No.	Title	Artist	Length
1.	"너를 사랑해" (I Love You)	Yoon Mi-rae	4:03
2.	"U"	MC the Max	4:12
3.	"Tonight"	Orange Caramel	3:08
4.	"And I Need You Most"	Hey	2:48
5.	"I Love Party (Vox ver.)"	Various Artists	1:40
6.	"Blue Day"	Various Artists	2:12
7.	"Let the Wind Blow"	Various Artists	2:54
8.	"Truth"	Various Artists	1:58
9.	"One Moment"	Various Artists	2:11
10.	"Route 16"	Various Artists	3:02
11.	"Irritation"	Various Artists	0:58
12.	"Slow Motion"	Various Artists	2:34
13.	"Schizo"	Various Artists	1:34
14.	"Just Quit It"	Various Artists	1:36
15.	"Seriousness"	Various Artists	1:51
16.	"I'm Yours"	Various Artists	1:22
17.	"Gloomy Dream"	Various Artists	2:03
18.	"Bad Dream"	Various Artists	0:48
19.	"Timeless Slow"	Various Artists	1:28

Pop OST
No.	Title	Artist	Length
1.	"Sunboat"	Little Suns	7:42
2.	"Cross My Mind"	Twin Forks	3:34
3.	"Ship and the Globe"	Kae Sun	3:18
4.	"You're My Best Friend"	The Once	3:08
5.	"Soul"	Brandon Pacheco	3:15
6.	"Heavy"	The Killin' Time Band	4:01
7.	"Hello (Ira ver.) (Radio Edit)"	Quentin Mosimann	3:31
8.	"Psyke Underground (Radio Edit)"	Quentin Mosimann feat. Amanda Wilson	3:09
9.	"Hero"	Family of the Year	3:10
10.	"Sunboat (Radio Edit)"	Little Suns	6:34
11.	"Offbeat"	Clara C.	3:12
12.	"The Camel Song"	Clara C.	2:43
13.	"Just Where I Belong"	Emilie Mover	6:52
14.	"Above the Ground"	Mark Berube	3:16

Chart Performance

Artist	Title	Peak positions	Sales	Album
Artist	Title	Gaon Download Chart	Sales	Album
Chen	"The Best Luck" (최고의 행운)	8	683,264+	It's Okay, That's Love OST
Davichi	"It's Okay, That's Love" (괜찮아 사랑이야)	4	807,620+	It's Okay, That's Love OST
Crush feat. Punch	"Sleepless Night" (잠 못드는 밤)	2	608,669+	It's Okay, That's Love OST
Wheesung	"For You"	22	135,110+	It's Okay, That's Love OST
Hong Dae-kwang	"I Feel You"	23	184,989+	It's Okay, That's Love OST
Ulala Session	"Love Fiction"	11	320,988+	It's Okay, That's Love OST
Yoon Mi-rae	"I Love You" (너를 사랑해)	1	948,536+	It's Okay, That's Love OST
MC the Max	"U"	14	160,527+	It's Okay, That's Love OST
Orange Caramel	"Tonight"	65	21,945+	It's Okay, That's Love OST

== Reception ==
Despite boasting modest ratings, It's Okay, That's Love ranked third on the year-end Content Power Index. CPI, developed by CJ E&M and AGB Nielsen Media Research, monitors non-traditional variables such as number of mobile and Internet streaming viewers and online "buzz" in social media. It also received praise for addressing the discrimination and social stigma attached to people with mental health issues and other minorities.

== Ratings ==
In the table below, the blue numbers represent the lowest ratings and the red numbers represent the highest ratings.

Episode #	Original broadcast date	Average audience share			
Episode #	Original broadcast date	AGB Nielsen		TNmS Ratings	
Episode #	Original broadcast date	Nationwide	Seoul National Capital Area	Nationwide	Seoul National Capital Area
1	July 23, 2014	9.3%	11.0%	9.8%	13.5%
2	July 24, 2014	9.1%	10.3%	11.2%	13.6%
3	July 30, 2014	9.1%	9.6%	9.4%	11.6%
4	July 31, 2014	10.1%	11.2%	10.5%	12.4%
5	August 6, 2014	10.1%	11.5%	9.8%	12.1%
6	August 7, 2014	10.0%	10.8%	9.8%	11.6%
7	August 13, 2014	9.8%	11.0%	11.0%	13.4%
8	August 14, 2014	10.2%	10.9%	10.0%	11.6%
9	August 20, 2014	9.7%	10.8%	9.7%	11.8%
10	August 21, 2014	10.0%	11.2%	11.2%	13.8%
11	August 27, 2014	9.1%	10.2%	9.4%	11.5%
12	August 28, 2014	9.7%	10.5%	10.6%	12.3%
13	September 3, 2014	9.5%	10.7%	9.3%	11.4%
14	September 4, 2014	9.4%	9.7%	10.9%	12.4%
15	September 10, 2014	11.4%	12.1%	11.1%	13.1%
16	September 11, 2014	12.9%	13.8%	13.4%	15.2%
Average		9.9%	10.9%	10.4%	12.6%

== Awards and nominations ==
Year	Award	Category	Recipient	Result
2014	16th Seoul International Youth Film Festival	Best Young Actor	Doh Kyung-soo	Won
2014	16th Seoul International Youth Film Festival	Best OST by a Male Artist	The Best Luck – Chen	Won
2014	7th Korea Drama Awards	Excellence Award, Actor	Lee Kwang-soo	Won
2014	Korean Society for Schizophrenia Research	Plaque of Appreciation	It's Okay, That's Love	Won
2014	6th MelOn Music Awards	Best OST	It's Okay, That's Love – Davichi	Nominated
2014	3rd APAN Star Awards	Daesang (Grand Prize)	Zo In-sung	Won
2014	3rd APAN Star Awards	Top Excellence Award, Actor in a Miniseries	Zo In-sung	Nominated
2014	3rd APAN Star Awards	Top Excellence Award, Actress in a Miniseries	Gong Hyo-jin	Nominated
2014	3rd APAN Star Awards	Best New Actor	Doh Kyung-soo	Won
2014	3rd APAN Star Awards	Popular Star Award, Actor	Lee Kwang-soo	Won
2014	3rd APAN Star Awards	Best OST	It's Okay, That's Love – Davichi	Nominated
2014	22nd Korea Culture and Entertainment Awards	Top Excellence Award, Actress in a Drama	Gong Hyo-jin	Won
2014	16th Mnet Asian Music Awards	Best OST	It's Okay, That's Love – Davichi	Nominated
2014	16th Mnet Asian Music Awards	Best OST	I Love You – Yoon Mi-rae	Nominated
2014	Blue Media Awards	Special Award	It's Okay, That's Love	Won
2014	SBS Drama Awards	Top Excellence Award, Actor in a Miniseries	Zo In-sung	Nominated
2014	SBS Drama Awards	Top Excellence Award, Actress in a Miniseries	Gong Hyo-jin	Won
2014	SBS Drama Awards	Excellence Award, Actor in a Miniseries	Sung Dong-il	Won
2014	SBS Drama Awards	Special Award, Actor in a Miniseries	Lee Kwang-soo	Won
2014	SBS Drama Awards	Special Award, Actress in a Miniseries	Jin Kyung	Won
2014	SBS Drama Awards	Special Award, Actress in a Miniseries	Cha Hwa-yeon	Nominated
2014	SBS Drama Awards	Top 10 Stars	Zo In-sung	Won
2014	SBS Drama Awards	Netizen Popularity Award	Zo In-sung	Nominated
2014	SBS Drama Awards	Netizen Popularity Award	Gong Hyo-jin	Nominated
2014	SBS Drama Awards	Best Couple Award	Zo In-sung and Gong Hyo-jin	Won
2015	51st Baeksang Arts Awards	Best Actor (TV)	Zo In-sung	Nominated
2015	51st Baeksang Arts Awards	Best New Actor (TV)	Doh Kyung-soo	Nominated
2015	51st Baeksang Arts Awards	Best Screenplay (TV)	Noh Hee-kyung	Nominated
2016	3rd Asia Rainbow TV Awards	Best Inspirational Drama	It's Okay, That's Love	Won

== Controversy ==
When the 30-second teaser trailer for the drama was released online on June 25, 2014, netizens pointed out that it had been plagiarized from the short film Olive Juice by New York-based video artist Celia Rowlson-Hall. On June 26, production company GT Entertainment admitted the charge and apologized through a press release, after which the teaser trailer was deleted from the official website.
