= Gummy (singer) =

South Korean singer (born 1981)

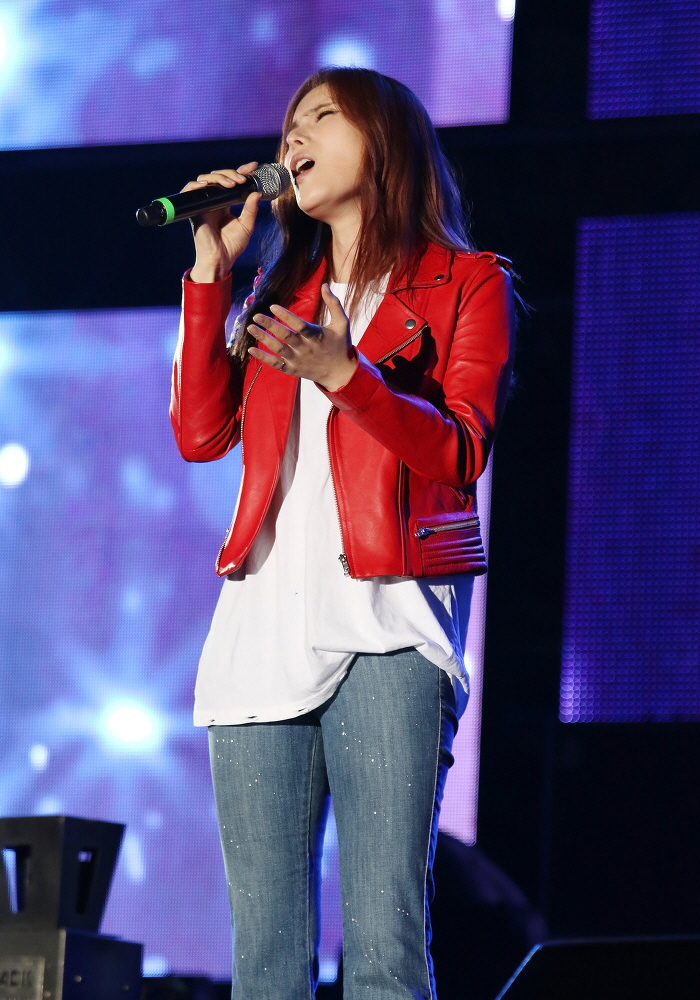
- Gummy in 2016
- Born: April 8, 1981 (age 45); Wando County, South Jeolla Province, South Korea
- Occupation: Singer
- Years active: 2003–present
- Spouse: Jo Jung-suk (m. 2018)
- Children: 2
- Musical career
- Genres: R&B; soul
- Labels: YG; C-JeS; Amoeba Culture

Korean name
- Hangul: 박지연
- Hanja: 朴智妍
- RR: Bak Jiyeon
- MR: Pak Chiyŏn

Stage name
- Hangul: 거미
- RR: Geomi
- MR: Kŏmi

Park Ji-yeon (Korean: 박지연; born April 8, 1981), known professionally as Gummy (거미), is a South Korean singer. She debuted in 2003 with the album Like Them and has since become known for her soundtrack appearances.

== Career ==
=== 2003–2009: Debut and breakthrough success ===
Gummy debuted in 2003 with the album Like Them. Her title track "Memory Loss" (기억상실) brought her success and recognition and led Gummy to win the Bonsang at the 19th Golden Disk Awards. The same year, Gummy earned the Mobile Popularity Award for "Memory Loss" at the 2004 Mnet Km Music Festival. However, she suffered vocal nodules between the first and second albums.

She released her fourth album titled Comfort on March 12, 2008, which marked her first released in three years. The lead single "I'm Sorry" (미안해요) features T.O.P from Big Bang. A week after its release, the song peaked within the top five spots on various digital charts.

=== 2010–2011: Loveless ===
Gummy released a mini album titled Loveless. A music video plus the full song of one of her tracks in the mini album was released on April 21. Loveless was released on April 29, and promotion for the album began in May.

On October 15, 2011, the MV for her remake of "I'm Sorry" feat. TOP was released.

=== 2013: 10th anniversary and label change ===
2013 marked the tenth anniversary for Gummy and she celebrated with a fan meeting. She then released her OST for the drama, That Winter, the Wind Blows entitled "Snow Flower".

Gummy also released her second Japanese album, Fate(s). She also had a duet with Daesung from BIGBANG. Two music videos were released for the lead single of the album, "Shinjiteru (Believe)".

Gummy signed with C-JeS Entertainment in October 2013, leaving YG Entertainment.

=== 2014–present: Original soundtrack releases ===
In 2014, Gummy provided the song "You're Calling Me" for the action-thriller television series Three Days. Gummy then returned with the mini album "I Loved...Have No Regrets". One of the singles from the 6-track EP was a duet with labelmate and JYJ's Park Yuchun.

In 2016, Gummy released her OST for the drama Descendants of the Sun entitled "You are My Everything". It topped iTunes K-pop charts in Canada, Hong Kong, New Zealand, Malaysia, Singapore, Australia, Indonesia, and Taiwan as well as coming in the top 10 in the U.S and Vietnam. The same year, she once again collaborated with Descendant's music director Gaemi to release the OST for the popular drama Love in the Moonlight entitled "Moonlight Drawn by Clouds". The success of her soundtrack releases drew the media to call her "OST Queen".

In October 2021, Gummy released a ballad titled "It Was Still Love".

In June 2024, Gummy signed with new label Amoeba Culture.

== Personal life ==
Gummy was born into a food-production family. Her father worked in a seaweed sauce factory, while her grandfather worked in a prawn farm in the sea.

Gummy has been in a relationship with actor Jo Jung-suk since 2013. In June 2018, Jo announced the couple's engagement and plans to get married in the fall. On October 8, 2018, Gummy's agency announced that the couple had already gotten married in a private ceremony with their families. On August 6, 2020, they welcomed their first child, a daughter. On January 14, 2026, the couple welcomed their second daughter.

== Discography ==
=== Studio albums ===
Title	Album details	Peak chart positions		Sales
Title	Album details	KOR RIAK	KOR Gaon	Sales
Like Them	Released: February 3, 2003; Label: YG Entertainment; Formats: CD, cassette	28	—	KOR: 74,670
It's Different	Released: September 9, 2004; Label: YG Entertainment; Formats: CD, cassette	4	—	KOR: 131,660
For the Bloom	Released: September 1, 2005; Label: YG Entertainment; Formats: CD, cassette	6	—	KOR: 74,960
Gummy Unplugged	Remake album; Released: April 28, 2006; Label: YG Entertainment; Formats: CD, cassette	7	—	KOR: 31,458
Comfort	Released: March 12, 2008; Label: YG Entertainment; Formats: CD, digital download	—	83	
Fall in Memory	Cover album; Released: April 17, 2015; Label: C-Jes Entertainment; Formats: CD, digital download	—N/a	16	KOR: 814
Stroke	Released: June 5, 2017; Label: C-JeS Entertainment; Formats: CD, digital download	—N/a	23	KOR: 1,078
"—" denotes releases that did not chart.

=== Extended plays ===
Title	Album details	Peak chart positions		Sales
Title	Album details	KOR	JPN	Sales
Korean
Loveless	Released: April 30, 2010; Label: YG Entertainment; Formats: CD, digital download	3	—	
I Loved..Have No Regrets (사랑했으니..됐어)	Released: June 10, 2014; Label: C-Jes Entertainment; Formats: CD, digital download	8	—	KOR: 2,728
Japanese
Loveless	Released: November 9, 2011; Label: YG Entertainment; Formats: CD, digital download	—	59	
Fate(s)	Released: April 3, 2013; Label: YG Entertainment; Formats: CD, digital download	—	58	
"—" denotes releases that did not chart.

=== Singles ===
Title	Year	Peak chart positions	Sales	Album
Title	Year	KOR	Sales	Album
"We Should've Been Friends" (친구라도 될 걸 그랬어)	2003	28	KOR: 1,009,278	Like Them
"If You Come Back" (그대 돌아오면)	2003	—	—N/a	Like Them
"Please Forget Me" (날 그만 잊어요)	2004	—	—N/a	It's Different
"Amnesia" (기억상실)	2004	—	—N/a	It's Different
"Childish Adult" (어른아이)	2005	—	—N/a	For the Bloom
"No" (아니)	2005	—	—N/a	For the Bloom
"I'm Sorry" (미안해요) (feat. T.O.P)	2008	—	—N/a	Comfort
"Looking in the Mirror" (거울을 보다가) (feat. Red Roc)	2008	—	—N/a	Comfort
"This Is No Love" (사랑은 없다)	2010	3	KOR: 1,242,662	Loveless
"Because You're a Man" (남자라서)	2010	4	KOR: 1,679,056	Loveless
"Around the Alley" (골목을 돌면) (with Jin Bora)	2010	63	—N/a	Non-album singles
"Love Recipe" (러브 레시피) (with Bobby Kim)	2010	8	—N/a	Non-album singles
"Love Recipe II - People These Days" (with Bobby Kim)	2012	22	KOR: 531,318	Non-album singles
"Only One" (with Big Brother)	2013	64	—N/a	Non-album singles
"Special Love" (with Wheesung)	2013	3	KOR: 539,980	Non-album singles
"You Will Think of Me" (내 생각 날거야)	2014	7	—N/a	Non-album singles
"I Loved..Have No Regrets" (사랑했으니..됐어)	2014	5	—N/a	I Loved..Have No Regrets
"Get Lost" (갈 곳이 없어)	2014	30	—N/a	Non-album single
"The Only Thing I Can't Do" (해줄 수 없는 일)	2015	14	KOR: 264,514	Fall in Memory
"No Reply" (지워지지 않는) (with Jubi of Sunny Hill)	2015	62	—N/a	Non-album singles
"Without You" (with Jung Key, Sisqo)	2015	85	—N/a	Non-album singles
"A Knowing" (남자의 정석) (feat. Boi B)	2017	82	—N/a	Stroke
"I I YO"	2017	34	—N/a	Stroke
"Alone" (혼자)	2019	26	—N/a	Non-album single
"Raise Your Voice" (with Kim Jong-kook, Haha and Gummy)	2019	—	—N/a	Running Man Fan Meeting: Project Running 9
"Autumn Breeze"	2021	—	—N/a	Autumn Breeze
"Regret" (그래도 사랑이었잖아)	2021	76	—N/a	Non-album singles
"A Song for You" (그댈 위한 노래)	2023	153	—N/a	Non-album singles
"Decision to Leave" (헤어질 결심)	2023	104	—N/a	Non-album singles
"If You're Gonna Be Like This" (이럴거면)	2023	132	—N/a	Non-album singles
"—" denotes releases that did not chart.

=== Soundtrack appearances ===
Title	Year	Peak chart positions	Sales	Album
Title	Year	KOR	Sales	Album
"Tears in Me"	2001	—		Sun-hee and Jin-hee OST
"What Can I Say"	2004	—		New Human Market OST
"Still"	2004	—		New Human Market OST
"Please Forget Me" (날그만잊어요)	2004	—		A Moment to Remember OST
"Fairy Tale" (동화)	2004	—		A Moment to Remember OST
"Pain" (통증)	2007	—		H.I.T OST
"My Dear is Faraway" (님은 먼 곳에)	2008	—		Sunny OST
"Compassion" (애심)	2008	—		The Scale of Providence OST
"The Road to Me" (내게로 오는 길)	2008	—		General Hospital 2 OST
"Farewell Follows Love" (이별은 사랑 뒤를 따라와)	2009	—		Triangle OST
"Because It's You" (그대라서)	2009	3	KOR: 1,294,639	Will It Snow for Christmas? OST
"I Love You Even If I Die" (죽어도 사랑해)	2010	5	KOR: 1,772,029	Big Thing OST
"I Want to Wait" (기다리고 싶어)	2011	12	KOR: 795,207	Midas OST
"Snowflake" (눈꽃)	2013	3	KOR: 1,128,727	That Winter, the Wind Blows OST
"Day and Night" (낮과 밤)	2013	8	KOR: 661,065	Master's Sun OST
"You're Calling Me" (날 부르네요)	2014	20		Three Days OST
"Get Lost (For Spy)" (갈 곳이 없어)	2015	—		Spy OST
"You Are My Everything"	2016	1	KOR: 1,600,720	Descendants of the Sun OST
"Moonlight Drawn by Clouds" (구르미 그린 달빛)	2016	2	KOR: 795,966	Love in the Moonlight OST
"Because I Love You"	2017	—		My Sassy Girl OST
"Angel"	2017	80		The Most Beautiful Goodbye OST
"Fade Away" (지워져)	2018	98		100 Days My Prince OST
"Remember Me" (기억해줘요 내 모든 날과 그때를)	2019	1		Hotel Del Luna OST
"The Most Perfect Days" (가장 완벽한 날들)	2019	39		The Tale of Nokdu OST
"Your Day" (너의 하루는 좀 어때)	2020	50		Dr. Romantic 2 OST
"My Love"	2020	—		The King: Eternal Monarch OST
"Love Song" (노래해요 그대 듣도록)	2020	154		Do You Like Brahms? OST
"I Wanna Be With You"	2021	120		Doom at Your Service OST
"Raindrop" (빗방울)	2022	175		Alchemy of Souls OST
"—" denotes releases that did not chart.

=== Other charted songs ===
Title	Year	Peak chart positions	Sales	Album
Title	Year	KOR	Sales	Album
"What Can I Do" (어떡해)	2010	39		Loveless
"Who Are You" (누구세요) (feat. Bigtone)	2010	96		Loveless
"Let's Break Up" (그만 헤어져)	2010	69		Loveless
"Because of You"	2010	23	KOR: 1,116,062	Loveless
"I Am Happy" (난 행복해)	2011	14	KOR: 692,718	I Am a Singer 경연 11-1
"Again" (또)	2011	70		I Am a Singer 경연 11-2
"Like Rain and Music" (비처럼 음악처럼)	2011	56		I Am a Singer 경연 12-1
"Punk Kid" (개구쟁이) (feat. T.O.P)	2011	15		I Am a Singer 경연 12-2
"Don't Leave Me" (날 떠나지마)	2011	47		I Am a Singer 경연 13-1
"P.S. I Love You"	2012	30		I Am a Singer 경연 13-2
"One of My People Go" (내 하나의 사람은 가고)	2012	71		I Am a Singer 경연 14-1
"I Have a Lover" (애인... 있어요)	2012	44		I Am a Singer 경연 14-2
"Forever Friend" (영원한 친구)	2012	70		I Am a Singer 경연 15-1
"You in My Faded Memories" (흐린 기억속의 그대)	2012	73		I Am a Singer 경연 15-2
"In The Name of Love" (사랑이라는 이유로) (with Kim Junsu)	2013	53		Musical December 2013 with Kim Junsu
"Let's Play" (놀러가자) (feat. Park Yoo-chun)	2014	25		I Loved..Have No Regrets
"Would You Love Me" (사랑해주세요)	2014	92		I Loved..Have No Regrets
"Lying" (누워) (feat. Loco)	2014	77		I Loved..Have No Regrets
"Falling Star" (별이 진다네) (with Hwanhee)	2014	61		Immortal Songs: Singing the Legend: Summer Special Part 1
"In Dreams" (꿈에)	2015	91		King of Mask Singer Episode 34
"Can't Have You" (가질 수 없는 너)	2015	27		Two Yoo Project Sugar Man Part 7
"Jealousy" (질투나) (with Ailee)	2018	70		The Call Project No. 3

== Filmography ==
=== Television shows ===
Year	Title	! Notes
2015	King of Mask Singer	Young and Innocent Cosmos (Episodes 25–26, 28, 30, 32)
2021	The Song We Loved, New Singer	Judge
2022	Singforest	Cast
2022	New Festa	Cast Member

== Awards and nominations ==
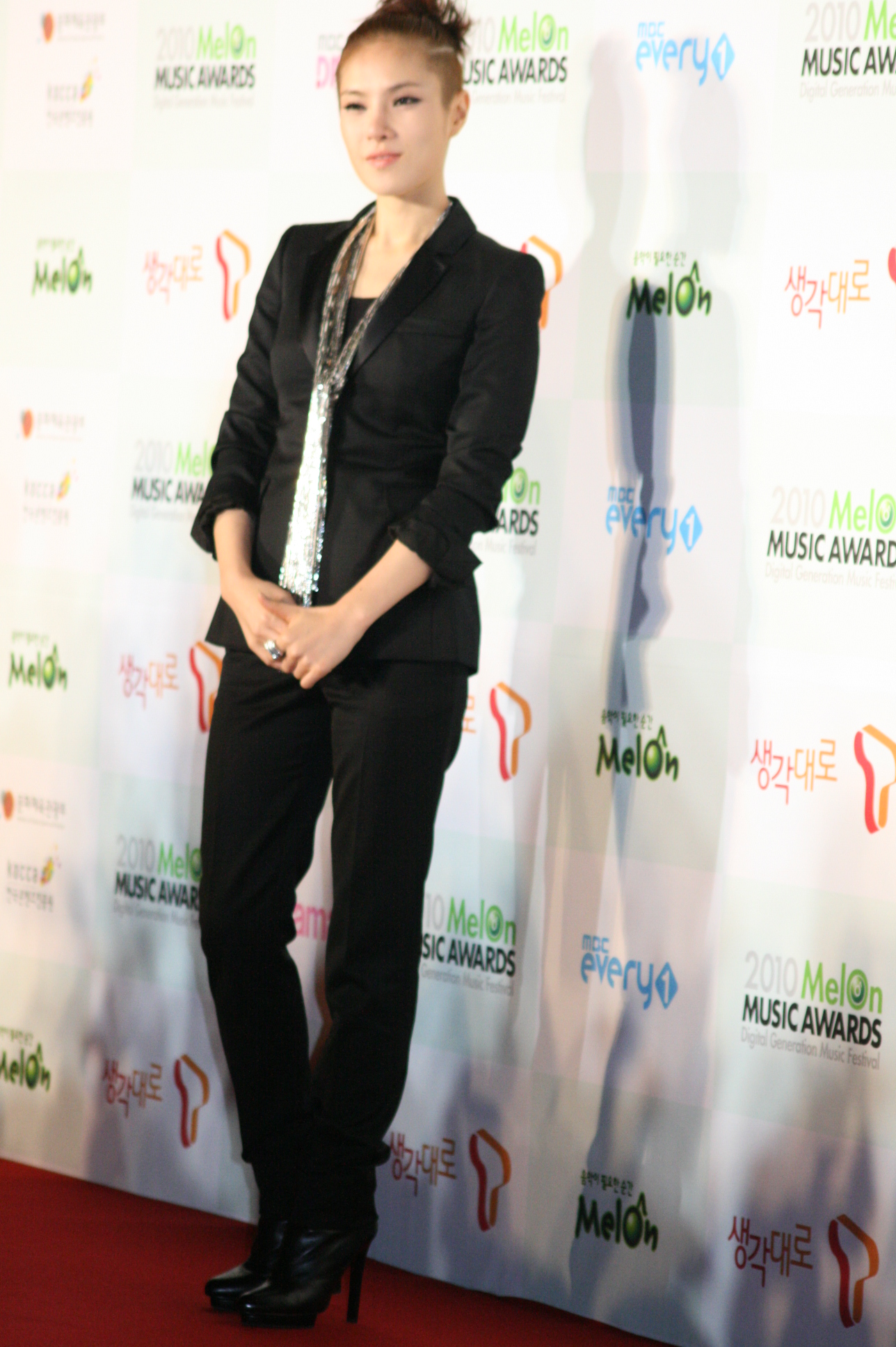
In 2010

=== Golden Disc Awards ===
Year	Category	Nominated work	Result	Ref
2004	Main Prize (Bonsang)	"Amnesia"	Won	
2017	Soundtrack Award	"You Are My Everything"	Won	
2020	Soundtrack Award	"Remember Me"	Won	

=== Mnet Asian Music Awards ===
Year	Category	Nominated work	Result	Ref
2004	Mobile Popularity Award	"Amnesia"	Won	
2004	Best Female Artist	"Amnesia"	Nominated	
2004	Best R&B Performance	"Amnesia"	Nominated	
2005	Best R&B Performance	"No"	Nominated	
2008	Best Female Artist	"I'm Sorry" (feat. T.O.P)	Nominated	
2010	Best Vocal Performance	"Because You're A Man"	Won	
2010	Best Female Artist	"Because You're A Man"	Nominated	
2016	Best OST	"Moonlight Drawn by Clouds" (OST Love in the Moonlight)	Nominated	
2019	Best OST	"Remember Me" (OST Hotel del Luna)	Won	

=== Other awards ===
Year	Award	Category	Nominated work	Result	Ref
2005	Korean Music Awards	Best R&B & Soul Album	It's Different	Won	
2010	Melon Music Awards	Best R&B Song	"Because You're A Man"	Won	
2011	Billboard Japan Music Awards	Best New K-Pop Artist	—N/a	Won	
2016	Asia Artist Awards	Soundtrack Award	"You Are My Everything"	Won	
2016	Seoul Music Awards	Soundtrack Award	"You Are My Everything"	Won	
2016	Seoul International Drama Awards	Outstanding Korean Drama OST	"You Are My Everything"	Won	
2019	Melon Music Awards	Best OST	"Remember Me"	Won	
2020	Seoul Music Awards	Best OST	"Remember Me"	Nominated	
