= Choi Young-joon =

South Korean actor

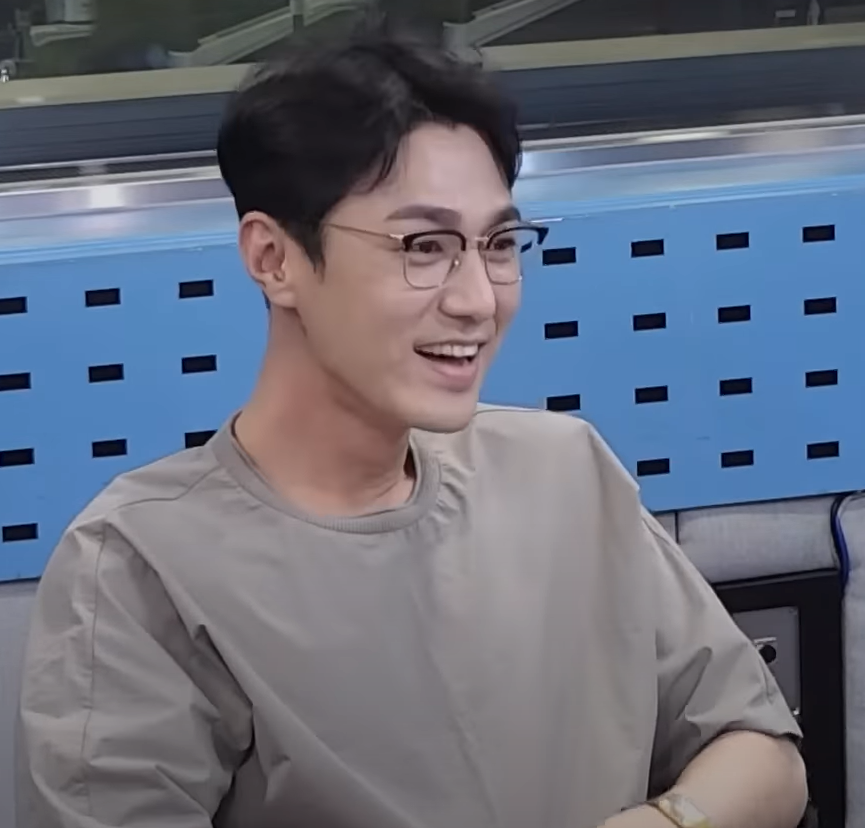
- Choi in June 2022
- Born: July 7, 1980 (age 46); Daegu, South Korea
- Education: Dong-a University
- Occupations: Actor; singer
- Years active: 2002–present
- Agent: Ace Factory
- Spouse: Unknown (m. 2024)

Korean name
- Hangul: 최영준
- Hanja: 崔英俊
- RR: Choe Yeongjun
- MR: Ch'oe Yŏngjun

Choi Young-joon (Korean: 최영준; born July 7, 1980) is a South Korean actor and singer. He began his acting career as a supporting character in the television series Arthdal Chronicles (2019) and Flower of Evil (2020). He is known for his roles in Hospital Playlist (2020–2021), Vincenzo (2021), Our Blues (2022), and Gyeongseong Creature (2023–present).

== Career ==
Choi made his debut in 2002 as a member of boy band 7Dayz. After the group's disbandment, Choi went on to become a musical actor.

== Personal life ==
On September 15, 2024, it was reported that Choi would be getting married in October. The couple married on October 20, 2024, in a private ceremony in Seoul.

== Filmography ==
=== Film ===
Year	Title	Role	Ref.
2025	Omniscient Reader's Viewpoint	Han Myeong-oh	

=== Television ===
Year	Title	Role	Notes	Ref.
2019	Arthdal Chronicles	Yeon-bal		
2020	Flower of Evil	Choi Jae-sub		
2020–2021	Hospital Playlist	Bong Gwang-hyun	Seasons 1–2	
2021	Mine	Baek Dong-hun		
2021	Inspector Koo	Jang Seong-woo		
2021	Vincenzo	Cho Young-woon		
2022	Our Blues	Bang Ho-sik		
2022	The Sound of Magic	Detective Kim		
2022	Why Her	Yoon Se-pil		
2023	Family: The Unbreakable Bond	Musa	Cameo (Eps. 9)	
2023	Bloodhounds	Kang Yong		
2023	Delightfully Deceitful	Ryu Jae-hyeok		
2023–2024	Gyeongseong Creature	Lieutenant General Kato	Seasons 1–2	
2025	The Price of Confession	Jin Young-in		

=== Television shows ===
Year	Title	Role	Notes	Ref.
2023	Black: I Saw the Devil	Cast member	Crime Thriller Crime Documentary (Season 2)	

== Theater ==
=== Musical ===
Year	Title		Role	Theater	Date	Ref.
Year	English	Korean	Role	Theater	Date	Ref.
2006	Number of Animals	마리	Minseong	Ewha Girls' High School 100th Anniversary Hwaam Hall	Dec 7–17	
2009	Midnight Serenade	한밤의 세레나데	Park Jung-ja	Daehakro Arts Theater Small Theater	Jul 11-Aug 16	
2009	Midnight Serenade	한밤의 세레나데	Park Jung-ja	BNK Busan Bank Cho Eun Theatre 1	Sep 3–Oct 4	
2011	Oh! While You were Sleeping	오! 당신이 잠든 사이	Peter	Daehangno Art Plaza 2	Apr 7-Oct 3	
2015–2016	Oh! While You were Sleeping	오! 당신이 잠든 사이	Choi Byong-ho	JTN Art Hall 3	Sep 04-Feb 28	
2018	Interview	인터뷰	Eugene	Daehak-ro Dream Art Center Building 1	Jul 10–Sep 30	
2018	Interview	인터뷰	Eugene	Heulik Hall in Tokyo	Oct 5–8	

=== Theater ===
Year	Title		Role	Theater	Date	Ref.
Year	English	Korean	Role	Theater	Date	Ref.
2022	Come Back	돌아온다	Monk	Arts Centre CJ Towol Theatre	May 7–June 5	
2022	Art	아트	Sergei	Yes 24 Stage 1	Sep 17-Dec 11	

== Awards and nominations ==
Name of the award ceremony, year presented, category, nominee of the award, and the result of the nomination
Award ceremony	Year	Category	Nominee / Work	Result	Ref.
APAN Star Awards	2022	Best Supporting Actor	Our Blues	Nominated	
Korea Culture and Entertainment Awards	2022	Excellence Award, Actor	Our Blues	Won	
