= Noh Hee-kyung =

South Korean writer (born 1966)

- Born: March 21, 1966 (age 60); Hamyang County, South Gyeongsang Province, South Korea
- Education: Seoul Institute of the Arts – Creative Writing
- Occupations: Screenwriter, essayist
- Years active: 1995–present
- Employer(s): GTist (지티스트) (a subsidiary of Studio Dragon)
- Organization(s): Korea Television and Radio Writers Association (KTRWA)

Korean name
- Hangul: 노희경
- Hanja: 盧熙京
- RR: No Huigyeong
- MR: No Hŭigyŏng

Noh Hee-kyung (Korean: 노희경; born March 21, 1966) is a South Korean television screenwriter and essayist. She is best known for her television dramas such as That Winter, the Wind Blows (2013), It's Okay, That's Love (2014), Dear My Friends (2016), Live (2018), and Our Blues (2022).

In 2013, Noh founded drama production house GTist with directors Kim Kyu-tae and Hong Jong-chan and former manager Lee Dong-gyu who is the CEO. In 2019, Studio Dragon, a subsidiary of CJ ENM, became the controlling shareholder of the company.

== Career ==
Noh Hee-kyung has become renowned in South Korea for her realistic, thoughtful and in-depth portrayals of the lives and relationships of ordinary people.

In 1995, she debuted as a dramatist after winning a contest for a best dramatic script.

She began writing in elementary school and received several awards for her early work. After a year of drama studies, she transitioned into professional drama writing. She has since cited the influence of her instructors and the importance of following technical guidance in her career development.

=== Early works, motherhood as theme ===
Noh said she wrote The Most Beautiful Goodbye in the World (1996) two years after the death of her own mother, as a tribute to her. The drama is about a devoted mother in her sixties whose family has always taken her for granted. But when they learn she has been diagnosed with a terminal illness and doesn't have much time left to live, they all come together for the first time to give her the support they haven’t given her before. With heart-wrenching dialogue and meaty performances from Na Moon-hee and Joo Hyun, the TV series brought Noh instant fame. The story of a dying mother resonated with viewers and critics alike, winning the Grand Prize for TV ("Daesang") and Best TV Drama at the 1997 Baeksang Arts Awards. After a 1997 novelization, Noh adapted the drama into a stage play in 2010, which starred Jung Ae-ri and Song Ok-sook in the lead role. In 2011, director Min Kyu-dong made a film adaptation entitled The Last Blossom.

Noh continued writing television dramas. Lie (1998), which started the "mania drama" trend (Korean slang for low ratings but big cult following online), is about a couple played by Lee Sung-jae and Yoo Ho-jeong who are unable to have children, and Bae Jong-ok as the woman who comes between them. In Did We Really Love? (1999), Bae Yong-joon struggles to choose between love or materialism, as embodied by Kim Hye-soo and Yoon Son-ha. Sad Temptation (1999), starring Kim Kap-soo and Joo Jin-mo, was the first drama to feature a gay couple on Korean TV. Foolish Love (2000), starring Lee Jae-ryong and Bae Jong-ok, competed in the same timeslot as the massive hit Hur Jun, and thus became one of the lowest-rated Korean dramas in history, at around 1%. Solitude (2002) dealt with a single mother (Lee Mi-sook) who is pursued by a man (Ryoo Seung-bum) 15 years her junior.

In More Beautiful Than a Flower (2004), Noh explored the many facets of familial love when a mother (the "flower" of the title, played by Go Doo-shim) is diagnosed with dementia. The drama received several awards at the 2004 KBS Drama Awards, including Best Writer for Noh, and the Grand Prize ("Daesang") for Go. It also won Best TV Drama at the 2004 Baeksang Arts Awards.

=== Urban melodramas ===
Goodbye Solo (2006) is an urban melodrama with an ensemble of seven main characters of different generations and backgrounds: a bartender (Chun Jung-myung), an artist (Yoon So-yi), a gangster (Lee Jae-ryong), a restaurant owner (Kim Min-hee), a secretary (Kim Nam-gil), a divorcee (Bae Jong-ok), and a mute old lady (Na Moon-hee). All feeling alienated because of pain in their pasts, they gradually thaw and form a "family" borne out of emotional connection and mutual understanding. Noh said that the story unfolds around one theme: that everyone is beautiful just the way they are. Known for her distinctive and striking dialogue, Noh poured many of her personal stories into the show, including her own experiences with her mother. The drama is also notable for reinventing the career of actress Kim Min-hee. Previously not known as a particularly good actress, Kim was a big fan of Noh's, and she campaigned for a role, even being turned down five times by Noh. But on the sixth attempt, Noh saw the actress's determination and hidden potential that made her right for the character Mi-ri. Despite cries of miscasting from drama fans, Kim went through strict acting training and character analysis, showing great improvement in her performance and making the first steps towards her eventual transformation into a really good actress.

Noh then wrote several short dramas. In the four-episode Miracle (2006), Jang Yong played a man who reassesses his life after learning that he's in the final stages of lung cancer.

In Several Questions That Make Us Happy, three stories unfold in omnibus format over two episodes. The drama's proceeds, including the fees of the writers, directors, and actors (excluding production costs), were donated. The aim of the drama was to emphasize the significance of volunteering in a challenging social environment. It involved several writers, including Noh Hee-kyung, Lee Sun-hee, and Seo Hee-jung, and was directed by Sung Joon-gi, with KBS producers Kim Yong-soo and Hong Seok-gu overseeing the project.

She reunited with director Pyo Min-soo (they had previously worked together on Lie, Sad Temptation, Foolish Love and Solitude) in The World That They Live In (also known as Worlds Within, 2008), about the hectic lives of a drama production team. Hyun Bin and Song Hye-kyo played TV directors who rekindle their romantic relationship. According to Song, after she and Pyo wrapped her last drama Full House in 2004, they had promised to work together with Noh. Song said, "I was their fan and so I had no reason to say no. Noh's writing is so good, it makes playing my role a challenge. It is hard to pull off natural and realistic acting." Noh, for her part, said she "relied a bit more on the actors and was able to express myself more freely."

=== Essays ===
In 2008, Noh published a collection of essays entitled Everyone Not in Love Now Are Guilty. It became a bestseller. The book was divided into four sections with varied themes, namely: "Life is too difficult to concentrate only on love"; "The thing that love demands first, before trust or tears"; "If I could hold all of life and people in my eyes"; "When they were lonely, what did we do?". The essays contained Noh's reflections on life and love, dramas and actresses she's worked with, and the topic of her mother, who has been the most important driving influence in Noh's life.

=== Revival of single-episode dramas ===
After the single-episode anthology series Drama City was cancelled in 2008, TV writers and directors clamored for its revival. And in 2010, the now-renamed Drama Special aired its first episode, Red Candy, which was written by Noh. It starred Lee Jae-ryong as a forty-something married man going through a midlife crisis, who falls for a younger woman (Park Si-yeon) he sees everyday on the subway always carrying a red lollipop. Park said of Noh, "I felt that I had to be in whatever she writes."

=== Cable debut and ratings success ===
Noh then wrote Padam Padam, her first melodrama with elements of fantasy. It was also her first script to be aired on cable television since Padam Padam aired as one of jTBC's inaugural dramas in late 2011. Jung Woo-sung played the leading role of a man recently released from prison after a 16-year sentence for a crime he didn't commit. Noh said she had misjudged Jung as merely "a handsome actor who brightens your mood," but changed her mind after meeting him in person, calling him a "genuine actor." Deeply moved by Noh's previous drama More Beautiful than a Flower, Jung said he had "always wanted to be part of her work but have never had the chance to do so. This character fell into my lap one day, whether by coincidence or destiny." Supporting actor Kim Bum said that after acting the range of emotions his character goes through, he developed greater respect and gratitude towards Noh.

In 2013, Song Hye-kyo and Kim Bum once again committed to join Noh's next project, That Winter, the Wind Blows. Instead of an original script, Noh adapted the 2002 Japanese drama I Don't Need Love, Summer (愛なんていらねえよ、夏, Ai Nante Irane Yo, Natsu). Song starred opposite Zo In-sung, who portrayed a gambler whose survival depended on pulling off the ultimate con ― pretending to be his deceased friend so that the friend's blind sister would hand over her inheritance to him. Unlike most of Noh's dramas, Winter received solid ratings and held the number one spot in its timeslot for 8 consecutive weeks. However, it also disappointed her longtime fans, who criticized the drama for not being realistic enough and focusing excessively on "pretty" imagery.

Noh worked with Zo In-sung again in 2014's It's Okay, That's Love, which also reunited her with Gong Hyo-jin, who had previously starred in Noh's Wonderful Days (2001). This was Noh's fourth collaboration with director Kim Kyu-tae, after Worlds Within, Padam Padam, and That Winter, the Wind Blows. Kim said he and Noh wanted to make a drama that challenged social prejudices against the mentally ill, through the love story of a schizophrenic mystery novelist and a sexually phobic psychiatrist. Noh wrote a letter to the cast and crew on their last read-through that said, "During the rehearsals, we cried and laughed. Because I felt a bit sad about the time left with the team, I forgot about the pain of creativity and wanted to write a couple more episodes." Despite lackluster TV ratings, It's Okay, That's Love drew critical praise and ranked third on the Content Power Index (CPI measures non-traditional variables such as the number of mobile and Internet streaming viewers and online "buzz" in social media). It also kickstarted a micro-trend of Korean dramas with themes related to mental illness, such as Kill Me, Heal Me and Hyde Jekyll, Me.

I prefer passionate people. I dislike cynical individuals the most. I feel uncomfortable around those who spend their time belittling their own lives and those who are sarcastic. That's why my characters don't pretend to suffer alone. They simply endure suffering; they don't pretend to be the only ones suffering. In my younger years, I only saw my own pain. So, I understand why writers in their 30s write such stories. They need time to immerse themselves in their own experiences. However, when a writer reaches their forties or fifties, it's not good to remain engulfed in their own pain. The moment they start to observe and empathize with others' pain is when they become adults. That's why my characters also begin to see the people around them. In "Our Blues," too, each household has its own struggles and sorrows.

in October 2021, Noh announced her latest project Our Blues set in Jeju Island, has a star-studded cast include Lee Byung-hun, Shin Min-a, Cha Seung-won, Lee Jung-eun, Uhm Jung-hwa, Han Ji-min, and Kim Woo-bin. The series portrays the lives of individuals at different stages of their lives, capturing their joys and hardships. Set against the scenic backdrop of Jeju Island, it follows an omnibus format that delves into their stories. The characters are triggered by Eunhee (Lee Jeongeun) and Dongseok (Lee Byunghun).

Our Blues premiered on tvN on April 9, 2022, and aired every Saturday and Sunday at 21:10 (KST) for a total of 20 episodes.

== Philanthropy ==
Noh is close to Pomnyun, a Buddhist monk well known for his involvement in humanitarian issues. They are both active in Join Together Society (JTS Korea), an international relief group which donates to third-world countries and North Korea.

== Works ==
=== Film ===
Film scriptsFilm scripts
| Year | Title | | Credited as | | | Ref. |
| Year | English | Korean | Original Writer | Script Adaptation | Director | Ref. |
|---|---|---|---|---|---|---|
| 2011 | Late Blossom | 세상에서 가장 아름다운 이별 | Noh Hee-kyung | Min Kyu-dong | Min Kyu-dong | |

=== TV series ===
Television series scriptsTelevision series scripts
| Year | Title | | Network | Ref. |
| Year | English | Korean | Network | Ref. |
|---|---|---|---|---|
| 1995 | When Love Shakes | 사랑이 흔들릴때 | MBC TV | |
| 1995 | After Jesus Left, the Men Threw Stones Again | 예수가 떠난 후 남자들은 다시 돌을 던졌다 | MBC TV | |
| 1996 | Mom's Gardenias | 엄마의 치자꽃 | MBC TV | |
| 1996 | MBC Best Theater "Sallie and Suzie" | 세리와 수지 | MBC TV | |
| 1996 | The Most Beautiful Goodbye | 세상에서 가장 아름다운 이별 | MBC TV | |
| 1997 | The Reason I Live | 내가 사는 이유 | MBC TV | |
| 1997 | It's Still Time to Love | 아직은 사랑할 시간 | KBS2 | |
| 1998 | Lie | 거짓말 | KBS2 | |
| 1999 | Sad Temptation | 슬픈 유혹 | KBS2 | |
| 1999 | Did We Really Love? | 우리가 정말 사랑했을까 | MBC TV | |
| 2000 | Foolish Love | 바보같은 사랑 | KBS2 | |
| 2000 | Like Rain | 빗물처럼 | SBS TV | |
| 2001–2002 | Wonderful Days | 화려한 시절 | SBS TV | |
| 2002 | Solitude | 고독 | KBS2 | |
| 2004 | More Beautiful Than a Flower | 꽃보다 아름다워 | KBS2 | |
| 2005 | Becoming a Popular Song | 유행가가 되리 | KBS2 | |
| 2006 | Goodbye Solo | 굿바이 솔로 | KBS2 | |
| 2006 | Miracle | 기적 | MBC TV | |
| 2007 | Several Questions That Make Us Happy | 우리를 행복하게 하는 몇 가지 질문 | KBS2 | |
| 2008 | Worlds Within | 그들이 사는 세상 | KBS2 | |
| 2010 | KBS Drama Special – "Red Candy" | KBS 드라마 스페셜 – "빨강 사탕" | KBS2 | |
| 2011 | Padam Padam | 빠담빠담.... 그와 그녀의 심장박동소리 | JTBC | |
| 2013 | That Winter, the Wind Blows | 그 겨울, 바람이 분다 | SBS TV | |
| 2014 | It's Okay, That's Love | 괜찮아, 사랑이야 | SBS TV | |
| 2016 | Dear My Friends | 디어 마이 프렌즈 | tvN | |
| 2017 | The Most Beautiful Goodbye | 세상에서 가장 아름다운 이별 | tvN | |
| 2018 | Live | 라이브 | tvN | |
| 2022 | Our Blues | 우리들의 블루스 | tvN | |
| TBA | Tantara | 천천히 강렬하게 | Netflix | |

=== Theater ===
Theater worksTheater works
| Year | Title | | Credited as | | | Ref. |
| Year | English | Korean | Original Writer | Playwright | Director | Ref. |
|---|---|---|---|---|---|---|
| 2001 | Mom's Gardenias | 엄마의 치자꽃 | Noh Hee-kyung | Kim Hyeon-tak | Kim Hyeon-tak | |
| 2010 | The Best Play Season 3: The Most Beautiful Goodbye in the World | 연극열전3 - 세상에서 가장 아름다운 이별 | Noh Hee-kyung | Noh Hee-kyung | Lee Jae-gyu | |
| 2011 | The Most Beautiful Goodbye in the World | 세상에서 가장 아름다운 이별 | Noh Hee-kyung | Noh Hee-kyung | Park Jeong-cheol | |

== Book ==
Books published by Noh
| Year | Title | | Publisher |
| Year | English | Korean | Publisher |
|---|---|---|---|
| 1997 | The Most Beautiful Farewell in the World | 세상에서 가장 아름다운 이별 | Hanminsa Temple |
| 2005 | Drama Academy; Lectures on how to write TV dramas by the best writers of our time | 드라마 아카데미 우리시대 최고 작가들의 TV 드라마 작법 강의 | Pentagram |
| 2008 | Those who do not love at this moment, are all guilty Noh Hee-kyung Essay | 지금 사랑하지 않는 자, 모두 유죄 노희경 에세이 | Hermes Media |
| 2009 | The World They Live in 1–2; Noh Hee-kyung's Script Book | 그들이 사는 세상 1~2 노희경 대본집 | Booklog Company |
| 2010 | The Most Beautiful Farewell in the World; Original Novel by Noh Hee-kyung | 세상에서 가장 아름다운 이별 노희경 원작소설 | Booklog Company |
| 2010 | The Most Beautiful Farewell in the World; Noh Hee-kyung's One Act Script Book | 세상에서 가장 아름다운 이별 노희경 단막 대본집 | Booklog Company |
| 2010 | Lies 1–2; Noh Hee-kyung's Script Book | 거짓말 1~2 노희경 대본집 | Booklog Company |
| 2011 | Hot-blooded Youth; 2030 Hope Project delivered by 5 mentors of our era | 열혈청춘 우리 시대 멘토 5인이 전하는 2030 희망 프로젝트 | Phew |
| 2011 | Goodbye Solo 1–2; Noh Hee-kyung's Script Book | 굿바이 솔로 1~2 노희경 대본집 | Booklog Company |
| 2012 | Padam Padam 1–2 The Sound of His and Her Heartbeat; Noh Hee-kyung's Script Book | 빠담빠담 1~2 그와 그녀의 심장 박동 소리 노희경 대본집 | Renaissance |
| 2013 | That Winter, the Wind Blows 1–2; Noh Hee-kyung's Script Book | 그 겨울 바람이 분다 1~2 노희경 대본집 | Booklog Company |
| 2013 | That Winter, the Wind Blows 1–2; Drama Essay | 그 겨울 바람이 분다 드라마 에세이 | Odeon Media |
| 2014 | It's Okay, That's Love 1–2; Noh Hee-kyung's Script Book | 괜찮아 사랑이야 1~2 노희경 대본집 | Booklog Company |
| 2014 | It's Okay, That's Love 1–2; Drama Essay | 괜찮아 사랑이야 1~2 드라마 에세이 | RH Korea |
| 2015 | Those who do not love at this moment, are all guilty Noh Hee-kyung Essay | 지금 사랑하지 않는 자, 모두 유죄 노희경 에세이 | Booklog Company |
| 2015 | The Most Beautiful Farewell in the World; Original Novel by Noh Hee-kyung (Revised Edition) | 세상에서 가장 아름다운 이별 노희경 원작소설 | Booklog Company |
| 2016 | It's Okay, That's Love 1–2; Original Novel by Noh Hee-kyung | 괜찮아 사랑이야 1~2 노희경 원작소설 | Booklog Company |
| 2016 | Dear My Friends 1–2; Noh Hee-kyung's Script Book | 디어 마이 프렌즈 1~2 노희경 대본집 | Booklog Company |
| 2016 | Live script book & making book 1–2 | 라이브 대본집&메이킹북 1~2 | Booklog Company |

== Accolades ==
=== Awards and nominations ===
Awards and nominations
| Year | Ceremony | Category | Work | Result | Ref. |
|---|---|---|---|---|---|
| 1990 | 17th Korea Broadcasting Awards | Drama Division Writer Award | — | Won | |
| 1995 | 1995 MBC Best Theater Competition | Excellence in Writing | MBC Best Theater Sera and Suzy | Won | |
| 1997 | 1997 MBC Drama Awards | Best Drama Writer | The Most Beautiful Goodbye in the World | Won | |
| 1999 | 1999 KBS Drama Awards | Best Drama Writer | Lie | Won | |
| 1999 | 35th Baeksang Arts Awards | Best TV Screenplay | Lie | Won | |
| 2004 | 17th Korea Broadcasting Scriptwriters' Awards | Best Drama Writer | More Beautiful Than a Flower | Won | |
| 2004 | 2004 KBS Drama Awards | Best Drama Writer | More Beautiful Than a Flower | Won | |
| 2005 | 17th Korea Broadcasting Producers' Awards | Best Drama Writer | More Beautiful Than a Flower | Won | |
| 2005 | 11th Shanghai Television Festival | Magnolia Award for Best TV | Becoming a Popular Song | Won | |
| 2005 | 11th Shanghai Television Festival | Best Screenplay | Becoming a Popular Song | Won | |
| 2017 | 53rd Baeksang Arts Awards | Best Screenplay – Television | Dear My Friends | Won | |
| 2022 | APAN Star Awards | Drama of the Year | Our Blues | Nominated | |
| 2022 | APAN Star Awards | Best Writer | Our Blues | Nominated | |
| 2022 | Asian Academy Creative Awards | Best Screenplay | Our Blues | Won | |
| 2022 | Content that Changed the world | Content that impresses the public | Our Blues | Won | |
| 2022 | Seoul Institute of the Arts Alumni Association | Light of Life Award | Noh Hee-kyung | Won | |
| 2023 | 59th Baeksang Arts Awards | Best Drama | Our Blues | Nominated | |

=== State honors ===
Name of country, award ceremony, year given, and name of honor
| Country | Award Ceremony | Year | Honor | Ref. |
|---|---|---|---|---|
| South Korea | Korean Popular Culture and Arts Awards (Note: Honors are given at the Korean Popular Culture and Arts Awards, arranged by the Korea Creative Content Agency and hosted by the Ministry of Culture, Sports and Tourism. They are awarded to those who have contributed to the arts and South Korea's pop culture.) | 2021 | Presidential Commendation | |

=== Listicle ===
Name of publisher, year listed, name of listicle, and placement
| Publisher | Year | List | Placement | Ref. |
|---|---|---|---|---|
| KBS | 2023 | The 50 people who made KBS shine | 21st | |
| Cine21 | 2023 | 22 Writers | Shortlisted | |

== Frequent collaborators ==
- Bae Jong-ok, actress
- Pyo Min-soo, director
- Na Moon-hee, actress
- Lee Jae-ryong, actor
- Youn Yuh-jung, actress
- Kim Kyu-chul, actor
- Kim Kyu-tae, director
- Song Hye-kyo, actress
