= Our Blues =

2022 South Korean television series

- Promotional poster
- Hangul: 우리들의 블루스
- RR: Urideurui beulluseu
- MR: Uridŭrŭi pŭllusŭ
- Genre: Melodrama
- Developed by: Studio Dragon
- Written by: Noh Hee-kyung
- Directed by: Kim Kyu-tae
- Starring: Lee Byung-hun; Shin Min-a; Cha Seung-won; Lee Jung-eun; Uhm Jung-hwa; Han Ji-min; Kim Woo-bin
- Music by: Choi Seung-kwon; Kim Ji-soo
- Country of origin: South Korea
- Original languages: Korean; Jeju Language
- No. of episodes: 20

Production
- Executive producer: Jang Jeong-do
- Producers: Lee Dong-gyu; Kim Seong-min; Kim Nuri
- Running time: 60 minutes
- Production company: GTist

Original release
- Network: tvN
- Release: April 9 – June 12, 2022

Our Blues (Korean: 우리들의 블루스) is a 2022 South Korean television series starring Lee Byung-hun, Shin Min-a, Cha Seung-won, Lee Jung-eun, Uhm Jung-hwa, Han Ji-min, and Kim Woo-bin. The series revolves around the sweet and bitter lives of people at the end or beginning of life, and depicts their stories in an omnibus format against the backdrop of Jeju Island. It premiered on tvN on April 9, 2022, and aired every Saturday and Sunday at 21:10 (KST) with 20 episodes. It is available for streaming on Netflix in selected regions. It is also one of the highest-rated dramas in Korean cable television history.

== Cast ==
=== Main ===
- Lee Byung-hun as Lee Dong-seok, a truck merchant who was born in Jeju.
  - Ryu Hae-jun as young Lee Dong-seok
- Shin Min-a as Min Seon-ah, a single parent with a child who came to Jeju and works with Lee Dong-seok.
  - Kim Ah-song as young Min Seon-ah
- Lee Jung-eun as Jeong Eun-hee, the owner of a fish store who has a bubbly charm.
  - Shim Dal-gi as young Jeong Eun-hee
- Cha Seung-won as Choi Han-soo, who returns to his hometown of Jeju as a perfect urban man and Jeong Eun-hee's first love.
  - Kim Jae-won as young Choi Han-soo
- Uhm Jung-hwa as Go Mi-ran, Eun-hee's best friend from her high school days and her benefactor.
  - Yeon Shi-woo as young Go Mi-ran
- Han Ji-min as Lee Young-ok, a first-year haenyeo.
  - Hong Jung-min as young Lee Young-ok
- Jung Eun-Hye as Young-hee, Lee Young-ok's twin sister, who has Down Syndrome.
- Kim Woo-bin as Park Jeong-joon, a captain with a direct and warm nature.

=== Supporting ===
- Kim Hye-ja as Kang Ok-dong, Lee Dong-seok's mother who abandoned him as child.
- Go Doo-shim as Hyeon Chun-hee, a mercantile woman who has worked for over 60 years. All but one of her children died before reaching adulthood.
- Bae Hyun-sung as Jung Hyun, an 18-year-old high school student born in Jeju.
- Roh Yoon-seo as Bang Young-joo, a high school student born in Jeju who wants to escape to Seoul. She became pregnant with Hyun's child.
  - Ahn Tae-rin as young Bang Young-joo
- Park Ji-hwan as Jung In-kwon, who owns a food stall at a fish market in Jeju Island and Jung Hyun's father.
  - Park Sang-won as young Jung In-kwon
- Choi Young-joon as Bang Ho-sik, an ice maker who sells ice at a fish market in Jeju Island and Bang Young-joo's father.
  - Kang Yi-seok as young Bang Ho-sik
- Ki So-yu as Son Eun-gi, Hyun Chun-hee's 6-year-old granddaughter.

==== Others ====
- Kim Kwang-kyu as Kim Myung-bo, SS Bank branch manager Jeju Pureung, classmate with Han-soo.
- Cho Hye-jung as Dal-i, Young-ok's friend.
- Jung Sung-il as Kim Tae-hoon, Min Seon-ah's sensitive and tired husband.
- Chun Dong-bin as classmate of Bang Young-joo and Jung Hyun
- Park Ji-ah as Hye-ja, haenyeo from Jeju.
- Jung Eun-hye (Note: Jeong is in fact, a real-life Down syndrome patient who works as a painter.) as Lee Young-hui, Young-ok's elder twin sister who has Down syndrome.
  - Jin Hyo-jung as young Lee Young-hui
- Lee So-byul (Note: She is a deaf-impaired actress.) as Byul, a woman who operates a coffee truck in the market. She is the sister of Dal-i, and since she is deaf, she communicates in sign language.
- Baek Seung-do as Park Ki-joon, Jung-jun's younger brother.
- Kim Jung-hwan (Note: Kim is the real-life son of Go Doo-shim, the actress who plays Chun-hee.) as Son Man-su, the sole surviving son of Hyun Chun-hee, Eun-gi's father.
- Min Ji-ah as Oh Hae-sun, Man-su's wife and Eun-gi's mother. After Man-su's accident, she had no choice but to give Eun-gi to Chun-hee to earn money while taking care of Man-su at the hospital.
- Yang Hee-kyung as Ms. Jang, the operator of the orphanage where the two sisters Young-hui and Young-ok lived since childhood.
- Choi Byung-mo as Jong-woo, Dong-seok's stepfather's son.
- Choi Seung-kyung as Jong-cheol, Dong-seok's stepfather's son.
- Yoon Byung-hee as Bae Jeong-muk, a captain who came to Pureung Village from abroad.
- Kim Ha-eon as Kim Yeol, son of Seon-ah and Tae-hoon.
- Kim Young-min as Mi-ran's second ex-husband.
- Park Soon-chun as A wide-eyed, loose-minded aunty who runs a small market in Purung Village.
- Jo Ara as In-jeong, Myung-bo's wife suffers from dysphoria.
- Park Hye-na as Min-jin, Han-soo's wife.
- Hyun Bong-sik as bank customer
- Han Ji-hyun as Hyun Young-joo
- Park Jeong-eon as school teacher
- Kim Gun-ho as Innkeeper

=== Special appearance ===
- Park Sung-yeon as investigator on Seon-ah and Tae-hoon's divorce situation.

== Production ==
=== Development ===
The series written by Noh Hee-kyung is her comeback after the 2018 drama Live. Our Blues, is a 20-episode drama written by Noh Hee-kyung, directed by Kim Gyu-tae and co-produced by Studio Dragon.

The show will be divided into episodes which will be parts of each character.

=== Casting ===
On April 20, 2021, it was reported that Shin Min-a and Kim Woo-bin were offered roles in the series and they were considering it positively. The cast lineup was confirmed on October 10, 2021. The drama represents Kim Woo-bin's return to television after a hiatus of 6 years, with his last TV series being Uncontrollably Fond in 2016.

=== Filming ===
Filming began in Jeju Island in October 2021 after finalizing complete cast. In an interview to Cine21 the director of the series revealed that the series depicts the lives of ordinary people in the Jeju oil field as the background. It has 14 main characters making 8 stories. 70% of the filming was done in Jeju Island.

On February 9, 2022, it was reported that Lee Byung-hun tested positive for COVID-19 and is currently in self-quarantine. The filming for the series has been stopped since February 7. Later On February 21, 2022, actor Lee Byung-hun has posted a picture that he has recovered from COVID-19 symptoms.

On February 17, 2022, actress Han Ji-min posted a photo on SNS saying that her part had finished filming.

On March 27, 2022, actress Shin Min-a posted a photo on SNS saying that her part had finished filming.

== Original soundtrack ==
Our Blues

Soundtrack album by Various Artists
- Released: 2022
- Genre: Soundtrack
- Language: Korean
- Labels: YAMYAM Entertainment; Genie Music; Stone Music Entertainment

=== Part 1 ===
Released on April 10, 2022
No.	Title	Lyrics	Music	Artist	Length
1.	"Whisky on the Rock"	Choi Seong-soo	Choi Seong-soo	Kim Yeon-ji	5:07
2.	"Whisky on the Rock" (Inst.)		Choi Seong-soo		5:07
Total length:					10:14

=== Part 2 ===
Released on April 16, 2022
No.	Title	Lyrics	Music	Artist	Length
1.	"The Last" (마지막 너의 인사)	Jihoon	Lee Seung-joo	Heize	3:59
2.	"The Last" (마지막 너의 인사; Inst.)		Lee Seung-joo		3:59
Total length:					7:58

=== Part 3 ===
Released on April 23, 2022
No.	Title	Lyrics	Music	Artist	Length
1.	"For Love" (봄 to 러브)	Jihoon	Lee Seung-joo; Choi In-hwan	10cm	3:33
2.	"For Love" (봄 to 러브; Inst.)		Lee Seung-joo; Choi In-hwan		3:33
Total length:					7:06

=== Part 4 ===
Released on April 24, 2022
No.	Title	Lyrics	Music	Artist	Length
1.	"With You"	Jihoon	Rocoberry	Jimin (BTS); Ha Sung-woon	3:21
2.	"With You" (Inst.)		Rocoberry		3:21
Total length:					6:42

=== Part 5 ===
Released on May 7, 2022
No.	Title	Lyrics	Music	Artist	Length
1.	"Remember Me" (기억해 줘요)	Jihoon	Jo Ah-ra; Steve DK	Davichi	3:44
2.	"Remember Me" (기억해 줘요; Inst.)		Jo Ah-ra; Steve DK		3:44
Total length:					7:28

=== Part 6 ===
Released on May 8, 2022
No.	Title	Lyrics	Music	Artist	Length
1.	"By My Side" (내 곁에)	Punch; Jihoon	Punch; riskypizza	Taeyeon	3:47
2.	"By My Side" (내 곁에; Inst.)		Punch; riskypizza		3:47
Total length:					7:34

=== Part 7 ===
Released on May 14, 2022
No.	Title	Lyrics	Music	Artist	Length
1.	"Happy Song"	Jihoon	Lee Seung-joo; Choi In-hwan	MeloMance	3:57
2.	"Happy Song" (Inst.)		Lee Seung-joo; Choi In-hwan		3:57
Total length:					7:54

=== Part 8 ===
Released on May 15, 2022
No.	Title	Lyrics	Music	Artist	Length
1.	"Star"	Jihoon	Lee Seung-joo; Lee Ji-hye	STAYC	4:17
2.	"Star" (Inst.)		Lee Seung-joo; Lee Ji-hye		4:17
Total length:					8:34

=== Part 9 ===
Released on May 21, 2022
No.	Title	Lyrics	Music	Artist	Length
1.	"Bye Bye"	Jihoon	Punch; Lee Seung-joo; Choi In-hwan; CHEAT KEYS	Punch	4:02
2.	"Bye Bye" (Inst.)		Punch; Lee Seung-joo; Choi In-hwan; CHEAT KEYS		4:02
Total length:					8:04

=== Part 10 ===
Released on May 22, 2022
No.	Title	Lyrics	Music	Artist	Length
1.	"Once Again"	Jihoon; Viktoria Hansen; Kirat Singh	Cutfather; Jacob Uchorczak; Viktoria Hansen; Kirat Singh	Winter, Ningning (Aespa)	2:49
2.	"Once Again" (Inst.)		Cutfather; Jacob Uchorczak; Viktoria Hansen; Kirat Singh		2:49
Total length:					5:39

=== Chart performance ===
Title	Year	Peak chart position	Remarks
Title	Year	KOR	Remarks
"Whisky on the Rock" (Kim Yeon-ji)	2022	117	Part 1
"The Last" (마지막 너의 인사) (Heize)	2022	90	Part 2
"For Love" (봄 to 러브) (10cm)	2022	83	Part 3
"With You" (Jimin, Ha Sung-woon)	2022	15	Part 4
"Remember Me" (기억해 줘요) (Davichi)	2022	101	Part 5
"By My Side" (내 곁에) (Taeyeon)	2022	88	Part 6
"Happy Song" (MeloMance)	2022	91	Part 7
"Star" (STAYC)	2022	170	Part 8
"Bye Bye" (Punch)	2022	109	Part 9
"Once Again" (Winter, Ningning)	2022	119	Part 10

== Viewership ==
Our Blues : South Korea viewers per episode (millions)

Season	Episode number																				Average
Season	1	2	3	4	5	6	7	8	9	10	11	12	13	14	15	16	17	18	19	20	Average
1	1.845	2.026	1.966	2.215	1.724	1.909	1.924	2.334	2.088	2.612	2.473	2.413	2.270	2.598	2.274	2.667	2.416	2.852	2.899	3.419	2.346

Source: Audience measurement performed nationwide by Nielsen Korea

Average TV viewership ratings
Ep.	Original broadcast date	Average audience share (Nielsen Korea)	
Ep.	Original broadcast date	Nationwide	Seoul
1	April 9, 2022	7.324% (1st)	8.107% (1st)
2	April 10, 2022	8.736% (1st)	10.189% (1st)
3	April 16, 2022	7.897% (1st)	9.022% (1st)
4	April 17, 2022	9.182% (1st)	10.064% (1st)
5	April 23, 2022	7.126% (1st)	7.233% (1st)
6	April 24, 2022	7.722% (1st)	7.870% (1st)
7	April 30, 2022	7.913% (1st)	8.721% (1st)
8	May 1, 2022	9.559% (1st)	10.329% (1st)
9	May 7, 2022	8.810% (1st)	9.303% (1st)
10	May 8, 2022	11.242% (1st)	12.119% (1st)
11	May 14, 2022	10.397% (1st)	10.725% (1st)
12	May 15, 2022	10.796% (1st)	11.112% (1st)
13	May 21, 2022	10.047% (1st)	10.742% (1st)
14	May 22, 2022	10.949% (1st)	11.266% (1st)
15	May 28, 2022	10.065% (1st)	10.618% (1st)
16	May 29, 2022	11.843% (1st)	12.648% (1st)
17	June 4, 2022	10.163% (1st)	10.304% (1st)
18	June 5, 2022	12.541% (1st)	13.198% (1st)
19	June 11, 2022	12.149% (1st)	13.171% (1st)
20	June 12, 2022	14.597% (1st)	15.719% (1st)
Average		9.953%	10.623%
In the table above, the blue numbers represent the lowest ratings and the red numbers represent the highest ratings.; This series aired on a cable channel/pay TV which normally has a relatively smaller audience compared to free-to-air TV/public broadcasters (KBS, SBS, MBC and EBS).

== Accolades ==
Name of the award ceremony, year presented, category, nominee of the award, and the result of the nomination
Award ceremony	Year	Category	Nominee	Result	Ref.
APAN Star Awards	2022	Drama of the Year	Our Blues	Nominated	
APAN Star Awards	2022	Best Writer	Noh Hee-kyung	Nominated	
APAN Star Awards	2022	Top Excellence Award, Actress in a Miniseries	Shin Min-a	Won	
APAN Star Awards	2022	Best Supporting Actor	Park Ji-hwan	Nominated	
APAN Star Awards	2022	Best Supporting Actor	Choi Young-joon	Nominated	
APAN Star Awards	2022	Best Supporting Actor	Yoon Byung-hee	Won	
APAN Star Awards	2022	Best New Actress	Roh Yoon-seo	Nominated	
APAN Star Awards	2022	Best Couple	Kim Woo-bin & Han Ji-min	Nominated	
APAN Star Awards	2022	Best Original Soundtrack	Jimin (BTS) & Ha Sung-woon (for "With You")	Nominated	
Asian Academy Creative Awards	2022	Best Screenplay	Noh Hee-kyung	Won	
Baeksang Arts Awards	2023	Best Drama	Our Blues	Nominated	
Baeksang Arts Awards	2023	Best Director	Kim Kyu-tae	Nominated	
Baeksang Arts Awards	2023	Best Actor	Lee Byung-hun	Nominated	
Busan International Film Festival with Marie Claire Asia Star Awards	2022	Rising Star Award	Roh Yoon-seo	Won	
Content that Changed the world	2022	Content that impresses the public	Our Blues	Won	
Kinolight Awards	2022	Korean Drama Of The Year	Our Blues	5th	
Korea Culture and Entertainment Awards	2022	Excellence Award, Actor	Choi Young-joon	Won	
A-Awards	2022	A-Awards – Impression	Lee Byung-hun	Won	
