= Kim Kyu-tae =

South Korean television director and producer

- Born: South Korea
- Occupation: Television director
- Years active: 1996-present
- Agent: GTist

Korean name
- Hangul: 김규태
- RR: Gim Gyutae
- MR: Kim Kyut'ae

Kim Kyu-tae is a South Korean television director and producer. He directed the Korean dramas A Love to Kill (2005), Iris (2009), Padam Padam (2011), That Winter, the Wind Blows (2013), It's Okay, That's Love (2014), and Moon Lovers: Scarlet Heart Ryeo (2016).

== Career ==
Kim Kyu-tae joined the KBS network in 1996, where he first worked as an assistant director then as a second unit director, notably for Yellow Handkerchief (2003). For the single-episode anthology Drama City, Kim drew critical acclaim in 2004 for two low-budget but visually stylish and experimental episodes: Anagram (starring Kim Yoon-seok and Ku Hye-sun) and Blue Skies of Jeju Island (starring Uhm Tae-woong and Kim Yoon-seok).

A Love to Kill (2005) was Kim's first miniseries as the main director. Written by Lee Kyung-hee, the melodrama starred Rain and Shin Min-a as a K-1 fighter and the actress he targets for revenge but unexpectedly falls for. A Love to Kill was not as well-received ratings-wise as Lee's previous dramas, but Kim won Best New Television Director at the 42nd Baeksang Arts Awards in 2006.

In 2009, he and Yang Yun-ho co-directed Iris, the popular espionage action series starring Lee Byung-hun and Kim Tae-hee. Kim said, "We approached Iris like it was a spy film, so viewers will get to watch movie-like scenes along with the emotional details that have made Korean drama so popular over the years at the same time. [...] We feel great responsibility and excitement at bringing such a genre based on the world's last divided country. While men will be attracted to the action scenes, along with the friendship and revenge between fellow agents and enemies, women can connect with the emotional details between the lovely and handsome characters, torn between love and their duties." Cast member Kim So-yeon said the two different crews were called "Team K" and "Team Y," describing Kim's team as having "a warm charisma and is always filled with quiet laughter. When you shoot in that kind of atmosphere, you feel like you're soaking into that as well."

Kim first worked with screenwriter Noh Hee-kyung when he was the second unit director on The World That They Live In (also known as Worlds Within) in 2008. He reunited with her in 2011 for Padam Padam... The Sound of His and Her Heartbeats, a romance-fantasy about a man who gets released from prison after serving a 16-year sentence for a crime he didn't commit. It was Jung Woo-sung's television comeback and the inaugural drama of newly launched cable network jTBC. Kim said he was "in awe" of Noh's work and wanted to effectively depict her "difficult writing" onscreen.

That Winter, the Wind Blows, a 2013 remake of the Japanese television drama Ai Nante Irane Yo, Natsu ("I Don't Need Love, Summer") in which a con man pretends to be the long-lost brother of a blind heiress, was Kim's third collaboration with Noh and his first time to work for SBS. Kim said, "To help viewers better understand the characters' emotions, I used ultra close-up shots," a visual technique that accentuates even the smallest movement in actors' faces or the twinkle in their eyes. He went on, "The reason we are able to create beautiful shots is because both Jo In-sung and Song Hye-kyo are beautiful people whether we do a full shot or a tight shot. [...] The tone of the drama itself is very heavy that viewers may get frustrated. So I thought the only way to soften up and relax the drama is to capture beautiful scenes. [...] I'm just able to film beautiful things as much as I want." He then used post-production editing to bring out the colors and textures he wanted. Kim was praised for the drama's cinematography, and later won Best Television Director at the 49th Baeksang Arts Awards.

In 2014, Kim directed Secret Love, starring the girl group KARA. It aired on cable channel DRAMAcube and had five different episodes, one for each member of KARA. Scenes from Secret Love were also featured in the music video for the KARA song "Runaway."

Later that year, Kim worked with Noh for the fourth time in It's Okay, That's Love, a romance that explored mental illness, starring Jo In-sung and Gong Hyo-jin as a mystery novelist and a psychiatrist, respectively. Kim called it "a necessary drama," saying he wanted to break away from the traditional genre of a medical drama/romantic comedy by making It's Okay, That's Love into "a hybrid" that puts more weight on breaking the social prejudices toward the minority groups. Kim added, "Ms. Noh, the writer, has the seriousness and the weight and I have the lightness and mass-friendliness. Together we make a great synergy. [...] I personally found it hard to keep the balance between a rom-com and a conventional (melodrama). Every one scene would contain both features. So long as this balance stays unbroken, the drama will be close to perfection."

Kim directed Moon Lovers: Scarlet Heart Ryeo, a Korean remake of the Chinese television series, Scarlet Heart. The 20-episode drama, budgeted at $13 million, premiered on August 29, 2016. The drama is a critical and commercial failure domestically but it drew a more favorable response in other parts of Asia.

== Filmography ==
=== Television series ===
Television series scriptsTelevision series directing credit
Year	Title		Network	Credited as			Ref.
Year	English	Korean	Network	Assistant Director	Main Director	Producer	Ref.
1997	Colors		KBS2	Kim Kyu-tae			
1998	Purity		KBS2	Kim Kyu-tae			
1998–1999	Paper Crane		KBS2	Kim Kyu-tae			
1999	Invitation		KBS2	Kim Kyu-tae			
2000	Tough Guy's Love		KBS2	Kim Kyu-tae			
2001	Orient Theatre		KBS2	Kim Kyu-tae			
2003	Yellow Handkerchief	노란손수건	KBS1	Kim Kyu-tae (2nd Unit)			
2004	Drama City "After Love"	사랑한 후에	KBS2		Kim Kyu-tae		
2004	Drama City "Our Ham"	우리 햄	KBS2		Kim Kyu-tae		
2004	Drama City "Anagram"	아나그램	KBS2		Kim Kyu-tae		
2004	Drama City "Blue Skies of Jeju Island"	제주도 푸른 밤	KBS2		Kim Kyu-tae		
2005	Drama City "Oh! Sarah"	오!사라	KBS2		Kim Kyu-tae		
2005	Loveholic	러브홀릭	KBS2	Kim Kyu-tae (2nd Unit)	Kim Kyu-tae		
2005	A Love to Kill	이 죽일 놈의 사랑	KBS2		Kim Kyu-tae		
2008	Worlds Within	그들이 사는 세상	KBS2	Kim Kyu-tae (2nd Unit)	Pyo Min-soo		
2009	Iris	시티헌터	SBS		Kim Kyu-tae		
2011–2012	Padam Padam	빠담빠담.... 그와 그녀의 심장박동소리	JTBC		Kim Kyu-tae		
2013	That Winter, the Wind Blows	그 겨울, 바람이 분다	SBS		Kim Kyu-tae		
2014	It's Okay, That's Love	괜찮아, 사랑이야	SBS		Kim Kyu-tae	Kim Kyu-tae	
2014	Secret Love	시크릿 러브	DRAMAcube		Kim Kyu-tae		
2016	Dear My Friends	디어 마이 프렌즈	tvN		Kim Kyu-tae		
2016	Moon Lovers: Scarlet Heart Ryeo	달의 연인 – 보보경심 려	SBS		Kim Kyu-tae	Kim Kyu-tae	
2017	The Most Beautiful Goodbye	세상에서 가장 아름다운 이별	tvN		Kim Kyu-tae	Kim Kyu-tae	
2018	Live	라이브	tvN		Kim Kyu-tae	Kim Kyu-tae	
2019	The Crowned Clown	왕이 된 남자	tvN		Kim Hee-won	Kim Kyu-tae	
2019	Hotel del Luna	호텔 델루나	tvN		Oh Chung-hwan	Kim Kyu-tae	
2022	Our Blues	우리들의 블루스	tvN		Kim Kyu-tae		
2024	The Trunk	트렁크	Netflix		Kim Kyu-tae		
2026	Notes from the Last Row	맨 끝줄 소년	Netflix		Kim Kyu-tae		
2026	Gift	기프트	tvN		Kim Kyu-tae		

== Awards ==
Year	Award	Category	Recipient	Result
2006	Asian Television Awards	Best Drama Series	A Love to Kill	Nominated
2010	46th Baeksang Arts Awards	Best Drama	Iris	Won
2010	46th Baeksang Arts Awards	Best Director (Television)	Yang Yun-ho and Kim Kyu-tae	Nominated
2010	3rd Korea Drama Awards	Best Drama	Iris	Nominated
2010	3rd Korea Drama Awards	Best Production Director in a Miniseries	Yang Yun-ho and Kim Kyu-tae	Won
2013	49th Baeksang Arts Awards	Best Director (Television)	Kim Kyu-tae	Won
2013	19th Shanghai Television Festival	Silver Award for Best Foreign TV Series	That Winter, the Wind Blows	Won
2013	8th Seoul International Drama Awards	Outstanding Korean Drama	That Winter, the Wind Blows	Nominated
2013	6th Korea Drama Awards	Best Production Director	Kim Kyu-tae	Nominated
