= Genophobia =

Fear of sexual relations or sexual intercourse

- Other names: Coitophobia
- Specialty: Psychology

Genophobia or coitophobia is the physical or psychological fear of sexual relations or sexual intercourse. The term erotophobia can also be used when describing genophobia; the word "erotophobia" comes from the name of the Greek god of erotic love, Eros. Genophobia can induce panic and fear in individuals, much like panic attacks. People who suffer from the phobia can be intensely affected by attempted sexual contact or just the thought of it. The extreme fear can lead to trouble in romantic relationships. Those afflicted by genophobia may stay away from getting involved in relationships to avoid the possibility of intimacy. This can lead to feelings of loneliness. Genophobic people may also feel lonely because they may feel embarrassed or ashamed of their personal fears.

== Etymology ==
The word genophobia comes from the Greek nouns γένος (genos), meaning "offspring", and φόβος (phobos), meaning "fear". The word coitophobia is formed from the term coitus, referring to the act of copulation in which a male reproductive organ penetrates a female reproductive tract.

== Signs and symptoms ==
Symptoms of genophobia can be feeling of panic, terror, and dread. Other symptoms are increased speed of heartbeat, shortness of breath, trembling/shaking, anxiety, sweating, crying, and avoidance of others.

== Causes ==
There can be many different reasons for why people develop genophobia. Some of the main causes are former incidents of sexual assaults or abuse. These incidents violate the victim's trust and take away their sense of right to self-determination. Another possible cause of genophobia is the feeling of intense shame or medical reasons. Others may have the fear without any diagnosable reason.

=== Rape ===
Rape is the nonconsensual and unlawful act of sexual intercourse forced by one person onto another. This can include penetration, but does not have to. Victims of rape can be of any gender. "Rape is the most extreme possible invasion of a person's physical and emotional privacy." It is considered to be such a heinous crime because victims are attacked in a very personal manner and because physical force or deception can be utilized. Rape can be physically painful, but it can be more emotionally unbearable. Rape is often described as less of an invasion of the body and more of an invasion of "self". Victims often have intense emotional reactions, usually in a predictable order. This is known as rape trauma syndrome.

Rape victims can experience added stress after the assault because of the way hospital staff, police personnel, friends, family, and significant others react to the situation. They can often feel lowered self-esteem and even a sense of helplessness. They long for a sense of safety and control over their lives. Rape victims can develop a fear of sex for physical and psychological reasons. During sexual assault, victims experience physical trauma such as soreness, bruising, pain, genital irritation, genital infection, severe tearing of vaginal walls, and rectal bleeding. They may also grapple with fear of the potential reoccurrence of assault. This possibility for rape can put stress on relationships as well. Some victims can become distrusting and suspicious of others. Rape victims can become fearful of sexual intercourse because of physical pain and mental anguish.

=== Molestation ===
Child molestation, or child sexual abuse, is a form of sexual assault in which a child, an adult or older adolescent abuses a younger child for sexual satisfaction. (A child can molest another child; this is defined as child-on-child sexual abuse). This can include talking to a child about having sex, showing pornography to a child, making a child participate in the production of pornography, exposing genitals to a child, fondling of a child's genitals, or forcing a child to engage in any form of sexual intercourse. Force is not often used in child molestation. Children usually cooperate because they are not fully aware of the significance of what is happening. They also may feel intimidated by the adult or older adolescent.

Victims of child molestation often experience their feelings about the incidents later in life when they can fully understand the importance. They often feel that their privacy has been invaded when they were too young to consent. They can feel like they were taken advantage of and betrayed by those that they trusted. Victims of child molestation can experience long-term psychological traumas. This pushes them to distrust others. The lack of reliance on others can lead to an overall fear of sexual intercourse.

=== Insecurities ===
Some people may become afflicted with genophobia because of body image issues. Some men and women can become obsessively self-conscious of their bodies. This may be regarding their entire physique or it may be focused on one specific issue. Women may become insecure if they dislike the appearance of their labia majora or labia minora. Men may become genophobic if they suffer from erectile dysfunction. Others who grapple with gender dysphoria can also develop a fear of sex.

=== Other fears ===
Some sufferers of genophobia may develop the fear as a result of preexisting fears. Some people may have nosophobia: the fear of contracting a disease or virus. They may also have gymnophobia: the fear of nudity. Others may have extreme fear of being touched. These issues, along with stress disorders, can manifest themselves as the innate fear of sex.

== Treatments ==
There is no universal cure for genophobia. Some ways of coping with or treating anxiety issues is to see a psychiatrist, psychologist, or licensed counselor for therapy. Some people experiencing pain during sex may visit their doctor or gynecologist. Medicine may also be prescribed to treat the anxiety brought on by the phobia.

The independent film Good Dick centers on the theme of genophobia and how it affects a young woman and her relationships with people. It also, indirectly, deals with the theme of incest. The movie was written and directed by Marianna Palka and was released in 2008.

== See also ==
- Asexuality
- Corrective rape
