= That Winter, the Wind Blows =

2013 South Korean romantic melodrama television series

- Promotional poster
- Also known as: Wind Blows in Winter
- Hangul: 그 겨울, 바람이 분다
- RR: Geu gyeoul, barami bunda
- MR: Kŭ kyŏul, parami punda
- Genre: Romance; Melodrama
- Based on: Forget Love by Yukari Tatsui
- Written by: Noh Hee-kyung
- Directed by: Kim Kyu-tae
- Starring: Zo In-sung; Song Hye-kyo
- Composer: Choi Seong-kwon
- Country of origin: South Korea
- Original language: Korean
- No. of episodes: 16

Production
- Executive producers: Kim Young-seob; Cho Jung-ho
- Producers: Beck Chung-hwa; Lee Dong-hoon; Lee Young-joon
- Production location: Korea
- Cinematography: Kim Cheon-seok; Park Jang-hyeok
- Editor: Kim Hyang-sook
- Running time: 60 minutes
- Production companies: BaramiBunda inc. Golden Thumb; Seunghwa Industry Corp.

Original release
- Network: SBS TV
- Release: February 13 – April 3, 2013

Related
- Ai Nante Irane Yo, Natsu; Love Me Not

That Winter, the Wind Blows (Korean: 그 겨울, 바람이 분다) is a 2013 South Korean television romantic drama series broadcast by SBS TV. The series is based on the 2002 Japanese drama series Forget Love (愛なんていらねえよ、夏, Ai nante Irane yo, Natsu) and was previously adapted into the 2006 Korean film Love Me Not. Directed by Kim Kyu-tae, it stars Zo In-sung and Song Hye-kyo. It aired from February 13 to April 3, 2013, replacing The Great Seer and was replaced by All About My Romance. A gambler and con man (Jo) pretends to be the long-lost brother of a blind heiress (Song), but these two damaged people come to find the true meaning of love after getting to know each other.

== Synopsis ==
A melodrama about a man and a blind woman who doesn't believe in love. Oh Soo is an orphan who is left heartbroken after his first love dies. He leads a life as a high-stakes gambler. Oh Young is a lonely visually-impaired heiress whose parents are dead. She has an older estranged brother. She inherited her parents' wealth. Oh Soo pretends to be Oh Young's brother in order to inherit her wealth when she dies. However, the two soon learn the true meaning of love.

== Cast ==
=== Main ===
- Zo In-sung as Oh Soo

An orphan who doesn't care about anything after the death of his first love, he becomes a high-class gambler and playboy. Desperate to find money to repay a debt or forfeit his own life, he becomes a con artist who sets sights on a new target: Oh Young, pretending to be her long-lost brother.

- Song Hye-kyo as Oh Young

A legally blind heiress of a conglomerate. Oh Young lives alone, estranged from her mother and older brother since she was a child.

=== Supporting ===
==== People around Oh Soo ====
- Kim Bum as Park Jin-sung

Soo's best friend and right-hand man. Loyal and hot-headed, Jin-sung dreams of scraping up enough money to buy his father an organic cattle farm.

- Jung Eun-ji as Moon Hee-sun

Younger sister of Soo's first love, Hee-joo. Hee-sun is a quirky, tomboyish girl with a deep fondness for flowers. Though Hee-sun tries to despise Soo after he leaves Hee-joo, she finds that she cannot, and instead helps him in his scheme.

- Kim Tae-woo as Jo Moo-chul

A gangster, with past ties to Soo, Jin-sung, and Hee-sun.

- Seo Hyo-rim as Jin So-ra

Soo's ex-girlfriend and mistress of a gang boss. She steals the boss's money, a crime which Soo is framed for.

- Lee Jae-woo as Oh Soo

Young's older brother, who died in a car accident.

==== People around Oh Young ====
- Bae Jong-ok as Wang Hye-ji

Officially a secretary, she runs the company and is Young's caretaker.

- Kim Kyu-chul as Jang Sung

Family lawyer of the Oh's.

- Kim Young-hoon as Lee Myung-ho

Oh Young's fiancé.

- Im Se-mi as Son Mi-ra

Young's friend who works at a coffee shop.

- Choi Seung-kyung as Shim Joong-tae
- Han Jung-hyun as Kim Jung-hyun

Joong-tae's wife.

==== Others ====
- Kyung Soo-jin as Moon Hee-joo

Soo's first love who was pregnant with his child and dies in a motorcycle accident.

- Go In-beom as Jin-sung's father
- Jung Kyung-soon as Jo Sun-hee

A doctor, and Moo-chul's estranged older sister.

- Kim Jong-hyun as gangster
- Yoo Gun as Jung-woo

Young's first love.

== Production ==
=== Casting ===
Writer Noh Hee-kyung and director Kim Kyu-tae had previously collaborated with Song Hye-kyo on the 2008 series Worlds Within. Kim Bum had also worked with Noh and Kim on the 2011 series Padam Padam... The Sound of His and Her Heartbeats. Jung Eun-ji was the last major casting to be announced; this is her second TV series after the popular Reply 1997.

This marked Zo In-sung's first television series in eight years since Spring Day in 2005, as well as his first acting project since being discharged from mandatory military service. Jo said, "When I first decided to do it, I saw the script and felt it was worth a go. But the more I read it, the more I felt that if I didn't do it right, it would be a total disaster," further explaining that there was a "huge gap between reading the script and acting it out."

Song said about her role as a blind woman, "Because my character cannot see, I am unable to make eye contact with In-sung and can only see how it plays out when I monitor the scenes afterwards. I must rely on his voice and his voice carries enough emotional weight for it to work." Regarding criticism about her characterization, she said, "Many asked why blind people would wear high heels and makeup, even eyeliner. But when I visited facilities for the blind and asked them, they told me that they also wear makeup and colorful clothing."

The four leads attended the drama press conference held on January 31, 2013.

=== Filming ===
On February 4, 2013, Jo cut his hand while filming a scene in Icheon, Gyeonggi Province, where he had to punch a wall in anger, after the glass frame broke on impact. He received 13 stitches for his wound at a nearby hospital, then returned to the set and finished shooting.

When the production filmed on location at Yongpyong Ski Resort in Daegwallyeong-myeon, Pyeongchang, Gangwon Province, fashion magazine High Cut was invited along the shoot for three days and two nights. The feature appeared on the cover of High Cut's March 2013 edition (or Issue 97).

Director Kim Kyu-tae utilized a lot of ultra close-up shots, to highlight the characters' emotions and accentuate the smallest movement in the actors' faces or expression in their eyes. Cinematographer and visual director Kim Cheon-seok said such visual techniques differentiated the show from the standard set by existing Korean dramas, which usually resort to medium shots or bust shots. To produce such detailed shots, the crew used expensive high-definition ALEXA Plus cameras, known for their rich color and high-speed cinematography. Lighting director Park Hwan also employed twice as much lighting equipment as do other dramas. Another technique the crew used was post-production correction, which was possible because when the first episode aired, eight were already taped. Park said, "It's both my and Kim's philosophy that the actress should look beautiful even when she is wailing."

Among the product placements (PPL) in the series were Laneige cosmetics (featured in episode 4 when the character Oh Young gets a makeover at a Laneige store before her high school reunion; Song has been the brand's endorser for six years), tuxedo maker Parkland, and Hyundai Motor Company. Viewers have complained on the drama's website about the overuse of PPL.

=== Locations ===
Oh Young's mansion was filmed at the arboretum Jade Garden in Gangwon Province (Full House Take 2 and Love Rain were also shot there), and her flower garden was filmed at the Hantaek Botanical Garden in Yongin, Gyeonggi Province. The various scenes set in a coffee shop were shot at the Nonhyeon-dong and Cheongdam-dong branches of coffee shop franchise De Chocolate Coffee in Gangnam District, Seoul.

== Original soundtrack ==
That winter The wind blows OST

Soundtrack album by Various artists
- Recorded: 2013
- Genre: Soundtrack
- Languages: Korean; English
- Label: LOEN Entertainment Golden Thumb

=== Part 1 ===
Released on February 13, 2013
No.	Title	Music	Artist	Length
1.	"Gray Paper"	Kangta	Yesung	4:35
2.	"Gray Paper" (Inst.)	Kangta		4:35
Total length:				9:10

=== Part 2 ===
Released on February 20, 2013
No.	Title	Music	Artist	Length
1.	"Winter Love"	Kangta	The One	3:27
2.	"Winter Love" (Inst.)	Kangta		3:27
Total length:				6:50

=== Part 3 ===
Released on February 27, 2013
No.	Title	Music	Artist	Length
1.	"Snowflake"	Kangta	Gummy	3:28
2.	"Snowflake" (Inst.)			3:28
Total length:				6:52

=== Part 4 ===
Released on March 3, 2013
No.	Title	Music	Artist	Length
1.	"Tears Falling"	Kangta	Kim Boa (SPICA )	3:50
2.	"Tears Falling" (Guitar ver.)	Kangta		3:50
3.	"Tears Falling" (inst.)			3:50
4.	"Tears Falling (Guitar ver.)" (inst.)			3:50
Total length:				12:54

=== Part 5 ===
Released on March 13, 2013
No.	Title	Music	Artist	Length
1.	"And One"	Kangta	Taeyeon	4:10
2.	"And One" (Inst.)			4:10
Total length:				8:20

Disc 2:
No.	Title	Artist	Length
1.	"Blind Love"	Various Artists	2:03
2.	"Wanting to Live"	Various Artists	1:44
3.	"With U"	Various Artists	2:37
4.	"Goodbye Happiness"	Various Artists
5.	"7.8 billion won"	Various Artists	1:34
6.	"Love and Such Is Not Necessary"	Various Artists	1:56
7.	"It's Over"	Various Artists	1:50
8.	"Winter Wind"	Various Artists	3:47
9.	"Room of Secrets"	Various Artists	1:56
10.	"Open Your Eyes"	Various Artists	2:26
11.	"Poker Face"	Various Artists	1:35
12.	"Misunderstanding"	Various Artists	1:41
13.	"Black Jack"	Various Artists	3:33
14.	"Warm Eyes"	Various Artists	2:05
15.	"Young's Room"	Various Artists	2:56
16.	"Meeting Love in Winter"	Various Artists	3:45

== Reception ==
According to AGB Nielsen Media Research, the premiere episode achieved a nationwide rating of 11.3 percent in viewership, ranked third behind Iris II on KBS and 7th Grade Civil Servant on MBC. The second back-to-back episode rose 1.5 percent to 12.8 percent. By the third episode the series was ranked first along with Iris II at 12.4 percent, then both episodes the following week were ranked first in their timeslot. In its third week, That Winter, the Wind Blows remained on top, while its two rival series competed for second place with small differences in viewership rating. According to TNmS, the series continued to rank number one in its timeslot for the remainder of its broadcast, though quoting slightly different figures. The series finale maintained its first-place ranking and recorded its highest rating with a viewership of 15.4 and 15.8 percent nationwide, and an average of 19.1 and 18.2 percent in the Seoul National Capital Area, according to TNmS and AGB Nielsen respectively.

Ep.	Original broadcast date	Average audience share			
Ep.	Original broadcast date	AGB Nielsen		TNmS Ratings	
Ep.	Original broadcast date	Nationwide	Seoul	Nationwide	Seoul
1	February 13, 2013	11.3%	13.0%	10.1%	12.2%
2	February 13, 2013	12.8%	14.5%	12.0%	14.0%
3	February 14, 2013	12.4%	13.8%	12.3%	14.4%
4	February 20, 2013	13.4%	14.6%	12.5%	14.0%
5	February 21, 2013	14.1%	15.5%	12.9%	15.3%
6	February 27, 2013	13.0%	13.9%	11.5%	12.8%
7	February 28, 2013	13.9%	14.9%	11.8%	13.5%
8	March 6, 2013	13.3%	14.8%	11.3%	13.9%
9	March 7, 2013	14.4%	16.1%	13.5%	15.5%
10	March 13, 2013	14.2%	16.1%	12.3%	14.7%
11	March 14, 2013	14.9%	16.9%	12.1%	13.6%
12	March 20, 2013	13.3%	14.4%	11.6%	13.6%
13	March 21, 2013	15.3%	17.3%	13.6%	15.4%
14	March 27, 2013	14.7%	16.2%	12.7%	15.1%
15	March 28, 2013	15.1%	16.9%	13.6%	15.6%
16	April 3, 2013	15.8%	18.2%	15.4%	19.1%
Average		13.9%	15.4%	12.5%	14.5%

== In the media ==
Scenes from the drama were parodied by sketch comedy show Saturday Night Live Korea on cable channel tvN. On the episode broadcast on March 9, 2013, hosts Lee Young-ja and Shin Dong-yup, in the roles of Oh Young and Oh Soo, respectively, performed a 19+ skit in the SNLK style, including a parody of the cotton candy kiss. The series also been parodied in SBS's own Running Man

In March 2013, Song sponsored the cost of publication of guidebooks for the blind at the Independence Hall of Korea in Cheonan, South Chungcheong Province. The project was organized by Seo Kyoung-duk, a professor at Sungshin Women's University, after learning that braille brochures were unavailable at the site and other local museums despite the large number of visually impaired visitors. Song joined the effort at Seo's suggestion in November 2012, noting that her role as a blind woman helped her better understand the daily challenges faced by people with disabilities.

== Awards and nominations ==
Year	Award	Category	Recipient	Result
2013	49th Baeksang Arts Awards	Best Director (Television)	Kim Kyu-tae	Won
2013	49th Baeksang Arts Awards	Best Actress (Television)	Song Hye-kyo	Nominated
2013	19th Shanghai Television Festival	Silver Award for Best Foreign TV Series	That Winter, the Wind Blows	Won
2013	7th Mnet 20's Choice Awards	20's Drama Star – Male	Zo In-sung	Nominated
2013	7th Mnet 20's Choice Awards	20's Drama Star – Female	Song Hye-kyo	Nominated
2013	8th Seoul International Drama Awards	Outstanding Korean Drama	That Winter, the Wind Blows	Nominated
2013	8th Seoul International Drama Awards	Outstanding Korean Actor	Zo In-sung	Nominated
2013	8th Seoul International Drama Awards	Outstanding Korean Actress	Song Hye-kyo	Nominated
2013	8th Seoul International Drama Awards	Outstanding Korean Drama OST	The One (Winter Love)	Nominated
2013	8th Seoul International Drama Awards	Outstanding Korean Drama OST	Taeyeon (And One)	Nominated
2013	6th Korea Drama Awards	Daesang (Grand Prize)	Song Hye-kyo	Nominated
2013	6th Korea Drama Awards	Best Production Director	Kim Kyu-tae	Nominated
2013	6th Korea Drama Awards	Best Writer	Noh Hee-kyung	Nominated
2013	2nd APAN Star Awards	Daesang (Grand Prize)	Song Hye-kyo	Won
2013	2nd APAN Star Awards	Top Excellence Award, Actor	Zo In-sung	Nominated
2013	2nd APAN Star Awards	Top Excellence Award, Actress	Song Hye-kyo	Nominated
2013	2nd APAN Star Awards	Acting Award, Actor	Kim Kyu-chul	Nominated
2013	2nd APAN Star Awards	Acting Award, Actor	Kim Tae-woo	Nominated
2013	2nd APAN Star Awards	Best Performance	Jung Eun-ji	Won
2013	2nd APAN Star Awards	Best OST	"Winter Love" – The One	Won
2013	15th Mnet Asian Music Awards	Best OST	"Winter Love" – The One	Nominated
2013	SBS Drama Awards	SBS Special Award	Zo In-sung	Won
2013	SBS Drama Awards	Top Excellence Award, Actor in a Miniseries	Zo In-sung	Nominated
2013	SBS Drama Awards	Top Excellence Award, Actress in a Miniseries	Song Hye-kyo	Won
2013	SBS Drama Awards	Excellence Award, Actor in a Miniseries	Kim Bum	Nominated
2013	SBS Drama Awards	Special Award, Actor in a Miniseries	Kim Tae-woo	Nominated
2013	SBS Drama Awards	Special Award, Actress in a Miniseries	Bae Jong-ok	Nominated
2013	SBS Drama Awards	New Star Award	Jung Eun-ji	Won
2013	SBS Drama Awards	Top 10 Stars	Zo In-sung	Won
2013	SBS Drama Awards	Top 10 Stars	Song Hye-kyo	Won
2013	SBS Drama Awards	Best Couple Award	Zo In-sung and Song Hye-kyo	Nominated
2014	23rd Seoul Music Awards	Best OST	The One (Winter Love)	Won
