= The Most Beautiful Goodbye =

South Korean television series

- Promotional poster
- Hangul: 세상에서 가장 아름다운 이별
- RR: Sesangeseo gajang areumdaun ibyeol
- MR: Sesangesŏ kajang arŭmdaun ibyŏl
- Genre: Family; Melodrama
- Developed by: Studio Dragon
- Written by: Noh Hee-kyung
- Directed by: Hong Jong-chan
- Starring: Won Mi-kyung; Choi Ji-woo; Kim Young-ok; Choi Min-ho
- Country of origin: South Korea
- Original language: Korean
- No. of episodes: 4

Production
- Executive producer: Kim Kyu-tae
- Production company: GTist

Original release
- Network: tvN
- Release: December 9 – December 17, 2017

Related
- The Most Beautiful Goodbye in the World (MBC, 1996)

The Most Beautiful Goodbye (Korean: 세상에서 가장 아름다운 이별; lit. 'The Most Beautiful Goodbye in the World') is a 2017 South Korean television series starring Won Mi-kyung, Choi Ji-woo, Kim Young-ok and Choi Min-ho. It is a remake of the drama of the same name by Noh Hee-kyung that aired in 1996 on MBC. The series aired on tvN every Saturdays and Sundays at 21:00 (KST) for 4 episodes.

== Synopsis ==
A self-sacrificing mother who receives a terminal cancer diagnosis and prepares to say goodbye to her family. Her illness brings her family together for the first time, to support her at the very end of her life.

== Cast ==
- Won Mi-kyung as Kim In-hee

A wife and mother diagnosed with late-stage terminal cancer who has devoted her entire adult life to her ungrateful family.

- Choi Ji-woo as Yeon-soo

In-hee's daughter.

- Yoo Dong-geun as Jung Cheol

In-hee's husband.

- Kim Young-ok as Grandma

In-hee's mother-in-law who has Alzheimer.

- Choi Min-ho as Jung-soo

In-hee's rebellious son.

- Son Na-eun as Chae-young

Jung-soo love interest.

- Yeom Hye-ran as Shin Yang-soon, Kim Geun-deok's wife
- Yoo Jae-myung as Kim Geun-deok, In Hee's brother

== Production ==
- The series was originally scheduled to air on MBC in commemoration of the original series, but due to a strike of the former's employees, it was transferred to tvN.
- It is directed by Hong Jong-chan, who also directed Noh's Dear My Friends.

== Original soundtrack ==
No.	Title	Artist	Length
1.	"Angel"	Gummy (거미)	3:45

== Ratings ==
In this table, the blue numbers represent the lowest ratings and the red numbers represent the highest ratings.

Ep.	Original broadcast date	Average audience share		
Ep.	Original broadcast date	AGB Nielsen		TNmS
Ep.	Original broadcast date	Nationwide	Seoul	Nationwide
1	December 9, 2017	3.248%	4.047%	3.2%
2	December 10, 2017	3.888%	4.101%	3.7%
3	December 16, 2017	3.346%	3.713%	3.7%
4	December 17, 2017	6.176%	6.214%	6.0%
Average		4.164%	4.519%	4.2%

- This drama airs on a cable channel/pay TV which normally has a relatively smaller audience compared to free-to-air TV/public broadcasters (KBS, SBS, MBC and EBS).
