= The King: Eternal Monarch =

2020 South Korean television series

- Promotional poster
- Hangul: 더 킹: 영원의 군주
- Hanja: 더 킹: 永遠의 君主
- RR: Deo king: yeongwonui gunju
- MR: Tŏ k'ing: yŏngwŏnŭi kunju
- Genre: Romance; Fantasy
- Written by: Kim Eun-sook
- Directed by: Baek Sang-hoon; Jung Ji-hyun; Yoo Je-won
- Starring: Lee Min-ho; Kim Go-eun; Woo Do-hwan; Kim Kyung-nam; Jung Eun-chae; Lee Jung-jin
- Music by: Gaemi
- Country of origin: South Korea
- Original language: Korean
- No. of episodes: 16

Production
- Executive producers: Jinnie Choi; Yoon Ha-rim
- Camera setup: Single camera
- Running time: 70 – 79 minutes
- Production companies: Hwa&Dam Pictures; Studio Dragon
- Budget: >30 billion Won

Original release
- Network: SBS TV
- Release: April 17 – June 12, 2020

The King: Eternal Monarch (Korean: 더 킹: 영원의 군주) is a 2020 romantic-fantasy South Korean television series starring Lee Min-ho, Kim Go-eun, Woo Do-hwan, Kim Kyung-nam, Jung Eun-chae, and Lee Jung-jin. Written by Kim Eun-sook and produced by Hwa&Dam Pictures and its parent company Studio Dragon, the series premiered on SBS TV and Netflix for the global audience on April 17, 2020.

Set in two parallel worlds, the series follows Emperor Lee Gon of the Kingdom of Corea, who discovers access to an alternate reality after crossing a mythical door opened by his half-uncle, Lee Lim, where the Republic of Korea exists in the Kingdom's stead and sets out to put an end to Lee Lim's atrocities and retrieve the other half of Manpasikjeok used as a portal between two worlds.

Hailed as one of the most anticipated series in the first half of 2020 due to its ensemble cast, screenwriter, extensive publicity and production budget, the series set a record for SBS's highest 2020 Friday-Saturday drama premiere ratings. It also maintained the No.1 spot on the weekly Wavve drama chart for eight consecutive weeks, and was listed as the most popular Korean drama series on Netflix in India, Malaysia, Philippines and Singapore and one of the top two in the U.S. The series received mixed reviews and lower-than-expected domestic TV viewership ratings on later episodes, with news media attributing it to competition from streaming platforms and criticism of its screenplay, production and various controversies.

== Synopsis ==
Lee Gon (Lee Min-ho), a modern-day Emperor of the Kingdom of Corea, attempts to cross the barrier into an alternate reality where the Republic of Korea exists in the Kingdom's stead. He comes across detective Jeong Tae-eul (Kim Go-eun), whom he recognizes from an identity card he obtained during the turning point of his childhood: his father's assassination. Lee Gon's half-uncle, Lee Lim (Lee Jung-jin), who assassinated the previous king, Lee Ho (Lee Gon's father), is in hiding and assembling armies whilst traversing back and forth between the two parallel worlds.

== Cast ==
=== Main ===
- Lee Min-ho as Lee Gon / Lee Ji-hun
  - Jung Hyeon-jun as young Lee Gon and young Lee Ji-hun

Lee Gon: The third king of the Kingdom of Corea. He is a mathematician and a rower. He is a compulsive and reticent person. He is sensitive when touched by others and does not easily let go of his skepticism towards someone. He often leaves the palace grounds to wander around, either to tend to his curious mind or to escape the palace life. For him, the Royal Palace represents the safety of home, but it is also his most deadly battleground. When he was eight years old, he witnessed the assassination of his father by his half-uncle, Lee Lim. While he was being choked to death, he was saved by an unknown person with Jeong Tae-eul's identity card.
Lee Ji-hun: Lee Gon's counterpart in South Korea. He was killed by Lee Lim when he was a child after Lee Lim escapes to Republic of Korea following Lee Ho's assassination.

- Kim Go-eun as Jeong Tae-eul / Luna
  - Kim Si-woo as young Jeong Tae-eul
  - Lee Ye-won as young Luna (Ep. 16)

Jeong Tae-eul: A police officer ranked Inspector (equivalent to a lieutenant in the South Korean armed forces) in the Violent Crimes Squad Three of the National Police Agency of South Korea. She has a strong will and concrete personality. As a child, she was interested in crime TV shows which led her to become a detective.
Luna: Jeong Tae-eul's counterpart who is a criminal in the Kingdom of Corea. Shortly after her birth, she was abandoned in a slum in Busan. With no parents and no identification, no official records document her existence. As she grew older, her arrest record expanded to include burglary, breaking and entering, assault and forgery. Her imprisonment led to her being legally-documented as Luna, a name she gave herself after a stray cat that had survived in the slum. Moreover, she suffers from terminal cancer resulting in organ failure and has only few months left to live.

- Woo Do-hwan as Jo Yeong / Jo Eun-sup
  - Jung Si-yul as young Jo Yeong

Jo Yeong: Captain of the Royal Guard of the Kingdom of Corea, and childhood friend of Lee Gon. He exudes a sharp image and stoic professionalism. Jo Yeong first met Lee Gon at his coronation ceremony, when he was four years old. They share a bond of friendship and brotherhood. Jo Yeong treats Lee Gon as his country and his law, whom he must always protect.
Jo Eun-sup: Jo Yeong's counterpart who is currently serving his mandatory military duties as a guard for the National Police Agency of South Korea. He is humorous, free-willed and joyous. His wish is to get discharged soon. He deeply cares for his younger twin siblings, Eun-bi and Kka-bi, and often helps his parents in looking after them. He also has a crush on his childhood friend, Myeong Na-ri.

- Kim Kyung-nam as Kang Shin-jae / Kang Hyeon-min
  - Moon Woo-jin as young Kang Shin-jae and young Kang Hyeon-min

Kang Shin-jae: A detective in the Violent Crimes Squad Three of the National Police Agency of South Korea. Although he had an ideal childhood at first, his father was imprisoned for embezzlement and his mother soon fell prey to gambling, leading to a tense relationship between them. He has had a crush on Jeong Tae-eul since their high school days.
Kang Hyeon-min: Kang Shin-jae's counterpart in Kingdom of Corea.

- Jung Eun-chae as Koo Seo-ryeong / Koo Eun-ah
  - Shin Soo-yeon as young Koo Seo-ryeong

Koo Seo-ryeong: The youngest and first female prime minister of the Kingdom of Corea. Despite being born into a broken family, having a drunkard father and a hardworking mother who runs a fish cake shop, she went on to study hard and became an announcer. Although elegant, confident and independent, she is also extremely ambitious and greedy. She married Chairman Choe of KU Group, before divorcing him for alimony. She became a diplomat and then Prime Minister. Her ambition knows no bounds even after making the Prime Minister and she now wants to become the Queen of the Kingdom of Corea.
Koo Eun-ah: Koo Seo-ryeong's counterpart in Republic of Korea.

- Lee Jung-jin as Prince Imperial Geum, Lee Lim / Lee Seong-jae

Lee Lim: The Illegitimate half-brother of King Lee Ho and half-uncle of Lee Gon. He wishes to obtain the Manpasikjeok, a mythical flute which he believes would allow him to attain a life of eternity. He assassinates the King Lee Ho and takes hold of the flute before young Lee Gon breaks the flute into two halves with the Four Tiger Sword. With one half of the flute, he escapes to the parallel universe and kills his counterpart in the alternate reality. He aims to retrieve the second half of the flute, which is now in Lee Gon's possession, to utilise it to its full potential after realising it allows him to access multiple realities and travel through time.

=== Supporting ===
- Kim Young-ok as Noh Ok-nam

Head Court Lady of the Imperial Household. Since the assassination of King Lee Ho, she has the presence of a parental figure in Lee Gon's life.

- Jeon Bae-soo as Jeong Do-in

Jeong Tae-eul's father. He owns and runs the Hero Academy for taekwondo as the head instructor.

- Kim Jung-young as Kim Seong-ae

Koo Seo-ryeong's mother. She works in a fish

- Kim Yong-ji as Myeong Na-ri / Myeong Seung-ah

Myeong Na-ri: Jeong Tae-eul's landlady and friend. She runs a cafe near the taekwondo centre.
Myeong Seung-ah: New staff at the Royal Public Affairs Office.

- Kang Hong-seok as Jang Michael (Jangmi) / Jang Mi-reuk

Jang Michael: New recruit of the Violent Crimes Squad Three.
Jang Mi-reuk: Trainee at the Royal Guard.

- Hwang Young-hee as Min Hwa-yeon / Park Sook-jin

Min Hwa-yeon: Kang Shin-jae's mother. After her husband is jailed for embezzlement, she falls prey to gambling. This leads to a tense relationship between her and Shin-jae.
Park Sook-jin: Worker at the Imperial Household.

==== Imperial Household, Kingdom of Corea ====
- Jeon Moo-song as Prince Buyeong, Lee Jong-in

Lee Gon's uncle who is second-in-line to the throne after Lee Gon. He is a professor and doctor by profession.

- Baek Hyun-joo as Secretary Mo

Lee Gon's secretary.

- Lee Hong-nae as Seok Ho-pil

Vice-captain of the Royal Guard

==== Jongno Police Station, South Korea ====
- Park Won-sang as Park Moon-sik

Chief detective of Violent Crimes Squad Three.

- Heo Dong-won as Detective Shim

A detective of Violent Crimes Squad Three

- Ahn Si-ha as Kim Hee-joo
- Song Sang-eun as Kyung-ran
- Lee Hae-young as Yoo Kyung-moo

Lee Lim's assistant. He runs the Eosu bookstore in Kingdom of Corea.

=== Others ===
==== Kingdom of Corea ====
- Kwon Yul as Lee Ho, Lee Gon's father (Ep. 1, 4 & 14)
- Son Kyung-won as Lee Seung-heon, Prince Buyeong's son (Ep. 1, 11 & 15)

Lee Seung-heon: The traitor who let Lee Lim escape the Royal Palace.

- Bae Sung-il as Kim Gi-hwan (Ep. 1, 7–9, 11)
- Park Hoon as Jo Yeong's father (Ep. 1)
- Bae Sung-il as Kim Gi-hwan (Ep. 1, 7–9, 11)
- Kim Ki-moo as a gangster (Ep. 1–2, 6)
- Joo Ye-rim as Min-ji (Ep. 1)
- Kim Bo-min as Yoyo Boy
  - Yoon Jung-hyuk as adult Yoyo Boy

The mysterious boy with a yo-yo who controls the parallel universes (Ep. 3,4,8–11, 14, 16)

- Jeon No-min as Captain Choi Gi-taek (Ep. 4 & 6)
- Ha Seung-youn as the train booking clerk (Ep. 5)
- Shin Hyun-jong as Lee Jung-hoon, the horse doctor (Ep. 5, 7 & 9)
- Lee Yoon-sang as a government official (Ep. 6)
- Sung Chan-ho as the Deputy Prime Minister (Ep. 6 & 13)
- Park Yong as the military official (Ep. 6)
- Ha Seung-ri as Jang Yeon-ji (Ep. 7–11, 16)
- An Seok-hyun as the ice cream shop boy (Ep. 8)
- Tae In-ho as Chairman Choe Min-heon (Ep. 9–10)
- Bae Bo-ram as a reporter (Ep. 10)
- Min Eung-sik as a government official (Ep. 10 & 12)
- Kim Seung-tae as a government official (Ep. 10 & 12)
- Kang Moon-kyung as a government official (Ep. 10 & 12)
- Park Jung-eon as a restaurant manager (Ep. 12)
- Lee Se-rang as a masseuse (Ep. 13)
- Seo Woo-jin as Secretary Mo's son (Ep. 16)
- Choi Moo-in as Detective Kang Jun-hyuk from the Kingdom of Corea
- Kang Ki-doong as Secretary Kim, Koo Seo-ryeong's secretary
- Lee Hwang-ui as Koo Seo-ryeong's lobbyist
- Park Ji-yeon as Park Ji-young, Koo Seo-ryeong's friend
- Tae In-ho as Choe Min-hwan

Chairman of KU Group and Koo Seo-ryeong's ex-husband.

- Kim Wook as Choi Nam-jin / bully

Choi Nam-jin: Lee Gon's colleague (Ep. 1, 4 & 16)
Bully: A high-school bully and Shin-jae's classmate. (Ep. 6 & 16)

==== South Korea ====
- Seo Jeong-yeon as Song Jung-hye
  - Ko Eun-min as young Song Jung-hye (Ep. 1–2, 16)

Lee Ji-hun's mother.

- Baek Seung-chul as a security guard (Ep. 1)
- Heo Jae-ho as Kim Bok-man, a murder suspect (Ep. 1–2)
- Park So-jin as Jo Hae-in, Kang Shin-jae's therapist
- Seol Woo-hyung as Jo Eun-woo / Kka-bi, Eun-sup's younger brother (Ep. 2, 6, 10, 13 & 15)
- Jung Ye-na as Jo Eun-bi, Eun-sup's younger sister (Ep. 2, 6, 10, 13 & 15)
- Yoon Sung-woo as Myung-ho, a physically disabled boy (Ep. 2)
- Yang Jo-ah as Ms. Baek, Myung-ho's mother (Ep. 2, 12, 14–15)
- Cha Sung-je as the boy at the birthday party (Ep. 2)
- Seo Jang-hyun as the boy at the birthday party (Ep. 2)
- Lee Hye-ra as Park Soo-yeon (Ep. 2)
- Kim Jong-tae as Lee Sang-do (Ep. 2, 7, 9, 11–12)
- Ahn Jung-ho as the arrested criminal mistaken to be a new recruit (Ep. 3)
- Hong Ye-ji as Yoon Bo-young from the police station (Ep. 3)
- Yang Hyun-min as a gambling boss (Ep. 3–4 & 9)
- Lee Ho-cheol as Dalgoo, a gang boss (Ep. 3 & 8)
- Jo Jae-yoon as an arcade worker in charge of the shooting game (Ep. 5 & 7)
- Lee Ji-hyun as Jo Eun-sup's mother (Ep. 10)
- Kim Dong-gyun as Kang Shin-jae's father (Ep. 14)
- Woo Ji-hyun as a rookie in the police station (Ep. 16)

== Production ==
=== Development ===
On May 7, 2019, Hwa&Dam Pictures officially announced the production of the series. Along with the series' announcement, it was also confirmed that Kim Eun-sook and Baek Sang-hoon will write and direct the series respectively. Later, it was reported that Jung Ji-hyun will also participate in the direction of the series. On May 8, 2020, while the series was airing, it was revealed that Yoo Je-won will join the production as a director.

The total production cost of the series was reported to be over 30 billion Won (US$25 million), which the production company was able to recoup from the broadcast deal with SBS and the overseas licensing agreement with Netflix before the premiere of the first episode.

=== Casting ===
On May 7, 2019, Hwa&Dam Pictures confirmed that Lee Min-ho would star as the male lead, reuniting with writer Kim Eun-sook, with whom he had collaborated previously on SBS hit series, The Heirs (2013). On the 20th, it was announced that Kim Go-eun would play the role of the female lead, also reuniting the actress with Kim, with whom she had collaborated previously on tvN hit series, Guardian: The Lonely and Great God (2016). On June 3, Woo Do-hwan confirmed on taking dual roles as Jo Eun-sup and Jo Yeong. On June 10, Son Seok-gu and Jung Eun-chae were offered roles in the series, with Son deciding not to appear in the series and Jung confirming her role. A week later, Kim Kyung-nam confirmed his role.

This series also serves as a reunion for Lee Min-ho and Kim Young-ok, who had a similar on-screen relationship in the KBS hit series, Boys Over Flowers (2009).

=== Filming ===
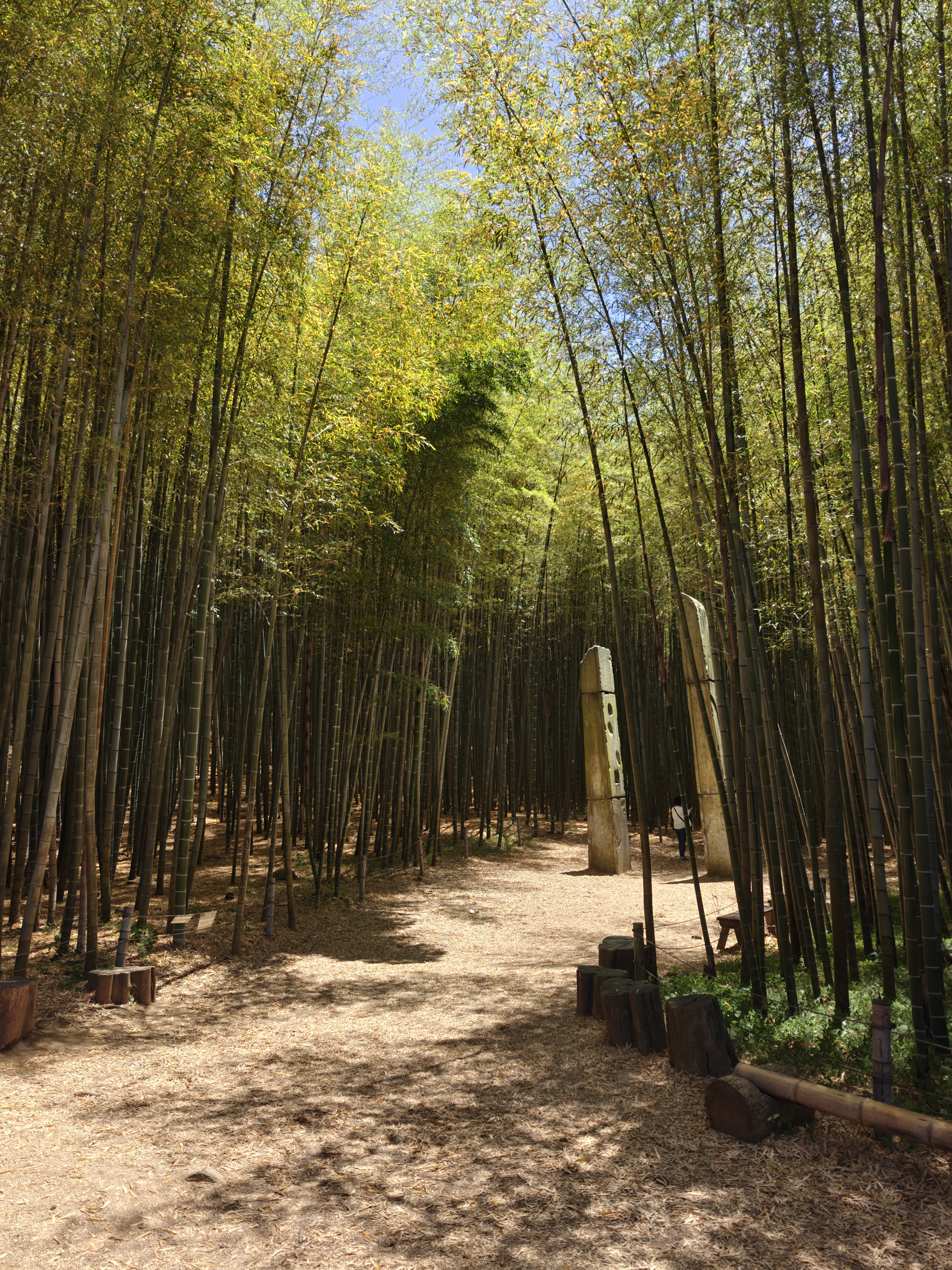
Ahopsan forest, Busan, South Korea with the filming location of the series

The first script reading took place on September 17, 2019, while the Principal photography began on October 23, 2019, and ended on May 28, 2020, after seven months. Lee Min-ho and Kim Go-eun filmed their first scene together at the Gwanghwamun Square, Seoul. The temple scenes, showing Lee Jung-jin painting, were shot at Saseongam Temple located in Mt. Osan, Gurye. The Busan train station which is shown in Kingdom of Corea is not the real Busan Station, instead it was filmed at Yeosu Exposition after the production team changed the labeling of the building.

The rowing competition scene was filmed at Misari Regatta, a boat racing track and park in Hanam, Gyeonggi Province, about 20 km east of Seoul, which had been constructed for the 1986 Asian Games and the 1988 Summer Olympics. The scene where Lee Min-ho chases after the 'white rabbit' barefoot was filmed at Busan Exhibition and Convention Center (BEXCO). Horse-riding scenes were filmed at Mungwang Reservoir, Goesan and Dadaepo Beach, Busan. Scenes were also shot at Sono Felice Vivaldi Park Equestrian Club.

One of the major filming locations of the series is the bamboo forest, where the door to either of the two worlds is located. The related scenes were shot at Ahopsan Bamboo forest, Busan. Some scenes were filmed at Taepyeong Salt Farm in Jeungdo Island in Sinan. An autumn-themed park scene was filmed at Jungri Sports Park, Daegu. Scenes were also filmed at Woljeonggyo Bridge located in the city of Gyeongju, one of the most popular touristic cities of the country for its cultural heritage. A scene where Lee Min-ho attends a funeral in episode 4 was filmed at Our Lady of Lourdes Cathedral, Daegu, a Catholic Cathedral in Gyesan in the city of Daegu which was built in 1902. Some scenes of the series were shot in Munsan Cathedral Complex in Jinju. Scenes were also filmed at Busan National Gugak Center and Chungmu Traditional Market.

=== Original soundtrack ===
The King: Eternal Monarch OST

Soundtrack album by Various Artists
- Released: June 12, 2020
- Genre: Soundtrack
- Languages: Korean; English
- Labels: Hwa&Dam Pictures; Genie; Stone

The original soundtrack features popular artists such as Hwasa, Davichi, and Gummy, along with songwriter Gaemi, who produced music for 7 of the singles and penned lyrics for 4 out of the 13 singles featured in the series. The complete soundtrack album was released on June 12, 2020, on the same day as the airing of last episode.

Part 1 of the original soundtrack was released on April 18, 2020 with the single "I Just Want To Stay With You" by Zion.T, followed by the single "Orbit" by Mamamoo's Hwasa (Part 2), which was released the following day. At the end of the second week of airing, the singles, "Gravity" by Kim Jong-wan (Part 3) and "Maze" by Yongzoo (Part 4), were released at 6 pm KST, 4 hours prior to the episode's broadcast. The following week saw the release of "I Fall In Love" by Ha Sung-woon (Part 5) and "Please Don't Cry" by the duet Davichi (Part 6).

Initially, Part 12 and 13 were supposed to be released on May 29 and 30, but were pushed back because of the postponement of episode 14 from May 29 to May 30.

Original soundtrack (Part 1-13)

Part 1

Released on April 18, 2020
No.	Title	Lyrics	Music	Artist	Length
1.	"I Just Want To Stay With You"	DOKO; Son Jae-min	DOKO; Son Jae-min	Zion.T	3:28
2.	"I Just Want To Stay With You" (Inst.)		DOKO; Son Jae-min		3:28
Total length:					6:56

Part 2

Released on April 19, 2020
No.	Title	Lyrics	Music	Artist	Length
1.	"Orbit"	Park Woo-sang; Sora	Park Woo-sang	Hwasa (Mamamoo)	3:07
2.	"Orbit" (Inst.)		Park Woo-sang		3:07
Total length:					6:14

Part 3

Released on April 24, 2020
No.	Title	Lyrics	Music	Artist	Length
1.	"Gravity" (연)	Ra.L; Naomi	Gaemi	Kim Jong-wan (Nell)	3:12
2.	"Gravity" (Inst.)		Gaemi		3:12
Total length:					6:24

Part 4

Released on April 25, 2020
No.	Title	Lyrics	Music	Artist	Length
1.	"Maze"	Okya; Charles	Gaemi	Yongzoo	3:43
2.	"Maze" (Inst.)		Gaemi		3:43
Total length:					7:26

Part 5

Released on May 2, 2020
No.	Title	Lyrics	Music	Artist	Length
1.	"I Fall In Love"	Noheul; Gaemi	Noheul; KRAZY PARK	Ha Sung-woon (Hotshot)	3:50
2.	"I Fall In Love" (Inst.)		Noheul; KRAZY PARK		3:50
Total length:					7:40

Part 6

Released on May 3, 2020
No.	Title	Lyrics	Music	Artist	Length
1.	"Please Don't Cry"	Dinner Coat; Dong Woo-seok	Dinner Coat; Dong Woo-seok; Yoo Jung-hyun	Davichi	3:56
2.	"Please Don't Cry" (Inst.)		Dinner Coat; Dong Woo-seok; Yoo Jung-hyun		3:56
Total length:					7:52

Part 7

Released on May 9, 2020
No.	Title	Lyrics	Music	Artist	Length
1.	"You Can't Stop It From Blooming" (꽃이 피는 걸 막을 순 없어요)	DONNA	DONNA; CuzD	Sunwoo Jung-a	3:33
2.	"You Can't Stop It From Blooming" (Inst.)		DONNA; CuzD		3:33
Total length:					7:06

Part 8

Released on May 10, 2020
No.	Title	Lyrics	Music	Artist	Length
1.	"Dream"	Gaemi; Kim Se-jin; Paul Kim	Gaemi; Paul Kim	Paul Kim	4:03
2.	"Dream" (Inst.)		Gaemi; Paul Kim		4:03
Total length:					8:06

Part 9

Released on May 15, 2020
No.	Title	Lyrics	Music	Artist	Length
1.	"Heart Break"	Noh Sung-eun (Chansline); Gaeko; Gaemi	Gaemi; Hwang Chan-hee	Gaeko (Dynamic Duo); Kim Na-young	3:13
2.	"Heart Break" (Inst.)		Gaemi; Hwang Chan-hee		3:13

Part 10

Released on May 16, 2020
No.	Title	Lyrics	Music	Artist	Length
1.	"My Day is Full of You" (나의 하루는 다 너로 가득해)	Gaemi; Zico; Heo Sung-jin	Gaemi	Zico (Block B); Wendy (Red Velvet)	3:41
2.	"My Day is Full of You" (Inst.)		Gaemi		3:41
Total length:					7:22

Part 11

Released on May 23, 2020
No.	Title	Lyrics	Music	Artist	Length
1.	"My Love"	Hana	Gaemi	Gummy	4:19
2.	"My Love" (Inst.)		Gaemi		4:19
Total length:					8:38

Part 12

Released on May 30, 2020
No.	Title	Lyrics	Music	Artist	Length
1.	"The Night When Everyone Is Asleep" (모두 잠든 밤)	Taebongie; December 32nd; Llwyd	Taebongie; December 32nd	Hwang Chi-yeul	4:13
2.	"The Night When Everyone Is Asleep" (Inst.)		Taebongie; December 32nd		4:13
Total length:					8:26

Part 13

Released on June 6, 2020
No.	Title	Lyrics	Music	Artist	Length
1.	"You're My End and My Beginning" (너는 나의 시작이자 마지막이다)	Lim Han-byul	Lim Han-byul; Choo Dae-kwan (MonoTree); Gaemi	Lim Han-byul; Kim Jae-hwan	4:10
2.	"You're My End and My Beginning" (Inst.)		Lim Han-byul; Choo Dae-kwan (MonoTree); Gaemi		4:10
Total length:					8:20

OST Special Album

Disc 1:
No.	Title	Artist	Length
1.	"I Just Want To Stay With You"	Zion.T	3:28
2.	"Orbit"	Hwasa	3:06
3.	"Gravity"	Kim Jong-wan	3:09
4.	"Maze"	Yongzoo	3:43
5.	"I Fall In Love"	Ha Sung-woon	3:50
6.	"Please Don't Cry"	Davichi	3:55
7.	"You Can't Stop It From Blooming"	Sunwoo Jung-a	3:32
8.	"Dream"	Paul Kim	4:04
9.	"Heart Break"	Gaeko; Kim Na-young	3:11
10.	"My Day Is Full Of You"	Zico; Wendy	3:41
11.	"My Love"	Gummy	4:19
12.	"Quiet Night"	Hwang Chi-yeul	3:41
13.	"You're My End and My Beginning"	Lim Han-byul; Kim Jae-hwan	4:11

Disc 2:
No.	Title	Artist	Length
1.	"Title of The King"	Park Jung-hwan; Gaemi	0:52
2.	"The King"	Park Yun-seo	3:38
3.	"The Fantasia of Another Dimension"	Park Jung-hwan	2:00
4.	"Empire"	Lee Seong-gu	3:58
5.	"Another World"	Yoo Min-ho	3:28
6.	"The King Slayer"	Park Yun-seo	2:50
7.	"Imperial"	Park Mi-sun	2:55
8.	"Empire Theme"	Lee Seong-gu	3:22
9.	"Prime Minister"	Park Mi-sun	2:55
10.	"King's Story"	Park Jung-hwan; Gaemi	2:50
11.	"Into The Fantasy"	Park Jung-hwan	2:17
12.	"Not Dead"	Park Yun-seo	3:23
13.	"My Love and..."	Park Jung-hwan; Gaemi	2:56
14.	"Progress"	Lee Seong-gu	3:38
15.	"The Day"	Lee Geon-yeong; Gaemi	3:57
16.	"Where Has She Been?"	Park Jung-hwan	2:33
17.	"Hydrangea"	Lee Geon-yeong	3:19
18.	"Fury"	Park Jung-hwan	2:21
19.	"Hold On"	Park Yun-seo	3:18
20.	"Luna"	Lee Seong-gu	2:44
21.	"Parallel World"	Park Mi-sun	2:53
22.	"The War Is Over"	Park Jung-hwan; Gaemi	2:26

== Reception ==
=== Commercial performance ===
The series has maintained the No.1 spot on the weekly Wavve drama chart for eight consecutive weeks since its first airing, it also has ranked in the top 10 programs most talked about according to the results of a survey on internet reactions to TV programs in the first half of 2020 conducted by the government agency Korea Communications Commission measuring online posts, online comments, number of views on related video and news articles. Netflix 2020 year-end viewing lists revealed that The King: Eternal Monarch was the most popular Korean drama series in India, Malaysia, Philippines and Singapore and one of the top two in the U.S.

On August 6, Studio Dragon announced their financial performance over the second quarter with a record-breaking 135 million dollars in total sales, a 25.9% increase over the same period of time last year, accrediting the boost to license sales of works such as Crash Landing on You, The King: Eternal Monarch, and It's Okay to Not Be Okay, and according to Hancinema, "'The King: Eternal Monarch' likely deserves most of the credit, as it is the only one of these dramas to have aired entirely during the second quarter." Business Korea also reported, "Studio Dragon's TV series sales climbed 9.3% year-over-year on average amid the growing popularity of K-dramas, particularly The King: Eternal Monarch."

The BBQ Chicken brand advertised on the series reported the sale of 550,000 sets of its fried chicken in a month due to its appearance on the series.

=== Critical response ===
The King: Eternal Monarch received mixed reviews. The series was highly anticipated by fans before its premiere, as it served to be Lee Min-ho first comeback projected following his release from mandatory military service, and being written by screenwriter Kim Eun-sook.

The King: eternal monarch on netflix, yet another brilliantly imaginative Korean drama written by Kim Eun Suk, as well as Mr Sunshine, Goblin, Descendants of the sun etc, i'm totally addicted, why can't we make romantic dramas anymore, Koreans are the masters of it.

— Sebastian Roché, Twitter

Arab News praised the series commenting, "In a world of mainstream K-dramas filled with cliches and reoccurring themes, The King: Eternal Monarch stands unique and absolutely mind-blowing," while Sebastian Roché tweeted, praising the series. The Philippine Cosmopolitan reviewed it saying, "The drama was smart and ambitious. It's commendable that screenwriter Kim Eun-suk aspired to attract a wider audience by choosing to veer away from tried and tested drama tropes." Woo Do-hwan's performance as double characters was praised throughout the show's run.

Conversely, The Korean Herald wrote that the series failed to present adequate explanation of the parallel universe to the audience who complained of the similarity of the two different worlds, with cultural critic Ha Jae-geun describing, "The story unfolds at a relatively slow pace and the parallel world is too complex to understand. It's hard to find some clever, creative conversations and catchy soundtracks in 'The King'." William Schwartz from Hancinema commented on the directing saying, "The lack of coherent direction has also dampened enthusiasm for the drama," and expressed that, "Viewers have taken issue with the inconsistent intuitive intelligence shown by the main character .... particularly the unapologetic extent to which characters from the fantasy universe play on uncomfortable gender tropes," while Cinemaescapist stating, "Others may find themselves disappointed as the ensemble cast swim in a sea of cliche." The series was also criticized for the excessive use of product placement, with one episode featuring 7 product placement ads, which was seen as undermining the series's content and artistry.

==== Stock images and historical inaccuracy ====
Following its premiere, an online controversy erupted as Korean viewers noticed that the architecture of the fictional world of the Corean Empire resembled that of Japanese temples, in particular, the Japanese temple complex Tōdai-ji and the temple of Kōfuku-ji. As the series was aired during a time when Korean-Japanese relations were uneasy, the production team issued an apology and stated that the buildings in question would be corrected. As the series progressed into its sixth episode, another controversy occurred as the episode depicted a naval war between Japan and the Corean empire, where the viewers noticed that the Japanese warships had the design of present Korean warships. The producer admitted that the production team used open source and stock images as reference material for the Japanese fleet as they were restricted from filming overseas due to COVID-19 and that they should have consulted experts to review the material.

Another controversy also surfaced in the sixth episode about the image of the dragon in the royal robe and the crown of the King. According to the viewers, Emperor Lee Gon's golden crown was similar to crowns used in the Silla period and his royal robe with the image of the dragon was mainly used in the Joseon period, and though the series states that it is not set in any particular dynasty in Korea and is a fantasy, they considered this mistake as a massive mix-up.

==== Broadcast warnings ====
On May 14, the Korea Communications Standards Commission issued an advisory warning against the series for scenes that challenged gender equality after viewers complained that those scenes promote fixed gender stereotypes. The scenes in question featured the female prime minister saying, "Bras without wires can't support the chest," as well as the scene portraying a boat race where a female spectator said, "Men need to wear less and move around lots."

On the same day, the Korea Communications Standards Commission also issued a warning to the production when the advertising review subcommittee took issue with the indirect advertising seen in episodes 8, 9, and 12 stating that it violated article 47 of the broadcasting regulations.

=== Awards and nominations ===
Year	Award	Category	Nominee	Result	Ref.
2020	SBS Drama Awards	Top Excellence Award, Actor in a Miniseries Fantasy/Romance Drama	Lee Min-ho	Won	
2020	SBS Drama Awards	Top Excellence Award, Actress in a Miniseries Fantasy/Romance Drama	Kim Go-eun	Nominated	
2020	SBS Drama Awards	Excellence Award, Actor in a Miniseries Fantasy/Romance Drama	Lee Jung-jin	Nominated	
2020	SBS Drama Awards	Excellence Award, Actor in a Miniseries Fantasy/Romance Drama	Woo Do-hwan	Nominated	
2020	SBS Drama Awards	Excellence Award, Actress in a Miniseries Fantasy/Romance Drama	Jung Eun-chae	Nominated	
2020	SBS Drama Awards	Best Supporting Actress	Kim Yong-ji	Nominated	
2020	SBS Drama Awards	Best Couple Award	Lee Min-ho and Kim Go-eun	Nominated	

=== Viewership ===
At the time of airing, the series had the second highest premiere ratings on SBS's Friday-Saturday drama time slot, proceeded by Nokdu Flower, and the highest in 2020 when it premiered with a TV viewership rating of 11.4%, which went up to its highest recorded rating of 11.6% on the second episode. The rating hit its lowest at 5.2% on the 11th episode, hovered around the 6-8% viewership ratings on later episodes, and ending with a viewership rating of 8.1%. The series saw smaller domestic popularity compared to previous works by writer Kim Eun-sook. According to International Business Times, the development of the plot, the editing and the forced scenes were the reasons the series failed to increase its ratings, while The Korea Times in an interview with an anonymous drama production company official said that the low ratings can largely be attributed to rise of streaming platforms.

The King: Eternal Monarch : South Korea viewers per episode (millions)

Season	Episode number																Average
Season	1	2	3	4	5	6	7	8	9	10	11	12	13	14	15	16	Average
1	2.299	2.453	1.856	2.154	1.745	2.136	1.595	1.756	1.304	1.690	1.316	1.572	1.631	1.288	1.727	1.642	1.760

Source: Audience measurement performed nationwide by Nielsen Korea. (Note: Only the highest number between the two parts was used.)

Average TV viewership ratings
Ep.	Part	Original broadcast date	Average audience share		
Ep.	Part	Original broadcast date	Nielsen Korea		TNmS
Ep.	Part	Original broadcast date	Nationwide	Seoul	Nationwide
1	1 (Note: In order to circumvent Korean laws that prevent commercial breaks in the middle of an episode, what would previously have been aired as single 70-minute episodes are now being repackaged as two 35-minute episodes, with two episodes being shown each night with a commercial break between the two.)	April 17, 2020	10.1% (7th)	11.4% (5th)	9.2% (12th)
1	2	April 17, 2020	11.4% (4th)	12.9% (4th)	9.9% (7th)
2	1	April 18, 2020	8.4% (7th)	9.7% (5th)	6.8% (17th)
2	2	April 18, 2020	11.6% (3rd)	12.9% (3rd)	9.3% (5th)
3	1	April 24, 2020	7.8% (11th)	8.2% (12th)	8.1% (12th)
3	2	April 24, 2020	9.0% (7th)	9.4% (5th)	8.9% (9th)
4	1	April 25, 2020	8.0% (9th)	8.8% (6th)	7.3% (16th)
4	2	April 25, 2020	9.7% (4th)	10.1% (4th)	9.5% (6th)
5	1	May 1, 2020	7.6% (11th)	8.2% (6th)	6.2% (14th)
5	2	May 1, 2020	8.6% (6th)	9.3% (4th)	8.0% (8th)
6	1	May 2, 2020	7.4% (8th)	7.9% (6th)	6.4% (15th)
6	2	May 2, 2020	10.3% (4th)	10.5% (3rd)	8.5% (6th)
7	1	May 8, 2020	7.0% (11th)	7.3% (10th)	6.4% (16th)
7	2	May 8, 2020	8.1% (7th)	8.7% (7th)	6.9% (13th)
8	1	May 9, 2020	6.1% (17th)	6.8% (13th)	—N/a
8	2	May 9, 2020	8.1% (9th)	8.5% (5th)	—N/a
9	1	May 15, 2020	5.8% (17th)	6.3% (15th)	—N/a
9	2	May 15, 2020	6.3% (14th)	7.0% (13th)	5.8% (18th)
10	1	May 16, 2020	6.4% (16th)	7.3% (10th)	—N/a
10	2	May 16, 2020	7.8% (8th)	8.7% (5th)	7.3% (16th)
11	1	May 22, 2020	5.2% (20th)	5.6% (19th)	—N/a
11	2	May 22, 2020	6.6% (12th)	6.8% (11th)	6.6% (14th)
12	1	May 23, 2020	6.1% (15th)	6.6% (13th)	—N/a
12	2	May 23, 2020	8.1% (6th)	8.5% (5th)	8.6% (5th)
13	1	May 30, 2020 (Note: The telecast of episode 13, which was initially set to air on May 29, was postponed and rescheduled to air on Saturday, May 30, at 10 p.m. KST for the broadcast of the 2011 American thriller film, Contagion. The broadcasting channel revealed that this special arrangement was made in hopes of increasing the safety awareness of people in the country about novel coronavirus pandemic. The decision was made on May 28, 2020 in the view of the rapid increase in newly confirmed COVID-19 cases in South Korea during the previous two days.)	5.6% (NR)	—N/a	—N/a
13	2	May 30, 2020	7.7% (8th)	8.2% (8th)	8.2% (9th)
14	1	June 5, 2020	5.7% (15th)	6.5% (12th)	—N/a
14	2	June 5, 2020	6.7% (11th)	7.5% (10th)	6.1% (11th)
15	1	June 6, 2020	5.9% (16th)	6.8% (11th)	5.8% (19th)
15	2	June 6, 2020	8.1% (7th)	8.5% (7th)	7.2% (14th)
16	1	June 12, 2020	5.8% (14th)	6.2% (12th)	5.5% (17th)
16	2	June 12, 2020	8.1% (8th)	8.7% (6th)	7.2% (11th)
Average			7.7%	8.4%	— (Note: Due to some ratings not recorded, the exact average rating is unknown.)
In the table above, the blue numbers represent the lowest ratings and the red numbers represent the highest ratings.; NR denotes that the series did not rank in the top 20 daily programs on that date.; N/A denotes that the rating is not known.

== See Also ==
- Princess Hours - Another Korean TV show with a somewhat similar premise, including also an alternate reality involving the Korean monarchy still surviving as a ruling dynasty in modern times.
