= Story & Pictures Media =

South Korean TV series production company

- Type: Small and medium-sized enterprises
- Industry: Production company
- Genre: Korean drama
- Founded: January 3, 2017; 9 years ago in Seoul, South Korea
- Founder: Hwang Jee-woo
- Headquarters: 4/F TUBAn Building, 1 Gyeonghuigung 1-gil, Sajik-dong, Jongno District, Seoul, South Korea
- Key people: Hwang Jee-woo
- Services: TV series production
- Parent: Kakao Entertainment

Korean name
- Hangul: 글앤그림미디어
- RR: Geul aen geurim midieo
- MR: Kŭl aen kŭrim midiŏ

Story & Pictures Media (Korean: 글앤그림미디어) is a South Korean TV series production company, founded in 2017 by former AStory producer Hwang Jee-woo. As of 2021, it is a subsidiary of Kakao Entertainment.

== Managed people ==
- Joo Hwa-mi (co-managed by CAMP ENT)
- Jung Hyun-jung
- Jung Yoon-jung
- Kang Eun-kyung (co-managed by CAMP ENT)
- Kim Bo-hyun
- Jane "Je In" Kim (co-managed by CAMP ENT)
- Kim Min-seo
- Kwon Eum-mi
- Lee Ji-min
- Lee Sung-eun
- Ma Jin-won

== Works ==
Year	Title	Original title	Network	Notes	Ref.
2018	Misty	미스티	JTBC		
2019	Romance Is a Bonus Book	로맨스는 별책부록	tvN	developed by Studio Dragon	
2020	The Spies Who Loved Me	나를 사랑한 스파이	MBC TV		
2020	Lovestruck in the City	도시남녀의 사랑법	KakaoTV; Netflix	digital drama developed by Kakao M	
2023	Our Blooming Youth	청춘이여 월담하라	tvN	developed by Studio Dragon	
2023	Gyeongseong Creature	경성크리처	tvN		
2024	The Atypical Family	히어로는 아닙니다만	JTBC	Co-production with Drama House Studio and SLL	
TBA	Killer Queen	킬러 퀸	TV Chosun		
TBA	A Bitch and a Punk (literal title)	연놈	TBA	with Semicolon Studio	
