= Kang Ki-doong =

South Korean film actor

- Kang in 2016
- Born: March 25, 1987 (age 39); Jeju, South Korea
- Education: Korea National University of Arts – Theater Department of Acting / Art History
- Occupation: Actor
- Years active: 2008–present
- Agent: Hunus Entertainment
- Spouse: Unknown (m. 2024)

Korean name
- Hangul: 강기둥
- RR: Gang Gidung
- MR: Kang Kidung

Kang Ki-doong (Korean: 강기둥; born March 25, 1987) is a South Korean actor. He appeared in numerous television series, including Fight for My Way (2017), Prison Playbook (2019), It's Okay to Not Be Okay (2020), Reborn Rich (2022), and The First Responders (2022–2023).

== Personal life ==
On August 16, 2024, Hunus Entertainment confirmed that Kang would marry his non-celebrity girlfriend in September. The couple married on September 21, 2024, in a private ceremony on Jeju Island.

== Filmography ==
Key
†	Denotes films that have not yet been released

=== Film ===
Year	Title	Role	Notes	Ref.
2011	The Cat	Rescue Staff #2		
2013	Fatal	Se-woon		
2013	Neverdie Butterfly	Jong-soo		
2019	Guy with Potential for Success	Jin-sik		
2024	Handsome Guys	Byeong-jo		

=== Television series ===
Year	Title	Role	Notes	Ref.
2016	The Good Wife	Shi-yeon's boyfriend		
2016	Love in the Moonlight	Dalbong		
2017	Tomorrow, with You	Kang Ki-doong		
2017	Fight for My Way	Jang Kyung-koo		
2017	Prison Playbook	Prison Officer Song		
2018	About Time	Park Woo-jin		
2019	Romance Is a Bonus Book	Park Hoon		
2019	Melting Me Softly	Ma Don-sik (1999)		
2020	The King: Eternal Monarch	Secretary Kim		
2020	It's Okay to Not Be Okay	Jo Jae-soo		
2022	Our Beloved Summer	Jin-seop	Cameo (episode 14)	
2022	Shooting Stars	Dong-jun	Cameo (episode 3)	
2022	Reborn Rich	Jin Hyeong-jun		
2022–2023	The First Responders	Gongmyung Pil	Season 1–2	
2023	King the Land	Choi Tae-man	Cameo (episode 1)	
2025	Surely Tomorrow	Cha Woo-sik		
2026	See You at Work Tomorrow! †	Jeon Ki-tae		

=== Web series ===
Year	Title	Role	Notes	Ref.
2021	The Witch's Diner	Bae Yoon-ki	Cameo	

=== Drama special ===
Year	Title	Role	Network	Ref.
2019	Tow Truck	Jo Jung-sam	KBS2	

== Theater ==
Year	English title	Korean title	Role	Ref.
2022	Showman	이하 ‘쇼맨	Nebula	
2022–2023	On the Beat	온 더 비트	Adrien	

== Awards and nominations ==
Name of the award ceremony, year presented, category, nominee of the award, and the result of the nomination
Award ceremony	Year	Category	Nominee / Work	Result	Ref.
SBS Drama Awards	2022	Best Supporting Actor in a Miniseries Genre/Fantasy Drama	The First Responders	Won	
Scene Stealer Festival	2023	Main Prize (Bonsang)	Reborn Rich; The First Responders	Won	
