= Tomorrow, with You =

2017 South Korean television series

- Promotional poster
- Also known as: With You
- Hangul: 내일 그대와
- RR: Naeil geudaewa
- MR: Naeil kŭdaewa
- Genre: Fantasy; Romance
- Created by: Studio Dragon; Choi Jin-hee
- Written by: Heo Sung-Hye
- Directed by: Yoo Je-won
- Starring: Shin Min-a; Lee Je-hoon
- Country of origin: South Korea
- Original language: Korean
- No. of episodes: 16

Production
- Executive producers: Kim Young-kyu; Park Jae-sam
- Producer: Cho Moon-joo
- Camera setup: Single-camera
- Running time: 60 min
- Production companies: Celltrion Entertainment (formerly Dream E&M)

Original release
- Network: tvN
- Release: February 3 – March 25, 2017

Tomorrow, with You (Korean: 내일 그대와; RR: Naeil geudaewa) is a 2017 South Korean television series starring Shin Min-a and Lee Je-hoon. From February 3, 2017 to March 25, 2017 it aired on cable channel tvN every Friday and Saturday at 20:00 (KST).

== Synopsis ==
The story revolves around Yoo So-joon (Lee Je-hoon), a CEO of a real estate company, who has the ability to travel through time via a subway; and his wife, Song Ma-rin (Shin Min-a), who works as an amateur photographer. So-joon foresees his future-self die so he decides to marry Ma-rin in order to avoid that fate. As time passes, he learns to love her selflessly.

== Cast ==
=== Main ===
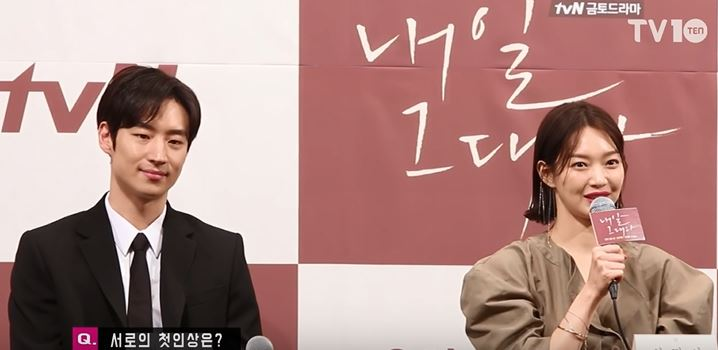
Lee and Shin at the press conference of the series

Actor	Character	Role
Shin Min-a	Song Ma-rin	ex-child TV star Bap-Soon (catch phrase "give me rice"), photographer
Lee Je-hoon	Yoo So-joon	time traveller, Myreits real estate CEO

=== Ma-rin's friends and associates ===
Actor	Character	Role
Lee Jung-eun	Cha Boo-sim	Ma-rin's mother
Lee Bong-ryun	Oh Soo-ri	Ma-rin's best friend, runs piano academy
Kim Ye-won	Lee Gun-sok	Ma-rin's friend who marries Kim Young-jin
Lee Ah-rin	Shin-bi	Fashion studio president
Yoon Sa-bong	Mi-soo	Psychic, Fortune Teller (episode 10)
Ha Yoon-kyung		Lee Gun-sok bridesmaid (episode 1, 6,11)

=== Myreits - real estate employees and investors ===
Actor	Character	Role
Kang Ki-doong	Kang Ki-doong	So-Joon's right-hand man and best friend
Baek Hyun-jin	Kim Young-jin	Myreits director, marries Lee Gun-sok
Chae Dong-hyun	Hwang Bi-seo	Kim Young-jin's Secretary
Shim Wan-joon	Kang So-jang	Myreits director
Kim Seung-hoon	Hwang Sang-moo	Myreits director
Jo Han-chul	Doo-sik	Time traveller, teaches So-joon how to time travel

=== Happiness Construction Employees ===
Habitat for Humanity knockoff even using the habitat logo

Park Joo-hee	Shin Se-young	So-joon's child hood friend, Happiness home builder
Oh Kwang-rok	Shin Sung-gyoo	Se-young's father, Director of Happiness Construction

== Production ==
The drama was written by Heo Sung-hye (All About My Wife) and directed by Yoo Je-won (Oh My Ghostess, High School King of Savvy). The first script-reading was held on August 29, 2016 in Sangam-dong, Seoul, South Korea and filming began on September 5, 2016.

== Original soundtrack ==
=== Part 1 ===
No.	Title	Artist	Length
1.	"Flower" (꽃)	Seo In-guk	3:49
2.	"Flower" (꽃 (Inst.))		3:49
Total length:			7:38

=== Part 2 ===
No.	Title	Artist	Length
1.	"Tomorrow With You" (내일 그대와)	Kim Feel	4:05
2.	"Tomorrow With You" (내일 그대와 (Inst.))		4:05
Total length:			8:10

=== Part 3 ===
No.	Title	Artist	Length
1.	"Relieved" (참 다행이야)	Lee Sera	4:47
2.	"Relieved" (참 다행이야 (Inst.))		4:47
Total length:			9:34

=== OST ===
No.	Title	Artist	Length
1.	"Flower" (꽃)	Seo In-guk	3:49
2.	"Tomorrow With You" (내일 그대와)	Kim Feel	4:05
3.	"Relieved" (참 다행이야)	Lee Sera	4:47
4.	"Tomorrow With You Main Title" (내일 그대와 Main Title)	Im Ha Yeong	0:50
5.	"Destiny" (인연)	Im Seung Bum	2:57
6.	"Into The Time" (시간여행)	Im Ha Yeong	2:30
7.	"Throbbing" (덕방이 주의보)	Yoo Jung Hyun	2:42
8.	"Time Difference" (시차부적응)	Yoo Jung Hyun	2:19
9.	"Propose Blues" (환청블루스)	Yoo Jung Hyun	3:06
10.	"Weddingdress in the Rain" (우산 속 웨딩 드레스)	Yoo Jung Hyun	3:02
11.	"Honeymoon" (꿀달)	Yoo Jung Hyun	2:24
12.	"Hidden Time" (감춰진 시간)	Im Ha Yeong	2:10
13.	"Yesterday" (어제)	Im Ha Yeong	4:16
14.	"Today" (오늘)	Im Ha Yeong	3:28
15.	"Tomorrow" (내일)	Im Ha Yeong	2:35
16.	"Last Duel" (마지막 결투)	Im Ha Yeong	6:12
17.	"Time Hole"	Im Ha Yeong	2:05
Total length:			53:17

=== Charted songs ===
Title	Year	Peak positions	Sales	Remarks
Title	Year	KOR	Sales	Remarks
"Flower" (꽃) (Seo In-guk)	2017	68	KOR: 42,857+	Part 1
"Tomorrow With You" (내일 그대와) (Kim Feel)	2017	68	KOR: 44,573+	Part 2
"—" denotes releases that did not chart or were not released in that region.

== Ratings ==
In this table, the blue numbers represent the lowest ratings and the red numbers represent the highest ratings.

Ep.	Original broadcast date	Average audience share (Nationwide)	
Ep.	Original broadcast date	AGB Nielsen	TNmS
1	February 3, 2017	3.857%	3.9%
2	February 4, 2017	3.085%	3.1%
3	February 10, 2017	2.701%	3.2%
4	February 11, 2017	1.148%	1.0%
5	February 17, 2017	1.034%	1.4%
6	February 18, 2017	1.568%	1.9%
7	February 24, 2017	1.635%	1.8%
8	February 25, 2017	1.122%	1.5%
9	March 3, 2017	1.158%	1.6%
10	March 4, 2017	1.518%	1.8%
11	March 10, 2017	0.868%	1.3%
12	March 11, 2017	1.081%	1.5%
13	March 17, 2017	1.022%	1.3%
14	March 18, 2017	1.094%	1.5%
15	March 24, 2017	0.943%	1.05%
16	March 25, 2017	1.822%	2.4%
Average		1.728%	1.9%

This series aired on a cable channel/pay TV which normally has a relatively smaller audience compared to free-to-air TV/public broadcasters (KBS, SBS, MBC and EBS).
