= Studio Dragon =

South Korean TV series production company

Studio Dragon Corporation
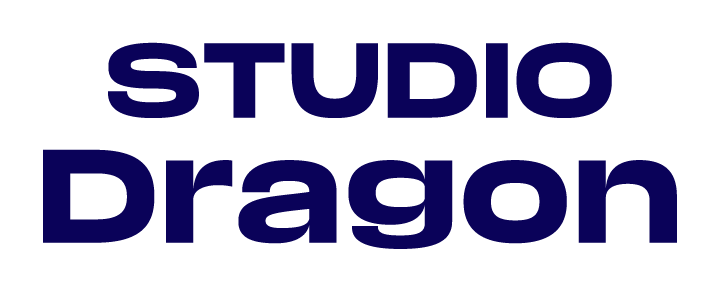
- Logo since 2022
- Native name: 스튜디오드래곤 주식회사
- Type: Public
- Traded as: KRX: 253450; KOSDAQ Component
- Industry: Drama series
- Predecessor: CJ E&M Drama Division
- Founded: May 3, 2016; 10 years ago in Seoul, South Korea
- Founder: CJ E&M
- Headquarters: Unit 1701, 17th Floor, Dong-A Digital Media Center (DDMC), Maebongsan-ro 75, Sangam-dong, Mapo-gu, Seoul, South Korea
- Area served: Worldwide
- Key people: Jang Kyung-ik (president and CEO)
- Services: drama production and distribution
- Total equity: 11 billion won (2016)
- Owner: (Note: As of June 2022.): CJ ENM Co., Ltd.: 54.46%; Naver Corporation: 6.25%; Netflix Worldwide Production, LLC: 4.68%; Fidelity Management & Research Co. LLC: 2.42%; PineBridge Investments Asia Ltd.: 1.14%; Samsung Asset Management Co., Ltd.: 0.90%; Norges Bank Investment Management: 0.89%; The Vanguard Group, Inc.: 0.64%; Kim Sun-jung: 0.35%; JPMorgan Asset Management (Asia Pacific) Ltd.: 0.29%; Dimensional Fund Advisors, L.P.: 0.19%; Other shareholders (including public stock): 27.79%
- Number of employees: 166, as of June 2022
- Parent: CJ ENM Entertainment Division
- Subsidiaries: Culture Depot; Hwa&Dam Pictures; KPJ Corporation; GTist Co., Ltd.; Gill Pictures Co., Ltd.
- Website: www.studiodragon.net

Studio Dragon Corporation (Korean: 스튜디오드래곤 주식회사) is a South Korean drama production, marketing and distribution company under CJ ENM Entertainment Division. It was established on May 3, 2016, as a spin-off from E&M's drama division. In 2018, Studio Dragon became a subsidiary of CJ ENM after their previous parent company, CJ E&M, was merged into CJ ENM.

The company joined the KOSDAQ index of the Korea Exchange, the same index where its parent company is listed, through an initial public offering on November 24, 2017.

Studio Dragon has partnered with Netflix to carry numerous TVN dramas like Crash Landing on You and It's Okay to Not Be Okay on the platform. Their partnership was expected to expire in 2022 as CJ ENM, founder of Studio Dragon, has decided to focus on TVING following the merger with KT Seezn, which also owned minority shares on KT StudioGenie, who founded the streaming platform Seezn.

== Logo ==
Studio Dragon's logo, which it calls the Drama Paragon, was inspired by Cintamani, a wish-fulfilling jewel within both Hindu and Buddhist traditions. It represents Asian culture, which the company wants to glorify through every production it makes. The logo, made by Korean brand design company Brandmajor, was first introduced in the 2016 drama Squad 38.

== Related companies ==
=== Subsidiaries ===
- Culture Depot (CEO: Jang Jin-wook)
- GT:st (CEO: Lee Dong-goo)
- Gill Pictures (CEO Park Min-yeop)
- Hwa&Dam Pictures (CEO: Yoon Ha-rim)
- KPJ Corporation (CEO: Jang Jin-wook)
- Merrycow (Founder: Song Jae-jeong)
- Movierock (CEO Kim Jae-joong)
- Next Scene (Cofounder: Park Shin-woo and Oh Chung-hwan)

=== Joint ventures ===
- Mega Monster (with Kakao M) (CEO: Lee Jun-ho) (Note: Founded in 2014 as Story Plant and acquired by Studio Dragon's parent company in 2015, then sold to Kakao M (formerly Loen Entertainment) in 2017. Studio Dragon is the third biggest stakeholder in the company with a 10.95% stake, behind kakao M's 67.20% and the latter's sister company KakaoPage's 21.85%. As of September 1, 2018, the company is still listed under its former name on the "related companies" section on Studio Dragon's website.)
- Studio Dragon Japan (with Line Digital Frontier)

=== Affiliate companies ===
- AStory (CEO: Lee Sang-baek)
- JS Pictures (CEO: Lee Jin-suk) (Note: JS Pictures is currently a separate subsidiary of CJ ENM, but is listed as an affiliate of Studio Dragon on the latter's website.)

== Partner entities ==
Current partners

- Amazon
- Netflix
- TBS Television
- Warner Bros. Discovery

Former partners

- LOEN Entertainment
- Paramount Skydance
- Paramount Global (until 2025)
- Skydance Media (until 2025)
- AMC Networks
- ITV
- Lazada Group
- DramaFever (until 2018)

== Special projects ==
- O'pen (with CJ ENM, CJ Entertainment, and CJ Cultural Foundation)

== Production works ==
=== As production company ===
Year	Title	Network	Associated Production	Ref.
2016	Shuttle Love Millennium	Hunan TV	Hunan TV; EE-Media	
2016	Another Miss Oh	tvN	Chorokbaem Media	
2016	Dear My Friends	tvN	GT Entertainment	
2016	Squad 38	OCN	S.M. C&C	
2016	The Good Wife	tvN		
2016	On the Way to the Airport	KBS2		
2016	Woman with a Suitcase	MBC TV		
2016	Entourage	tvN		
2016	The Legend of the Blue Sea	SBS TV	Culture Depot	
2017	Circle	tvN	tvN; KPJ Corporation	
2017	My Golden Life	KBS2		
2017	Bravo My Life	SBS TV	Hwa&Dam Pictures	
2017	Drama Stage	tvN		
2018	Children of a Lesser God	OCN	KPJ Corporation	
2018	The Guest	OCN		
2018	The Smile Has Left Your Eyes	tvN	Fuji Television; The Unicorn	
2018	Dear My Room	Olive	Studio 605	
2019	Love Alarm	Netflix	Hidden Sequence; Netflix Services Korea	
2019	Touch Your Heart	tvN	Mega Monster; Zium Content	
2019	Arthdal Chronicles	tvN	KPJ Corporation	
2019	Doctor John	SBS TV	KPJ Corporation	
2019	Watcher	OCN		
2019	The Lies Within	OCN		
2019	Crash Landing on You	tvN	Culture Depot	
2020	Once Again	KBS2	Bon Factory Worldwide	
2020	My Holo Love	Netflix	Netflix Services Korea	
2020	Sweet Home	Netflix	Studio N	
2020	The King: Eternal Monarch	SBS TV	Hwa&Dam Pictures	
2020	My Unfamiliar Family	tvN		
2021	Navillera	tvN	The Great Show	
2021	Kingdom: Ashin of the North	Netflix	BA Entertainment; Baram Pictures	
2021	Doom at Your Service	tvN	Studio&NEW	
2021	Hometown Cha-Cha-Cha	tvN	GTist	
2021	The Devil Judge	tvN	Studio&NEW	
2021	Happiness	tvN		
2021	Secret Royal Inspector & Joy	tvN	Mongjakso	
2021	Bad and Crazy	tvN	Mink Entertainment	
2022	Ghost Doctor	tvN	Bon Factory Worldwide	
2022	Twenty-Five Twenty-One	tvN	Hwa&Dam Pictures	
2022	Our Blues	tvN	GTist	
2022	Alchemy of Souls	tvN	High Quality (Part 1); TS Narincinema (Part 2)	
2022	Little Women	tvN		
2022	Behind Every Star	tvN	Baram Pictures	
2022	Big Mouth	MBC TV	AStory; A-Man Project	
2022	Start-Up PH	GMA Network	GMA Entertainment Group	
2022	Connect	Disney+	Lee'z Film; Studio HIM	
2022	Island	TVING	YLab; Gilstory Ent	
2023	Pandora: Beneath the Paradise	tvN	Chorokbaem Media	
2023	Lies Hidden in My Garden	ENA	KT Studio Genie; Film Dorothy	
2023	Celebrity	Netflix	Kim Jong-hak Production; How Pictures	
2023	Doona!	Netflix	Show Runners; Studio N	
2023	The Big Door Prize	Apple TV+	Skydance Television	
2023–2024	Gyeongseong Creature	Netflix	Story & Pictures Media; Kakao Entertainment	
2024	Queen of Tears	tvN	Culture Depot; Showrunners	
2024	The Midnight Romance in Hagwon	tvN	JS Pictures	
2024	Hierarchy	Netflix		
2024	The Whirlwind	Netflix	Pan Entertainment	
2024	Love Next Door	tvN	The Modori; Showrunners	
2024	Dear Hyeri	ENA	Studio Him	
2024	Dongjae, the Good or the Bastard	TVING	Ace Factory	
2024	Love Your Enemy	tvN	Blitzway Studio	
2025	Dear Hongrang	Netflix	Acemaker Movieworks; H House; EO Contents Group	
2025	Head over Heels	tvN	Dexter Pictures; EO Contents Group	
2025	Genie, Make a Wish	Netflix	Hwa&Dam Pictures	
2025	Nice to Not Meet You	tvN	Studio&NEW; Artist Company	
2025	The Price of Confession	Netflix	Production H	
2026	To My Beloved Thief	KBS2		
2026	Undercover Miss Hong	tvN	Celltrion Entertainment	
2026	Siren's Kiss	tvN	Cape E&A	
2026	Gold Land	Hulu (Disney+)	Lee-Chang films	
2026	My Royal Nemesis	SBS TV	Studio S; Gill Pictures	
2026	Fifties Professionals	MBC TV	Jumbo Film	
2026	The Legend of Kitchen Soldier	TVING	Studio N	
2026	See You at Work Tomorrow!	tvN	Kross Pictures	
2026	Four Hands, Two Sonatas	tvN	Studio N; Namoo Actors	
2026	Doctor X: Mafia in White	SBS TV	Studio S; HighZium Studio	
2026	Happy Anding	tvN		
2026	The Substitute	TVING	Sidus; Studio Wooyoungwoo	
2026	Tantara	Netflix	GTist	
TBA	Soul	TBA	Studio AA; Culture Depot; Baram Pictures; Imaginus	

=== As planner/creator/developer ===
Year	Title	Network	Production Companies	Ref.
2016	Bring It On, Ghost	tvN	Creative Leaders Group 8; The Unicorn	
2016	Cinderella with Four Knights	tvN	HB Entertainment	
2016	The K2	tvN	HB Entertainment	
2016	Guardian: The Lonely and Great God	tvN	Hwa&Dam Pictures	
2017	Voice	OCN	Content K	
2017	Introverted Boss	tvN	KBS Media; Introverted Boss SPC	
2017	Tomorrow, with You	tvN	Celltrion Entertainment	
2017	The Liar and His Lover	tvN	Bon Factory Worldwide	
2017	Tunnel	OCN	The Unicorn	
2017	Chicago Typewriter	tvN	The Unicorn	
2017	Duel	OCN	Chorokbaem Media	
2017	Stranger	tvN	Signal Entertainment Group; IOK Media	
2017	The Bride of Habaek	tvN	Number Three Pictures	
2017	Criminal Minds	tvN	Taewon Entertainment	
2017	Save Me	OCN	Hidden Sequence	
2017	Live Up to Your Name	tvN	Bon Factory Worldwide	
2017	Argon	tvN	Daydream Entertainment	
2017	Black	OCN	iWill Media	
2017	Bad Guys 2	OCN	Urban Works Media	
2017	Avengers Social Club	tvN	JS Pictures	
2017	A Korean Odyssey	tvN	JS Pictures	
2017	Revolutionary Love	tvN	Samhwa Networks	
2017	Because This Is My First Life	tvN	MI Inc.	
2017	The Most Beautiful Goodbye	tvN	GTist	
2018	Mother	tvN	The Unicorn	
2018	Cross	tvN	Logos Film	
2018	Live	tvN	GTist	
2018	My Mister	tvN	Chorokbaem Media	
2018	Lawless Lawyer	tvN	Logos Film	
2018	About Time	tvN	Story TV	
2018	Mistress	OCN	Chorokbaem Media	
2018	What's Wrong with Secretary Kim	tvN	Bon Factory Worldwide	
2018	Life on Mars	OCN	Production H	
2018	Mr. Sunshine	tvN	Hwa&Dam Pictures	
2018	Familiar Wife	tvN	Chorokbaem Media	
2018	Voice 2	OCN	Content K	
2018	Room No. 9	tvN	Kim Jong-hak Production	
2018	100 Days My Prince	tvN	AStory	
2018	Player	OCN	iWill Media	
2018	Mama Fairy and the Woodcutter	tvN	JS Pictures	
2018	Memories of the Alhambra	tvN	Chorokbaem Media	
2018	Encounter	tvN	Bon Factory Worldwide	
2018	Priest	OCN	Crave Works	
2018	Quiz of God: Reboot	OCN	Curo Holdings; Eight Works	
2019	Abyss	tvN	Neo Entertainment	
2019	Romance Is a Bonus Book	tvN	Story & Pictures Media	
2019	He Is Psychometric	tvN	JS Pictures	
2019	The Crowned Clown	tvN	GTist	
2019	Confession	tvN	Ace Factory	
2019	Designated Survivor: 60 Days	tvN	DK E&M	
2019	Her Private Life	tvN	Bon Factory Worldwide	
2019	Hotel del Luna	tvN	GTist	
2019	The Great Show	tvN	Huayi Brothers; Lotte Cultureworks	
2019	Miss Lee	tvN	Logos Film	
2019	Melting Me Softly	tvN	Story Phoenix	
2019	Search: WWW	tvN	Hwa&Dam Pictures	
2019	Crash Landing on You	tvN	Culture Depot	
2019	Catch the Ghost	tvN	Logos Film	
2019	Psychopath Diary	tvN	KeyEast	
2019	Black Dog: Being A Teacher	tvN	Urban Works	
2019	Possessed	OCN	Daydream Entertainment	
2019	Kill It	OCN	Crave Works	
2019	Voice 3	OCN	Content K	
2019	Save Me 2	OCN	Hidden Sequence	
2019	Class of Lies	OCN	JS Pictures	
2019	The Running Mates: Human Rights	OCN	Daydream Entertainment	
2020	Money Game	tvN	JS Pictures	
2020	Hi Bye, Mama!	tvN	MI Inc.	
2020	A Piece of Your Mind	tvN	The Unicorn; Movie Rock	
2020	The Cursed	tvN	Lezhin Studio	
2020	Record of Youth	tvN	Pan Entertainment	
2020	Flower of Evil	tvN	Monster Union	
2020	Oh My Baby	tvN	Studio&NEW	
2020	Stranger (season 2)	tvN	Ace Factory	
2020	Memorist	tvN	Studio 605	
2020	When My Love Blooms	tvN	Bon Factory Worldwide	
2020	True Beauty	tvN	Bon Factory Worldwide; Studio N	
2020	It's Okay to Not Be Okay	tvN	Story TV; Goldmedalist	
2020	Tale of the Nine Tailed	tvN	How Pictures	
2020	Start-Up	tvN	History D&C	
2020	Awaken	tvN	Kim Jong-hak Production; Story Vine Pictures	
2020	Mr. Queen	tvN	Crave Works; YG Studioplex	
2020	Rugal	OCN	Lian Entertainment	
2020	Tell Me What You Saw	OCN	H House	
2020	Train	OCN	Doframe	
2020	Missing: The Other Side	OCN	MAYS Entertainment	
2020	The Uncanny Counter	OCN	Neo Entertainment	
2021	L.U.C.A.: The Beginning	tvN	H House; Take One Company	
2021	Jirisan	tvN	AStory; Baram Pictures	
2021	Vincenzo	tvN	Logos Film	
2021	My Roommate Is a Gumiho	tvN	Drama House; JTBC Studios; Zium Content	
2021	Mine	tvN	JS Pictures	
2021	Times	OCN	Story Hunter	
2021	Hometown	tvN	C-JeS Entertainment	
2021	Voice 4	tvN	Story & Pictures Media	
2021	The Road: The Tragedy of One	tvN	The Great Show	
2022	A Superior Day	OCN	iWill Media	
2022	Under the Queen's Umbrella	tvN	How Pictures	
2023	My Lovely Liar	tvN	Big Ocean ENM; Supermoon Pictures	
2023	Twinkling Watermelon	tvN	Pan Entertainment	
2023	Song of the Bandits	Netflix	Urban Works Media; Baram Pictures	
2023	A Bloody Lucky Day	TVING	Paramount Global; The Great Show; Studio N	
2024	Wedding Impossible	tvN	Studio 329	
2024	The Auditors	tvN	Filcon Studio	
2025	When the Stars Gossip	tvN	KeyEast; MYM Entertainment	
2025	Study Group	TVING	Ylab Plex	
2025	My Dearest Nemesis	tvN	Studio N	
2025	Second Shot at Love	tvN	How Pictures	
2025	Our Unwritten Seoul	tvN	Monster Union; Higround; Next Scene	
2025	Love, Take Two	tvN	Showrunners	
2025	Bon Appétit, Your Majesty	tvN	Filmgrida; Jung Universe	
2025	Shin's Project	tvN	Twoframe	
2025	Typhoon Company	tvN	Imaginus; Studio PIC; Tree Studio	
2025	Dear X	TVING	Monster Union; Siwoo Company	
2025	Pro Bono	tvN	Sequence One; Lotte Cultureworks; Studio Flow	
2026	Our Universe	tvN	Syn&Studio	
2026	Mad Concrete Dreams	tvN	Mindmark; Studio 329	
2026	Filing for Love	tvN	Mindmark; The Modori	
2026	My Bias, My Boss	tvN	Studio N; Npio Entertainment	
2026	100 Days of Deception	tvN	Nangman Crew	
