= Asia Rainbow TV Awards =

Asian television awards

Asia Rainbow TV Awards is an Asian television awards ceremony held by Hong Kong Television Association and China Television Production Committee. The first ceremony was held in 2011, and the second ceremony was held in 2014.

Winners are given the "Best" award, and runners-up are given the "Outstanding" award.

== Categories ==
=== TV Drama ===
==== Programme ====
- Modern Drama
- Historical/Costume Drama
- Action Drama
- Comedy
- Inspiring Drama

==== Individual ====
- Leading Actor
- Leading Actress
- Supporting Actor
- Supporting Actress
- Comedy Actor
- Comedy Actress
- Director
- Scriptwriter
- Action Director
- Theme Song

=== Entertainment ===
==== Programme ====
- Variety Show
- Infotainment
- Game & Quiz Show

==== Individual ====
- Host
- Hostess

=== TV Documentary ===
==== Programme ====
- Nature and Environment
- Society and Culture

==== Individual ====
- Director
- Cinematography

=== TV Animation ===
==== Programme ====
- Animation

==== Individual ====
- Character Design
- Director

== TV Drama ==
=== Programme categories ===
| Year | Modern Drama | Historical Drama | Action Drama | Comedy | Inspiring Drama |
|---|---|---|---|---|---|
| 2011 | (China) A Beautiful Daughter-in-Law Era | (China) The Firmament of the Pleiades | (China) A Legend of Shaolin Kung Fu Heroes in Trouble | (Taiwan) Hi My Sweetheart | —N/a |
| 2014 | Best: (South Korea) The Heirs; Outstanding: (China) Beijing Youth; Outstanding: (South Korea) Secret Love | Best: (China) The Legend of Zhen Huan; Outstanding: (South Korea) Gu Family Book; Outstanding: (China) The Orphan of Zhao | Best: (Singapore) C.L.I.F. 2 Outstanding: (China) Little Heroes; Outstanding: (China) Chucky Monks | Best: (China) We Love You, Mr. Jin; Outstanding: (China) Return to the Blessed Village | Best: (China) Little Daddy; Outstanding: (Philippines) Bayan Ko (My Homeland); Outstanding: (China) Guard Your Life |

=== Individual categories ===
| Year | Leading Actor | Leading Actress | Supporting Actor | Supporting Actress | Comedy Actor | Comedy Actress |
|---|---|---|---|---|---|---|
| 2011 | (China) Chen Jianbin for Three Kingdoms | (China) Zhou Yun for Golden Anniversary of a Stormy Romance | —N/a | —N/a | (China) Huang Lei for Plots of Marriage Battle | (China) Ma Yili for Plots of Marriage Battle |
| 2014 | Best: (China) Lee Liqun for Family on the Go; Outstanding: (China) Hawick Lau for A Clear Midsummer Night; Outstanding: Chen Li for Beijing Youth; Outstanding: (South Korea) Lee Seung-gi for Gu Family Book | Best: (China) Li Sun for The Legend of Zhen Huan; Outstanding: (South Korea) Park Shin-hye for The Heirs; Outstanding: (China) Yang Tongshu for Guard Your Life | Best: (China) Jin Dong for Family on the Go; Outstanding: (South Korea) Choi Jin-hyuk for Gu Family Book | Best: (China) Sun Guitian for Guard Your Life | Best: (China) Wang Lei for We Love You, Mr. Jin; Outstanding: (China) Zhai Xiaoxing for Return to the Blessed Village | Best: (China) Song Dandan for We Love You, Mr. Jin; Outstanding: (China) Ge Xu for Return to the Blessed Village |

| Year | Director | Scriptwriter | Action Director | Theme Song |
|---|---|---|---|---|
| 2011 | (South Korea) Lee Hyung-min for Bad Guy | (China) Wang Wanping for Golden Anniversary of a Stormy Romance | (China) Feng Lin for Three Kingdoms | (Malaysia) "Linger" for Age of Glory 2 |
| 2014 | Best: (China) Zheng Xiaolong for The Legend of Zhen Huan; Outstanding: (South Korea) Kang Shin-hyo for The Heirs; Outstanding: (China) Zhao Baogang for Beijing Youth; Outstanding: (South Korea) Shin Woo-chul for Gu Family Book | Best: (China) Liu Lianzi, Wang Xiaoping for The Legend of Zhen Huan; Outstanding: (South Korea) Kim Eun-sook for The Heirs; Outstanding: (Singapore) Ang Eng Tee for The Journey: A Voyage | Best: (China) To-hoi Kong for Little Heroes; Outstanding: (South Korea) Kim Min-soo for Ugly Alert | Best: (China) "I Have Come to You" for Marry Me; Outstanding: (South Korea) "Moment" for The Heirs; Outstanding: (China) "Songs About the Knowledge of Bird" for Family on the Go |

== Entertainment ==
| Year | Variety Show | Infotainment | Game & Quiz Show | Host | Hostess |
|---|---|---|---|---|---|
| 2011 | (China) 2009 Miss Asia Pageant Final | (Singapore) Life Transformers 2 | (Singapore) Gatekeepers | Bobby Chinn for World Café Middle East – Istanbul | (Singapore) Quan Yi Fong for Life Transformers 2 |
| 2014 | Best: (South Korea) 2 Days & 1 Night ("Snowy Scene Gift"); Best: (China) 2013 BTV Spring Festival Global Gala; Outstanding: (Philippines) ASAP Gives Back | Best: (South Korea) The Human Condition; Best: (Singapore) Fill My Tank; Outstanding: (Singapore) Invite Mr. Wright: China | Best: (Singapore) Kids vs. Film; Outstanding: (China) Duets Beijing Happy-go; Outstanding: (China) Greatest Chef | Best: (Singapore) Oli Pettigrew for Kids vs. Film; Outstanding: (Singapore) Ian Wright for Invite Mr. Wright: China; Outstanding: (Philippines) Boy Abunda for The Bottomline with Boy Abunda ("Bemz Benedito") | Best: (South Korea) Lee Young-ja for Hello Counselor; Outstanding: (Singapore) Mohini Sule for Kids vs. Film; Outstanding: (Philippines) Kris Aquino for Kris TV ("Janice de Belen and Kids") |

== TV Documentary ==
| Year | Nature & Environment | Society & Culture | Director | Cinematography |
|---|---|---|---|---|
| 2011 | (Singapore) Extraordinary Asians - Elephant Guardian | (China) After the Disaster | (China) Cui Yazheng for Oasis in the Desert | (China) Wu Xiaoping for The Home of Mi-lu |
| 2014 | Best: (Japan) Legends of the Deep: Deep-sea Sharks; Outstanding: (South Korea) Cement Town Tragedy; Outstanding: (Singapore) Surviving Haiyan | Best: (South Korea) The Boy of Sorrow, King Lee; Outstanding: (China) Cloudy Mountains; Outstanding: (Cambodia) A River Changes Course | Best: (South Korea) Oh Kyu-ik for The Boy of Sorrow, King Lee; Outstanding: (China) Zhu Yu for Cloudy Mountains; Outstanding: (South Korea) Oh Kyu-ik for Cement Town Tragedy | Best: (China) Ge Song for Formica Beijingensis; Outstanding: (China) Wang Wen-ming for Whisper of Minqin; Outstanding: (Malaysia) Lee Ali for 101 East: Everest 60th Anniversary |

== TV Animation ==
| Year | Animation | Character Design | Director |
|---|---|---|---|
| 2011 | (Hong Kong) Temple Ride | (Hong Kong) Shemy Chung for Paperdoll | (Hong Kong) Joe Kwun, Miles Cheng for Temple Ride |
| 2014 | Best: (Hong Kong) Life Goes On; Outstanding: (Hong Kong) Yeti; Outstanding: (China) Shalen | (Hong Kong) Joe Kwun for Life Goes On; Outstanding: (South Korea) Lee Young-woon for T-pang Rescue; Outstanding: (China) Tian Chao for Kung Food | (Hong Kong) Joe Kwun, Miles Cheng for Life Goes On; Outstanding: (China) Horus Tsai for Adam's Bakery; Outstanding: (China) Zhang Yitao for Shalen |

== Special Jury Prize ==
| Year | Programme |
|---|---|
| 2011 | (China) Three Kingdoms |
| 2011 | (China) 2010 Shanghai Expo opening ceremony |

== See also ==
- List of Asian television awards
