= Romance Is a Bonus Book =

2019 South Korean television series

- Promotional poster
- Also known as: Romance Is a Supplement; How to Publish Love
- Hangul: 로맨스는 별책부록
- RR: Romaenseuneun byeolchaekburok
- MR: Romaensŭnŭn pyŏlch'aekpurok
- Genre: Romantic comedy
- Created by: Studio Dragon
- Written by: Jung Hyun-jung
- Directed by: Lee Jeong-hyo
- Starring: Lee Na-young; Lee Jong-suk
- Country of origin: South Korea
- Original language: Korean
- No. of episodes: 16

Production
- Executive producer: Hwang Jee-woo
- Camera setup: Single camera
- Production company: Story & Pictures Media

Original release
- Network: tvN
- Release: January 26 – March 17, 2019

Romance Is a Bonus Book (Korean: 로맨스는 별책부록) is a 2019 South Korean television series starring Lee Na-young and Lee Jong-suk. It aired from January 26 to March 17, 2019 on tvN.

== Synopsis ==
Cha Eun-ho is a successful author and a chief editor at a book publishing company. Kang Dan-i is a mother and former successful advertising copywriter. When Cha Eun-ho was a child, Kang Dan-i saved him from an accident and was injured. Kang Dan-i had Cha Eun-ho help her while she was recuperating in hospital and later on was in bedrest for one year. By helping her acquire books to read from the library, Cha Eun-ho himself became interested in writing. The two youngsters stayed close friends well into adulthood. However, their friendship was strained after Kang Dan-i started dating a selfish, inconsiderate man. Although he disapproved of her choice in a partner, and she too expressed doubt at times, Kang Dan-i stands by her decision to marry this man.

Now in the present, Cha Eun-ho enlists Kang Dan-i to help him find a housekeeper - but he has no idea Kang Dan-i is the one doing the work and taking payment. Her husband has cheated on her, and she is now divorced and unemployed, but he is also unaware of her living situation and the hardships she is facing as a divorced single mother with a large gap in work experience trying to re-enter the professional world. Eventually Kang Dan-i is no longer able to keep her secrets from him, and Cha Eun-ho lends her a helping hand. Their lives become even more intertwined when Kang Dan-i applies to be a temporary task support worker at his publishing company. Although Cha Eun-ho is initially worried about how she will perform, Kang Dan-i surprises him and other senior executives with her creativity and hard work.

The rest of the series is about the personal and professional challenges they face as they slowly start to realize their true feelings for each other and navigate this next stage of their lives.

== Cast ==
=== Main characters ===
- Lee Na-young as Kang Dan-i (37 years old)

A former advertising copywriter and a current unemployed divorcee who later joins the publishing company as a temporary task support team member.

- Lee Jong-suk as Cha Eun-ho (32 years old)

A successful writer who is also the publishing company's youngest editor-in-chief. He is a long-time friend of Kang Dan-i and harbours romantic feelings for her.

- Jung Yoo-jin as Song Hae-rin (29 years old)

The Lead Content Development Editor and trainer of the new recruits, including Kang Dan-i. She has long-standing feelings for Cha Eun-ho, her former trainer, but he does not reciprocate those feelings.

- Wi Ha-joon as Ji Seo-joon (29 years old)

A freelance book designer the publishing company is looking to hire, who also happened to cross paths with Kang Dan-i and later develops feelings for her. He and Cha Eun-ho have a turbulent relationship related to the conspiracy behind famous author Kang Byeong-jun's retirement and their feelings for Kang Dan-i.

=== Supporting characters ===
==== People at the publishing company ====
- Kim Tae-woo as CEO Kim Jae-min. He is a bit over-eager, but an overall well-meaning boss.
- Kim Yoo-mi as Director Go Yoo-sun. She discourages Kang Dan-i's efforts to become a part of the marketing team and keeps her busy with menial tasks around the office.
- Jo Han-chul as Bong Ji-hong. He is married to Seo Young-ah.
- Kim Sun-young as Seo Young-ah the marketing team manager who is married to Bong Ji-hong.
- Kang Ki-doong as Park Hoon, a talkative and eager-to-please new recruit on the marketing team.
- Park Gyu-young as Oh Ji-yool, a superficial and spoiled new recruit on the editorial team, with an overbearing mother.
- Lee Kwan-hoon as Lee Seung-jin
- Choi Seung-yoon as Bae Kwang-soo
- Lee Ha-eun as Chae Song-ee

==== Others ====
- Lee Ji-ha as Hae-rin's mother
- Oh Eui-shik as Hong Dong-min (Kang Dan-i's ex-husband)
- Lee Ji-won as Hong Jae-hee
- Hwang Se-on as Kim Na-kyung
- Noh Jong-hyun as Oh Ji-yool's ex-boyfriend

== Production ==
The first script reading was held on October 26, 2018 with the attendance of the cast and crew.

This series marks Lee Na-young's return to small screen after nine years

On January 21, 2019, a press conference was held to promote the series with the attendance of lead cast.

Lee Jong-suk finished filming his scenes for the series on February 27, 2019 due to his military service enlistment on March 8.

== Original soundtrack ==
Romance Is a Bonus Book OST

Soundtrack album by Various artists
- Recorded: 2019
- Genre: Soundtrack
- Languages: Korean; English
- Label: Kakao M

=== Part 1 ===
Released on February 3, 2019
No.	Title	Lyrics	Music	Artist	Length
1.	"Take My Hand" (나는 볼 수 없던 이야기)	Choi Jung-hoon	Choi Jung-hoon; Kim Do-hyung; Yoo Young-hyun	Jannabi	3:46
2.	"Take My Hand" (Inst.)		Choi Jung-hoon; Kim Do-hyung; Yoo Young-hyun		3:46
Total length:					7:32

=== Part 2 ===
Released on February 10, 2019
No.	Title	Lyrics	Music	Artist	Length
1.	"Rainbow" (레인보우)	Nam Hye-seung; Park Jin-ho	Nam Hye-seung; Surf Green; Park Min-joo	Rothy	3:31
2.	"Rainbow" (Inst.)		Nam Hye-seung; Surf Green; Park Min-joo		3:31
Total length:					7:02

=== Part 3 ===
Released on February 17, 2019
No.	Title	Lyrics	Music	Artist	Length
1.	"All I Do" (그대만 떠올라)	Roy Kim; Nam Hye-seung; Park Jin-ho	Nam Hye-seung; Park Jin-ho	Roy Kim	4:26
2.	"All I Do" (Inst.)		Nam Hye-seung; Park Jin-ho		4:26
Total length:					8:52

=== Part 4 ===
Released on February 24, 2019
No.	Title	Lyrics	Music	Artist	Length
1.	"I Pray"	Nam Hye-seung; Park Jin-ho	Nam Hye-seung; Surf Green	Motte	3:51
2.	"I Pray" (Inst.)		Nam Hye-seung; Surf Green		3:51
Total length:					7:42

=== Part 5 ===
Released on March 3, 2019
No.	Title	Lyrics	Music	Artist	Length
1.	"Some Day" (어떤 날)	The Black Skirts	The Black Skirts	The Black Skirts	4:06
2.	"Some Day" (Inst.)		The Black Skirts		4:06
Total length:					8:12

=== Part 6 ===
Released on March 9, 2019
No.	Title	Lyrics	Music	Artist	Length
1.	"A Book Of You" (너라는 책)	Nam Hye-seung, Park Jin-ho	1601	Son Ho-young (g.o.d)	3:51
2.	"A Book Of You" (Inst.)		1601		3:51
Total length:					7:42

=== Part 7 ===
Released on March 10, 2019
No.	Title	Lyrics	Music	Artist	Length
1.	"Close I'll Be" (너의 모든 기억속에)	Nam Hye-seung, Park Jin-ho	Kim Se-jin, Midnight	Kim Na-young	3:26
2.	"Close I'll Be" (Inst.)		Kim Se-jin, Midnight		3:26
Total length:					6:52

=== Part 8 ===
Released on March 16, 2019
No.	Title	Lyrics	Music	Artist	Length
1.	"Happy End"	Nam Hye-seung, Surf Green	Nam Hye-seung, Surf Green	SAya, Kim Ki-won	3:51
2.	"You're Beautiful"	Nam Hye-seung, JELLO ANN	Nam Hye-seung, Park Sang-hee	Will Bug	2:36
3.	"Walking On Sunshine"	Nam Hye-seung, Surf Green	Nam Hye-seung, Surf Green	SAya	3:11
Total length:					9:38

Disc 2:
No.	Title	Artist	Length
1.	"Romance is Supplement" (Opening Title)	Various Artists	0:44
2.	"A Warm Book"	Various Artists	3:58
3.	"Dan yi and Eun ho's story"	Various Artists	1:22
4.	"Dan yi's Room"	Various Artists	1:17
5.	"Eun ho's Whisper 1"	Various Artists	1:34
6.	"Eun ho's Whisper 2"	Various Artists	1:35
7.	"Funny publisher 'Gyeoroo'"	Various Artists	1:57
8.	"I know Kang Dang-yi"	Various Artists	1:31
9.	"Lovely Couples"	Various Artists	1:11
10.	"The Romance"	Various Artists	2:41
11.	"Today too fighting"	Various Artists	2:32
12.	"Where are my shoes?"	Various Artists	1:18
13.	"We on snow day"	Various Artists	1:49

== Viewership ==
Romance Is a Bonus Book : South Korea viewers per episode (millions)

Season	Episode number																Average
Season	1	2	3	4	5	6	7	8	9	10	11	12	13	14	15	16	Average
1	1.104	1.053	1.051	1.101	1.156	1.290	1.167	1.302	N/A	1.500	1.261	1.358	1.336	1.579	1.295	1.687	N/A

Source: Audience measurement performed nationwide by Nielsen Media Research.

Average TV viewership ratings
Ep.	Original broadcast date	Title	Average audience share (AGB Nielsen)	
Ep.	Original broadcast date	Title	Nationwide	Seoul
1	January 26, 2019	A Big Sister I Know, Kang Dan-i (아는누나, 강단이)	4.280%	4.937%
2	January 27, 2019	You Were Hiding In My House? (우리 집에 숨어 살았어?)	4.420%	5.466%
3	February 2, 2019	People Calling Me By My Name (사람들이 내 이름을 불러)	4.385%	5.355%
4	February 3, 2019	Everybody Turn Their Backs On Me (모든 이들이 내게 등을 돌려도)	4.256%	5.155%
5	February 9, 2019	I'm Curious Too, About My Feelings (나도 궁금해, 내 마음이)	4.436%	5.601%
6	February 10, 2019	I Think I Already Knew It From The Beginning (이미 안다고 생각하는 것도 다시 처음부터)	5.064%	6.468%
7	February 16, 2019	Tell Him I'm Waiting Here (나 여기서 기다린다고 전해줘요)	4.962%	6.073%
8	February 17, 2019	The Hot Touch Was A Dream (그 뜨거운 손길은 꿈이었을까)	5.378%	6.857%
9	February 23, 2019	That Old Book Is Like The First Time Reading (그 오래된 책이 마치 처음 읽는 책처럼)	5.8%	—N/a
10	February 24, 2019	There Are Days Like This (가 끔 오늘 같은 날이 있어)	5.822%	7.139%
11	March 2, 2019	We Have To Be Together, Why Do You Want To Break Up? (같이 있을 생각을 해야지, 왜 헤어질 생각을 해?)	5.029%	5.963%
12	March 3, 2019	How About A Title For Your First Date? (제목으로 첫 데이트는 어때?)	5.238%	6.396%
13	March 9, 2019	Did It Hurt Because Of Me? (나 때문에 마음 아팠지?)	5.329%	6.336%
14	March 10, 2019	You Know Me, Right? (너는 나를 다 알지?)	6.345%	7.753%
15	March 16, 2019	I Should Have Known If You Didn't Say Anything... (네가 말하지 않았어도 알았어야 했는데...)	5.018%	6.166%
16	March 17, 2019	As If I Had Met You In a Book and Received Warm Comfort.. (내가 너라는 책을 만나 따뜻한 위로를 받았듯이..)	6.651%	8.177%
Average			5.151%	— (Note: Due to some ratings not recorded, the exact average rating is unknown.)
In the table above, the blue numbers represent the lowest ratings and the red numbers represent the highest ratings.; N/A denotes that the rating is not known.; This drama aired on a cable channel/pay TV which normally has a relatively smaller audience compared to free-to-air TV/public broadcasters (KBS, SBS, MBC and EBS).

== Awards and nominations ==
Year	Award	Category	Recipient	Result	Ref.
2019	55th Baeksang Arts Awards	Best New Actor	Wi Ha-joon	Nominated	
2019	21st Mnet Asian Music Awards	Best OST	"Take My Hand" (Jannabi)	Nominated	
