= Hwa&Dam Pictures =

Korean drama production company

- Company type: Subsidiary
- Genre: Korean drama
- Founded: June 11, 2007; 19 years ago
- Founder: Yoon Ha-rim
- Headquarters: The Mosaic, 518 Dosan-daero, Gangnam District, Seoul, South Korea
- Key people: Yoon Ha-rim (founder, CEO)
- Products: TV series
- Services: TV series production
- Revenue: 8,157,810,000 won (December 2015)
- Number of employees: 4 (December 2012)
- Parent: Studio Dragon
- Korean: (주) 화앤담픽쳐스; RR: (Ju) Hwaaendampikcheoseu

Hwa&Dam Pictures (Korean: 화앤담픽쳐스; RR: Hwaaendampikcheoseu; lit. 'Flowers & Walls Pictures'; stylised as hwa&dam pictures) is a Korean drama production company and a subsidiary of Studio Dragon. It was founded on June 11, 2007 by former SBS drama producer Yoon Ha-rim.

== Works ==
Year	Title	Original title	Network	Notes	Ref.
2009	Hot Blood	열혈 장사꾼	KBS2		
2010	Secret Garden	시크릿 가든	SBS TV	Co-produced with Secret Garden SPC	
2011	Miss Ajumma	미쓰 아줌마	SBS TV		
2012	A Gentleman's Dignity	신사의 품격	SBS TV	Co-produced with CJ E&M	
2012	The Birth of a Family	가족의 탄생	SBS TV		
2013	The Heirs	왕관을 쓰려는 자, 그 무게를 견뎌라 – 상속자들	SBS TV		
2014	Cheongdam-dong Scandal	청담동 스캔들	SBS TV		
2014	One Sunny Day	좋은 날	LINE TV; DramaFever	First series aired outside South Korea	
2015	Bubble Gum	풍선껌	tvN		
2016	Guardian: The Lonely and Great God	쓸쓸하고 찬란하神 – 도깨비	tvN	Co-produced with Studio Dragon	
2017	Bravo My Life	브라보 마이 라이프	SBS TV	Co-produced with Studio Dragon	
2018	Mr. Sunshine	미스터 션샤인	tvN	Co-produced with Studio Dragon	
2019	Search: WWW	검색어를 입력하세요: WWW	tvN	Co-produced with Studio Dragon	
2020	The King: Eternal Monarch	더 킹: 영원의 군주	SBS TV	Co-produced with Studio Dragon	
2021	You Are My Spring	너는 나의 봄	tvN	Co-produced with Studio Dragon	
2021	Scripting Your Destiny	당신의 운명을 쓰고있습니다	TVING	Co-produced with Kakao M and Studio Dragon	
2022	Twenty-Five Twenty-One	스물다섯 스물하나	tvN	Co-produced with Studio Dragon	
2022–2023	The Glory	더 글로리	Netflix	Part 1 (December 2022) / Part 2 (March 2023)	
2025	Genie, Make a Wish	다 이루어질지니	Netflix	Co-produced with Studio Dragon	

== Managed people ==
=== Writers ===
- Kim Eun-sook
- Kwon Do-eun

=== Directors ===
- Baek Sang-hoon
- Jung Ji-hyun
- Lee Eung-bok
