= Genie, Make a Wish =

2025 South Korean television series

- Promotional poster
- Hangul: 다 이루어질 지니
- Lit.: Everything Will Come True
- RR: Da irueojil jini
- MR: Ta iruŏjil chini
- Genre: Fantasy; Romantic comedy
- Written by: Kim Eun-sook
- Directed by: Ahn Gil-ho
- Starring: Kim Woo-bin; Bae Suzy; Ahn Eun-jin; Noh Sang-hyun; Ko Kyu-pil; Lee Joo-young
- Music by: Lim Ha-young
- Country of origin: South Korea
- Original language: Korean
- No. of episodes: 13

Production
- Running time: 60 minutes
- Production companies: Hwa&Dam Pictures; Studio Dragon

Original release
- Network: Netflix
- Release: October 3, 2025

Genie, Make a Wish (Korean: 다 이루어질 지니) is a 2025 South Korean fantasy romantic comedy television series written by Kim Eun-sook, directed by Ahn Gil-ho, and starring Kim Woo-bin, Bae Suzy, Ahn Eun-jin, Noh Sang-hyun, Ko Kyu-pil, and Lee Joo-young. It was released on Netflix on October 3, 2025.

== Synopsis ==
A genie named Iblis is freed from his lamp after 983 years. He was imprisoned as a result of the actions of a woman named Ka-young, in a past life. Ka-young has been a psychopath from birth, and her life is a monotonous routine, controlled by her grandmother's strict rules. She struggles to survive and grapples with complicated emotional problems. When she meets Iblis, both of their lives are changed forever. Iblis has been looking for Ka-young's soul to reincarnate. He is eager to wreak vengeance on her, for unintentionally imprisoning him. Iblis grants Ka-young three wishes, and their journey is filled with both conflict and comedy.

== Cast and characters ==
=== Main ===
- Kim Woo-bin as Genie / Iblis

The spirit of a lamp that awakens after a thousand years.

- Bae Suzy as Ki Ka-young
  - Kim Yun-seul as child Ki Ka-young
  - Jeon Yu-na as teen Ki Ka-young

A heartless and emotionless human.

- Ahn Eun-jin as Lee Mi-joo

Ka-young's grandmother who becomes young again after a wish.

- Noh Sang-hyun as Ryu Su-hyeon / Eljjael

The genie's brother and rival.

- Ko Kyu-pil as Sade

The genie's assistant whose true nature is a black jaguar.

- Lee Joo-young as Choi Min-ji

Ka-young's only friend.

=== Supporting ===
- Kim Mi-kyung as Oh Pan-geum

Ka-young's grandmother.

- Woo Hyun-jin as Irem

Ryu Su-hyeon's assistant who transforms into an eagle-owl.

- Kim Mu-jun as Ko Yeong-hyeon

A newlywed who is a YouTuber.

=== Special appearances ===
- Kim Ji-hoon as Chauffeur Kim
- Daniel Henney as Kim Gae
- Kim Ah-young as Cult member
- Song Hye-kyo as Jinniya

Genie's ex-girlfriend.

== Production ==
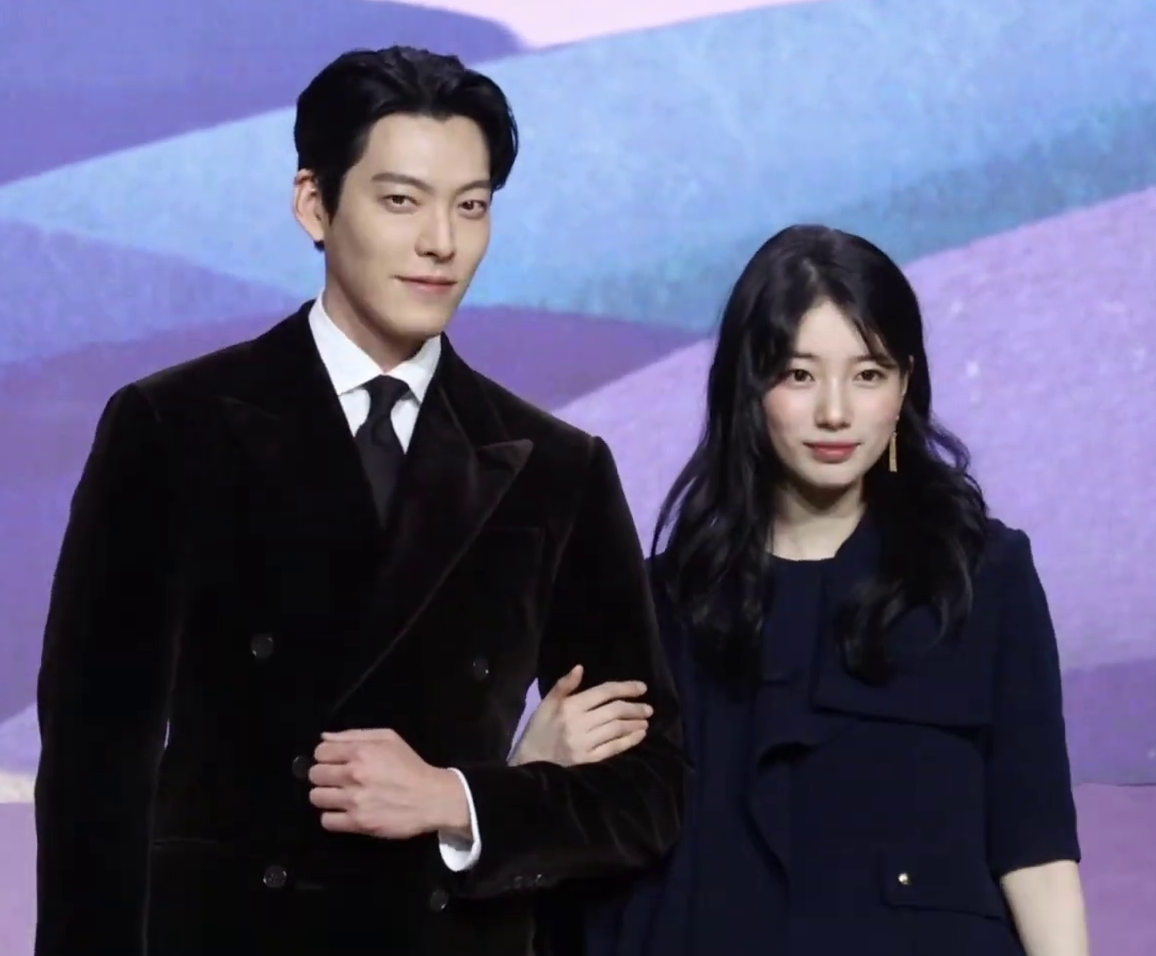
Kim Woo-bin and Bae Suzy at the series press conference in September 2025.

The series was announced by Hwa&Dam Pictures on June 14, 2023 with Kim Eun-sook as writer, Lee Byeong-heon as director, and Kim Woo-bin and Suzy as the protagonists; this marked the second collaboration between the two actors after Uncontrollably Fond in 2016. In May 2024, Netflix announced that it had acquired the rights to distribute the series and confirmed the casting of Ahn Eun-jin, Noh Sang-hyun, Ko Kyu-pil, and Lee Joo-young. Director Lee Byeong-heon later stepped down from the project due to personal reasons and was replaced by Ahn Gil-ho.

Filming was wrapped up on October 24, 2024. Some scenes were shot in Dubai in February 2024.

== Promotion and release ==
On February 4, 2025, during the event 'Next on Netflix 2025 Korea' which took place at the Fairmont Ambassador in Yeouido, Seoul, Netflix unveiled Genie, Make a Wish as part of the 2025 line-up. On the same day, promotional images confirmed that it would be distributed in the fourth quarter; the actual release date, October 3, was announced in August in conjunction with the release of the poster and the teaser trailer. On August 28, a second poster and the main trailer were unveiled. Another trailer was released on September 18.

On September 29, a press conference was held with the main actors. The next day, Kim Woo-bin and Suzy gave an ASMR interview to Netflix Korea accompanied by some games; the actress also promoted Genie, Make a Wish on singer Jo Hyun-a's YouTube show Ordinary Thursday Night and chef Sung Anh's Ahn's Guide to Doneness. On the day of the release, Suzy and Lee Joo-young participated in Hyell's Club with Lee Hye-ri.

== Original soundtrack ==
Genie, Make A Wish Original Soundtrack

Soundtrack album by Various Artists
- Released: October 3, 2025
- Genre: Soundtrack
- Labels: Netflix Music, LLC

No.	Title	Artist	Length
1.	"Genie"	Han, Felix, I.N	3:33
2.	"A Night Full of You"	Suzy and So Soo-bin	3:48
3.	"Game"	Soyeon and Yuqi	3:32
4.	"Lover"	Ha Hyun-sang	3:40
5.	"Answer"	Viola	3:08
6.	"Your Other Name"	Kwon Jin-ah	4:12
7.	"Genie, Make A Wish Title"	Byun Dong-wook	1:01
8.	"The Bizarre Story"	Lee Byung-jin	1:12
9.	"The Little Girl"	Kim Wan-jung	2:58
10.	"Three Wishes"	Byun Dong-wook	0:54
11.	"Inability to Adapt"	Lee Byung-jin	1:41
12.	"You are My Love"	Jin Myoung-yong	2:43
13.	"Iblis"	Shin Min-yong	3:07
14.	"From Hell"	Song Yoo-dam	3:16
15.	"Storm in the Dessert"	Mama Gorilla	3:16
16.	"The Evil"	Koo Ji-hyung	2:51
17.	"The Punishment"	Jin Myoung-yong	2:07
18.	"The Testament"	Son Han-mook	2:36
19.	"A Great Man"	Jin Myoung-yong	2:40
20.	"My Destiny"	Shin Min-yong	3:05
Total length:			56:34

== Reception ==
=== Critical response ===
On the review aggregator website Rotten Tomatoes, 75% of 8 critics' reviews are positive, with an average rating of 5.1/10.

The use of Iblis, a demonic figure in Islam, as the protagonist drew mixed reactions from viewers and commentators. On the one hand, Muslims viewers accused the production of cultural insensitivity, while critics claimed it distorted a religious concept for entertainment purposes. On the other hand, it was noted that popular culture often draws inspiration from Christian figures such as Satan without generating similar controversy, and the series was praised for allowing Koreans to approach Islamic culture in a more familiar way.

=== Viewership ===
During the week of October 6–12, 2025, Genie, Make a Wish was Netflix's most-watched non-English series with 8 million views; it also entered the top 10 in 50 countries and topped the charts in 10 territories, including Hong Kong, Peru, the Philippines, Thailand, Singapore, Vietnam, and the Dominican Republic. According to data collected by Good Data Corporation, it was the most-discussed OTT drama online in South Korea for the first two weeks of October, during which time Suzy and Kim Woo-bin ranked first and second, respectively, in the same actor rankings.
