= Vromance =

South Korean boy band (2016–2024)

- Origin: Seoul, South Korea
- Genres: K-pop; R&B
- Years active: 2016–2024
- Label: RBW
- Past members: Park Jang-hyun; Park Hyun-kyu; Yoon Eun-o; Lee Hyun-seok

Vromance (Korean: 브로맨스; RR: Beuromaenseu, stylized in all caps), was a South Korean vocal group formed by RBW in 2016. The group debuted on July 12, 2016, with the extended play (EP) The Action, and disbanded on September 20, 2024.

== History ==
=== Pre-debut ===
Prior to their debut, the four members worked as vocal trainers for Korean pop idols and recorded guide songs for singers. In August 2011, the group's leader Park Jang-hyun was a contestant on the singing contest Superstar K3, but later was eliminated. The following year, he signed with RBW (that time WA Entertainment). Park Jang-hyun and fellow members Park Hyun-kyu recorded "Love Is..." for the soundtrack of the 2013 SBS drama The Heirs. In 2014 Park Hyun-kyu was featured on "Goodbye Rain" by Jeon Min-ju and Euna Kim, future members of The Ark and Khan. In February 2016, Park Jang-hyun collaborated with Huh Gak for the song "Already Winter". In June 2016, RBW announced that would debuted the four members vocal group, VROMANCE.

=== 2016–2017: Debut with The Action, Romance and Mix Nine ===
The group debuted on July 12, 2016, with the release of their first EP The Action and its title track "She", which they described as swing-inspired and funky.

Vromance released their first digital single "Fishery Management" on September 14, 2016, which was described as medium-tempo song with bright rhythmical guitar and brilliant chorus.

Vromance released their second EP Romance on January 6, 2017, with the title track "I'm Fine", which has been described as heartwarming and traditional. They also held a comeback show one day before the release of their EP.

Vromance released their second digital single "Wake Me Up" on March 14, 2017.

In October 2017, Park Hyun-kyu and Lee Chan-dong participated in YG Entertainment reality survival show Mix Nine and were pitted against other trainees from another company to secure a spot in YGE's new project group. However, they were eliminated in episode 10.

=== 2018–2024: New digital singles and disbandment ===
On January 17, 2018, Vromance released their fifth studio single "Flower" produced by Jungkey. There were little to no promotions for this particular single.

One month later on February 21, 2018, they followed up with their sixth single "Star" which also underwent little to no promotions.

On April 6, 2018, Vromance released their seventh single "Oh My Season" which they promoted on several music shows.

On May 25, 2018, they released an OST for the Korean adaption of the American television show Suits entitled "Now".

On August 3, 2018, Vromance released their seventh single overall and final single of 2018 called "Basic Instinct" which did not receive a music video or promotions at all.

On March 1, 2019, they released their eighth single "Unlike" with little to no promotions.

On June 26, 2019, it was announced by RBW that Vromance would be returning with a comeback entitled "You can lean on me". The single was released on June 27, 2019, with all four members participating on the track despite Hyun-gyu's enlistment earlier in the month of June.

On December 15, 2019, they released the song "The Cure". All four members participated on the song, despite the enlistments of Jang-hyun, Hyun-gyu and Chan-dong. Various live performances of the song were subsequently released.

On June 22, 2020, Vromance released the song "Always You", with all members participating despite enlistments once again. A lyric video was released two days later.

On May 31, 2021, Vromance released the song "The Moment".

On October 5, 2021, it was announced that Lee Chan-dong has changed his name to Yoon Eun-o, and that he will be using his new name in future activities.

On September 20, 2024, RBW confirmed that Vromance has decided to end their group activities.

== Personal activities ==
In 2019, Jang-hyun was enlisted in supplemental service as a public duty personnel on April 26. The same year, Hyun-gyu was enlisted in active duty as a police officer on June 13, discharged on January 7, 2021. And Chan-dong was enlisted in active duty on August 5 to the Goseong 22nd Division, discharged on February 25, 2021. On June 17, 2020, Hyun-seok was enlisted in active duty.

On July 17, 2020, Jang-hyun posted a handwritten letter on Vromance's fancafe, announcing his marriage with a non-celebrity in August. The couple held a ceremony on March 21, 2021.

== Past members ==
- Park Jang-hyun (박장현)
- Park Hyun-kyu (박현규)
- Yoon Eun-o (윤은오)
- Lee Hyun-seok (이현석)

== Discography ==
=== Extended plays ===
List of extended plays, showing selected details, selected chart positions, and sales figures
Title	Album Details	Peak chart positions	Sales
Title	Album Details	KOR	Sales
The Action	Released: July 12, 2016; Label: RBW; Format: CD, digital download; Track listing: 1. Introduce (feat. Basick); 2. Old Lovers (오래된 연인들); 3. She (여자 사람 친구); 4. Bing (빙) (feat. Big Tray); 5. Already Winter (Only Janghyun); 6. She (여자 사람 친구) (Inst.)	28	567+
Romance	Released: January 6, 2017; Label: RBW; Format: CD, digital download; Track listing: 1. I'm Fine; 2. The Jobless (삼년째 백수); 3. Don't Say Goodbye (헤어지지 말자); 4. Thank You for Pretty (예뻐서 고마워); 5. Selfish (어장관리)	32	657+
"—" denotes releases that did not chart or were not released in that region.

=== Singles ===
List of singles, showing year released, selected chart positions, and name of the album
Title	Year	Peak chart positions	Sales (DL)	Album
Title	Year	KOR	Sales (DL)	Album
"She" (여자 사람 친구)	2016	—	KOR: 4,375+	The Action
"Selfish" (어장관리)	2016	—	—N/a	Romance
"I'm Fine"	2017	—	—N/a	Romance
"Wake Up Call" (모닝콜)	2017	—	—N/a	Non-album single
"Flower" (꽃)	2018	—	—N/a	Non-album single
"Star" (별)	2018	—	—N/a	Non-album single
"Oh My Season" (오 나의 계절)	2018	—	—N/a	Non-album single
"Primordial Instinct" (원초적 본능)	2018	—	—N/a	Non-album single
"Unlike" (같은 밤 다른 느낌)	2019	—	—N/a	Non-album single
"You Can Expect Me" (내게 기대어도 돼)	2019	—	—N/a	Non-album single
"The Cure" (치료가 필요한 사람)	2019	—	—N/a	Non-album single
"Always You"	2020	—	—N/a	Non-album single
"The Moment" (너만 없는 하루)	2021	—	—N/a	Non-album single
"—" denotes releases that did not chart or were not released in that region.

=== Collaborations ===
List of collaborations, showing year released, selected chart positions, sales figures, and name of the album
Title	Year	Peak chart position	Sales	Album
Title	Year	KOR	Sales	Album
"Already Winter" (with Huh Gak)	2015	67	KOR:81,008+	Non-album single

=== Soundtrack appearances ===
List of soundtracks, showing year released, selected chart positions, name of the album, and member's name
Title	Year	Peak chart positions	Sales (DL)	Album	Member(s)
Title	Year	KOR	Sales (DL)	Album	Member(s)
"Love Is..."	2013	69	KOR: 115,001+	The Heirs OST	Jang-hyun & Hyun-kyu
"Two People" (두 사람)	2013	65	KOR: 110,892+	The Heirs OST	Jang-hyun
"Love Is... (acoustic ver.)"	2013	—	—	The Heirs OST	Hyun-kyu
"I Fall In Love" (feat. Obroject)	2017	99	KOR: 19,304+	Strong Girl Bong-soon OST	All
"Full of Wonders"	2017	—	—	Man to Man OST	All
"Alone"	2017	—	—	Rude Miss Young-Ae 16 OST	Jang-hyun
"Now"	2018	—	—	Suits OST	All
"At The End of The Route"	2019	—	—	Rude Miss Young-Ae 17 OST	Jang-hyun
"Tonight"	2019	—	—	Search: WWW OST	Chan-Dong
"Hide and Seek"	2021	— (Note: "Hide and Seek" did not enter the Gaon Digital Chart but peaked at number 56 on the component Download Chart.)	—	The King's Affection OST	
"Full of You" (with Haeyoon (Cherry Bullet))	2021	—	—	The King's Affection OST	
"—" denotes releases that did not chart or were not released in that region.

== Filmography ==
=== Television shows ===
Year	Network	Title	Member(s)	Notes
2016	MBC	Duet Song Festival	Park Jan-Hyun	Ep. 22 - Winner
2017	MBC	King of Mask Singer	Park Jan-Hyun	Episode 119 as A Boy Drowning in My Song
2017–2018	JTBC	Mix Nine	Park Hyun-Kyu, Lee Chan-Dong	Final ranking 37th and 28th respectively
2018	MBC Plus	Casting Call	Chan-Dong	Episodes 5 - winner (a place in musical Gwanghwamun Sonata)
2018–2019	JTBC	Awesome Feed	Park Hyun-Kyu	Fixed cast
2018–2019	Channel A	Vocal Play	All	Season 1
2019	MBC	King of Mask Singer	Park Hyun-Kyu	Episode 189–191 as Pavarotti

=== Musical ===
Year	Title	Hangul	Member(s)	Rol	Notes
2018–2019	Gwanghwamun Sonata	광화문연가	Chan-Dong	as Myeong-Woo	
2019	Like a Butterfly	나빌레라	Chan-Dong	as Lee Chae-Rok.	
2020	Return: The Promise of the Day	귀환	Chan-Dong	as Hae-Il	military musical
