= The Heirs =

2013 South Korean television series

- Promotional poster
- Also known as: The Inheritors
- Hangul: 왕관을 쓰려는 자, 그 무게를 견뎌라 – 상속자들
- Hanja: 王冠을 쓰려는 者, 그 무게를 견뎌라 – 相續者들
- Lit.: He Who Wishes to Wear the Crown, Endures Its Weight – The Heirs
- RR: Wanggwaneul sseuryeoneun ja, geu mugereul gyeondyeora – sangsokjadeul
- MR: Wanggwanŭl ssŭryŏnŭn cha, kŭ mugerŭl kyŏndyŏra – sangsokchadŭl
- Genre: Romance; Drama; Teen
- Created by: Choi Moon-suk (from SBS Drama Production)
- Written by: Kim Eun-sook
- Directed by: Kang Shin-hyo; Boo Sung-chul
- Creative directors: Lee Kwang-young; Choi Ji-young; Choi Yong-joon
- Starring: Lee Min-ho; Park Shin-hye; Kim Woo-bin
- Music by: Park Se-joon
- Opening theme: "I Will See You" by Trans Fixion
- Ending theme: "I'm Saying" (말이야) by Lee Hong-gi
- Country of origin: South Korea
- Original language: Korean
- No. of episodes: 20

Production
- Executive producer: Yoon Ha-rim
- Producers: Shin Bong-chul; Lee Sung-hoon
- Camera setup: Single-camera
- Running time: 58–60 minutes
- Production company: Hwa&Dam Pictures

Original release
- Network: SBS TV
- Release: October 9 – December 12, 2013

The Heirs (Korean: 왕관을 쓰려는 자, 그 무게를 견뎌라 – 상속자들), also known as The Inheritors, is a South Korean television series starring Lee Min-ho, Park Shin-hye, and Kim Woo-bin. Written by Kim Eun-sook, the drama is set in a high school populated by the privileged and uber-rich. It aired on SBS from October 9 to December 12, 2013.

This was the first Korean drama co-produced by American digital distribution platform DramaFever and Korean production company Hwa&Dam Pictures.

Due to its star-studded cast and writer Kim Eun-sook (who previously wrote Lovers in Paris, Secret Garden and A Gentleman's Dignity), international broadcasting rights were sold to 13 countries. It had the highest selling price in Japan among all the 2013 Korean dramas at US$30,000 for each episode. As of January 26, 2014, the series has garnered more than one billion views on Youku, China's biggest video streaming site.

== Synopsis ==
The series follows a group of wealthy, privileged high school students as they are about to take over their families' business empires, overcoming difficulties and growing every step of the way.

Kim Tan (Lee Min-ho) is a wealthy heir to a large Korean conglomerate called Jeguk Group. He was exiled to the U.S. by his half-brother Kim Won (Choi Jin-hyuk), who tries to take control of the family business. While in the States, he meets Cha Eun-sang (Park Shin-hye), who went there to look for her sister. Despite being engaged to Yoo Rachel (Kim Ji-won), a fellow heiress, Kim Tan soon falls in love with Eun-sang. When Kim Tan returns to Korea, his former best friend turned enemy Choi Young-do (Kim Woo-bin) begins picking on Eun-sang to irritate Tan. Tension ensues when Young-do also falls in love with Eun-sang, and Kim Tan is forced to choose between his responsibility of pursuing the family business or love.

== Cast ==
=== Main ===
- Lee Min-ho as Kim Tan
  - Jung Chan-woo as young Kim Tan
  - Jeon Jin-seo as child Kim Tan

Heir to Jeguk Group. He is the son of his father's mistress, but is listed in the family registry as the son of the second wife in order to be a legitimate child. Though hot-headed and at times immature, Kim Tan is warm-hearted and honest. Although he is engaged to Yoo Rachel, he is attracted to Cha Eun-sang at first sight and falls in love with her despite her poor background.

- Park Shin-hye as Cha Eun-sang

Down-to-earth and somewhat cynical, Eun-sang diligently works part-time jobs to support herself and her mother after her sister leaves for the U.S. She lives in Kim Tan's home, since her mother is a live-in housekeeper for Tan's family. She is enrolled in Jeguk High School on a welfare scholarship given by Chairman Kim.

- Kim Woo-bin as Choi Young-do
  - Yang Hyun-mo as young Choi Young-do

The heir to the Zeus Hotel Group. Known for his cunning intellect and volatile manners, he is feared by his classmates, whom he bullies. He was formerly best friends with Kim Tan, but a misunderstanding made them enemies. Young-do begins picking on Cha Eun-sang to irritate Tan but he soon realizes that's not the only reason she's always on his mind.

=== Supporting ===
==== Jeguk High School ====
- Kim Ji-won as Yoo Rachel

Kim Tan's fiancée. The rich, chic and haughty heiress of clothing company RS International, she is also known as the "Paris Hilton of Jeguk High School". She dislikes Cha Eun-sang, and attempts many times to split her and Kim Tan apart. She is also on close terms with Tan's half-brother, Kim Won.

- Kang Min-hyuk as Yoon Chan-young

Son of Jeguk Group's secretary. Kind, cool-headed, warm, and smart, Chan-young always sees the best in people. Despite being in the social care group, he doesn't get picked on by the "higher social status" students because he is the class president. He is also Eun-sang's best friend, and his friendship with her makes his girlfriend, Lee Bo-na jealous. Nonetheless, Chan-young thinks that everything Bo-na does is cute, especially when she is jealous.

- Krystal Jung as Lee Bo-na

The beautiful daughter of the CEO of Mega Entertainment. Though somewhat spoiled, she is actually kind-hearted. She is praised for her beauty and cuteness. She is Kim Tan's first love and ex-girlfriend, and now they are still on friendly terms. She is now dating Chan-young. She dislikes Eun-sang at first for being Chan-young's best friend, believing that "there is no way for a girl and a boy to simply be just friends", but as the time goes by she became friends with her. She has a protective older brother she is close to who studies in New York.

- Kang Ha-neul as Lee Hyo-shin

Son of the attorney general. Calm and laid back, he runs the school broadcasting system together with Bo-na and later Eun-sang. He is also close friends with Kim Tan. Hyo-shin is constantly pressured by his family to get into law school, despite his dislike for the profession. To overcome his family's pressure, he joins the army without telling anyone besides Tan and Rachel. Hyo-shin also has a one-sided crush on his private tutor, Jeon Hyun-joo, but later falls for Rachel.

- Park Hyung-sik as Jo Myung-soo

Son of the CEO of Victory Law Firm, the largest law firm in the country. He is quick-witted, playful and often jokes around. He often hangs out at nightclubs and takes photos of his friends. He is best friends with Young-do and Bo-na.

- Jeon Soo-jin as Kang Ye-sol

The daughter of a former bar hostess who owns 10 large bars in Gangnam. She is Lee Bo-na's best friend. Her existence in Jeguk High School was unremarkable until Rachel exposed her mother's profession, which temporarily halted her friendship with Bo-na as she had looked down on Eun-Sang for her humble upbringing despite her own mother's past profession as a bar hostess. She has a crush on Choi Young-do.

- Cho Yoon-woo as Moon Joon-young

A victim of Choi Young-do's bullying at Jeguk High School due to his "welfare status". He later leaves the school.

==== People at Jeguk Group ====
- Choi Jin-hyuk as Kim Won

Kim Tan's older half-brother. The son of his father's first wife, who died when he was young. He is an accomplished and capable young executive who runs his family's giant conglomerate. At constant friction with his family, he attempts to rule the company himself, and fears that Tan will get in his way. Due to this, he had never had a real brotherly relationship with Tan, despite the latter trying everything he can to win his brother's heart. He is in a relationship with Hyun-joo, whom he later gives up on for the sake of the company.

- Jung Dong-hwan as Kim Nam-yoon

President of Jeguk Group, and father of Kim Tan and Kim Won.

- Kim Sung-ryung as Han Ki-ae

Kim Tan's mother and the mistress of Kim Nam-yoon. Though somewhat vain and self-centered, she cares for her son deeply and only wants him to be happy. She later forms a friendship with Eun-Sang's mother.

- Park Joon-geum as Jung Ji-suk

Chairwoman of Jeguk High School. Kim Nam-yoon's second wife, and Kim Tan's legal mother. Selfish and controlling, she attempts to take over Jeguk Group when her husband falls ill.

- Kim Mi-kyung as Park Hee-nam

The mute housekeeper of Tan's family, and mother of Eun-sang. She lost her voice when she was three years old due to a severe fever. She often gives advice to Kim Tan's mother. She is kind, and wants the best for her daughter.

- Choi Won-young as Yoon Jae-ho

Jeguk Group's secretary and Chan-young's father, who was previously involved with Esther Lee. He is Kim Won's confidant.

==== Others ====
- Choi Jin-ho as Choi Dong-wook

President of Zeus Hotel Group and father of Young-do. He is controlling and violent, and became a womanizer after his first wife, Young-do's mother, left their family. He is engaged to Esther Lee, but he's having an affair.

- Yoon Son-ha as Esther Lee

President of RS International and Rachel's mother, who is engaged to Choi Dong-uk, Young-do's father. However, she still appears to be in love with Yoon Jae-ho, whom she previously gave up on to marry someone who would help her business.

- Lim Ju-eun as Jeon Hyun-joo

A teacher at Jeguk High School. Diligent and earnest, Hyun-joo gets Kim Won's attention for her sharp intelligence, and they enter into a relationship. But she eventually broke up with Won to allow him to concentrate on running the company. She is also the private tutor of Hyo-shin, who had a crush on her.

- Baek Seung-hyeon as Secretary Jung
- Choi Ji-na as Yoo Kyung-ran

Choi Young-do's mother.

- Seo Yi-sook as Lee Hyo-shin's mother
- Jung Won-joong as Lee Chan-hyuk

Lee Hyo-shin's father.

- Lee Yeon-kyung as Lee Bo-na's mother
- Ra Mi-ran as Jo Myung-soo's mother
- Choi Tae-hwan as Lee Sang-woo

Choi Young-do's lackey.

- Yang Seung-pil as Hyo-joon

Choi Young-do's lackey.

- Kang Kyung-hun as Dong-wook's lover
- Choi Eun-kyung as Kang Ye-sol's mother
- Hwang Young-hee as Jeguk High School teacher
- Lee Joon-woo as student
- Lee Ga-ryeong as clothing store employee
- Jung Da-eun as herself

=== Special appearances ===
- Yoon Jin-seo as Cha Eun-suk / Stella Cha (ep. 1)

Cha Eun-sang's sister.

- Kim Hee-chul as music program MC (ep. 4)
- 2Eyes as themselves (ep. 4)
- VIXX as themselves (ep. 4)
- BtoB as themselves (ep. 4)
- Jung Joo-hee as announcer (ep. 15–16)
- Wang Ji-won as Yang Da-kyung (ep. 17, 19–20)

Kim Won's blind date woman.

- Lee Hyun-jin as Lee Hyun-jin (ep. 19)

Lee Bo-na's older brother

== Original soundtrack ==
The Heirs OST

Soundtrack album by Various artists
- Recorded: 2013
- Genre: Soundtrack
- Languages: Korean; English
- Labels: CJ E&M; FNC Entertainment; Hwa & Dam Pictures

The Heirs OST 1
No.	Title	Artist	Length
1.	"I'm Saying... (말이야)"	Lee Hong-gi	3:50
2.	"Love Is..."	Park Jang-hyun & Park Hyun-kyu (Vromance)	3:40
3.	"Moment"	Lee Changmin (2AM)	3:40
4.	"In the Name of Love (사랑이라는 이름으로)"	Ken (VIXX)	3:22
5.	"Two People (두 사람) (Remake)"	Park Jang-hyun (Vromance)	4:29
6.	"Serendipity (세렌디피티)"	2Young	3:37
7.	"Biting My Lower Lip (아랫입술 물고)"	Esna	3:43
8.	"Here for You"	Big Baby Driver	3:40
9.	"What We Used to Be"	Big Baby Driver	3:27
10.	"Some Other Day"	Big Baby Driver	3:27
11.	"I Will See You"	Trans Fixion	2:54
12.	"I'm Saying... (말이야) (Inst.)"	Lee Hong-gi	3:50
13.	"Love Is... (Inst.)"	Park Jang-hyun & Park Hyun-kyu (Vromance)	3:40
14.	"Moment (Inst.)"	Lee Changmin (2AM)	4:03

The Heirs OST 2
No.	Title	Artist	Length
1.	"Story (스토리)"	Park Shin-hye	4:35
2.	"Crying Again (또 운다)"	Moon Myung-jin	3:50
3.	"Only with My Heart (마음으로만)"	Lena Park	4:25
4.	"Don't Look Back (돌아보지마)"	Choi Jin-hyuk	4:07
5.	"Painful Love (아픈 사랑)"	Lee Min-ho	3:56
6.	"Love Is... (Acoustic Ver.)"	Park Hyun-kyu (Vromance)	3:10
7.	"In the Name of Love (사랑이라는 이름으로) (English Ver.)"	Ken (VIXX)	3:22
8.	"Growing Pains 2 (성장통 2)"	Cold Cherry	3:52
9.	"Heritor"	Various Artists	2:04
10.	"I'm Saying (말이야) (Piano Ver.)"	Various Artists	2:02
11.	"Dream Catcher"	Various Artists	2:30
12.	"Love Is... (Comic Ver.)"	Various Artists	1:25
13.	"Logical Love"	Various Artists	2:44
14.	"Weight of the Crown"	Various Artists	3:08
15.	"Aim at the Crown"	Various Artists	2:11
16.	"(별을 세는 아이)"	Various Artists	2:12
17.	"Portents of War"	Various Artists	1:58
18.	"Dream of One Summer Night (한여름 밤에 꿈)"	Various Artists	2:31

== Ratings ==
In the table below, the blue numbers represent the lowest ratings and the red numbers represent the highest ratings.

Ep.	Original broadcast date	Average audience share			
Ep.	Original broadcast date	Nielsen Korea		TNmS	
Ep.	Original broadcast date	Nationwide	Seoul	Nationwide	Seoul
1	October 9, 2013	11.6% (7th)	13.1% (6th)	9.9% (13th)	12.0% (5th)
2	October 10, 2013	10.5% (11th)	11.8% (9th)	11.2% (13th)	13.4% (5th)
3	October 16, 2013	10.6% (10th)	11.8% (6th)	10.9% (9th)	13.9% (4th)
4	October 17, 2013	11.5% (10th)	12.7% (7th)	12.4% (8th)	15.2% (4th)
5	October 23, 2013	11.4% (8th)	12.8% (7th)	12.2% (9th)	15.6% (3rd)
6	October 24, 2013	13.5% (6th)	14.8% (5th)	13.9% (5th)	17.9% (3rd)
7	October 30, 2013	13.1% (8th)	13.1% (7th)	12.9% (8th)	16.2% (3rd)
8	October 31, 2013	13.1% (5th)	14.1% (4th)	14.1% (4th)	17.6% (2nd)
9	November 6, 2013	13.4% (6th)	15.3% (6th)	13.3% (6th)	16.6% (3rd)
10	November 7, 2013	15.3% (5th)	17.2% (4th)	14.3% (4th)	17.9% (2nd)
11	November 13, 2013	15.4% (6th)	16.8% (5th)	13.9% (4th)	17.1% (3rd)
12	November 14, 2013	15.9% (5th)	17.5% (4th)	14.0% (5th)	17.8% (4th)
13	November 20, 2013	20.6% (2nd)	22.7% (1st)	18.2% (3rd)	22.1% (1st)
14	November 21, 2013	22.1% (2nd)	24.6% (1st)	19.4% (2nd)	23.4% (2nd)
15	November 27, 2013	19.8% (2nd)	21.0% (2nd)	18.2% (4th)	22.7% (1st)
16	November 28, 2013	21.1% (2nd)	23.2% (2nd)	20.2% (2nd)	23.8% (1st)
17	December 4, 2013	21.4% (2nd)	23.4% (2nd)	21.4% (2nd)	27.6% (1st)
18	December 5, 2013	23.9% (2nd)	26.5% (1st)	21.8% (2nd)	27.3% (1st)
19	December 11, 2013	24.3% (2nd)	27.0% (1st)	22.5% (2nd)	28.5% (1st)
20	December 12, 2013	25.6% (2nd)	28.6% (1st)	23.5% (2nd)	27.9% (1st)
Average		16.7%	18.4%	15.9%	19.7%

== Awards and nominations ==
Year	Award	Category	Recipient	Result
2013	18th Anhui TV Drama Awards	Popular Foreign Actress	Park Shin-hye	Won
2013	18th Anhui TV Drama Awards	Popular Foreign Actor	Kim Woo-bin	Won
2013	Baidu Fei Dian ("The Hottest") Awards	Best Asian Actor	Lee Min-ho	Won
2013	21st SBS Drama Awards	Top Excellence Award, Actor in a Drama Special	Lee Min-ho	Won
2013	21st SBS Drama Awards	Excellence Award, Actress in a Drama Special	Park Shin-hye	Won
2013	21st SBS Drama Awards	Special Acting Award, Actress in a Drama Special	Kim Sung-ryung	Won
2013	21st SBS Drama Awards	Top 10 Stars	Lee Min-ho	Won
2013	21st SBS Drama Awards	Top 10 Stars	Park Shin-hye	Won
2013	21st SBS Drama Awards	Top 10 Stars	Kim Woo-bin	Won
2013	21st SBS Drama Awards	New Star Award	Choi Jin-hyuk	Won
2013	21st SBS Drama Awards	New Star Award	Kang Min-hyuk	Won
2013	21st SBS Drama Awards	New Star Award	Kim Ji-won	Won
2013	21st SBS Drama Awards	Netizen Popularity Award	Lee Min-ho	Won
2013	21st SBS Drama Awards	Netizen Popularity Award	Kim Woo-bin	Nominated
2013	21st SBS Drama Awards	Netizen Popularity Award	Park Shin-hye	Nominated
2013	21st SBS Drama Awards	Best Couple Award	Lee Min-ho and Park Shin-hye	Won
2013	21st SBS Drama Awards	Best Dressed	Lee Min-ho	Won
2014	50th Baeksang Arts Awards	Most Popular Actor (TV)	Lee Min-ho	Nominated
2014	50th Baeksang Arts Awards	Most Popular Actor (TV)	Kim Woo-bin	Nominated
2014	50th Baeksang Arts Awards	Most Popular Actor (TV)	Park Hyung-sik	Nominated
2014	50th Baeksang Arts Awards	Most Popular Actress (TV)	Park Shin-hye	Won
2014	50th Baeksang Arts Awards	Best OST	Moment – Lee Changmin	Nominated
2014	2nd Asia Rainbow TV Awards	Best Modern Drama	The Heirs	Won
2014	2nd Asia Rainbow TV Awards	Best Leading Actor	Lee Min-ho	Nominated
2014	2nd Asia Rainbow TV Awards	Outstanding Leading Actress	Park Shin-hye	Won
2014	2nd Asia Rainbow TV Awards	Best Supporting Actor	Kim Woo-bin	Nominated
2014	2nd Asia Rainbow TV Awards	Best Supporting Actress	Kim Ji-won	Nominated
2014	2nd Asia Rainbow TV Awards	Outstanding Director	Kang Shin-hyo	Won
2014	2nd Asia Rainbow TV Awards	Outstanding Scriptwriter	Kim Eun-sook	Won
2014	2nd Asia Rainbow TV Awards	Outstanding Theme Song	Moment – Lee Changmin	Won
2014	9th Seoul International Drama Awards	Outstanding Korean Drama	The Heirs	Won
2014	9th Seoul International Drama Awards	Outstanding Korean Actor	Lee Min-ho	Nominated
2014	9th Seoul International Drama Awards	Outstanding Korean Actress	Park Shin-hye	Nominated
2014	9th Seoul International Drama Awards	People's Choice Actor	Lee Min-ho	Nominated
2014	9th Seoul International Drama Awards	People's Choice Actor	Kim Woo-bin	Nominated
2014	9th Seoul International Drama Awards	People's Choice Actress	Park Shin-hye	Nominated
2014	9th Seoul International Drama Awards	Outstanding Korean Drama OST	I'm Saying – Lee Hong-gi	Nominated
2014	9th Seoul International Drama Awards	Outstanding Korean Drama OST	Only With My Heart – Lena Park	Nominated
2014	7th Korea Drama Awards	Grand Prize (Daesang)	Lee Min-ho	Nominated
2014	7th Korea Drama Awards	Best Production Director	Kang Shin-hyo and Boo Sung-chul	Nominated
2014	7th Korea Drama Awards	Excellence Award, Actor	Kim Woo-bin	Nominated
2014	7th Korea Drama Awards	Excellence Award, Actor	Choi Jin-hyuk	Nominated
2014	16th Seoul International Youth Film Festival	Best Young Actor	Kang Ha-neul	Nominated
2014	16th Seoul International Youth Film Festival	Best Young Actress	Park Shin-hye	Nominated
2014	16th Seoul International Youth Film Festival	Best OST by a Male Artist	I'm Saying – Lee Hong-gi	Nominated
2014	16th Seoul International Youth Film Festival	Best OST by a Male Artist	Moment – Lee Changmin	Nominated
2014	3rd APAN Star Awards	Top Excellence Award, Actor in a Miniseries	Lee Min-ho	Nominated
2014	3rd APAN Star Awards	Excellence Award, Actor in a Miniseries	Kim Woo-bin	Nominated
2014	3rd APAN Star Awards	Excellence Award, Actress in a Miniseries	Park Shin-hye	Won

== Remake ==
A 2014 Chinese television drama titled Billion Dollar Heir (亿万继承人) starring Yu Xiao Tong, Kan Qing Zi and Korean singer-actor Choi Si-won was originally reported to be a remake of The Heirs, but this was later denied by Choi and director Li Shao Hong, citing the completely different story and characters. In 2016, it was announced that a Korea-Chinese film based on The Heirs is in the works.
