= A Gentleman's Dignity =

South Korean television series

- Promotional poster
- Hangul: 신사의 품격
- Hanja: 紳士의 品格
- RR: Sinsaui pumgyeok
- MR: Sinsaŭi p'umkyŏk
- Genre: Romance; Comedy; Drama
- Written by: Kim Eun-sook
- Directed by: Shin Woo-chul; Kwon Hyeok-chan
- Starring: Jang Dong-gun; Kim Ha-neul; Kim Soo-ro; Kim Min-jong; Lee Jong-hyuk
- Country of origin: South Korea
- Original language: Korean
- No. of episodes: 20

Production
- Executive producer: Kang Shin Hyo
- Producers: Yoon Ha Rim; Choi Kwan Yong
- Production location: Korea
- Running time: 60 minutes
- Production companies: Hwa&Dam Pictures; CJ E&M

Original release
- Network: SBS
- Release: 26 May – 12 August 2012

A Gentleman's Dignity (Korean: 신사의 품격) is a 2012 South Korean romantic comedy television series starring Jang Dong-gun, Kim Ha-neul, Kim Soo-ro, Kim Min-jong, and Lee Jong-hyuk. It aired on SBS from May 26 to August 12, 2012 on Saturdays and Sundays at 21:55 for 20 episodes.

The series marked Jang Dong-gun's return to television after twelve years. It was directed by Shin Woo-chul and written by Kim Eun-sook, the same team behind hit dramas Secret Garden, On Air, Lovers in Prague, and Lovers in Paris.

== Synopsis ==
A Gentleman's Dignity is about the careers and love lives of urban professionals. It tells the story of four men in their forties who have been friends since they were eighteen as they go through love, breakups, successes, and failures.

Kim Do-jin is a confident playboy who meets Seo Yi-soo and falls for her. To his surprise, she doesn't give him the time of day, and he discovers that she has a crush on his best friend, Im Tae-san. He begins a one-sided love for the first time in his life and tries to win her heart.

Im Tae-san starts dating Yi-soo's roommate, Hong Se-ra, but troubles arise when Yi-soo's crush is revealed and when Se-ra tells him she doesn't want to get married.

Choi Yoon is a lawyer who is still recovering from his wife's death four years ago, but begins to have feelings for Tae-san's much younger sister, Im Meari. Meari has always had a crush on Yoon. However, Yoon refuses to give in to his feelings and jeopardize his friendship with Tae-san.

Lee Jung-rok is married to a rich woman, Park Min-sook, but constantly flirts with other women, which causes problems and trust issues in their marriage.

Meanwhile, a teenager named Colin comes to Korea looking for the four men and claims one of them is his biological father.

== Cast ==
=== Main ===
- Jang Dong-gun as Kim Do-jin

A confident ladies' man who heads his own architectural firm with Im Tae-san. Do-jin has a memory loss problem in times of stress and records everything in his daily life using a voice recorder pen. He loves his car and named it "Betty".

- Kim Ha-neul as Seo Yi-soo

A high school ethics teacher who also umpires amateur baseball games in her free time. Yi-soo has had a secret crush on Tae-san for three years.

- Kim Soo-ro as Im Tae-san

A partner at Do-jin's firm, heading the construction division. He is a member of the Blue Cats baseball team and a long-time friend of Yi-soo.

- Kim Min-jong as Choi Yoon

A lawyer who is still recovering from his wife's death four years ago and is a member of the Blue Cats baseball team.

- Lee Jong-hyuk as Lee Jung-rok

Owner of a Mango Six café and a bar. He is married to a rich woman, Park Min-sook, but constantly flirts with other women.

=== Supporting ===
- Yoon Se-ah as Hong Se-ra

A pro golfer. She is Tae-san's girlfriend and Yi-soo's roommate.

- Kim Jung-nan as Park Min-sook

Jung-rok's extremely wealthy wife.

- Yoon Jin-yi as Im Me Ah-ri

Tae-san's younger sister and Yi-soo's past student. Meari came back to Korea after studying in America and has an interest in bag design. She has had a crush on Yoon for a long time.

- Lee Jong-hyun as Colin

An American-born Korean who comes to Korea, claiming that one of the four guys is his biological father. He develops a crush on Meari.

- Kim Woo-bin as Kim Dong-hyub

A student of Yi-soo who often gets into trouble at school. He has a crush on Yi-soo.

- Park Joo-mi as Kim Eun-hee

Colin's mother, and the first love of the four guys.

- Nam Hyun-joo as Teacher Park
- Park Ah-in as Attorney Kang
- Yoon Joo-man as Team Leader Choi
- Min Jae-sik as Mango Six Cafe's manager
- Kim Chang-seong as Sang-hyun
- Kim Geun as Kim Geun, Hwa Dam's employee
- Lee Joon-hee as Kwon, Hwa Dam's employee
- Jo Hyeon-gyu as Hyeon-gyu, Hwa Dam's employee
- Han Eun Sun as Young-ran, Hwa Dam's employee
- Ahn Jae-min as Yoo Seong-jae
- Kim Yoon-seo as Kim Eun-ji, Do-jin's ex-girlfriend
- Lee Yong-yi as Lee Mi-kyung, Yoon's mother-in-law
- Kim Sun-hwa as Director Song

=== Special appearances ===
- Sa-hee as Do-jin's seducer in the pub in (ep 1)
- Ahn Hye-kyeong as Yoon's client (ep 2 and 10)
- Shin Hye-jeong as Na Jong-seok's daughter (ep 3)
- Choi Sung-jo as Min-sook's fitness trainer (ep 3)
- Kim Kwang-kyu as a high school teacher (ep 4)
- Choi Soo-young as herself (ep. 5)
- Hwang Eun-soo as Hong Se-ra's golfing junior (ep 9 and 12)
- Kim Dong-gyun as Na Jong-seok (ep 11)
- Jung Yong-hwa as himself, and a past student of Yi-soo (ep 13)
- Juniel as a street performer at Hongdae playground (ep 13)
- Kim Sung-oh as an army instructor (ep 15)
- Jang Joon-yoo as Tae-san's blind date (ep 16)
- Cha Hwa-yeon as Yi-soo's mother (ep 16 and 19)
- Bae Ji-hyun as a reporter (ep 20)

== Prologues ==
A unique feature of this drama is that at the beginning of every episode, a prologue (or cold open) is shown. The prologues involve anecdotes about Do-jin, Tae-san, Yoon and Jung-rok's friendship through the years, and they all carry a humorous tone, except for episode 16. The prologues are not related narratively to the previous episode's ending or the present storyline. However, they underline each episode's theme.

Episode summaries
Episode 1 - Funeral of the pharmacist

The four guys' primary motive for attending the funeral is just to see the pharmacist's wife and her friends, who are ex-models. However, before they could pay their respects, a woman holding the pharmacist's illegitimate son arrives, and a fight breaks out at the funeral... So the four guys split what they need to do.

Episode 2 - Mini skirt girl

The four guys are gossiping about their friend, when Do-jin said they're at an age where they don't even know if someone likes them. As they're chatting, they see a woman wearing a very short mini-skirt, so their eyes are drawn to her. The woman bends down to pick something up, and the guys all lower their heads as well, trying to look up her skirt.

Episode 3 - It's our friend's daughter!

While at a club, the four guys spot a pretty young woman and, through a waiter book her for their room. They lie to her about their age, saying that they're 31 ("oppas") instead of 41 years old ("ajusshis"). Then Tae-san says she looks like one of their ex-classmates, and the girl says that he's her father! The four guys run away from the room.

Episode 4 - Who's the mastermind behind the adult movie?

Flashback to the four guys in high school, when they apparently get caught for watching adult movies, and the discipline master wants to meet their parents. At the field, each vows to admit that he's the mastermind and promises that they'll all get punished together. However, when in front of their teacher, Jung-rok admits it, but Tae-san, Yoon and Do-jin all point to Jung-rok, saying he did it. So in the end, only Jung-rok gets hit. There's a bit of an inside joke in the scene. The teacher is portrayed by Kim Kwang-kyu, the same actor who played Jang Dong-gun's teacher in the 2001 movie Friend. When the teacher keeps commenting that he looks familiar, and asks if he's from Busan and whether his father is an undertaker, those are all references to Friend.

Episode 5 - We're Girls' Generation's middle-aged male fans!

While in Jung-rok's cafe, the four guys are seemingly talking about economic issues, but the topic is actually the K-pop girl group Girls' Generation (SNSD). Do-jin says he likes Taeyeon, Tae-san likes Yuri, and Jung-rok likes Tiffany. But Yoon says they should care about their country as much as they care for those girls, giving the impression that Yoon isn't interested in SNSD. Suddenly, while he's talking, Jung-rok sees Sooyoung, and the other two go gaga over her too. Tae-san wants to ask Yoon to get Sooyoung's autograph for him, but before he finishes his sentence, Yoon has already disappeared... to talk to his favorite SNSD member, Sooyoung, at the counter. Yoon asks for her autograph and even starts dancing to some of SNSD's songs. The other three guys are left stunned.

Episode 6 - Whoever loses will pay

The four guys are playing billiards and decide that whichever team loses will have to pay for the sashimi they'll eat later. Do-jin and Jung-rok are on one team, Tae-san and Yoon on the other team. As the game continues, they take it more and more seriously. Do-jin even leaves the shop forgetting to change out of his slippers.

Episode 7 - Jung-rok and Min-sook's wedding

The night before Jung-rok's wedding, the other three guys go to Min-sook's house to give the marriage chest. Three women come out, wearing expensive jewelry. Yoon starts singing, and the other two guys dance. The next day, at the wedding, Jung-rok is all smiles, but Min-sook looks angry. The reason is that the groom's female friends are younger and prettier than the bride's. The three guys standing in the second row are thrilled to see the pretty girls in front of them. Do-jin narrates, "Everyone else is happy, except the two who are getting married."

Episode 8 - The four guys' first love

The setting is during their college days, and the four guys go on a group date with three girls. The girls are either too ugly or too fat, so the guys aren't interested in them and try to find ways to turn them off. Jung-rok brags that he's always last in school, Yoon acts like a mama's boy, Tae-san pretends to have a muscular disease and can't stop moving his hand, and Do-jin talks with a lisp. Suddenly, the fourth girl arrives, and she's so pretty that all four guys fall for her. She is Kim Eun-hee, the four guys' first love.

Episode 9 - Guys who love to beautify themselves

After they each finish taking a shower, Jung-rok appears in the bathroom with a complete set of facial creams, toner, etc. Yoon and Tae-san mock him, saying how a guy can care so much about his looks. Then Do-jin enters, and as Tae-san and Yoon tell him about Jung-rok, he quickly hides his eyebrow razor blade behind his back. But the guys catch him anyway, and Jung-rok ends up asking Do-jin where he bought the pink set.

Episode 10 - Im Yo-hwan is at the cafe!

The four guys are playing StarCraft, Do-jin and Jung-rok VS Tae-san and Yoon. As they're playing, they ignore phone calls from Min-sook and Se-ra since they're too busy "burning tanks" to answer. Shortly after, Jung-rok gets a call from his cafe, and Do-jin tells him to answer, as it would be ridiculous to go out of business while playing games. The employee says that actress Jun Ji-hyun is at the cafe; the four guys are surprised but continue playing, with Jung-rok telling his employee to hook up Jeon with coupons. Then, a few seconds later, the same employee calls again to tell Jung-rok that the expert StarCraft player Lim Yo-hwan is with Jeon. Upon hearing that, the four guys spring out of their seats immediately and rush to the cafe in a taxi, when the place is just a 5-minute walk away.

Episode 11 - I'm the basketball legend

The scene starts with the four guys at a park, deciding who should build the tent. Then, when they wanted to start their picnic, they realized that all of them had brought only alcohol; no one had brought food. So Jung-rok said he'd trade some alcohol with the girls camping near them, who had much food. However, the girls said they've already traded with the other guys playing basketball. So the four guys decide to play a game with the youngsters, with Do-jin saying the youngsters will be embarrassed because of his good skills. The game starts, and the four guys make a lot of mistakes. They're out of breath... They lost all the liquor they brought with them. They then asked Do-jin when was the last time he played basketball, and he said his last victory was 18 years ago in 1994 (a pop culture reference to actor Jang Dong-gun's hit 1994 basketball drama The Last Match).

Episode 12 - Let's quit smoking!

As suggested by Yoon, the four of them decide that they should quit smoking. However, without their cigarettes, they can't concentrate on anything they do, so they decided to find something to focus on. Tae-san goes to the gym, but ends up smelling the guy beside him because the guy just finished smoking; Yoon eats sweet stuff like waffle sticks and lollipop, but ends up treating the waffle stick as a cigarette; Jung-rok chooses the NC-17 method; Do-jin grows plants, but ends up plucking all the leaves from the plants and crushing them in a pot, with a 'cigarette' in his mouth. The process did not go smoothly, but they did end up quitting smoking.

Episode 13 - How we deal with farewells..

Scenes show each of them breaking up with their girlfriends, and whenever one does, the other three will be saying, "Hey! You forgot one woman with another woman!". But in Tae-san's case, he was drafted for the military. On the day he has to leave, the three guys come to send him off, but Tae-san doesn't want them to because the rest of the guys who were also drafted all have their girlfriends to bid farewell to. Except for him, he only has Do-jin, Jung-rok and Yoon...

Episode 14 - Future Steve Jobs!

The scene is set to February 16, 1995, around 20 years ago, when televisions were still the analog type. Do-jin, Tae-san and Yoon are watching a hit drama's finale. After the drama finishes, Jung-rok comes home and asks what happened, but they refuse to tell him. So Jung-rok takes out his cell phone, saying he'll call his mom to find out. The three guys are so fascinated by the cellphone, they tell him the drama's ending and take the phone to play with it. Then they start listing the current technology that the world didn't have 20 years ago. The scene then changes to some years after that, the four guys are all dressed like Steve Jobs, still talking about their different ideas.

Episode 16

Yoon's wife dies, and the three men rush to his side and cry together.

Episode 17 - Heroes

The scene starts with the guys reminiscing about the 2002 World Cup. Do-jin comments on how great it was for a Korean to make it to the Premier League, and how proud he was of this accomplishment. Jung-rok enters with a cake with Robot Taekwon V decorations on it and starts talking about how, when he was a kid, how much he worshipped Taekwon V as his hero. The others start commenting on who their heroes are. Yoon picks Superman, Do-jin picks Batman, and Tae-san picks Spider-Man. They argue about who is the best, with Jung-rok interrupting the conversation several times, saying that Taekwon V is the best. The scene ends with Do-jin saying that when they were children, they wanted to be heroes, but now that they're older, they can barely take care of day-to-day business. He wonders who would look upon them as heroes.

Episode 18

The 4 are in Yoon's car, stopped at a red light singing "Hotel California," when they're hit from behind by a young man whom they believe is driving his father's car. The 4 decide to make a show of it, and get out of the car, pretending to have neck injuries. The young man also gets out of the car and asks if he can make a phone call. The guys all grab their own phones and pretend to be calling a variety of people. Yoon pretends to be calling a lawyer, describing the accident. Tae-san pretends to call the police chief, saying that although he's not hurt badly, his neck hurts, and with a neck injury, one never knows. Jung-rok pretends to call his wife, telling her to tell everybody who is anybody about the accident. Do-jin pretends to call a crime scene investigator. As they finish up their calls, the young man also makes a call. The 4 assume that he's also going to make a fake call. It turns out he's calling the insurance company, and is informed that they will arrive in 10 minutes. The young man asks if they are okay. They go sit in Yoon's car while waiting for the insurance representative. Do-jin comments in his narrative that when they were young, they hated older men who did things in a roundabout way. He realizes that now, they've become the kind of people they hated when they were young men.

Episode 19

Yi-soo, Se-ra, Meari and Min-sook enter a restaurant where the men are waiting. They are wearing revealing clothing, and the men use napkins to cover them up. When the women go to the bathroom, the men talk about how they hate it when women wear revealing clothing, and other guys look at them. Suddenly, a girl enters the restaurant, and their eyes are drawn to her. The woman bends down to pick something up, and the guys all lower their heads as well, trying to look up her skirt.

Episode 20

The scene shows how the men first met in high school. Tae-san enters the classroom and demands to know who's the strongest in the class. Do-jin answers that he is. Jung-rok enters and asks who owns the sneakers he's holding, and Yoon puts up his hand. The four boys go outside and start fighting. The scene changes to the present with Colin, Dong-hyub and two other guys in high school becoming good friends.

== Original soundtrack ==
The drama has released seven parts of the soundtrack in two OST albums, the first part is "High High" by Kim Tae-woo and the second part features various artists including Jeon Geun-hwa with single "Beautiful Words", Kyung-woo with single "When I Look At You" and Park Eun-ooh with single "Everyday". Actors Jang Dong-gun, Lee Jong-hyun and Kim Min-jong also contributed songs to the soundtrack included in A Gentleman's Dignity OST 2.

A Gentleman's Dignity OST 1
No.	Title	Artist	Length
1.	"My Heartache (가슴이 시린 게)"	Lee Hyun (8eight)	4:34
2.	"High High"	Kim Tae-woo	3:13
3.	"Love... What to Do (사랑... 어떡하나요)"	Yangpa	4:30
4.	"Beautiful Words (아름다운 말)"	Jeon Geun-hwa	4:27
5.	"Everyday"	Park Eun-ooh	3:59
6.	"When I Look At You (널 보면 말이야)"	Gyun Woo	3:28
7.	"You Are Everywhere"	Big Baby Driver	3:14
8.	"Spring I Love You Best"	Big Baby Driver	2:27
9.	"High High (Bossa Nova Story)"	Various Artists	2:36
10.	"My Heartache (Piano Ver.)"	Various Artists	1:55
11.	"Love... What to Do (Inst.)"	Various Artists	4:30
12.	"O.S. Love"	Various Artists	2:38
13.	"You Are Everywhere (Guitar Story)"	Various Artists	2:48
14.	"Everyday (Comic Story)"	Various Artists	2:23
15.	"Smile (Feat. Jay Kim)"	Various Artists	3:00

A Gentleman's Dignity OST 2
No.	Title	Artist	Length
1.	"More Than Me (나보다 더)"	Jang Dong-gun	4:31
2.	"My Love (내 사랑아)"	Lee Jong-hyun (CNBLUE)	3:46
3.	"Beautiful Pain (아름다운 아픔) (2012 New Ver.)"	Kim Min-jong	4:02
4.	"Your Sun Is Stupid"	Big Baby Driver	2:35
5.	"More Than Me (Inst.)"	Various Artists	4:31
6.	"My Love (Inst.)"	Various Artists	3:46
7.	"Fighting Allows (Fighting 있게)"	Various Artists	1:44
8.	"It's Imagination (상상하는 걸로)"	Various Artists	2:14
9.	"Offensive Hips (공격형 엉덩이)"	Various Artists	1:32
10.	"Indelible scent (지울 수 없는 향기)"	Various Artists	2:51
11.	"Happy Footstep"	Various Artists	1:47
12.	"Crazy Time"	Various Artists	1:25
13.	"You Anywhere (너는 어디서나)"	Various Artists	1:50
14.	"That Person That Love (그 사람 그 사랑)"	Various Artists	2:27
15.	"Starting Today, Lover (오늘부터 연인)"	Various Artists	2:05

== Ratings ==
Episode	Date	TNmS		AGB Nielsen	
Episode	Date	Nationwide	Seoul	Nationwide	Seoul
1	2012-05-26	13.7%	15.9%	14.1%	16,0%
2	2012-05-27	12.1%	15.2%	12.8%	14.6%
3	2012-06-02	14%	15.6%	14.9%	16.7%
4	2012-06-03	14.8%	19.0%	14.8%	16.5%
5	2012-06-09	17.4%	20.5%	15.9%	17.0%
6	2012-06-10	16.5%	20.3%	16.8%	19.4%
7	2012-06-16	18.7%	22.6%	17.1%	18.6%
8	2012-06-17	18.4%	22.3%	16.6%	18.6%
9	2012-06-23	19.7%	22.9%	18.6%	20.2%
10	2012-06-24	19.8%	22.0%	20.3%	21.9%
11	2012-06-30	23.1%	26.0%	22.0%	23.0%
12	2012-07-01	23.1%	26.3%	20.3%	21.7%
13	2012-07-07	21.9%	26.0%	22.0%	23.4%
14	2012-07-08	22.8%	26.7%	21.6%	22.3%
15	2012-07-14	26.0%	30.1%	23.5%	24.8%
16	2012-07-15	26.0%	29.6%	23.7%	25.3%
17	2012-07-21	26.7%	30.5%	24.4%	26.1%
18	2012-07-22	21.8%	25.3%	24.4%	26.0%
19	2012-08-11	18.2%	20.4%	18.1%	19.3%
20	2012-08-12	24.9%	28.8%	23.5%	25.3%
Average		20.0%	23.3%	19.3%	20.8%

== Awards and nominations ==
Year	Award	Category	Nomination	Result	Ref
2012	5th Korea Drama Awards	Best Drama	A Gentleman's Dignity	Nominated	
2012	5th Korea Drama Awards	Best New Actress	Yoon Jin-yi	Won	
2012	5th Korea Drama Awards	Best OST	"My Love" – Lee Jong-hyun	Nominated	
2012	14th Mnet Asian Music Awards	Best OST	"My Love" – Lee Jong-hyun	Nominated	
2012	20th Korean Culture and Entertainment Awards	Best Supporting Actress in a Drama	Nam Hyun-joo	Won	
2012	1st K-Drama Star Awards	Excellence Award, Actress	Kim Ha-neul	Nominated	
2012	1st K-Drama Star Awards	Acting Award, Actress	Kim Jung-nan	Won	
2012	1st K-Drama Star Awards	Rising Star Award	Yoon Jin-yi	Won	
2012	4th Melon Music Awards	Music Style - Best OST	"My Love" – Lee Jong-hyun	Nominated	
2012	4th Melon Music Awards	T-Store Best Song Award	"My Love" – Lee Jong-hyun	Nominated	
2012	4th Melon Music Awards	T-Store Best Song Award	"My Heartache" - Lee Hyun	Nominated	
2012	25th Grimae Awards	Best New Cinematographer	Hwang Min-shik	Won	
2012	SBS Drama Awards	Top Excellence Award, Actor in a Weekend/Serial Drama	Jang Dong-gun	Won	
2012	SBS Drama Awards	Top Excellence Award, Actress in a Weekend/Serial Drama	Kim Ha-neul	Won	
2012	SBS Drama Awards	Excellence Award, Actor in a Weekend/Serial Drama	Kim Soo-ro	Won	
2012	SBS Drama Awards	Excellence Award, Actress in a Weekend/Serial Drama	Yoon Se-ah	Nominated	
2012	SBS Drama Awards	Special Acting Award, Actor in a Weekend/Serial Drama	Kim Min-jong	Won	
2012	SBS Drama Awards	Special Acting Award, Actor in a Weekend/Serial Drama	Lee Jong-hyuk	Won	
2012	SBS Drama Awards	Special Acting Award, Actress in a Weekend/Serial Drama	Kim Jung-nan	Won	
2012	SBS Drama Awards	New Star Award	Yoon Jin-yi	Won	
2012	SBS Drama Awards	New Star Award	Lee Jong-hyun	Won	
2012	SBS Drama Awards	Top 10 Stars	Jang Dong-gun	Won	
2012	SBS Drama Awards	Top 10 Stars	Kim Ha-neul	Won	
2012	SBS Drama Awards	Popularity Award	Kim Ha-neul	Won	
2012	SBS Drama Awards	Best Couple Award	Kim Min-jong and Yoon Jin-yi	Won	
2012	SBS Drama Awards	Lifetime Achievement Award	Kim Eun-sook	Won	
2013	22nd High1 Seoul Music Awards	Best OST	"My Love" – Lee Jong-hyun	Won	
2013	49th Baeksang Arts Awards	Best New Actress (TV)	Yoon Jin-yi	Nominated	
2013	49th Baeksang Arts Awards	Most Popular Actor (TV)	Jang Dong-gun	Nominated	
2013	49th Baeksang Arts Awards	Most Popular Actress (TV)	Kim Ha-neul	Nominated	
2013	49th Baeksang Arts Awards	Most Popular Actress (TV)	Yoon Jin-yi	Nominated	

== Novel ==
A two-part novelization was published in August 2012.
