= Kim Jung-eun's Chocolate =

- Promotional poster
- Genre: Music, talk show
- Starring: Kim Jung-eun
- Country of origin: South Korea
- Original language: Korean
- No. of episodes: 137

Production
- Producers: Jang Hyuk-jae; Kwak Seung-young
- Running time: 60-70 minutes per episode

Original release
- Network: SBS
- Release: March 11, 2008 – March 20, 2011

Kim Jung-eun's Chocolate (Korean: 김정은의 초콜릿) was a South Korean late-night television music program which began airing on March 11, 2008, on Tuesday nights at 12:35 am on SBS replacing Lee Juk's Music Space. It was then moved to Wednesday nights at 12:30 am, Saturday nights at 12:10 am, and now Sunday nights at 12:10 am. It is hosted by famed actress, Kim Jung-eun, who starred in highly rated dramas such as Lovers in Paris and its sequel, Lovers. It aired its 3rd anniversary as its final episode on March 20, 2011.

== Format ==
Each episode at least one guest will perform on the show, as well as a conversation with host, Kim Jung-eun. A section of the stage was dedicated to "Just married couples", which would be introduced. At the end of the show, a segment called Sweet Recipe (달콤한 레시피) was presented by Kim Jung-eun, where she would talk about special life lessons. Both have been discontinued as of the 2009 Spring revamp. As part of the revamp, the show was moved to Saturdays at 12:10 am to avoid competition with MBC's Music Travel, La, La, La, and featured a new set and new segments Genre Stars Best of the Best All Come Out Number 1 Festival (장르별 최강자 총출동 No.1 Festival), which featured a "competition" between the guests of that night's theme (i.e. Rock, Hip-Hop, Ballad), and Hot Choco Concert (Hot Choco 콘서트) which was a special performance by a guest. Between performances, Kim Jung-eun would also have conversations with the guests and Q&A sessions. Those two segments were abandoned after weeks and were replaced with more performances and a Honest Speed Q&A (솔직담백 스피드 Q&A) segment. As of July 4, 2010, the program moved to Sunday nights at 12:10 am.

== List of episodes ==
=== 2008 ===
| Episode # | Original Airdate (Note: Due to the program airing after midnight, technically it airs the day after the day it is scheduled to broadcast, but is part of the scheduled day's broadcast day. For example, Tuesday night at 12:35AM would technically be early Wednesday morning, but is still considered to be aired on Tuesday as part of Tuesday's schedule. Therefore, the airdates listed would be the broadcast day and not the technical day. Currently, Sunday night at 12:20AM would technically be early Monday morning.) | Guests |
|---|---|---|
| 1 | March 11, 2008 | Lena Park, Yurisangja, Lee Seo-jin, Kim Jang-hoon |
| 2 | March 18, 2008 | Sung Si-kyung, Gummy, T.O.P, Koo Jun-yup, Park Ji-eun, Tei |
| 3 | March 25, 2008 | Lee So-ra |
| 4 | April 1, 2008 | Lee Beom-soo, Nam Kyung-ju, Choi Jung-won, Ha Dong-gyun |
| 5 | April 8, 2008 | Yoon Do-hyun, Kang San-ae, Davichi |
| 6 | April 22, 2008 | Lee Seung-hwan, Cha Tae-hyun, 45 rpm |
| 7 | April 29, 2008 | Big Mama, Park Hye-kyung |
| 8 | May 7, 2008 (Note: The show moves to Wednesday nights at 12:30AM.) | Lee Seung-chul, Song Yun-ah, Park Yong-ha, Jang Na-ra |
| 9 | May 14, 2008 | No Brain, Lee Hyun-woo, Kim Kwang-min, Lena Park, Paran |
| 10 | May 21, 2008 | Lee Joon-gi, Big Bang, Woong-san |
| 11 | May 28, 2008 | Sim Soo-bong, Epik High, Namolla Family, Shin Bong-sun, Evan |
| 12 | June 4, 2008 | Kim Jang-hoon, Koo Jun-yup, Chae Yeon, Kim Gun-mo |
| 13 | June 11, 2008 | Fly to the Sky, Kim Sang-joong, Kim Heung-su, Yu In-young, Nell, Moony |
| 14 | June 18, 2008 | Jaurim, Nebbia, Oh Ji-ho, V.O.S |
| 15 | June 25, 2008 | Kim Hyun-jung, SG Wannabe, Ock Joo-hyun |
| 16 | July 2, 2008 | Clazziquai, Taeyang, Gummy, Do Won-kyung |
| 17 | July 9, 2008 | DJ DOC, 45 rpm, Wonder Girls |
| 18 | July 16, 2008 | Soo Ae, Uhm Jung-hwa, Kim Jin-pyo |
| 19 | July 23, 2008 | Han Suk-kyu, The Nuts, Hong Kyung-min, Lee Jung |
| 20 | July 30, 2008 | Buga Kingz, Epik High, Ye Ji-won, Tak Jae-hoon, Seo In-young, One Two, Park Sang-min, Choi Jung-won, Lee Ha-nui, Sunday Brunch |
| 21 | August 6, 2008 | Kim Gun-mo, Ji Suk-jin, Kim Je-dong, Kim Chang-wan, Chae Yeon, Koo Jun-yup |
| 22 | August 27, 2008 | Cool, Kang San-ae, Han Young |
| 23 | September 3, 2008 | Sweet Sorrow, BMK, Dynamic Duo |
| 24 | September 10, 2008 | Kim Bum-soo, Younha, Kim Dong-wan, Crying Nut |
| 25 | September 17, 2008 | Kim Jung-min, Baek Ji-young, F.T. Island |
| 26 | September 24, 2008 | Kim Hye-soo, No Brain, Big Bang |
| 27 | October 1, 2008 | TVXQ, Yoo Ye-eun, Super Junior-Happy |
| 28 | October 8, 2008 | Moon So-ri, Shin Hye-sung, Taeyeon (Girls' Generation), Cherry Filter |
| 29 | October 15, 2008 | Alegria, Lee Jong-hyuk, Gong Hyo-jin, Tree Bicycle, Park Ki-young, Ibadi |
| 30 | October 22, 2008 | Shin Seung-hun, Son Ho-young |
| 31 | October 29, 2008 | Gong Hyung-jin, Lee Sung-jin, Andy, Kim Jong-seo, Defconn |
| 32 | November 5, 2008 | Wonder Girls, Song Chang-eui, V.O.S |
| 33 | November 12, 2008 | Yoo Jun-sang, Wheesung, W & Whale |
| 34 | November 19, 2008 | Kang Ho-dong, Yoon Jong-shin, Eun Ji-won, Lee Su-geun |
| 35 | November 26, 2008 | Rain, Tei |
| 36 | December 3, 2008 | Kim Jong-kook, Jung Hoon-hee, Kim C |
| 37 | December 10, 2008 | Son Dam-bi, Lee Min-woo, Baek Ji-young, Namolla Family |
| 38 | December 17, 2008 | Lee Sun-kyun, Eugene, Lee Soo-young, MC the Max |
| 39 | December 24, 2008 | Joo Jin-mo, Big Bang, Brown Eyed Girls |

=== 2009 ===
| Episode # | Original Airdate | Guests |
|---|---|---|
| 40 | January 7, 2009 | Kang Sung-yeon, Kim Gun-mo, Kim Hyung-bum, Cultwo |
| 41 | January 14, 2009 | Jung Joon-ho, Jung Woon-taek, Kim Bum-soo, Rumble Fish |
| 42 | January 21, 2009 | Tei, Seo Young-eun, K.Will |
| 43 | January 28, 2009 | Bobby Kim, Jaurim, Kim Kyung-rok |
| 44 | February 11, 2009 | Kim Jang-hoon, Moon Jeong-hee, Uhm Tae-woong, SS501 |
| 45 | February 18, 2009 | Yoon Jong-shin, Ha Rim, Hwayobi, Lyn, Ji-sun |
| 46 | February 25, 2009 | Girls' Generation, Jung Yeop, Lee So-jung |
| 47 | March 4, 2009 | Wheesung, Jewelry S, Susie Kang |
| 48 | March 11, 2009 | MC Mong, Jang Yun-jeong, SSaW, No Brain, Buga Kingz, Dynamic Duo |
| 49 | March 18, 2009 | Hwang Jung-min, Im Chang-jung, Red Sun |
| 50 | April 1, 2009 | Fly to the Sky, Lyn, Lee Sei-jun, Taewon |
| 51 | April 8, 2009 | Yoon Do Hyun Band, Noh Hong-chul, Epik High, UPTOWN |
| 52 | April 15, 2009 | Shin Hye-sung, Lee Ji-hoon, Lena Park, K.Will |
| 53 | April 22, 2009 | Super Junior (Heechul, Leeteuk, Eunhyuk, Donghae, Ryeowook), Son Dam-bi, Kim Rae-won, 2AM, Sweet Sorrow |
| 54 | May 2, 2009 (Note: The show moves to Saturday nights at 12:10AM.) | Jaurim, Cultwo, Yurisangja |
| 55 | May 9, 2009 | Jang Seo-hee, Insooni, Younha, W & Whale |
| 56 | May 16, 2009 | Tiger JK, Yoon Mi-rae, Sean, Fly to the Sky, Ran |
| 57 | May 30, 2009 | Jo Sung-mo, Han Ji-hye |
| 58 | June 6, 2009 | Jang Na-ra, Chae Yeon, Jang Hye-jin, Jang Hee-young (Gavy NJ) |
| 59 | June 13, 2009 | Han Young-ae, Lee Seung-chul, Mad Soul Child |
| 60 | June 20, 2009 | 2PM, Kim Ji-sun, Choi Hwa-jung, Cultwo, Kim Chang-ryul, Bae Chil-su, Jun Young-mi |
| 61 | July 4, 2009 | Igudesman & Joo, Clon, Ji Sang-ryeol, Common Ground |
| 62 | July 11, 2009 | Alice In Neverland, Mocca, Lee Jung-hyun, Park Han-byul, IU |
| 63 | July 18, 2009 | Baekdusan, Norazo, Park Hae-mi, Ock Joo-hyun, Yu Seung-chan |
| 64 | July 25, 2009 | Moon Hee-joon, Lee Min-woo, One Two, Navi, Na Yoon-kwon |
| 65 | August 1, 2009 | Nam Sang-mi, F.T. Island, Kim Kyung-ho, So Chan-whee, Son Su-kyung |
| 66 | August 8, 2009 | Kang San-ae, Yoon Do Hyun Band, Hot Potato, Kim Je-dong |
| 67 | August 15, 2009 | Girls' Generation, Cool, Baek Ji-young, Taecyeon |
| 68 | August 29, 2009 | Clazziquai, MC Mong, Eun Ji-won, 2NE1 |
| 69 | September 5, 2009 | Roo'ra, Lee Ji-ah, Brown Eyed Girls, Lazybone |
| 70 | September 12, 2009 | Psy, Kim Jang-hoon |
| 71 | September 19, 2009 | Jewelry, Shimmanyeo, G-Dragon |
| 72 | September 26, 2009 | Tei, Na Yoon-kwon, Lee Min-ki, T-ara, T-MAX |
| 73 | October 10, 2009 | Boohwal, Bada, Hwangbo, Mighty Mouth, Haneul |
| 74 | October 17, 2009 | Unaired Footage Special |
| 75 | October 24, 2009 | 8Eight, Hong Kyung-min, Kim Jung-min, Tani Rumiko, ALi |
| 76 | October 31, 2009 | Kim Bum-soo, Leessang, Jeong Jun-ha, Maya |
| 77 | November 7, 2009 | Seo In-guk, SS501, Park Hyo-shin, Lyn |
| 78 | November 14, 2009 | Kim Jin-pyo, Haneul, Jewelry S, Hwanhee, SHINee, Lee Min-jung, Jung Kyung-ho, The One, Bobby Kim, Kim Bum-soo |
| 79 | November 21, 2009 | K.Will, Wheesung, MC Mong |
| 80 | November 28, 2009 | MC Sniper, Outsider, Hwanhee, Chae Dong-ha, No Brain |
| 81 | December 5, 2009 | Shin Seung-hun, IU, Jung Yeop, Yiruma |
| 82 | December 12, 2009 | Lee Young-hyun (Big Mama), SeeYa, SHINee, Lee Seung-hwan |
| 83 | December 19, 2009 | Park Jin-young, Kim Ah-joong, 2PM |
| 84 | December 26, 2009 | Clazziquai, Brown Eyed Girls, Kara, 4minute, Rainbow, Brian, Supreme Team, Crying Nut |

=== 2010 ===
| Episode # | Original Airdate | Guests |
|---|---|---|
| 85 | January 2, 2010 | Jang Hye-jin, Younha, Yeon Jung-hoon, Han Hye-jin, Epik High, Dok2, MYK, Kang Hye-jung |
| 86 | January 16, 2010 | Park Mi-kyung, Ji Hyun-woo, After School, H-Eugene, KCM, 2NB |
| 87 | January 23, 2010 | Lee Eun-mi, Ivy, Eun Ji-won, Jang Su-won, Sarah Chang |
| 88 | January 30, 2010 | Moon Geun-young, 2AM, f(x), SHINee, Jin Goo |
| 89 | February 6, 2010 | Shin Se-kyung, Cha Tae-hyun, Kim Jong-kook, Hong Kyung-min, Seo In-guk, ALi, Hwayobi, Go Yu-jin |
| 90 | February 20, 2010 | Lisa, Kim Hyung-joong, Im Chang-jung, U-KISS, Gavy NJ |
| 91 | February 27, 2010 | 4Minute, Na Yoon-kwon, IU, Kim Won-jun, Lee Se-jun, Bae Ki-sung, Choi Jae-hun |
| 92 | March 6, 2010 | Min Kyung-hoon (Buzz), CN Blue, Jeon Hye-bin, EB, Hong Kyung-min |
| 93 | March 13, 2010 | Taecyeon, Psy, Kara, Leessang |
| 94 | April 3, 2010 | Wax, Jung Hun-hee, K.Will, Outsider, December |
| 95 | April 10, 2010 | Girls' Generation, 4men, One Two, The Breeze |
| 96 | May 1, 2010 | 2AM, Sweet Sorrow, MATE, Supreme Team, MIJI |
| 97 | May 8, 2010 | Epik High, Jung Yeop, J, TRAX, Kim Heechul, Mr.2 |
| 98 | May 15, 2010 | Yim Jae-beom, Kim Yoon-ah (Jaurim), After School, D.I.A |
| 99 | May 22, 2010 | Must-see and Unaired Footage Special |
| 100 | May 29, 2010 | CN Blue, Rain, SHINee, Park Myeong-su, Gil (Leessang), Tiger JK, Yoon Mi-rae, 2PM |
| 101 | June 5, 2010 | Lee Hyori, FPM, Lee Man-baek, Geum Bi (Turtles) |
| 102 | July 4, 2010 (Note: The show moves to Sunday nights at 12:10AM.) | Lee Seung-hwan, Vibe, Yurisangja, Seo Young-eun, Jung Yeop, Yoari |
| 103 | July 11, 2010 | Lyn, CN Blue, Yoo Jun-sang, Yoo Sun, Hot Potato, Sistar |
| 104 | July 18, 2010 | Son Dam-bi, Kim Soo-ro, T-ara, Joosuk, Mighty Mouth, December, Sinn-K |
| 105 | July 25, 2010 | 2AM, IU, Flower, Bobby Kim, Double K, Gil Hak-mi, Charice |
| 106 | August 1, 2010 | Koo Jun-yup, Kim Yuna, Chae Yeon, Beast, One Two, 2WinS |
| 107 | August 8, 2010 | DJ Doc, Hwayobi, Narsha, Homme |
| 108 | August 15, 2010 | Lee Eun-mi, f(x), V.O.S, Monday Kiz, Lee Eun-hye |
| 109 | August 22, 2010 | BoA, Baby V.O.X., Yoon Jong-shin |
| 110 | August 29, 2010 | Taeyang, Jang Yun-jeong, Eru, JK Kim Dong-wook, Zia, CHESS |
| 111 | September 5, 2010 | Wheesung, Hwanhee, SHINee, Luna, Rottyful Sky, Seo In-guk |
| 112 | September 12, 2010 | Se7en, Secret, Honey Family, JQT |
| 113 | September 19, 2010 | Jo Sung-mo, 4Minute, Song Seung-heon, Rumble Fish, Teen Top |
| 114 | September 26, 2010 | F.T. Island, Song Chang-eui, Park Gun-hyung, Seo Young-eun, K.Will, Killme, Infinite |
| 115 | October 3, 2010 | Boohwal, 2NE1, KCM, Navi |
| 116 | October 10, 2010 | Comeback Madonna Band, Sung Si-kyung, Kim Jong-kook, Ahn Jin-kyung, Kim Seung-soo |
| 117 | October 17, 2010 | Lee Juk, Lim Jung-hee, Jo Kwon, Park Sang-min |
| 118 | October 24, 2010 | SG Wannabe, Brown Eyed Girls, Supreme Team |
| 119 | October 31, 2010 | Younha, Beast, 8Eight |
| 120 | November 7, 2010 | Psy, Miss A, December |
| 121 | November 14, 2010 | Lee Sun-hee, Lee Seung-gi, 2PM |
| 122 | November 21, 2010 | Girls' Generation, 2AM, Yurisangja |
| 123 | November 28, 2010 | Kim Won-jun, Jeong Jun-ha, Im Chang-jung, Yoon Jong-shin, BMK |
| 124 | December 5, 2010 | Kim Jang-hoon, Jung Yeop, V.O.S |
| 125 | December 12, 2010 | T-ara, Seo In-young, Sistar, K.Will |
| 126 | December 19, 2010 | Yang Dong-geun, IU, Lyn, Tim |
| 127 | December 26, 2010 | Shin Seung-hun, Lee Juk, Lena Park |

=== 2011 ===
| Episode # | Original Airdate | Guests |
|---|---|---|
| 128 | January 2, 2011 | Encore Special |
| 129 | January 9, 2011 | Lee Beom-soo, After School, Can |
| 130 | January 16, 2011 | GD & TOP, Secret, Lee Young-hyun, Lee Ji-young |
| 131 | January 23, 2011 | MBLAQ, JeA, Gavy NJ |
| 132 | January 30, 2011 | TVXQ, Park Jung-min, Sweet Sorrow |
| 133 | February 6, 2011 | Seung-ri, Jewelry, Mighty Mouth |
| 134 | February 13, 2011 | Lee Jung, Lee Yeon-hee, Infinite, Teen Top |
| 135 | February 20, 2011 | Park Hye-kyung, San E, Simon Dominic, Hyo-rin, K.Will, Wheesung, G.NA |
| 136 | March 6, 2011 | Kim Hyun-jung, Changmin (2AM), Kim Dong-wan, Ka-hi, Kan Mi-youn, Lee Hyun |
| 137 | March 20, 2011 (Note: 3rd Anniversary Special. Final Episode.) | Lee Seung-hwan, Baek Ji-young, Leessang, CN Blue |

== Similar Programs ==
- SBS Jung Jae-hyung & Lee Hyo-ri's You and I
- KBS Yu Hee-yeol's Sketchbook
- MBC Beautiful Concert (아름다운 콘서트)
