= On Air (TV series) =

2008 South Korean television series

- Promotional poster
- Hangul: 온에어
- RR: Oneeo
- MR: Oneŏ
- Genre: Melodrama; Romance
- Written by: Kim Eun-sook
- Directed by: Shin Woo-chul; Jin Hyuk
- Starring: Kim Ha-neul; Park Yong-ha; Lee Beom-soo; Song Yoon-ah
- Country of origin: South Korea
- Original language: Korean
- No. of episodes: 21

Production
- Executive producer: Go heung-sik (SBS)
- Producer: Yoon Ha rim
- Production locations: Korea, Taiwan
- Running time: Wednesdays and Thursdays at 21:55 (KST)
- Production company: K-Dream

Original release
- Network: SBS TV
- Release: March 5 – May 15, 2008

On Air (Korean: 온에어) is a 2008 South Korean television series, starring Kim Ha-neul, Park Yong-ha, Lee Beom-soo and Song Yoon-ah. The series is a behind-the-scenes look at a fictional television drama, revealing details about what normally goes on behind a TV drama production. It aired on SBS TV from March 5 to May 15, 2008 on Wednesdays and Thursdays at 21:55 for 21 episodes.

== Synopsis ==
Jang Ki-joon (Lee Beom-soo) used to be a top manager in the business but he went bankrupt as he couldn't compete with other powerful agencies. He was 'rescued' by Oh Seung-ah (Kim Ha-neul), a top star who agreed to join his agency after breaking off with her former one. Lee Kyung-min (Park Yong-ha) is a drama PD who gets his first chance at being a director. Seo Young-eun (Song Yoon-ah) is a much sought-after scriptwriter who is divorced and has a young son. On Air revolves around these four entertainment industry figures - a director, a writer, an actress, and her manager - as their personal and professional lives intertwine during the shooting of a drama. It also portrays how the whole production team and performers complete a project in a tight schedule as well as how actors, actresses, and entertainment agencies handle rumors surrounding them.

== Cast ==
=== Main ===
- Kim Ha-neul as Oh Seung-ah
- Park Yong-ha as Lee Kyung-min
- Lee Beom-soo as Jang Ki-joon
- Song Yoon-ah as Seo Young-eun

=== Supporting ===
- Lee Hyung-chul as Jin Sang-woo (SW Entertainment president)
- Han Ye-won as Cherry
- Hong Ji-min as Lee Hye-kyung
- Yoo Seo-jin as Yoon Hyun-soo
- Choi Sang-hoon as Kang Ho-sang
- Lee Won as Kwon Oh-suk
- Lee Sung-min as Song Soo-chul
- Lee Dal-hyung as Park Bong-shik
- Yeo Ho-min as Hong Seo-gyu
- Kim Dong-gyun as Noh Yong-chul
- Park Joo-ah as Park Hyung-ja
- Shin Dong-woo as Kim Joon-hee
- Lee Chul-min as Kim Hak-seon
- Kang Joo-hyung as Ahn Da-jung
- Jin Sung as Lee Won
- Im Hyun-sung as Kim Beom-rae
- Sung Woo-jin as Ra Seok-hyun
- Ricky Kim as Aidan Lee
- Lee Chae-won as Seung-ah's makeup artist
- Lee Kyung-jin as Kwak Wook-shim
- Min Seo-hyun as Yang So-eun
- Kim Do-yeon as Ahn Ji-soo
- Seol Ji-yoon as Writer Kwon
- Kang Rae-yeon as travel guide
- Maeng Bo-hak as movie producer
- Yoon Seol-hee as room salon girl
- Lee Seung-hyung as advertiser
- Son Hwa-ryung
- Kim Sung-oh as SW manager
- Yoon Gi-won as fake manager (ep 1-2)
- Kim Ki-soo as Young-eun's tango teacher (ep 1)

=== Special appearances ===
- Lee Sun-kyun as himself (ep 1)
- Bae Jong-ok as herself (ep 1)
- Park Jin-hee as herself (ep 1)
- Choi Min-hwan as himself (ep 1)
- Lee Hong-gi as himself (ep 1)
- Lee Jae-jin as himself (ep 1)
- Lee Hyo-ri as herself (ep 1)
- Ji Il-joo as Lee Hyo-ri's manager (ep 1)
- Kim Ji-young as herself (ep 1)
- Jeon Do-yeon as herself (ep 2)
- Park Si-yeon as herself (ep 3)
- Lee Chun-hee as himself (ep 3)
- Jeon Hye-bin as herself (ep 3)
- Kim Min-jun as himself (ep 4)
- Kang Hye-jung as herself (ep 5,12)
- Uhm Ji-won as herself (ep 5)
- Lee Seo-jin as himself (ep 9)
- Song Chang-eui as himself (ep 11)
- Lee Dong-gyu as health center employee (ep 14)
- Shin Dong-wook as drama actor (ep 14)
- Kim Je-dong as himself (ep 15)
- Kim Jung-eun as herself (ep 16)
- Yoon Se-ah as screenwriter (ep 21)
- Kim Sung-min as manager (ep 21)
- Hines Ward as himself (ep 21)

== Production ==
The series features 27 cameo appearances, among them are Jeon Do-yeon, Kim Jung-eun, Lee Seo-jin, Kim Min-jun and Yoon Se-ah, who had previously worked with writer Kim Eun-sook and director Shin Woo-chul on Lovers in Paris, Lovers in Prague, and Lovers. Song Yoon-ah also asked her celebrity friends to appear on the show, namely Lee Hyori, Kang Hye-jung, Uhm Ji-won, and comedian Kim Je-dong.

Parts of the series were filmed on location in Taiwan, where the character Lee Kyung-min goes in search of Seo Young-eun, who went to Taiwan on vacation.

== Soundtrack ==
Information

- Title: 온에어 OST Part 2 / On Air OST Part 2
- Artist: Various Artists
- Language: Korean, English
- Release Date: 2008-Apr-29
- Number of Tracks: 11
- Publisher: Unknown
- Agency: Sony Music

Track Listing

No.	Song title	Artist
1.	Island	Lee Beom-soo
2.	Sky Love	Kim Ha-neul
3.	A Person Like Me	Cyndi feat. Amen
4.	Heartbroken (Bossanova Ver.)	Choi Hoon
5.	One Word (Guitar Ver.)	Han Sung-ho
6.	Haneuleul Gareumyeo	Kim Dong-hyuk
7.	Rainbow Soap	Leenyum
8.	Duryeowoom Apeseo	Kim Bo-min
9.	Yariya (Inst.)	Park Se-joon
10.	Think About You	Kim Dong-hyuk
11.	Yariya	Han Ye-won

== Awards and nominations ==
Year	Award	Category	Recipient	Result
2008	2nd Korea Drama Awards	Top Excellence Award, Actress	Kim Ha-neul	Won
2008	SBS Drama Awards	Top 10 Stars	Kim Ha-neul	Won
2008	SBS Drama Awards	Top 10 Stars	Song Yoon-ah	Won
2008	SBS Drama Awards	Top 10 Stars	Park Yong-ha	Won
2008	SBS Drama Awards	Best Supporting Actor in a Drama Special	Lee Hyung-chul	Nominated
2008	SBS Drama Awards	Best Supporting Actress in a Drama Special	Hong Ji-min	Nominated
2008	SBS Drama Awards	Excellence Award, Actor in a Drama Special	Park Yong-ha	Won
2008	SBS Drama Awards	Top Excellence Award, Actor	Lee Beom-soo	Nominated
2008	SBS Drama Awards	Top Excellence Award, Actress	Kim Ha-neul	Won
2008	SBS Drama Awards	Top Excellence Award, Actress	Song Yoon-ah	Won
2009	45th Baeksang Arts Awards	Best Screenplay (TV)	Kim Eun-sook	Nominated
2009	45th Baeksang Arts Awards	Best New Actress (TV)	Han Ye-won	Nominated
2009	45th Baeksang Arts Awards	Best Actor (TV)	Park Yong-ha	Nominated
2009	45th Baeksang Arts Awards	Best Director (TV)	Shin Woo-chul	Won
2009	45th Baeksang Arts Awards	Best Drama	On Air	Nominated

== International broadcast ==
The series aired on Mnet Japan beginning July 30, 2008. Park Yong-ha and Song Yoon-ah visited Japan to promote it in a showcase attend by 800 VIP guests at Toho Cinema in Roppongi Hills, Tokyo.
