= Grand Hyatt Seoul =

Hotel in Seoul, South Korea

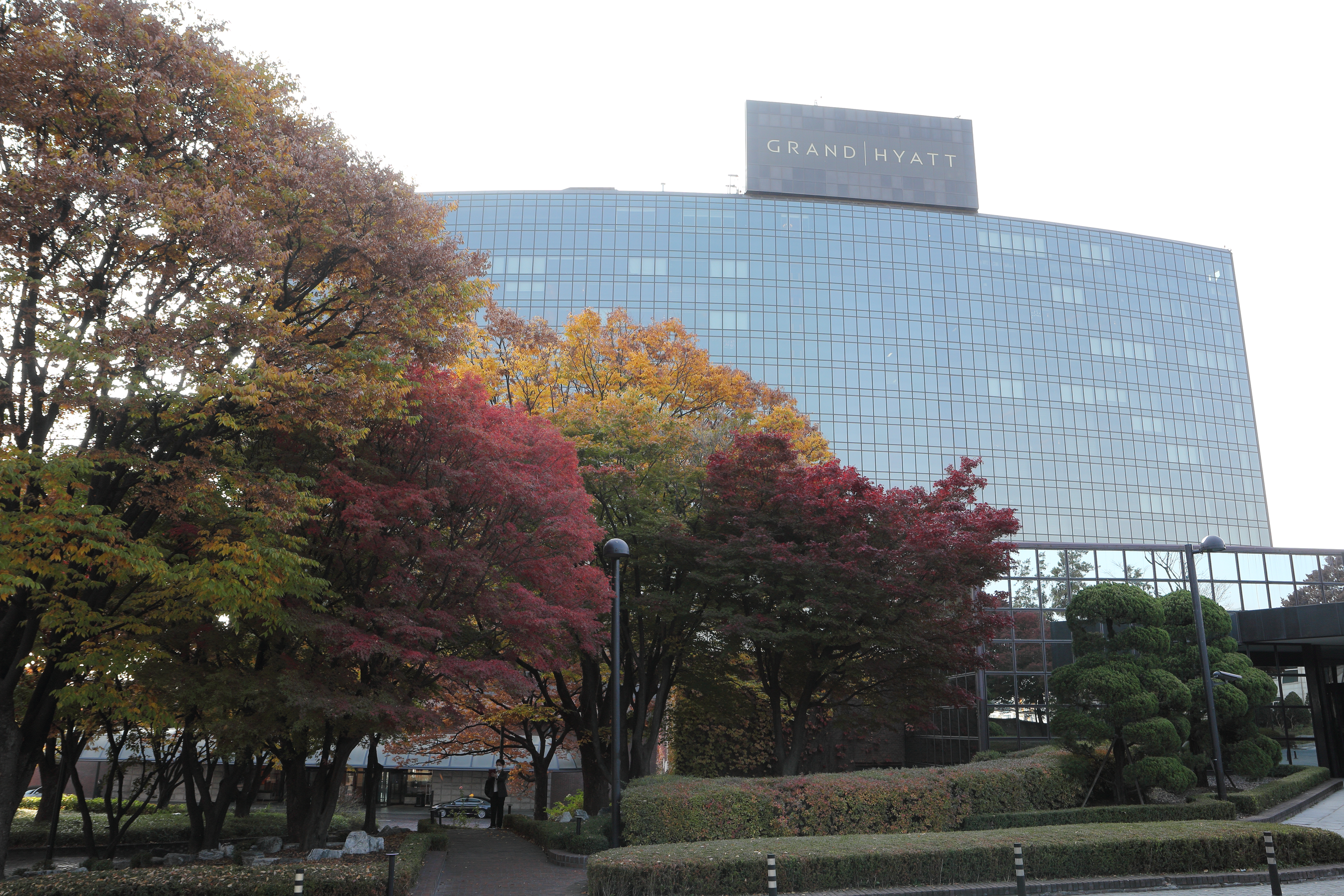
- Grand Hyatt Seoul exterior

- Location in Seoul
- Hotel chain: Hyatt

General information
- Location: Yongsan, Seoul, South Korea
- Coordinates: 37°32′21″N 126°59′51″E
- Opening: 1978

Technical details
- Floor count: 20

Other information
- Number of rooms: 616
- Number of restaurants: 11

Website
- https://www.hyatt.com/grand-hyatt/en-US/selrs-grand-hyatt-seoul (English)

The Grand Hyatt Seoul is a 5 star Hyatt hotel in Seoul, South Korea. Located in landscaped gardens in Yongsan district, on the historic Mount Namsan, the hotel has 615 rooms and suites and several F&B outlets. It first opened in 1978 as Hyatt Regency Seoul, which was the first Hyatt hotel chain to open in Korea, and changed to Grand Hyatt Seoul in 1993.

== Facilities ==
A variety of fine cuisines are offered in the hotel's 11 restaurants and bars, each showcasing its unique style and authenticity.

The Presidential Suite is 325 square-meter with seven rooms and floor-to-ceiling windows on the 20th floor which provide sprawling skyline views of Seoul.

== In media ==
The hotel was used as the filming location for Seoul Broadcasting System (SBS)'s drama Lovers in Paris, namely the swimming pool, the lobby where the two leads kiss, The Paris Bar, where male lead, Han Ki-joo played by Park Shin-yang sang to Kang Tae-young played by Kim Jung-eun, J.J. Mahoney's, where the college hockey party held and the grand ballroom, where the engagement ceremony was held.

== See also ==
- Yongsan International School of Seoul
- Namsan (Seoul)
