= K-Club =

K-Club can refer to:

- The K Club, a golf and leisure complex in Ireland
- An ethnic Korean or Korean American nightclub in the United States, such as Le Prive
- K-Club (programme), children's television programme, formerly presented by JLS singer Marvin Humes
