= Kim Eun-sook =

South Korean screenwriter (born 1973)

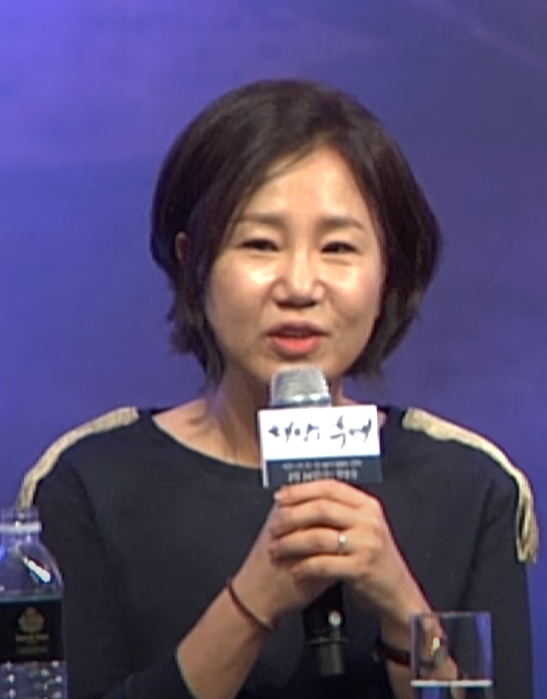
- Kim in 2016
- Born: 1973 (age 52–53); Gangneung, Gangwon Province, South Korea
- Education: Seoul Institute of the Arts – Creative Writing
- Occupation: Screenwriter
- Years active: 2003–present
- Agent: Hwa&Dam Pictures (subsidiary of Studio Dragon)
- Spouse: Choi Sang-hyun

Korean name
- Hangul: 김은숙
- Hanja: 金銀淑
- RR: Gim Eunsuk
- MR: Kim Ŭnsuk

Kim Eun-sook (Korean: 김은숙; born 1973) is a South Korean screenwriter. She wrote the popular television dramas Lovers in Paris (2004), Secret Garden (2010), A Gentleman's Dignity (2012), The Heirs (2013), Descendants of the Sun (2016), Guardian: The Lonely and Great God (2016–2017), Mr. Sunshine (2018), The King: Eternal Monarch (2020),The Glory (2022–2023) and Genie, Make a Wish (2025).

== Career ==
=== Lovers "trilogy" and film debut ===
Kim first gained attention when her television drama Lovers in Paris became a major hit in the summer of 2004, with viewership ratings averaging 41.3% and a peak of 57.6% (#11 highest rated of all time). The cast and crew flew to France to film several scenes in Paris and Nice, igniting a trend among Korean dramas for overseas location shoots. A Cinderella-like story of a cheerful, ordinary girl who becomes the housekeeper of a cold and suave businessman, lead actors Park Shin-yang and Kim Jung-eun shared the Grand Prize ("Daesang") at the 2004 SBS Drama Awards. Then at the 2005 Baeksang Arts Awards, Lovers in Paris won the following awards: the Daesang, Best TV Actress for Kim Jung-eun, and Best TV Screenplay for Kim Eun-sook and Kang Eun-jung. It also became popular internationally, and Kim Jung-eun was named Best Actress at the 2005 Asian Television Awards.

Kim chose another European setting for her next drama, Lovers in Prague (2005). In a gender reversal, Jeon Do-yeon played a diplomat in Prague, Czech Republic, who falls in love with a police detective, played by Kim Joo-hyuk. Kim Eun-sook said she wanted to feature a romance in which the woman's social status is higher than her partner, and wanted to make the social difference between the two main characters as extreme as possible by also making the heroine the daughter of the president of South Korea. Kim added, "Although some might say it is another unrealistic story, a drama is a drama. I just want to make people enjoy the fantasy." Jeon won the Daesang at the 2005 SBS Drama Awards, and Kim Joo-hyuk won Best TV Actor at the 2006 Baeksang Arts Awards.

Kim tried her hand at writing for the big screen in the 2006 melodrama Fly High (also known as Loving is Okay). Directed by Kwak Ji-kyoon, it starred Ji Hyun-woo as a high school student who falls for a girl with a terminal illness (Im Jung-eun). The film was a critical and box office disappointment, and Kim soon returned to her milieu, television.

Despite overseas shoots in Hainan, China, the conclusion to Kim's loosely named "Lovers trilogy" was simply titled Lovers (2006–2007). Based on the Lee Man-hee stage play Turn Around and Leave (that also inspired the 1998 film A Promise), Kim again cast Kim Jung-eun, this time opposite Lee Seo-jin, as they played a plastic surgeon and a gangster entering into an unlikely romance. Though not as successful as its predecessors, Lovers recorded solid ratings in the high teens to low-20s.

=== On entertainment, politics, and body-swapping ===
Kim's next drama, On Air (2008), revolved around four entertainment industry figures - a newbie TV director (Park Yong-ha), an established screenwriter (Song Yun-ah, as Kim's alter-ego), a diva actress (Kim Ha-neul), and her struggling manager (Lee Beom-soo), whose personal and professional lives intertwine during the shooting of a fictional TV drama. Filled with cameos and a gossipy, insider look at stars behind the scenes, On Air was a hit, and director Shin Woo-chul (in his fourth collaboration with Kim) won Best TV Director at the 2009 Baeksang Arts Awards.

In City Hall (2009), Cha Seung-won played an elite deputy mayor with presidential aspirations who unexpectedly falls for an unwitting female government employee-turned-town mayor (Kim Sun-a). Though she left space in the script for Cha and Kim to ad-lib, Kim Eun-sook called it her funniest work. She said she used politics as a backdrop for the romance to show her idealism regarding public officials.

A love story between the rich, arrogant and eccentric president of a department store (Hyun Bin) and a brave but sweet stunt woman (Ha Ji-won) whose bodies switch souls whenever it rains, Secret Garden (2010–2011) became one of the biggest hits of Kim's career. After writing six dramas, Kim said she "contemplated on whether to write a drama that benefits the world or one that will garner good ratings" and decided to "abandon the depth I showed in City Hall" (which recorded solid, if unimpressive, ratings in the high teens). Instead, she "made an easy, light drama for the whole family to enjoy on weekends," and intentionally wrote it "to be fun." Secret Garden won Best TV Drama at the 2011 Baeksang Arts Awards, as well as Best TV Screenplay for Kim, Best New TV Actress for Yoo In-na, and the Daesang for Hyun. Kim also won Best Writer at the Seoul International Drama Awards, the Korea Drama Awards, and the Korea Content Awards.

=== Jang Dong-gun's TV comeback ===
By this time, the writer-director duo of Kim and Shin had gained a reputation for making hits, and their projects attracted high-profile actors. In 2012, after 12 years of acting in films, superstar Jang Dong-gun made his television comeback in A Gentleman's Dignity. Jang said that Kim and Shin's involvement in the project influenced his decision. After repeatedly alluding to him in On Air, Kim confessed her "ulterior motives" that she had really wanted to work on a drama with Jang. She and the crew were so determined to cast him in the lead that not only was the airdate moved back from March to late May to accommodate his schedule, but Kim, in the hopes of getting him to take the role, lied to Jang's wife, actress Ko So-young that there would be no kissing scenes. Instead, Kim wrote racy and sexy scenes, as befitting what has been called a "40-year-old, male version of Sex and the City." The drama portrayed the humorous love lives of a group of close-knit male friends played by Jang, Kim Min-jong, Kim Soo-ro, and Lee Jong-hyuk, and previous On Air star Kim Ha-neul played Jang's love interest.

=== The Heirs ===
Kim said she wrote the hero of 2013 drama He Who Wishes To Wear the Crown Endures Its Weight: Heirs (also known as The Heirs or The Inheritors, 2013) specifically for actor Lee Min-ho. He starred opposite Park Shin-hye in a Gossip Girl-esque trendy drama set in a high school populated by the uber-rich. Kim said the biggest difference was writing about 18-year-olds when her previous characters had been in their thirties and forties, calling The Heirs "a teen romance for grown-ups". She admitted that she utilizes clichés, "but all my previous works used plenty of cliches and were embraced by audiences. The key is making characters that are different, so the audience forgets the clichéd setting. That's what I'm good at, and that is what I find fun. I want people to think, 'I've seen something like this before, but still this is strangely fun.'"

=== Descendants of the Sun and pre-produced dramas ===
Three years since The Heirs, Kim Eun-sook announced that she would be coming back with a human melodrama about a man and a woman who bond gradually as they save lives in disaster zones and end up falling in love. Titled Descendants of the Sun, the drama starred Song Joong-ki in his first television drama after military discharge along with Song Hye-kyo. Set in the fictional world of Uruk, Song Joong-ki plays a special forces captain who juggles peacekeeping duties with wooing a surgeon played by Song Hye-kyo. The military drama gained huge success and received immense popularity across Asia. It has given rise to the popularity of Korean soldier talk. The show also contributed to the rise of tourism in Greece, where scenes of the drama were shot.

The success of Descendants saw a change in tide toward pre-produced Korean dramas. However, in an interview, Kim Won-seok (co-writer of Descendants) stated that said there were some parts that could have been improved on if the show had been shot as it was being aired, per local industry norm.

Following the success of Descendants of the Sun, Kim Eun-sook wrote her next two dramas, Guardian: The Lonely and Great God and Mr. Sunshine for cable network TVN in 2016 and 2018. Both dramas held the highest average nationwide ratings recorded for cable dramas—12.955% for Mr. Sunshine, and 12.428% for Guardian: The Lonely and Great God—until the former's two-year long record was broken by The World of the Married in 2020.

Kim Eun-sook returned to free-to-air television with the series The King: Eternal Monarch on SBS. She worked again with Lee Min-ho of The Heirs and Kim Go-eun of Guardian: The Lonely and Great God in the leading roles. After premiering with a promising double-digit rating of 10.1%, the drama peaked at 11.6% for the second episode but ratings slid to as low as 5.2% during the eleventh episode, the lowest ever recorded for her works including her cable dramas with the series received criticisms for its screenplay, direction and editing, leading to lower-than-expected domestic popularity in Korea.

Kim reunited with Descendants of the Sun star Song Hye-kyo in the Netflix's series The Glory. The revenge series revolves around a victim of brutal high school bullying who dedicates her adulthood to plot revenge against perpetrators. It was released in two parts: Part 1 on December 30, 2022, and Part 2 on March 10, 2023.

=== Critical assessment ===
Kim's trademark is slick and glossy romantic comedies with fast-flying banter. Some critics have opined that Kim writes shallow characters, and she is as polarizing as she is successful. But not only do most of her dramas appeal to a wide age range of viewers and receive high ratings, but they often have that extra element that make them pop-culture buzz projects, whether it's due to a particularly catchy line of dialogue or a recurring joke.

In 2012, she received a Lifetime Achievement Award at the SBS Drama Awards.

== Philanthropy ==
On March 10, 2022, Kim made a donation ₩60 millions to the Hope Bridge Disaster Relief Association to help the victims of the massive wildfire that started in Uljin, Gyeongbuk and has spread to Samcheok, Gangwon. and donated money ₩40 millions to help victims of the Russian invasion of Ukraine.

On August 17, 2022, Kim donated ₩20 million to help those affected by the 2022 South Korean floods through the Hope Bridge Korea Disaster Relief Association.

On March 7, 2023, Kim donated ₩20 million to the Hope Bridge National Disaster Relief Association to help in the restoration of Guryeong Village after a fire. Kim donated together with Hwa&Dam Pictures CEO Yoon Ha-rim; each donated ₩20 million each, for a total of ₩40 million.

== Filmography ==
=== Film ===
Year	Title	Director	Ref.
2006	Fly High (사랑하니까, 괜찮아)	Kwak Ji-kyoon	
2006	A Millionaire's First Love	Kim Tae-kyun	

=== Television ===
Year	Title	Director	Ref.
2003	South of the Sun	Kim Soo-ryong	
2004	Lovers in Paris	Shin Woo-chul	
2005	Lovers in Prague	Shin Woo-chul	
2006	Lovers	Shin Woo-chul	
2008	On Air	Shin Woo-chul	
2009	The City Hall	Shin Woo-chul	
2010	Secret Garden	Shin Woo-chul	
2012	A Gentleman's Dignity	Shin Woo-chul; Kwon Hyeok-chan	
2013	The Heirs	Kang Shin-hyo; Boo Sung-chul	
2016	Descendants of the Sun	Lee Eung-bok; Baek Sang-hoon	
2016–2017	Guardian: The Lonely and Great God	Lee Eung-bok (Ep. 1–16); Kwon Hyuk-chan (Ep. 5–16); Yoon Jong-ho (Ep. 3–16)	
2018	Mr. Sunshine	Lee Eung-bok	
2020	The King: Eternal Monarch	Baek Sang-hoon; Jung Ji-hyun; Yoo Je-won	
2022–2023	The Glory	Ahn Gil-ho	
2025	Genie, Make a Wish	Ahn Gil-ho; Lee Byeong-heon	

== Accolades ==
=== Awards and nominations ===
Awards and nominations
Year	Ceremony	Category	Work	Result	Ref.
2005	45th Baeksang Arts Awards	Grandprize	Lovers in Paris	Won	
2005	45th Baeksang Arts Awards	Best TV Screenplay	Lovers in Paris	Won	
2009	SBS First Half of the Year Award: Special Award Ceremony	Special awards	On Air	Won	
2009	41st Baeksang Arts Awards	Best TV Screenplay	On Air	Nominated	
2009	SBS First Half of the Year Award: Special Award Ceremony	Special awards	The City Hall	Won	
2011	47th Baeksang Arts Awards	Best TV Screenplay	Secret Garden	Won	
2011	4th Korea Drama Awards	Best Writer	Secret Garden	Won	
2011	6th Seoul International Drama Awards	Outstanding Korean Screenwriter	Secret Garden	Won	
2011	SBS First Half of the Year Award: Special Award Ceremony	Special Award	Secret Garden	Won	
2012	2012 SBS Drama Awards	Achievement Award	A Gentleman's Dignity	Won	
2014	2nd Asia Rainbow TV Awards	Outstanding Scriptwriter	The Heirs	Won	
2016	52nd Baeksang Arts Awards	Grand Prize (TV)	Descendants of the Sun (Note: Awards or Nomination shared with Kim Won-seok)	Won	
2016	52nd Baeksang Arts Awards	Best Drama	Descendants of the Sun	Nominated	
2016	52nd Baeksang Arts Awards	Best Scriptwriter (TV)	Descendants of the Sun	Nominated	
2016	43rd Korean Broadcasting Grand Prize	Best Drama	Descendants of the Sun	Won	
2016	11th Seoul International Drama Awards	Excellent Korean Drama	Descendants of the Sun	Won	
2016	5th APAN Star Awards	Drama of the Year	Descendants of the Sun	Won	
2016	9th Korea Drama Awards	Best Drama	Descendants of the Sun	Won	
2016	9th Korea Drama Awards	Best Drama Writer	Descendants of the Sun	Nominated	
2016	Korean Advertisers Association Awards	Best Drama	Descendants of the Sun	Won	
2016	21st Asian Television Awards	Best Drama Series	Descendants of the Sun	Won	
2016	30th KBS Drama Awards	Best Screenwriter	Descendants of the Sun	Won	
2017	50th WorldFest-Houston International Film Festival	Special Jury Award (TV series)	Descendants of the Sun	Won	
2017	53rd Baeksang Arts Awards	Grand Prize (Television)	Guardian: The Lonely and Great God	Won	
2017	Seoul Institute of the Arts Alumni Association	Light of Life Award	Kim Eun-sook	Won	
2019	55th Baeksang Arts Awards	Best TV Screenplay	Mr. Sunshine	Nominated	
2023	59th Baeksang Arts Awards	Grand Prize – Television	The Glory	Nominated	
2023	59th Baeksang Arts Awards	Grand Prize – Television	The Glory	Nominated	
2023	59th Baeksang Arts Awards	Best Drama	The Glory	Won	
2023	59th Baeksang Arts Awards	Best Screenplay	The Glory	Nominated	
2023	Asian Academy Creative Awards	Best Screenplay (National Winners – Korea)	The Glory	Won	
2023	36th Korean Broadcast Writer Award (Note: Korean Broadcast Writer Award hosted by the Korea Broadcast Writers Association)	Best Writer (Television Drama)	The Glory	Won	

=== State honors ===
Name of country, year given, and name of honor
Country	Award Ceremony	Year	Honor	Ref.
South Korea	3rd Korean Content Awards (Note: Honors are given at the Korean Content Awards (대한민국 콘텐츠 대상) arranged by the Korea Creative Content Agency and hosted by the Ministry of Culture, Sports and Tourism. The Korea Content Awards Ceremony, which started in 2009, aims to inspire pride in the content industry and develop the Korean cultural content industry by discovering and awarding contributors and excellent content that have contributed to the development of the content industry in 2022. It is a place to promote. The winners (works) of honor, which are recommended through the website of the Korea Creative Content Agency (www.kocca.kr) and announced through careful examination by experts and three-step verification, play a leading role in shining the Korean content industry in the world.)	2011	Prime Minister's Commendation in the Field of Broadcasting for Secret Garden	
South Korea	7th Korean Popular Culture and Arts Awards	2017	Prime Minister's Commendation	

=== Listicle ===
Name of publisher, year listed, name of listicle, and placement
Publisher	Year	List	Placement	Ref.
KBS	2023	The 50 people who made KBS shine	14th	
