= Park Eun-ooh =

South Korean singer (born 1990)

- Born: March 30, 1990 (age 36); Daejeon, South Korea
- Genres: K-pop
- Occupations: Singer-songwriter; producer
- Instrument: Vocals
- Years active: 2007–present

Korean name
- Hangul: 박은우
- Hanja: 朴恩佑
- RR: Bak Eunu
- MR: Pak Ŭnu

Park Eun-ooh (Korean: 박은우; born March 30, 1990), also known as NewNew, is a South Korean singer-songwriter, music producer and lyricist.

== History ==
=== 2000s ===
Park Eun-ooh made her debut as a singer in 2007 with her stage name Xeno(제노) and published her first album "Seventeen Xeno". In 2008, her live performance "Who are you? sexy My Boy" in which she was portrayed as a cross-dressing girl became a hit for her masculine voice and dance. However, she made her comeback within 2 weeks on another live in maiden dress where she totally reversed her previous image. She later on changed her stage name from Xeno to Eun-ooh.

=== 2010s ===
In the 2010s, Eun-ooh switched her focus from being a singer to mainly working as a composer, songwriter, vocalist, and producer for K-pop music and Korean TV series. For example, she worked on the OST "Everyday" for Korean Drama A Gentleman's Dignity in 2012. Since then, she has been writing melodies, lyrics, and helped produce songs for some of South Korea's best known K-pop artists, such as Sistar, BoA, and Jun Hyo Seong.

== Discography ==
=== Singles ===
+Niga Mwonde(니가 뭔데)- July 20, 2007

+Who are you? sexy my boy! – March 7, 2008

+Naege Dasi(내게 다시) – June 23, 2008

+Woori Ai(우리아이) – March 15, 2013

=== Soundtracks ===
+A Gentleman's Dignity OST Part 2 – "Everyday" – June 3, 2012

=== Albums ===
+Seventeen Xeno – September 20, 2007

== Songwriter/Lyricist/Producer Discography ==
=== K-POP ===
==== Secret Number ====
- Holiday [from "Who Dis? - Single"]
- Privacy [from "Got That Boom - Single"]
- Dangerous In Love [from "Fire Saturday - Single"]

==== ShaFLA ====
- Ddu-Ru-Ddu-Ppa-Ra-Ppa

==== Jun Hyo Seong ====
- Dear moon
- Hello
- Follow me
- I got you
- Taxi Driver
- How Can I

==== SONAMOO ====
- Round N Round
- Liar
- I do love you
- Closer
- Into Me

==== Secret ====
- U R Fired

==== Song Ji Eun (Secret) ====
- JANUS (Intro.) [from Mini Album - "25"]
- La Boum [from Mini Album - "25"]

==== Shin Hye Sung ====
- Pretty Girl

==== B.A.P ====
- Today

==== Wonder Girls ====
- Sorry [from Mini Album - "Wonder Party"]

==== Lee Jong Hyun (CNBLUE) & JUNIEL ====
- Love Falls

==== IVY ====
- Firefly [from Mini Album - "Interview"]
- Like a movie [from Mini Album - "Interview"]

==== Ailee ====
- Filling Up My Glass (Co-produced by 'Lee Jong Hyun(CNBLUE)')

==== EXID ====
- Wi Are/Up & Down (Chinese version)
- Cream (Chinese version)

==== BoA ====
- Hurricane Venus
- Adrenaline

==== Sistar ====
- SHAKE IT
- Don't Be Such A Baby (Feat. Giriboy)
- TOUCH MY BODY
- I Swear
- Naughty Hands (Feat. Verbal Jint)
- I Choose To Love You
- SoYou X JunggiGo - Some (feat. Lil Boi of Geeks)
- SoYou, Kwon Soonil, Park Yongin(Urban Zakapa) - The Space Between[Ssum]
- SoYou X Kwon Jung Yeol - Lean On Me
- SoYou, Giriboy - Pillow (Feat. KIHYUN)
- SoYou, Mad Clown - Stupid In Love
- San E, Hyolyn - Coach Me (Feat. Joo Heon)
- Hyolyn - Lonely

==== WJSN (Cosmic Girls) ====
- Closer to you
- Secret / Mo Mo Mo / Catch me [not verified]

==== 4Minute ====
- Gayoon & HyunA (4Minute) - Come In [from "4Minute World" (5th Mini Album)]

=== KOREAN DRAMA OST ===
- Kim Feel - Neighborhood Lawyer Jo Deul Ho OST (Walk to the sky)
- Tiffany(Girls' Generation) - Only one - BLOOD OST
- M.C The Max - U - It's Okay, That's Love OST Part. 7
- G.NA - SECRET - The Night Watchman's Journal OST
- Future Choice - Jung Yong Hwa(CNBLUE), Yoon Eun Hye(Actress), Lee Dong Gun(Actor)
- Ken(VIXX) - In The Name Of Love (English ver.) - The Heirs OST
- Zion - Never Love Me - Bride of The Sun OST Part 1

=== J-POP ===
==== Song Ji Eun (Secret) ====
- La Boum (Japanese Version)

==== N.Flying ====
- Kiss me, Miss me
- Bitter Sweet
