= Yoon Jin-yi =

South Korean actress (born 1990)

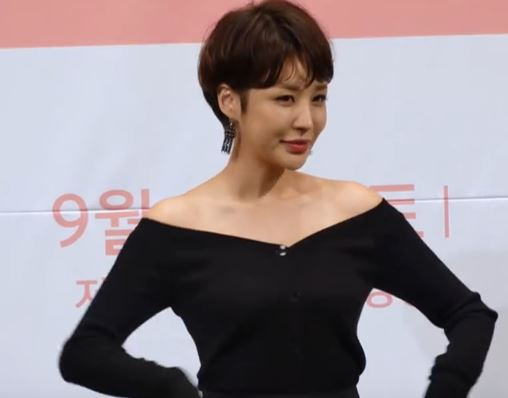
- Born: Kim Yoon-jin; July 27, 1990 (age 36); Daejeon, South Korea
- Education: Sejong University – Department of Film Arts
- Occupation: Actress
- Years active: 2012–present
- Agent: Management Redwoods
- Spouse: Kim Tae-geun (m. 2022)
- Children: 2

Korean name
- Hangul: 김윤진
- RR: Gim Yunjin
- MR: Kim Yunjin

Stage name
- Hangul: 윤진이
- RR: Yun Jini
- MR: Yun Chini

Kim Yoon-jin (Korean: 김윤진; born July 27, 1990), better known her stage name Yoon Jin-yi, is a South Korean actress.

== Career ==
Yoon debuted in the 2012 romantic comedy TV series A Gentleman's Dignity, playing a girl in love with an older man.

In March 2019, Yoon signed with new agency HB Entertainment.

In March 2021, Yoon signed with Management Redwoods after her contract with HB expired.

== Personal life ==
On August 25, 2022, it was announced that Yoon is getting married with her non-celebrity boyfriend. The private wedding was held on October 22, 2022 in Bukchon Hanok Village. She gave birth to a daughter on March 31, 2023. Yoon announced her second pregnancy on September 28, 2024. On February 24, 2025, the couple welcomed their second daughter.

== Filmography ==
=== Film ===
Year	Title	Role	Notes	Ref.
2014	We Are Brothers	Yang Yeo-il		
2015	Helios	Shin Mi-kyung		

=== Television series ===
Year	Title	Role	Notes	Ref.
2012	A Gentleman's Dignity	Im Mea-ri		
2013	Special Affairs Team TEN 2	Hostess at Karaoke	Cameo (Episode 10)	
2013	The Fugitive of Joseon	So Baek		
2013	Reply 1994	Jin-yi / "Die Die"	Cameo (Episode 16–17)	
2014	It's Okay, That's Love	Lee Pool-ip	Cameo (Episode 1–2)	
2014	Discovery of Love	Ahn Ah-rim		
2016	Happy Home	Joo Se-ri		
2016	The Sound of Your Heart	Fake Ae-bong	Cameo (Episode 7–8)	
2017	Han Yeo-Reum's Memory	Yoon Hye-ri		
2018–2019	My Only One	Jang Da-ya		
2021–2022	Young Lady and Gentleman	Lee Se-ryeon		

=== Music video appearances ===
Year	Song title	Artist
2013	"Stealer"	Kang Seung-yoon

== Awards and nominations ==
Name of the award ceremony, year presented, category, nominee of the award, and the result of the nomination
Award ceremony	Year	Category	Nominee / Work	Result	Ref.
Asia Model Awards	2013	New Star Award, Actress	A Gentleman's Dignity	Won	
Baeksang Arts Awards	2013	Best New Actress – Television	A Gentleman's Dignity	Nominated	
KBS Drama Awards	2018	Best Supporting Actress	My Only One	Won	
K-Drama Star Awards	2012	Rising Star Award	A Gentleman's Dignity	Won	
Korea Drama Awards	2012	Best New Actress	A Gentleman's Dignity	Won	
SBS Drama Awards	2012	New Star Award	A Gentleman's Dignity	Won	
SBS Drama Awards	2012	Best Couple	Yoon Jin-yi (with Kim Min-jong); A Gentleman's Dignity	Won	
