= Shin Woo-chul =

South Korean television director

- 신우철
- Born: South Korea
- Occupation: Television director
- Years active: 2004-present
- Agent: SM Life Design Group

Korean name
- Hangul: 신우철
- RR: Sin Ucheol
- MR: Sin Uch'ŏl

Shin Woo-chul (Korean: 신우철) is a South Korean television director. He is best known as the director of the trilogy Lovers (2004–07) created by Kim Eun-sook.

Other works include On Air (2008), The City Hall (2009), the hit drama Secret Garden (2010), A Gentleman's Dignity (2012), Gu Family Book (2013), and the international hits Where Stars Land (2018) and Melting Me Softly (2019).

== Filmography ==
=== Television ===
Title	Korean title	Broadcast period
Lovers in Paris	파리의 연인	June 12, 2004 – August 15, 2004
Lovers in Prague	프라하의 연인	September 24, 2005 – November 20, 2005
Lovers	연인	November 8, 2006 – January 11, 2007
On Air	온에어	March 5, 2008 – May 15, 2008
The City Hall	시티홀	April 29, 2009 – July 2, 2009
Secret Garden	시크릿 가든	November 13, 2010 – January 16, 2011
When Women Powder Twice	여자가 두번 화장할 때	December 5, 2011 – March 7, 2012
A Gentleman's Dignity	신사의 품격	May 26, 2012 – August 12, 2012
Gu Family Book	구가의 서	April 8, 2013 – June 25, 2013
Where Stars Land	여우각시별	October 1, 2018 – November 26, 2018
Investiture of the Gods	Chinese: 封神演义	April 9, 2019
Melting Me Softly	날 녹여주오	September 28, 2019 – November 17, 2019

== Awards ==
Year	Award	Category	Nominated work	Result
2005	41st Baeksang Arts Awards	Best Director	Lovers in Paris	Nominated
2005	41st Baeksang Arts Awards	Best New Director	Lovers in Paris	Nominated
2009	45th Baeksang Arts Awards	Best Director	On Air	Won
2011	47th Baeksang Arts Awards	Best Director	Secret Garden	Nominated
2011	4th Korea Drama Awards	Best Production Director	Secret Garden	Won
