= 41st Baeksang Arts Awards =

2005 South Korean award ceremony

- Date: May 20, 2005
- Site: Little Angels Performing Arts Center, Seoul
- Hosted by: Park Soo-hong; Lee Hye-seung

Television coverage
- Network: SBS

The 41st Baeksang Arts Awards ceremony took place on May 20, 2005 at the Little Angels Performing Arts Center in Seoul. Presented by IS Plus Corp., it was broadcast on SBS and hosted by comedian Park Soo-hong and announcer Lee Hye-seung.

== Nominations and winners ==
Complete list of nominees and winners:

(Winners denoted in bold)

=== Film ===
Grand Prize (Film)	Best Film
**Marathon**	**The President's Last Bang**; 3-Iron; Marathon
Best Director (Film)	Best New Director (Film)
**Park Heung-sik** - **My Mother, the Mermaid**; Im Sang-soo - The President's Last Bang; Kim Ki-duk - 3-Iron	**Kim Soo-hyun** - **So Cute**; Jeong Yoon-cheol - Marathon; Noh Dong-seok - My Generation
Best Actor (Film)	Best Actress (Film)
**Cho Seung-woo** - **Marathon**; Baek Yoon-sik - The President's Last Bang; Han Suk-kyu - The President's Last Bang	**Kim Hye-soo** - **Hypnotized**; Jeon Do-yeon - My Mother, the Mermaid; Lee Eun-ju - The Scarlet Letter
Best New Actor (Film)	Best New Actress (Film)
**Yoon Kye-sang** - **Flying Boys**; Jae Hee - 3-Iron; Park Sun-woo - So Cute	**Soo Ae** - **A Family**; Kim Ji-soo - This Charming Girl; Lee Se-young - Lovely Rivals
Best Screenplay (Film)	Most Popular - Actor (Film)
**Jeong Yoon-cheol** - **Marathon**; Im Sang-soo - The President's Last Bang; Jang Jin - Someone Special	**Gang Dong-won** - **Duelist**; **Kim Rae-won** - **My Little Bride**; **Lee Dong-gun** - **My Boyfriend Is Type B**

=== Television ===
Grand Prize (Television)
**Lovers in Paris**
Best Drama	Best Director (Television)
**I'm Sorry, I Love You**; Bad Housewife; Be Strong, Geum-soon!; Immortal Admiral Yi Sun-sin; Ireland; Lovers in Paris	**Lee Sung-joo** - **Immortal Admiral Yi Sun-sin**; Lee Hyung-min - I'm Sorry, I Love You; Shin Woo-chul - Lovers in Paris
Best Educational Program	Best Entertainment Program
**The Conker Tree**	**Hello Franceska**; People Looking for a Laugh; Vitamin
Best Actor (Television)	Best Actress (Television)
**So Ji-sub** - **I'm Sorry, I Love You**; Kim Myung-min - Immortal Admiral Yi Sun-sin; Park Shin-yang - Lovers in Paris	**Kim Jung-eun** - **Lovers in Paris**; Go Hyun-jung - Spring Day; Song Hye-kyo - Full House
Best New Actor (Television)	Best New Actress (Television)
**Eric Mun** - **Super Rookie**; Hyun Bin - Ireland; Jae Hee - Sassy Girl Chun-hyang	**Lee Da-hae** - **Heaven's Fate**; Han Hye-jin - Be Strong, Geum-soon!; Im Soo-jung - I'm Sorry, I Love You
Best New Director (Television)	Best Screenplay (Television)
**Kim Jin-man** - **Ireland**; Ji Young-soo - Oh Feel Young; Shin Woo-chul - Lovers in Paris	**Kim Eun-sook, Kang Eun-jung** - **Lovers in Paris**; In Jung-ok - Ireland; Lee Kyung-hee - I'm Sorry, I Love You
Best Variety Performer - Male	Best Variety Performer - Female
**Cultwo** - **People Looking for a Laugh**; Park Soo-hong - Sunday Sunday Night; Yoo Jae-suk - Good Sunday	**Park Hee-jin** - **Hello Franceska**; Jung Sun-hee - Sunday 101%; Park Kyung-lim - Cute or Crazy
Most Popular - Actor (Television)	Most Popular - Actress (Television)
**Zo In-sung** - **Spring Day**; **Eric Mun** - **Super Rookie**	**Kim Tae-hee** - **Love Story in Harvard**

=== Other awards ===
- **Hallyu Special Award** - Choi Ji-woo
