= Le Privé =

Coordinates: 34.059012°N 118.309422°W

Le Privé was a successful Korean club or "K-Club" in Los Angeles which was believed to be the largest Asian dance club in North America.

== Significance and Design ==
The significance of this club had been reported in a variety of news media including LA Weekly, Asianweek, KoreAm Journal and the Seoul Times.

The club featured Gothic accents, gargoyles with lights piercing from their eyes, plush velvet couches, private karaoke rooms, a large dance floor that had an integrated floor illumination system, and marble trimmed bathrooms. The club was located on 721 S. Western Ave and opened in 2000, but closed in 2006. In 2007, it reopened under new ownership and a new name, Le Cercle.

A traditional bar set up where patrons would buy drinks at a localized station was not used. Instead, patrons were required to reserve a table/booth and order a bottle of liquor at a set price, which a waiter would bring to them along with a plate of fresh fruit. This was common practice at the venue, as well as other Korean-American clubs. A novel idea at the time, this practice made its way into the Hollywood clubs along with the Las Vegas night club scene.

== Booking ==
"Booking", a unique Korean club practice in which waiters introduce club patrons to each other, was common at Le Privé. Booking involves waiters bringing women (sometimes forcibly) to a table to sit with men. Both parties are free to leave at any time, or depending on mutual interest, they can continue to sit together. This is one of the few instances in Korean culture where tipping is encouraged, as waiters usually perform to a higher standard depending on gratuity. The system was based on quid pro quo, whereas females were offered drinks in return for their time chatting at the male tables. On rare occasions, roles were reversed where males would be brought to all female tables by the waiters.

== Clientele ==
Approximately 65% of the patrons were Koreans (Korean Americans and immigrants), 20% Chinese (Chinese Americans and immigrants), 5% other Asians, 10% non Asians. The club hosts an average age range from 21 to 30.

Jennifer Lopez, DMX, Sugar Ray and Gerald Levert have filmed music videos at Le Privé.
