= Booking (clubbing) =

South Korean night club practice

- Korean name
- Hangul: 부킹
- Revised Romanization: Buking
- McCune–Reischauer: Buk'ing

Booking (Korean: 부킹) is a common practice in South Korean night clubs of forced socialization. Booking is a practice in which waiters bring female patrons, sometimes forcibly, to a table to sit with men. Both parties are free to leave at any time, or depending on mutual interest, they can continue to sit together and drink and talk. Although outwardly similar, to outsiders, these are not hostess clubs, and although the men are expected to tip and pay their waiters to bring women to their table, the women are not employees nor are they prostitutes but fellow clubbers.

== Background ==
Confucianism in Korea has had a profound effect on social interactions, in traditional Confucianism one was expected to give proper deference and respect to one another based on one's position within a five level hierarchy, only the bottom of which was of one between equals, one's position in this hierarchy was based on a mix of one's ancestry, family position, official offices if any and social status. With regards to marriage one was expected to find a partner of the same social status as one's own, an appropriate partner being one whose status was neither above nor beneath one's own, to facilitate this there was the traditional matchmaker.

As South Korea urbanised and industrialised, the hierarchical stratification of society remained, in addition to ancestry one's social position in Korean society now includes the level of one's education, alma mater, profession, which company one works for and one's position and seniority (whether one is a seonbae or hubae) within the company. Increasingly less so, social interactions would become paralysed unless people were properly introduced and so could determine one's social position with regards one another, fear of behaving inappropriately to one's own position leading to an outright refusal to interact with strangers. With regards to marriage meeting people outside one's established social circle is difficult, and within this circle, for example with colleagues, one is constrained by what would be considered appropriate and inappropriate relationships depending on one's seniority and position in the hierarchy. The old professional matchmakers still exist, and friends and family will act as informal matchmakers, however even when both parties are interested in meeting a member of the opposite sex, such as when clubbing, a Korean would find it difficult to ask a stranger for a dance, a date, or more, and those who do would be seen negatively by the more conservative.

Booking arose therefore as an icebreaker between individuals who would otherwise be too embarrassed to approach one another and has been described as a form of speed dating. As South Koreans have become more comfortable with other ways to meet new people, such as through the internet, booking clubs have declined.

== Practice ==
In booking clubs groups of men will pay for a booth or room, the higher priced they are the better placed they are to observe the dance floor, they will also order a set of drinks and snacks for their table. The male groups are assigned a waiter who for tips will try to bring female patrons to their table, if they see a specific girl on the dance floor that they are interested in they may ask their waiter to try to bring her to their table. Although to outsiders, these clubs have been mistaken for hostess clubs, the women are not employees nor are they prostitutes but fellow clubbers, they are free to leave at any time, and male patrons should not make the mistake that their payment to the waiter, however much it may be, entitles them to anything but the opportunity to introduce themselves, or that it relieves them of the need to be gentlemen.

Among both male and female patrons there will be those who want more than some drinks, conversation and an exchange of phone numbers, it is the job of the waiter therefore to try and match only those with similar intentions.

== Criticism ==
Ahn Hyeong-hwan (안형환), the Grand National Party representative and the member of the parliamentary-level Committee on Culture, Sports, Tourism, Broadcasting & Communications raised the issue of how the English-language Arirang TV presented the concept of booking to viewers, and how it could potentially portray as negative an aspect of Korean contemporary culture.

== Outside of Korea ==
In the United States, Le Prive was a popular Korean-American venue for booking.
