= I Am Legend (TV series) =

2010 South Korean television series

- Promotional poster
- Genre: Romance; Music; Legal drama
- Written by: Im Hyeon-kyeong; Ma Jin-won
- Directed by: Kim Hyung-shik
- Starring: Kim Jung-eun; Lee Joon-hyuk; Kim Seung-soo
- Country of origin: South Korea
- Original language: Korean
- No. of episodes: 16

Production
- Production company: AStory

Original release
- Network: Seoul Broadcasting System
- Release: 2 August – 21 September 2010

I am Legend (Korean: 나는 전설이다; RR: Naneun jeonseorida) is a South Korean television series starring Kim Jung-eun that was broadcast on SBS on August 2 to September 21, 2010.

== Synopsis ==
Jeon Seol-hee (Kim Jung-eun) files for divorce after realizing that she deserves to be treated better by her unappreciative lawyer husband, Cha Ji-wook (Kim Seung-soo) and his snobbish family. Determined to get her life back on track, she returns to her rock band roots, becoming the leader of the Comeback Madonna Band (컴백 마돈나 밴드; Keombaek madonna baendeu). Her bandmates are fellow "ajummas" who have personal problems of their own, and together they search for happiness and personal fulfillment through music.

== Cast ==
=== Main characters ===
- Kim Jung-eun as Jeon Seol-hee
- Lee Joon-hyuk as Jang Tae-hyun
- Kim Seung-soo as Cha Ji-wook
- Jang Shin-young as Kang Soo-in
- Hong Ji-min as Lee Hwa-ja
- Hyun Jyu-ni as Yang Ah-reum
- Ko Eun-mi as Oh Ran-hee
- Jang Young-nam as Oh Seung-hye

=== Supporting characters ===
- Cha Hwa-yeon as Mrs. Hong
- Park Young-ji as District Attorney Cha
- Yoon Joo-hee as Jeon Jae-hee
- Kim Dong-hyun as Jang Noo-ri
- Kim Myung-gook as Yang Kwang-yeol
- Jung Suk-yong as Gong Deok-soo
- Kim Joon-hyung as Han Min-kyu
- Jang Hang-sun as Go Jin-bae
- Seo Jin-wook as judge
- U-KISS as Kiss Band
- Bye Bye Sea as Soo-in's boyband trainees
- Im Hyun-sik as President Beon Young-ho
- Baek Seung-hyeon as Young-nal (supermarket employee)
- Ha Seung-ri as Jo Eun-ji
- Teen Top as Themselves (cameo)
- Kim Hee-chul as Himself (cameo in episode 15)

== Soundtrack ==
The series featured real musical performances from the fictional Comeback Madonna Band – comprised by actresses Kim Jung-eun (vocals and rhythm guitar), Juni (lead guitar), Hong Ji-min (bass) and Jang Shin-young (drums). The original songs "Comeback Madonna" and "You" are included in the soundtrack, as well as several modernized rock covers of famous pop songs from the 1980s and 1990s that the band performed in the show. Comeback Madonna Band also performed live at the Pentaport Rock Festival and Jecheon International Music & Film Festival.

The official soundtrack was released on August 31, 2010 through LOEN Entertainment.

1. 컴백마돈나 (Comeback Madonna) – Comeback Madonna Band
2. 백만송이장미 (A Million Roses) – Comeback Madonna Band
3. 그대가 (You) – Lee Joon-hyuk
4. Killing Me Softly – Comeback Madonna Band
5. 회상 (Reminiscence) – Kim Jung-eun
6. 사랑사랑사랑 (Love Love Love) – Comeback Madonna Band
7. 기분 좋은 날 (A Fine Day) – Comeback Madonna Band
8. 그대가 (You) – Kim Jung-eun & Lee Joon-hyuk (Duet ver.)
9. 황홀한 고백 (A Blissful Confession) – Comeback Madonna Band
10. 뮤지컬 (Musical) – Hong Ji-min
11. 사랑은 빗물처럼 사랑은 늘 그렇게 (Love, Love is Always So, Like Rain Water) – Go Eun-mi
12. 너에게 Dear music (To You, Dear Music) – Kim Jung-eun
