= Lovers (South Korean TV series) =

South Korean television series

- Created by: Kim Eun-sook; Shin Woo-chul
- Based on: Turn Around and Leave by Lee Man-hee
- Written by: Kim Eun-sook
- Directed by: Shin Woo-chul
- Starring: Kim Jung-eun; Lee Seo-jin
- Music by: Park Se-jun
- Country of origin: South Korea
- No. of episodes: 20

Production
- Producer: Gu Bon-geun
- Production locations: South Korea; Hainan Island, China

Original release
- Network: SBS TV
- Release: November 8, 2006 – January 11, 2007

Lovers (Korean: 연인; RR: Yeonin) is a South Korean television series starring Kim Jung-eun and Lee Seo-jin who play a plastic surgeon and a gangster who enter into an unlikely romance. The series is based on the Lee Man-hee stage play Turn Around and Leave, the same work that inspired the 1998 blockbuster film A Promise starring Jeon Do-yeon and Park Shin-yang. It aired on SBS from November 8, 2006 to January 11, 2007 on Wednesdays and Thursdays at 21:55 for 20 episodes.

It is the third and final installment of the "Lovers" trilogy by writer Kim Eun-sook and director Shin Woo-chul. Unlike previous installments Lovers in Paris (which Kim also starred in) and Lovers in Prague which were partly shot in Europe, Lovers filmed on location in China's Hainan Island.

== Synopsis ==
Yoon Mi-ju (Kim Jung-eun) is the daughter of a reverend, who has adopted many children and set up an orphanage, and works as a plastic surgeon in a hospital, although her dream is to open a clinic of her own. Ha Kang-jae (Lee Seo-jin) is an orphan raised by Kang Choong-shik, a gangland boss, and his trusty right hand. The two meet when Mi-ju mistakes Kang-jae for her adoptive sister's former boyfriend, who dumped her after discovering she was pregnant; as Mi-ju learns a little later, Kang-jae is actually in a relationship with Park Yu-jin (Kim Gyu-ri), Mi-ju's neighbor. Kang-jae is also the potential buyer for the land that houses Reverend Yoon's orphanage, and that Mi-ju wants to sell, not knowing that the land and the house are at risk for seizure because of his father. When Kang-jae is wounded by some Chinese gangsters, Mi-ju treats him and he begins to fall for her; meanwhile, Kang Se-yeon (Jung Chan), son of the boss Kang-jae works for, falls in love with Mi-ju, who his mother wants as a daughter in law because she considers her a good catch.

== Cast ==
=== Main ===
- Lee Seo-jin as Ha Kang-jae

34 years old, orphan, gangster, right hand of gang boss Kang Choong-shik who raised him

- Kim Jung-eun as Yoon Mi-ju

31 years old, reverend's daughter, plastic surgeon, supports her father and his orphanage

- Jung Chan as Kang Se-yeon

33 years old, Kang Choong-shik's son, MBA educated, who returns to Korea after years spent abroad

- Kim Gyu-ri as Park Yu-jin

28 years old, owner of bakery, Kang-jae's girlfirend, Seo-yeon's first love

=== Others ===
- Kim Nam-gil as Tae-san, Kang-jae's subordinate
- Yeon Mi-joo as Choi Yoon, Se-yeon's assistant
- Lee Ki-young as Uhm Sang-taek, Kang-jae's right hand
- Park In-hwan as Reverend Yoon Mok-sa, Mi-ju's father
- Choi Ha-na as Hong Soon-jung, nurse in plastic surgery clinic, later living with Mi-ju
- Yoo Jung-hyun as Seol Won-chul, plastic surgery clinic president
- Choi Il-hwa as Kang Choong-shik, gang boss turned Chairman & CEO Baek Eun Construction
- Yang Geum-seok as Jung Yang-geum, Se-yeon's mother, Kang Choong-shik's wife
- Kim Roi-ha as Nam Chang-bae, gangster, nightclub president
- Jang Hang-sun as Baek Jong-dae, Baek Eun Construction Director
- Lee Se-chang as Lee Jin-soo, garage owner, tire dealer
- Moon Jeong-hee as Sang-taek's wife
- Yoo Dong-hyuk as young Se-yeon
- Kim Ki-bang as Dae-suk, a gangster working under Ha Kang-jae
- Kim Dong-gyun as Kim Dong-hoon, an employee of the construction company

== Ratings ==
In the table below, the blue numbers represent the lowest ratings and the red numbers represent the highest ratings.

Date	Episode	Nationwide	Seoul
2006-11-08	1	11.3%	12.1%
2006-11-09	2	12.2%	12.8%
2006-11-15	3	14.3%	14.8%
2006-11-16	4	15.6%	15.9%
2006-11-22	5	14.7%	15.5%
2006-11-23	6	15.6%	15.6%
2006-11-29	7	16.1%	16.4%
2006-11-30	8	16.0%	16.2%
2006-12-06	9	16.2%	16.7%
2006-12-07	10	15.8%	15.9%
2006-12-13	11	16.3%	16.3%
2006-12-14	12	19.5%	20.3%
2006-12-20	13	17.0%	17.4%
2006-12-21	14	18.0%	19.0%
2006-12-27	15	18.3%	19.4%
2006-12-28	16	16.6%	17.5%
2007-01-03	17	21.0%	22.2%
2007-01-04	18	23.2%	23.9%
2007-01-10	19	20.8%	21.8%
2007-01-11	20	25.3%	26.8%
Average		17.2%	17.8%

Source: TNS Media Korea

== See also ==
- List of Korean television shows
- Contemporary culture of South Korea
