= Lovers in Prague =

South Korean television series

- Promotional poster
- Hangul: 프라하의 연인
- Hanja: 프라하의 戀人
- RR: Peurahaui yeonin
- MR: P'ŭrahaŭi yŏnin
- Genre: Drama; Romance
- Written by: Kim Eun-sook
- Directed by: Shin Woo-chul; Kim Hyung-shik
- Starring: Jeon Do-yeon; Kim Joo-hyuk; Kim Min-jun; Yoon Se-ah
- Country of origin: South Korea
- Original language: Korean
- No. of episodes: 18

Production
- Executive producer: Goo Bon-geun
- Producer: Kim Yang
- Production locations: South Korea; Prague
- Production company: Olive9

Original release
- Network: SBS
- Release: 24 September – 20 November 2005

Related
- Lovers in Paris; Lovers

Lovers in Prague (Korean: 프라하의 연인) is a 2005 South Korean television drama series starring Jeon Do-yeon, Kim Joo-hyuk, Kim Min-jun and Yoon Se-ah. It aired on SBS from September 24 to November 20, 2005 on Saturdays and Sundays at 21:45 for 18 episodes.

It is the second of three TV series in the Lovers trilogy by writer Kim Eun-sook and director Shin Woo-chul. This was preceded by Lovers in Paris (2004), and the third, simply titled Lovers (2006), was not set in Europe like the first two.

== Plot ==
The president's daughter, Yoon Jae-hee (Jeon Do-yeon) is a Korean diplomat in Prague, Czech Republic. She has only recently recovered from a devastating break up five years earlier with Ji Young-woo (Kim Min-jun), the son of a prominent Korean businessman. Choi Sang-hyun (Kim Joo-hyuk) is a detective who goes to Prague searching for his ex-girlfriend Hye-joo (Yoon Se-ah). Hye-joo broke up with Sang-hyun over the phone from Prague and Sang-hyun cannot accept it.

Sang-hyun meets Jae-hee in Prague and misunderstandings abound. Eventually the two help each other and become friends. When they return to Korea love blossoms, but their respective exes and very different social status put it to the test.

== Cast ==
- Jeon Do-yeon as Yoon Jae-hee

The daughter of the President and an incumbent diplomat. She is upright and enthusiastic about her profession. After she passed the Civil Service Examination for Foreign Affairs, she was sent to Prague for her first assignment where she met Young-woo and fell in love with him.

- Kim Joo-hyuk as Choi Sang-hyun

A detective. He decided to become one as no policeman could help him solve a hit-and-run case, which killed his parents. Although hot-tempered and rush, he is kind-hearted. He meets Hye-joo when he was sent to solve a robbery case and fell in love with her; and helped fund her studies in Prague. After Hye-joo breaks up with him, he heads to Prague to look for her and there, he meets Jae-hee.

- Kim Min-jun as Ji Young-woo

A public prosecutor and the son of the chairman of a leading conglomerate, who grew up without family love. Not wanting to be under his father's shadow, he graduated from law school and passed the Judicial Examination. After he was exposed to the spotlight, he went backpacking in Prague to avoid everything. He met Jae-hee there and fell in love with her. However, he was separated from her after his father's interjection. When meets her again, she already fell in love with Sang-hyun.

- Yoon Se-ah as Kang Hye-joo

An orphan, who seems fragile but is strong. She becomes a kindergarten teacher after graduating from community college. One day, she meets Sang-hyun and fell in love with him. She heads to Prague to further her studies with the help of Sang-hyun, but unfortunately becomes pregnant. Her intent to climb to the top with wrong choices caused her to break up with Sang-hyun. After realizing her mistakes, she wants to reconcile with him.

- Lee Jung-gil as the Yoon Jung-han, Jae-hee's father, the President of Republic of Korea
- Jang Keun-suk as Yoon Gun-hee, Jae-hee's younger brother
- Jung Dong-hwan as Ji Kyung-hwan, Young-woo's father, the chairman of the Taesung Group
- Ha Jung-woo as Ahn Dong-nam, Jae-hee's bodyguard
- Yoon Young-joon as Suh Yoon-kyu, Jae-hee's friend and co-worker
- Kim Seung-wook as Hwang Dal-ho, Sang-hyun's partner
- Kim Na-woon as Shin Kwang-ja, Sang-hyun's aunt
- Andy Lee as Ji Seung-woo, Young-woo's younger half-brother
- Kwak Ji-min as Jung Yeon-soo, high school student
- Park Jae-min as Mrs. Young
- Won Duk-hyun as a student
- Shim Eun-kyung as a student
- Hahm Eun-jung as a student

== Reception ==
Ratings for the drama averaged 26–27% (31% at its peak), partly due to Jeon's return to television after a three-year hiatus. At the 2005 SBS Drama Awards, Jeon Do-yeon was awarded the Daesang ("grand prize"), and Kim Joo-hyuk won Top Excellence Award. Kim also won Best Actor for TV at the 42nd Baeksang Arts Awards.

== Ratings ==
In the table below, the blue numbers represent the lowest ratings and the red numbers represent the highest ratings.

Date	Episode	Nationwide	Seoul
2005-09-24	1	20.7%	22.6%
2005-09-25	2	20.2%	22.2%
2005-10-01	3	20.8%	22.1%
2005-10-02	4	22.2%	22.3%
2005-10-08	5	25.6%	27.7%
2005-10-09	6	27.8%	30.4%
2005-10-15	7	27.9%	29.3%
2005-10-16	8	28.5%	30.3%
2005-10-22	9	27.1%	28.3%
2005-10-23	10	29.2%	31.0%
2005-10-29	11	27.7%	28.7%
2005-10-30	12	30.2%	31.3%
2005-11-05	13	27.5%	28.3%
2005-11-06	14	26.8%	27.6%
2005-11-12	15	28.8%	31.7%
2005-11-13	16	27.7%	28.9%
2005-11-19	17	26.3%	27.9%
2005-11-20	18	31.0%	32.6%
Average		26.1%	27.9%

Source: TNS Media Korea

=== Awards and nominations ===
Year	Award	Category	Recipient	Result
2005	SBS Drama Awards	Grand Prize (Daesang)	Jeon Do-yeon	Won
2005	SBS Drama Awards	Top Excellence Award, Actor	Kim Joo-hyuk	Won
2005	SBS Drama Awards	Top Excellence Award, Actress	Jeon Do-yeon	Nominated
2005	SBS Drama Awards	Excellence Award, Actor in a Special Planning Drama	Kim Joo-hyuk	Nominated
2005	SBS Drama Awards	Top 10 Stars	Jeon Do-yeon	Won
2005	SBS Drama Awards	Top 10 Stars	Kim Joo-hyuk	Won
2005	SBS Drama Awards	New Star Award	Yoon Se-ah	Won
2006	42nd Baeksang Arts Awards	Best Actor (TV)	Kim Joo-hyuk	Won
