= Kim Jung-eun =

South Korean actress (born 1974)

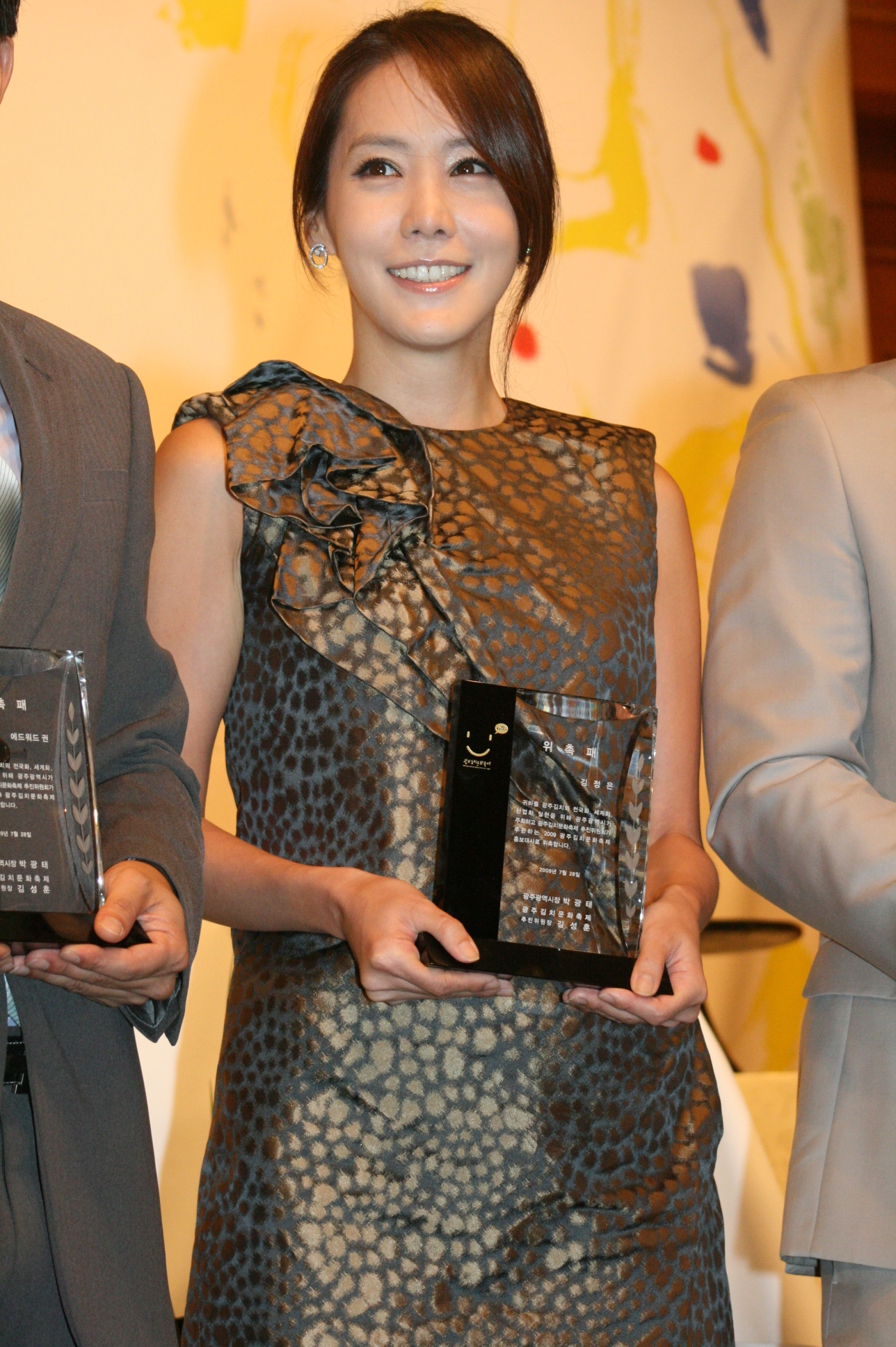
- Kim in 2009
- Born: March 4, 1974 (age 52); Seoul, South Korea
- Education: Konkuk University; (Theater and Film); Hanyang University; (Master's Degree and PhD)
- Occupation: Actress
- Years active: 1995–present
- Spouse: Unknown (m. 2016)

Korean name
- Hangul: 김정은
- Hanja: 金諪恩
- RR: Gim Jeongeun
- MR: Kim Chŏngŭn

Kim Jung-eun (Korean: 김정은; born March 4, 1974) is a South Korean actress. She is best known for her roles in the films and television series Marrying the Mafia (2002), Lovers in Paris (2004), Lovers (2006), Forever the Moment (2008), I Am Legend (2010), Make a Woman Cry (2015), and Strong Girl Nam-soon (2023).

In 2008, Kim hosted her own music TV show, Kim Jung-eun's Chocolate on SBS.

== Career ==
In 2002, Kim had her major breakthrough in film for her debut film, Marrying the Mafia, which earned a nomination for Best New Actress and won Popular Star Award at the 2002 Blue Dragon Film Awards. In 2004, Kim had her major breakthrough in television for the drama, Lovers in Paris which earned her awards and accolades including Grand Prize (Daesang) at the 2004 SBS Drama Awards. In 2008, she hosted her own music talk show, Kim Jung-eun's Chocolate and aired until 2011. It earned her award as a Best MC at the SBS Entertainment Awards in 2009. In 2021, she co-hosted a MBC network reality/variety show, DNA Mate (Family Register Mate) until 2023.

== Filmography ==
=== Films ===
Year	Title	Role	Notes
1995	My Old Sweetheart		
2002	Fun Movie	Sang-mi	
2002	Marrying the Mafia	Jang Jin-kyeong	
2003	Mr. Butterfly	Oh Hye-mi	
2003	Spring Breeze	Hwa-jeong	
2004	How to Keep My Love	Kim Hyun-joo	
2005	Blossom Again	Cho In-young	
2006	Mission Sex Control	Park Hyun-joo	
2008	Forever the Moment	Kim Hye-kyeong	
2010	Le Grand Chef 2: Kimchi Battle	Jang-eun	
2013	Mr. Go	Herself	Cameo

=== Television series ===
Year	Title	Role	Notes/Ref.
2004	Lovers in Paris	Kang Tae-young	
2005	Princess Lulu	Go Hee-soo	
2006–2007	Lovers	Yoon Mi-ju	
2008	On Air	Herself	Cameo Ep 16
2008	General Hospital 2	Jung Ha-yoon	
2010	I Am Legend	Jeon Seol-hee	
2012	Korean Peninsula	Im Jin-jae	
2012	Ohlala Couple	Na Yeo-ok	
2015	Make a Woman Cry	Jung Deok-in	
2017	Duel	Choi Jo-hye	
2020	My Dangerous Wife	Shim Jae-kyung	
2023	Strong Girl Nam-soon	Hwang Geum-ju	

=== Music video appearances ===
- Jo Sung-mo - "Immortal Love" (1998)
- Jo Sung-mo - "Mr. Flower" (2005)

=== Variety shows ===
- Family Register Mate (MBC, 2022) – Host
- Family Register Mate (MBC, 2021) – Host
- Legend Music Class - Lalaland (Channel A, 2021) – Cast
- Something (SBS, 2014) -MC
- Miracle Audition (SBS, 2011) – Judge
- Kim Jung-eun's Chocolate (SBS, 2008–2011) – MC
- TV Entertainment Tonight (SBS, 2001–2002) – MC

=== Web shows ===
- Alive (TVING, 2022) – Host

=== Documentary narration ===
- SBS Special: "Symphony of Dreams" (SBS, 2013)
- MBC Special: 도시의 개 (MBC, 2010)
- Wednesday Special: 금메달을 향해 뛰어라: 대륙의 올림픽 꿈나무들 (KBS1, 2008)

=== Radio ===
- To You Who Forget the Night (KBS Happy FM, 1999–2000) – DJ

== Discography ==
- Sad Fate – Kim Jung-eun (Ohlala Couple OST, 2012)
- In Heaven – JYJ, narration by Kim Jung-eun (2011)
- Reminiscence – Kim Jung-eun (I Am Legend OST, 2010)
- You (Duet ver.) – Kim Jung-eun & Lee Joon-hyuk (I Am Legend OST, 2010)
- To You, Dear Music – Kim Jung-eun (I Am Legend OST, 2010)
- Comeback Madonna Band

== Awards and nominations ==
Year presented, name of the award ceremony, award category, nominated work and the result of the nomination
Year	Award	Category	Nominated work	Result
1999	MBC Drama Awards	Best New Actress	Days of Delight	Won
2000	SBS Drama Awards	Excellence Award, Actress in a Sitcom	March	Won
2001	Ae-Gyun Cultural Arts Award	—N/a	—N/a	Won
2002	23rd Blue Dragon Film Awards	Best New Actress	Marrying the Mafia	Nominated
2002	23rd Blue Dragon Film Awards	Popular Star Award	Marrying the Mafia	Won
2003	39th Baeksang Arts Awards	Best Actress (Film)	Marrying the Mafia	Nominated
2004	25th Blue Dragon Film Awards	Popular Star Award	How to Keep My Love	Won
2004	Korea Advertisers Association	Good Model Award	—N/a	Won
2004	Korea Best Dresser Swan Awards	Best Dressed, Movie Actress category	—N/a	Won
2004	17th Grimae Awards	Best Actress	Lovers in Paris	Won
2004	SBS Drama Awards	Grand Prize (Daesang)	Lovers in Paris	Won
2004	SBS Drama Awards	Top 10 Stars	Lovers in Paris	Won
2005	41st Baeksang Arts Awards	Best Actress (TV)	Lovers in Paris	Won
2005	Asian Television Awards	Best Actress in a Leading Role	Lovers in Paris	Won
2005	Korea Broadcasting Awards	Best Actress	Lovers in Paris	Won
2005	26th Blue Dragon Film Awards	Best Leading Actress	Blossom Again	Nominated
2006	Ministry of Public Administration and Security Innovation Forum	Minister's Award for Contribution to Culture	—N/a	Won
2006	SBS Drama Awards	Producer's Award	Lovers	Won
2006	SBS Drama Awards	Top 10 Stars	Lovers	Won
2008	44th Baeksang Arts Awards	Best Actress (Film)	Forever the Moment	Nominated
2008	44th Baeksang Arts Awards	Most Popular Actress (Film)	Forever the Moment	Won
2008	16th Chunsa Film Art Awards	Best Actress	Forever the Moment	Nominated
2009	SBS Entertainment Awards	PD Award Best MC	Kim Jung-eun's Chocolate	Won
2010	Style Icon Awards	Style Icon, TV Actress category	—N/a	Won
2010	SBS Drama Awards	Top Excellence Award, Actress in a Special Planning Drama	I Am Legend	Won
2012	KBS Drama Awards	Top Excellence Award, Actress	Ohlala Couple	Nominated
2012	KBS Drama Awards	Excellence Award, Actress in a Miniseries	Ohlala Couple	Nominated
2015	4th APAN Star Awards	Top Excellence Award, Actress in a Serial Drama	Make a Woman Cry	Nominated
2015	MBC Drama Awards	Grand Prize (Daesang)	Make a Woman Cry	Nominated
2015	MBC Drama Awards	Top Excellence Award, Actress in a Serial Drama	Make a Woman Cry	Won
2023	JTBC Drama Awards	Best Female Lead Actress	Strong Girl Nam-soon	Nominated
2023	9th APAN Star Awards	Top Excellence Award, Actress in Medium Length Drama	Strong Girl Nam-soon	Nominated
2023	11th Korean Wave Awards	Best Leading Actress	Strong Girl Nam-soon	Won
