= Lovers in Paris =

South Korean romance drama television series

- Promotional poster
- Also known as: Des amoureux à Paris; Romance in Paris
- Hangul: 파리의 연인
- Hanja: 파리의 戀人
- RR: Pariui yeonin
- MR: P'ariŭi yŏnin
- Genre: Romance; Drama
- Written by: Kim Eun-sook; Kang Eun-jung
- Directed by: Shin Woo-chul
- Starring: Park Shin-yang; Kim Jung-eun; Lee Dong-gun
- Music by: Park Se-jun
- Country of origin: South Korea
- Original language: Korean
- No. of episodes: 20

Production
- Executive producer: Moon Jung Soo (SBS)
- Producer: Kim Yang
- Production locations: South Korea; Paris
- Production company: The Coup Media

Original release
- Network: SBS
- Release: 12 June – 15 August 2004

Related
- Lovers in Prague; Lovers

Lovers in Paris (Korean: 파리의 연인; RR: Pariui yeonin) is a 2004 South Korean television series starring Park Shin-yang, Kim Jung-eun and Lee Dong-gun. It aired on SBS from 12 June to 15 August 2004 on Saturdays and Sundays at 21:55 for 20 episodes. The series is the first in the Lovers trilogy by writer Kim Eun-sook and director Shin Woo-chul. This was followed by Lovers in Prague (2005), and the third, simply titled Lovers (2006), was not set in Europe like the first two.

The series was very popular during its run. Kim Jung-eun and Park Shin-yang shared Grand Prize ("Daesang") honors at the 2004 SBS Drama Awards, and later at the 2005 Baeksang Arts Awards, Kim won Best TV Actress, Kim Eun-sook and Kang Eun-jung won Best TV Screenplay, and the drama won the Grand Prize for Television.

== Plot ==
Kang Tae-young (Kim Jung-eun) is the daughter of a film director and carrying on her father's wishes, she studies film in Paris. To make ends meet, she works as a housekeeper for Han Ki-joo (Park Shin-yang), which she loves because she can watch his movies and drink his wine.

Unhappy with her services, he fires her. However, when he realizes that she is from the same hometown as the wife of a potential business partner, he hires her to act as his fiancée to warm up to his business partner. She agrees in exchange for getting her housekeeping job back. During the two dates that he takes her out, she is smitten by the fairy tale quality of the event. In turn he finds himself unexpectedly captivated by her. However, the fake girlfriend plan backfires, and they part ways on bad terms in Paris. Through a series of events she also meets Yoon Soo-hyuk (Lee Dong-gun), who is Ki-joo's nephew.

Recalled by his father, Ki-joo returns to Korea, and Tae-young also returns to attend her father's death anniversary. Both are reunited coincidentally in Seoul and have their misunderstandings resolved. She prepares to return to Paris, but discovers her uncle has squandered away her family house and run away, leaving her with her young cousin and the debts he has incurred.

While trying to sort out her family problems and retrieve her father's camera that was confiscated by the creditors, she meets Ki-joo again. Through multiple coincidental encounters, he finds himself attracted to her. Soo-hyuk also returns to Korea to track Tae-young down. He stays at her place and tries to win her heart. But he is devastated when he realizes that his uncle is also vying for her affections.

The situation is further complicated with the introduction of Moon Yoon-ah, the daughter of an influential politician whom Ki-joo's father has selected to become Ki-joo's wife. She also happens to be Tae-young's classmate in high school and is determined to win Ki-joo as her husband.

As Ki-joo and Tae-young open their hearts to each other, a scheming Yoon-ah and an emotionally wounded Soo-hyuk plot to split them up. Matters are further complicated when a long-held family secret is revealed: Soo-hyuk's mother Ki-hye is in fact Ki-joo's mother and not his older sister. Ki-hye had been in love with Ki-joo's father, but due to the difference in their wealth and status, the young couple was forced to separate by her father. She gave birth to Ki-joo out of wedlock, and to save face, the Han family raised Ki-joo as Ki-hye's younger brother. Then Ki-hye was married off to a rich man she didn't love, Soo-hyuk's father. Ki-joo reels from the revelation, and must deal with the lie at the center of his identity. Soo-hyuk also realizes that the closeness between his emotionally distant mother and Ki-joo was not that of siblings', but because Ki-joo was Ki-hye's more favored son. His bitterness grows that the two most important women in his life, his mother and Tae-young, have always chosen Ki-joo over him.

Meanwhile, Park Young-ji, an executive at GD Motors who wants to bring down Ki-joo, takes advantage of Soo-hyuk's feelings of envy and rivalry. He schemes with Soo-hyuk to leak the latest car design to the rival of GD Motors. The new car is announced and GD Motors is petrified because their latest design had been stolen. Later, Ki-joo figures out that Soo-hyuk was the culprit, but forgives him. The fact that Ki-joo forgave him so easily drives Soo-hyuk crazy. After getting into a car accident while blazing through the streets, he gets amnesia and loses his recent memories. (However, he was only pretending he had amnesia, as a final selfless act so that Tae-young and Ki-joo can be together guilt-free.) Yoon-ah also decides to let go of Ki-joo and throws her engagement ring into the Han River.

Ki-joo and Tae-young can finally be together. Unfortunately because of his family's disapproval of her, they decide to separate temporarily. She goes back to Paris and he stays in Korea. After two years, the new car is announced and is a success. Ki-joo immediately catches a flight to Paris. For some time, they do not know where the other is and keep missing each other.

Then one day, just like in the beginning of the story, Ki-joo throws a coin into a fountain and makes a wish to see Tae-young again. As he turns, he sees her standing there. The next scene shows them sitting by a river. Tae-young breaks the silence and asks, "If we had not met in Paris, do you think we would still have ended up together?" Ki-joo answers, "Most likely we would have."

== Cast ==
=== Main ===
- Park Shin-yang as Han Ki-joo
- Kim Jung-eun as Kang Tae-young
- Lee Dong-gun as Yoon Soo-hyuk

=== Supporting ===
- Oh Joo-eun as Moon Yoon-ah
- Kim Seo-hyung as Baek Seung-kyung
- Jung Ae-ri as Han Ki-hye
- Kim Sung-won as Han Sung-hoon
- Park Young-ji as Choi Won-jae
- Jo Eun-ji as Choi Yang-mi
- Yoon Young-joon as Kim Seung-joon
- Sung Dong-il as Kang Pil-bo
- Kim Young-chan as Kang Gun
- Lee Se-chang as Park Jung-hak
- Kim Sang-soon as Moon Ji-hwan
- Seo Kwon-sook as Mrs. Moon

=== Special appearance ===
- Kim Chung as Madame Vaudier (eps 1 & 3)
- Kim Kwang-kyu as man at bus stop (ep 13)
- Yoon Jin-seo as girl on the beach (ep 20)

== Production ==
Many of the scenes were filmed on location in Paris, France, and Seoul, South Korea. The Korean filming locations are as follows:

- Namsan Fountain and Namsan Park, Namsan, Seoul.
- The interior of the penthouse of the Oakwood Premier COEX Center, of the COEX complex in Samseong-dong, Gangnam District, was used as the Paris home of Han Ki-joo in the first three episodes.
- Several scenes were shot at the Grand Hyatt Seoul, in Yongsan District, on the historic mountain Namsan: the swimming pool which Tae-young falls into; the lobby where Ki-joo and Tae-young first kiss; The Paris Bar, where Ki-joo sings to Tae-young; J.J. Mahoney's, where the college hockey party was held; and the grand ballroom, where the engagement ceremony was held.
- Sangam CGV Multiplex Cinema at the World Cup Mall, Seoul World Cup Stadium was used as the location of Baek Seuk-kyung's CSV cinema, where Tae-young also worked and had the pajama party.
- Mokdong Ice Rink at Mokdong Stadium, Mok-dong, Yangcheon District was where Ki-joo and Soo-hyuk played ice hockey.
- Seoul Broadcasting System building was used as the headquarters of GD Motors.

== Reception ==
With an average viewership rating of 40+% and a peak of 56.3%, Lovers in Paris became one of the most highly rated Korean dramas of all time. It also received several high-profile awards, making it one of the most successful series aired on SBS. The drama's quotes, fashion and music made their way to mainstream pop culture (sparking trends and parodies), notably when Soo-hyuk put Tae-young's hand over his heart and said, "You are in here"; and Ki-joo's two lines "Let's go, baby"; and "Why can't you say it? Why can't you say that this is my man, that this is the man I love?"

== Ratings ==
In the table below, the blue numbers represent the lowest ratings and the red numbers represent the highest ratings.

Date	Episode	Nationwide	Seoul
2020-04-01	1	23.6%	23.9%
2020-04-02	2	25.9%	27.6%
2020-04-08	3	31.9%	33.1%
2020-04-09	4	32.5%	34.0%
2020-04-15	5	35.0%	37.1%
2020-04-16	6	37.1%	37.9%
2020-04-22	7	40.5%	42.8%
2020-04-23	8	43.6%	44.4%
2020-04-29	9	42.5%	44.1%
2020-04-30	10	46.1%	48.4%
2020-05-06	11	44.1%	44.9%
2020-05-07	12	49.5%	51.9%
2020-05-13	13	47.0%	48.4%
2020-05-14	14	50.0%	51.1%
2020-05-20	15	37.6%	38.7%
2020-05-21	16	39.2%	38.7%
2020-05-27	17	41.3%	41.7%
2020-05-28	18	51.5%	52.2%
2020-06-03	19	51.3%	53.1%
2020-06-04	20	56.3%	57.6%
Average		41.3%	42.5%

Source: TNS Media Korea

== Awards and nominations ==
Year	Award	Category	Recipient	Result
2004	2nd Andre Kim Best Star Awards	Best Star	Lee Dong-gun	Won
2004	6th Mnet KM Music Festival	Best OST	"By Your Side" by Jo Sung-mo	Won
2004	17th Grimae Awards	Best Actress	Kim Jung-eun	Won
2004	SBS Drama Awards	Grand Prize (Daesang)	Park Shin-yang and Kim Jung-eun	Won
2004	SBS Drama Awards	Top 10 Stars	Park Shin-yang	Won
2004	SBS Drama Awards	Top 10 Stars	Kim Jung-eun	Won
2004	SBS Drama Awards	Top 10 Stars	Lee Dong-gun	Won
2005	41st Baeksang Arts Awards	Grand Prize (Daesang) for Television	Lovers in Paris	Won
2005	41st Baeksang Arts Awards	Best Drama	Lovers in Paris	Nominated
2005	41st Baeksang Arts Awards	Best Director (TV)	Shin Woo-chul	Nominated
2005	41st Baeksang Arts Awards	Best Actor (TV)	Park Shin-yang	Nominated
2005	41st Baeksang Arts Awards	Best Actress (TV)	Kim Jung-eun	Won
2005	41st Baeksang Arts Awards	Best New Director (TV)	Shin Woo-chul	Nominated
2005	41st Baeksang Arts Awards	Best Screenplay (TV)	Kim Eun-sook and Kang Eun-jung	Won
2005	Asian Television Awards	Best Actress	Kim Jung-eun	Won

== Musical theatre adaptation ==
It was adapted into a stage musical that ran at the D-Cube Arts Center in 2012, starring Lee Ji-hoon and Jung Sang-yeon as Han Ki-joo, Bang Jin-wi and Oh So-yeon as Kang Tae-young, and Lee Hyun, Jung Woo-soo and Run as Yoon Soo-hyuk.

== Adaptation ==
In 2009, ABS-CBN produced and aired a Philippine remake based on Lovers in Paris. The adaptation was short-lived due to negative feedbacks.
